= 2011 Port Adelaide Football Club season =

Port Adelaide Football Club
2011 season
- President: Brett Duncanson
- Coach: Matthew Primus
- Captain: Domenic Cassisi
- Home ground: AAMI Stadium
- Pre-season competition: First round
- AFL season: 16th
- Leading goalkicker: Robbie Gray (32)
- Highest home attendance: 33,143; Round 4 v Adelaide
- Lowest home attendance: 14,169; Round 22 v Western Bulldogs
- Average home attendance: 21,678

The 2011 AFL season was the 15th season contested by the Port Adelaide Football Club, and was Matthew Primus's first full year as senior coach of the club.

Domenic Cassisi was confirmed to retain the captaincy for the 2011 season as part of a seven-man leadership group.

Port Adelaide recorded its worst ever season in the AFL, with only three wins in the year, against Adelaide in Round 4, Richmond in Round 10, and Melbourne in Round 24. They also became the first team to lose to expansion club Gold Coast after Port's Justin Westhoff missed a kick after the siren that would have won the game for Port Adelaide. Port narrowly avoided last place on the ladder and the wooden spoon with their final round win over Melbourne, which lifted them above Gold Coast on the ladder.

== 2011 squad ==
Port Adelaide Football Club
First team squad				Coaching staff
Senior List: (Western Australia) 1 Domenic Cassisi (c); (South Australia) 2 Cameron Hitchcock; (Victoria (state)) 3 Steven Salopek; (Northern Territory) 4 Daniel Motlop; (South Australia) 5 Matthew Broadbent; (South Australia) 6 Danyle Pearce; (Northern Territory) 7 Marlon Motlop; (South Australia) 8 Hamish Hartlett; (Western Australia) 9 Jacob Surjan; (Victoria (state)) 10 Travis Boak; (Victoria (state)) 11 Mitch Banner; (Victoria (state)) 12 Jackson Trengove; (Victoria (state)) 13 Cam O'Shea	(South Australia) 14 Paul Stewart (SE); (Fiji) 15 David Rodan; (Victoria (state)) 16 Ben Jacobs; (Victoria (state)) 17 Robert Gray; (South Australia) 18 Kane Cornes; (South Australia) 19 Nick Salter; (South Australia) 20 Dean Brogan (vc) (v); (Victoria (state)) 21 Matt Thomas; (Victoria (state)) 22 Simon Phillips; (Victoria (state)) 23 Matthew Lobbe; (Victoria (state)) 26 Andrew Moore; (Fiji) 27 Alipate Carlile; (South Australia) 28 Jay Schulz; (Victoria (state)) 29 Jasper Pittard	(South Australia) 30 Troy Chaplin; (South Australia) 31 Danny Meyer; (Victoria (state)) 32 John Butcher; (South Australia) 33 Brett Ebert; (South Australia) 34 Jarrad Redden; (South Australia) 35 Chad Cornes (v); (Western Australia) 36 Michael Pettigrew; (Western Australia) 38 Ben Newton; (South Australia) 39 Justin Westhoff; (Victoria (state)) 40 Aaron Young; (Victoria (state)) 41 Jason Davenport; (Victoria (state)) 43 Daniel Stewart; (Northern Territory) 44 Tom Logan	Rookie List: (South Australia) 24 Matthew Westhoff; (Victoria (state)) 37 Daniel Bass; (South Australia) 42 Thomas Jonas; (South Australia) 45 Callum Hay; (South Australia) 46 Daniel Webb; (Western Australia) 47 Jarrad Irons (SE); (South Australia) 48 Mitch Curnow; NSW Scholarship: (New South Wales) Harrison Cumming; (New South Wales) Simon O'Brien	Head coach: (Victoria (state)) Matthew Primus; Assistant coaches: (Victoria (state)) Jason Cripps; (Victoria (state)) Garry Hocking; (Western Australia) Dean Laidley; Legend: (c) Captain(s); (vc) Vice-captain(s); (v) Veteran; Long-term injury list; (SE) Season-ending injury list; Updated: 6/7/11; Source(s): Port Adelaide.com

== 2011 results ==
=== Pre-season ===
==== NAB Cup ====
===== Group stages =====
	Round 1
Friday, 11 February 8:20 pm	Melbourne 0.5.6 (36)	def.	Port Adelaide 1.2.6 (27)	AAMI Stadium (crowd: 18,202)	Report
Friday, 11 February 9:25 pm	Adelaide 0.6.4 (40)	def.	Port Adelaide 0.1.2 (8)	AAMI Stadium (crowd: 18,202)	Report
Port Adelaide lost both matches in Round 1 of the NAB Cup, and were knocked out of the competition.

==== NAB Challenge ====
===== First round =====
	Round 1
Friday 25 February 7:00 pm	Port Adelaide 13.11 (89)	def. by	Richmond 14.8 (92)	Traeger Park	Report

===== Second round =====
	Round 2
Friday 4 March 7:00 pm	Port Adelaide 19.21 (135)	def.	Geelong 7.9 (51)	AAMI Stadium (crowd: 4,110)	Report

===== Third round =====
	Round 3
Saturday 12 March 4:00 pm	Port Adelaide 21.13 (139)	def.	Greater Western Sydney 6.8. (44)	Willaston Oval, Willaston, South Australia (crowd: 4,164)	Report

=== Home and Away season ===
==== Round 1 ====
Round 1
Saturday, 26 March 2:10pm	Collingwood	def.	Port Adelaide	Etihad Stadium (crowd: 35,773)	Report
6.1 (37); 13.3 (81); 18.6 (114); 24.11 (155)	Q1; Q2; Q3; Final	3.1 (19); 5.6 (36); 11.6 (72); 12.8 (80)	Umpires: Vozzo, Jennings, Mollison; Television broadcast: Fox Sports
Dawes 4 Swan, Blair 3 Buckley, Cloke, Johnson, Beams 2 Macaffer, Jolly, Krakouer, Brown, O'Brien, Didak 1	Goals	Westhoff 4 Thomas 3 Irons 2 Schulz, Cassisi, Boak 1
Swan, Johnson, Dawes, Pendlebury, Thomas, Krakouer, Blair	Best	Thomas, Westhoff, Gray, K. Cornes, Salopek, Boak
Nil	Injuries	Schulz (knee)
Nil	Reports	Nil

==== Round 2 ====
Round 2
Saturday, 2 April 2:40pm	Port Adelaide	def. by	West Coast	AAMI Stadium (crowd: 23,214)	Report
2.3 (15); 7.3 (45); 12.4 (76); 15.8 (98)	Q1; Q2; Q3; Final	3.7 (25); 9.10 (64); 12.16 (88); 16.20 (116)	Umpires: Grun, Schmitt, Mollison; Television broadcast: Fox Sports
Gray 4 Davenport 3 C. Cornes 2 Irons, Cassisi, Pearce, Boak, Brogan, D. Stewart 1	Goals	Embley 4 Kennedy, Shuey 3 Nicoski 2 Darling, Ebert, Lynch, Rosa 1
Boak, Gray, Broadbent, P. Stewart, Rodan	Best	Embley, Cox, Shuey, Rosa, Kerr, Priddis, Kennedy
Salopek (hamstring), Cassisi (knee), Pittard (knee)	Injuries	Nil
Nil	Reports	Nil

==== Round 3 ====
Round 3
Sunday, 10 April 2:10pm	Geelong	def.	Port Adelaide	Skilled Stadium (crowd: 22,420)	Report
2.6 (18); 6.11 (47); 11.14 (80); 17.20 (122)	Q1; Q2; Q3; Final	1.5 (11); 2.5 (17); 5.7 (37); 6.7 (43)	Umpires: Stewart, Hay, Wenn; Television broadcast: Channel 7
Chapman, Menzel, Bartel, Duncan 2 Johnson, Hunt, Stokes, Ling, Podsiadly, Ottens, Hawkins, Corey, Christensen 1	Goals	Gray 2 Westhoff, D.Stewart, C. Cornes, Hartlett 1
Bartel, Selwood, Kelly, Ottens, Ling, Chapman, Duncan	Best	Boak, Gray, Pittard, Pearce, Broadbent
Nil	Injuries	Nil
Nil	Reports	Nil

==== Round 4 ====
Round 4
Saturday, 16 April 7:10pm	Port Adelaide	def.	Adelaide	AAMI Stadium (crowd: 33,143)	Report
0.3 (3); 6.6 (42); 11.7 (73); 14.14 (98)	Q1; Q2; Q3; Final	4.6 (30); 7.9 (51); 7.11 (53); 9.12 (66)	Umpires: Bowen, Wenn, Pannell; Television broadcast: Fox Sports
Rodan 4 Gray, Motlop, Westhoff 2 Surjan, C. Cornes, O'Shea, Salopek 1	Goals	Walker 2 Douglas, Tippett, S. Thompson, L. Thompson, McKernan, Jaensch, Vince 1
Westhoff, Rodan, Brogan, Boak, Chaplin, Pittard	Best	S. Thompson, Van Berlo, Rutten, Douglas
Nil	Injuries	Nil
Nil	Reports	Nil

==== Round 5 ====
Round 5
Saturday, 23 April 7:10pm	Port Adelaide	def. by	Gold Coast	AAMI Stadium (crowd: 21,287)	Report
5.3 (33); 9.5 (59); 14.7 (91); 15.11 (101)	Q1; Q2; Q3; Final	2.2 (14); 5.6 (36); 9.9 (63); 15.14 (104)	Umpires: Kennedy, Leppard, Hay; Television broadcast: Fox Sports and One HD
Motlop 4 Surjan, Hartlett 2 Westhoff, C. Cornes, Trengove, Boak, Ebert, D.Stewart, Davenport 1	Goals	Brandon Matera 4 Rischitelli, Dixon, Russell 2 Brennan, Smith, McKenzie, Ablett, Bennell 1
Westhoff, Motlop, Surjan, Hartlett	Best	Rischitelli, Brandon Matera, Dixon, Ablett, Swallow
Dean Brogan replaced by Daniel Stewart	Injuries	Matt Shaw replaced by Maverick Weller
Nil	Reports	Nil

==== Round 6 ====
Round 6
Saturday, 30 April 2:10pm	North Melbourne	def.	Port Adelaide	Etihad Stadium (crowd: 16, 014)	Report
4.5 (29); 7.12 (54); 13.20 (98); 18.25 (133)	Q1; Q2; Q3; Final	2.4 (16); 4.6 (30); 8.9 (57); 10.13 (73)	Umpires: Leppard, Schmitt, Findlay; Television broadcast: FoxSports
Harvey, Wright 3 Speight, Hansen 2 Firrito, Anthony, Thomas, Swallow, Harper, Goldstein, Petrie, Atley 1	Goals	Motlop 4 Ebert 2 Westhoff, Brogan, Gray, Broadbent 1
Harvey, Goldstein, Anthony, Grima, Rawlings, Adams, Firrito, Wright	Best	Hartlett, K.Cornes, Motlop, Brogan
Jack Ziebell (Calf), Lachlan Hansen (Back)	Injuries	Daniel Stewart replaced by Mitch Banner in the selected squad
Nil	Reports	Nil

==== Round 7 ====
Round 7
Friday, 6 May 8:10pm	Port Adelaide	def. by	Hawthorn	AAMI Stadium (crowd: 21,819)	Report
5.1 (31); 7.7 (49); 9.11 (65); 10.12 (72)	Q1; Q2; Q3; Final	3.5 (23); 7.7 (49); 10.11 (71); 15.14 (104)	Umpires: Nicholls, Ryan, Armstrong; Television broadcast: 7Mate & Main Event
Gray 2 Pearce, Ebert, Westhoff, Pittard, Hartlett, Schulz, Motlop, Hitchcock 1	Goals	Renouf 3, Franklin 3 Savage 2 Mitchell, Shiels, Whitecross, Sewell, Hodge, Bateman, Smith 1
Hartlett, Pearce, Brogan, Rodan, Chaplin	Best	Mitchell, Shiels, Renouf, Bateman, Sewell, Birchall
David Rodan (right knee)	Injuries	David Hale (back)
Nil	Reports	Nil

==== Round 8 ====
Round 8
Saturday, 14 May 2:40pm	Sydney	def.	Port Adelaide	SCG (crowd: 20,719)	Report
3.5 (23); 5.6 (36); 12.11 (83); 18.13 (121)	Q1; Q2; Q3; Final	3.2 (20); 4.3 (27); 8.5 (53); 9.5 (59)	Umpires: Schmitt, Meredith, Ryan; Television broadcast: FoxSports
Reid 3 Everitt, Goodes, Kennedy, Hannebery 2 Bird, McVeigh, Bolton, Smith, McGlynn, Roberts-Thomson, Jetta 1	Goals	Schulz, Motlop 2 Boak, Thomas, Logan, Chaplin, Phillips 1
Bolton, Kennedy, Goodes, Grundy, O’Keefe	Best	Boak, Chaplin, Thomas, Hartlett
Nil	Injuries	Nil
Nil	Reports	Nil

==== Round 9 ====
Round 9
Saturday, 21 May 2:10pm	Port Adelaide	def. by	Fremantle	AAMI Stadium (crowd: 16,274)	Report
2.2 (14); 5.3 (33); 11.4 (70); 14.6 (90)	Q1; Q2; Q3; Final	7.3 (45); 13.8 (86); 19.11 (125); 21.16 (142)	Umpires: McBurney, Leppard, Wenn; Television broadcast: FoxSports
Gray, Schulz 3 Phillips, K. Cornes, Hartlett, Westhoff, Pittard, Moore, Jacobs, Boak 1	Goals	Bradley 3 Mayne, Palmer, Pearce, Pavlich, Fyfe, Roberton; Lower, Ballantyne, Hill, Crowley, Broughton, Sandilands 1
Broadbent, Gray, Boak, Jacobs, Pittard	Best	Fyfe, Lower, Pavlich, Bradley, Crowley, Mundy, Broughton
Brett Ebert omitted for Cam O'Shea	Injuries	Aaron Sandilands(ankle)
Nil	Reports	Nil

==== Round 10 ====
Round 10
Saturday, 28 May 8:10pm	Richmond	def. by	Port Adelaide	TIO Stadium (crowd: 11,506)	Report
1.2 (8); 4.9 (33); 7.10 (52); 10.14 (74)	Q1; Q2; Q3; Final	1.4 (10); 3.6 (24); 9.9 (63); 13.11 (89)	Umpires: Farmer, Kamolins, Ryan; Television broadcast: One HD
Riewoldt 3 King 2 Nahas, Grigg, Jackson, Martin, Vickery 1	Goals	Gray 4 Schulz 3 Boak, Broadbent, Jacobs, O'Shea, Phillips, Westhoff 1
Houli, Foley, Jackson, Nahas, Grigg, Martin	Best	Brogan, Gray, Westhoff, Boak, Broadbent, K. Cornes, Pearce
Nil	Injuries	Nil
Nil	Reports	Nil

==== Round 11 ====
Round 11
Sunday, 5 June 7:40pm	Port Adelaide	def. by	Carlton	AAMI Stadium (crowd: 23,192)	Report
4.2 (26); 6.4 (40); 7.7 (49); 7.7 (49)	Q1; Q2; Q3; Final	3.3 (21); 5.7 (37); 9.11 (65); 16.15 (111)	Umpires: Kennedy, Stevic, Ryan; Television broadcast: FoxSports
Westhoff 3 Motlop, Broadbent, Schulz, Boak 1	Goals	Walker 6 Garlett 4 Betts 2 Ellard, Robinson, Murphy, Yarran 1
Westhoff, Thomas, Broadbent, Chaplin, Boak	Best	Walker, Robinson, Murphy, Thornton, Scotland, Simpson
Dean Brogan (finger, knee)	Injuries	Michael Jamison (ankle)
Nil	Reports	Nil

==== Round 12 ====
Round 12
Bye; Port Adelaide

==== Round 13 ====
Round 13
Sunday, 19 June 2:40pm	West Coast	def.	Port Adelaide	Patersons Stadium (crowd: 35,059)	Report
3.6 (24); 8.11 (59); 11.14 (80); 15.20 (110)	Q1; Q2; Q3; Final	1.3 (9); 3.8 (26); 8.9 (57); 13.10 (88)	Umpires: Farmer, Margetts, Dalgleish; Television broadcast: FoxSports
LeCras 4 Hurn, Kennedy 3 A.Selwood, Priddis, Naitanui, Ebert, S.Selwood 1	Goals	Boak 3 Gray, Pearce, Westhoff, D.Stewart, Phillips, Trengove, Hartlett, O'Shea, Logan, Schulz 1
Hurn, Priddis, LeCras, Rosa, Kerr, Glass	Best	Boak, Cassisi, Pearce, K.Cornes, Logan, Thomas
Nil	Injuries	Nil
Nil	Reports	Nil

==== Round 14 ====
Round 14
Sunday, 26 June 4:10pm	Port Adelaide	def. by	North Melbourne	AAMI Stadium (crowd: 17,275)	Report
5.3 (33); 9.4 (58); 10.5 (65); 14.7 (91)	Q1; Q2; Q3; Final	5.0 (30); 12.4 (76); 18.8 (116); 21.10 (136)	Umpires: Nicholls, Schmitt, Hay; Television broadcast: FoxSports
Schulz 3 Phillips, Rodan, M.Thomas 2 Moore, Gray, Westhoff, D. Stewart, Hartlett 1	Goals	Petrie 4 Harvey 3 Edwards, Pedersen, Greenwood 2 Ziebell, Adams, L.Thomas, Goldstein, Wells, Swallow, Cunnington, Anthony 1
Cassisi, Pearce, Schulz, Phillips, Lobbe	Best	Goldstein, Petrie, Ziebell, Wells, Adams, Pedersen, Greenwood
Dean Brogan (hamstring) replaced in selected side by Matthew Lobbe, Jasper Pittard (hamstring), Hamish Hartlett (dislocated shoulder), Alipate Carlile (groin)	Injuries	Sam Wright replaced in selected side by Kieran Harper, Adams (ankle)
Nil	Reports	Nil

==== Round 15 ====
Round 15
Sunday, 3 July 1:10pm	Brisbane Lions	def.	Port Adelaide	Gabba (crowd: 17,276)	Report
4.1 (25); 7.3 (45); 13.5 (83); 15.9 (99)	Q1; Q2; Q3; Final	4.2 (26); 8.5 (53); 13.6 (84); 13.10 (88)	Umpires: Chamberlain, Hay, Ryan; Television broadcast: FoxSports
Brown 4 Power 3 McGrath, Sheldon, Karnezis 2 Bewick, Stiller 1	Goals	Schulz 7 Ebert 2 Cassisi, Gray, Rodan, Phillips 1
Black, Brown, Power, McGrath, Adcock, Raines	Best	Schulz, Hartlett, Cassisi, Gray, Boak
Nil	Injuries	Nil
Nil	Reports	Nil

==== Round 16 ====
Round 16
Sunday, 10 July 2:40pm	Port Adelaide	def. by	St Kilda	AAMI Stadium (crowd: 16,887)	Report
1.2 (8); 4.2 (26); 4.4 (28); 8.5 (53)	Q1; Q2; Q3; Final	4.2 (26); 9.3 (57); 12.6 (78); 17.7 (109)	Umpires: McBurney, Stewart, Dalgleish; Television broadcast: Seven Network
Schulz, Hitchcock 2 Gray, D.Stewart, Pearce, Broadbent 1	Goals	Riewoldt, Gamble 4 Milne 3 Dal Santo 2 Montagna, Steven, Schneider, Goddard 1
Hartlett, Gray, Cassisi, Schulz, Logan	Best	Dal Santo, Goddard, Gamble, Steven, Riewoldt, McEvoy, Dempster
Jackson Trengove (Forearm)	Injuries	Nil
Nil	Reports	Nil

==== Round 17 ====
Round 17
Saturday, 16 July 8:10pm	Melbourne	def.	Port Adelaide	TIO Stadium (crowd: 7,255)	Report
6.2 (38); 9.6 (60); 16.8 (104); 17.11 (113)	Q1; Q2; Q3; Final	2.2 (14); 6.4 (40); 10.5 (65); 14.8 (92)	Umpires: Dalgleish, Armstrong, Jeffery
Jurrah, Maric, Petterd 3 Green, Martin 2 Gysberts, Jones, Nicholson, Sylvia 1	Goals	Banner, C.Cornes 3 Gray, Hitchcock 2 Cassisi, Hartlett, Pearce, Thomas 1
Petterd, Martin, Sylvia, Moloney, Frawley, Trengove, Maric, Jurrah	Best	C.Cornes, Thomas, Banner, Cassisi, O'Shea, Pearce, K.Cornes, Hartlett, Jacobs
Scully (knee)	Injuries	Thomas (eye)
Nil	Reports	Nil

==== Round 18 ====
Round 18
Bye; Port Adelaide

==== Round 19 ====
Round 19
Sunday, 31 July 4:10pm	Adelaide	def.	Port Adelaide	AAMI Stadium (crowd: 40,586)	Report
3.4 (22); 8.7 (55); 13.10 (88); 16.15 (111)	Q1; Q2; Q3; Final	1.5 (11); 4.9 (33); 9.10 (64); 11.13 (79)	Umpires: Margetts, Schmitt, Hay; Television broadcast: Channel 7
Walker 4 Wright, Gunston, Sloane 2 Otten, Henderson, Jacobs, Doughty, Maric, Mackay 1	Goals	Hitchcock 3 Schulz, Ebert, C. Cornes 2 Westhoff, Thomas 1
van Berlo, Vince, Thompson, Sloane, Johncock, Walker, Dangerfield	Best	Boak, Pearce, Hitchcock, Cassisi, Hartlett, Gray
Nil	Injuries	Jay Schulz (foot and back), Jack Trengove (knee swelling), Tom Logan (foot)
Nil	Reports	Nil

==== Round 20 ====
Round 20
Saturday, 6 August 7:10pm	Port Adelaide	def. by	Collingwood	AAMI Stadium (crowd: 21,863)	Report
0.1 (1); 1.1 (7); 2.2 (14); 3.3 (21)	Q1; Q2; Q3; Final	6.5 (41); 12.12 (84); 16.16 (112); 23.21 (159)	Umpires: Chamberlain, Hay, Ryan; Television broadcast: Ten/One
Banner 2 D. Stewart 1	Goals	Blair 4 Cloke, Beams, Swan 3 Brown, Krakouer 2 Rounds, Jolly, Sidebottom, Pendlebury, Fasolo, Ball 1
Boak, Cassisi, Banner, Lobbe	Best	Beams, Davis, Swan, Blair, Ball, Cloke, Thomas, Krakouer
David Rodan (omitted) replaced in selected side by Jason Davenport, Pittard (hamstring)	Injuries	Nil
Nil	Reports	Nil

==== Round 21 ====
Round 21
Saturday, 13 August 2:10pm	Hawthorn	def.	Port Adelaide	MCG (crowd: 27,532)	Report
8.1 (43); 17.4 (106); 23.6 (144); 31.11 (197)	Q1; Q2; Q3; Final	0.2 (2); 2.2 (14); 5.2 (32); 5.2 (32)	Umpires: Schmitt, Armstrong, Keating; Television broadcast: Ten
Franklin 8 Rioli 6 Mitchell, Smith, Breust, Lewis 2 Bailey, Birchall, Hale, Hodge, Sewell, Suckling, Shiels, Whitecross, Bateman 1	Goals	Banner, Butcher, Hitchcock, Schulz, Rodan 1
Mitchell, Lewis, Franklin, Rioli, Puopolo, Guerra, Gibson, Birchall	Best	Cassisi, Butcher, Lobbe, Jonas
Brad Sewell (back)	Injuries	Nil
Nil	Reports	Nil
This was Port Adelaide's largest ever loss, and the most points they had ever conceded in a single match, both eclipsing the records set the previous week.

==== Round 22 ====
Round 22
Sunday, 21 August 2:40pm	Port Adelaide	def. by	Western Bulldogs	AAMI Stadium (crowd: 14,169)	Report
1.0 (6); 4.1 (25); 9.3 (57); 15.7 (97)	Q1; Q2; Q3; Final	10.3 (63); 15.9 (99); 22.12 (144); 24.13 (157)	Umpires: Leppard, Grun, Kamolins; Television broadcast: Channel 7
Butcher 6 Banner 3 Stewart, Motlop, Gray, Rodan, Westhoff, Cassisi 1	Goals	Hall 6 Tutt 4 Boyd 3 Djerrkura, Grant, Giansiracusa, Ward 2 Griffen, Jones, Veszpremi 1
Butcher, Trengove, Banner, Lobbe	Best	Boyd, Tutt, Cross, Liberatore, Hall, Higgins, Djerrkura
Tom Logan (cut eye)	Injuries	Luke Dahlhaus (soreness)
Nil	Reports	Nil

==== Round 23 ====
Round 23
Saturday, 28 August 4:40pm	Essendon	def.	Port Adelaide	Etihad Stadium (crowd: 34,489)	Report
5.1 (31); 9.5 (59); 10.12 (72); 17.18 (120)	Q1; Q2; Q3; Final	4.5 (29); 10.7 (67); 13.10 (88); 17.11 (113)	Umpires: Hay, Jennings, McInerney; Television broadcast: Channel 7
Hurley 4 Davey, Jetta, Carlisle 2 Reimers, Ryder, Zaharakis, Colyer, Monfries, Heppell, Hille 1	Goals	Gray 6 Butcher 4 Schulz 3 Banner, Cassisi, O'Shea, Salopek 1
Hurley, Hille, Zaharakis, Heppell, Watson, Colyer	Best	Gray, Rodan, Boak, Butcher, Schulz, Motlop
Nil	Injuries	Cam O'Shea (ankle)
Nil	Reports	Nil

==== Round 24 ====
Round 24
Sunday, 4 September 2:40 pm	Port Adelaide	def.	Melbourne	Adelaide Oval (crowd: 29,340)	Report
3.2 (20); 8.4 (52); 13.6 (84); 17.10 (112)	Q1; Q2; Q3; Final	3.6 (24); 7.11 (53); 10.12 (72); 15.14 (104)	Umpires: Stewart, Ryan, Schmitt; Television broadcast: Channel 7
Westhoff 4, Ebert 3, Rodan 2, Boak 2, Banner, Gray, Motlop, Butcher, Salopek, Schulz	Goals	Jones 2, McKenzie 2, Green 2, Martin 2, Morton, Bate, Jamar, Trengove, Howe, Jetta, Fitzpatrick
Westhoff, Gray, Boak, Ebert, Motlop, Salopek, Rodan	Best	Moloney, Trengove, McKenzie, Jones, Howe, Bate
Jacob Surjan (Right calf/ankle), John Butcher (back), Alipate Carlile (quad)	Injuries	Sam Blease (head knock)
Nil	Reports	Nil

== Ladder ==
2011 AFL ladder
Pos	Team	Pld	W	L	D	PF	PA	PP	Pts	
1	Collingwood	22	20	2	0	2592	1546	167.7	80	Finals series
2	Geelong (P)	22	19	3	0	2548	1619	157.4	76	Finals series
3	Hawthorn	22	18	4	0	2355	1634	144.1	72	Finals series
4	West Coast	22	17	5	0	2235	1715	130.3	68	Finals series
5	Carlton	22	14	7	1	2225	1700	130.9	58	Finals series
6	St Kilda	22	12	9	1	1891	1677	112.8	50	Finals series
7	Sydney	22	12	9	1	1897	1735	109.3	50	Finals series
8	Essendon	22	11	10	1	2217	2217	100.0	46	Finals series
9	North Melbourne	22	10	12	0	2106	2082	101.2	40	
10	Western Bulldogs	22	9	13	0	2060	2155	95.6	36	
11	Fremantle	22	9	13	0	1791	2155	83.1	36	
12	Richmond	22	8	13	1	2069	2396	86.4	34	
13	Melbourne	22	8	13	1	1974	2315	85.3	34	
14	Adelaide	22	7	15	0	1742	2193	79.4	28	
15	Brisbane Lions	22	4	18	0	1814	2240	81.0	16	
16	Port Adelaide	22	3	19	0	1718	2663	64.5	12	
17	Gold Coast	22	3	19	0	1534	2726	56.3	12	

Source: AFL ladder
Rules for classification: 1) points; 2) percentage; 3) number of points for.
(P) Premiers

== Leading Goalkickers ==
Rank	Player	Goals	Behinds	Best Performance
Rank	Player	Goals	Behinds	G.B (Pts)	Round and Opponent
1	Robert Gray	32	14	6.1 (37)	Round 23 v Essendon
2	Jay Schulz	31	10	7.3 (45)	Round 15 v Brisbane Lions
3	Justin Westhoff	23	11	4.0 (24)	Round 1 v Collingwood, Round 24 v Melbourne
4	Daniel Motlop	16	13	4.1 (25)	Round 6 v North Melbourne
5	Travis Boak	12	6	3.1 (19)	Round 13 v West Coast
6	David Rodan	11	5	4.0 (24)	Round 4 v Adelaide
7	Brett Ebert	11	4	3.0 (18)	Round 24 v Melbourne
8	Mitch Banner	11	4	3.1 (19)	Round 22 v Western Bulldogs
9	John Butcher	11	1	6.0 (36)	Round 22 v Western Bulldogs
10	Chad Cornes	10	9	3.2 (20)	Round 17 v Melbourne

== Awards and milestones ==
Player	Milestone	Reached
Jasper Pittard	AFL Debut	Round 1
Cam O'Shea	AFL Debut	Round 1
Jarrad Irons	AFL Debut	Round 1
Matt Thomas	50th Game	Round 1
Dean Brogan	50th Goal	Round 2
Robbie Gray	50th Game	Round 4
Cam O'Shea	1st Goal	Round 4
Justin Westhoff	100th Goal	Round 4
Daniel Motlop	200th Goal	Round 6
Simon Phillips	Club Debut	Round 7
Jasper Pittard	1st Goal	Round 7
Simon Phillips	1st Club Goal	Round 8
Ben Jacobs	AFL Debut	Round 8
Ben Jacobs	1st Goal	Round 9
Jay Schulz	100th Goal	Round 9
Andrew Moore	1st Goal	Round 9
Michael Pettigrew	100th Game	Round 13
John Butcher	AFL Debut and 1st Goal	Round 21
