= 2016 Port Adelaide Football Club season =

Port Adelaide
- President: David Koch
- Coach: Ken Hinkley
- Captain: Travis Boak
- Home ground: Adelaide Oval

The 2016 Port Adelaide Football Club season was the club's 146th season since formation, the club's 139th season of senior competition and its 20th season in the Australian Football League (AFL). The club also fielded its reserves team in the SANFL.

== Player list ==
=== AFL player list ===
Port Adelaide Football Club
Senior List		Rookie List	Coaching Staff
1 Travis Boak (c); 3 Jake Neade; 4 Paddy Ryder; 5 Matthew Broadbent; 6 Angus Monfries; 7 Brad Ebert; 8 Hamish Hartlett (vc); 9 Robbie Gray; 11 John Butcher; 12 Jackson Trengove; 13 Cam O'Shea; 14 Paul Stewart; 15 Karl Amon; 16 Ollie Wines; 17 Tom Clurey; 18 Jimmy Toumpas; 19 Matthew White; 20 Chad Wingard; 21 Jared Polec; 22 Charlie Dixon	23 Matthew Lobbe; 24 Jarman Impey; 25 Logan Austin; 26 Riley Bonner; 27 Alipate Carlile; 28 Jay Schulz; 29 Jasper Pittard; 30 Sam Colquhoun; 31 Aidyn Johnson; 32 Dougal Howard; 33 Darcy Byrne-Jones; 36 Jack Hombsch; 37 Jesse Palmer; 38 Billy Frampton; 39 Justin Westhoff; 40 Aaron Young; 41 Brendon Ah Chee; 42 Tom Jonas; 46 Sam Gray	2 Kane Mitchell; 34 Will Snelling; 43 Dan Houston; 44 Cameron Hewett; 48 Nathan Krakouer	Head coach: Ken Hinkley; Assistant coaches: Shaun Hart (director of coaching); Michael Voss (midfield manager); Garry Hocking (midfield); Nathan Bassett (backline); Matthew Nicks (forward); Aaron Greaves (development manager); Trent Hentschel (player development); Jacob Surjan (player development); Stuart Cochrane (player development); Chad Cornes (SANFL coach); Legend: (c) Captain(s); (vc) Vice-captain(s); Long-term injury list; Upgraded rookie(s); (B) Category B rookie(s); (ret) Retired; Updated: 9 December 2015; Source(s): Playing list, Coaching staff

=== SANFL player list ===
Port Adelaide SANFL squad (Magpies)
SANFL list		Coaching Staff
1 Steven Summerton (c); 4 Ben Sawford; 5 Tom Gray; 6 Sidney Masters; 7 Louis Sharrad; 8 Zac Hawkins; 9 Luke Wilson; 10 Luke Reynolds	16 Sean Davidson; 18 Jack Haarsma; 19 Ciaran Hollingworth-Hughes; 21 Jonathon Ross; 23 Sam Gordon; 29 Anthony Biemans; 42 Zac Hawkins; 50 Robbie Young	Head coach: Chad Cornes; Assistant coaches: Stuart Cochrane; Trent Hentschel; Jacob Surjan; Legend: (c) Captain(s); (vc) Vice-captain(s); Updated: 1 December 2014; Source(s):

== Playing list changes ==
The following summarises all player changes between the conclusion of the 2015 season and the beginning of the 2016 season.

=== In ===
Player	Previous club	League	via
Jimmy Toumpas	Melbourne	Australian Football League	Trade period
Charlie Dixon	Gold Coast	Australian Football League	Trade period

=== Out ===
Player	New Club	League	via
Kane Cornes	Retired	Australian Football League
Tom Logan	Retired	Australian Football League
Daniel Flynn	Retired	Australian Football League
Mitch Harvey	Delisted	Australian Football League
Andrew Moore	Delisted	Australian Football League
Jarrad Redden	Delisted	Australian Football League
Mason Shaw	Delisted	Australian Football League
Sam Russell	Delisted	Australian Football League
Johann Wagner	Delisted	Australian Football League

== AFL season summary ==
Bold indicates home game

**Rd**	**Day**	**Date**	**Time**; **PM**	**Opponent**	**Scores** (Port Adelaide's scores indicated in **bold**)			**Venue**	**Attendance**	**Ladder** **position**
**Rd**	**Day**	**Date**	**Time**; **PM**	**Opponent**	Home	Away	Result	**Venue**	**Attendance**	**Ladder** **position**
**1**	**Sun**	**March 27**	**2:50**	**St Kilda**	**20.13 (133)**	15.10 (100)	Won by 33	**Adelaide Oval**	43,807	6th
2	Sat	2 April	1:15	Adelaide	22.12 (144)	**11.20 (86)**	Lost by 58	Adelaide Oval	51,585	12th
**3**	**Fri**	**April 8**	**7:20**	**Essendon**	**17.10 (112)**	7.9 (51)	Won by 61	**Adelaide Oval**	44,601	**8th**
4	Sun	17 April	1:10	Greater Western Sydney	22.19 (151)	**9.11 (65)**	Lost by 86	Manuka Oval	10,028	11th
**5**	**Sat**	**April 23**	**7:10**	**Geelong**	**8.11 (59)**	16.11 (107)	Lost by 48	**Adelaide Oval**	44,937	12th
6	Sat	30 April	7:25	Richmond	8.11 (59)	**13.16 (94)**	Won by 35	MCG	27,077	11th
**7**	**Sun**	**May 8**	**4:10**	**Brisbane Lions**	**21.10 (136)**	7.17 (59)	Won by 77	**Adelaide Oval**	32,399	10th
8	Sun	15 May	1:10	Carlton	14.9 (93)	**13.13 (91)**	Lost by 2	Etihad Stadium	26,924	10th
**9**	**Sat**	**May 21**	**4:05**	**West Coast**	**13.8 (86)**	14.10 (94)	Lost by 8	**Adelaide Oval**	38,695	10th
10	Sat	28 May	1:40	Melbourne	10.16 (76)	**18.13 (121)**	Won by 45	TIO Traeger Park	5,146	10th
11	Sun	8 June	1:10	Collingwood	7.16 (58)	**19.11 (125)**	Won by 67	MCG	28,567	9th
**12**	**Sat**	**June 11**	**1:10**	**Western Bulldogs**	**14.13 (97)**	15.10 (100)	Lost by 3	**Adelaide Oval**	40,096	9th
13	Sat	18 June	2:35	Fremantle	12.14 (86)	**9.15 (69)**	Lost by 17	Domain Stadium	32,448	9th
14	Bye									9th
**15**	**Fri**	**July 1**	**7:20**	**Richmond (2)**	**14.10 (94)**	8.8 (56)	Won by 38	**Adelaide Oval**	37,848	9th
**16**	**Thu**	**July 7**	**7:20**	**Hawthorn**	**12.7 (79)**	15.11 (101)	Lost by 22	**Adelaide Oval**	43,025	9th
17	Sat	16 July	4:35	North Melbourne	10.17 (77)	**16.9 (105)**	Won by 28	Etihad Stadium	24,361	9th
**18**	**Sun**	**July 24**	**4:10**	**Greater Western Sydney (2)**	**9.6 (60)**	11.13 (79)	Lost by 19	**Adelaide Oval**	27,935	10th
19	Sat	30 July	7:25	Brisbane Lions (2)	11.13 (79)	**25.23 (173)**	Won by 94	The Gabba	13,085	9th
20	Sat	6 August	1:45	Sydney	14.16 (100)	**4.9 (33)**	Lost by 67	SCG	30,204	10th
**21**	**Sat**	**August 13**	**7:10**	**Melbourne (2)**	**8.6 (54)**	13.16 (94)	Lost by 40	**Adelaide Oval**	33,426	11th
**22**	**Sat**	**August 20**	**7:10**	**Adelaide (2)**	**14.10 (94)**	15.19 (109)	Lost by 15	**Adelaide Oval**	49,541	11th
23	Sat	27 August	12:00	Gold Coast	9.12 (66)	**13.11 (89)**	Won by 23	Metricon Stadium	9,213	10th

== Ladder ==
Pos	Team	Pld	W	L	D	PF	PA	PP	Pts	Qualification
1	Sydney	22	17	5	0	2221	1469	151.2	68	2016 finals
2	Geelong	22	17	5	0	2235	1554	143.8	68	2016 finals
3	Hawthorn	22	17	5	0	2134	1800	118.6	68	2016 finals
4	Greater Western Sydney	22	16	6	0	2380	1663	143.1	64	2016 finals
5	Adelaide	22	16	6	0	2483	1795	138.3	64	2016 finals
6	West Coast	22	16	6	0	2181	1678	130.0	64	2016 finals
7	Western Bulldogs (P)	22	15	7	0	1857	1609	115.4	60	2016 finals
8	North Melbourne	22	12	10	0	1956	1859	105.2	48	2016 finals
9	St Kilda	22	12	10	0	1953	2041	95.7	48	
10	Port Adelaide	22	10	12	0	2055	1939	106.0	40	
11	Melbourne	22	10	12	0	1944	1991	97.6	40	
12	Collingwood	22	9	13	0	1910	1998	95.6	36	
13	Richmond	22	8	14	0	1713	2155	79.5	32	
14	Carlton	22	7	15	0	1568	1978	79.3	28	
15	Gold Coast	22	6	16	0	1778	2273	78.2	24	
16	Fremantle	22	4	18	0	1574	2119	74.3	16	
17	Brisbane Lions	22	3	19	0	1770	2872	61.6	12	
18	Essendon	22	3	19	0	1437	2356	61.0	12	

Source: AFL
Rules for classification: 1) points; 2) percentage; 3) number of points for.
(P) Premiers
