= 2017 Port Adelaide Football Club season =

The 2017 Port Adelaide Football Club season was the Port Adelaide Football Club's 21st season in the AFL. They also fielded a reserves team in the South Australian National Football League.

== AFL ==
=== List changes ===
==== Retirements and delistings ====
**Player**	**Date**	**Reason**	**Career games**	**Career goals**	**Ref.**
Jay Schulz	25 August 2016	Delisted	193	330	
John Butcher	30 August 2016	Delisted	31	41	
Sam Colquhoun	30 August 2016	Delisted	16	3	
Kane Mitchell	30 August 2016	Delisted	35	19	
Alipate Carlile	31 August 2016	Retired	167	5	
Paul Stewart	24 October 2016	Delisted	101	33	
Cam O'Shea	30 October 2016	Delisted	81	7	

==== Trades ====
**Date**	**Gained**	**From**	**Lost**	**Ref.**
18 October 2016	Pick 19	Brisbane Lions	2017 first round pick (Port Adelaide)	
18 October 2016	Pick 30	Gold Coast	Pick 67	
20 October 2016	Pick 14; Pick 17; Pick 31	Sydney	Pick 9 Pick 19; Pick 49	

==== National draft ====
**Round**	**Pick**	**Player**	**Recruited from**	**League**	**Ref.**
1	16	Todd Marshall	Murray Bushrangers	TAC Cup	
1	18	Sam Powell-Pepper	East Perth	WAFL	
2	32	Joe Atley	Bendigo Pioneers	TAC Cup	
2	33	Willem Drew	North Ballarat Rebels	TAC Cup	
Rookie elevation		Nathan Krakouer	Port Adelaide	AFL	

==== Rookie draft ====
**Round**	**Pick**	**Player**	**Recruited from**	**League**	**Ref.**
1	9	Peter Ladhams	Norwood	SANFL	
2	26	Brett Eddy	South Adelaide	SANFL	
3	42	Jarrod Lienert	Sturt	SANFL	
Category B		Emmanuel Irra	South Adelaide	SANFL	

=== Squad ===
Port Adelaide Football Club
Senior List		Rookie list	Coaching Staff
1 Travis Boak (c); 2 Sam Powell-Pepper; 3 Jake Neade; 4 Paddy Ryder; 5 Matthew Broadbent; 6 Angus Monfries; 7 Brad Ebert; 8 Hamish Hartlett; 9 Robbie Gray; 11 Aaron Young; 12 Jackson Trengove; 13 Todd Marshall; 14 Billy Frampton; 15 Karl Amon; 16 Ollie Wines (vc); 17 Tom Clurey; 18 Jimmy Toumpas; 19 Matthew White; 20 Chad Wingard	21 Jared Polec; 22 Charlie Dixon; 23 Matthew Lobbe; 24 Jarman Impey; 25 Logan Austin; 26 Riley Bonner; 28 Joe Atley; 29 Jasper Pittard; 30 Willem Drew; 31 Aidyn Johnson; 32 Dougal Howard; 33 Darcy Byrne-Jones; 36 Jack Hombsch; 37 Jesse Palmer; 39 Justin Westhoff; 41 Brendon Ah Chee; 42 Tom Jonas; 46 Sam Gray; 48 Nathan Krakouer	27 Brett Eddy; 34 Will Snelling; 38 Peter Ladhams; 40 Jarrod Lienert; 43 Dan Houston; 44 Cameron Hewett; 45 Emmanuel Irra (B)	**Head coach**: Ken Hinkley; **Assistant coaches**: Matthew Nicks (senior assistant); Michael Voss (midfield manager); Brendon Lade (forward/ruck); Nathan Bassett (defence); Aaron Greaves (head of development); Stuart Cochrane (midfield development); Trent Hentschel (forward development); Jacob Surjan (defence development); Chad Cornes (SANFL coach); Mark Clayton (academy coach); Legend: (c) Captain(s); (vc) Vice-captain(s); Upgraded rookie(s); (B) Category B rookie; Updated: 15 March 2017; Source(s): Playing list, Coaching staff

=== Season summary ===
==== Pre-season ====
**Rd**	**Date and local time**	**Opponent**	**Scores** (Port Adelaide's scores indicated in **bold**)			**Venue**	**Attendance**	**Ref.**
**Rd**	**Date and local time**	**Opponent**	Home	Away	Result	**Venue**	**Attendance**	**Ref.**
1	Thursday, 23 February (7:40 pm)	St Kilda	0.8.9 (57)	**0.7.14 (56)**	Lost by 1 point	Etihad Stadium (A)	5,363	
2	Sunday, 5 March (4:10 pm)	Richmond	**0.7.9 (51)**	0.11.13 (79)	Lost by 28 points	Malseed Park, Mount Gambier (H)	4,649	
3	Sunday, 12 March (12:40 pm)	Hawthorn	**0.14.12 (96)**	1.8.11 (68)	Won by 28 points	Hickinbotham Oval (H)	5,628	

==== Home and Away season ====
**Rd**	**Date and local time**	**Opponent**	**Scores** (Port Adelaide's scores indicated in **bold**)			**Venue**	**Attendance**	**Ref.**
**Rd**	**Date and local time**	**Opponent**	Home	Away	Result	**Venue**	**Attendance**	**Ref.**
1	Saturday, 25 March (4:35 pm)	Sydney	12.10 (82)	**17.8 (110)**	Won by 28 points	SCG (A)	33,129	
2	Sunday, 2 April (4:10 pm)	Fremantle	**22.13 (145)**	8.8 (56)	Won by 89 points	Adelaide Oval (H)	38,388	
3	Saturday, 8 April (7:10 pm)	Adelaide	**12.11 (83)**	15.10 (100)	Lost by 17 points	Adelaide Oval (H)	53,698	
4	Saturday, 15 April (4:35 pm)	Greater Western Sydney	16.16 (112)	**11.15 (81)**	Lost by 31 points	UNSW Canberra Oval (A)	9,185	
5	Friday, 21 April (7:20 pm)	Carlton	**20.17 (137)**	6.11 (47)	Won by 90 points	Adelaide Oval (H)	43,120	
6	Saturday, 29 April (4:35 pm)	Brisbane Lions	10.7 (67)	**22.18 (150)**	Won by 83 points	Gabba (A)	13,638	
7	Saturday, 6 May (4:05 pm)	West Coast	**12.15 (87)**	15.7 (97)	Lost by 10 points	Adelaide Oval (H)	38,333	
8	Sunday, 14 May (1:15 pm)	Gold Coast	4.14 (38)	**16.14 (110)**	Won by 72 points	Jiangwan Stadium, Shanghai (A)	10,118	
9								
10	Thursday, 25 May (7:20 pm)	Geelong	11.15 (81)	**11.13 (79)**	Lost by 2 points	Simonds Stadium (A)	24,909	
11	Thursday, 1 June (7:20 pm)	Hawthorn	**13.20 (98)**	7.5 (47)	Won by 41 points	Adelaide Oval (H)	37,910	
12	Saturday, 10 June (7:25 pm)	Essendon	19.17 (131)	**8.13 (61)**	Lost by 72 points	Etihad Stadium (A)	34,022	
13	Saturday, 17 June (4:05 pm)	Brisbane Lions	**18.13 (121)**	12.9 (81)	Won by 40 points	Adelaide Oval (H)	31,772	
14	Saturday, 24 June (1:45 pm)	Collingwood	9.8 (62)	**13.15 (93)**	Won by 31 points	MCG (A)	35,933	
15	Saturday, 1 July (7:10 pm)	Richmond	**8.15 (63)**	11.10 (76)	Lost by 13 points	Adelaide Oval (H)	39,979	
16	Sunday, 9 July (2:40 pm)	West Coast	13.10 (88)	**18.12 (120)**	Won by 32 points	Domain Stadium (A)	36,766	
17	Saturday, 15 July (1:40 pm)	North Melbourne	**19.13 (127)**	8.9 (57)	Won by 70 points	Adelaide Oval (H)	34,138	
18	Saturday, 22 July (2:10 pm)	Melbourne	13.10 (88)	**9.11 (65)**	Lost by 23 points	MCG (A)	27,068	
19	Saturday, 29 July (4:05 pm)	St Kilda	**9.9 (63)**	8.13 (61)	Won by 2 points	Adelaide Oval (H)	30,335	
20	Sunday, 6 August (4:10 pm)	Adelaide	18.22 (130)	**7.4 (46)**	Lost by 84 points	Adelaide Oval (A)	45,028	
21	Sunday, 13 August (4:10 pm)	Collingwood	**14.14 (98)**	10.11 (71)	Won by 27 points	Adelaide Oval (H)	37,533	
22	Saturday, 19 August (1:45 pm)	Western Bulldogs	11.13 (79)	**14.12 (96)**	Won by 17 points	Mars Stadium (A)	10,087	
23	Saturday, 26 August (7:10 pm)	Gold Coast	**20.15 (135)**	3.2 (20)	Won by 115 points	Adelaide Oval (H)	34,288	

==== Finals ====
**Rd**	**Date and local time**	**Opponent**	**Scores** (Port Adelaide's scores indicated in **bold**)			**Venue**	**Attendance**	**Ref.**
**Rd**	**Date and local time**	**Opponent**	Home	Away	Result	**Venue**	**Attendance**	**Ref.**
EF1	Saturday, 9 September (7:20 pm)	West Coast	**10.16 (76)**	12.6 (78)	Lost by 2 points	Adelaide Oval (H)	41,172	

=== Ladder ===
Pos	Team	Pld	W	L	D	PF	PA	PP	Pts	Qualification
1	Adelaide	22	15	6	1	2415	1776	136.0	62	2017 finals
2	Geelong	22	15	6	1	2134	1818	117.4	62	2017 finals
3	Richmond (P)	22	15	7	0	1992	1684	118.3	60	2017 finals
4	Greater Western Sydney	22	14	6	2	2081	1812	114.8	60	2017 finals
**5**	Port Adelaide	**22**	**14**	**8**	**0**	**2168**	**1671**	**129.7**	56	2017 finals
6	Sydney	22	14	8	0	2093	1651	126.8	56	2017 finals
7	Essendon	22	12	10	0	2135	2004	106.5	48	2017 finals
8	West Coast	22	12	10	0	1964	1858	105.7	48	2017 finals
9	Melbourne	22	12	10	0	2035	1934	105.2	48	
10	Western Bulldogs	22	11	11	0	1857	1913	97.1	44	
11	St Kilda	22	11	11	0	1925	1986	96.9	44	
12	Hawthorn	22	10	11	1	1864	2055	90.7	42	
13	Collingwood	22	9	12	1	1944	1963	99.0	38	
14	Fremantle	22	8	14	0	1607	2160	74.4	32	
15	North Melbourne	22	6	16	0	1983	2264	87.6	24	
16	Carlton	22	6	16	0	1594	2038	78.2	24	
17	Gold Coast	22	6	16	0	1756	2311	76.0	24	
18	Brisbane Lions	22	5	17	0	1877	2526	74.3	20	

Source: AFL
Rules for classification: 1) points; 2) percentage; 3) number of points for.
(P) Premiers

== SANFL ==
Pos	Team	Pld	W	L	D	PF	PA	PP	Pts
1	Woodville-West Torrens	18	14	4	0	1379	1132	54.92	28
2	Port Adelaide	18	13	5	0	1834	1226	59.93	26
3	Sturt (P)	18	12	5	1	1535	1263	54.86	25
4	Norwood	18	10	7	1	1539	1482	50.94	21
5	Central District	18	8	10	0	1477	1433	50.76	16
6	South Adelaide	18	8	10	0	1314	1404	48.34	16
7	Glenelg	18	8	10	0	1372	1535	47.20	16
8	Adelaide	18	7	11	0	1359	1527	47.09	14
9	West Adelaide	18	5	13	0	1210	1666	42.07	10
10	North Adelaide	18	4	14	0	1280	1631	43.97	8

Source: australianfootball.com
Rules for classification: 1) points; 2) percentage; 3) number of points for.
(P) Premiers
