= Simon Phillips (footballer) =

Australian rules footballer (born 1987)

Personal information
- Full name: Simon Phillips
- Nickname: Flipper
- Born: 5 April 1987 (age 39); Sandringham, Victoria
- Original team: Sandringham Dragons (TAC Cup)
- Height: 174 cm (5 ft 9 in)
- Weight: 71 kg (157 lb)
- Position: Forward

Club information
- Current club: Norwood
- Number: 12

Playing career^{1}
Years	Club	Games (Goals)
2006–2007	Sydney	5 (2)
2011–2012	Port Adelaide	8 (7)
Total		13 (9)
- ^{1} Playing statistics correct to the end of 2011.

Simon "Flipper" Phillips (born 5 April 1987) is an Australian Football League (AFL) player, originally drafted from the Sandringham Dragons part of the TAC Cup. He has played for the Sydney Swans and for the Port Adelaide Football Club in the AFL and now Norwood Football Club in the SANFL

== Sydney Swans ==
He was promoted to the senior side after the injury-related retirement of veteran Paul Williams mid-season, and immediately participated in his first senior AFL match in Round 15, 2006 at Subiaco Oval against the West Coast Eagles.

He was delisted by the Swans at the end of the 2007 season.

== Norwood (SANFL) ==
As of 2008 Phillips has joined Norwood in the SANFL making his debut in Round 1. To the end of 2009 he has played 35 Games and kicked 38 Goals.

In Round 17 of the 2010 season Phillips reached his 50-game milestone unfortunately losing to Central District by 8 points kicking 2 goals. Round 18 Phillips was voted one of the best players playing against South Adelaide Panthers.

Phillips played in Norwood Football Club's three in a row Premiership teams of 2012, 13, 14. As from the end of the 2016 season Phillips has played 133 games and kicked 199 Goals.

Most of the 2016 season was missed due to a serious shoulder injury.

== Port Adelaide ==
On 11 October 2010, Phillips was traded to the Port Adelaide Football Club as a pre-listed player for the Gold Coast Football Club. He debuted for Port Adelaide in Round 7, 2011 against Hawthorn at AAMI Stadium, replacing David Rodan who had injured his knee halfway through the game. Though Port lost, Phillips showed good form and played again the next games against Sydney and Fremantle. He played his first winning match with Port, against Richmond at TIO Stadium in Round 10, 2011, and he also kicked a goal in a crucial moment of the match.
