= Mitch Farmer =

Australian rules footballer (born 1989)

Personal information
- Full name: Mitchell Farmer
- Born: 4 January 1989 (age 37)
- Original team: Calder Cannons (TAC Cup)
- Draft: No. 49, 2007 National draft, Port Adelaide
- Height: 181 cm (5 ft 11 in)
- Weight: 82 kg (181 lb)
- Position: Defender

Playing career^{1}
Years	Club	Games (Goals)
2008-2009	Port Adelaide	3 (0)
2010–2011	Richmond	28 (8)
Total		31 (8)
- ^{1} Playing statistics correct to the end of 2011.

Mitchell Farmer (born 4 January 1989) is a former Australian rules footballer who played with both the Richmond Tigers and Port Adelaide Power in the Australian Football League (AFL).

The back pocket player is quick, durable and aggressive. He was in the top 10 in the vertical leap at the AFL Draft Camp, played for Vic Metro at Under-18 level and captained the Calder Cannons in their TAC Cup Grand Final win in 2007.

Farmer was selected by Port Adelaide in the 2007 AFL draft using their fourth and last pick, the 49th selection overall.

He was traded to Richmond along with draft pick 71 at the end of the 2009 season, in exchange for Jay Schulz.

Farmer played 28 games for Richmond before being delisted at the end of the 2011 season.
