= Jarrad Irons =

Australian rules footballer

Personal information
- Full name: Jarrad Irons
- Born: 20 September 1992 (age 34)
- Original team: Perth (WAFL)
- Draft: No. 50, 2011 Rookie Draft, Port Adelaide
- Height: 179 cm (5 ft 10 in)
- Weight: 75 kg (165 lb)
- Position: Midfielder

Playing career^{1}
Years	Club	Games (Goals)
2011	Port Adelaide	3 (3)
- ^{1} Playing statistics correct to the end of 2011.

Jarrad Irons (born 20 September 1992) is a former professional Australian rules footballer who played for the Port Adelaide Football Club in the Australian Football League (AFL). He was drafted with the 50th selection in the 2011 rookie draft. He made his AFL debut in round 1, 2011.

He is the son of Steve Irons who was the Liberal member of the Australian House of Representatives for the electoral division of Swan in Western Australia.
