= Kieran Harper =

Australian rules footballer

Personal information
- Full name: Kieran Harper
- Born: 15 June 1992 (age 34)
- Original team: Eastern Ranges (TAC Cup)
- Draft: No. 27 (C), 2010 National Draft, North Melbourne
- Height: 187 cm (6 ft 2 in)
- Weight: 84 kg (185 lb)
- Position: Midfielder

Playing career^{1}
Years	Club	Games (Goals)
2011–2015	North Melbourne	40 (37)
- ^{1} Playing statistics correct to the end of 2015.

Kieran Harper is a former professional Australian rules footballer. Harper played for the North Melbourne Football Club in the Australian Football League, also known and referred to as the AFL.

Kieran was taken with pick 27 in the 2010 national draft and made his debut in Round 6, 2011 against Port Adelaide. He remained with the club until he was delisted in October 2015.

In February 2016, Harper joined the University Blues Football Club. However due to an ongoing ankle injury which plagued his AFL career, he missed a majority of the season.
