= Matthew Westhoff =

Australian rules footballer (born 1988)

Personal information
- Full name: Matthew Westhoff
- Born: 5 June 1988 (age 38); Adelaide
- Original team: Central District (SANFL)
- Draft: No. 33, 2007 National Draft, Port Adelaide
- Height: 198 cm (6 ft 6 in)
- Weight: 91 kg (201 lb)
- Position: Defender

Playing career^{1}
| Years | Club | Games (Goals) |
| 2008–2011 | Port Adelaide | 6 (5) |
- ^{1} Playing statistics correct to the end of 2011.

Matthew Westhoff (born 5 June 1988) is an Australian rules footballer who briefly played for Port Adelaide in the Australian Football League. He is the brother of veteran Port Adelaide player, Justin Westhoff.

Westhoff made his AFL debut in Round 20, 2008 at AAMI Stadium against Collingwood. Port Adelaide lost the game by 31 points, with Westhoff kicking one goal on his debut. The following week, Port Adelaide convincingly beat Melbourne at home, with Westhoff booting two goals in the rout. He then played in the final game of the season, but went goalless.

Westhoff didn't return to Port's senior side until Round 10 of 2009. He then played three games in a row, before being dropped for the remainder of the season. In those three games, Westhoff kicked one goal against Collingwood, and a single goal the following week against Fremantle.

Midway through the 2010 season, Westhoff moved from forward to defence in the SANFL, but did not play any senior games. He was delisted by the Power at the end of the 2010 season, but then re-drafted in 2011 as a rookie.

On 27 August 2011, Westhoff broke his left arm while playing for the Central Districts in the SANFL, and Port again delisted him at the end of 2011.
