= Steven Salopek =

Australian rules footballer, born 1985

Personal information
- Full name: Steven Salopek
- Born: 21 June 1985 (age 41)
- Original team: Dandenong Stingrays (TAC Cup)
- Draft: No. 6, 2002 National Draft, Port Adelaide
- Height: 185 cm (6 ft 1 in)
- Weight: 83 kg (183 lb)
- Position: Midfielder

Playing career
Years	Club	Games (Goals)
2003–2012	Port Adelaide	121 (53)

Steven Salopek (born 21 June 1985) is an Australian rules footballer of Croatian descent who played for Port Adelaide Football Club in the Australian Football League (AFL). Originally from Narre Warren Football Club in Melbourne's south-east, Salopek played for the Dandenong Stingrays in the TAC Cup before being a first round drafted choice at the 2002 AFL draft, being selected at number six by Port Adelaide. Salopek is currently an Assistant Coach (Backline) for the Carlton Football Club in the AFL Women's.

== Port Adelaide career ==
Salopek wore number 31 for Port Adelaide until 2005 when he changed to number three and enjoyed probably his best season for Port Adelaide in 2006. Salopek was part of Port Adelaide's 2007 Grand Final side and had continued success from 2008 to 2010. However, recurring injuries would limit his playing time.

== Glenelg Football Club 2012 ==
When not in the Port Adelaide side, Salopek played with South Australian National Football League (SANFL) team Glenelg. However, following his demotion to Glenelg's reserve side in 2012, Salopek sought and was granted a transfer to Port Adelaide's SANFL team.

== Coaching ==
=== Carlton Football Club 2018 - Present ===
On the 9th of November, Salopek was announced as an Assistant Coach (Backline) for the Carlton Football Club in the AFL Women's.
