= Brett Ebert =

Australian rules footballer, born 1983

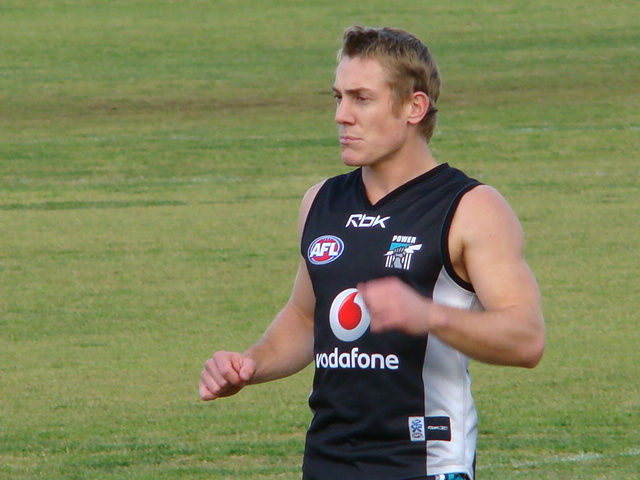

Personal information
- Full name: Brett Ebert
- Born: 18 November 1983 (age 42)
- Original team: Port Adelaide (SANFL)
- Draft: No. 42 (F/S), 2002 National Draft, Port Adelaide
- Height: 179 cm (5 ft 10 in)
- Weight: 84 kg (185 lb)
- Position: Forward

Playing career^{1}
Years	Club	Games (Goals)
2003–2013	Port Adelaide	166 (240)
- ^{1} Playing statistics correct to the end of Round 7, 2013.

Career highlights
- Magarey Medal 2003; 2004 AFL Rising Star nominee; Port Adelaide leading goalkicker 2007

Brett Ebert (born 18 November 1983) is a former Australian rules footballer. He is the son of Port Adelaide legend Russell Ebert and cousin of Port Adelaide's Brad Ebert.

== AFL career ==
=== Early career (2004–2005) ===
Brett Ebert began his career with the Port Adelaide Magpies in the South Australian National Football League (SANFL) and was drafted by the Port Adelaide under the father/son rule at the 2002 AFL draft. Winning a Magarey Medal in 2003, Ebert made his AFL debut in 2004 and ended the season with the premiership winning side with 17 goals including 4 goals in the Round 10 win against Geelong, and an AFL Rising Star nomination. In 2005, he kicked 18 goals, only a goal more than the previous year.

=== Rising career (2006–2007) ===
Ebert finished second in the club's goalkicking with 24 goals in 2006. A booming kick and a strong mark for his size, he kicked four goals once against Collingwood in Round 2 and three goals twice against Carlton in Round 10 and Adelaide in Round 21. Ebert led Port's goalkicking in 2007 with 56 goals, including a career best 6 goals twice; once against Richmond in Round 16 and against Melbourne in Round 17. He failed to kick any goals in Port Adelaide's 119 point Grand Final loss to Geelong. He was nominated for the 2007 All-Australian side.

=== Progressing career (2008–2012) ===
In 2008, Ebert kicked 33 goals with a six-goal haul against the Sydney Swans in Round 9. In 2009, he kicked 28 goals in 20 games, with a highlight of 4 goals in the Round 14 win against the Brisbane Lions. In 2010, prior to Round 21, Ebert was Port Adelaide's leading goal kicker with 30 goals for the season. In Round 21, Ebert injured his knee which turned out be an ACL injury.

=== Retirement (2013) ===
On 21 August, Brett Ebert announced his retirement after being unable to play a game in the 2013 season because of injuries.
