= Matt Thomas (Australian rules footballer) =

Australian rules footballer (born 1987)

Personal information
- Full name: Matthew Thomas
- Born: 27 February 1987 (age 39)
- Original team: Sandringham Dragons (TAC Cup)
- Draft: No. 8, 2006 Pre-Season draft, Port Adelaide; No. 42, 2013 Rookie draft, Richmond
- Height: 186 cm (6 ft 1 in)
- Weight: 87 kg (192 lb)
- Position: Midfielder

Playing career^{1}
Years	Club	Games (Goals)
2006–2013	Port Adelaide	87 (30)
2014–2015	Richmond	15 (6)
Total		102 (36)
- ^{1} Playing statistics correct to the end of 2015.

Career highlights
- 2013 Magarey Medal (SANFL)

Matthew Thomas (born 27 February 1987) is a former professional Australian rules footballer who played for the Port Adelaide Football Club and the Richmond Football Club in the Australian Football League (AFL). In 2013, Thomas won the Magarey Medal while playing for Norwood. He was delisted by Port Adelaide at the end of the 2013 season. Thomas was picked up by Richmond in the 2013 Rookie Draft and then elevated to its senior list on 11 March 2014.

== Port Adelaide career ==
Recruited at pick number eight in the 2006 Pre-season draft from TAC Cup side Sandringham Dragons, Thomas played as either a defender or a midfielder. Because he was drafted from outside South Australia, Thomas was placed in the South Australian National Football League (SANFL) internal draft, and picked up by Norwood. Thomas made his debut in the third round of the SANFL, against Woodville-West Torrens. He played 10 games and scored one goal for Norwood during the 2006 season.

In 2006, Thomas made his AFL debut in round 14 against Richmond, after some impressive mid-season form with Norwood in the SANFL. His first kick in AFL football resulted in a goal, although Port Adelaide lost the match by 38 points. Thomas was kept in the side that played Geelong the next week, and scored another goal. He then played another six games for the year, playing eight in total and kicking three goals.

In 2007, Thomas spent time in hospital, after complications from having his appendix removed. He lost 15 kg in just two weeks, after an abdominal infection following his appendix removal. It was so severe that he had a section of his intestine removed.

In 2013, Thomas won the Magarey Medal while playing for Norwood. He was delisted by Port Adelaide at season's end.

== Richmond career ==
Thomas was recruited by Richmond at pick 42 in the 2014 Rookie Draft held in November 2013. His first appearance in a Richmond jumper was on 22 February 2014, in the NAB Challenge series and he had 15 disposals, two marks and two tackles. On 11 March 2014, Thomas was elevated to the club's senior list. He announced his retirement in October 2015.

== Playing statistics ==
Legend
G	Goals	K	Kicks	D	Disposals	T	Tackles
B	Behinds	H	Handballs	M	Marks

Season	Team	No.	Games	Totals							Averages (per game)						
Season	Team	No.	Games	G	B	K	H	D	M	T	G	B	K	H	D	M	T
2006	Port Adelaide	32	8	3	3	39	43	82	21	25	0.4	0.4	4.9	5.4	10.3	2.6	3.1
2007	Port Adelaide	32	4	1	1	18	25	43	13	6	0.3	0.3	4.5	6.3	10.8	3.3	1.5
2008	Port Adelaide	32	5	0	0	21	41	62	12	22	0.0	0.0	4.2	8.2	12.4	2.4	4.4
2009	Port Adelaide	21	12	3	5	60	136	196	53	42	0.3	0.4	5.0	11.3	16.3	4.4	3.5
2010	Port Adelaide	21	20	6	6	131	219	350	62	113	0.3	0.3	6.6	11.0	17.5	3.1	5.7
2011	Port Adelaide	21	19	8	2	105	210	315	66	123	0.4	0.1	5.5	11.1	16.6	3.5	6.5
2012	Port Adelaide	21	15	6	9	89	129	218	55	63	0.4	0.6	5.9	8.6	14.5	3.7	4.2
2013	Port Adelaide	21	4	3	1	18	45	63	12	14	0.8	0.3	4.5	11.3	15.8	3.0	3.5
2014	Richmond	19	13	4	0	81	185	266	50	77	0.3	0.0	6.2	14.2	20.5	3.8	5.9
2015	Richmond	19	2	2	0	11	28	39	8	6	1.0	0.0	5.5	14.0	19.5	4.0	3.0
Career			102	36	27	573	1061	1634	352	491	0.4	0.3	5.6	10.4	16.0	3.5	4.8
