= Daniel Stewart (Australian footballer) =

Australian rules footballer (1988–2026)

- Stewart with Port Adelaide in 2012

Personal information
- Full name: Daniel Byron Stewart
- Born: 30 October 1988
- Died: 23 October 2026 (aged 37)
- Original teams: Norwood (EFL); Eastern Ranges (TAC Cup)
- Height: 200 cm (6 ft 7 in)
- Weight: 92 kg (203 lb)
- Position: Key forward

Playing career^{1}
Years	Club	Games (Goals)
2010–2013	Port Adelaide	36 (31)
- ^{1} Playing statistics correct to the end of 2013.

Daniel Byron Stewart (30 October 1988 – 23 October 2026) was an Australian rules footballer who played for the Port Adelaide Football Club in the Australian Football League (AFL).

== Life and career ==
Stewart played junior football for the Norwood Football Club in the Eastern Football League (EFL) and the Eastern Ranges in the TAC Cup, before relocating to Queensland to play for the Labrador Football Club in the AFL Queensland (AFLQ) league, and subsequently to North Adelaide in the South Australian Football League (SANFL) ahead of the 2008 season.

He was drafted by Port Adelaide in the 2009 rookie draft with the 35th selection and spent the 2009 SANFL season playing for North Adelaide before his promotion to Port's senior list at the end of the 2009 AFL season.

After performing well in the 2010 NAB Cup, Stewart made his senior debut in Round 4 of the 2010 season. He played 11 games in 2010 and kicking 12 goals in total, including a career-best four goals against Richmond in Round 22.

Stewart was delisted by Port Adelaide at the conclusion of the 2013 season following one appearance for the year.

Stewart died on 23 October 2026 at the age of 37 after suffering a medical episode.
