= Mitch Banner =

Australian rules footballer (born 1990)

Personal information
- Full name: Mitchell Banner
- Born: 5 June 1990 (age 36)
- Original team: Western Jets
- Draft: 42nd overall, 2008 National Draft
- Height: 179 cm (5 ft 10 in)
- Weight: 80 kg (176 lb)
- Position: Midfielder

Playing career^{1}
Years	Club	Games (Goals)
2009–2012	Port Adelaide	19 (16)
- ^{1} Playing statistics correct to the end of 2011.

Career highlights
- VFL premiership player: 2015

Mitchell Banner (born 5 June 1990) is a former professional Australian rules footballer who played for the Port Adelaide Football Club in the Australian Football League (AFL).

Banner was recruited to Port Adelaide from TAC Cup team the Western Jets with the 42nd selection in the 2008 AFL draft. He also represented Victoria Metro at the 2008 AFL Under 18 Championships. He spent the 2009 season playing for Woodville-West Torrens in the South Australian National Football League (SANFL), but made an impressive pre-season debut for Port Adelaide in February 2010, scoring two goals and being named as one of his team's best players.

Banner was delisted from Port Adelaide in 2012.

In 2013 he played for South Fremantle in the West Australian Football League (WAFL), where he kicked the most goals for the club for the season. He moved back to Victoria in 2014, joining Williamstown Football Club in the Victorian Football League (VFL). Banner played in Williamstown's 2015 premiership win over Box Hill and came third in the Club best and fairest award. He played a total of 41 games and kicked 36 goals for the VFL Seagulls in 2014 and 2015 before transferring to Darley for the 2016 season.
