= Cameron Hitchcock =

Australian rules footballer

Personal information
- Full name: Cameron Hitchcock
- Born: 3 July 1990 (age 36)
- Original team: Glenelg (SANFL)
- Draft: No. 12, 2010 Rookie Draft, Port Adelaide
- Height: 176 cm (5 ft 9 in)
- Weight: 73 kg (161 lb)
- Position: Forward

Playing career^{1}
Years	Club	Games (Goals)
2010–2014	Port Adelaide	29 (31)
- ^{1} Playing statistics correct to the end of 2014.

Cameron Hitchcock (born 3 July 1990) is a former professional Australian rules footballer who played for the Port Adelaide Football Club in the Australian Football League (AFL).

Cameron was born on the Eyre Peninsula in the little country town of Elliston, South Australia, and lived there before moving to Adelaide with his family and attended Sacred Heart College, Adelaide.

He made his debut for Port in the opening round of the 2010 NAB Cup, impressing with his pace and goal sense.

In his first season, Hitchcock was elevated onto the senior list and played in 17 games, kicking 20 goals. He won Port Adelaide's best first-year player award. He was upgraded to the main list for the 2011 season. Hitchcock was delisted at the end of the 2014 season, after a string of shoulder, hamstring, and foot injuries derailed his career.

In 2016, Hitchcock played for the South Australian National Football League (SANFL) club South Adelaide and was selected in the 2016 West End SANFL State Team.
