= Daniel Motlop =

Former Australian rules footballer, businessman

- Motlop in 2026

Personal information
- Full name: Daniel Motlop
- Born: 16 March 1982 (age 44); Darwin, Northern Territory, Australia
- Original team: North Adelaide (SANFL)
- Height: 185 cm (6 ft 1 in)
- Weight: 90 kg (198 lb)
- Position: Forward

Playing career^{1}
Years	Club	Games (Goals)
2001–2005	Kangaroos	47 (53)
2006–2011	Port Adelaide	83 (155)
Total		130 (208)

Representative team honours
Years	Team	Games (Goals)
2007–2009	Indigenous All-Stars	2
2008	Dream Team	1 (2)

International team honours
2008	Australia	2
- ^{1} Playing statistics correct to the end of 2011.

Career highlights
- Port Adelaide leading goalkicker 2008; 2003 AFL Rising Star nominee

Daniel Motlop (born 16 March 1982) is a former Australian rules footballer who played a total of 130 senior games for the North Melbourne Football Club and the Port Adelaide Football Club in the Australian Football League (AFL). After leaving the AFL, Motlop played for the Wanderers Football Club in the Northern Territory Football League for some time.

An Indigenous Australian of the Larrakia people, Motlop is co-founder and general manager of a native foods business called Something Wild, established in 2016 and located in the Barossa Valley, South Australia.

== Early life and family ==
Daniel Motlop was born on 16 March 1982. He is a Larrakia man from Darwin, Northern Territory.

He is one of a number of family members to have played in the AFL. He is the younger brother of North Melbourne and Melbourne player Shannon, the older brother of Port Adelaide player Steven, and the cousin of fellow Port Adelaide player Marlon.

As of November 2021 Daniel's son Jesse plays for the Carlton Football Club.

== Football career ==
=== AFL ===
==== Kangaroos (2001–2005) ====
Playing as a defender or forward, Motlop debuted in 2001 for the Kangaroos and was traded to Port Adelaide at the end of 2005 due to a desire to return to South Australia.

==== Port Adelaide (2006–2011) ====
In late 2005 Motlop was traded to Port Adelaide. In the 2007 season, Motlop suffered from an ankle injury in Round 1 and a broken collarbone in Round 9. However, he came back in Round 13 against Brisbane and kicked a career best 6 goals to help set up Port's win, including a goal of the year nomination.

In the 2008 AFL season he ranked 10th on the list of most goals kicked in the AFL, including a career best 7-goal game against Essendon and a 5-goal game against Fremantle, including a candidate for goal of the year.

The 2009 season saw Motlop average 2 goals a game in the 11 games he played, but he missed most of the second half of the season with a fractured ankle. Surgery to his ankle prevented him from returning to the Power side until Round 7, 2010, where he kicked 3.1 goals. He was delisted by the Power at the end of the 2011 season, marking an end to his 83 games and 155 goals with the club.

=== Post-AFL football career ===
His post-AFL career has included stints with the Wanderers Football Club in the Northern Territory Football League.

== Business career: Something Wild ==
In 2016 Motlop became general manager and part-owner of a native foods business, Something Wild, located in the Barossa Valley. His brothers Steven and Shannon, and their father Eddie, are also involved in the enterprise, and his cousin Marlon was also involved in the business as of August 2022.

The food and beverage company specialises in Indigenous Australian foods, including game meats and native greens, and supply restaurants and consumers across the country. These include magpie goose, kangaroo, wild boar, green ants, native greens, herbs and spices, kakadu plums, and red bush apples. It also provides employment and training opportunities to Indigenous Australians.

== Recognition and awards ==
Motlop won the 2023 NAIDOC Week award for Innovation, for being the driving force behind Something Wild.
