= Ben Jacobs (Australian rules footballer) =

Australian rules footballer (born 1992)

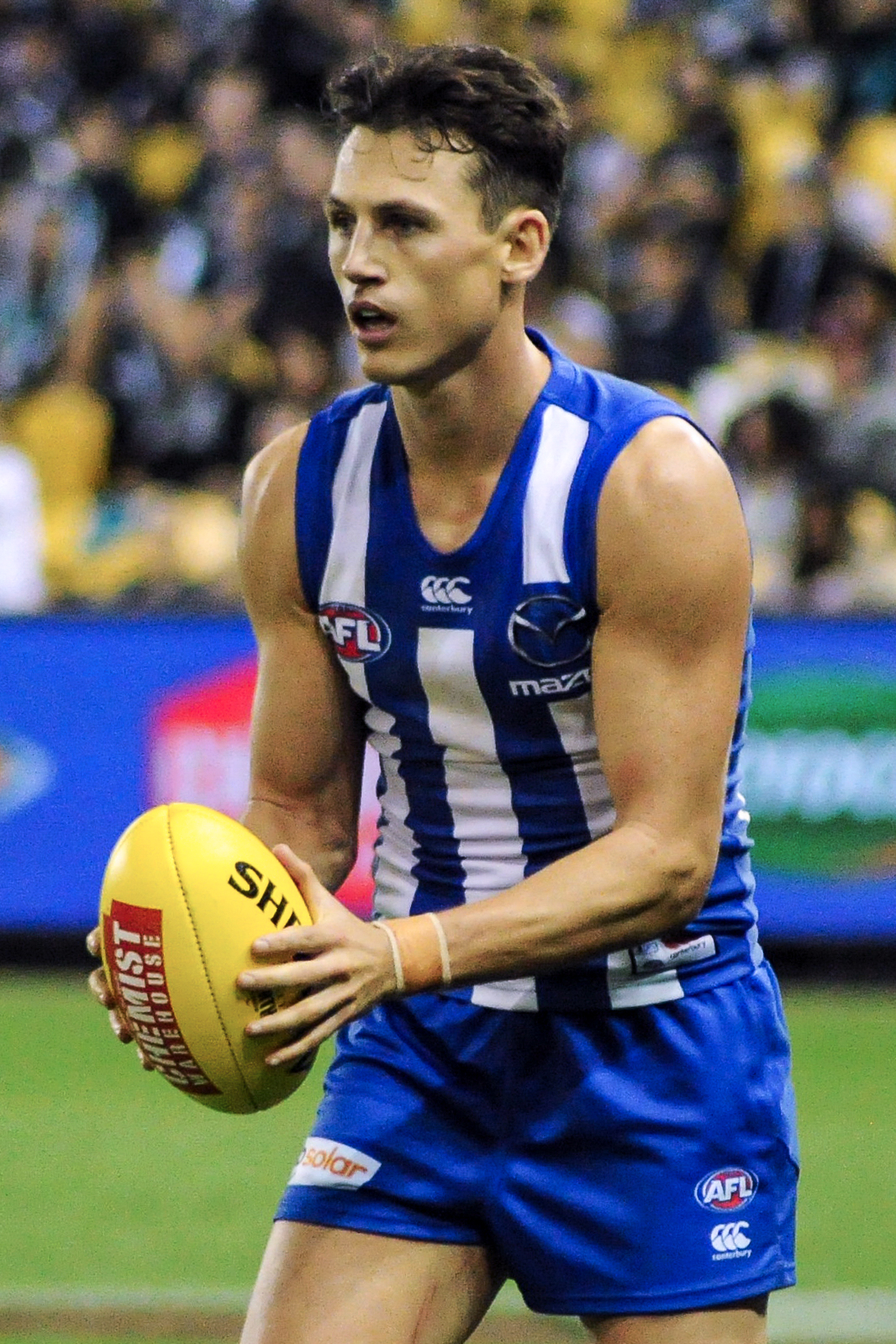
- Jacobs playing for North Melbourne in April 2018

Personal information
- Full name: Ben Jacobs
- Born: 9 January 1992 (age 34)
- Original team: Sandringham Dragons (TAC Cup)
- Draft: #16, 2010 National draft, Port Adelaide
- Height: 185 cm (6 ft 1 in)
- Weight: 85 kg (187 lb)

Club information
- Current club: North Melbourne
- Number: 5

Playing career^{1}
Years	Club	Games (Goals)
2011–2012	Port Adelaide	26 (5)
2013–2020	North Melbourne	64 (10)
Total		90 (15)
- ^{1} Playing statistics correct to the end of 2018.

Ben Jacobs (born 9 January 1992) is a former professional Australian rules footballer who played for the Port Adelaide Football Club and the North Melbourne Football Club in the Australian Football League (AFL).

From the Sandringham Dragons in the TAC Cup, Jacobs was Port Adelaide's first selection and the 16th overall selection in the 2010 AFL draft. He is known for his excellent marking with great core strength, having the ability to run all day and execute by hand. Jacobs won All-Australian honours in the 2010 NAB AFL U18 Championships and averaged 29 disposals at 69 percent efficiency, including a 47 possession game against South Australia.

He was given the number 16 guernsey, by retired Port Adelaide premiership captain, Warren Tredrea.

Jacobs was predicted to make his debut in the opening round of the 2011 AFL season, however he contracted glandular fever during the pre-season and was admitted to hospital for five days. He recovered from the illness and made his debut in Round 8.

During the 2012 season Trade Period, Jacobs requested a trade to North Melbourne which did not happen. Soon after, Jacobs announced that he would not be re-signing with Port and that he would be entering the National Draft.

In the 2012 National AFL Draft, Jacobs was taken at Pick 37 by North Melbourne Football Club. Jacobs had 2 very mediocre seasons to start his career at North Melbourne but had a breakout season in 2015, as he developed into the team's tagger. He played in 23 games and performed shut down roles against Trent Cotchin, Dan Hannebery, Dylan Shiel and Nathan Jones.

Jacobs started off the 2016 season well, but in Round 8 injured his foot and didn't play a single AFL game for the rest of the year.

Jacobs was delisted by North Melbourne at the end of the 2020 AFL season after a mass delisting by North Melbourne which saw 11 players cut from the team's list.
