= Liam Anthony =

Australian rules footballer (born 1987)

Personal information
- Full name: Liam Michael Anthony
- Born: 9 September 1987 (age 39)
- Original team: East Fremantle (WAFL)
- Draft: No. 43, 2008 National Draft, North Melbourne
- Height: 189 cm (6 ft 2 in)
- Weight: 86 kg (190 lb)
- Position: Midfielder

Playing career^{1}
Years	Club	Games (Goals)
2009–2014	North Melbourne	58 (27)
- ^{1} Playing statistics correct to the end of 2014.

Liam Michael Anthony (born 9 September 1987) is an Australian rules footballer who played for the North Melbourne Football Club in the Australian Football League (AFL).

Originally from Geraldton, Western Australia, he was recruited from the East Fremantle in WAFL to North Melbourne with the 43rd selection in the 2008 AFL draft. His career to date has been plagued by injuries, with a stress fracture in his foot delaying his AFL debut until halfway through the 2009 season, a severed finger tendon interrupting his 2010 pre-season and dislocating his shoulder during the 2010 season.

In Anthony's senior AFL debut for North Melbourne in Round 13 2009, he gathered 28 possessions. He played every game for the rest of the year, averaging 25 disposals per game.

On 31 October 2014 it was announced that Anthony had been delisted by the North Melbourne Football Club.
