= Domenic Cassisi =

Australian rules footballer

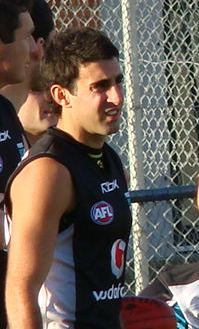

Personal information
- Full name: Domenic Cassisi
- Born: 22 September 1982 (age 44); Western Australia
- Original team: East Fremantle (WAFL)
- Height: 184 cm (6 ft 0 in)
- Weight: 85 kg (187 lb)
- Position: Midfield

Playing career^{1}
Years	Club	Games (Goals)
2002–2014	Port Adelaide	228 (74)
- ^{1} Playing statistics correct to the end of 2014.

Career highlights
- AFL premiership player: 2004; Port Adelaide Captain: 2009–2012; Showdown Medal (Round 17): 2010; Fos Willams Medal: 2008, 2009, 2010, 2011; Merv Agars Medal: 2010

Domenic Cassisi (born 22 September 1982) is a former premiership winning Australian rules footballer with the Port Adelaide Football Club, and was the club's 62nd captain from 2009 to 2012. He was recruited in the 2000 AFL draft with pick 50, and is a member of Port Adelaide's 2004 premiership side.

== AFL career ==
=== Early career (2002–2003) ===
Between 2002 and 2003 Cassisi only played 18 games and had restricted ground time despite his excellent game on debut he needed training before the 2004 season arrived.

=== Career high (2004–2005) ===
In 2004 his career took a step forward, playing all 25 games and enjoying good form whilst also playing a major role in the club's 2004 premiership win. In 2005 he repeated his efforts, having another excellent year by averaging 16 disposals a game and gathering 57 more possessions than the year before. He also polled third in the club's best and fairest award.

=== Injury (2006) ===
In 2006 Cassisi missed seven games due to injury, but found just enough form in his limited game time to uphold his reputation as one of the most important players at the club. However, at season's end he lost his spot as vice captain.

=== Leadership (2007–2008) ===
After another excellent season in 2007, Cassisi accepted a three-year deal with the club, ensuring that he would stay with Port until 2010. He also was reinstated as Vice Captain. In 2008 he undoubtedly played his best season, averaging 22.7 possessions and 6.3 tackles per game and finishing second in the club best and fairest (career best). He also found himself being handed the club captaincy from Warren Tredrea, who stepped down.

=== Captaincy (2009–2012) ===
In 2009, Cassisi was named captain of the club succeeding Warren Tredrea and replacing the #25 guernsey he had worn since debut. He finished fourth in the John Cahill Medal in 2009.

=== Final years (2013–2014) ===
Before the 2013 season, Cassisi handed the captaincy to Travis Boak and returned to the number #25 guernsey.

Cassisi officially retired from the AFL on 17 July 2014 and played his final game in a three-point win against Melbourne in round 18.

== Playing statistics ==
Legend
G	Goals	K	Kicks	D	Disposals	T	Tackles
B	Behinds	H	Handballs	M	Marks

Season	Team	No.	Games	Totals							Averages (per game)						
Season	Team	No.	Games	G	B	K	H	D	M	T	G	B	K	H	D	M	T
2002	Port Adelaide	25	6	0	1	15	14	29	2	6	0.0	0.2	2.5	2.3	4.8	0.3	1.0
2003	Port Adelaide	25	12	1	2	59	34	93	25	18	0.1	0.2	4.9	2.8	7.8	2.1	1.5
2004	Port Adelaide	25	25	15	11	196	137	333	70	56	0.6	0.4	7.8	5.5	13.3	2.8	2.2
2005	Port Adelaide	25	24	15	11	219	171	390	77	49	0.6	0.5	9.1	7.1	16.3	3.2	2.0
2006	Port Adelaide	25	15	6	6	141	118	259	58	50	0.4	0.4	9.4	7.9	17.3	3.9	3.3
2007	Port Adelaide	25	25	7	8	259	270	529	106	112	0.3	0.3	10.4	10.8	21.2	4.2	4.5
2008	Port Adelaide	25	21	10	3	225	252	477	62	133	0.5	0.1	10.7	12.0	22.7	3.0	6.3
2009	Port Adelaide	1	21	8	7	188	282	470	65	160	0.4	0.3	9.0	13.4	22.4	3.1	7.6
2010	Port Adelaide	1	22	5	3	207	261	468	57	176	0.2	0.1	9.4	11.9	21.3	2.6	8.0
2011	Port Adelaide	1	13	6	4	129	128	257	30	102	0.5	0.3	9.9	9.8	19.8	2.3	7.8
2012	Port Adelaide	1	19	0	3	185	180	365	64	88	0.0	0.2	9.7	9.5	19.2	3.4	4.6
2013	Port Adelaide	25	12	0	0	79	87	166	24	48	0.0	0.0	6.6	7.3	13.8	2.0	4.0
2014	Port Adelaide	25	13	1	3	78	101	179	30	46	0.1	0.2	6.0	7.8	13.8	2.3	3.5
Career			228	74	62	1980	2035	4015	670	1044	0.3	0.3	8.7	8.9	17.6	2.9	4.6
