= Tom Jonas =

Australian rules footballer

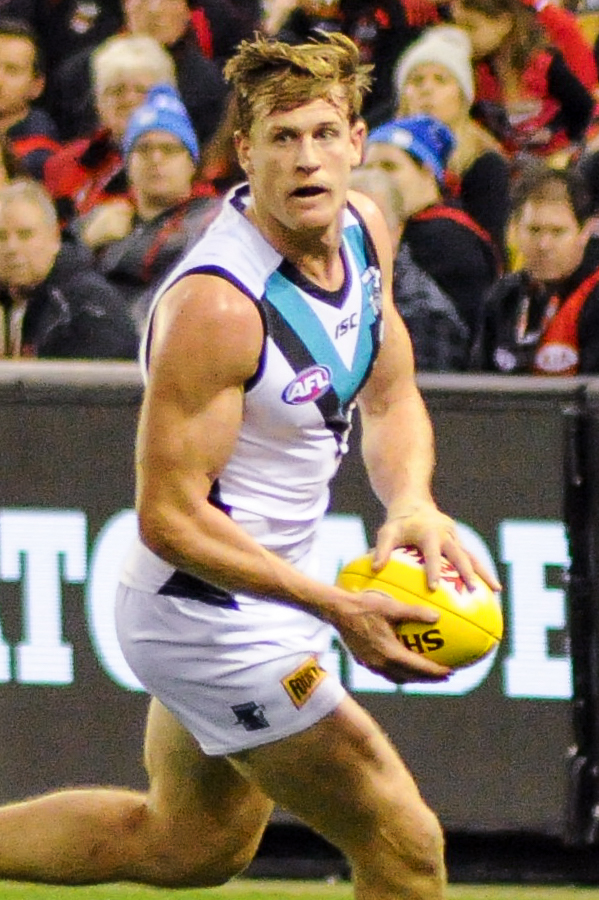
- Jonas playing for Port Adelaide in June 2017

Personal information
- Full name: Thomas Jonas
- Born: 9 January 1991 (age 35)
- Original team: Rostrevor College / Norwood (SANFL)
- Draft: No. 16, 2011 rookie draft
- Height: 188 cm (6 ft 2 in)
- Weight: 89 kg (196 lb)
- Position: Key defender

Playing career^{1}
Years	Club	Games (Goals)
2011–2023	Port Adelaide	216 (2)
- ^{1} Playing statistics correct to the end of the 2023 season.

Career highlights
- Port Adelaide captain: 2019–2023

Thomas Jonas (born 9 January 1991) is a former professional Australian rules football player who played for the Port Adelaide Football Club in the Australian Football League (AFL).

== AFL career ==
Jonas made his first appearance at the senior level in the 2011 AFL season. Jonas, along with former teammate John Butcher, made his debut in round 21, against Hawthorn where Port Adelaide were defeated by 165 points. To date, it remains the worst defeat suffered by any player in his debut match in VFL/AFL history.

He was suspended for six matches in 2016 for intentionally striking West Coast's Andrew Gaff, leaving Gaff unconscious for two minutes. After his suspension expired, Jonas missed the rest of the season due to a hamstring injury. In 2018, he said that "it felt like he was suspended for half a year".

Jonas was appointed co-captain alongside teammate Ollie Wines in the 2019 season. The following year he assumed sole responsibility for the captaincy, with Wines made vice-captain.

In August 2023, Jonas announced that he would retire following the conclusion of the 2023 season.

== Statistics ==
Updated to end of the 2023 season.

Legend
G	Goals	K	Kicks	D	Disposals	T	Tackles
B	Behinds	H	Handballs	M	Marks

Season	Team	No.	Games	Totals							Averages (per game)						
Season	Team	No.	Games	G	B	K	H	D	M	T	G	B	K	H	D	M	T
2011	Port Adelaide	42	4	0	0	10	21	31	3	8	0.0	0.0	2.5	5.25	7.75	0.75	2.0
2012	Port Adelaide	42	9	0	0	47	48	95	21	23	0.0	0.0	5.2	5.33	10.5	2.3	2.6
2013	Port Adelaide	42	21	0	1	125	140	265	66	49	0.0	0.0	6.0	6.7	12.6	3.14	2.3
2014	Port Adelaide	42	22	1	0	189	144	333	111	48	0.04	0.0	8.6	5.18	15.1	5.0	2.2
2015	Port Adelaide	42	17	0	0	100	128	228	62	39	0.0	0.0	5.9	7.52	13.4	3.6	2.3
2016	Port Adelaide	42	9	0	1	63	51	114	32	20	0.0	0.1	7.0	5.7	12.6	3.6	2.2
2017	Port Adelaide	42	21	0	0	186	100	286	111	54	0.0	0.0	8.9	4.8	13.6	5.3	2.6
2018	Port Adelaide	42	18	0	0	215	86	301	141	35	0.0	0.0	11.9	4.8	16.7	7.8	1.9
2019	Port Adelaide	42	18	0	0	197	86	283	95	36	0.0	0.0	10.9	4.8	15.7	5.3	2.0
2020 (Note: The 2020 season was played with 17 home-and-away matches per team (down from 22) and 16-minute quarters with time on (down from 20-minute quarters with time on) due to the impact of the COVID-19 pandemic.)	Port Adelaide	1	19	0	1	138	68	206	76	30	0.0	0.1	7.3	0.3	10.8	4.0	1.6
2021	Port Adelaide	1	24	0	0	260	94	354	133	37	0.0	0.0	10.8	3.9	14.8	5.5	1.5
2022	Port Adelaide	1	21	0	0	166	85	251	107	47	0.0	0.0	7.9	4.1	12.0	5.1	2.2
2023	Port Adelaide	1	13	1	0	63	36	99	44	19	0.1	0.0	4.9	2.8	7.6	3.4	1.5
Career			216	2	3	1758	1086	2844	1002	445	0.0	0.0	8.1	5.0	13.2	4.6	2.1

== Personal life ==
Jonas is a Law graduate, having completed his study at The University of Adelaide.
