= Jesse Palmer (Australian footballer) =

Australian rules footballer (born 1996)

Personal information
- Full name: Jesse Palmer
- Born: 17 October 1996 (age 30)
- Original team: North Ballarat Rebels (TAC Cup)
- Draft: No. 78, 2014 national draft
- Debut: Round 21, 2016, Port Adelaide vs. Melbourne, at Adelaide Oval
- Height: 188 cm (6 ft 2 in)
- Weight: 86 kg (190 lb)
- Position: Forward

Playing career^{1}
Years	Club	Games (Goals)
2015–2017	Port Adelaide	3 (1)
- ^{1} Playing statistics correct to the end of 2017.

Jesse Palmer (born 17 October 1996) is a former professional Australian rules footballer who played for the Port Adelaide Football Club in the Australian Football League (AFL). He was drafted by the Port Adelaide Football Club with their third selection and seventy-eighth overall in the 2014 national draft. He made his debut in the forty point loss against Melbourne in round 21, 2016 at the Adelaide Oval. He was delisted by Port Adelaide at the conclusion of the 2017 season.
