= Tom Logan (footballer) =

Australian rules footballer

Personal information
- Full name: Thomas Logan
- Born: 2 July 1985 (age 41)
- Original team: Waratah (NTFL)
- Draft: No. 49, 2003 national draft, Brisbane Lions; No. 52, 2006 rookie draft, Port Adelaide; No. 34, 2015 rookie draft, Port Adelaide
- Height: 183 cm (6 ft 0 in)
- Weight: 83 kg (183 lb)
- Position: Defender

Playing career^{1}
Years	Club	Games (Goals)
2004–2005	Brisbane Lions	3 (0)
2006–2014	Port Adelaide	114 (27)
Total		117 (27)
- ^{1} Playing statistics correct to the end of 2015.

Thomas Logan (born 2 July 1985) is a former professional Australian rules footballer who played for the Brisbane Lions and Port Adelaide Football Club in the Australian Football League (AFL).

== AFL career ==
=== Brisbane Lions career (2005) ===
He was picked up originally by the Brisbane Lions in the 2003 AFL draft, at selection number 65 overall. He made his debut for the Brisbane Lions against Port Adelaide in Round 2 of the 2005 AFL season. His two years spent on the Brisbane Lions list were injury ridden. He only played two more games for the club before being delisted at the end of that year.

=== Port Adelaide career (2006–2015) ===
At the end of 2005, Logan went back to South Australia, he was then given an offer to train with Port Adelaide over the preseason. He was given a lifeline by Port Adelaide, as they picked him up as a rookie for the 2006 AFL season, on a one-year contract.

Power player Gavin Wanganeen retired from AFL in 2006, and Tom got his chance, elevated to the senior list because of Gavin's retirement. He made his debut for Port Adelaide in Round 15 against Geelong, and played 8 games straight before the end of the season, kicking the two goals.

He was upgraded to the senior list for the 2007 AFL season, and played the first 4 games of the year. He then didn't play a game until the round 21 match against Geelong, where he helped Port Adelaide stop Geelong's unbeaten run of 14 straight wins. He was kept in the side that beat Fremantle the next week, and West Coast the week after.

In the 2007 Preliminary Final, he kicked 2 goals and had 23 possessions in an almost best on ground performance, helping Port Adelaide to reach the 2007 Grand Final. In the 2007 Grand Final, he managed to kick 1 goal. Logan was delisted by Port at the end of the 2014 season but was later re-drafted as a rookie by the club.

Logan announced his retirement at the end of the 2015 season.

== Playing statistics ==
Legend
G	Goals	K	Kicks	D	Disposals	T	Tackles
B	Behinds	H	Handballs	M	Marks

Season	Team	No.	Games	Totals							Averages (per game)						
Season	Team	No.	Games	G	B	K	H	D	M	T	G	B	K	H	D	M	T
2005	Brisbane Lions	4	3	0	1	11	7	18	2	3	0.0	0.3	3.7	2.3	6.0	0.7	1.0
2006	Port Adelaide	44	8	2	4	46	53	99	39	19	0.3	0.5	5.8	6.6	12.4	4.9	2.4
2007	Port Adelaide	44	9	3	6	56	61	117	39	20	0.3	0.7	6.2	6.8	13.0	4.3	2.2
2008	Port Adelaide	44	19	4	2	178	161	339	114	42	0.2	0.1	9.4	8.5	17.8	6.0	2.2
2009	Port Adelaide	44	15	7	6	104	104	208	63	28	0.5	0.4	6.9	6.9	13.9	4.2	1.9
2010	Port Adelaide	44	18	4	5	145	178	323	93	48	0.2	0.3	8.1	9.9	17.9	5.2	2.7
2011	Port Adelaide	44	20	2	3	154	128	282	88	44	0.1	0.2	7.7	6.4	14.1	4.4	2.2
2012	Port Adelaide	44	12	0	1	86	101	187	54	20	0.0	0.1	7.2	8.4	15.6	4.5	1.7
2013	Port Adelaide	44	10	5	3	76	94	170	45	26	0.5	0.3	7.6	9.4	17.0	4.5	2.6
2014	Port Adelaide	44	3	0	0	30	21	51	18	9	0.0	0.0	10.0	7.0	17.0	6.0	3.0
2015	Port Adelaide	44	0	—	—	—	—	—	—	—	—	—	—	—	—	—	—
Career			117	27	31	886	908	1794	555	259	0.2	0.3	7.6	7.8	15.3	4.7	2.2
