= Justin Westhoff =

Australian rules footballer (born 1986)

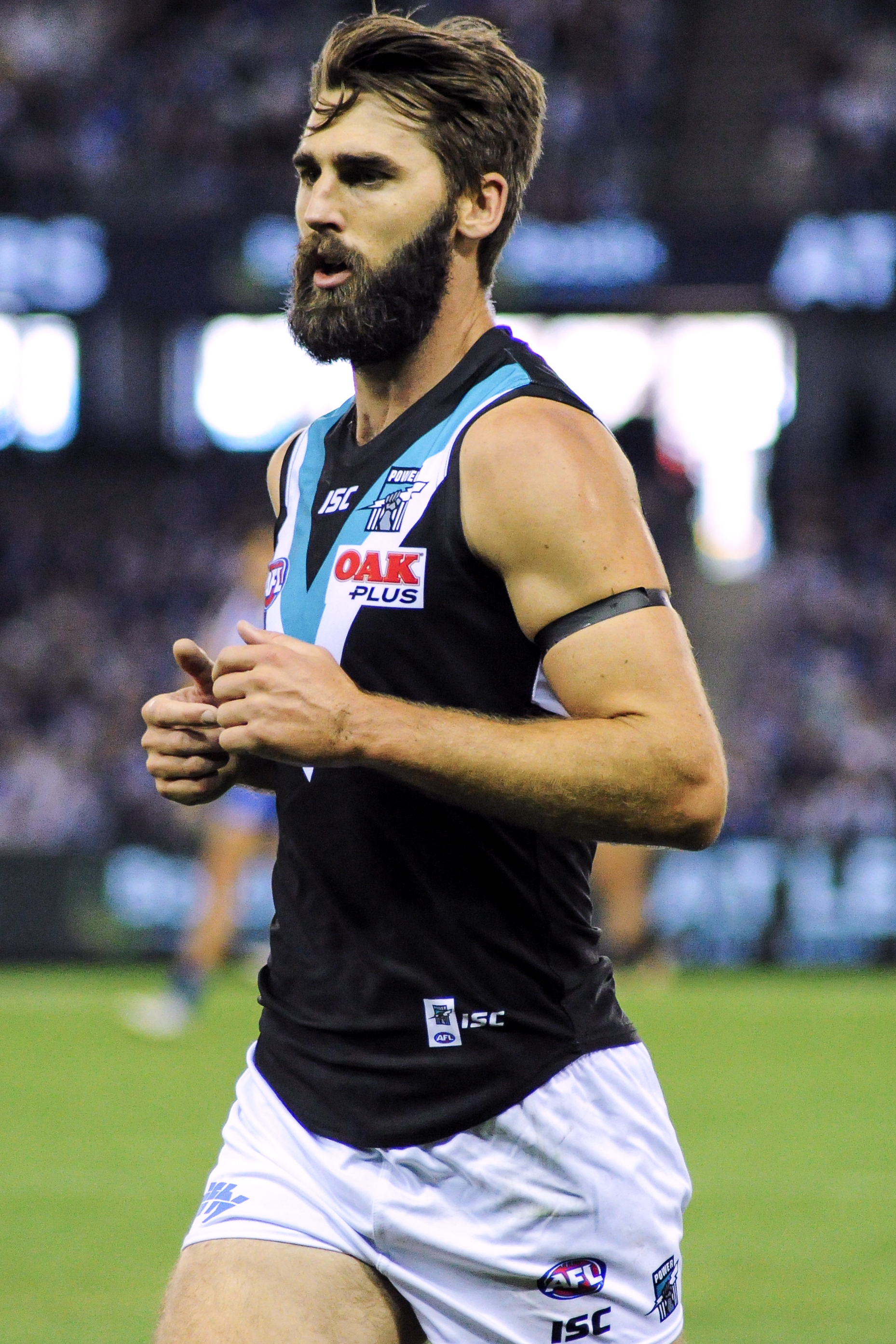
- Westhoff playing for Port Adelaide in June 2018

Personal information
- Full name: Justin Westhoff
- Born: 1 October 1986 (age 40); South Australia
- Original team: Central District (SANFL)
- Draft: No. 71, 2006 National Draft
- Height: 199 cm (6 ft 6 in)
- Weight: 96 kg (212 lb)
- Position: Utility

Playing career^{1}
Years	Club	Games (Goals)
2007–2020	Port Adelaide	280 (313)
- ^{1} Playing statistics correct to the end of round 9, 2020.

Career highlights
- John Cahill Medal (2018); Gavin Wanganeen Medal (2007); Showdown Medal (2011); 2007 AFL Rising Star nominee

Justin Westhoff (born 1 October 1986) is a former Australian rules footballer who played for the Port Adelaide Football Club in the AFL. He also played for the Central District Football Club in the SANFL. He is the older brother of Matthew Westhoff and younger brother of Leigh Westhoff. Westhoff was selected by Port Adelaide in the 2006 draft using their fifth-round pick, being the 71st pick overall.

== Early life ==
Westhoff was born in the rural South Australian town of Eudunda, where he lived until the age of three. His family then moved to Tanunda in the Barossa Valley. His younger brother Matthew and older brother Leigh played for Central Districts in the SANFL league. Matthew played with the Port Adelaide Football Club alongside his brother Justin; he played just six games in his short career with Port and was delisted at the end of the 2011 season. His cousin, Nick Westhoff, was rookie-listed by Richmond in 2010 but didn't play an AFL game.

== AFL career ==
=== 2007 ===
When drafted to the Power, Westhoff's appointed player-mentor was skipper Warren Tredrea.

On 17 April, Westhoff was controversially suspended for two games for high contact on North Adelaide captain Darryl Wintle during Central District's 7-goal defeat of the Roosters in Round 1 of the SANFL. The suspension effectively prevented him from playing for three weeks, as Central District had a bye during that period.

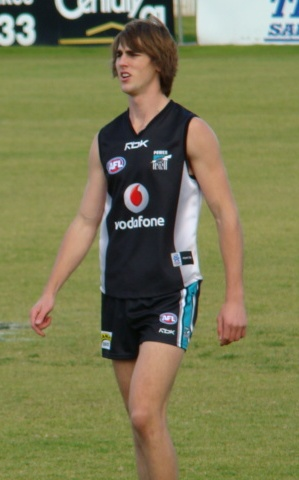
Westhoff in 2007.

On 3 June, Westhoff's consistent goalkicking dominance at local level saw him make his AFL debut for Port Adelaide against Hawthorn. He performed strongly on début, booting three goals (including two from his first two kicks) to become the first Power player to register a trio of majors on début. Westhoff was also reported for charging the Hawks' Clinton Young in the last quarter; however, this was later dismissed by the match review panel, as they deemed the contact unintentional and unavoidable.

Westhoff had his career-best game against the West Coast Eagles in round 15, on 14 July, kicking four goals, including two from contested marks on eventual All-Australian full back Darren Glass. Power coach Mark Williams praised the performance by calling his forward line work 'brilliant'. Westhoff's performance was further recognised with the AFL rising star nomination for Round 15. He has equalled his personal best 4-goal haul 6 times but never has scored as many points in a game as Round 15, 2007.

Westhoff's strong season ended up with him finishing 4th in the 2007 AFL Rising Star competition, garnering a total of 10 votes. He was also recognised with the Gavin Wanganeen Medal and the Best First-Year Player award at the Power's club champion venue.

Westhoff played in Port Adelaide's losing AFL grand final side of 2007 at the MCG. His opponent on the day, Matthew Scarlett, had 30 possessions, while Westhoff was unable to have any impact on the game, frequently being pushed off in contests due to his slight stature. This prompted him to bulk up in following years to improve his contested-marking abilities and allowing him to frequently kick bags of goals. Port Adelaide refused to allow him to play in Central Districts' winning Grand Final side the following week, effectively not allowing him to win a premiership with the club where he and his brothers had played all of their junior football.

=== 2008–2009 ===
The 2008 season saw Westhoff play a different role to the 2007 season in which he played more up the ground, unlike the previous season where he played a lot closer to the goals. As a result, Westhoff's goal kicking average saw a decline, only managing 22 goals in 21 games for the season, however this role increased his average of disposals up from 8.9 to 11.3; and marks up from 4.6 to 5.7 a game.

On 7 May Westhoff signed a three-year contract extension to stay with the Power until the end of the 2011 season.

At one stage, Westhoff was also dropped from the Power's lineup in the round 13 game against the Richmond Tigers due to poor form. However, he found his way back into the side the week after, by kicking 3 goals for the Central District.

Averaging 2.5 goals a game in the preseason, Westhoff was named in the Power's starting 18 against the Bombers for round 1, where he performed strongly, kicking 3 goals and picking up 15 disposals (including 10 marks). However, in round 2, he fractured his foot and was out for six weeks, being placed on the long-term injury list. He returned in round 11 after a late withdrawal from Robert Gray, and despite not having played any games since the injury, still managed to kick two goals as well as 16 disposals (including 10 marks). He finished the season kicking 20 goals in 13 games.

=== 2010–2011 ===
The 2010 season saw Westhoff play as a ruckman, in a position made vacant by Brendon Lade, who retired. He proved himself to still be a valuable part of the Power's forwardline, dominating in Showdown XXVIII, leading the Power in goalkicking with three goals in the third quarter. His scoring efforts put the game out of reach of the Adelaide Crows. After Round 10, 2010, he was dropped due to a poor performance in the previous game. In the return match of Showdown XXIX, he returned to his form of early in the season with four goals that gave the Power the win. He carried this form into the following week's game against Hawthorn, in which his strong performance earned him a spot in the AFL Team of the Week.

In round 4 of 2011, Westhoff won the Showdown Medal.

=== 2013–2020 ===
The 2013 season saw Westhoff play as a Centre half-forward but also drop into defence when required by newly appointed coach Ken Hinkley. He started well and was tipped for a high Brownlow placing after just 4 games, where he played well and saw Port Adelaide also going undefeated for the first 5 games of the season. Westhoff remained a key player in later games, but his impact died off and his place in the team became dubious before a run of good form saw him become a key player. He also established himself well in the two finals games he played against Collingwood and Geelong. His good season saw him come 5th in Port Adelaide's prestigious John Cahill medal, with 199 votes. He capped off a good season with 31 goals and 7 Brownlow votes.

Westhoff performed consistently well again in 2014, enjoying another strong year. Playing every game, he registered career highs in both marks and disposals. He played as a wingman who pinch-hit as a mobile forward. Westhoff started the season with 20 disposals, 8 marks, and 5 goals against the Blues. This was the first of 7 games where he registered 20 or more disposals and 2 or more goals in a game.

In season 2015, with the addition of Paddy Ryder, his time as both a forward and a relief ruckman became limited. As such, he became something of a roaming wingman. He struggled early in the year, both in terms of finding the football and hitting the scoreboard, kicking only 5 goals in the first 8 games. But as the season went on, Westhoff gathered momentum. He was a key player in Port's win over Collingwood, with an absolutely dominant first half, and was best on ground against Fremantle in the final game of the season.

Season 2018 saw him play multiple roles such as a pinch-hitter in the ruck, a safe marker in defence, and swingman on the wing. His consistency was positive to the team throughout the season, and his outstanding season eventually earned him the John Cahill Medal at the age of 32; Ken Hinkley said of the achievement, "I've never known a more deserving player". He is currently the oldest player in the club's list.

== Honours and achievements ==
Team

- McClelland Trophy (Port Adelaide) 2020

Individual

- John Cahill Medal (2018)
- Gavin Wanganeen Medal (2007)
- Showdown Medal (2011)
- 2007 AFL Rising Star nominee

== Playing style ==
At 200 cm, Westhoff was capable of playing any position on the ground. His ability to roam across the field made him a very versatile player.
