= David Rodan =

Australian rules footballer and goal umpire (born 1983)

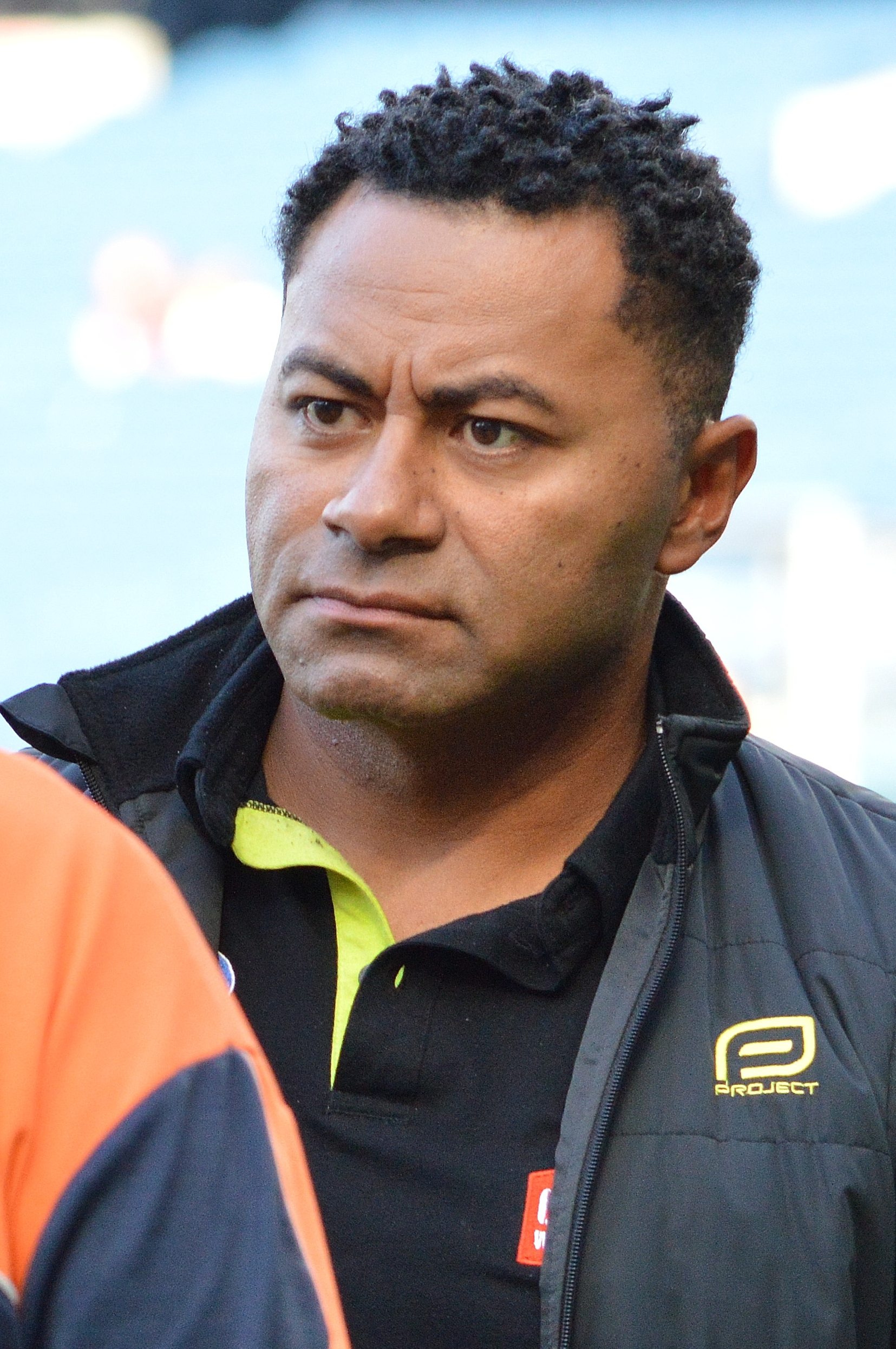
- Rodan in May 2026

Personal information
- Full name: David Rodan
- Born: 8 October 1983 (age 43); Fiji
- Original team: Calder Cannons (TAC Cup)
- Draft: No. 33, 2001 National Draft, Richmond; No. 86, 2006 National Draft, Port Adelaide
- Height: 173 cm (5 ft 8 in)
- Weight: 87 kg (192 lb)
- Position: Midfielder

Playing career^{1}
Years	Club	Games (Goals)	
2002–2006	Richmond	65 (43)	
2007–2012	Port Adelaide	111 (86)	
2013	Melbourne	9 (2)	
Total		185 (131)	

International team honours
Years	Team	Games (Goals)	
2008	Australia	2 (0)	

Umpiring career
Years	League	Role	Games
2017–	AFL	Goal umpire	114
- ^{1} Playing statistics correct to the end of 2013.

Career highlights
- Peter Badcoe VC Medal 2010 round 5

David Rodan (born 8 October 1983) is an Australian rules football umpire and former professional player.

As a footballer, he played for the Richmond Football Club, Port Adelaide Football Club and Melbourne Football Club in the Australian Football League (AFL). Of Tongan heritage, Rodan was the first Fijian-born player to reach 100 AFL games.

== Early life ==
David Rodan was born in Fiji to mother Amelia and father David Sr, both of Tongan heritage. He spent his first year in the town of Lami near Suva. When he was three years old, his family moved to Australia. His father wanted him to play rugby union, but there were no rugby clubs for juniors in his area. Instead, he tried Aussie Rules, beginning junior football with Oak Park and the Holy Child Football Club in Broadmeadows, and he developed a passion for the sport.

Rodan rose through the junior ranks until dominating in the TAC Cup competition, winning back-to-back Morrish Medals (in 2000 and 2001).

== AFL career ==
=== Richmond (2001–2006) ===
Rodan was recruited by AFL club Richmond at the end of 2001 at pick 33. He played every game for two years (from his debut in 2002), and was nominated for the AFL Rising Star award in his debut season and kicked 17 goals of which three were nominated for the Goal of the Year award.

Playing for Richmond, he played as a small crumbing forward along with Andrew Krakouer in the early part of his career.

He became an Australian citizen in September 2002 in order to get a passport to travel to London, England, to participate in an Australian Football Exhibition Match against Essendon, as his Fijian passport had expired.

After the retirement of Matthew Knights, Rodan shifted into the midfield.

He did not participate in the 2005 regular season due to a severe knee injury. Rodan made a return to league football in 2006, but was delisted at the end of the season, first hearing of his sacking at the club's best and fairest function via an impromptu speech from captain Kane Johnson.

=== Port Adelaide (2007–2012) ===
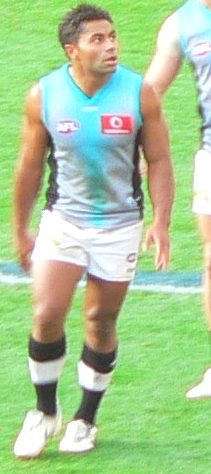
Rodan with Port Adelaide in 2007

Rodan was given a career lifeline when he was drafted by Port Adelaide with the final selection of the 2006 AFL draft.

Rodan did not miss a game in the 2007 season, which meant he played in the 2007 AFL Grand Final. He received six Brownlow Medal votes at the 2007 medal count, including a best-on-ground three votes for his round 12 performance, putting him in the top 60 players in the competition.

In a 2008 game against the Western Bulldogs, Rodan kicked what would have otherwise been a brilliant snap-shot goal and began to celebrate—the only problem being that it was towards the Bulldogs' goals and consequently was marked down as a rushed behind for the Bulldogs.

Rodan ruptured an anterior cruciate ligament in a training injury in December 2009 and was expected to miss the entire 2010 season. However, following ligament augmentation and reconstruction surgery, which replaced the torn ligament with one made of polyester fibres, Rodan was able to play in round six, 2010.

=== Melbourne (2013) ===
Rodan was traded to the Melbourne Football Club on 25 October 2012. Port Adelaide had initially stated that he had been delisted, but had not formally lodged the paperwork with the AFL, allowing a trade to be made between Port Adelaide and Melbourne. He was traded for Pick no. 88 in the 2012 AFL draft.

Rodan announced his retirement after he again ruptured his anterior cruciate ligament, in Round 22 against the Adelaide Crows.

=== West Preston Lakeside (2015) ===
Rodan teamed up with Northern Football Netball League team West Preston Lakeside for a two-year period in 2015 and played a total of 16 games.

=== VFL/AFL Goal Umpiring (2016–present) ===
In March 2016, Rodan began training as a VFL goal umpire with the intention of becoming an AFL-listed goal umpire by 2017. This training opportunity presented itself through the Scanlon Foundation's assistance to introduce people of more indigenous and multicultural backgrounds to Australian rules umpiring. He did so, and on 25 July 2025 reached his 300th game milestone as a player and umpire. He often has a smile when signalling a goal and once did the worm at a charity match in Darwin.

== Post-AFL career ==
Rodan won the fourteenth season of Dancing with the Stars.
