= John Butcher (Australian footballer) =

Australian rules footballer (born 1991)

Personal information
- Full name: John Butcher
- Nickname: Clean Hands
- Born: 3 July 1991 (age 35); Maffra, Victoria, Australia
- Original team: Gippsland Power (TAC Cup)
- Draft: No. 8, 2009 National Draft, Port Adelaide
- Height: 197 cm (6 ft 6 in)
- Weight: 90 kg (198 lb)
- Position: Forward

Playing career^{1}
Years	Club	Games (Goals)
2010–2016	Port Adelaide	31 (41)
- ^{1} Playing statistics correct to the end of 2016.

John Butcher (born 3 July 1991) is an Australian former professional footballer who played for Port Adelaide in the Australian Football League (AFL). He was drafted by Port Adelaide with pick 8 in the first round of the 2009 AFL draft.

== Professional career ==
Butcher was born in Maffra, Victoria. Known for his speed, agility, and marking skills, he was nicknamed "Clean Hands". At the AFL Draft Camp, he ran 20-metre sprints at high speeds and completed the repeat sprint test in 24.88 seconds, ranking within the top 28 percent of participants in that category. He kicked 40 goals in 16 games while playing for Gippsland Power and Vic Country. He represented Vic Country Under-18s in 2008 and 2009, including kicking three goals against Vic Metro in 2009. Butcher is an AIS-AFL Academy graduate.

Butcher made his debut in Round 21 alongside future captain Tom Jonas, following a period affected by injuries and training setbacks. Port Adelaide was defeated by Hawthorn by a club-record 165 points in this match. In his second match against the Western Bulldogs, he kicked six straight goals from six disposals. Despite being nicknamed 'The Future' by supporters, Butcher struggled to establish himself as a regular AFL player. Butcher played the first three games of the 2014 season, scoring two goals before being returned to the South Australian National Football League (SANFL), where he finished the season after being hospitalised in August for viral meningitis.

In 2015, Butcher's form in the SANFL varied; he played only one AFL match in Round 1. However, with Jay Schulz, a late exclusion in Round 20, Butcher returned to the senior side against Greater Western Sydney and played the final four matches of the AFL season. After gathering 6 contested marks and 7 marks inside 50 against Gold Coast and Fremantle in the final two matches, he was offered a one-year contract for 2016.

After the 2016 season, he was delisted and went on to sign with the Central District Football Club in the SANFL for the 2017 season. In 2018, Butcher and his brother Danny joined the NTFL’s Nightcliff Football Club, where they were part of the premiership-winning team. That same year, he also contributed to his hometown club Maffra securing their ninth premiership in 18 years.
