= Cam O'Shea =

Australian rules footballer (born 1992)

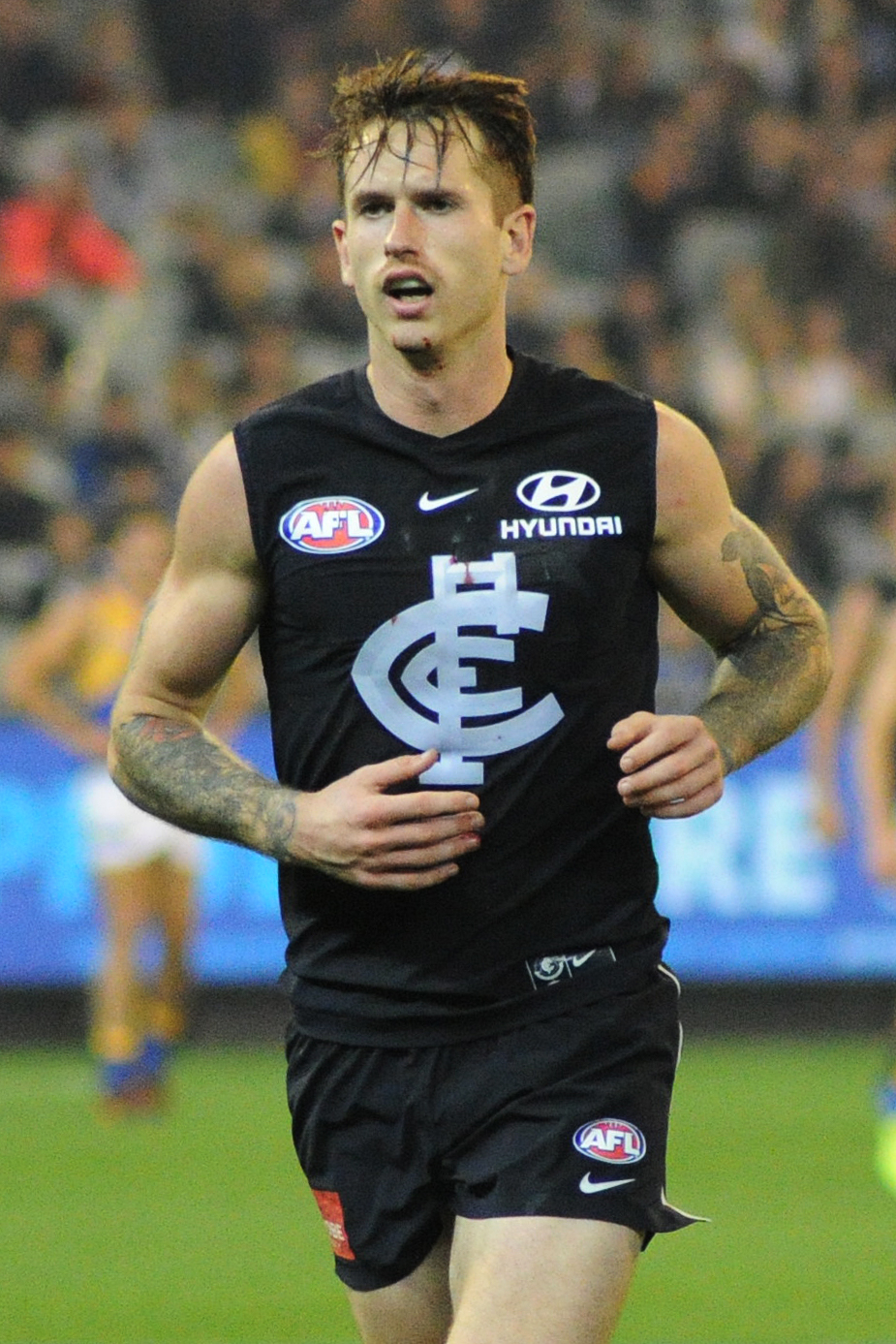
- O'Shea playing for Carlton in April 2018

Personal information
- Full name: Cameron O'Shea
- Born: 13 March 1992 (age 34)
- Original team: Eastern Ranges (TAC Cup)
- Draft: No. 52, 2010 national draft
- Height: 193 cm (6 ft 4 in)
- Weight: 91 kg (201 lb)
- Position: Defender

Playing career^{1}
Years	Club	Games (Goals)
2011–2016	Port Adelaide	81 (7)
2018	Carlton	11 (0)
Total		92 (7)
- ^{1} Playing statistics correct to the end of 2018.

Cameron O'Shea (born 13 March 1992) is a former professional Australian rules footballer who played for the Port Adelaide Football Club and Carlton Football Club in the Australian Football League (AFL).

== AFL career ==
Drafted in the third round with the fifty-second overall selection in the 2010 AFL draft from the Eastern Ranges in the TAC Cup, O'Shea made his AFL debut with Port Adelaide in 2011, playing 18 games that year. In 2012, however, he spent some time playing for South Adelaide in the South Australian National Football League (SANFL) and finished the year injured with stress fractures in his foot. At the conclusion of the 2016 AFL season, he was delisted by Port Adelaide.

On 14 December 2016, O'Shea signed with the Northern Blues.

In November 2017, O’Shea was drafted by the Carlton Football Club in the AFL pre-season draft being the only selection for that year.

He marked his return to the AFL when he debuted in the Round 2 match against the Gold Coast Suns. O’Shea was never able to cement a regular senior position, and was subsequently delisted by Carlton at the conclusion of the 2018 season.
