= Matthew Broadbent =

Australian rules footballer

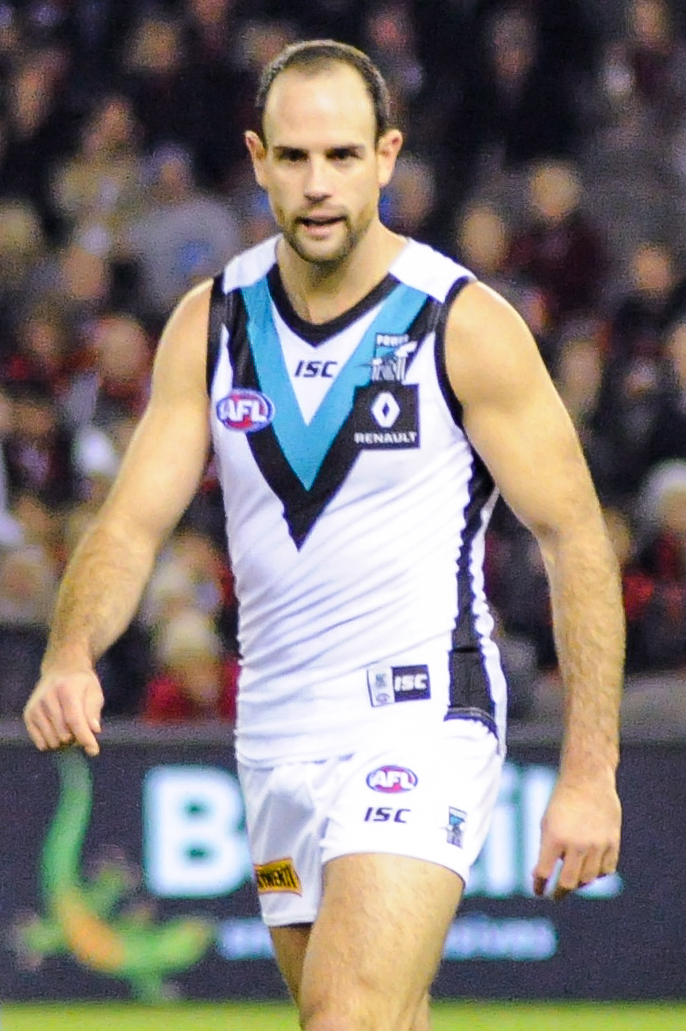
- Broadbent playing for Port Adelaide in June 2017

Personal information
- Full name: Matthew Broadbent
- Born: 1 August 1990 (age 36)
- Original team: Woodville-West Torrens Football Club
- Debut: Round 16, 2009, Port Adelaide vs. West Coast, at AAMI Stadium
- Height: 190 cm (6 ft 3 in)
- Weight: 89 kg (196 lb)
- Position: Midfielder/defender

Playing career^{1}
Years	Club	Games (Goals)
2009–2019	Port Adelaide	171 (52)
- ^{1} Playing statistics correct to the end of 2019.

Matthew Broadbent (born 1 August 1990) is an Australian rules footballer who played for the Port Adelaide Football Club in the Australian Football League (AFL). He was selected with pick 38 in the 2008 AFL draft from the Woodville-West Torrens Football Club in the South Australian National Football League (SANFL). He currently plays for the South Adelaide Football Club in the SANFL.

== AFL career ==
He made his AFL debut in round 16 of the 2009 AFL season against the West Coast Eagles at AAMI Stadium in July 2009.

=== 2010 ===
Broadbent played eleven games in his second season at the club and found his place as a midfield utility in combination with an occasional running defender role. He demonstrated an aptitude to win inside ball and effect contests around the ground as he pushed his way into the side after playing the majority of the first thirteen rounds with his aligned SANFL side Woodville West Torrens. Finishing the season off with nine consecutive games, Broadbent's performance was enough to show promise as a potential future midfielder

=== 2011 ===
Broadbent played in a career high 19 game during 2011 where his offensive, attacking game flourished in a utility role. Through those 19 games he showed promise as a quality player of the future but struggled to consistently find the uncontested football.

=== 2012 ===
In 2012 Broadbent's break out 2012 was unlined by a series of strong performances in the midfield, starting against Fremantle in Round 8 and running through to the mid-season bye. His highlight was setting up the match winning goals against North Melbourne in Round 8, whilst he polled three Brownlow Medal votes for his game against the Gold Coast in Round 9. He finished equal second in the club's John Cahill Medal count.

== SANFL career ==
After Broadbent returned to play in the SANFL in the 2020 season with South Adelaide. In 2021, he represented South Australia in their interstate match against Western Australia, and was awarded the Fos Williams Medal as the best South Australian player.
