= Jay Schulz =

Australian rules footballer (born 1985)

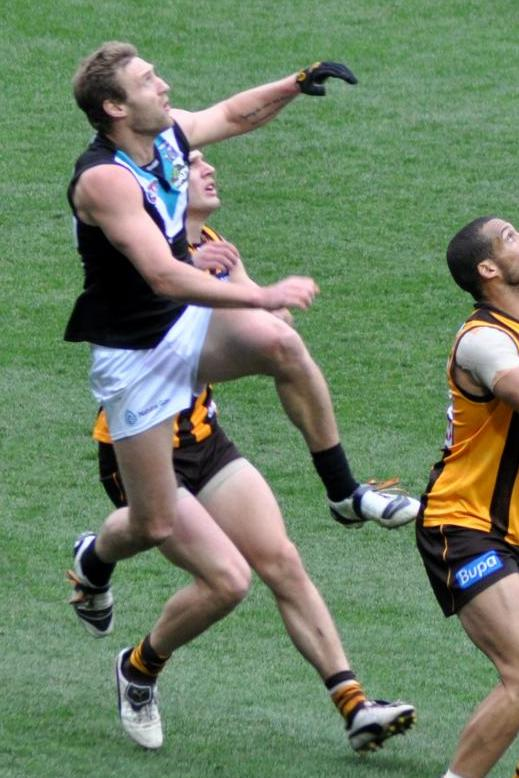
- Schulz (left) with Port Adelaide in 2011

Personal information
- Full name: Jay Schulz
- Born: 18 April 1985 (age 41); South Australia
- Original team: Woodville-West Torrens (SANFL)
- Draft: No. 12, 2002 National Draft
- Height: 193 cm (6 ft 4 in)
- Weight: 94 kg (207 lb)
- Position: Forward

Playing career^{1}
Years	Club	Games (Goals)
2003–2009	Richmond	71 (58)
2010–2016	Port Adelaide	123 (275)
Total		194 (333)
- ^{1} Playing statistics correct to the end of 2016.

Career highlights
- 4× Port Adelaide leading goalkicker: (2010, 2012, 2013, 2014); 2004 AFL Rising Star: nominee

Jay Schulz (born 18 April 1985) is a former professional Australian rules footballer who played for the Port Adelaide Football Club in the Australian Football League from 2010 to 2016. A high marking forward, he previously played for Richmond from 2003 to 2009.

== Early life and career ==
Schulz attended Concordia College in Highgate, South Australia and played football for his high school as well as the Central Yorke Cougars Football Club.

As a 17-year-old, Schulz played for the All-Australian under-17 side against Ireland in the International Rules series. He won the Ron Barassi Medal as best player for Australia during the series.

Schulz was drafted in the 2002 National AFL Draft, No. 12 overall, and then traded by Adelaide with Kane Johnson and pick 28 to Richmond for Jason Torney, pick 2, 18 and 32.

== AFL career ==
=== Richmond: 2003–2009 ===
Schulz made his debut in 2003 against Essendon, but only saw two minutes of action. Schulz had a promising start to his career at Richmond, including a 6-goal game against the Brisbane Lions in 2004, that earned him an AFL Rising Star nomination.

2005 was a year to forget for Schulz after breaking his ankle twice. He started the year being caught drink driving and speeding, that resulted in Richmond’s major sponsor, the TAC withdrawing their sponsorship of the club. He would only play 4 games for the season. After playing the first two games of the season in 2006, he hurt his shoulder and missed a few months. He returned in Round 13 and kicked 3 goals against Collingwood. He had a career high 8 tackles against the Western Bulldogs a few games later. Schulz kicked 16 goals in the last 9 games of the season. He was used in a variety of positions, highlighting his ability to play multiple roles. However, he will be looking to cement a permanent spot, either forward or back, to give some stability to the Tigers structure. Schulz started the 2007 season very well, kicking 9 goals in the first 4 games. However, he couldn't hold his spot for the entire season. He finished the year with 14.14 from 12 games.

Schulz was also on the verge of being traded to then Grand Finalist, Port Adelaide in a bid to return to his home state, and to start afresh his football career, however Richmond rejected the offer from the club, and opted to retain Schulz on the list as there was still time on his contract.

After being close to leaving Richmond during the Trade Week in 2007, Schulz had his most consistent season at Richmond in 2008. He played mainly at centre half back and also went forward to pinch hit. Schulz started the season well and even lead the Richmond Best & Fairest after the first few rounds. He had a career high 29 disposals and 17 marks in round 20 against Hawthorn. At the end of the 2008 season, Schulz signed on with the Tigers for a further two years. He had a disappointing 2009 due to injury and average form. He played in both the backline and forward line, kicking 3 goals in 4 matches.

=== Port Adelaide: 2010–2016 ===
On 8 October 2009, shortly after Damien Hardwick was appointed coach of Richmond, Schulz was traded to the Port Adelaide Football Club in exchange for Mitchell Farmer. Once he arrived at Alberton, he was given the number 28 guernsey previously held by Toby Thurstans.

He made his Port debut in round 1 against North Melbourne and showed his hardness at the ball by going off the field twice with the blood rule (Port went on to win easily). He laid 6 tackles for the game and many lead to goals for the Power. Schulz played the first 3 games of the 2010 season in the forward lines and displayed good goal sense and defensive pressure. He kicked 3.3 in those three games but was ruled out of the Round 4 clash against Geelong after a minor knee injury. He returned to the team in Round 5 and contributed up forward, kicking 2.1 against top-placed St Kilda, and then a goal in a quiet game in the Showdown the following week. He was omitted from the Port Adelaide team for the round 7 match against Essendon in Melbourne. Schulz played his best game in Round 13 against North Melbourne, kicking 7 goals. Schulz's seven-goal haul was the equal second highest for the Power and one shy of the club record held by former captain Warren Tredrea. In round 18, Schulz took 6 contested marks and kicked 4 goals to help Port Adelaide win by 8 points over Hawthorn. In Round 21, he kicked 5 goals making him the leading goal-kicker for Port Adelaide with 33 goals. He finished top 10 in the John Cahill Medal. He also got 5 votes in the Brownlow Medal.

He was voted into the Leadership group for the 2011 season. Schulz suffered a serious knee injury during the round 1 clash against Collingwood. He twisted his right knee in a clinch with Magpie Luke Ball on the city wing of the ground early in the game. He returned to action in round 7 against the Hawks. Schulz equalled his career best of 7 goals in round 15 against the Brisbane Lions. He finished the season on 31 goals, just one goal short of being the leading goal kicker, for the second year in a row.

In 2013, Port Adelaide made the finals for the first time since 2007. They finished the season with a 12-10 win–loss record in his best season in his career, booting a high 49 goals throughout it and becoming a three time Port Adelaide leading goal kicker. He regularly kicked more than two goals a game. In his first final against Collingwood, Schulz kicked three goals and got his team over the line by 24 points. Port Adelaide then advanced to a semi-final against Geelong. He also worked up the ground a lot in 2013, which got the eye of commentators and had him improving his game by collecting more disposals and making him more noticed by Port Adelaide fans. It also helped him achieve his best season in his 11-season history.

In round 14, 2014, Schulz kicked a career high eight goals against the Western Bulldogs which ties the record with Warren Tredrea for most goals kicked in a single game by a Port Adelaide player. He would also kick bags of seven and six twice. Schulz finished the year second in the Coleman Medal.

Schulz's 2015 season was solid rather than spectacular. His goal tally was down to 44 and there were numerous games he struggled to influence. However, he still finished second for goals at the club. His strongest patch of form was from rounds three to five when he kicked four, five and five goals in successive weeks, all being important contributions to close wins.

In August 2016, Port Adelaide announced they would not renew Schulz's contract for 2017.

== Kicking technique ==
Jay Schulz best games
Year	Goals	Behinds	%
2014, Rd 14	8	2	80.0
2012, Rd 8	7	0	100.0
2014, Rd 4	7	1	87.5
2011, Rd 15	7	3	70.0
2014, Rd 7	6	0	100.0

Jay Schulz was noted for his goal kicking accuracy. He has disclosed that a lot of his success at goal kicking came from having a very detailed, step-by-step identical goal-kicking routine for every set shot.

== Personal life ==
In March 2023, Schulz, alongside former AFL player Darren Jarman and the family of former AFL player Shane Tuck, launched a class action lawsuit in the Supreme Court of Victoria against the AFL and the Richmond, Port Adelaide, Hawthorn and Adelaide football clubs, with the plaintiffs alleging that the defendants failed to ensure proper concussion management during the plaintiffs' playing careers.

Jay now runs a kicking academy and enjoys life back in Adelaide with his wife Laura.
