= Paddy Ryder =

Australian rules footballer

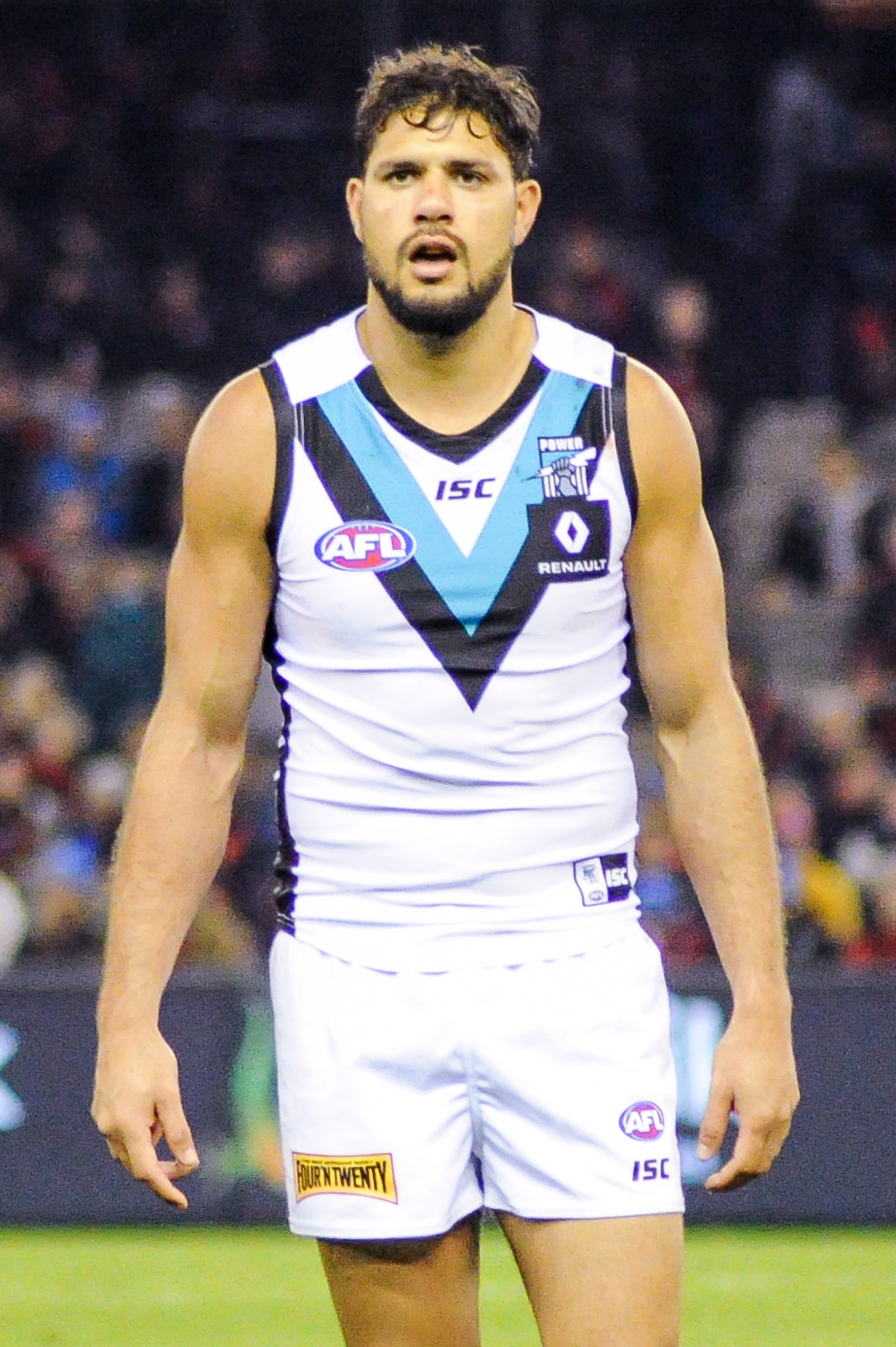
- Ryder playing for Port Adelaide in June 2017

Personal information
- Full name: Patrick Ryder
- Born: 14 March 1988 (age 38)
- Original team: East Fremantle (WAFL)
- Draft: No. 7, 2005 national draft
- Debut: 1 April 2006, Essendon vs. Sydney, at Docklands Stadium
- Height: 197 cm (6 ft 6 in)
- Weight: 94 kg (207 lb)
- Position: Ruckman

Club information
- Current club: St Kilda
- Number: 18

Playing career^{1}
Years	Club	Games (Goals)
2006–2014	Essendon	170 (117)
2015–2019	Port Adelaide	73 (54)
2020–2022	St Kilda	38 (26)
Total		281 (197)
- ^{1} Playing statistics correct to the end of 2022.

Career highlights
- John Cahill Medal: 2017; All-Australian team: 2017; AFL Anzac Day Medal: 2009; 2007 AFL Rising Star: nominee

Patrick Ryder (born 14 March 1988) is a former Australian rules footballer who played for the Essendon, Port Adelaide and St Kilda Football Clubs in the Australian Football League (AFL). Ryder was noted for his speed, agility and leap for someone of his size and it was these attributes that had his first AFL coach in Kevin Sheedy comparing him to Indigenous Australian rules football star Graham "Polly" Farmer. Ryder's father, Revis Ryder, played football for East Fremantle.

== Early life ==
Ryder is of Noongar heritage and was raised in Geraldton, Western Australia. He began playing junior football with the Rover Football Club at Greenough Oval.

Ryder was part of the AFL under-18 All-Australian team and represented Australia in the under-18 international rules in Ireland. Prior to being drafted, he played in the West Australian Football League (WAFL), playing for the East Fremantle Football Club.

== AFL career ==
=== Essendon (2006–2014) ===
Essendon secured Ryder with its first selection in the 2005 AFL draft, which was the seventh pick in the league.

He made his debut in round 1, 2006, against Sydney, playing in the ruck and receiving his first AFL career possession after he caught Swans premiership player Amon Buchanan holding the ball and won a free kick. In a memorable debut, the Bombers thrashed the 2005 premiers by 27 points, in what would be their only win inside the first 16 rounds of the season and the only win Ryder enjoyed that year.

Ryder was awarded a NAB Rising Star nomination for his efforts in round 1, 2007. He won the Anzac Medal in 2009 after teammate David Hille was injured in the opening minutes of the game, resulting in Ryder rucking unassisted for the rest of the game.

Ryder played his 100th AFL game in round 6, 2011, in a match where Essendon defeated the Gold Coast Suns by 139 points.

Ryder's improved form in the second half of the 2013 season after struggling with poor output and low confidence saw him play a big role in Essendon’s push to the finals. He played mainly in the ruck, where his tap-work was crucial, and also played forward and in defence.

Ryder remained a vital part of the Essendon outfit, firstly as a ruckman and then as an option as he pushed forward with his pace and high-marking ability. Ryder had a solid start to 2014, including a two-goal performance in round 9 against Sydney.

=== Port Adelaide (2015–2019) ===
At the end of the 2014 season, Ryder left Essendon following the supplements saga. Ryder and his wife Jess were concerned for the health of their unborn child after he was allegedly told of the potential risks of the supplements program when interviewed by ASADA. Of the concern, Ryder stated that "At first we were really scared (about Harlan). What has panned out over a long period of time is that we felt badly let down by the club and lost trust and faith.” He nominated Port Adelaide as his preferred club of destination. Essendon were unwilling to trade Ryder initially, with Ryder and his management suggesting they would take Essendon to the AFL Grievance Tribunal because of the club's breach of its duty of care to players during the scandal. Ryder's manager also suggested that Ryder would consider retirement over returning to Essendon if a trade was blocked by the club. On 16 October, he was traded to the Power.

Being Port Adelaide's big name recruit for season 2015, Ryder was unable to take part in the pre-season trial matches and was only cleared from his provisional suspension a few days prior to the round one game against Fremantle due to the ASADA drugs investigation. He played in 18 games for the Power, which included games where he kicked three goals in both showdowns and a four goals against his former club Essendon.

Ryder, along with 33 other past and present Essendon players, was found guilty of using a banned performance enhancing substance, thymosin beta-4, as part of Essendon's sports supplements program during the 2012 season. He and his team-mates were initially found not guilty in March 2015 by the AFL Anti-Doping Tribunal, but a guilty verdict was returned in January 2016 after an appeal by the World Anti-Doping Agency. He was suspended for two years which, with backdating, ended in November 2016; as a result, he served approximately 14 months of his suspension and missed the entire 2016 AFL season.

In the 2017 season, Ryder returned from suspension and became one of the best ruckmen in the league. He played his 200th AFL game in round 14, in which Port Adelaide defeated Collingwood by 31 points at the MCG. Eventually, he was named an All Australian ruckman and John Cahill Medalist as a best and fairest player for the club.

=== St Kilda (2020–2022) ===
At the conclusion of the 2019 AFL season, Ryder requested a trade to St Kilda. The trade was finalised on 15 October and Ryder was traded to St Kilda along with Port Adelaide teammate Dougal Howard and pick 10 and a 2020 fourth-round selection, in return for the Saints' picks 12 and 18 and a 2020 third-round selection. Ryder nominated to join St Kilda ahead of his former club Essendon. He chose to leave Port Adelaide due to a perceived lack of opportunity in the ruck division at the Power. Of the move, Ryder stated that "I guess the way things have panned out at Port Adelaide over the past couple of years is Port Adelaide’s brought in Scotty Lycett, who's a terrific ruckman, and they've got a couple of young blokes on the list that probably need a bit more time to develop. And I guess being my age and stuff I’m taking away that opportunity for them, so I'm very understanding of the football club and respect their decision. But I feel like I've still got a lot more to give, so I'll be going down to Moorabbin." On choosing to join the Saints ahead of his former team, Ryder admitted that he was leaning towards rejoining the Bombers until he toured their facilities; "I just didn't get like a really, really good feeling from going back there", said Ryder in October 2019. "But then I went down to Moorabbin and it was a sense of like excitement and in the end thats what I ended up basing my decision on."

Ryder played 14 of a possible 19 games for the Saints in the 2020 season. He also played a significant role in the winning elimination final against Western Bulldogs, but an injury sustained in the game ended his season.

It was announced in early March 2021 that Ryder would temporarily step away from the club to spend time with his family and elders. Ryder received the full support of the club. Ryder returned to the club in April and played his first game for the season in the round seven win over Hawthorn in which he gathered five tackles, three clearances and 36 hitouts (significantly above the AFL average). Ryder had a purple patch in rounds 10-12, collecting 41, 34 and 34 hitouts in three games. Ryder also had a solid game in round 16 against Collingwood and champion Brodie Grundy, collecting 23 hitouts and kicking two goals. Ryder's last game for 2021 was Round 19, after which he battled an achilles injury which saw him miss the remainder of the season. After playing 12 of a possible 22 games and averaging over 30 hitouts a game, Ryder re-signed with the Saints for another season.

After another injury-interrupted year for St Kilda during the side's 2022 season, Ryder announced his retirement on 20 August, ending a career of 281 games across three clubs.

== Post-playing career ==
Following his retirement, Ryder announced his return to Essendon Football Club for the first time since his departure following the 2014 season. Ryder will be the club's Indigenous Player Development Manager. Some of the players Ryder will work with include 2 sons of former teammate Alwyn Davey. Ryder had previously left the club following the supplements saga.

== Statistics ==
Statistics are correct to the end of the 2021 season

Legend
G	Goals	K	Kicks	D	Disposals	T	Tackles
B	Behinds	H	Handballs	M	Marks	H/O	Hit-outs

Season	Team	No.	Games	Totals								Averages (per game)							
Season	Team	No.	Games	G	B	K	H	D	M	T	H/O	G	B	K	H	D	M	T	H/O
2006	Essendon	30	9	2	2	28	19	47	14	10	39	0.2	0.2	3.1	2.1	5.2	1.6	1.1	4.3
2007	Essendon	30	21	3	1	114	106	220	99	49	57	0.1	0.0	5.4	5.0	10.5	4.7	2.3	2.7
2008	Essendon	30	22	5	4	119	103	222	90	47	51	0.2	0.2	5.4	4.7	10.1	4.1	2.1	2.3
2009	Essendon	30	21	12	9	121	141	262	72	99	424	0.6	0.4	5.8	6.7	12.5	3.4	4.7	20.2
2010	Essendon	30	21	21	12	139	113	252	87	94	416	1.0	0.6	6.6	5.4	12.0	4.1	4.5	19.8
2011	Essendon	30	23	27	15	175	118	293	111	66	329	1.2	0.7	7.6	5.1	12.7	4.8	2.9	14.3
2012	Essendon	30	15	17	10	123	81	204	89	38	329	1.1	0.7	8.2	5.4	13.6	5.9	2.5	21.9
2013	Essendon	30	17	10	3	136	84	220	67	55	388	0.6	0.2	8.0	4.9	12.9	3.9	3.2	22.8
2014	Essendon	30	21	20	16	164	107	271	85	56	549	1.0	0.8	7.8	5.1	12.9	4.0	2.7	26.1
2015	Port Adelaide	4	18	18	12	109	101	210	68	36	412	1.0	0.7	6.1	5.6	11.7	3.8	2.0	22.9
2016	Port Adelaide	4	0	—	—	—	—	—	—	—	—	—	—	—	—	—	—	—	—
2017	Port Adelaide	4	22	11	8	170	108	278	71	63	831	0.5	0.4	7.7	4.9	12.6	3.2	2.9	37.8
2018	Port Adelaide	4	16	10	4	81	74	155	49	38	489	0.6	0.3	5.1	4.6	9.7	3.1	2.4	30.6
2019	Port Adelaide	4	17	15	12	105	61	166	48	40	381	0.9	0.7	6.2	3.6	9.8	2.8	2.4	22.4
2020 (Note: The 2020 season was played with 17 home-and-away matches per team (down from 22) and 16-minute quarters with time on (down from 20-minute quarters with time on) due to the impact of the COVID-19 pandemic.)	St Kilda	18	14	10	2	79	34	113	29	35	293	0.7	0.1	5.6	2.4	8.1	2.1	2.5	20.9
2021	St Kilda	18	12	5	1	82	36	118	37	30	361	0.4	0.1	6.8	3.0	9.8	3.1	2.5	30.2
Career			269	186	111	1745	1286	3031	1016	756	5350	0.7	0.4	6.5	4.8	11.3	3.8	2.8	19.9
