= List of AFL debuts in 2013 =

During the 2013 Australian Football League (AFL) season a number of Australian rules footballers made their AFL debut with others playing their first game for a new club.

== Summary ==
Summary of debuts in 2013
Club	AFL debuts	Change of club
Adelaide	4	0
Brisbane Lions	5	2
Carlton	5	0
Collingwood	8	4
Essendon	4	1
Fremantle	7	1
Geelong	3	2
Gold Coast	5	2
Greater Western Sydney	8	2
Hawthorn	5	3
Melbourne	7	5
North Melbourne	3	2
Port Adelaide	4	4
Richmond	3	6
St Kilda	9	3
Sydney	6	1
West Coast	5	3
Western Bulldogs	5	3
Total	96	44

== AFL debuts ==
Name	Club	Age at debut	Debut round	Games (in 2013)	Goals (in 2013)	Notes
Nick Kommer	Essendon	22 years, 175 days	1	19	10	
Brett Goodes	Western Bulldogs	29 years, 42 days	1	13	2	Brother of Adam Goodes.
Lachie Plowman	Greater Western Sydney	18 years, 200 days	1	6	1	
Lachie Whitfield	Greater Western Sydney	18 years, 255 days	1	19	8	2012 Larke Medal winner, 1st overall selection in 2012 AFL draft, round 10 nomination 2013 AFL Rising Star.
Dane Rampe	Sydney	22 years, 301 days	1	23	1	
Jaeger O'Meara	Gold Coast	19 years, 36 days	1	22	16	Round 5 nomination 2013 AFL Rising Star and overall winner.
Matt Jones	Melbourne	25 years, 164 days	1	22	3	Grandson of Trevor Jones.
Jimmy Toumpas	Melbourne	19 years, 89 days	1	14	0	
Jack Viney	Melbourne	18 years, 352 days	1	13	3	son of Todd Viney, round 21 nomination 2013 AFL Rising Star.
Kane Mitchell	Port Adelaide	23 years, 120 days	1	13	8	2012 Sandover Medal winner.
Jake Neade	Port Adelaide	18 years, 306 days	1	16	11	2012 Harrison Medal winner, round 13 nomination 2013 AFL Rising Star.
Ollie Wines	Port Adelaide	18 years, 175 days	1	24	8	Round 1 nomination 2013 AFL Rising Star.
Sam Dwyer	Collingwood	26 years, 214 days	1	21	15	
Jack Frost	Collingwood	21 days, 35 days	1	2	0	Brother of Sam Frost.
Josh Thomas	Collingwood	21 years, 181 days	1	19	11	
Jed Anderson	Hawthorn	19 years, 59 days	1	6	3	Brother of Joe Anderson, round 3 nomination 2013 AFL Rising Star.
Mark Blicavs	Geelong	22 years, 5 days	1	22	7	
Brad Crouch	Adelaide	19 years, 83 days	2	14	4	Round 14 nomination 2013 AFL Rising Star.
Dean Terlich	Melbourne	23 years, 114 days	2	20	0	
Sam Rowe	Carlton	25 years, 139 days	2	10	9	
Callum Sinclair	West Coast	23 years, 196 days	2	5	3	Son of Allan Sinclair.
Nathan Wright	St Kilda	19 years, 57 days	3	8	0	
Tom Lee	St Kilda	22 years, 102 days	3	10	17	
Dylan Buckley	Carlton	20 years, 29 days	3	1	1	Son of Jim Buckley, round 2 nomination2014 AFL Rising Star
Sam Mayes	Brisbane Lions	18 years, 328 days	3	18	12	Round 12 nomination 2013 AFL Rising Star.
Taylor Duryea	Hawthorn	21 years, 355 days	3	18	0	
Tanner Smith	Fremantle	19 years, 44 days	4	1	0	
Rory Laird	Adelaide	19 years, 113 days	4	18	1	Round 20 nomination 2013 AFL Rising Star.
Jackson Macrae	Western Bulldogs	18 years, 261 days	4	13	3	Round 8 nomination 2013 AFL Rising Star.
Jake Stringer	Western Bulldogs	18 years, 361 days	4	10	12	Round 20 nomination 2014 AFL Rising Star.
Majak Daw	North Melbourne	22 years, 42 days	4	6	9	
Sam Docherty	Brisbane Lions	19 years, 186 days	4	13	1	
Marco Paparone	Brisbane Lions	18 years, 230 days	4	5	5	
Brodie Murdoch	St Kilda	19 years, 95 days	5	8	2	Brother of Jordan Murdoch.
Josh Saunders	St Kilda	18 years, 237 days	5	10	2	
Jack Hannath	Fremantle	21 years, 291 days	5	12	7	
Nick Vlastuin	Richmond	19 years, 7 days	5	18	9	Round 7 nomination 2013 AFL Rising Star.
Zac Williams	Greater Western Sydney	18 years, 219 days	5	11	2	Round 19 nomination 2013 AFL Rising Star.
Justin Clarke	Brisbane Lions	19 years, 161 days	5	14	0	
Jarrod Witts	Collingwood	20 years, 232 days	6	7	5	
Ben Kennedy	Collingwood	19 years, 62 days	6	12	9	
Aidan Corr	Greater Western Sydney	18 years, 352 days	6	10	1	
Will Sierakowski	North Melbourne	22 years, 282 days	6	7	1	Previously recruited by Hawthorn, nephew of Brian Sierakowski and cousin of David Sierakowski.
Jesse Lonergan	Gold Coast	18 years, 171 days	6	4	0	Nephew of Sam Lonergan.
Jed Lamb	Sydney	20 years, 198 days	6	12	9	
Jaryd Cachia	Carlton	21 years, 362 days	6	14	1	
Dean Kent	Melbourne	19 years, 71 days	6	15	10	
Jackson Thurlow	Geelong	19 years, 44 days	7	4	1	Round 19 nomination 2015 AFL Rising Star.
Sam Colquhoun	Port Adelaide	18 years, 142 days	7	10	2	
Mark Hutchings	West Coast	21 years, 351 days	7	9	1	
Jimmy Webster	St Kilda	19 years, 319 days	7	11	1	
Troy Menzel	Carlton	18 years, 239 days	8	7	8	Brother of Daniel Menzel, round 16 nomination 2014 AFL Rising Star.
George Burbury	Geelong	20 years, 343 days	9	2	2	
Nathan Hrovat	Western Bulldogs	18 years, 352 days	9	7	1	Round 17 nomination 2014 AFL Rising Star.
Sam Michael	Brisbane Lions	19 years, 342 days	9	3	0	
Sam Grimley	Hawthorn	22 years, 144 days	9	3	3	Son of Brett Grimley, grandson of Ken Grimley.
Kyle Martin	Collingwood	22 years, 256 days	10	4	6	
Will Hams	Essendon	18 years, 322 days	10	2	0	
Tom Mitchell	Sydney	20 years, 2 days	10	14	11	Son of Barry Mitchell, round 11 nomination 2013 AFL Rising Star.
Tim Sumner	Gold Coast	18 years, 235 days	10	11	6	Brother of Byron Sumner.
Jackson Ferguson	St Kilda	20 years, 222 days	10	1	0	
Joe Daniher	Essendon	19 years, 96 days	11	5	3	Son of Anthony Daniher, brother of Darcy Daniher, round 12 nomination 2014 AFL Rising Star.
Brandon Jack	Sydney	19 years, 15 days	11	9	7	Brother of Kieren Jack, son of Garry Jack.
Blayne Wilson	West Coast	21 years, 135 days	11	7	0	
Adam Oxley	Collingwood	20 years, 221 days	11	2	0	
Mitch Clisby	Melbourne	23 years, 169 days	13	8	1	
Lachie Hunter	Western Bulldogs	18 years, 191 days	13	9	4	Son of Mark Hunter.
Matt Taberner	Fremantle	20 years, 6 days	13	4	0	Round 22 nomination 2014 AFL Rising Star.
Simon Tunbridge	West Coast	20 years, 88 days	14	2	2	
Xavier Richards	Sydney	20 years, 65 days	14	1	0	Brother of Ted Richards.
Andrew Boston	Gold Coast	19 years, 99 days	14	8	7	
Viv Michie	Fremantle	21 years, 127 days	14	1	0	
Jonathon Ceglar	Hawthorn	22 years, 137 days	14	2	1	Previously recruited by Collingwood.
Matthew Arnot	Richmond	19 years, 252 days	14	4	1	
Jonathan O'Rourke	Greater Western Sydney	19 years, 85 days	16	1	0	
Adam Carter	West Coast	19 years, 89 days	16	5	0	
Will Langford	Hawthorn	21 years, 17 days	17	1	0	Son of Chris Langford.
Tom Curren	St Kilda	20 years, 356 days	17	7	3	
Mitch Grigg	Adelaide	20 years, 201 days	17	5	6	
Brodie Grundy	Collingwood	19 years, 104 days	18	7	1	Round 22 nomination 2013 AFL Rising Star.
Kyle Hartigan	Adelaide	21 years, 262 days	18	3	0	
Darren Minchington	St Kilda	19 years, 243 days	20	2	2	
Troy Davis	Melbourne	21 years, 61 days	20	2	1	
Tom Downie	Greater Western Sydney	20 years, 107 days	20	1	0	
Taylor Garner	North Melbourne	19 years, 216 days	20	2	0	
Nick Graham	Carlton	19 years, 67 days	21	2	0	
Matthew McDonough	Richmond	19 years, 204 days	21	1	0	
Lauchlan Dalgleish	Essendon	20 years, 57 days	21	3	1	
Cameron Shenton	St Kilda	22 years, 332 days	22	1	0	
Leigh Osborne	Gold Coast	23 years, 166 days	22	1	0	
Kristian Jaksch	Greater Western Sydney	18 years, 322 days	22	2	1	
Shane Biggs	Sydney	22 years, 25 days	23	3	0	
Josh Simpson	Fremantle	19 years, 204 days	23	1	1	
Alex Forster	Fremantle	20 years, 49 days	23	1	0	
Craig Moller	Fremantle	19 years, 9 days	23	1	0	
James Stewart	Greater Western Sydney	19 years, 182 days	23	1	0	Son of Craig Stewart.

== Change of AFL club ==
Name	Club	Age at debut	Debut round	Games (in 2013)	Goals (in 2013)	Notes
Brendon Goddard	Essendon	27 years, 306 days	1	22	18	Previously played for St Kilda, Restricted free agent recruit, 2012, won 2013 W. S. Crichton Medal
Danyle Pearce	Fremantle	26 years, 350 days	1	25	10	Previously played for Port Adelaide, Restricted free agent recruit, 2012, played in 2013 AFL Grand Final
Jamie Cripps	West Coast	20 years, 334 days	1	15	12	Previously played for St Kilda, Trade, 2012
Troy Chaplin	Richmond	27 years, 24 days	1	22	1	Previously played for Port Adelaide, Restricted free agent recruit, 2012
Tom Young	Western Bulldogs	20 years, 338 days	1	15	2	Previously played for Collingwood, Trade, 2012
Koby Stevens	Western Bulldogs	21 years, 285 days	1	19	9	Previously played for West Coast, Trade, 2012
Nick Lower	Western Bulldogs	25 years, 280 days	1	13	2	Previously played for Port Adelaide & Fremantle, Delisted free agent recruit, 2012, Delisted at end of season
Brent Moloney	Brisbane Lions	29 years, 62 days	1	16	8	Previously played for Melbourne, Trade, 2012
Stefan Martin	Brisbane Lions	26 years, 133 days	1	5	4	Previously played for Melbourne, Trade, 2012
Stephen Gilham	Greater Western Sydney	28 years, 209 days	1	14	0	Previously played for Hawthorn, Trade, 2012
Greg Broughton	Gold Coast	26 years, 182 days	1	17	2	Previously played for Fremantle, Trade, 2012
Tom Murphy	Gold Coast	27 years, 11 days	1	17	0	Previously played for Hawthorn, Unrestricted free agent recruit, 2012
Tom Hickey	St Kilda	22 years, 24 days	1	12	2	Previously played for Gold Coast, Trade, 2012
Dylan Roberton	St Kilda	21 years, 282 days	1	20	2	Previously played for Fremantle, Delisted free agent recruit, 2012
Shannon Byrnes	Melbourne	28 years, 358 days	1	17	12	Previously played for Geelong, Unrestricted free agent recruit, 2012
Tom Gillies	Melbourne	23 years, 24 days	1	2	0	Previously played for Geelong, Delisted free agent recruit, 2012, Delisted at end of season
Cameron Pedersen	Melbourne	26 years, 14 days	1	10	5	Previously played for North Melbourne, Trade, 2012
David Rodan	Melbourne	29 years, 174 days	1	9	2	Previously played for Richmond & Port Adelaide, Trade, 2012, Retired after knee injury in Round 22
Campbell Heath	Port Adelaide	21 years, 364 days	1	12	3	Previously played for Sydney, Trade, 2012
Angus Monfries	Port Adelaide	26 years, 72 days	1	24	39	Previously played for Essendon, Trade, 2012
Lewis Stevenson	Port Adelaide	23 years, 244 days	1	9	0	Previously played for West Coast, Trade, 2012
Ben Jacobs	North Melbourne	21 years, 82 days	1	7	2	Previously played for Port Adelaide, 2012 National Draft
Quinten Lynch	Collingwood	30 years, 67 days	1	18	9	Previously played for West Coast, Unrestricted free agent recruit, 2012
Jordan Russell	Collingwood	26 years, 145 days	1	9	0	Previously played for Carlton, Trade, 2012, Delisted at end of season
Jared Rivers	Geelong	28 years, 165 days	1	10	0	Previously played for Melbourne, Unrestricted free agent recruit, 2012
Josh Caddy	Geelong	20 years, 185 days	1	18	11	Previously played for Gold Coast, Trade, 2012
Ricky Petterd	Richmond	24 years, 255 days	2	12	4	Previously played for Melbourne, 2013 Rookie Draft
Taylor Hine	North Melbourne	21 years, 80 days	3	14	0	Previously played for Gold Coast, 2012 National Draft
Chris Knights	Richmond	26 years, 201 days	3	5	6	Previously played for Adelaide, Unrestricted free agent recruit, 2012
Ben Hudson	Collingwood	34 years, 50 days	3	7	1	Previously played for Adelaide, Western Bulldogs & Brisbane Lions, 2013 Rookie Draft
Bret Thornton	Greater Western Sydney	29 years, 163 days	5	1	0	Previously played for Carlton, 2013 Pre-season Draft, Delisted at end of season
Brian Lake	Hawthorn	31 years, 61 days	5	21	2	Previously played for Western Bulldogs, Trade, 2012, Won Norm Smith Medal in 2013 AFL Grand Final
Jonathan Simpkin	Hawthorn	25 years, 188 days	6	14	6	Previously played for Geelong, Delisted free agent recruit, 2012, Played in 2013 AFL Grand Final
Sharrod Wellingham	West Coast	24 years, 302 days	6	10	8	Previously played for Collingwood, Trade, 2012
Orren Stephenson	Richmond	30 years, 300 days	7	6	0	Previously played for Geelong, 2013 Rookie Draft
Chris Dawes	Melbourne	24 years, 361 days	7	12	12	Previously played for Collingwood, Trade, 2012
Matthew Spangher	Hawthorn	26 years, 26 days	8	4	2	Previously played for West Coast & Sydney, Trade, 2012
Sam Lonergan	Richmond	26 years, 61 days	9	2	0	Previously played for Essendon, 2013 Rookie Draft
Jack Hombsch	Port Adelaide	20 years, 87 days	10	6	0	Previously played for Greater Western Sydney, Trade, 2012
Aaron Edwards	Richmond	29 years, 93 days	10	9	14	Previously played for West Coast & North Melbourne, Trade, 2012
Kurt Tippett	Sydney	26 years, 46 days	13	12	35	Previously played for Adelaide, 2013 Pre-season Draft, Sydney leading goalkicker in 2013
Clinton Young	Collingwood	27 years, 140 days	15	2	0	Previously played for Hawthorn, Unrestricted free agent recruit, 2012
Cale Morton	West Coast	23 years, 178 days	16	3	1	Previously played for Melbourne, Trade, 2012
