= 2012 AFL draft =

Draft for the Australian Football League

General information
- Dates: 22 November 2012; 11 December 2012
- Location: Gold Coast Convention Centre, Gold Coast, Queensland
- Network: Fox Footy
- Sponsored by: National Australia Bank

Overview
- League: AFL
- First selection: Lachie Whitfield (Greater Western Sydney)

The 2012 AFL draft consisted of five opportunities for player acquisitions during the 2012/13 Australian Football League off-season.

These were:

- 2012 trade period; which was held between 1 October and 26 October, and for the first time incorporated a free agency eligibility period.
- A mini-draft of 17-year-old players, as part of the recruitment concessions given to the newly established Greater Western Sydney Giants, held on 26 October
- The 2012 national draft; which was conducted on 22 November at the Gold Coast Convention Centre.
- The 2013 pre-season draft which was held on 11 December 2012 and
- The 2013 rookie draft, also held on 11 December 2012.

== Player movements ==
Of the players not yet eligible for free agency, Kurt Tippett from Adelaide, Sharrod Wellingham and Chris Dawes from Collingwood were the highest profile players who were linked to trade discussions. Geelong have reached an agreement with Gold Coast regarding Josh Caddy, which would involve Geelong's mid-first-round compensation pick, for losing Gary Ablett Jr. to the Suns and other picks to be confirmed, with paperwork for this trade to be lodged to the AFL at a later date.

=== Free agency ===
During the 2012 AFL season, in the leadup to the first ever free agency trade period, there was speculation about high-profile players who had contracts that expired at the end of the season, including Travis Cloke, Travis Boak, Brendon Goddard and Troy Chaplin. However, during the season, Cloke and Boak both re-signed with their current clubs. Brent Moloney from Melbourne became the first player to announce that he would become a free agent He was followed by Carlton pair Bret Thornton and Jordan Russell, West Coast's Quinten Lynch and Port Adelaide's Steven Salopek to declare themselves as free agents.

The initial list of free agents, published in March 2012, consisted of 62 unrestricted free agents and 19 restricted free agents. A restricted free agent is a player who has served eight or more seasons of AFL football at one club, is one of the top 25 per cent highest-paid players at his club, and is now out of contract for the first time since reaching eight seasons of service. Unrestricted free agents are players who have been delisted by their club, played more than ten seasons at one AFL club or has played eight or more seasons at one club and is not one of the top 25 per cent highest-paid players at his club. Restricted free agents must allow their current club to match any offer from a rival club, whereas unrestricted free agents are free to sign with any other club.

The final free agents list issued on 27 September in the week before the trade period commenced consisted of 28 unrestricted free agents and six restricted free agents, reflecting the number of players that had either re-signed with their current club or retired from the AFL.

2012 AFL free agency period signings
Player	Date	Free agent type	Former club	New club	Compensation	Ref
Danyle Pearce	1 October 2012	Restricted	Port Adelaide	Fremantle	2nd round	Ref
Brendon Goddard	1 October 2012	Restricted	St Kilda	Essendon	1st round	
Chris Knights	1 October 2012	Unrestricted	Adelaide	Richmond	None	
Troy Chaplin	1 October 2012	Restricted	Port Adelaide	Richmond	2nd round	
Quinten Lynch	2 October 2012	Unrestricted	West Coast	Collingwood	3rd round	
Shannon Byrnes	4 October 2012	Unrestricted	Geelong	Melbourne	None	
Tom Murphy	12 October 2012	Unrestricted	Hawthorn	Gold Coast	None	
Brent Moloney	12 October 2012	Restricted	Melbourne	Brisbane Lions	3rd round	
Jared Rivers	18 October 2012	Unrestricted	Melbourne	Geelong	3rd round	
Clinton Young	19 October 2012	Unrestricted	Hawthorn	Collingwood	3rd round	
Jonathan Simpkin	1 November 2012	Delisted	Geelong	Hawthorn	None	
Tom Gillies	13 November 2012	Delisted	Geelong	Melbourne	None	
Dylan Roberton	30 November 2012	Delisted	Fremantle	St Kilda	None	
Nick Lower	3 December 2012	Delisted	Fremantle	Western Bulldogs	None	

=== Trades ===
Trade #	Player and/or picks traded	Traded from	Traded to	Traded for
1	Draft picks No. 2 and 67; End of first-round (Brennan) compensation pick	Gold Coast	Greater Western Sydney	GWS Mini-draft pick No. 1 End of first-round (Palmer) compensation pick
2	Angus Monfries	Essendon	Port Adelaide	Draft pick No.51
3	Tom Lee (Claremont); Draft picks No. 24 and 45	Greater Western Sydney	St Kilda	Draft pick No. 12
4	Brian Lake; Draft pick No. 27	Western Bulldogs	Hawthorn	Draft picks No. 21 and 43
5	GWS Mini-draft pick No.2; Dominic Barry (North Ballarat); Draft pick No. 20 (Davis compensation selection)	Greater Western Sydney	Melbourne	Draft picks No. 3 and 14 (Scully compensation selection)
6	Sharrod Wellingham	Collingwood	West Coast	Draft pick No. 18
7	Chris Dawes; Draft pick No. 61	Collingwood	Melbourne	Draft picks No. 20 (Davis compensation selection) and 47
8	Hamish McIntosh	North Melbourne	Geelong	Draft pick No. 38
9	Josh Caddy	Gold Coast	Geelong	First-round Compensation pick Draft pick No. 57
10	Angus Graham; Draft pick No. 53 (relinquished)	Richmond	Adelaide	Draft pick No. 42
11	Jack Hombsch; Jake Neade (North Ballarat)	Greater Western Sydney	Port Adelaide	Draft pick No. 28
12	Tom Hickey; Draft picks No. 25 and 46	Gold Coast	St Kilda	Draft picks No. 13, 36 and 55
13	Koby Stevens	West Coast	Western Bulldogs	Draft pick No. 43
14	Greg Broughton; Draft pick No. 58	Fremantle	Gold Coast	Draft pick No. 36
15	Tom Young	Collingwood	Western Bulldogs	Draft pick No. 69
16	David Rodan	Port Adelaide	Melbourne	Draft pick No. 88
17	Jordan Russell	Carlton	Collingwood	Draft pick No. 69
18	Lewis Stevenson	West Coast	Port Adelaide	Draft pick No. 88
19	Campbell Heath; Draft pick No. 82	Sydney	Port Adelaide	Draft pick No. 70
20	Cale Morton	Melbourne	West Coast	Draft pick No. 88 (unused)
21	Aaron Edwards	North Melbourne	Richmond	Draft pick No. 72
22	Jordan Gysberts; Draft pick No. 61	Melbourne	North Melbourne	Cameron Pedersen; Draft pick No. 72
23	Matthew Spangher; Draft pick No. 70	Sydney	Hawthorn	Draft pick No. 64 (Young compensation selection)
24	Stephen Gilham; Draft picks No. 27 and 63	Hawthorn	Greater Western Sydney	Jed Anderson (NT zone selection); Draft picks No. 28 and 66
25	Stefan Martin	Melbourne	Brisbane Lions	Draft picks No. 52 and 71
26	Draft picks No. 41 and 47	Collingwood	North Melbourne	Draft pick No. 38
27	Trent Dennis-Lane	Sydney	St Kilda	Draft pick No. 46
28	Jamie Cripps; Draft pick No. 45	St Kilda	West Coast	Draft picks No. 40 and 43

Note: the numbering of the draft picks in this trades table may be different to the draft picks known at the time of the trade due to adjustments due to either the insertion of compensation draft picks, Adelaide relinquishing their first two selections or clubs exiting the draft before the later rounds.

=== Retirements and delistings ===
Name	Club	Date	Notes
Daniel Connors	Richmond	4 July 2012	Mutually agreed to part ways with club, failed to meet club expectations on multiple occasions
Cameron Bruce	Hawthorn	16 July 2012	Retirement, due to on-going back injury, effective immediately
Brad Green	Melbourne	8 August 2012	Retirement, effective end of season
Brad Miller	Richmond	16 August 2012	Retirement, effective immediately
Kelvin Moore	Richmond	16 August 2012	Retirement, effective immediately
Lindsay Gilbee	Western Bulldogs	20 August 2012	Retirement, effective immediately
Ryan Hargrave	Western Bulldogs	20 August 2012	Retirement, effective immediately
Chris Tarrant	Collingwood	21 August 2012	Retirement
Antoni Grover	Fremantle	28 August 2012	Retirement
Mark McVeigh	Essendon	29 August 2012	Retirement
Josh Fraser	Gold Coast	29 August 2012	Retirement
Andrew Hooper	Western Bulldogs	3 September 2012	Delisted
James Mulligan	Western Bulldogs	3 September 2012	Retirement
Liam Jurrah	Melbourne	3 September 2012	Resignation
Amon Buchanan	Brisbane Lions	3 September 2012	Retirement
Brent Moloney	Melbourne	4 September 2012	Resignation
James McDonald	Greater Western Sydney	5 September 2012	Retirement
Steve Clifton	Greater Western Sydney	5 September 2012	Delisted
Tim Segrave	Greater Western Sydney	5 September 2012	Delisted
Brett Peake	St Kilda	5 September 2012	Delisted
Dean Polo	St Kilda	5 September 2012	Delisted
Sam Crocker	St Kilda	5 September 2012	Delisted
Daniel Archer	St Kilda	5 September 2012	Delisted
Andrew L. Browne	Richmond	7 September 2012	Delisted
Jeromey Webberley	Richmond	7 September 2012	Delisted
Dean MacDonald	Richmond	7 September 2012	Delisted
Addam Maric	Richmond	7 September 2012	Delisted
Gibson Turner	Richmond	7 September 2012	Delisted
Piva Wright	Richmond	7 September 2012	Delisted
Rohan Kerr	Carlton	7 September 2012	Delisted
Nick Heyne	Carlton	7 September 2012	Delisted
Matthew Scarlett	Geelong	9 September 2012	Retirement
John McCarthy	Port Adelaide	9 September 2012	Died
Chance Bateman	Hawthorn	14 September 2012	Retirement
Nathan Djerrkura	Western Bulldogs	15 September 2012	Retirement
Luke Power	Greater Western Sydney	18 September 2012	Retirement
David Wojcinski	Geelong	18 September 2012	Retirement, effective following VFL Grand Final
Jay Van Berlo	Fremantle	18 September 2012	Delisted
Gavin Urquhart	North Melbourne	19 September 2012	Delisted
Malcolm Lynch	North Melbourne	19 September 2012	Delisted
Simon Hogan	Geelong	24 September 2012	Retired
Sam Sheldon	Brisbane Lions	24 September 2012	Delisted
Cheynee Stiller	Brisbane Lions	24 September 2012	Delisted
James Hawksley	Brisbane Lions	24 September 2012	Delisted
Bryce Retzlaff	Brisbane Lions	24 September 2012	Delisted
Josh Dyson	Brisbane Lions	24 September 2012	Delisted
Brad Harvey	Brisbane Lions	24 September 2012	Delisted
Josh Drummond	Brisbane Lions	25 September 2012	Retired
Brad Symes	Adelaide	27 September 2012	Delisted
Tom Swift	West Coast	5 October 2012	Retirement
Mark Seaby	Sydney	8 October 2012	Delisted
Jarred Moore	Sydney	8 October 2012	Delisted
Eugene Kruger	Sydney	8 October 2012	Delisted
Jack Lynch	Sydney	8 October 2012	Delisted
Dylan McNeil	Sydney	8 October 2012	Delisted
Paul Bower	Carlton	9 October 2012	Delisted
Jarrad Boumann	Hawthorn	12 October 2012	Delisted
David Rodan	Port Adelaide	12 October 2012	Delisted
Simon Phillips	Port Adelaide	12 October 2012	Delisted
Mitch Banner	Port Adelaide	12 October 2012	Delisted
Jacob Surjan	Port Adelaide	12 October 2012	Delisted
Ricky Petterd	Melbourne	27 October 2012	Delisted
Matthew Bate	Melbourne	27 October 2012	Delisted
Jamie Bennell	Melbourne	27 October 2012	Delisted
Lucas Cook	Melbourne	27 October 2012	Delisted
Cruize Garlett	North Melbourne	29 October 2012	Delisted
Matt Campbell	North Melbourne	29 October 2012	Delisted
Ben McKinley	North Melbourne	29 October 2012	Delisted
Ben Speight	North Melbourne	29 October 2012	Delisted
Ben Warren	North Melbourne	29 October 2012	Delisted
Gerrick Weedon	West Coast	29 October 2012	Delisted
Andrew Strijk	West Coast	29 October 2012	Delisted
Simon Buckley	Collingwood	29 October 2012	Delisted
Jonathon Ceglar	Collingwood	29 October 2012	Delisted
Luke Rounds	Collingwood	29 October 2012	Delisted
Kirk Ugle	Collingwood	29 October 2012	Delisted
Cameron Wood	Collingwood	29 October 2012	Delisted
Tom Gillies	Geelong	30 October 2012	Delisted
Jonathan Simpkin	Geelong	30 October 2012	Delisted
Orren Stephenson	Geelong	30 October 2012	Delisted
Sam Lonergan	Essendon	30 October 2012	Delisted
Kyle Reimers	Essendon	30 October 2012	Delisted
Michael Osborne	Hawthorn	30 October 2012	Delisted
Tom Schneider	Hawthorn	30 October 2012	Delisted
Adam Pattison	Hawthorn	30 October 2012	Delisted
Broc McCauley	Hawthorn	30 October 2012	Retired
Jason Gram	St Kilda	30 October 2012	Contract terminated
Nicholas Winmar	St Kilda	24 November 2012	Delisted
Peter Yagmoor	Collingwood	29 November 2012	Delisted

== Mini-draft ==
As part of their entry concessions, Greater Western Sydney was allocated up to four selections in a mini-draft, which could be used to recruit seventeen-year-olds who would not otherwise be eligible for that year's national draft. These players could not play senior AFL football until the 2014 season. GWS could not use these draft picks themselves, but could trade them to other clubs prior to either the 2011 or 2012 AFL Drafts. In 2011, Gold Coast and Adelaide negotiated trades with GWS for selections in this draft and selected Jaeger O'Meara and Brad Crouch. The two remaining selections for the 2012 mini-draft were obtained by the Gold Coast (pick No. 1) and Melbourne (pick No. 2). Western Australian youngsters Jack Martin and Jesse Hogan were widely expected to be taken with the two Mini-draft picks.

Pick	Player	Recruited from	League	Club
1	Jack Martin	Claremont Football Club	WAFL	Gold Coast
2	Jesse Hogan	Claremont Football Club	WAFL	Melbourne

== 2012 national draft ==
The 2012 AFL national draft was held on 22 November at the Gold Coast Convention Centre.

During the free agency and trade period, the Adelaide Football Club was investigated for draft tampering and breaches of the salary cap relating to the 2009 contract extension of Kurt Tippett, who was seeking a trade. Adelaide was likely to incur a loss of draft picks, among other penalties, if found guilty, but the AFL Commission was yet to complete its hearing into the matter when the National Draft was held, so the club was permitted to participate in this year's draft as normal. However, on the day before the draft, the club voluntarily relinquished its highest two remaining selections (No. 20 and 54) as a "gesture of goodwill" ahead of the hearing. When the final penalties were handed down on 30 November, Adelaide was also stripped of its first and second round draft picks in the 2013 National Draft, as well as receiving a fine; Tippett received an 11-match suspension, and a fine.

^	Denotes player who has been inducted to the Australian Football Hall of Fame
*	Denotes player who has been a premiership player and been selected for at least one All-Australian team
^{+}	Denotes player who has been a premiership player at least once
^{x}	Denotes player who has been selected for at least one All-Australian team
^{#}	Denotes player who has never played in a VFL/AFL home and away season or finals game
^{~}	Denotes player who has been selected as Rising Star

Round	Pick	Player	Recruited from	League	Drafted to	Notes
1	1	Lachie Whitfield	Dandenong Stingrays	TAC Cup	Greater Western Sydney	
1	2	Jonathan O'Rourke	Calder Cannons	TAC Cup	Greater Western Sydney	Traded from Gold Coast
1	3	Lachie Plowman	Calder Cannons	TAC Cup	Greater Western Sydney	Traded from Melbourne
1	4	Jimmy Toumpas	Woodville-West Torrens	SANFL	Melbourne	Greater Western Sydney uncontracted player compensation pick (Scully)
1	5	Jake Stringer	Bendigo Pioneers	TAC Cup	Western Bulldogs	
1	6	Jack Macrae	Oakleigh Chargers	TAC Cup	Western Bulldogs	Greater Western Sydney uncontracted player compensation pick (Ward)
1	7	Ollie Wines	Bendigo Pioneers	TAC Cup	Port Adelaide	
1	8	Sam Mayes	North Adelaide	SANFL	Brisbane Lions	
1	9	Nick Vlastuin	Northern Knights	TAC Cup	Richmond	
1	10	Joe Daniher	Calder Cannons	TAC Cup	Essendon	Father-son selection (son of Anthony Daniher. Matched Port Adelaide's bid at pick #7)
1	11	Troy Menzel	Central District	SANFL	Carlton	
1	12	Kristian Jaksch	Oakleigh Chargers	TAC Cup	Greater Western Sydney	Traded from St Kilda
1	13	Jesse Lonergan	Launceston	TSL	Gold Coast	Traded from St Kilda, free agency compensation pick (Goddard)
1	14	Aidan Corr	Northern Knights	TAC Cup	Greater Western Sydney	Traded from Melbourne, Greater Western Sydney uncontracted player compensation pick (Scully)
1	15	Taylor Garner	Dandenong Stingrays	TAC Cup	North Melbourne	
1	16	Jackson Thurlow	Launceston	TSL	Geelong	
1	17	Josh Simpson	East Fremantle	WAFL	Fremantle	
1	18	Brodie Grundy	Sturt	SANFL	Collingwood	Traded from West Coast
1	19	Ben Kennedy	Glenelg	SANFL	Collingwood	
1	relinquished				Adelaide	voluntarily surrendered ahead of Kurt Tippett draft tampering hearing
1	20	Tim Broomhead	Port Adelaide Magpies	SANFL	Collingwood	Traded by Melbourne, received from Adelaide, Greater Western Sydney uncontracted player compensation pick (Davis)
1	21	Nathan Hrovat	Northern Knights	TAC Cup	Western Bulldogs	Traded from Hawthorn
1	22	Dean Towers	North Ballarat	VFL	Sydney	
1	23	Marco Paparone	East Fremantle	WAFL	Brisbane Lions	Gold Coast uncontracted player compensation pick (Rischitelli)
2	24	Nathan Wright	Dandenong Stingrays	TAC Cup	St Kilda	Traded from Greater Western Sydney
2	25	Spencer White	Western Jets	TAC Cup	St Kilda	Traded from Gold Coast
2	26	Jack Viney	Oakleigh Chargers	TAC Cup	Melbourne	Father-son selection (son of Todd Viney. Matched Port Adelaide bid at pick #7 (as per Daniher))
2	27	James Stewart	Sandringham Dragons	TAC Cup	Greater Western Sydney	Traded by Hawthorn, received from Western Bulldogs
2	28	Tim O'Brien	Glenelg	SANFL	Hawthorn	Traded by Greater Western Sydney, received from Port Adelaide
2	29	Tom Clurey	Murray Bushrangers	TAC Cup	Port Adelaide	Free agency compensation pick (Pearce)
2	30	Mason Shaw	South Fremantle	WAFL	Port Adelaide	Free agency compensation pick (Chaplin)
2	31	Kamdyn McIntosh	Peel Thunder	WAFL	Richmond	Traded from Port Adelaide, Gold Coast uncontracted player compensation pick (Krakouer)
2	32	Michael Close	North Ballarat Rebels	TAC Cup	Brisbane Lions	
2	33	Liam McBean	Calder Cannons	TAC Cup	Richmond	
2	34	Jason Ashby	Oakleigh Chargers	TAC Cup	Essendon	
2	35	Tom Temay	Sandringham Dragons	TAC Cup	Carlton	
2	36	Tanner Smith	North Ballarat Rebels	TAC Cup	Fremantle	Traded by Gold Coast, received from St Kilda
2	37	Ben Jacobs	Port Adelaide	AFL	North Melbourne	
2	38	Jackson Ramsay	East Perth	WAFL	Collingwood	Traded by North Melbourne, received from Geelong
2	39	Max Duffy	East Fremantle	WAFL	Fremantle	
2	40	Brodie Murdoch	Glenelg	SANFL	St Kilda	Traded from West Coast
2	41	Mason Wood	Geelong Falcons	TAC Cup	North Melbourne	Traded from Collingwood
2	42	Matthew McDonough	Woodville-West Torrens	SANFL	Richmond	Traded from Adelaide
2	43	Josh Saunders	Geelong Falcons	TAC Cup	St Kilda	Traded by West Coast, received from Hawthorn
2	44	Harrison Marsh	East Fremantle	WAFL	Sydney	
3	45	Brant Colledge	Perth	WAFL	West Coast	Traded by St Kilda, received from Greater Western Sydney
3	46	Tim Membrey	Gippsland Power	TAC Cup	Sydney	Traded by St Kilda, received from Gold Coast
3	47	Mitchell Wilkins	Norwood	SANFL	North Melbourne	Traded by Collingwood, received from Melbourne
3	48	Dean Kent	Perth	WAFL	Melbourne	Free agency compensation pick
3	49	Lachie Hunter	Western Jets	TAC Cup	Western Bulldogs	Father-son selection (son of Mark Hunter. Matched North Melbourne bid with pick #35.)
3	50	Josh Prudden	Murray Bushrangers	TAC Cup	Western Bulldogs	Greater Western Sydney uncontracted player compensation pick (Reid)
3	51	Dylan Van Unen	Frankston	VFL	Essendon	Traded from Port Adelaide
3	52	Matt Jones	Box Hill Hawks	VFL	Melbourne	Traded from Brisbane Lions
3	relinquished				Adelaide	Traded from Richmond, voluntarily surrendered ahead of Kurt Tippett draft tampering hearing,
3	53	Martin Gleeson	North Ballarat Rebels	TAC Cup	Essendon	
3	54	Nick Graham	Gippsland Power	TAC Cup	Carlton	
3	55	Tim Sumner	Woodville-West Torrens	SANFL	Gold Coast	Traded from St Kilda
3	56	Daniel Currie	North Adelaide	SANFL	North Melbourne	
3	57	Kyal Horsley	(Rookie promotion)		Gold Coast	Traded from Geelong
3	58	Clay Cameron	Mount Gravatt	NEAFL	Gold Coast	Traded from Fremantle
3	59	Adam Carter	South Fremantle	WAFL	West Coast	
3	60	Mark Hutchings	West Perth	WAFL	West Coast	Free agency compensation pick (Lynch)
3	61	Taylor Hine	Gold Coast	AFL	North Melbourne	Traded by Melbourne, received from Collingwood
3	62	Sam Siggins	Lauderdale	TSL	Adelaide	
3	63	Pass			Greater Western Sydney	Traded from Hawthorn
3	64	Matthew Dick	Calder Cannons	TAC Cup	Sydney	Traded from Hawthorn, free agency compensation pick (Young)
3	65	Pass			Sydney	
4	66	Kaiden Brand	West Adelaide	SANFL	Hawthorn	Traded from Greater Western Sydney
4	67	Pass			Greater Western Sydney	Traded from Gold Coast
4	68	Dean Terlich	Norwood	SANFL	Melbourne	
4	69	Pass			Carlton	Traded by Collingwood, received from Western Bulldogs
4	70	Michael Osborne	Hawthorn	AFL	Hawthorn	Traded by Sydney, received from Port Adelaide
4	71	Daniel Nicholson	(Rookie promotion)		Melbourne	Traded from Brisbane Lions
4	72	Michael Evans	(Rookie promotion)		Melbourne	Traded by North Melbourne, received from Richmond
4	73	Nicholas Kommer	East Perth	WAFL	Essendon	
4	74	Pass			Carlton	
4	75	Lewis Pierce	Dandenong Stingrays	TAC Cup	St Kilda	
4	76	Sam Gibson	(Rookie promotion)		North Melbourne	
4	77	Brad Hartman	Sturt	SANFL	Geelong	
4	78	Clancee Pearce	(Rookie promotion)		Fremantle	
4	79	Brad Dick	(Rookie promotion)		West Coast	
4	80	Pass			Collingwood	
4	81	Rory Atkins	Calder Cannons	TAC Cup	Adelaide	
4	82	Pass			Port Adelaide	Traded from Sydney
5	83	Sam Frost	(Rookie promotion)		Greater Western Sydney	
5	84	Pass			Western Bulldogs	
5	85	Tom Jonas	(Rookie promotion)		Port Adelaide	
5	86	Jack Crisp+	(Rookie promotion)		Brisbane Lions	
5	87	Pass			Richmond	
5	88	Sean Gregory	Calder Cannons	TAC Cup	Essendon	
5	89	Levi Casboult	(Rookie promotion)		Carlton	
5	90	Sam Dunell	(Rookie promotion)		St Kilda	
5	91	Aaron Mullett	(Rookie promotion)		North Melbourne	
5	92	Jesse Stringer	(Rookie promotion)		Geelong	
5	93	Lee Spurr	(Rookie promotion)		Fremantle	
5	94	Marley Williams	(Rookie promotion)		Collingwood	
5	95	Ian Callinan	(Rookie promotion)		Adelaide	
5	96	Pass			Sydney	
6	97	Andrew Phillips	(Rookie promotion)		Greater Western Sydney	
6	98	Tom Campbell	(Rookie promotion)		Western Bulldogs	
6	99	Niall McKeever	(Rookie promotion)		Brisbane Lions	
6	100	Pass			Richmond	
6	101	Pass			Essendon	
6	102	Zach Tuohy	(Rookie promotion)		Carlton	
6	103	Majak Daw	(Rookie promotion)		North Melbourne	
6	104	Pass			Sydney	
7	105	Jason Johannisen	(Rookie promotion)		Western Bulldogs	
7	106	Mark Baguley	(Rookie promotion)		Essendon	
7	107	Harry Cunningham	(Rookie promotion)		Sydney	

- Source: AFL Draft Order

Notes:

- Compensation picks are selections in addition to the normal order of selection, allocated to clubs by the AFL as compensation for losing uncontracted players to the new expansion clubs, Gold Coast and Greater Western Sydney. The picks can be held for up to five years and clubs declare at the beginning of the season of their intent to utilise the pick at the end of the season. Picks could be traded to other clubs in return for players or other draft selections.
- free agency compensation picks are additional selections awarded to teams based on their net loss of players during the free agency trade period.
- Promoted rookies are players who are transferred from a club's rookie list to their primary list.
- Local talent selections are local zone selections available to the new expansion clubs.

== 2013 pre-season draft ==
The 2013 AFL pre-season draft was held on 11 December 2012.

Round	Pick	Player	Recruited from	League	Drafted to
1	1	Bret Thornton	Carlton	AFL	Greater Western Sydney
1	2	Pass			Western Bulldogs
1	3	Sam Colquhoun	Central District	SANFL	Port Adelaide
1	4	Pass			Brisbane Lions
1	5	Pass			Richmond
1	6	Will Hams	Gippsland Power	TAC Cup	Essendon
1	7	Pass			Carlton
1	8	Jack Hannath	Central District	SANFL	Fremantle
1	9	Pass			Collingwood
1	10	Nick Joyce	Adelaide	AFL	Adelaide
1	11	Kurt Tippett	Adelaide	AFL	Sydney
2	12	Dean Brogan	Greater Western Sydney	AFL	Greater Western Sydney
2	13	Pass			Carlton
2	14	Jesse Crichton	Fremantle	AFL	Fremantle
2	15	Pass			Collingwood
2	16	Pass			Sydney
3	17	Pass			Sydney

== 2013 rookie draft ==
The 2013 AFL rookie draft was held on 11 December 2012.

Round	Pick	Player	Recruited from	League	Drafted to
1	1	Pass			Greater Western Sydney
1	2	Leigh Osborne	Frankston	VFL	Gold Coast
1	3	Nathan Stark	Glenelg	SANFL	Melbourne
1	4	Brett Goodes	Williamstown	VFL	Western Bulldogs
1	5	Kane Mitchell	Claremont	WAFL	Port Adelaide
1	6	Nicholas Hayes	Woodville West Torrens	SANFL	Brisbane Lions
1	7	Ricky Petterd	Melbourne	AFL	Richmond
1	8	Ariel Steinberg	Essendon	AFL	Essendon
1	9	Jaryd Cachia	Norwood	SANFL	Carlton
1	10	Tim McGenniss	Dandenong Stingrays	TAC Cup	North Melbourne
1	11	Matt Taberner	Murray Bushrangers	TAC Cup	Fremantle
1	12	Callum Sinclair	Subiaco	WAFL	West Coast
1	13	Kyle Martin	Frankston	VFL	Collingwood
1	14	Kyle Hartigan	Werribee	VFL	Adelaide
1	15	John Ceglar	Collingwood	AFL	Hawthorn
1	16	Jake Lloyd	North Ballarat Rebels	TAC Cup	Sydney
2	17	Pass			Greater Western Sydney
2	18	Pass			Gold Coast
2	19	Mitch Clisby	North Adelaide	SANFL	Melbourne
2	20	Justin Hoskin	Port Adelaide Magpies	SANFL	Port Adelaide
2	21	Callum Bartlett	Brisbane Lions	AFL	Brisbane Lions
2	22	Sam Lonergan	Essendon	AFL	Richmond
2	23	Andrew Collins	Carlton	AFL	Carlton
2	24	Ben Speight	North Melbourne	AFL	North Melbourne
2	25	Alex Howson	East Fremantle	WAFL	Fremantle
2	26	Jamie Bennell	Melbourne	AFL	West Coast
2	27	Sam Dwyer	Port Melbourne	VFL	Collingwood
2	28	Ciarán Kilkenny	Dublin GAA	GAA	Hawthorn
2	29	Xavier Richards	Sandringham Dragons	TAC Cup	Sydney
3	30	Pass			Greater Western Sydney
3	31	Pass			Gold Coast
3	32	Pass			Brisbane Lions
3	33	Orren Stephenson	Geelong	AFL	Richmond
3	34	Cameron Richardson	North Melbourne	AFL	North Melbourne
3	35	Adam Oxley	Redland	NEAFL	Collingwood
3	36	Jack Osborn	Alternative talent	(Basketball)	Adelaide
3	37	Dane Rampe	UNSW-Eastern Suburbs	AFL Sydney	Sydney
4	38	Pass			Greater Western Sydney
4	39	Pass			Gold Coast
4	40	Cadeyn Williams	Murray Bushrangers	TAC Cup	Richmond
4	41	Jack Frost	Williamstown	VFL	Collingwood
4	42	Tim Klaosen	Alternative talent	(Basketball)	Adelaide
4	43	Pass			St Kilda
5	44	Pass			Greater Western Sydney
5	45	Pass			Gold Coast
5	46	Craig Moller	Sydney Uni	NEAFL	Fremantle
5	47	Ben Hudson	Brisbane Lions	AFL	Collingwood
6	48	Pass			Gold Coast
6	49	Peter Yagmoor	Collingwood	AFL	Collingwood
6	50	Daniel Robinson	NSW/ACT Rams	TAC Cup	Sydney
7	51	Joseph Redfern	Sydney Hills Eagles	NEAFL	Greater Western Sydney
7	52	Pass			Gold Coast
7	53	Ben Richmond	Alternative Talent	(Basketball)	Collingwood
8	54	Zac Williams	Narrandera	Riverina Football League	Greater Western Sydney
8	55	Andrew Boston	Broadbeach	NEAFL	Gold Coast
9	58	Brandon Jack	Pennant Hills	AFL Sydney	Sydney
9	59	Sam Naismith	North Shore	AFL Sydney	Sydney
10	63	Jordon Bourke	Morningside	NEAFL	Brisbane Lions
