= 2012 AFL Under 18 Championships =

Youth Australian rules football competition

- Teams: 8

Division 1
- Teams: 4
- Champions: Vic Metro
- Larke Medal: Lachie Whitfield

Division 2
- Teams: 4
- Champions: Northern Territory
- Hunter Harrison Medal: Jake Neade

The 2012 NAB AFL Under 18 Championships was the 17th edition of the AFL Under 18 Championships. Eight teams competed in the championships: Vic Metro, Vic Country, South Australia and Western Australia in Division 1, and New South Wales/Australian Capital Territory (NSW/ACT), Northern Territory, Queensland and Tasmania in Division 2. The competition was played over five rounds, in seven states and territories, across two divisions. In the first two rounds of the competition, the second-division teams crossed over and played the division one sides, while the final three rounds of matches were played between the teams in each the division. Vic Metro and the Northern Territory were the Division 1 and Division 2 champions, respectively. The Larke Medal (for the best player in Division 1) was awarded to Vic Country's Lachie Whitfield, and the Hunter Harrison Medal (for the best player in Division 2) was won by the Northern Territory's Jake Neade.

== Results ==
=== Round 1 ===
	Round 1
Saturday, 26 May (6:30pm)	Northern Territory 15.10 (100)	def.	Vic Metro 11.16 (82)	TIO Stadium	Report
Saturday, 2 June (11:00am)	Queensland 10.6 (66)	def.	Western Australia 8.16 (64)	Blacktown ISP Oval	Report
Saturday, 2 June (1:30pm)	NSW/ACT 7.9 (51)	def. by	Vic Country 8.12 (60)	Blacktown ISP Oval	Report
Sunday, 3 June (11:30am)	Tasmania 7.8 (50)	def. by	South Australia 30.14 (194)	Blundstone Arena	Report

=== Round 2 ===
	Round 2
Saturday, 9 June (12:00pm)	Western Australia 14.17 (101)	def.	NSW/ACT 5.5 (35)	Arena Joondalup	Report
Sunday, 10 June (12:00pm)	Vic Country 15.15 (105)	def.	Queensland 1.5 (11)	Visy Park	Report
Sunday, 10 June (1:00pm)	South Australia 16.13 (109)	def.	Northern Territory 12.8 (80)	Norwood Oval	Report
Sunday, 10 June (2:30pm)	Vic Metro 21.11 (137)	def.	Tasmania 6.5 (41)	Visy Park	Report

=== Round 3 ===
	Round 3
Saturday, 16 June (12:00pm)	South Australia 12.13 (85)	def. by	Vic Metro 16.7 (103)	Alberton Oval	Report
Sunday, 17 June (12:00pm)	Western Australia 13.14 (92)	def.	Vic Country 11.8 (74)	Patersons Stadium	Report
Saturday, 23 June (12:00pm)	Queensland 6.17 (53)	def. by	Tasmania 9.7 (61)	Yeronga	Report
Saturday, 23 June (12:00pm)	NSW/ACT 6.11 (47)	def. by	Northern Territory 20.10 (130)	Blacktown ISP Oval	Report

=== Round 4 ===
	Round 4
Friday, 29 June (12:00pm)	Vic Country 6.15 (51)	def. by	Vic Metro 8.18 (66)	Simonds Stadium
Friday, 29 June (2:30pm)	Western Australia 4.10 (34)	def. by	South Australia 12.12 (84)	Simonds Stadium	Report
Saturday, 30 June (12:00pm)	Northern Territory 10.7 (67)	def. by	Queensland 11.8 (74)	Visy Park	Report
Saturday, 30 June (2:30pm)	Tasmania 14.7 (91)	def.	NSW/ACT 6.14 (50)	Visy Park	Report

=== Round 5 ===
	Round 5
Wednesday, 4 July (5:35pm)	Vic Country 10.9 (69)	def. by	South Australia 13.4 (82)	Etihad Stadium	Report
Wednesday, 4 July (7:35pm)	Vic Metro 14.12 (96)	def.	Western Australia 10.12 (72)	Etihad Stadium	Report
Thursday, 5 July (12:00pm)	Northern Territory 9.9 (63)	def.	Tasmania 5.9 (39)	Simonds Stadium	Report
Thursday, 5 July (2:15pm)	Queensland 10.7 (67)	def.	NSW/ACT 6.3 (39)	Simonds Stadium	Report

== Under 18 All-Australian team ==
The 2012 Under 18 All-Australian team was named on 6 July 2012:

2012 Under 18 All-Australian team
B:	Sam Colquhoun (SA)	Matt Scharenberg (SA)	Luke McDonald (VM)
HB:	Jimmy Toumpas (SA)	Jesse Hogan (WA)	Nick Vlastuin (VM)
C:	James Aish (SA)	Ollie Wines (VC)	Lachie Whitfield (VC)
HF:	Jack Billings (VM)	Taylor Garner (VC)	Jack Martin (WA)
F:	Ben Kennedy (SA)	Joe Daniher (VM)	Matthew McDonough (SA)
Foll:	Brodie Grundy (SA)	Jonathan O'Rourke (VM)	Nathan Hrovat (VM)
Int:	Andrew Boston (Qld)	Dayle Garlett (WA)	Jake Neade (NT)
Int:	Jackson Thurlow (Tas)		
Coach:	Brenton Toy (NT); assistant coach - Rohan Welsh (VM)		
