= Spencer White =

Australian rules footballer

Personal information
- Full name: Spencer White
- Born: 22 September 1994 (age 32)
- Original team: Western Jets (TAC Cup)
- Draft: No. 25, 2012 National Draft
- Height: 196 cm (6 ft 5 in)
- Weight: 84 kg (185 lb)
- Position: Forward

Playing career^{1}
Years	Club	Games (Goals)
2013–2015	St Kilda	2 (4)
- ^{1} Playing statistics correct to the end of 2014.

Spencer White (born 22 September 1994) is a former professional Australian rules footballer who played for St Kilda Football Club in the Australian Football League (AFL). White was selected by St Kilda with pick 25 in the 2012 AFL draft from the Western Jets in the TAC Cup. He is a tall, mobile, key position forward.

White had to wait until the second last round of the 2014 AFL season to make his AFL debut, against Richmond, where he kicked three goals. He was delisted at the conclusion of the 2015 AFL season.

White signed with WAFL side Perth for the 2016 season, playing 26 games for them in the next three seasons.

White signed with North Hobart Football Club for the 2023 TSL season.
