= Nathan Wright (footballer) =

Australian rules footballer

Personal information
- Full name: Nathan Wright
- Born: 16 February 1994 (age 32)
- Original team: Dandenong Stingrays (TAC Cup)
- Draft: No. 24, 2012 Draft (St Kilda)
- Height: 185 cm (6 ft 1 in)
- Weight: 77 kg (12 st 2 lb; 170 lb)

Playing career^{1}
Years	Club	Games (Goals)
2013–2018	St Kilda	35 (9)
- ^{1} Playing statistics correct to the end of 2018.

Nathan Wright (born 16 February 1994) is a former Australian rules footballer who played with the St Kilda Football Club in the Australian Football League (AFL).

Wright was St Kilda's first selection, number 24 overall, in the 2012 AFL draft. He was recruited from the Dandenong Stingrays and was also a graduate of the AIS-AFL Academy program. He made his AFL debut in the Round 3 match against Greater Western Sydney.

In his fifth AFL game, against Carlton, Wright suffered a broken jaw when he was bumped by Eddie Betts. Despite a public apology by Betts, the AFL Match Review Panel deemed Betts' actions to be reckless rough conduct and suspended him from playing for three matches.

Wright was delisted at the end of 2018, he managed 5 games in his last two years and was injury prone.
