= Jimmy Toumpas =

Australian rules footballer

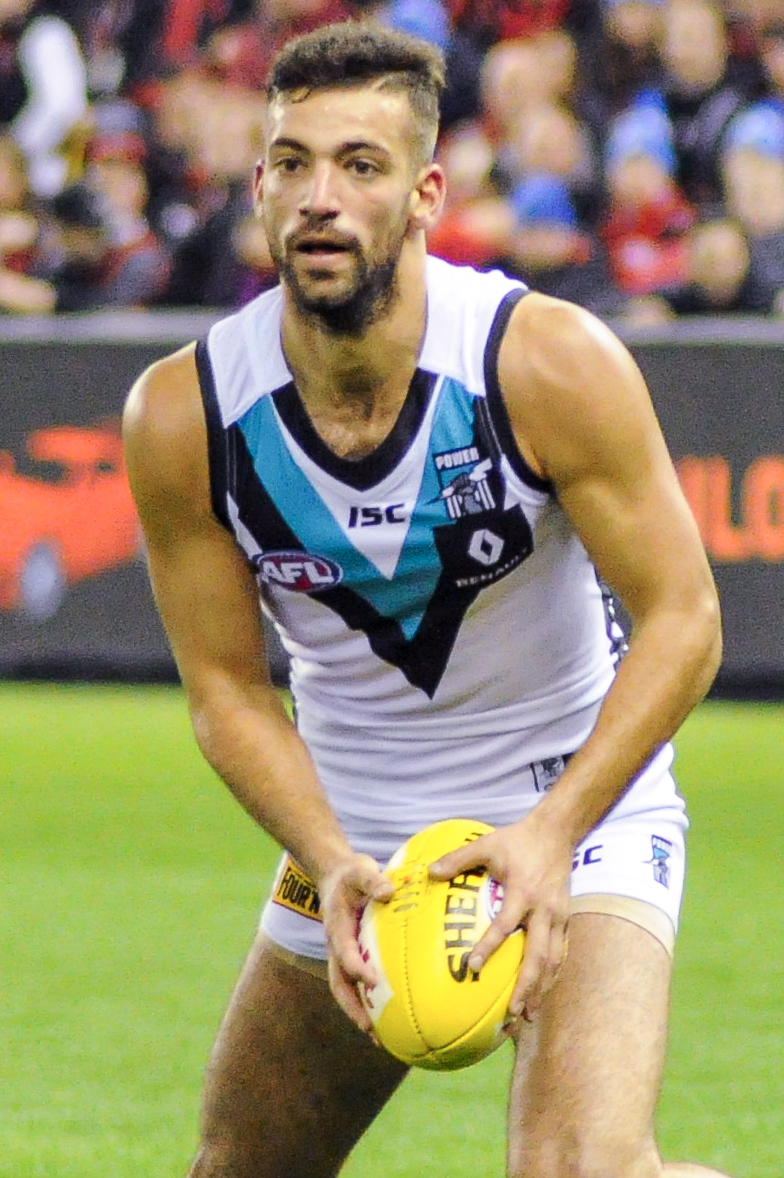
- Toumpas playing for Port Adelaide in June 2017

Personal information
- Full name: Dimitri Toumpas
- Nickname: Jimmy
- Born: 2 January 1994 (age 32)
- Original team: Woodville-West Torrens (SANFL)
- Draft: No. 4, 2012 national draft
- Debut: Round 1, 2013, Melbourne vs. Port Adelaide, at MCG
- Height: 183 cm (6 ft 0 in)
- Weight: 82 kg (181 lb)
- Position: Midfielder

Playing career^{1}
Years	Club	Games (Goals)
2013–2015	Melbourne	27 (6)
2016–2018	Port Adelaide	10 (1)
Total		37 (7)
- ^{1} Playing statistics correct to the end of 2018.

Career highlights
- 2012 AFL Under 18 Championships: Captain of South Australia; All-Australian selection; Woodville-West Torrens premiership 2011, 2020, 2021

Dimitri "Jimmy" Toumpas (born 2 January 1994) is a former professional Australian rules footballer best known for his time at the Melbourne Football Club where he played 27 games from 2013 to 2015.

He was drafted by Melbourne with the fourth selection in the 2012 AFL draft, after playing for Woodville-West Torrens in the South Australian National Football League (SANFL). He made his SANFL senior debut late in the 2011 season and he played in Woodville West-Torrens' 2011 premiership side in only his fifth game. He was the captain of the South Australian team at the 2012 AFL Under 18 Championships and was named in the All-Australian team at the conclusion of the tournament.

In October 2015, Toumpas was traded to Port Adelaide.

In August 2018 he was delisted by Port Adelaide Football Club without having played an AFL game that season. In 2025, Toumpas began a new role at St Peter's College, Adelaide as Head of Football, leading the school's football program.

== Statistics ==
Statistics are correct to the end of the 2016 season

Season	Team	No.	Games	Totals							Averages (per game)						
Season	Team	No.	Games	G	B	K	H	D	M	T	G	B	K	H	D	M	T
2013	Melbourne	5	14	0	3	93	75	168	43	35	0.0	0.2	6.6	5.4	12.0	3.1	2.5
2014	Melbourne	5	4	2	1	38	18	56	21	7	0.5	0.3	9.5	4.5	14.0	5.3	1.8
2015	Melbourne	5	9	4	0	59	76	135	27	28	0.4	0.0	6.6	8.4	15.0	3.0	3.1
2016	Port Adelaide	18	8	1	2	64	69	133	22	26	0.1	0.3	8.0	8.6	16.6	2.8	3.3
Career			35	7	6	254	238	492	113	96	0.2	0.2	7.3	6.8	14.1	3.2	2.7
