= Kristian Jaksch =

Australian rules footballer (born 1994)

Personal information
- Born: 7 October 1994 (age 32)
- Original team: Oakleigh Chargers (TAC Cup)
- Draft: No. 12, 2012 national draft
- Height: 195 cm (6 ft 5 in)
- Weight: 84 kg (185 lb)
- Position: Defender

Playing career^{1}
Years	Club	Games (Goals)
2013–2014	Greater Western Sydney	7 (2)
2015–2017	Carlton	7 (1)
Total		14 (3)
- ^{1} Playing statistics correct to the end of 2017.

Kristian Jaksch (born 7 October 1994) is a former professional Australian rules footballer who played for the Greater Western Sydney Giants and Carlton Football Club in the Australian Football League (AFL). He was a versatile key position player who could play both in the forward line and as a defender. He played for the Oakleigh Chargers in the TAC Cup before being drafted by Greater Western Sydney with pick 12 in the 2012 national draft. In 2014 he was traded to Carlton, and at the end of the 2017 season he was delisted after playing just 14 AFL games in 5 seasons.

== Early life ==
Jaksch was previously a student at Carey Baptist Grammar School and played for most of his childhood as a forward. In 2012 he played in the TAC Cup for the Oakleigh Chargers as a defender, and he was selected with the twelfth in the 2012 AFL draft by Greater Western Sydney.

== AFL career ==
=== Greater Western Sydney (2013–2014) ===
Jaksch had a knee injury early in 2013 which limited his opportunities, and he made his debut in round 22 against Richmond, the team he grew up supporting. He kicked a goal with his first kick. In October 2014, Jaksch was traded to Carlton.

=== Carlton (2015–2017) ===
In his first pre-season at Carlton, Jaksch injured his left foot, causing him to miss out on two months of training. He returned to training in February, but after making his debut for Carlton in round 1, 2015 against Richmond, he suffered two broken ribs which sidelined him again. His injury troubles continued when he injured his ankle later in the season. For the rest of his career, Jaksch mostly played for Carlton's VFL side the Northern Blues. In a match against the Casey in 2017 he kicked 5 goals in a 55-point win. Jaksch was delisted by Carlton at the end of the 2017 season.

== Player profile ==
Jaksch was known as a key position player who could play either in the forward line or as a key defender. He started his career as a forward, but began to also play as a defender when he was playing in the TAC Cup, showing versatility which helped him to get drafted as a first round pick. He was also a strong mark overhead.

== Statistics ==
Statistics are correct to end of the 2017 season

Legend
G	Goals	K	Kicks	D	Disposals	T	Tackles
B	Behinds	H	Handballs	M	Marks

Season	Team	No.	Games	Totals							Averages (per game)						
Season	Team	No.	Games	G	B	K	H	D	M	T	G	B	K	H	D	M	T
2013	Greater Western Sydney	34	2	1	0	10	5	15	8	1	0.5	0.0	5.0	2.5	7.5	4.0	0.5
2014	Greater Western Sydney	34	5	1	1	33	13	46	13	7	0.2	0.2	6.6	2.6	9.2	2.6	1.4
2015	Carlton	18	6	1	2	39	23	62	26	8	0.2	0.3	6.5	3.8	10.3	4.3	1.3
2016	Carlton	18	1	0	0	7	1	8	2	2	0.0	0.0	7.0	1.0	8.0	2.0	2.0
2017	Carlton	18	0														
Career			14	3	3	89	42	131	49	18	0.2	0.2	6.4	3.0	9.4	3.5	1.3
