= Allan Sinclair =

Australian rules footballer

Personal information
- Full name: Allan Sinclair
- Born: 13 June 1953 (age 73)
- Original team: Croydon (EDFL)
- Height: 196 cm (6 ft 5 in)
- Weight: 91 kg (201 lb)
- Position: Ruckman / Forward

Playing career^{1}
Years	Club	Games (Goals)
1973–1978	Fitzroy (VFL)	39 (11)
1979	St Kilda (VFL)	2 (1)
1979–1980	Port Melbourne (VFA)	21 (?)
Total		62 (12+)
- ^{1} Playing statistics correct to the end of 1980.

Allan Sinclair is a former Australian rules footballer who played with Fitzroy and Saint Kilda in the Victorian Football League (VFL) and Port Melbourne in the Victorian Football Association (VFA). His son Callum currently plays for Sydney Swans.
