= Brodie Murdoch =

Australian rules footballer

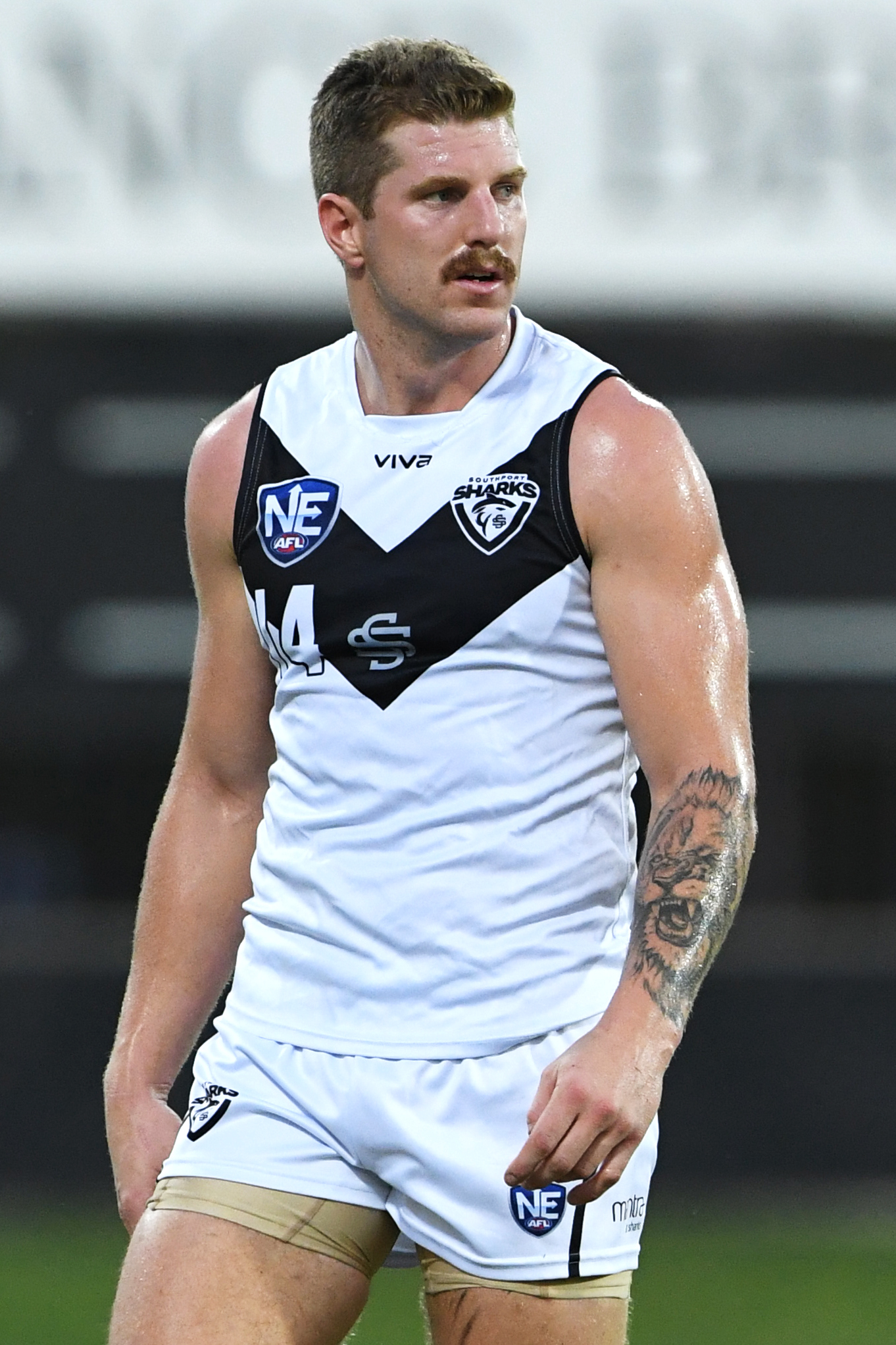
- Murdoch in August 2018

Personal information
- Full name: Brodie Murdoch
- Born: 21 January 1994 (age 32); North Adelaide
- Original team: Glenelg (SANFL)
- Draft: No. 40, 2012 national draft
- Height: 190 cm (6 ft 3 in)
- Weight: 85 kg (187 lb)

Playing career^{1}
Years	Club	Games (Goals)
2013–2016	St Kilda	22 (9)
- ^{1} Playing statistics correct to the end of 2016.

Brodie Murdoch (born 21 January 1994) is a former professional Australian rules footballer who played for the St Kilda Football Club in the Australian Football League (AFL). He was recruited by the club in the 2012 National Draft from SANFL club Glenelg, with pick 40. His original country club is Port MacDonnell in the Southeast of SA. Murdoch made his debut in Round 5, 2013, against Sydney at Westpac Stadium in Wellington NZ. At the conclusion of the 2016 season, he was delisted by St Kilda. He went on to win consecutive premierships with Port Melbourne in the VFL (2017) and Southport in the NEAFL (2018).
