= Lachie Whitfield =

Australian rules footballer

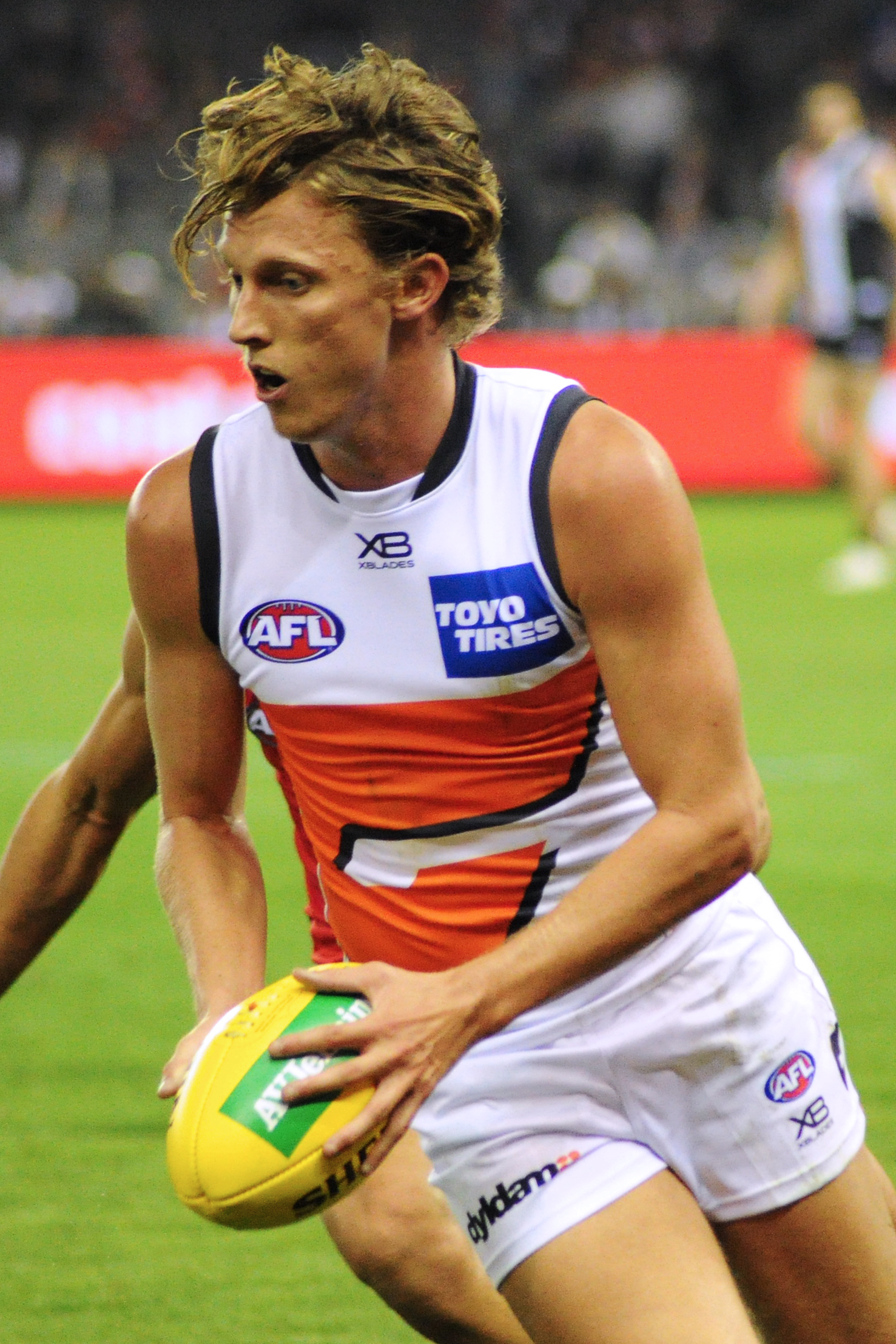
- Whitfield playing for Greater Western Sydney in April 2018

Personal information
- Full name: Lachlan Whitfield
- Born: 18 July 1994 (age 32)
- Original team: Dandenong Stingrays (TAC Cup)
- Draft: No. 1, 2012 national draft
- Height: 185 cm (6 ft 1 in)
- Weight: 81 kg (179 lb)
- Position: Defender

Club information
- Current club: Carlton

Playing career^{1}
Years	Club	Games (Goals)
2013–2026	Greater Western Sydney	278 (72)
2027–	Carlton	0 (0)
Total		278 (72)

Representative team honours
Years	Team	Games (Goals)
2020	Victoria	1 (0)
- ^{1} Playing statistics correct to the end of the 2026 season.

Career highlights
- 2× All-Australian team: 2018, 2024; 2× Kevin Sheedy Medal: 2018, 2020; 2013 AFL Rising Star nominee; 2012 Larke Medal

Lachlan Whitfield (born 18 July 1994) is a professional Australian rules footballer playing for the Carlton Football Club in the Australian Football League (AFL). He was originally drafted by Greater Western Sydney with the first overall selection in the 2012 AFL draft.

== Early years ==
He played in the TAC Cup for the Dandenong Stingrays. He won the Larke Medal as the best player at the 2012 AFL Under 18 Championships.

Growing up, he supported the Hawthorn Football Club.

== AFL career ==
In November 2016, Whitfield was suspended for six months for "bringing the game into disrepute" as a result of taking illicit drugs in May 2015 and attempting to evade drug testing, assisted by Greater Western Sydney administrators Graeme Allan and Craig Lambert.

At the end of the 2017 season, Whitfield signed a contract extension with the Giants, keeping him at the club until the end of 2020. During the 2018 season, he was moved from the midfield into the backline as a running half-back due to several injuries to teammates. In August 2018, Whitfield was named in the 2018 All-Australian team at half-back after having a career best year in his new position. Whitfield, who was to become a free agent in 2020, ignored rumours and speculation and signed a seven-year deal, tying him to Greater Western Sydney until 2027.

However, reports emerged after the 2026 AFL season that GWS was open to trading Whitfield, and he ultimately moved to Carlton along with a swap of later picks.

== Personal life ==
Whitfield married Adelle Beckwith in October 2024.

== Statistics ==
Updated to the end of round 22, 2026.

Legend
G	Goals	K	Kicks	D	Disposals	T	Tackles
B	Behinds	H	Handballs	M	Marks

Season	Team	No.	Games	Totals							Averages (per game)							Votes
Season	Team	No.	Games	G	B	K	H	D	M	T	G	B	K	H	D	M	T	Votes
2013	Greater Western Sydney	6	19	8	4	174	158	332	103	42	0.4	0.2	9.2	8.3	17.5	5.4	2.2	1
2014	Greater Western Sydney	6	11	8	6	133	92	225	64	19	0.7	0.5	12.1	8.4	20.5	5.8	1.7	2
2015	Greater Western Sydney	6	21	6	7	270	185	455	137	38	0.3	0.3	12.9	8.8	21.7	6.5	1.8	0
2016	Greater Western Sydney	6	21	11	5	246	187	433	123	73	0.5	0.2	11.7	8.9	20.6	5.9	3.5	3
2017	Greater Western Sydney	6	18	10	7	246	186	432	109	60	0.6	0.4	13.7	10.3	24.0	6.1	3.3	5
2018	Greater Western Sydney	6	24	6	9	395	247	642	161	77	0.3	0.4	16.5	10.3	26.8	6.7	3.2	16
2019	Greater Western Sydney	6	19	11	7	322	191	513	146	53	0.6	0.4	16.9	10.1	27.0	7.7	2.8	12
2020 (Note: The 2020 season was played with 17 home-and-away matches per team (down from 22) and 16-minute quarters with time on (down from 20-minute quarters with time on) due to the impact of the COVID-19 pandemic.)	Greater Western Sydney	6	17	1	2	224	166	390	111	34	0.1	0.1	13.2	9.8	22.9	6.5	2.0	4
2021	Greater Western Sydney	6	17	3	1	283	142	425	107	41	0.2	0.1	16.6	8.4	25.0	6.3	2.4	6
2022	Greater Western Sydney	6	18	6	3	256	153	409	116	56	0.3	0.2	14.2	8.5	22.7	6.4	3.1	2
2023	Greater Western Sydney	6	24	1	1	407	240	647	139	57	0.0	0.0	17.0	10.0	27.0	5.8	2.4	5
2024	Greater Western Sydney	6	25	0	1	489	265	754	177	72	0.0	0.0	19.6	10.6	30.2	7.1	2.9	9
2025	Greater Western Sydney	6	23	0	3	440	219	659	163	58	0.0	0.1	19.1	9.5	28.7	7.1	2.5	1
2026	Greater Western Sydney	6	19	1	0	334	202	536	115	48	0.1	0.0	17.6	10.6	28.2	6.1	2.5	0
Career			276	72	56	4219	2633	6852	1771	728	0.3	0.2	15.3	9.5	24.8	6.4	2.6	66
