= Kane Mitchell =

Australian rules footballer (born 1989)

Personal information
- Full name: Kane Mitchell
- Born: 1 December 1989 (age 36); Perth, Western Australia
- Original team: Claremont (WAFL)
- Draft: No. 5, 2013 Rookie Draft: Port Adelaide
- Height: 174 cm (5 ft 9 in)
- Weight: 75 kg (165 lb)
- Position: Midfielder

Playing career^{1}
Years	Club	Games (Goals)
2013–2016	Port Adelaide	35 (19)
2008–2021	Claremont	141 (76)
2023	West Coast (WAFL)	1 (0)
- ^{1} Playing statistics correct to the end of (WAFL) Round 10 2023.

Career highlights
- Sandover Medal (2012); Claremont premiership player (2011, 2012)

Kane Mitchell (born 1 December 1989) is a former professional Australian rules footballer who played for the Port Adelaide Football Club in the Australian Football League (AFL).

Mitchell had an outstanding 2012 season with Claremont, winning the Sandover Medal for the best and fairest player in the WAFL with a record 58 votes (equalling Matt Priddis' record for Subiaco in 2006), the EB Cook Medal for Claremont's best and fairest player, and playing in Claremont's Premiership winning team, kicking 3 goals.

Mitchell was selected by Port Adelaide with the 5th selection in the 2013 Rookie Draft. He was elevated from the Rookie List due to Nick Salter being placed on the long-term injury list, he made his debut in round 1 against Melbourne at the MCG as a substitute in the fourth quarter. He scored his first AFL goal against GWS in Round 2.

In 2015, he was promoted to Port's senior list. He was delisted by the club in October, but was re-drafted in the 2016 rookie draft.

Mitchell was delisted again at the conclusion of the 2016 season. Following his delisting, Mitchell took a year off to go travelling, returning to play for Claremont in 2018.
