= Jonathan O'Rourke =

Australian rules footballer (born 1994)

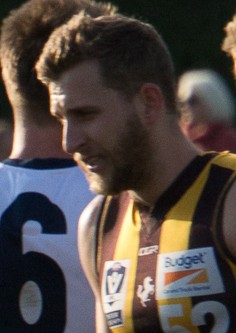
- O'Rourke playing for Box Hill in 2018

Personal information
- Full name: Jonathan O'Rourke
- Born: 21 April 1994 (age 32)
- Original team: Calder Cannons (TAC Cup)
- Draft: No. 2, 2012 national draft
- Debut: Round 16, 2013, Greater Western Sydney vs. Sydney, at Sydney Cricket Ground
- Height: 188 cm (6 ft 2 in)
- Weight: 74 kg (163 lb)
- Position: Midfielder

Playing career^{1}
| Years | Club | Games (Goals) |
| 2013–2014 | Greater Western Sydney | 9 (0) |
| 2015–2018 | Hawthorn | 12 (4) |
| Total | | 21 (4) |
- ^{1} Playing statistics correct to the end of 2018.

Career highlights
- VFL premiership player: 2018; Under 18 All-Australian team: 2012

Jonathan O'Rourke (born 21 April 1994) is a former professional Australian rules footballer who played for the Greater Western Sydney Giants and the Hawthorn Football Club in the Australian Football League.

== Junior career ==
O'Rourke was known as an inside midfielder with a hunger for contested football with good speed and endurance. A member of the Calder Cannons, O'Rourke was awarded 2012 All Australian honours following the NAB AFL Under-18 Championships.

== AFL career ==
=== Greater Western Sydney ===
O'Rourke was recruited by the Greater Western Sydney club in the 2012 national draft, with pick 2. His rookie year was blighted by injuries with hamstring problems and a broken jaw. O'Rourke made his debut in round 16, 2013, against Sydney at the Sydney Cricket Ground. O'Rourke spent the early part of the 2014 season playing for the Giants in the North East Australian Football League (NEAFL). When he managed to break into the Giants' AFL team he strung together seven successive games before again injuring his hamstring to miss the last game of the season.

=== Hawthorn ===
At the end of the 2014 season, he requested a trade back to Melbourne. He nominated Hawthorn as his club of choice and he was officially traded to Hawthorn in October.

O'Rourke spent most of the 2015 season developing in the VFL, he didn't miss a game all season which was a change from being injury ridden at the Giants.

O'Rourke's time since 2015 has been frustrated with a series of hamstring rated injuries. He missed the majority of 2017 with hamstring related injuries, injuring himself a week before the season then later on mid year.

O'Rourke was delisted at the end of the 2018 season. He signed to play with the Northern Blues in the Victorian Football League in 2019.

== Personal life ==
Growing up, O'Rourke supported the Richmond Football Club. He cites Roger Federer and Chris Judd as being among his sporting heroes.

== Statistics ==
Legend
| G | Goals | K | Kicks | D | Disposals | T | Tackles |
| B | Behinds | H | Handballs | M | Marks |

| Season | Team | No. | Games | Totals | | | | | | | Averages (per game) | | | | | | | Votes |
| Season | Team | No. | Games | G | B | K | H | D | M | T | G | B | K | H | D | M | T | Votes |
|---|---|---|---|---|---|---|---|---|---|---|---|---|---|---|---|---|---|---|
| 2013 | Greater Western Sydney | 24 | 1 | 0 | 0 | 5 | 2 | 7 | 2 | 3 | 0.0 | 0.0 | 5.0 | 2.0 | 7.0 | 2.0 | 3.0 | 0 |
| 2014 | Greater Western Sydney | 24 | 8 | 0 | 0 | 37 | 57 | 94 | 22 | 11 | 0.0 | 0.0 | 4.6 | 7.1 | 11.8 | 2.8 | 1.4 | 0 |
| 2015 | Hawthorn | 13 | 2 | 1 | 0 | 14 | 20 | 34 | 8 | 3 | 0.5 | 0.0 | 7.0 | 10.0 | 17.0 | 4.0 | 1.5 | 0 |
| 2016 | Hawthorn | 13 | 7 | 3 | 1 | 49 | 54 | 103 | 16 | 19 | 0.4 | 0.1 | 7.0 | 7.7 | 14.7 | 2.3 | 2.7 | 0 |
| 2017 | Hawthorn | 13 | 0 | — | — | — | — | — | — | — | — | — | — | — | — | — | — | 0 |
| 2018 | Hawthorn | 13 | 3 | 0 | 0 | 20 | 32 | 52 | 11 | 6 | 0.0 | 0.0 | 6.7 | 10.7 | 17.3 | 3.7 | 2.0 | 0 |
| Career | | | 21 | 4 | 1 | 125 | 165 | 290 | 59 | 42 | 0.2 | 0.0 | 6.0 | 7.9 | 13.8 | 2.8 | 2.0 | 0 |

== Honours and achievements ==
Team

- VFL premiership player (Box Hill): 2018
- Minor premiership (Box Hill): 2015

Individual

- Under 18 All-Australian team: 2012
