= Adam Carter (footballer) =

Australian rules footballer (born 1994)

Personal information
- Full name: Adam Harrison Carter
- Born: 17 April 1994 (age 32)
- Original team: South Fremantle (WAFL)
- Draft: No. 59, 2012 National Draft, West Coast
- Height: 179 cm (5 ft 10 in)
- Weight: 74 kg (163 lb)

Playing career^{1}
Years	Club	Games (Goals)
2013–2014	West Coast	7 (0)
- ^{1} Playing statistics correct to the end of 2014.

Adam Harrison Carter (born 17 April 1994) is a former professional Australian rules football player who was listed with the West Coast Eagles in the Australian Football League (AFL). He was recruited by the club in the 2012 National Draft, with pick #59. Carter made his debut in Round 16, 2013, against Fremantle at Subiaco Oval.

Carter was delisted at the conclusion of the 2014 AFL season.

He attended high school at Wesley College in South Perth.
