= Leigh Osborne =

Australian rules footballer

Personal information
- Full name: Leigh Osborne
- Born: 13 March 1990 (age 36)
- Original team: Frankston (VFL)
- Draft: No. 2, 2013 Rookie Draft, Gold Coast
- Height: 182 cm (6 ft 0 in)
- Weight: 81 kg (179 lb)

Playing career^{1}
| Years | Club | Games (Goals) |
| 2013 | Gold Coast | 1 (0) |
- ^{1} Playing statistics correct to the end of 2013.

Leigh Osborne (born 13 March 1990) is a professional Australian rules football player at the Gold Coast Football Club in the Australian Football League (AFL). He was recruited by the club in the 2013 Rookie Draft, with pick #2. Osborne made his debut in Round 22, 2013, against St Kilda at Docklands Stadium.

== Statistics ==
Legend
| G | Goals | K | Kicks | D | Disposals | T | Tackles |
| B | Behinds | H | Handballs | M | Marks |

| Season | Team | No. | Games | Totals | | | | | | | Averages (per game) | | | | | | |
| Season | Team | No. | Games | G | B | K | H | D | M | T | G | B | K | H | D | M | T |
|---|---|---|---|---|---|---|---|---|---|---|---|---|---|---|---|---|---|
| 2013 | Gold Coast | 41 | 1 | 0 | 0 | 4 | 5 | 9 | 3 | 1 | 0.0 | 0.0 | 4.0 | 5.0 | 9.0 | 3.0 | 1.0 |
| Career | | | 1 | 0 | 0 | 4 | 5 | 9 | 3 | 1 | 0.0 | 0.0 | 4.0 | 5.0 | 9.0 | 3.0 | 1.0 |
