= Nick Joyce =

English footballer

Personal information
- Full name: Nicholas John Joyce
- Date of birth: 27 July 1947 (age 79)
- Place of birth: Leeds, England
- Position: Winger

Senior career*
| Years | Team | Apps | (Gls) |
- Leeds Ashley Road
| 1971–1972 | Bradford City | 5 | (1) |
| Total | | 5 | (1) |
- * Club domestic league appearances and goals

Nicholas John Joyce (born 27 February 1947) is an English former professional footballer who played as a winger.

== Career ==
Born in Leeds, Joyce signed for Bradford City in August 1971 from Leeds Ashley Road, leaving the club in 1972 During his time with Bradford City he made five appearances in the Football League, scoring once.

== Sources ==
- Frost, Terry (1988). Bradford City A Complete Record 1903-1988. Breedon Books Sport. ISBN 0-907969-38-0.
