= Marco Paparone =

Australian rules footballer

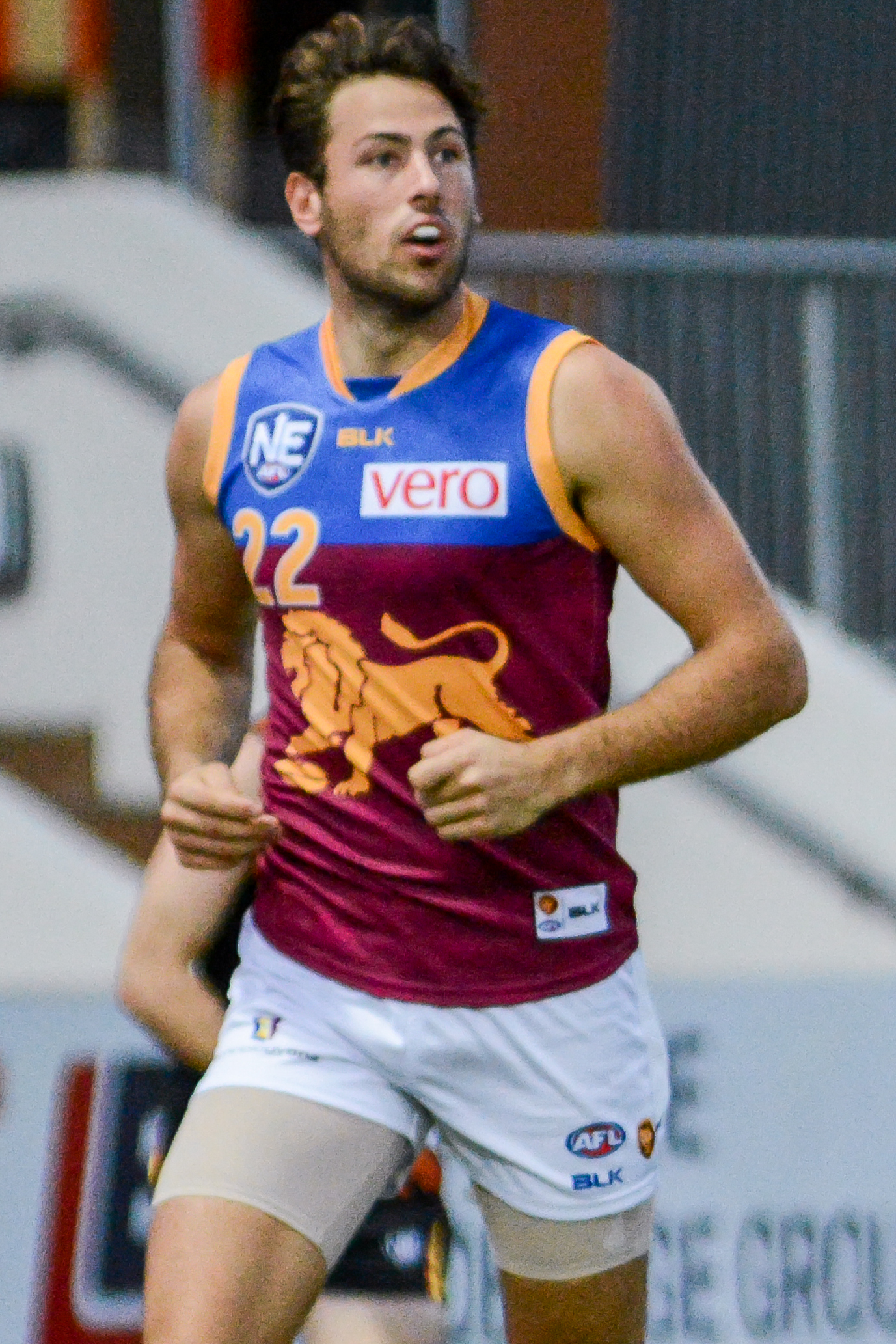
- Paparone playing for the Brisbane Lions reserves in June 2016

Personal information
- Full name: Marco Paparone
- Nickname: Paps
- Born: 3 September 1994 (age 32)
- Original team: East Fremantle colts (WAFL)
- Draft: No. 23, 2012 national draft
- Height: 194 cm (6 ft 4 in)
- Weight: 91 kg (14 st 5 lb; 201 lb)
- Position: Utility

Playing career^{1}
Years	Club	Games (Goals)
2013–2018	Brisbane Lions	55 (13)
- ^{1} Playing statistics correct to the end of 2018.

Career highlights
- NEAFL premiership player: 2013

Marco Paparone (born 3 September 1994) is a former Australian rules footballer who played for the Brisbane Lions in the Australian Football League (AFL). He was educated at John Curtin College of the Arts. He was drafted by the Brisbane Lions with their second selection and twenty-third overall in the 2012 national draft, having previously played with the East Fremantle colts in Western Australia. He made his debut in the sixty-three point loss against North Melbourne in round 4, 2013 at Etihad Stadium.

Paparone was delisted at the end of the 2018 season.
