= James Stewart (Australian footballer) =

Australian rules footballer (born 1994)

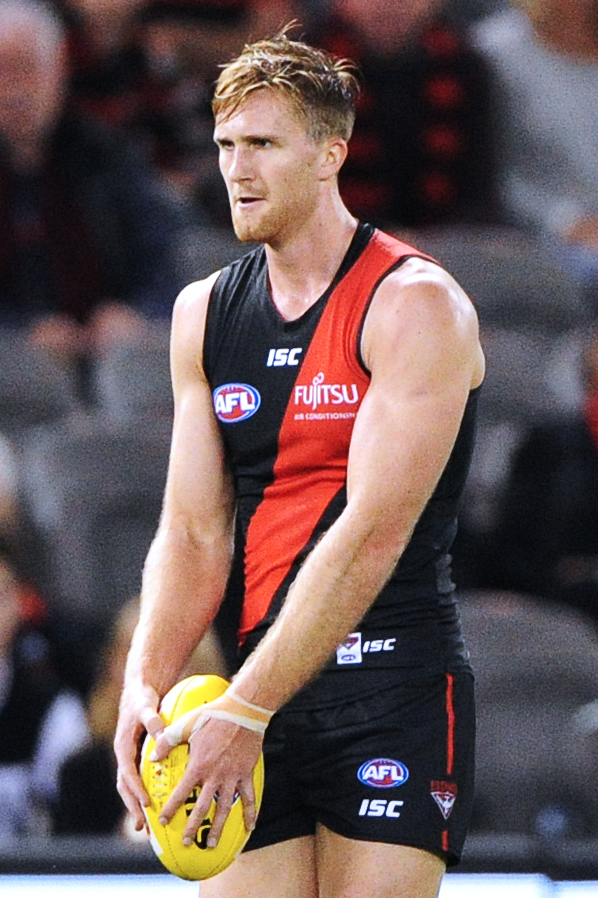
- Stewart playing for Essendon in April 2018

Personal information
- Full name: James Stewart
- Born: 4 March 1994 (age 32)
- Original team: Sandringham Dragons (TAC Cup)
- Draft: No. 27, 2012 national draft
- Height: 199 cm (6 ft 6 in)
- Weight: 99 kg (218 lb)
- Position: Key Defender, Key Forward

Club information
- Current club: Essendon
- Number: 17

Playing career^{1}
Years	Club	Games (Goals)
2013–2016	Greater Western Sydney	18 (18)
2017–2023	Essendon	60 (52)
Total		78 (70)
- ^{1} Playing statistics correct to the end of 2023.

James Stewart (born 4 March 1994) is a former professional Australian rules football player for the Essendon Football Club in the Australian Football League (AFL). He is the son of former Collingwood footballer, Craig Stewart.

Stewart played for the Sandringham Dragons in the TAC Cup, he was recruited by the Greater Western Sydney Giants with pick 27 in the 2012 national draft and made his debut in round 23, 2013, against Gold Coast at Metricon Stadium. He was traded to Essendon at the end of the 2016 season.

He collected ten disposals and kicked three goals in his debut for the club, in round 8 of the 2017 AFL season, helping them to a 17-point win over Geelong at the MCG.

Stewart is currently studying a Bachelor of Commerce/Arts at Deakin University.

== Statistics ==
Statistics are correct to the end of 2023

Legend
G	Goals	K	Kicks	D	Disposals	T	Tackles
B	Behinds	H	Handballs	M	Marks

Season	Team	No.	Games	Totals							Averages (per game)						
Season	Team	No.	Games	G	B	K	H	D	M	T	G	B	K	H	D	M	T
2013	Greater Western Sydney	36	1	0	0	1	1	2	1	1	0.0	0.0	1.0	1.0	2.0	1.0	1.0
2014	Greater Western Sydney	36	3	3	4	24	10	34	9	3	1.0	1.3	8.0	3.3	11.3	3.0	1.0
2015	Greater Western Sydney	36	13	15	14	78	52	130	42	25	1.2	1.1	6.0	4.0	10.0	3.2	1.9
2016	Greater Western Sydney	36	1	0	1	2	2	4	2	0	0.0	1.0	2.0	2.0	4.0	2.0	0.0
2017	Essendon	17	16	22	16	114	82	196	69	34	1.4	1.0	7.1	5.1	12.3	4.3	2.1
2018	Essendon	17	11	15	13	83	55	138	55	17	1.4	1.2	7.6	5.0	12.6	5.0	1.6
2019	Essendon	17	0	–	–	–	–	–	–	–	–	–	–	–	–	–	–
2020 (Note: The 2020 season was played with 17 home-and-away matches per team (down from 22) and 16-minute quarters with time on (down from 20-minute quarters with time on) due to the impact of the COVID-19 pandemic.)	Essendon	17	10	11	4	50	25	75	33	10	1.1	0.4	5.0	2.5	7.5	3.3	1.0
2021	Essendon	17	17	0	0	136	77	213	89	19	0.0	0.0	8.0	4.5	12.5	5.2	1.1
2022	Essendon	17	6	4	0	33	18	51	21	6	0.7	0.0	5.5	3.0	8.5	3.5	1.0
2023	Essendon	17	0	–	–	–	–	–	–	–	–	–	–	–	–	–	–
Career			78	70	52	521	322	843	321	115	0.9	0.7	6.7	4.1	10.8	4.1	1.5
