= Brett Goodes =

Australian rules footballer

Personal information
- Full name: Brett Goodes
- Born: 17 February 1984 (age 42)
- Original teams: Williamstown Football Club, (VFL)
- Draft: No. 4, 2013 Rookie Draft (Western Bulldogs)
- Height: 183 cm (6 ft 0 in)
- Weight: 89 kg (14 st 0 lb; 196 lb)

Playing career^{1}
Years	Club	Games (Goals)
2003	Port Adelaide (SANFL)	1 (0)
2013–2015	Western Bulldogs	22 (4)
Total		23 (4)
- ^{1} Playing statistics correct to the end of 2015.

Career highlights
- VFL premiership player: 2014; Norm Goss Memorial Medal: 2014

Brett Goodes (born 17 February 1984) is a former professional Australian rules footballer who played for the Western Bulldogs in the Australian Football League (AFL). He is the younger brother of Sydney Swans dual Brownlow Medalist Adam Goodes.

Goodes played for North Ballarat in the Victorian Football League (VFL), Port Adelaide in the South Australian National Football League (SANFL) and NT Thunder in the Queensland Australian Football League (QAFL) before accepting a job with the Western Bulldogs as a player development manager. Whilst at the club, he played in the Bulldogs VFL reserves squad, Williamstown. Goodes played 40 games and kicked 27 goals for the VFL Seagulls in 2011 & 2012, including the 2011 VFL grand final loss to Port Melbourne. He finished in third place in the Club best and fairest award in both seasons and was awarded the best player in the finals in 2011.

At the end of the 2012 season, he was invited to train with the Bulldogs senior team, and was selected with the club's first draft pick in the 2013 Rookie Draft.

== AFL career ==
He made his AFL debut for the Bulldogs in the opening round of the 2013 season against Brisbane Lions at Etihad Stadium. In the Round 2 match against Fremantle, he was amongst the best players afield. After a promising first year, Goodes struggled for form in the 2014 season, playing predominantly in the club's VFL reserves team, where he won the Best and Fairest.

Goodes was delisted at the conclusion of the 2014 AFL season, but was re-drafted by the Bulldogs in the 2014 rookie draft, and was elevated to the senior list prior to the club's 2015 opening round clash against West Coast.

He was delisted at the conclusion of the 2015 AFL season.

== Statistics ==
Statistics are correct to the end of the 2015 season

Legend
G	Goals	K	Kicks	D	Disposals	T	Tackles
B	Behinds	H	Handballs	M	Marks

Season	Team	No.	Games	Totals							Averages (per game)						
Season	Team	No.	Games	G	B	K	H	D	M	T	G	B	K	H	D	M	T
2013	Western Bulldogs	44	13	2	1	169	101	270	66	34	0.2	0.1	13.0	7.8	20.8	5.1	2.6
2014	Western Bulldogs	44	2	0	0	15	6	21	6	3	0.0	0.0	7.5	3.0	10.5	3.0	1.5
2015	Western Bulldogs	44	7	2	1	53	31	84	17	21	0.3	0.1	7.6	4.4	12.0	2.7	3.0
Career			22	4	2	237	138	375	89	58	0.2	0.1	12.3	7.1	19.4	4.8	2.5
