= Craig Stewart (Australian footballer) =

Australian rules footballer (1956–2023)

Personal information
- Full name: Craig Forbes Stewart
- Born: 15 September 1956
- Died: 8 June 2023 (aged 66); Melbourne
- Original team: Preston (VFA)
- Height: 193 cm (6 ft 4 in)
- Weight: 99 kg (218 lb)
- Position: Ruckman / forward

Playing career^{1}
Years	Club	Games (Goals)
1978–1983	Collingwood	115 (122)
1984–1986	Richmond	35 (3)
Total		150 (125)
- ^{1} Playing statistics correct to the end of 1986.

Craig Forbes Stewart (15 September 1956 – 8 June 2023) was an Australian rules footballer who played for the Collingwood Football Club and Richmond Football Club in the Victorian Football League (VFL). He is the father of James Stewart, who plays for the Essendon Football Club.

Stewart started out in the VFA with Preston, topping their goal-kicking in 1976 and winning their best and fairest award in 1977. He joined Collingwood in 1978 and went on to play 115 games for the club, including the 1980 and 1981 grand finals, which they lost. When not playing in the ruck, he was used up forward; he kicked 32 goals in 1979.

Stewart died on 8 June 2023 at the age of 66.
