= Nathan Hrovat =

Australian rules footballer

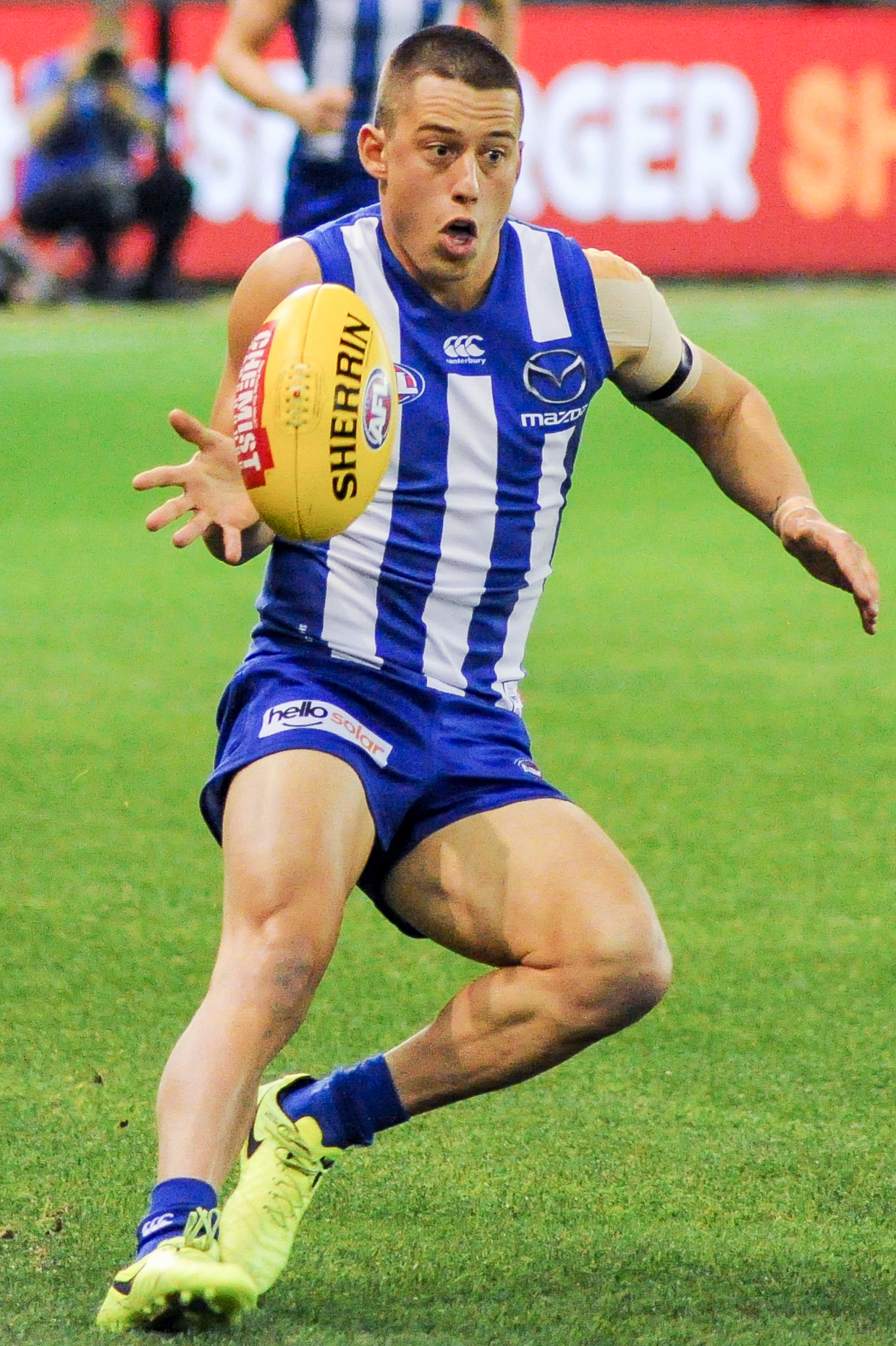
- Hrovat playing for North Melbourne in June 2017

Personal information
- Full name: Nathan Hrovat
- Born: 7 June 1994 (age 32)
- Original team: Northern Knights (TAC Cup)/Carey Grammar
- Draft: No. 21, 2012 National Draft, Western Bulldogs
- Height: 175 cm (5 ft 9 in)
- Weight: 78 kg (172 lb)
- Position: Midfielder/Forward

Playing career^{1}
| Years | Club | Games (Goals) |
| 2013–2016 | Western Bulldogs | 30 (14) |
| 2017–2019 | North Melbourne | 39 (21) |
| Total | | 69 (35) |
- ^{1} Playing statistics correct to the end of 2019.

Career highlights
- 2014 AFL Rising Star nominee

Nathan Hrovat (born 7 June 1994) is a former Australian rules footballer who most recently played in the Australian Football League (AFL) for the North Melbourne Football Club. He previously played for the Western Bulldogs from 2013 to 2016. He was recruited by the Western Bulldogs in the 2012 National Draft, with pick #21. Hrovat made his debut in Round 9, 2013, against St Kilda at Docklands Stadium. In round 17, 2014 Hrovat gathered 25 disposals and was awarded the Rising Star nomination. At the conclusion of the 2016 season, he was traded to North Melbourne. Hrovat was delisted by North Melbourne at the conclusion of the 2019 season. Hrovat is now playing for Greensborough.
