= Dylan Roberton =

Australian rules footballer

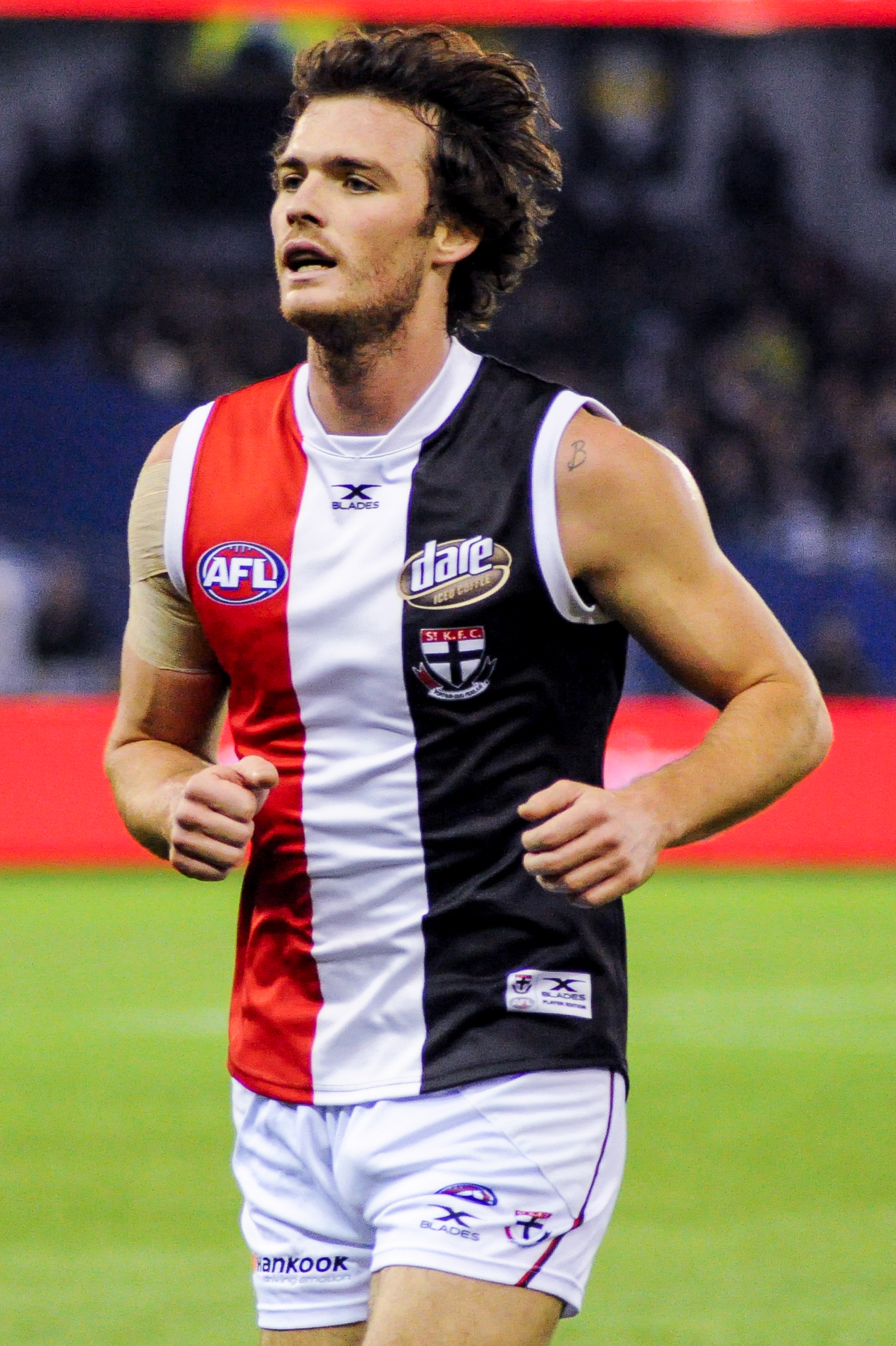
- Roberton playing for St Kilda in June 2017

Personal information
- Full name: Dylan Roberton
- Born: 21 June 1991 (age 35)
- Original team: Dandenong Stingrays (TAC Cup)
- Draft: No. 49, 2009 National Draft, Fremantle
- Height: 194 cm (6 ft 4 in)
- Weight: 88 kg (194 lb)
- Position: Defender

Playing career^{1}
Years	Club	Games (Goals)
2010–2012	Fremantle	37 (5)
2013–2020	St Kilda	92 (15)
Total		129 (20)
- ^{1} Playing statistics correct to the end of 2020.

Dylan Roberton (born 21 June 1991) is a former Australian rules footballer who played for the Fremantle and St Kilda Football Club in the Australian Football League (AFL). He was selected with the 49th selection in the 2009 AFL National Draft from the Dandenong Stingrays in the TAC Cup by Fremantle.

== Playing career ==
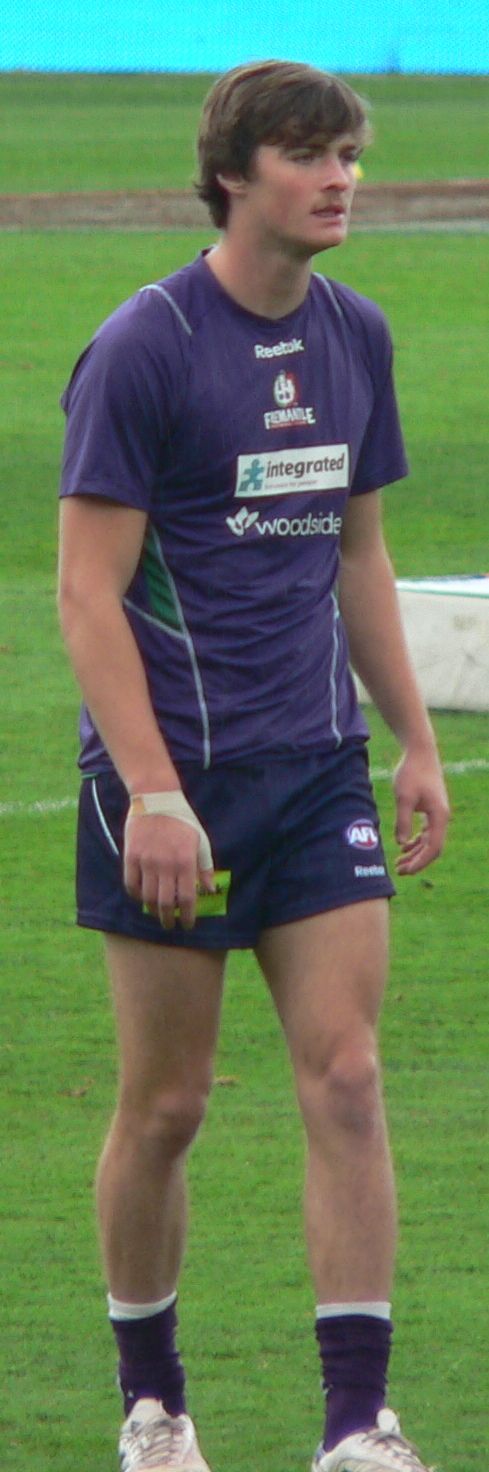
Roberton played for Fremantle between 2010 and 2012

=== Career with Fremantle (2010–12) ===
Roberton started the 2010 season playing for East Perth in the WAFL and was named to make his AFL debut for Fremantle in the Round 6 Western Derby.

In 2011 he was used as Fremantle's first ever substitute player in their opening round match against the Brisbane Lions, replacing Rhys Palmer in the third quarter.

=== Career with St Kilda (2013–2021) ===
At the end of the 2012 season, Roberton requested a trade from the Dockers to a Melbourne-based team. When a trade did not eventuate he was delisted by Fremantle and then invited to train with St Kilda. He was signed as a "delisted free agent" on 30 November 2012 by the Saints.

In 2017, Roberton was named in the 40-man All-Australian team squad as one of the best rebounding defenders in the league. Roberton also capped a brilliant season, finishing second in the Trevor Barker Award. He also extended his contract for another four years, until the end of the 2021 season.

In Round 4 2018, Roberton collapsed on the field in a game against Geelong at Kardinia Park. It was determined that Roberton was suffering from a heart condition, and he was unable to retake the field. Roberton’s heart rate had soared to around 300 beats per minute which is more than 100 beats per minute beyond the max heart rate of a person of his age. Roberton ultimately did not return to football in 2018. In a pre-season game in 2019 in Ballarat, Roberton felt unwell and missed the rest of the match. He did not play the 2019 season.

Roberton returned to the leadership group ahead of the 2020 season. Roberton played in the Saints' Round 1 clash against North Melbourne, his first AFL-level game since his collapse in 2018. However, Roberton did not play at AFL level again in 2020 following the resumption of the season following the Coronavirus hiatus from April to June.

In early January 2021 defender Roberton announced he was taking a break from his footballing duties to consider his future in football. Roberton has been attempting to make a full return to football following a collapse as a result of a heart condition in Round 4 2018. Roberton ultimately announced his retirement from the game on 6 March, stating that "I've come to a point where I need to put my family and future first...after lengthy discussions with my family and on the advice of my doctors, I've made the extremely hard decision to hang up the boots."

== Coaching ==
Roberton was appointed the forwards coach of the Western Bulldogs' AFLW team in October 2021.

== Personal life ==
In January 2013, it was revealed that a major reason for Roberton wanting to return to Victoria was to be closer to his and his partner Amy's families. The couple's first son, named Boston, was born in November 2012. Roberton's second son was born in June 2014, and a daughter was born in June 2015.
