= Sam Colquhoun =

Australian rules footballer

Personal information
- Full name: Sam Angus Colquhoun
- Born: 20 December 1994 (age 31); Adelaide
- Original team: Central District (SANFL) angaston football club
- Draft: No. 3, 2013 Pre-season Draft: Port Adelaide
- Height: 179 cm (5 ft 10 in)
- Weight: 72 kg (159 lb)
- Position: Defender

Playing career^{1}
Years	Club	Games (Goals)
2013–2016	Port Adelaide	16 (3)
- ^{1} Playing statistics correct to the end of 2016.

Sam Colquhoun (born 20 December 1994) is a former professional Australian rules footballer who played for the Port Adelaide Football Club in the Australian Football League (AFL).

Colquhoun was South Australia's Most Valuable Player and an All-Australian at the 2012 AFL Under 18 Championships. He was then invited to train with Port Adelaide and Essendon prior to the 2013 Pre-season Draft, Port committed to selecting him with their sole pick, the team he supported growing up. He made his debut for Port Adelaide in Round Seven 2013, against Richmond. He had a solid Finals series in 2013, providing trustworthy disposals off half back against Collingwood and Geelong.

Colquhoun had a tough 2014. He struggled for game time in the pre-season and was left out of the round one team. He then played a handful of games for the Magpies before injuring his knee and requiring a full reconstruction ending his season.

After recovering from a knee reconstruction in 2014, Sam had a solid year in 2015, playing 6 games at AFL level and showing his consistency at SANFL level. He played 14 games at SANFL level, averaging 21 touches and 3 tackles a game. He was promoted to the AFL lineup against Geelong and played 6 of the next 8 matches. His best games came against Sydney and Carlton, before heading back to the SANFL for the finals.

Colquhoun was delisted at the conclusion of the 2016 season.
