= Bret Thornton =

Australian rules footballer (born 1983)

Personal information
- Born: 15 November 1983 (age 42)
- Original team: Mount Waverley Blues (Vic)/Oakleigh Chargers
- Draft: No. 11, 2002 rookie draft
- Height: 192 cm (6 ft 4 in)
- Weight: 94 kg (207 lb)
- Position: Defender

Playing career
| Years | Club | Games (Goals) |
| 2002–2012 | Carlton | 188 (30) |
| 2013 | Greater Western Sydney | 1 (0) |
| Total | | 189 (30) |

Bret Thornton (born 15 November 1983) is a former professional Australian rules footballer who played for the Carlton Football Club and Greater Western Sydney Giants in the Australian Football League (AFL).

== Early life and junior career ==
Thornton grew up in the Melbourne suburb of Mount Waverley and attended Mount Waverley Secondary College.

As a junior, he played for the Mount Waverley Blues Junior Football Club, before being selected to play for the Oakleigh Chargers in the TAC Cup.

== AFL career ==
He made his debut with Carlton in Round 10, 2002, against Fremantle after being elevated from the rookie list that year.

Thornton was an important part of the Carlton backline since his debut in 2002. The retirements of Stephen Silvagni, Michael Sexton and Ang Christou over a two-year period saw a major gap left in the Carlton defence, and the young Thornton quickly found himself forced to try to fill that hole. Over the next few years, constantly defending against top forwards with more experience, Thornton developed into an important and reliable defender for the club.

With the development of Carlton's backline through the mid-2000s, Thornton's role became more variable. He still played full-back when required, with reasonable capability against both leading and tall marking forwards, but Carlton benefitted significantly when he was able to push up the ground and direct play from centre half-back. He played every game in 2006, and played his 100th game in 2007, becoming the ninth-youngest Carlton player to achieve the milestone.

Hawthorn has been particularly keen to acquire Thonton's services. They expressed interest in trading for the out-of-contract Thornton for the 2007 season, and Thornton similarly named Hawthorn as his preferred destination for 2007. Carlton refused to agree to a trade, stating that Thornton was a required player at the club. After no trade was made, Thornton re-signed with Carlton on 14 October 2006 for a three-year deal. Hawthorn again expressed an interest in trading for Thornton for the 2008 season, but Carlton again refused.

In 2010, the increasing strength of Carlton's backline saw Thornton start to struggle for selection for the first time in his career. He played twelve matches for the year, and was occasionally moved into the forward-line. In 2011, he returned to Carlton's best 22, playing more often in the forward-line, and kicked thirteen goals for the season.

On 7 September 2012, Thornton left the Blues in hopes of trying his luck at another side in 2013. He was picked up by Greater Western Sydney with the first selection in the 2013 Pre-Season Draft, but played only one game for the Giants and was delisted on 4 September 2013.

Thornton currently plays for Deer Park in the Western Region Football League.
