= Taylor Garner =

Australian rules footballer (born 1994)

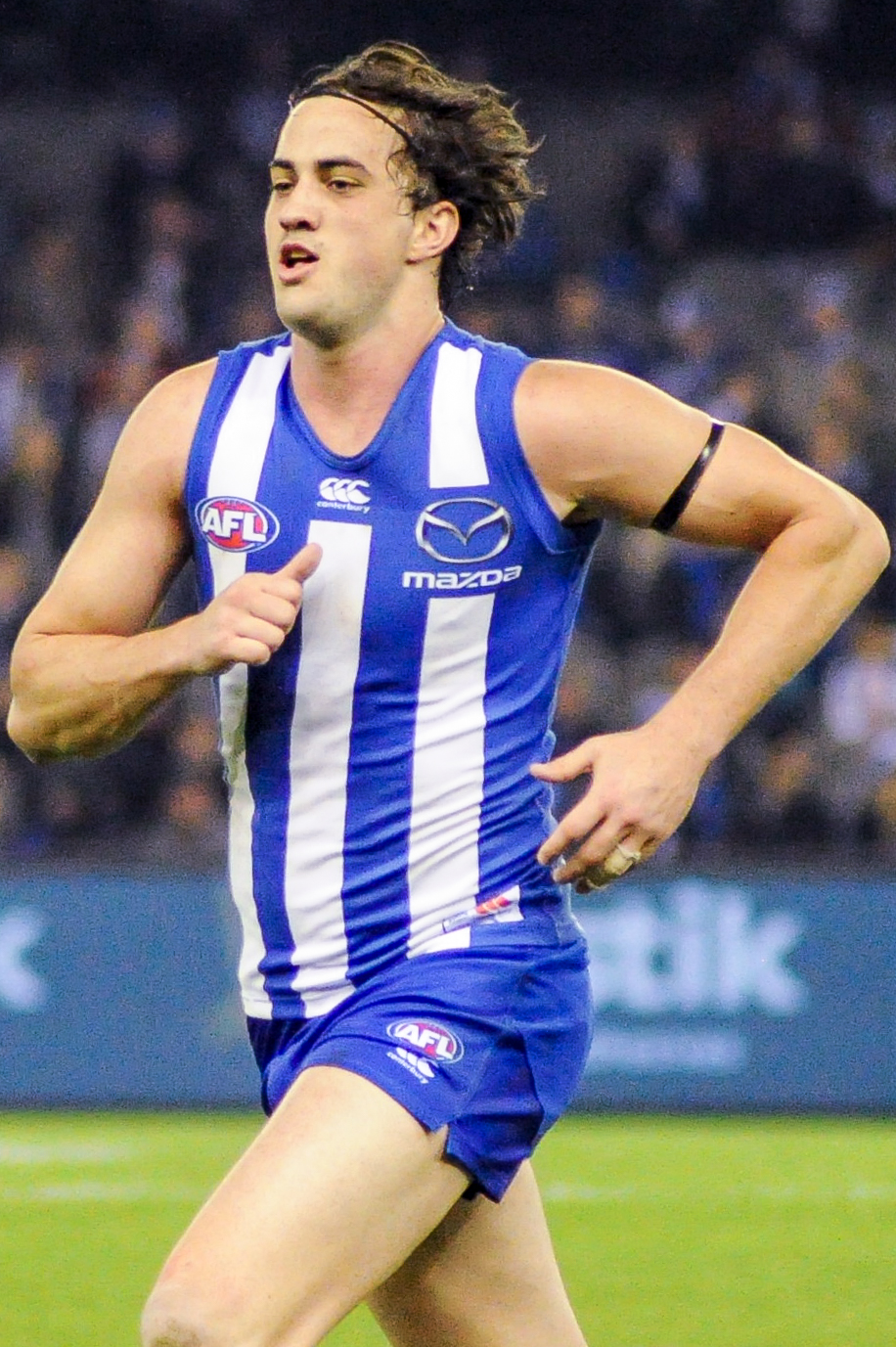
- Garner playing for North Melbourne in June 2017

Personal information
- Full name: Taylor Garner
- Born: 8 January 1994 (age 32)
- Original team: Dandenong Stingrays (TAC Cup)
- Draft: No. 15, 2012 national draft
- Height: 188 cm (6 ft 2 in)
- Weight: 88 kg (194 lb)
- Position: Forward/Midfielder

Playing career^{1}
| Years | Club | Games (Goals) |
| 2013–2021 | North Melbourne | 49 (37) |
- ^{1} Playing statistics correct to the end of 2021.

Taylor Garner (born 8 January 1994) is a former professional Australian rules footballer who played for the North Melbourne Football Club in the Australian Football League (AFL). He was drafted to North Melbourne with pick 15 in the 2012 AFL national draft after playing for the Dandenong Stingrays in the TAC Cup and representing Victoria Country at the 2011 AFL Under 18 Championships. He made his debut in Round 20, 2013, against the Adelaide Crows.

== AFL career ==
Garner debuted as a sub against Adelaide in round 20 of 2013. He made his first start in North's final game of that season against Collingwood at the MCG. In a 2014 Nab Challenge fixture against Geelong at Kardinia Park, Garner suffered a debilitating hamstring injury. He would miss the entire 2014 season after suffering setbacks in addition to unrelated hip injuries.

Garner's injury troubles continued into the start of the 2015 season. Once he was eventually cleared of his hamstring and hip concerns, Garner subsequently sustained a broken finger injury, further delaying his return. After a short stint in the VFL, Garner was a shock inclusion in North Melbourne's round 15 game against Geelong. Garner was selected as sub and came on to score two goals. Garner kept his place in the senior side for the rest of the season including during North's finals series. In the first elimination final against Richmond, in front of 90,168 people, Garner kicked an important goal. Late in the match he was subbed out for Lindsay Thomas, and North won the match. Garner also played in the subsequent semi-final win against Sydney, and preliminary final loss against West Coast at Subiaco. In 2017 Garner was also nominated for mark of the year in a game against Fremantle.

After eight years at North Melbourne, Garner was delisted at the conclusion of the 2021 AFL season.
