= Tom Lee (footballer, born 1991) =

Australian rules footballer

Personal information
- Full name: Thomas Lee
- Born: 2 January 1991 (age 35)
- Original team: Claremont (WAFL)
- Draft: No. 60, 2008 national draft
- Height: 194 cm (6 ft 4 in)
- Weight: 91 kg (201 lb)
- Position: Defender

Playing career^{1}
Years	Club	Games (Goals)
2008	Adelaide	0 (0)
2013–2016	St Kilda	17 (18)
- ^{1} Playing statistics correct to the end of 2016.

Career highlights
- WAFL premiership player: 2011, 2012; Claremont Best & Fairest: 2012; Claremont Leading Goal Kicker: 2012, 2018, 2019

Tom Lee (born 2 January 1991) is a former professional Australian rules footballer who played for the St Kilda Football Club in the Australian Football League (AFL). He was also listed with the Adelaide Football Club, however, he did not play a senior match.

== Career ==
=== Adelaide (2008) ===
Lee was drafted by Adelaide in 2008 AFL draft from Claremont in the West Australian Football League (WAFL). He returned to Claremont at the end of the 2009 season having not made his AFL debut.

=== Claremont (2009–2012) ===
In 2011 and 2012, Lee played in Claremont's WAFL premiership side. He was named the best player on the ground in Claremont's 2012 Foxtel Cup victory over Werribee.

=== St Kilda (2013–2016) ===
Lee was then recruited by St Kilda prior to the 2013 season, via a trade deal with Greater Western Sydney, who had the recruiting rights to all formerly listed players. In Round 3, 2013, he played his first game for St Kilda against Greater Western Sydney. At the conclusion of the 2016 season, he was delisted by St Kilda.
