= Troy Chaplin =

Australian rules footballer

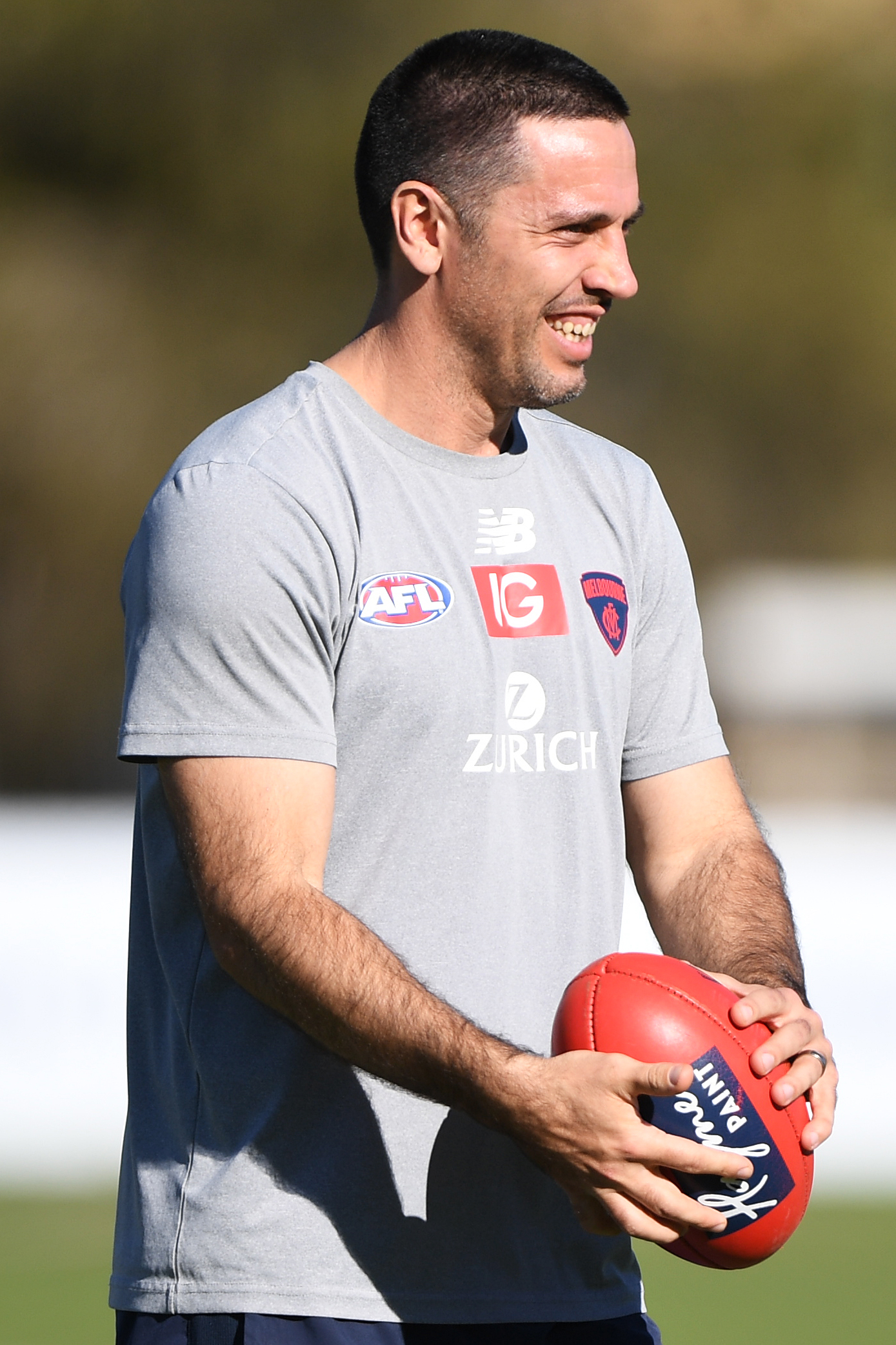
- Chaplin in July 2019

Personal information
- Full name: Troy David Chaplin
- Born: 23 February 1986 (age 40); Maryborough, Victoria
- Original teams: Maryborough Rovers (MCDFL); North Ballarat Rebels (TAC Cup)
- Draft: 15th overall, 2003 national draft
- Height: 195 cm (6 ft 5 in)
- Weight: 100 kg (220 lb)
- Position: Defender

Playing career
| Years | Club | Games (Goals) |
| 2004–2012 | Port Adelaide | 140 (10) |
| 2013–2016 | Richmond | 75 (5) |
| Total | | 215 (15) |

Coaching career
| Years | Club | Games (W–L–D) |
| 2025 | Melbourne | 3 (0–3–0) |

Career highlights
- AFL Assistant Coach of the Year: 2022

Troy David Chaplin (born 23 February 1986) is a former professional Australian rules footballer who played for the Port Adelaide Football Club and Richmond Football Club in the Australian Football League (AFL). He has served as the offensive coordinator and a caretaker coach at the Melbourne Football Club.

== Playing career ==
Chaplin played for the Maryborough Rovers Football Club and was drafted by Port Adelaide from North Ballarat Rebels at selection 15 in the 2003 AFL draft.

The then 18-year-old left footer debuted in 2004 in Round 4 against Melbourne and played eight matches in 2005. He suffered a fractured left eye socket in round one of 2006, but found consistency and collected 20 or more possessions four times that season.

Standing 196 cm tall, Troy was also a champion basketballer and was a member of the Victorian Under 18 basketball team.

He was nominated for the 2006 NAB Rising Star award in Round 16 of that season.

A restricted free agent at the completion of the 2012 season, Chaplin was made a four year offer by the Richmond Football Club, one which Port Adelaide chose not to match.

In July 2016, Chaplin announced his immediate retirement from the AFL.

== Coaching career ==
In the later stages of his playing career, Chaplin moved into the football coaching space, initially working as a development coach at Oakleigh Chargers and Sturt before being selected to the position of assistant coach at the Melbourne Football Club in October 2016. Chaplin was appointed caretaker senior coach of Melbourne for the final three games of the 2025 season, after the club parted ways with senior coach Simon Goodwin. On August 8, 2025, Chaplin announced he would not re-apply for the senior coaching position at Melbourne Football Club at the end of the 2025 AFL season. At the end of the 2025 AFL season, Chaplin was replaced by Steven King as senior coach of Melbourne Football Club, but Chaplin still remained at the Melbourne Football Club as assistant coach under senior coach Steven King.

== Statistics ==
Legend
| G | Goals | K | Kicks | D | Disposals | T | Tackles |
| B | Behinds | H | Handballs | M | Marks |

| Season | Team | No. | Games | Totals | | | | | | | Averages (per game) | | | | | | |
| Season | Team | No. | Games | G | B | K | H | D | M | T | G | B | K | H | D | M | T |
|---|---|---|---|---|---|---|---|---|---|---|---|---|---|---|---|---|---|
| 2004 | Port Adelaide | 30 | 1 | 0 | 0 | 2 | 1 | 3 | 3 | 0 | 0.0 | 0.0 | 2.0 | 1.0 | 3.0 | 3.0 | 0.0 |
| 2005 | Port Adelaide | 30 | 8 | 0 | 0 | 55 | 58 | 113 | 40 | 8 | 0.0 | 0.0 | 6.9 | 7.3 | 14.1 | 5.0 | 1.0 |
| 2006 | Port Adelaide | 30 | 19 | 2 | 1 | 155 | 133 | 288 | 103 | 24 | 0.1 | 0.1 | 8.2 | 7.0 | 15.2 | 5.4 | 1.3 |
| 2007 | Port Adelaide | 30 | 14 | 3 | 0 | 110 | 136 | 246 | 87 | 22 | 0.2 | 0.0 | 7.9 | 9.7 | 17.6 | 6.2 | 1.6 |
| 2008 | Port Adelaide | 30 | 19 | 2 | 1 | 146 | 159 | 305 | 89 | 27 | 0.1 | 0.1 | 7.7 | 8.4 | 16.1 | 4.7 | 1.4 |
| 2009 | Port Adelaide | 30 | 20 | 2 | 1 | 184 | 176 | 360 | 120 | 41 | 0.1 | 0.1 | 9.2 | 8.8 | 18.0 | 6.0 | 2.1 |
| 2010 | Port Adelaide | 30 | 20 | 0 | 0 | 240 | 137 | 377 | 108 | 49 | 0.0 | 0.0 | 12.0 | 6.9 | 18.9 | 5.4 | 2.5 |
| 2011 | Port Adelaide | 30 | 21 | 1 | 3 | 204 | 137 | 341 | 115 | 50 | 0.0 | 0.1 | 9.7 | 6.5 | 16.2 | 5.5 | 2.4 |
| 2012 | Port Adelaide | 30 | 18 | 0 | 1 | 179 | 96 | 275 | 106 | 37 | 0.0 | 0.1 | 9.9 | 5.3 | 15.3 | 5.9 | 2.1 |
| 2013 | Richmond | 25 | 22 | 1 | 1 | 179 | 129 | 308 | 130 | 35 | 0.0 | 0.0 | 8.1 | 5.9 | 14.0 | 5.9 | 1.6 |
| 2014 | Richmond | 25 | 23 | 2 | 1 | 171 | 172 | 343 | 106 | 35 | 0.1 | 0.0 | 7.4 | 7.5 | 14.9 | 4.6 | 1.5 |
| 2015 | Richmond | 25 | 22 | 1 | 0 | 209 | 123 | 332 | 137 | 34 | 0.0 | 0.0 | 9.5 | 5.6 | 15.1 | 6.2 | 1.5 |
| 2016 | Richmond | 25 | 8 | 1 | 2 | 62 | 37 | 99 | 36 | 15 | 0.1 | 0.3 | 7.8 | 4.6 | 12.4 | 4.5 | 1.9 |
| Career | | | 215 | 15 | 11 | 1896 | 1494 | 3390 | 1180 | 377 | 0.1 | 0.1 | 8.8 | 6.9 | 15.8 | 5.5 | 1.8 |
