= Matthew McDonough (footballer) =

Australian rules footballer (born 1994)

Personal information
- Full name: Matthew McDonough
- Nickname: Plugg
- Born: 26 January 1994 (age 32)
- Original team: Woodville-West Torrens (SANFL)/West Gambier Football Club
- Draft: 42nd overall 2012 AFL National Draft, Richmond
- Height: 180 cm (5 ft 11 in)
- Weight: 85 kg (187 lb)
- Position: Midfielder / half-forward / backline

Playing career^{1}
Years	Club	Games (Goals)
2013–2015	Richmond	10 (1)
- ^{1} Playing statistics correct to the end of 2015.

Matthew McDonough (born 26 January 1994) is a former professional Australian rules footballer who played for the Richmond Football Club in the Australian Football League (AFL). Lockleys premiership player 2020.

He was drafted by Richmond with pick 42 in the 2012 national draft. He made his debut in round 21 of the 2013 AFL season, as a late replacement for Matthew White. He was delisted at the conclusion of the 2015 season.
