= Jackson Thurlow =

Australian rules footballer (born 1994)

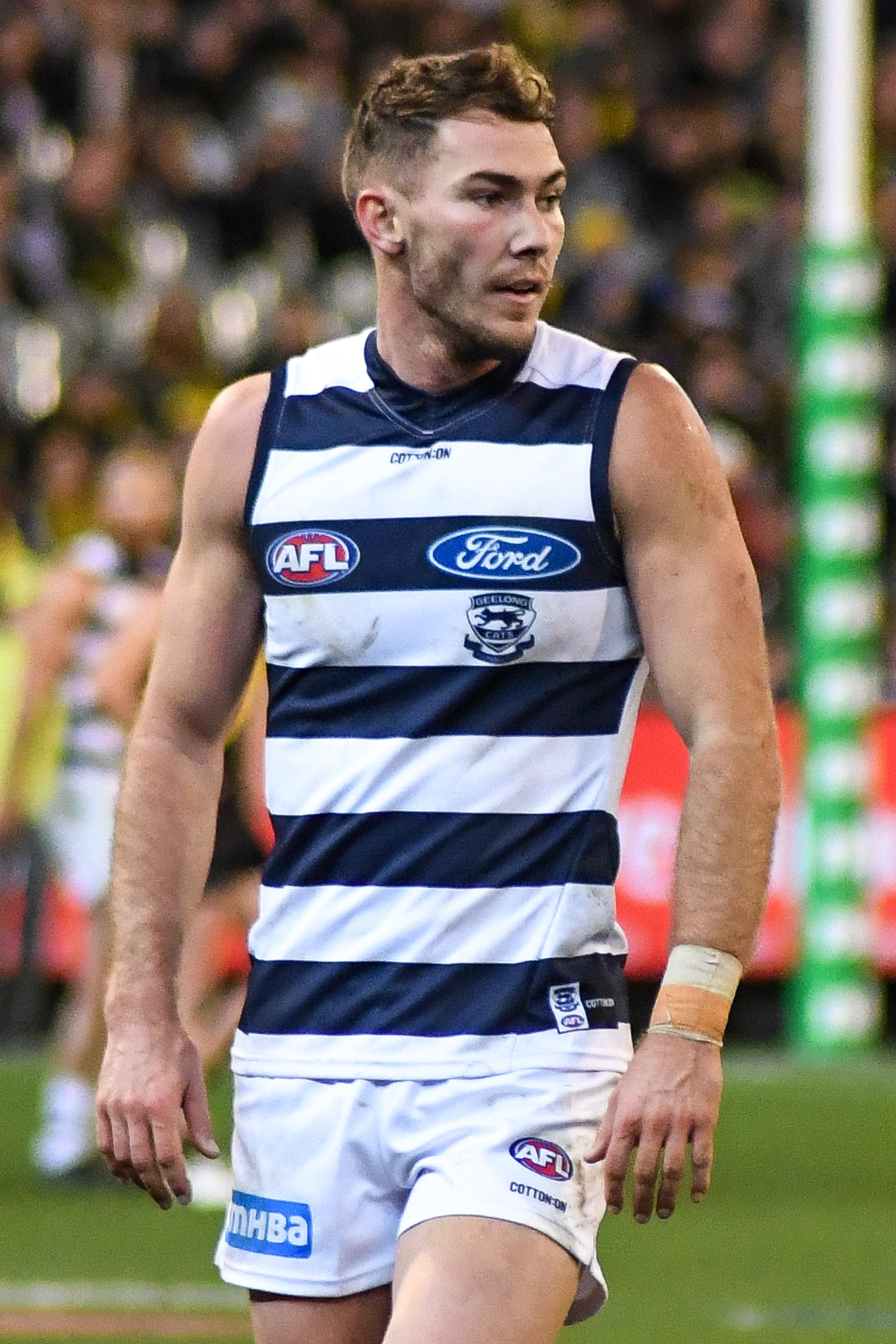
- Thurlow in 2018

Personal information
- Born: 28 March 1994 (age 32); Launceston, Tasmania
- Original team: Launceston Football Club (TFL)
- Draft: No. 16, 2012 AFL draft
- Debut: Round 7, 2013, Geelong vs. Essendon, at Docklands Stadium
- Height: 190 cm (6 ft 3 in)
- Weight: 83 kg (183 lb)
- Position: Defender

Playing career^{1}
Years	Club	Games (Goals)
2013–2018	Geelong	46 (11)
2019–2020	Sydney	17 (3)
Total		63 (14)
- ^{1} Playing statistics correct to the end of 2020.

Career highlights
- 2015 AFL Rising Star nominee

Jackson Thurlow (born 28 March 1994) is a former Australian rules footballer who played for the Geelong Football Club and the Sydney Swans in the Australian Football League (AFL).

Thurlow is from Launceston, Tasmania and played for Launceston Football Club growing up, notably in their 2011 Tasmanian Football League premiership. He played for his state in the 2012 AFL Under 18 Championships – averaging 6.6 marks and 24.6 disposals – and was named in the under-18 All-Australian side. Thurlow was drafted by Geelong with pick 16 in the 2012 AFL national draft, their first selection. He wore number 40 while at the club.

Thurlow made his debut in round 7 of the 2013 AFL season against Essendon at Docklands Stadium, recording five marks, 17 possessions and three tackles. He played four games for the season. In 2014, Thurlow played six matches, including two finals, before suffering a lacerated kidney during the 2015 pre-season which hospitalised him for six days. He returned to Tasmania for seven weeks to recover and missed Geelong's first two games. In 2015, Thurlow played 19 games in a breakout season and signed a three-year contract extension, tying him to Geelong until 2018. He was nominated for the 2015 AFL Rising Star in round 19 after his game against Sydney. During the 2016 NAB Challenge, Thurlow tore his anterior cruciate ligament (ACL), causing him to miss the 2016 season. In 2017 and 2018, Thurlow played 17 matches in total.

At the conclusion of the 2018 season, Thurlow was traded to the Sydney Swans.

Thurlow would play his first game for the Sydney Swans in round 3 of the 2019 AFL season. Thurlow would go onto play 17 games for Sydney before being delisted at the conclusion of to 2020.

In 2021 it was announced that Thurlow had earned a spot on the Geelong Cats VFL side and Thurlow would return to Geeelong.

== Statistics ==
Statistics are correct to the end of 2018.

Legend
G	Goals	K	Kicks	D	Disposals	T	Tackles
B	Behinds	H	Handballs	M	Marks

Season	Team	No.	Games	Totals							Averages (per game)						
Season	Team	No.	Games	G	B	K	H	D	M	T	G	B	K	H	D	M	T
2013	Geelong	40	4	1	1	31	29	60	15	9	0.3	0.3	7.8	7.3	15.0	3.8	2.3
2014	Geelong	40	6	3	1	31	18	49	15	9	0.5	0.2	5.2	3.0	8.2	2.5	1.5
2015	Geelong	40	19	2	0	189	140	329	84	42	0.1	0.0	9.9	7.4	17.3	4.4	2.2
2016	Geelong	40	0	—	—	—	—	—	—	—	—	—	—	—	—	—	—
2017	Geelong	40	10	2	1	83	60	143	40	17	0.2	0.1	8.3	6.0	14.3	4.0	1.7
2018	Geelong	40	7	3	0	68	41	109	31	14	0.4	0.0	9.7	5.9	15.6	4.4	2.0
Career			46	11	3	402	288	690	185	91	0.2	0.1	8.7	6.3	15.0	4.0	2.0
