= Tom Young (Australian footballer) =

Australian rules footballer (born 1992)

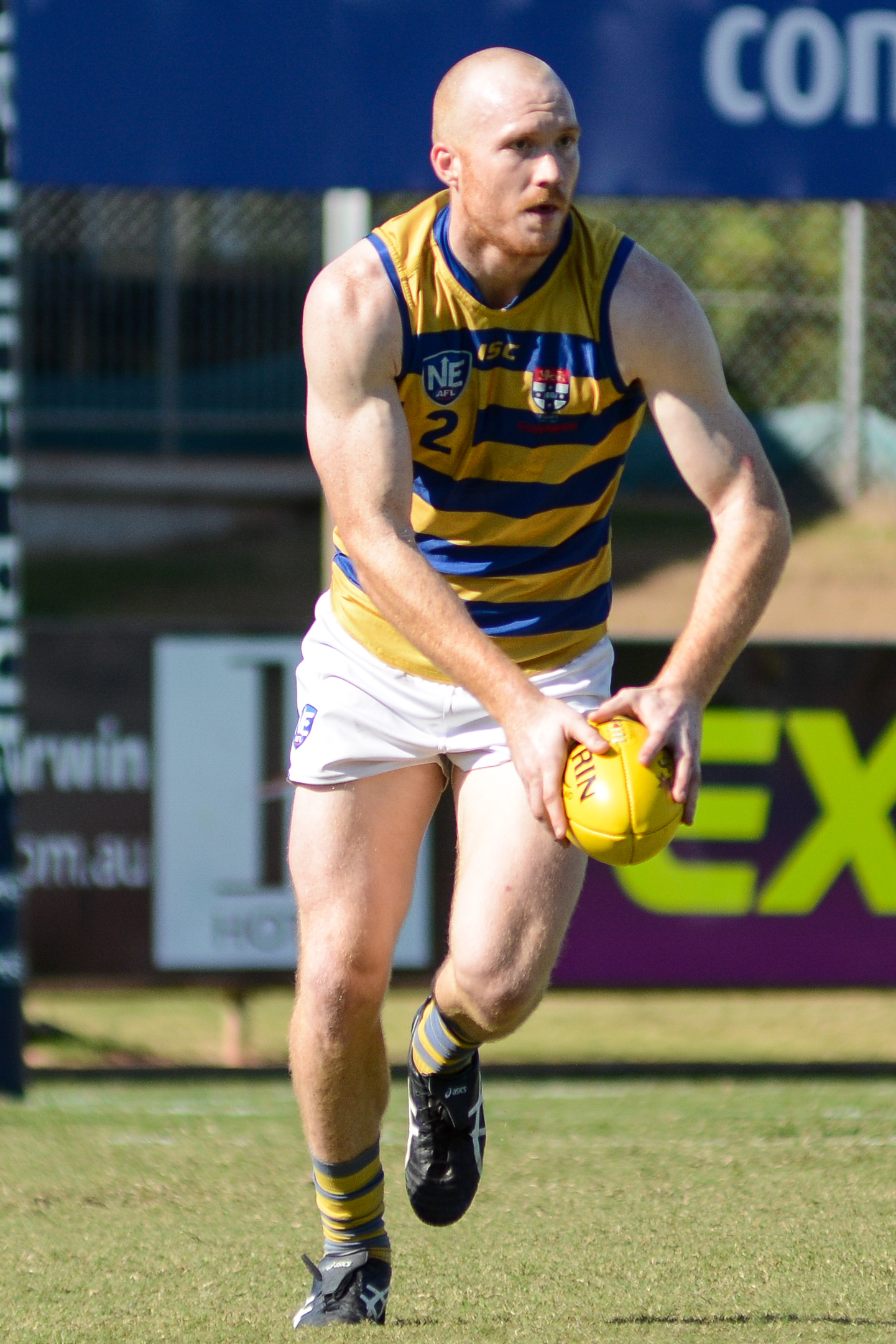
- Young playing for Sydney University in June 2016

Personal information
- Full name: Tom Young
- Born: 26 April 1992 (age 34)
- Draft: No. 104, 2010 National Draft; Collingwood (promoted from NSW scholarship list)
- Height: 191 cm (6 ft 3 in)
- Weight: 91 kg (201 lb)
- Position: Defender

Playing career^{1}
Years	Club	Games (Goals)
2011–2012	Collingwood	9 (2)
2013–2014	Western Bulldogs	17 (3)
Total		28 (5)
- ^{1} Playing statistics correct to the end of 2014.

Career highlights
- Joseph Wren Memorial Trophy: 2010

Tom Young (born 26 April 1992) is an Australian rules footballer who played for the Collingwood Football Club and the Western Bulldogs in the Australian Football League.

Young originally played for the Wollondilly Junior Football Club, near Bowral in New South Wales. He then played football in Campbelltown and then for the Sydney University Australian National Football Club. In 2009, he represented NSW/ACT Rams at the AFL Under 18 Championships and also won the Sydney AFL Rising Star award whilst playing for Sydney Uni. In 2007 he was a recipient of a NSW AFL Scholarship from Collingwood, after being previously courted by other AFL clubs. He was named as Collingwood's best player in the reserves team in the Victorian Football League (VFL) in 2010, and was elevated to their senior list with the 104th selection in the 2010 AFL draft.

Young made his AFL debut in Round 22, 2011 where he played the Brisbane Lions at the MCG.

Tom Young was traded to the Western Bulldogs during the 2012 trade period. Collingwood received pick 71 as their NSW scholarship player left after playing 9 games.

Young was delisted at the conclusion of the 2014 AFL season.
