= Campbell Heath =

Australian rules footballer

Personal information
- Full name: Campbell Heath
- Born: 1 April 1991 (age 35)
- Original team: Gippsland Power
- Draft: 61st overall, 2008, Sydney #31, 2012 Pre-Season draft, Sydney
- Height: 187 cm (6 ft 2 in)
- Weight: 75 kg (165 lb)

Playing career^{1}
Years	Club	Games (Goals)
2010	Sydney	2 (0)
2013–2014	Port Adelaide	12 (3)
Total		14 (3)
- ^{1} Playing statistics correct to the end of 2014.

Campbell Heath (born 1 April 1991) is an Australian rules footballer who played for the Sydney Swans and Port Adelaide Football Club in the Australian Football League (AFL).

Heath was drafted to Sydney with the 61st selection in the 2008 AFL draft. He was the second-youngest player selected. and played across half-back for the Gippsland Power in the TAC Cup. Heath remained in Melbourne for the 2009 season to finish his schooling before moving to Sydney in 2010.

He made his senior AFL debut in Sydney's round 9, 2010 loss to Fremantle at the Sydney Cricket Ground in May 2010.

He was traded to Port Adelaide during the 2012 trade period, wanting to have more opportunities at AFL level. He made his debut for Port Adelaide in round 1, 2013, against Melbourne. Heath was delisted by Port Adelaide at the end of the 2014 season.
