= 2010 Adelaide Football Club season =

Adelaide Football Club
2010 season
- President: Rob Chapman
- Coach: Neil Craig
- Captain: Simon Goodwin
- Home ground: AAMI Stadium
- Pre-season competition: First round
- AFL season: 11th
- Finals series: N/A
- Best and Fairest: Richard Douglas
- Leading goalkicker: Kurt Tippett (46)
- Highest home attendance: 41,195 vs. Geelong (16 July 2010)
- Lowest home attendance: 29,321 vs. Western Bulldogs (8 August 2010)
- Average home attendance: 35,773

The 2010 AFL season was the 20th season of the Adelaide Football Club in the AFL on the back of a 5th place and a semi-final exit in the 2009 AFL season. It was Neil Craig's 7th season at the helm after taking over from Gary Ayres as coach in 2004. The captain for this season was Simon Goodwin and the leadership group consisted of Brad Symes, Scott Stevens, Nathan van Berlo, Ben Rutten, Michael Doughty, Brett Burton and Tyson Edwards.

== Squad for 2010 ==
Statistics are correct as of start of 2010 season. Flags represent place of birth.

Senior List
No.	Born	Player	Hgt (cm)	Wgt (kg)	Date of birth	Age	Debut	Recruited from	Games	Goals
2	(England)	Brad Moran	200	98	29 September 1986	23	2006	Southport/North Melbourne	17	7
3	(Victoria (state))	Brent Reilly	184	85	12 November 1983	26	2003	Calder U18	113	42
4	(Queensland)	Kurt Tippett	201	100	8 May 1987	22	2008	Southport	43	72
5	(South Australia)	Scott Thompson	185	85	14 March 1983	27	2001	Port Adelaide Magpies/Melbourne	155	109
6	(Western Australia)	Jonathon Griffin	201	97	14 January 1986	24	2007	East Fremantle	30	5
7	(Western Australia)	Nathan van Berlo	185	83	6 June 1986	23	2005	West Perth	97	26
8	(Victoria (state))	Myke Cook	184	76	9 October 1989	20	2009	Sandringham U18	3	0
9	(South Australia)	Tyson Edwards	178	81	6 August 1976	33	1995	West Adelaide	311	190
10	(Western Australia)	Jarrhan Jacky	179	76	5 April 1989	20	2008	Subiaco	3	1
11	(South Australia)	Michael Doughty	178	80	5 August 1979	30	2000	South Adelaide	166	42
12	(Victoria (state))	Daniel Talia	194	89	2 October 1991	18	****	Calder U18	0	0
13	(New South Wales)	Taylor Walker	192	87	25 April 1990	19	2009	NSW/ACT Rams	14	23
14	(Victoria (state))	David Mackay	182	72	25 July 1988	21	2008	Oakleigh U18	39	11
15	(South Australia)	Brad Symes	187	82	7 March 1985	25	2004	Central District/Port Adelaide	56	7
16	(Australian Capital Territory)	Phil Davis	195	85	30 August 1990	19	2010	North Adelaide	0	0
17	(South Australia)	Bernie Vince	188	86	2 October 1985	24	2006	Woodville-West Torrens	55	31
18	(South Australia)	Graham Johncock	180	84	21 October 1982	27	2001	Port Adelaide Magpies	169	91
20	(Victoria (state))	Ivan Maric	198	102	4 January 1986	24	2006	Calder U18	50	21
21	(Victoria (state))	Chris Knights	185	84	25 September 1986	23	2005	Vermont/Eastern Ranges U18	70	53
22	(Victoria (state))	Andy Otten	192	87	15 May 1989	20	2008	Oakleigh U18	26	1
23	(Northern Territory)	Andrew McLeod	181	82	4 August 1976	33	1995	Port Adelaide Magpies	328	266
24	(South Australia)	Brett Burton	185	83	4 May 1978	31	1999	Woodville-West Torrens	171	257
25	(South Australia)	Ben Rutten	191	102	28 May 1983	26	2005	West Adelaide	126	6
26	(Victoria (state))	Richard Douglas	192	86	6 February 1987	23	2006	Calder U18	56	38
27	(Western Australia)	Scott Stevens	195	87	15 January 1982	28	2002	Perth/Sydney	124	82
28	(Victoria (state))	Jack Gunston	191	74	16 May 1991	18	2010	Sandringham U18	0	0
29	(South Australia)	James Sellar	196	95	24 March 1989	21	2008	Glenelg	12	2
30	(South Australia)	James Craig	195	92	18 April 1991	18	****	North Adelaide	0	0
31	(Victoria (state))	Rory Sloane	182	78	17 March 1990	20	2009	Eastern Ranges U18	1	0
32	(Victoria (state))	Patrick Dangerfield	188	84	5 April 1990	19	2008	Geelong Falcons U18	23	22
33	(South Australia)	Jared Petrenko	176	74	22 December 1989	20	2009	Woodville-West Torrens	9	4
34	(Victoria (state))	Sam Shaw	191	80	5 April 1990	20	****	Oakleigh U18	0	0
35	(Victoria (state))	Shaun McKernan	196	94	1 September 1990	20	2009	Calder U18	1	0
36	(South Australia)	Simon Goodwin	184	86	26 December 1976	33	1997	South Adelaide	259	160
37	(South Australia)	Trent Hentschel	193	89	25 December 1982	27	2003	Woodville-West Torrens	68	94
38	(New South Wales)	Tony Armstrong	183	72	29 September 1989	20	2010	NSW/ACT Rams/Calder U18	0	0
39	(Victoria (state))	Will Young	192	83	3 August 1990	19	2010	North Ballarat U18	0	0
40	(South Australia)	Jason Porplyzia	178	82	27 November 1984	25	2006	West Adelaide	68	114
41	(South Australia)	Brodie Martin	180	72	6 November 1988	21	2009	Sturt	2	1
44	(South Australia)	Nathan Bock	194	92	20 March 1983	27	2004	Woodville-West Torrens	100	56
45	(Victoria (state))	Ricky Henderson	190	78	11 September 1988	21	2010	Trentham	0	0
46	(South Australia)	Chris Schmidt	189	82	20 March 1989	21	2007	West Adelaide/Brisbane Lions	2	0
48	(South Australia)	Matthew Jaensch	182	80	18 September 1989	20	2010	Sturt	0	0
Rookie List
No.	Born	Player	Hgt	Wgt	Date of birth	Age	Debut	Recruited from	Games	Goals
1	(Victoria (state))	Luke Thompson	193	87	8 February 1991	19	****	Geelong Falcons U18	0	0
42	(Republic of Ireland)	Brian Donnelly	191	84	21 June 1988	21	****	(Republic of Ireland) Louth GAA	0	0
43	(New South Wales)	Aidan Riley	181	76	13 December 1991	18	****	Wollongong Lions	0	0
47	(South Australia)	Matthew Wright	179	81	14 December 1989	20	****	North Adelaide	0	0

== Player changes for 2010 ==
=== In ===
Player	Previous club	League	via
(Victoria (state)) Daniel Talia	Calder Cannons	TAC Cup	2009 AFL draft - Pick #13
(Victoria (state)) Jack Gunston	Sandringham Dragons	TAC Cup	2009 AFL draft - Pick #29
(Victoria (state)) Sam Shaw	Oakleigh Chargers	TAC Cup	2009 AFL draft - Pick #45
(South Australia) James Craig	North Adelaide	SANFL	2009 AFL draft - Pick #61
(Victoria (state)) Luke Thompson	Geelong Falcons	TAC Cup	2010 rookie draft - Pick #11
(South Australia) Matthew Wright	North Adelaide	SANFL	2010 rookie draft - Pick #33
(South Australia) Matthew Jaensch	Sturt	SANFL	2010 rookie draft - Pick #46
(New South Wales) Aidan Riley	Wollongong Lions	Sydney AFL	2010 rookie draft - Pick #58 (NSW Scholarship)

=== Out ===
Player	New Club	League	via
(South Australia) Robert Shirley	Ainslie Football Club	AFL Canberra	Delisted
(South Australia) Nick Gill	North Adelaide	SANFL	Delisted
(South Australia) Greg Gallman	North Adelaide	SANFL	Delisted
(Victoria (state)) Aaron Kite	Norwood	SANFL	Delisted
(Western Australia) Tom Lee	Sturt	SANFL	Delisted

== NAB Cup ==
The 2010 NAB Cup was disappointing for the Crows, being eliminated in the first round by rivals Port Adelaide. Adelaide never threatened and went down by 56 points, in line for a hot country warm-up via the NAB Challenge route. The Crows travelled to Traeger Park in Alice Springs and were welcomed by torrential downpours. Collingwood defeated the Crows by 20 points, 11.10 (76) – 8.6 (54).

Adelaide came back to South Australia for a clash with last seasons wooden spooners Melbourne. The game was played at Elizabeth Oval, home of local club Central District, and Adelaide prevailed by two points for their first win of the new season.

The last match of Adelaide's pre-season was played against Carlton at Visy Park. It was another close affair, with the Crows prevailing by a point.

== Home and away season ==
=== Round 1 ===
Round 1
28 March 2010, 5:10 pm	Fremantle	def.	Adelaide	Subiaco Oval (crowd: 30,976)	Report
2.5 (17); 9.9 (63); 12.11 (83); 17.16 (118)	Q1; Q2; Q3; Final	2.3 (15); 4.3 (27); 9.4 (58); 9.8 (62)	Umpires: Kennedy, Nicholls, Keating; Most DT Pts: Michael Barlow (Fremantle), 128 pts Television broadcast: Fox Sports 1
Headland, Pavlich 3 Barlow, Mayne 2 Ballantyne, Ibbotson, Silvagni, Crowley, Morabito, Johnson, Mundy 1	Goals	Walker 4 Thompson 2 Dangerfield, Bock, Tippett 1
Barlow, Sandilands, Mundy, Hill, Duffield, Pavlich, Broughton	Best	Thompson, Walker, Edwards, Reilly
Crowley (shoulder)	Injuries	Sloane (ankle), Walker (concussion)
Nil	Reports	Nil
Young forward Taylor Walker kicked four goals in a standout performance for Adelaide.; Tony Armstrong made his debut for the side, and picked up 11 disposals.; It was Adelaide's first loss to Fremantle since round 5, 2007, where they were pipped by a point.; This was the third straight year in which Adelaide started the season with an away game.

=== Round 2 ===
Round 2
4 April 2010, 12:40 pm	Adelaide	def. by	Sydney	AAMI Stadium (crowd: 36,041)	Report
2.3 (15); 4.5 (29); 8.7 (55); 11.9 (75)	Q1; Q2; Q3; Final	4.3 (27); 11.4 (70); 14.9 (93); 18.10 (118)	Umpires: Farmer, Rosebury, McInerney; Most DT Pts: Ben McGlynn (Sydney), 134 pts Television broadcast: Fox Sports 1
Dangerfield 5 Petrenko, McLeod 2 Douglas, Burton 1	Goals	McGlynn 5 O'Keefe 3 Seaby, Kennedy, Bradshaw 2 Moore, Kirk, Goodes, Jack 1
Dangerfield, Petrenko, Thompson	Best	McGlynn, O'Keefe, McVeigh, Seaby, Goodes, Hannebery
Sellar (hamstring)	Injuries	Nil
Nil	Reports	Nil
Will Young made his debut for the side after Nathan van Berlo was a late withdrawal. He got 10 touches and 5 marks.; It was Adelaide's first loss to the Swans since Round 15, 2004 and the first at Football Park since Round 16, 2001.; Adelaide lost its home opener for the 9th time in 12 seasons.

=== Round 3 ===
Round 3
11 April 2010, 12:40 pm	Melbourne	def.	Adelaide	MCG (crowd: 23,335)	Report
1.5 (11); 1.8 (14); 5.11 (41); 7.15 (57)	Q1; Q2; Q3; Final	2.5 (17); 4.9 (33); 5.10 (40); 5.11 (41)	Umpires: Ryan, McBurney, Armstrong; Most DT Pts: Simon Goodwin (Adelaide), 116 pts Television broadcast: Fox Sports 1
Bate 2 McDonald, Jones, Green, Bennell, Trengove 1	Goals	Burton 3 Cook, Maric 1
Grimes, McDonald, Green, Trengove, Jamar, Frawley	Best	Vince, Goodwin, Mackay, Burton, Doughty, Thompson
Sylvia (jaw), replaced in selected side by Garland	Injuries	Stevens (concussion), replaced in the selected side by Schmidt, Bock (hamstring), Dangerfield (shoulder), Hentschel (knee), Tippett (ankle)
Nil	Reports	Nil
Former Brisbane Lions player Chris Schmidt made an impressive debut for the Crows with 20 disposals and 9 marks after being elevated from the rookie list earlier in the week.; The Crows wore their unpopular predominantly white away strip for the first time in this game.

=== Round 4 ===
Round 4
17 April 2010, 2:40 pm	Adelaide	def. by	Carlton	AAMI Stadium (crowd: 38,321)	Report
2.7 (19); 3.9 (27); 4.15 (39); 6.19 (55)	Q1; Q2; Q3; Final	5.1 (31); 10.4 (64); 12.5 (77); 16.7 (103)	Umpires: Wenn, Avon, Mollison; Most DT Pts: Marc Murphy (Carlton), 144 pts Television broadcast: Network Ten/One
Thompson 2 Burton, Douglas, Knights, Walker 1	Goals	Garlett, Houlihan, Yarran 3 Simpson 2 Betts, Henderson, Judd, Ó hAilpín, Scotland 1
Vince, Edwards, Knights, McLeod	Best	Murphy, A Walker, Judd, Simpson, Houlihan, Yarran, Garlett
Nil	Injuries	Nil
Nil	Reports	Matthew Kreuzer (negligent contact with an umpire)
Phil Davis made his AFL debut in this game. He was solid with 16 disposals and 7 marks.; With no wins and four losses, this is Adelaide's worst start to a season since 2004 and their worst under coach Neil Craig.; It was Adelaide's first loss to the Blues at Football Park since Round 11, 2004.

=== Round 5 ===
Round 5
23 April 2010, 7:40 pm	Western Bulldogs	def.	Adelaide	Etihad Stadium (crowd: 26,884)	Report
4.3 (27); 10.5 (65); 15.11 (101); 18.13 (121)	Q1; Q2; Q3; Final	4.4 (28); 7.5 (47); 8.9 (57); 10.12 (72)	Umpires: Stevic, Pannell, McInerney; Most DT Pts: Daniel Giansiracusa (Western Bulldogs), 125pts Television broadcast: Seven Network
Hall 5 Eagleton 3 Hahn, Griffen, Grant 2 Giansiracusa, Higgins, Roughead, Murphy 1	Goals	Tippett 3 Porplyzia, Burton 2 Vince, Dangerfield, Knights 1
Giansiracusa, Griffen, Eagleton, Hall, Gilbee, Hahn, Johnson	Best	Thompson, Vince, Edwards, Tippett, Reilly, Davis, Dangerfield
Hargrave (neck) replaced in selected side by Moles	Injuries	Nil
Nil	Reports	Nil
Ricky Henderson made his debut for the Crows in this game and showed a few positive glimpses after being elevated from the rookie list earlier in the week.; After earning no points from five games, Adelaide equalled their worst ever start to a season in their history. The other was in 2000.

=== Round 6 ===
Round 6 (Showdown)
1 May 2010, 2:40 pm	Adelaide	def. by	Port Adelaide	AAMI Stadium (crowd: 40,371)	Report
4.2 (26); 7.7 (49); 9.10 (64); 10.14 (74)	Q1; Q2; Q3; Final	4.1 (25); 6.4 (40); 8.9 (57); 14.13 (97)	Umpires: Stewart, Schmitt, Ryan; Showdown Medal: Robbie Gray (Port Adelaide); Television broadcast: Fox Sports 1
Porplyzia, Tippett 3 Douglas 2 McLeod, Stevens 1	Goals	Gray 5 Ebert, Cassisi 2 Schulz, Pearce, Westhoff, Tredrea, C. Cornes 1
Johncock, Edwards, Porplyzia, McLeod, Reilly	Best	Gray, Pearce, K. Cornes, Cassisi, Boak, C. Cornes
Nil	Injuries	Nil
Nil	Reports	Nil
Matthew Jaensch made his debut for the Crows in this game. He had 11 disposals, 7 marks and 5 tackles.; After this game, at 0 wins and 6 losses, the Crows have had their worst start to an AFL season in their history.

=== Round 7 ===
Round 7
9 May 2010, 4:10 pm	Adelaide	def.	Richmond	AAMI Stadium (crowd: 31,196)	Report
3.0 (18); 5.3 (33); 7.9 (51); 15.14 (104)	Q1; Q2; Q3; Final	3.3 (21); 6.5 (41); 6.10 (46); 7.12 (54)	Umpires: Margetts, Ryan, Avon; Most DT Pts: Scott Thompson (Adelaide), 121 pts Television broadcast: Fox Sports 1
Tippett 4 Porplyzia 3 Douglas, McLeod 2 Thompson, Doughty, Johncock, Petrenko 1	Goals	Nahas, Riewoldt 2 S. Edwards, Tuck, White 1
McLeod, Maric, Johncock, van Berlo, Tippett	Best	S. Edwards, Moore, Tuck, Cotchin, Deledio, Nahas
Douglas (ribs), Johncock (arm)	Injuries	Farmer replaced in selected side by McGuane
Nil	Reports	Nil
Adelaide finally managed their first win of the season, to remain off the bottom of the table.; With scores tied early in the last quarter, the Crows blew the game apart to win by 50 points, kicking 15.14, their highest score of the season.; It was widely viewed that the result of this game would consign Richmond to the wooden spoon, as both teams were winless coming into the game.

=== Round 8 ===
Round 8
15 May 2010, 7:10 pm	North Melbourne	def.	Adelaide	Etihad Stadium (crowd: 16,479)	Report
4.3 (27); 8.6 (54); 12.11 (83); 12.12 (84)	Q1; Q2; Q3; Final	2.3 (15); 2.4 (16); 4.5 (29); 11.9 (75)	Umpires: Nicholls, Jeffery, Keating; Most DT Pts: Andrew Swallow (North Melbourne), 129 pts Television broadcast: Fox Sports 1
Harvey 3 Harding, Wells, A. Edwards, Swallow 2 Thomas, Goldstein 1	Goals	Walker 3 Porplyzia 2 Stevens, McLeod, Petrenko, Cook, Vince, Tippett 1
Rawlings, Swallow, Wells, Goldstein, Harvey, A. Edwards	Best	McLeod, Armstrong, Bock, Walker, Goodwin, Rutten, Schmidt
Hale (back spasms)	Injuries	Nil
Nil	Reports	Nil
Adelaide kicked just 2 goals for the first half, and a unanswered 7 goal last quarter made the scoreboard look more attractive.

=== Round 9 ===
Round 9
23 May 2010, 12:40 pm	Adelaide	def.	Brisbane Lions	AAMI Stadium (crowd: 31,517)	Report
5.3 (33); 6.9 (45); 9.12 (66); 13.15 (93)	Q1; Q2; Q3; Final	2.2 (14); 6.5 (41); 9.11 (65); 11.15 (81)	Umpires: Grun, Nicholls, Meredith; Most DT Pts: Ashley McGrath (Brisbane Lions), 140pts Television broadcast: Fox Sports 1
Douglas, Dangerfield 3 Walker, McLeod 2 Porplyzia, Gunston 1	Goals	Fevola 5 McGrath, Banfield 2 Rich, Sherman 1
van Berlo, Douglas, Rutten, Thompson	Best	McGrath, Banfield, Rich
Nil	Injuries	Nil
Nil	Reports	Nil
Eighteen-year-old Sandringham recruit Jack Gunston made his AFL debut in this game and kicked a vital goal in the last quarter. However, he had the least disposals for Adelaide with 7.; The Crows have won their last three final quarters by a total of 16.5 (101).

=== Round 10 ===
Round 10
29 May 2010, 6:40 pm	St Kilda	def.	Adelaide	Etihad Stadium (crowd: 28,708)	Report
5.1 (31); 7.2 (44); 12.7 (81); 19.9 (123)	Q1; Q2; Q3; Final	2.1 (13); 7.2 (44); 11.4 (70); 12.4 (76)	Umpires: Donlon, McBurney, Sully; Most DT Pts: Leigh Montagna (St Kilda), 151 pts Television broadcast: Network Ten/One
Montagna 5 Milne 3 Schneider, Dal Santo, McQualter 2 Stanley, Ray, Goddard, Gwilt, Gardiner 1	Goals	Tippett, Dangerfield 3 Van Berlo, Walker, Petrenko, Porplyzia, Maric, Douglas 1
Montagna, Dal Santo, Fisher, Milne	Best	Douglas, Bock, Tippett
Nil	Injuries	Bock (groin)
Nil	Reports	Nil
Nathan Bock was influential from centre half-back for Adelaide with 25 touches and it was no coincidence that the Crows struggled when he limped to the bench with a groin injury late in the third quarter.; Richard Douglas was the leading possession winner for Adelaide with 31 disposals while Kurt Tippett and Patrick Dangerfield each kicked three goals.

=== Round 11 ===
Round 11
5 June 2010, 2:40 pm	Adelaide	def.	Fremantle	AAMI Stadium (crowd: 35,605)	Report
6.1 (37); 11.3 (69); 12.6 (78); 16.9 (105)	Q1; Q2; Q3; Final	5.3 (33); 7.4 (46); 10.6 (66); 12.10 (82)	Umpires: Avon, McInerney, Mollison; Most DT Pts: Scott Thompson (Adelaide), 143 pts Television broadcast: Fox Sports 1
Walker 4 Edwards, Dangerfield, Thompson 2 McLeod, Petrenko, Johncock, Tippett, Goodwin, Porplyzia 1	Goals	Pavlich, Barlow 3 Hill 2 Sandilands, Mayne, van Berlo, Fyfe 1
Johncock, Thompson, Edwards, Mackay	Best	Barlow, Sandilands, Hill
Davis (concussion), McLeod (knee)	Injuries	Nil
Nil	Reports	Nil
This was Tyson Edwards' last game after his announced retirement; he played 321 AFL games. Edwards finished with 32 possessions and two goals in a near best-on-ground performance.; Andrew McLeod's troublesome knee locked up at half time, while Phil Davis suffered concussion after being cleaned up by Fremantle giant Aaron Sandilands.

=== Round 12 ===
Round 12
12 June 2010, 2:10 pm	Hawthorn	def.	Adelaide	Aurora Stadium (crowd: 16,167)	Report
7.2 (44); 9.3 (57); 13.4 (82); 19.10 (124)	Q1; Q2; Q3; Final	2.3 (15); 6.6 (42); 9.6 (60); 11.11 (77)	Umpires: Ryan, Chamberlain, Armstrong; Most DT Pts: Cyril Rioli (Hawthorn), 143 pts Television broadcast: Fox Sports 1
Franklin, Roughead, Hodge, Rioli 3 Peterson, Osborne 2 Muston, Ellis, Guerra 1	Goals	Tippett 4 Dangerfield, Walker 2 Henderson, Douglas, Stevens 1
Rioli, Hodge, Lewis	Best	Douglas, Armstrong, Mackay
Nil	Injuries	Thompson (eye)
Nil	Reports	Nil
Nathan van Berlo, Richard Douglas and David Mackay battled hard in a misfiring side.; Adelaide came close to closing the margin to single figures late in the third term, but the Hawks blew the Crows away in the final quarter.

=== Round 13 (Split Round) ===
Round 13
27 June 2010, 2:40 pm	Adelaide	def.	Melbourne	AAMI Stadium (crowd: 34,442)	Report
4.6 (30); 9.10 (64); 10.19 (79); 16.21 (117)	Q1; Q2; Q3; Final	1.3 (9); 3.5 (23); 8.6 (54); 11.7 (73)	Umpires: Ryan, Armstrong, Jeffery; Most DT Pts: Simon Goodwin (Adelaide), 133 pts Television broadcast: Fox Sports 1
Tippett 4 Jaensch 3 Walker 2 Johncock, Griffin, Vince, Maric, Henderson, Van Berlo, Dangerfield 1	Goals	Bate 4 Green, Dunn, Bruce 2 Jetta 1
Goodwin, Johncock, Douglas, Symes	Best	Bate, Grimes, Green
Mackay (sprained ankle)	Injuries	Nil
Nil	Reports	Nil
Graham Johncock (32 possessions) shrugged off a Lynden Dunn tag to star across half-back.; The win saw Adelaide climb to 14th on the ladder and temporarily out of wooden-spoon contention.

=== Round 14 ===
Round 14
2 July 2010, 7:10 pm	Adelaide	def.	Essendon	AAMI Stadium (crowd: 37,296)	Report
7.1 (43); 12.5 (77); 15.7 (97); 19.10 (124)	Q1; Q2; Q3; Final	1.3 (9); 2.4 (16); 4.8 (32); 5.10 (40)	Umpires: Chamberlain, Hay, Avon; Most DT Pts: Scott Thompson (Adelaide), 146 pts Television broadcast: Network Ten/One
Tippett 6 Dangerfield 4 Walker, Henderson 3 Goodwin, Vince, Thompson 1	Goals	Ryder 2 Hocking, Lonergan, Slattery 1
Tippett, Thompson, Dangerfield, Douglas	Best	Ryder, Winderlich, Welsh
Jaensch (concussion), Griffin (ankle)	Injuries	Slattery (tbc), Slattery (broken nose)
Nil	Reports	Hooker (striking)
The Crows kicked seven of the opening eight goals to lead by 34 points at quarter time and added another five in the second term to increase the margin to 61 at half time.; Kurt Tippett was the hero with six goals, Patrick Dangerfield slotted four, while Taylor Walker and rookie Ricky Henderson kicked three.; Scott Thompson and Richard Douglas dominated around the stoppages and skipper Simon Goodwin continued his consistent season.

=== Round 15 ===
Round 15
10 July 2010, 1:10 pm	West Coast	def. by	Adelaide	Subiaco Oval (crowd: 26,976)	Report
2.2 (14); 7.5 (47); 10.9 (69); 14.11 (95)	Q1; Q2; Q3; Final	4.3 (27); 6.9 (45); 10.12 (72); 17.15 (117)	Umpires: McLaren, Grun, Keating; Most DT Pts: Andrew Embley (West Coast), 124 pts Television broadcast: Fox Sports 1
LeCras 4 Embley 3 Stevenson 2 Selwood, Cox, Sheppard, Hams, Smith 1	Goals	Tippett 4 Henderson, Jaensch 3 Porplyzia 2 Symes, Vince, Dangerfield, Walker, Sloane 1
LeCras, Rosa, Cox	Best	Thompson, Goodwin, Reilly, Dangerfield
Waters (hamstring)	Injuries	Nil
Nil	Reports	Nil
Kurt Tippett was again solid up forward with four goals.; Young rookies Ricky Henderson and Matthew Jaensch both kicked three.

=== Round 16 ===
Round 16
17 July 2010, 8:10 pm	Adelaide	def.	Geelong	AAMI Stadium (crowd: 41,195)	Report
2.3 (15); 4.3 (27); 8.8 (56); 11.8 (74)	Q1; Q2; Q3; Final	3.1 (19); 5.3 (33); 7.3 (45); 9.9 (63)	Umpires: Wenn, Pannell, McInerney; Most DT Pts: Harry Taylor (Geelong), 131 pts Television broadcast: 7
Walker 4 Henderson, Sloane 2 Dangerfield, Tippett, van Berlo 1	Goals	Mooney, Stokes 2 Ablett, Byrnes, Chapman, Ottens, Varcoe 1
Vince, Johncock, Thompson, Goodwin, Reilly, Walker, Davis	Best	Taylor, Selwood, Chapman, Bartel, Mackie
Nil	Injuries	Nil
Doughty (rough conduct)	Reports	Nil
This was Adelaide's first win over Geelong since 2006.; Brent Reilly was superb, restricting Brownlow Medallist Gary Ablett to 19 largely ineffectual possessions.; Geelong club doctor Geoff Allen suffered a heart attack on-field prior to the match. Allen was taken to hospital, but has since made a recovery.

=== Round 17 ===
Round 17 (Showdown)
25 July 2010, 4:10 pm	Port Adelaide	def.	Adelaide	AAMI Stadium (crowd: 36,788)	Report
2.3 (15); 5.5 (35); 10.7 (67); 13.10 (88)	Q1; Q2; Q3; Final	1.5 (11); 2.9 (21); 5.10 (40); 9.15 (69)	Umpires: Margetts, McLaren, Hay; Showdown Medal: Domenic Cassisi (Port Adelaide); Television broadcast: Fox Sports 1
Westhoff 4 Ebert 3 Banner, Schulz, Rodan 2	Goals	Walker, Sloane, Scott Thompson 2 Dangerfield, Vince, Mackay 1
Cassisi, Pearce, Chaplin, Brogan, K Cornes, Westhoff, Boak, Ebert, Carlile	Best	Thompson, Henderson, Johncock, Porplyzia
Logan (concussion), Gray (cut chin)	Injuries	Nil
Nil	Reports	Johncock (rough conduct)
Kane Cornes kept Bernie Vince to just 18 possessions, while Kurt Tippett was held goalless by Alipate Carlile.; The Crows were inaccurate in front of goal for most of the day, kicking 2.9 in the first half.; This was Josh Carr's final game after he announced his retirement; he had played 206 games.

=== Round 18 ===
Round 18
1 August 2010, 1:10 pm	Richmond	def.	Adelaide	MCG (crowd: 19,181)	Report
4.4 (28); 5.4 (34); 11.7 (73); 15.10 (100)	Q1; Q2; Q3; Final	3.2 (20); 7.11 (53); 9.13 (67); 11.14 (80)	Umpires: McBurney, Kamolins, Jennings; Most DT Pts: Shane Tuck (Richmond), 141 pts Television broadcast: Fox Sports 1
King, Riewoldt 2 Tuck, Webberley, White, Martin, Morton, Browne, Cousins, Hicks, Jackson, McGuane, Newman 1	Goals	Douglas, Vince 2 Sloane, Dangerfield, Griffin, Walker, Reilly, Porplyzia, Thompson 1
Tuck, Cousins, Edwards, Connors	Best	Thompson, Symes, Mackay
Nil	Injuries	Nil
Nil	Reports	Nil

=== Round 19 ===
Round 19
8 August 2010, 4:10 pm	Adelaide	def. by	Western Bulldogs	AAMI Stadium (crowd: 29,321)	Report
1.5 (11); 5.7 (37); 7.10 (52); 7.11 (53)	Q1; Q2; Q3; Final	3.1 (19); 6.7 (43); 7.11 (53); 8.13 (61)	Umpires: Farmer, Kennedy, Mollison; Most DT Pts: Daniel Giansiracusa (Western Bulldogs), 140 pts Television broadcast: Fox Sports 1
Porplyzia 2 Stevens, Thompson, van Berlo, Douglas, Tippett 1	Goals	Jones 2 Johnson, Eagleton, Griffen, Hill, Giansiracusa, Grant 1
Thompson, Symes, Porplyzia	Best	Giansiracusa, Eagleton, Boyd, Griffen
Nil	Injuries	Nil
Nil	Reports	Roughead (rough conduct)

=== Round 20 ===
Round 20
15 August 2010, 1:10 pm	Brisbane Lions	def. by	Adelaide	Gabba (crowd: 25,403)	Report
4.7 (31); 6.12 (48); 12.14 (86); 13.19 (97)	Q1; Q2; Q3; Final	2.4 (16); 9.5 (59); 13.8 (86); 15.14 (104)	Umpires: Farmer, Ryan, Jennings; Most DT Pts: Richard Douglas (Adelaide), 135 pts Television broadcast: Southern Cross Ten/Fox Sports 1
Clark 5 Banfield, Black, Hanley, Harwood, Patfull, Polkinghorne, Power, Staker 1	Goals	Tippett 5 Porplyzia 3 Douglas 2 Henderson 2, Davis, van Berlo, Sellar 1
Clark, Black, Rockliff	Best	Tippett, Douglas, Symes, van Berlo
Nil	Injuries	Vince (knee), Knights (hamstring)
Nil	Reports	Nil

=== Round 21 ===
Round 21
21 August 2010, 7:10 pm	Collingwood	def.	Adelaide	MCG (crowd: 42,159)	Report
1.3 (9); 3.5 (23); 4.10 (34); 6.18 (54)	Q1; Q2; Q3; Final	3.3 (21); 4.7 (31); 6.8 (43); 7.9 (51)	Umpires: Farmer, Stevic, Findlay; Most DT Pts: Graham Johncock (Adelaide), 117 pts Television broadcast: Southern Cross Ten
Thomas, Brown 2 Cloke, Didak 1	Goals	Walker 2 Maric, Young, Henderson, Tippett, Stevens 1
Sidebottom, Pendlebury, Thomas, Didak	Best	Thompson, Johncock, Dangerfield
Nil	Injuries	Nil
Brown (striking)	Reports	Nil

=== Round 22 ===
Round 22
28 August 2010, 3:40 pm	Adelaide	def.	St Kilda	AAMI Stadium (crowd: 38,121)	Report
2.3 (15); 3.4 (22); 6.9 (45); 9.11 (65)	Q1; Q2; Q3; Final	2.2 (14); 3.3 (21); 5.5 (35); 5.7 (37)	Umpires: Kennedy, Meredith, McInerney; Most DT Pts: Jason Blake/Nick Dal Santo (St Kilda), 117 pts Television broadcast: Fox Sports 1
Walker 3 Tippett 2 Porplyzia, Douglas, Sloane, Jaensch 1	Goals	Dal Santo, Gardiner, Dempster, Koschitzke, Geary 1
Thompson, Douglas, Reilly, Doughty	Best	Hayes, Dal Santo, Goddard
Johncock (ankle), Symes (cut head/concussion)	Injuries	Fisher (hamstring)
Nil	Reports	Nil
Adelaide beat St Kilda at home for the first time since 2003.

== Statistics ==
=== Team ===
Highest score	19.10 (124) vs Essendon in round 14
Lowest score	7.6 (41) vs Melbourne in round 3

Highest ladder position	10 after rounds 14-16
Lowest ladder position	15 after rounds 1, 3-13
Highest percentage	94.3 after round 22
Lowest percentage	52.4 after round 1

Home W/L record	7-4
Away W/L record	2-9

Final Score for	250.207 (1707) - rank 7
Final Score against	269.207 (1821) - rank 5

=== Individual ===
Most games	22 - Richard Douglas, Brent Reilly, Michael Doughty, Ben Rutten, Kurt Tippett
Most kicks	276 - Scott Thompson; 275 - Richard Douglas
Most handballs	261 - Scott Thompson; 217 - Simon Goodwin
Most disposals	537 - Scott Thompson
Most hit-outs	370 - Ivan Maric
Most tackles	104 - Brent Reilly; 104 - Scott Thompson
Most marks	128 - Bernie Vince; 120 Scott Stevens
Most goals	46 - Kurt Tippett; 35 - Taylor Walker

== Ladder ==
2010 AFL ladder
Pos	Team	Pld	W	L	D	PF	PA	PP	Pts	
1	Collingwood (P)	22	17	4	1	2349	1658	141.7	70	Finals series
2	Geelong	22	17	5	0	2518	1702	147.9	68	Finals series
3	St Kilda	22	15	6	1	1935	1591	121.6	62	Finals series
4	Western Bulldogs	22	14	8	0	2174	1734	125.4	56	Finals series
5	Sydney	22	13	9	0	2017	1863	108.3	52	Finals series
6	Fremantle	22	13	9	0	2168	2087	103.9	52	Finals series
7	Hawthorn	22	12	9	1	2044	1847	110.7	50	Finals series
8	Carlton	22	11	11	0	2143	1983	108.1	44	Finals series
9	North Melbourne	22	11	11	0	1930	2208	87.4	44	
10	Port Adelaide	22	10	12	0	1749	2123	82.4	40	
11	Adelaide	22	9	13	0	1763	1870	94.3	36	
12	Melbourne	22	8	13	1	1863	1971	94.5	34	
13	Brisbane Lions	22	7	15	0	1775	2158	82.3	28	
14	Essendon	22	7	15	0	1930	2402	80.3	28	
15	Richmond	22	6	16	0	1714	2348	73.0	24	
16	West Coast	22	4	18	0	1773	2300	77.1	16	

Source: AFL ladder
Rules for classification: 1) points; 2) percentage; 3) number of points for.
(P) Premiers

== See also ==
- Adelaide Crows 2010 Playing List
