= 2011 Adelaide Football Club season =

Adelaide Football Club
2011 season
- President: Rob Chapman
- Coach: Neil Craig (rounds 1–18); Mark Bickley (rounds 19–22; caretaker)
- Captain: Nathan van Berlo
- Home ground: AAMI Stadium
- Pre-season competition: Round 1
- AFL season: 14th
- Finals series: N/A
- Best and Fairest: Scott Thompson
- Leading goalkicker: Taylor Walker (32)
- Highest home attendance: 42,536 vs. Hawthorn (26 March 2011)
- Lowest home attendance: 23,063 vs. Sydney (2 July 2011)

The 2011 AFL season was the Adelaide Football Club's 21st season in the Australian Football League (AFL). Neil Craig coached from round 1 to round 18, but was replaced by Mark Bickley who coached from round 19. Nathan van Berlo was appointed captain and the leadership group consisted of Scott Stevens, Ben Rutten, Michael Doughty and Scott Thompson.

== Squad ==
Statistics are correct as of start of 2011 season. Flags represent place of birth.

Senior List
No.	Born	Player	Hgt (cm)	Wgt (kg)	Date of birth	Age	Debut	Recruited from	Games	Goals
1	(Northern Territory)	Richard Tambling	181	84	12 September 1986	24	2005	Southern Districts/Richmond	108	61
2	(England)	Brad Moran	201	100	29 September 1986	24	2006	Southport/North Melbourne	17	7
3	(Victoria (state))	Brent Reilly	185	85	12 November 1983	27	2003	Calder U18	135	43
4	(Queensland)	Kurt Tippett	203	107	8 May 1987	23	2008	Southport	65	118
5	(South Australia)	Scott Thompson	187	86	14 March 1983	28	2001	Port Adelaide Magpies/Melbourne	176	121
6	(Victoria (state))	Jack Gunston	193	81	16 May 1991	19	2010	Sandringham U18	2	1
7	(Western Australia)	Nathan van Berlo	187	84	6 June 1986	24	2005	West Perth	116	31
8	(Victoria (state))	Myke Cook	184	83	9 October 1989	21	2009	Sandringham U18	12	2
9	(Victoria (state))	Rory Sloane	183	79	17 March 1990	21	2009	Eastern Ranges U18	15	7
10	(South Australia)	Matthew Jaensch	182	83	18 September 1989	21	2010	Sturt	11	7
11	(South Australia)	Michael Doughty	179	81	5 August 1979	31	2000	South Adelaide	188	43
12	(Victoria (state))	Daniel Talia	196	95	2 October 1991	19	****	Calder U18	0	0
13	(New South Wales)	Taylor Walker	194	98	25 April 1990	20	2009	NSW/ACT Rams	32	58
14	(Victoria (state))	David Mackay	183	75	25 July 1988	22	2008	Oakleigh U18	55	12
15	(South Australia)	Brad Symes	187	82	7 March 1985	26	2004	Central District/Port Adelaide	67	8
16	(Australian Capital Territory)	Phil Davis	197	94	30 August 1990	20	2010	North Adelaide	15	1
17	(South Australia)	Bernie Vince	188	89	2 October 1985	25	2006	Woodville-West Torrens	71	38
18	(South Australia)	Graham Johncock	180	87	21 October 1982	28	2001	Port Adelaide Magpies	184	94
20	(Victoria (state))	Ivan Maric	200	102	4 January 1986	25	2006	Calder U18	71	25
21	(Victoria (state))	Chris Knights	187	88	25 September 1986	24	2005	Vermont/Eastern Ranges U18	75	55
22	(Victoria (state))	Andy Otten	194	92	15 May 1989	21	2008	Oakleigh U18	26	1
23	(South Australia)	Jared Petrenko	179	82	22 December 1989	22	2009	Woodville-West Torrens	21	10
24	(South Australia)	Sam Jacobs	203	102	10 April 1988	23	2009	Woodville-West Torrens/Carlton	17	3
25	(South Australia)	Ben Rutten	192	101	28 May 1983	27	2005	West Adelaide	148	6
26	(Victoria (state))	Richard Douglas	182	80	6 February 1987	24	2006	Calder U18	78	55
27	(Western Australia)	Scott Stevens	195	87	15 January 1982	29	2002	Perth/Sydney	142	87
28	(Victoria (state))	Luke Thompson	196	89	8 February 1991	20	****	Geelong Falcons U18	0	0
29	(South Australia)	James Sellar	196	98	24 March 1989	22	2008	Glenelg	16	3
30	(South Australia)	James Craig	196	95	18 April 1991	19	****	North Adelaide	0	0
31	(Victoria (state))	Jarryd Lyons	196	95	22 July 1992	18	****	Sandringham Dragons	0	0
32	(Victoria (state))	Patrick Dangerfield	189	92	5 April 1990	20	2008	Geelong Falcons U18	42	48
33	(South Australia)	Brodie Smith	189	78	14 January 1992	19	****	Woodville-West Torrens	0	0
34	(Victoria (state))	Sam Shaw	194	86	5 April 1990	21	****	Oakleigh U18	0	0
35	(Victoria (state))	Shaun McKernan	198	98	1 September 1990	21	2009	Calder U18	1	0
36	(South Australia)	Brodie Martin	182	79	6 November 1988	22	2009	Sturt	4	1
38	(New South Wales)	Tony Armstrong	185	80	29 September 1989	21	2010	NSW/ACT Rams/Calder U18	9	0
39	(Victoria (state))	Will Young	194	88	3 August 1990	20	2010	North Ballarat U18	2	1
40	(South Australia)	Jason Porplyzia	179	82	27 November 1984	25	2006	West Adelaide	87	136
45	(Victoria (state))	Ricky Henderson	190	78	11 September 1988	21	2010	Trentham	0	0
Rookie List
No.	Born	Player	Hgt	Wgt	Date of birth	Age	Debut	Recruited from	Games	Goals
37	(South Australia)	Ian Callinan	172	74	20 December 1982	28	****	Central District	0	0
41	(New South Wales)	Sam Martyn	186	73	7 April 1992	18	****	NSW/ACT Rams	0	0
42	(South Australia)	Lachlan Roach	178	69	25 April 1992	18	****	North Adelaide	0	0
43	(New South Wales)	Aidan Riley	181	76	13 December 1991	18	****	Wollongong Lions	0	0
44	(South Australia)	Jake von Bertouch	192	80	4 May 1992	18	****	Woodville-West Torrens	0	0
46	(South Australia)	Chris Schmidt	190	89	20 March 1989	22	2007	West Adelaide/Brisbane Lions	15	0
47	(South Australia)	Matthew Wright	179	81	14 December 1989	20	****	North Adelaide	0	0
48	(South Australia)	Timothy Milera	171	77	3 September 1992	18	****	Port Adelaide Magpies	0	0

== Player changes for 2011 ==
=== In ===
Player	Previous club	League	via
(Northern Territory) Richard Tambling	Richmond	AFL	AFL Trade Week
(South Australia) Sam Jacobs	Carlton	AFL	AFL Trade Week
(South Australia) Brodie Smith	Woodville-West Torrens	SANFL	2010 AFL draft - Pick No. 14
(Victoria (state)) Jarryd Lyons	Sandringham Dragons	TAC Cup	2010 AFL draft - Pick No. 61
(South Australia) Timothy Milera	Port Adelaide Magpies	SANFL	2011 Rookie Draft - Pick No. 15
(South Australia) Jake von Bertouch	Woodville-West Torrens	SANFL	2011 Rookie Draft - Pick No. 32
(South Australia) Lachlan Roach	North Adelaide	SANFL	2011 Rookie Draft - Pick No. 49
(South Australia) Ian Callinan	Central District	SANFL	2011 Rookie Draft - Pick No. 64
(New South Wales) Sam Martyn	NSW/ACT Rams	TAC Cup	2011 Rookie Draft - Pick No. 84 (NSW Scholarship)

=== Out ===
Player	New Club	League	via
(Western Australia) Jonathon Griffin	Fremantle	AFL	Trade
(South Australia) Tyson Edwards	–		Retired
(Northern Territory) Andrew McLeod	–		Retired
(South Australia) Brett Burton	–		Retired
(South Australia) Simon Goodwin	–		Retired
(Republic of Ireland) Brian Donnely	–		Retired
(Western Australia) Jarrhan Jacky	–		Delisted
(South Australia) Nathan Bock	Gold Coast Suns	AFL	Gold Coast uncontracted signing

== NAB Cup ==
The 2011 NAB Cup was competed in a new format for the first time since 2003. Adelaide played two games on 11 February 2011, against Melbourne and Port Adelaide. Melbourne defeated Adelaide in the first game, 0.5.4 (34) – 0.3.6 (24). However, the team later defeated Port Adelaide, 0.6.4 (40) – 0.1.2 (8).

Adelaide did not make it into the second round of the NAB Cup, but were to play NAB Challenge/practice matches for the rest of the competition. Adelaide played Fremantle at Thebarton Oval on 26 February. They won by 74 points, 22.8 (140) – 10.6 (66). They then played Carlton at Visy Park on 4 March, losing by 34 points, 15.10 (100) – 11.10 (76). In the final pre-season match of 2011, Adelaide played Richmond, again at Visy Park on the 11th, this time coming up the winners by 68 points, 18.14 (122) – 8.6 (54).

== Home and away season ==
=== Round 1 ===
Round 1
Saturday, 26 March (7:10 pm)	Adelaide	def.	Hawthorn	AAMI Stadium (crowd: 42,536)	Report
1.3 (9); 4.5 (29); 11.7 (73); 16.9 (105)	Q1; Q2; Q3; Final	3.2 (20); 7.6 (48); 10.10 (70); 12.13 (85)	Umpires: Ryan, Meredith, Wenn; Most DT Pts: Scott Stevens (Adelaide), 125 pts Television broadcast: Network Ten
Walker 4 Dangerfield 3 Henderson, Knights, van Berlo 2 Vince, Porplyzia, McKernan 1	Goals	Burgoyne 3 Franklin, Roughead, Young 2 Bateman, Osborne, Savage 1
Dangerfield, Stevens, Walker, Reilly, Davis, van Berlo	Best	Mitchell, Burgoyne, Young
Porplyzia (shoulder)	Injuries	Nil
Nil	Reports	Nil
This match began Adelaide's 20th year in the AFL with a rematch against Hawthorn, their first opponent in this competition in their inaugural 1991 season.; This was Nathan van Berlo's first game as the 6th appointed captain.

=== Round 2 ===
Round 2
Bye; Adelaide

=== Round 3 ===
Round 3
Saturday, 9 April (2:40 pm)	Adelaide	def. by	Fremantle	AAMI Stadium (crowd: 33,414)	Report
0.3 (3); 2.5 (17); 4.9 (33); 7.12 (54)	Q1; Q2; Q3; Final	5.3 (33); 7.7 (49); 8.11 (59); 11.13 (79)	Umpires: Margetts, Rosebury, Jennings; Most DT Pts: Scott Thompson (Adelaide), 154 pts Television broadcast: Fox Sports
Walker 2 Vince, Dangerfield, McKernan, Stevens, Jaensch 1	Goals	McPhee, Mayne 2 Bradley, Fyfe, Crowley, Mundy, Palmer, Walters, Hill 1
S. Thompson, Dangerfield, van Berlo	Best	Fyfe, Hill, Mundy, Sandilands
Davis (shoulder)	Injuries	Sandilands (eye)
Maric (rough conduct)	Reports	Nil

=== Round 4 ===
Round 4 (Showdown)
Saturday, 16 April (7:10 pm)	Port Adelaide	def.	Adelaide	AAMI Stadium (crowd: 33,143)	Report
0.3 (3); 6.6 (42); 11.7 (73); 14.14 (98)	Q1; Q2; Q3; Final	4.6 (30); 7.9 (51); 7.11 (53); 9.12 (66)	Umpires: Bowen, Wenn, Pannell; Most DT Pts: Scott Thompson (Adelaide), 137 pts Television broadcast: Fox Sports
Rodan 4 Gray, Motlop, Westhoff 2 Surjan, C. Cornes, O'Shea, Salopek 1	Goals	Walker 2 Douglas, Tippett, S. Thompson, L. Thompson, McKernan, Jaensch, Vince 1
Westhoff, Rodan, Brogan, Boak, Chaplin, Pittard	Best	S. Thompson, van Berlo, Rutten, Douglas
Nil	Injuries	Nil
Nil	Reports	Nil

=== Round 5 ===
Round 5
Saturday, 23 April (7:10 pm)	Carlton	def.	Adelaide	Etihad Stadium (crowd: 37,607)	Report
5.5 (35); 6.12 (48); 8.17 (65); 11.19 (85)	Q1; Q2; Q3; Final	1.2 (8); 6.2 (38); 9.4 (58); 12.7 (79)	Umpires: Rosebury, Stewart, Wenn; Most DT Pts: Marc Murphy (Carlton), 126 pts Television broadcast: Network Ten
Walker 4 Waite, Ellard 2 Betts, Garlett, Russell 1	Goals	Walker 4 Tippett 3 McKernan 2 Jaensch, S. Thompson, Vince 1
Judd, Murphy, Walker, Ellard	Best	Johncock, Dangerfield, van Berlo
Yarran (hamstring cramp)	Injuries	Symes (broken nose), Jaensch (corked thigh)
Nil	Reports	Nil

=== Round 6 ===
Round 6
Saturday, 30 April (7:10 pm)	Adelaide	def.	St Kilda	AAMI Stadium (crowd: 33,854)	Report
4.3 (27); 6.9 (45); 8.10 (58); 13.12 (90)	Q1; Q2; Q3; Final	0.6 (6); 1.9 (15); 6.12 (48); 9.17 (71)	Umpires: McBurney, Kennedy, Mollison; Most DT Pts: Nick Dal Santo (St Kilda), 126 pts Television broadcast: Network Ten
Tippett 4 Knights 3 Douglas 2 McKernan, Wright, Walker, Dangerfield 1	Goals	Milne 3 Cripps 2 Steven, Jones, Dal Santo, Schneider 1
Douglas, S. Thompson, Tippett, Knights	Best	Dal Santo, Goddard, Armitage
Davis (shoulder)	Injuries	Riewoldt (concussion)
Tambling (striking), Jacobs (rough conduct), Kurt Tippett (striking)	Reports	Dawson (striking)

=== Round 7 ===
Round 7
Sunday, 8 May (2:10 pm)	Melbourne	def.	Adelaide	MCG (crowd: 19,987)	Report
2.7 (19); 6.11 (47); 14.16 (100); 22.17 (149)	Q1; Q2; Q3; Final	2.0 (12); 5.3 (33); 6.4 (40); 8.5 (53)	Umpires: Stevic, Jeffery, Keating; Most DT Pts: Colin Sylvia (Melbourne), 149 pts Television broadcast: Seven Network
Petterd, Sylvia 4 Jurrah 3 Watts, Wonaeamirri, Green 2 Dunn, Tapscott, Bartram, Bate, Jones 1	Goals	Tippett 3 Reilly 2 S. Thompson, van Berlo, McKernan 1
Moloney, Jones, Sylvia, Davey	Best	Jaensch, Reilly, van Berlo
Grimes (foot)	Injuries	Dangerfield (concussion), S. Thompson (calf), Wright (knee)
Trengove (rough conduct)	Reports	Nil

=== Round 8 ===
Round 8
Saturday, 14 May (2:40 pm)	Adelaide	def.	Gold Coast	AAMI Stadium (crowd: 36,056)	Report
2.2 (14); 9.7 (61); 14.10 (94); 20.10 (130)	Q1; Q2; Q3; Final	4.4 (28); 4.6 (30); 6.13 (49); 9.19 (73)	Umpires: Margetts, Rosebury, Hay; Most DT Pts: Gary Ablett Jr. (Gold Coast), 156 pts Television broadcast: Fox Sports
Dangerfield 6 Knights, Wright, Henderson, McKernan 2 Douglas, Reilly, Tippett, S. Thompson, Gunston, L. Thompson 1	Goals	G. Ablett 4 Smith, Lynch 2 McKenzie 1
Dangerfield, S. Thompson, van Berlo	Best	G. Ablett, Stanley, Harbrow
Nil	Injuries	Nil
Nil	Reports	Nil
Patrick Dangerfield kicked a career high six goals.

=== Round 9 ===
Round 9
Saturday, 22 May (1:10 pm)	Collingwood	def.	Adelaide	Etihad Stadium (crowd: 38,489)	Report
2.6 (18); 2.10 (22); 9.12 (60); 20.15 (135)	Q1; Q2; Q3; Final	4.1 (25); 8.4 (52); 12.6 (78); 14.8 (92)	Umpires: Ritchie, Rosebury, McInerney; Most DT Pts: Dale Thomas (Collingwood), 133 pts Television broadcast: Fox Sports
Dawes, Krakouer, Wellingham 3 Thomas, Tarrant, Ball 2 McCarthy, Buckley, Shaw, Beams, Swan 1	Goals	Tippett 3 Dangerfield, Sloane 2 van Berlo, Smith, Schmidt, Gunston, Knights, Henderson, Wright 1
Thomas, Ball, Wellingham, Pendlebury	Best	S. Thompson, Sloane, Johncock
Nil	Injuries	Nil
Nil	Reports	Nil
Patrick Dangerfield played his 50th game for Adelaide.

=== Round 10 ===
Round 10
Sunday, 29 May (12:40 pm)	Adelaide	def. by	Brisbane Lions	AAMI Stadium (crowd: 34,583)	Report
3.2 (20); 5.7 (37); 6.7 (43); 8.13 (61)	Q1; Q2; Q3; Final	1.3 (9); 6.7 (43); 11.11 (77); 15.11 (101)	Umpires: Donlon, Pannell, McInerney; Most DT Pts: Scott Thompson (Adelaide), 126 pts Television broadcast: Fox Sports
Jacobs, van Berlo, Knights, Henderson, Wright, Smith, Dangerfield, Walker 1	Goals	McGrath 4 Banfield 3 Clark, Retzlaff 2 Collier, Power, Rich, O'Brien 1
S. Thompson, Sloane, Knights, Douglas, Jacobs	Best	Clark, Leuenberger, Hanley, McGrath, Merrett, Black, Banfield
Walker (knee), Jacobs (finger)	Injuries	Nil
Nil	Reports	Nil

=== Round 11 ===
Round 11
Sunday, 5 June (2:10 pm)	North Melbourne	def.	Adelaide	Etihad Stadium (crowd: 18,185)	Report
6.1 (37); 8.3 (51); 13.5 (83); 18.7 (115)	Q1; Q2; Q3; Final	2.1 (13); 4.4 (28); 6.7 (43); 10.8 (68)	Umpires: Armstrong, Jeffery, Farmer; Most DT Pts: Todd Goldstein (North Melbourne), 144 pts Television broadcast: Seven Network
Petrie 4 Adams, Swallow, Harvey, Anthony 2 Edwards, Goldstein, Hansen, Ziebell, Speight, Harper 1	Goals	Tippett 3 Dangerfield, Gunston 2 Henderson, Sloane, S. Thompson 1
Swallow, Petrie, Wells, Ziebell, Goldstein, Anthony, Speight	Best	Johncock, Tippett, Jaensch, van Berlo, Vince, S. Thompson
MacMillan (fractured cheekbone), Adams (knee)	Injuries	Nil
Nil	Reports	Nil

=== Round 12 ===
Round 12
Saturday, 11 June (2:40 pm)	Adelaide	def. by	West Coast	AAMI Stadium (crowd: 31,412)	Report
3.1 (19); 3.3 (22); 8.5 (53); 10.7 (67)	Q1; Q2; Q3; Final	1.3 (9); 8.7 (55); 9.10 (64); 15.16 (106)	Umpires: Rosebury, Leppard, Hay; Most DT Pts: Matt Rosa (West Coast), 127 pts Television broadcast: Fox Sports
Wright, Douglas, Gunston, Sloane 2 Vince, Dangerfield 1	Goals	LeCras 5 Nicoski 3 Rosa 2 Naitanui, Cox, Priddis, Shuey, Kennedy 1
S. Thompson, Dangerfield, Petrenko, Johncock, Sloane, Douglas, Vince	Best	Kerr, Rosa, Hurn, Embley, Naitanui, Nicoski, A. Selwood
Gunston (finger), Dangerfield (thumb), Tippett (shoulder)	Injuries	Kerr (knee)
Nil	Reports	Nil

=== Round 13 ===
Round 13
Friday, 17 June (7:40 pm)	Western Bulldogs	def.	Adelaide	Etihad Stadium (crowd: 19,363)	Report
2.4 (16); 6.9 (45); 10.12 (72); 14.16 (100)	Q1; Q2; Q3; Final	6.2 (38); 7.5 (47); 9.7 (61); 10.10 (70)	Umpires: Rosebury, Findlay, Mollison; Most DT Pts: Scott Thompson (Adelaide), 116 pts Television broadcast: Seven Network
Giansiracusa 4 Sherman 3 Griffen 2 Murphy, Barlow, Minson, Wood, Dahlhaus 1	Goals	Tippett 3 Vince, McKernan, Wright, Sloane, Knights, Otten, Schmidt 1
Griffen, Murphy, Ward, Boyd, Giansiracusa, Dahlhaus	Best	S. Thompson, Henderson, Symes, Rutten
Nil	Injuries	Knights (migraine), Jaensch (ribs), Sloane (left thigh)
Nil	Reports	Nil

=== Round 14 ===
Round 14
Sunday, 26 June (1:10 pm)	Geelong	def.	Adelaide	Skilled Stadium (crowd: 23,246)	Report
7.3 (45); 9.6 (60); 14.10 (94); 19.11 (125)	Q1; Q2; Q3; Final	1.1 (7); 2.2 (14); 4.6 (24); 10.13 (73)	Umpires: Ryan, Wenn, McInerney; Most DT Pts: Corey Enright (Geelong), 152 pts Television broadcast: Fox Sports
Menzel, Brown 3 Johnson, Varcoe, Christensen, Ling 2 Mackie, Wojcinski, Podsiadly, Duncan, Motlop 1	Goals	Reilly 2 Vince, van Berlo, Gunston, Sloane, Douglas, Dangerfield, Callinan 1
Enright, Varcoe, Ling, Taylor, Menzel, Corey, Christensen, Mackie	Best	Vince, S. Thompson, Callinan, Rutten, Sloane
Nil	Injuries	Henderson (concussion), Schmidt (hamstring)
Nil	Reports	Nil

=== Round 15 ===
Round 15
Saturday, 2 July (7:10 pm)	Adelaide	def.	Sydney	AAMI Stadium (crowd: 23,063)	Report
2.1 (13); 3.4 (22); 5.5 (35); 8.9 (57)	Q1; Q2; Q3; Final	3.1 (19); 4.5 (29); 4.10 (34); 6.14 (50)	Umpires: Ritchie, Stevic, McInerney; Most DT Pts: Sam Jacobs (Adelaide), 120 pts Television broadcast: Fox Sports
Tippett 3 Callinan, Petrenko, Douglas, van Berlo, Sloane 1	Goals	Jetta, Goodes, Bird, O'Keefe, Bevan, McGlynn 1
Petrenko, Jacobs, S. Thompson, Tippett, van Berlo, Vince	Best	Bolton, O'Keefe, McVeigh, Bevan, Hannebery
Nil	Injuries	Bird (knee)
Nil	Reports	Nil

=== Round 16 ===
Round 16
Bye; Adelaide

=== Round 17 ===
Round 17
Friday, 15 July (8:10 pm)	Adelaide	def. by	Essendon	AAMI Stadium (crowd: 38,118)	Report
5.3 (33); 8.7 (55); 9.9 (63); 10.13 (73)	Q1; Q2; Q3; Final	0.2 (2); 2.7 (19); 6.11 (47); 12.12 (84)	Umpires: Stevic, Ryan, Mollison; Most DT Pts: Angus Monfries (Essendon), 102 pts Television broadcast: Seven Network
Dangerfield 3 Johncock, Wright 2 Petrenko, Jaensch, Moran 1	Goals	Hurley, Crameri 2 Monfries, Davey, Ryder, McVeigh, Reimers, Zaharakis, Colyer 1
Sloane, Jacobs, Wright, S. Thompson, Dangerfield, Petrenko	Best	Monfries, Zaharakis, Melksham, Davey, Stanton, Hocking
Jaensch (right shoulder), Johncock (left hip), Jacobs (left leg)	Injuries	Howlett (side strain)
Nil	Reports	Nil

=== Round 18 ===
Round 18
Friday, 22 July (7:40 pm)	St Kilda	def.	Adelaide	Etihad Stadium (crowd: 26,546)	Report
5.1 (31); 10.2 (62); 14.11 (95); 19.13 (127)	Q1; Q2; Q3; Final	1.2 (8); 2.5 (17); 2.6 (18); 3.6 (24)	Umpires: Vozzo, Farmer, McInerney; Most DT Pts: Nick Dal Santo (St Kilda), 140 pts Television broadcast: Seven Network
Milne 8 Schneider 5 Riewoldt 3 Dal Santo, Koschitzke, Montagna 1	Goals	Dangerfield, S. Thompson, Henderson 1
Milne, Goddard, Dal Santo, Schneider, Armitage, Jones	Best	S. Thompson, Doughty, Jacobs, Petrenko
Nil	Injuries	Symes (cheekbone), S. Thompson (leg)
Nil	Reports	Nil
Following the match, long-time coach Neil Craig resigned effective immediately. The match was his second largest loss as Adelaide coach.

=== Round 19 ===
Round 19 (Showdown)
Sunday, 31 July (4:10 pm)	Adelaide	def.	Port Adelaide	AAMI Stadium (crowd: 40,586)	Report
3.4 (22); 8.7 (55); 13.10 (88); 16.15 (111)	Q1; Q2; Q3; Final	1.5 (11); 4.9 (33); 9.10 (64); 11.13 (79)	Umpires: Margetts, Schmitt, Hay; Most DT Pts: Nathan van Berlo (Adelaide), 120 pts Television broadcast: Seven Network
Walker 4 Wright, Gunston, Sloane 2 Otten, Henderson, Jacobs, Doughty, Maric, Mackay 1	Goals	Hitchcock 3 Schulz, Ebert, C. Cornes 2 Westhoff, Thomas 1
van Berlo, Vince, S. Thompson, Sloane, Johncock, Walker, Dangerfield	Best	Boak, Pearce, Hitchcock, Cassisi, Hartlett, Gray
Nil	Injuries	Schulz (foot and back), Trengove (knee swelling), Logan (foot)
Nil	Reports	Nil
This was the first match of caretaker coach Mark Bickley, following the resignation of Neil Craig.

=== Round 20 ===
Round 20
Sunday, 7 August (1:10 pm)	Brisbane Lions	def. by	Adelaide	The Gabba (crowd: 17,930)	Report
5.1 (31); 11.6 (72); 14.7 (91); 16.9 (105)	Q1; Q2; Q3; Final	6.3 (39); 9.5 (59); 10.11 (71); 16.14 (110)	Umpires: Kamolins, Armstrong, McInerney; Most DT Pts: Scott Thompson (Adelaide)/Tom Rockliff (Brisbane Lions), 138 pts Television broadcast: Fox Sports
Cornelius 4 McGrath 3 Clark, Karnezis 2 Rockliff, Hanley, Polkinghorne, Leuenberger, Banfield 1	Goals	Walker 4 Gunston 3 Johncock, van Berlo, Wright 2 Henderson, Jacobs, Riley 1
Rockliff, Black, Hanley, Staker, Cornelius, McGrath	Best	S. Thompson, van Berlo, Gunston, Jacobs, Sloane
Patfull (hand)	Injuries	Knights (hip)
Nil	Reports	Nil

=== Round 21 ===
Round 21
Sunday, 14 August (4:10 pm)	Adelaide	def. by	Geelong	AAMI Stadium (crowd: 33,576)	Report
2.3 (15); 5.6 (36); 8.10 (58); 12.13 (85)	Q1; Q2; Q3; Final	2.3 (15); 8.7 (55); 11.10 (76); 14.12 (96)	Umpires: Stewart, Nicholls, Hay; Most DT Pts: Nathan van Berlo (Adelaide), 102 pts Television broadcast: Fox Sports
Walker 3 Maric, Wright, Petrenko, Henderson 2 Dangerfield 1	Goals	Podsiadly, Johnson, Byrnes 2 Duncan, Chapman, Mooney, Bartel, Wojcinski, Ottens, Stokes, Selwood 1
Sloane, van Berlo, Wright, Knights, Doughty, Johncock, Talia, Vince	Best	Kelly, Johnson, Podsiadly, Bartel, Enright, Hunt
Nil	Injuries	Vardy (hip)
McKernan (tripping)	Reports	Mooney (front-on contact)

=== Round 22 ===
Round 22
Saturday, 20 August (2:10 pm)	Gold Coast	def. by	Adelaide	Metricon Stadium (crowd: 16,168)	Report
2.2 (14); 5.7 (37); 8.8 (56); 9.10 (64)	Q1; Q2; Q3; Final	9.4 (58); 10.7 (67); 11.11 (77); 18.17 (125)	Umpires: Nicholls, Armstrong, Jennings; Most DT Pts: Scott Thompson (Adelaide), 151 pts Television broadcast: Fox Sports
Shaw, McKenzie 2 G. Ablett, Bennell, Hickey, Russell, Thompson 1	Goals	Walker, Tippett 4 Gunston, Mackay, Petrenko 2 van Berlo, Sloane, Wright, Douglas 1
Bock, G. Ablett, Stanley, Bennell, Prestia, Thompson	Best	S. Thompson, van Berlo, Sloane, Dangerfield, Petrenko, Jacobs
Nil	Injuries	Iles (hip) replaced by Daye
Nil	Reports	Nil

=== Round 23 ===
Round 23
Sunday, 28 August (12:40 pm)	Adelaide	def. by	Richmond	AAMI Stadium (crowd: 38,023)	Report
7.3 (45); 9.6 (60); 12.9 (81); 15.9 (99)	Q1; Q2; Q3; Final	5.2 (32); 6.8 (44); 12.13 (85); 17.19 (121)	Umpires: Grun, Dalgleish, Wenn; Most DT Pts: Bernie Vince (Adelaide), 144 pts Television broadcast: Fox Sports
Gunston 5 Vince, van Berlo, Tippett 2 S. Thompson, Douglas, Wright, Walker 1	Goals	Vickery 4 Nahas 3 Miller, Martin 2 Morton, Jackson, Graham, Riewoldt, King, Cotchin 1
van Berlo, Vince, Dangerfield, S. Thompson, Gunston, Rutten	Best	Vickery, Martin, Cotchin, Rance, Houli, Nahas, Jackson, Deledio
Doughty (illness) replaced by Martin, Dangerfield (right shoulder)	Injuries	Vickery (right shoulder)
Nil	Reports	Nil

=== Round 24 ===
Round 24
Saturday, 3 September (5:10 pm)	West Coast	def.	Adelaide	Patersons Stadium (crowd: 36,062)	Report
2.5 (17); 10.6 (66); 14.9 (93); 22.13 (145)	Q1; Q2; Q3; Final	0.0 (0); 2.0 (12); 4.4 (28); 7.8 (50)	Umpires: Farmer, Dalgleish, McInerney; Most DT Pts: Scott Thompson (Adelaide), 128 pts Television broadcast: Fox Sports
Nicoski 3, Lynch 3, S. Selwood 3 Naitanui, Shuey, LeCras, Cox, Masten 2 Kennedy, Embley, Ebert 1	Goals	Walker 2 Tippett, Petrenko, Vince, Johncock, S. Thompson 1
Embley, Shuey, Naitanui, Cox, Priddis, Masten, Glass	Best	S. Thompson, van Berlo, Douglas, Johncock
Smith (hamstring)	Injuries	Armstrong (ankle)
Nil	Reports	Nil

== Ladder ==
2011 AFL ladder
Pos	Team	Pld	W	L	D	PF	PA	PP	Pts	
1	Collingwood	22	20	2	0	2592	1546	167.7	80	Finals series
2	Geelong (P)	22	19	3	0	2548	1619	157.4	76	Finals series
3	Hawthorn	22	18	4	0	2355	1634	144.1	72	Finals series
4	West Coast	22	17	5	0	2235	1715	130.3	68	Finals series
5	Carlton	22	14	7	1	2225	1700	130.9	58	Finals series
6	St Kilda	22	12	9	1	1891	1677	112.8	50	Finals series
7	Sydney	22	12	9	1	1897	1735	109.3	50	Finals series
8	Essendon	22	11	10	1	2217	2217	100.0	46	Finals series
9	North Melbourne	22	10	12	0	2106	2082	101.2	40	
10	Western Bulldogs	22	9	13	0	2060	2155	95.6	36	
11	Fremantle	22	9	13	0	1791	2155	83.1	36	
12	Richmond	22	8	13	1	2069	2396	86.4	34	
13	Melbourne	22	8	13	1	1974	2315	85.3	34	
14	Adelaide	22	7	15	0	1742	2193	79.4	28	
15	Brisbane Lions	22	4	18	0	1814	2240	81.0	16	
16	Port Adelaide	22	3	19	0	1718	2663	64.5	12	
17	Gold Coast	22	3	19	0	1534	2726	56.3	12	

Source: AFL ladder
Rules for classification: 1) points; 2) percentage; 3) number of points for.
(P) Premiers
