= Van Berlo =

van Berlo is a surname. Notable people with the surname include:

- Diana van Berlo (born 1966), Dutch singer
- Jay van Berlo (born 1988), Australian rules footballer
- Kay van Berlo (born 2000), Dutch racing driver
- Nathan van Berlo (born 1986), Australian rules footballer
