= Will Young (Australian footballer) =

Australian rules football player (born 1990)

Personal information
- Full name: Will Young
- Born: 3 August 1990 (age 36); Bungaree, Australia
- Original team: North Ballarat Rebels (TAC Cup)
- Draft: 72nd overall, 2008 AFL draft Adelaide; 58th, 2011 Rookie Draft, Adelaide
- Height: 194 cm (6 ft 4 in)
- Weight: 88 kg (194 lb)
- Position: Utility

Playing career^{1}
Years	Club	Games (Goals)
2010	Adelaide	2 (1)
- ^{1} Playing statistics correct to the end of 2010.

Will Young (born 3 August 1990) is an Australian rules football player who played for the Adelaide Football Club in the Australian Football League (AFL). Young was taken late in the 2008 AFL draft, with Adelaide's fifth-round pick at number 72.

Young represented Vic Country in the 2008 AFL Under 18 Championships. Vic Country coach Robert Hyde said after the carnival that "He missed a couple of games through injury but I remember our first game against Vic Metro – we only just got rolled – he was probably close to our best player. His attack on the ball was terrific."

Young was recruited from the North Ballarat Rebels and after moving to South Australia, he was selected in the Mini Draft by Norwood at pick 6, and quickly cemented a spot in the team's defence. Injury interrupted Young's first year in senior football, but worked his way back into the league side later in the season.

He made his debut for Adelaide in round 2, 2010 in a home game against the Sydney Swans. Young came into the selected squad for Nathan van Berlo who pulled out due to back soreness. He had a forgettable game, conceding six goals to Sydney's Ben McGlynn, but made a successful return to the side in round 21 against Collingwood, kicking his first goal in AFL football in a 3-point loss.

After not playing a game in 2011, largely through injury, Young was delisted by Adelaide at the end of the season but was invited back to train at the club during the offseason and was re-drafted in the 2011 AFL Rookie Draft with Adelaide's fourth pick, number 58 overall.
