= Brent Reilly =

Australian rules footballer, born 1983

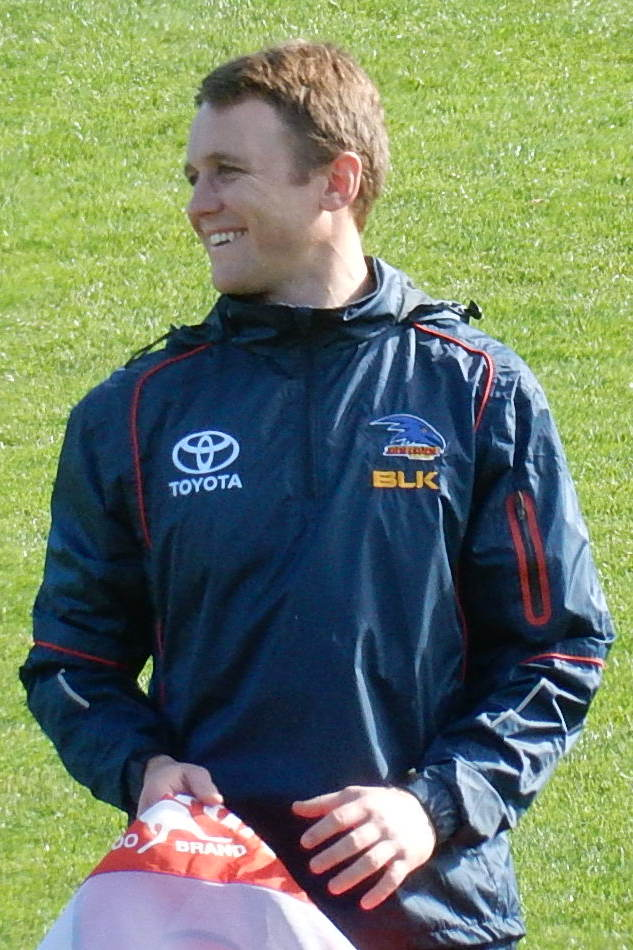
- Reilly in July 2015

Personal information
- Full name: Brent Reilly
- Nickname: Radar
- Born: 12 November 1983 (age 42)
- Original teams: Gisborne; Calder Cannons (TAC Cup)
- Draft: No. 12, 2001 National Draft, Adelaide
- Debut: Round 15, 2002, Adelaide vs. St Kilda, at Football Park
- Height: 183 cm (6 ft 0 in)
- Weight: 85 kg (13 st 5 lb; 187 lb)
- Position: Small defender, midfielder, tagger

Playing career^{1}
Years	Club	Games (Goals)
2002–2015	Adelaide	203 (52)
- ^{1} Playing statistics correct to the end of 2014.

Career highlights
- 2004 AFL Rising Star nominee

Brent Reilly (born 12 November 1983) is a former Australian rules footballer who played for the Adelaide Football Club in the Australian Football League (AFL). He was recruited by the club with draft pick #12 in the 2001 National Draft. He retired on 13 May 2015 after suffering a fractured skull in a training mishap earlier in the year. He played 203 games for the Crows.

== AFL career ==
Debuting in 2002 as an 18-year-old, Reilly took his time to develop, struggling to retain his spot in the side under the coaching of Gary Ayres. The appointment of Neil Craig as coach in mid-2004 significantly helped his development, with the youngster beginning to earn selection on a consistent basis, and winning the club's first AFL Rising Star nomination for four years in round 16 against Fremantle. He played every home-and-away game in the 2005 season and the first final, before missing the last two with a hamstring injury, and ever since he has been a regular in the Crows' 22, renowned for his long and accurate kicking.

In 2009, with many younger players pressing their claims for selection, Reilly was one of a number of players with their places in the side under pressure, being dropped a number of times. However, he responded with a string of strong performances, and again entrenched himself in the Crows' best side. With the departure of Robert Shirley at the end of the season, Reilly began to make his name in 2010 in a new role as a tagger, most notably in the club's upset victory over Geelong, in which he kept superstar Gary Ablett to only 19 possessions.

Reilly played his 150th game against St Kilda in round 18, 2011, in what was to be Neil Craig's final game as coach. Late in the season he was trialled as a rebounding defender, a role that he continued in 2012 to great effect, being named in the 40-man All-Australian squad for that year. In Round 14, 2013 Reilly injured his shoulder, requiring a full reconstruction that ended his season and curtailed his preparation for the next season.

Reilly played 10 games in 2014, including his 200th match against North Melbourne in round 13.

== Statistics ==
'

Legend
G	Goals	K	Kicks	D	Disposals	T	Tackles
B	Behinds	H	Handballs	M	Marks

Season	Team	No.	Games	Totals							Averages (per game)						
Season	Team	No.	Games	G	B	K	H	D	M	T	G	B	K	H	D	M	T
2002	Adelaide	33	1	0	0	0	1	1	0	1	0.0	0.0	0.0	1.0	1.0	0.0	1.0
2003	Adelaide	33	6	4	6	30	16	46	19	2	0.7	1.0	5.0	2.7	7.7	3.2	0.3
2004	Adelaide	33	14	1	3	130	57	187	58	25	0.1	0.2	9.3	4.1	13.4	4.1	1.8
2005	Adelaide	33	23	11	6	187	110	297	82	45	0.5	0.3	8.1	4.8	12.9	3.6	2.0
2006	Adelaide	33	24	14	14	284	124	408	117	85	0.6	0.6	11.8	5.2	17.0	4.9	3.5
2007	Adelaide	33	17	7	5	220	101	321	81	41	0.4	0.3	12.9	5.9	18.9	4.8	2.4
2008	Adelaide	33	8	2	2	80	51	131	31	20	0.3	0.3	10.0	6.4	16.4	3.9	2.5
2009	Adelaide	3	20	3	7	212	183	395	88	55	0.2	0.4	10.6	9.2	19.8	4.4	2.8
2010	Adelaide	3	22	1	8	245	188	433	99	104	0.0	0.4	11.1	8.5	19.7	4.5	4.7
2011	Adelaide	3	21	5	4	220	198	418	74	98	0.2	0.2	10.5	9.4	19.9	3.5	4.7
2012	Adelaide	3	25	2	2	350	141	491	150	67	0.1	0.1	14.0	5.6	19.6	6.0	2.7
2013	Adelaide	3	12	2	1	124	73	197	51	28	0.2	0.1	10.3	6.1	16.4	4.3	2.3
2014	Adelaide	3	10	0	0	130	63	193	65	19	0.0	0.0	13.0	6.3	19.3	6.5	1.9
Career			203	52	58	2212	1306	3518	915	590	0.3	0.3	10.9	6.4	17.3	4.5	2.9
