= Michael Avon =

Australian rules football field umpire

Personal information
- Born: 23 October 1974 (age 52); Adelaide, South Australia

Umpiring career
Years	League	Role	Games
1997–2010	AFL	Field Umpire	179
1995–2014	SANFL	Field Umpire	223

Career highlights
- SANFL Grand Finals 1996, 1998, 2012, 2013; AFL Finals - Port Adelaide v Collingwood 2002 QF; State Games - 1997, 2012, 2013; AFL Debut 1997 = Port Adelaide v Adelaide (Showdown 1); Anzac Day Essendon v Collingwood 2010; 200th SANFL Match (SANFL Life Membership) 2012; AFLUA Life Member 2009; AFL 200 Club Member

Michael Avon (October 1974) was an Australian rules football field umpire in the Australian Football League.

Avon umpired 179 AFL matches based out of South Australia, umpiring his last AFL game in 2010. He umpired the blockbuster Essendon v Collingwood ANZAC Day match in the same year.

In 2011, Avon returned to the South Australian National Football League (SANFL) and in 2012, he umpired his 3rd SANFL Grand Final, alongside Leigh Haussen and Curtis Deboy. Avon had previously umpired the 1996 and 1998 SANFL Grand Finals, a 14 year-gap between his last two finals.

In 2012, Michael umpired his 200th SANFL game in the match between Central District and Glenelg, giving him SANFL Life Membership, This feat was made even more notable given the length of his AFL umpiring career. Avon finished the 2013 season umpiring 2013 SANFL Grand Final again with Haussen and Deboy.
