= Ben Speight =

Australian rules footballer (born 1990)

Personal information
- Full name: Benjamin Speight
- Born: 2 May 1990 (age 36)
- Original team: Hope Valley / Norwood
- Draft: No. 40 2009 Rookie: North Melbourne
- Height: 186 cm (6 ft 1 in)
- Weight: 84 kg (185 lb)

Playing career^{1}
Years	Club	Games (Goals)
2010–2013	North Melbourne	10 (7)
- ^{1} Playing statistics correct to the end of 2013.

Ben Speight is an Australian rules footballer who played for North Melbourne in the Australian Football League. He was drafted with the 40th selection in the 2009 Rookie draft and was elevated to their senior list at the end of the 2010 season.

Ben Speight was delisted from North Melbourne at the end of the 2012 season after failing to play a senior match in 2012
