= Neil Craig =

Australian rules footballer, born 1956

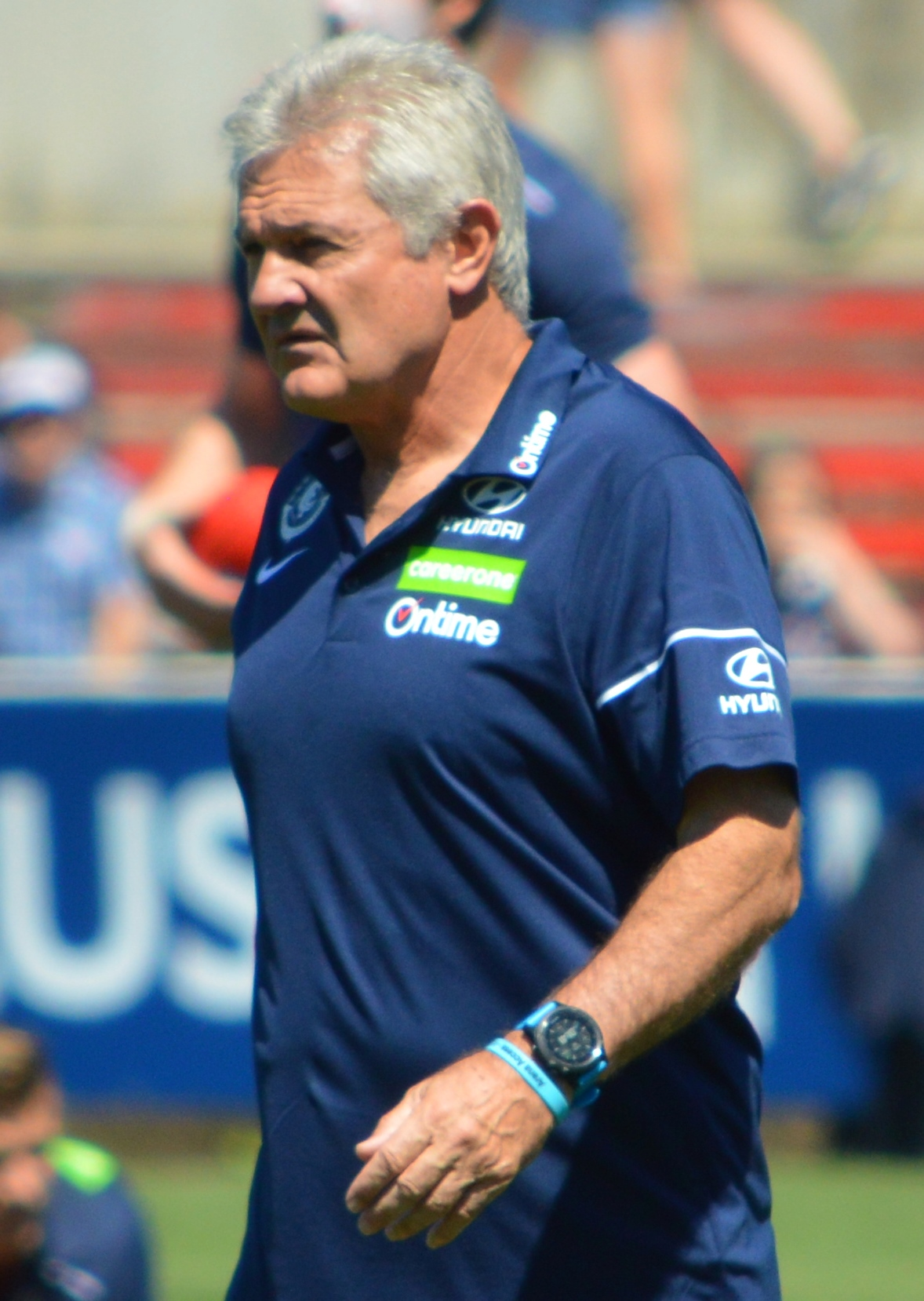
- Craig in March 2017

Personal information
- Full name: Neil Passmore Craig
- Born: 11 January 1956 (age 70)
- Draft: No. 2, 1981 interstate draft

Playing career^{1}
| Years | Club | Games (Goals) |
| 1973–1979 | Norwood | 126 (109) |
| 1980–1986 | Sturt | 134 (86) |
| 1987–1990 | North Adelaide | 61 (25) |
| Total | | 321 (220) |

Coaching career^{3}
| Years | Club | Games (W–L–D) |
| 2004–2011 | Adelaide | 166 (92–74–0) |
| 2013 | Melbourne | 11 (1–10–0) |
| Total | | 177 (93–84–0) |
- ^{1} Playing statistics correct to the end of 1990.^{3} Coaching statistics correct as of 2013.

Career highlights
- 2× SANFL Premiership player: 1975, 1978; Norwood Club Champion: 1977; Sturt captain: 1985–1986; AFLCA Coach of the Year: 2005; South Australian Football Hall of Fame, inducted 2002; Adelaide life membership, inducted 2021; AFL life membership, inducted 2024

Neil Passmore Craig (born 11 January 1956) is a former Australian rules footballer and coach. He is best known as being coach of the Adelaide Football Club from 2004 to 2011. He also notably served as caretaker coach of the Melbourne Football Club in 2013.

As a player Craig played for the Norwood Football Club, Sturt Football Club and the North Adelaide Football Club in the South Australian National Football League (SANFL).

== Playing career ==
Craig played a total of 319 games (and kicked 220 goals) in the South Australian National Football League (SANFL) as well as 11 State of Origin matches for South Australia.

He played 126 games for the Norwood Football Club, debuting as a 17-year-old in 1973. He was a part of their premiership sides in 1975 and 1978, before leaving the club after the 1979 season.

Craig played 134 games for Sturt (captaining the side in 1985 and 1986) between 1980 and 1986 and was also captain of South Australia in 1984.

He moved to North Adelaide, where he finished his career, playing 61 games between 1987 and 1990. At one stage of his career, Craig was pursued by Footscray, a Victorian team in the Victorian Football League (VFL), but declined the offer as he preferred to stay in South Australia. At that time there was a great rivalry between the VFL and SANFL and both competitions considered themselves the best in Australia.

== Post-playing career and coaching career ==
In 1991, Craig became the coach of Norwood, a position he held until 1995. In 2002, he was inducted into the South Australian Football Hall of Fame.

=== Fitness advising ===
Craig hails from a fitness background and holds a sports science degree.

He has worked with the Australian cycling team at the Olympic Games and with the South Australian Institute of Sport as a senior sports scientist. He has worked under cycling legend Charlie Walsh at the Australian Cycling Federation (where he was sports science co-ordinator) and also recruited Walsh as part of the Crows' AFL coaching panel.

=== Adelaide ===
In 1997, Craig took up the position of fitness adviser with the Adelaide Football Club. He is credited with helping devise the fitness regime that led the Crows to back-to-back premierships in 1997 and 1998 in which players were trained harder mid-season in order to reach peak fitness during finals matches.

Craig left the club in 1999 to help the Australian Olympic cycling team prepare for the 2000 Sydney Olympic Games but returned in 2001 to be an assistant coach under Gary Ayres. In late 2001 he was the favourite for the West Coast Eagles coaching job in 2002 but dropped out of the running. He took over the senior coaching position at the Crows in 2004 as caretaker when Ayres left the club after Round 13. He was then appointed full-time for the 2005 season and immediately led the Crows to their first minor premiership in 2005, and took the team to two successive preliminary finals in his first two years as senior coach in 2005 and 2006, losing and being eliminated by West Coast Eagles twice. Under Craig, the Crows reached the finals for five consecutive years but achieved limited success, leaving him with a finals' coaching record of three wins and six losses. The club under Craig had a disappointing 2010 season when Adelaide finished eleventh with nine wins and thirteen losses, therefore missing out of the finals. After another disappointing 2011 season, when Adelaide under Craig sat fourteenth on the ladder with four wins and twelve losses, Craig resigned as senior coach of the Adelaide Crows on 25 July 2011 after a 103-point loss to St Kilda in Round 18. He left the club as the longest-serving coach in the Crows' history. Craig was then replaced by assistant coach Mark Bickley as caretaker senior coach for the rest of the 2011 season.

=== Melbourne ===
After his resignation as Adelaide Football Club senior coach, Craig was signed as the Director of Sports Performance at the Melbourne Football Club on 29 September 2011, beginning in the 2012 season. His primary role was mentoring and assisting the players of the club, in particular the younger players, and to mentor and assist the other assistant coaches, including an assistant coach.

Despite the off-season acquisitions of several experienced players, such as Shannon Byrnes, Tom Gillies, Chris Dawes and David Rodan, the Demons underachieved in the first half of 2013 AFL season, managing just 1 win in their first 11 games. As the result of this poor start to the 2013 season, after the Demons' mid-season bye on 17 June 2013, the Demons' senior coach, Mark Neeld, was sacked. His sacking came within weeks of the departures of senior Demons' staff members Cameron Schwab and Don McLardy. Subsequently, Craig was appointed as the caretaker senior coach of the Demons for the remainder of the 2013 season. Craig coached the Demons for 11 games, managing just 1 win, for a winning percentage of just 9%. Craig left the club after the completion of the 2013 season with former Sydney Swans premiership senior coach Paul Roos taking over the senior coaching role at the end of the season.

=== Essendon ===
On 10 October 2013, Craig was appointed to the newly created role of head of coaching development and strategy at the Essendon Football Club and then on 15 April 2014, he was promoted to the position of General Manager, Performance. In this role Craig oversaw all team performance functions including coaching, development and high performance which meant that the coaching staff reported to him.

=== Carlton ===
On 30 September 2015, Craig was appointed to Brendon Bolton's new coaching panel at the Carlton Football Club, taking on the role of Director of Coaching, Development and Performance. On 14 August 2017, it was announced that he would retire from his career in the football industry at the end of the 2017 season.

=== England rugby union team ===
From October 2017, Craig worked as "a consultant for highest performance to look how we operate and see how we can improve" with the England national rugby union team. Areas of focus included leadership, communication and teamwork. Part of his role was also to be a 'critical friend' to head coach Eddie Jones whom he had worked with previously. The team reached the final of the 2019 World Cup.

=== Gold Coast Suns ===
In December 2019, Craig joined the Gold Coast Suns in a part-time consultancy role for the coaching group. This involved a game day bench role in the 2021 season.

=== Australia rugby union team ===
Craig followed Eddie Jones from the English rugby union team to the Wallabies, holding a similar support role in 2023.

== Head coaching record ==
| Team | Year | Home and Away Season | | | | | Finals | | | |
| Team | Year | Won | Lost | Drew | Win % | Position | Won | Lost | Win % | Result |
|---|---|---|---|---|---|---|---|---|---|---|
| ADE | 2004 | 4 (Note: Craig took over as interim head coach after Gary Ayres resigned following round 13 with a record of 4–9, leading the Crows to a 4–5 record and earning the job full-time. Thus, the first 13 games are credited to Ayres and the final 9 to Craig.) | 5 | 0 | .444 | 12th out of 16 | — | — | — | — |
| ADE | 2005 | 17 | 5 | 0 | .773 | 1st out of 16 | 1 | 2 | .333 | Lost to West Coast in Preliminary Final |
| ADE | 2006 | 16 | 6 | 0 | .727 | 2nd out of 16 | 1 | 1 | .500 | Lost to West Coast in Preliminary Final |
| ADE | 2007 | 12 | 10 | 0 | .545 | 8th out of 16 | 0 | 1 | .000 | Lost to Hawthorn in Elimination Final |
| ADE | 2008 | 13 | 9 | 0 | .591 | 5th out of 16 | 0 | 1 | .000 | Lost to Collingwood in Elimination Final |
| ADE | 2009 | 14 | 8 | 0 | .636 | 5th out of 16 | 1 | 1 | .500 | Lost to Collingwood in Semi Final |
| ADE | 2010 | 9 | 13 | 0 | .409 | 11th out of 16 | — | — | — | — |
| ADE | 2011 | 4 (Note: Craig resigned on 25 July 2011 following a 103-point shellacking at the hands of St Kilda in round 18 which dropped the Crows to 4–12 for the season. Interim coach Mark Bickley coached out the remainder of the season with a 3–3 record. Thus, the first 16 games are credited to Craig and the final six to Bickley.) | 12 | 0 | .250 | (resigned after R18) | — | — | — | — |
| ADE Total | | 89 | 68 | 0 | .567 | | 3 | 6 | .333 | |
| MEL | 2013 | 1 (Note: Craig took over as interim head coach after Mark Neeld was sacked following the Demons' mid-season bye with a record of 1–10, leading Melbourne to a record of 1–10 across the second half of the season and narrowly avoiding the wooden spoon with a 17th-place finish. Thus, the first 11 games are credited to Neeld and the final 11 to Craig.) | 10 | 0 | .091 | 17th out of 18 | — | — | — | — |
| MEL Total | | 1 | 10 | 0 | .091 | | 0 | 0 | .000 | |
| Total | | 90 | 78 | 0 | .536 | | 3 | 6 | .333 | |
