= Scott Stevens (footballer) =

Australian rules footballer (born 1982)

Personal information
- Full name: Scott Stevens
- Born: 15 January 1982 (age 44); Perth, Western Australia
- Original team: Perth (WAFL)
- Draft: 21st overall, 1999; Sydney
- Height: 195 cm (6 ft 5 in)
- Weight: 87 kg (192 lb)
- Position: Utility

Playing career^{1}
Years	Club	Games (Goals)
2000–2003	Sydney	25 (17)
2004–2011	Adelaide	119 (71)
Total		144 (88)
- ^{1} Playing statistics correct to the end of 2011.

Scott Stevens (born 15 January 1982 in Perth, Western Australia) is a former Australian rules footballer in the Australian Football League (AFL). He attended Wesley College, Perth and played junior level football with Perth in the West Australian Football League (WAFL) before being recruited to the Sydney Swans. Stevens failed to play a match in his first two seasons with Sydney and finally made his AFL debut in 2002.

After four years on Sydney's list, Stevens was traded to the Adelaide Crows for the 2004 season. After a solid first year at his new club, foot and shoulder injuries kept him sidelined for the entire 2005 season and 2006 pre-season. He returned to the side in Round 2 but did not perform and was dropped again. In round 7, however, he was given another chance and this time succeeded in becoming a regular player, playing all bar one of the remaining games and averaging over 18 disposals at centre half-back.

Stevens played every game in 2007, stationed in a variety of positions. However, former Adelaide coach Malcolm Blight criticised Stevens' skills when under pressure. In 2008, Stevens capped off another consistent season by coming eighth in the AFC Club Champion award, and kicking six goals in the elimination final loss to Collingwood.

In 2009, Stevens continued to be a reliable member of the Adelaide side. The absence of regular centre half-back Nathan Bock through suspension and injury led to Stevens being played more in defence, a role that Stevens performed admirably, and he was able to kick goals when required in the forward line.

In round 3 of the 2011 season Stevens suffered a concussion injury. Stevens retired on 21 June 2011 due to the cumulative effects of numerous concussions.

Due to his unpredictable and unconventional playing style, Stevens was immensely popular among most AFC fans. Many considered him to be a cult hero at the time of his retirement in 2011.
