= Myke Cook =

Australian rules footballer

Personal information
- Full name: Michael John Kileen Cook
- Born: 9 October 1989 (age 37); Victoria, Australia
- Original team: Sandringham Dragons (TAC Cup)
- Draft: 38th overall, 2007; Adelaide
- Height: 184 cm (6 ft 0 in)
- Weight: 77 kg (170 lb)
- Position: Midfield

Playing career^{1}
Years	Club	Games (Goals)
2009–2011	Adelaide	14 (2)
- ^{1} Playing statistics correct to the end of 2011.

Myke Cook is an Australian rules footballer who played for the Adelaide Football Club in the Australian Football League (AFL).

Originally from the Sandringham Dragons in the under 19s TAC Cup, Cook was drafted by Adelaide at number 38 in the 2007 AFL draft.

Cook spent the 2008 AFL season playing with South Adelaide in the South Australian National Football League (SANFL) before making his AFL debut against Collingwood in Round One, 2009. He had the opportunity to kick a goal in his first AFL game after taking a contested mark in front of goals late in the game, but missed a relatively easy shot. He played two further games in his debut season, before beginning to secure a more regular berth in Adelaide's first 22 in 2010. Cook kicked his first goal in AFL football in his sixth game, against Melbourne, in Round Three, 2010, a snap around the body with only seconds remaining in the first quarter.

Cook was delisted by the Crows at the end of the 2011 AFL season and returned to the Sandringham Zebras in the Victorian Football League (VFL) with the hope of returning to the AFL.
