= Dean Margetts =

Australian rules football umpire

Dean Margetts (born 3 June 1974) is an Australian rules football field umpire in the Australian Football League. He has umpired over 300 career games in the AFL. He began his umpiring career with the South Suburban Junior Football Umpires Association (SSJFUA) which has been renamed now as the Demons District Football Umpiring Association (DDFUA), in Western Australia.

In May 2022, Margetts appeared on the AFL-centred YouTube channel BackChat, hosted by Will Schofield and Dan Const, to discuss umpiring games of AFL.
