= Troy Pannell =

Australian rules football field umpire

Personal information
- Nickname: T-Pain
- Height: 185 cm (6 ft 1 in)

Umpiring career
Years	League	Role	Games
2005–2018	AFL	Field umpire	219

Troy Pannell is a former Australian rules football field umpire who officiated in the Australian Football League (AFL). In a career which began in 2005 and ended in 2018, he umpired 219 games in the AFL. In 2004, before officiating at the top level, he was awarded the Golden Whistle by the New South Wales Australian Football Umpires Association.

In 2012, Pannell was appointed to his first final, the Elimination Final between Geelong and Fremantle at the MCG. He umpired his 150th game during the 2014 AFL finals series, a Preliminary Final between Sydney and North Melbourne.

In 2014, Pannell was knocked out while umpiring a game between Sydney and Essendon after clashing heads with Sydney player Nick Malceski. Fans were criticised for booing Pannell as he was taken off the ground for treatment.

He retired from the AFL panel at the end of the 2018 season. In May 2025, it was reported that Pannell was wanted by a Victorian court over allegations that he masterminded a scheme to defraud the shipping company SeaRoad out of $8.7 million by generating fake invoices for repairs on shipping containers which were never performed.
