= Brad Symes =

Australian rules footballer

Personal information
- Full name: Bradley Thomas Symes
- Born: 7 March 1985 (age 41); Adelaide, Australia
- Original team: Central District (SANFL)
- Draft: 30th overall, 2003; Port Adelaide
- Height: 187 cm (6 ft 2 in)
- Weight: 82 kg (181 lb)
- Positions: Midfield, Half-back

Playing career^{1}
Years	Club	Games (Goals)
2004–2007	Port Adelaide	20 (2)
2008–2012	Adelaide	60 (6)
Total		80 (8)
- ^{1} Playing statistics correct to the end of 2012.

Career highlights
- Magarey Medal: 2012

Bradley Thomas Symes (born 7 March 1985) is a former professional Australian rules footballer who played for the Port Adelaide Football Club and Adelaide Football Club in the Australian Football League (AFL).

== AFL career ==
=== Port Adelaide career (2004–2007) ===
He made his Australian Football League (AFL) debut for Port Adelaide in Round 8, 2004. Despite solid performances for his South Australian National Football League (SANFL) club, Central District, Symes struggled to get an AFL game for Port Adelaide. His form was finally rewarded in 2006, in which he impressed greatly with his composure and skills and received a nomination for the 2006 AFL Rising Star Award for his round nine match against Essendon, and kicked his first goal in Round 13, 2006 against Melbourne after a trademark tackle on Jared Rivers that won him a free kick close to goal.

Symes drifted back in the pecking order in 2007, playing only seven games despite continued good performances in the SANFL. He was called up for the 2007 AFL Grand Final after veteran defender Michael Wilson snapped his Achilles tendon in the previous game, but Port Adelaide had a largely forgettable day, losing to Geelong by 119 points.

=== Adelaide career (2008–2012) ===
The following Sunday, (after the loss) he played in a successful grand final for Central District in the SANFL, but remained disgruntled by his lack of opportunities in the AFL. As a likely result of this, he was traded to the Adelaide Crows in exchange for draft pick No. 28 on Friday 12 October, the final day of the AFL trade week.

Initially in and out of the team, by 2009 Symes had developed into a regular member of the Adelaide Crows' lineup, playing as a running defender. He was best known for his run off half back and through the centre, an integral part of Adelaide's play, and for his ferocious tackling.

In 2012, Symes only played two games for Adelaide, but had a standout year in the SANFL, jointly winning the Magarey Medal with South Adelaide Football Club's Joel Cross with 18 votes, although Symes' teammate James Boyd polled the most votes (26), but was ineligible due to a two-week suspension for striking.

He was delisted from Adelaide in September 2012.

== Statistics ==
Statistics are correct to end of 2012 season.

Legend
G	Goals	K	Kicks	D	Disposals	T	Tackles
B	Behinds	H	Handballs	M	Marks

Season	Team	No.	Games	Totals							Averages (per game)						
Season	Team	No.	Games	G	B	K	H	D	M	T	G	B	K	H	D	M	T
2004	Port Adelaide	23	1	0	0	2	1	3	1	0	0.0	0.0	2.0	1.0	3.0	1.0	0.0
2005	Port Adelaide	23	0	0	0	0	0	0	0	0	0	0	0	0	0	0	0
2006	Port Adelaide	23	12	1	1	123	123	246	95	34	0.1	0.1	10.2	10.2	20.5	7.9	2.8
2007	Port Adelaide	23	7	1	1	59	51	110	36	17	0.1	0.1	8.4	7.3	15.7	5.1	2.4
2008	Adelaide	15	16	2	5	147	182	329	75	60	0.1	0.3	9.2	11.4	20.6	4.7	3.8
2009	Adelaide	15	20	3	6	181	243	424	104	67	0.2	0.3	12.2	9.0	21.2	5.2	3.4
2010	Adelaide	15	11	1	1	110	131	241	59	44	0.1	0.1	10.0	11.9	21.9	5.4	4.0
2011	Adelaide	15	11	0	0	100	91	191	56	32	0.0	0.0	9.1	8.3	17.4	5.1	2.9
2012	Adelaide	15	2	0	0	3	10	13	2	3	0.0	0.0	1.5	5.0	6.5	1.0	1.5
Career			80	8	14	725	832	1557	428	257	0.1	0.2	9.1	10.4	19.5	5.4	3.2
