= Luke Thompson (Australian footballer) =

Australian rules footballer (born 1991)

Personal information
- Full name: Luke Thompson
- Born: 8 February 1991 (age 35); Wangaratta, Victoria
- Original team: Geelong Falcons
- Draft: 17th overall, 2010, Adelaide
- Height: 194 cm (6 ft 4 in)
- Weight: 88 kg (194 lb)
- Position: Defender

Playing career^{1}
Years	Club	Games (Goals)
2011–2014	Adelaide	20 (2)
- ^{1} Playing statistics correct to the end of 2014.

Career highlights
- SANFL premiership player: 2020, 2021

Luke Thompson (born 8 February 1991) is an Australian rules footballer who played for the Adelaide Football Club in the Australian Football League.

He was drafted in 2010 by the Adelaide Crows as their 1st pick in the rookie draft. He played as a defender but could also play up forward if needed. He had worn three guernsey numbers 1, 28 and 6. He was delisted at the conclusion of the 2014 AFL season.

== Statistics ==
Statistics are correct to the end of the 2014 season

Legend
G	Goals	K	Kicks	D	Disposals	T	Tackles
B	Behinds	H	Handballs	M	Marks

Season	Team	No.	Games	Totals							Averages (per game)						
Season	Team	No.	Games	G	B	K	H	D	M	T	G	B	K	H	D	M	T
2011	Adelaide	28	11	2	2	75	71	146	51	19	0.2	0.2	6.8	6.4	13.3	4.6	1.7
2012	Adelaide	6	3	0	0	17	18	35	9	7	0.0	0.0	5.7	6.0	11.7	3.0	2.3
2013	Adelaide	6	0	—	—	—	—	—	—	—	—	—	—	—	—	—	—
2014	Adelaide	6	6	0	0	27	27	54	27	14	0.0	0.0	4.5	4.5	9.0	4.5	2.3
Career			20	2	2	119	116	235	77	40	0.1	0.1	6.0	5.8	11.8	3.9	2.0
