= Luke Farmer =

Australian rules football field umpire

Luke Farmer (born 25 September 1980) is an Australian rules football field umpire in the Australian Football League. He has umpired 185 career games in the AFL, including 5 finals. He debuted in a Round 1 match between Adelaide and Essendon at AAMI Stadium on 1 April 2007.

He is currently Head of Health and Physical Education at Christ Church Grammar School, Western Australia, and has a Bachelor of Science and a Diploma in Education.
