= Matthew Jaensch =

Australian rules footballer (born 1989)

Personal information
- Born: 18 September 1989 (age 37); Hahndorf, South Australia, Australia
- Original teams: Hahndorf (HFL); Sturt (SANFL)
- Draft: No. 46, 2009 Rookie Draft, Adelaide; No. 97 (RP), 2010 National Draft, Adelaide
- Debut: Round 6, 2010, Adelaide vs. Port Adelaide, at AAMI Stadium
- Height: 180 cm (5 ft 11 in)
- Weight: 82 kg (12 st 13 lb; 181 lb)
- Position: Small defender, small forward

Playing career^{1}
Years	Club	Games (Goals)
2010–2016	Adelaide	74 (25)
- ^{1} Playing statistics correct to the end of 2016.

Matthew Jaensch (born 18 September 1989) is a former professional Australian rules football player for the Adelaide Football Club in the Australian Football League (AFL). Jaensch was Adelaide's third selection in the 2009 Rookie Draft, taken at pick #46.

== Pre-AFL career ==
Jaensch commenced his junior career in the Hills Football League with the Hahndorf Football Club, before working his way through the underage ranks at SANFL club Sturt. He impressed Adelaide scouts after a break-out season with Sturt in 2009, in which he played 20 league games and kicked the winning goal in the preliminary final against Glenelg. Jaensch was previously an apprentice electrician and supported Essendon prior to being drafted.

== AFL career ==
Jaensch made his AFL debut in round 6, 2010, against Port Adelaide. He played eleven games for the season, playing mainly as a small forward. He shifted to defence in 2011 to great effect, playing 13 games before missing the last month of the season with a shoulder injury. He continued to impress in the first half of 2012, with his offensive run and long kicking a highlight, before struggling in the latter half with a groin injury that eventually required surgery. Jaensch was in and out of the side in 2013, playing 11 games at half-back and half-forward, where he was trialled to bolster the struggling forward line.

In 2014, Jaensch had a career-best season, playing all 22 games. Playing as a running defender, he led the club in marks and was second in metres gained. In round 7, 2015, in a match against St Kilda, Jaensch suffered an anterior cruciate ligament injury and missed the rest of the season. He was charged with drink driving during his rehabilitation from the injury.

Jaensch announced his retirement from AFL football in February 2016.

== Statistics ==
Legend
G	Goals	K	Kicks	D	Disposals	T	Tackles
B	Behinds	H	Handballs	M	Marks

Season	Team	No.	Games	Totals							Averages (per game)						
Season	Team	No.	Games	G	B	K	H	D	M	T	G	B	K	H	D	M	T
2010	Adelaide	48	11	7	4	82	51	133	43	34	0.6	0.4	7.5	4.6	12.1	3.9	3.1
2011	Adelaide	10	13	4	2	145	95	240	50	30	0.3	0.2	11.2	7.3	18.5	3.9	2.3
2012	Adelaide	10	10	3	2	102	42	144	42	22	0.3	0.2	10.2	4.2	14.4	4.2	2.2
2013	Adelaide	10	11	4	3	96	44	140	47	27	0.4	0.3	8.7	4.0	12.7	4.3	2.5
2014	Adelaide	10	22	7	5	297	166	463	126	54	0.3	0.2	13.5	7.6	21.1	5.7	2.5
2015	Adelaide	10	7	0	2	110	32	142	57	17	0.0	0.3	15.7	4.6	20.3	8.1	2.4
2016	Adelaide	10	0	—	—	—	—	—	—	—	—	—	—	—	—	—	—
Career			74	25	18	832	430	1262	365	184	0.3	0.2	11.2	5.8	17.1	4.9	2.5
