= Jacob Mollison =

Australian rules football umpire

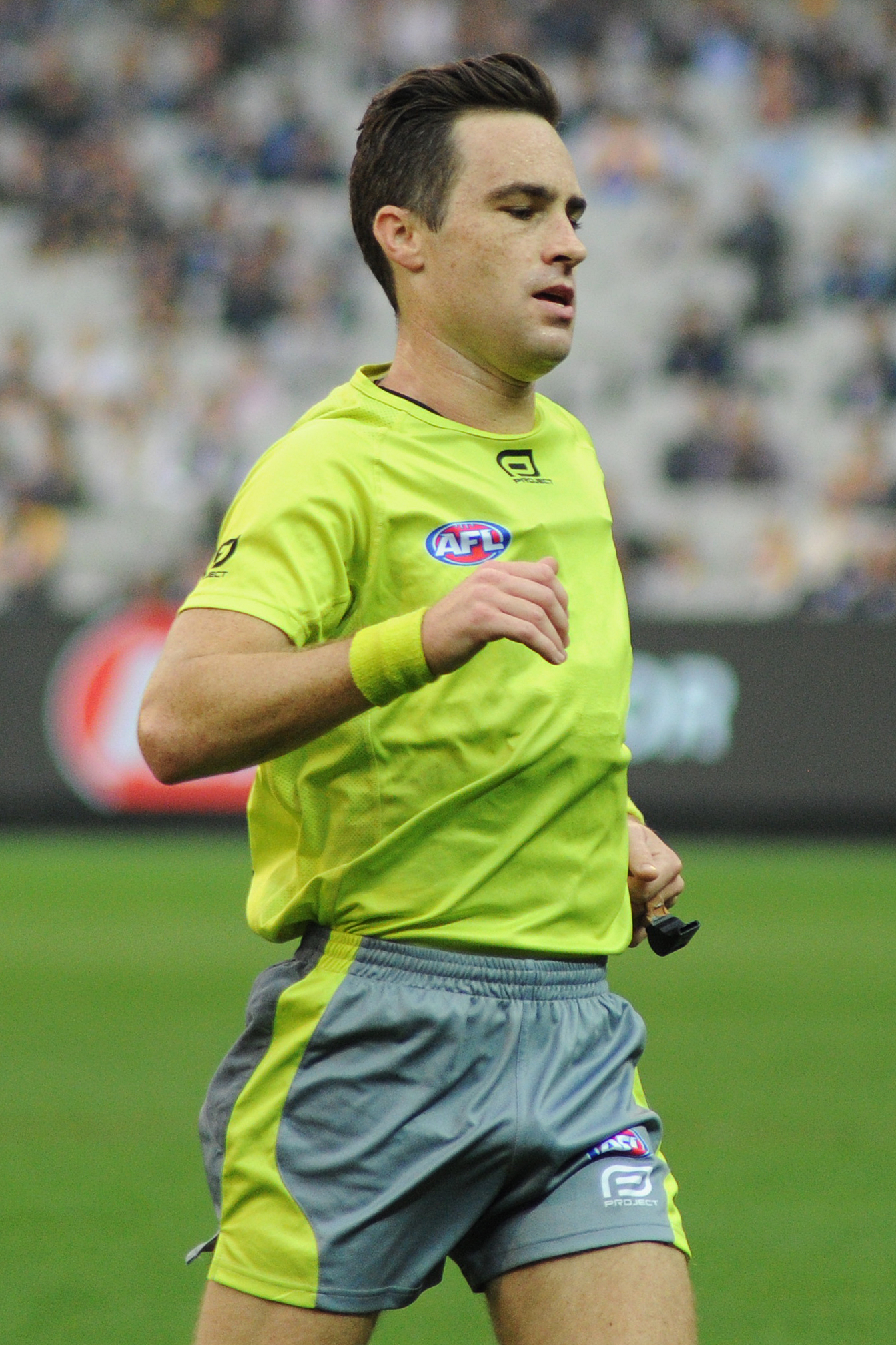
- Mollison in April 2018

Personal information
- Full name: Jacob Mollison

Umpiring career
Years	League	Role	Games
2008–	AFL	Field umpire	407 as of 2026

Jacob Mollison is an Australian rules football umpire currently officiating in the Australian Football League (AFL).

== Career ==
Before umpiring in the AFL, Mollison umpired in the 2002, 2003 and 2004 Ovens & Murray Football League grand finals and the 2006 and 2007 Victorian Football League (VFL) grand finals. He was the VFL umpire of the year in 2007.

Mollison was appointed to the AFL list in 2008 and made his debut in round 6 of that year, in a match between the Western Bulldogs and West Coast.

Mollison has umpired in two AFL Grand Finals: 2021 and 2025.
