= Jay van Berlo =

Australian rules footballer (born 1988)

Personal information
- Full name: Jay van Berlo
- Born: 18 September 1988 (age 38)
- Original team: West Perth (WAFL)
- Draft: No. 62, 2009 Rookie Draft, Fremantle; No. 112 (RP), 2010 National Draft, Fremantle
- Height: 188 cm (6 ft 2 in)
- Weight: 88 kg (194 lb)
- Position: Defender

Playing career^{1}
Years	Club	Games (Goals)
2009–2012	Fremantle	32 (10)
- ^{1} Playing statistics correct to the end of 2012.

Career highlights
- West Perth Captain (2014–2017); West Perth premiership player (2013); West Perth Best & Fairest 2008, 2016

Jay van Berlo (born 18 September 1988) is an Australian rules footballer, who formerly played for the Fremantle Football Club in the Australian Football League (AFL). He currently plays for the West Perth Football Club in the West Australian Football League (WAFL).

Originally from the Whitfords Junior Football Club, he made his WAFL league debut for West Perth in mid-2007. He had shoulder surgery prior to the 2008 season, after which he played in every game and was awarded the 2008 Breckler Medal as West Perth's best and fairest player.

Fremantle then drafted van Berlo in the 2009 Rookie Draft with their fifth selection, number 62 overall.

After missing the first half of the season due to a stress fracture injury, he returned to West Perth for two reserves and two senior matches before he was elevated to Fremantle's senior list as a nominated rookie. He made his AFL debut for Fremantle in the Round 17 Western Derby at Subiaco Oval against West Coast, the eleventh player to make their debut for Fremantle in 2009 and the 39th player used. Although he has mainly played as a defensive midfielder for West Perth, he played as a forward for Fremantle and kicked two goals, including one in the final minutes of the game which gave Fremantle the lead.

He kicked a career-high four goals in Fremantle's 7-point win over the Western Bulldogs in round 5 of the 2011 season.

He is the younger brother of Adelaide midfielder Nathan van Berlo.

At the conclusion of Fremantle's 2012 season, van Berlo was delisted by Fremantle.
