= Stuart Wenn =

Australian rules football field umpire

Stuart Wenn is a former Australian rules football field umpire in the Australian Football League. He made his AFL umpiring debut in 1995, and umpired in 340 senior matches over a career spanning 20 seasons.

Wenn's father, Rex, was a leading Victorian Football Association umpire during the 1970s, who umpired in grand finals in that competition.
