= Ricky Henderson =

Australian footballer (born 1988)

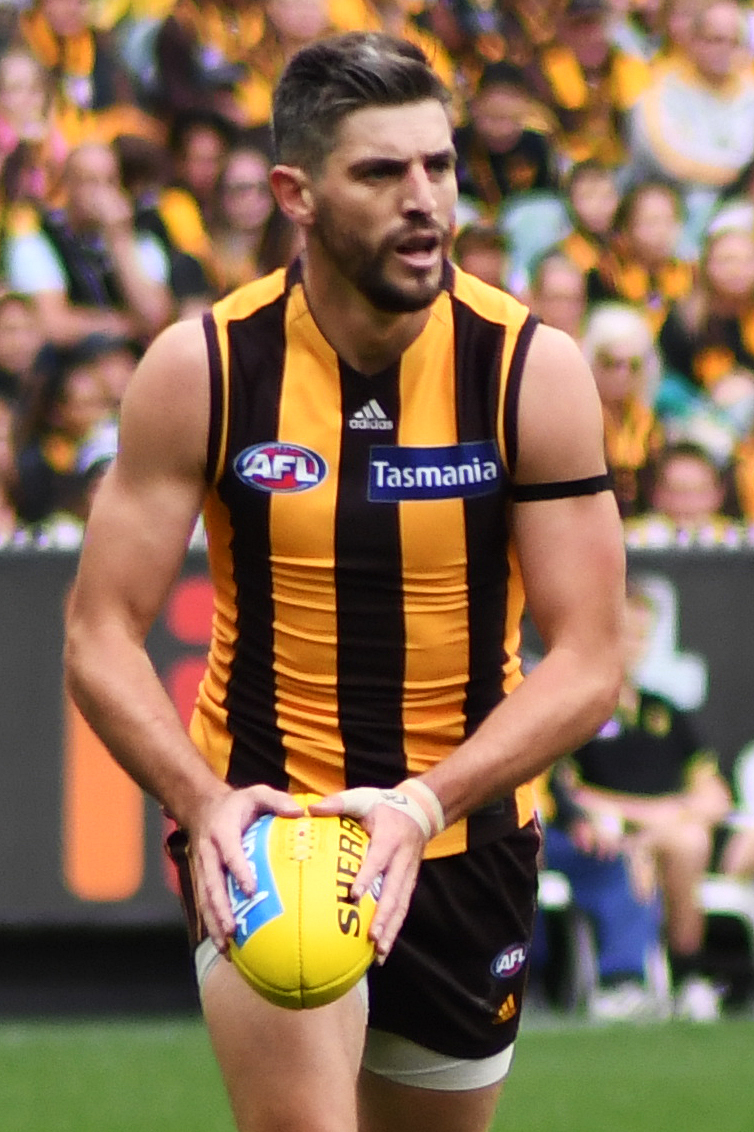
- Henderson playing for Hawthorn in April 2019

Personal information
- Full name: Ricky John Henderson
- Nickname: Hendo
- Born: 11 September 1988 (age 38)
- Original team: Trentham (MCDFL)
- Draft: No. 10, 2009 rookie draft
- Debut: Round 5, 2010, Adelaide vs. Western Bulldogs, at Etihad Stadium
- Height: 188 cm (6 ft 2 in)
- Weight: 89 kg (196 lb)
- Position: Midfielder / defender

Playing career^{1}
Years	Club	Games (Goals)
2009–2016	Adelaide	90 (43)
2017–2020	Hawthorn	69 (36)
Total		159 (79)
- ^{1} Playing statistics correct to the end of 2020.

Career highlights
- Peter Crimmins Medal (2nd HFC B&F): 2019; Pre-season premiership player: 2012

Ricky John Henderson (born 11 September 1988) is a former Australian rules footballer who played for the Adelaide Football Club and the Hawthorn Football Club in the Australian Football League (AFL). Henderson was Adelaide's first selection in the 2009 rookie draft, taken at pick 10.

== Early life ==
At the time of his drafting, Henderson had played only three games of Australian rules football in the previous four years, having played basketball locally in Ballarat. Before being drafted by Adelaide, Henderson supported Geelong.

== AFL career ==
Henderson made his debut for Adelaide in round 5, 2010 against the Western Bulldogs, injuring his hamstring in that game, but was recalled to the side in round 12. He went on to play out the season, kicking 13 goals in 12 games playing as a forward. At the end of the season he was promoted to the senior list. Henderson played 18 games in 2011 despite battling a hip injury late in the season. He played mainly on the wing, impressing with his pace, goalkicking and ability to create turnovers, and gathering 28 disposals against the Western Bulldogs in round 13.

In 2012 Henderson played 12 matches despite missing a period of the season with an ankle injury. He played mainly on the wing and in the backline, but kicked six goals in a win over Port Adelaide in round 15, playing forward in the absence of Taylor Walker, Kurt Tippett and Shaun McKernan. He played 14 games in 2013, establishing himself in the Crows' side, particularly in defence, before a knee injury ended his season.

Henderson broke his leg in a training session in February 2014, ruling him out for most of the 2014 season. He returned in round 16 against Greater Western Sydney and played the last eight matches of the season, averaging 17 disposals. He also signed a two-year contract extension that would have kept him at the club until the end of 2017. Henderson played 17 games in 2015 and averaged a career-best 19 possessions, including being a key contributor to Adelaide's elimination final win with 29 possessions. At the conclusion of the 2016 season, he was delisted by Adelaide. He subsequently joined Hawthorn as a delisted free agent.

== Personal life ==
Henderson is married to Jenny and has two children, daughter Rylee and son Billy.

== Statistics ==
Legend
G	Goals	K	Kicks	D	Disposals	T	Tackles
B	Behinds	H	Handballs	M	Marks

Season	Team	No.	Games	Totals							Averages (per game)							Votes
Season	Team	No.	Games	G	B	K	H	D	M	T	G	B	K	H	D	M	T	Votes
2009	Adelaide	45	0	—	—	—	—	—	—	—	—	—	—	—	—	—	—	0
2010	Adelaide	45	12	13	8	86	73	159	59	31	1.1	0.7	7.2	6.1	13.3	4.9	2.6	1
2011	Adelaide	45	18	12	10	123	82	205	68	46	0.7	0.6	6.8	4.6	11.4	3.8	2.6	0
2012	Adelaide	45	12	9	2	99	53	152	54	11	0.8	0.2	8.3	4.4	12.7	4.5	0.9	2
2013	Adelaide	45	14	5	5	188	82	270	85	26	0.4	0.4	13.4	5.9	19.3	6.1	1.9	3
2014	Adelaide	45	8	0	2	91	44	135	37	7	0.0	0.3	11.4	5.5	16.9	4.6	0.9	0
2015	Adelaide	45	17	3	2	202	131	333	90	23	0.2	0.1	11.9	7.7	19.6	5.3	1.4	0
2016	Adelaide	45	9	1	3	114	85	199	54	12	0.1	0.3	12.7	9.4	22.1	6.0	1.3	0
2017	Hawthorn	31	18	13	9	217	172	389	119	38	0.7	0.5	12.1	9.6	21.6	6.6	2.1	3
2018	Hawthorn	31	22	11	9	281	166	447	138	65	0.5	0.4	12.8	7.5	20.3	6.3	3.0	0
2019	Hawthorn	31	22	12	8	333	208	541	159	46	0.5	0.4	15.1	9.5	24.6	7.2	2.1	10
2020 (Note: The 2020 season was played with 17 home-and-away matches per team (down from 22) and 16-minute quarters with time on (down from 20-minute quarters with time on) due to the impact of the COVID-19 pandemic.)	Hawthorn	31	7	0	0	55	50	105	37	11	0.0	0.0	7.9	7.1	15.0	5.3	1.6	0
Career			159	79	58	1789	1146	2935	900	316	0.5	0.4	11.3	7.2	18.5	5.7	2.0	19

== Honours and achievements ==
Team

- Pre-season premiership player (Adelaide): 2012
