= Chris Knights =

Australian rules footballer, born 1986

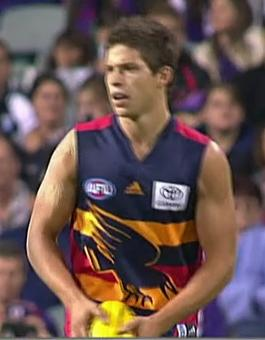

Personal information
- Full name: Chris Knights
- Nickname: Knighta
- Born: 25 September 1986 (age 40); Melbourne, Victoria
- Original team: Mount Waverley Blues (Vic)/Vermont (Vic)/Eastern Ranges
- Draft: 56th overall, 2004; Adelaide
- Height: 186 cm (6 ft 1 in)
- Weight: 84 kg (185 lb)
- Position: Half-forward

Playing career^{1}
Years	Club	Games (Goals)
2005–2012	Adelaide	96 (68)
2013–2015	Richmond	6 (7)
Total		102 (75)
- ^{1} Playing statistics correct to the end of round 3, 2015.

Chris Knights (born 25 September 1986) is a former professional Australian rules footballer who played for the Adelaide Football Club and Richmond Football Club in the Australian Football League (AFL).

== AFL career ==
Chris played his junior football with the Mount Waverley Blues Junior Football Club and also the Vermont Football Club before being selected to play for the Eastern Ranges in the TAC Cup. Knights, a dual Victorian Metropolitan under-18 representative (2003/04), was selected in the 2004 AFL draft by the Adelaide Football Club with the 56th selection.

Knights was eased into the AFL system, playing just two games in the 2005 season and ten in 2006 before cementing his spot in the side in 2007, missing only one game.

Knights saw more action in 2007, developing into a midfielder and regularly featuring in Adelaide's best players on a regular basis. He racked up a career high 37 disposals in a game against Collingwood in round 15, earning the first Brownlow Medal votes of his career.

In round 7 of the 2009 season, Knights made a surprising move to the forward line. This move paid off, with Knights booting three and two goals respectively in losses against the Western Bulldogs and Brisbane Lions, before managing bags of five, four and five in the Crows' impressive victories over Carlton, Hawthorn and Essendon. During this prolific period, Knights became the most accurate goalkicker in the AFL, having booted 21.3 from 24 scoring shots at that point of the 2009 season with an accuracy percentage of 87.5. On 25 September 2012, Knights left Adelaide. On 1 October 2012 Knights signed a contract with the Richmond Football Club during the free agency period.

Knights started off his first season at Richmond well kicking 6 goals in his first 5 games. However, in round 7 against Port Adelaide at AAMI Stadium, Knights hurt his knee which cost him his season.

In August 2015, Knights announced he would retire at the end of the season.

== Personal life ==
Chris is the Chief Executive and Founder of Zib Digital, a digital marketing company which operates in both Australia and New Zealand. Zib Digital was a top ten finalist in the 2014 Australian Startup Awards.

== Playing statistics ==
Legend
G	Goals	K	Kicks	D	Disposals	T	Tackles
B	Behinds	H	Handballs	M	Marks

Season	Team	No.	Games	Totals							Averages (per game)						
Season	Team	No.	Games	G	B	K	H	D	M	T	G	B	K	H	D	M	T
2005	Adelaide	21	2	0	0	6	4	10	3	1	0.0	0.0	3.0	2.0	5.0	1.5	0.5
2006	Adelaide	21	10	1	3	67	65	132	31	20	0.1	0.3	6.7	6.5	13.2	3.1	2.0
2007	Adelaide	21	22	5	12	276	239	515	123	60	0.2	0.5	12.5	10.9	23.4	5.6	2.7
2008	Adelaide	21	16	4	3	201	132	333	79	51	0.3	0.2	12.6	8.3	20.8	4.9	3.2
2009	Adelaide	21	20	43	25	187	165	352	95	63	2.2	1.3	9.4	8.3	17.6	4.8	3.2
2010	Adelaide	21	5	2	2	37	38	75	21	17	0.4	0.4	7.4	7.6	15.0	4.2	3.4
2011	Adelaide	21	16	10	16	158	134	292	83	43	0.6	1.0	9.9	8.4	18.3	5.2	2.7
2012	Adelaide	21	5	3	3	37	23	60	15	8	0.6	0.6	7.4	4.6	12.0	3.0	1.6
2013	Richmond	15	5	6	5	54	32	86	25	8	1.2	1.0	10.8	6.4	17.2	5.0	1.6
2014	Richmond	15	0	—	—	—	—	—	—	—	—	—	—	—	—	—	—
2015	Richmond	15	1	1	0	3	1	4	1	3	1.0	0.0	3.0	1.0	4.0	1.0	3.0
Career			102	75	69	1026	833	1859	476	274	0.7	0.7	10.1	8.2	18.2	4.7	2.7
