= Graham Johncock =

Australian rules footballer, born 1982

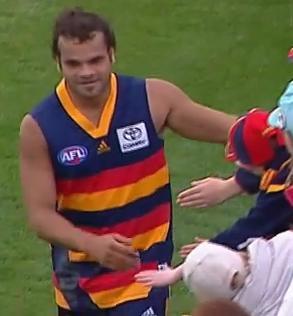
- Johncock with Adelaide in 2006

Personal information
- Full name: Graham Johncock
- Nickname: Stiffy
- Born: 21 October 1982 (age 44); Port Lincoln, Australia
- Original team: Port Adelaide Magpies (SANFL)
- Draft: 67th overall, 2000; Adelaide
- Height: 180 cm (5 ft 11 in)
- Weight: 84 kg (185 lb)
- Positions: Defender, forward

Playing career^{1}
Years	Club	Games (Goals)
2001–2013	Adelaide	227 (120)

Representative team honours
Years	Team	Games (Goals)
2009	Indigenous All-Stars	2 (3)

International team honours
2006	Australia	2 (0)
- ^{1} Playing statistics correct to the end of 2013.

Career highlights
- Adelaide leading goalkicker (2003); Showdown Medal (round 5, 2003)

Graham Johncock (born 21 October 1982) is a former professional Australian rules footballer who played for the Adelaide Football Club in the Australian Football League (AFL).

Johncock is an Indigenous Australian from Port Lincoln in South Australia where he currently resides with his partner and four children. Johncock is currently a reserves player at the Mallee Park Football Club.

== Career highlights ==
In 2003, Johncock scored the most goals for Adelaide with a total of 30 goals. He won the Showdown Medal in round 5, despite his side's loss.

Johncock was leading the club champion award early in the 2005 season before breaking his leg in a game against Melbourne in round 7. He had spent most of these games in defence, but was occasionally pushed forward. He missed a large chunk of the season, but returned before the finals and played a couple of games. He was hampered in the finals, however, by a leg injury.

Johncock retired on 1 July 2013, saying his body could no longer withstand the rigours of AFL.
