= Sam Hay (umpire) =

Australian rules football field umpire

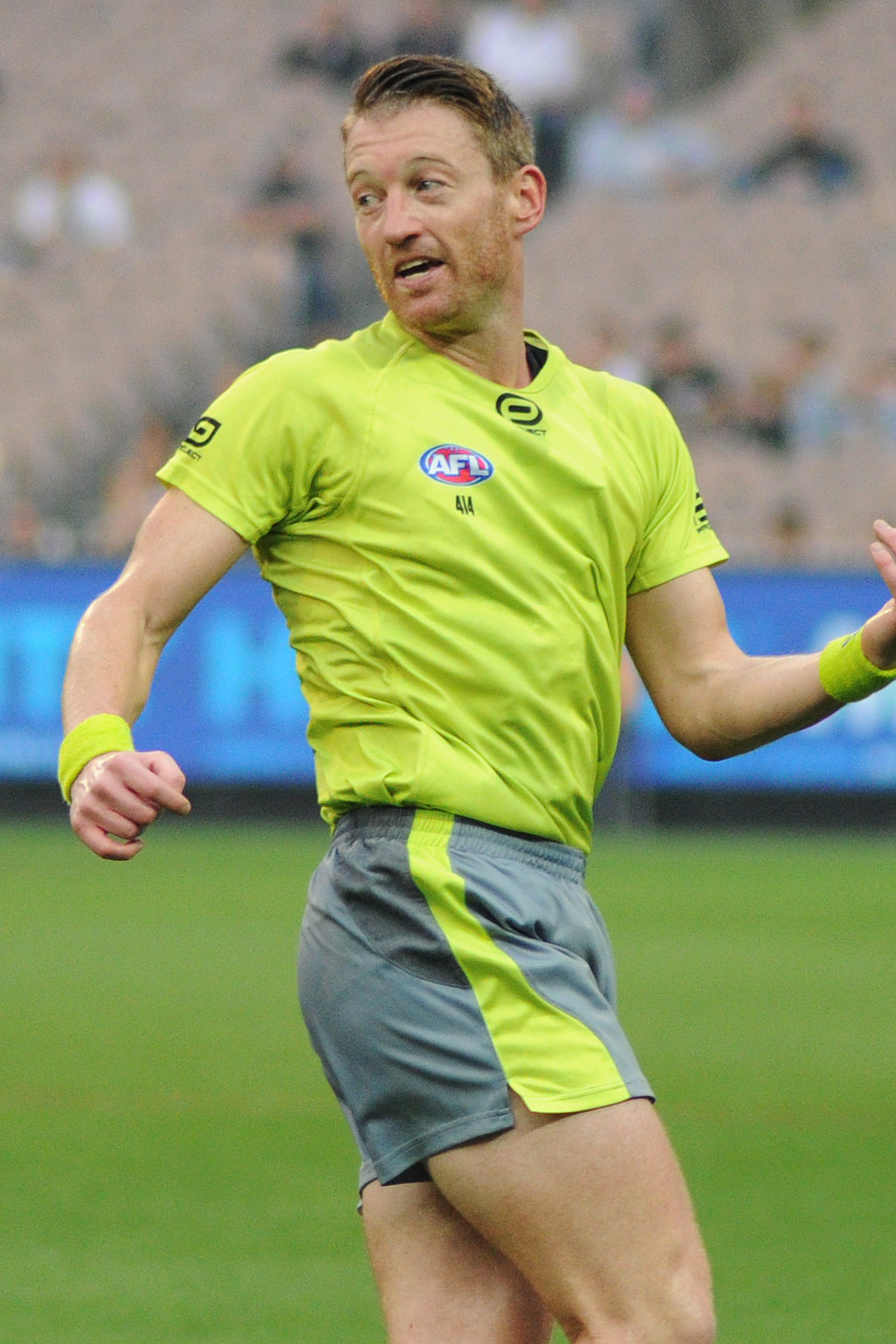
- Hay in April 2018

Personal information
- Born: Adelaide, South Australia

Umpiring career
Years	League	Role	Games
2009–present	AFL	Field Umpire	79
2003–present	SANFL	Field Umpire	121

Career highlights
- SANFL Grand Finals 2005, 2007, 2008; AFL Debut 2009; SANFL Golden Whistle 2008

Sam Hay is an Australian rules football field umpire in the Australian Football League.

Based in South Australia, Hay umpired the 2005, 2007 and 2008 South Australian National Football League (SANFL) Grand Finals. He made the AFL Senior Panel in 2009, umpiring his first AFL game in that year.

Hay also won the 2008 SANFL Golden Whistle, recognizing him as the best umpire in the state for that year.
