= AFL Dream Team =

Online fantasy Australian rules football game

- Screenshot of an AFL Dream Team
- Website type: Sports
- Website: AFL Dream Team
- Current status: Public

AFL Dream Team is an online Australian rules football based fantasy football game that was created in 2001 by Vapormedia and published by the Australian Football League (AFL) and Toyota. Participants assemble an imaginary team of real life players, limited by a salary cap, and score points based on those players' actual statistical performance on the field of play throughout the AFL home-and-away season. It is the second most popular Australian rules football fantasy game behind News Corporation's Supercoach game. It is similar to an offline based game of the same name that was run in the 1990s by The Age newspaper in Melbourne.

== Point scoring ==
Points are gained or deducted depending on the performances of 22 selected players for each round. Up to four emergencies can replace players in the team's starting 22, who did not play that specific round. If there is a 0-scoring player in a certain position and emergency is selected in that position, no points will be scored for that player. Meanwhile, the remaining five substitutes on the reserves list do not score, but can increase in value. Each week up to two trades can be made but if there are bye rounds that happen in generally round 10-14, the person playing is given 3 trades a week.

Points are awarded for the following achievements.

- Kick = 3 Points
- Handball = 2 Points
- Mark = 3 Points
- Tackle = 4 Points
- Free Kick For = 1 Point
- Free Kick Against = -3 Points
- Hitout = 1 Point
- Goal = 6 Points
- Behind = 1 Point
