= Ben McGlynn =

Australian rules footballer (born 1985)

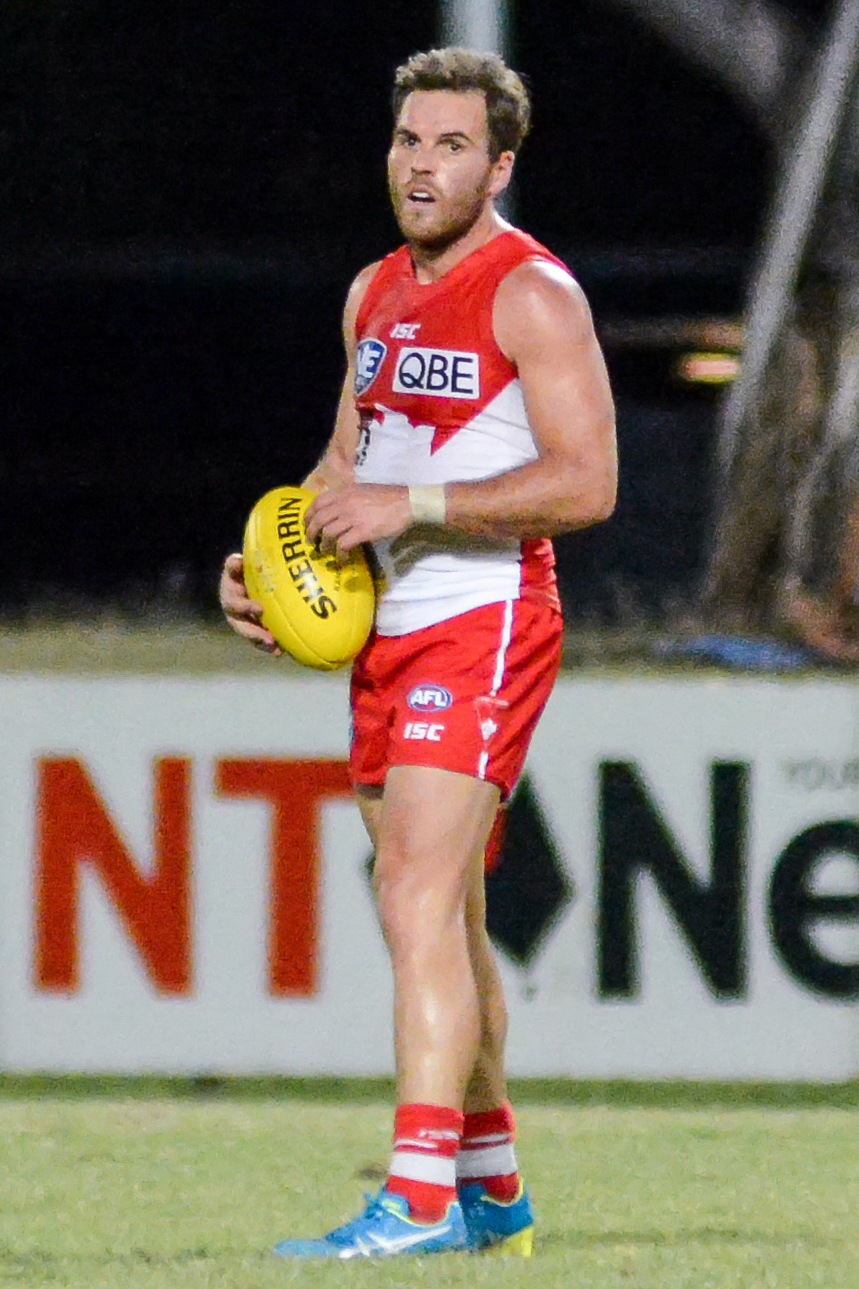
- McGlynn in 2016

Personal information
- Full name: Ben McGlynn
- Born: 6 August 1985 (age 41)
- Original team: Bendigo Pioneers (TAC Cup)
- Draft: No. 55, 2006 rookie draft
- Debut: Round 10, 2006, Hawthorn vs. Western Bulldogs, at Telstra Dome
- Height: 174 cm (5 ft 9 in)
- Weight: 75 kg (165 lb)
- Position: Forward

Playing career^{1}
Years	Club	Games (Goals)
2006–2009	Hawthorn	44 (28)
2010–2016	Sydney	127 (167)
Total		171 (195)

International team honours^{2}
Years	Team	Games (Goals)
2011	Australia	0
- ^{1} Playing statistics correct to the end of 2016.^{2} Representative statistics correct as of 2010.

Ben McGlynn (born 6 August 1985) is an Australian rules football coach and former player who played with the Hawthorn Football Club and Sydney Swans in the Australian Football League. He is currently an coach at Red cliffs secondary college for sports academy.

== AFL career ==
McGlynn was raised in Dareton, New South Wales but spent his junior football at nearby Wentworth with the Wentworth Football Club in the Sunraysia Football and Netball League, debuting as a senior at the age of 15. In 2002, he moved to Bendigo to play in the Under-18 TAC Cup competition and nominate for the AFL Draft. However was overlooked in multiple AFL drafts due primarily to his height. Refusing to give up on his AFL dream he moved to Melbourne in 2004.

=== Recruitment ===
A small onballer, McGlynn was picked late by Hawthorn in the 2006 rookie draft after impressing at the Box Hill Hawks the VFL affiliated club with the Hawks. Originally from Dareton, New South Wales, he played for the Bendigo Pioneers in the TAC Cup.

McGlynn excelled for Box Hill at VFL level and is a centre clearance specialist who will only improve as he builds his fitness to AFL standards.

=== Hawthorn (2006–2009) ===
During the 2006 season McGlynn made his debut against the Bulldogs in round 10, in which he kicked a goal. He continued to play three more at senior level and did OK as a small forward. He was promoted to the seniors list at the end of the 2006 season. In 14 games for Box Hill during the 2006 season he featured in the best players eight times.

In 2007 McGlynn played 21 games for Hawthorn after injured skipper Richie Vandenberg left an opening in the midfield.

=== Sydney (2010–2016) ===
McGlynn and Josh Kennedy were traded to the Sydney Swans at the end of the 2009 season. His transfer has appeared to have immediate dividends with McGlynn booting a career-best 5 goal haul against the Adelaide Crows in his second game for the Swans. McGlynn unfortunately missed many games due to various injuries, including a quad injury and a cheek fracture sustained in a brutal collision with Zac Clarke of Fremantle at Subiaco Oval. When he played however he was one of the most consistent players for the side, playing through the forward line and providing quality defensive pressure and goal kicking ability.

McGlynn's 2011 season was book-ended by very consistent play in different roles. He started in the same role he played for much of 2010, a small forward. Here he kicked goals often and was the leading Swans' goal kicker at the halfway point of the year. So dangerous was he becoming that opposition sides started to tag him more heavily and as such, McGlynn's output through the middle of the year dropped. Coach John Longmire consequently moved him into the midfield to play as a tagger (a role which he played during his time in Hawthorn) and McGlynn's performances improved markedly. His performance in the Swans' massive upset win over Geelong at Skilled Stadium was particularly noteworthy as he not only limited the influence of star Cat midfielder Joel Selwood but also led the clearance count and had over 20 possessions in a near BOG performance. McGlynn's year was rewarded with a 9th-place finish in the 2011 Bob Skilton Medal.

McGlynn missed out on playing in the Swans' 2012 AFL Grand Final victory due to a hamstring injury sustained in week one of the finals. He had been very consistent for Sydney across half forward and in the midfield to that point in the year.

At the conclusion of the 2016 season after playing in the losing grand final, he announced his retirement from the AFL.

== Statistics ==
Legend
G	Goals	K	Kicks	D	Disposals	T	Tackles
B	Behinds	H	Handballs	M	Marks

Season	Team	No.	Games	Totals							Averages (per game)							Votes
Season	Team	No.	Games	G	B	K	H	D	M	T	G	B	K	H	D	M	T	Votes
2006	Hawthorn	43	4	2	1	48	24	72	26	11	0.5	0.3	12.0	6.0	18.0	6.5	2.8	0
2007	Hawthorn	22	21	15	11	230	121	351	142	50	0.7	0.5	11.0	5.8	16.7	6.8	2.4	3
2008	Hawthorn	21	3	2	1	32	18	50	22	8	0.7	0.3	10.7	6.0	16.7	7.3	2.7	0
2009	Hawthorn	21	16	9	16	170	128	298	92	61	0.6	1.0	10.6	8.0	18.6	5.8	3.8	1
2010	Sydney	21	14	23	13	147	99	246	78	45	1.6	0.9	10.5	7.1	17.6	5.6	3.2	8
2011	Sydney	21	24	30	24	235	135	370	85	114	1.3	1.0	9.8	5.6	15.4	3.5	4.8	6
2012	Sydney	21	22	30	24	206	119	325	80	73	1.4	1.1	9.4	5.4	14.8	3.6	3.3	2
2013	Sydney	21	21	30	16	191	88	279	62	87	1.4	0.8	9.1	4.2	13.3	3.0	4.1	0
2014	Sydney	21	19	24	16	233	151	384	83	121	1.3	0.8	12.3	7.9	20.2	4.4	6.4	12
2015	Sydney	21	9	6	6	83	52	135	45	42	0.7	0.7	9.2	5.8	15.0	5.0	4.7	0
2016	Sydney	21	18	24	11	157	88	245	66	79	1.3	0.6	8.7	4.9	13.6	3.7	4.4	1
Career			171	195	139	1732	1023	2755	781	691	1.1	0.8	10.1	6.0	16.1	4.6	4.0	33

== Honours and achievements ==
Team

- 2× Minor premiership (Sydney): 2014, 2016

Individual

- Australia international rules football team: 2011
- Box Hill Hawks All-Stars team (1999–2019)

== Post-playing career ==
Following his retirement, Ben joined St Kilda as an assistant coach in October 2016.
