= Nathan van Berlo =

Australian rules footballer, born 1986

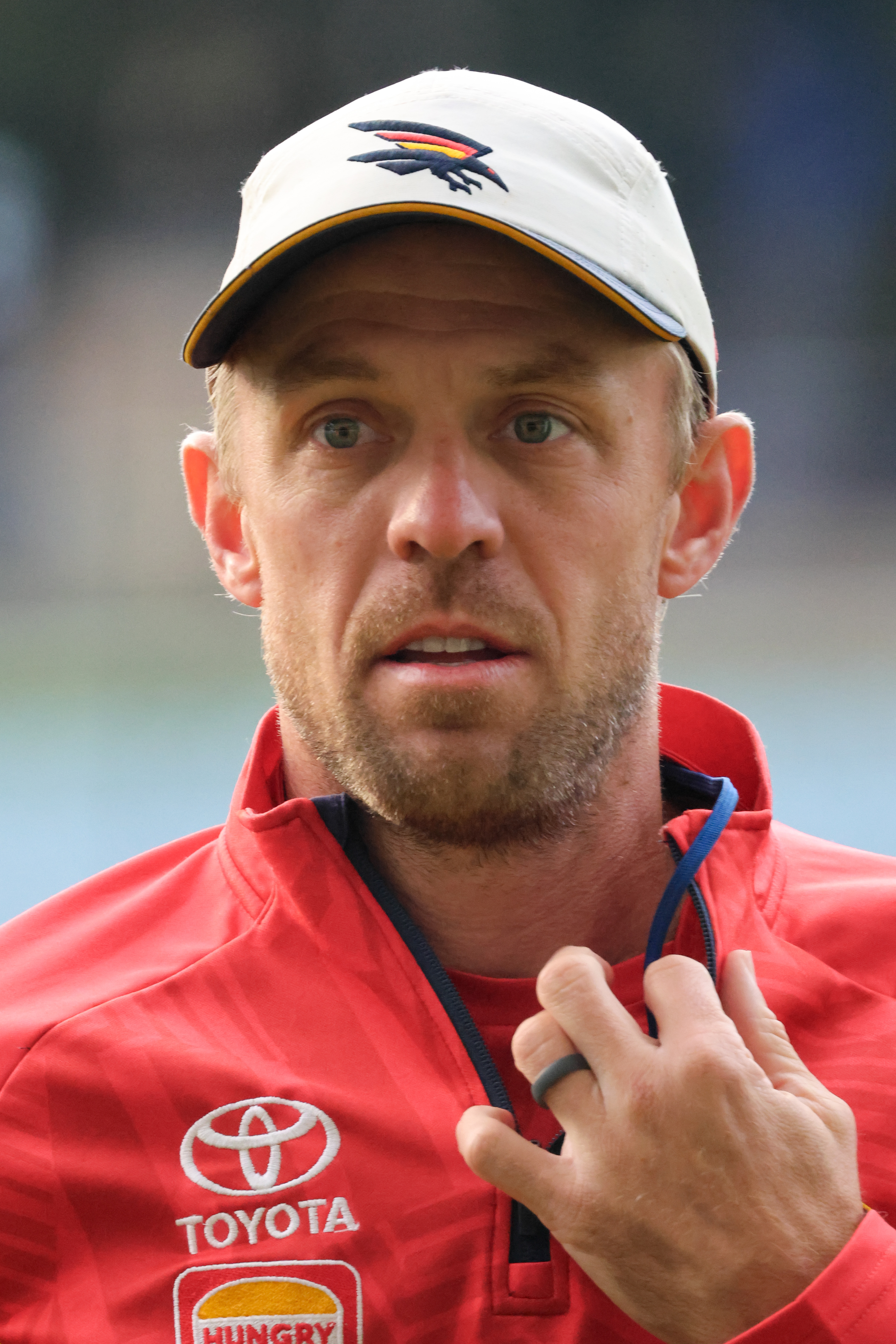
- Van Berlo as Adelaide assistant coach in 2026

Personal information
- Full name: Nathan van Berlo
- Nickname: VB
- Born: 6 June 1986 (age 40); Perth, Western Australia
- Original team: West Perth (WAFL)
- Draft: No. 24, 2004 National Draft, Adelaide
- Debut: Round 3, 2005, Adelaide vs. Port Adelaide, at AAMI Stadium
- Height: 184 cm (6 ft 0 in)
- Weight: 83 kg (13 st 1 lb; 183 lb)
- Position: Midfielder, tagger, small defender

Playing career^{1}
Years	Club	Games (Goals)
2005–2016	Adelaide	205 (68)
- ^{1} Playing statistics correct to the end of 2016.

Career highlights
- Adelaide captain (2011–2014); Showdown Medal (round 19, 2011)

Nathan van Berlo (born 6 June 1986) is a former Australian rules football player who played for the Adelaide Football Club in the Australian Football League (AFL). He was drafted by the club with pick 24 in the 2004 National Draft. He was the captain of the Adelaide Football Club from 2011 until 2014. His younger brother, Jay van Berlo, played 32 matches in four years for Fremantle. Van Berlo has a Dutch heritage, and his parents were born in New Zealand.

== AFL career ==
Van Berlo made his debut in 2005 aged just 18, playing 11 games in the season and averaging just over seven disposals a game. He became a regular the following season, missing five matches due to a broken collarbone but returning to play out the season. In 2007, van Berlo cemented a place in the starting 22, averaging 19 disposals per game and coming equal seventh in the club Best and Fairest. By this stage, van Berlo was a regular performer in Adelaide's young midfield noted for his high fitness level.

After the retirement of Simon Goodwin, at the end of the 2010 season, van Berlo was selected to become the captain of the club in the 2011 season. He performed solidly in his first year as captain, finishing second in the Malcolm Blight Medal playing in defence and in the midfield.

In 2012, van Berlo spent most of the season as a tagger, laying more tackles than anyone else at the club while also still ranking fifth at Adelaide for total disposals. He reprised this role in 2013, shutting down some of the competition's most dangerous players such as Brent Harvey and Stephen Hill. He also re-signed with Adelaide until the end of 2016 during the year.

Van Berlo ruptured his right Achilles tendon in a freak training accident prior to the 2014 season. This meant he missed the entire season, although he came close to making a miraculous return in the last few weeks of the season. In January 2015, van Berlo was replaced as captain by Taylor Walker.

After indifferent form following his return in 2015, van Berlo was dropped for the round 16 clash with Port Adelaide. He later regained his place in the side and played his 200th match in round 23 against Geelong.

In September 2016, he announced his immediate retirement from the AFL.

== Statistics ==
Legend
G	Goals	K	Kicks	D	Disposals	T	Tackles
B	Behinds	H	Handballs	M	Marks

Season	Team	No.	Games	Totals							Averages (per game)						
Season	Team	No.	Games	G	B	K	H	D	M	T	G	B	K	H	D	M	T
2005	Adelaide	7	11	1	2	44	28	72	20	11	0.1	0.2	4.0	2.6	6.6	1.8	1.0
2006	Adelaide	7	19	5	5	143	110	253	58	44	0.3	0.3	7.5	5.8	13.3	3.1	2.3
2007	Adelaide	7	23	7	12	219	215	434	98	75	0.3	0.5	9.5	9.4	18.9	4.3	3.3
2008	Adelaide	7	23	8	12	234	251	485	110	83	0.4	0.5	10.2	10.9	21.1	4.8	3.6
2009	Adelaide	7	21	5	5	164	292	456	104	61	0.2	0.2	7.8	13.9	21.7	5.0	2.9
2010	Adelaide	7	19	5	4	182	205	387	110	62	0.3	0.2	9.6	10.8	20.4	5.8	3.3
2011	Adelaide	7	22	12	12	282	236	518	126	76	0.6	0.6	12.8	10.7	23.6	5.7	3.5
2012	Adelaide	7	25	13	11	293	162	455	105	126	0.5	0.4	11.7	6.5	18.2	4.2	5.0
2013	Adelaide	7	19	8	9	209	114	323	69	62	0.4	0.5	11.0	6.0	17.0	3.6	3.3
2015	Adelaide	7	20	4	6	187	119	306	79	74	0.2	0.3	9.4	6.0	15.3	4.0	3.7
2016	Adelaide	7	3	0	1	23	13	36	9	8	0.0	0.3	7.7	4.3	12.0	3.0	2.7
Career			205	68	79	1980	1745	3725	888	682	0.3	0.4	9.7	8.5	18.2	4.3	3.3

== Coaching career ==
Following his retirement from senior football, Van Berlo returned to the Adelaide Football Club in 2017 to become a development coach. In 2018, he returned to his home state to join the coaching panel of the West Coast Eagles. As the midfield coach, he helped the Eagles towards winning the 2018 premiership.

After a successful three-year stint with the Eagles, Van Berlo returned to the Crows to become their midfield coach from 2021 onwards.

In December 2025, Van Berlo was announced to be an assistant coach for Western Australia in the AFL's 2026 Origin match against Victoria, joining senior AFL coaches Dean Cox and Justin Longmuir.
