= 2009 Adelaide Football Club season =

19th season in the Australian Football League (AFL)

Adelaide Football Club
2009 season
- President: Rob Chapman
- Coach: Neil Craig
- Captain: Simon Goodwin
- Home ground: AAMI Stadium
- Pre-season competition: First round
- AFL season: 5th
- Finals series: Semi finals
- Best and Fairest: Bernie Vince
- Leading goalkicker: Jason Porplyzia (57)
- Highest home attendance: 46,859 vs. Port Adelaide (26 July 2009)
- Lowest home attendance: 30,173 vs. North Melbourne (14 June 2009)
- Average home attendance: 38,801

The 2009 AFL season was the Adelaide Football Club's 19th season in the Australian Football League (AFL).

The captain for this season was Simon Goodwin, and the leadership group was Tyson Edwards, Brett Burton, Ben Rutten, Nathan van Berlo, Michael Doughty and Scott Stevens.

== Playing list ==
Statistics are correct as of start of 2009 season. Flags represent place of birth.

Senior List
No.	Born	Player	Hgt (cm)	Wgt (kg)	Date of birth	Age	Debut	Recruited from	Games	Goals
1	(South Australia)	Nick Gill	192	90	25 August 1982	26	2007	North Adelaide Roosters	16	20
2	(England)	Brad Moran	200	98	29 September 1986	22	2006	Southport/North Melbourne	10	6
3	(Victoria (state))	Brent Reilly	184	85	12 November 1983	25	2003	Calder U18	93	39
4	(Queensland)	Kurt Tippett	201	100	8 May 1987	21	2008	Southport	19	17
5	(South Australia)	Scott Thompson	185	85	14 March 1983	26	2001	Port Adelaide Magpies/Melbourne	132	198
6	(Western Australia)	Jonathon Griffin	201	97	14 January 1986	23	2007	East Fremantle	28	5
7	(Western Australia)	Nathan van Berlo	185	83	6 June 1986	22	2005	West Perth	76	21
8	(Victoria (state))	Myke Cook	184	76	9 October 1989	19	****	Sandringham U18	0	0
9	(South Australia)	Tyson Edwards	178	81	6 August 1976	32	1995	West Adelaide	289	182
10	(Western Australia)	Jarrhan Jacky	179	76	5 April 1989	19	2008	Subiaco	3	1
11	(South Australia)	Michael Doughty	178	80	5 August 1979	29	2000	South Adelaide	142	36
12	(South Australia)	Robert Shirley	185	85	9 June 1980	28	2000	Woodville-West Torrens	140	27
13	(New South Wales)	Taylor Walker	192	87	25 April 1990	18	****	NSW/ACT Rams	0	0
14	(Victoria (state))	David Mackay	182	72	25 July 1988	20	2008	Oakleigh U18	19	4
15	(South Australia)	Brad Symes	187	82	7 March 1985	24	2004	Central District/Port Adelaide	36	4
16	(Australian Capital Territory)	Phil Davis	195	85	30 August 1990	18	****	North Adelaide	0	0
17	(South Australia)	Bernie Vince	188	86	2 October 1985	24	2006	Woodville-West Torrens	31	17
18	(South Australia)	Graham Johncock	180	84	21 October 1982	26	2001	Port Adelaide Magpies	147	89
20	(Victoria (state))	Ivan Maric	198	102	4 January 1986	23	2006	Calder U18	30	16
21	(Victoria (state))	Chris Knights	185	84	25 September 1986	22	2005	Vermont/Eastern Ranges U18	50	10
22	(Victoria (state))	Andy Otten	192	87	15 May 1989	19	2008	Oakleigh U18	2	0
23	(Northern Territory)	Andrew McLeod	181	82	4 August 1976	32	1995	Port Adelaide Magpies	304	256
24	(South Australia)	Brett Burton	185	83	4 May 1978	30	1999	Woodville-West Torrens	164	242
25	(South Australia)	Ben Rutten	191	102	28 May 1983	25	2005	West Adelaide	102	5
26	(Victoria (state))	Richard Douglas	192	86	6 February 1987	22	2006	Calder U18	38	27
27	(Western Australia)	Scott Stevens	195	87	15 January 1982	27	2002	Perth/Sydney	102	69
28	(Victoria (state))	Aaron Kite	190	86	13 January 1990	18	****	Calder Cannons	0	0
29	(South Australia)	James Sellar	196	95	24 March 1989	20	2008	Glenelg	1	0
30	(Western Australia)	Tom Lee	191	86	2 January 1991	17	****	Claremont	0	0
31	(Victoria (state))	Rory Sloane	182	78	17 March 1990	19	****	Eastern Ranges U18	0	0
32	(Victoria (state))	Patrick Dangerfield	188	84	5 April 1990	18	2008	Geelong Falcons U18	2	1
33	(South Australia)	Jared Petrenko	176	74	22 December 1989	19	****	Woodville-West Torrens	0	0
34	(South Australia)	Greg Gallman	188	87	6 December 1988	20	****	North Adelaide Football Club	0	0
35	(Victoria (state))	Shaun McKernan	196	94	1 September 1990	19	****	Calder U18	0	0
36	(South Australia)	Simon Goodwin	184	86	26 December 1976	32	1997	South Adelaide	238	156
37	(South Australia)	Trent Hentschel	193	89	25 December 1982	26	2003	Woodville-West Torrens	61	83
38	(New South Wales)	Tony Armstrong	183	72	29 September 1989	19	****	NSW/ACT Rams/Calder U18	0	0
39	(Victoria (state))	Will Young	192	83	3 August 1990	18	****	North Ballarat U18	0	0
40	(South Australia)	Jason Porplyzia	178	82	27 November 1984	24	2006	West Adelaide	44	57
44	(South Australia)	Nathan Bock	194	92	20 March 1983	27	2004	Woodville-West Torrens	86	53
48	(South Australia)	Matthew Jaensch	182	80	18 September 1989	19	****	Sturt	0	0
Rookie List
No.	Born	Player	Hgt	Wgt	Date of birth	Age	Debut	Recruited from	Games	Goals
41	(South Australia)	Brodie Martin	180	72	6 November 1988	20	****	Sturt	0	0
42	(Republic of Ireland)	Brian Donnelly	191	84	21 June 1988	20	****	(Republic of Ireland) Louth GAA	0	0
43	(New South Wales)	James Moss	186	80	19 November 1989	20	****	Central District	0	0
45	(Victoria (state))	Ricky Henderson	190	78	11 September 1988	21	****	Trentham	0	0
46	(South Australia)	Chris Schmidt	189	82	20 March 1989	21	2007	West Adelaide/Brisbane Lions	2	0

== Player changes for 2009 ==
=== In ===
Player	Previous club	League	via
(Australian Capital Territory) Phil Davis	North Adelaide	SANFL	2008 AFL draft - Pick #10
(Victoria (state)) Shaun McKernan	Calder Cannons	TAC Cup	2008 AFL draft - Pick #28
(Victoria (state)) Rory Sloane	Eastern Ranges	TAC Cup	2008 AFL draft - Pick #44
(Western Australia) Tom Lee	Claremont	WAFL	2008 AFL draft - Pick #60
(Victoria (state)) Will Young	North Ballarat Rebels	TAC Cup	2008 AFL draft - Pick #72
(Victoria (state)) Ricky Henderson	Trentham	TAC Cup	2009 rookie draft - Pick #10
(Queensland) Chris Schmidt	Brisbane Lions	AFL	2009 rookie draft - Pick #26
(Republic of Ireland) Brian Donnelly	Louth GAA	-	2009 rookie draft - Pick #55

=== Out ===
Player	via
(South Australia) Nathan Bassett	Retired
(South Australia) Rhett Biglands	Retired
(South Australia) Ken McGregor	Retired
(South Australia) Bryce Campbell	Delisted
(Western Australia) Luke Jericho	Delisted
(Victoria (state)) Kris Massie	Delisted
(Victoria (state)) Edward Curnow	Delisted

== NAB Cup ==
The despite an opening round loss to Geelong, the 2009 NAB Cup was not a total loss; Trent Hentschel made his return after over two years off with a knee injury. The Crows lost to the Cats by 35 points, 1.17.8 (119) - 2.9.12 (84).

== Home and away season ==
(In the table below, green rows are wins, red rows are losses. In the Score column Adelaide scores are always shown first.)

2009 Season Results
Round	Date	Opponent	Venue (H/A)	Score	Ladder Position	Percentage	W/L
1	28 March	Collingwood	Melbourne Cricket Ground (A)	13.12 (90) – 13.8 (86)	8	104.65	1–0
2	3 April	St Kilda	AAMI Stadium (H)	10.9 (69) – 15.11 (101)	12	85.03	1–1
3	12 April	Fremantle	Subiaco Oval (A)	15.14 (104) – 11.14 (80)	8	98.50	2–1
4	18 April	Geelong	AAMI Stadium (H)	13.8 (86) – 21.8 (134)	12	87.00	2–2
5	26 April	Melbourne	Melbourne Cricket Ground (A)	7.9 (51) – 4.10 (34)	7	91.95	3–2
6	2 May	Port Adelaide	AAMI Stadium (A)	12.7 (79) – 15.15 (105)	11	88.70	3–3
7	10 May	Western Bulldogs	AAMI Stadium (H)	12.14 (86) – 17.16 (118)	12	85.87	3–4
8	16 May	Brisbane Lions	The Gabba (A)	12.11 (83) – 18.11 (119)	12	83.40	3–5
9	23 May	Carlton	AAMI Stadium (H)	15.14 (104) – 8.12 (60)	11	89.84	4–5
10	31 May	Hawthorn	AAMI Stadium (H)	16.10 (106) – 12.7 (79)	11	93.67	5–5
11	7 June	Essendon	Etihad Stadium (A)	21.4 (130) – 19.6 (114)	9	95.92	6–5
12	14 June	Kangaroos	AAMI Stadium (H)	9.14 (68) – 3.6 (24)	6	100.19	7–5
13	27 June	Sydney	AAMI Stadium (H)	12.13 (85) – 10.9 (69)	6	101.60	8–5
14	4 July	Richmond	Gold Coast Stadium (A)	15.12 (102) – 13.7 (85)	5	102.90	9–5
15	11 July	Fremantle	AAMI Stadium (H)	19.16 (130) – 1.7 (13)	5	112.45	10–5
16	19 July	St Kilda	Etihad Stadium (A)	7.6 (48) – 15.15 (105)	6	107.16	10–6
17	26 July	Port Adelaide	AAMI Stadium (H)	19.18 (132) – 9.8 (62)	5	111.89	11–6
18	1 August	Geelong	Skilled Stadium (A)	13.13 (91) – 14.9 (93)	5	111.01	11–7
19	8 August	Collingwood	AAMI Stadium (H)	9.14 (68) – 13.11 (89)	7	109.04	11–8
20	16 August	Hawthorn	Melbourne Cricket Ground (A)	13.16 (94) – 9.13 (67)	6	110.32	12–8
21	22 August	West Coast	AAMI Stadium (H)	18.14 (122) – 7.6 (48)	6	114.42	13–8
22	29 August	Carlton	Etihad Stadium (A)	27.14 (176) – 16.8 (104)	5	117.61	14–8
EF1	4 September	Essendon	AAMI Stadium (H)	26.10 (166) – 10.10 (70)	Not applicable		
SF1	12 September	Collingwood	Melbourne Cricket Ground (A)	11.12 (78) – 12.11 (83)	Not applicable		

All times are adjusted to Australian Central Standard Time.

=== Round 1 ===
Round 1
28 March 2009, 1:40 pm	Collingwood	def. by	Adelaide	Melbourne Cricket Ground (crowd: 41,591)	Report
2.0 (12); 7.1 (43); 12.3 (75); 13.8 (86)	Q1; Q2; Q3; Final	5.5 (35); 8.8 (56); 11.9 (75); 13.12 (90)	Umpires: Justin Schmitt, Simon Meredith, Mathew Nicholls; Most DT Pts: Bernie Vince (Adelaide), 131 pts
Medhurst, Maxwll, Cloke, Anthony, Clarke 2 Davis, Swan, Pendlebury 1	Goals	Stevens 3 Van Berlo, Porplyzia 2 Bock, Knights, Douglas, Dangerfield, Walker, Petrenko 1
Swan, Pendlebury, O'Bree	Best	Edwards, McLeod, Vince
Shaw (hamstring), Rusling (shoulder), Dyas (hamstring)	Injuries	Thompson (hamstring), Gallman (collarbone), Sloane (knee), Burton (knee)
Nil	Reports	Nil

=== Round 2 ===
Round 2
3 April 2009, 7:40 pm	Adelaide	def. by	St Kilda	AAMI Stadium (crowd: 41,189)	Report
2.2 (14); 5.3 (33); 9.8 (62); 10.9 (69)	Q1; Q2; Q3; Final	4.2 (26); 6.7 (43); 10.7 (67); 15.11 (101)	Umpires: Stuart Wenn, Shaun Ryan, Stephen McBurney; Most DT Pts: Leigh Montagna (St Kilda), 127 pts Television broadcast: 7, ABC Radio
Porplyzia, Tippett 3 Hentschel, Maric, Vince, Walker 1	Goals	Koschitzke 4 Riewoldt, Schneider 2 Milne, Gardiner, King, Goddard, Montagna, Ray, Geary 1
Porplyzia, Bock, Edwards	Best	Dal Santo, Koschitzke, Montagna
Goodwin (corked knee), Johncock (thumb), Martin (knee), Moran (knee), Otten (knee), Sellar (hamstring), Shaw (shin), Sloane (ankle), Stevens (concussion), Symes (knee)	Injuries	Clarke (hamstring), Eddy (ankle), Fisher (ankle), Miles (leg stress fracture), Smith (ankle), Steven (foot)

=== Round 3 (Easter) ===
Round 3
12 April 2009, 4:10 pm	Fremantle	def. by	Adelaide	Subiaco Oval (crowd: 30,035)	Report
3.5 (23); 3.7 (25); 7.2 (44); 11.14 (80)	Q1; Q2; Q3; Final	1.3 (9); 6.7 (43); 9.12 (72); 15.14 (104)	Umpires: Todd Keating, Stuart Wenn, Dean Margetts; Most DT Pts: Gary Ablett Jr (Geelong), 155 pts
Pavlich 3 Crowley 2 Hasleby, Schammer, Tarrant, Mundy, Hinkley, Hill 1	Goals	Porplyzia 4 Walker 3 Edwards, McLeod, Symes, Van Berlo, Douglas, Tippett, Gill, Dangerfield 1
Hasleby, Ibbotson, Schammer	Best	Douglas, Dangerfield, Porplyzia, Vince
Hill (finger), Broughton (ankle)	Injuries	Stevens (concussion)
Nil	Reports	Nil

=== Round 4 ===
Round 4
18 April 2009, 7:10 pm	Adelaide	def. by	Geelong	AAMI Stadium (crowd: 40,418)	Report
3.2 (20); 7.2 (44); 11.6 (72); 13.8 (86)	Q1; Q2; Q3; Final	5.1 (31); 10.2 (62); 14.5 (89); 21.8 (134)	Umpires: Justin Schmitt, Simon Meredith, Heath Ryan; Most DT Pts: Gary Ablett, Jr. (Geelong), 155 pts
Porplyzia 3 Mackay, Dangerfield, Walker 2 Edwards, Thompson, Tippett, Petrenko 1	Goals	Ablett, Johnson, Varcoe 3 Mooney, Rooke, Stokes 2 Chapman, Blake, Mackie, Byrnes, Selwood, Mumford 1
Bock, Mackay, Edwards	Best	Ablett, Bartel, Corey
Porplyzia (cut eye)	Injuries	Selwood (cut cheek), Bartel (cut eye), Milburn (back)
Nil	Reports	Nil
Geelong midfielder Gary Ablett, Jr. recorded 46 disposals with 33 handpasses, equalling Collingwood's Nathan Buckley's ten-year-old record for the most disposals in a game since the length of the quarters was shortened to twenty minutes in 1994.

=== Round 5 (ANZAC Day) ===
Round 5
26 April 2009, 4:10 pm	Melbourne	def. by	Adelaide	Melbourne Cricket Ground (crowd: 14,129)	Report
0.1 (1); 0.3 (3); 1.6 (12); 4.10 (34)	Q1; Q2; Q3; Final	2.4 (16); 4.6 (30); 5.7 (37); 7.9 (51)	Umpires: Craig Hendrie, Jason Armstrong, Justin Schmitt; Most DT Pts: Simon Goodwin (Adelaide), 127 pts
Dunn 2 McDonald, McLean 1	Goals	Tippett 2 Johncock, McLeod, Stevens, Porplyzia, Walker 1
McLean, Davey, Moloney	Best	Goodwin, Vince, Thompson, Bock
Nil	Injuries	Nil
Nil	Reports	Nil
Melbourne's first half score of 3-point was their lowest since Round 1, 1991 against West Coast.

=== Round 6 ===
Round 6
2 May 2009, 7:10 pm	Port Adelaide	def.	Adelaide	AAMI Stadium (crowd: 41,558)	Report
3.4 (22); 8.6 (54); 11.12 (78); 15.15 (105)	Q1; Q2; Q3; Final	2.0 (12); 5.2 (32); 8.5 (53); 12.7 (79)	Umpires: Matt Stevic, Ray Chamberlain, Chris Kamolins; Most DT Pts: Bernie Vince (Adelaide), 130 pts
Tredrea, Motlop, Gray 3 Cornes, Pearce 2 Ebert, Lade 1	Goals	Porplyzia 3 Vince, Petrenko, Dangerfield 2 Thompson, Doughty, Walker 1
Brogan, Cornes, Salopek, Motlop	Best	Vince, Bock, Thompson
Hartlett (hamstring)	Injuries	Nil
Nil	Reports	Nil

=== Round 7 ===
Round 7
10 May 2009, 12:40 pm	Adelaide	def. by	Western Bulldogs	AAMI Stadium (crowd: 31,472)	Report
3.5 (23); 5.9 (39); 6.12 (48); 12.14 (86)	Q1; Q2; Q3; Final	2.4 (16); 5.10 (40); 13.15 (93); 17.16 (118)	Umpires: Chris Donlon, Craig Hendrie, Mathew James; Most DT Pts: Lindsay Gilbee (Western Bulldogs), 120 pts
Walker 4 Knights 3 Porplyzia 2 Tippett, Goodwin, Edwards 1	Goals	Murphy 4 Akermanis 3 Hill, Eagleton 2 Cooney, Johnson, Giansiracussa, Gilbee, Hahn, Minson 1
Walker, Tippett, Knights	Best	Johnson, Akermanis, Eagleton, Boyd
Goodwin (ankle)	Injuries	Griffen (corked buttock), Higgins (groin)
Nil	Reports	Nil
This was Adelaide's first loss to the Western Bulldogs at AAMI Stadium since 2001.

=== Round 8 ===
Round 8
16 May 2009, 6:40 pm	Brisbane Lions	def.	Adelaide	The Gabba (crowd: 27,767)	Report
3.4 (22); 6.4 (40); 13.7 (85); 18.11 (119)	Q1; Q2; Q3; Final	5.5 (35); 7.8 (50); 9.9 (63); 12.11 (83)	Umpires: Michael Vozzo, Heath Ryan, Jason Armstrong; Most DT Pts: Justin Sherman (Brisbane Lions), 162 pts
Bradshaw 5 Sherman 3 Brown, Polkinghorne, Proud 2 Black, Rich, Clark, Harding 1	Goals	Porplyzia, Knights, Walker 2 Edwards, Mackay, Dangerfield, Moran, Reilly, Tippett 1
Sherman, Bradshaw, Black, Johnstone	Best	Edwards, Mackay, Goodwin
Merrett (ankle), Adcock (leg), Patfull (jaw)	Injuries	Nil
Nil	Reports	Nil
Daniel Bradshaw surpassed Alastair Lynch's record of 460 goals for Brisbane.

=== Round 9 (Indigenous Round) ===
Round 9
23 May 2009, 2:40 pm	Adelaide	def.	Carlton	AAMI Stadium (crowd: 41,107)	Report
3.4 (22); 8.6 (54); 9.11 (65); 15.14 (104)	Q1; Q2; Q3; Final	0.3 (3); 0.5 (5); 5.8 (38); 8.12 (60)	Umpires: Scott McLaren, Craig Hendrie, Troy Pannell; Most DT Pts: Nick Stevens (Carlton), 131 pts
Knights 5 Tippett, Porplyzia, Vince 2 Doughty, Otten, Reilly, Dangerfield 1	Goals	Kreuzer, Murphy, Stevens 2 Betts, Fevola 1
Doughty, Edwards, Knights, Thompson	Best	Murphy, Stevens, Kreuzer
Nil	Injuries	Waite (knee)
Nil	Reports	Nil
This was the second time for the season that Adelaide had kept its opposition goalless to half time, the first being in Round 5 against Melbourne.

=== Round 10 ===
Round 10
31 May 2009, 12:40 pm	Adelaide	def.	Hawthorn	AAMI Stadium (crowd: 40,035)	Report
7.1 (43); 12.4 (75); 12.5 (77); 16.10 (106)	Q1; Q2; Q3; Final	2.1 (13); 4.4 (20); 8.6 (54); 12.7 (79)	Umpires: Shaun Ryan, Robert Findlay, Ray Chamberlain; Most DT Pts: Brad Sewell (Hawthorn), 133 pts
Walker 5 Knights 4 Doughty 2 Vince, Tippett, Dangerfield, Douglas, Stevens 1	Goals	Rioli 4 Franklin 3 Bateman 2 Lewis, Roughead, Dew 1
Thompson, Knights, Walker, Bock	Best	Rioli, Sewell, Lewis
Bock (hamstring)	Injuries	Thorp (foot), Whitecross (hamstring), Young (hip)
Nil	Reports	Mitchell (striking)

=== Round 11 (Women's Round) ===
Round 11
7 June 2009, 12:40 pm	Essendon	def. by	Adelaide	Etihad Stadium (crowd: 39,458)	Report
5.3 (33); 10.4 (64); 16.4 (100); 18.6 (114)	Q1; Q2; Q3; Final	3.0 (18); 9.0 (54); 15.2 (92); 21.4 (130)	Umpires: Hayden Kennedy, Stefan Grun, Robert Findlay; Most DT Pts: Tyson Edwards (Adelaide), 166 pts
Lucas 4 Watson 3 Monfries, Skipworth 2 Ryder, Dyson, McPhee, McVeigh, Lovett, Reimers, Davey 1	Goals	Tippett 7 Knights 5 Walker, Douglas 2 Dangerfield, Maric, McLeod, Porplyzia, Vince 1
Stanton, Lovett, Watson	Best	Edwards, Tippett, Knights, Vince
Slattery (hamstring), Laycock (foot)	Injuries	Goodwin (knee)
Ryder (rough conduct)	Reports	Nil
This game was Tyson Edwards' 300th, notably gaining 41 possessions.

=== Round 12 (Split Round) ===
Round 12
14 June 2009, 4:10 pm	Adelaide	def.	Kangaroos	AAMI Stadium (crowd: 30,173)	Report
2.4 (16); 3.6 (24); 5.9 (39); 8.13 (61)	Q1; Q2; Q3; Final	0.0 (0); 1.2 (8); 2.5 (17); 3.6 (24)	Umpires: Sam Hay, Shaun Ryan, Michael Avon; Most DT Pts: Michael Doughty (Adelaide), 132 pts
Porplyzia 3 Knights, Edwards, Bock, Tippett, Walker, Vince 1	Goals	Jones, Edwards, Thomas 1
Thompson, Porplyzia, Bock, Doughty	Best	Firrito, Thompson, Simpson
Reilly (hamstring)	Injuries	Ziebell (leg), Thomas (hamstring)
Nil	Reports	Nil
This game was North Melbourne's Adam Simpson's 300th game.; North Melbourne’s score was the lowest in the AFL since Round 4, 1999, when Essendon kicked 3.5 (23) against West Coast.; It was the first score of three or fewer goals since Fremantle kicked 3.7 (25) against Geelong in Round 20 of 2004.; North Melbourne last kicked a lower score in Round 12, 1971 when they kicked 3.5 (23) against Carlton.

=== Round 13 ===
Round 13
27 June 2009, 2:40 pm	Adelaide	def.	Sydney	AAMI Stadium (crowd: 38,064)	Report
1.3 (9); 3.4 (22); 9.7 (61); 12.13 (85)	Q1; Q2; Q3; Final	2.2 (14); 6.5 (41); 8.6 (54); 10.9 (69)	Umpires: Hayden Kennedy, Scott McLaren, Matthew Nicholls; Most DT Pts: Martin Mattner (Sydney), 126 pts
Porplyzia 3 Knights, Edwards, Bock, Tippett, Walker, Vince 1	Goals	Hall 4 Mattner, Jack, Shaw, Kirk, Brabazon, Crouch 1
Porplyzia, Vince, Tippett, Thompson	Best	Kirk, O'Keefe, Mattner
Maric (cut chin), Otten (cut head), Moran (jarred knee)	Injuries	Nil
Nil	Reports	Barry Hall (striking)
This game was infamous for Barry Hall punching Ben Rutten in the chin; he was reported for this.

=== Round 14 ===
Round 14
4 July 2009, 6:40 pm	Richmond	def. by	Adelaide	Gold Coast Stadium (crowd: 11,174)	Report
2.1 (13); 5.3 (33); 8.5 (53); 13.7 (85)	Q1; Q2; Q3; Final	5.3 (33); 9.6 (60); 14.9 (93); 15.12 (102)	Umpires: Damien Sully, Stuart Wenn, Troy Pannell; Most DT Pts: Scott Thompson (Adelaide), 124 pts
Nahas 4 Jackson, Morton 2, Hislop, Tambling, Deledio, Graham, Riewoldt 1	Goals	Tippett 5 Mackay, Stevens, Knights 2 Thompson, Douglas, Porplyzia, McLeod 1
Nahas, Tuck, Cousins	Best	McLeod, Johncock, Tippett, Edwards
Foley (hamstring)	Injuries	Nil
Nil	Reports	Nil

=== Round 15 ===
Round 15
11 July 2009, 7:10 pm	Adelaide	def.	Fremantle	AAMI Stadium (crowd: 32,451)	Report
5.4 (34); 10.9 (69); 12.14 (86); 19.16 (130)	Q1; Q2; Q3; Final	0.1 (1); 0.1 (1); 1.5 (11); 1.7 (13)	Umpires: Chris Donlon, Sam Hay, Scott Jeffery; Most DT Pts: Jason Porplyzia (Adelaide), 121 pts
Tippett, Porplyzia 5 Dangerfield 3 Stevens, Knights 2 McLeod, Shirley 1	Goals	Murphy 1
Dangerfield, Porplyzia, Otten, Thompson	Best	Broughton, Duffield, Hasleby
Nil	Injuries	Nil
James Sellar (negligent contact with an umpire)	Reports	Nil
This was the third occasion that Adelaide had held their opponents goalless in the first half, in 2009.; This was Fremantle's lowest score in its AFL history.; The loss was Fremantle's biggest defeat in its history.; This was the lowest score by any team in VFL/AFL history since Round 16, 1961, when Richmond kicked 0.8 (8) against St Kilda.; It was the first score of 0, 1 or 2 goals since Round 11, 1991 when Carlton kicked 1.10 (16) against Footscray.

=== Round 16 ===
Round 16
19 July 2009, 4:10 pm	St Kilda	def.	Adelaide	Etihad Stadium (crowd: 31940)	Report
4.4 (28); 10.6 (66); 13.13 (91); 15.15 (105)	Q1; Q2; Q3; Final	4.2 (26); 5.2 (32); 5.4 (34); 7.6 (48)	Umpires: Stefan Grun, Simon Meredith, Heath Ryan; Most DT Pts: Farren Ray (St Kilda), 160 pts
Milne, Riewoldt 4 Schneider 2 Gram, Koschitzke, McEvoy, McQualter, Ray 1	Goals	Stevens, Tippett 2 Dangerfield, Knights, Martin
Ray, Riewoldt, Milne, Gram	Best	Thompson, Goodwin, Rutten
Koschitzke (split webbing)	Injuries	Mackay (hamstring), Porplyzia (corked knee), Dangerfield (head)
Zac Dawson (rough conduct), Justin Koschitzke (striking)	Reports	Nil

=== Round 17 (Rivalry Round) ===
Round 17
26 July 2009, 4:10 pm	Adelaide	def.	Port Adelaide	AAMI Stadium (crowd: 46,859)	Report
2.5 (17); 9.7 (61); 12.15 (85); 19.18 (132)	Q1; Q2; Q3; Final	4.0 (24); 4.4 (28); 8.5 (53); 9.8 (62)	Umpires: Michael Vozzo, Heath Ryan, Michael Avon; Most DT Pts: Domenic Cassisi (Port Adelaide), 126 pts
Burton 4 Knights 3 Goodwin, McLeod, Tippett, Doughty 2 Dangerfield, Vince, Bock, Porplyzia 1	Goals	Gray 3 Pearce, Cornes, Westhoff, Cassisi, Davenport, Boak 1
Bock, Reilly, Doughty, Vince	Best	Cassisi, Cornes, Rodan
Otten (corked thigh), Martin (knee)	Injuries	Cornes (knee), Surjan (calf), Chaplin (bruised shin), Boak (corked thigh)
Nil	Reports	Nil

=== Round 18 ===
Round 18
1 August 2009, 1:40 pm	Geelong	def.	Adelaide	Skilled Stadium (crowd: 21,686)	Report
3.3 (21); 7.7 (49); 11.7 (73); 14.9 (93)	Q1; Q2; Q3; Final	3.2 (20); 4.7 (31); 9.11 (65); 13.13 (91)	Umpires: Matt Stevic, Scott McLaren, Matthew Nicholls; Most DT Pts: Paul Chapman (Geelong), 136 pts
Chapman 6, Ablett, Mooney 2 Johnson, Stokes, Bartel, Selwood 1	Goals	Tippett, Burton 4 Johncock, Doughty, Knights, Stevens, Reilly 1
Chapman, Bartel, Selwood, Milburn	Best	Tippett, Burton, Reilly
Nil	Injuries	Bock (bruised heel)
Nil	Reports	Nil

=== Round 19 ===
Round 19
8 August 2009, 7:10 pm	Adelaide	def. by	Collingwood	AAMI Stadium (crowd: 45,128)	Report
2.4 (16); 3.10 (28); 6.13 (49); 9.14 (68)	Q1; Q2; Q3; Final	2.5 (17); 3.7 (25); 8.7 (55); 13.11 (89)	Umpires: Scott McLaren, Heath Ryan, Scott Jeffery; Most DT Pts: Alan Didak (Collingwood), 141 pts
Porplyzia 3 Knights 2 Burton, Tippett, McLeod, Symes 1	Goals	Anthony 3 Dawes, Didak, Cloke, Wood 2 Dick, Thomas 1
Goodwin, Vince, Porplyzia	Best	Didak, Swan, Pendlebury, O’Brien
Burton (corked buttock)	Injuries	Nil
Nil	Reports	Nil

=== Round 20 (Green Round) ===
Round 20
14 August 2009, 7:10 pm	Hawthorn	def. by	Adelaide	Melbourne Cricket Ground (crowd: 32,583)	Report
5.3 (33); 5.5 (35); 8.10 (58); 9.13 (67)	Q1; Q2; Q3; Final	1.2 (8); 6.8 (44); 12.9 (81); 13.16 (94)	Umpires: Stephen McBurney, Ray Chamberlain, Simon Meredith; Most DT Pts: Ben McGlynn (Hawthorn), 122 pts
Franklin 4 Lewis, Sewell, McGlynn, Rioli, Morton 1	Goals	Hentschel 4 Thompson, Porplyzia 2 Tippett, Vince, Doughty, Douglas, Knights 1
Lewis, Franklin, McGlynn	Best	McLeod, Hentschel, Doughty, Vince
Campbell (hand)	Injuries	Nil
Nil	Reports	Nil
Rory Sloane made his AFL debut this week

=== Round 21 ===
Round 21
22 August 2009, 2:40 pm	Adelaide	def.	West Coast	AAMI Stadium (crowd: 39,640)	Report
2.4 (16); 8.8 (56); 12.12 (84); 18.14 (122)	Q1; Q2; Q3; Final	2.2 (14); 4.2 (26); 5.5 (35); 7.6 (48)	Umpires: Shane Stewart, Justin Schmitt, Simon Meredith; Most DT Pts: Scott Thompson (Adelaide), 127 pts
Porplyzia 6 Thompson, Hentschel, Douglas, Maric, Knights 2 Tippett, Rutten 1	Goals	LeCras, Kennedy 2 Swift, Lynch, Embley 1
Goodwin, Porplyzia, Vince, Thompson	Best	Selwood, Ebert, Houlihan
Shirley (hamstring), Thompson (bruised hip)	Injuries	Davis (concussion)
Nil	Reports	Nil

=== Round 22 ===
Round 22
29 August 2009, 3:40 pm	Carlton	def. by	Adelaide	Etihad Stadium (crowd: 42,356)	Report
7.2 (44); 10.5 (65); 12.6 (78); 16.8 (104)	Q1; Q2; Q3; Final	6.3 (39); 13.7 (85); 20.11 (131); 27.14 (176)	Umpires: Michael Vozzo, Stephen McBurney, Simon Meredith; Most DT Pts: Bernie Vince (Adelaide), 134 pts
Fevola 5 Stevens 2 Carrazzo, Joseph, Walker, Gibbs, Yarran, Simpson, Murphy, Hampson, O'hAilpin 1	Goals	Knights, Porplyzia, Tippett 4 Vince 3 Burton, Dangerfield, Hentschel 2 McLeod, Symes, Mackay, Sellar, Goodwin, Thompson 1
Gibbs, Stevens, Kreuzer	Best	Vince, McLeod, Tippett, Porplyzia
Nil	Injuries	Van Berlo (back strain), Mackay (ankle)
Nil	Reports	Nil
This was Adelaide's fifth highest score in the club's history.; Brett Burton's mark in the third quarter went on to win the AFL Mark of the Year award.

== Finals ==
=== Week one ===
Elimination final
4 September 2009, 7:45 pm	Adelaide	def.	Essendon	AAMI Stadium (crowd: 50,393)
4.3 (27); 12.4 (76); 18.9 (117); 26.10 (166)	Q1; Q2; Q3; Final	3.3 (21); 5.7 (37); 8.8 (56); 10.10 (70)	Umpires: Stephen McBurney, Matt Stevic, Shaun Ryan; Most DT Pts: Andrew McLeod (Adelaide), 114 pts
Porplyzia 5 Tippett 4 Knights, Burton 3 Dangerfield, Douglas 2 Vince, Edwards, Maric, Hentschel, Thompson, Mackay, Sellar 1	Goals	McPhee 4 Skipworth 2 Monfries, Quinn, Stanton, Lovett 1
Vince, McLeod, Doughty, Porplyzia	Best	McPhee, Welsh, Stanton
Nil	Injuries	Nil
Nil	Reports	Lovett-Murray (rough conduct), McVeigh (striking)
This was Essendon's first final since 2004.

=== Week two ===
Semi-final
12 September 2009, 7:00 pm	Collingwood	def.	Adelaide	Melbourne Cricket Ground (crowd: 62,184)
1.4 (10); 3.5 (23); 9.7 (61); 12.11 (83)	Q1; Q2; Q3; Final	6.3 (39); 7.7 (49); 7.9 (51); 11.12 (78)	Umpires: Brett Rosebury, Ray Chamberlain, Shane McInerney; Most DT Pts: Steele Sidebottom (Collingwood), 122 pts
Johnson, Dick 2 Lockyer, O'Brien, Wellingham, Swan, Cloke, Macaffer, Brown, Anthony 1	Goals	Tippett 4 Dangerfield, Thompson 2 Hentschel, Knights, Burton 1
Maxwell, Sidebottom, Shaw, Swan	Best	Vince, Goodwin, Johncock
Nil	Injuries	Knights (hamstring)
Nil	Reports	Nil

== Statistics ==
=== Team ===
Highest score	27.14 (176) vs Carlton in round 22
Lowest score	7.6 (48) vs St Kilda in round 16

Highest ladder position	5 after rounds 14 - 15, 17 and 22
Lowest ladder position	12 after rounds 2, 4 and 7 - 8
Highest percentage	117.61 after round 22
Lowest percentage	83.4 after round 8

Home W/L record	7-4
Away W/L record	6-4

Final Score for	344.231 (2295) - rank 5
Final Score against	284.199 (1903) - rank 15

=== Individual ===
Most games	24 - Bernie Vince, Andrew McLeod, Michael Doughty, Andy Otten, Ben Rutten, Jason Porplyzia and Kurt Tippett
Most kicks	336 - Bernie Vince; 310 - Andrew McLeod
Most handballs	352 - Scott Thompson; 328 - Simon Goodwin
Most disposals	659 - Bernie Vince; 605 - Scott Thompson
Most hit-outs	358 - Ivan Maric; 243 - Kurt Tippett
Most tackles	99 - Scott Thompson; 89 - Michael Doughty
Most marks	142 - Bernie Vince, Ben Rutten
Most goals	57 - Jason Porplyzia; 55 - Kurt Tippett

== Ladder ==
2009 AFL ladder
Pos	Team	Pld	W	L	D	PF	PA	PP	Pts	
1	St Kilda	22	20	2	0	2197	1411	155.7	80	Finals series
2	Geelong (P)	22	18	4	0	2312	1815	127.4	72	Finals series
3	Western Bulldogs	22	15	7	0	2378	1940	122.6	60	Finals series
4	Collingwood	22	15	7	0	2174	1778	122.3	60	Finals series
5	Adelaide	22	14	8	0	2104	1789	117.6	56	Finals series
6	Brisbane Lions	22	13	8	1	2017	1890	106.7	54	Finals series
7	Carlton	22	13	9	0	2270	2055	110.5	52	Finals series
8	Essendon	22	10	11	1	2080	2127	97.8	42	Finals series
9	Hawthorn	22	9	13	0	1962	2120	92.5	36	
10	Port Adelaide	22	9	13	0	1990	2244	88.7	36	
11	West Coast	22	8	14	0	1893	2029	93.3	32	
12	Sydney	22	8	14	0	1888	2027	93.1	32	
13	North Melbourne	22	7	14	1	1680	2015	83.4	30	
14	Fremantle	22	6	16	0	1747	2259	77.3	24	
15	Richmond	22	5	16	1	1774	2388	74.3	22	
16	Melbourne	22	4	18	0	1706	2285	74.7	16	

Source: AFL ladder
Rules for classification: 1) points; 2) percentage; 3) number of points for.
(P) Premiers
