= 2008 Adelaide Football Club season =

Adelaide Football Club
2008 season
- President: Bill Sanders
- Coach: Neil Craig
- Captain: Simon Goodwin
- Home ground: AAMI Stadium
- Pre-season competition: Runners up
- AFL season: 5th
- Finals series: Elimination final
- Best and Fairest: Nathan Bock
- Leading goalkicker: Brett Burton (34)
- Highest home attendance: 45,524 vs. Port Adelaide (6 April 2008)
- Lowest home attendance: 35,649 vs. Melbourne (18 May 2008)
- Average home attendance: 40,678

The 2008 AFL season was the Adelaide Football Club's 18th season in the Australian Football League (AFL).

== Playing list changes ==
=== In ===
Tony Armstrong (draft pick 58), Myke Cook (draft pick 38), Patrick Dangerfield (draft pick 10), Jarrhan Jacky (draft pick 30), Aaron Kite (draft pick 71), Brad Moran (traded from North Melbourne for draft pick 37), Andy Otten (draft pick 27), Brad Symes (traded from Port Adelaide for draft pick 28), Taylor Walker (draft pick 75)

=== Rookie ===
Ed Curnow (rookie draft pick 40), Brodie Martin (rookie draft pick 52), James Moss (rookie draft pick 9), Jared Petrenko (rookie draft pick 25)

=== Out ===
Rhys Archard, Matthew Bode, John Hinge, Ben Hudson (traded to Western Bulldogs), Andrew McIntyre, Martin Mattner (traded to Sydney for draft pick 28), John Meesen (traded to Melbourne for draft pick 37), Ian Perrie, Darren Pfeiffer, Mark Ricciuto (retired), Jason Torney, James Turner, Scott Welsh

== NAB Cup ==
The pre-season competition provided much hope for Adelaide fans stemming from their team's progression to the Grand Final. Adelaide was initially able to beat the more fancied Collingwood in Dubai, before accounting for Fremantle and Hawthorn (both at home at AAMI Stadium). Adelaide had kicked more supergoals than their to-be opposition St Kilda and so was given the privilege of hosting the NAB Cup Grand Final. It was the second time in three years, and 5th time overall, that the Crows had reached the pre-season cup final. However they were unable to defeat St Kilda, losing by five points.

The match was heavily criticised by some in the Victorian media for having the lowest crowd attendance for a pre-season grand final in history. In particular Adelaide fans were criticised for not attending their team's home final; though most media outlets spreading this criticism neglected to take into account the extreme heat.

Despite their narrow loss, fans saw glimpses of the future for the club. The rejuvenated midfield, replacing ageing champions such as Tyson Edwards and Simon Goodwin, freeing them to move into the forward line. A new forward line thus emerged, featuring young key position forwards James Sellar and Kurt Tippett – both tipped to lead Adelaide's attack in the new era – along with the addition of veterans Andrew McLeod, Edwards and Goodwin to provide experience and quality in what had long been Adelaide's weakness.

== Home and away season ==
2008 Season Results
Round	Date	Opponent	Venue (H/A)	Score	Ladder Position	Percentage	W/L
1	23 March	Western Bulldogs	Telstra Dome (A)	18.15 (123) – 19.12 (126)	9	97.62	0–1
2	29 March	West Coast	AAMI Stadium (H)	21.7 (133) – 8.9 (57)	6	139.89	1–1
3	6 April	Port Adelaide	AAMI Stadium (H)	12.13 (85) – 11.13 (79)	5	130.15	2–1
4	13 April	Hawthorn	Aurora Stadium (A)	10.10 (70) – 17.12 (114)	6	109.31	2–2
5	19 April	Fremantle	AAMI Stadium (H)	12.16 (88) – 10.11 (71)	5	111.63	3–2
6	26 April	Carlton	MCG (A)	16.15 (111) – 11.15 (81)	4	115.53	4–2
7	3 May	North Melbourne	AAMI Stadium (H)	15.17 (107) – 11.8 (74)	4	119.10	5–2
8	18 May	Melbourne	AAMI Stadium (H)	22.18 (150) – 11.8 (74)	4	128.25	6–2
9	24 May	West Coast	Subiaco Oval (A)	5.17 (47) – 14.13 (97)	4	118.24	6–3
10	30 May	Essendon	AAMI Stadium (H)	9.20 (74) – 10.9 (69)	4	117.34	7–3
11	7 June	Richmond	MCG (A)	22.14 (146) – 14.12 (96)	4	120.90	8–3
12	14 June	Hawthorn	AAMI Stadium (H)	10.12 (72) – 11.10 (76)	5	118.93	8–4
13	21 June	Brisbane Lions	The Gabba (A)	10.10 (70) – 11.17 (83)	5	116.32	8–5
14	4 July	Geelong	AAMI Stadium (H)	8.8 (56) – 18.16 (124)	6	109.09	8–6
15	12 July	Collingwood	MCG (A)	11.8 (74) – 15.16 (106)	6	105.95	8–7
16	20 July	Port Adelaide	AAMI Stadium (A)	11.14 (80) – 13.14 (92)	9	104.72	8–8
17	26 July	Sydney	SCG (A)	11.11 (77) – 6.17 (53)	7	106.18	9–8
18	3 August	Carlton	AAMI Stadium (H)	13.16 (94) – 12.14 (86)	6	106.35	10–8
19	10 August	Richmond	AAMI Stadium (H)	16.12 (109) – 6.9 (45)	6	110.11	11–8
20	16 August	Essendon	Telstra Dome (A)	19.15 (129) – 10.13 (73)	6	113.01	12–8
21	24 August	St Kilda	Telstra Dome (A)	6.11 (47) – 13.17 (95)	6	109.60	12–9
22	30 August	Western Bulldogs	AAMI Stadium (H)	10.16 (76) – 9.13 (67)	5	109.74	13–9

The season got off to an anticlimactic start in a high-scoring shootout at the Telstra Dome as the Crows went down to the Western Bulldogs by three points, when Nathan Bock missed a set shot to win the game on the final siren. The club surprised many by thrashing a highly-rated West Coast in round 2 at home, winning by 76 points. Round 3 was a heavily anticipated Showdown, playing a Port Adelaide side which had lost the first two rounds of the season. With the Crows having won six of their last seven Showdowns, a win in Showdown XXIV would square the ledger with 12 victories each. The Crows managed to attain a 22-point in the final quarter, before Port made one last scoring surge. However, the Crows held firm and won by six points to a home crowd of over 45,000.

The following week, round 4, Adelaide struggled in a 44-point loss to Hawthorn in Launceston. They bounced back to win four straight games afterwards, helped by three of those being played at home. Round 5 saw a 17-point win over Fremantle, Round 6 a 30-point win over Carlton at the MCG, Round 7 a 33-point win over North Melbourne, and Round 8 a 76-point thrashing of Melbourne. After the win against Melbourne, Adelaide stood 5–0 at home for the first time in its history.

The Crows looked to continue their winning streak against a struggling West Coast in a tough trip to Subiaco Oval in Round 9. However, inaccurate kicking cost and a slow start cost the Crows dearly. Adelaide lost by 50 points to a team they defeated by 76 points only seven rounds previously. In round 10, Adelaide overcame Essendon in a close and hard-fought match, winning by five points at home. Brett Burton was reported for a head-high bump to Essendon's Henry Slattery and accepted a two-match ban by the AFL's match-review committee.

Round 11 saw the Crows return to the MCG to face an under-performing Richmond. Continuing a worrying trend in matches away from home, Adelaide started slowly and were fortunate to only trail by 14 points at half-time. After the long-break, however, the Crows woke from their slumbering style and proceeded to kick 15 goals to five in the second half, to run out easy winners by 50 points. At the halfway point in the season, Adelaide had an 8–3 record with a percentage of 120.9, and sat two points clear of Sydney in fourth spot.

Round 12 saw Adelaide lose a tight encounter against Hawthorn at home by four points. Hawthorn player Luke Hodge kicked the winning goal in the dying minutes. It was Hawthorn's third away win against Adelaide, but their first since an infamous 97-point thrashing in Round 9, 1994. Adelaide dropped to fifth on the premiership ladder after the loss. Adelaide slipped to 8–5 after losing to Brisbane at the Gabba by 13 points in round 13. Although leading by 12 points at half-time, and two at three-quarter time, Adelaide were outrun by Brisbane in the last term. The Crows couldn't get their forward structure despite the return of Burton from suspension.

In Round 14, Adelaide were visited by league leaders Geelong and promptly defeated by 68 points. Adelaide were never in the contest, scoring only one point in the first quarter. In round 15, Adelaide travelled to face Collingwood at the MCG. The Crows led by as much as 22 points midway through the second term but faded after half-time to lose by 32. This was the first time the team had lost four games in a row under coach Neil Craig. Added to the loss were injuries to Burton (knee) and Porplyzia (shoulder), the former of which would end his season.

In front of the smallest crowd in Showdown history, Adelaide lost its return game against Port Adelaide by 12 points in round 16. Adelaide slipped out of the top eight after this loss, which was their fifth loss in a row. Adelaide then faced Sydney at the SCG in round 17 as underdogs, even though they had a dominant record over the Swans since 2002. Adelaide were inspired by the sudden return of Porplyzia, who kicked five goals, bringing home a 24-point win. Adelaide had now won nine of its past 10 games against Sydney.

Dominant second and third quarters, where they kicked 11 goals to five, helped Adelaide to a tight eight-point win over Carlton at AAMI Stadium in their round 18 clash. Brad Moran notably popped up with four goals at full-forward, a move that was forced by a heavy knock to Jason Porplyzia in the second term, which redislocated his shoulder. At the end of the round, the Crows sat in sixth place with a 10–8 win/loss ratio. In a 63-point win against Richmond in Round 19, Andrew McLeod celebrated his 300th game in difficult wet conditions. Adelaide handled the ball far better than the Tigers, kicking 7.2 to 0.1 in the second term to lead by nine goals at half-time. As a result, the Crows held on to sixth spot on the AFL ladder, four points clear of Collingwood.

Adelaide then travelled to the Telstra Dome to play Essendon in Round 20. After the game was a low-scoring slog for the first quarter and a half, the Crows broke away to win by 56 points. Key forward Nick Gill finally delivered on much promise, booting five goals. Controversial draftee Patrick Dangerfield also debuted. The win guaranteed the Crows a place in the finals. After a win by North Melbourne over Carlton, Adelaide sat in fifth position with 48 points and a percentage of 113.01. This was notably the first time Adelaide had defeated Essendon in Melbourne, after 11 attempts spread over 17 years.

A return to the Telstra Dome in Round 21 saw the Crows play against a St Kilda looking to confirm a finals position with a win. After quarter time, Adelaide only kicked three goals to St Kilda's 12 to lose by 48 points. The loss meant Adelaide slipped to sixth on the ladder. In the final round, Adelaide knocked off the Western Bulldogs by nine points in wet conditions at AAMI Stadium. It was their fifth win in six games. The win initially moved Adelaide into the top four, but St Kilda's 108-point win over Essendon the next day dropped Adelaide from fourth to fifth spot. This meant a home elimination final against Collingwood, instead of an away qualifying final against Geelong; losing the double-chance.

== Finals ==
The fifth spot finish proved costly as the Crows continued their poor home record against Collingwood and were defeated in the elimination final by 31 points. Scott Stevens was brilliant and kicked six goals as Adelaide trailed for most of the game but threatened Collingwood with a final quarter comeback. However, Collingwood pulled away with unselfish team play as Adelaide faltered. Nathan Bassett played his last game and came out onto the ground after the game to have a kick with the fans.

== Statistics ==
=== Team ===
Highest score	22.18 (150) vs Melbourne in round 8
Lowest score	5.17 (47) vs West Coast in round 9, and 6.11 (47) vs St Kilda in round 21

Highest ladder position	4 after rounds 6–11
Lowest ladder position	9 after rounds 1 and 16
Highest percentage	139.89 after round 2
Lowest percentage	97.62 after round 1

Home W/L record	9–2
Away W/L record	4–7

Final Score for	287.295 (2017) – rank 13
Final Score against	260.278 (1838) – rank 2

=== Individual ===
Most games	23 – Nathan Bassett, Nathan Bock, Michael Doughty, Tyson Edwards, Simon Goodwin, Scott Stevens, Scott Thompson and Nathan van Berlo
Most kicks	335 – Nathan Bock; 306 – Tyson Edwards
Most handballs	264 – Michael Doughty; 254 – Scott Thompson
Most disposals	556 – Scott Thompson; 503 – Michael Doughty
Most hit-outs	274 – Ivan Maric; 202 – Jonathon Griffin
Most tackles	109 – Scott Thompson; 84 – Robert Shirley
Most marks	162 – Nathan Bock; 159 – Scott Stevens
Most goals	34 – Brett Burton; 33 – Simon Goodwin
