= 2015 Port Adelaide Football Club season =

Port Adelaide Football Club
2015 season
- President: David Koch
- Coach: Ken Hinkley
- Captain: Travis Boak
- Home ground: Adelaide Oval (53,583 capacity)
- Highest home attendance: 54,468 (Round 14 vs. Adelaide)
- Lowest home attendance: 37,635 (Round 6 vs. West Coast)
- Average home attendance: 46,622
- Club membership: 60,246

The 2015 Port Adelaide Football Club season was the club's 136th year in a senior football competition and its 19th season in the AFL.

== 2015 squad ==
Port Adelaide Football Club
Senior list		Rookie List	Coaching Staff
1 Travis Boak (c); 2 Kane Mitchell; 3 Jake Neade; 4 Paddy Ryder; 5 Matthew Broadbent; 6 Angus Monfries; 7 Brad Ebert (vc); 8 Hamish Hartlett; 9 Robbie Gray; 11 John Butcher; 12 Jackson Trengove; 13 Cameron O'Shea; 14 Paul Stewart; 15 Karl Amon; 16 Ollie Wines; 17 Tom Clurey; 19 Matthew White; 20 Chad Wingard; 21 Jared Polec; 22 Mason Shaw	23 Matthew Lobbe (vc); 24 Jarman Impey; 25 Logan Austin; 26 Andrew Moore; 27 Alipate Carlile; 28 Jay Schulz; 29 Jasper Pittard; 30 Sam Colquhoun; 31 Mitchell Harvey; 32 Dougal Howard; 33 Darcy Byrne-Jones; 34 Jarrad Redden; 36 Jack Hombsch; 37 Jesse Palmer; 38 Billy Frampton; 39 Justin Westhoff; 40 Aaron Young; 41 Brendon Ah Chee; 42 Tom Jonas	43 Johann Wagner (B); 44 Tom Logan; 46 Sam Gray; 47 Sam Russell; 48 Nathan Krakouer	Head coach: Ken Hinkley; Assistant coaches: Shaun Hart (Director of Coaching); Michael Voss (Midfield Manager); Tyson Edwards (Forwards Line Coach); Matthew Nicks (Backs Line Coach); Garry Hocking (SANFL Senior Coach); Aaron Greaves (Development Manager); Trent Hentschel (Player Development Coach); Jacob Surjan (Player Development Coach); Stuart Cochrane (Player Development Coach); Legend: (c) Captain(s); (vc) Vice-captain(s); (vet) Veteran listed; Long-term injury list; Upgraded rookie(s); (B) Category B rookie(s); Updated: 16 August 2015; Source(s): Playing list, Coaching staff

== 2015 season ==
=== Pre-season ===
==== NAB Challenge ====
===== Week 1 =====
	2015 NAB Challenge
Sunday, 8 March 4:10 pm	Port Adelaide 1.11.14 (89)	def.	West Coast 0.7.7 (49)	Norwood Oval (crowd: 9,212)	Report

===== Week 2 =====
	2015 NAB Challenge
Saturday, 14 March 4:40 pm	Richmond 1.14.10 (103)	def.	Port Adelaide 0.5.7 (37)	Lavington SG (crowd: 8,451)	Report

===== Week 3 =====
	2015 NAB Challenge
Saturday, 21 March 3:40 pm	Port Adelaide 0.13.15 (93)	def. by	Adelaide 3.13.12 (117)	AAMI Stadium (crowd: 13,971)	Report

== AFL season summary ==
Rd	**Day**	**Date**	**Time**; **PM**	**Opponent**	**Scores** (Port Adelaide's scores indicated in **bold**)			**Venue**	**Attendance**	**Ladder** **position**
**Rd**	**Day**	**Date**	**Time**; **PM**	**Opponent**	Home	Away	Result	**Venue**	**Attendance**	**Ladder** **position**
1	Sun	5 April	4:40	Fremantle	11.9 (75)	**10.8 (68)**	Lost by 7	Subiaco Oval	34,099	10th
2	Sat	11 April	7:10	Sydney	**6.8 (44)**	14.8 (92)	Lost by 48	Adelaide Oval	49,765	15th
3	Sat	18 April	7:20	North Melbourne	16.9 (105)	**17.11 (113)**	Won by 8	Docklands	22,586	13th
4	Sat	25 April	7:10	Hawthorn	**15.9 (99)**	13.13 (91)	Won by 8	Adelaide Oval	50,675	13th
5	Sun	3 May	4:10	Adelaide	13.13 (91)	**18.7 (115)**	Won by 24	Adelaide Oval (A)	49,735	10th
6	Sun	10 May	4:10	West Coast	**10.8 (68)**	11.12 (78)	Lost by 10	Adelaide Oval	38,508	10th
7	Sun	17 May	4:40	Brisbane Lions	15.12 (102)	**8.17 (65)**	Lost by 37	Gabba	15,957	12th
8	Sun	24 May	4:10	Richmond	**5.13 (43)**	11.10 (76)	Lost by 33	Adelaide Oval	45,268	13th
9	Sat	30 May	1:40	Melbourne	8.6 (54)	**18.7 (115)**	Won by 61	Traegar Park	4,866	11th
10	Sat	6 June	7:10	Western Bulldogs	**16.4 (100)**	9.8 (62)	Won by 38	Adelaide Oval	41,813	9th
11	Fri	12 June	7:20	Geelong	**11.3 (69)**	13.8 (92)	Lost by 23	Adelaide Oval	47,058	10th
12	Sat	20 June	1:40	Carlton	17.8 (110)	**16.10 (106)**	Lost by 4	MCG	27,693	12th
13	Bye									
14	Thu	2 July	7:20	Sydney	14.10 (94)	**12.12 (84)**	Lost by 10	SCG	28,316	12th
15	Thu	9 July	7:20	Collingwood	**9.12 (66)**	9.9 (63)	Won by 3	Adelaide Oval	45,418	12th
16	Sun	19 July	2:50	Adelaide	**17.11 (113)**	18.8 (116)	Lost by 3	Adelaide Oval (H)	54,468	12th
17	Sat	25 July	7:20	Essendon	17.14 (116)	**20.9 (129)**	Won by 13	Docklands	23,705	12th
18	Sun	2 Aug	12:40	St Kilda	**17.10 (112)**	6.13 (49)	Won by 63	Adelaide Oval	36,850	12th
19	Sat	8 Aug	2:10	Western Bulldogs	19.14 (128)	**9.10 (64)**	Lost by 64	Docklands	20,590	12th
20	Sat	15 Aug	4:05	Greater Western Sydney	**16.15 (111)**	13.12 (90)	Won by 21	Adelaide Oval	33,281	12th
21	Fri	21 Aug	7:50	Hawthorn	13.8 (86)	**16.12 (108)**	Won by 22	Docklands	28,657	10th
22	Sat	29 Aug	7:20	Gold Coast	7.9 (51)	**12.16 (88)**	Won by 37	Carrara	9,343	9th
23	Sat	5 Sep	3:20	Fremantle	**18.14 (122)**	8.5 (53)	Won by 69	Adelaide Oval	38,633	9th

== Ladder ==
2015 AFL ladder
Pos	Team	Pld	W	L	D	PF	PA	PP	Pts	
1	Fremantle	22	17	5	0	1857	1564	118.7	68	Finals series
2	West Coast	22	16	5	1	2330	1572	148.2	66	Finals series
3	Hawthorn (P)	22	16	6	0	2452	1548	158.4	64	Finals series
4	Sydney	22	16	6	0	2006	1578	127.1	64	Finals series
5	Richmond	22	15	7	0	1930	1568	123.1	60	Finals series
6	Western Bulldogs	22	14	8	0	2101	1825	115.1	56	Finals series
7	Adelaide	21	13	8	0	2107	1821	115.7	54 (Note: The round 14 match between Adelaide and Geelong was cancelled due to the death of Adelaide coach Phil Walsh, and both teams were awarded two premiership points each.)	Finals series
8	North Melbourne	22	13	9	0	2062	1937	106.5	52	Finals series
9	Port Adelaide	22	12	10	0	2002	1874	106.8	48	
10	Geelong	21	11	9	1	1853	1833	101.1	48	
11	Greater Western Sydney	22	11	11	0	1872	1891	99.0	44	
12	Collingwood	22	10	12	0	1972	1856	106.3	40	
13	Melbourne	22	7	15	0	1573	2044	77.0	28	
14	St Kilda	22	6	15	1	1695	2162	78.4	26	
15	Essendon	22	6	16	0	1580	2134	74.0	24	
16	Gold Coast	22	4	17	1	1633	2240	72.9	18	
17	Brisbane Lions	22	4	18	0	1557	2306	67.5	16	
18	Carlton	22	4	18	0	1525	2354	64.8	16	

Rules for classification: 1) points; 2) percentage; 3) number of points for.
(P) Premiers
