= Brad Moran =

Brad Moran may refer to:

- Brad Moran (ice hockey) (born 1979), Canadian ice hockey player
- Brad Moran (footballer) (born 1986), Australian rules footballer with Adelaide
