= James Sellar (footballer) =

Australian rules footballer (born 1989)

Personal information
- Full name: James Michael Sellar
- Born: 24 March 1989 (age 37); Adelaide, Australia
- Original team: Glenelg (SANFL)
- Draft: 14th overall, 2006; Adelaide
- Height: 196 cm (6 ft 5 in)
- Weight: 98 kg (216 lb)
- Position: Utility

Playing career^{1}
Years	Club	Games (Goals)
2007–2011	Adelaide	21 (3)
2012–2013	Melbourne	23 (11)
Total		44 (14)
- ^{1} Playing statistics correct to the end of 2013.

James Michael Sellar (born 24 March 1989 in Adelaide) is an Australian rules footballer who played with Adelaide and Melbourne in the Australian Football League (AFL).

Sellar was selected in the 2006 AFL draft by the Adelaide Football Club at No. 14 overall, considered a bargain pick at the time considering he was touted as a potential top-5 pick. Sellar was educated at Brighton Secondary School along with other AFL draftees Bryce Gibbs and Mark Austin. At 196 cm and weighing 95 kg, Sellar is a key position forward who can also help out with some ruck duties.

Sellar represented Australia in the International rules football Youth Test between Australia and Ireland, and has also represented Australia in volleyball, in the Under-19 Internationals in Taiwan. He was named best player at the national Under 16 Championships in 2005 and also played in the Under 18 national championships in 2006. He spent most of his early AFL career playing for Glenelg in the South Australian National Football League (SANFL), playing only a handful of games for the Crows despite being named as an emergency on numerous occasions. With injuries to Brad Moran and Jonathon Griffin in mid-2009, Sellar found his way at last into the regular side in the unlikely role of a backup ruckman to Ivan Maric. He scored his first goal in AFL football against Carlton in the last round of the 2009 season. He however struggled in the 2010 season, only playing four games, averaging a mere 6.5 disposals per game.

Sellar was delisted by Adelaide at the end of the 2011 AFL season. In the 2011 AFL draft, Sellar was selected 54th overall by the Melbourne Demons. He played 23 games in two seasons at Melbourne before he was delisted again at the end of the 2013 AFL season.

In 2014, he moved to Western Australia to play for South Fremantle in the West Australian Football League (WAFL).
