= Ryan Murphy (footballer) =

Australian rules footballer

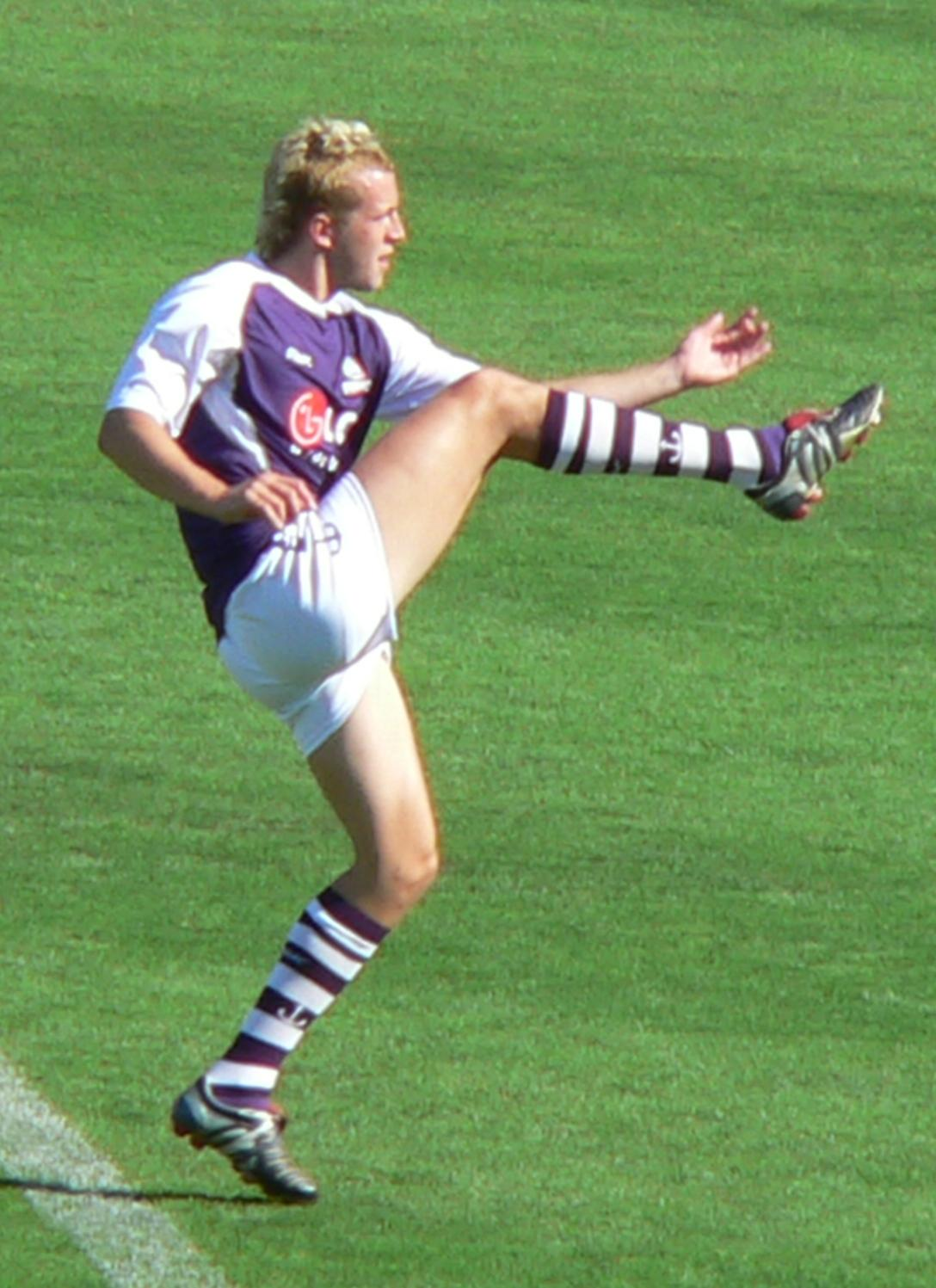

Personal information
- Born: 24 May 1985 (age 41)
- Original team: Gippsland Power (TAC Cup)
- Debut: Round 16, 2004, Fremantle vs. Adelaide, at Football Park
- Height: 193 cm (6 ft 4 in)
- Weight: 92 kg (203 lb)

Playing career^{1}
Years	Club	Games (Goals)
2004–2010	Fremantle	48 (50)
- ^{1} Playing statistics correct to the end of 2010.

Ryan Murphy (born 24 May 1985) is an Australian rules footballer who played forward for the Fremantle Dockers in the Australian Football League.

He was drafted to Fremantle in the 2003 AFL draft at selection 12. As a junior, he played for the Gippsland Power in the Victorian TAC Cup competition and was regarded as an accurate goal kicker. He was twice named All-Australian at under-18 level.

After playing well for the South Fremantle Football Club in the WAFL in 2004, Murphy made his debut in Round 16 against Adelaide in Fremantle's first ever win over Adelaide at Football Park. However he was not given much gametime and ended the match without registering any possessions. He was retained for the following week's game against Sydney, but after again not scoring, he was dropped back to South Fremantle for the remainder of the season. At South he excelled and won the club goalkicking award with 51 goals from 17 matches.

2005 saw Murphy play 10 AFL games for nine goals, but was not able to cement a permanent position in the Fremantle team. He continued to do well for South Fremantle and was a member of their 2005 premiership winning side. In mid-2005 Murphy extended his contract with Fremantle to the end of the 2008 season.

2006 was Ryan's best season in the AFL, scoring 22.8 including a high of 5 goals against Carlton. In the following four seasons he struggled to maintain a position in the side and was often dropped to the WAFL due to poor form. A notable case of this occurred in 2009 when Murphy was dropped a week after kicking Fremantle’s only goal against Adelaide, in the lowest VFL/AFL score since 1961. After only playing one game for Fremantle in 2010 he was delisted at the end of the season. He won the John Gerovich Trophy in 2007 and 2010 for being the South Fremantle's leading goalkicker.
