= Ben Rutten =

Australian rules footballer, born 1983

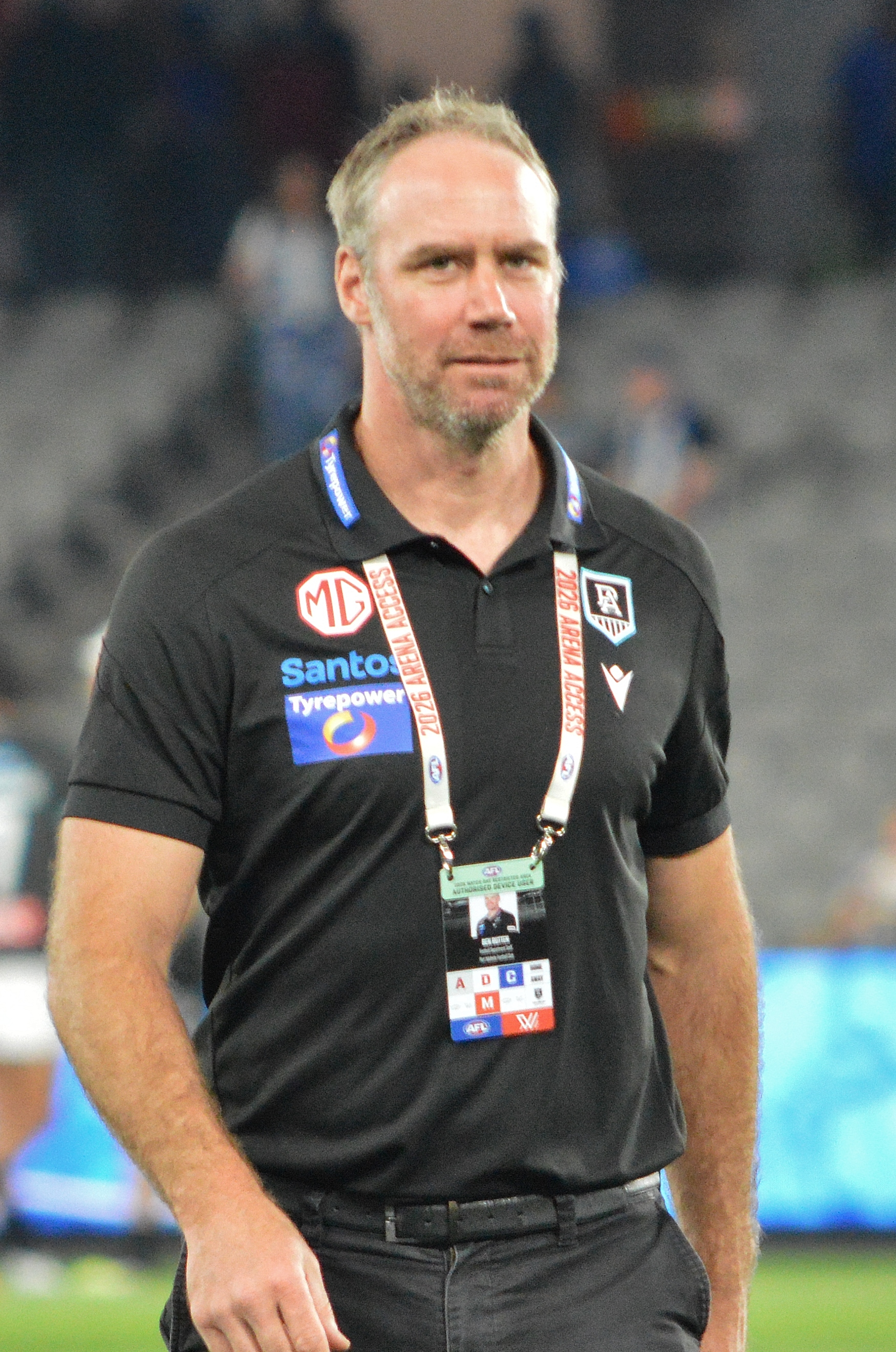
- Rutten as Port Adelaide GM of football in March 2026

Personal information
- Full name: Benjamin Rutten
- Nickname: Truck
- Born: 28 May 1983 (age 43); Adelaide, South Australia
- Original team: West Adelaide (SANFL)
- Draft: No. 40, 2001 rookie draft
- Height: 192 cm (6 ft 4 in)
- Weight: 98 kg (216 lb)
- Position: Defender

Playing career
Years	Club	Games (Goals)
2003–2014	Adelaide	229 (9)

Representative team honours
Years	Team	Games (Goals)
2008	Dream Team	1 (0)

Coaching career^{3}
Years	Club	Games (W–L–D)
2021–2022	Essendon	44 (17–27–0)
- ^{3} Coaching statistics correct as of the 2022 season.

Career highlights
- All-Australian team: 2005

Benjamin Rutten (born 28 May 1983) is a former Australian rules football player and coach. He was the senior coach of the Essendon Football Club in the Australian Football League (AFL) in 2021 and 2022. As a player, he played for the Adelaide Football Club and was known for his size, strength and ability to contain some of the game's best forwards.

== Playing career ==
=== Adelaide ===
Recruited from South Australian National Football League (SANFL) club West Adelaide in the 2001 Rookie Draft, Rutten made his AFL debut in 2003 for Adelaide Crows as a forward, joining an elite club of players who have goaled with each of their first three kicks. Rutten was moved to defence and made a name for himself as a tough full-back, coming of age in the 2005 AFL season, where he was part of Adelaide's sturdy defensive unit, and often held his opponents to two goals or less. This earned Rutten All-Australian selection in 2005, and Rutten became an integral part of Adelaide's defence for the rest of his career. He and fellow All-Australian defender Nathan Bock formed one of the most capable defensive partnerships in the AFL prior to Bock's transfer to the Gold Coast Suns.

On 1 July 2014, Rutten announced that he would retire at the end of the 2014 season, hinting a possible move into coaching. He played his last game against St Kilda on 31 August 2014, scoring his ninth and final AFL goal in the last kick of his career.

== Coaching career ==
=== Richmond ===
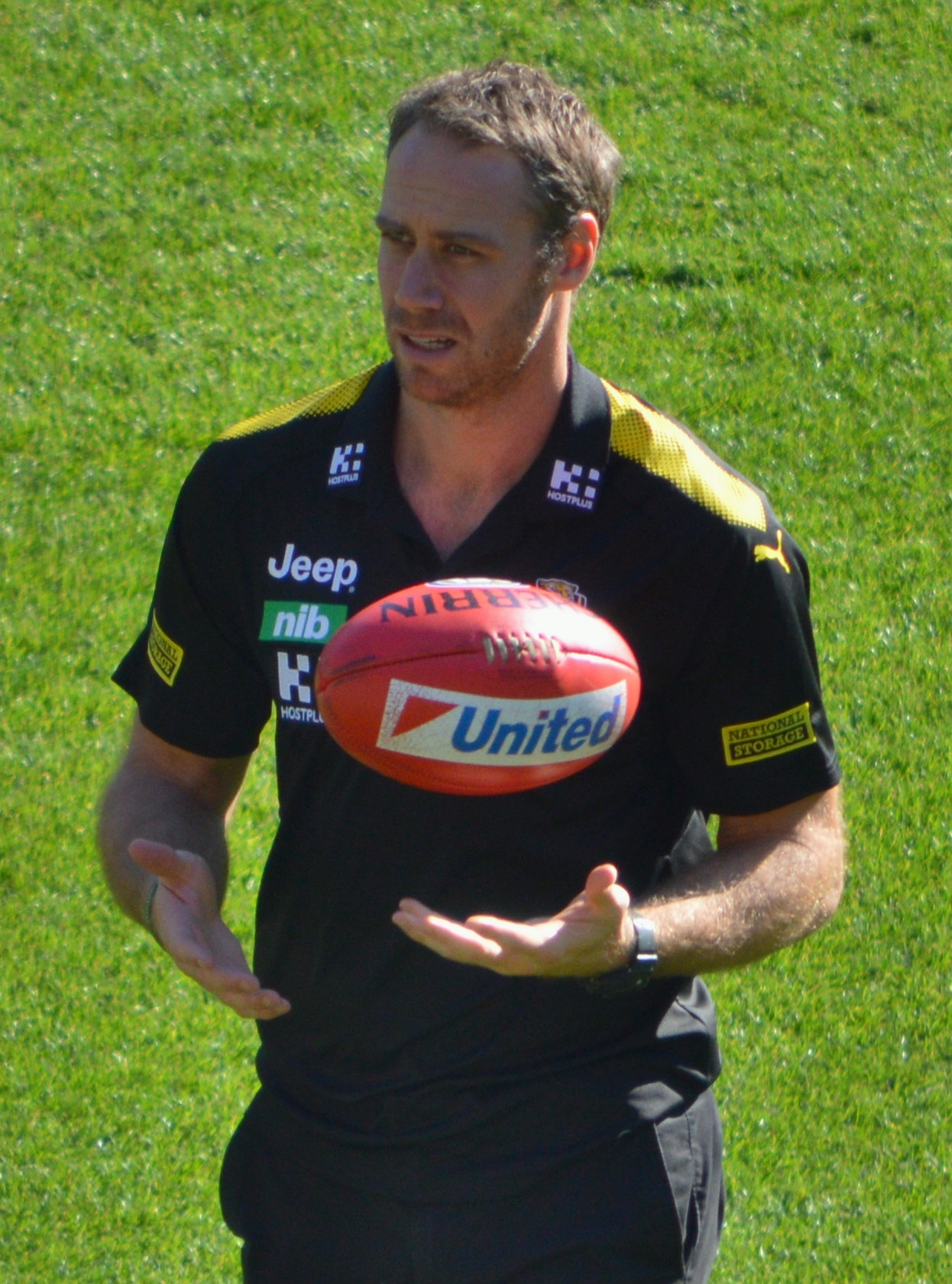
Rutten coaching in May 2018

On 10 September 2014, Rutten became an assistant coach at Richmond under senior coach Damien Hardwick, serving as the club's defence coach. Rutten was also part of the coaching group in the club's 2017 AFL Grand Final win. Rutten left the Richmond Football Club at the end of the 2018 season.

=== Essendon ===
On 24 August 2018, Essendon announced Rutten would be joining their coaching department as an assistant coach under senior coach John Worsfold for the 2019 season, Rutten served as assistant coach in the position of the Team Defence and Key Position Coach. On 17 September 2019, it was announced that Rutten would succeed John Worsfold as the senior coach of Essendon at the conclusion of the 2020 AFL season.

At the end of the 2020 season, Essendon senior coach Worsfold handed over the coaching reins to his assistant coach Rutten as part of the planned transition. Rutten then officially became the senior coach of Essendon Football Club. In Rutten's first season as Essendon Football Club senior coach in the 2021 season, he guided Essendon to finish eighth on the ladder, therefore making the finals. They were eliminated by the eventual runners-up, the Western Bulldogs in an elimination final.

Following an unsuccessful 2022 season in which Essendon under Rutten won seven out of 22 games, David Barham replaced Paul Brasher as Essendon's club president on 15 August and immediately attempted to sign four-time Hawthorn premiership coach Alastair Clarkson, all whilst Rutten was still under contract for 2023. On 19 August, Clarkson instead signed as senior coach of North Melbourne, stating that the Bombers' offer came "far too late" to seriously attract his interest. Several media outlets subsequently described Rutten's position as untenable and expected him to be sacked during that Sunday's board meeting. The next day, Essendon suffered a 66-point round 23 loss to Richmond, with Rutten stating in his post-match press conference that he "deserved better" and that Essendon needed "to come together as a whole football club and stick to a plan." The following day, Rutten was sacked as senior coach of Essendon. Rutten was then replaced by Brad Scott as senior coach of Essendon Football Club.

=== Return to Richmond ===
On 16 September 2022, it was announced that Rutten returned to Richmond as an assistant coach under senior coach Damien Hardwick for the 2023 season. Rutten departed the Richmond Football Club at the end of the 2025 AFL season.

== Administrative Career ==
=== Port Adelaide ===
On 28 October 2025, Rutten was announced as Port Adelaide Football Club new General Manager of Football replacing ex-cricketer Chris Davies.

== Statistics ==
Legend
G	Goals	K	Kicks	D	Disposals	T	Tackles
B	Behinds	H	Handballs	M	Marks

Season	Team	No.	Games	Totals							Averages (per game)						
Season	Team	No.	Games	G	B	K	H	D	M	T	G	B	K	H	D	M	T
2003	Adelaide	25	2	3	0	6	7	13	7	0	1.5	0.0	3.0	3.5	6.5	3.5	0.0
2004	Adelaide	25	9	0	0	55	50	105	40	10	0.0	0.0	6.1	5.6	11.7	4.4	1.1
2005	Adelaide	25	25	1	0	143	137	280	95	27	0.0	0.0	5.7	5.5	11.2	3.8	1.1
2006	Adelaide	25	24	1	2	175	158	333	135	35	0.0	0.1	7.3	6.6	13.9	5.6	1.5
2007	Adelaide	25	20	0	0	122	137	259	113	24	0.0	0.0	6.1	6.9	13.0	5.7	1.2
2008	Adelaide	25	22	0	1	157	182	339	147	20	0.0	0.0	7.1	8.3	15.4	6.7	0.9
2009	Adelaide	25	24	1	0	164	204	368	142	29	0.0	0.0	6.8	8.5	15.3	5.9	1.2
2010	Adelaide	25	22	0	0	128	212	340	128	46	0.0	0.0	5.8	9.6	15.5	5.8	2.1
2011	Adelaide	25	21	0	0	143	174	317	107	30	0.0	0.0	6.8	8.3	15.1	5.1	1.4
2012	Adelaide	25	25	2	1	148	136	284	125	40	0.1	0.0	5.9	5.4	11.4	5.0	1.6
2013	Adelaide	25	21	0	1	140	132	272	114	24	0.0	0.0	6.7	6.3	13.0	5.4	1.1
2014	Adelaide	25	14	1	0	72	80	152	52	24	0.1	0.0	5.1	5.7	10.9	3.7	1.7
Career			229	9	5	1453	1609	3062	1205	309	0.0	0.0	6.3	7.0	13.3	5.3	1.3
