= Justin Schmitt =

Australian rules football field umpire

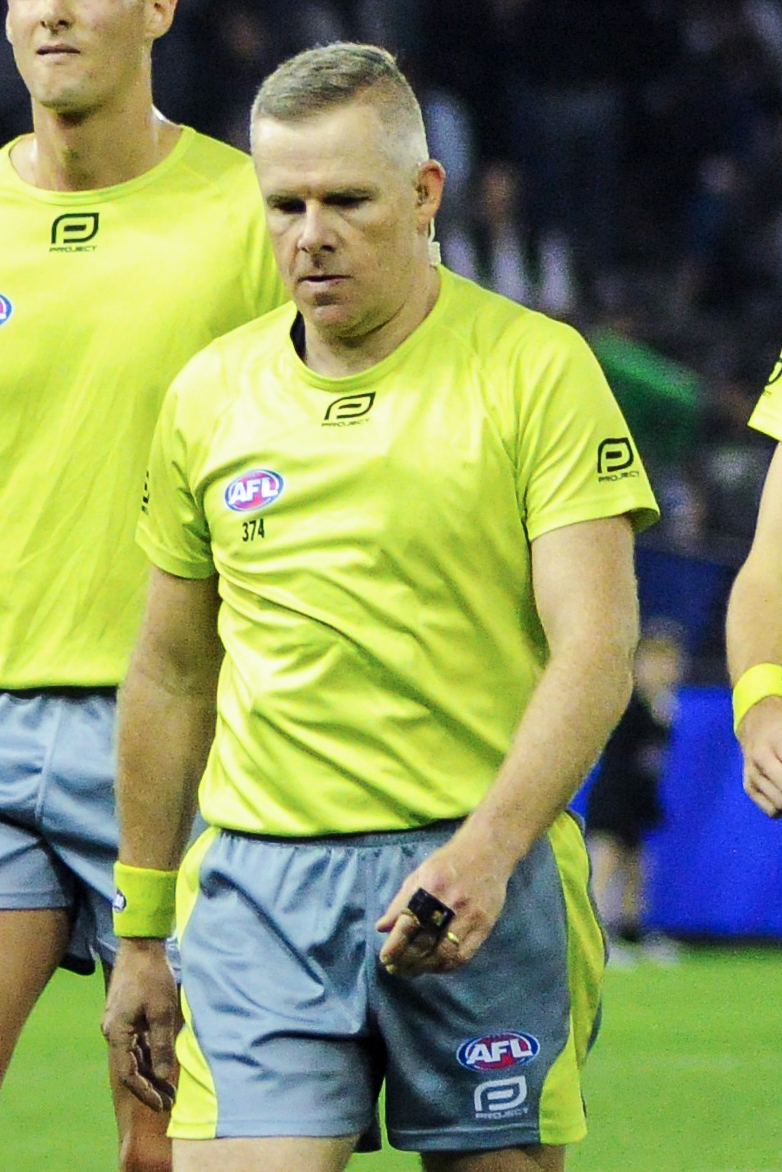
- Schmitt in April 2018

Personal information
- Full name: Justin Schmitt
- Born: 9 October 1974 (age 52)

Umpiring career
Years	League	Role	Games
1997–2018	AFL	Field umpire	363

Justin Schmitt (born 9 October 1974) is a former Australian rules football field umpire who officiated in the Australian Football League. He umpired 363 career games in the AFL, debuting in 1997 and retiring at the end of 2018.
