= Nathan Lovett-Murray =

Australian rules footballer

Personal information
- Full name: Nathan Lovett-Murray
- Born: 18 November 1982 (age 44)
- Draft: No. 33, 2001 Rookie Draft, Collingwood; No. 27 2004 Rookie Draft, Essendon; 2005 Rookie elevation, Essendon
- Height: 190 cm (6 ft 3 in)
- Weight: 87 kg (192 lb)
- Position: Utility

Playing career^{1}
Years	Club	Games (Goals)
2004–2013	Essendon	145 (73)
- ^{1} Playing statistics correct to the end of 2013.

Nathan Lovett-Murray (born 18 November 1982) is a former Australian rules footballer with the Essendon Football Club.

== Early life ==
Lovett-Murray has Indigenous Australian heritage and his tribal ancestry can be traced to the Wamba-Wamba and Gunditjmara.

He began his football in Victoria playing country football with Heywood and the North Ballarat Rebels.

== AFL career ==
Lovett-Murray was initially rookie listed by Collingwood, playing for the Williamstown Seagulls in the Victorian Football League.

After switching to the Bendigo Bombers, he was rookie listed by Essendon in the 2003 Rookie Draft.

Lovett-Murray was promoted to the senior list early in the 2004 season and played 20 games. He spent the 2005 season on the rookie list again, he was promoted again that season and stayed on the senior list since then.

In 2006, Lovett-Murray copped a three-game suspension from the AFL Tribunal for intentionally striking Fremantle midfielder Matthew Carr in the Bombers' round fourteen loss to the Dockers at Subiaco Oval. This was one of many lowlights for the club, which finished 15th at the end of the season with just three wins and one draw from 22 matches played.

Lovett-Murray, along with 33 other Essendon players, was found guilty of using a banned performance-enhancing substance, thymosin beta-4, as part of Essendon's sports supplements program during the 2012 season. He and his team-mates were initially found not guilty in March 2015 by the AFL Anti-Doping Tribunal, but a guilty verdict was returned in January 2016 after an appeal by the World Anti-Doping Agency. He was suspended for two years which, with backdating, ended in December 2016; as a result, he served approximately fifteen months of his suspension and missed the entire 2016 season, when he had intended to play and coach for Rumbalara Football Club.

== Personal life ==
In August 2009, it was reported that Lovett-Murray's home had been raided by police on 3 August. He was charged with possession of a drug of dependency, after the search found a single tablet of ecstasy at his home. However, on 11 December it was reported that the drug charge against him had been dismissed.

On 22 May 2013, he was stabbed in a domestic incident by a girl's boyfriend and hospitalised.

Lovett-Murray belongs to a sporting family and is the great-grandson of pastor Sir Douglas Nicholls, who played for Fitzroy Football Club. In addition, he is the cousin of former Essendon Football Club player Andrew Lovett.

== Statistics ==
Statistics are correct to end of 2012 season.

Legend
G	Goals	K	Kicks	D	Disposals	T	Tackles
B	Behinds	H	Handballs	M	Marks

Season	Team	No.	Games	Totals							Averages (per game)						
Season	Team	No.	Games	G	B	K	H	D	M	T	G	B	K	H	D	M	T
2004	Essendon	42	20	21	11	110	65	175	60	34	1.0	0.6	5.5	3.2	8.8	3.0	1.7
2005	Essendon	42	17	7	4	134	96	230	46	28	0.4	0.2	7.9	5.6	13.5	2.7	1.6
2006	Essendon	42	19	7	10	250	111	361	112	37	0.4	0.5	13.2	5.8	19.0	5.9	2.0
2007	Essendon	42	9	3	1	89	55	144	41	17	0.3	0.1	9.9	6.1	16.0	4.6	1.9
2008	Essendon	42	20	9	5	171	159	331	94	59	0.4	0.2	8.6	8.0	16.6	4.7	3.0
2009	Essendon	42	14	9	4	118	168	266	52	62	0.6	0.3	7.6	11.4	19.0	4.8	3.4
2010	Essendon	42	12	6	2	118	168	286	52	62	0.5	0.2	9.8	14.0	23.8	4.3	5.2
2011	Essendon	42	14	2	2	99	128	227	38	56	0.1	0.1	7.1	9.1	16.2	2.7	4.0
2012	Essendon	42	17	8	7	113	123	236	46	53	0.5	0.4	6.6	7.2	13.9	2.7	3.1
Career			142	72	46	1191	1065	2256	556	394	0.5	0.3	8.4	7.5	15.9	3.9	2.8
