= Nick Gill =

Australian rules footballer and radio presenter

Personal information
- Full name: Nicholas Hunter Gill
- Born: 25 August 1982 (age 44)
- Original team: Oakleigh Chargers
- Draft: 10th overall, 2000 AFL Pre-Season Draft, Melbourne; 55th overall, 2002 AFL Rookie Draft, Kangaroos; 64th overall, 2006 AFL draft, Adelaide
- Height: 192 cm (6 ft 4 in)
- Weight: 90 kg (198 lb)
- Position: Forward

Playing career^{1}
Years	Club	Games (Goals)
2001	Melbourne	0 (0)
2003	Kangaroos	0 (0)
2007–2009	Adelaide	16 (20)
- ^{1} Playing statistics correct to the end of 2008.

Nick Gill (born 25 August 1982) is a former professional Australian rules football player who played for the Adelaide Football Club in the Australian Football League (AFL).

Gill was originally drafted by Melbourne in the 2000 pre-season draft but was delisted at the end of 2001. He then spent 2002 playing with Port Melbourne in the Victorian Football League (VFL) and after a good season was selected by the Kangaroos in the 2003 rookie draft. He was again delisted after only one season and in 2004 moved to the South Australian National Football League (SANFL) to play for the North Adelaide Roosters where he was runner-up in the Magarey Medal in 2005.

== AFL career ==
Gill's 2006 form with North Adelaide Roosters was not the best but impressive results at the South Australian state screening saw him drafted by the Crows with the 64th pick of the 2006 AFL draft. The Crows drafted Gill as a mature-age recruit to act as insurance for the injured Trent Hentschel.

Despite not having the best of starts after being plagued by hamstring injuries at the start of the season, Gill eventually worked his way back into form to be picked for his first game in a forward pocket for the Round 17 clash against the Essendon Football Club in 2007.

In 2008 Gill was in and out of the Adelaide side, becoming a fixture late in the season due to injuries to several key forwards.

Gill struggled with injuries in 2009, and was unable to break into a suddenly potent Adelaide forward line. At the end of the season, he was one of five players delisted by Adelaide.

Gill played for the North Hobart Football Club during the 2013 Tasmanian State League (TSL) season.

== Radio ==
Gill was part of the SAFM breakfast show with Hayley, Rabbit & Cosi as the sports guru in Adelaide. In 2014 he replaced Ali Carle on Triple M Adelaide's Hot Breakfast. Nick currently hosts Hit 106.9 Newcastle's Breakfast Show with Jess Farchione & Ducko. However, Nick will no longer be on the Hit 106.9 network due to a strategic change.
