= James Turner (footballer) =

English footballer

Personal information
- Full name: James Turner
- Date of birth: 20 February 1898
- Place of birth: Swallownest, England
- Date of death: 1979 (aged 83–84)
- Position: Full-back

Senior career*
Years	Team	Apps	(Gls)
1923–1925	Rotherham County	21	(0)
1925–1935	Rotherham United	316	(2)
Total		337	(2)
- * Club domestic league appearances and goals

James Turner (20 February 1898 – 1973) was an English footballer who played in the Football League for Rotherham County and Rotherham United.
