= Craig Hendrie =

Australian rules football field umpire (born 1974)

Craig Robert Hendrie (born 14 July 1974) is an Australian rules football field umpire who umpired between 2003 and 2009 in the Australian Football League.

== Umpiring career ==
=== Junior football ===
Hendrie began umpiring in the North Suburban Junior Football League in Perth, Western Australia in 1988.

=== WAFL ===
Hendrie joined the WAFL umpiring panel in 1995 and made his league football debut in 1996. Hendrie umpired the 2001, 2002 and 2003 WAFL grand finals. To the end of the 2008 WAFL season he had umpired 208 WAFL matches.

=== AFL ===
Hendrie joined the AFL umpiring panel in 2003. To the end of the 2009 AFL season he had umpired 69 AFL games.

In October 2009 it was announced that he would not have an AFL contract for 2010.
