= Brad Moran (footballer) =

Australian rules footballer, born 1986

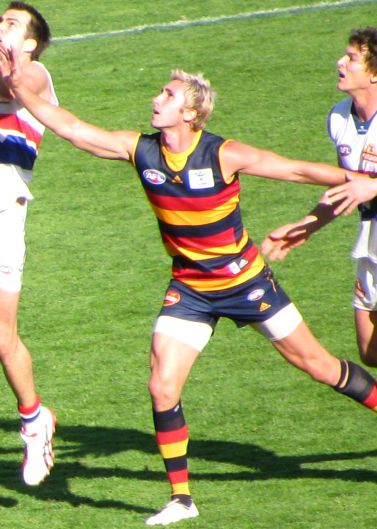

Personal information
- Full name: Bradley Moran
- Born: 29 September 1986 (age 40); Solihull, England
- Original team: Southport Sharks/Surfers Paradise Demons
- Draft: 58th overall, 2004 National draft
- Height: 2.01 m (6 ft 7 in)
- Weight: 100 kg (15 st 10 lb)
- Position: Ruckman

Playing career^{1}
Years	Club	Games (Goals)
2006–2007	North Melbourne	3 (0)
2008–2011	Adelaide	18 (8)
Total		21 (8)
- ^{1} Playing statistics correct to the end of 2011.

Career highlights
- AFL Rising Star nominee 2006

Bradley Moran (born 29 September 1986 in England) is a former Australian rules footballer who played for the North Melbourne Football Club and Adelaide Football Club in the Australian Football League (AFL). Since his retirement from the AFL in 2011, Moran has worked in business and founded two startup technology companies: NoQ in 2011 and CitrusAd in 2017. CitrusAd was acquired in July 2021 by French company Publicis for a reported $205 million.

== Early life ==
Born in Solihull in the West Midlands of England to English parents, Moran's father Martyn was a former junior soccer player. Moran grew up in Stratford-upon-Avon with dreams of becoming a soccer player. As a youth, he represented West Midlands county in rugby union, and was a representative soccer player.

Moran moved to Australia with his family as a 15-year-old, looking to pursue a career in rugby. A friend encouraged him to try Australian rules football with the Surfers Paradise AFC juniors, where he was mentored by former Brisbane Bears captain Roger Merrett and quickly showed talent in the ruck. As his high school The Southport School (TSS) did not encourage Australian Football, Moran continued playing AFL club-level football while playing basketball and rowing at school. Moran became an elite schoolboy rower for TSS when his team won the Queensland State title which qualified it to compete at the 2003 National Championships in the open division at the age of 16.

Although breaking his wrist prior to the Under 18 national championships set back his national AFL entry, Moran was recruited from the Southport Sharks by the Kangaroos Football Club during the 2004 AFL draft.

== AFL career ==
Wearing the number 18 guernsey, previously worn by Wayne Carey, Moran made his AFL debut in 2006 against Hawthorn at Aurora Stadium, playing an effective game with 21 disposals, 10 marks and 10 hitouts, which earned him a nomination for the AFL Rising Star Award.

Moran was traded to the Adelaide Football Club at the end of the 2007 Premiership season, where he took up the number 2 guernsey, also previously worn by Carey during his brief stint at the Crows. After early season injuries in 2008, Moran played his first game for the Crows in round 16 and impressed as a tall defender and ruckman. In round 18, Moran was moved into the forward line against Carlton to cover the loss of Jason Porplyzia where he booted four goals to help the Crows to an eight-point victory.

In 2009, Moran became a regular in the Adelaide side, forming a ruck combination with Ivan Maric. However, midway through the season he injured his knee, which kept him out for the remainder of the season. Moran announced his retirement on 31 August 2011 after ongoing injuries.

== Business career ==
After retiring from the Adelaide Crows, Moran launched a startup technology business called NoQ (pronounced "no queue"), which offered a smartphone application that allowed its users to avoid queues by pre-ordering and paying for food and drinks such as coffee. During the next five years, Moran successfully raised capital for NoQ from investors including Bendigo & Adelaide Bank and secured clients such as Westfield Group and Noodle Box. He left the business in 2016.

In March 2017, Moran and former NoQ colleague Nick Paech launched an advertising technology start-up called CitrusAd, based in Brisbane. Using AI technology, the CitrusAd system enabled retailers to analyze extensive shopper data, ensuring that their websites and apps could provide personalized offers to customers. CitrusAd was marketed as an easy-to-use, self-service, white-label platform tailored for individual retailers aiming to compete with Amazon in the sponsored product market.

In August 2018, CitrusAd stated that 14 AU retailers including Dan Murphy’s were already using its platform. By June of 2019, CitrusAd announced it had signed Coles Group, Ocado, Techdata, Woolworths and the company’s first U.S.retailer, Hy-Vee.

In June 2020, MA Financial Group (part of Moelis & Company) announced an investment of AU6.5 million in CitrusAd, funding the company’s international growth. That month, Moran announced CitrusAd had signed international clients including Groupon in the U.S. and Sainsbury's in the UK.

In July 2021, French company Publicis Groupe announced it had acquired CitrusAd for an undisclosed amount. In October 2021, the Australian Financial Review reported that Publicis had paid AU$205 million for CitrusAd. Moran continues to hold a senior executive role at CitrusAd under its new owner.

=== Awards and recognitions ===
- In October 2023, Moran was listed at place #66 on the Australia’s Young Rich List, published by the Australian Financial Review .
- In December 2021, Moran won the Digital Disruptor award in the 2021 Australian Young Entrepreneur Awards.
- Moran also won the Digital Disruptor award in the 2020 Australian Young Entrepreneur Awards.
- 2019 Pearcey Queensland Entrepreneur Award Finalist.
- Top 20 under 40 Young Business Stars.
- Named as one of the Top 100 Digital Entrepreneurs in Australia.
