= Jason Porplyzia =

Australian rules footballer, born 1984

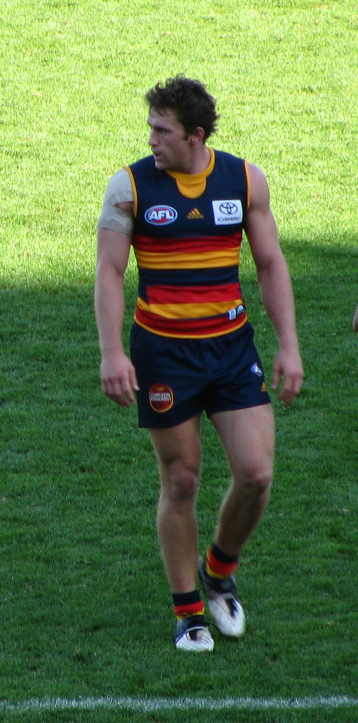

Personal information
- Full name: Jason Porplyzia
- Nickname: Porpoise
- Born: 27 November 1984 (age 41); Adelaide, South Australia
- Original team: West Adelaide (SANFL)
- Draft: 2003 AFL Rookie Draft (Delisted 2004); 9th overall, 2006 Pre-Season Draft; Adelaide
- Height: 177 cm (5 ft 10 in)
- Weight: 80 kg (12 st 8 lb; 176 lb)
- Position: Forward

Playing career
Years	Club	Games (Goals)
2006–2014	Adelaide	130 (181)

Career highlights
- Adelaide leading goalkicker (2009)

Jason Porplyzia (born 27 November 1984 in Adelaide, South Australia) is a former Australian rules football player with a Ukrainian background in the Australian Football League. He wore the number 40 for the Adelaide Football Club, and was known as a dangerous forward with a strong mark for his size. He was also widely regarded as one of the most accurate kicks for goal in the competition. He was known by a number of nicknames, including "the Porpoise", Needles and Porps.

== Early life ==
Porplyzia graduated from Sacred Heart College in 2002 where he regularly played in the First XVIII, and played an integral role in Sacred Heart College's 20 goal defeat of Assumption College, Kilmore as part of the annual intercollegiate exchange. He was drafted by the Adelaide Crows and placed on their rookie list in 2003 but failed to impress the selectors enough to warrant elevation and was subsequently delisted. He then returned to the SANFL with West Adelaide, where he showed outstanding improvement, winning the club Best & Fairest award at the end of 2005. Adelaide rewarded his hard work by reclaiming him in the 2006 pre-season draft.

== AFL career ==
Porplyzia made his AFL debut in round 5, 2006 against the Western Bulldogs, in which he scored 3 goals in Adelaide's resounding victory. Porplyzia played 11 games for the season, the standout being a 25-possession effort against Melbourne in Round 22. He continued to impress in 2007 before finally beginning to make a name for himself as a small forward in 2008, where he repeatedly played through a recurring shoulder injury to almost single-handedly carry Adelaide into the finals in the absence of Brett Burton, and almost into the top four.

2009 was a breakthrough year for Porplyzia, he kicked 57 goals, 20 behinds making him Adelaide's leading goalscorer. He was favourite behind Mark LeCras to receive his first All Australian selection as the small forward pocket, but was controversially beaten by Leon Davis. Porplyzia is recognised as one of the most accurate set shots in the AFL, kicking 16 goals without a miss during 2009. He played his 50th match for the Crows in round 6 against Port Adelaide in Showdown XXIV, and booted three goals despite the Crows' loss. In the Crows round 21 match against the West Coast Eagles, Porplyzia booted his 100th goal in AFL footy, and also achieved a career high 6 goals. On 2 October Porplyzia was officially recognised for being Adelaide's leading goalscorer at the Best and Fairest awards. He also won the coaches award and finished runner up to Bernie Vince in the Best and Fairest by 2 votes.

In 2011 he injured his shoulder in the opening minutes of the first game and missed the rest of the season as he had a second shoulder reconstruction and focused on rehabilitation and strengthening.

He returned to play 22 games in 2012, including his 100th game in round 14 against Richmond, in which he kicked his 150th career goal.

Porplyzia retired from the AFL at the end of the 2014 season with a total of 130 games played in 10 seasons He then returned to West Adelaide in the SANFL in 2015 where he has helped the Bloods into the 2015 SANFL Grand Final and was named by coach Mark Mickan (himself a former West Adelaide and Crows club champion) to play on the half-back flank in the game at the Adelaide Oval.

== Statistics ==
Legend
G	Goals	K	Kicks	D	Disposals	T	Tackles
B	Behinds	H	Handballs	M	Marks

Season	Team	No.	Games	Totals							Averages (per game)						
Season	Team	No.	Games	G	B	K	H	D	M	T	G	B	K	H	D	M	T
2006	Adelaide	40	11	10	11	76	49	125	44	27	0.9	1.0	6.9	4.5	11.4	4.0	2.5
2007	Adelaide	40	15	15	10	105	100	205	56	36	1.0	0.7	7.0	6.7	13.7	3.7	2.4
2008	Adelaide	40	18	32	15	186	111	297	77	48	1.8	0.8	10.3	6.2	16.5	4.3	2.7
2009	Adelaide	40	24	57	20	206	138	344	89	88	2.4	0.8	8.6	5.8	14.3	3.7	3.7
2010	Adelaide	40	19	22	17	159	122	281	71	59	1.2	0.9	8.4	6.4	14.8	3.7	3.1
2011	Adelaide	40	1	1	0	1	0	1	1	1	1.0	0.0	1.0	0.0	1.0	1.0	1.0
2012	Adelaide	40	22	30	13	257	138	395	103	60	1.4	0.6	11.7	6.3	18.0	4.7	2.7
2013	Adelaide	40	16	13	14	126	98	224	54	31	0.8	0.9	7.9	6.1	14.0	3.4	1.9
2014	Adelaide	40	4	1	0	21	12	33	8	6	0.3	0.0	5.3	3.0	8.3	2.0	1.5
Career			130	181	100	1137	768	1905	503	356	1.4	0.8	8.7	5.9	14.7	3.9	2.7
