= Tyson Edwards =

Australian rules footballer

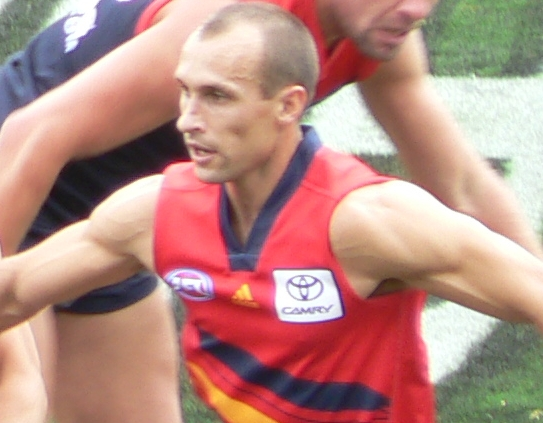

Personal information
- Full name: Tyson Edwards
- Born: 6 August 1976 (age 50); Adelaide, Australia
- Original team: West Adelaide (SANFL)
- Draft: 21st overall, 1994 Pre-Season draft Adelaide
- Height: 178 cm (5 ft 10 in)
- Weight: 81 kg (179 lb)
- Position: Midfielder

Playing career^{1}
| Years | Club | Games (Goals) |
| 1995–2010 | Adelaide | 321 (192) |

International team honours
| Years | Team | Games (Goals) |
| 2002 | Australia | 2 (?) |
- ^{1} Playing statistics correct to the end of 2010.

Career highlights
- 2× AFL premiership player (1997, 1998); Showdown Medal: Round 6, 2006; Adelaide Football Club Hall Of Fame; Merv Agars Medal: 2008

Tyson Edwards (born 6 August 1976) is a former Australian rules footballer with the Adelaide Football Club in the Australian Football League (AFL). Raised in the small Mallee town of Wynarka, around 120 km from Adelaide, he is widely regarded as one of the most consistent and durable players to have played the game.

Between the ages of 11 and 15, Edwards' mother Jan would drive him the 250 km round trip to Adelaide at least twice a week so that he could train with West Adelaide's junior teams.

Recruited from West Adelaide in the SANFL, Edwards made his AFL debut in 1995 and subsequently established himself as one of the AFL's most consistent and underrated midfielders.

In 2008, he placed fourth in the Crows Club Champion voting, with 137 votes, again highlighting his consistency within the playing group.

Edwards played his 300th game for the Adelaide Crows against Essendon in Round 11, 2009. The Crows won the match 21.4 (130) – 18.6 (114), and Edwards celebrated by gathering an equal-career-best 41 possessions. Four games later, he and dual-premiership teammate Andrew McLeod played their 290th match together, setting a new VFL/AFL record in the process; they extended this record to 307 games, which they held until broken by Collingwood duo Sidebottom and Pendlebury, in round 2 of the 2025 AFL season.

On 27 May 2010, Edwards announced his retirement from the AFL, effective immediately, after being dropped from the Adelaide side. Coach Neil Craig later agreed to allow Edwards a farewell game, his 321st, the next week against Fremantle in Adelaide. The decision worked wonders, with the Crows upsetting the second-placed Dockers by 23 points, with Edwards again celebrating his milestone with a best-on-ground effort featuring 32 possessions and two goals.

On 19 March 2011, Edwards revealed he had battled testicular cancer in his final year at the Adelaide Crows, in what he described as his "year from hell".

Edwards was an assistant coach at the Port Adelaide Football Club from seasons 2012 to 2015.

== Personal life ==
He is married to Mandy with three sons: Jackson, Luke, and Brodie.

Jackson was drafted as a father–son selection in the 2017 Rookie draft but was delisted after one season without playing a match, while Luke was drafted by the West Coast Eagles as the 52nd pick in the 2020 AFL draft.

He is currently the coach of River Murray Football League (RMFL) team Tailem Bend where his son Brodie has played his football for a number of years.

== Playing statistics ==
Legend
| G | Goals | K | Kicks | D | Disposals | T | Tackles |
| B | Behinds | H | Handballs | M | Marks |

| Season | Team | No. | Games | Totals | | | | | | | Averages (per game) | | | | | | |
| Season | Team | No. | Games | G | B | K | H | D | M | T | G | B | K | H | D | M | T |
|---|---|---|---|---|---|---|---|---|---|---|---|---|---|---|---|---|---|
| 1995 | Adelaide | 37 | 12 | 2 | 2 | 82 | 69 | 151 | 26 | 8 | 0.2 | 0.2 | 6.8 | 5.8 | 12.6 | 2.2 | 0.7 |
| 1996 | Adelaide | 37 | 17 | 7 | 3 | 94 | 61 | 155 | 41 | 26 | 0.4 | 0.2 | 5.5 | 3.6 | 9.1 | 2.4 | 1.5 |
| 1997 | Adelaide | 9 | 17 | 5 | 3 | 108 | 69 | 177 | 57 | 34 | 0.3 | 0.2 | 6.4 | 4.1 | 10.4 | 3.4 | 2.0 |
| 1998 | Adelaide | 9 | 15 | 11 | 1 | 93 | 52 | 145 | 42 | 13 | 0.7 | 0.1 | 6.2 | 3.5 | 9.7 | 2.8 | 0.9 |
| 1999 | Adelaide | 9 | 20 | 20 | 5 | 144 | 85 | 229 | 72 | 31 | 1.0 | 0.3 | 7.2 | 4.3 | 11.5 | 3.6 | 1.6 |
| 2000 | Adelaide | 9 | 22 | 14 | 12 | 313 | 122 | 435 | 114 | 47 | 0.6 | 0.5 | 14.2 | 5.5 | 19.8 | 5.2 | 2.1 |
| 2001 | Adelaide | 9 | 23 | 12 | 16 | 322 | 159 | 481 | 102 | 62 | 0.5 | 0.7 | 14.0 | 6.9 | 20.9 | 4.4 | 2.7 |
| 2002 | Adelaide | 9 | 25 | 16 | 7 | 335 | 153 | 488 | 109 | 57 | 0.6 | 0.3 | 13.4 | 6.1 | 19.5 | 4.4 | 2.3 |
| 2003 | Adelaide | 9 | 23 | 19 | 11 | 276 | 163 | 439 | 96 | 49 | 0.8 | 0.5 | 12.0 | 7.1 | 19.1 | 4.2 | 2.1 |
| 2004 | Adelaide | 9 | 22 | 18 | 20 | 303 | 135 | 438 | 108 | 62 | 0.8 | 0.9 | 13.8 | 6.1 | 19.9 | 4.9 | 2.8 |
| 2005 | Adelaide | 9 | 25 | 17 | 3 | 317 | 237 | 554 | 106 | 73 | 0.7 | 0.1 | 12.7 | 9.5 | 22.2 | 4.2 | 2.9 |
| 2006 | Adelaide | 9 | 22 | 15 | 4 | 301 | 241 | 542 | 116 | 79 | 0.7 | 0.2 | 13.7 | 11.0 | 24.6 | 5.3 | 3.6 |
| 2007 | Adelaide | 9 | 23 | 7 | 8 | 348 | 231 | 579 | 132 | 94 | 0.3 | 0.3 | 15.1 | 10.0 | 25.2 | 5.7 | 4.1 |
| 2008 | Adelaide | 9 | 23 | 19 | 15 | 306 | 195 | 501 | 140 | 71 | 0.8 | 0.7 | 13.3 | 8.5 | 21.8 | 6.1 | 3.1 |
| 2009 | Adelaide | 9 | 22 | 8 | 12 | 289 | 265 | 554 | 125 | 86 | 0.4 | 0.5 | 13.1 | 12.0 | 25.2 | 5.7 | 3.9 |
| 2010 | Adelaide | 9 | 10 | 2 | 3 | 127 | 99 | 226 | 55 | 38 | 0.2 | 0.3 | 12.7 | 9.9 | 22.6 | 5.5 | 3.8 |
| Career | | | 321 | 192 | 125 | 3758 | 2336 | 6094 | 1441 | 830 | 0.6 | 0.4 | 11.7 | 7.3 | 19.0 | 4.5 | 2.6 |
