= Jarrhan Jacky =

Australian rules football player (born 1989)

Personal information
- Full name: Jarrhan Jacky
- Born: 5 April 1989 (age 37)
- Original team: Subiaco (WAFL)
- Draft: 30th overall, 2007; Adelaide
- Height: 177 cm (5 ft 10 in)
- Weight: 76 kg (168 lb)
- Position: Midfielder

Playing career^{1}
Years	Club	Games (Goals)
2008–2010	Adelaide	3 (1)
- ^{1} Playing statistics correct to the end of 2010.

Jarrhan Jacky is a former professional Australian rules football player who played for the Adelaide Crows in the Australian Football League (AFL).

Recruited from Western Australian Football League (WAFL) club Subiaco at the 2007 AFL draft, Jacky made his AFL debut against Fremantle in round five 2008, kicked his first AFL goal in his second game, against North Melbourne.

When not picked by Adelaide, Jacky played with South Australian Football League (SANFL) club Woodville-West Torrens.
