= Angus Monfries =

Australian rules footballer, born 1987

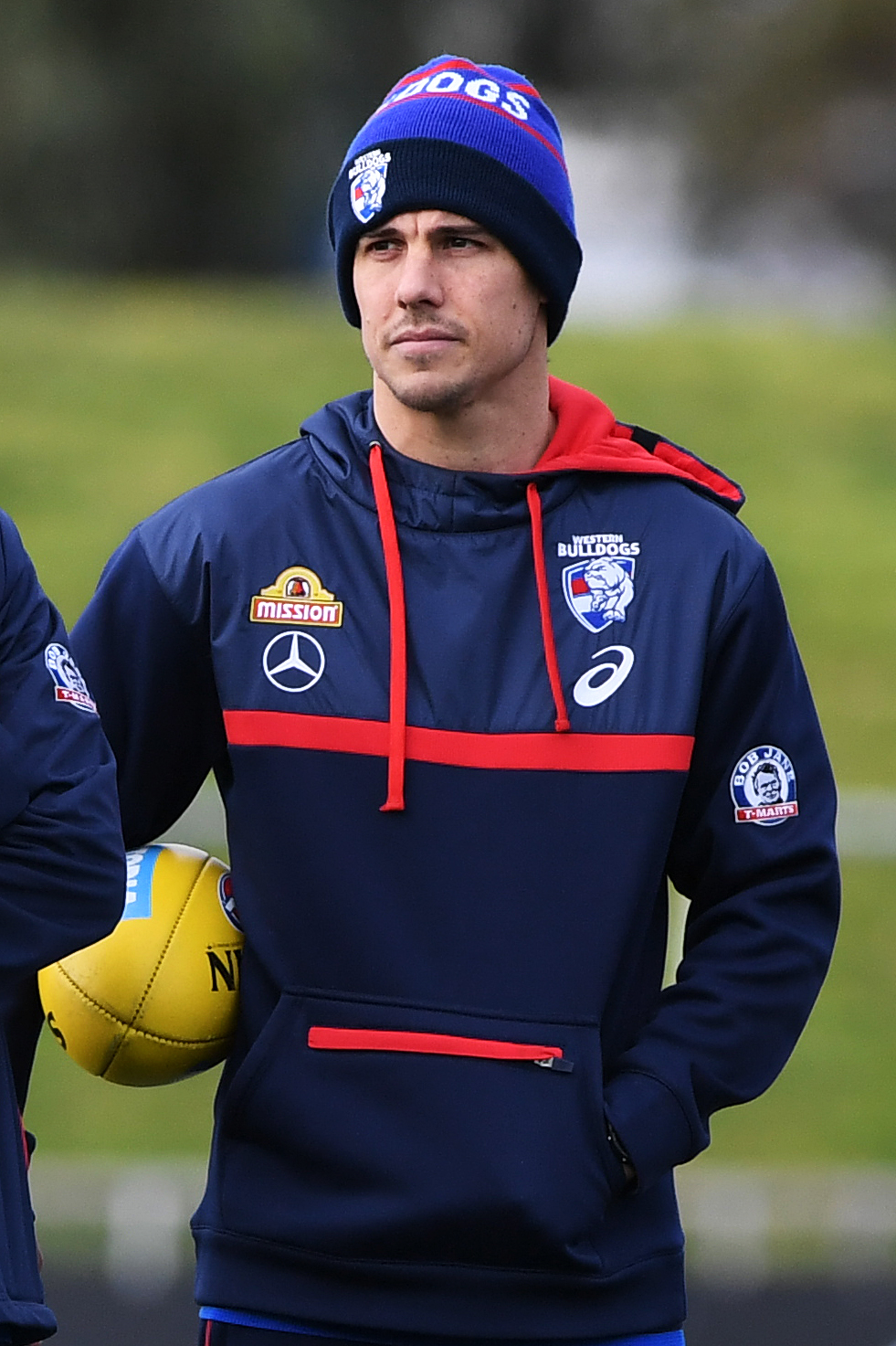
- Monfries in August 2018

Personal information
- Full name: Angus Grey Monfries
- Born: 19 January 1987 (age 39)
- Original team: Sturt (SANFL)
- Draft: No. 14, 2004 National Draft, Essendon
- Height: 184 cm (6 ft 0 in)
- Weight: 78 kg (172 lb)
- Position: Forward

Playing career^{1}
Years	Club	Games (Goals)
2005–2012	Essendon	150 (165)
2013–2017	Port Adelaide	61 (83)
Total		211 (248)

International team honours^{2}
Years	Team	Games (Goals)
2011	Australia	2 (0)
- ^{1} Playing statistics correct to the end of 2017.^{2} Representative statistics correct as of 2011.

Career highlights
- Essendon leading goalkicker 2010

Angus Monfries (born 19 January 1987) is a former professional Australian rules footballer who played for the Essendon Football Club and Port Adelaide Football Club in the Australian Football League (AFL). Monfries played as a forward pocket or half forward.

== AFL career ==
Monfries was drafted by the Bombers with selection 14 in the 2004 AFL draft. He played football for Walkerville Junior Football Club before moving to Melbourne. He made his debut in Round 1, 2005 against Melbourne, which saw him become the 200th player to have played under coach Kevin Sheedy. Monfries maintained his position in the senior side until round 4, but was dropped for the Anzac Day clash in round 5, against Collingwood and did not play at senior level again until round 12. In round 13 against St Kilda, he kicked two goals and, alongside other young Bombers, played a role in a fifteen-point win. He then went on to play every game for the remainder of the season. In 2006, his second season, Monfries played 21 games, missing only one game due to a minor calf strain.

In 2007, Monfries played 20 out of 22 games, omitted on form for two weeks at midseason. He was, however, named as an emergency for both matches and quickly returned to the team due to pressures caused by injuries and suspensions to other key players.

In 2009, Monfries became a key player within the Essendon Football Club. He defined his role further as a key position forward and finished second in the club's goalkicking after Matthew Lloyd.

On 5 October 2012, Angus told Essendon that he will be leaving and be signing a new four-year deal with Port Adelaide. On 8 October 2012, Essendon announced that Monfries would be traded to Port Adelaide for pick 48. He made his debut for Port Adelaide in round 1, 2013, against Melbourne. In round 20, 2013, Monfries kicked a career best seven goals in Port Adelaide's loss to Geelong.

Monfries, along with 33 other past and present Essendon players, was found guilty of using a banned performance-enhancing substance, thymosin beta-4, as part of Essendon's sports supplements program during the 2012 season. He and his teammates were initially found not guilty in March 2015 by the AFL Anti-Doping Tribunal, but a guilty verdict was returned in January 2016 after an appeal by the World Anti-Doping Agency. He was suspended for two years which, with backdating, ended in November 2016; as a result, he served approximately fourteen months of his suspension and missed the entire 2016 AFL season.

At the conclusion of the 2017 season, he announced his retirement from AFL football.

== Statistics ==
Statistics are correct to the end of the 2012 season.

Season	Team	No.	Games	Totals							Averages (per game)						
Season	Team	No.	Games	G	B	K	H	D	M	T	G	B	K	H	D	M	T
2005	Essendon	6	12	11	7	59	58	117	31	21	0.9	0.6	4.9	4.8	9.8	2.6	1.8
2006	Essendon	6	21	22	11	174	125	299	99	47	1.0	0.5	8.3	6.0	14.2	4.7	2.2
2007	Essendon	6	20	16	12	180	115	295	92	49	0.8	0.6	9.0	5.8	14.8	4.6	2.4
2008	Essendon	6	19	18	10	175	134	309	96	47	1.0	0.5	9.2	7.0	16.3	5.0	2.5
2009	Essendon	6	21	25	15	168	162	330	116	51	1.2	0.7	8.0	7.7	15.7	5.5	2.4
2010	Essendon	6	17	24	10	134	130	264	71	46	1.4	0.6	7.9	7.6	15.5	4.2	2.7
2011	Essendon	6	22	31	12	186	207	393	96	90	1.4	0.6	8.4	9.4	17.9	4.4	4.1
2012	Essendon	6	18	18	15	145	126	271	71	52	1.0	0.8	8.1	7.0	15.1	3.9	2.9
Career			150	165	92	1221	1057	2278	672	403	1.1	0.6	8.1	7.0	15.2	4.5	2.7

Legend
G	Goals	K	Kicks	D	Disposals	T	Tackles
B	Behinds	H	Handballs	M	Marks
