= Michael Doughty (Australian footballer) =

Australian rules footballer, born 1979

Personal information
- Full name: Michael Doughty
- Nicknames: Dogger, Dogs
- Born: 5 August 1979 (age 47); Adelaide, Australia
- Original team: South Adelaide (SANFL)
- Draft: 4th overall, 1999 Rookie Draft (Elevated 2000); Adelaide
- Height: 178 cm (5 ft 10 in)
- Weight: 78 kg (172 lb)
- Position: Midfield / Defence

Playing career^{1}
Years	Club	Games (Goals)
2000–2012	Adelaide	231 (46)
- ^{1} Playing statistics correct to the end of 2012.

Michael Doughty (born 5 August 1979) is a former Australian rules footballer who played for the Adelaide Football Club in the Australian Football League (AFL) between 2000 and 2012. He is now playing for Reynella Football Club in the Southern Football League, where he played junior football.

Originally from South Adelaide Football Club in the South Australian National Football League (SANFL), Doughty was drafted by Adelaide with their first choice (fourth overall) at the 1999 Rookie Draft and elevated to Adelaide's senior list in 2000 when he made his senior AFL debut.

Known as a solid utility player, Doughty has most often used as a midfielder, tagger or a small defender. Doughty played his 150th game in round 8, 2009 and his 200th game in Round 15, 2011. Adelaide defeated Sydney by seven points to end a record-equalling six-match losing streak in this match. He retired at the end of the 2012 season, having played in 24 of Adelaide's 25 matches, only missing one game when his wife Sara gave birth to his son, Max. He joined sports management company Elite Sports Properties as a player manager after retiring as a player.

== Statistics ==
Statistics are correct to end of AFL career

Season	Team	No.	Games	Totals							Averages (per game)						
Season	Team	No.	Games	G	B	K	H	D	M	T	G	B	K	H	D	M	T
2000	Adelaide	41	2	0	1	3	4	7	1	1	0.0	0.5	1.5	2.0	3.5	0.5	0.5
2001	Adelaide	11	3	0	0	11	4	15	6	2	0.0	0.0	3.7	1.3	5.0	2.0	0.7
2002	Adelaide	11	25	13	5	220	161	381	95	39	0.5	0.2	8.8	6.4	15.2	3.8	1.6
2003	Adelaide	11	6	3	3	46	30	76	23	11	0.5	0.5	7.7	5.0	12.7	3.8	1.8
2004	Adelaide	11	17	4	5	117	114	231	70	55	0.2	0.3	6.9	6.7	13.6	4.1	3.2
2005	Adelaide	11	24	1	5	129	176	305	90	52	0.0	0.2	5.4	7.3	12.7	3.8	2.2
2006	Adelaide	11	23	8	5	241	235	476	137	69	0.4	0.2	10.5	10.2	20.7	6.0	3.0
2007	Adelaide	11	19	2	2	141	212	353	89	59	0.1	0.1	7.4	11.2	18.6	4.7	3.1
2008	Adelaide	11	23	3	1	239	264	503	134	75	0.1	0.0	10.4	11.5	21.9	5.8	3.3
2009	Adelaide	11	24	8	1	255	266	521	127	89	0.3	0.0	10.6	11.1	21.7	5.3	3.7
2010	Adelaide	11	22	1	1	200	211	411	114	74	0.0	0.0	9.1	9.6	18.7	5.2	3.4
2011	Adelaide	11	19	1	0	172	180	352	87	70	0.0	0.0	9.0	9.5	18.5	4.6	3.7
2012	Adelaide	11	24	2	1	206	167	373	100	74	0.1	0.0	8.6	7.0	15.5	4.2	3.1
Career			231	46	30	1980	2024	4004	1073	670	0.2	0.1	8.6	8.8	17.3	4.6	2.9

Legend
G	Goals	K	Kicks	D	Disposals	T	Tackles
B	Behinds	H	Handballs	M	Marks
