= Brodie Martin =

Australian rules footballer (born 1988)

Personal information
- Full name: Brodie Martin
- Nicknames: Juan, Marto
- Born: 6 November 1988 (age 37); Meningie, South Australia
- Original teams: Meningie; Sturt (SANFL)
- Draft: No. 52, 2007 Rookie Draft, Adelaide; No. 74 (RP), 2009 National Draft, Adelaide
- Debut: Round 16, 2009, Adelaide vs. St Kilda, at Etihad Stadium
- Height: 180 cm (5 ft 11 in)
- Weight: 82 kg (12 st 13 lb; 181 lb)
- Position: Midfielder, small forward

Playing career^{1}
Years	Club	Games (Goals)
2009–2015	Adelaide	38 (14)
- ^{1} Playing statistics correct to the end of 2015.

Brodie Martin (born 6 November 1988) is a former professional Australian rules footballer who played for the Adelaide Football Club in the Australian Football League (AFL). He was drafted to the Crows with selection 52 in the 2007 Rookie Draft.

== AFL career ==
Martin spent two seasons on the rookie list before being elevated to the primary list before round 16, 2009 as a result of a new rule allowing one free upgrade per team to offset concessions being made to the new Gold Coast franchise. He was named as an emergency in the game against St Kilda and after two teammates were withdrawn due to illness, he was selected for his first game. He kicked a goal with his first kick in AFL football and performed well enough to retain his place in the side for the next week. In that game, against Port Adelaide, he seriously injured his left knee while landing awkwardly after a marking contest, and although he played out the match, scans later revealed a rupture to the anterior cruciate ligament in the knee, requiring reconstructive knee surgery and a 10 to 12-month rehabilitation period. He made a successful return late in 2010, playing two games in the SANFL for Sturt and two AFL games, including a 28-possession effort against St Kilda. After the season, retiring captain Simon Goodwin passed his guernsey number, 36, to Martin.

In 2011 Martin struggled for form, playing only five matches for Adelaide, although he showed good signs late in the season for Sturt. He was kept out of the side by persistent hamstring injuries in 2012, playing seven games. He continued to perform for Sturt, with 12 Magarey Medal votes from limited appearances. 2013 was also ruined by injuries, with Martin only playing two games.

Martin had his best season to date in 2014, playing 17 games including the last 15 in a row. He averaged 16 disposals per game, playing on the wing and at half-forward.

He was delisted at the conclusion of the 2015 season.

== Statistics ==
Statistics are correct to end of 2014 season

Legend
G	Goals	K	Kicks	D	Disposals	T	Tackles
B	Behinds	H	Handballs	M	Marks

Season	Team	No.	Games	Totals							Averages (per game)						
Season	Team	No.	Games	G	B	K	H	D	M	T	G	B	K	H	D	M	T
2009	Adelaide	41	2	1	0	19	15	34	13	4	0.5	0.0	9.5	7.5	17.0	6.5	2.0
2010	Adelaide	41	2	0	0	22	19	41	11	7	0.0	0.0	11.0	9.5	20.5	5.5	3.5
2011	Adelaide	36	5	0	0	20	28	48	11	8	0.0	0.0	4.0	5.6	9.6	2.2	1.6
2012	Adelaide	36	7	3	5	66	34	100	21	12	0.4	0.7	9.4	4.9	14.3	3.0	1.7
2013	Adelaide	36	2	0	1	14	4	18	4	2	0.0	0.5	7.0	2.0	9.0	2.0	1.0
2014	Adelaide	36	17	8	15	155	109	264	65	45	0.5	0.9	9.1	6.4	15.5	3.8	2.7
Career			35	12	21	296	209	505	125	78	0.3	0.6	8.5	6.0	14.4	3.6	2.2
