= Brett Burton =

Australian rules footballer, born 1978

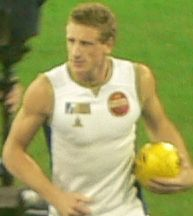

Personal information
- Full name: Brett Burton
- Nickname: Birdman
- Born: 4 May 1978 (age 48); Whyalla, South Australia
- Original team: Woodville-West Torrens (SANFL)
- Draft: No. 16, 1998 national draft
- Height: 185 cm (6 ft 1 in)
- Weight: 83 kg (183 lb)
- Position: Forward

Playing career^{1}
Years	Club	Games (Goals)
1999–2010	Adelaide	177 (264)
- ^{1} Playing statistics correct to the end of 2010.

Career highlights
- 2× Adelaide leading goalkicker: 2002, 2008; AFL Rising Star nominee: 1999; Mark of the Year: 2009

Brett Burton (born 4 May 1978) is a retired Australian rules footballer who played in the Australian Football League. He was picked up at Pick 16 in the 1998 AFL draft by the Adelaide Football Club. He is noted for his spectacular high marking, which saw him win the AFL Mark of the Year in 2009, and freakish goal sense.

== AFL career ==
=== Early career (1999–2000) ===
Brett Burton began his AFL career in 1999 aged 20. He immediately made a difference in the team, playing all games bar one, scoring 25 goals and averaging 19 disposals. He picked up 22 disposals in the game against Geelong in Round 14. The next year he sustained several minor injuries that restricted his season to just nine games, averaging 15 disposals and kicking eight goals.

=== Birdman (2001) ===
He played 14 games in 2001, kicking a goal a game and winning several Mark of the Year nominations. During this time, he was nicknamed the "Birdman" by Mike McLean from Triple M Football, a name that has stuck for the duration of his career.

=== 2002-2006 seasons ===
2002 was a great year for Burton, who played all 25 games. He kicked six goals in a game against the West Coast Eagles, as well as four bags of four, on his way to leading the Crows' goalscoring with 52. He also set up numerous chances for others, averaging 11 disposals per game in a largely forward role. In 2003 Burton's injury woes returned, as he missed out on eight consecutive games early in the season. On his return, however, he continued to dominate, kicking 23 goals from his 16 games and moving up the field to average 21 disposals.

2004 was a poor year for Adelaide, but it was even worse for Burton. He played just 13 games in another injury-cursed year, and he struggled for consistency. Continuing to play up the field, he managed to average 20 disposals per game, but kicked only eight goals. As the Crows flew high in 2005, however, so did Burton; he played 20 games, averaging 20 disposals and kicking 14 goals, having also assisted in the scoring of many others. A return to the forward line in 2006 and the Crows' continued dominance saw Burton kick 27 goals from his first 10 games, before injury damned the rest of his – and Adelaide's – season.

=== Major injuries (2007–2008) ===
In 2007, Burton started the year by injuring his knee in the first game. Due to the Crows' injury-ravaged squad, he continued to play on until round 8, when he finally had minor surgery. On his return the Crows pushed him forward, and he helped the Crows grab on to eighth spot and compete in the finals, but despite a strong showing the Crows could not overcome Hawthorn in the Elimination Final.

For the first time at the club, Burton was able to complete an uninterrupted pre-season in 2008. This paid dividends, with Burton returning to career-best form, playing as a permanent forward and playing every game up until a two-game suspension in round 10. On his return, Burton struggled for form but then produced one of his best ever first-half performances against Collingwood in round 15, kicking four goals to give Adelaide a substantial half-time lead. At this point, however, disaster struck; in the midst of a Collingwood surge early in the third quarter, Burton's left leg jarred in the ground as he attempted to quickly change direction and he had to be taken off the ground on a mobile stretcher; this demoralized the Crows who were soundly beaten. Later that day the club revealed that Burton had torn his ACL and required a full knee reconstruction, which would keep him out of football for 12 months. Despite playing only 12 full games, Burton was the Crows' leading goalkicker for the year with 34. His contract expired at the end of 2008, and there was plenty of speculation as to whether his career was over. However, Adelaide offered him a reduced contract for 2009, which he accepted.

=== 2009 season ===
Burton made a successful return for the Woodville-West Torrens Eagles in the SANFL during round 14 of the 2009 AFL season, kicking four goals, leading to speculation as to whether or not he would be selected for the Crows' next game against Fremantle. He was not, however, and he again played for the Eagles, being a solid contributor despite the team suffering a crushing loss to Sturt. He was returned to the senior side the following week against St Kilda, and, while he had little impact on that game, he shone in the next, kicking four goals against Port Adelaide and cementing his spot as part of a suddenly potent forward line.

Burton continued to show patches of brilliance at times, including the huge mark against Carlton in the last round of the season that saw him finally claim the Mark of the Year. This was intermingled with some lean patches and struggles with injury. Questions were asked over whether his time in the game was over at last; however, he has indicated that he wants to play on.

=== AFL Players Association (2010) ===
In 2010, Burton became president of the AFL Players Association, replacing Joel Bowden. Despite this appointment, his 2010 on field performances declined dramatically, culminating in him not being selected for the Crows round 8 clash with North Melbourne. After a very poor Showdown performance and a quiet game against bottom placed Richmond, he retired at the end of the 2010 season.

== Achievements ==
The following are some of the major achievements by Brett Burton.

- President of the AFL Players Association (2010)
- Mark of the Year (2009)
- Adelaide Crows Leading Goal Kicker (2002 and 2008)
