= Trent Hentschel =

Australian rules footballer, born 1982

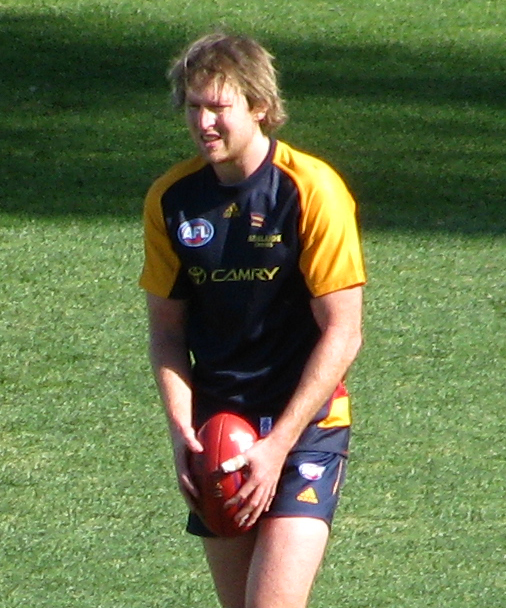

Personal information
- Full name: Trent Hentschel
- Born: 25 December 1982 (age 43); Adelaide, Australia
- Original team: Woodville-West Torrens (SANFL)/Palmerston Magpies
- Draft: 5th overall, 2002 Pre-Season Draft
- Height: 193 cm (6 ft 4 in)
- Weight: 91 kg (201 lb)
- Position: Key forward

Playing career^{1}
Years	Club	Games (Goals)
2003–2010	Adelaide	71 (94)
- ^{1} Playing statistics correct to the end of 2010.

Trent Hentschel (born 25 December 1982) is a former Australian rules footballer who played for the Adelaide Football Club in the Australian Football League (AFL). He was taken in the 2002 Pre-Season Draft with pick 5, and currently serves as the defence development coach of the Port Adelaide Football Club.

== Playing career ==
=== 2003–2004 ===
Debuting for Adelaide in 2003 as a 20-year-old, Hentschel took his time to adapt to the speed of AFL football. He played just three games in the 2003 season, failing to register a kick in his first game (finishing only with one handball). In total, Hentschel had 19 disposals with an average of just over six for the season, kicking just two points.

In 2004, Hentschel started well playing his first 14 games. He kicked a four goal haul at Subiaco Oval against West Coast, and consistently was able to pick up more than ten disposals a match. He then had a few small injuries, that kept him out for four matches. He averaged 11 disposals for the season, and kicked 16 goals.

=== 2005–2006 ===
Hentschel started to stand up and become a strong marking forward for Adelaide in 2005. He had a slow start to the year, kicking three goals against Collingwood before missing five games. He finished the year strongly though, playing in all three of Adelaide's finals. He played 21 matches in the year, averaging 12 disposals and five marks while kicking 26 goals.

The 2006 season was arguably Hentschel's best in the AFL, kicking a career high 42 goals for the year, including an eight goal match against Essendon. However, during the third quarter in round 20 against Port Adelaide, Hentschel's anterior cruciate ligament (ACL) was torn and his kneecap was dislocated and pushed inwards when Port Adelaide player Matt Thomas fell on it. Hentschel was then taken off the ground on a stretcher.

=== 2007–2009 ===
Surgery to repair Hentschel's damaged knee was carried out in February 2007 after the knee had healed sufficiently to undergo a reconstruction of his ACL. He did not play a game in 2007 and 2008.

Hentschel had finally recovered from his ACL injury by 2009 and had a successful return in the pre-season competition before making his official comeback in round 1 of the 2009 season against Collingwood. However, the stress of playing and training fully competitively again caused his knee to swell up, requiring further surgery. He returned successfully in round 20, scoring four goals against Hawthorn. Hentschel played out the rest of the season without any injuries, including in the Crows' two finals against Essendon and Collingwood. He kicked a total of six goals in four games.

In 2010 Hentschel succumbed to a swollen knee during the round 3 match against Melbourne, and was unable to return to football, retiring towards the end of 2010.

=== SANFL career ===
Hentschel played a total of 50 games for Woodville-West Torrens, until his retirement in July 2011 due to a recurring back injury.

== Coaching career ==
In 2015, Hentschel joined Port Adelaide as a development coach.
