= Ivan Maric =

Australian rules footballer (born 1986)

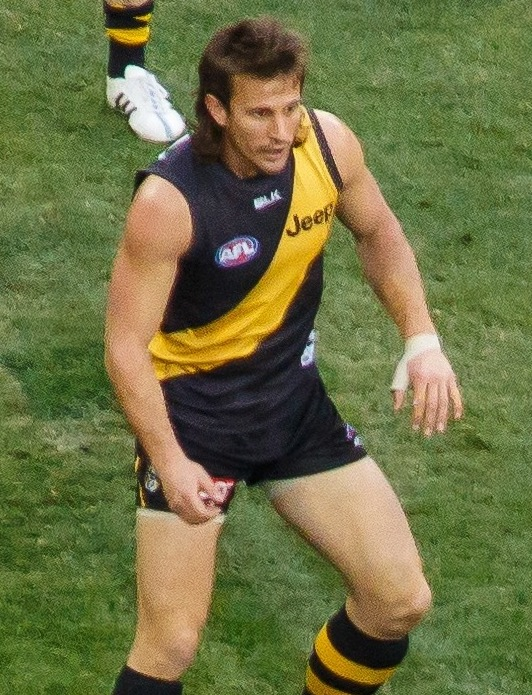
- Maric in July 2015

Personal information
- Full name: Ivan Marić
- Born: 4 January 1986 (age 40); Victoria, Australia
- Original teams: Keilor (EDFL); Calder Cannons (TAC Cup)
- Draft: No. 40, 2004 national draft
- Debut: Round 6, 2006, Adelaide vs. Port Adelaide, at AAMI Stadium
- Height: 200 cm (6 ft 7 in)
- Weight: 102 kg (225 lb)
- Position: Ruck

Playing career^{1}
Years	Club	Games (Goals)
2005–2011	Adelaide	77 (28)
2012–2017	Richmond	80 (33)
Total		157 (61)
- ^{1} Playing statistics correct to the end of 2017.

Career highlights
- Maurie Fleming Medal (3rd RFC B&F): 2012; Richmond vice-captain: 2015–2016; All-Australian Squad: 2012

Ivan Maric (Croatian: Ivan Marić, /ˈiːvɑːn ˈmæriːtʃ/ ee-vahn mar-itch; born 4 January 1986) is a former professional Australian rules footballer who played for the Richmond Football Club and the Adelaide Football Club in the Australian Football League (AFL). He was Richmond's vice-captain in 2015 and 2016. In 2017 he began working as a ruck coach at Richmond.

== Junior and state league football ==
A late starter to the game, Maric didn't play competitive football until he was 16 because of a blossoming basketball career. Maric nearly quit in his second season with the Calder Cannons because of his frustration with the technical aspects of the game. However Maric was talked into playing on and was drafted by the Crows with pick 40 in the 2004 AFL draft only months later. Maric was assigned to the Port Adelaide Magpies in the SANFL where he quickly became the number one ruckman in 2005.

== AFL playing career ==
=== Adelaide (2005–2011) ===
Maric made his AFL debut in round six of the 2006 season, in the Showdown against Port Adelaide. He had seven disposals and kicked 1 goal on in the match. Maric played a total of eight matches in his debut season, averaging six disposals and nine hitouts per-game.

In 2007, a hip injury meant that he missed the early part of the season and returned to the senior side for the round 14 match against Hawthorn. In the round 19 clash with the Geelong Football Club Maric was promoted to the number 1 ruckman but was then dropped for the round 20 clash with the Western Bulldogs. In 2008, a pre-season injury and form delayed his return to midway through the season. He played out the rest of the season in the ruck, cementing his spot as the new number one ruck. 2009 saw Maric continued as Adelaide's clear number one ruckman.

In 2011 the combination of the new interchange rules and the arrival of Sam Jacobs at the Crows saw Maric given limited opportunities. Maric played just six games for the season. At the season's end it was reported Maric was keen to leave the Crows, with strong interest from Richmond. He was traded to Richmond in the 2011 Trade Week period, with Adelaide accepting Richmond's second-round pick (no. 37) for him, which was then subsequently on-traded to St. Kilda for Tom Lynch.

=== Richmond (2012–2017) ===
Maric joined Richmond in 2012 and established himself as the club's number one ruckman. In his first year, he played 21 games and finished third in the club's best and fairest award, the Jack Dyer Medal. In November 2012, he was voted onto the club's seven player leadership group by his peers, for the 2013 season. In 2013, Maric missed three games through injury, but still played 20 games.

Maric was returned to the club's (now five man) leadership group ahead of the 2014 season.

In January 2015, Maric was appointed joint vice-captain for the 2015 season, along with Brett Deledio. He played 22 matches that season, including an appearance in the club's elimination final against North Melbourne.

Maric fell out of Richmond's core playing group in 2016, being replaced as the team's premier ruck by Shaun Hampson. As a result, Maric played only three AFL matches that season. Despite speculation he was considering retirement, he signed a one-year contract extension to play on at the club through the end of the 2017 season.

He did not play a match at senior level in 2017, instead leading the club's reserves side in the VFL. He was a member of that side's losing grand final team.

In June 2017, Maric announced he would retire from football at the conclusion of the 2017 season.

== Coaching career ==
In 2017 Maric worked as a playing coach at Richmond, serving as ruck coach in addition to playing reserves football in the VFL. Upon announcing his retirement, Maric accepted a permanent off-field role at Richmond, as a player development and ruck coach.

== Playing statistics ==
Legend
G	Goals	K	Kicks	D	Disposals	T	Tackles
B	Behinds	H	Handballs	M	Marks	H/O	Hit-outs

Season	Team	No.	Games	Totals								Averages (per game)							
Season	Team	No.	Games	G	B	K	H	D	M	T	H/O	G	B	K	H	D	M	T	H/O
2006	Adelaide	20	8	1	0	20	28	48	8	15	73	0.1	0.0	2.5	3.5	6.0	1.0	1.9	9.1
2007	Adelaide	20	6	5	1	19	24	43	18	15	48	0.8	0.2	3.2	4.0	7.2	3.0	2.5	8.0
2008	Adelaide	20	16	10	4	58	101	159	43	51	274	0.6	0.3	3.6	6.3	9.9	2.7	3.2	17.1
2009	Adelaide	20	20	5	4	67	129	196	57	48	358	0.3	0.2	3.4	6.5	9.8	2.9	2.4	17.9
2010	Adelaide	20	21	4	1	72	145	217	62	41	370	0.2	0.0	3.4	6.9	10.3	3.0	2.0	17.6
2011	Adelaide	20	6	3	1	33	32	65	19	14	73	0.5	0.2	5.5	5.3	10.8	3.2	2.3	12.2
2012	Richmond	20	21	7	6	158	175	333	92	79	652	0.3	0.3	7.5	8.3	15.9	4.4	3.8	31.0
2013	Richmond	20	20	10	7	119	138	257	67	50	464	0.5	0.4	6.0	6.9	12.9	3.4	2.5	23.2
2014	Richmond	20	14	5	2	101	100	201	47	40	356	0.4	0.1	7.2	7.1	14.4	3.4	2.9	25.4
2015	Richmond	20	22	11	4	147	140	287	64	61	558	0.5	0.2	6.7	6.4	13.0	2.9	2.8	25.4
2016	Richmond	20	3	0	0	10	9	19	4	6	87	0.0	0.0	3.3	3.0	6.3	1.3	2.0	29.0
2017	Richmond	20	0	—	—	—	—	—	—	—	—	—	—	—	—	—	—	—	—
Career			157	61	30	804	1021	1825	481	420	3313	0.4	0.2	5.1	6.5	11.6	3.1	2.7	21.1

== Personal life ==
Born in Australia, Maric is of Croatian descent. Maric is a committee member of St Albans Saints.

Maric is a supporter of the Melbourne City Football Club.
