= 2023 Brisbane Lions season =

Brisbane Lions AFL season

Brisbane Lions
2023 season
- Coach: Chris Fagan (7th season)
- Captains: Harris Andrews & Lachie Neale (1st season)
- Home ground: The Gabba
- Practice Match: Won by 46
- Home & Away: 2nd (17-6-0)
- Finals: Runners-up
- Leading goalkicker: Joe Daniher (61 Goals)
- Highest home attendance: 33,565 vs. Collingwood (Round 4)
- Lowest home attendance: 23,286 vs. Gold Coast (Round 10)
- Average home attendance: 29,285
- Club membership: 54,676

The 2023 Brisbane Lions season was the club's 27th season of senior competition in the Australian Football League (AFL). The Lions were captained by Harris Andrews and Lachie Neale. This was the first year of their co-captaincy. Chris Fagan completed his seventh season as the senior coach of the Brisbane Lions.

== Overview ==
Captain	Coach	Home ground	W-L-D	Ladder	Finals	Best and fairest	Leading goalkicker
Harris Andrews & Lachie Neale	Chris Fagan	The Gabba	17-6-0	2nd	Runners-Up	Harris Andrews	Joe Daniher (61)

== Squad ==
Playing List & Statistics
Player	No.	Games	Goals	Behinds	Kicks	Handballs	Disposals	Tackles	Marks	Hitouts
Kai Lohmann	1	6	1	4	24	18	42	11	11	0
Devon Robertson	2	16	3	2	71	73	144	42	34	0
Joe Daniher	3	26	61	37	316	72	388	20	154	48
Callum Ah Chee	4	12	6	5	81	45	126	27	42	0
Josh Dunkley	5	24	2	7	261	321	582	165	120	0
Hugh McCluggage	6	25	13	13	327	231	558	91	117	0
Jarrod Berry	7	25	10	5	268	172	440	64	119	0
Will Ashcroft	8	18	8	6	200	198	398	63	61	0
Lachie Neale (c)	9	26	3	11	311	383	694	106	109	0
Daniel Rich	10	7	2	0	113	24	137	2	38	0
Lincoln McCarthy	11	24	28	11	188	93	281	72	62	0
Nakia Cockatoo	12	0	0	0	0	0	0	0	0	0
Blake Coleman	13	0	0	0	0	0	0	0	0	0
James Madden	14	2	0	0	5	2	7	4	0	0
Dayne Zorko	15	20	8	8	272	106	378	71	118	0
Cam Rayner	16	26	23	17	215	153	368	58	102	0
Jarryd Lyons	17	10	2	1	47	46	93	24	12	0
Keidean Coleman	18	23	2	4	306	86	392	62	120	0
Jack Gunston	19	17	22	14	134	36	170	16	88	0
Jaxon Prior	20	5	1	1	36	7	43	11	14	0
Tom Fullarton	21	0	0	0	0	0	0	0	0	0
Harry Sharp	22	3	2	0	34	6	40	5	13	0
Charlie Cameron	23	26	59	27	196	61	257	76	88	0
Marcus Adams	24	0	0	0	0	0	0	0	0	0
Henry Smith	25	0	0	0	0	0	0	0	0	0
Conor McKenna	26	26	7	5	358	81	439	38	95	0
Darcy Gardiner	27	4	0	0	22	12	34	10	12	0
Jaspa Fletcher	28	14	8	6	102	63	165	17	65	0
James Tunstill	29	2	0	0	5	7	12	0	2	0
Eric Hipwood	30	26	41	29	200	57	257	49	140	5
Harris Andrews (c)	31	26	1	0	281	88	369	31	203	0
Darcy Fort	32	7	1	3	37	22	59	11	12	90
Zac Baily	33	24	29	19	254	148	402	72	76	0
Shadeau Brain	34	0	0	0	0	0	0	0	0	0
Ryan Lester	35	19	1	1	197	71	268	38	119	0
Rhys Mathieson	36	0	0	0	0	0	0	0	0	0
Brandon Starcevich	37	26	1	0	233	72	305	40	116	0
Carter Michael	39	0	0	0	0	0	0	0	0	0
Jack Payne	40	23	0	0	177	48	225	20	124	0
Darragh Joyce	41	5	0	0	37	6	43	2	25	0
Noah Answorth	43	4	0	0	18	14	32	11	10	0
Darcy Wilmot	44	26	5	4	297	109	406	43	107	0
Kalin Lane	45	0	0	0	0	0	0	0	0	0
Oscar McInerney	46	25	9	7	173	137	310	72	44	0
Darryl McDowell-White	50	0	0	0	0	0	0	0	0	0

=== Squad changes ===
==== In ====
No.	Name	Position	Previous club	via
8	(Queensland) Will Ashcroft	Midfielder	Sandringham Dragons	AFL national draft, first round (pick No. 2)
34	(New South Wales) Shadeau Brain	Forward	Noosa	Category B rookie selections
5	(New South Wales) Josh Dunkley	Midfielder	Western Bulldogs	trade
28	(Queensland) Jaspa Fletcher	Midfielder	Sherwood Magpies	AFL national draft, first round (pick No. 12)
19	(Victoria (state)) Jack Gunston	Forward	Hawthorn	trade
50	(Queensland) Darryl McDowell-White	Forward	Brisbane VFL	Category B rookie selections
26	(Ulster) Conor McKenna	Defender	Essendon	pre-season supplemental selection period

==== Out ====
No.	Name	Position	New Club	via
13	(Victoria (state)) Tom Berry	Forward	Gold Coast	trade
42	(Victoria (state)) Mitch Cox	Forward	Williamstown Seagulls	delisted
26	(Queensland) Connor McFadyen	Forward	Sturt	delisted
25	(Victoria (state)) Daniel McStay	Forward	Collingwood	free agent
5	(Tasmania) Mitch Robinson	Midfielder	-	retired
8	(Victoria (state)) Ely Smith	Midfielder	South Adelaide	delisted
41	(Munster) Deividas Uosis	Defender	-	delisted

== Season ==
=== Pre-season matches ===
Brisbane's 2023 practice match and AAMI Community Series fixtures
Date and local time	Opponent	Scores			Venue	Ref
Date and local time	Opponent	Home	Away	Result	Venue	Ref
Friday, 24 February (4:20 pm)	Sydney	8.6.54	15.9.99	Won by 45 points	Tramway Oval [A]	
Thursday, 2 March (12:00 pm)	Geelong	13.13.91	6.9.45	Won by 46 points	Brighton Home Arena [H]	

=== Home & Away Season ===
Round	Date and local time	Opponent	Home	Away	Result	Venue	Attendance	Ladder position	Ref
Round	Date and local time	Opponent	Scores			Venue	Attendance	Ladder position	Ref
1	Saturday, 18 March (4:05 pm)	Port Adelaide	18.18.126	11.6.72	Lost by 54 points	Adelaide Oval [A]	34,255	15th	
2	Friday, 24 March (7:55 pm)	Melbourne	14.9.93	13.4.82	Won by 11 points	The Gabba [H]	30,047	12th	
3	Thursday, 30 March (7:20 pm)	Western Bulldogs	10.7.67	7.11.53	Lost by 14 points	Marvel Stadium [A]	23,665	14th	
4	Thursday, 6 April (7:35 pm)	Collingwood	18.8.116	11.17.83	Won by 33 points	The Gabba [H]	33,565	8th	
5	Saturday, 15 April (12:40 pm)	North Melbourne	22.20.152	12.5.77	Won by 75 points	Adelaide Hills [H]	7,329	8th	
6	Saturday, 22 April (4:35 pm)	Greater Western Sydney	13.9.87	16.12.108	Won by 21 points	Manuka Oval [A]	10,461	6th	
7	Saturday, 29 April (1:45 pm)	Fremantle	17.13.115	10.7.67	Won by 48 points	The Gabba [H]	25,528	4th	
8	Friday, 5 May (7:50 pm)	Carlton	11.8.74	15.10.100	Won by 26 points	Marvel Stadium [A]	45,548	4th	
9	Saturday, 13 May (7:25 pm)	Essendon	12.15.87	6.9.45	Won by 42 points	The Gabba [H]	31,898	3rd	
10	Saturday, 20 May (7:25 pm)	Gold Coast	16.11.107	9.10.64	Won by 43 points	The Gabba [H]	23,286	2nd	
11	Sunday, 28 May (6:55 pm)	Adelaide	14.11.95	10.18.78	Lost by 17 points	Adelaide Oval [A]	33,188	3rd	
12	Bye							4th	Bye
13	Saturday, 10 June (1:45 pm)	Hawthorn	15.8.98	11.7.73	Lost by 25 points	MCG [A]	35,869	4th	
14	Friday, 16 June (7:50 pm)	Sydney	13.19.97	12.9.81	Won by 16 points	The Gabba [H]	28,561	4th	
15	Friday, 23 June (7:50 pm)	St Kilda	8.8.56	12.12.84	Won by 28 points	Marvel Stadium [A]	28,985	3rd	
16	Thursday, 29 June (7:20 pm)	Richmond	20.14.134	7.11.53	Won by 81 points	The Gabba [H]	30,022	3rd	
17	Saturday, 8 July (1:45 pm)	West Coast	16.20.116	5.5.35	won by 81 points	The Gabba [H]	24,843	3rd	
18	Friday, 14 July (7:50 pm)	Melbourne	16.9.105	16.8.104	Lost by 1 point	MCG [A]	38,030	3rd	
19	Saturday, 22 July (4:35 pm)	Geelong	9.10.64	7.1153	Won by 11 points	The Gabba [H]	32,586	3rd	
20	Saturday, 29 July (4:35 pm)	Gold Coast	15.6.96	7.3.55	Lost by 41 points	Heritage Bank Stadium [A]	14,097	3rd	
21	Sunday, 6 August (2:40 pm)	Fremantle	11.8.74	11.11.77	Won by 3 points	Optus Stadium [A]	37,845	3rd	
22	Saturday, 12 August (4:35 pm)	Adelaide	15.9.99	13.15.93	Won by 6 points	The Gabba [H]	30,107	2nd	
23	Friday, 18 August (7:50 pm)	Collingwood	15.10.100	19.10.124	Won by 18 points	Marvel Stadium [A]	38,350	2nd	
24	Saturday, 26 August (4:35 pm)	St Kilda	9.18.72	9.6.60	Won by 12 points	The Gabba [H]	31,689	2nd	

=== Finals Series ===
Round	Date and local time	Opponent	Home	Away	Result	Venue	Attendance	Ref
Round	Date and local time	Opponent	Scores			Venue	Attendance	Ref
2nd Qualifying final	Saturday, 9 September (7:25 pm)	Port Adelaide	19.9.123	11.9.75	Won by 48 points	The Gabba [H]	36,020	
2nd Preliminary final	Saturday, 23 September (5:15 pm)	Carlton	11.13.79	9.9.63	Won by 16 points	The Gabba [H]	36,012	
Grand Final	Saturday, 30 September (2:30 pm)	Collingwood	12.18.90	13.8.86	Lost by 4 points	MCG [A]	100,024	

=== Ladder ===
Pos	Team	Pld	W	L	D	PF	PA	PP	Pts	Qualification
1	Collingwood (P)	23	18	5	0	2142	1687	127.0	72	Finals series
2	Brisbane Lions	23	17	6	0	2180	1771	123.1	68	Finals series
3	Port Adelaide	23	17	6	0	2149	1906	112.7	68	Finals series
4	Melbourne	23	16	7	0	2079	1660	125.2	64	Finals series
5	Carlton	23	13	9	1	1922	1697	113.3	54	Finals series
6	St Kilda	23	13	10	0	1775	1647	107.8	52	Finals series
7	Greater Western Sydney	23	13	10	0	2018	1885	107.1	52	Finals series
8	Sydney	23	12	10	1	2050	1863	110.0	50	Finals series
9	Western Bulldogs	23	12	11	0	1919	1766	108.7	48	
10	Adelaide	23	11	12	0	2193	1877	116.8	44	
11	Essendon	23	11	12	0	1838	2050	89.7	44	
12	Geelong	23	10	12	1	2088	1855	112.6	42	
13	Richmond	23	10	12	1	1856	1983	93.6	42	
14	Fremantle	23	10	13	0	1835	1898	96.7	40	
15	Gold Coast	23	9	14	0	1839	2006	91.7	36	
16	Hawthorn	23	7	16	0	1686	2101	80.2	28	
17	North Melbourne	23	3	20	0	1657	2318	71.5	12	
18	West Coast	23	3	20	0	1418	2674	53.0	12	

Source: afl.com.au
Rules for classification: 1) points; 2) percentage; 3) number of points for
(P) Premiers

=== Awards & Milestones ===
==== AFL Awards ====
- Brownlow Medal - Lachie Neale
- 2023 22under22 selection – Will Ashcroft
- 2023 All-Australian team – Charlie Cameron

==== AFL Awards Nominations ====
- 2023 22under22 selection 44-man squad – Will Ashcroft, Darcy Wilmot
- 2023 All-Australian team 44-man squad – Harris Andrews, Charlie Cameron, Joe Daniher, Lachie Neale

==== Milestones ====
- Round 1 - Will Ashcroft (AFL Debut)
- Round 1 - Jack Gunston (Brisbane Debut)
- Round 1 - Conor McKenna (Brisbane Debut)
- Round 1 - Josh Dunkley (Brisbane Debut)
- Round 2 - Darragh Joyce (Brisbane Debut)
- Round 2 - Jarrod Berry (50 Goals)
- Round 6 - Zac Bailey (100 Games)
- Round 7 - Eric Hipwood (200 Goals)
- Round 8 - Charlie Cameron (100 Consecutive Games)
- Round 8 - Zac Bailey (100 Goals)
- Round 9 - Joe Daniher (300 Goals)
- Round 14 - Cam Rayner (100 Games)
- Round 14 - Jaspa Fletcher (AFL Debut)
- Round 16 - Lachie Neale (100 Brisbane Games)
- Round 16 - Charlie Cameron (150 Brisbane Goals)
- Round 22 - Hugh McCluggage (150 Games)
- Round 22 - Conor McKenna (100 Games)
- Round 23 - Cam Rayner (100 Goals)
- Round 24 - Eric Hipwood (150 Games)
- Second Qualifying Final - Charlie Cameron (200 Games)
