= Greater Western Sydney v Brisbane Lions (2024 AFL semi-final) =

2024 AFL semi-final
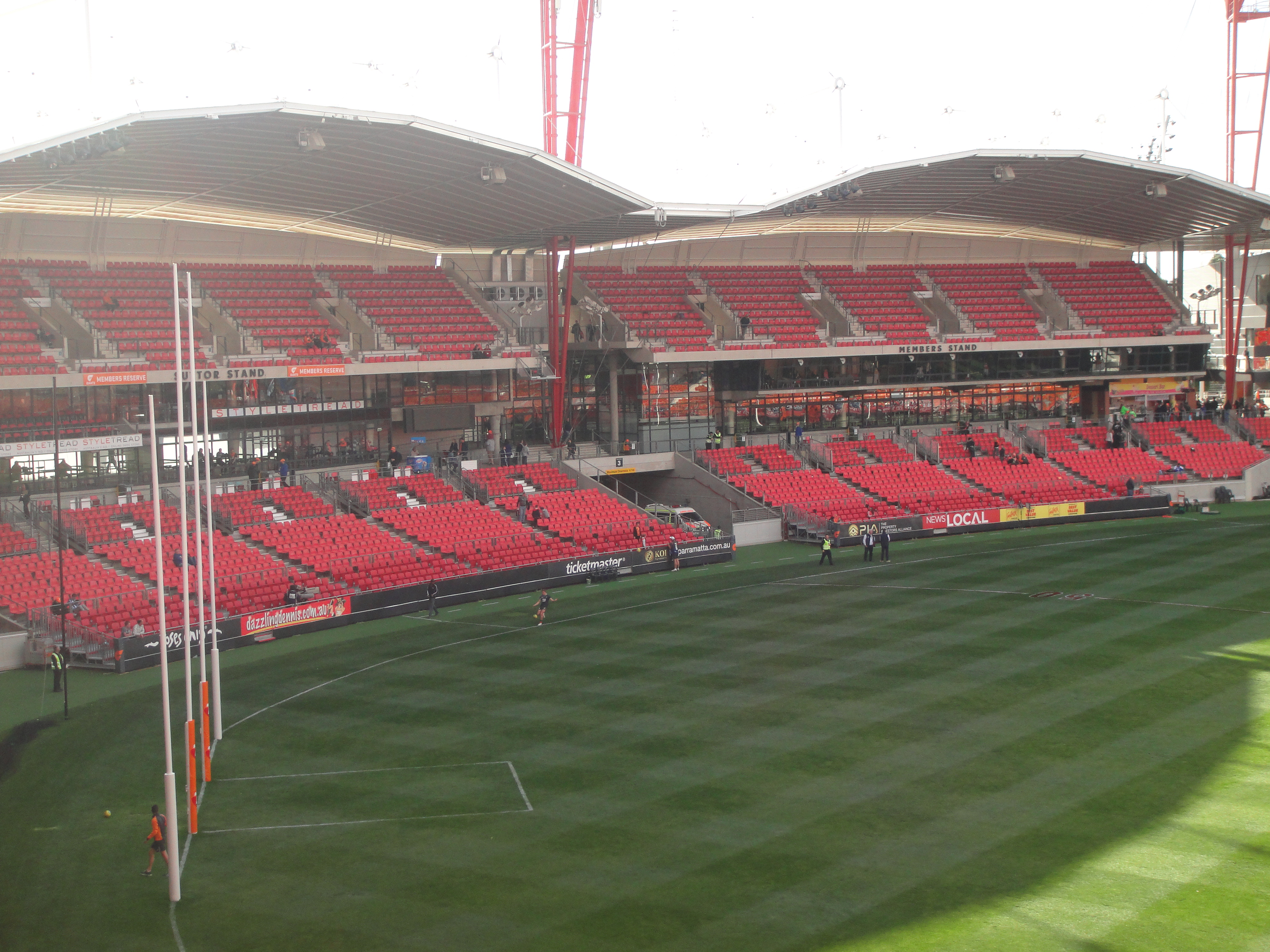
- Engie Stadium, where the game took place.

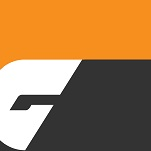

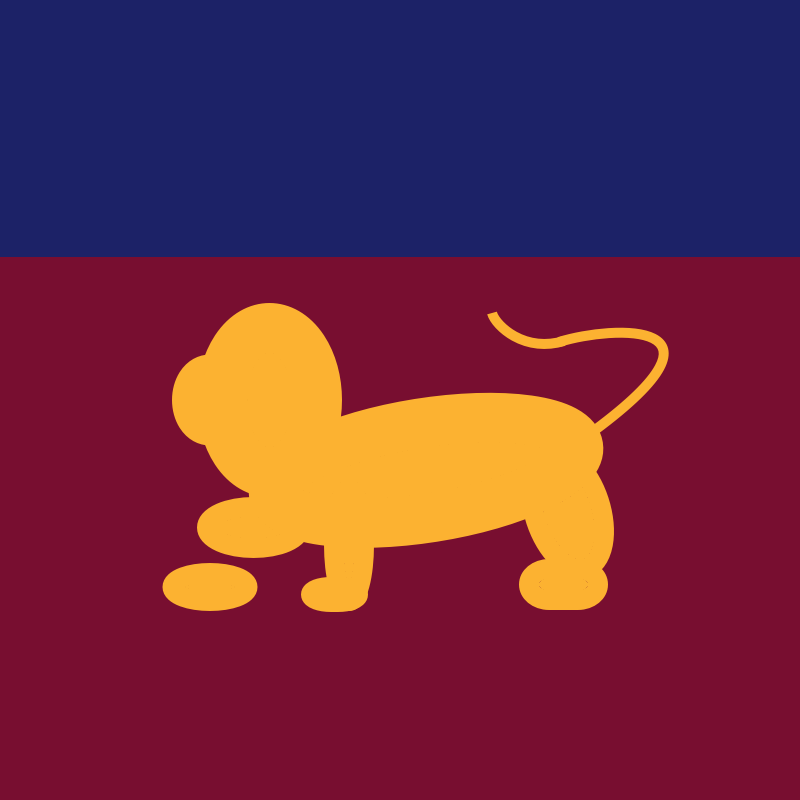
Greater Western Sydney	Brisbane Lions
15.10 (100)	15.15 (105)
	1	2	3	4
GWS	5.3 (33)	8.7 (55)	14.8 (92)	15.10 (100)
BL	3.5 (23)	4.10 (34)	9.13 (67)	15.15 (105)
- Date: 14 September 2024
- Stadium: Engie Stadium
- Attendance: 18,375
- Umpires: Nick Foot, Jamie Broadbent, Simon Meredith, Craig Fleer

Broadcast in Australia
- Network: Seven Network
- Commentators: Alister Nicholson, Luke Darcy, Luke Hodge, Dale Thomas

In the semi-final round of the 2024 AFL Season finals on 14 September 2024, an Australian rules football match was played between the Brisbane Lions and the Greater Western Sydney Giants. The match saw the largest semifinal comeback in VFL/AFL history, and the equal second largest of any final, (Note: See chart.) with Brisbane coming back from a 44-point deficit to win by 5 points over GWS. Brisbane went on to defeat the Sydney Swans in the 2024 AFL Grand Final for its first premiership since 2003. This match has been widely regarded as one of the greatest finals games ever played.

== Background ==
Coming off its first grand final appearance since 2004 in the 2023 season in which it narrowly lost to Collingwood, the Brisbane Lions began the home-and-away season with a record of 4–6–1 through 11 rounds, before going on a 9-game winning streak to improve to 13–6–1 through 21 rounds, placing them second on the ladder, just behind the Sydney Swans whom it had defeated as part of that streak. Brisbane then lost two of the final three home-and-away games, falling to 5th place on the ladder with a 14–8–1 record and a strong percentage of 121.9, narrowly missing the double chance. Brisbane faced Carlton in the elimination final, winning by 28 points, to progress to the semi-final.

The Greater Western Sydney Giants began the season with a dominant 5–1 start which saw the team on top of the ladder, before an inconsistent mid-season stretch saw it lose four of their next six games to sit seventh at 7–5 after round 13. From there, the team found form again, winning eight of its next nine matches to finish fourth on the ladder with a 16–7 record. The Giants were narrowly defeated by Sydney in the qualifying final 13.10 (88) to 12.10 (82), having led the match by 27 points late in the third quarter.

Greater Western Sydney and Brisbane met twice during the home-and-away season, with both matches won by the former: in round 7 at Manuka Oval, Greater Western Sydney recorded a 54-point victory over its rival in one of its most comprehensive performances of the year; and in round 22 at the Gabba, the Giants won by 18 points with six unanswered goals in the final quarter, ending Brisbane's nine-game winning streak.

== Teams ==
The teams were announced on Thursday, 12 September. Brisbane named an unchanged 23 from its elimination final win over Carlton, with defender Jack Payne cleared to play despite a knee concern that saw him subbed out the previous week. GWS made one change to its qualifying final 23, with forward Toby Bedford returning from suspension to replace Toby McMullin.

Brisbane Lions	GWS Giants

Brisbane Lions
B:	15 Dayne Zorko	31 Harris Andrews (c)	26 Conor McKenna
HB:	29 Darcy Wilmot	40 Jack Payne	35 Ryan Lester
C:	28 Jaspa Fletcher	8 Will Ashcroft	6 Hugh McCluggage
HF:	16 Cam Rayner	3 Joe Daniher	7 Jarrod Berry
F:	23 Charlie Cameron	30 Eric Hipwood	33 Zac Bailey
Foll:	46 Oscar McInerney	5 Josh Dunkley	9 Lachie Neale (c)
Int:	1 Kai Lohmann	4 Callum Ah Chee	13 Logan Morris
Int:	37 Brandon Starcevich		
Coach:	Chris Fagan		

Greater Western Sydney
B:	27 Harry Himmelberg	15 Sam Taylor	39 Connor Idun
HB:	6 Lachie Whitfield	44 Jack Buckley	36 Harry Perryman
C:	17 Finn Callaghan	12 Tom Green	22 Josh Kelly
HF:	16 Brent Daniels	5 Aaron Cadman	13 Isaac Cumming
F:	2 Darcy Jones	23 Jesse Hogan	4 Toby Greene (c)
Foll:	32 Kieren Briggs	3 Stephen Coniglio	20 James Peatling
Int:	8 Callan Ward	7 Lachie Ash	14 Toby Bedford
Int:	33 Xavier O'Halloran		
Coach:	Adam Kingsley		

== Match summary ==
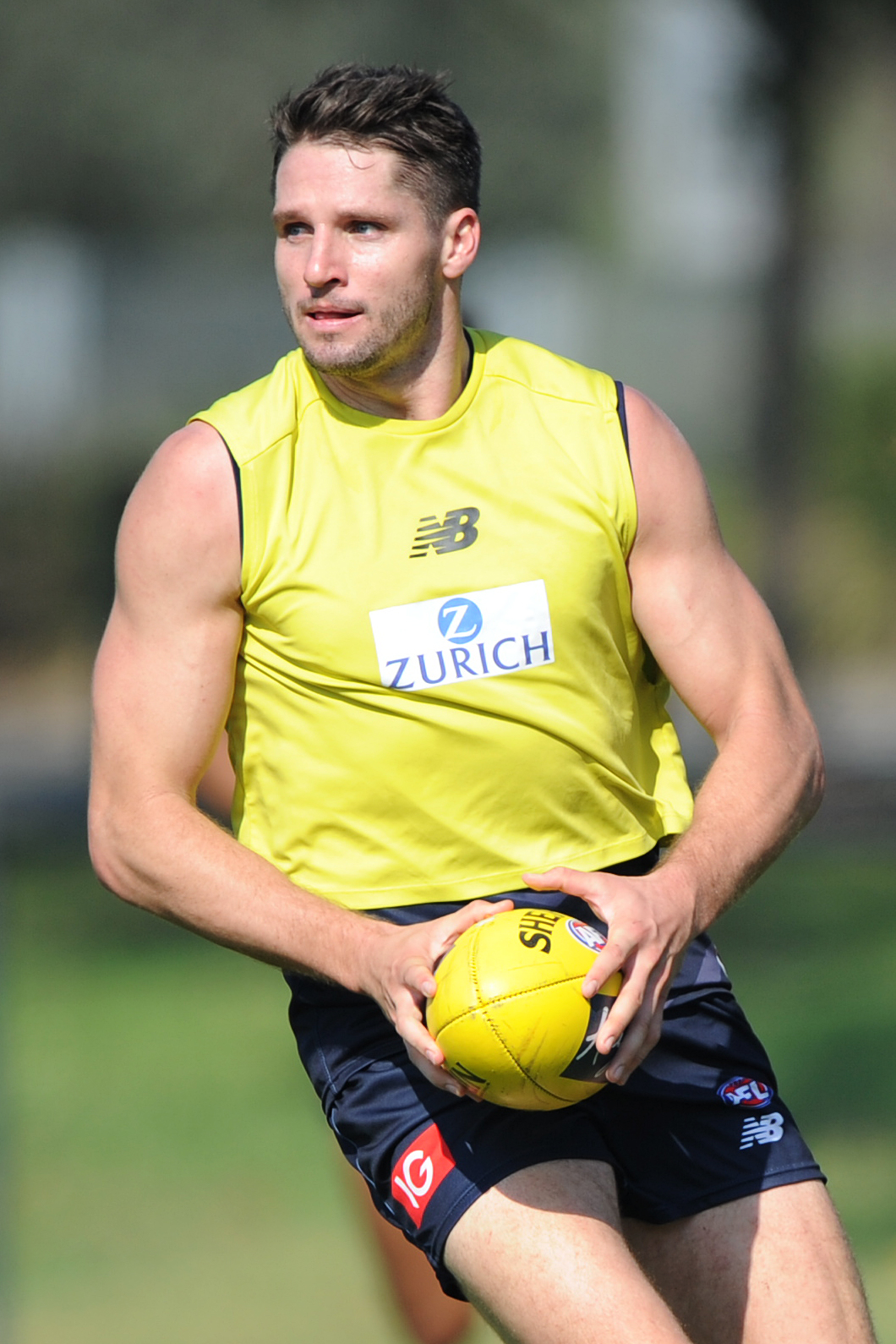
Giants forward Jesse Hogan kicked five goals in the loss.

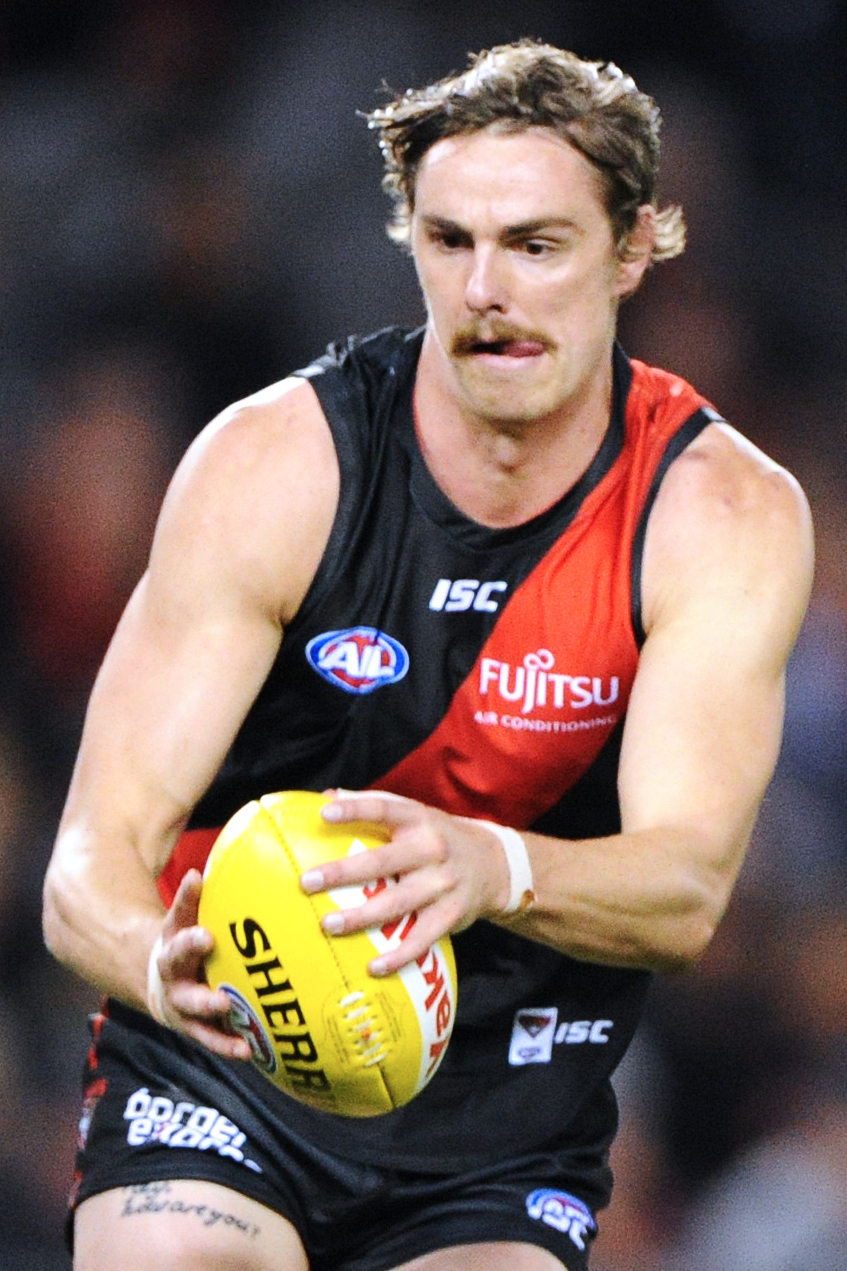
Veteran Lions forward and former Essendon player Joe Daniher kicked 4 goals including the last 2 in the final minutes to put Brisbane ahead.

=== First quarter ===
Greater Western Sydney made the brighter start, with early goals from Aaron Cadman and Toby Greene helping the Giants to a three-point lead midway through the first term. Joe Daniher responded with Brisbane's first goal in the 16th minute to briefly give the Lions the lead of the match. GWS then kicked two quick goals from James Peatling, including one from a forward stoppage and another after a turnover in the defensive half. Jesse Hogan added a late goal to increase the Giants' lead. Brisbane then responded with two goals from Callum Ah Chee and Charlie Cameron to keep the score within reach. At quarter time, GWS 5.3 (33) led Brisbane 3.5 (23) by 10 points.

=== Second quarter ===
Brisbane opened the quarter strongly, as Kai Lohmann kicked his second goal in the opening minute, narrowing the margin to four points. A series of behinds from both teams followed before goals by Hogan and Greene pushed GWS to a 21-point half time lead, with GWS 8.7 (55) leading Brisbane 4.10 (34).

=== Third quarter ===
GWS opened strongest in the third quarter, kicking four goals through Kieran Briggs, Jesse Hogan, Tom Green, and Lachie Ash to propel the Giants' lead to 44 points (80-36) which was the largest deficit during the match. Brisbane followed by kicking the next five goals over the course of the next ten minutes. GWS pushed back to score the final two goals of the quarter during the last few minutes, and the Giants 14.8 (92) led Brisbane 9.13 (67) at the conclusion of the third quarter.

=== Final quarter ===
Toby Greene kicked the opening goal of the final quarter for GWS in the second minute to increase the lead to 31 points. Brisbane's Eric Hipwood led off a flurry of Brisbane goals, as the Lions kicked five unanswered goals in 13 minutes to narrow the margin. Eric Hipwood, Cameron, Zorko, Jaspa Fletcher, and two from Daniher turned the 17-point deficit into a 5-point lead with three minutes remaining. Brisbane held on until the siren sounded for a final score of GWS 15.10 (100) defeated by Brisbane 15.15 (105).

=== Overall ===
Brisbane edged out GWS in a tightly contested battle, overcoming deficits in key pressure and clearance stats to prevail through superior inside-50 efficiency and composed ball use. Although GWS led the disposal count (338–316), tackles (85–65), and hitouts (69–38), Brisbane's methodical, short-kick game helped them control key moments and generate better quality forward entries. The Lions led inside-50s (56–49) and were more potent with the ball in attack, registering 30 scoring shots to 25 and converting more efficiently inside-50 despite a lower overall goal conversion (50% to GWS's 60%). Brisbane's structure was particularly dominant in transition, maintaining pressure through strong contested possession and territory control, only being out-marked by GWS 76-72. Brisbane's midfield, led by Will Ashcroft (27 disposals, 2 goals) and Josh Dunkley (23 disposals), provided consistent drive, while Joe Daniher's 4 goals helped keep the scoreboard ticking in critical moments. Despite a strong showing from GWS forward Jesse Hogan (5 goals), Brisbane's collective effort saw them withstand GWS's surges and advance to the preliminary final against Geelong.

The 44-point comeback was the largest semifinal comeback in VFL/AFL history, and the equal-second largest in any final behind only Geelong's 47-point comeback in the 1931 preliminary final against Carlton.

=== Scorecard ===
First semi-final 2024
Saturday, 14 September (7:30 pm)	Greater Western Sydney 15.10 (100)	def. by	Brisbane Lions 15.15 (105)	Engie Stadium (crowd: 18,357)	Report; Stats
5.3 (33); 8.7 (55); 14.8 (92); 15.10 (100)	Q1; Q2; Q3; Q4	3.5 (23); 4.10 (34); 9.13 (67); 15.15 (105)
Hogan 5, Greene 3, Peatling 2, Ash, Briggs, Cadman, Green, O'Halloran	Goals	Daniher 4, Cameron 2, Lohmann 2, Zorko 2, Ah Chee, Bailey, Fletcher, Hipwood, McInerney
Green, Hogan, Peatling, Kelly, Whitfield, Greene	Best	McCluggage, Daniher, Berry, Ashcroft, Zorko, Dunkley
The Brisbane Lions trailed by 44 points during the third quarter and went on to win, recording its biggest ever comeback in a final.

== Aftermath ==
Following this victory, the Lions went on to have another smaller, yet significant comeback against the Geelong Cats in the preliminary final. After trailing by 25 points in the third quarter the Lions came back to win by 10 points, progressing the Lions to their second straight grand final appearance. In the grand final, the Lions defeated the minor premiership winning Sydney Swans by a convincing margin of 60 points for their first premiership in over 20 years. The final margin was 60 points, Brisbane 18.12 (120) defeating Sydney 9.6 (60).

== See also ==
- 2024 AFL season
- Miracle on Grass (Australian rules football)
- Essendon vs Kangaroos (2001 AFL season)
- Miracle Match (Australian rules football)
