= 2024 AFL Grand Final =

Grand final of the 2024 Australian Football League season

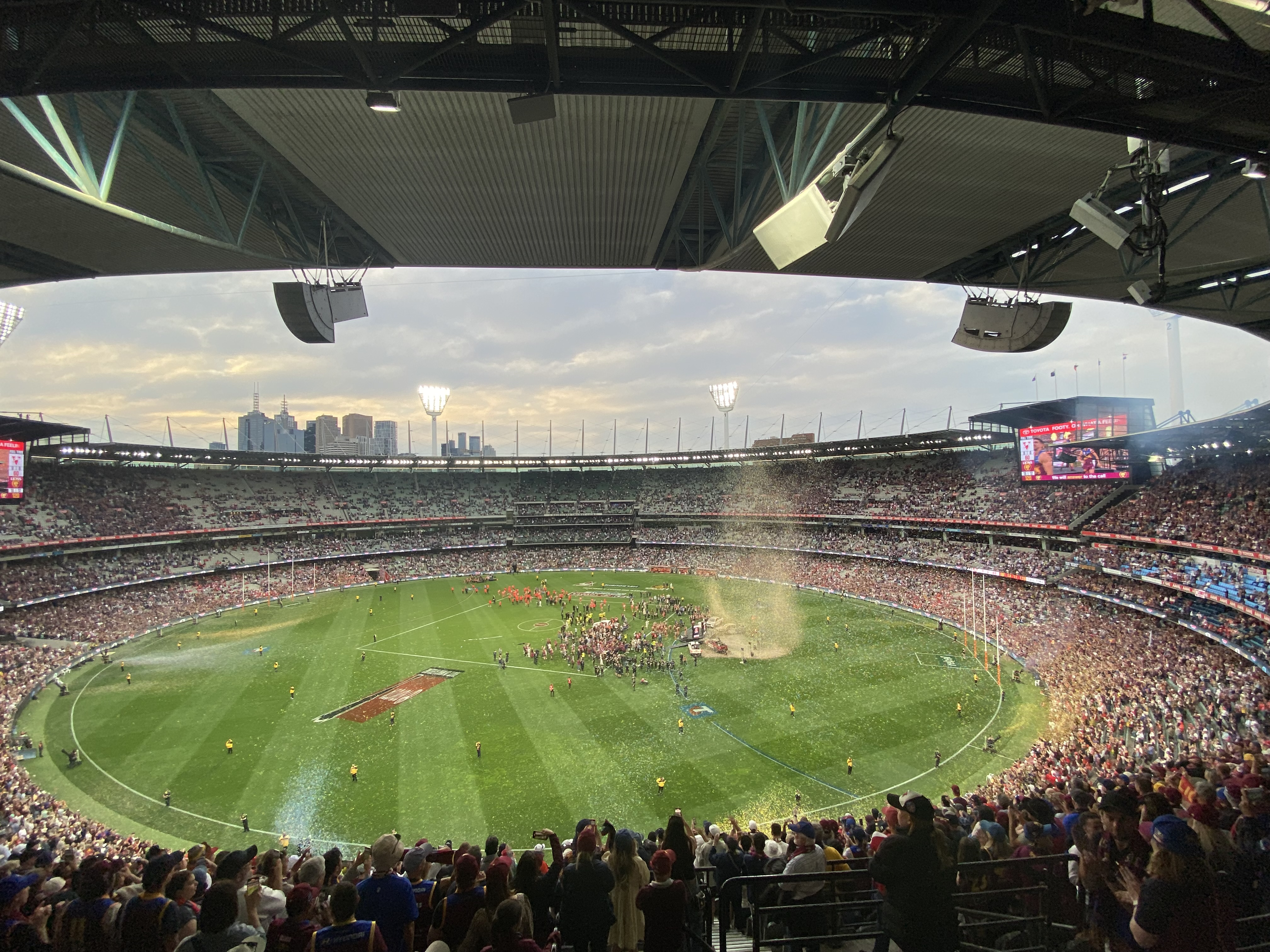
- On-field celebrations at the MCG

Sydney	Brisbane Lions
9.6 (60)	18.12 (120)
	1	2	3	4
SYD	3.1 (19)	4.3 (27)	5.4 (34)	9.6 (60)
BL	4.3 (27)	11.7 (73)	16.11 (107)	18.12 (120)
- Date: 28 September 2024
- Stadium: Melbourne Cricket Ground, Melbourne, Victoria, Australia
- Attendance: 100,013
- Favourite: Sydney
- Umpires: Matt Stevic, Simon Meredith, Craig Fleer, Nick Foot
- Coin toss won by: Brisbane Lions
- Kicked toward: Punt Road

Ceremonies
- Pre-match entertainment: Katy Perry, Tina Arena, Christine Anu & Mike Brady
- National anthem: Cody Simpson

Accolades
- Norm Smith Medallist: Will Ashcroft
- Jock McHale Medallist: Chris Fagan
- Ron Barassi Medallist: Lachie Neale, Harris Andrews

Broadcast in Australia
- Network: Seven Network

The 2024 AFL Grand Final was an Australian rules football match that was contested between the Sydney Swans and the Brisbane Lions at the Melbourne Cricket Ground on Saturday, 28 September 2024. It was the 129th annual grand final of the Australian Football League (AFL), staged to determine the premiers of the 2024 AFL season. The match was attended by 100,013 spectators. Brisbane won by a margin of 60 points, marking the club's fourth AFL premiership; it was their first premiership since 2003, and the first in a sequence of three consecutive premierships won between 2024 and 2026. Will Ashcroft of the Lions was awarded the Norm Smith Medal as the best player on the ground.

== Background ==
Sydney came into the 2024 season after a six-point elimination final loss to Carlton in 2023. They dominated the start of the season, at one stage having a win–loss record of 13–1. Although becoming somewhat less dominant in the second half of the year (which included a 112-point loss to Port Adelaide in round 21), they ultimately finished on top of the ladder with a 17–6 win–loss record to claim the minor premiership. They came from behind to defeat Greater Western Sydney by six points in the first qualifying final to progress to a preliminary final in which they defeated Port Adelaide by 36 points. Sydney's last grand final appearance was the 2022 AFL Grand Final, which they lost to Geelong by 81 points.

Brisbane came into the 2024 season after losing the 2023 Grand Final to Collingwood by four points. They struggled early, sitting with a win–loss record of 2–5 after seven games, before a strong second half to the year which saw them qualify for the finals with a 14–8–1 record, finishing fifth on the ladder. They beat Carlton by 28 points in the first elimination final to advance to the semi-finals, in which they came back from a 44-point deficit in the third quarter to defeat Greater Western Sydney by five points. In their preliminary final, they came back from a 25-point deficit in the third quarter to defeat Geelong by 10 points to advance to the grand final.

Sydney was aiming to win its sixth premiership, and its first since 2012, having lost its last three grand finals in 2014, 2016 and 2022. Brisbane was aiming to win its fourth premiership, and its first since winning three in a row in 2001, 2002 and 2003. It was the first grand final meeting between Sydney and Brisbane, though South Melbourne (who relocated to Sydney in 1982) and Fitzroy (who merged its AFL operations with the Brisbane Bears in 1996 to become the Brisbane Lions) did meet in the 1899 VFL grand final, which saw the latter prevail by one point. It was the first grand final since 2006 in which both teams competing were from outside of Victoria, and the first ever between two teams from states traditionally dominated by rugby league.

The two sides met once in the 2024 home-and-away season in which Brisbane 11.13 (79) defeated Sydney 11.11 (77) during round 19 at the Gabba. Sydney was the favourite among bookmakers, with odds of $1.73 for the win against Brisbane's $2.10.

The 2024 grand final was the first in which the Ron Barassi Medal was awarded. The award, named in honour of ten-time premiership player and coach Ron Barassi, Jr who had died in September 2023, was henceforth awarded to the captain or co-captains of the winning team.

== Entertainment ==
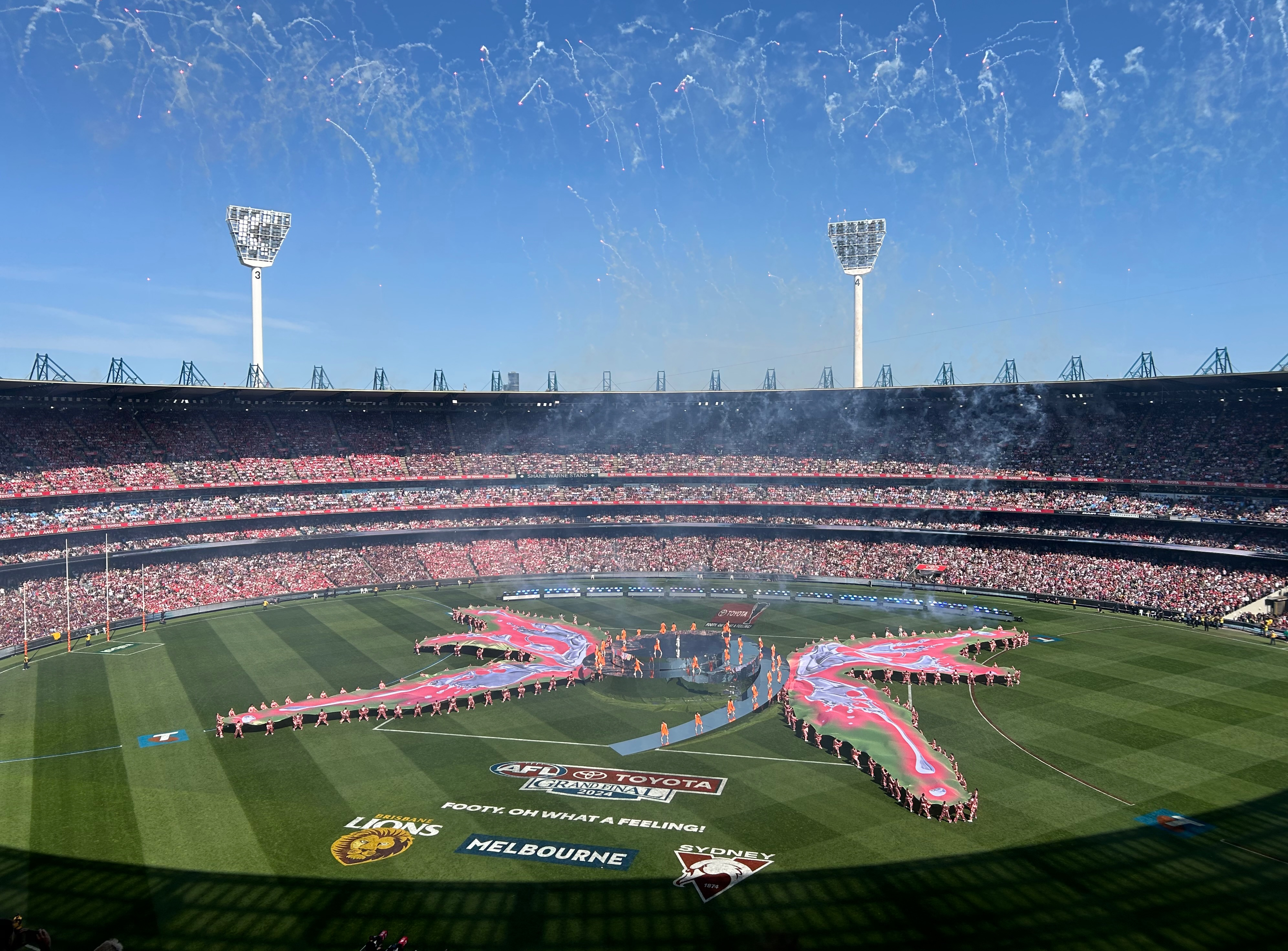
Katy Perry's performance at the MCG

US pop star Katy Perry performed a 17-minute set on-stage as the pre-game entertainment, singing a medley of "Roar", "Dark Horse", "Gorgeous", "California Gurls", "Teenage Dream", "I Kissed a Girl" (with Tina Arena), "Chains" (with Tina Arena), "Lifetimes", and "Firework". The pre-game entertainment was supported by 4× ARIA Award winner Christine Anu with her daughter Zipporah Corser-Anu for the First Nations Ceremony alongside the Songlines Youth Choir, and singer Mike Brady performed "Up There Cazaly". The national anthem was performed by Australian singer, actor and athlete Cody Simpson. The performance was greeted with a positive reception.

Scheduled on-field events
Time	Event
9:35 am	AFL Grand Final curtain-raiser: AFL Futures Match
12:38 pm	AFL Grand Final Sprint heats
1:30 pm	AFL Grand Final motorcade
1:33 pm	Mike Brady performs "Up There Cazaly"
1:40 pm	Katy Perry performs
2:13 pm	Teams enter the ground
2:24 pm	Delivery of the premiership cup by Josh J. Kennedy
2:25 pm	Welcome to Country—Wurundjeri Elder Uncle Colin Hunter Jr.
2:26 pm	The Australian National Anthem performed by Cody Simpson
2:30 pm	Game starts
Half time	AFL Grand Final Sprint final
Post game	Post game presentation

All times are in Australian Eastern Standard Time (GMT +10)

== Match summary ==
=== First quarter ===
Sydney opened the game slightly stronger than Brisbane. No goals were scored by either team in the first ten minutes until Will Hayward kicked the first for Sydney, and a Tom Papley goal followed soon after. Brisbane then kicked two quick goals, both from Kai Lohmann in the 16th and 17th minutes, to take a lead they did not relinquish for the remainder of the match. At this point, Sydney had enjoyed a territory advantage with nine inside-50s to five, but Brisbane had marked and converted more effectively in their forward line.

Three more goals followed, with Hugh McCluggage kicking a goal for the Lions in the 24th minute followed by goals from Sydney's James Rowbottom and Brisbane's Charlie Cameron in the final four minutes of the quarter.

Brisbane 4.3 (27) led Sydney 3.1 (19) by eight points at quarter time. Although scores were close, Brisbane had more control of general play, and had missed several very gettable shots at goal. Sydney was unable to stop Brisbane's short-passing ball movement game, with Sydney having less than 35% time in possession and Brisbane dominating the uncontested marks and handball receives statistics. Hugh McCluggage, with nine disposals and a goal, was the best on ground for the quarter; and forward Callum Ah Chee, although he had not scored, had been involved in setting up most of Brisbane's scoring chances.

=== Second quarter ===
Through the first ten minutes of the second quarter, both teams scored one goal: Lohmann kicked his third goal in the 6th minute, and Robbie Fox kicked a goal from a 50m penalty in the 8th minute.

From that point onwards, Brisbane took control of the quarter. Over the next five minutes, Brisbane kicked four behinds from gettable shots, before a run of six goals in only fifteen minutes: Joe Daniher kicked the first from a 30m set shot in the 16th minute; Daniher then set up the second, cleanly winning the subsequent centre bounce and kicking straight to Callum Ah Chee 40m from goal, who converted the set shot; Jarrod Berry kicked the third in the 22nd minute, after intercepting a hurried rebound and converting a 45m set shot; Eric Hipwood, kicked the fourth in the 24th minute with a drop punt kick from the forward pocket boundary line, after which he mimicked a memorable celebration which former Lion Jason Akermanis had done after kicking a similar goal in 2005; Ah Chee kicked the fifth in the 26th minute from a mark 15m from goal; and Logan Morris kicked the sixth in the 29th minute from a mark 20m from goal. Sydney at one stage went ten minutes without an inside-50, and at half time, Brisbane 11.7 (73) led Sydney 4.3 (27) by a commanding 46 points.

Through the twenty-minute purple patch to end the quarter, Brisbane dominated all statistical indicators, including: disposals 55–26; contested possessions 17–8; inside-50s 13–3; and clearances 7–2. Will Ashcroft had six disposals during this period through the midfield, while many of Sydney's midfield leaders had none.

=== Third quarter ===
Callum Ah Chee kicked a goal in the 9th minute to increase the Lions' lead, before an Isaac Heeney goal for the Swans in the 13th minute broke a sequence of seven consecutive Brisbane goals. Brisbane then continued to dominate for the rest of the quarter, with four more goals for Brisbane from Will Ashcroft, Cameron Rayner, Logan Morris and Ah Chee, extending the three-quarter time margin to an unassailable 73 points.

=== Final quarter ===
With Brisbane's premiership victory assured, the final quarter was played at a more leisurely pace. The Swans kicked four consolation goals, three coming from veteran midfielder Luke Parker in his last game for Sydney, and the other coming from Chad Warner. Brisbane kicked two final quarter goals: Lohmann at the 17th minute, and Daniher, in the final game before his retirement, in the 27th minute. The final margin was 60 points, Brisbane 18.12 (120) defeating Sydney 9.6 (60).

=== Overall ===
Brisbane dominated several key statistical indicators, including disposals (385–305) and tackles (64–45). Playing under its typical style of methodical ball movement and short passing, Brisbane outmarked Sydney 158–88 and was able to control the uncontested game and prevent Sydney from scoring heavily from turnover, an area in which Sydney was strongest in the league throughout the year. Although inside-50s were relatively even (Brisbane led 51–49), Brisbane's quality of entries was significantly higher, and Brisbane dominated the marks inside-50 statistic 22–9 across the whole game, after leading 14–2 in the decisive first half.

=== Norm Smith Medal ===
Brisbane Lions midfielder Will Ashcroft won the Norm Smith Medal as best on ground, scoring 14 out of a maximum 15 votes for his performance which included 30 disposals, 11 score involvements, and one goal. The son of triple premiership winning Brisbane player Marcus Ashcroft, Ashcroft was in only his second season and had missed the first half of the season recovering from an ACL injury; at 20 years old, he was the youngest Norm Smith Medallist since inaugural winner Wayne Harmes (Carlton) in 1979.

Midfielder Lachie Neale finished second with 35 disposals, including 18 contested, at 86% efficiency, and nine clearances. Forwards Callum Ah Chee (four goals, eleven score involvements) and Kai Lohmann (four goals, one goal assist) finished third and fourth respectively.

2024 Norm Smith Medal Voting Panel
Voting Panellist	3 Votes	2 Votes	1 Vote
Jack Riewoldt (Chair, Fox Footy)	Will Ashcroft (BL)	Callum Ah Chee (BL)	Lachie Neale (BL)
Riley Beveridge (AFL.com.au)	Lachie Neale (BL)	Will Ashcroft (BL)	Callum Ah Chee (BL)
Shaun Burgoyne (Channel 7)	Will Ashcroft (BL)	Lachie Neale (BL)	Callum Ah Chee (BL)
Anna Harrington (AAP)	Will Ashcroft (BL)	Lachie Neale (BL)	Callum Ah Chee (BL)
Rory Sloane (2024 retiree)	Will Ashcroft (BL)	Callum Ah Chee (BL)	Kai Lohmann (BL)

Leaderboard
Player	Team	Votes	Total
Will Ashcroft	Brisbane	3,2,3,3,3	14
Lachie Neale	Brisbane	1,3,2,2	8
Callum Ah Chee	Brisbane	2,1,1,1,2	7
Kai Lohmann	Brisbane	1	1

Other Brisbane players considered among the best were forward and back-up ruck Joe Daniher (two goals, four behinds), midfielders Hugh McCluggage (21 disposals, including nine in the first quarter) and Jarrod Berry (20 disposals), tagger Josh Dunkley (nullified star midfielder Isaac Heeney), and rebounding defenders Brandon Starcevich (six rebounds and nullified Tom Papley), Dayne Zorko (nine rebounds, seven intercepts) and Noah Answerth (four rebounds).

Few Sydney players were considered to have played good games, and only midfielders James Rowbottom (18 disposals, one goal) and Robbie Fox (21 disposals, one goal) received a grade higher than 7/10 when their performances were assessed by three major sportswriters.

=== Medal and cup presenters ===
2018 premiership player and former West Coast Eagles forward Josh Kennedy was the AFL premiership cup ambassador; he delivered the cup to Brisbane's premiership cup ambassador, Leigh Matthews, who coached the club to its three-peat from 2001 to 2003. Sydney had nominated a former club captain and 200-game player with the Swans, Stuart Maxfield. Four-time premiership coach David Parkin presented the Jock McHale Medal to winning coach Chris Fagan; the Norm Smith Medal was presented by three-time Geelong premiership player and 2007 winner Steve Johnson; and 1963 Geelong premiership captain Fred Wooller presented the inaugural Ron Barassi Medals to winning co-captains Lachie Neale and Harris Andrews.

== Teams ==
The teams were announced on Thursday, 26 September. Sydney made no changes to its preliminary final 23. Forward Logan McDonald was declared fit despite an ankle injury suffered in the preliminary final, although with just one first half kick before being substituted off with a recurrence of the injury, Sydney was ultimately criticised for selecting him. Sydney was also missing captain Callum Mills, who passed a fitness test but had been out of the team since a hamstring injury suffered at training in early September; Dane Rampe captained the team in his absence. Brisbane made one change to its preliminary final 23: ruckman Oscar McInerney was ruled out after twice dislocating his shoulder in the preliminary final, and he was replaced by journeyman ruckman Darcy Fort, playing only his third game of the season.

At age 63, Brisbane coach Chris Fagan became the oldest coach to win a grand final, (he later won further premierships at ages 64 and 65); and having played his entire senior career in the Tasmanian leagues, he became the first premiership coach never to have played a match in the VFL/AFL or (when it was the top Victorian league prior to 1897) VFA.

Sydney

Sydney
B:	24 Dane Rampe (c)	30 Tom McCartin	22 Nick Blakey
HB:	44 Jake Lloyd	7 Harry Cunningham	43 Lewis Melican
C:	17 James Jordon	1 Chad Warner	13 Oliver Florent
HF:	26 Luke Parker	6 Logan McDonald	21 Errol Gulden
F:	11 Tom Papley	36 Joel Amartey	9 Will Hayward
Foll:	4 Brodie Grundy	5 Isaac Heeney	8 James Rowbottom
Int:	34 Matthew Roberts	42 Robbie Fox	27 Justin McInerney
Int:	2 Hayden McLean	16 Braeden Campbell (sub)	
Coach:	John Longmire		

Brisbane

Brisbane Lions
B:	15 Dayne Zorko	31 Harris Andrews (c)	43 Noah Answerth
HB:	44 Darcy Wilmot	40 Jack Payne	35 Ryan Lester
C:	28 Jaspa Fletcher	8 Will Ashcroft	6 Hugh McCluggage
HF:	23 Charlie Cameron	3 Joe Daniher	7 Jarrod Berry
F:	16 Cameron Rayner	30 Eric Hipwood	33 Zac Bailey
Foll:	32 Darcy Fort	5 Josh Dunkley	9 Lachie Neale (c)
Int:	1 Kai Lohmann	4 Callum Ah Chee	13 Logan Morris
Int:	37 Brandon Starcevich	26 Conor McKenna (sub)	
Coach:	Chris Fagan		

=== Umpires ===
The umpiring panel, comprising four field umpires, four boundary umpires, two goal umpires and an emergency in each position, was announced on Wednesday, 25 September.

2024 AFL Grand Final umpiring panel
Position					Emergency
Field	2 Nick Foot (1)	9 Matt Stevic (12)	21 Simon Meredith (9)	26 Craig Fleer (2)	12 Andrew Stephens
Boundary	Matthew Tomkins (6)	Matthew Konetschka (6)	Michael Barlow (3)	Daniel Field-Read (1)	Damien Main
Goal	Matthew Dervan (3)	Sam Walsh (2)			Steven Piperno

Numbers in brackets represent the number of grand finals umpired, including 2024.

== Scoreboard ==
Grand final
Saturday, 28 September (2:30 pm)	Sydney	def. by	Brisbane Lions	Melbourne Cricket Ground (crowd: 100,013)	Report
3.1 (19); 4.3 (27); 5.4 (34); 9.6 (60)	Q1; Q2; Q3; Final	4.3 (27); 11.7 (73); 16.11 (107); 18.12 (120)	Umpires: Craig Fleer, Nick Foot, Simon Meredith, Matt Stevic; National anthem: Cody Simpson
Parker 3 Fox, Hayward, Heeney, Papley, Rowbottom, Warner 1	Goals	4 Ah Chee, Lohmann; 2 Daniher, Morris; 1 Ashcroft, Berry, Cameron, Hipwood, McCluggage, Rayner
Rowbottom, Florent, Fox, Gulden, Parker	Best	Neale, Ashcroft, Lohmann, Ah Chee, Daniher, McCluggage

== Media coverage ==
=== Television ===
Seven's coverage, simulcast on streaming service 7+, began at 9 am AEST with the Grand Final Brunch, hosted by Rebecca Maddern, followed by the Grand Final Countdown from 10:30 am with Luke Darcy. Pre-match coverage began from 12 pm with Hamish McLachlan and Bruce McAvaney hosting. The match was commentated by James Brayshaw, Brian Taylor, Luke Hodge, Matthew Richardson, Abbey Holmes and Dale Thomas. This was the final match before the new AFL television broadcast deal began, allowing all matches on the network to be streamed via 7+.

Fox Footy's coverage, simulcast on Kayo Sports, began at 9 am with the annual North Melbourne Grand Final Breakfast from the Plenary Hall at Melbourne Convention and Exhibition Centre. Fox Footy televised its own Grand Final Day coverage from the AFL Fan Festival in Yarra Park with their own talent, which, for the first time since 2020, did not include the annual Fox Footy Longest Kick due to a revitalisation project at Birrarung Marr on the banks of the Yarra River. Due to Seven's exclusive rights to the live broadcast, Fox Footy's coverage went dormant during the game, instead showing a full replay of Seven's match coverage broadcast at 6 pm AEST.

=== Radio ===
Radio broadcasters
Station	Region	Callers	Special Comments	Boundary Riders
Triple M	National	Mark Howard, Luke Darcy (Note: This was the final game for Darcy before his retirement from the AFL media.)	Jason Dunstall, Nathan Brown, Ash Chua (statistician)	Michael Roberts
ABC Radio	National	Corbin Middlemas, Clint Wheeldon	Mick Malthouse, Cameron Ling, Brett Deledio	Kelli Underwood
AFL Nation	National	Andy Maher, Matt Hill	Dermott Brereton, Brad Johnson	Matthew Cocks
NIRS	National	Barry Denner, Peter Cardamone	Darryl White, Robbie Ahmat	Sam Duncan
3AW (Note: 3AW's coverage was heard on 2GB in Sydney, 4BC in Brisbane and FiveAA in Adelaide.)	Melbourne, VIC	Anthony Hudson, Tim Lane	Matthew Lloyd, Jimmy Bartel	Jacqui Reed
SEN	Melbourne, VIC	Gerard Whateley, Dwayne Russell	Gerard Healy, Kane Cornes	Sam Edmund
K Rock	Geelong, VIC	Tom King, Ben Casanelia	Mark Neeld, Troy Selwood	Jason Doherty
6PR	Perth, WA	Adam Papalia, Karl Langdon	Brad Hardie, Mark Stone	Mark Foreman
