= Craig Fleer =

Australian rules football umpire

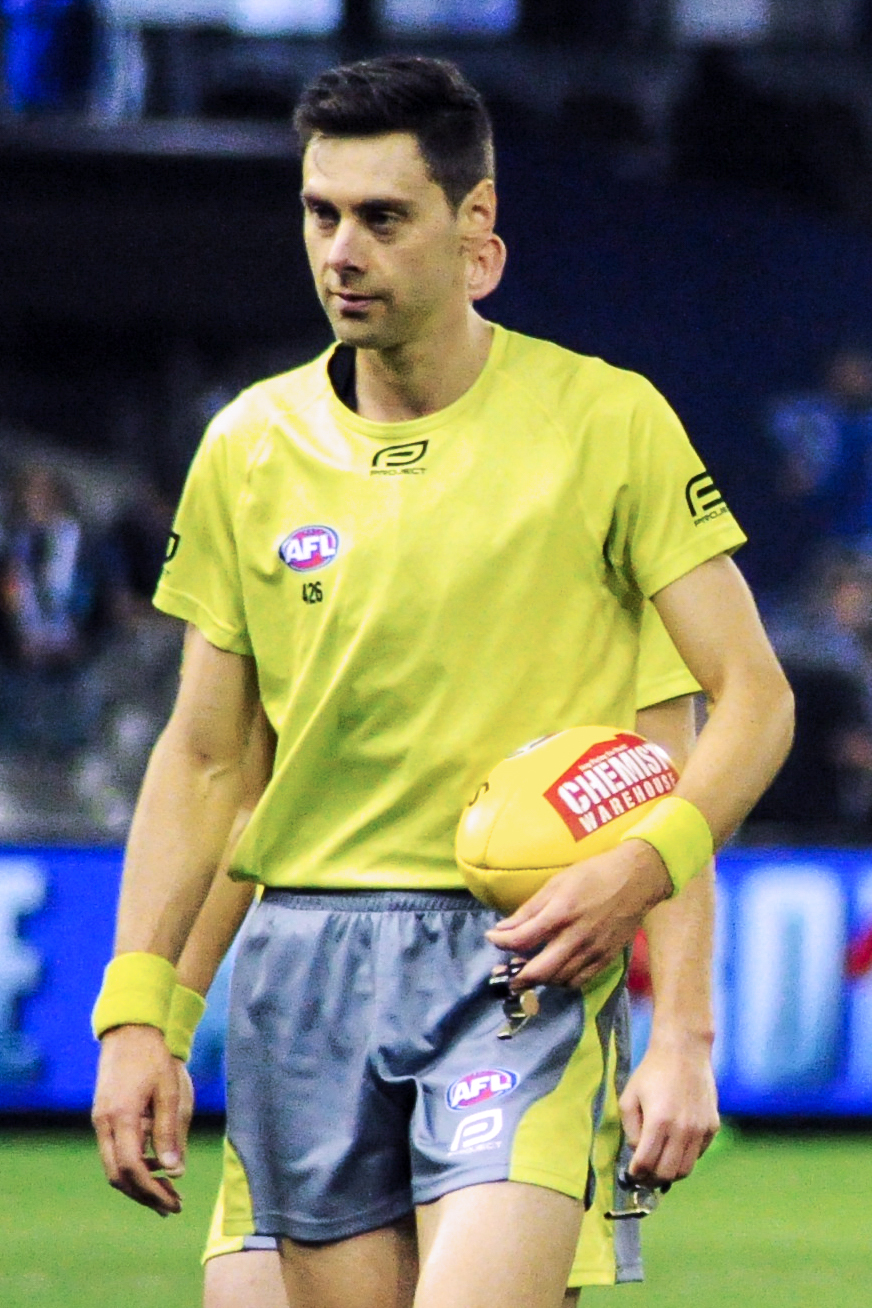
- Fleer in April 2018

Personal information
- Full name: Craig Fleer
- Nickname: Bonesy
- Height: 185 cm (6 ft 1 in)
- Weight: 70 kg (154 lb)
- Other occupation: Business management

Umpiring career
Years	League	Role	Games
2012–2014 2016–	AFL	Field umpire	227

Craig Fleer is an Australian rules football umpire currently officiating in the Australian Football League.

He joined the South Australian National Football League in 2004, umpiring in the 2015 Grand Final. He was appointed to the AFL list in 2012 and made his debut in Round 4 of that year, in a match between Melbourne and the Western Bulldogs. He left the AFL list at the end of the 2014 season, but returned in 2016.

In 2020, he was selected to umpire his first AFL Grand Final, and after an excellent season Fleer was selected to officiate the 2024 AFL Grand Final.
