= Noah Answerth =

Australian rules footballer

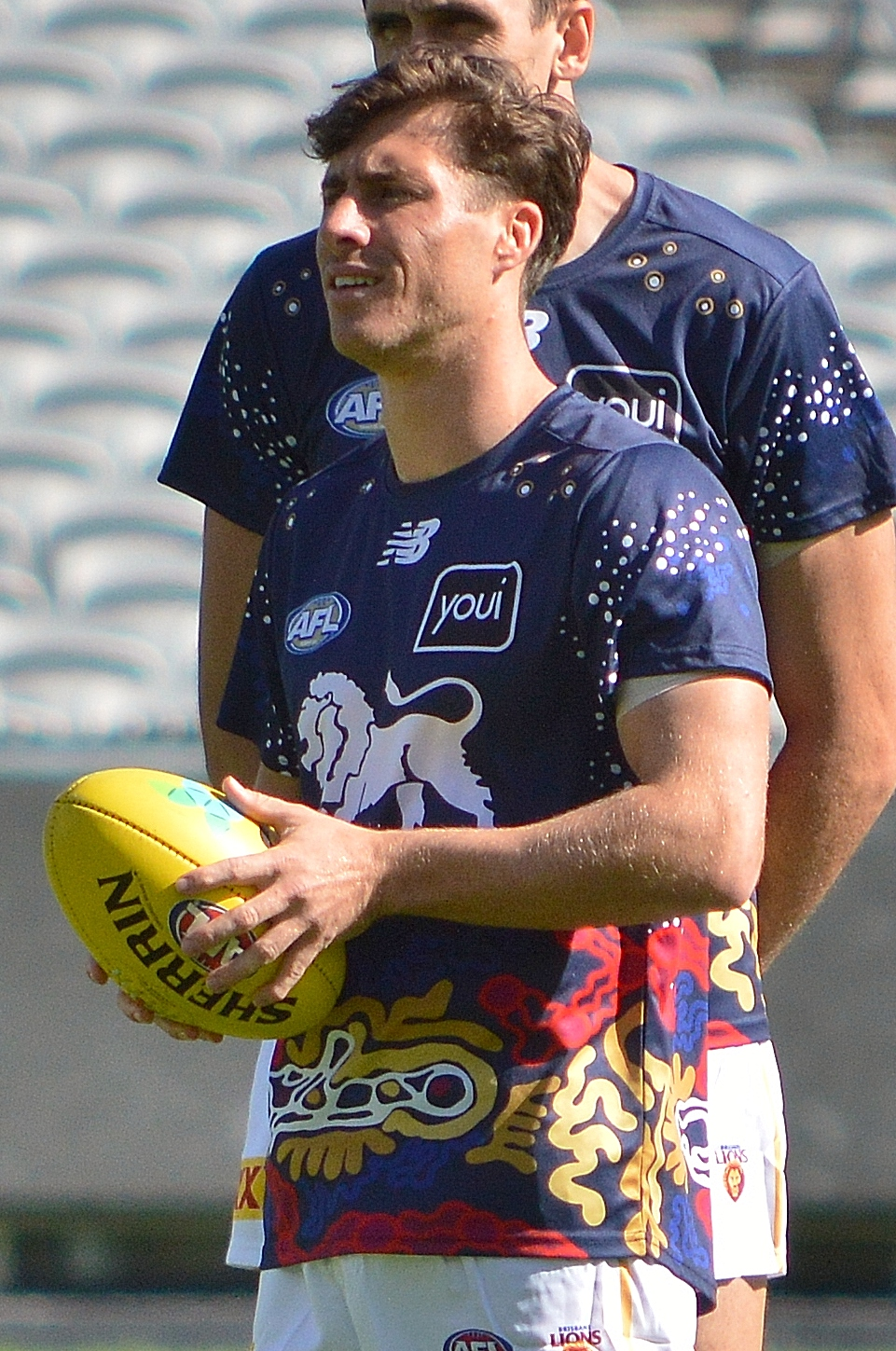
- Answerth playing for the Brisbane Lions in April 2025.

Personal information
- Full name: Noah Answerth
- Born: 6 August 1999 (age 27)
- Original team: Oakleigh Chargers (TAC Cup)
- Draft: No. 55, 2018 national draft
- Debut: Round 6, 2019, Brisbane Lions vs. Gold Coast, at Carrara Oval
- Height: 182 cm (6 ft 0 in)
- Weight: 82 kg (181 lb)
- Position: Defender

Club information
- Current club: Brisbane Lions
- Number: 43

Playing career^{1}
| Years | Club | Games (Goals) |
| 2019– | Brisbane Lions | 101 (3) |
- ^{1} Playing statistics correct to the end of round 22, 2026: AFL Rising Star nominee: 2019; AFL premiership player: 2024.

Noah Answerth (born 6 August 1999) is a professional Australian rules footballer playing for the Brisbane Lions in the Australian Football League (AFL).

== AFL career ==
Answerth was drafted by Brisbane with the 55th selection in the 2018 national draft. He made his debut in the win against Gold Coast at Carrara Oval in round six of the 2019 season. Answerth received a 2019 AFL Rising Star nomination in round 20 for his 18-disposal effort against the Western Bulldogs. Prior to being drafted he played for Oakleigh Chargers in the NAB League and his school Caulfield Grammar School.

Answerth was part of the Brisbane Lions 2024 premiership winning team, in a 60-point victory over the Sydney Swans.

== Statistics ==
Updated to the end of round 22, 2026.

Legend
| G | Goals | K | Kicks | D | Disposals | T | Tackles |
| B | Behinds | H | Handballs | M | Marks |

| Season | Team | No. | Games | Totals | | | | | | | Averages (per game) | | | | | | | Votes |
| Season | Team | No. | Games | G | B | K | H | D | M | T | G | B | K | H | D | M | T | Votes |
|---|---|---|---|---|---|---|---|---|---|---|---|---|---|---|---|---|---|---|
| 2019 | Brisbane Lions | 43 | 19 | 2 | 0 | 156 | 68 | 224 | 70 | 55 | 0.1 | 0.0 | 8.2 | 3.6 | 11.8 | 3.7 | 2.9 | 0 |
| 2020 (Note: The 2020 season was played with 17 home-and-away matches per team (down from 22) and 16-minute quarters with time on (down from 20-minute quarters with time on) due to the impact of the COVID-19 pandemic.) | Brisbane Lions | 43 | 9 | 0 | 0 | 71 | 24 | 95 | 25 | 17 | 0.0 | 0.0 | 7.9 | 2.7 | 10.6 | 2.8 | 1.9 | 0 |
| 2021 | Brisbane Lions | 43 | 0 | — | — | — | — | — | — | — | — | — | — | — | — | — | — | 0 |
| 2022 | Brisbane Lions | 43 | 23 | 0 | 0 | 221 | 102 | 323 | 111 | 60 | 0.0 | 0.0 | 9.6 | 4.4 | 14.0 | 4.8 | 2.6 | 0 |
| 2023 | Brisbane Lions | 43 | 4 | 0 | 0 | 18 | 14 | 32 | 10 | 11 | 0.0 | 0.0 | 4.5 | 3.5 | 8.0 | 2.5 | 2.8 | 0 |
| 2024^{#} | Brisbane Lions | 43 | 16 | 0 | 0 | 122 | 74 | 196 | 54 | 65 | 0.0 | 0.0 | 7.6 | 4.6 | 12.3 | 3.4 | 4.1 | 0 |
| 2025 | Brisbane Lions | 43 | 17 | 1 | 1 | 157 | 69 | 226 | 85 | 39 | 0.1 | 0.1 | 9.2 | 4.1 | 13.3 | 5.0 | 2.3 | 0 |
| 2026 | Brisbane Lions | 43 | 13 | 0 | 0 | 118 | 41 | 159 | 63 | 23 | 0.0 | 0.0 | 9.1 | 3.2 | 12.2 | 4.8 | 1.8 | 0 |
| Career | | | 101 | 3 | 1 | 863 | 392 | 1255 | 418 | 270 | 0.0 | 0.0 | 8.5 | 3.9 | 12.4 | 4.1 | 2.7 | 0 |

== Honours and achievements ==
Team

- AFL premiership player: 2024

Individual

- AFL Rising Star nominee: 2019
