= Darcy Wilmot =

Australian rules footballer (born 2003)

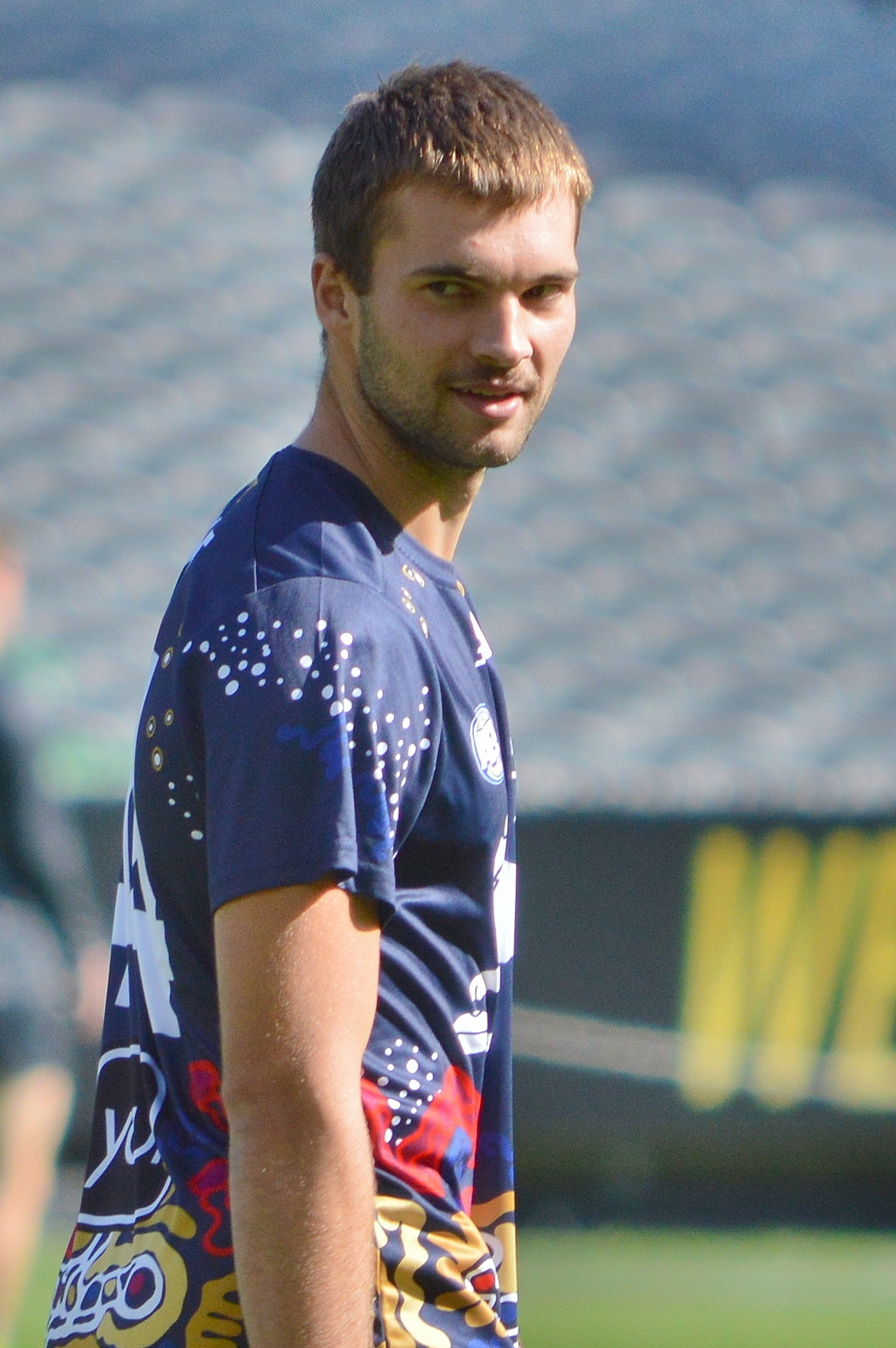
- Wilmot in April 2025

Personal information
- Born: 31 December 2003 (age 22)
- Original team: Northern Knights (TAC Cup)
- Draft: No. 16, 2021 national draft
- Debut: Elimination final, 2022, Brisbane Lions vs. Richmond, at The Gabba
- Height: 183 cm (6 ft 0 in)
- Weight: 79 kg (174 lb)

Club information
- Current club: Brisbane Lions
- Number: 44

Playing career^{1}
Years	Club	Games (Goals)
2022–	Brisbane Lions	104 (13)
- ^{1} Playing statistics correct to the end of round 22, 2026.

Career highlights
- 3× AFL premiership player: 2024, 2025, 2026; AFL Rising Star nominee: 2023; 3× 22under22 team: 2024, 2025, 2026; Signature

Darcy Wilmot (born 31 December 2003) is a professional Australian rules football player who plays for the Brisbane Lions in the Australian Football League (AFL).

== Early career ==
He started playing junior football with his local junior club, Yarrambat, Yarrambat is in the northern suburbs of Melbourne. He was invited to try out with the Northern Knights in the (then) NAB League.

Wilmot was the Brisbane Lions' first pick in the 2021 AFL draft.

== AFL career ==
He played his first AFL match on 1 September 2022, in the 2022 second elimination final. He kicked a goal on debut.

Wilmot received a nomination for the Rising Star after round 14 of the 2023 season. His teammate Will Ashcroft’s was nominated in Round 2. Wilmot managed to play every game for the season culminating in a Grand final selection.

Wilmot was part of the Brisbane Lions 2024 premiership winning team, in a 60 point victory over the Sydney Swans.

== Personal life ==
Wilmot's father Grant Wilmot played five games for Collingwood in 1980.

== Statistics ==
Updated to the end of round 22, 2026.

Legend
G	Goals	K	Kicks	D	Disposals	T	Tackles
B	Behinds	H	Handballs	M	Marks
#	Played in that season's premiership team

Season	Team	No.	Games	Totals							Averages (per game)							Votes
Season	Team	No.	Games	G	B	K	H	D	M	T	G	B	K	H	D	M	T	Votes
2022	Brisbane Lions	44	3	1	0	23	15	38	6	10	0.3	0.0	7.7	5.0	12.7	2.0	3.3	0
2023	Brisbane Lions	44	26	5	4	297	109	406	107	43	0.2	0.2	11.4	4.2	15.6	4.1	1.7	0
2024^{#}	Brisbane Lions	44	27	0	3	370	164	534	133	46	0.0	0.1	13.7	6.1	19.8	4.9	1.7	0
2025^{#}	Brisbane Lions	44	27	6	2	373	176	549	160	56	0.2	0.1	13.8	6.5	20.3	5.9	2.1	3
2026^{#}	Brisbane Lions	44	21	1	1	349	108	457	142	37	0.0	0.0	16.6	5.1	21.8	6.8	1.8	0
Career			104	13	10	1412	572	1984	548	192	0.1	0.1	13.6	5.5	19.1	5.3	1.8	3

== Honours and achievements ==
Team

- 3× AFL premiership player: 2024, 2025, 2026

Individual

  - AFL Rising Star nominee: 2023 (round 14)
  - 3× 22under22 team: 2024, 2025, 2026
