= Shadeau Brain =

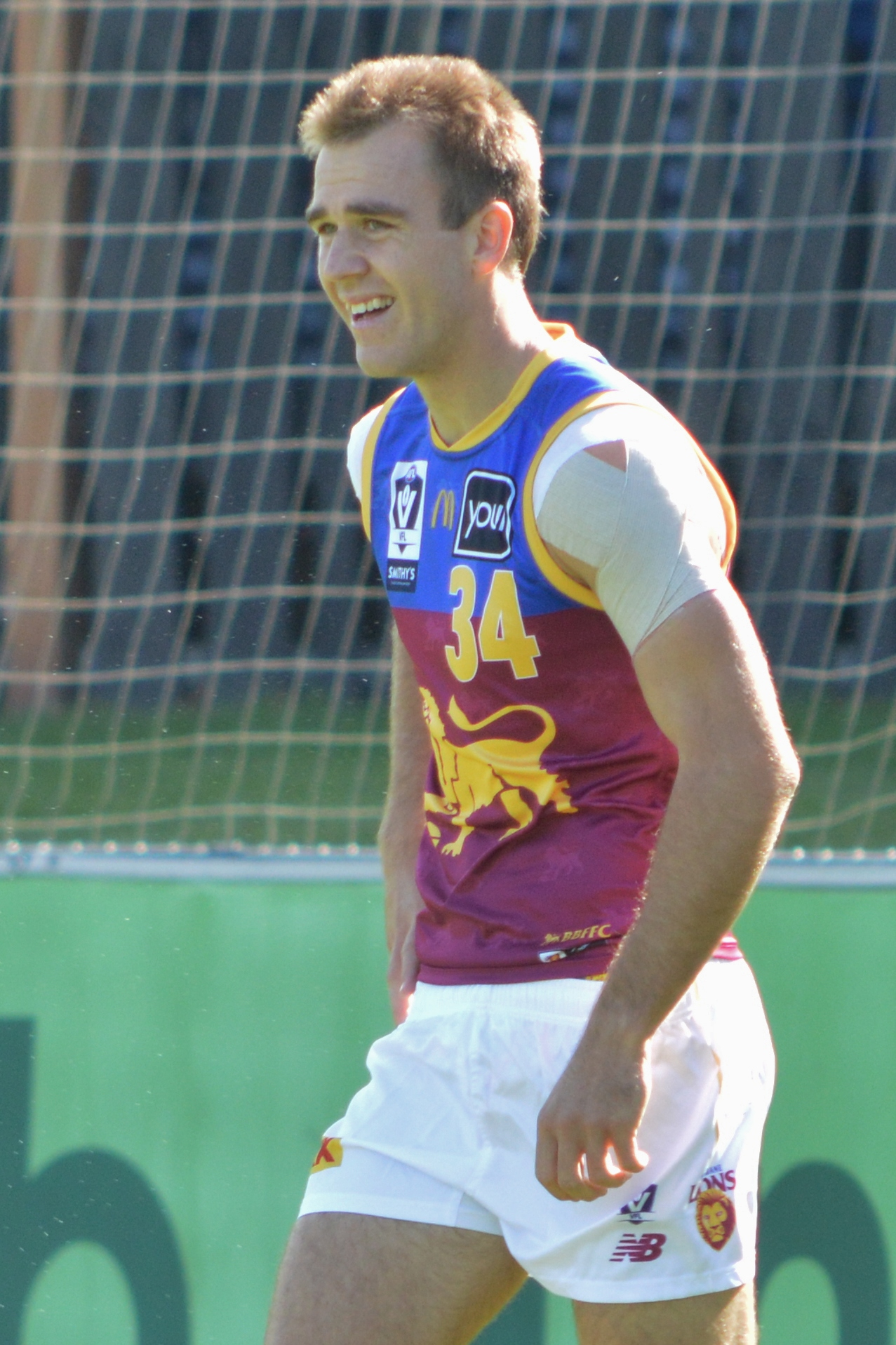
- Brain in April 2025

Personal information
- Full name: Shadeau Brain
- Born: 13 February 2004 (age 22)
- Original team: Noosa Tigers
- Debut: 12 May 2024, Brisbane Lions vs. Adelaide, at Adelaide Oval
- Height: 183 cm (6 ft 0 in)
- Position: Medium defender

Club information
- Current club: Brisbane Lions
- Number: 34

Playing career^{1}
| Years | Club | Games (Goals) |
| 2024– | Brisbane Lions | 11 (0) |
- ^{1} Playing statistics correct to the end of round 22, 2026.

Shadeau Brain (pron. "Shadow", born 13 February 2004) is an Australian rules footballer who currently plays for the Brisbane Lions in the Australian Football League (AFL).

== Early life ==
Brain grew up in Noosa and attended Tewantin State School and Sunshine Beach State High School. He later moved to Finley, New South Wales, where his father was from, and attended Finley High School.

== Football career ==
At the age of 16, Brain returned to the Sunshine Coast, where he joined the Noosa Tigers.

=== Brisbane Lions ===
Brain made his debut in the Victorian Football League (VFL) for Brisbane's reserves team against Gold Coast in round 18 of the 2022 season. He played two more games against Richmond and Werribee.

He was formally drafted to Brisbane on 30 November 2022 in the 2023 rookie draft as a Category B rookie.

In 2023, Brain did not play any AFL games, however he continued to play in the VFL for Brisbane. In round 13 of the 2023 season, he kicked a career-best 4 goals against Sydney.

Brain made his AFL debut against Adelaide in round 9 of the 2024 season.

== Personal life ==
Brain has 12 siblings, including seven brothers who also play Australian rules football.

== Statistics ==
Updated to the end of round 22, 2026.

Legend
| G | Goals | K | Kicks | D | Disposals | T | Tackles |
| B | Behinds | H | Handballs | M | Marks |

| Season | Team | No. | Games | Totals | | | | | | | Averages (per game) | | | | | | | Votes |
| Season | Team | No. | Games | G | B | K | H | D | M | T | G | B | K | H | D | M | T | Votes |
|---|---|---|---|---|---|---|---|---|---|---|---|---|---|---|---|---|---|---|
| 2024 | Brisbane Lions | 34 | 9 | 0 | 0 | 52 | 37 | 89 | 31 | 5 | 0.0 | 0.0 | 5.8 | 4.1 | 9.9 | 3.4 | 0.6 | 0 |
| 2025 | Brisbane Lions | 34 | 0 | — | — | — | — | — | — | — | — | — | — | — | — | — | — | 0 |
| 2026 | Brisbane Lions | 34 | 2 | 0 | 0 | 22 | 7 | 29 | 10 | 0 | 0.0 | 0.0 | 11.0 | 3.5 | 14.5 | 5.0 | 0.0 | 0 |
| Career | | | 11 | 0 | 0 | 74 | 44 | 118 | 41 | 5 | 0.0 | 0.0 | 6.7 | 4.0 | 10.7 | 3.7 | 0.5 | 0 |
