= Darcy Fort =

Australian rules footballer (born 1993)

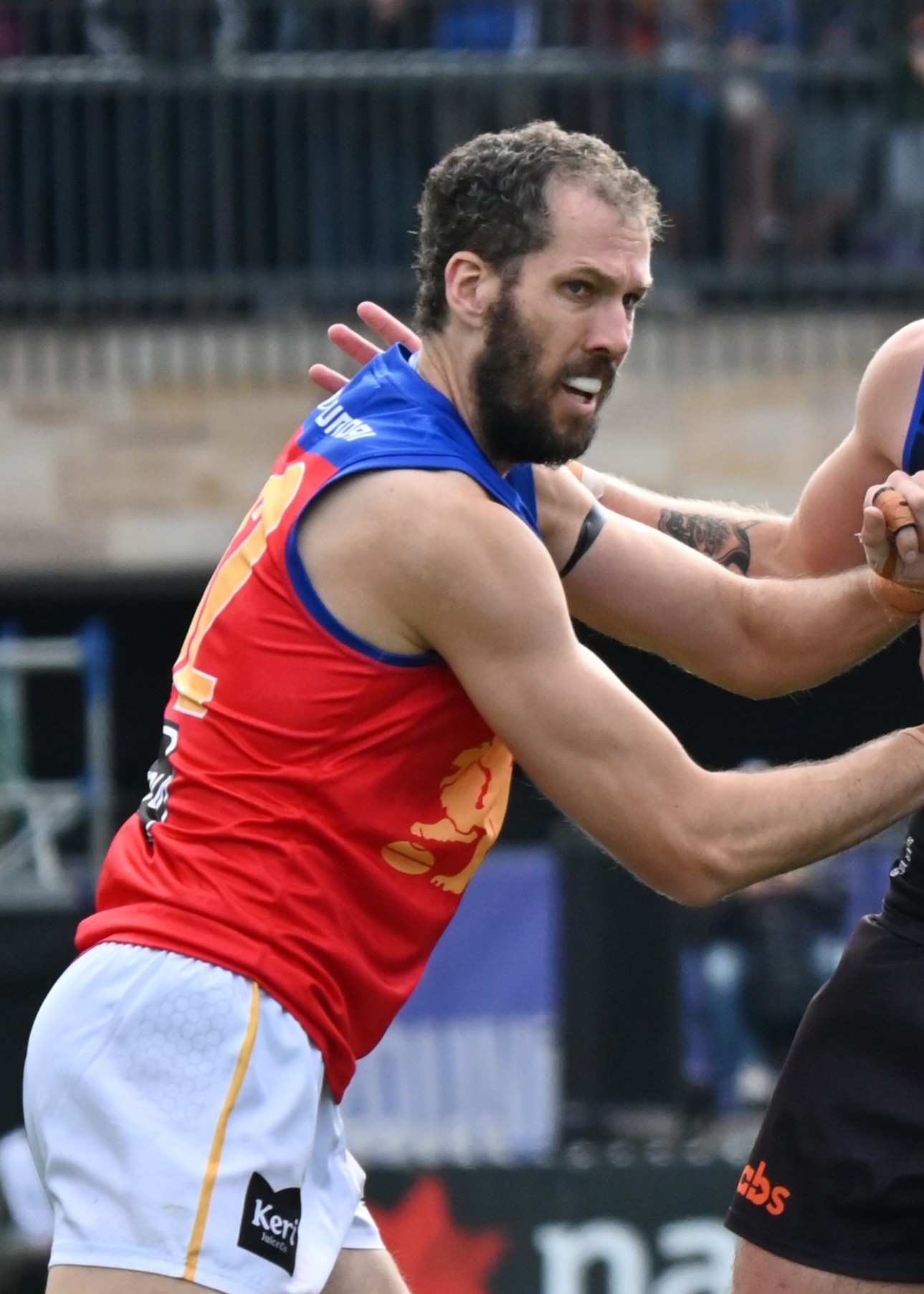
- Fort in April 2026

Personal information
- Born: 6 August 1993 (age 33)
- Original team: South Barwon (GFL)/Central District(SANFL)
- Draft: No. 65, 2018 national draft
- Debut: Round 9, 2019, Geelong vs. Western Bulldogs, at GMHBA Stadium
- Height: 204 cm (6 ft 8 in)
- Weight: 99 kg (218 lb)
- Position: Ruckman

Club information
- Current club: Brisbane Lions
- Number: 32

Playing career^{1}
Years	Club	Games (Goals)
2019–2021	Geelong	8 (6)
2022–	Brisbane Lions	75 (23)
Total		83 (29)
- ^{1} Playing statistics correct to the end of the 2026 season.

Career highlights
- 3× AFL premiership player: 2024, 2025, 2026; Signature

Darcy Fort (born 6 August 1993) is an Australian rules footballer playing for the Brisbane Lions in the Australian Football League (AFL). A 2.04-metre ruckman who can also play as a key forward, he played in several state leagues before being drafted by Geelong as a mature-age recruit. He made his AFL debut in round 9 of the 2019 season. Fort is a 3 x AFL Premiership player.

== Junior and state-league career ==
From Geelong, Victoria, Fort originally played for South Barwon as a junior and represented the Geelong Falcons in the TAC Cup. Ahead of the 2012 AFL draft he was little-noticed by recruiters until a match with South Barwon in the Geelong Football League, when he rucked competitively against Brad Ottens, a triple-premiership player for Geelong, despite his size and experience deficit. Over his 10 TAC Cup matches for the season, Fort averaged 10 disposals, 3.5 marks, 26 hitouts and 3.4 tackles; the Herald Sun reported that he was regarded as among the best ruckmen in the competition, highlighted Fort's tackling, tenacity and follow-up effort as strengths, and predicted he would be drafted in the late second or early third round (pick 40–50).

Fort was nevertheless overlooked at the 2012 draft (a snub the Geelong Advertiser called "inexplicable") and entered a stint in the Victorian Football League (VFL) with Werribee. He played four matches of the 2013 season before moving to Footscray. Fort played eleven matches and kicked eight goals over the next two years, then switched to South Australian National Football League club Central District ahead of the 2016 season. At this point, he was playing as a ruckman with stints as a key defender.

Over the next three years, Fort kicked 29 goals in 52 games as he began to take on a forward-line role. Fox Sports claimed he "might be the best mature-age ruck prospect in Australia" after he averaged 31.5 hitouts for Central District in 2018; journalist Callum Twomey also highlighted Fort as a possible selection in the 2018 AFL draft.

== AFL career ==
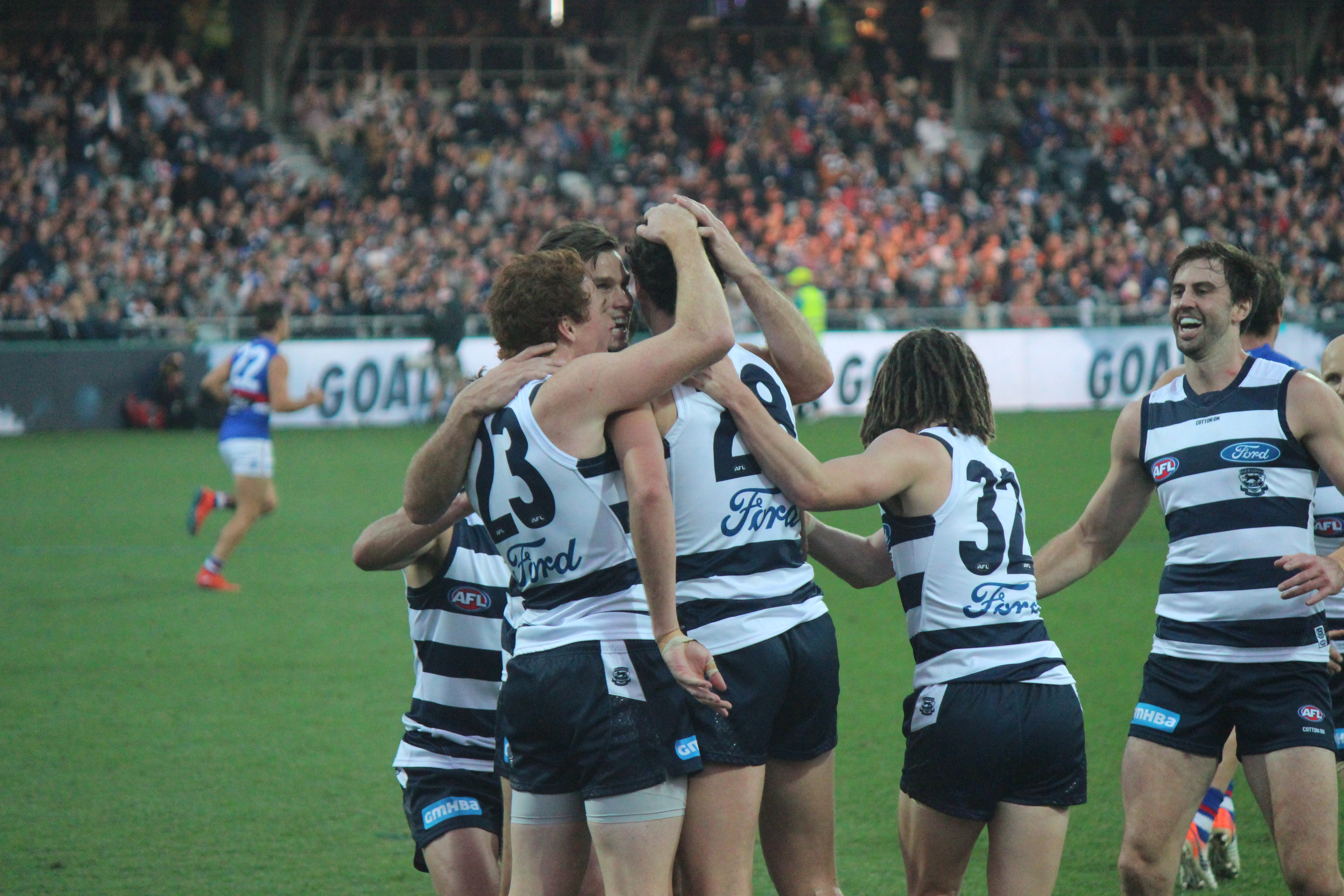
Fort (centre) is hugged by teammates Gary Rohan, Tom Hawkins and Gryan Miers after kicking his first AFL goal.

Fort was drafted by Geelong with pick 65 in the 2018 national draft, quitting his job as a civil engineer to play for the club. He followed Orren Stephenson (2011) and Ryan Abbott (2016) as mature-age ruckmen selected by the club. Fort began his time with Geelong competing with Abbott, Rhys Stanley and Zac Smith for the ruckman position. The proliferation of ruckmen led to him spending more time as a key forward in Geelong's VFL reserves, where he kicked eight goals in four matches and displayed strong marking ability while rucking alongside Abbott. After Stanley withdrew late from Geelong's round 9 match against the Western Bulldogs, Fort replaced him for his first AFL match. He notched 17 hitouts and kicked three goals in combination with Abbott. He played two more matches to complete the 2019 season.

Fort was traded to the Brisbane Lions at the conclusion of the 2021 AFL season.

Due to first choice ruckman Oscar McInerney's injuries sustained in the preliminary final win against Geelong, Fort was part of the Brisbane Lions 2024 premiership winning team, brought into the team for the Grand Final.

In May of 2025 Fort signed on with Brisbane until 2026. Later that year, Fort was part of Brisbane's 2025 premiership side. In 2026, Fort won his third consecutive premiership.

== Statistics ==
Updated to the end of the 2026 season.

Legend
G	Goals	K	Kicks	D	Disposals	T	Tackles
B	Behinds	H	Handballs	M	Marks	H/O	Hit-outs
#	Played in that season's premiership team

Season	Team	No.	Games	Totals								Averages (per game)								Votes
Season	Team	No.	Games	G	B	K	H	D	M	T	H/O	G	B	K	H	D	M	T	H/O	Votes
2019	Geelong	28	3	5	0	16	7	23	6	5	37	1.7	0.0	5.3	2.3	7.7	2.0	1.7	12.3	0
2020 (Note: The 2020 season was played with 17 home-and-away matches per team (down from 22) and 16-minute quarters with time on (down from 20-minute quarters with time on) due to the impact of the COVID-19 pandemic.)	Geelong	28	5	1	0	31	16	47	9	9	106	0.2	0.0	6.2	3.2	9.4	1.8	1.8	21.2	0
2021	Geelong	28	0	—	—	—	—	—	—	—	—	—	—	—	—	—	—	—	—	0
2022	Brisbane Lions	32	18	9	1	127	49	176	31	37	306	0.5	0.1	7.1	2.7	9.8	1.7	2.1	17.0	0
2023	Brisbane Lions	32	7	1	3	37	22	59	12	11	90	0.1	0.4	5.3	3.1	8.4	1.7	1.6	12.9	0
2024^{#}	Brisbane Lions	32	3	1	2	22	11	33	7	11	59	0.3	0.7	7.3	3.7	11.0	2.3	3.7	19.7	0
2025^{#}	Brisbane Lions	32	21	4	5	127	87	214	39	66	622	0.2	0.2	6.0	4.1	10.2	1.9	3.1	29.6	0
2026^{#}	Brisbane Lions	32	26	8	3	173	107	280	78	38	400	0.3	0.1	6.7	4.1	10.8	3.0	1.5	15.4	0
Career			83	29	14	533	299	832	182	177	1620	0.3	0.2	6.4	3.6	10.0	2.2	2.1	19.5	0

== Honours and achievements ==
Team

- AFL premiership player: 2024, 2025, 2026
