= Josh Dunkley =

Australian rules footballer

- Dunkley pre-match with the Brisbane Lions in 2025

Personal information
- Full name: Joshua Dunkley
- Born: 9 January 1997 (age 29); Sydney, New South Wales, Australia
- Original team: Gippsland Power (TAC Cup)
- Draft: No. 25, 2015 national draft
- Height: 191 cm (6 ft 3 in)
- Weight: 91 kg (201 lb)
- Position: Midfielder

Club information
- Current club: Brisbane Lions
- Number: 5

Playing career^{1}
Years	Club	Games (Goals)
2016–2022	Western Bulldogs	116 (65)
2023–	Brisbane Lions	105 (19)
Total		221 (84)
- ^{1} Playing statistics correct to the end of the 2026 season.

Career highlights
- 4× AFL premiership player: 2016, 2024, 2025, 2026 (c); Brisbane Lions co-captain: 2026–; Charles Sutton Medal: 2022; Merrett–Murray Medal: 2025; Robert Rose Award: 2025; Robert Walls Medal: 2025; AFL Rising Star nominee: 2016

Joshua Dunkley (born 9 January 1997) is a professional Australian rules footballer playing for the Brisbane Lions in the Australian Football League (AFL). He previously played for the Western Bulldogs from 2016 to 2022. Dunkley is a four-time premiership player; he played in one in his debut season with the Bulldogs in 2016, which broke a 62-year drought for the club, and three consecutively with the Lions from 2024 to 2026. He won the Charles Sutton Medal with the Bulldogs in 2022 and the Merrett–Murray Medal with the Lions, along with the Robert Rose Award, in 2025. Dunkley has served as Brisbane Lions co-captain since 2026.

== Early life ==
Dunkley was born in Sydney, the second of three children to footballer Andrew and his wife Lisa. After Andrew retired from AFL football in 2002, the family returned south to country Victoria and lived on a farm near Yarram in the Gippsland region. Dunkley participated in the Auskick program at Yarram. During his time playing for Gippsland Power, Dunkley developed into a promising leader (being the team captain in his final year), and his strong overhead marking skills, along with his ability to win the contested ball, had many comparing him to Luke Parker. He also spent time with the Sydney Swans' youth academy and played six games for Richmond's VFL team in 2015. In the lead-up to the 2015 AFL draft, Dunkley attracted keen interest from a number of clubs, especially his father's former club Sydney, but when the Western Bulldogs bid for Dunkley with the 25th selection, Sydney chose not to match the bid. After losing players like Nick Malceski and Adam Goodes, the club were looking for players with strong kicking skills and although Dunkley was under serious consideration, it was felt that his kicking skills needed improvement. He thus became the first player under the new father–son drafting rules to have a draft bid placed on him which was not matched by his father's former club.

He graduated from Gippsland Grammar School in 2014 and spent 2015 working at the school as a teacher's assistant prior to being drafted.

== AFL career ==
Dunkley made his AFL debut in round 1, 2016, against Fremantle. He scored his first AFL goal in that match. After his performance against North Melbourne in round 20 where he recorded nineteen disposals, four tackles, three clearances, and three inside-50s, he was the round nomination for the Rising Star. Dunkley would then go on to play in the club's finals campaign, kicking two goals in a 47-point win over West Coast in the elimination final in Perth. The following week against Hawthorn in the semi-final, Dunkley kicked a goal in the second quarter and gathered 23 possessions in a 23-point win. In the preliminary final win against Greater Western Sydney, Dunkley again recorded over 20 possessions, and in the grand final, he gathered 15 disposals and seven tackles. At 19, he was the youngest player in the premiership side.

Following a best-and-fairest season for the Bulldogs in 2022, Dunkley requested to be traded to the Brisbane Lions. He was traded on the final day of trade period.

Dunkley was part of the Lions' 2024 premiership-winning team. In 2025, he helped the Lions win back-to-back premierships to become a three-time premiership player. Then, in 2026, as Brisbane Lions co-Captain, winning his fourth premiership.

== Statistics ==
Updated to the end of round 22, 2026.

Legend
G	Goals	K	Kicks	D	Disposals	T	Tackles
B	Behinds	H	Handballs	M	Marks
#	Played in that season's premiership team

Season	Team	No.	Games	Totals							Averages (per game)							Votes
Season	Team	No.	Games	G	B	K	H	D	M	T	G	B	K	H	D	M	T	Votes
2016^{#}	Western Bulldogs	20	17	9	12	152	136	288	76	98	0.5	0.7	8.9	8.0	16.9	4.5	5.8	0
2017	Western Bulldogs	20	7	5	7	47	39	86	25	29	0.7	1.0	6.7	5.6	12.3	3.6	4.1	0
2018	Western Bulldogs	5	19	11	15	193	223	416	93	113	0.6	0.8	10.2	11.7	21.9	4.9	5.9	4
2019	Western Bulldogs	5	23	11	8	307	344	651	95	141	0.5	0.3	13.3	15.0	28.3	4.1	6.1	15
2020 (Note: The 2020 season was played with 17 home-and-away matches per team (down from 22) and 16-minute quarters with time on (down from 20-minute quarters with time on) due to the impact of the COVID-19 pandemic.)	Western Bulldogs	5	12	6	5	84	134	218	28	71	0.5	0.4	7.0	11.2	18.2	2.3	5.9	4
2021	Western Bulldogs	5	15	5	8	129	220	349	56	78	0.3	0.5	8.6	14.7	23.3	3.7	5.2	3
2022	Western Bulldogs	5	23	18	11	272	312	584	142	140	0.8	0.5	11.8	13.6	25.4	6.2	6.1	14
2023	Brisbane Lions	5	24	2	7	261	321	582	120	165	0.1	0.3	10.9	13.4	24.3	5.0	6.9	4
2024^{#}	Brisbane Lions	5	27	6	6	335	348	683	150	167	0.2	0.2	12.4	12.9	25.3	5.6	6.2	11
2025^{#}	Brisbane Lions	5	27	7	8	318	345	663	125	218	0.3	0.3	11.8	12.8	24.6	4.6	8.1	7
2026^{#}	Brisbane Lions	5	21	3	6	214	223	437	102	140	0.1	0.3	10.2	10.6	20.8	4.9	6.7	0
Career			215	83	93	2312	2645	4957	1012	1360	0.4	0.4	10.8	12.3	23.1	4.7	6.3	62

== Honours and achievements ==
Team

- AFL premiership player (Western Bulldogs): 2016
- 3× AFL premiership player (Brisbane Lions): 2024, 2025, 2026 (c)
- McClelland Trophy (Brisbane Lions): 2025

Individual

- Brisbane Lions co-captain: 2026–present
- Charles Sutton Medal: 2022
- Merrett–Murray Medal: 2025
- Robert Rose Award: 2025
- AFL Rising Star nominee: 2016

== Personal life ==
In 2020, Dunkley was introduced to Australian netballer Tippah Dwan through his sister, netballer Lara Dunkley, and the pair have since maintained a high‑profile presence across the AFL and Super Netball communities, frequently noted for supporting each other's careers during interstate moves and competitive seasons; the couple announced their engagement on 1 January 2026, sharing the news on social media.
