= Will Ashcroft =

Australian rules footballer (born 2004)

- Ashcroft playing for the Brisbane Lions in 2025

Personal information
- Full name: Will Ashcroft
- Nicknames: The Prince, Mr September
- Born: 6 May 2004 (age 22); Gold Coast, Queensland
- Original team: Sandringham Dragons (NAB League)
- Draft: No. 2 (F/S), 2022 national draft
- Debut: Round 1, 2023, Brisbane Lions vs. Port Adelaide, at Adelaide Oval
- Height: 182 cm (6 ft 0 in)
- Weight: 78 kg (172 lb)
- Position: Midfielder

Club information
- Current club: Brisbane Lions
- Number: 8

Playing career^{1}
Years	Club	Games (Goals)
2023–	Brisbane Lions	85 (43)
- ^{1} Playing statistics correct to the end of the 2026 season.

Career highlights
- 3× AFL premiership player: 2024, 2025, 2026; 2× Norm Smith Medal: 2024, 2025; 2× Gary Ayres Award: 2025, 2026; Merrett–Murray Medal: 2026; 2× Marcus Ashcroft Medal: 2025 (game 1), 2026 (game 2); Goal of the Year: 2023; AFL Rising Star nominee: 2023; 3× 22under22 team: 2023, 2025, 2026 (vc)

Will Ashcroft (born 6 May 2004) is an Australian rules footballer playing for the Brisbane Lions Football Club in the Australian Football League (AFL). He was taken as pick number 2 in the 2022 AFL draft, under the father–son rule.

Ashcroft is a three time premiership player, winning three consecutive premierships in 2024, 2025 and 2026. He is a two-time Norm Smith Medallist (2024, 2025), two-time Gary Ayres Award winner (2025, 2026) and one-time Merrett–Murray Medal winner (2026).

The son of Marcus Ashcroft, a three-time AFL premiership player, Ashcroft's talent as a footballer was identified by the Gold Coast Suns Football Club at the age of ten. He played for various teams in Queensland as a child, before moving to Melbourne in 2019 at the age of 15 where he commenced playing for the Sandringham Dragons. During his time with the Sandringham Dragons, Ashcroft was promoted to captain and received the Larke Medal for best player at the national championships.

== Early life ==
Ashcroft was born on 6 May 2004 on the Gold Coast, to parents Rebekah and Marcus Ashcroft. He has two siblings, one of whom is fellow professional footballer Levi Ashcroft.

Ashcroft attended All Saints Anglican School for most of his youth. His father Marcus Ashcroft, is a three-time AFL premiership player who competed in 318 games for the Brisbane Bears/Lions over the course of his 15-year professional career. His great uncle is former Melbourne Demons player John Townsend, who was part of their 1964 premiership team.

Ashcroft played a variety of sports while growing up on the Gold Coast and was selected to represent Queensland in swimming as well as athletics before focusing on Australian rules football. He played junior football from a young age, and was at 10 years old selected by the Gold Coast Suns to take part in their academy program.

Ashcroft has stated that his personal training standards were inspired by Gary Ablett Jr. and Touk Miller. At 11 years of age, he switched clubs and began playing for Southport in the under-14s Gold Coast AFL competition. Several years later he represented Queensland at the 2018 U15 AFL National Championships, where his performances earned him All-Australian honours as a bottom-ager. He was also awarded the Gold Coast Suns under-14s Academy Player of the Year award after the 2018 season where he played alongside future AFL players Jed Walter, Ethan Read, Jake Rogers and Will Graham. Ashcroft relocated to Melbourne in 2019 where he began attending Brighton Grammar and once again competed in the U15 AFL National Championships, although this time he would captain Victoria to an undefeated gold medal performance.

Ashcroft temporarily moved back to Queensland in 2020 to play in the QAFL junior league for Morningside during the COVID-19 pandemic-affected year which cancelled all junior football competitions within Victoria. In 2021, after moving back to Victoria, Ashcroft was deemed a top draft prospect after performing well for Victoria Metro in the U17 National Championships. Despite spending most of his childhood on the Gold Coast and five years in the Suns academy, the AFL ruled in April 2021 that Ashcroft was ineligible to be academy-drafted by the Gold Coast Suns.

In 2022, Ashcroft captained the Sandringham Dragons to a NAB League premiership and Victoria Metro to an U18 National Championship, later receiving the captaincy honour in the U18 All-Australian team as well as the Larke Medal. After finishing his Victorian Certificate of Education at Brighton Grammar toward the end of 2021, he began studying commerce and sport management at Deakin University.

== AFL career ==
Ashcroft was nominated as a father–son selection for the Brisbane Lions in the 2022 AFL draft, and was accepted as Pick 2 after the Lions matched North Melbourne's bid. He agreed to a five-year deal with the Lions.

Ashcroft made his AFL debut in Round 1 of the 2023 season against Port Adelaide, gathering 13 disposals and a goal in a 54-point defeat. In Round 2, Ashcroft collected 31 disposals against Melbourne and received a Rising Star nomination as one of the best players on the ground. In Round 19, Ashcroft ruptured his ACL against the Geelong Cats, ending his debut season prematurely and therefore missing the 2023 finals series. Ashcroft was nominated for and won the Goal of the Year, announced at the 2023 Brownlow Medal. He finished the year with 10 Brownlow votes, the third-most for the Lions, finishing behind Joe Daniher with 12, and Lachie Neale, who won the award with 31. He was also selected in the 2023 22under22 team.

Ashcroft returned from his ACL injury mid-way through the 2024 season, returning against Melbourne in Round 16 and playing a crucial role in the Lions' mid-season resurgence that saw them bounce back from a below-average season start to make finals with a fifth-place finish. Ashcroft would be instrumental in the Lions' finals run, and was part of the 2024 premiership-winning team, winning the Norm Smith Medal as best afield in the Grand Final with 30 disposals and a goal. At 20 years of age, Ashcroft became the youngest Norm Smith Medal winner since 1979, when Wayne Harmes won the inaugural edition of the award. He also became the first Queenslander to win the Norm Smith Medal.

On 4 May 2025, Brisbane defeated the Gold Coast Suns in QClash 28, winning 9.12 (66) to 7.7 (49). Ashcroft accumulated 34 disposals, 17 contested possessions and 9 clearances to be awarded the Marcus Ashcroft Medal as the best on ground. The medal is named after his father, due to his contributions to both clubs. On 19 August, Ashcroft received his second 22under22 selection, being selected in the 2025 team. Later that year, Ashcroft was nominated for the Goal of the Year for a second time. For the second year running, Ashcroft was key to the Lions' finals run, winning a second premiership in a row in the 2025 Grand Final, this time enjoying premiership success alongside his brother Levi. Ashcroft won the Norm Smith Medal for the second year in a row, becoming one of only five players to win the medal multiple times and one of only three players to win it two years in a row. He became the youngest dual Norm Smith medallist in VFL/AFL history. Ashcroft also won the 2025 Gary Ayres Award, awarded to the best player across the finals series.

In December 2025, the AFL confirmed Ashcroft's State of Origin eligibility would be tied to Queensland after missing out on selection for the 2026 AFL Origin match.

For the 2026 AFL season, Ashcroft was appointed as a member of the Lions' leadership group alongside seven other players. In Round 23, Ashcroft won a second Marcus Ashcroft Medal in QClash 32, accumulating 31 disposals, 1 goal and 4 clearances; it was his ninth game in a row with 30+ disposals. Ashcroft was selected in the 2026 22under22 team, his third selection, and was this time selected as vice-captain of the team. Ashcroft was selected in the 46-man All-Australian squad for the 2026 season, his first career nomination, but was ultimately omitted from the final team.

Ashcroft won a third consecutive premiership with the Lions in 2026, and was crucial to the Lions' victory yet again, finishing third in the Norm Smith Medal, with multiple commentators opining that he deserved to win the medal for a third time. With the Lions down 17 points in time on, Ashcroft was instrumental in their miracle victory, collecting 6 disposals and 4 clearances in that short time frame to complete the Lions' comeback, directly contributing to 3 of their last 4 goals.

Ashcroft won the Gary Ayres Award for the second consecutive year, becoming only the second player to win the award multiple times alongside Dustin Martin. He also claimed the 2026 Merrett–Murray Medal as the Lions Best & Fairest player.

== Statistics ==
Updated to the end of grand final, 2026.

Legend
G	Goals	K	Kicks	D	Disposals	T	Tackles
B	Behinds	H	Handballs	M	Marks
#	Played in that season's premiership team

Season	Team	No.	Games	Totals							Averages (per game)							Votes
Season	Team	No.	Games	G	B	K	H	D	M	T	G	B	K	H	D	M	T	Votes
2023	Brisbane Lions	8	18	8	6	200	198	398	61	63	0.4	0.3	11.1	11.0	22.1	3.4	3.5	10
2024^{#}	Brisbane Lions	8	13	3	8	166	131	297	67	33	0.2	0.6	12.8	10.1	22.8	5.2	2.5	0
2025^{#}	Brisbane Lions	8	27	15	13	369	364	733	114	95	0.6	0.5	13.7	13.5	27.1	4.2	3.5	11
2026^{#}	Brisbane Lions	8	27	17	19	457	413	771	131	91	0.6	0.7	16.9	11.6	28.6	4.9	3.4	27
Career			85	43	46	1192	1007	2199	373	282	0.5	0.5	14.0	11.9	25.9	4.4	3.3	48

== Honours and achievements ==
Team

- 3× AFL premiership player: 2024, 2025, 2026
- McClelland Trophy/Club Championship: 2025

Individual

- 2× Norm Smith Medal: 2024, 2025
- 2× AFLCA Gary Ayres Award: 2025, 2026
- 2× Marcus Ashcroft Medal: R8 2025, R23 2026
- Larke Medal: 2022
- AFL Goal of the Year: 2023
- AFL Rising Star nominee: 2023 (round 2)
- 3× 22under22 team: 2023, 2025, 2026 (vc)
- Merrett–Murray Medal: 2026
