= Jack Payne (Australian rules footballer) =

Australian rules footballer

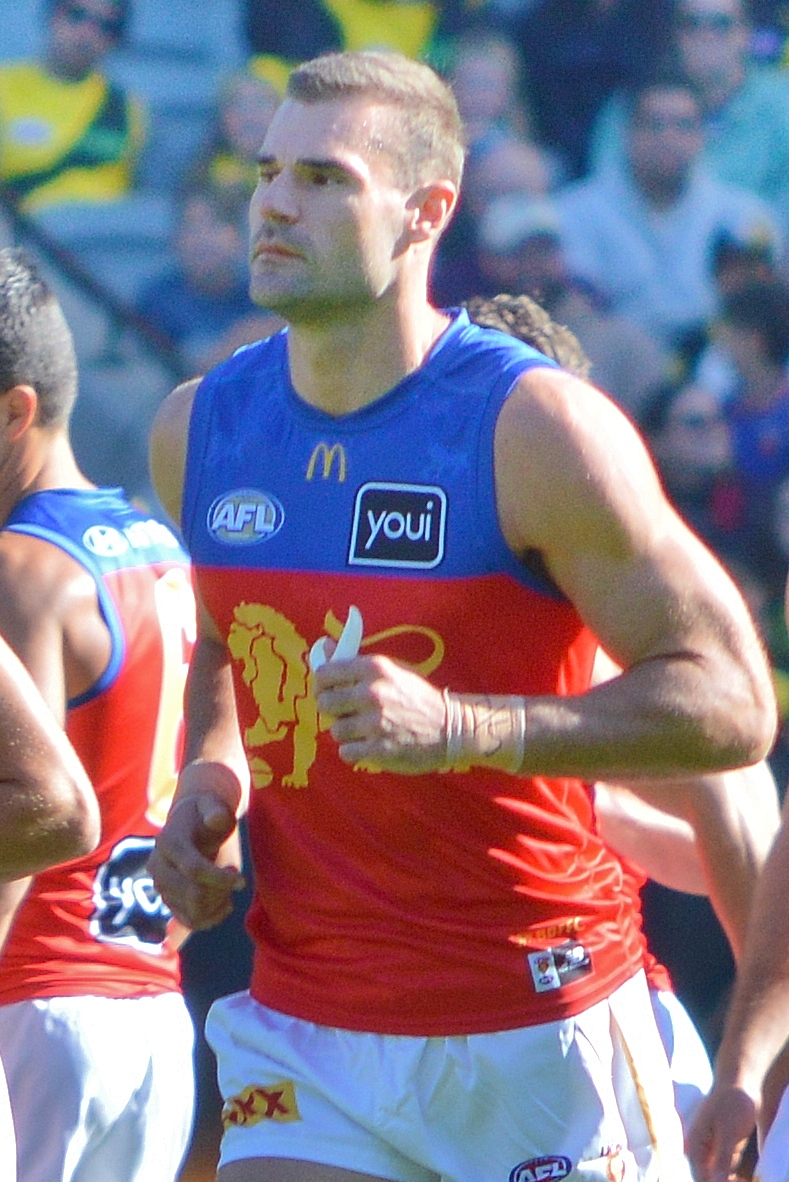
- Payne in April 2025

Personal information
- Full name: Jack Parker Payne
- Born: 15 October 1999 (age 27); Sunshine Coast, Queensland
- Original team: Noosa AFC(QFA)/Brisbane Lions(NEAFL)
- Draft: No. 54, 2017 AFL draft, Brisbane Lions
- Debut: 4 August 2020, Brisbane Lions vs. Richmond, at Carrara Stadium
- Height: 197 cm (6 ft 6 in)
- Weight: 101 kg (223 lb)
- Position: Defender

Club information
- Current club: Brisbane Lions
- Number: 40

Playing career^{1}
Years	Club	Games (Goals)
2018–	Brisbane Lions	81 (2)
- ^{1} Playing statistics correct to the end of the 2025 season.

Career highlights
- AFL premiership player: 2024

Jack Parker Payne (born 15 October 1999) is an Australian rules footballer who plays for the Brisbane Lions in the Australian Football League (AFL). He was recruited by the Brisbane Lions with the 54th draft pick in the 2017 AFL draft.

== Early life ==
Payne was born and raised on the Sunshine Coast where he attended St Andrews Anglican College throughout his upbringing. He played junior football for Noosa AFC in the local Sunshine Coast AFL juniors league. At the age of 13, Payne was selected to join the Brisbane Lions Academy after a talent scout caught notice of him playing school football. He was also originally a promising discus thrower, representing Australia at the Oceanic Games. However, at the age of 17 he gave up this opportunity to pursue a career in the AFL instead. In 2017, Payne represented the Allies in the AFL Under-18 Championships, where he played two games and averaged 9.5 disposals per match.

== AFL career ==
Payne played 18 games for the Brisbane Lions in the North East Australian Football League (NEAFL) in 2019, but was unable to break into the side. Payne made his AFL debut in the Lions' 41-point loss to Richmond in the 10th round of the 2020 AFL season. On debut, Payne collected 9 disposals, took 5 marks and spent 80% of the game on the ground.

Payne was part of the Brisbane Lions 2024 premiership winning team, in a 60-point victory over the Sydney Swans.

== Statistics ==
Updated to the end of the 2025 season.

Legend
G	Goals	K	Kicks	D	Disposals	T	Tackles
B	Behinds	H	Handballs	M	Marks

Season	Team	No.	Games	Totals							Averages (per game)							Votes
Season	Team	No.	Games	G	B	K	H	D	M	T	G	B	K	H	D	M	T	Votes
2018	Brisbane Lions	40	0	—	—	—	—	—	—	—	—	—	—	—	—	—	—	0
2019	Brisbane Lions	40	0	—	—	—	—	—	—	—	—	—	—	—	—	—	—	0
2020 (Note: The 2020 season was played with 17 home-and-away matches per team (down from 22) and 16-minute quarters with time on (down from 20-minute quarters with time on) due to the impact of the COVID-19 pandemic.)	Brisbane Lions	40	5	0	0	28	11	39	20	4	0.0	0.0	5.6	2.2	7.8	4.0	0.8	0
2021	Brisbane Lions	40	10	0	0	73	46	119	49	16	0.0	0.0	7.3	4.6	11.9	4.9	1.6	0
2022	Brisbane Lions	40	12	2	3	104	28	132	65	21	0.2	0.3	8.7	2.3	11.0	5.4	1.8	0
2023	Brisbane Lions	40	23	0	0	177	48	225	124	20	0.0	0.0	7.7	2.1	9.8	5.4	0.9	0
2024^{#}	Brisbane Lions	40	18	0	0	143	39	182	101	24	0.0	0.0	7.9	2.2	10.1	5.6	1.3	0
2025	Brisbane Lions	40	13	0	0	109	42	151	78	17	0.0	0.0	8.4	3.2	11.6	6.0	1.3	1
Career			81	2	3	634	214	848	437	102	0.0	0.0	7.8	2.6	10.5	5.4	1.3	1

== Honours and achievements ==
Team

- AFL premiership player: 2024
