= Callum Ah Chee =

Australian rules footballer

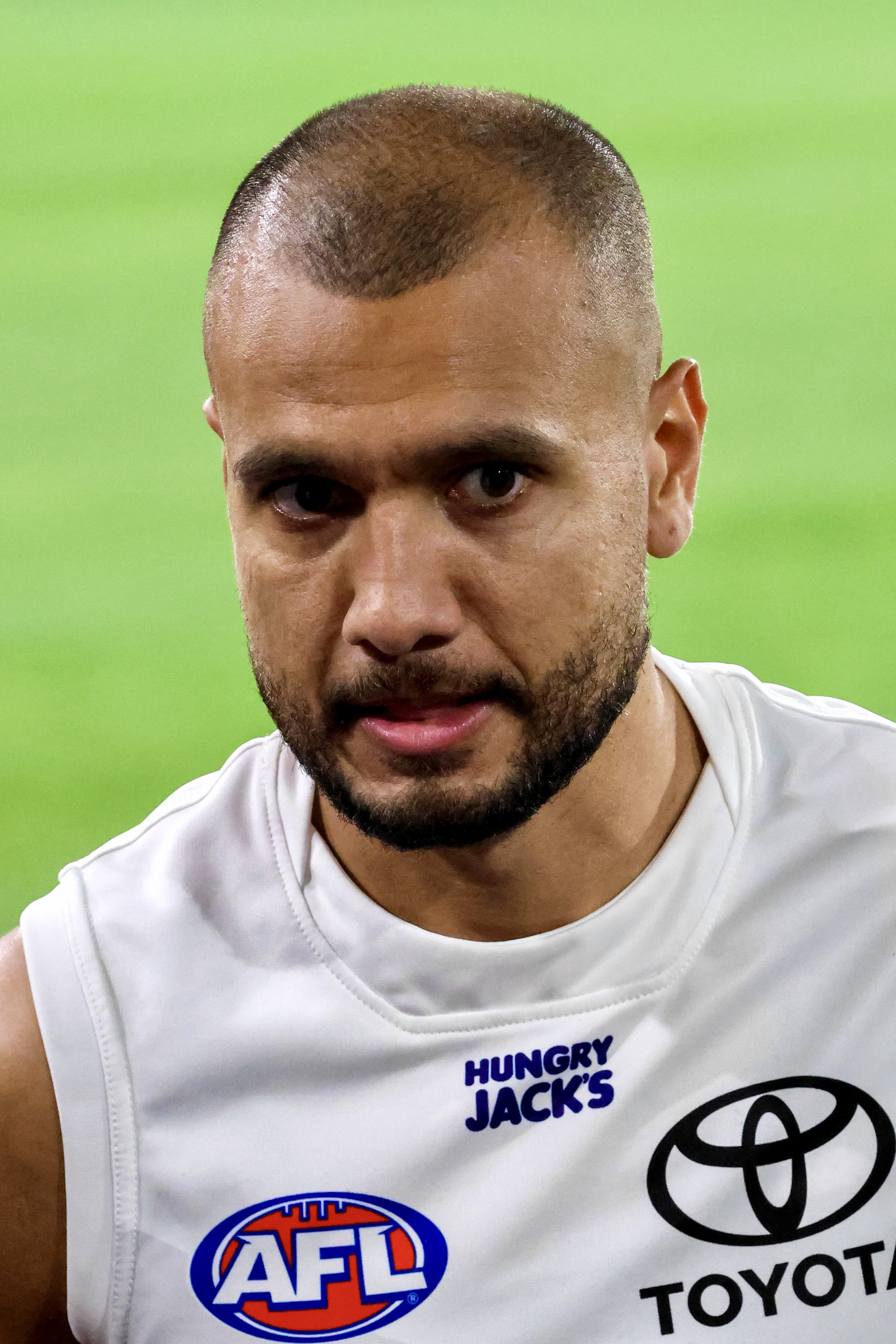
- Ah Chee with Adelaide in July 2026

Personal information
- Full name: Callum Ah Chee
- Born: 9 October 1997 (age 29); Derby, Western Australia, Australia
- Original teams: Kelmscott Junior Football Club; South Fremantle (WAFL)
- Draft: No. 8, 2015 national draft
- Height: 182 cm (6 ft 0 in)
- Weight: 78 kg (172 lb)
- Position: Forward / midfielder

Club information
- Current club: Adelaide
- Number: 4

Playing career^{1}
Years	Club	Games (Goals)
2016–2019	Gold Coast	45 (24)
2020–2025	Brisbane Lions	124 (75)
2026–	Adelaide	9 (9)
Total		177 (106)

Representative team honours^{2}
Years	Team	Games (Goals)
2025	Indigenous All-Stars	1 (0)
2026	Western Australia	1 (0)
- ^{1} Playing statistics correct to the end of the 2026 season.^{2} Representative statistics correct as of 2026.

Career highlights
- 2× AFL premiership player: 2024, 2025 Signature

Callum Ah Chee (born 9 October 1997) is an Australian rules footballer who plays as a forward for the Adelaide Crows in the Australian Football League (AFL). He previously played for the Gold Coast Suns from 2016 to 2019, and the Brisbane Lions from 2020 to 2025.

Ah Chee is a two-time premiership player with the Brisbane Lions (2024, 2025). He was initially drafted by the Gold Coast Suns with the eighth overall pick in the 2015 national draft.

== Early life ==
Ah Chee was born in Derby, Western Australia, and is the youngest of three brothers, including Brendon Ah Chee, who also played in the AFL for the West Coast Eagles and Port Adelaide. Ah Chee's heritage includes Nyikina, Yawuru and Chinese from his father's side and Nyoongar and Dutch heritage from his mother's side.

His family relocated to the southeast Perth suburb of Armadale when he was three years old. Ah Chee played basketball in his youth before taking up Australian rules football for the Kelmscott Junior Football Club. He played for South Fremantle in the Western Australian Football League (WAFL), making his debut for the club at 17 years old in 2014.

He represented Western Australia at the Under 18 Championships in both 2014 and 2015.

== AFL career ==
=== Gold Coast Suns (2016–2019) ===
Ah Chee was drafted by the Gold Coast Suns with their first selection and eighth overall in the 2015 national draft. Ah Chee's time at the Suns was hampered by injuries and inconsistent form, limiting to only 45 games across four seasons. He played 16 of those games in his debut season in 2016 and showed flashes of brilliance, mainly as a half-forward and winger. He struggled to maintain a permanent spot in the starting team over the following three years.

=== Brisbane Lions (2020–2025) ===
He was traded to Brisbane at the end of the 2019 AFL season. The move proved to be a pivotal point in his career, establishing himself as a versatile and reliable member of the Lions' team, playing 124 games and played roles in the forward line, midfield and half-back.

After being substituted out of the 2023 Grand Final, amassing only six disposals, Ah Chee was a key contributor to the Lions' 2024 premiership campaign. He was shifted to a primarily forward role mid-way through the season, and he delivered a strong finals campaign, kicking a total of ten goals during the finals series. He kicked four goals in the 2024 Grand Final victory over the Sydney Swans and finished third in the Norm Smith Medal voting.

Ah Chee was selected in the Indigenous All-Stars team which defeated Fremantle in the 2025 pre-season. He became a two-time premiership player when the Lions defeated Geelong in the 2025 Grand Final. Following the 2025 premiership, Ah Chee requested a move back to a club closer to his family's roots. Although a trade could not be completed with the Adelaide Crows during the official trade period, he nominated for the 2025 pre-season draft.

=== Adelaide Crows (2026–) ===
The Adelaide Crows selected Ah Chee with the first pick of the pre-season draft, giving him a long-term contract. The move saw Ah Chee join the club he supported in his youth, citing former Crows Aboriginal players like Andrew McLeod and Graham Johncock as his childhood heroes.

Ah Chee was given the number 4 which he previously wore at Brisbane, vacated at the Crows by Lachlan Murphy. He was selected to represent Western Australia in the AFL's 2026 Origin game, his second representative honour in as many years. He recovered from a hamstring strain to make his round one club debut against Collingwood, but reinjured the hamstring the following week against the Western Bulldogs.

== Statistics ==
Updated to the end of round 22, 2026.

Legend
G	Goals	K	Kicks	D	Disposals	T	Tackles
B	Behinds	H	Handballs	M	Marks
#	Played in that season's premiership team

Season	Team	No.	Games	Totals							Averages (per game)							Votes
Season	Team	No.	Games	G	B	K	H	D	M	T	G	B	K	H	D	M	T	Votes
2016	Gold Coast	13	16	9	9	85	124	209	46	49	0.6	0.6	5.3	7.8	13.1	2.9	3.1	0
2017	Gold Coast	13	14	12	3	86	74	160	34	43	0.9	0.2	6.1	5.3	11.4	2.4	3.1	0
2018	Gold Coast	13	14	3	6	127	77	204	51	37	0.2	0.4	9.1	5.5	14.6	3.6	2.6	0
2019	Gold Coast	13	1	0	0	11	6	17	5	2	0.0	0.0	11.0	6.0	17.0	5.0	2.0	0
2020 (Note: The 2020 season was played with 17 home-and-away matches per team (down from 22) and 16-minute quarters with time on (down from 20-minute quarters with time on) due to the impact of the COVID-19 pandemic.)	Brisbane Lions	4	18	3	4	138	69	207	63	52	0.2	0.2	7.7	3.8	11.5	3.5	2.9	0
2021	Brisbane Lions	4	21	7	0	103	96	199	35	58	0.3	0.0	4.9	4.6	9.5	1.7	2.8	0
2022	Brisbane Lions	4	21	8	6	132	112	244	74	36	0.4	0.3	6.3	5.3	11.6	3.5	1.7	0
2023	Brisbane Lions	4	12	6	5	81	45	126	42	27	0.5	0.4	6.8	3.8	10.5	3.5	2.3	0
2024^{#}	Brisbane Lions	4	26	27	14	228	120	348	122	40	1.0	0.5	8.8	4.6	13.4	4.7	1.5	0
2025^{#}	Brisbane Lions	4	26	24	29	233	116	349	138	45	0.9	1.1	9.0	4.5	13.4	5.3	1.7	2
2026	Adelaide	4	6	7	4	36	32	68	19	8	1.2	0.7	6.0	5.3	11.3	3.2	1.3	0
Career			175	106	80	1260	871	2131	629	397	0.6	0.5	7.2	5.0	12.2	3.6	2.3	2

== Honours and achievements ==
Team

- 2× AFL premiership player: 2024, 2025
- McClelland Trophy/Club Championship: 2025

== Personal life ==
Ah Chee is the youngest of three brothers – Brendon, who was also a professional Australian rules footballer who played for West Coast and Port Adelaide, and Jordan.

In 2025, Ah Chee and his family, led by eldest brother Jordan, designed the Brisbane Lions' Indigenous guernsey for the Sir Doug Nicholls Round. The design reflected "not only Ah Chee’s journey to the Lions but his connection to his parents, brothers and the football club".
