= Hugh McCluggage =

Australian rules footballer

Personal information
- Full name: Hugh McCluggage
- Nicknames: Bags, The Scottish Suitcase, Luggage, Huge Luggage, Mcdamage
- Born: 3 March 1998 (age 28)
- Original team: North Ballarat Rebels (TAC Cup)/South Warrnambool Football Club
- Draft: No. 3, 2016 national draft
- Debut: Round 3, 2017, Brisbane Lions vs. St Kilda, at Etihad Stadium
- Height: 187 cm (6 ft 2 in)
- Weight: 87 kg (192 lb)
- Position: Midfielder

Club information
- Current club: Brisbane Lions
- Number: 6

Playing career^{1}
Years	Club	Games (Goals)
2017–	Brisbane Lions	222 (142)

Representative team honours^{2}
Years	Team	Games (Goals)
2026–	Victoria	1 (2)
- ^{1} Playing statistics correct to the end of round 22, 2026.^{2} Representative statistics correct as of 2026.

Career highlights
- 3× AFL Premiership player: 2024, 2025, 2026 (c); Brisbane Lions co-captain: 2026–present; All-Australian team: 2025; AFL Rising Star nominee: 2017; 2× 22under22 team: 2019, 2020; Morrish Medal: 2016

Hugh McCluggage (born 3 March 1998) is a professional Australian rules footballer and co-captain of the Brisbane Lions in the Australian Football League (AFL).

== Early life ==
McCluggage was raised in Allansford, Victoria and participated in the Auskick program there before playing junior football with the Allansford Football Club in the Warrnambool District Football League. He later played for Hampden Football League club South Warrnambool. In addition to Australian rules, McCluggage also played junior cricket, hockey, and soccer. He attended secondary school at Warrnambool College, before finishing his final two years of school at Ballarat Clarendon College as a boarder. The latter was where he met Jarrod Berry and formed a close friendship.

McCluggage played senior Australian rules with South Warrnambool Football Club in the Hampden Football Netball League. He represented Vic Country in the AFL Under-18 Championships and played under 18 football with the North Ballarat Rebels in the TAC Cup winning the Morrish Medal despite playing only 10 matches.

He was drafted by Brisbane with their first selection and third overall in the 2016 national draft.

== AFL career ==
He made his debut in the thirty-one point loss against St Kilda at Etihad Stadium in round three of the 2017 season. After the sixty point loss to Greater Western Sydney at the Gabba in round 14, in which he recorded nineteen disposals, eight marks and two tackles, he received the round nomination for the 2017 AFL Rising Star.

In 2019 and 2020, McCluggage came third in the Merrett–Murray Medal, and he was runner-up to Dayne Zorko and Lachie Neale in 2021 and 2022 respectively. McCluggage also collected a career-best 14 Brownlow Medal votes in 2022. A maiden best-and-fairest award eluded McCluggage yet again in 2023, losing to captain Harris Andrews during a year in which the Lions made the grand final.

McCluggage was part of the Brisbane Lions 2024 premiership winning team, having 21 disposals and a goal in a dominant team victory.

In 2025, after averaging 27 disposals, 5.8 clearances and 7.6 score involvements a game, McCluggage was named in the 2025 All-Australian team. McCluggage was part of the Lions' 2025 Premiership team, kicking four goals from 26 disposals.

== Statistics ==
Updated to the end of round 22, 2026.

Legend
G	Goals	K	Kicks	D	Disposals	T	Tackles
B	Behinds	H	Handballs	M	Marks
#	Played in that season's premiership team

Season	Team	No.	Games	Totals							Averages (per game)							Votes
Season	Team	No.	Games	G	B	K	H	D	M	T	G	B	K	H	D	M	T	Votes
2017	Brisbane Lions	6	18	8	15	152	120	272	70	36	0.4	0.8	8.4	6.7	15.1	3.9	2.0	0
2018	Brisbane Lions	6	22	10	9	240	186	426	96	68	0.5	0.4	10.9	8.5	19.4	4.4	3.1	1
2019	Brisbane Lions	6	23	23	14	320	201	521	90	84	1.0	0.6	13.9	8.7	22.7	3.9	3.7	5
2020 (Note: The 2020 season was played with 17 home-and-away matches per team (down from 22) and 16-minute quarters with time on (down from 20-minute quarters with time on) due to the impact of the COVID-19 pandemic.)	Brisbane Lions	6	19	8	21	219	136	355	70	52	0.4	1.1	11.5	7.2	18.7	3.7	2.7	4
2021	Brisbane Lions	6	24	15	22	407	193	600	123	89	0.6	0.9	17.0	8.0	25.0	5.1	3.7	10
2022	Brisbane Lions	6	24	20	18	341	251	592	127	116	0.8	0.8	14.2	10.5	24.7	5.3	4.8	14
2023	Brisbane Lions	6	25	13	13	327	231	558	117	91	0.5	0.5	13.1	9.2	22.3	4.7	3.6	3
2024^{#}	Brisbane Lions	6	27	19	14	397	270	667	143	99	0.7	0.5	14.7	10.0	24.7	5.3	3.7	12
2025^{#}	Brisbane Lions	6	27	18	12	398	334	732	115	122	0.7	0.4	14.7	12.4	27.1	4.3	4.5	21
2026^{#}	Brisbane Lions	6	13	8	6	122	109	231	49	42	0.6	0.5	9.4	8.4	17.8	3.8	3.2	0
Career			222	142	144	2923	2031	4954	1000	799	0.6	0.6	13.2	9.1	22.3	4.5	3.6	70

== Honours and achievements ==
Team

- 3x AFL Premiership player: 2024, 2025, 2026 (c)
- McClelland Trophy / Club Championship: 2025

Individual

- All-Australian team: 2025
- 2× 22under22 team: 2019, 2020
- AFL Rising Star nominee: 2017 (round 14)
