= Joe Daniher =

Australian rules footballer (born 1994)

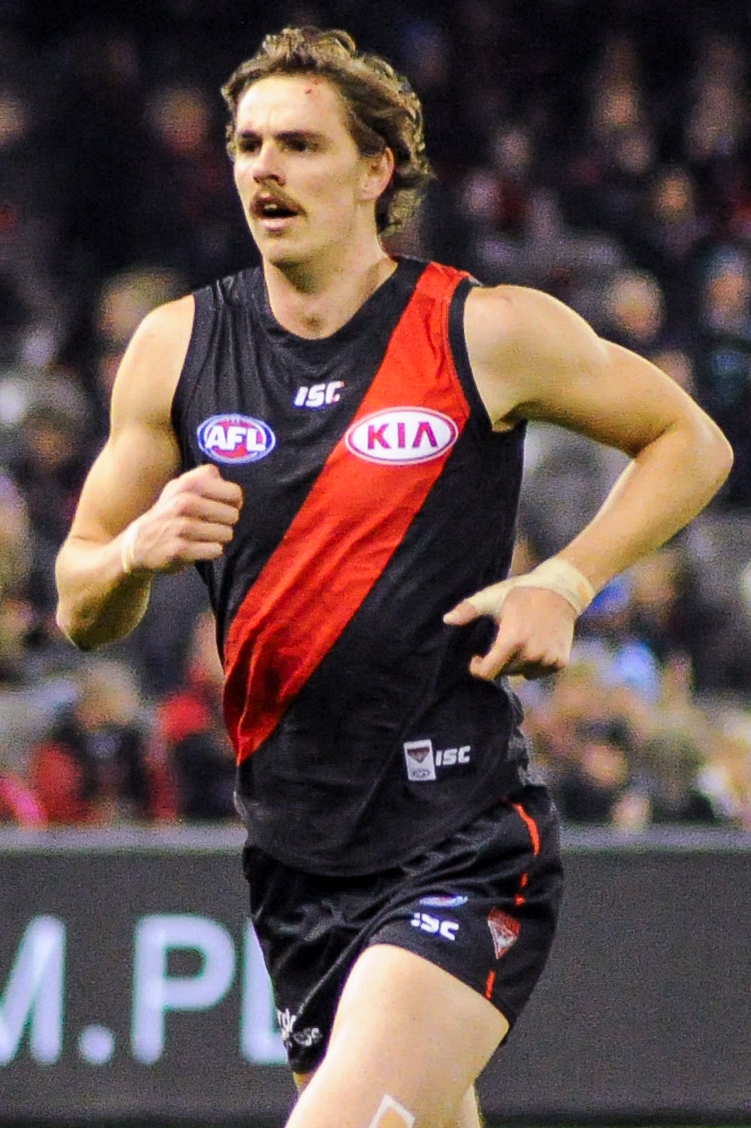
- Daniher playing for Essendon in June 2017

Personal information
- Full name: Joe Daniher
- Nicknames: Big Joe, Muscles
- Born: 4 March 1994 (age 32)
- Original team: Calder Cannons (TAC Cup)
- Draft: No. 10 (F/S), 2012 national draft
- Debut: Round 11, 2013, Essendon vs. Carlton, at the MCG
- Height: 201 cm (6 ft 7 in)
- Weight: 97 kg (214 lb)
- Position: Key forward

Playing career
Years	Club	Games (Goals)
2013–2020	Essendon	108 (191)
2021–2024	Brisbane Lions	96 (204)
Total		204 (395)

Career highlights
- AFL Premiership player: 2024; All-Australian team: 2017; Crichton Medal: 2017; 4× Essendon leading goalkicker: 2014, 2015, 2016, 2017; 2× Brisbane Lions leading goalkicker: 2023, 2024; Mark of the Year: 2017; Anzac Medal: 2017; 22under22 team: 2016; AFL Rising Star nominee: 2014

Joe Daniher (born 4 March 1994) is a former professional Australian rules footballer who played for the Essendon Football Club and the Brisbane Lions.

Daniher won a Crichton Medal and All-Australian selection in 2017, as well as the 2017 AFL Mark of the Year and Anzac Medal for that season. He is a four-time Essendon leading goalkicker and a two-time Brisbane Lions leading goalkicker. Daniher was a premiership player with Brisbane in 2024.

== Early life and football career ==
Daniher is the son of a former AFL full-back, Anthony Daniher, who played 115 games for the Sydney Swans and 118 games for Essendon. His uncles, Anthony's brothers Terry, Neale and Chris, also played for Essendon. He played junior football for Aberfeldie in the Essendon District Football League and attended St Bernard’s College.

Daniher played for the Calder Cannons in the TAC Cup. He was named an All-Australian in the AFL Under-18 Championships, playing for Vic Metro. Daniher was part of the AFL Academy at the Australian Institute of Sport, participating in its European tour to Italy, England and France in 2012 competing against the combined European Legion team.

== AFL career ==
=== Essendon (2013–2020) ===
Daniher was drafted by Essendon under the father–son rule, with the tenth overall selection in the 2012 national draft. He was also eligible to be drafted by Sydney, but chose to join the Bombers, where his brother Darcy Daniher was a team member at the time. He made his debut against Carlton in Round 11, 2013. In his second game (Round 12 against Gold Coast), he was named among the best players, kicking his first AFL goal and scoring a total of three goals in the match.

He showed positive progression in his second season, leading the club in goal-kicking with 28 for the season, including four goals against North Melbourne in an elimination final at the MCG. Despite his skinny frame and inaccurate kicking for goal, he showed immense promise and started to stake his claim as one of the best young key forwards in the league.

Daniher entered the 2015 AFL season as the club's spearhead up forward, a challenging task considering it was only his third season of senior football. Despite kicking only 34 goals for the season, Daniher showed improvement in many key areas of his game, especially accuracy in shooting for goal. That was partly due to the fact that former player and Essendon champion Matthew Lloyd helped him throughout the year. He led the club's goalkicking for a second consecutive season and showed more presence on the field.

In 2016, he continued to grow as a footballer and leader, being named in the club's leadership group and finishing the season with a career-high in marks (141) and goals (43). He won the club goalkicking award for a third consecutive year and was joint runner-up with James Kelly in the W.S. Crichton Medal.

He started the 2017 AFL season strongly, reaching his potential as one of the best forwards in the league, and winning both the Anzac Day Medal and the inaugural Tom Wills Medal in the Country Game against Geelong. He finished as the club's leading goalkicker for a fourth straight season, received his debut All-Australian Team selection, and won his first W. S. Crichton Medal.

Daniher started the 2018 AFL season in substantially worse form than in the previous year, averaging less than a goal a game and having a reduced impact on the competition. After Round 7, scans revealed the early onset of osteitis pubis, causing him to miss the rest of the season.

After a strong pre-season, Daniher looked set for a big 2019 season, but a mysterious calf injury, sustained in training, meant he missed the first four rounds of the 2019 AFL season. Despite not being named for Round 5, Daniher was given a late call-up for the Bombers in the Round 5 game against the Kangaroos on Good Friday. Because Daniher was not named on Essendon's initial list for the round, the Bombers incurred a fine, but Daniher proved his worth by kicking two goals, including one from over 55 metres out. After four matches, he was ruled out for the remainder of 2019 due to a groin injury. Toward the conclusion of the season, he requested a trade to Sydney but, because Sydney could not satisfy Essendon's trade request, Daniher remained at Essendon for the 2020 season. After the 2020 season, exercising his rights as a free agent, he moved to the Brisbane Lions.

=== Brisbane Lions (2021–2024) ===
Daniher made his debut for the Brisbane Lions against Sydney at the Gabba in Round 1, 2021. He kicked two goals, but he attracted criticism from former Port Adelaide player Kane Cornes for his jumper-grabbing celebration after kicking the first of those goals, which gave Lions an 18-point lead in a match they would ultimately lose by 31 points.

Daniher became the only player to kick at least one goal every game for the 2021 season, but he fell away during the Lions' finals campaign and kicked only one goal from two games.

In Brisbane's 2022 elimination final against Richmond, Daniher kicked the winning goal in the dying stages of the match to give the Lions a two-point win, 106–104. Brisbane were eventually knocked out of the finals by Geelong in the preliminary final, losing by 71 points.

In 2023, Daniher led Brisbane with 61 goals. At the end of the season, he played in his first AFL Grand Final. Daniher kicked 3 goals and was one of Brisbane's best players on the day, but the Lions fell to Collingwood by four points.

Daniher again led the Lions in goals in 2024, kicking 58 over 27 games. In Brisbane's semi-final against the Greater Western Sydney Giants, Daniher kicked four goals, including the final two goals which completed a 44-point comeback. Daniher added a pair of goals in the Grand Final as the Lions defeated the Sydney Swans. Just five days after winning the premiership, on 3 October 2024, Daniher announced his retirement.

== Statistics ==
Legend
G	Goals	K	Kicks	D	Disposals	T	Tackles
B	Behinds	H	Handballs	M	Marks	H/O	Hit-outs

Season	Team	No.	Games	Totals								Averages (per game)								Votes
Season	Team	No.	Games	G	B	K	H	D	M	T	H/O	G	B	K	H	D	M	T	H/O	Votes
2013	Essendon	6	5	3	9	36	25	61	27	3	3	0.6	1.8	7.2	5.0	12.2	5.4	0.6	0.6	0
2014	Essendon	6	21	28	20	159	78	237	112	28	53	1.3	1.0	7.6	3.7	11.3	5.3	1.3	2.5	1
2015	Essendon	6	22	34	24	147	81	228	111	35	43	1.5	1.1	6.7	3.7	10.4	5.0	1.6	2.0	5
2016	Essendon	6	22	43	32	204	86	290	141	21	35	2.0	1.5	9.3	3.9	13.2	6.4	1.0	1.6	4
2017	Essendon	6	23	65	39	249	103	352	153	31	78	2.8	1.7	10.8	4.5	15.3	6.7	1.3	3.4	9
2018	Essendon	6	7	8	9	73	24	97	39	9	9	1.1	1.3	10.4	3.4	13.9	5.6	1.3	1.3	0
2019	Essendon	6	4	7	5	33	18	51	22	8	16	1.8	1.3	8.3	4.5	12.8	5.5	2.0	4.0	0
2020 (Note: The 2020 season was played with 17 home-and-away matches per team (down from 22) and 16-minute quarters with time on (down from 20-minute quarters with time on) due to the impact of the COVID-19 pandemic.)	Essendon	6	4	3	6	31	8	39	25	1	1	0.8	1.5	7.8	2.0	9.8	6.3	0.3	0.3	1
2021	Brisbane Lions	3	24	46	32	259	83	342	117	25	49	1.9	1.3	10.8	3.5	14.3	4.9	1.0	2.0	4
2022	Brisbane Lions	3	19	39	24	158	50	208	82	12	4	2.1	1.3	8.3	2.6	10.9	4.3	0.6	0.2	0
2023	Brisbane Lions	3	26	61	37	316	72	388	154	20	48	2.3	1.4	12.2	2.8	14.9	5.9	0.8	1.8	12
2024^{#}	Brisbane Lions	3	27	58	51^{†}	328	93	421	173	31	58	2.1	1.9	12.1	3.4	15.6	6.4	1.1	2.1	8
Career			204	395	288	1993	721	2714	1156	224	397	1.9	1.4	9.8	3.5	13.3	5.7	1.1	1.9	44

== Honours and achievements ==
Team

- AFL Premiership player: 2024

Individual

- W.S. Crichton Medal: 2017
- All-Australian team: 2017
- 4× Essendon F.C. leading goalkicker: 2014, 2015, 2016, 2017
- 2× Brisbane Lions leading goalkicker: 2023, 2024
- Anzac Day Medal: 2017
- AFL Mark of the Year: 2017
- 22under22 team: 2016
- AFL Rising Star nominee: 2014 (round 12)
