= 2022 Geelong Football Club season =

The 2022 Geelong Football Club season was the club's 158th season playing Australian rules football, with the club competing in their 123rd season in the Australian Football League (AFL). Geelong also fielded a women's team in both 2022 AFL Women's season 6 and 2022 AFL Women's season 7, and a men's and women's reserves team in the Victorian Football League (VFL) and the VFL Women's (VFLW) respectively.

== AFL team ==
Geelong Football Club
2022 AFL season
- President: Craig Drummond
- Coach: Chris Scott (12th season)
- Captains: Joel Selwood (11th season)
- Home ground: GMHBA Stadium
- AFL season: 18 wins, 4 losses (1st)
- Finals series: Premiers
- Best and Fairest: Jeremy Cameron and Cameron Guthrie
- Leading goalkicker: Tom Hawkins (67)
- Highest home attendance: 100,024 vs. Sydney (Grand Final)
- Lowest home attendance: 18,091 vs. North Melbourne (Round 16)
- Average home attendance: 26,875
- Club membership: 71,943

=== Season summary ===
It was the club's twelfth AFL season under senior coach Chris Scott, with Joel Selwood appointed as club captain for a seventh successive year. In the 2022 AFL season Geelong finished the home-and-away season with an 18-4 record, to finish on top of the league ladder to claim the McClelland Trophy, and qualify for the 2022 finals series. The club would win consecutive finals at the Melbourne Cricket Ground to qualify for the 2022 AFL Grand Final where it defeated Sydney 20.13 (133) to 8.4 (52) to claim the club's tenth V/AFL premiership.

After the home-and-away season, Jeremy Cameron and Tom Hawkins were the club's leading goalkickers with 59 goals each. Cameron and Hawkins were both selected in the 2022 All-Australian team along with backman Tom Stewart, utility Mark Blicavs, and fellow forward Tyson Stengle. Young full-back Sam De Koning finished second in the AFL Rising Star to Collingwood's Nick Daicos.

=== Pre-season ===
Geelong defeated Richmond in a pre-season scratch match at GMHBA Stadium played over six periods with both senior and reserves players. The final score was Geelong 20.27 (147) vs. Richmond 21.16 (142). Geelong also competed in 2022 AAMI Community Series against Gold Coast and were defeated 13.17 (95) vs. Geelong's 11.6 (72). Geelong's home-and-away season began on 19 March against Essendon at the Melbourne Cricket Ground (MCG).

=== Coaching staff ===
Chris Scott continued as the club's men's senior coach for a twelfth season, and in May 2022, signed a two-year contract extension until the end of the 2024 season.

Following the end of the 2021 season, Geelong overhauled their football department, with Matthew Scarlett, Corey Enright, and Matthew Knights departing. Several former Geelong players joined the football department as their replacements. Coming in as head of medical and conditioning services were Harry Taylor, head of player development Matthew Egan, and development coaches James Kelly and Josh Jenkins. Joining them were Jason Lappin (football analyst) and the recently retired Eddie Betts (development).

Geelong instituted a non-traditional coaching structure in 2022 with the club moving away from assistant coaches being responsible for specific positions.

2022 Geelong coaching staff
Role	Name
Senior coach	Chris Scott
Assistant coach	Nigel Lappin
Assistant coach	Shaun Grigg
Assistant coach	James Kelly
Head of player development	Matthew Egan
Development coach	Eddie Betts
Development coach	Josh Jenkins
Ruck coach	Brad Ottens

=== Playing list ===
==== Changes ====
At the end of the 2021 AFL season, three players (Josh Jenkins, Lachie Henderson, and Stefan Okunbor) retired, and four players (Ben Jarvis, Cameron Taheny, Oscar Brownless, and Charlie Constable) were delisted.

Deletions from playing list
Player	Reason	Ref.
Nathan Kreuger	Traded to Collingwood	
Darcy Fort	Traded to Brisbane Lions	
Jordan Clark	Traded to Fremantle	
Josh Jenkins	Retired	
Lachie Henderson	Retired	
Stefan Okunbor	Retired	
Ben Jarvis	Delisted	
Cameron Taheny	Delisted	
Oscar Brownless	Delisted	
Charlie Constable	Delisted	

Additions to playing list
Player	Acquired	Ref.
Tyson Stengle	Delisted free agent (from Woodville-West Torrens (SANFL)^{[a]}	
Jonathon Ceglar	Traded from Hawthorn	
Toby Conway	No. 24, 2021 national draft	
Mitchell Knevitt	No. 25, 2021 national draft	
James Willis	No. 32, 2021 national draft	
Flynn Kroeger	No. 48, 2021 national draft	
Cooper Whyte	No. 64, 2021 national draft	
Oliver Dempsey	No. 15, 2022 rookie draft	
Zane Williams	No. 12, 2022 mid-season rookie draft	

- ^{a} Tyson Stengle was delisted by Adelaide during the 2021 pre-season

==== Statistics ====
Key
^	Denotes player who was on the club's standard rookie list, and therefore eligible for senior selection.
#	Denotes Category B rookie where player needed to be elevated to club's senior list during this season to be eligible for senior selection.

Playing list and statistics
Player	No.	Games	Goals	Behinds	Kicks	Handballs	Disposals	Marks	Tackles	Hitouts	Milestone(s)
Tom Atkins^	30	25	4	3	238	214	452	65	157	0	
Jed Bews	24	23	1	2	134	115	249	79	43	0	150th game (Preliminary final)
Mark Blicavs	46	24	8	5	186	239	425	97	121	350	
Jeremy Cameron	5	24	65	37	272	116	388	141	34	1	500th goal (round 12); 200th game (round 15)
Jonathon Ceglar	15	3	0	0	16	19	35	2	2	47	Club debut (round 20)
Brad Close^	45	25	26	20	181	213	394	85	93	0	50th game (round 21)
Toby Conway	6	0	—N/a	—N/a	—N/a	—N/a	—N/a	—N/a	—N/a	—N/a	
Luke Dahlhaus	40	10	3	2	40	64	104	20	19	0	
Patrick Dangerfield	35	18	8	12	226	178	404	70	49	0	300th game (round 23)
Sam De Koning	16	23	1	0	143	138	281	120	6	4	
Oliver Dempsey^	28	2	1	1	5	14	19	0	2	0	AFL debut (round 6)
Mitch Duncan	22	22	9	7	342	173	515	184	35	0	250th game (round 16)
Francis Evans	31	5	1	0	14	24	38	8	7	0	
Cameron Guthrie	29	25	12	12	316	297	613	90	124	0	
Zach Guthrie	39	21	5	3	224	97	321	116	48	0	50th game (round 22)
Tom Hawkins	26	25	67	43	221	107	328	142	39	85	700th goal (round 14)
Jack Henry	38	17	4	1	119	65	184	82	24	6	100th game (round 19)
Shaun Higgins	4	5	1	1	41	42	83	15	19	0	
Max Holmes	9	18	13	6	161	119	280	68	42	0	
Mitch Knevitt	10	2	0	2	10	12	22	8	3	0	AFL debut (round 8)
Jake Kolodjashnij	8	23	2	0	165	111	276	107	33	0	150th game (round 21)
Flynn Kroeger	25	0	—N/a	—N/a	—N/a	—N/a	—N/a	—N/a	—N/a	—N/a	
Sam Menegola	27	7	5	4	87	38	125	28	8	0	
Gryan Miers	32	22	13	13	174	153	327	80	47	0	
Oisín Mullin#	34	0	—N/a	—N/a	—N/a	—N/a	—N/a	—N/a	—N/a	—N/a	
Quinton Narkle	19	8	4	3	40	28	68	21	8	0	
Shannon Neale	33	2	0	0	4	9	13	3	4	14	AFL debut (round 11)
Mark O'Connor	42	22	0	4	171	106	277	84	56	0	
Brandan Parfitt	3	17	5	4	168	180	348	32	80	0	100th game (round 5)
Esava Ratugolea	17	4	0	0	17	9	26	9	8	13	
Gary Rohan	23	12	14	6	71	37	108	31	29	0	
Joel Selwood	14	21	7	3	238	221	459	67	91	0	350th game (round 20)
Sam Simpson	37	0	—N/a	—N/a	—N/a	—N/a	—N/a	—N/a	—N/a	—N/a	
Isaac Smith	7	24	15	22	339	178	517	161	31	0	250th game (round 17)
Rhys Stanley	1	20	3	2	146	111	257	64	36	418	
Tyson Stengle	18	25	53	27	247	114	361	82	64	0	Club debut (round 1)
Cooper Stephens	12	7	0	0	36	40	76	14	11	0	AFL debut (round 8)
Nick Stevens	21	0	—N/a	—N/a	—N/a	—N/a	—N/a	—N/a	—N/a	—N/a	
Tom Stewart	44	20	0	1	354	111	465	146	40	1	
Paul Tsapatolis#	36	0	—N/a	—N/a	—N/a	—N/a	—N/a	—N/a	—N/a	—N/a	
Zach Tuohy	2	24	9	6	351	169	520	120	44	0	250th game (Grand Final)
Cooper Whyte	11	0	—N/a	—N/a	—N/a	—N/a	—N/a	—N/a	—N/a	—N/a	
Zane Williams^	41	0	—N/a	—N/a	—N/a	—N/a	—N/a	—N/a	—N/a	—N/a	
James Willis	20	0	—N/a	—N/a	—N/a	—N/a	—N/a	—N/a	—N/a	—N/a	

=== Results ===
Key
H	Home game
A	Away game
QF	Qualifying final
PF	Preliminary final
GF	Grand Final

Table of 2022 AFL season results
Round	Date	Result	Score			Opponent	Score			Ground		Attendance	Ladder
Round	Date	Result	G	B	T	Opponent	G	B	T	Ground		Attendance	Ladder
1	19 March	Won	20	18	138	Essendon	11	6	72	Melbourne Cricket Ground	H	54,495	1st
2	25 March	Lost	10	17	77	Sydney	17	5	107	Sydney Cricket Ground	A	36,578	7th
3	2 April	Won	16	8	104	Collingwood	13	13	91	Melbourne Cricket Ground	A	52,974	7th
4	8 April	Won	11	14	80	Brisbane Lions	11	4	70	GMHBA Stadium	H	20,505	5th
5	18 April	Lost	11	14	80	Hawthorn	14	8	92	Melbourne Cricket Ground	A	48,030	7th
6	24 April	Won	17	19	121	North Melbourne	9	7	61	Blundstone Arena	A	8,663	6th
7	30 April	Lost	10	6	66	Fremantle	10	9	69	GMHBA Stadium	H	20,136	7th
8	7 May	Won	12	16	88	Greater Western Sydney	4	11	35	Manuka Oval	A	11,661	5th
9	14 May	Lost	11	14	80	St Kilda	13	12	90	Marvel Stadium	A	32,517	7th
10	21 May	Won	11	16	82	Port Adelaide	7	5	47	GMHBA Stadium	H	18,721	6th
11	28 May	Won	15	7	97	Adelaide	7	13	55	GMHBA Stadium	H	19,051	6th
12	3 June	Won	12	11	83	Western Bulldogs	10	10	70	Marvel Stadium	A	34,370	4th
13	Bye												5th
14	18 June	Won	12	9	81	West Coast	9	9	63	Optus Stadium	A	32,526	4th
15	25 June	Won	13	11	89	Richmond	13	8	86	Melbourne Cricket Ground	H	59,335	2nd
16	2 July	Won	21	18	144	North Melbourne	5	2	32	GMHBA Stadium	H	18,091	2nd
17	7 July	Won	12	19	91	Melbourne	9	9	63	GMHBA Stadium	H	21,501	1st
18	16 July	Won	12	13	85	Carlton	8	7	55	Melbourne Cricket Ground	A	68,208	1st
19	23 July	Won	16	10	106	Port Adelaide	14	10	94	Adelaide Oval	A	30,937	1st
20	30 July	Won	14	10	94	Western Bulldogs	9	12	66	GMHBA Stadium	H	22,106	1st
21	6 August	Won	17	8	110	St Kilda	10	5	65	GMHBA Stadium	H	20,583	1st
22	13 August	Won	18	11	119	Gold Coast	9	5	59	Metricon Stadium	A	14,728	1st
23	20 August	Won	19	17	131	West Coast	7	4	46	GMHBA Stadium	H	21,098	1st
QF	3 September	Won	11	12	78	Collingwood	10	12	72	Melbourne Cricket Ground	H	91,525	—N/a
PF	16 September	Won	18	12	120	Brisbane Lions	7	7	49	Melbourne Cricket Ground	H	77,677	—N/a
GF	24 September	Won	20	13	133	Sydney	8	4	52	Melbourne Cricket Ground	H	100,024	—N/a

=== Ladder ===
Pos	Team	Pld	W	L	D	PF	PA	PP	Pts	Qualification
1	Geelong (P)	22	18	4	0	2146	1488	144.2	72	Finals series
2	Melbourne	22	16	6	0	1936	1483	130.5	64	Finals series
3	Sydney	22	16	6	0	2067	1616	127.9	64	Finals series
4	Collingwood	22	16	6	0	1839	1763	104.3	64	Finals series
5	Fremantle	22	15	6	1	1739	1486	117.0	62	Finals series
6	Brisbane Lions	22	15	7	0	2147	1799	119.3	60	Finals series
7	Richmond	22	13	8	1	2165	1780	121.6	54	Finals series
8	Western Bulldogs	22	12	10	0	1973	1812	108.9	48	Finals series
9	Carlton	22	12	10	0	1857	1714	108.3	48	
10	St Kilda	22	11	11	0	1703	1715	99.3	44	
11	Port Adelaide	22	10	12	0	1806	1638	110.3	40	
12	Gold Coast	22	10	12	0	1871	1820	102.8	40	
13	Hawthorn	22	8	14	0	1787	1991	89.8	32	
14	Adelaide	22	8	14	0	1721	1986	86.7	32	
15	Essendon	22	7	15	0	1737	2087	83.2	28	
16	Greater Western Sydney	22	6	16	0	1631	1927	84.6	24	
17	West Coast	22	2	20	0	1429	2389	59.8	8	
18	North Melbourne	22	2	20	0	1337	2397	55.8	8	

Source: afl.com.au
Rules for classification: 1) points; 2) percentage; 3) number of points for.
(P) Premiers

=== Awards ===
==== League awards ====
- Norm Smith Medal: Isaac Smith
- Gary Ayres Award: Patrick Dangerfield
- All-Australian: Tom Hawkins (C), Mark Blicavs, Jeremy Cameron, Tyson Stengle, Tom Stewart
- Tom Wills Award: Patrick Dangerfield (Round 1 vs Essendon)
- Rising Star: Sam De Koning (Nominated – Round 11)

==== Club Awards ====
- Carji Greeves Medal: Jeremy Cameron & Cameron Guthrie
- Best Young Player Award: Sam De Koning
- Tom Harley Best Clubman: Tom Atkins
- Carter Family Community Champion Award: Joel Selwood

== VFL team ==
Geelong Football Club
2022 VFL season
- President: Craig Drummond
- Coach: Shane O'Bree (7th season)
- Captains: Matt Ling (1st season); Jackson McLachlan (1st season)
- Home ground: GMHBA Stadium
- VFL: 14th
- Best and Fairest: Jye Chalcraft
- Leading goalkicker: Shannon Neale (33)

Coached by Shane O'Bree, Geelong entered their reserve players into the Victorian Football League competition for the 22nd season since the competition merged with the AFL Reserves competition in 2000. Former Sydney player Matt Ling was appointed co-captain with Jackson McLachlan.

In the 18-match home-and-away season played over 22 rounds, Geelong did not qualify for the finals, finishing 14th on the ladder with an 8–10 win-loss record. Hit by injuries and availability issues, over 60 players made at least one VFL appearance for the season, with only co-captains Ling and McLachlan featuring in all 18 matches with Daniel Capiron. AFL-listed player Shannon Neale kicked 33 goals from 15 appearances to be the leading goalkicker for the club.

=== Ladder ===
Pos	Team	Pld	W	L	D	PF	PA	PP	Pts
12	Sandringham	18	8	9	1	1442	1534	94.0	34
13	Greater Western Sydney (R)	18	8	9	1	1302	1395	93.3	34
14	Geelong (R)	18	8	10	0	1271	1444	88.0	32
15	Essendon (R)	18	8	10	0	1454	1672	87.0	32
16	Port Melbourne	18	7	11	0	1346	1589	84.7	28

Source: AFL
Rules for classification: 1) points; 2) percentage; 3) number of points for
(R) = Reserves

=== Awards ===
- Best and Fairest: Jye Chalcraft
- Little Vic Award (Best first year player): Ben Lloyd

== Women's team ==
Geelong Football Club
2022 (S6) AFL Women's season
- President: Craig Drummond
- Coach: Daniel Lowther (1st season)
- Captains: Meg McDonald (2nd season)
- Home ground: GMHBA Stadium
- AFLW: 2 wins, 8 losses (12th)
- Best and Fairest: Amy McDonald
- Leading goalkicker: Phoebe McWilliams (10)
- Highest home attendance: 2,265 vs Collingwood (Round 3)
- Lowest home attendance: 1,603 vs Greater Western Sydney (Round 10)

=== 2022 AFL Women's season 6 ===
==== Summary ====
Following the departure of inaugural coach Paul Hood, the club appointed former Geelong player Daniel Lowther as head coach. Lowther had previously joined the AFLW team coaching staff in 2020 as an assistant coach looking after the midfield.

Number two pick in the 2021 AFL Women's draft Georgie Prespakis was nominated for the Rising Star Award, for her performance in the opening round of the season against North Melbourne; with 2020 draftee Darcy Moloney also nominated for the award later in the season.

==== Playing list ====
===== Statistics =====
Playing list and statistics
Player	No.	Games	Goals	Behinds	Kicks	Handballs	Disposals	Marks	Tackles
Rene Caris	1	3	0	0	6	10	16	1	6
Danielle Higgins	2	1	0	0	2	3	5	2	1
Amy McDonald	3	10	0	2	85	125	210	5	81
Darcy Moloney	4	8	2	0	41	57	98	7	36
Jordan Ivey	5	10	1	3	41	21	62	15	15
Julia Crockett-Grills	6	9	1	0	36	37	73	9	39
Madisen Maguire	7	6	1	0	8	14	22	3	10
Kate Darby	8	10	4	2	47	15	62	16	20
Nina Morrison	9	8	0	3	53	57	110	7	47
Georgie Rankin	10	9	0	1	40	28	68	15	34
Meg McDonald	11	10	0	0	45	35	80	20	20
Renee Garing	12	—N/a	—N/a	—N/a	—N/a	—N/a	—N/a	—N/a	—N/a
Olivia Fuller	13	7	0	0	17	29	46	6	14
Chloe Scheer	14	9	8	6	46	30	76	12	20
Olivia Barber	15	3	0	0	12	8	20	5	4
Chantel Emonson	16	10	1	0	71	26	97	13	35
Georgia Clarke	17	1	0	0	1	0	1	0	1
Laura Gardiner	18	5	0	1	28	39	67	5	22
Millie Brown	19	—N/a	—N/a	—N/a	—N/a	—N/a	—N/a	—N/a	—N/a
Zali Friswell	20	7	1	0	26	25	51	8	17
Rebecca Webster	21	10	3	2	81	87	168	14	63
Rachel Kearns	22	10	1	4	48	13	61	12	34
Phoebe McWilliams	23	10	10	3	39	21	60	23	18
Maddy McMahon	24	10	0	0	61	49	110	38	13
Stephanie Williams	25	—N/a	—N/a	—N/a	—N/a	—N/a	—N/a	—N/a	—N/a
Claudia Gunjaca	26	4	0	2	11	8	19	7	7
Sophie Van De Heuvel	27	9	0	1	41	22	63	10	20
Denby Taylor	28	—N/a	—N/a	—N/a	—N/a	—N/a	—N/a	—N/a	—N/a
Carly Remmos	29	—N/a	—N/a	—N/a	—N/a	—N/a	—N/a	—N/a	—N/a
Annabel Johnson	30	4	0	0	27	5	32	12	12
Gabbie Featherston	32	7	0	0	22	7	29	7	5
Georgie Prespakis	41	10	0	2	70	63	133	6	68
Madeline Keryk	45	10	0	0	62	33	95	9	18

==== Results ====
Key
H	Home game
A	Away game

Table of season results
Round	Date	Result	Score			Opponent	Score			Ground		Attendance
Round	Date	Result	G	B	T	Opponent	G	B	T	Ground		Attendance
1	8 January	Lost	2	6	18	North Melbourne	4	2	26	Arden Street Oval	A	1,872
2	15 January	Lost	2	5	17	Carlton	4	7	31	GMHBA Stadium	H	2,144
3	21 January	Lost	3	6	24	Collingwood	5	5	35	GMHBA Stadium	H	2,265
4	29 January	Lost	4	1	25	Brisbane	3	9	27	Maroochydore Multi Sports Complex	A	1,832
5	4 February	Won	4	3	27	West Coast	3	6	24	GMHBA Stadium	H	1,938
6	11 February	Lost	6	2	38	Gold Coast	7	7	49	Metricon Stadium	A	863
7	18 February	Lost	2	4	16	Western Bulldogs	3	10	28	Victoria University Whitten Oval	A	1,530
8	26 February	Won	5	3	33	Richmond	1	4	10	Swinburne Centre	A	1,521
9	5 March	Lost	0	9	9	St Kilda	2	6	18	RSEA Park	A	947
10	11 March	Lost	5	5	35	Greater Western Sydney	8	5	53	GMHBA Stadium	H	1,603

==== Ladder ====
Pos	Team	Pld	W	L	D	PF	PA	PP	Pts	Qualification
1	Adelaide (P)	10	9	1	0	405	187	216.6	36	Finals series
2	Melbourne	10	9	1	0	470	252	186.5	36	Finals series
3	Brisbane	10	8	2	0	496	252	196.8	32	Finals series
4	North Melbourne	10	7	3	0	346	249	139.0	28	Finals series
5	Fremantle	10	7	3	0	383	284	134.9	28	Finals series
6	Collingwood	10	6	4	0	340	276	123.2	24	Finals series
7	Western Bulldogs	10	4	5	1	354	372	95.2	18	
8	Carlton	10	4	6	0	304	362	84.0	16	
9	Greater Western Sydney	10	4	6	0	303	409	74.1	16	
10	Gold Coast	10	3	6	1	294	431	68.2	14	
11	Richmond	10	3	7	0	344	423	81.3	12	
12	Geelong	10	2	8	0	242	301	80.4	8	
13	St Kilda	10	2	8	0	213	401	53.1	8	
14	West Coast	10	1	9	0	222	517	42.9	4	

Source: Womens.AFL
Rules for classification: 1) points; 2) percentage; 3) number of points for.
(P) Premiers

==== Awards ====
===== League awards =====
- AFL Players Association 22under22 squad: Rebecca Webster, Georgie Prespakis

===== Club Awards =====
- Best and fairest: Amy McDonald
- Geelong AFLW Fan MVP: Amy McDonald
- The 'Hoops' Award: Kate Darby
- Community Champion: Georgie Rankin

=== VFLW Season ===
==== Results ====
Key
H	Home game
A	Away game
EF	Elimination Final

Table of season results
Round	Date	Result	Score			Opponent	Score			Ground	
Round	Date	Result	G	B	T	Opponent	G	B	T	Ground	
1	12 February	Won	11	7	73	Carlton	2	2	14	Deakin University, Waurn Ponds	H
2	19 February	Won	5	3	33	Hawthorn	2	3	15	Deakin University, Waurn Ponds	H
3	26 February	Won	7	10	52	Port Melbourne	0	1	1	Deakin University, Waurn Ponds	H
4	5 March	Lost	3	1	19	Southern Saints	6	3	39	Deakin University, Waurn Ponds	H
5	12 March	Lost	5	4	34	Casey	5	15	45	Deakin University, Waurn Ponds	H
6	27 March	Lost	1	5	11	Essendon	13	11	89	Deakin University, Waurn Ponds	H
7	3 April	Won	7	3	45	Western Bulldogs	1	1	7	VU Whitten Oval	A
8	9 April	Won	8	9	57	Collingwood	3	4	22	GMHBA Stadium	H
9	23 April	Lost	1	3	9	Casey	8	4	52	Casey Fields	A
10	30 April	Won	7	8	50	Port Melbourne	2	5	17	ETU Stadium	A
11	7 May	Won	6	5	41	North Melbourne	1	8	14	Arden Street Oval	A
12	14 May	Won	9	6	60	Darebin	1	2	8	Preston City Oval	A
13	22 May	Won	8	4	52	Williamstown	2	5	17	Williamstown Oval	A
14	28 May	Won	6	9	45	Collingwood	4	2	26	Olympic Park Oval	A
EF	11 June	Lost	2	6	18	Southern Saints	4	2	26	Deakin University, Waurn Ponds	H

==== Ladder ====
Pos	Team	Pld	W	L	D	PF	PA	PP	Pts	Qualification
2	Hawthorn	14	12	1	1	798	220	362.7	50	Finals series
3	Casey	14	11	3	0	701	331	211.8	44	Finals series
4	Geelong Cats	14	10	4	0	581	366	158.7	40	Finals series
5	Southern Saints	14	9	4	1	537	424	126.7	38	Finals series
6	Collingwood	14	7	7	0	450	499	90.2	28	Finals series

Source: AFL.com.au
Rules for classification: 1) points; 2) percentage; 3) number of points for.

==== Awards ====
- Best and Fairest: Paige Sheppard
- VFL Women's Team of the Year: Laura Gardiner (Rover), Paige Sheppard (Interchange)

=== 2022 AFL Women's season 7 ===
Geelong Football Club
2022 (S7) AFL Women's season
- President: Craig Drummond
- Coach: Daniel Lowther (2nd season)
- Captains: Meg McDonald (3rd season)
- Home ground: GMHBA Stadium
- AFLW season: 7 wins, 3 losses (5th)
- Finals series: Lost Elimination final
- Best and Fairest: Amy McDonald
- Leading goalkicker: Chloe Scheer (13)

The club qualified for the AFLW finals series for the first time since Geelong's inaugural season in the competition in 2019.

Geelong's score of 15.12 (102) and winning margin of 75 points against Sydney in Round 10 was the club's highest score and biggest win in the AFLW; with the first-half score of 9.6 (60) the highest first-half score in AFLW history.

==== Results ====
Key
PS	Pre season game
H	Home game
A	Away game
EF	Elimination final

Table of season results
Round	Date	Result	Score			Opponent	Score			Ground		Attendance
Round	Date	Result	G	B	T	Opponent	G	B	T	Ground		Attendance
PS	13 August	Won	8	5	52	Gold Coast	2	4	16	Austworld Centre Oval	A	N/A
1	28 August	Won	2	3	15	Richmond	1	5	11	GMHBA Stadium	H	4,252
2	3 September	Won	3	9	27	Fremantle	0	1	1	Fremantle Community Bank Oval	A	1,086
3	10 September	Lost	1	5	11	Collingwood	2	3	15	GMHBA Stadium	H	1,957
4	16 September	Lost	2	4	16	North Melbourne	4	4	28	University of Tasmania Stadium	A	540
5	22 September	Won	11	5	71	St Kilda	3	3	21	GMHBA Stadium	H	2,898
6	1 October	Won	5	7	37	Western Bulldogs	5	6	36	Mars Stadium	A	1,731
7	9 October	Won	6	7	43	Essendon	4	4	28	Reid Oval, Warrnambool	A	4,560
8	15 October	Won	4	10	34	West Coast	4	1	25	Ikon Park	H	1,085
9	21 October	Lost	4	4	28	Adelaide	4	6	30	Wigan Oval	A	2,573
10	29 October	Won	15	12	102	Sydney	4	3	27	GMHBA Stadium	H	2,084
EF	4 October	Lost	1	8	14	North Melbourne	2	4	16	GMHBA Stadium	H	4,338

==== Ladder ====
Pos	Team	Pld	W	L	D	PF	PA	PP	Pts	Qualification
1	Brisbane	10	9	1	0	545	193	282.4	36	Finals series
2	Melbourne (P)	10	9	1	0	519	184	282.1	36	Finals series
3	Adelaide	10	8	2	0	412	232	177.6	32	Finals series
4	Richmond	10	7	2	1	321	217	147.9	30	Finals series
5	Geelong	10	7	3	0	384	222	173.0	28	Finals series
6	Collingwood	10	7	3	0	289	244	118.4	28	Finals series
7	Western Bulldogs	10	7	3	0	326	297	109.8	28	Finals series
8	North Melbourne	10	6	3	1	382	229	166.8	26	Finals series
9	Gold Coast	10	5	5	0	309	351	88.0	20	
10	Essendon	10	4	6	0	349	354	98.6	16	
11	Greater Western Sydney	10	4	6	0	265	420	63.1	16	
12	Fremantle	10	3	6	1	267	400	66.8	14	
13	St Kilda	10	3	7	0	307	373	82.3	12	
14	Carlton	10	2	6	2	253	342	74.0	12	
15	Hawthorn	10	3	7	0	245	429	57.1	12	
16	West Coast	10	2	8	0	239	449	53.2	8	
17	Port Adelaide	10	1	8	1	255	361	70.6	6	
18	Sydney	10	0	10	0	207	577	35.9	0	

Source: afl.com.au
Rules for classification: 1) points; 2) percentage; 3) number of points for
(P) Premiers

==== Awards ====
===== League awards =====
- 2022 AFL Women's season 7 All-Australian team: Georgie Prespakis (Wing); Chloe Scheer (Full forward); Amy McDonald (Interchange)
- Mark of the Year: Chloe Scheer (Round 4 vs. North Melbourne)
- AFL Players Association 22under22 squad: Nina Morrison; Georgie Prespakis; Annabel Johnson

===== Club Awards =====
- Best and fairest: Amy McDonald
- Geelong AFLW Fan MVP: Georgie Prespakis
- The 'Hoops' Award: Mikayla Bowen
- Community Champion: Kate Darby & Georgie Rankin
