= McCartin =

McCartin is a surname. Notable people with the surname include:

- Joe McCartin (born 1939), Irish politician
- Joseph McCartin (born 1959), American historian
- Mandy McCartin (born 1958), English artist
- Paddy McCartin (born 1996), Australian footballer
- Tom McCartin (born 1999), Australian footballer
