= Terry De Koning =

Australian rules footballer

Personal information
- Full name: Terry De Koning
- Nickname: TDK
- Born: 10 May 1961 (age 65)
- Original team: Doveton
- Height: 196 cm (6 ft 5 in)
- Weight: 96 kg (212 lb)
- Position: Bench

Playing career^{1}
Years	Club	Games (Goals)
1980–82	Footscray	31 (2)
- ^{1} Playing statistics correct to the end of 1982.

Terry De Koning (/ˈkoʊnɪŋ/ KOH-ning; born 10 May 1961) is a former Australian rules footballer who played with Footscray in the Victorian Football League (VFL).

== VFL career ==
At 196 cm Terry De Koning was always going to be a ruckman. He spent three years at Footscray under the coaching of Royce Hart. He played 31 games and kicked two goals.

== Personal ==
One son Tom has played 100 games for Carlton while his younger son Sam has played in a Geelong premiership side. In 2025 De Koning won the AUD20,000 jackpot prize in the Australian version of game show Tipping Point.

He is a former PE Teacher at St Bedes College Mentone and St Augustine’s School Frankston South.
