= Isaac Smith (footballer) =

Australian rules footballer (born 1988)

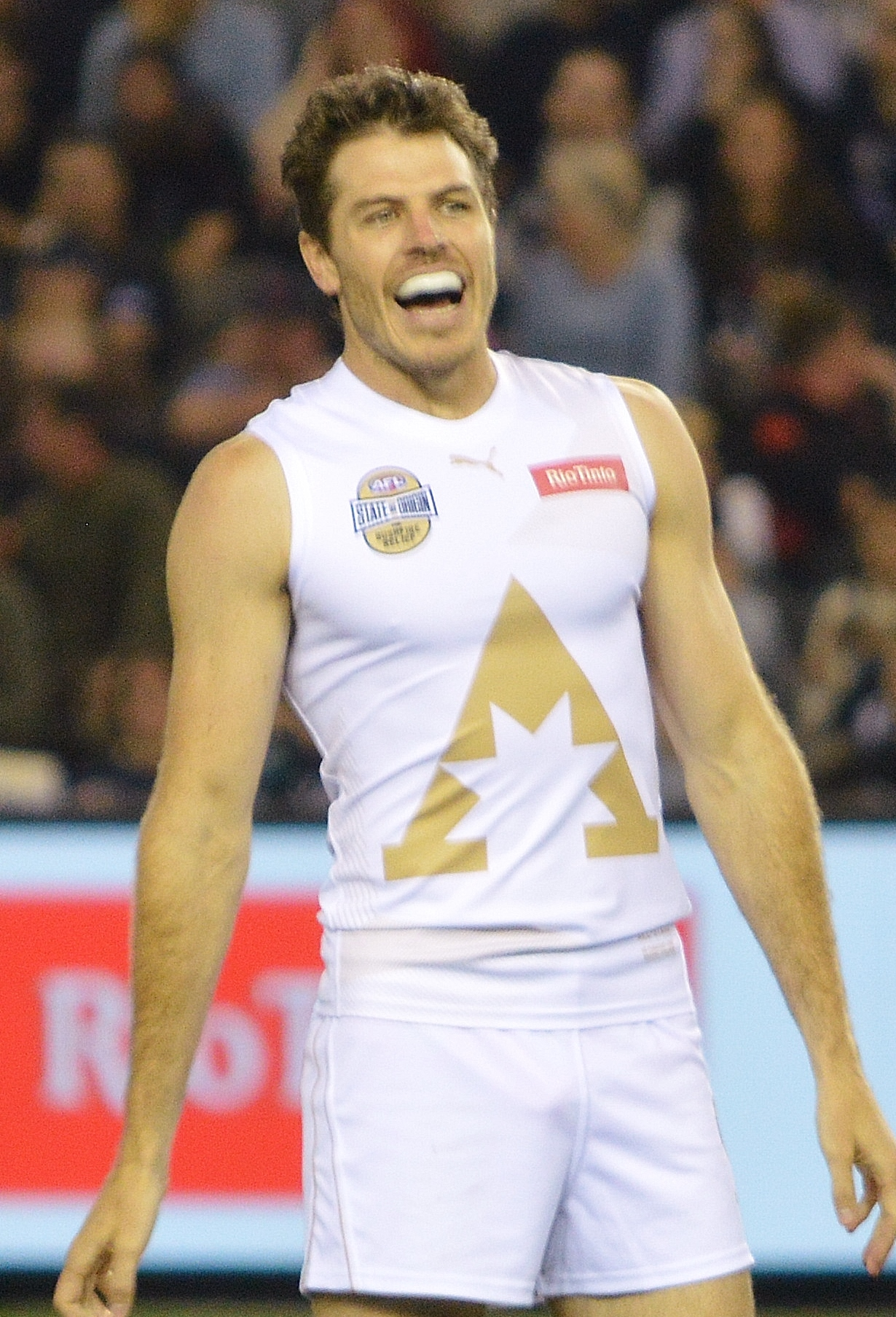
- Smith playing for the All-Stars in 2020

Personal information
- Nickname: Issie
- Born: 30 December 1988 (age 37); Young, New South Wales
- Original teams: North Ballarat (VFL); Wagga Tigers (Riverina FNL)
- Draft: No. 19, 2010 national draft
- Debut: Round 7, 2011, Hawthorn vs. Port Adelaide, at AAMI Stadium
- Height: 188 cm (6 ft 2 in)
- Weight: 83 kg (183 lb)
- Positions: Midfielder, forward

Playing career^{1}
Years	Club	Games (Goals)
2011–2020	Hawthorn	210 (165)
2021–2023	Geelong	70 (40)
Total		280 (205)

Representative team honours^{2}
Years	Team	Games (Goals)
2020	All-stars	1 (2)
- ^{1} Playing statistics correct to the end of 2023.^{2} Representative statistics correct as of 2020.

Career highlights
- 4× AFL premiership player: 2013–2015, 2022; Norm Smith Medal: 2022; Hawthorn vice-captain: 2017–2019; Hawthorn life member

Isaac Smith (born 30 December 1988) is a former Australian rules football player who played for the Hawthorn Football Club and Geelong Football Club in the Australian Football League. Smith was drafted by the Hawthorn with the 19th pick in the 2010 AFL draft and played ten seasons for the Hawks. He took part in each of Hawthorn's three consecutive Grand Final victories from 2013 to 2015. Following the 2020 season, Smith moved to the Geelong Football Club as a free agent and played with the Cats for three seasons. He won his fourth premiership with Geelong in 2022 and was awarded the Norm Smith Medal as the game's best player. Smith retired from AFL at the conclusion of the 2023 AFL season, his third year at Geelong.

== Early career ==
Smith was born in Young, New South Wales and moved to Cootamundra where he attended school. As a child he played Australian rules football and basketball with Luke Breust in Temora. Moving to Wagga Wagga when he was 13, Smith played with future Hawthorn teammate Matt Suckling in the Wagga Hawks for several years before both moved to the Wagga Tigers where they won two premierships. Smith then played with Albury in the Ovens & Murray Football League in 2007.

Smith later moved to Victoria to take up a Sports Management Degree at the University of Ballarat. He joined the Redan Football Club and became known for being an effective left-footed kick in the Redan reserves. After winning the 2009 senior Ballarat Football League (BFL) Grand Final, he resisted North Ballarat's overtures to do a pre-season with them, but by midway through 2010, he was not only being pulled again by the Roosters, but pushed from within by Redan.

Smith had a meteoric rise in 2010, starting the year playing with Redan in the BFL and finishing in North Ballarat's Victorian Football League (VFL) premiership side. Smith was also a member of the successful Victorian Country Football League (VCFL) team that won the 2010 Australian Country Football Championships in Canberra.

Smith was Hawthorn's first pick in the 2010 AFL draft, being selected with pick 19. Smith's path to the AFL was considered unusual, as he had been passed on the draft the previous year and had been considered unlikely to be drafted at the start of 2010.

== AFL career ==
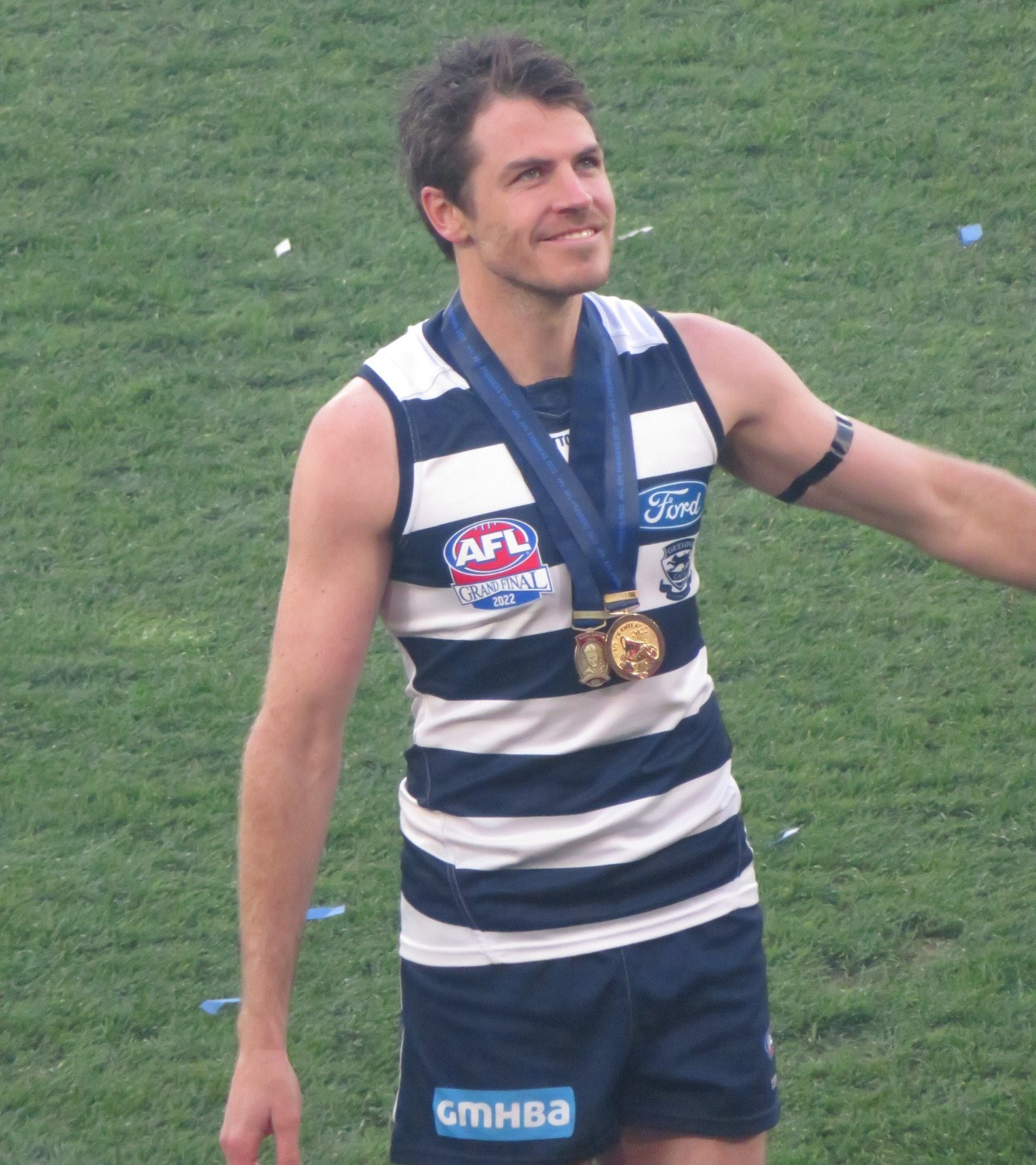
Smith after being awarded the Norm Smith Medal at the 2022 AFL Grand Final.

During the 2011 season, Smith drew attention for his reliance on speed rather than strength or size in his playing.

Smith was widely regarded as having a good 2013 season, and was a member of the 2013 Hawthorn premiership side. His performance in the 2013 Grand Final included kicking an outstanding 50m goal in the last quarter.

In the 2016 Qualifying Final match against traditional rivals Geelong, Smith drew attention for missing a relatively simple shot on goal after the siren, the scoring of which would have won Hawthorn the game, and automatically sent them to the preliminary final. Hawthorn would be eliminated from the finals series following a loss in their semi-final match against the Western Bulldogs the following week.

From 2017 to 2019, Smith served as Co-Vice-Captain of the Hawks along with Liam Shiels, but both were replaced in that role prior to the 2019 season by Jack Gunston. Smith remained a member of Hawthorn's leadership group.

At the conclusion of the 2020 season, Smith exercised his rights as a free agent and moved to Geelong.

In 2022 Smith became the oldest player to win the Norm Smith Medal for best on ground in an AFL grand final during Geelong's grand final win over the Sydney Swans, posting 32 disposals and 12 marks to go along with 3 goals in the 81 point win.

On 10 August 2023, Smith announced his retirement from AFL, effective at the end of the season.

== Personal life ==
Smith completed a Masters of Business Administration at Swinburne University. Following his retirement, Smith transitioned into the Australian radio industry, joining Triple M as a part of its football programming team. At the conclusion of the 2026 AFL season, it was announced that Smith would leave Triple M to pursue breakfast radio at KIIS Network.

In September 2026, Smith was announced as co-host of KIIS 101.1 Melbourne's breakfast program, Ash, Issie & Elliot, alongside Ash London and stylist Elliot Garnaut. The program will launch in October 2026, replacing The Kyle & Jackie O Show in the Melbourne market.

== Statistics ==
Legend
G	Goals	K	Kicks	D	Disposals	T	Tackles
B	Behinds	H	Handballs	M	Marks
#	Played in that season's premiership team

Season	Team	No.	Games	Totals							Averages (per game)							Votes
Season	Team	No.	Games	G	B	K	H	D	M	T	G	B	K	H	D	M	T	Votes
2011	Hawthorn	16	16	20	9	178	123	301	100	40	1.3	0.6	11.1	7.7	18.8	6.3	2.5	1
2012	Hawthorn	16	22	17	13	222	164	386	95	86	0.8	0.6	10.1	7.5	17.5	4.3	3.9	0
2013^{#}	Hawthorn	16	24	18	16	286	193	479	112	82	0.8	0.7	11.9	8.0	20.0	4.7	3.4	5
2014^{#}	Hawthorn	16	24	24	15	337	203	540	133	68	1.0	0.6	14.0	8.5	22.5	5.5	2.8	4
2015^{#}	Hawthorn	16	25	23	12	350	231	581	163	70	0.9	0.6	14.0	9.2	23.2	6.5	2.8	3
2016	Hawthorn	16	24	9	16	335	206	541	139	66	0.4	0.7	14.0	8.6	22.5	5.8	2.8	4
2017	Hawthorn	16	22	14	12	313	187	500	130	65	0.6	0.5	14.2	8.5	22.7	5.9	3.0	2
2018	Hawthorn	16	24	26	14	311	213	524	143	61	1.1	0.6	13.0	8.9	21.8	6.0	2.5	6
2019	Hawthorn	16	19	9	8	273	154	427	100	41	0.5	0.4	14.4	8.1	22.5	5.3	2.2	0
2020 (Note: The 2020 season was played with 17 home-and-away matches per team (down from 22) and 16-minute quarters with time on (down from 20-minute quarters with time on) due to the impact of the COVID-19 pandemic.)	Hawthorn	16	10	5	2	100	73	173	35	21	0.5	0.2	10.0	7.3	17.3	3.5	2.1	3
2021	Geelong	7	24	15	9	383	167	550	166	38	0.6	0.4	16.0	7.0	22.9	6.9	1.6	1
2022^{#}	Geelong	7	24	15	22	339	178	517	161	31	0.6	0.9	14.1	7.4	21.5	6.7	1.3	5
2023	Geelong	7	22	10	12	326	147	473	139	36	0.5	0.5	14.8	6.7	21.5	6.3	1.6	0
Career.			280	205	160	3753	2239	5992	1616	705	0.7	0.6	13.4	8.0	21.4	5.8	2.5	34

== Honours and achievements ==
Team

- 3× AFL premiership player (Hawthorn): 2013, 2014, 2015
- AFL premiership player (Geelong): 2022
- 2× Minor premiership (Hawthorn): 2012, 2013
- Minor premiership (Geelong): 2022
- 2× McClelland Trophy (Hawthorn): 2012, 2013
- McClelland Trophy (Geelong): 2022

Individual

- Norm Smith Medal: 2022
- Hawthorn vice-captain: 2017–2019
- Peter Crimmins Medal third-place: 2018
- Hawthorn best clubman: 2016
- Hawthorn most promising player: 2013
- All-Stars team: 2020
- Hawthorn life member
