= Sam De Koning =

Australian rules player

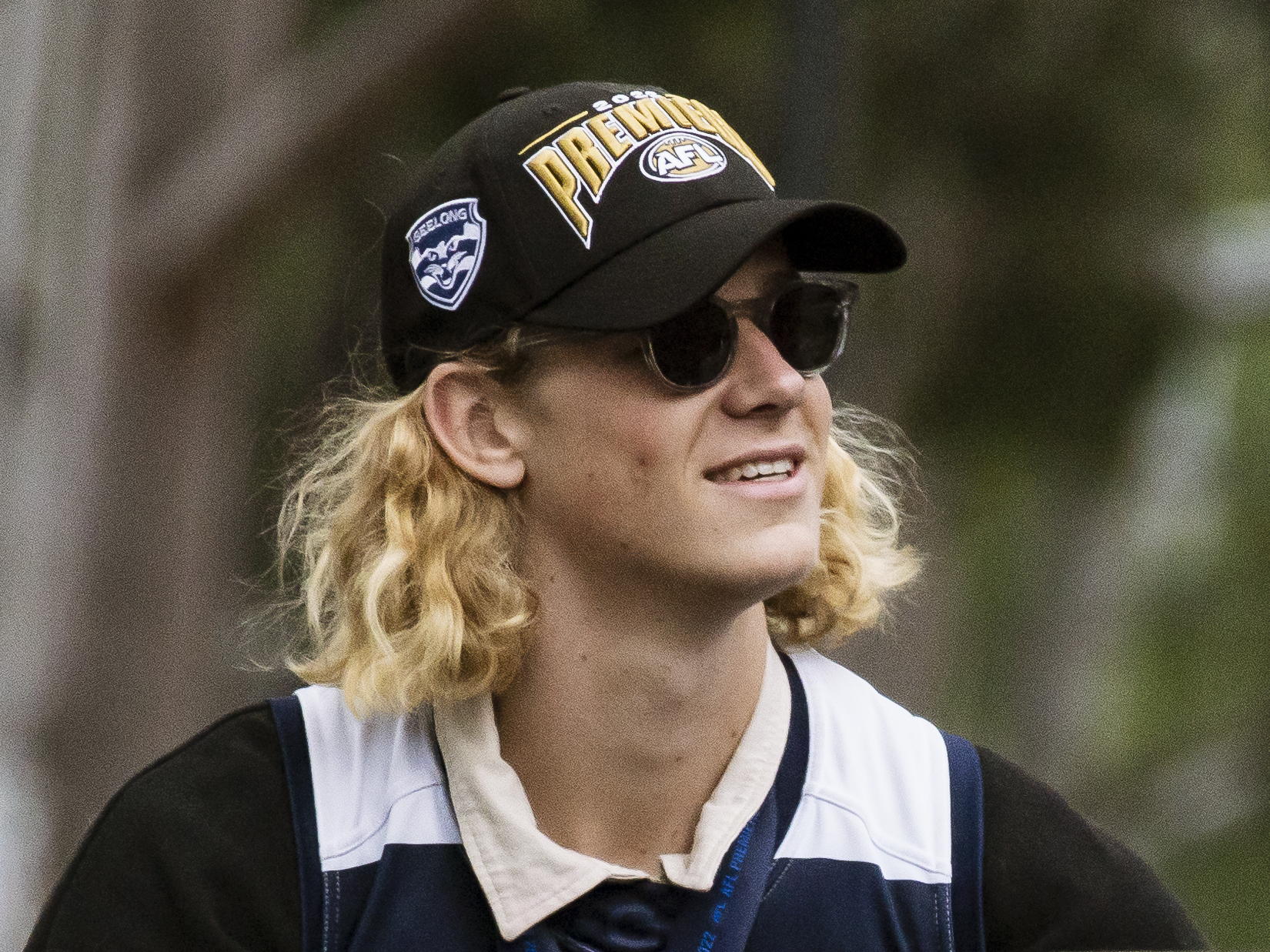
- De Koning in 2022

Personal information
- Full name: Sam De Koning
- Born: 26 February 2001 (age 25)
- Original team: Dandenong Stingrays
- Draft: 2019 / Round: 1 / Pick: 19
- Height: 204 cm (6 ft 8 in)
- Weight: 87 kg (192 lb)
- Position: Defender

Club information
- Current club: Geelong
- Number: 16

Playing career^{1}
Years	Club	Games (Goals)
2021–	Geelong	104 (8)
- ^{1} Playing statistics correct to the end of 2026.

Career highlights
- AFL premiership player: 2022; Geelong best young player: 2022; AFL Rising Star nominee: 2022; 2x 22under22 team: 2022 2023

Sam De Koning (/ˈkoʊnɪŋ/ KOH-ning; born 26 February 2001) is an Australian rules footballer who plays for the Geelong Football Club in the Australian Football League. He made his debut in the round 5 of the 2021 AFL season between Geelong and North Melbourne at GMHBA Stadium.

De Koning - often referred to as Bontempelli 2.0 - became a premiership player in the 2022 AFL Grand Final, which was just his 24th game, polling one vote to come fourth in Norm Smith Medal voting for his strong work as a loose defender, and kicking his first career goal late in the match.

== Family life ==
De Koning is the son of Terry De Koning, who played for Footscray in the 1980s. He is the ninth eldest in a blended family of ten children, and his immediate elder brother is St Kilda footballer Tom De Koning.

== Statistics ==
Updated to the end of round 22, 2026.

Legend
G	Goals	K	Kicks	D	Disposals	T	Tackles
B	Behinds	H	Handballs	M	Marks
#	Played in that season's premiership team

Season	Team	No.	Games	Totals							Averages (per game)							Votes
Season	Team	No.	Games	G	B	K	H	D	M	T	G	B	K	H	D	M	T	Votes
2020 (Note: The 2020 season was played with 17 home-and-away matches per team (down from 22) and 16-minute quarters with time on (down from 20-minute quarters with time on) due to the impact of the COVID-19 pandemic.)	Geelong	16	0	—	—	—	—	—	—	—	—	—	—	—	—	—	—	0
2021	Geelong	16	1	0	2	7	1	8	3	0	0.0	2.0	7.0	1.0	8.0	3.0	0.0	0
2022^{#}	Geelong	16	23	1	0	143	138	281	120	6	0.0	0.0	6.2	6.0	12.2	5.2	0.3	0
2023	Geelong	16	19	0	0	129	105	234	86	11	0.0	0.0	6.8	5.5	12.3	4.5	0.6	0
2024	Geelong	16	19	3	0	123	154	277	64	26	0.2	0.0	6.5	8.1	14.6	3.4	1.4	0
2025	Geelong	16	23	3	1	169	140	309	115	23	0.1	0.0	7.3	6.1	13.4	5.0	1.0	2
2026	Geelong	16	18	1	1	104	155	259	65	29	0.1	0.1	5.8	8.6	14.4	3.6	1.6	0
Career			103	8	4	675	693	1368	453	95	0.1	0.0	6.6	6.7	13.3	4.4	0.9	2

== Honours and achievements ==
Team

- AFL premiership player (Geelong): 2022
- McClelland Trophy (Geelong): 2022

Individual

- Geelong F.C. Best Young Player Award: 2022
- AFL Rising Star nominee: 2022 (round 11)
