= Matthew Ling =

Australian football league player (born 1999)

Personal information
- Born: 21 April 1999 (age 27); Geelong, Victoria
- Original team: Geelong Falcons
- Draft: No. 14, 2017 AFL draft, Sydney
- Debut: 25 July 2020, Sydney vs. Hawthorn, at Sydney Cricket Ground
- Height: 184 cm (6 ft 0 in)
- Weight: 79 kg (174 lb)
- Position: Defender

Playing career^{1}
Years	Club	Games (Goals)
2018–2021	Sydney	4 (0)
- ^{1} Playing statistics correct to the end of 2021.

Matthew Ling (born 21 April 1999) is an Australian rules footballer who currently plays for Norwood Football Club in the South Australian Nation Football League and played for the Sydney Swans in Australian Football League (AFL). He was recruited by Sydney Swans with the 14th draft pick in the 2017 AFL draft. After his release from the Swans at the conclusion of the 2021 season, Ling returned to the area he was drafted from to play for Geelong VFL.

== Early football ==
Ling played for the Geelong Falcons in the NAB League for two seasons, picking up 250 disposals in total for the second season, where he played 14 games. He also played for Vic Country in the AFL Under 18 Championships for the 2017 season.

== AFL career ==
After an injury-plagued first two years which saw Ling limited to just 16 games in the NEAFL for the 2018 and 2019 seasons, Ling debuted in the 8th round of the 2020 AFL season, against the Hawthorn Football Club. Ling picked up 10 disposals, 3 marks and 2 tackles on his debut. Ling was delisted by the Swans at the conclusion of the 2021 season.

== Statistics ==
Statistics are correct to the end of 2021

Legend
G	Goals	K	Kicks	D	Disposals	T	Tackles
B	Behinds	H	Handballs	M	Marks

Season	Team	No.	Games	Totals							Averages (per game)						
Season	Team	No.	Games	G	B	K	H	D	M	T	G	B	K	H	D	M	T
2018	Sydney	19	0	—	—	—	—	—	—	—	—	—	—	—	—	—	—
2019	Sydney	19	0	—	—	—	—	—	—	—	—	—	—	—	—	—	—
2020 (Note: The 2020 season was played with 17 home-and-away matches per team (down from 22) and 16-minute quarters with time on (down from 20-minute quarters with time on) due to the impact of the COVID-19 pandemic.)	Sydney	19	3	0	0	20	6	26	5	2	0.0	0.0	6.7	2.0	8.7	1.7	0.7
2021	Sydney	19	1	—	—	—	—	—	—	—	—	—	—	—	—	—	—
Career			4	0	0	20	6	26	5	2	0.0	0.0	6.7	2.0	8.7	1.7	0.7
