= Tyson Stengle =

Australian rules footballer (born 1998)

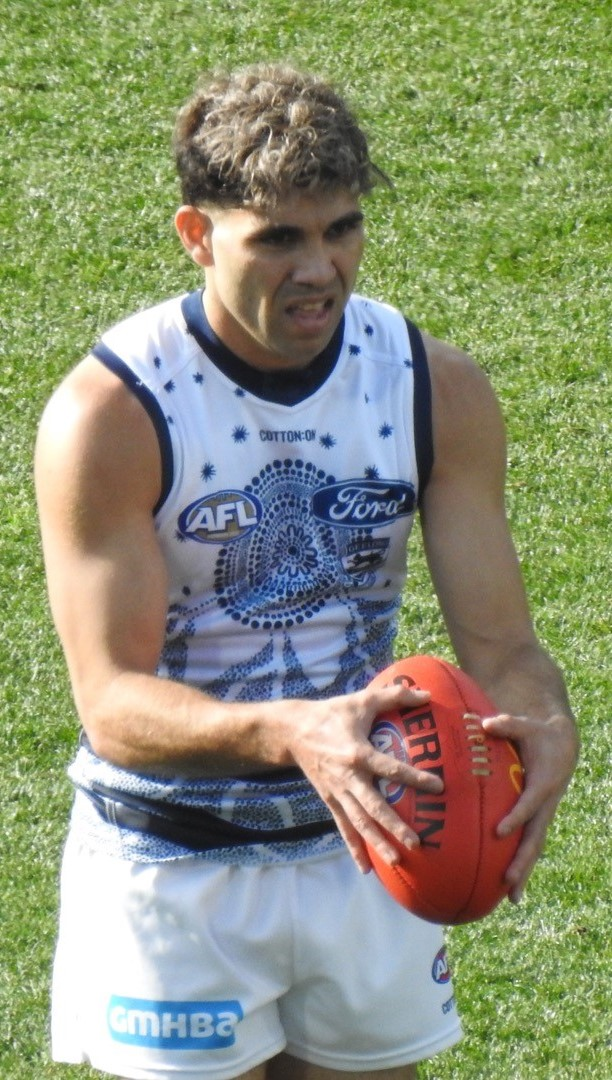
- Tyson Stengle in 2023

Personal information
- Full name: Tyson Stengle
- Nicknames: Wombo, Wombat
- Born: 19 October 1998 (age 28)
- Original team: Woodville-West Torrens (SANFL)
- Draft: No. 6, 2017 AFL rookie draft: Richmond
- Debut: Round 15, 2017, Richmond vs. Port Adelaide, at Adelaide Oval
- Height: 175 cm (5 ft 9 in)
- Weight: 73 kg (161 lb)
- Position: Forward

Playing career
| Years | Club | Games (Goals) |
| 2017 | Richmond | 2 (2) |
| 2019–2020 | Adelaide | 14 (13) |
| 2022–2026 | Geelong | 93 (160) |
| Total | | 109 (175) |

Representative team honours
| Years | Team | Games (Goals) |
| 2025 | Indigenous All-Stars | 1 (1) |

Career highlights
- AFL premiership player: 2022; All-Australian: 2022; SANFL premiership player: 2021

Tyson Stengle (born 19 October 1998) is a former professional Australian rules footballer who played for Richmond, Adelaide and Geelong in the Australian Football League (AFL). Stengle played junior representative football with Woodville-West Torrens in the SANFL and represented South Australia at national championships at under-18 level. He was drafted by the Richmond Tigers in the 2017 rookie draft, made his AFL debut in round 15, 2017, and was traded to the Adelaide Crows in the 2018 trade period. He was delisted by Adelaide prior to the 2021 AFL season, but proceeded to join the Geelong Cats in 2022, playing in the premiership team that year. Stengle lives with Eddie Betts in Melbourne.

== Early life and junior football ==
Stengle was taken in by his grandmother, Debra, at the age of four after he and his brother were removed by the state from the care of their parents. He later lived with grandparents Emily and Cecil Betts after Debra died. He spent his teenage years in the northwestern Adelaide suburb of Ethelton where he completed secondary schooling at Le Fevre High School.

Stengle first played football for the local Portland Football Club at under-10s level. There he played in over 100 matches across his junior years.

As a teenager, he was a member of Port Adelaide's Aboriginal AFL Academy.

Stengle played state-league football with Woodville-West Torrens in the South Australian National Football League. He played 10 matches for the reserves team in 2016 and kicked 22 goals, and kicked 13 in nine matches with the club's Under 18 team that same season. He was a member of the Eagles' reserves Grand Final team in 2016.

In 2016 he represented South Australia at the National Under 18 Championships. There he ranked second among all small forwards for Champion Data ranking points per game. Stengle was also the fourth-ranked of all South Australians by the same measure that tournament. He was labelled "quick, creative, innovative and classy" by The Age draft writer Emma Quayle for his performances in the championships. The Advertiser's Andrew Capel said Stengle possessed "brilliant skills, blistering pace and a love of tackling and applying ferocious forward pressure." Stengle recorded a top-10 score in the goalkicking test at the national draft combine in 2016.

== AFL career ==
=== Richmond (2017–2018) ===
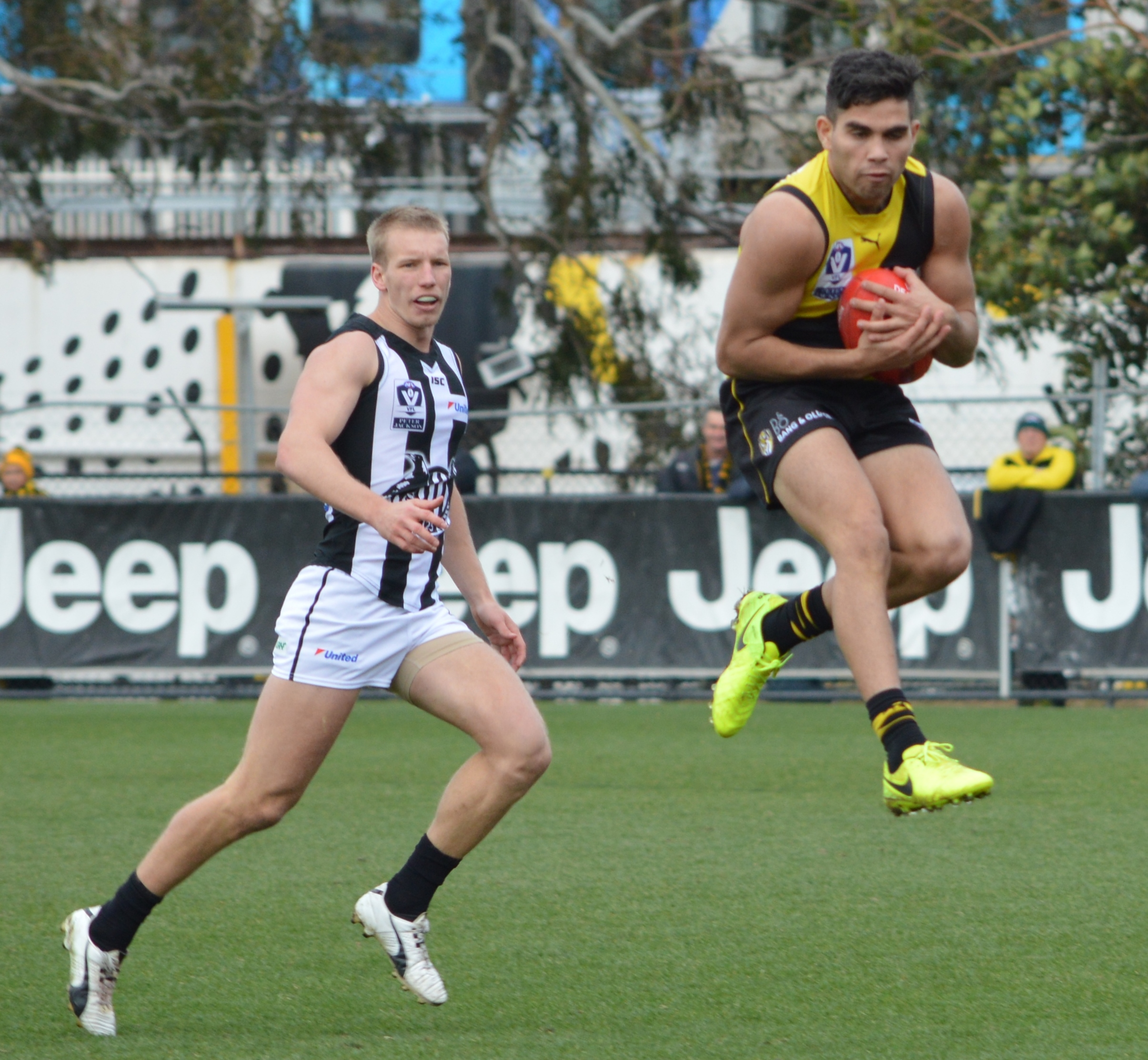
Stengle marks ahead of Collingwood's Josh Smith during VFL match in July 2017

Stengle was drafted by Richmond with the club's first pick and the sixth selection overall in the 2017 AFL rookie draft.

Stengle played in the early part of the 2017 season with Richmond's reserves side in the VFL. He played as a forward for the side, kicking 13 goals in his first eight matches. He was upgraded to the club's senior list in June 2017. He made his AFL debut two weeks later in Richmond's round 15 win over Port Adelaide at the Adelaide Oval where he kicked two goals in the match. He played again the following match but was omitted from the team's round 17 side to play the week after. From there he returned to the club's reserves side, playing with the team through to their finals campaign. There he played in each of their three victories, and in the team's losing grand final against Port Melbourne. Stengle finished the 2017 season having played two matches and kicked two goals at senior level. He also played 19 matches in the reserves and kicked 33 goals, good for the second most at the club and sixth most in the league.

In February 2018, Stengle was selected alongside most of the club's younger players to represent Richmond at the Sydney tournament of the AFLX exhibition series. He started the season with the club's reserves side and performed strongly at that level, recording 20 disposals and three goals in round 1. By round 5 he was named as an emergency for the AFL team, but ultimately went unselected at the top level. In mid-May, Stengle kicked three goals in the third quarter of a VFL match against North Melbourne and was again named an AFL emergency the following week. He began playing limited midfield minutes in VFL matches from June, adding positional versatility to his predominantly forward-line role. In mid-July, Stengle kicked six goals and gathered 24 disposals in Richmond's VFL win over North Melbourne. For that performance, he was noted by head coach Damien Hardwick as one of the club's best VFL performers, but went again unselected for senior football. To that point he had played 13 matches at the lower level for a total of 26 goals, the most for any Richmond player and the sixth most of any player in that league. Two weeks later Stengle suffered a minor ankle injury while playing in a VFL match against Werribee. He missed the second half of the match due to the injury as well as one further match while rehabilitating the injury. Stengle finished the home-and-away VFL season with 33 goals, good for eighth most of any player in the league. He did not add to that tally in the VFL finals series, however, when Richmond's reserves side were eliminated following consecutive losses to Williamstown and Essendon. He won the club's reserves goal-kicking medal for his 33 goals over 19 matches in the VFL, but failed to earn an AFL match in 2018.

In the off-season that followed, Stengle became the focus of trade speculation, with an AFL Media report in mid-September claiming that he was delaying acceptance of a two-year contract extension at Richmond while weighing up rival interest from Adelaide. Less than a week out from the beginning of the trade period, Stengle requested a trade to Adelaide citing a lack of AFL-level opportunity during his time at Richmond.

=== Adelaide (2019–2020) ===
On the penultimate day of the 2018 trade period Stengle was traded to Adelaide in exchange for a fourth-round draft selection in pick 68.

Stengle's career with the Adelaide Football Club ended when he was delisted on 17 March 2021 prior to the 2021 AFL season as a result of a settlement relating to off-field incidents.

=== 2021 ===
In 2021, Stengle returned to his original club, the Woodville West Torrens Eagles, playing in their back-to-back SANFL premiership, which led to interest from AFL clubs.

On 5 November 2021, Stengle signed with Geelong as a delisted free agent.

=== Geelong (2022–) ===
After signing with Geelong as a delisted free agent at the end of 2021, Stengle made his club debut in round 1 against Essendon, kicking a career-high four goals. He played all 22 games of the home-and-away season and kicked 46 goals, finishing 12th in the Coleman Medal. He earned selection as a forward pocket in the 2022 All-Australian team and played in Geelong's 2022 premiership team.

In 2023, Stengle played 19 games and kicked 27 goals, returning from mid-season injuries to maintain his place in Geelong's forward line.

On 30 June 2024, Stengle signed a five-year contract extension with Geelong, keeping him at the club until 2029. He finished the 2024 season with 46 goals in 25 games and was named in the 44-man All-Australian squad.

During the 2025 season, Stengle played his 100th AFL game and remained a regular in Geelong's forward line. He kicked 34 goals, recorded 24 goal assists (sixth in the league), and finished second in the AFL for tackles inside 50. After a standout three-goal haul against Hawthorn in the Preliminary Final, his season culminated in Geelong's 2025 AFL Grand Final loss to Brisbane.

Stengle faced off-field issues in 2026 and was placed under the AFL's medical model, missing periods of the pre-season and the first half of the year. He returned to play via the VFL in June but missed a scheduled flight for a subsequent match against Southport after reportedly being sighted at a Prahran nightclub days prior. Following the incident, Geelong coach Chris Scott stated that Stengle was "miles off" being available for senior selection. While expressing sympathy for the player's welfare and acknowledging the difficulty of elite football, Scott emphasized the club's performance expectations, noting, "there are limits to where our empathy takes us because we're not a charity, as much as we'd like to be." On 31 July 2026, Geelong and Stengle reached a settlement for the termination of Stengle's contract, and he officially left the club.

== Statistics ==
Updated to the end of the 2025 season.

Legend
| G | Goals | K | Kicks | D | Disposals | T | Tackles |
| B | Behinds | H | Handballs | M | Marks |

| Season | Team | No. | Games | Totals | | | | | | | Averages (per game) | | | | | | | Votes |
| Season | Team | No. | Games | G | B | K | H | D | M | T | G | B | K | H | D | M | T | Votes |
|---|---|---|---|---|---|---|---|---|---|---|---|---|---|---|---|---|---|---|
| 2017 | Richmond | 44 | 2 | 2 | 1 | 11 | 5 | 16 | 4 | 4 | 1.0 | 0.5 | 5.5 | 2.5 | 8.0 | 2.0 | 2.0 | 0 |
| 2018 | | 44 | 0 | — | — | — | — | — | — | — | — | — | — | — | — | — | — | 0 |
| 2019 | Adelaide | 17 | 2 | 5 | 1 | 14 | 3 | 17 | 5 | 7 | 2.5 | 0.5 | 7.0 | 1.5 | 8.5 | 2.5 | 3.5 | 0 |
| 2020 (Note: The 2020 season was played with 17 home-and-away matches per team (down from 22) and 16-minute quarters with time on (down from 20-minute quarters with time on) due to the impact of the COVID-19 pandemic.) | Adelaide | 18 | 12 | 8 | 9 | 66 | 51 | 117 | 20 | 25 | 0.7 | 0.8 | 5.5 | 4.3 | 9.8 | 1.7 | 2.1 | 0 |
| 2022 | Geelong | 18 | 25 | 53 | 27 | 247 | 114 | 361 | 82 | 64 | 2.1 | 1.1 | 9.9 | 4.6 | 14.4 | 3.3 | 2.6 | 6 |
| 2023 | Geelong | 18 | 19 | 27 | 9 | 146 | 71 | 217 | 48 | 42 | 1.4 | 0.5 | 7.7 | 3.7 | 11.4 | 2.5 | 2.2 | 2 |
| 2024 | Geelong | 18 | 25 | 46 | 18 | 222 | 113 | 335 | 68 | 58 | 1.8 | 0.7 | 8.9 | 4.5 | 13.4 | 2.7 | 2.3 | 2 |
| 2025 | Geelong | 18 | 24 | 34 | 32 | 195 | 102 | 297 | 73 | 73 | 1.4 | 1.3 | 8.1 | 4.3 | 12.4 | 3.0 | 3.0 | 2 |
| Career | | | 109 | 175 | 97 | 901 | 459 | 1360 | 300 | 273 | 1.6 | 0.9 | 8.3 | 4.2 | 12.5 | 2.8 | 2.5 | 12 |

== Honours and achievements ==
Team

- AFL premiership player (Geelong): 2022
- McClelland Trophy (Richmond): 2018
- McClelland Trophy (Geelong): 2022
- SANFL premiership player (Woodville-West Torrens): 2021

Individual

- All-Australian team: 2022

== Family ==
Stengle is nephew to former Sydney Swans forward Michael O'Loughlin. He is also related to former AFL players Eddie Betts, Ricky O'Loughlin and Terry Milera.

== Legal issues ==
On 17 April 2020, Stengle was reported for drunk driving after being stopped by police in Adelaide’s south-western suburbs. He was caught driving an unregistered car and subsequently recorded a blood alcohol reading of 0.125. Adelaide Football Club responded by suspending him for 4 AFL matches (rounds 2 to 5) and fining him $2,500. The case went before the Adelaide Magistrates Court at 10 am on 31 August 2020, but he declined compulsory attendance, choosing instead to attend a Crows training session. The matter was rescheduled for October.

Subsequently, at 5:15 am on 28 September 2020, police stopped a taxi containing Stengle and ex-Crows teammate Brad Crouch and found an illicit drug, understood to be cocaine. Both men issued apologies. The AFL investigated and found the pair guilty of 'conduct unbecoming'. Crouch was suspended for 2 matches, and Stengle for 4 (a greater penalty for his second offence). With their season already complete, these bans came into effect at the beginning of the 2021 season.

SA Police chose not to charge Stengle and Crouch over the drug bust, instead referring them to counselling under a drug diversion program. On 23 October 2020, Stengle pleaded guilty to his drink driving charge in the Adelaide Magistrates Court. He was fined a total of $1,671 ($900 drink driving, $300 unlicensed, $471 unregistered) and had his 6-month driving licence suspension extended by a day.
