= Jed Bews =

Australian rules footballer

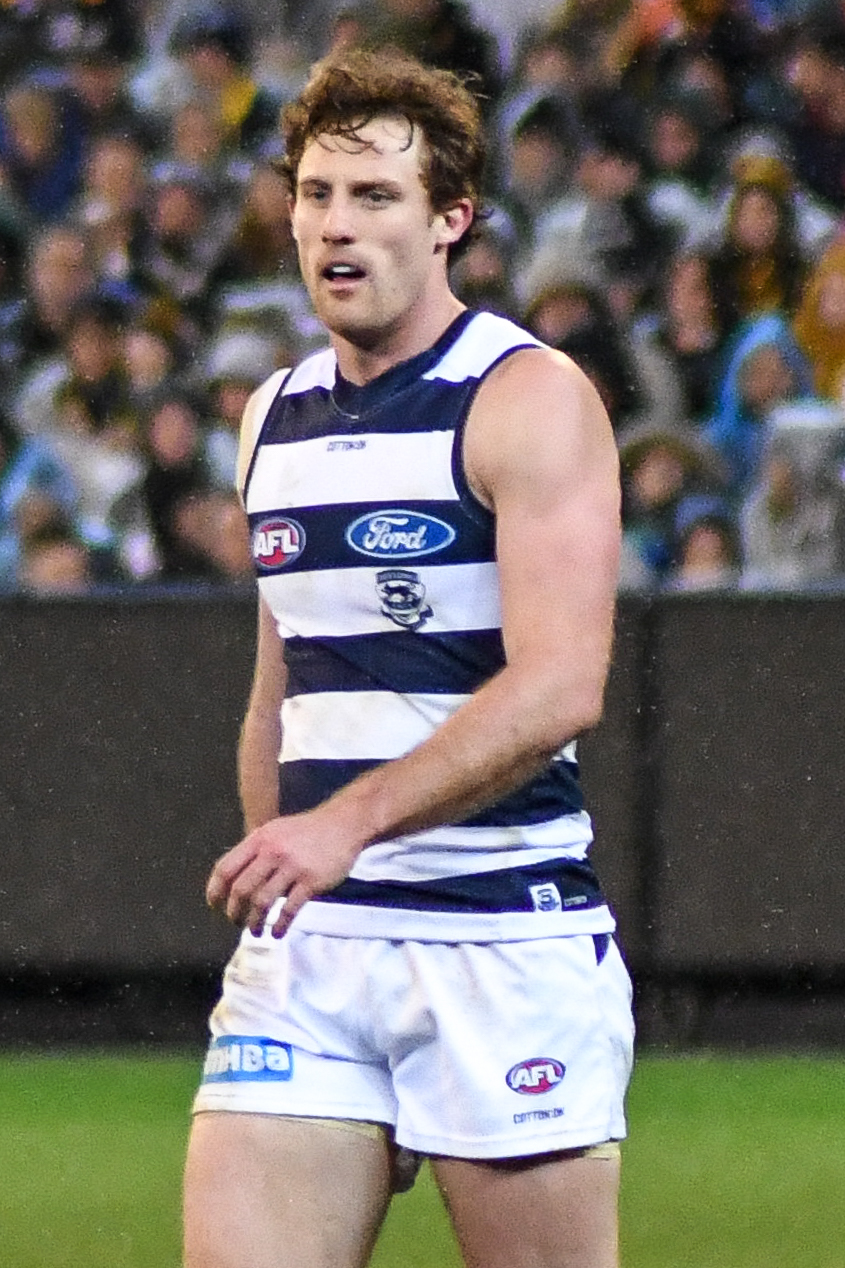
- Bews playing for Geelong in August 2018

Personal information
- Full name: Jed Bews
- Born: 14 December 1993 (age 32)
- Original teams: Leopold (GFL); Geelong Falcons (TAC Cup)
- Draft: No. 86 (F/S), 2011 national draft
- Height: 186 cm (6 ft 1 in)
- Weight: 88 kg (13 st 12 lb)
- Position: Defender

Club information
- Current club: Geelong
- Number: 24

Playing career^{1}
Years	Club	Games (Goals)
2014–2026	Geelong	175 (16)
- ^{1} Playing statistics correct to the end of the 2026 season.

Career highlights
- AFL Premiership Player: (2022)

Jed Bews (born 14 December 1993) is an Australian rules footballer who last played for the Geelong Football Club in the Australian Football League (AFL).

He was drafted with the 86th pick in the 2011 AFL draft under the father–son rule. His father, Andrew Bews, also played for Geelong, wearing the number 27. Jed was offered that number but decided against it, and was given number 24. Jed made his AFL debut in round 9 of the 2014 season against Fremantle. He has played primarily as a defender, standing 186 centimetres or 6 feet 1 inch tall and weighing 88 kilograms or 13 stone 12 pounds.

Prior to being drafted, Bews was a talented young athlete who competed as a pole vaulter, becoming a junior national champion and posting a best jump of 4.65 metres.

Bews did not feature in Geelong's AFL team during the 2026 AFL season, instead spending the season in the club's VFL team. He would play 16 matches in the VFL competition that year, part of the Geelong team that won the minor premiership only losing two matches. Bews' final appearance for Geelong was the 2026 VFL Grand Final where the Cats were beaten by Box Hill.

Bews was awarded life membership of the Geelong Football Club in 2024.

== Statistics ==
Updated to the end of the 2025 season.

Legend
G	Goals	K	Kicks	D	Disposals	T	Tackles
B	Behinds	H	Handballs	M	Marks

Season	Team	No.	Games	Totals							Averages (per game)							Votes
Season	Team	No.	Games	G	B	K	H	D	M	T	G	B	K	H	D	M	T	Votes
2014	Geelong	24	7	0	0	30	30	60	17	25	0.0	0.0	4.3	4.3	8.6	2.4	3.6	0
2015	Geelong	24	16	1	2	70	85	155	35	50	0.1	0.1	4.4	5.3	9.7	2.2	3.1	0
2016	Geelong	24	8	0	2	51	48	99	35	21	0.0	0.3	6.4	6.0	12.4	4.4	2.6	0
2017	Geelong	24	19	3	2	128	108	236	64	58	0.2	0.1	6.7	5.7	12.4	3.4	3.1	0
2018	Geelong	24	21	2	2	124	106	230	72	37	0.1	0.1	5.9	5.0	11.0	3.4	1.8	0
2019	Geelong	24	12	3	3	94	35	129	33	30	0.3	0.3	7.8	2.9	10.8	2.8	2.5	0
2020 (Note: The 2020 season was played with 17 home-and-away matches per team (down from 22) and 16-minute quarters with time on (down from 20-minute quarters with time on) due to the impact of the COVID-19 pandemic.)	Geelong	24	20	3	2	146	72	218	65	35	0.2	0.1	7.3	3.6	10.9	3.3	1.8	1
2021	Geelong	24	25	3	2	219	125	344	116	50	0.1	0.1	8.8	5.0	13.8	4.6	2.0	0
2022^{#}	Geelong	24	23	1	2	134	115	249	79	43	0.0	0.1	5.8	5.0	10.8	3.4	1.9	0
2023	Geelong	24	15	0	1	79	78	157	36	30	0.0	0.1	5.3	5.2	10.5	2.4	2.0	0
2024	Geelong	24	5	0	0	31	19	50	20	7	0.0	0.0	6.2	3.8	10.0	4.0	1.4	0
2025	Geelong	24	4	0	0	38	18	56	24	7	0.0	0.0	9.5	4.5	14.0	6.0	1.8	0
Career			175	16	18	1144	839	1983	596	393	0.1	0.1	6.5	4.8	11.3	3.4	2.2	1

== Honours and achievements ==
Team

- AFL premiership player (Geelong): 2022
- 2× McClelland Trophy (Geelong): 2019, 2022
