= Jake Kolodjashnij =

Australian rules footballer

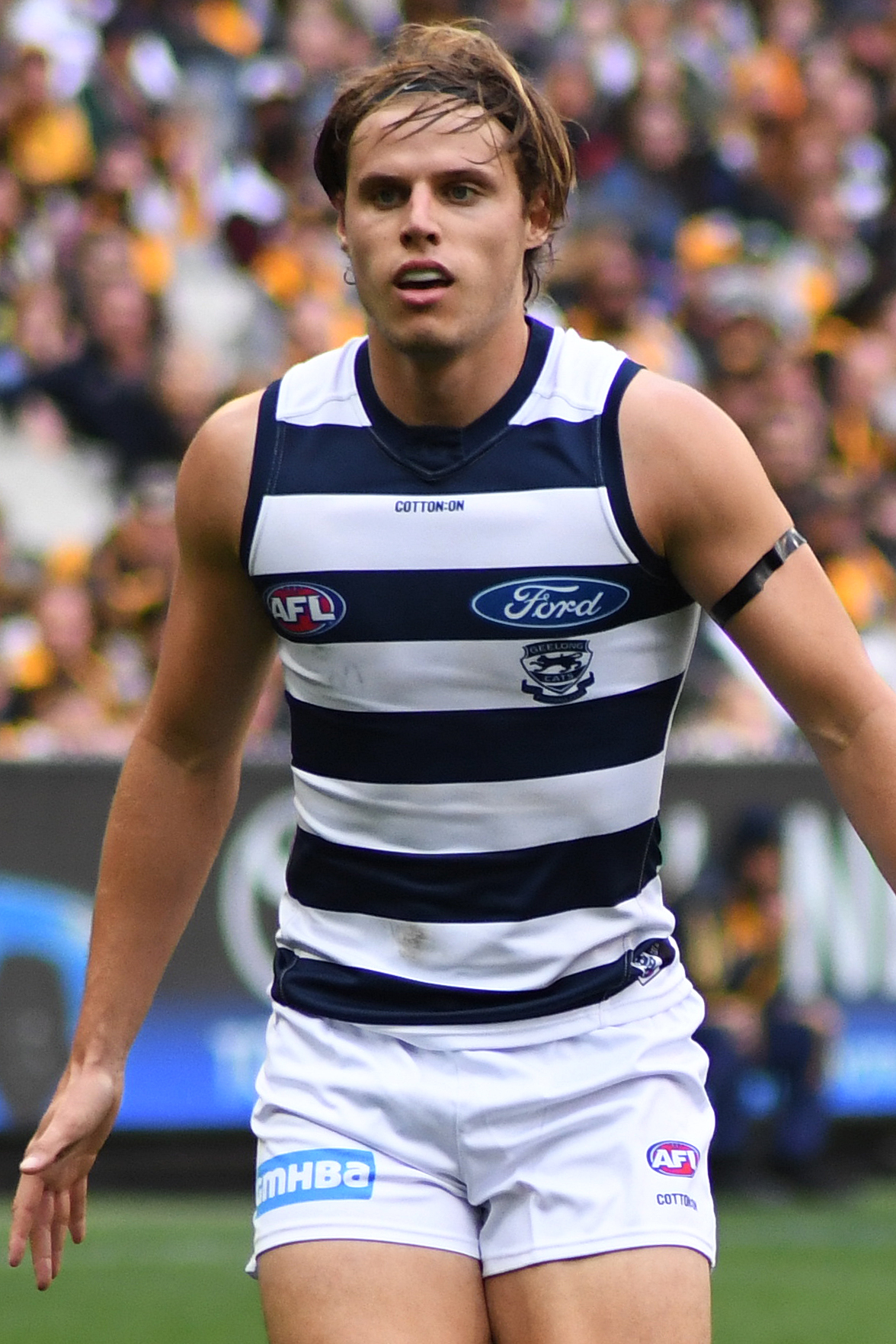
- Kolodjashnij playing for Geelong in April 2019

Personal information
- Full name: Jake Kolodjashnij
- Born: 9 August 1995 (age 31); Launceston, Tasmania
- Original team: Launceston (TSL)
- Draft: No. 41, 2013 national draft
- Height: 195 cm (6 ft 5 in)
- Weight: 94 kg (207 lb)
- Position: Key defender

Club information
- Current club: Geelong
- Number: 8

Playing career^{1}
Years	Club	Games (Goals)
2015–2026	Geelong	209 (5)
- ^{1} Playing statistics correct to the end of 2026.

Career highlights
- AFL premiership player: 2022; Geelong best young player: 2016

Jake Kolodjashnij (/kɒləˈdʒæzniː/, ko-lə-JAZ-nee; Ukrainian: Джейк Колоджашній; born 9 August 1995) is a former professional Australian rules footballer, who last played for the Geelong Football Club in the Australian Football League.

== Early life ==
Kolodjashnij grew up in Tasmania where he played soccer and basketball in his younger years. His grandparents fled Soviet Ukraine after World War II and settled in Australia. Kolodjashnij's twin brother Kade also played football professionally, first playing for the Gold Coast Suns (78 games), and with the Melbourne Football Club (2 games) before retiring in 2020 due to concussion issues.

He attended St Patrick's College, Launceston.

Kolodjashnij began playing Australian football for the first time at 12 years of age for the Prospect Junior Football Club. Kolodjashnij lived across the road from Prospect Park, a multi-use venue for both soccer and Australian football. He and brother Kade played in junior premierships for Prospect in under-13s and under-14s of the Northern Tasmanian Junior Football Association. In his under-15 season with Prospect he and Kade were referred to Tasmanian head coach, and former AFL player, Matthew Armstrong, for consideration for the Tasmanian talented player pathway and were recognised as having significant potential. As part of the talented player pathway process, both the Kolodjashnij brothers were permitted to Tasmanian State League club, Launceston, for their under-16 year. Jake played for Tasmania in the under-16 National Championship in 2011 and followed that with selection in the under-18 National Championships in both 2012 and 2013. He was taken with the 41st pick in the 2013 AFL draft by the Geelong Football Club.

== AFL career ==
Kolodjashnij is a defender selected by Geelong in the 2013 NAB AFL Draft. He plays as a rebounding defender and an overhead mark. In the previous year, he played 16 VFL games and finished fourth in the Victorian Football League best and fairest. He made his AFL debut in round 12 of the 2015 season against Melbourne.

Kolodjashnij was part of Geelong's 2022 premiership team that defeated Sydney by 81 points.

In 2026, Kolodjashnij was at the centre of a major scandal for the club, having been asked by Geelong to sign a waiver to absolve them of any responsibility for future potential concussions, with Kolodjashnij having suffered multiple concussions in his career to that stage.

Following the end of the 2026 season, Kolodjashnij retired from professional football on medical grounds.

== Personal life ==
Kolodjashnij currently studies a Bachelor of Commerce at Deakin University.

== Statistics ==
Updated to the end of round 22, 2026.

Legend
G	Goals	K	Kicks	D	Disposals	T	Tackles
B	Behinds	H	Handballs	M	Marks
#	Played in that season's premiership team

Season	Team	No.	Games	Totals							Averages (per game)							Votes
Season	Team	No.	Games	G	B	K	H	D	M	T	G	B	K	H	D	M	T	Votes
2015	Geelong	8	9	0	1	58	68	126	34	25	0.0	0.1	6.4	7.6	14.0	3.8	2.8	0
2016	Geelong	8	20	0	0	126	106	232	75	48	0.0	0.0	6.3	5.3	11.6	3.8	2.4	0
2017	Geelong	8	18	0	3	132	131	263	79	43	0.0	0.2	7.3	7.3	14.6	4.4	2.4	0
2018	Geelong	8	23	0	2	154	136	290	95	42	0.0	0.1	6.7	5.9	12.6	4.1	1.8	0
2019	Geelong	8	23	0	1	167	86	253	109	33	0.0	0.0	7.3	3.7	11.0	4.7	1.4	0
2020 (Note: The 2020 season was played with 17 home-and-away matches per team (down from 22) and 16-minute quarters with time on (down from 20-minute quarters with time on) due to the impact of the COVID-19 pandemic.)	Geelong	8	17	0	3	125	52	177	77	25	0.0	0.2	7.4	3.1	10.4	4.5	1.5	0
2021	Geelong	8	22	1	0	165	104	269	120	27	0.0	0.0	7.5	4.7	12.2	5.5	1.2	0
2022^{#}	Geelong	8	23	2	0	165	111	276	107	33	0.1	0.0	7.2	4.8	12.0	4.7	1.4	0
2023	Geelong	8	19	0	3	136	82	218	89	29	0.0	0.2	7.2	4.3	11.5	4.7	1.5	0
2024	Geelong	8	24	1	1	203	124	327	123	47	0.0	0.0	8.5	5.2	13.6	5.1	2.0	0
2025	Geelong	8	0	—	—	—	—	—	—	—	—	—	—	—	—	—	—	0
2026	Geelong	8	11	1	0	76	55	131	44	10	0.1	0.0	6.9	5.0	11.9	4.0	0.9	0
Career			209	5	14	1507	1055	2562	952	362	0.0	0.1	7.2	5.0	12.3	4.6	1.7	0

== Honours and achievements ==
Team

- AFL premiership player (Geelong): 2022
- 2× McClelland Trophy (Geelong): 2019, 2022

Individual

- Geelong F.C. Best Young Player Award: 2016
