= Rhys Stanley =

Australian rules footballer

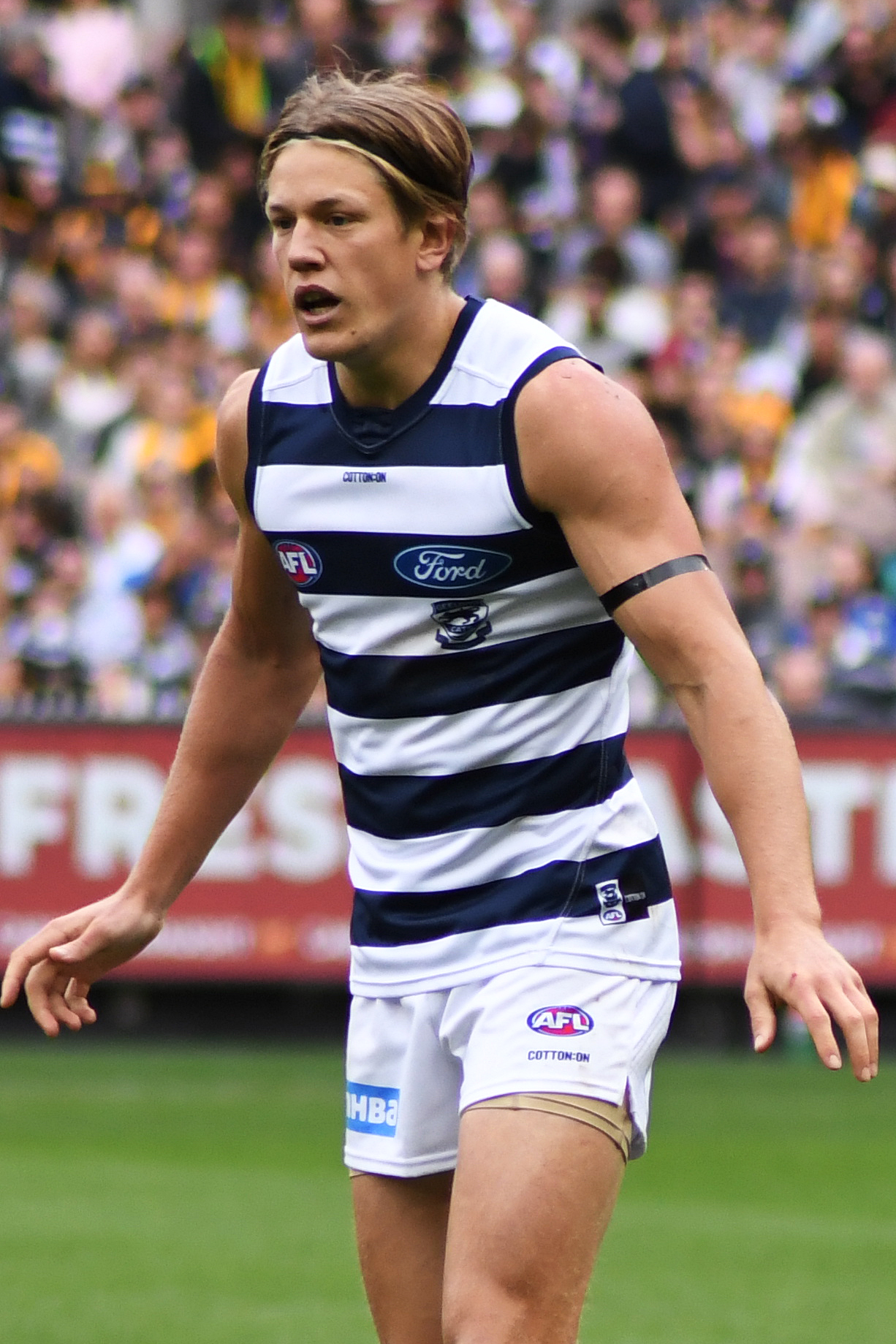
- Stanley playing for Geelong in April 2019

Personal information
- Full name: Rhys Stanley
- Born: 1 December 1990 (age 35); Berri, South Australia
- Original team: West Adelaide (SANFL)
- Draft: No. 47, 2008 national draft
- Height: 200 cm (6 ft 7 in)
- Weight: 102 kg (225 lb)
- Position: Ruckman / Forward

Playing career^{1}
Years	Club	Games (Goals)
2009–2014	St Kilda	58 (40)
2015–2026	Geelong	172 (75)
Total		230 (115)
- ^{1} Playing statistics correct to the end of the 2026 season.

Career highlights
- AFL premiership player: 2022

Rhys Stanley (born 1 December 1990) is a former professional Australian rules footballer who played for the St Kilda Football Club and the Geelong Football Club in the Australian Football League (AFL).

He played little football growing up but impressed with South Australia in the AFL Under 18 championships and in two senior games for West Adelaide.

== AFL career ==
=== St Kilda (2009–2014) ===
Stanley was recruited from West Adelaide SANFL club with pick 47 in the 2008 AFL draft.

Stanley spent his first AFL season developing with St Kilda's VFL affiliate team Sandringham. He won the 2009 AFL Grand Final Sprint.

In 2010, Stanley played in St Kilda's opening 2010 NAB Cup match against Collingwood, kicking one goal. On 23 May 2010, he made his official debut in Round 9 of the home and away season in which St Kilda defeated the West Coast Eagles at Subiaco. He had nine disposals, three marks, four kicks and five handballs. Stanley played seven games for St Kilda in 2010, with a total of 53 disposals and four goals. From rounds 9 to 14, he played in a tall forward role, helping St Kilda to win all six of these games while the captain, Nick Riewoldt, recovered from a hamstring tear.

Stanley played two games for St Kilda in 2011.

By the end of his tenure at St Kilda, Stanley played 58 games and kicked 40 goals.

=== Geelong (2015–2026) ===
Stanley was traded to Geelong, along with pick 60 for pick 21 in the 2014 AFL national draft.

On 12 April 2015, Stanley made his Geelong Cats debut in the second round of the season against the Fremantle Dockers where they were defeated by 44 points but won his first game as a Geelong player in the following round against the Gold Coast Suns. He played six more games in the 2015 season before cementing his spot as the club's first choice ruck for the 2016 season.

Since joining Geelong in 2015, Stanley has been selected to play in two AFL grand finals, a loss in 2020 against the Richmond Tigers and a premiership victory in 2022 against the Sydney Swans in which he had 16 disposals and 27 hit outs.

In late 2021, Stanley signed a two-year extension to remain at the Geelong Football Club until the end of 2023, taking him to his eighth season at the club and thirteenth as an AFL player.

Stanley was a member of Geelong's premiership winning team that won the 2022 AFL Grand Final by 81 points over the Sydney Swans.

Stanley retired from the AFL at the end of the 2026 AFL season, after 230 games and 18 seasons across his two clubs.

== Statistics ==
Updated to the end of the 2026 season.

Legend
G	Goals	K	Kicks	D	Disposals	T	Tackles
B	Behinds	H	Handballs	M	Marks	H/O	Hit-outs

Season	Team	No.	Games	Totals								Averages (per game)								Votes
Season	Team	No.	Games	G	B	K	H	D	M	T	H/O	G	B	K	H	D	M	T	H/O	Votes
2010	St Kilda	28	7	4	1	24	29	53	23	13	5	0.6	0.1	3.4	4.1	7.6	3.3	1.9	0.7	0
2011	St Kilda	28	2	1	1	8	6	14	9	2	5	0.5	0.5	4.0	3.0	7.0	4.5	1.0	2.5	0
2012	St Kilda	28	12	11	14	82	39	121	56	23	74	0.9	1.2	6.8	3.3	10.1	4.7	1.9	6.2	0
2013	St Kilda	28	18	6	5	123	65	188	67	26	55	0.3	0.3	6.8	3.6	10.4	3.7	1.4	3.1	0
2014	St Kilda	28	19	18	10	129	84	213	121	38	148	0.9	0.5	6.8	4.4	11.2	6.4	2.0	7.8	2
2015	Geelong	1	8	6	2	53	46	99	26	22	124	0.8	0.3	6.6	5.8	12.4	3.3	2.8	15.5	0
2016	Geelong	1	21	17	13	137	111	248	77	41	284	0.8	0.6	6.5	5.3	11.8	3.7	2.0	13.5	2
2017	Geelong	1	13	8	9	78	78	156	54	32	209	0.6	0.7	6.0	6.0	12.0	4.2	2.5	16.1	0
2018	Geelong	1	15	6	3	99	103	202	44	42	423	0.4	0.2	6.6	6.9	13.5	2.9	2.8	28.2	0
2019	Geelong	1	18	7	7	138	111	249	53	46	501	0.4	0.4	7.7	6.2	13.8	2.9	2.6	27.8	0
2020 (Note: The 2020 season was played with 17 home-and-away matches per team (down from 22) and 16-minute quarters with time on (down from 20-minute quarters with time on) due to the impact of the COVID-19 pandemic.)	Geelong	1	11	10	5	72	68	140	32	14	206	0.9	0.5	6.5	6.2	12.7	2.9	1.3	18.7	0
2021	Geelong	1	19	8	5	152	129	281	74	33	391	0.4	0.3	8.0	6.8	14.8	3.9	1.7	20.6	0
2022^{#}	Geelong	1	20	3	2	146	111	257	64	36	418	0.2	0.1	7.3	5.6	12.9	3.2	1.8	20.9	0
2023	Geelong	1	13	0	3	78	77	155	30	32	368	0.0	0.2	6.0	5.9	11.9	2.3	2.5	28.3	0
2024	Geelong	1	14	4	2	83	53	136	34	33	374	0.3	0.1	5.9	3.8	9.7	2.4	2.4	26.7	0
2025	Geelong	1	19	6	5	105	81	186	39	36	473	0.3	0.3	5.5	4.3	9.8	2.1	1.9	24.9	0
2026	Geelong	1	1	0	0	8	9	17	3	3	17	0.0	0.0	8.0	9.0	17.0	3.0	3.0	17.0	0
Career			230	115	87	1515	1200	2715	806	472	4075	0.5	0.4	6.6	5.2	11.8	3.5	2.1	17.7	4

== Honours and achievements ==
Team

- AFL premiership player (Geelong): 2022
- 2× McClelland Trophy (Geelong): 2019, 2022
