= Paddy McCartin =

Australian rules footballer (born 1996)

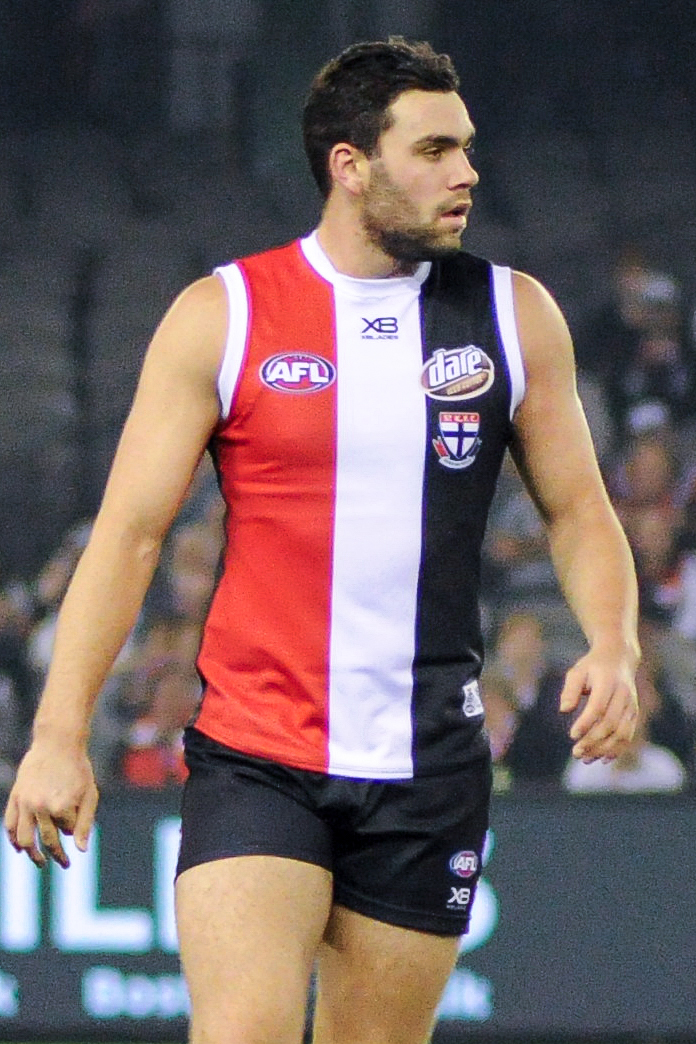
- McCartin playing for St Kilda in April 2018

Personal information
- Full name: Patrick McCartin
- Born: 19 April 1996 (age 30); Hobart, Tasmania
- Original team: Geelong Falcons (TAC Cup) Geelong Grammar
- Draft: No. 1, 2014 National draft
- Height: 195 cm (6 ft 5 in)
- Weight: 100 kg (220 lb)
- Position: Defender

Club information
- Current club: Sydney
- Number: 39

Playing career^{1}
Years	Club	Games (Goals)
2015–2019	St Kilda	35 (34)
2022–2023	Sydney	28 (1)
Total		63 (35)
- ^{1} Playing statistics correct to the end of 2023.

Patrick McCartin (born 19 April 1996) is a former Australian rules footballer who played for the Sydney Swans in the Australian Football League (AFL), having previously played for the St Kilda Football Club from 2015 to 2019. He was drafted as the number one pick in the 2014 AFL draft.

== AFL career ==
=== St Kilda (2015–2019) ===
McCartin finished his education at Geelong Grammar on a football scholarship after attending St Joseph's College, Geelong from years 7 to 10. He played junior football for the Geelong Falcons in the TAC Cup and Victoria Country at the AFL Under 18 Championships.

He made his AFL debut in round 3 of the 2015 AFL season in St Kilda's loss against Collingwood. He was selected as a late replacement for St Kilda captain Nick Riewoldt who pulled out due to a calf injury. McCartin finished the 2015 season with six senior games and three goals to his name. Prior to the 2016 season, he signed a two-year contract extension which would keep him at the club until at least the end of the 2018 season.

McCartin's 2016 season was interrupted by injury, including three separate concussions. The first concussion was suffered in St Kilda's Round 3 win against Collingwood at the MCG, which kept him out of the senior team until his return in Round 9 against Essendon. Subsequent concussions were suffered in Round 11 against Adelaide and Round 15 against Gold Coast and finally a collision with Nick Vlastuin of Richmond in Round 22 led to McCartin sustaining a broken collarbone. Due to these injuries, McCartin was restricted to 11 games in 2016, adding 14 goals to his career total.

Playing for St Kilda's VFL affiliate club Sandringham in June 2017, McCartin suffered a further concussion. This was McCartin's 6th concussion in 4 years. He finished 2017 with only 5 senior AFL games.

McCartin's eighth concussion since 2014 came in a JLT Community Series match against the Western Bulldogs in March 2019. McCartin ultimately did not play a senior game for St Kilda in 2019. He was delisted by St Kilda at the conclusion of the 2019 AFL season to allow him to deal with complications resulting from repeated concussions. St Kilda head of football Simon Lethlean stated that the club would be open to re-adding McCartin to their list after a break in 2020.

=== Sydney (2021–2023) ===
In 2021, McCartin joined the Sydney Swans VFL team. In January 2022, he was signed as a rookie by the Swans as part of the pre-season supplemental selection period. In Round 17 of the 2022 season, McCartin played his 50th AFL game in the Swans' 53-point win against Western Bulldogs at the Sydney Cricket Ground, recording 22 disposals and 9 intercepts. McCartin was part of the Swans' 2022 Grand Final team that lost to Geelong. He had 7 disposals whilst kicking one of Sydney's 8 goals.

In Round 4 of the 2023 AFL season McCartin, whilst fighting for a ground ball, grazed his head on the grass causing him to be concussed. On 31 May 2023, it was announced that McCartin would sit out the rest of the season due to ongoing concussion symptoms.

On 14 August 2023, McCartin announced his retirement from the AFL due to concussion issues.

== Statistics ==
Updated to the end of 2023.

Legend
G	Goals	K	Kicks	D	Disposals	T	Tackles
B	Behinds	H	Handballs	M	Marks

Season	Team	No.	Games	Totals							Averages (per game)						
Season	Team	No.	Games	G	B	K	H	D	M	T	G	B	K	H	D	M	T
2015	St Kilda	32	6	3	5	43	13	56	26	8	0.5	0.8	7.2	2.2	9.3	4.3	1.3
2016	St Kilda	32	11	14	6	56	21	77	48	4	1.3	0.5	5.1	1.9	7.0	4.4	0.4
2017	St Kilda	32	5	5	8	40	18	58	23	5	1.0	1.6	8.0	3.6	11.6	4.6	1.0
2018	St Kilda	32	13	12	17	91	35	126	62	12	0.9	1.3	7.0	2.7	9.7	4.8	0.9
2019	St Kilda	32	0	–	–	–	–	–	–	–	–	–	–	–	–	–	–
2022	Sydney	39	24	1	0	229	65	294	121	23	0.0	0.0	9.5	2.7	12.3	5.0	1.0
2023	Sydney	39	4	0	0	30	9	39	15	3	0.0	0.0	7.5	2.2	9.7	3.7	0.7
Career			63	35	36	489	161	650	280	52	0.5	0.5	7.7	2.5	10.3	4.4	0.8

== Personal life ==
His younger brother, Tom, was drafted by the Sydney Swans at pick number 33 in the 2017 AFL draft. The two brothers first played against each other in Round 12 2018 at Docklands Stadium.

At age eight, McCartin was diagnosed with type 1 diabetes.
