= Tom McCartin =

Australian rules footballer

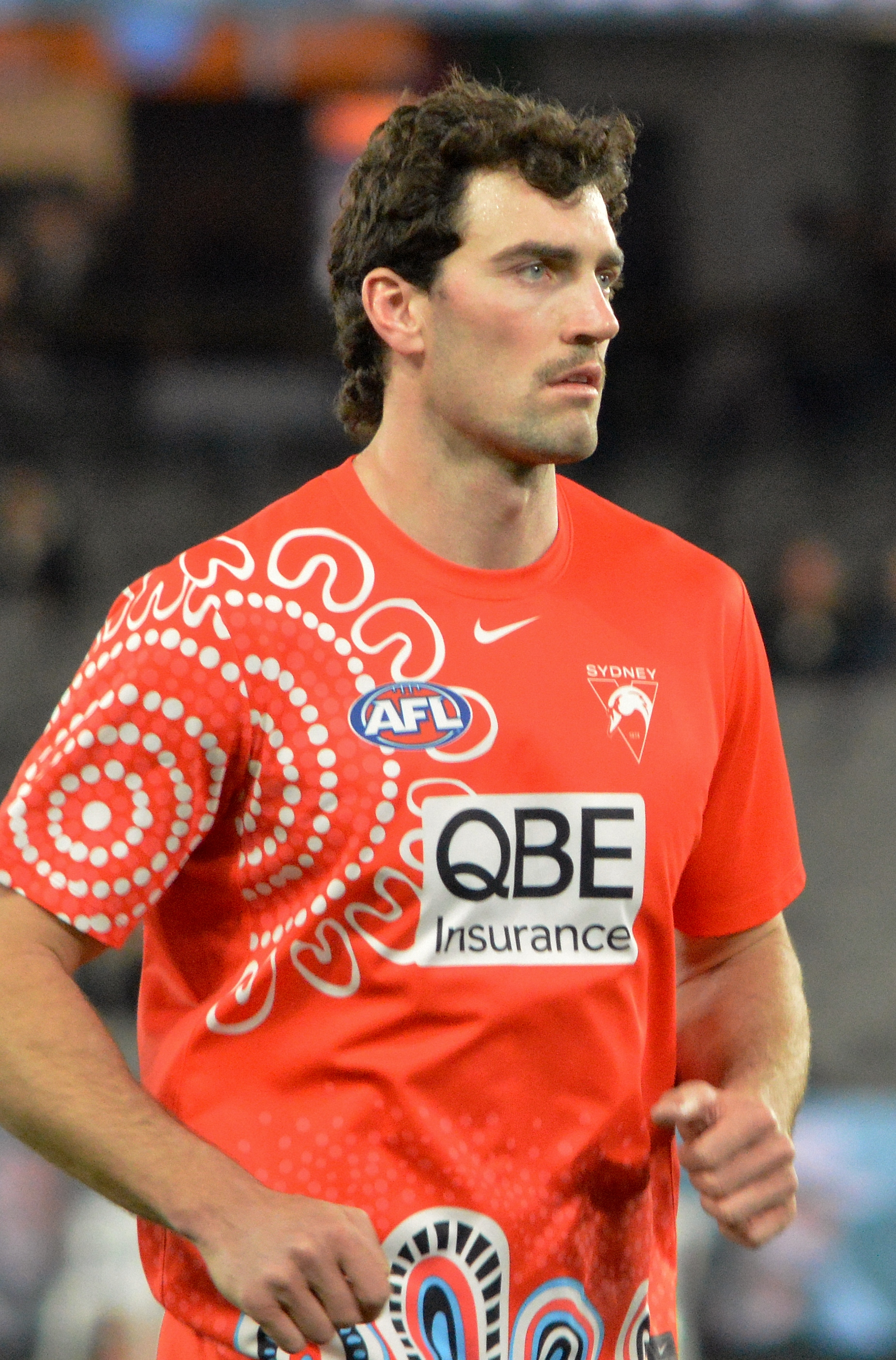
- McCartin in August 2026

Personal information
- Full name: Tom McCartin
- Nickname: Tommy
- Born: 30 December 1999 (age 26)
- Original team: Geelong Falcons (TAC Cup)
- Draft: No. 33, 2017 national draft
- Debut: Round 8, 2018, Sydney vs. Hawthorn, at MCG
- Height: 194 cm (6 ft 4 in)
- Weight: 95 kg (209 lb)
- Position: Key Defender

Club information
- Current club: Sydney
- Number: 30

Playing career^{1}
Years	Club	Games (Goals)
2018–	Sydney	170 (31)
- ^{1} Playing statistics correct to the end of round 22, 2026.

Tom McCartin (born 30 December 1999) is a professional Australian rules footballer playing for the Sydney Swans in the Australian Football League (AFL). He is a key defender. He made his debut in round 8 of the 2018 season against Hawthorn at the Melbourne Cricket Ground (MCG).

McCartin originally played in the TAC Cup for the Geelong Falcons, but has also played three games in the AFL Under 18 Championships for Vic Country. He missed the whole of the 2016 season due to viral arthritis. At the AFL Draft Combine, he recorded 88 centimetres (35 in) in the running vertical leap and level 21.5 in the yo-yo test. McCartin was drafted with pick 33 in the 2017 draft while completing Year 11 at St Joseph's College, Geelong, but decided not to complete Year 12. He was the youngest player on an AFL list in round 1, 2018 at 18 years and 82 days. Sydney coach John Longmire praised McCartin for his work rate during his first preseason.

Tom is the brother of former St Kilda and Sydney player Paddy McCartin. The brothers played against each other for the first time in round 12, 2018 at Docklands Stadium. Sydney won by 71 points and both brothers kicked a goal. In September 2018, McCartin extended his contract by two years, tying him to Sydney until 2021. He played 15 games in his debut season as a key-position forward after Sam Reid was kept out with injuries. Football manager Tom Harley commented, "For an 18-year-old to hold down a key-position post for more than half the season in his debut year is an unbelievable achievement."

== Statistics ==
Updated to the end of round 22, 2026.

Legend
G	Goals	K	Kicks	D	Disposals	T	Tackles
B	Behinds	H	Handballs	M	Marks

Season	Team	No.	Games	Totals							Averages (per game)							Votes
Season	Team	No.	Games	G	B	K	H	D	M	T	G	B	K	H	D	M	T	Votes
2018	Sydney	30	15	8	6	69	65	134	50	32	0.5	0.4	4.6	4.3	8.9	3.3	2.1	0
2019	Sydney	30	19	11	10	127	64	191	79	28	0.6	0.5	6.7	3.4	10.1	4.2	1.5	0
2020 (Note: The 2020 season was played with 17 home-and-away matches per team (down from 22) and 16-minute quarters with time on (down from 20-minute quarters with time on) due to the impact of the COVID-19 pandemic.)	Sydney	30	14	9	2	70	49	119	51	12	0.6	0.1	5.0	3.5	8.5	3.6	0.9	0
2021	Sydney	30	22	0	0	196	101	297	111	23	0.0	0.0	8.9	4.6	13.5	5.0	1.0	0
2022	Sydney	30	25	0	0	137	107	244	96	38	0.0	0.0	5.5	4.3	9.8	3.8	1.5	2
2023	Sydney	30	15	0	0	89	100	189	60	21	0.0	0.0	5.9	6.7	12.6	4.0	1.4	0
2024	Sydney	30	22	0	0	167	83	250	106	12	0.0	0.0	7.6	3.8	11.4	4.8	0.5	0
2025	Sydney	30	20	3	2	182	84	266	127	14	0.2	0.1	9.1	4.2	13.3	6.4	0.7	0
2026	Sydney	30	18	0	0	182	165	347	129	25	0.0	0.0	10.1	9.2	19.3	7.2	1.4	0
Career			170	31	20	1219	818	2037	809	205	0.2	0.1	7.2	4.8	12.0	4.8	1.2	2
