= State of Origin for Bushfire Relief Match =

2020 AFL State of Origin for Bushfire Relief

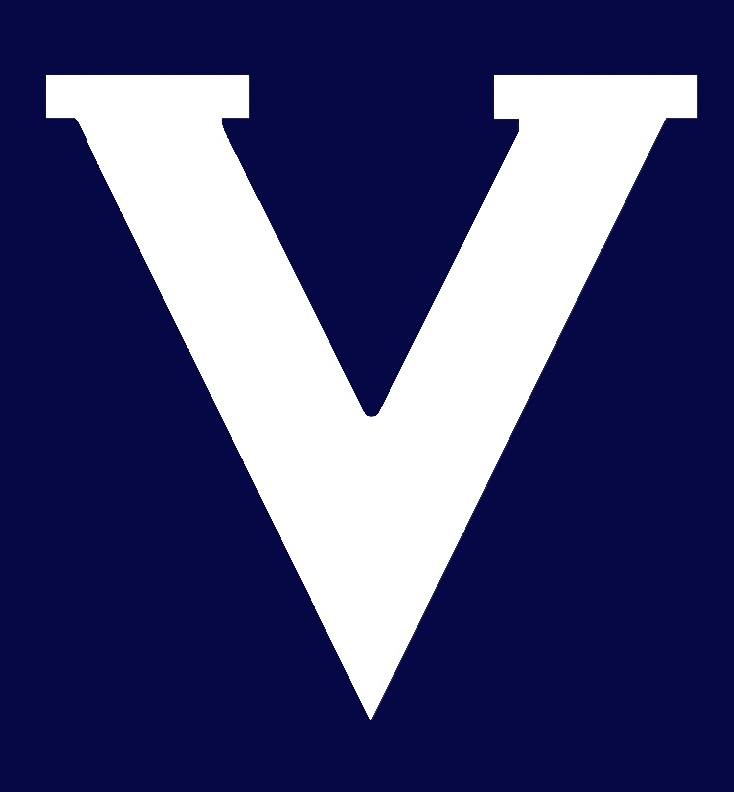

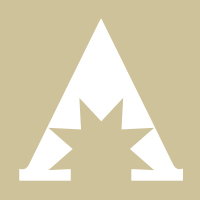
Victoria	All-Stars
24.10 (154)	15.18 (108)
	1	2	3	4
VIC	4.1 (25)	10.2 (62)	15.7 (97)	24.10 (154)
AS	4.7 (31)	9.14 (68)	15.16 (106)	15.18 (108)
- Date: 28 February 2020
- Stadium: Marvel Stadium
- Attendance: 51,052
- Umpires: Fisher, Stephens, Nicholls, Williamson

Broadcast in Australia
- Network: Seven Network, Fox Footy
- Commentators: Eddie McGuire, Bruce McAvaney, Anthony Hudson and Brian Taylor

The State of Origin for Bushfire Relief Match was a one-off all-star game between two representative sides organised by the Australian Football League (AFL) to raise funds for recovery efforts following the 2019–20 Australian bushfire season.

The match was played on 28 February 2020 at Marvel Stadium in Melbourne, Australia, between Victoria (the "Big V") and the "All-Stars", with a crowd of 51,052 in attendance. Victoria won the match by 46 points.

== History ==
On 9 January, the AFL announced a one-off benefit match would be played on 28 February 2020, as a fundraiser for the relief effort for the 2019–20 Australian bushfire season. The league donated $2.5 million to disaster relief funds in association with the match. Selection for the two teams was under state of origin rules – with players of Victorian origin eligible for Victoria, and all other players eligible for the All-Stars – and it was the first interstate representative match featuring AFL-listed players since the AFL Hall of Fame Tribute Match held in 2008.

== Teams ==
On 18 February the AFL announced 27-player teams for each of the Victoria and All-Stars side. All AFL teams had at least one player selected in one of the sides. The match was played with an extended interchange bench of nine players instead of four.

Three late changes were made to the side due to injuries between the initial team announcement and the game itself, with Eddie Betts replacing Dayne Zorko in the All-Stars side and Travis Boak and Andrew Gaff replacing Robbie Gray and Ben Cunnington for Victoria.

Damien Hardwick and John Longmire were the coaches of Victoria and the All-Stars, respectively, and were also primarily responsible for selecting players for their sides.

Richmond captain Trent Cotchin and Fremantle captain Nat Fyfe were named to captain Victoria and the All-Stars, respectively.

=== Victoria ===
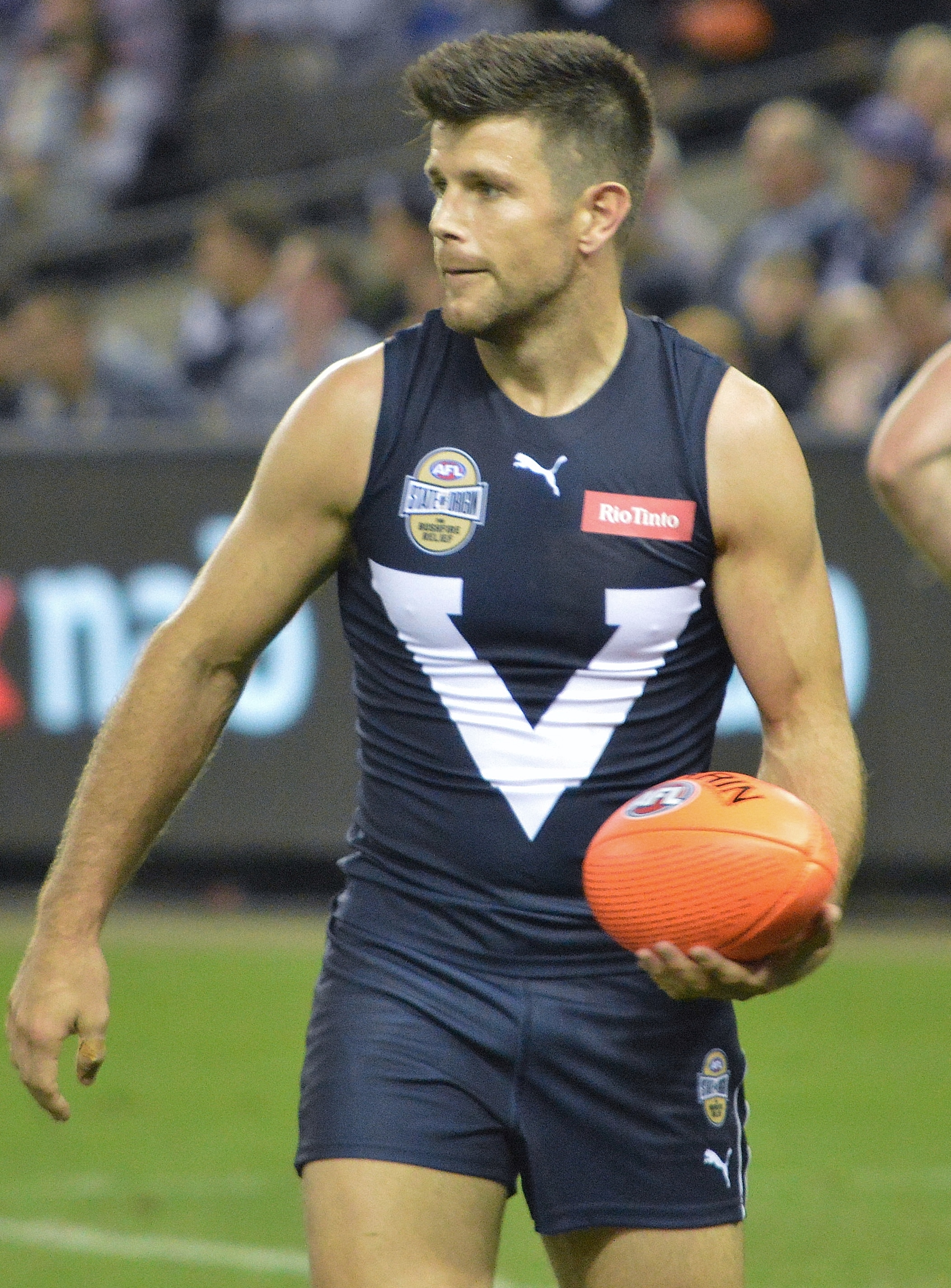
Victoria captain Trent Cotchin

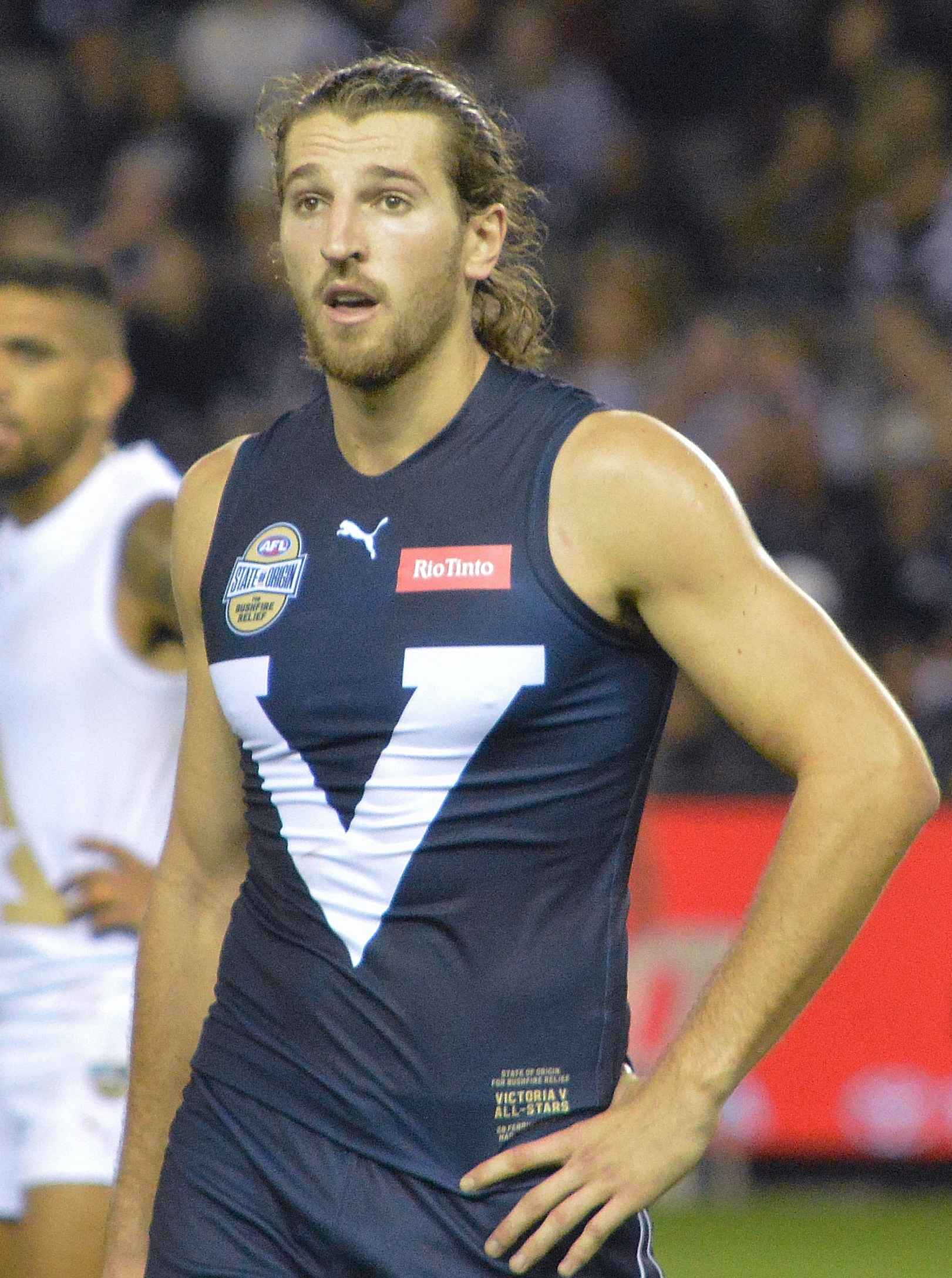
Marcus Bontempelli

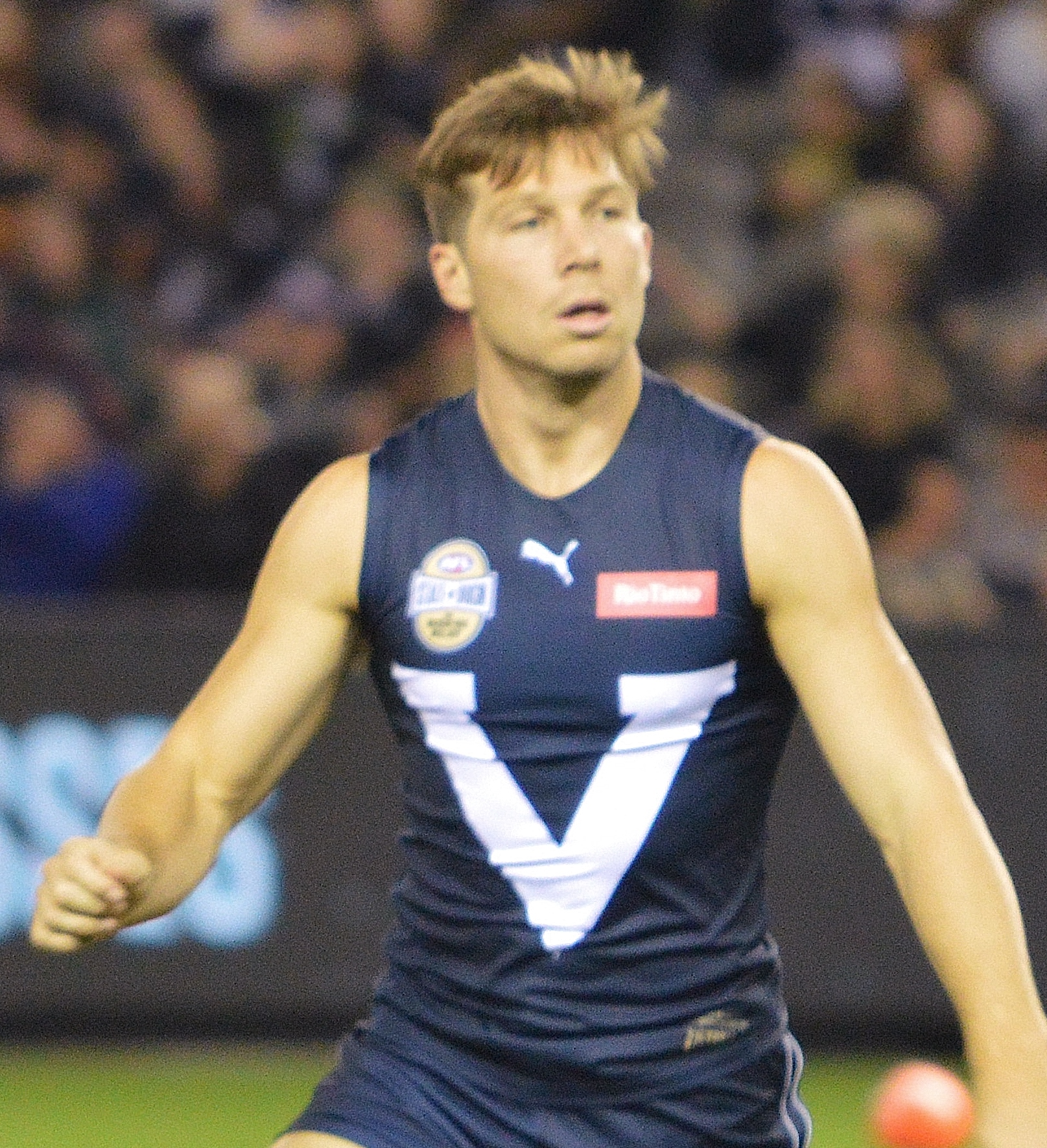
Toby Greene

No.	Player's Name	AFL club	State/Territory	Nation
1	Jade Gresham	St Kilda	Victoria	Australia
2	Shaun Higgins	North Melbourne	Victoria	Australia
3	Andrew Gaff	West Coast	Victoria	Australia
4	Dustin Martin	Richmond	Victoria	Australia
5	Toby Greene	Greater Western Sydney	Victoria	Australia
6	Lachie Whitfield	Greater Western Sydney	Victoria	Australia
7	Marcus Bontempelli	Western Bulldogs	Victoria	Australia
8	Travis Boak	Port Adelaide	Victoria	Australia
9	Trent Cotchin (c)	Richmond	Victoria	Australia
10	Scott Pendlebury	Collingwood	Victoria	Australia
11	Jack Macrae	Western Bulldogs	Victoria	Australia
12	Tom Papley	Sydney	Victoria	Australia
13	Stefan Martin	Brisbane Lions	Victoria	Australia
14	Bachar Houli	Richmond	Victoria	Australia
18	Jeremy Cameron	Greater Western Sydney	Victoria	Australia
19	Tom Lynch	Richmond	Victoria	Australia
20	Nick Haynes	Greater Western Sydney	Victoria	Australia
21	James Sicily	Hawthorn	Victoria	Australia
22	Todd Goldstein	North Melbourne	Victoria	Australia
23	Josh Kelly	Greater Western Sydney	Victoria	Australia
24	Steele Sidebottom	Collingwood	Victoria	Australia
30	Darcy Moore	Collingwood	Victoria	Australia
31	Rory Sloane	Adelaide	Victoria	Australia
35	Patrick Dangerfield	Geelong	Victoria	Australia
42	Adam Saad	Essendon	Victoria	Australia
44	Jake Lloyd	Sydney	Victoria	Australia
46	Mark Blicavs	Geelong	Victoria	Australia
Source: Fox Sports

=== All-Stars ===
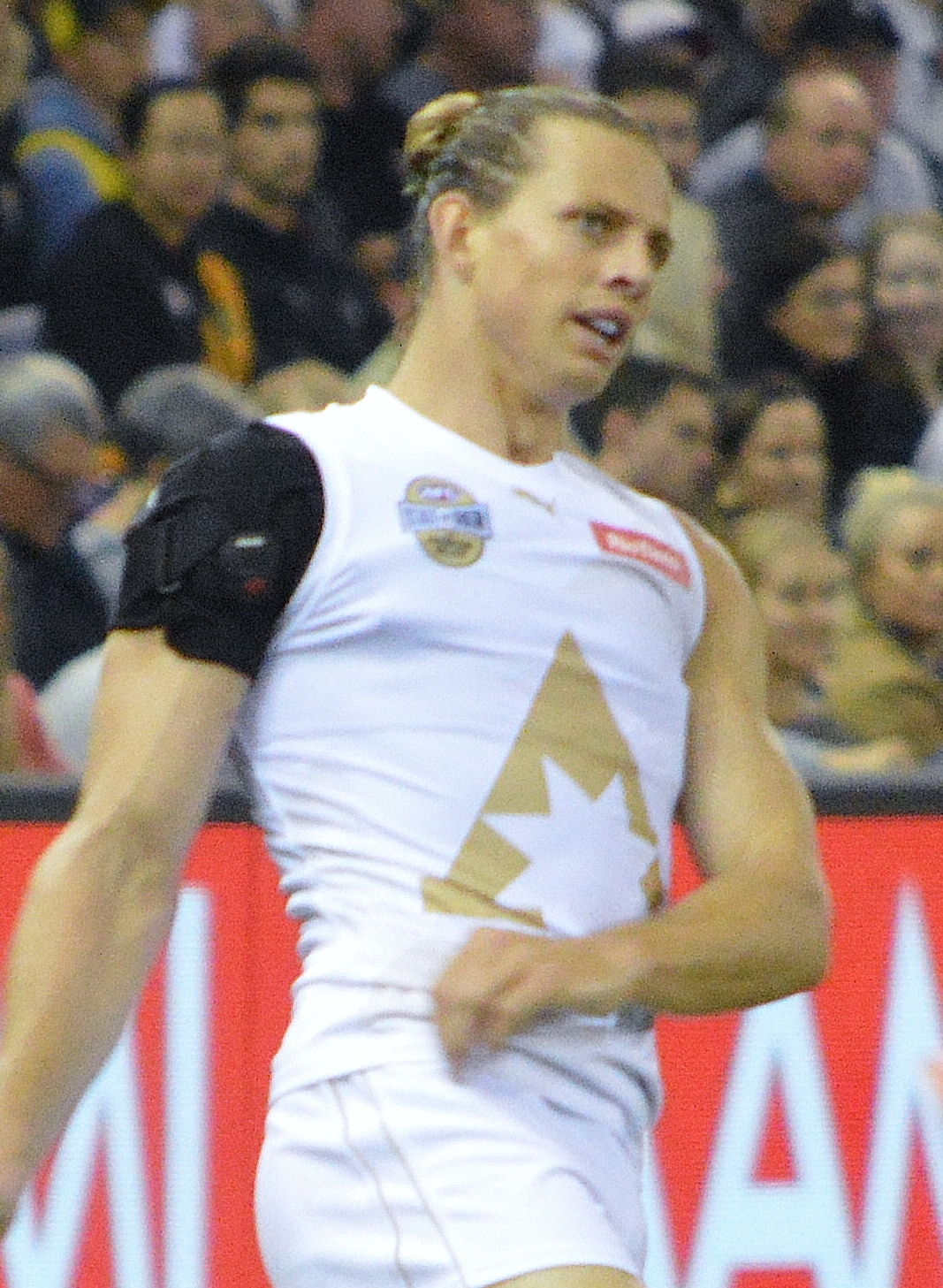
All-Stars captain Nat Fyfe

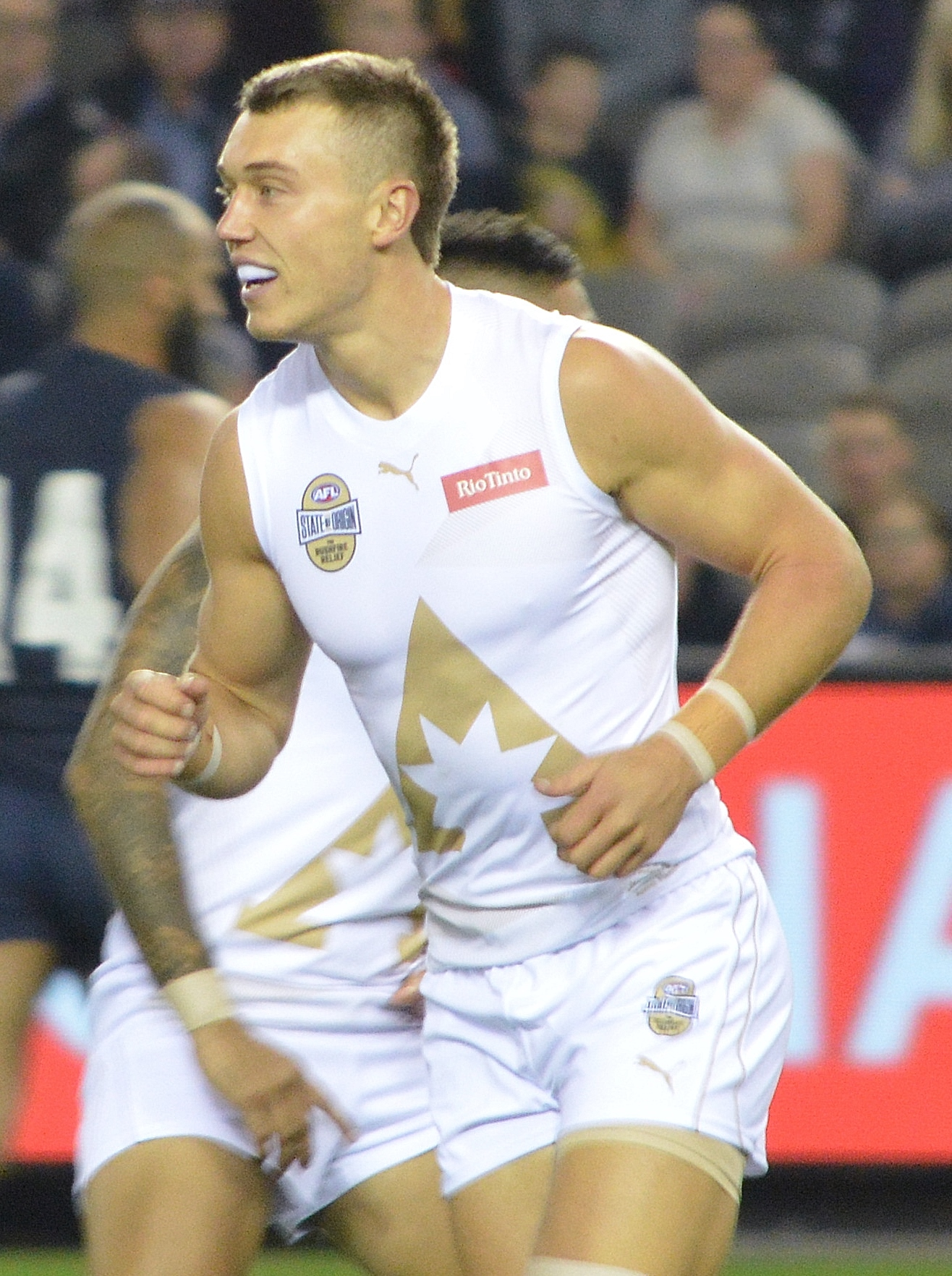
Patrick Cripps

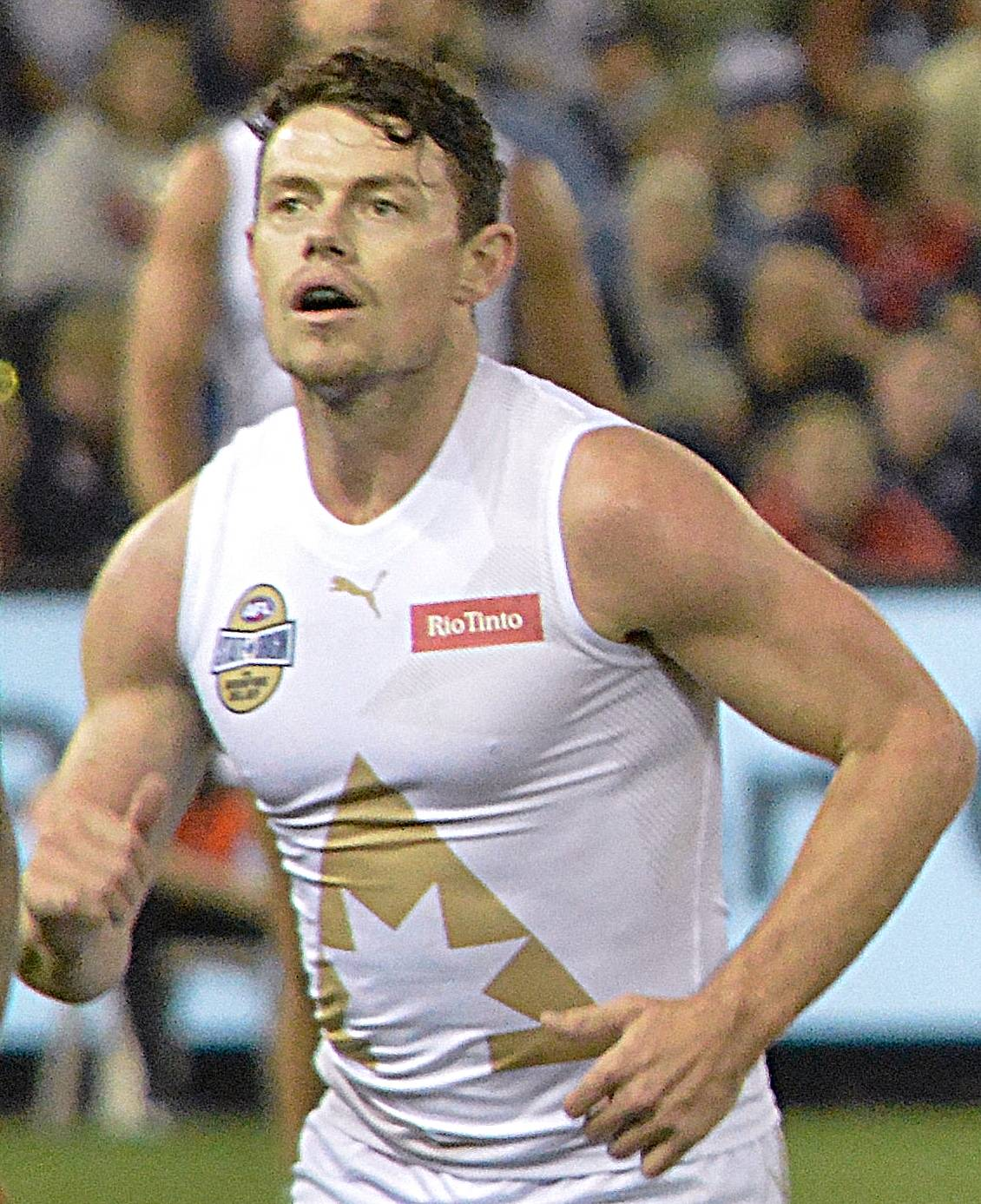
Lachie Neale

No.	Player's Name	AFL club	State/Territory	Nation
1	Michael Walters	Fremantle	Western Australia	Australia
2	Zach Tuohy	Geelong	Laois	Ireland
3	Stephen Coniglio	Greater Western Sydney	Western Australia	Australia
4	Brodie Grundy	Collingwood	South Australia	Australia
5	Brad Sheppard	West Coast	Western Australia	Australia
6	Elliot Yeo	West Coast	Western Australia	Australia
7	Nat Fyfe (c)	Fremantle	Western Australia	Australia
8	Jack Riewoldt	Richmond	Tasmania	Australia
9	Patrick Cripps	Carlton	Western Australia	Australia
10	Shane Edwards	Richmond	South Australia	Australia
12	Callum Mills	Sydney	New South Wales	Australia
13	Taylor Walker	Adelaide	New South Wales	Australia
14	Lachie Weller	Gold Coast	Tasmania	Australia
16	Isaac Smith	Hawthorn	New South Wales	Australia
17	Lachie Neale	Brisbane Lions	South Australia	Australia
18	Scott Lycett	Port Adelaide	South Australia	Australia
19	Eddie Betts	Carlton	South Australia	Australia
22	Luke Breust	Hawthorn	New South Wales	Australia
23	Charlie Cameron	Brisbane Lions	Queensland	Australia
26	Tom Hawkins	Geelong	New South Wales	Australia
29	Rory Laird	Adelaide	South Australia	Australia
31	Harris Andrews	Brisbane Lions	Queensland	Australia
32	Bradley Hill	St Kilda	Western Australia	Australia
33	Brodie Smith	Adelaide	South Australia	Australia
38	Jeremy Howe	Collingwood	Tasmania	Australia
39	Neville Jetta	Melbourne	Western Australia	Australia
40	Jason Johannisen	Western Bulldogs	Gauteng	South Africa
Source: Fox Sports

== Best-on-ground award ==
The best-on-ground medal was awarded to Dustin Martin, who kicked two goals and had 23 disposals for Victoria.

== Scorecard ==
State of Origin for Bushfire Relief Match
Friday, 28 February 2020 7:50 pm	Victoria	def.	All-Stars	Marvel Stadium (crowd: 51,052)	Report
4.1 (25); 10.2 (62); 15.7 (97); 24.10 (154)	Q1; Q2; Q3; Final	4.7 (31); 9.14 (68); 15.16 (106); 15.18 (108)	Umpires: Fisher, Stephens, Nicholls, Williamson; Best on Ground Medal: Dustin Martin (Victoria)
Papley 5 Kelly, Greene 4 Martin, Gaff, Bontempelli, Gresham 2 Dangerfield, J Cameron, Lynch 1	Goals	C Cameron 3 Coniglio, Breust, Riewoldt, Smith 2 Neale, Weller, Walters, Hill 1
Kelly, Martin, Greene, Papley, Pendlebury, Haynes, Cotchin, Dangerfield	Best	Coniglio, C Cameron, Mills, Cripps, Neale, Johannisen

== See also ==
- 2020 AFL season
- AFL Hall of Fame Tribute Match
