= 2025 AFL Grand Final =

Australian rules football match

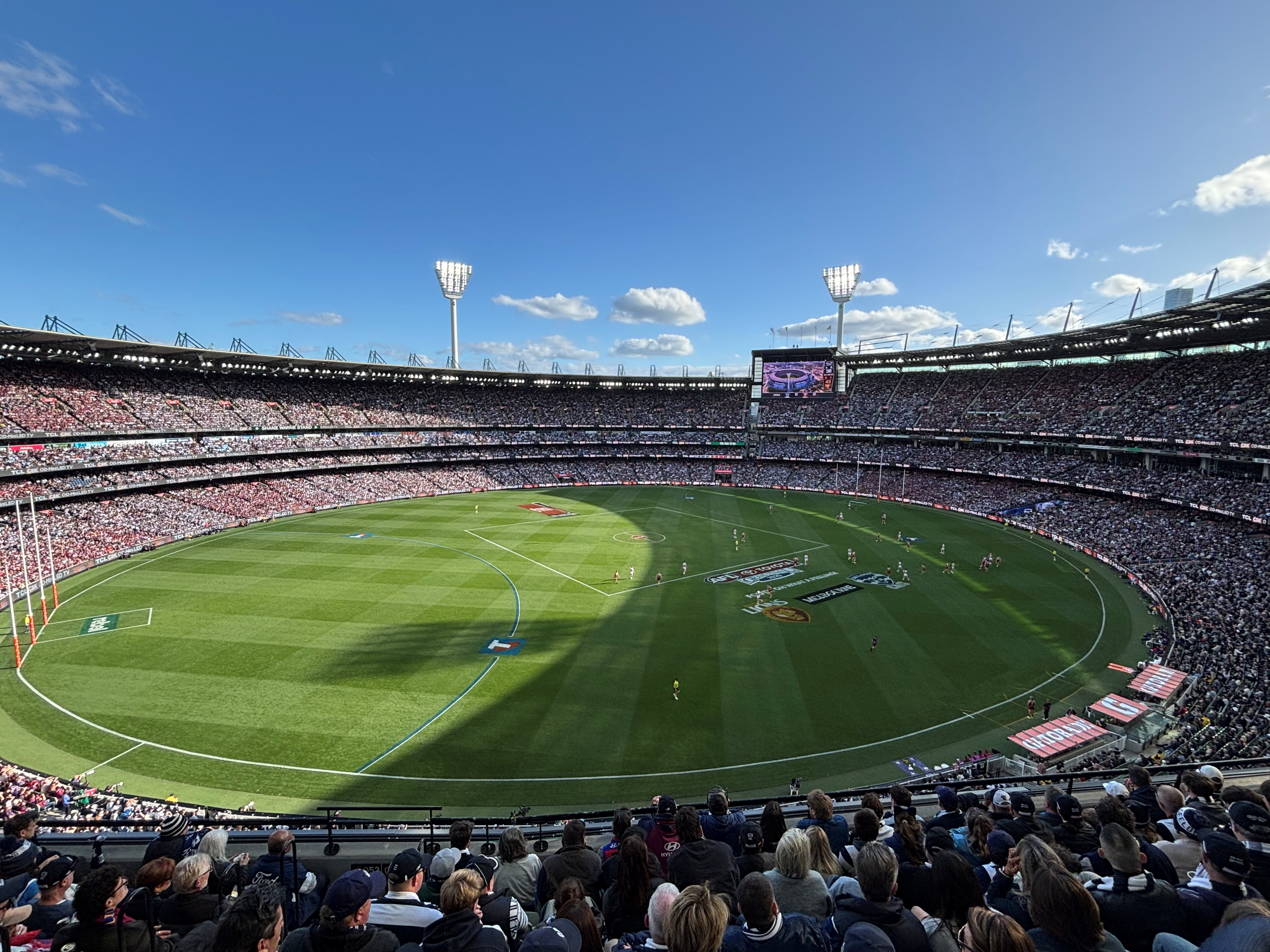
- Scenes inside the MCG during the third quarter of the match

Geelong	Brisbane Lions
11.9 (75)	18.14 (122)
	1	2	3	4
Geelong	2.3 (15)	5.6 (36)	6.8 (44)	11.9 (75)
Brisbane	1.6 (12)	5.6 (36)	9.9 (63)	18.14 (122)
- Date: 27 September 2025, 2:30 pm
- Stadium: Melbourne Cricket Ground, Melbourne, Victoria, Australia
- Attendance: 100,022
- Favourite: Geelong
- Umpires: Andrew Stephens, Hayden Meyer, Simon Meredith, Jacob Mollison
- Coin toss won by: Brisbane Lions
- Kicked toward: City End

Ceremonies
- Pre-match entertainment: Snoop Dogg, Baker Boy, Tash Sultana, Jessica Mauboy and Mike Brady
- National anthem: Vera Blue

Accolades
- Norm Smith Medallist: Will Ashcroft
- Jock McHale Medallist: Chris Fagan
- Ron Barassi Medallist: Lachie Neale, Harris Andrews

Broadcast in Australia
- Network: Seven Network

The 2025 AFL Grand Final was an Australian rules football match contested between the Geelong Football Club and the Brisbane Lions at the Melbourne Cricket Ground on Saturday, 27 September 2025. It was the 130th annual grand final of the Australian Football League (AFL), staged to determine the premiers of the 2025 AFL season. The Brisbane Lions won by a margin of 47 points. It was the club's fifth premiership, and the second in a sequence of three consecutive premierships won from 2024 to 2026.

== Background ==
Geelong entered the 2025 season after a preliminary final loss to Brisbane in 2024. They finished second on the ladder with a 17–6 record, defeating Brisbane in the second qualifying final at the Melbourne Cricket Ground, 16.16 (112) to 11.8 (74), to qualify for the second preliminary final. There they faced Hawthorn, overcoming a strong first quarter from the Hawks before pulling away in the later stages to advance to the grand final with a score of 17.13 (115) to Hawthorn 13.7 (85). It was Geelong's first grand final since 2022, when they defeated Sydney by 81 points to claim the premiership.

Brisbane entered 2025 as the reigning premiers, having defeated Sydney in the 2024 Grand Final. The Lions finished third on the ladder with a 16–6–1 record. After their qualifying final loss to Geelong, they hosted Gold Coast in a QClash semi-final, dominating in a 14.16 (100) to 6.11 (47) victory. They then faced Collingwood in a preliminary final at the MCG; despite a second-quarter surge from the Magpies, the Lions eventually won 15.10 (100) to 11.5 (71) to qualify for their third consecutive grand final.

Geelong was aiming for its 11th VFL/AFL premiership and second in four years, while Brisbane was aiming for its fifth and the chance to win consecutive premierships for the first time since winning three in a row in 2001–2002–2003. The sides had never previously met in a grand final.

The two teams met three times prior to the decider in 2025. Brisbane won both home-and-away encounters, winning 10.10 (70) to 9.7 (61) in round 3 at the Gabba and 14.8 (92) to 6.15 (51) in round 15 at GMHBA Stadium, before Geelong won the qualifying final. Geelong was a warm favourite with bookmakers with odds of $1.55 compared to Brisbane's $2.47 on the Thursday before the game.

== Entertainment ==
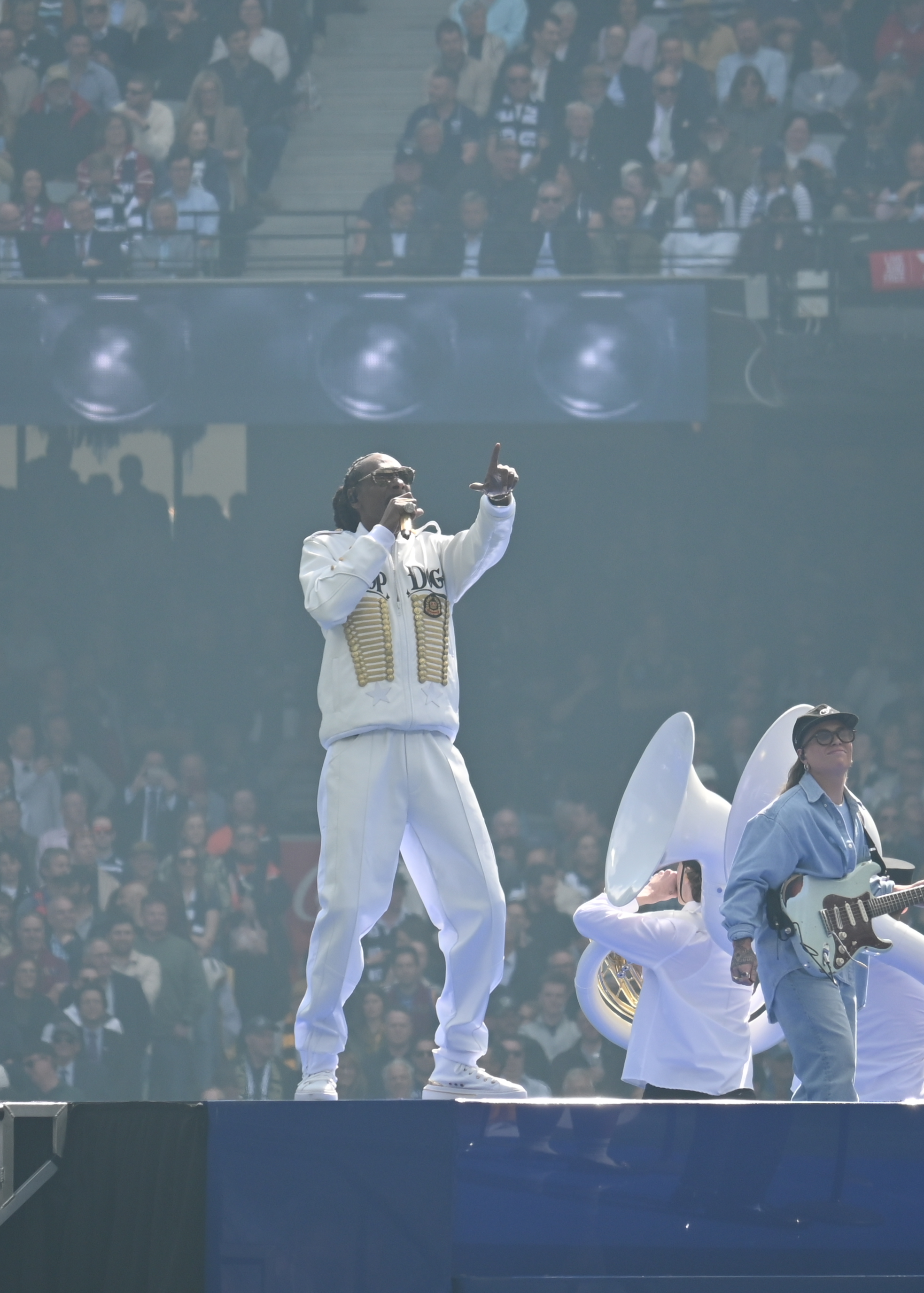
Snoop Dogg performing during the prematch entertainment

Scheduled on-field events
Time	Event
9:35 am	AFL Grand Final curtain-raiser: AFL Futures Match
12:38 pm	AFL Grand Final Sprint heats
1:30 pm	AFL Grand Final motorcade
1:33 pm	Mike Brady performs "Up There Cazaly"
1:40 pm	Snoop Dogg performs
2:13 pm	Teams enter the ground
2:24 pm	Delivery of the premiership cup by Jack Riewoldt
2:25 pm	Welcome to Country—Wurundjeri Elder Uncle Colin Hunter Jr.
2:26 pm	The Australian National Anthem performed by Vera Blue
2:30 pm	Game starts
Half-time	AFL Grand Final Sprint final
Post-game	Post-game presentation

All times are Australian Eastern Standard Time (GMT +10)

Snoop Dogg headlined the entertainment, reportedly for a A$2 million fee. The choice caused some controversy due to offensive and homophobic lyrics and posts from Snoop Dogg's past, criticism which was amplified by booking coming shortly after Adelaide Crows forward Izak Rankine had been suspended for using a homophobic slur on field. Australian artists, including Tash Sultana and Baker Boy, were later added to the pre-game show.

During the match, the clubs were permitted to play music over the public address system as part of the celebrations after each goal. It had been an increasing trend over recent years for clubs across the league to incorporate music into their goal celebrations at home games, and 2025 was the first time this had been permitted in the grand final.

== Match summary ==
The match was played in fine weather, with a maximum temperature of 19°C. Brisbane won the coin toss and kicked to the city end in the first quarter.

=== First quarter ===
The match began slowly, and in the first seven minutes of play there were fifteen stoppages and one rushed behind. Over the following ten minutes Brisbane had several scoring chances but managed only three behinds – including two difficult shots missed by Zac Bailey – while Geelong had the better of territory, and eventually Geelong wingman Ollie Dempsey kicked the opening goal in the 16th minute from the goal square. Brisbane's Kai Lohmann, head bandaged after having come off under the blood rule in the 9th minute after taking an accidental knee to the head, kicked Brisbane's first goal from a set shot in the 21st minute shortly after his return. A running coast-to-coast goal in the 24th minute by Oisín Mullin was the last goal of the quarter.

At quarter time Geelong 2.3 (15) led Brisbane 1.6 (12) by three points. The quarter was high on stoppages, with Brisbane leading clearances slightly 12–8. Geelong managed to quell Brisbane's typical short uncontested marking game by forcing Brisbane wide to the wings, and both teams' tall defenses were keeping the opposing marking forwards quiet. Brisbane midfielder-forward Zac Bailey scored four behinds for the quarter, and Geelong midfielder Max Holmes had the most disposals of any player with 11.

=== Second quarter ===
Geelong's Jack Bowes kicked the first goal of the second quarter in the second minute from a free kick, and a behind to Tyson Stengle two minutes later extended Geelong's lead to what was ultimately its game-high ten points. Brisbane then kicked the next three goals: Logan Morris in the 6th minute after winning a contested mark at full forward; Charlie Cameron with a tight crumbing snap shot from the boundary line in the 7th minute, and Hugh McCluggage from a set shot in the forward pocket in the 14th minute. A 55-metre goal from a free kick by Geelong key forward Shannon Neale reduced the margin to one point, before Brisbane's Levi Ashcroft kicked a long 50-metre goal from a set shot after the subsequent centre bounce. A set shot goal from Brad Close levelled the scores in the 26th minute, and the two sides entered half time level at 5.6 (36) each.

To this point of the game, key match statistics were extremely balanced: the sides were equal on disposals (165–165), kicks (103–103) and handballs (62–62), and almost equal on clearances (Brisbane leading 20–19) and inside-50s (Geelong leading 27–26). The free kick count favoured Geelong (17–4). Brisbane was able to get its uncontested marking and ball movement through the centre square working in the second quarter, and was felt to have had the better of general play. Brisbane midfielder Will Ashcroft led all players for disposals to half-time, with 17 including four clearances.

Geelong forward Jeremy Cameron fractured his arm after getting it caught in an awkward collision with captain Patrick Dangerfield in the 22nd minute of the quarter.

=== Third quarter ===
Going into the second half, Brisbane coach Chris Fagan substituted Lachie Neale into the game, who had spent the preceding week under an injury cloud. Jeremy Cameron returned to the field, his fractured arm protected with a forearm guard, and kicked his first score, a behind, in the third minute. Geelong had the better of general play through the first part of the quarter, but Brisbane kicked the first goal in the 7th minute, Zac Bailey getting on the end of a rebound chain after a Geelong turnover in the centre of the ground.

In a key moment in the 12th minute, Jeremy Cameron chased down Brisbane's Jaspa Fletcher in a long run down the wing, catching him with a strong one-armed tackle with his uninjured arm; the effort prevented an uncontested Brisbane inside-50, effected a turnover which finished with a 50-metre set shot goal to Max Holmes to give Geelong the lead, but saw Cameron leave the field for the rest of the quarter for more treatment on his injured arm. Brisbane also suffered a key injury in the 20th minute, with Brandon Starcevich leaving the ground with concussion in the 20th minute after a head knock in a contested marking contest; he did not return to the game.

With 23 minutes elapsed, the margin was still only one point in favour of Brisbane. Then over the next ten minutes, Brisbane kicked three quick goals: Cameron scoring his second and third goals in the 24th and 28th minutes, and Neale kicking a goal on the run from outside the 50-metre arc in the 30th minute, opening a game high 19-point lead.

Brisbane led by that margin at three quarter time, Brisbane 9.9 (63) leading Geelong 6.8 (44). Brisbane began to take control of clearances in the third quarter, with Will Ashcroft and Hugh McCluggage both very influential in that aspect of the game. During the break, Geelong substituted struggling ruckman Rhys Stanley out of the game for small forward Jack Martin, while Jeremy Cameron returned with even heavier strapping on his fractured arm.

=== Final quarter ===
Brisbane opened the final quarter quickly and strongly, winning a holding the ball free kick at the opening bounce which ended with a set shot to Charlie Cameron, who kicked his fourth goal. Brisbane missed two more shots at goal in the next five minutes, and a coast-to-coast rebound ended with a mark, fifty-metre penalty and goal from the goal-line to Geelong's Mark Blicavs, narrowing the margin to 21 points in the 6th minute.

Brisbane answered immediately with three goals in the next five minutes. The first, in the eighth minute, was kicked by Cam Rayner, after skill errors by Geelong defenders Zach Guthrie and Connor O'Sullivan resulted in a turnover in their defensive goal square. Goals followed by Will Ashcroft (10th minute) and Hugh McCluggage (12th minute), extending the margin to 39 points halfway through the quarter. Further Brisbane goals followed to Bailey (19th minute), Lohmann (21st minute), Bailey again (25th minute) and McCluggage again (26th minute). By this stage, since Charlie Cameron's goals late in the third quarter goal, Brisbane had added 11.4 (70) to Geelong's 1.1 (7) in just over a quarter of playing time, turning what had been a one-point lead in a low-scoring game into a dominant 64-point advantage; Brisbane had a 21–7 advantage in inside-50s over that time, a significant increase in marks inside forward 50, and a dominance in contested possessions.

Geelong kicked four late goals – three to Ollie Dempsey (29th minute, 32nd minute and 34th minute) and one to Shaun Mannagh (35th minute) – broken up by McCluggage's fourth goal (30th minute) to bring the final margin down to 47 points. Kicking nine goals to five in the final quarter, Brisbane 18.14 (122) defeated Geelong 11.9 (75).

=== Overall ===
Brisbane dominated all key statistical measures in the second half; and for the five statistics which were practically equal at half time, Brisbane finished with comfortable leads in disposals (361–319), kicks (230–199), handballs (131–120), clearances (52–37) and inside 50s (66–51). Brisbane also led tackles 76–51, and hitouts 64–46. The final free kick count was 22–17 in Geelong's favour.

=== Norm Smith Medal ===
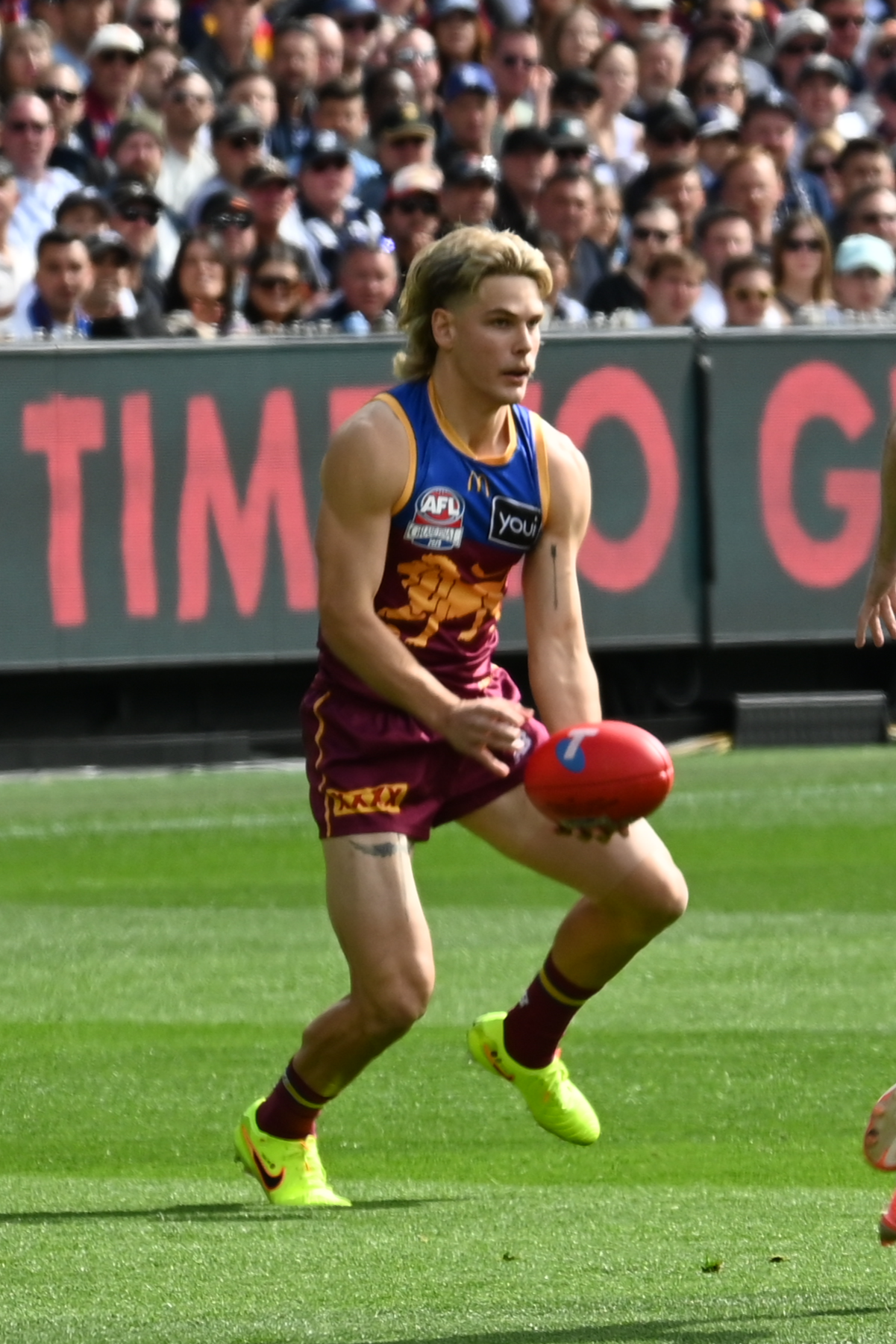
Will Ashcroft won the Norm Smith Medal for the second time.

The Norm Smith Medal was won by Brisbane midfielder Will Ashcroft for the second consecutive year, making him the youngest dual Norm Smith Medallist in the award's history. Ashcroft had 32 disposals, 10 clearances, 10 score involvements and a final-quarter goal, winning the medal with a score of 13 out of 15 possible votes.

All other votes also went to Brisbane players. Full-back Harris Andrews was second with six votes; he helped Brisbane control territory with 18 disposals from 11 intercepts and kept Geelong forward Shannon Neale to only one goal. Midfielder-forward Zac Bailey was third with five votes; finishing with an inaccurate 3.6, he was nevertheless one of the few constant forward-line threats for either team up until three-quarter time. The remaining votes went to rebounding defenders Jaspa Fletcher (3 votes, 29 disposals, 6 intercepts) and Dayne Zorko (2 votes, 28 disposals, 716 metres gained), and midfielder Hugh McCluggage (1 vote, 26 disposals and 4 goals despite a heavy tag).

2025 Norm Smith Medal Voting Panel
Voting Panellist	3 Votes	2 Votes	1 Vote
Andrew McLeod (Chair, Former winner)	Will Ashcroft (Brisbane)	Zac Bailey (Brisbane)	Harris Andrews (Brisbane)
Luke Hodge (Channel 7)	Jaspa Fletcher (Brisbane)	Will Ashcroft (Brisbane)	Hugh McCluggage (Brisbane)
Kate McCarthy (Triple M)	Harris Andrews (Brisbane)	Will Ashcroft (Brisbane)	Zac Bailey (Brisbane)
Jack Riewoldt (Fox Footy)	Will Ashcroft (Brisbane)	Harris Andrews (Brisbane)	Zac Bailey (Brisbane)
Adam Simpson (SEN)	Will Ashcroft (Brisbane)	Dayne Zorko (Brisbane)	Zac Bailey (Brisbane)

Leaderboard
Player	Team	Votes	Total
Will Ashcroft	Brisbane	3, 2, 2, 3, 3	13
Harris Andrews	Brisbane	3, 2, 1	6
Zac Bailey	Brisbane	2, 1, 1, 1	5
Jaspa Fletcher	Brisbane	3	3
Dayne Zorko	Brisbane	2	2
Hugh McCluggage	Brisbane	1	1

Other Brisbane players ranked among the best included midfielder Lachie Neale (17 disposals and a goal after being substituted into the game at half-time); small forward Charlie Cameron (4 goals); defender Darcy Gardiner (kept Coleman Medallist Jeremy Cameron to 0.2); and rebounding defender Callum Ah Chee (17 disposals, 6 intercepts).

Geelong's best players were wingman Ollie Dempsey (19 disposals, 4 goals); midfielders Max Holmes (33 disposals, 9 inside-50s and 907 metres gained), Tom Atkins (20 disposals, 10 clearances), and Bailey Smith (29 disposals, 4 clearances); and defender Lawson Humphries (23 disposals, 7 marks, and nullified Charlie Cameron in the first half). However, few Geelong players were able to have any influence in the decisive second half. Captain Patrick Dangerfield (tagged by Brandon Starcevich until his concussion) and forward Jeremy Cameron (defended by Darcy Gardiner), who had been dominant for Geelong in its preliminary final victory, were both ineffective for Geelong.

=== Medal and cup presenters ===
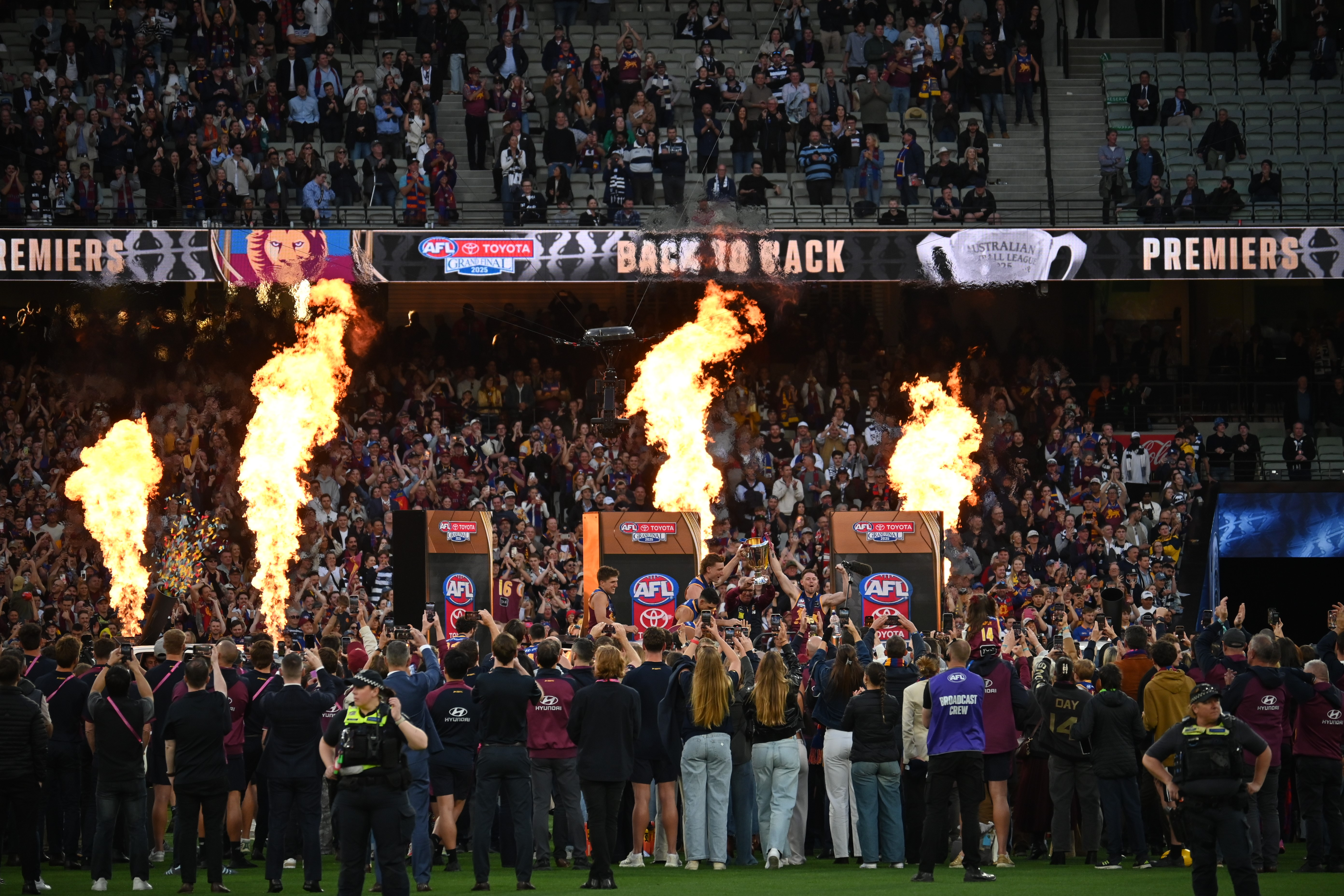
Brisbane Lions captains Harris Andrews and Lachie Neale hoist the premiership cup with coach Chris Fagan

The 2025 AFL Premiership Cup Ambassador was Jack Riewoldt, who carried the cup onto the ground before the match. The cup was presented by three-time premiership forward Jonathan Brown.

The Jock McHale Medal for the premiership-winning coach was presented by 2018 premiership coach Adam Simpson. Four-time Hawthorn premiership player and dual Norm Smith Medallist Luke Hodge presented the Norm Smith Medal to the player judged best on ground, which was Will Ashcroft. The Ron Barassi Medal, awarded to the premiership captains, was presented by 1965 Essendon premiership captain Ken Fraser.

== Teams ==
The teams were announced Thursday, 25 September. Geelong made one change to its preliminary final 23, with ruckman Rhys Stanley replacing five-time All-Australian defender Tom Stewart, who was unavailable after entering the AFL's mandatory 12-day concussion protocols following a heavy tackle in the preliminary final.

Brisbane made one change to its preliminary final 23, with co-captain Lachie Neale returning from a calf injury to replace Jarrod Berry, who dislocated his shoulder in the preliminary final; Neale's injury, suffered in the qualifying final, had initially been expected to require a season-ending four-to-six-week recovery, but he made the recovery in three weeks and was named starting substitute. Coach Chris Fagan acknowledged after the match that he had been nervous about making the selection given Neale's injury cloud, noting that he would have been considered a "total idiot or total genius" depending on the outcome – Sydney coach John Longmire, for example, had drawn criticism in 2022 and 2024 for selecting injured players who were ultimately ineffective – but Neale proved to be a strong positive influence for Brisbane coming off the bench in the second half.

Geelong	Brisbane Lions

Geelong
B:	14 Connor O'Sullivan	16 Sam De Koning	38 Jack Henry
HB:	42 Mark O'Connor	39 Zach Guthrie	17 Lawson Humphries
C:	32 Gryan Miers	9 Max Holmes	28 Oliver Dempsey
HF:	45 Bradley Close	7 Shaun Mannagh	18 Tyson Stengle
F:	33 Shannon Neale	5 Jeremy Cameron	35 Patrick Dangerfield
Foll:	46 Mark Blicavs	3 Bailey Smith	30 Tom Atkins
Int:	1 Rhys Stanley	12 Jack Bowes	34 Oisín Mullin
Int:	13 Jhye Clark	19 Jack Martin (sub)	
Coach:	Chris Scott		
Emg:	10 Mitch Knevitt	24 Jed Bews	36 Oliver Henry

Brisbane Lions
B:	15 Dayne Zorko	27 Darcy Gardiner	35 Ryan Lester
HB:	3 Jaspa Fletcher	31 Harris Andrews	37 Brandon Starcevich
C:	6 Hugh McCluggage	33 Zac Bailey	20 Sam Marshall
HF:	23 Charlie Cameron	22 Ty Gallop	4 Callum Ah Chee
F:	16 Cam Rayner	13 Logan Morris	1 Kai Lohmann
Foll:	32 Darcy Fort	5 Josh Dunkley	8 Will Ashcroft
Int:	10 Levi Ashcroft	38 Bruce Reville	44 Darcy Wilmot
Int:	46 Oscar McInerney	9 Lachie Neale (sub)	
Coach:	Chris Fagan		
Emg:	14 Sam Day	29 James Tunstill	41 Darragh Joyce

=== Umpires ===
The umpiring panel comprised four field umpires, four boundary umpires, two goal umpires and an emergency in each position.

2025 AFL Grand Final umpiring panel
Position					Emergency
Field	12 Andrew Stephens (1)	14 Hayden Meyer (2)	21 Simon Meredith (10)	32 Jacob Mollison (2)	2 Nick Foot
Boundary	Michael Barlow (4)	Daniel Field-Read (2)	Matthew Konetschka (7)	Damien Main (1)	Ian Burrows
Goal	Matthew Dervan (4)	Adam Wojcik (6)			Sam Walsh

Numbers in brackets represent the number of grand finals umpired, including 2025.

== Scorecard ==
Grand Final
Saturday, 27 September (2:30 pm)	Geelong	def. by	Brisbane Lions	Melbourne Cricket Ground (crowd: 100,022)	Report
2.3 (15); 5.6 (36); 6.8 (44); 11.9 (75)	Q1; Q2; Q3; Final	1.6 (12); 5.6 (36); 9.9 (63); 18.14 (122)	Umpires: Stephens, Meyer, Meredith, Mollison; Norm Smith Medal: Will Ashcroft; Television broadcast: Seven Network; National anthem: Vera Blue
Dempsey 4, Blicavs, Bowes, Close, Holmes, Mannagh, Mullin, S. Neale	Goals	C. Cameron 4, McCluggage 4, Bailey 3, Lohmann 2, L. Ashcroft, W. Ashcroft, Morris, L. Neale, C Rayner
Dempsey, Holmes, Humphries, Atkins, Smith	Best	McCluggage, W. Ashcroft, Andrews, Bailey, C. Cameron, Gardiner
J. Cameron (arm)	Injuries	Starcevich (head)

== Media coverage ==
=== Television ===
Seven's coverage, simulcast on streaming service 7+, began at 9 am AEST with the Grand Final Brunch, hosted by Jason Richardson, followed by the Grand Final Countdown from 10:30 am with Rebecca Maddern. Pre-match coverage began from 12 pm with Bruce McAvaney and Hamish McLachlan hosting. The match was commentated by James Brayshaw, Brian Taylor, Luke Hodge, Kane Cornes, Matthew Richardson, Abbey Holmes and Mitch Cleary. The annual North Melbourne Grand Final Breakfast from the Plenary Hall at Melbourne Convention and Exhibition Centre was streamed exclusively on 7+, hosted by Nigel Carmody.

Fox Footy's coverage, simulcast on Kayo Sports, began at 9 am. Fox Footy televised its own Grand Final Day coverage from the AFL Fan Festival in Yarra Park with their own talent, which once again did not include the annual Fox Footy Longest Kick due to a revitalisation project at Birrarung Marr on the banks of the Yarra River. Due to Seven's exclusive rights to the live broadcast, Fox Footy's coverage went dormant during the game, instead showing a full replay at 6 pm AEST. As part of the AFL's 2025–2031 broadcast arrangement, Fox were afforded rights to present their own graphics and commentary to all games, including the delayed broadcast of the grand final. Commentary came from Anthony Hudson, Dwayne Russell, Jason Dunstall and Garry Lyon from Fox Footy's studios in Southbank.

=== Radio ===
Station	Region	Callers	Special Comments	Boundary Rider
Triple M	National	Mark Howard, Nathan Brown	Isaac Smith, Kate McCarthy, Ash Chua (statistician)	Michael Roberts
ABC Sport	National	Corbin Middlemas, Clint Wheeldon	Mick Malthouse, Cameron Ling, Brett Deledio, Ray Chamberlain (rules/umpiring)	Kelli Underwood
AFL Nation	National	Matt Hill, Stephen Quartermain	Dermott Brereton, Brad Johnson	N/A
NIRS	National	Barry Denner, Eugene Warrior	Chris Egan, Robbie AhMat	Kaitlyn Ashmore
3AW (Note: 3AW's coverage was heard on 4BC in Brisbane and FiveAA in Adelaide.)	Melbourne, VIC	Tim Lane, Matt Granland	Matthew Lloyd, Jimmy Bartel	Jacqui Reed
SEN	Melbourne, VIC	Gerard Whateley, Andy Maher	Gerard Healy, Adam Simpson	Sam Edmund
K Rock	Geelong, VIC	Tom King, Ben Casanelia	Mark Neeld	Jason Doherty
6PR	Perth, WA	Adam Papalia, Mark Readings, Karl Langdon	Brad Hardie	Mark Foreman

== See also ==
- 2025 AFL Women's Grand Final
