= Charlie Cameron (footballer, born 1994) =

Australian rules footballer

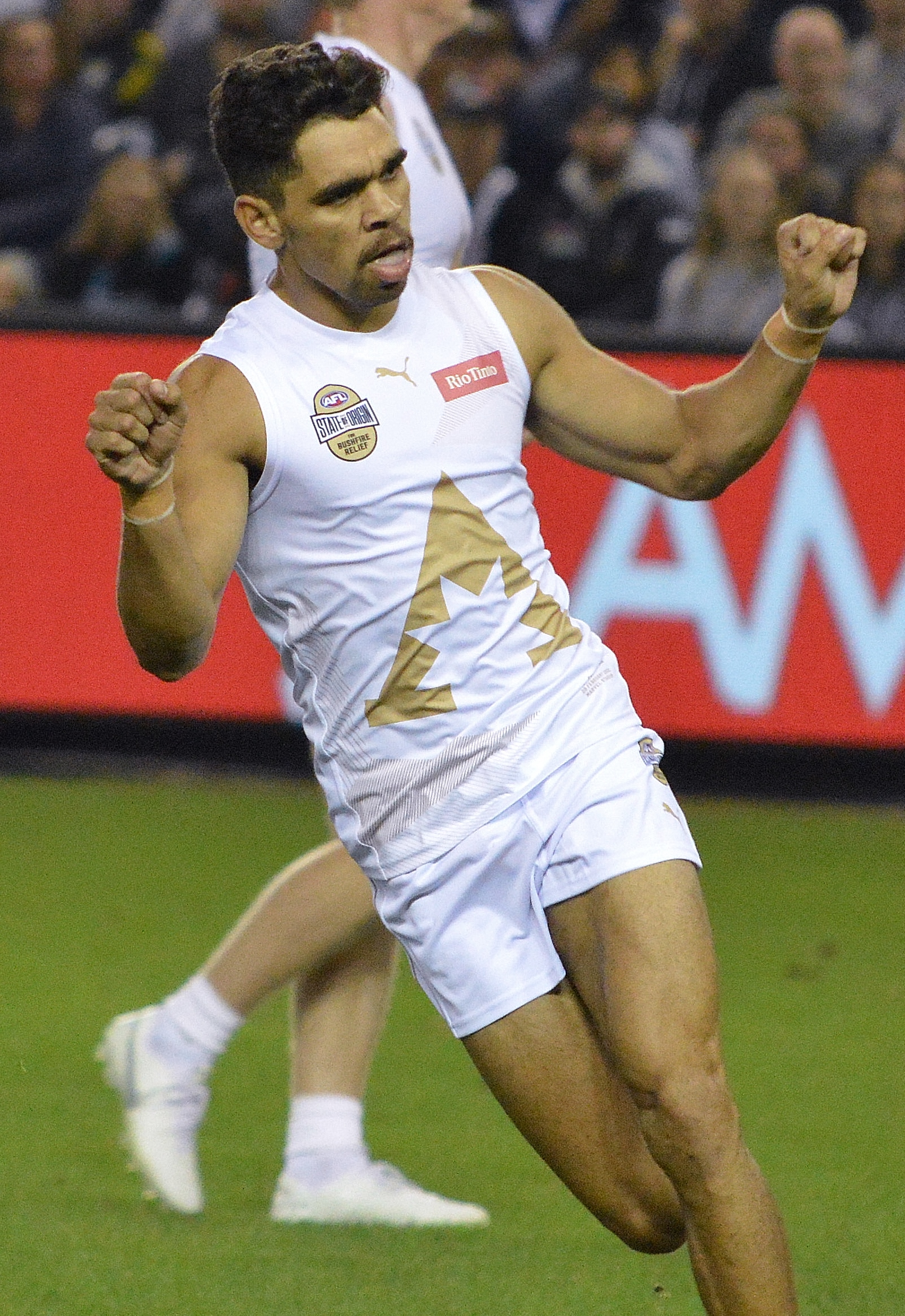
- Cameron performing his signature motorbike goal celebration while playing for the All Stars in 2020

Personal information
- Full name: Charles Mark Cameron
- Nicknames: Chucky, Harley
- Born: 5 July 1994 (age 32); Mount Isa, Queensland
- Original team: Swan Districts (WAFL)
- Draft: No. 7, 2014 rookie draft
- Debut: Round 9, 2014, Adelaide vs. Collingwood, at Adelaide Oval
- Height: 178 cm (5 ft 10 in)
- Weight: 76 kg (168 lb)
- Position: Forward

Club information
- Current club: Brisbane Lions
- Number: 23

Playing career^{1}
Years	Club	Games (Goals)
2014–2017	Adelaide	73 (87)
2018–	Brisbane Lions	203 (397)
Total		276 (484)

Representative team honours
Years	Team	Games (Goals)
2020	All Stars	1 (3)
2025	Indigenous All-Stars	1 (1)
2026	Western Australia	1 (3)
- ^{1} Playing statistics correct to the end of round 23, 2026.

Career highlights
- 3× AFL premiership player: 2024, 2025, 2026; 2× All-Australian team: 2019, 2023; 4× Brisbane Lions leading goalkicker: 2019, 2020, 2021, 2022; AFL Rising Star nominee: 2015; Marcus Ashcroft Medal: 2019; Signature

Charles Mark Cameron (born 5 July 1994) is a professional Australian rules footballer playing for the Brisbane Lions in the Australian Football League (AFL). He previously played for the Adelaide Football Club from 2014 to 2017. Cameron is a 3 time AFL premiership player with the Brisbane Lions. He is a 4 time leading goalkicker at the club and as at 2026 has the 4th most goals in its history. Cameron is a two time All-Australian and considered one of the greatest goalkickers in AFL finals history.

A small forward and goalsneak, Cameron is known for his showmanship and his goal celebrations. His goal song, "Country Roads", has become closely associated with him. The song and his celebration of revving imaginary motorbike handlebars have become familiar parts of his interaction with the crowd.

== Early life ==
Cameron was born in Mount Isa, Queensland, into an Aboriginal Australian family (Lardil and Waanyi). Cameron's family left Mount Isa moving 440 kilometres north to Gununa on Mornington Island in the Gulf of Carpentaria when he was just 2 years old. He attended Mornington State School. Like many children there, where it is the most popular sport, he followed rugby league, Cameron was a Melbourne Storm supporter and aspired to play it professionally. Cameron was informally introduced to Australian rules football through AFL Cape York. In his final year of primary school, he played one of his first organised games when he was selected to represent the Crusaders team in the Queensland U14 country championships in Townsville. He moved to Brisbane at the age of 12 to board at Marist College Ashgrove.

As a schoolboy he played cricket, rugby league and rugby union at high levels. He also continued his Australian rules development in high school, playing several games for Marist in 2008. His raw athletic attributes saw him recruited by the Brisbane Lions Academy during his last year at the school. However he quit the academy after six months to focus on playing school rugby union. Following graduation in late 2011, at the age of 17, Cameron moved with his family to Newman, Western Australia. His brother, Jarrod, is a former professional Australian rules footballer who played for the West Coast Eagles.

== Pre-AFL career ==
While in Newman, Cameron was talked into playing for the local football team, the Newman Saints. He began playing club football for the first time for the Saints in 2012 and impressed so much that, towards the end of the season, he was invited to play for the Swan Districts Football Club and played three Colts games. Entering his first pre-season ever with Swan Districts in 2013, he impressed the coaches so much that he earned a spot in the senior team for the first round of the 2013 WAFL season, and represented Western Australia at the 2013 AFL Under 18 Championships, which led to him being picked up by Adelaide with pick 7 in the 2014 rookie draft despite only having played a total of 30–40 games of Australian rules football.

== AFL career ==
=== Adelaide ===
Cameron showed excellent form in the SANFL early in his first season, and was rewarded with a promotion to the senior list, replacing the injured Nathan van Berlo. He made his debut in round 9 against Collingwood, kicking a goal and evading a tackle to set up another. Cameron went on to play seven AFL games in 2014 despite battling a groin injury, kicking nine goals including a bag of three against Fremantle in round 12. At the end of the season he won the Crows' Mark Bickley Emerging Talent Award.

Cameron cemented his place in Adelaide's best 22 in 2015, playing 22 games for 29 goals and 17 goal assists. Highlights included a career-best four goals against the Gold Coast in round 17, and kicking the winning goal in Adelaide's elimination final victory over the Western Bulldogs. Cameron was nominated for the 2015 AFL Rising Star award for his performance against the Brisbane Lions in round 13, in which he kicked a goal and had three goal assists, five tackles and seven inside 50s.

In Round 9, 2017 Cameron starred against the Brisbane Lions, kicking four goals in the third quarter, including a run which involved two bounces, and a high pack mark. He had another impressive performance the next week in Sir Doug Nicholls Indigenous Round, kicking three goals against Fremantle in a 100-point win. He was a member of the Crows' 2017 Grand Final losing team.

In October 2017, Cameron requested a trade home to Queensland with Brisbane being his preferred destination despite being contracted to Adelaide until the end of the 2018 season. He was officially traded to Brisbane during the trade period.

His long time small forward mentor at Adelaide, Eddie Betts in 2020 predicted he would become "the best small forward that ever played this game".

=== Brisbane ===
Cameron helped the Brisbane Lions reach the finals from 2019 to 2022. In April 2022, Cameron was subjected to racial abuse. The incident was being investigated by AFL's integrity unit. In the semi-final of the 2022 AFL season against the Melbourne Demons, he marked the ball in the dying minutes of the game just inside the boundary line and converted the set shot to advance the Lions to the preliminary final.

Cameron kicked a goal in the 2023 Grand Final to put the Lions ahead of Collingwood with just minutes remaining, but ultimately Brisbane lost the game.

In July 2024, Cameron signed a three-year contract extension with the Lions. He went on to help the Lions win the 2024 AFL premiership, kicking a goal in a 60-point Grand Final victory over the Sydney Swans.

== Statistics ==
Updated to the end of round 22, 2026.

Legend
G	Goals	K	Kicks	D	Disposals	T	Tackles
B	Behinds	H	Handballs	M	Marks
#	Played in that season's premiership team

Season	Team	No.	Games	Totals							Averages (per game)							Votes
Season	Team	No.	Games	G	B	K	H	D	M	T	G	B	K	H	D	M	T	Votes
2014	Adelaide	42	7	9	10	36	26	62	11	24	1.3	1.4	5.1	3.7	8.9	1.6	3.4	0
2015	Adelaide	23	22	29	24	151	74	225	61	62	1.3	1.1	6.9	3.4	10.2	2.8	2.8	0
2016	Adelaide	23	20	20	18	174	94	268	56	87	1.0	0.9	8.7	4.7	13.4	2.8	4.4	0
2017	Adelaide	23	24	29	25	227	107	334	67	103	1.2	1.0	9.5	4.5	13.9	2.8	4.3	0
2018	Brisbane Lions	23	11	17	4	104	37	141	47	27	1.5	0.4	9.5	3.4	12.8	4.3	2.5	0
2019	Brisbane Lions	23	24	57	32	217	78	295	81	49	2.4	1.3	9.0	3.3	12.3	3.4	2.0	11
2020 (Note: The 2020 season was played with 17 home-and-away matches per team (down from 22) and 16-minute quarters with time on (down from 20-minute quarters with time on) due to the impact of the COVID-19 pandemic.)	Brisbane Lions	23	19	31	22	140	38	178	64	41	1.6	1.2	7.4	2.0	9.4	3.4	2.2	1
2021	Brisbane Lions	23	24	55	33	199	62	261	95	53	2.3	1.4	8.3	2.6	10.9	4.0	2.2	1
2022	Brisbane Lions	23	25	54	21	201	84	285	96	77	2.2	0.8	8.0	3.4	11.4	3.8	3.1	3
2023	Brisbane Lions	23	26	59	27	196	61	257	88	76	2.3	1.0	7.5	2.3	9.9	3.4	2.9	8
2024^{#}	Brisbane Lions	23	27	44	30	230	58	288	109	58	1.6	1.1	8.5	2.1	10.7	4.0	2.1	1
2025^{#}	Brisbane Lions	23	25	32	33	181	59	240	89	55	1.3	1.3	7.2	2.4	9.6	3.6	2.2	0
2026	Brisbane Lions	23	21	46	21	197	47	244	79	47	2.2	1.0	9.4	2.2	11.6	3.8	2.2	0
Career			275	482	300	2253	825	3078	943	759	1.8	1.1	8.2	3.0	11.2	3.4	2.8	25

== Honours and achievements ==
Team

- 3× AFL premiership player: 2024, 2025, 2026 (Brisbane Lions)
- 2× McClelland Trophy: 2017 (Adelaide Crows) Minor Premiership, 2025 (Brisbane Lions) Club Championship

Individual

- All-Australian team: 2019
- 4× Brisbane Lions leading goalkicker: 2019 (57), 2020 (32), 2021 (55), 2022 (54)
- All Stars Representative Honours in Bushfire Relief Match: 2020
- Marcus Ashcroft Medal: 2019 (round 21)
- AFL Rising Star nominee: 2015 (round 13)
- AFL Grand Final player: 2017, 2023, 2024, 2025
