= 2023 Brownlow Medal =

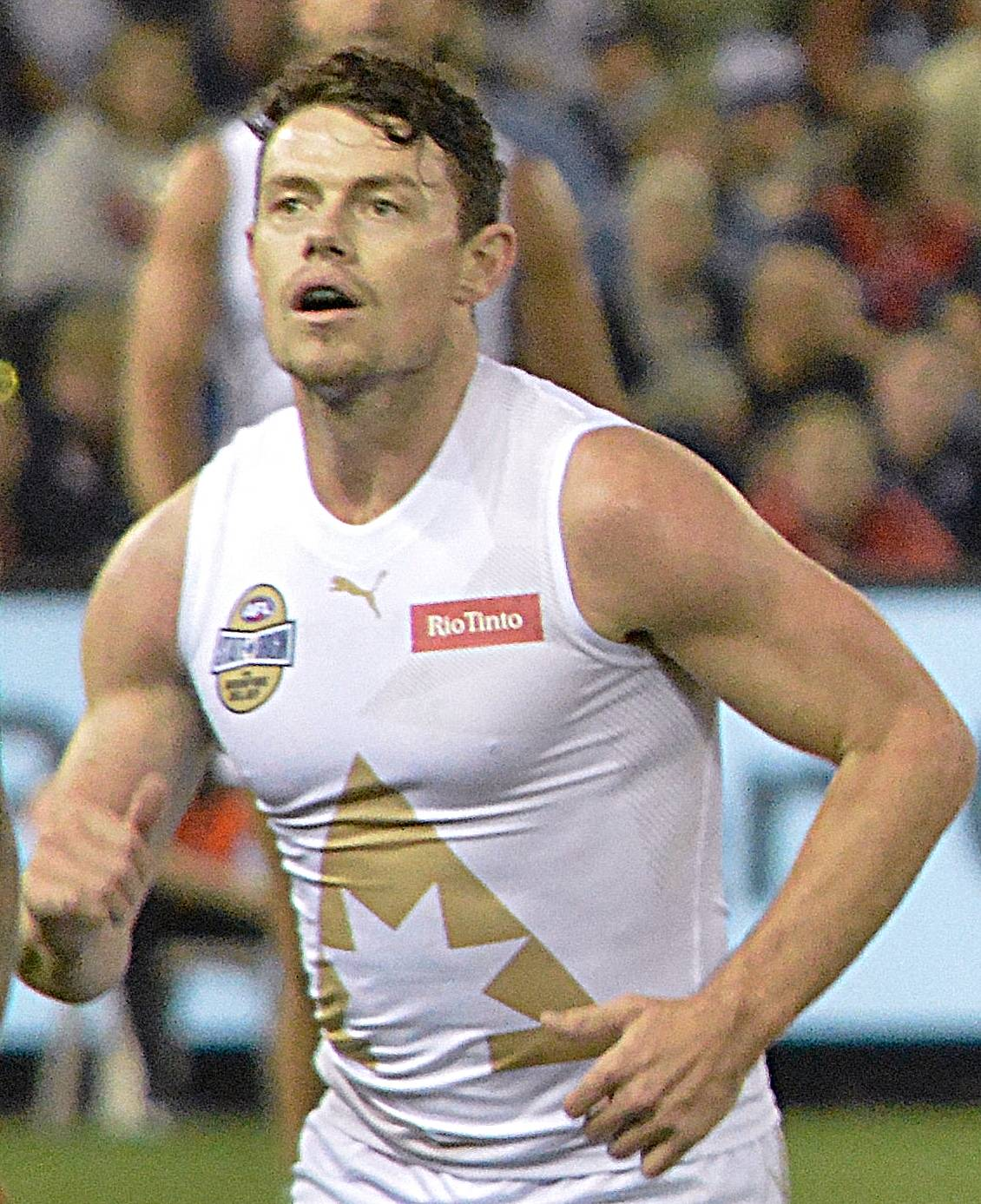
- 2023 Brownlow Medallist, Lachie Neale
- Date: Monday, 25 September 2023
- Location: Crown Palladium
- Hosted by: Hamish McLachlan and Rebecca Maddern
- Winner: Lachie Neale (Brisbane Lions)

Television/radio coverage
- Network: Seven Network; Telstra

The 2023 Brownlow Medal was the 96th year the award was presented to the player adjudged the best and fairest player during the Australian Football League (AFL) home-and-away season. It was won by Lachie Neale for the second time, with 31 votes; Neale had previously won the medal in 2020. The count took place on Monday 25 September, five days before the grand final. Neale had been only fifth favourite in Brownlow Medal betting markets prior to the count, and his victory was considered a surprise.

== Leading vote-getters ==
| | Player | Votes |
|---|---|---|
| 1st | Lachie Neale (Brisbane Lions) | 31 |
| 2nd | Marcus Bontempelli (Western Bulldogs) | 29 |
| 3rd | Nick Daicos (Collingwood) | 28 |
| =4th | Errol Gulden (Sydney) | 27 |
| =4th | Zak Butters (Port Adelaide) | 27 |
| 6th | Christian Petracca (Melbourne) | 26 |
| 7th | Jack Viney (Melbourne) | 24 |
| | Caleb Serong (Fremantle) | 24* |
| =8th | Patrick Cripps (Carlton) | 22 |
| =8th | Noah Anderson (Gold Coast) | 22 |
| =10th | Connor Rozee (Port Adelaide) | 21 |
| =10th | Jack Sinclair (St Kilda) | 21 |

* The player was ineligible to win the medal due to suspension by the AFL Tribunal during the year.

== Voting procedure ==
The four field umpires (those umpires who control the flow of the game, as opposed to goal or boundary umpires) confer after each match and award three votes, two votes, and one vote to the players they regard as the best, second-best and third-best in the match, respectively. The votes are kept secret until the awards night, and they are read and tallied on the evening.
