= Jaspa Fletcher =

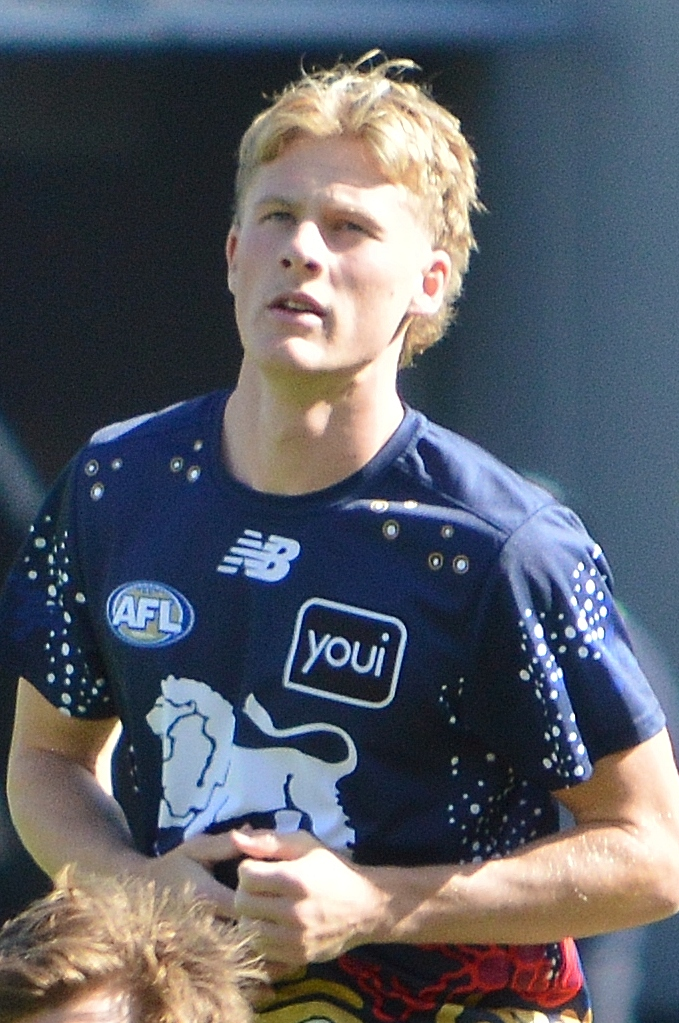
- Fletcher in April 2025

Personal information
- Full name: Jaspa Fletcher
- Born: 24 February 2004 (age 22)
- Original team: Coorparoo
- Draft: No. 12 2022 national draft
- Height: 184 cm (6 ft 0 in)
- Position: Defender

Club information
- Current club: Brisbane Lions
- Number: 3

Playing career^{1}
Years	Club	Games (Goals)
2023–	Brisbane Lions	89 (23)
- ^{1} Playing statistics correct to the end of round 22, 2026.

Career highlights
- 3x AFL premiership player: 2024, 2025, 2026; AFL Rising Star nominee: 2023

Jaspa Fletcher (born 24 February 2004) is a professional Australian rules footballer who plays for the Brisbane Lions. Fletcher, whose father Adrian also played for the Lions, was a part of Brisbane's 2024 premiership and 2025 wins.

== Early career ==
Fletcher was born in Victoria but moved to Brisbane at three years of age in late 2007 when his father, Adrian, accepted an assistant coaching role with the Brisbane Lions. His father is a 231-game former AFL player for Geelong (23), St Kilda (22), Brisbane Bears/Lions (107) and Fremantle (79) and his mother, Narelle, is a 296-game former WNBL player for Canberra, Melbourne, Perth and Dandenong as well as an Australian national team representative.

Jaspa attended Camp Hill State Infants and Primary School and later Brisbane State High School and initially played junior football for Coorparoo in the local Brisbane league before switching to the Sherwood Districts in 2021 when his father was appointed head coach of the club. While playing for Coorparoo at 12 years of age, he was invited to participate in the Brisbane Lions Academy. Fletcher made his senior debut for Sherwood Districts at 17 years of age in round 3 of the 2021 QAFL season and played bottom age U18 representative football for the Brisbane Lions academy team in the NAB League as well as for Queensland in the 2021 AFL Under-19 Championships.

In his final year of junior football, Fletcher captained both the Brisbane Lions academy and the Allies teams in their respective representative competitions and his efforts led to selection in the 2022 U18 All-Australian alongside fellow future Brisbane Lions father-son teammate Will Ashcroft. The Brisbane Lions elected to match a father-son bid for Fletcher with pick 12 in the 2022 AFL draft.

== AFL career ==
Fletcher was selected to make his AFL debut for the Brisbane Lions in round 14 of the 2023 AFL season against the Sydney Swans at the Gabba and kicked a goal on debut. He received a Rising Star nomination in round 19 with 19 disposals and 8 marks against Geelong. A career-best three goals in Fletcher's first final against Port Adelaide assisted the Lions to a home preliminary final. Fletcher played in the 2023 Grand Final in just his first senior season, but the Lions narrowly lost to Collingwood.

Fletcher was part of the Brisbane Lions 2024 premiership winning team in just his second season in the AFL. Fletcher was among Brisbane's best, collecting 18 disposals and 7 marks against Sydney.

== Statistics ==
Updated to the end of round 22, 2026.

Legend
G	Goals	K	Kicks	D	Disposals	T	Tackles
B	Behinds	H	Handballs	M	Marks
#	Played in that season's premiership team

Season	Team	No.	Games	Totals							Averages (per game)							Votes
Season	Team	No.	Games	G	B	K	H	D	M	T	G	B	K	H	D	M	T	Votes
2023	Brisbane Lions	28	14	8	6	102	63	165	65	17	0.6	0.4	7.3	4.5	11.8	4.6	1.2	0
2024^{#}	Brisbane Lions	28	27	5	8	219	174	393	133	52	0.2	0.3	8.1	6.4	14.6	4.9	1.9	0
2025^{#}	Brisbane Lions	3	27	7	2	373	202	575	181	45	0.3	0.1	13.8	7.5	21.3	6.7	1.7	2
2026	Brisbane Lions	3	21	3	1	258	143	401	114	35	0.1	0.0	12.3	6.8	19.1	5.4	1.7	0
Career			89	23	17	952	582	1534	493	149	0.3	0.2	10.7	6.5	17.2	5.5	1.7	2

== Honours and achievements ==
Team

- AFL premiership player: 2024, 2025, 2026
- McClelland Trophy/Club Championship: 2025

Individual

- AFL Rising Star nominee: 2023
