= Bruce Reville =

Australian rules footballer

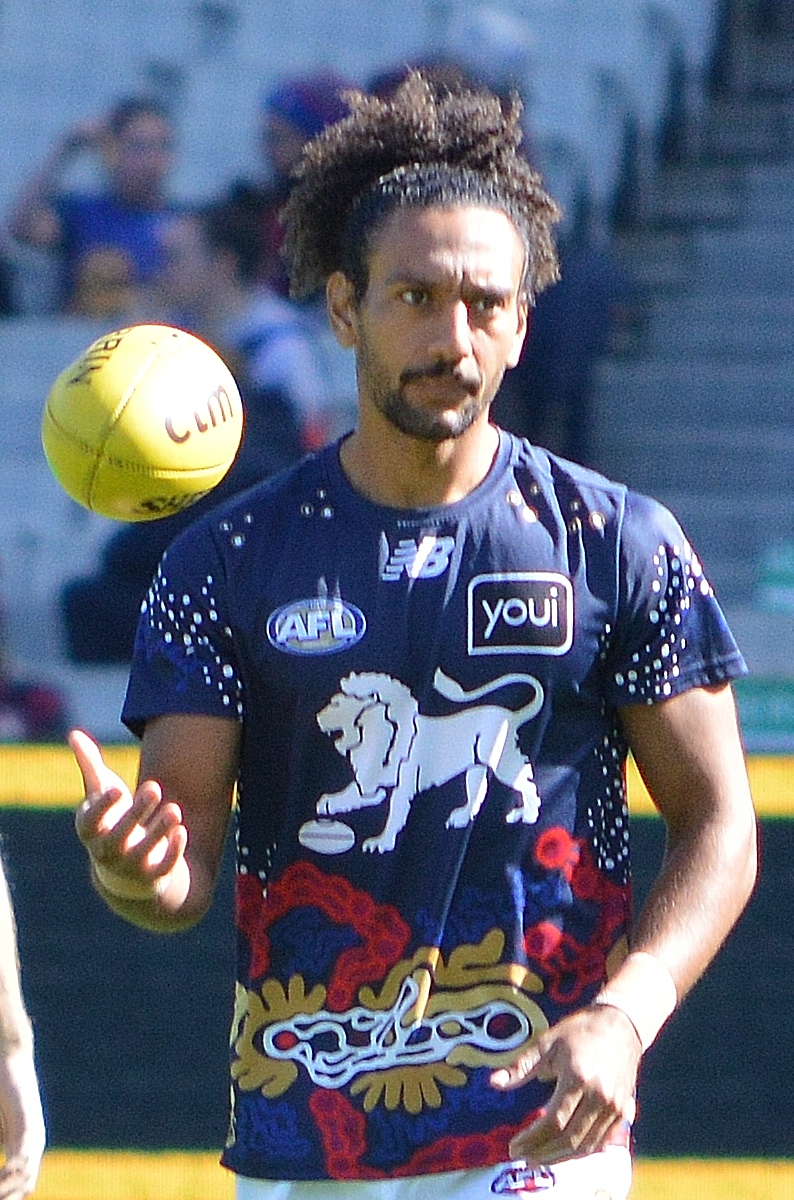
- Reville in April 2025

Personal information
- Born: 22 February 2001 (age 25); Port Moresby, Papua New Guinea
- Original teams: Brisbane (VFL); Sherwood Districts (QAFL)
- Draft: Category B rookie, 2023
- Debut: Round 8, 2024, Brisbane Lions vs. Gold Coast, at The Gabba
- Height: 185 cm (6 ft 1 in)
- Position: Midfielder

Club information
- Current club: Brisbane Lions
- Number: 38

Playing career^{1}
| Years | Club | Games (Goals) |
| 2024– | Brisbane Lions | 43 (12) |
- ^{1} Playing statistics correct to the end of 2026.

Career highlights
- AFL premiership player: 2025

Bruce Reville (born 22 February 2001) is an Australian rules footballer who plays for the Brisbane Lions in the Australian Football League (AFL).

== Early life ==
Born in Port Moresby in 2001, Reville and his family migrated to Cairns, Queensland when he was age four. They then moved to the coastal town of Burrum Heads and he played football with the local Burrum Joeys under-9 team. Reville then played for the Maryborough Bears, a half-hour drive from Burrum Heads.

Reville then moved to Brisbane and played local football for Sherwood Magpies AFC before being picked up in Brisbane Lions' Academy program in 2012. He played for Sherwood in the Queensland Australian Football League (QAFL) between 2016 and 2021 before joining Brisbane's Victorian Football League (VFL) team, the reserves side for the AFL team, in 2021.

== AFL career ==
Following his 2024 debut, Reville became the first Brisbane Lion to wear the number 38 in a senior AFL match.

Reville made his AFL debut in the round 8 QClash against Gold Coast at the Gabba. He collected 13 disposals and four marks in the rivalry win. Reville went on to play 12 games and kick four goals in the 2024 season, but did not play in Brisbane's premiership-winning finals series. Reville signed a contract extension to keep him at the Lions for a further year.

Reville was part of Brisbane's 2025 premiership side.

During the 2026 AFL season, Reville signed a three-year contract extension to the end of 2029.

== Statistics ==
Updated to the end of round 22, 2026.

Legend
| G | Goals | K | Kicks | D | Disposals | T | Tackles |
| B | Behinds | H | Handballs | M | Marks |
| # | Played in that season's premiership team |

| Season | Team | No. | Games | Totals | | | | | | | Averages (per game) | | | | | | | Votes |
| Season | Team | No. | Games | G | B | K | H | D | M | T | G | B | K | H | D | M | T | Votes |
|---|---|---|---|---|---|---|---|---|---|---|---|---|---|---|---|---|---|---|
| 2024 | Brisbane Lions | 38 | 12 | 4 | 2 | 95 | 34 | 129 | 42 | 19 | 0.3 | 0.2 | 7.9 | 2.8 | 10.8 | 3.5 | 1.6 | 0 |
| 2025^{#} | Brisbane Lions | 38 | 13 | 3 | 3 | 78 | 42 | 120 | 39 | 19 | 0.2 | 0.2 | 6.0 | 3.2 | 9.2 | 3.0 | 1.5 | 0 |
| 2026 | Brisbane Lions | 38 | 18 | 5 | 9 | 184 | 92 | 276 | 87 | 23 | 0.3 | 0.5 | 10.2 | 5.1 | 15.3 | 4.8 | 1.3 | 0 |
| Career | | | 43 | 12 | 14 | 357 | 168 | 525 | 168 | 61 | 0.3 | 0.3 | 8.3 | 3.9 | 12.2 | 3.9 | 1.4 | 0 |
