= Harris Andrews =

Australian rules footballer

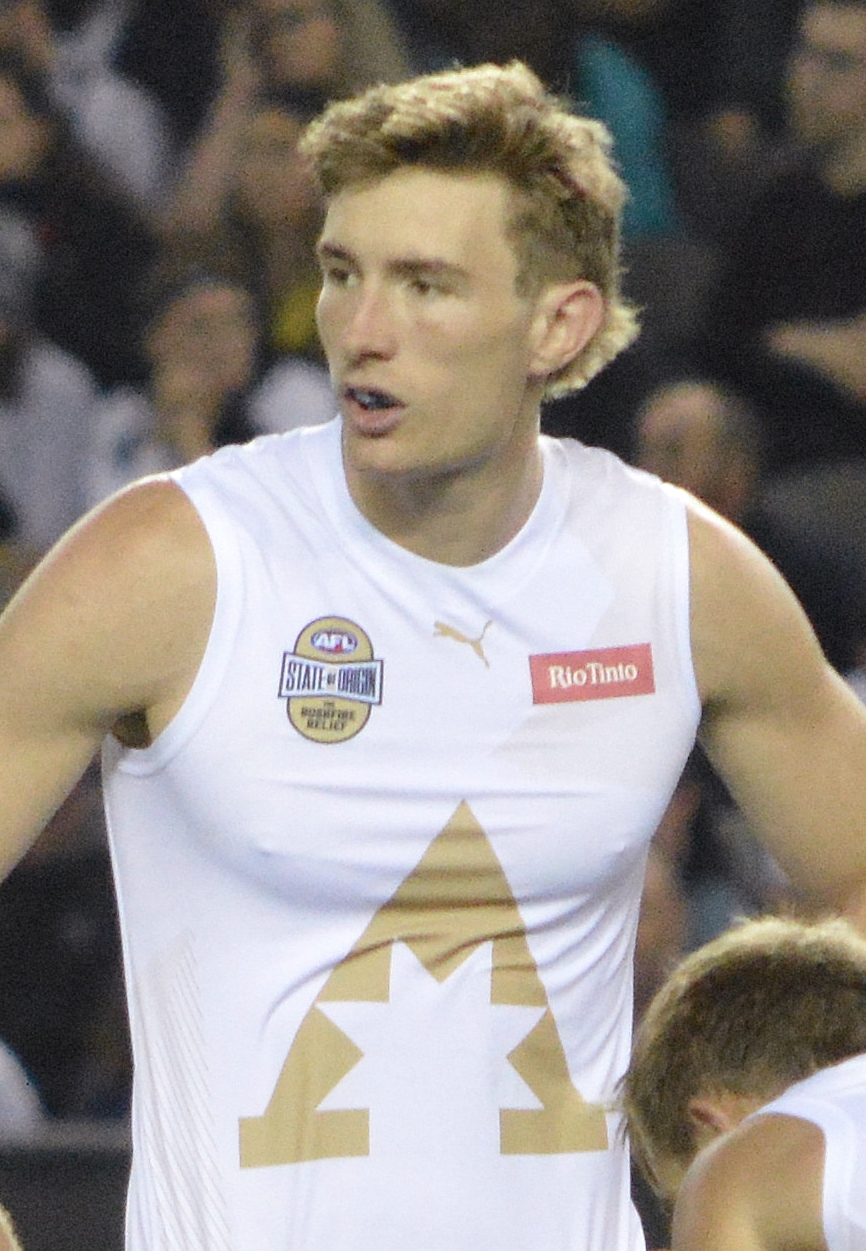
- Andrews during the State of Origin for Bushfire Relief Match, February 2020

Personal information
- Full name: Harris Michael Johnston Andrews
- Born: 11 December 1996 (age 29); Fitzroy, Victoria
- Original team: Aspley (NEAFL)/Brisbane Lions Academy
- Draft: No. 61, 2014 national draft
- Height: 200 cm (6 ft 7 in)
- Weight: 100 kg (220 lb)
- Position: Key defender

Club information
- Current club: Brisbane Lions
- Number: 31

Playing career^{1}
Years	Club	Games (Goals)
2015–	Brisbane Lions	263 (11)

Representative team honours
Years	Team	Games (Goals)
2020	All Stars	1 (0)
- ^{1} Playing statistics correct to the end of 2026.

Career highlights
- 3× AFL premiership captain: 2024, 2025, 2026; Brisbane Lions co-captain: 2023–present; 4× All-Australian team: 2019, 2020, 2025, 2026; Brisbane Lions vice-captain: 2018–2022; 3× 22under22 team: 2017, 2018, 2019 (C); Merrett–Murray Medal: 2023; AFL Rising Star nominee: 2015; Jim Stynes Community Leadership Award: 2025; Signature

Harris Michael Johnston Andrews (born 11 December 1996) is an Australian rules footballer and the captain of the Brisbane Lions in the Australian Football League (AFL).

== Early life ==
Andrews was born in Fitzroy in Melbourne in 1996. He moved to Brisbane’s northern suburbs with his family in 2000 at the age of 4. There he participated in the Auskick program at Aspley and began playing junior football for the Aspley Football Club at five years of age. He attended Aspley State Primary School followed by Padua College for his senior schooling and was recruited to the Brisbane Lions Academy as a 17 year old. In 2013, Andrews was the leading goal kicker in the NEAFL under 18 competition, with 80 goals in 17 games. In 2014, Andrews played as a key position defender while representing Queensland in the TAC Cup and the 2014 AFL Under 18 Championships. The Brisbane Lions selected him with the 61st pick at the 2014 AFL draft.

== AFL career ==
Andrews played his first game in round 3 of the 2015 season against Richmond, scoring a debut goal from more than 50 metres. He was nominated for NAB Rising Star Nominee in Round 18. He was included in the AFL 22 under 22 Team 2017/2018 and named Captain in 2019. Andrews was voted Most Professional Player at Brisbane four years in a row, from 2017 through to 2020. In May 2018, Andrews was appointed vice-captain of the Lions.

In round 10, 2018 he set a league record for the most one percenters in a single match, having recorded 26 in a loss to Sydney at The Gabba. In 2019 and 2020, Andrews received All-Australian honours in back-to-back years.

In 2023, Andrews was appointed co-captain of the Brisbane Lions alongside Lachie Neale. Andrews played in the Grand Final defeat to Collingwood in his first season as captain. Andrews overcame his co-captain, who had won the Brownlow Medal for the season, to win his first Merrett–Murray Medal.

During 2024, Andrews extended his contract with the Lions until at least the end of 2029. As co-captain, he was a part of Brisbane's 2024 premiership winning team. As the premiership captain, Andrews was presented with the inaugural Ron Barassi Medal alongside co-captain Lachie Neale.

Andrews would go on to captain the Lions to two more consecutive premierships in 2025 and 2026.

== Statistics ==
Updated to the end of round 22, 2026.

Legend
G	Goals	K	Kicks	D	Disposals	T	Tackles
B	Behinds	H	Handballs	M	Marks
#	Played in that season's premiership team	†	Led the league for the season

Season	Team	No.	Games	Totals							Averages (per game)							Votes
Season	Team	No.	Games	G	B	K	H	D	M	T	G	B	K	H	D	M	T	Votes
2015	Brisbane Lions	31	19	4	2	118	103	221	100	28	0.2	0.1	6.2	5.4	11.6	5.3	1.5	0
2016	Brisbane Lions	31	17	2	1	98	77	175	72	38	0.1	0.1	5.8	4.5	10.3	4.2	2.2	0
2017	Brisbane Lions	31	22	2	0	170	116	286	138	22	0.1	0.0	7.7	5.3	13.0	6.3	1.0	0
2018	Brisbane Lions	31	18	1	1	168	113	281	119	39	0.1	0.1	9.3	6.3	15.6	6.6	2.2	2
2019	Brisbane Lions	31	21	0	0	163	106	269	116	33	0.0	0.0	7.8	5.0	12.8	5.5	1.6	2
2020 (Note: The 2020 season was played with 17 home-and-away matches per team (down from 22) and 16-minute quarters with time on (down from 20-minute quarters with time on) due to the impact of the COVID-19 pandemic.)	Brisbane Lions	31	16	0	0	113	58	171	70	17	0.0	0.0	7.1	3.6	10.7	4.4	1.1	4
2021	Brisbane Lions	31	23	1	1	219	132	351	181	29	0.0	0.0	9.5	5.7	15.3	7.9	1.3	0
2022	Brisbane Lions	31	24	0	0	208	93	301	154	29	0.0	0.0	8.7	3.9	12.5	6.4	1.2	0
2023	Brisbane Lions	31	26	1	0	281	88	369	203	31	0.0	0.0	10.8	3.4	14.2	7.8	1.2	8
2024^{#}	Brisbane Lions	31	26	0	0	250	99	349	195	36	0.0	0.0	9.6	3.8	13.4	7.5	1.4	3
2025^{#}	Brisbane Lions	31	27	0	1	284	99	383	221^{†}	32	0.0	0.0	10.5	3.7	14.2	8.2	1.2	5
2026^{#}	Brisbane Lions	31	18	0	0	173	99	272	141	23	0.0	0.0	9.6	5.5	15.1	7.8	1.3	0
Career			257	11	6	2245	1183	3428	1710	357	0.0	0.0	8.7	4.6	13.3	6.7	1.4	24

== Honours and achievements ==
Team

- 3× AFL Premiership Player (Brisbane Lions) 2024, 2025, 2026
- McClelland Trophy/Club Championship (Brisbane Lions) 2025

Individual

- 2× AFL premiership captain: 2024, 2025
- 4× All-Australian team: 2019, 2020, 2025, 2026
- All Stars Representative Honours in Bushfire Relief Match: 2020
- 3× 22under22 team: 2017, 2018, 2019 (c)
- AFL Rising Star nominee: 2015 (round 18)
