= Jack Bowes =

Australian rules footballer (born 1998)

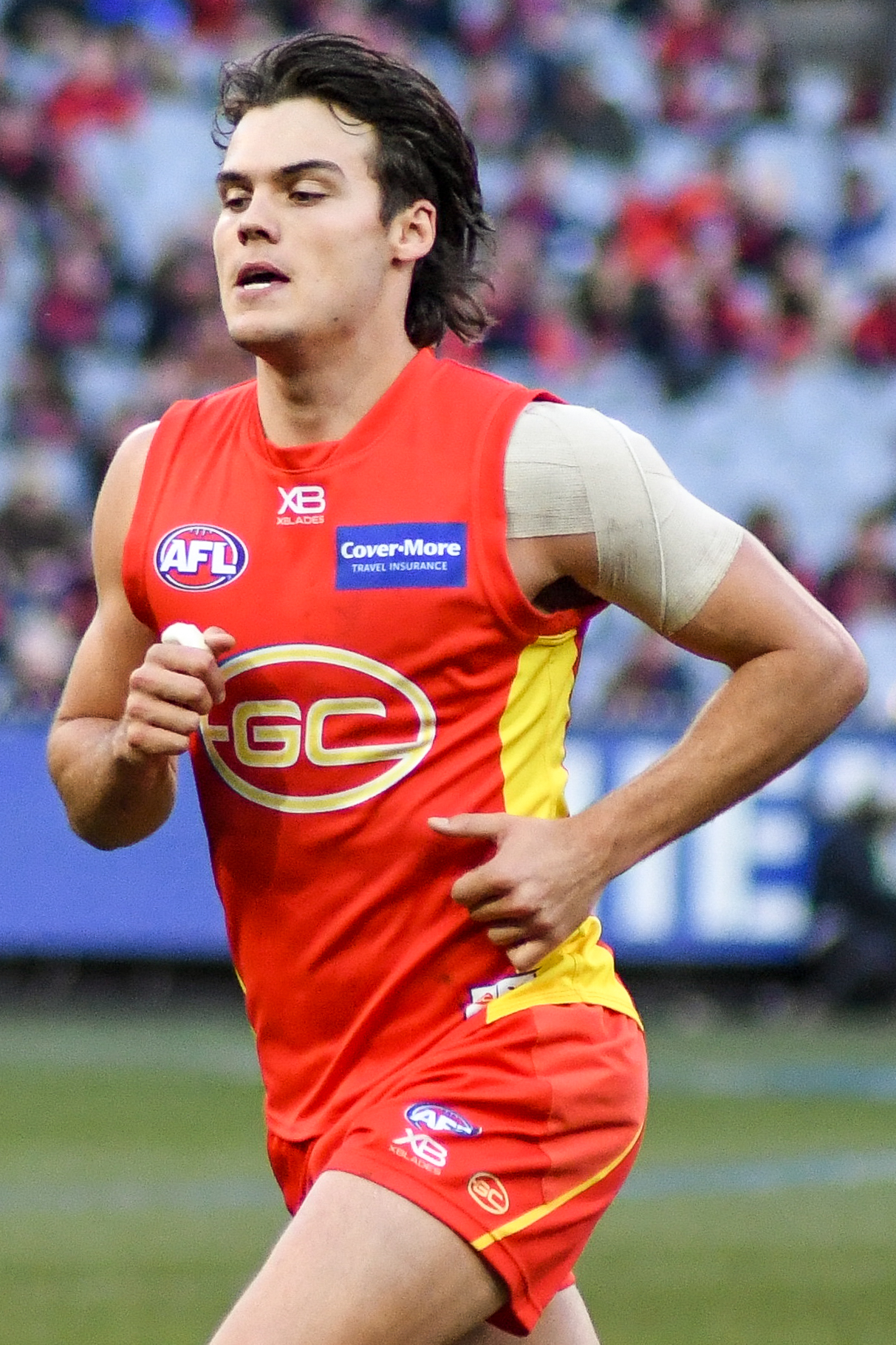
- Bowes playing for Gold Coast in 2018

Personal information
- Full name: Jack Bowes
- Born: 26 January 1998 (age 28); Cairns, Queensland
- Original team: Surfers Paradise (QAFL)
- Draft: No. 10, 2016 national draft
- Height: 187 cm (6 ft 2 in)
- Weight: 85 kg (187 lb)
- Position: Midfielder

Club information
- Current club: Essendon

Playing career^{1}
Years	Club	Games (Goals)
2017–2022	Gold Coast	83 (14)
2023–2026	Geelong	69 (39)
2027–	Essendon	0 (0)
Total		152 (53)
- ^{1} Playing statistics correct to the end of the 2026 season.

Jack Bowes (born 26 January 1998) is an Australian rules footballer playing for the Essendon Football Club in the Australian Football League (AFL). He previously played for the Gold Coast Suns from 2017 to 2022 and the Geelong Football Club from 2023 to 2026.

== Early life ==
Bowes was born and raised in Cairns, Queensland and attended St Augustine's College. His parents, originally from Victoria decided to move there shortly before he was born. His great uncle, Bill Bowes, was an international English cricketer who famously bowled Don Bradman on the first ball in the 1932–33 Ashes series. Jack began playing junior football with the Manunda Hawks Australian Football club before moving to the Cairns Saints Football Club in the AFL Cairns competition. As a junior, he was a standout and was placed in the Gold Coast Suns Academy at the age of thirteen. In 2014, he made his senior debut for Cairns Saints as a sixteen year old and went on to play in a losing AFL Cairns seniors grand final that year where he managed a goal in a sixteen-point loss to Port Douglas. He grew up supporting St Kilda.

He made the decision to relocate to the Gold Coast at the beginning of 2015 to increase his chances of being drafted. There he continued playing football for the Surfers Paradise Demons in the Queensland Australian Football League (QAFL) as well as Gold Coast's reserves team in the North East Australian Football League (NEAFL). His 2015 NEAFL debut for the Gold Coast reserves included twenty-two disposals and one goal. He was selected to represent the under 17 AFL academy team in the 2015 AFL Grand Final curtain raiser and shone in a sixteen possession performance. He also completed his schooling in 2015 at All Saints Anglican School.

Bowes entered the final year of his junior football in 2016 and was predicted by many analysts to be selected with the first pick in the 2016 AFL draft. Bowes was named captain of the Queensland team that would compete in the 2016 division two AFL Under 18 Championships and led the team to several victories, the best being against Northern Territory. His performances in the championships saw him rewarded with the Hunter Harrison Medal as the best division two player.

Bowes was then selected to captain the Allies in the division one championships and was named in the 2016 under 18 All-Australian team as a result of his performances for the Allies. He was also chosen to represent team Judd in the 2016 all stars under-18 clash at Punt Road Oval, where he amassed twenty-three disposals.

== AFL career ==
Bowes was recruited by the Gold Coast Football Club with their fourth selection and tenth overall in the 2016 national draft; he was initially bid on by the Sydney Swans, but Gold Coast matched the bid.

In 2019, Bowes started with a run with role player. He put down players like Fyfe and Cripps. Bowes had a quad injury in the middle of the season, but recovered from it. Jack Bowes averaged 18.3 disposals and 3.7 tackles.

In April 2019 Bowes kicked a goal in the final seconds of a match to snatch the lead from Carlton in what turned out as a 2 point victory for the Suns.

Bowes was traded to Geelong as part of a salary dump at the end of the 2022 AFL season. Bowes featured in Geelong's 2025 AFL Grand Final side, losing to the Brisbane Lions by 47 points.

After only managing nine senior appearances for the Cats in 2026, Bowes requested a trade to Essendon. Bowes was later a part of a trade which sent Jordan Ridley to Geelong along with pick No.60 and a 2028 fourth-round pick in exchange for Bowes, a 2027 first-round pick and a 2028 second-round pick heading to Essendon.

== Statistics ==
Updated to the end of the 2026 season.

Legend
G	Goals	K	Kicks	D	Disposals	T	Tackles
B	Behinds	H	Handballs	M	Marks

Season	Team	No.	Games	Totals							Averages (per game)							Votes
Season	Team	No.	Games	G	B	K	H	D	M	T	G	B	K	H	D	M	T	Votes
2017	Gold Coast	29	11	2	2	76	61	137	32	25	0.2	0.2	6.9	5.5	12.5	2.9	2.3	0
2018	Gold Coast	29	16	4	5	174	85	259	67	37	0.3	0.3	10.9	5.3	16.2	4.2	2.3	0
2019	Gold Coast	3	15	6	3	139	137	276	53	55	0.4	0.2	9.3	9.1	18.4	3.5	3.7	0
2020 (Note: The 2020 season was played with 17 home-and-away matches per team (down from 22) and 16-minute quarters with time on (down from 20-minute quarters with time on) due to the impact of the COVID-19 pandemic.)	Gold Coast	3	17	1	0	195	95	290	69	30	0.1	0.0	11.5	5.6	17.1	4.1	1.8	0
2021	Gold Coast	3	19	1	2	307	97	404	97	38	0.1	0.1	16.2	5.1	21.3	5.1	2.0	0
2022	Gold Coast	3	5	0	0	58	20	78	18	7	0.0	0.0	11.6	4.0	15.6	3.6	1.4	0
2023	Geelong	12	17	4	6	156	105	261	66	40	0.2	0.4	9.2	6.2	15.4	3.9	2.4	0
2024	Geelong	12	22	12	8	254	150	404	69	104	0.5	0.4	11.5	6.8	18.4	3.1	4.7	4
2025	Geelong	12	21	16	5	187	111	298	54	59	0.8	0.2	8.9	5.3	14.2	2.6	2.8	0
2026	Geelong	12	9	7	6	91	67	158	33	22	0.8	0.7	10.1	7.4	17.6	3.7	2.4	0
Career			152	53	37	1637	928	2565	558	417	0.3	0.2	10.8	6.1	16.9	3.7	2.7	4
