= Sam Marshall (footballer) =

Australian rules footballer (born 2006)

Personal information
- Full name: Sam Marshall
- Born: 19 January 2006 (age 20); Sunshine Coast, Queensland
- Original team: Sandringham Dragons (Talent League)
- Draft: No. 25, 2024 national draft
- Debut: Round 6, 2025, Brisbane Lions vs. Collingwood, at The Gabba
- Height: 187 cm (6 ft 2 in)
- Position: Midfielder

Club information
- Current club: St Kilda

Playing career^{1}
| Years | Club | Games (Goals) |
| 2025–2026 | Brisbane Lions | 13 (1) |
| 2027– | St Kilda | 0 (0) |
| Total | | 13 (1) |
- ^{1} Playing statistics correct to the end of 2026.

Career highlights
- AFL premiership player: 2025

Sam Marshall (born 19 January 2006) is an Australian rules footballer playing for the St Kilda Football Club in the Australian Football League (AFL). He previously played for the Brisbane Lions from 2025 to 2026. Marshall won a premiership with the Lions in 2025.

== Early life and junior football ==
Marshall was born in Buderim, Queensland and raised in the Sunshine Coast region. He first played football for the Kawana Park Eagles in the local Sunshine Coast AFL junior league. Marshall was an all-round sportman in his younger years and excelled in athletics, cross country, tennis, basketball, and surf lifesaving, but Australian rules football was his highest priority and he received a sports scholarship to attend the prestigious Brisbane Boys' College following selection in the Queensland schoolboys state team that competed in the 2018 under-12 national championships and was subsequently invited to participate in the Brisbane Lions academy program at 12 years of age.

At 15 years old, he received a football scholarship to attend Melbourne Grammar School and relocated to Victoria to begin boarding, where he played representative football with Sandringham Dragons in the Talent League. He was named best afield in the Dragons' 2024 premiership, recording 28 disposals and two goals in the win. He represented Allies at the 2024 AFL Under 18 Championships, averaging 27 disposals and subsequently being named in the tournament's All-Australian team.

== AFL career ==
Marshall was drafted by Brisbane with the club's second selection and the 25th pick overall in the 2024 AFL draft. As a member of the Lions Academy zone he was secured by the club under rules that allowed them to match a bid placed by Sydney.

Marshall made his debut in round 6 of the 2025 season in a loss to Collingwood at the Gabba. He became a premiership player that season in the Lions' 2025 Grand Final win over Geelong, in what was his 11th AFL match at the age of 19.

After being left out of the Brisbane side that won the 2026 AFL Grand Final, Marshall sought and received a trade to St Kilda to pursue more senior opportunities.

== Statistics ==
Updated to the end of round 20, 2026.

Legend
| G | Goals | K | Kicks | D | Disposals | T | Tackles |
| B | Behinds | H | Handballs | M | Marks |
| # | Played in that season's premiership team |

| Season | Team | No. | Games | Totals | | | | | | | Averages (per game) | | | | | | | Votes |
| Season | Team | No. | Games | G | B | K | H | D | M | T | G | B | K | H | D | M | T | Votes |
|---|---|---|---|---|---|---|---|---|---|---|---|---|---|---|---|---|---|---|
| 2025^{#} | Brisbane Lions | 20 | 11 | 1 | 1 | 64 | 59 | 123 | 27 | 15 | 0.1 | 0.1 | 5.8 | 5.4 | 11.2 | 2.5 | 1.4 | 0 |
| 2026 | Brisbane Lions | 20 | 2 | 0 | 0 | 13 | 20 | 33 | 6 | 4 | 0.0 | 0.0 | 6.5 | 10.0 | 16.5 | 3.0 | 2.0 | |
| Career | | | 13 | 1 | 1 | 77 | 79 | 156 | 33 | 19 | 0.1 | 0.1 | 5.9 | 6.1 | 12.0 | 2.5 | 1.5 | 0 |
