= Shannon Neale =

Australian rules footballer (born 2002)

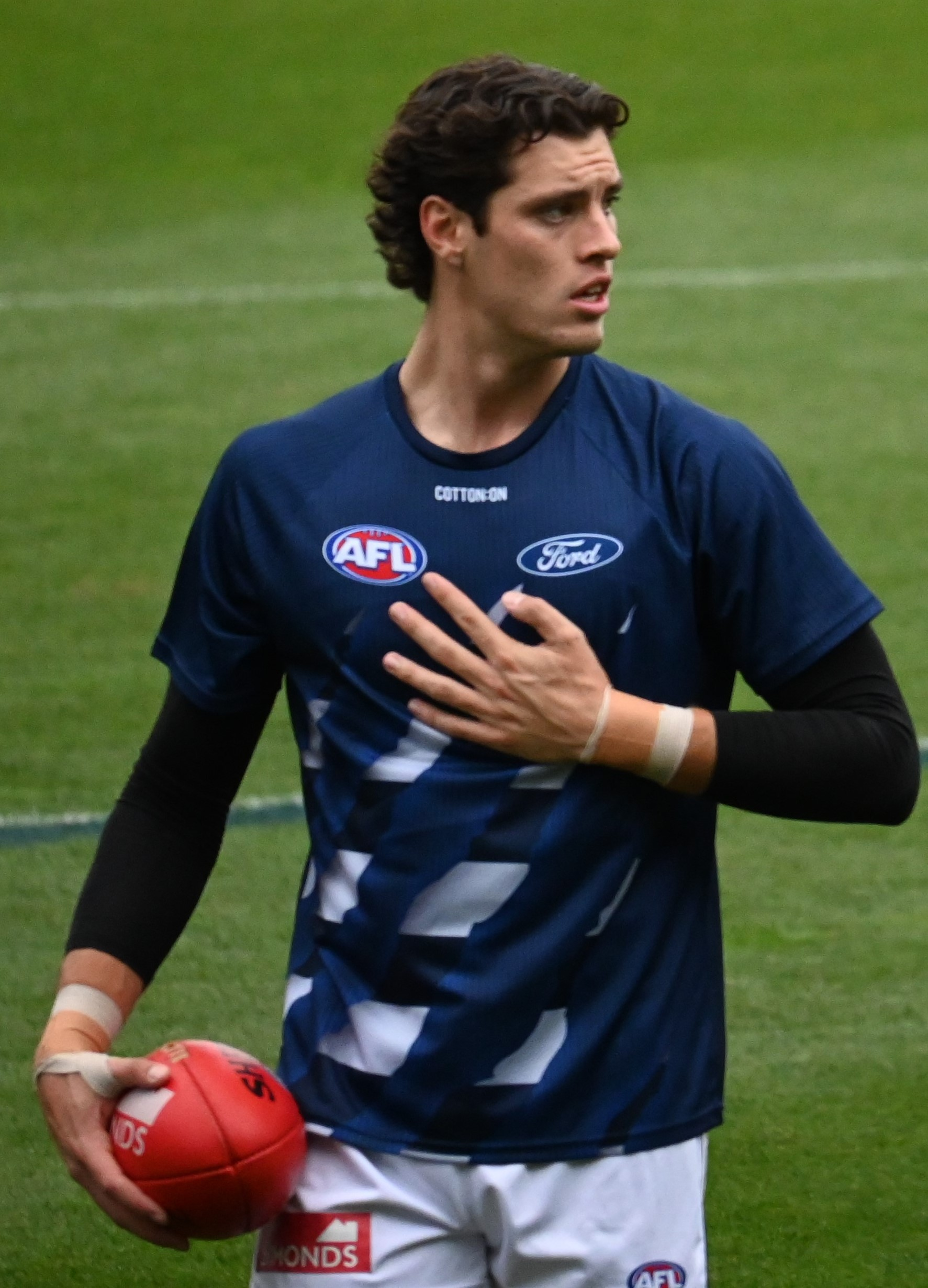
- Neale in 2024

Personal information
- Full name: Shannon Neale
- Nicknames: Shazza, Scratcher
- Born: 25 July 2002 (age 24)
- Original team: South Fremantle / Jandakot Jets
- Draft: No. 33, 2020 national draft
- Debut: Round 11, 2022, Geelong vs. Adelaide
- Height: 203 cm (6 ft 8 in)
- Weight: 107 kg (236 lb)
- Position: Forward / Ruck

Club information
- Current club: Geelong
- Number: 33

Playing career^{1}
Years	Club	Games (Goals)
2022–	Geelong	70 (120)
- ^{1} Playing statistics correct to the end of 2026.

Career highlights
- Geelong leading goalkicker: 2026

Shannon Neale (born 25 July 2002) is an Australian rules footballer who plays for Geelong in the Australian Football League (AFL).

Geelong selected with pick 33 in the 2020 AFL draft. Neale made his AFL debut in round 11 of the 2022 AFL season against the Adelaide Crows.

== Junior career ==
Shannon Neale was educated at Leeming High School and played his juniors at the Jandakot Jets.

In 2019, he won South Fremantle's Rising Star Award and South Fremantle's Leading Goalkicker Award. Prior to committing to football with South Fremantle, Neale was a National 400m and 800m runner. Since, he has represented Western Australia at the 2019 Under 16 National Championships, played in the Under 17 Futures All-Star showcase, and ran out for this year's Western Australia Under 18 All-Star clashes.

As described by Lenny Fogliani, “Neale is a ruckman/key forward with potential, attributed to his athleticism.”

== AFL career ==
Neale made his AFL debut in round 11 of the 2022 AFL season against the Adelaide Crows. Neale continued his rise throughout the 2023 AFL season, playing 3 games and kicking 1 goal.

== Statistics ==
Updated to the end of round 22, 2026.

Legend
G	Goals	K	Kicks	D	Disposals	T	Tackles
B	Behinds	H	Handballs	M	Marks	H/O	Hit-outs

Season	Team	No.	Games	Totals								Averages (per game)								Votes
Season	Team	No.	Games	G	B	K	H	D	M	T	H/O	G	B	K	H	D	M	T	H/O	Votes
2021	Geelong	33	0	—	—	—	—	—	—	—	—	—	—	—	—	—	—	—	—	0
2022	Geelong	33	2	0	0	4	9	13	3	4	14	0.0	0.0	2.0	4.5	6.5	1.5	2.0	7.0	0
2023	Geelong	33	3	1	2	9	12	21	12	9	19	0.3	0.7	3.0	4.0	7.0	4.0	3.0	6.3	0
2024	Geelong	33	15	23	11	88	48	136	61	31	54	1.5	0.7	5.9	3.2	9.1	4.1	2.1	3.6	0
2025	Geelong	33	25	44	18	129	80	209	99	69	108	1.8	0.7	5.2	3.2	8.4	4.0	2.8	4.3	2
2026	Geelong	33	21	41	22	135	89	224	92	56	106	2.0	1.0	6.4	4.2	10.7	4.4	2.7	5.0	5
Career			66	109	53	365	238	603	267	169	301	1.7	0.8	5.5	3.6	9.1	4.0	2.6	4.6	7

== Honours and achievements ==
Team

- AFL minor premiership (Geelong): 2022
