= Lachie Neale =

Australian rules footballer (born 1993)

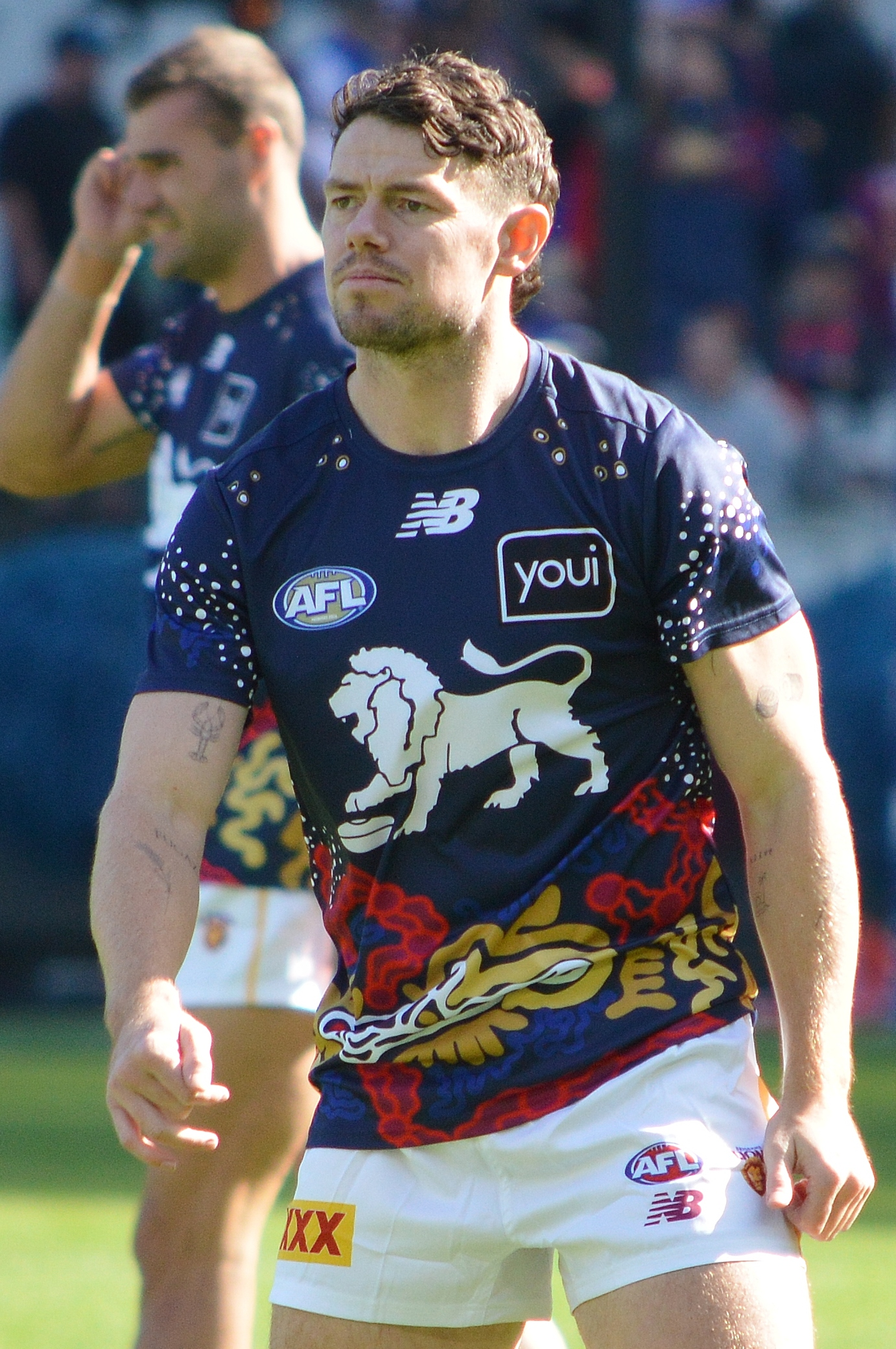
- Neale in April 2025

Personal information
- Full name: Lachlan Oliver Neale
- Born: 24 May 1993 (age 33); Naracoorte, South Australia
- Original team: Glenelg (SANFL) / Kybybolite (KNTFL)
- Draft: No. 58, 2011 national draft
- Height: 177 cm (5 ft 10 in)
- Weight: 85 kg (187 lb)
- Position: Midfielder

Club information
- Current club: Collingwood

Playing career
Years	Club	Games (Goals)
2012–2018	Fremantle	135 (67)
2019–2026	Brisbane Lions	186 (74)
2027–	Collingwood	0 (0)
Total		321 (141)

Representative team honours
Years	Team	Games (Goals)
2020	All Stars	1 (1)

Career highlights
- 3× AFL premiership player: 2024 (c), 2025 (c), 2026; 2× Brownlow Medal: 2020, 2023; Brisbane Lions co-captain: 2023–2025; Leigh Matthews Trophy: 2020; AFLCA Champion Player of the Year: 2020; 4× All-Australian team: 2019, 2020, 2022, 2024; Gary Ayres Award: 2024; 2× Doig Medal: 2016, 2018; 4× Merrett–Murray Medal: 2019, 2020, 2022, 2024; Lou Richards Medal: 2020; 2× Herald Sun Player of the Year: 2020, 2022; 22under22 team: 2015; 3× Ross Glendinning Medal: 2014, 2015, 2018; 2× Marcus Ashcroft Medal: 2020, 2023; 2× Geoff Christian Medal: 2016, 2018; Signature

Lachlan Oliver Neale (born 24 May 1993) is an Australian rules footballer playing for the Collingwood Football Club in the Australian Football League (AFL). He previously played for the Fremantle Football Club from 2012 to 2018 and the Brisbane Lions from 2019 to 2026. Neale was co-captain at Brisbane from 2023 to 2025, captaining the side alongside Harris Andrews to premierships in 2024, 2025 and a runner-up finish in 2023; after stepping down as captain with the Lions, Neale won a third consecutive premiership in 2026. He is a dual Brownlow Medallist, winning the award in 2020 and 2023.

== Early life ==
Neale was born in Naracoorte, South Australia. His family briefly lived on a farm in Langkoop, near Apsley, a small town just east of the South Australian border in western Victoria, before settling in the South Australian town of Kybybolite when Neale was still young.

Nicknamed "Cowboy" after Kevin Neale, he played various junior sports in Naracoorte, including basketball, soccer, cricket and football. Neale started playing football for Kybybolite in 2004 as a 10-year-old. He kicked 8 goals for the year as his team won the under-14 KNTFL premiership alongside future AFL player Jack Trengove. Neale also won another under-14 premiership the next season, once again alongside Trengove but also with future AFL teammate Alex Forster. Neale kicked 14 goals for the season but was not selected for the Grand Final. Neale continued playing for Kybybolite and then received a scholarship to attend St Peter's College, Adelaide. He won the Opie Medal in his final year at St Peter's.

He played his junior football for the Kybybolite Football Club and then the Glenelg Football Club in the South Australian National Football League (SANFL), including seven games in the league side, before returning to the under-18 team for the grand final. Despite Glenelg losing to Port Adelaide, he gathered 40 possessions and was awarded the Alan Stewart Medal as the best player in the game. He represented South Australia at the 2011 AFL Under-18 Championships.

Growing up, Neale supported the Port Adelaide Football Club.

== AFL career ==
=== Fremantle (2012–2018) ===
Neale was drafted to Fremantle with their fourth selection (number 58 overall) in the 2011 AFL draft. Neale's close friend and former teammate from Kybybolite Junior Football Club, Alex Forster, was also drafted by Fremantle with their previous selection in the same draft. They joined former Melbourne co-captain and Port Adelaide player Jack Trengove as ex-Kybybolite players on AFL lists.

Neale played very well during the 2012 NAB Cup preseason games and was predicted to make his AFL debut in the opening round of the 2012 AFL season, but hurt his ankle against Port Adelaide at Victor Harbor, South Australia.

Neale credits coach Ross Lyon's direction in his first year, with Lyon claiming Neale did not have long-term AFL potential unless he reduced his weight and improved his work rate, motivating Neale to heed Lyon’s advice.

After playing two games for Swan Districts in the West Australian Football League (WAFL), Neale made his debut in round 4 of the 2012 AFL season against St Kilda at Etihad Stadium as the substitute. He was activated during the third quarter, replacing Nick Suban. After his debut, Neale played through until round 14. He played one further game in round 20. Across the season, he averaged 11.3 disposals, 1.6 marks and 2.1 tackles per game.

In 2013 he improved, averaging 19.8 disposals, 3.3 marks and 1.7 tackles per game. Neale was the substitute in the 2013 AFL Grand Final when Fremantle lost to Hawthorn by 15 points.

Neale's 2016 season was rewarded with the Doig Medal as the club best and fairest.

At the conclusion of the 2018 season, after winning a second Doig Medal, Neale requested a trade to Brisbane. He was traded on 17 October.

Neale did not cite any reasons for leaving Fremantle; however, Lyon claims that he was motivated by money and that Fremantle was not able to match a lucrative offer made by Brisbane.

=== Brisbane Lions (2019–2026) ===
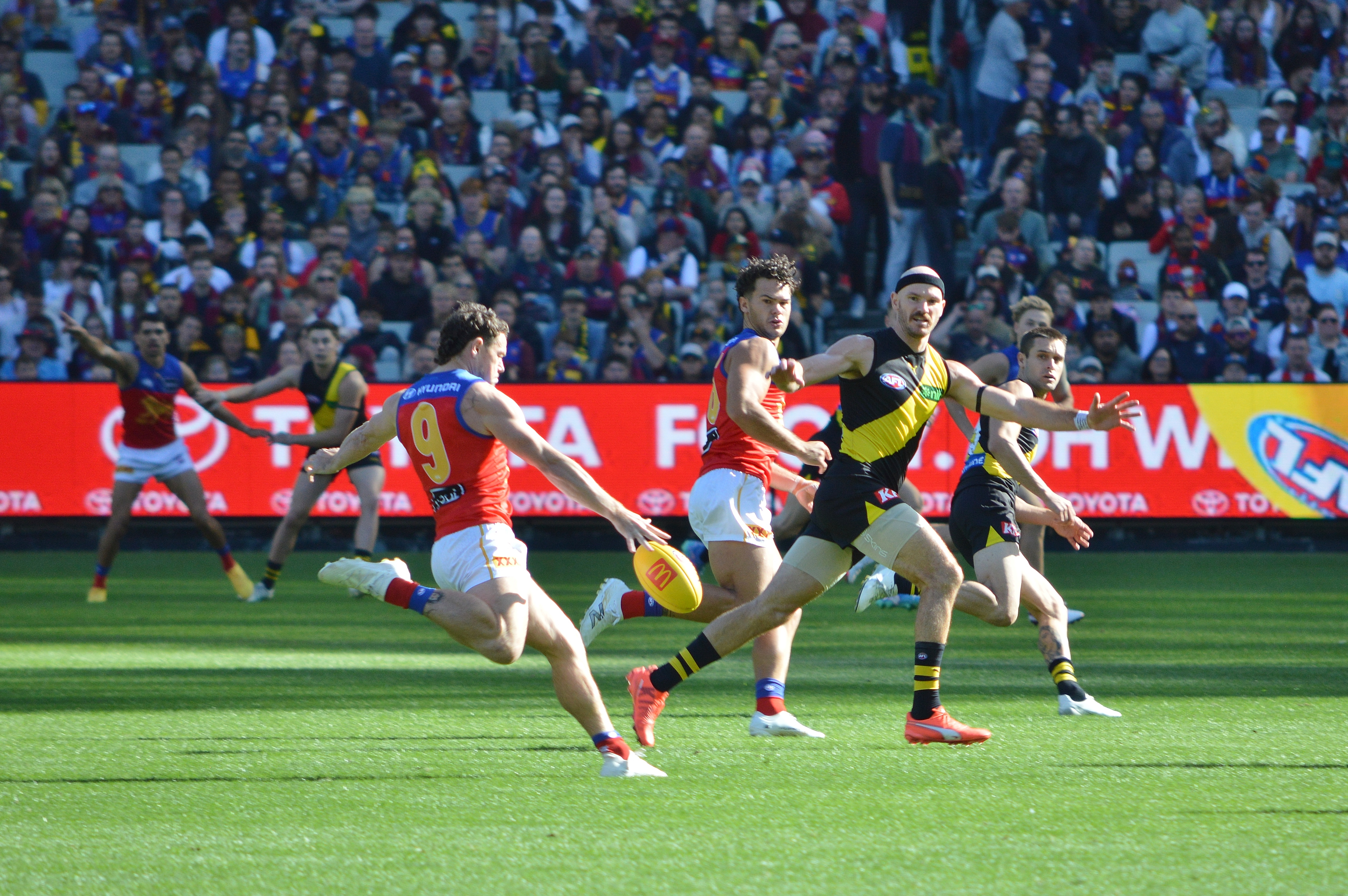
Neale kicks from the centre square in an April 2025 match against Richmond

Neale thrived at his new club in 2019, winning All-Australian team selection for the first time, winning his first Merrett–Murray Medal and finishing equal-third in the Brownlow Medal with 26 votes.

Neale had an excellent start to the 2020 season, with him being deemed the best player in the league by the ABC's Dean Bilton prior to round 6. Neale won the 2020 Brownlow Medal after polling 31 votes during the shortened regular season, including being best-on-ground in ten matches. This result put Neale in front of 2nd-placed Travis Boak by 10 votes, who had the equal-highest win in Brownlow Medal history since the introduction of the 3–2–1 voting system until Patrick Cripps. Neale's 2020 season success was also compounded by All-Australian selection, a Merrett–Murray Medal and the Leigh Matthews Trophy, amongst various other awards.

Neale's 2022 season was yet another season of success, taking home a third All-Australian blazer and winning a third Merrett–Murray Medal, as well as placing second in the Brownlow Medal, missing out on first place by a single vote.

==== Captaincy and premierships ====
On 1 March 2023, Neale was named co-captain of the Lions alongside Harris Andrews. Later in the year, Neale clinched his second Brownlow Medal after again polling 31 votes.

Neale experienced another outstanding season in 2024, winning All Australian selection honours for a 4th time in his career, and winning his 4th Merrett-Murray Medal. Neale was co-captain of the Brisbane Lions 2024 premiership winning team. He had 35 disposals and 9 clearances in the Grand Final, to finish second in the Norm Smith Medal voting. After standout performances throughout the 2024 finals series, Neale received the Gary Ayres Award for best finals player voted by the coaches.

As the Lions sought back-to-back premierships in 2025, Neale was injured with what was originally diagnosed as a season-ending calf injury in the qualifying final, before returning as the substitute in the 2025 grand final and helping his side with a crucial second half goal and a second successive premiership.

==== 2026 ====
On 2 January 2026, Neale stood down as co-captain of the Lions, in addition to the leadership group as a whole, amidst his marriage breakdown.

Neale's contract with Brisbane finished at the end of 2026, and during the season there was ongoing media speculation of whether he would stay with Brisbane, seek a contract in Perth closer to his children, or in Victoria nearer his parents. Neale acknowledged that it was a difficult situation and commented that "It’s nice to be 33 and feel a little bit wanted", and "I’ve just got to weigh everything - success, finance, everything that goes along with playing footy".

On 8 May 2026, Neale won the Robert Walls Medal for best on ground in a win against Carlton, recording 33 disposals and 9 clearances, including the match-sealing goal.

During Brisbane's 2026 finals campaign, the Lions defeated Hawthorn in the preliminary final to progress to a fourth consecutive grand final, presenting the opportunity for Neale to win a third successive premiership. However, the following day the AFL announced that Neale had received a one-match suspension from the match review officer for striking Jack Ginnivan. Neale's suspension dominated the media cycle in the leadup to the 2026 grand final, and the Lions unsuccessfully appealed the ban at the Tribunal on the Tuesday leading up to the match. However, on the Thursday before the grand final, the Lions challenged the tribunal's decision at the Appeal's Board, who overturned the suspension, ruling that the tribunal failed to give sufficient weight to Neale's exemplary record of 320 games without suspension, and determining that this was enough to trigger the clause relating to exceptional and compelling circumstances in the league's regulations; Neale's suspension was downgraded to a $10,000 fine.

Following his successful appeal, Neale won a third consecutive premiership, defeating former club Fremantle in the 2026 Grand Final. In a post-match interview, Neale confirmed that he would depart Brisbane ahead of the 2027 season; he is expected to join Collingwood.

=== Collingwood (2026–) ===
In October 2026, Collingwood confirmed that they had signed Neale as an unrestricted free agent, with the Brisbane Lions receiving a Band 3 Compensation Pick (No.39 at time of announcement). Neale signed a 3-year deal worth at least $900,000 per season.

== Personal life ==
Neale married his partner Jules, an owner of a Perth-based beauty salon store, in late 2018. The pair moved to Brisbane for his football career and welcomed their first child, a girl, in September 2021 and their second child, a boy, in December 2024.

In late 2025 several media reports indicated Neale's marriage had broken down, and in January 2026, Neale confirmed he and his wife had separated and that he had stood down as co-captain of Brisbane. At a press conference, Neale stated "while I won’t go into specifics, I can say that I’ve let my family down, and I apologise for my actions which have hurt those closest to me, and for that, I am deeply sorry." His ex-wife, Jules, moved back to Perth with their children and later alleged that he'd had multiple affairs, including one with her best friend.

== Statistics ==
Legend
G	Goals	K	Kicks	D	Disposals	T	Tackles
B	Behinds	H	Handballs	M	Marks
#	Played in that season's premiership team	†	Led the league for the season	±	Won that season's Brownlow Medal

Season	Team	No.	Games	Totals							Averages (per game)							Votes
Season	Team	No.	Games	G	B	K	H	D	M	T	G	B	K	H	D	M	T	Votes
2012	Fremantle	27	11	4	2	51	73	124	18	23	0.4	0.2	4.6	6.6	11.3	1.6	2.1	0
2013	Fremantle	27	12	8	4	111	126	237	40	20	0.7	0.3	9.3	10.5	19.8	3.3	1.7	1
2014	Fremantle	27	23	8	10	242	298	540	91	76	0.3	0.4	10.5	13.0	23.5	4.0	3.3	7
2015	Fremantle	27	24	16	10	320	338	658	114	86	0.7	0.4	13.3	14.1	27.4	4.8	3.6	10
2016	Fremantle	27	22	7	4	289	448	737	90	101	0.3	0.2	13.1	20.4	33.5	4.1	4.6	20
2017	Fremantle	27	21	14	6	244	327	571	94	94	0.7	0.3	11.6	15.6	27.2	4.5	4.5	14
2018	Fremantle	27	22	10	6	251	416	667	79	93	0.5	0.3	11.4	18.9	30.3	3.6	4.2	11
2019	Brisbane Lions	9	24	12	7	301	441	742	98	90	0.5	0.3	12.5	18.4	30.9	4.1	3.8	26
2020 (Note: The 2020 season was played with 17 home-and-away matches per team (down from 22) and 16-minute quarters with time on (down from 20-minute quarters with time on) due to the impact of the COVID-19 pandemic.)	Brisbane Lions	9	19	14	13	249	262	511^{†}	79	59	0.7	0.7	13.1	13.8	26.9	4.2	3.1	31^{±}
2021	Brisbane Lions	9	17	8	6	220	239	459	66	70	0.5	0.4	12.9	14.1	27.0	3.9	4.1	8
2022	Brisbane Lions	9	25	11	8	346	403	749	96	113	0.4	0.3	13.8	16.1	30.0	3.8	4.5	28
2023	Brisbane Lions	9	26	3	11	311	383	694	109	106	0.1	0.4	12.0	14.7	26.7	4.2	4.1	31^{±}
2024^{#}	Brisbane Lions	9	26	13	7	353	409	762	120	86	0.5	0.3	13.6	15.7	29.3	4.6	3.3	22
2025^{#}	Brisbane Lions	9	22	8	4	288	302	590	90	81	0.4	0.2	13.1	13.7	26.8	4.1	3.7	16
2026^{#}	Brisbane Lions	9	27	5	10	357	418	775	143	71	0.2	0.4	13.2	15.5	28.7	5.3	2.6	20
Career			321	141	108	3933	4883	8816	1327	1169	0.4	0.3	12.3	15.2	27.5	4.1	3.6	245

== Honours and achievements ==
Team

- 3× AFL Premiership Player (Brisbane Lions): 2024 (c), 2025 (c), 2026
- 2× McClelland Trophy/AFL minor premiership (Fremantle): 2015, Club Championship (Brisbane): 2025

Individual

- 2× Brownlow Medal: 2020, 2023
- Leigh Matthews Trophy: 2020
- AFLCA Champion Player of the Year Award: 2020
- 4× All-Australian team: 2019, 2020, 2022, 2024
- Gary Ayres Award: 2024
- 2× Doig Medal: 2016, 2018
- 4× Merrett–Murray Medal: 2019, 2020, 2022, 2024
- Lou Richards Medal: 2020
- 2× Herald Sun Player of the Year: 2020, 2022
- 22under22 team: 2015
- 3× Glendinning–Allan Medal: 2014, 2015, 2018
- 2× Marcus Ashcroft Medal: 2020, 2023
- 2× Geoff Christian Medal: 2016, 2018
