= Andrew Stephens =

Australian rules football umpire

Personal information
- Full name: Andrew Stephens
- Nickname: Stevo
- Height: 180 cm (5 ft 11 in)
- Weight: 72 kg (159 lb)
- Other occupation: Civil engineer

Umpiring career
Years	League	Role	Games
2012–	AFL	Field umpire	231

Andrew Stephens is an Australian rules football umpire currently officiating in the Australian Football League.

He first umpired in the AFL Brisbane Juniors as a teenager. He went on to umpire in the North East Australian Football League, officiating in the 2011, 2012, and 2013 grand finals. He was on the AFL umpiring rookie list for 2012 and 2013, and was added to the senior list in 2014. He made his AFL umpiring debut in round 5 of that year, in a match between the Brisbane Lions and Richmond.

Stephens was appointed to his first AFL Grand Final in 2025, having been the emergency field umpire in the previous two grand finals. He holds a curious milestone in umpiring history as the last ever umpire to perform a centre bounce in a VFL/AFL premiership match, taking the final bounce of the 2025 grand final before all bounces were replaced with throws in 2026.
