= 2018 Brisbane Lions season =

Brisbane Lions
2018 season
- President: Andrew Wellington
- Coach: Chris Fagan (AFL); Craig Starcevich (AFLW)
- Captains: Dayne Beams (AFL, until May 23); Dayne Zorko (AFL, from May 23); Emma Zielke (AFLW)
- Home ground: The Gabba (AFL) (Capacity: 42,000); South Pine Sports Complex (AFLW) (Capacity: 3,000)
- AFL season: 15th
- Finals series: Did not qualify
- Leading goalkicker: Eric Hipwood (37 goals)
- Highest home attendance: 21,850 vs. Collingwood (May 7, 2018)
- Lowest home attendance: 11,267 vs. Greater Western Sydney (June 23, 2018)
- Average home attendance: 18,406
- Club membership: 23,275

The 2018 Brisbane Lions season was the Brisbane Lions' 22nd season in the AFL. It was also their 2nd season in the AFL Women's and they fielded a reserves team in the NEAFL.

== AFL ==
=== List changes ===
At the end of the 2017 season, the Lions announced that they were delisting five players from their squad: Ryan Harwood, Jarrad Jansen, Josh Clayton, Jonathan Freeman and Blake Grewar. They had all played in the Lions' 2017 NEAFL Grand Final win. After 154 games at the club, former captain Tom Rockliff accepted an offer to go to Port Adelaide as a restricted free agent and Brisbane decided not to match Port Adelaide's offer. They received a draft pick at the end of the first round (pick 18) as compensation.

On the last day of the 2017 trade period, Brisbane made three trades. Four-time premiership player and former captain of Hawthorn Luke Hodge decided to come out of retirement and was traded to the Lions. Queenslander Charlie Cameron also requested a trade to the club and the Lions gave up pick 12 to secure him. Young key forward Josh Schache, who Brisbane had drafted with pick 2 in the 2015 national draft, requested a trade back to Victoria. He was traded to the Western Bulldogs in exchange for two draft picks in the 2017 draft.

==== Retirements and delistings ====
**Player**	**Date**	**Reason**	**Career games**	**Career goals**	**Ref.**
Ryan Harwood	12 September 2017	Delisted	81	6	
Jarrad Jansen	12 September 2017	Delisted	8	4	
Josh Clayton	12 September 2017	Delisted	2	0	
Jonathan Freeman	12 September 2017	Delisted	14	16	
Blake Grewar	12 September 2017	Delisted	0	0	

==== Trades ====
**Date**	**Gained**	**From**	**Lost**	**Ref.**
19 October 2017	Luke Hodge; Pick 44	Hawthorn	Pick 43; Pick 75	
19 October 2017	Charlie Cameron	Adelaide	Pick 12	
19 October 2017	Pick 25; Pick 40	Western Bulldogs	Josh Schache	

==== Free agency ====
===== Out =====
**Player**	**Date**	**Type**	**New club**	**Compensation**	**Ref.**
Tom Rockliff	11 October 2017	Restricted	Port Adelaide	End of first round	

=== Squad ===
Brisbane Lions · AFL personnel
Senior list		Rookie list	Coaching staff
1 Kai Lohmann; 2 Sam Draper; 3 Jaspa Fletcher; 4 Oscar Allen; 5 Josh Dunkley (vc); 6 Hugh McCluggage (vc); 7 Jarrod Berry; 8 Will Ashcroft; 9 Lachie Neale; 10 Levi Ashcroft; 12 Tom Doedee; 13 Logan Morris; 14 Daniel Annable; 15 Dayne Zorko; 16 Cameron Rayner; 18 Keidean Coleman; 19 Luke Lloyd; 20 Sam Marshall; 21 Zane Zakostelsky	22 Ty Gallop; 23 Charlie Cameron; 24 Koby Evans; 25 Henry Smith; 26 Conor McKenna; 27 Darcy Gardiner; 29 James Tunstill; 30 Eric Hipwood; 31 Harris Andrews (c); 32 Darcy Fort; 33 Zac Bailey; 34 Shadeau Brain; 35 Ryan Lester; 36 Reece Torrent; 37 Cody Curtin; 40 Jack Payne; 42 Tai Hayes; 43 Noah Answerth; 44 Darcy Wilmot	11 Lincoln McCarthy; 17 Luke Beecken; 28 Will McLachlan; 38 Bruce Reville; 39 Ben Murphy (B); 41 Darragh Joyce	**Head coach**: Chris Fagan; **Assistant coaches**: Dale Morris (back line); Cameron Bruce (midfield); Daniel Lloyd (forward line); Scott Borlace (head of development); Scott Thompson (development); Liam Jones (development); Legend: (c) Captain(s); (vc) Vice-captain(s); italics – Inactive; Long-term injury; (B) Category B rookie; Updated: 25 February 2026; Source(s): Players, coaches

=== Ladder ===
Pos	Team	Pld	W	L	D	PF	PA	PP	Pts	Qualification
1	Richmond	22	18	4	0	2143	1574	136.1	72	2018 finals
2	West Coast (P)	22	16	6	0	2012	1657	121.4	64	2018 finals
3	Collingwood	22	15	7	0	2046	1699	120.4	60	2018 finals
4	Hawthorn	22	15	7	0	1972	1642	120.1	60	2018 finals
5	Melbourne	22	14	8	0	2299	1749	131.4	56	2018 finals
6	Sydney	22	14	8	0	1822	1664	109.5	56	2018 finals
7	Greater Western Sydney	22	13	8	1	1898	1661	114.3	54	2018 finals
8	Geelong	22	13	9	0	2045	1554	131.6	52	2018 finals
9	North Melbourne	22	12	10	0	1950	1790	108.9	48	
10	Port Adelaide	22	12	10	0	1780	1654	107.6	48	
11	Essendon	22	12	10	0	1932	1838	105.1	48	
12	Adelaide	22	12	10	0	1941	1865	104.1	48	
13	Western Bulldogs	22	8	14	0	1575	2037	77.3	32	
14	Fremantle	22	8	14	0	1556	2041	76.2	32	
**15**	Brisbane Lions	**22**	**5**	**17**	**0**	**1825**	**2049**	**89.1**	20	
16	St Kilda	22	4	17	1	1606	2125	75.6	18	
17	Gold Coast	22	4	18	0	1308	2182	59.9	16	
18	Carlton	22	2	20	0	1353	2282	59.3	8	

Source: AFL
Rules for classification: 1) points; 2) percentage; 3) number of points for.
(P) Premiers

=== Season summary ===
==== AFLX Competition ====
Team	Pld	W	L	D	PF	PA	PD	Pts
Brisbane Lions	2	2	0	0	130	119	11	**8**
Richmond	2	1	1	0	110	100	10	**4**
Greater Western Sydney	2	0	2	0	92	113	-21	**0**

	Pool A
17 February (5:06 pm)	Richmond 4.3.3 (61)	def. by	**Brisbane Lions 4.4.7 (66)**	Allianz Stadium, Sydney	Report
17 February (6:02 pm)	**Brisbane Lions 3.5.4 (64)**	def.	Greater Western Sydney 2.6.2 (58)	Allianz Stadium, Sydney	Report

	Grand Final
17 February (7:03 pm)	**Brisbane Lions 5.2.5 (67)**	def.	Sydney 2.3.3 (41)	Allianz Stadium, Sydney (crowd: 9,892)	Report

==== Pre-season ====
**Rd**	**Date and local time**	**Opponent**	**Scores** (Brisbane's scores indicated in **bold**)			**Venue**	**Attendance**
**Rd**	**Date and local time**	**Opponent**	Home	Away	Result	**Venue**	**Attendance**
1	Saturday, 3 March (3:35 pm)	Sydney	**5.10 (40)**	14.11 (95)	Lost by 55 points	Moreton Bay Central Sports Complex (H)	1,901
2	Sunday, 11 March (3:35 pm)	Gold Coast	7.7 (49)	**4.18 (42)**	Lost by 7 points	Fankhauser Reserve (A)	1,649

Match 8
Saturday, 3 March (3:35 pm)	Brisbane Lions	def. by	**Sydney**	Moreton Bay Sports Complex, Burpengary (crowd: 1,901)	Report
2.5 (17); 2.5 (17); 2.8 (20); 5.10 (40)	**Q1; Q2; Q3; Final**	3.1 (19); 6.6 (42); 9.7 (61); 14.11 (95)	Umpires: Hosking, Ryan, Schmitt, Glouftsis; Television broadcast: Fox Footy
Keays, Hipwood **2** Christensen **1**	**Goals**	**4** Franklin; **3** Papley, Rose; **2** Reid; **1** Hewett, Parker
Martin, Bell, Taylor, Mathieson	**Best**	Franklin, Rampe, Fox, Mills, Kennedy, Papley, Rose
Nil	**Injuries**	Naismith replaced in selected side by Cameron; Aliir (ankle), Sinclair (ankle)
Nil	**Reports**	Nil

Match 17
Sunday, 11 March (3:35 pm)	**Gold Coast**	def.	Brisbane Lions	Fankhauser Reserve, Southport (crowd: 1,649)	Report
2.1 (13); 4.6 (30); 5.7 (37); 7.7 (49)	**Q1; Q2; Q3; Final**	0.5 (5); 2.7 (19); 3.14 (32); 4.18 (42)	Television broadcast: Fox Footy
Lynch, Macpherson, Miller, Young, Sexton, Hall, Ainsworth **1**	**Goals**	**1** Taylor, Berry, Robertson, Zorko
Lyons, Witts, Weller, Hall, Swallow, Fiorini	**Best**	Zorko, Berry, Bell, Taylor, Rich, Hodge
Hanley (shoulder)	**Injuries**	Nil
Nil	**Reports**	Nil

==== Home and Away season ====
**Rd**	**Date and local time**	**Opponent**	**Scores** (Brisbane's scores indicated in **bold**)			**Venue**	**Attendance**	**Ladder** **position**
**Rd**	**Date and local time**	**Opponent**	Home	Away	Result	**Venue**	**Attendance**	**Ladder** **position**
1	Saturday, 24 March (3:35 pm)	St Kilda	16.11 (107)	**12.10 (82)**	Lost by 25 points	Etihad Stadium (A)	23,731	13th
2	Saturday, 31 March (6:25 pm)	Melbourne	**10.14 (74)**	14.16 (100)	Lost by 26 points	The Gabba (H)	17,141	15th
3	Saturday, 7 April (1:15 pm)	Port Adelaide	14.13 (97)	**14.8 (92)**	Lost by 5 points	Adelaide Oval (A)	36,363	17th
4	Saturday, 11 April (2:10 pm)	Richmond	16.14 (110)	**2.5 (17)**	Lost by 93 points	MCG (A)	32,870	17th
5	Sunday, 22 April (4:40 pm)	Gold Coast	**10.11 (71)**	11.10 (76)	Lost by 5 points	The Gabba (H)	16,087	17th
6	Saturday, 28 April (4:35 pm)	Greater Western Sydney	10.17 (77)	**5.13 (43)**	Lost by 34 points	Spotless Stadium (A)	10,046	17th
7	Sunday, 6 May (4:40 pm)	Collingwood	**18.6 (114)**	19.7 (121)	Lost by 7 points	The Gabba (H)	21,580	17th
8	Saturday, 12 May (7:25 pm)	Western Bulldogs	16.11 (107)	**14.9 (93)**	Lost by 14 points	Etihad Stadium (A)	20,865	18th
9	Sunday, 20 May (3:20 pm)	Hawthorn	**20.9 (129)**	11.7 (73)	Won by 56 points	The Gabba (H)	20,628	17th
10	Sunday, 26 May (4:35 pm)	Sydney	**6.13 (49)**	10.7 (67)	Lost by 18 points	The Gabba (H)	18,702	17th
11	Saturday, 3 June (1:10 pm)	North Melbourne	21.15 (141)	**12.15 (87)**	Lost by 54 points	Etihad Stadium (A)	22,133	17th
12	Sunday, 10 June (1:10 pm)	Essendon	**8.14 (62)**	12.12 (84)	Lost by 22 points	The Gabba (H)	20,476	17th
13	Bye							17th
14	Saturday, 23 June (4:35 pm)	Greater Western Sydney	**12.10 (82)**	16.13 (109)	Lost by 27 points	The Gabba (H)	11,267	17th
15	Sunday, 1 July (2:40 pm)	Fremantle	9.10 (64)	**18.11 (119)**	Won by 55 points	Optus Stadium (A)	41,674	17th
16	Saturday, 7 July (1:45 pm)	Carlton	**18.12 (120)**	7.13 (55)	Won by 65 points	The Gabba (H)	21,074	16th
17	Saturday, 14 July (1:45 pm)	Hawthorn	9.11 (65)	**15.8 (98)**	Won by 35 points	University of Tasmania Stadium (A)	12,557	16th
18	Saturday, 21 July (7:25 pm)	Adelaide	**13.10 (88)**	13.15 (93)	Lost by 5 points	The Gabba (H)	20,475	16th
19	Saturday, 28 July (2:10 pm)	Geelong	18.12 (120)	**11.12 (78)**	Lost by 42 points	GMHBA Stadium (A)	28,226	16th
20	Saturday, 4 August (2:10 pm)	North Melbourne	**16.8 (104)**	16.11 (107)	Lost by 3 points	The Gabba (H)	18,395	16th
21	Saturday, 11 August (7:25 pm)	Collingwood	14.20 (104)	**11.7 (73)**	Lost by 31 points	Etihad Stadium (A)	33,390	16th
22	Saturday, 18 August (7:25 pm)	Gold Coast	11.8 (74)	**10.18 (78)**	Won by 4 points	Metricon Stadium (A)	11,907	15th
23	Sunday, 26 August (1:10 pm)	West Coast	**11.6 (72)**	14.14 (98)	Lost by 26 points	The Gabba (H)	16,367	15th

===== Round 1 =====
Round 1
Saturday, 24 March (3:35 pm)	**St Kilda**	def.	Brisbane Lions	Etihad Stadium, Melbourne (crowd: 23,731)	Report
6.4 (40); 7.5 (47); 11.8 (74); 16.11 (107)	**Q1; Q2; Q3; Final**	3.3 (21); 5.8 (38); 9.10 (64); 12.10 (82)	Umpires: Donlon, Haussen, Stephens; Television broadcast: Fox Footy
Gresham, Bruce **3** Billings, Membrey, Steven **2** Acres, Clark, Long, McCartin **1**	**Goals**	**3** Cameron, Berry; **1** Bell, Rayner, Christensen, Hipwood, Robinson, Walker
Steven, Billings, Acres, Newnes, Ross, Stevens	**Best**	D. Beams, Cameron, Berry, Martin, Hodge, Robertson
Nil	**Injuries**	Rich (left ankle)
Nil	**Reports**	Nil

===== Round 2 =====
Round 2
Saturday, 31 March (6:25 pm)	Brisbane Lions	def. by	**Melbourne**	The Gabba, Brisbane (crowd: 17,141)	Report
0.3 (3); 2.6 (18); 5.11 (41); 10.14 (74)	**Q1; Q2; Q3; Final**	5.4 (34); 8.7 (55); 9.11 (65); 14.16 (100)	Umpires: Fisher, Rosebury, Hosking; Television broadcast: Fox Footy
Cameron, Christensen **3** Bewick, Zorko, Hipwood, Cox **1**	**Goals**	**5** Hogan; **4** Garlett; **2** Jones, Fritsch; **1** Neal-Bullen
Cameron, Christensen, Cox, Taylor, Zorko	**Best**	Hogan, Garlett, Oliver, Jones, Petracca
Nil	**Injuries**	Nil
Nil	**Reports**	Nil

===== Round 3 =====
Round 3
Saturday, 7 April (1:15 pm)	**Port Adelaide**	def.	Brisbane Lions	Adelaide Oval, Adelaide (crowd: 36,363)	Report
4.6 (30); 7.7 (49); 14.8 (92); 14.13 (97)	**Q1; Q2; Q3; Final**	4.0 (24); 9.6 (60); 11.8 (74); 14.8 (92)	Umpires: Meredith, Harris, Mitchell; Television broadcast: Fox Footy
S. Gray **3** Motlop **2** Dixon, R. Gray, Marshall, Wingard, Westhoff, Watts, Rockliff, Ebert, Boak **1**	**Goals**	**3** Cameron, Hipwood; **2** McCluggage; **1** Robertson, Christensen, Rayner, Zorko, Cutler, Cox
S. Gray, Polec, Wines, Hartlett, Ebert, Wingard	**Best**	Martin, Cutler, Zorko, Robinson, Hodge, Hipwood, Christensen
Wines (ankle)	**Injuries**	D Beams (illness) replaced in the selected side by Cutler
Nil	**Reports**	Nil

===== Round 4 =====
Round 4
Saturday, 11 April (2:10 pm)	**Richmond**	def.	Brisbane Lions	MCG, Melbourne (crowd: 32,870)	Report
5.5 (35); 8.10 (58); 11.12 (78); 16.14 (110)	**Q1; Q2; Q3; Final**	0.2 (2); 0.4 (4); 1.4 (10); 2.5 (17)	Umpires: Meredith, Harris, Wallace; Television broadcast: Fox Footy
D. Martin **6** Castagna, Townsend **3** Lambert **2** Riewoldt, Caddy **1**	**Goals**	**1** Zorko, Rayner
Cotchin, Lambert, Rance, D. Martin, Conca, Grigg, Riewoldt	**Best**	Zorko, Rayner, Robinson, S. Martin, Witherden
Nil	**Injuries**	Nil
Jack Graham (Richmond) for rough conduct against Dayne Zorko in the third quarter	**Reports**	Nil
The Brisbane Lions' score of 2.5 (17) is its lowest score in club history and the lowest score by a team in the AFL since Fremantle scored 1.7 (13) in round 15, 2009.

===== Round 5 =====
Round 5
Sunday, 22 April (4:40 pm)	Brisbane Lions	def. by	**Gold Coast**	The Gabba, Brisbane (crowd: 16,087)	Report
2.3 (15); 4.7 (31); 7.9 (51); 10.11 (71)	**Q1; Q2; Q3; Final**	4.2 (26); 7.3 (45); 10.6 (66); 11.10 (76)	Umpires: Fisher, Schmitt, Fleer; Marcus Ashcroft Medal: Touk Miller (Gold Coast); Television broadcast: Fox Footy
Hipwood **3** Cameron **2** Taylor, Bailey, Rayner, Zorko, McStay **1**	**Goals**	**2** Macpherson, Lynch, Fiorini; **1** Lyons, Young, Day, Holman, May
Berry, Witherden, Martin, McCluggage, Cameron, Andrews	**Best**	Miller, Fiorini, May, Swallow, Weller, Harbrow
Nil	**Injuries**	Macpherson (lower leg), May (dislocated finger)
Nil	**Reports**	Nil

===== Round 6 =====
Round 6
Saturday, 28 April (4:35 pm)	**Greater Western Sydney**	def.	Brisbane Lions	Spotless Stadium, Sydney (crowd: 10,046)	Report
3.4 (22); 6.9 (45); 8.11 (59); 10.17 (77)	**Q1; Q2; Q3; Final**	0.5 (5); 1.6 (12); 4.9 (33); 5.13 (43)	Umpires: O'Gorman, Hay, Mollison; Television broadcast: Fox Footy
Langdon, J. Cameron, Deledio, Lloyd, Tomlinson, de Boer, Himmelberg, Hopper, Whitfield, Griffen **1**	**Goals**	**1** D. Beams, McStay, Taylor, Hipwood, Zorko
de Boer, Whitfield, Taranto, Deledio, Shiel, Shaw	**Best**	D. Beams, Robinson, Rich, Gardiner, Martin
Corr (shoulder), Langdon (knee)	**Injuries**	Berry (ankle)
Nil	**Reports**	Robertson (Brisbane) for striking Himmelberg in the third quarter

===== Round 7 =====
Round 7
Sunday, 6 May (4:40 pm)	Brisbane Lions	def. by	**Collingwood**	The Gabba, Brisbane (crowd: 21,850)	Report
3.0 (18); 10.0 (60); 14.2 (86); 18.6 (114)	**Q1; Q2; Q3; Final**	4.2 (26); 10.3 (63); 15.4 (94); 19.7 (121)	Umpires: Rosebury, Whetton, Williamson; Television broadcast: Fox Footy
Zorko, Taylor **4** McStay, D. Beams **2** Robinson, McInerney, McCluggage, Berry, Cameron, Bailey **1**	**Goals**	**5** De Goey; **3** Thomas; **2** Stephenson; **1** Pendlebury, Mayne, Howe, Treloar, Moore, Phillips, Cox, Varcoe, Hoskin-Elliott
Zorko, Taylor, Rayner, D. Beams, Martin, Bailey	**Best**	De Goey, Thomas, Sidebottom, Phillips, Howe
Nil	**Injuries**	Pendlebury (ankle)
Nil	**Reports**	Nil

===== Round 8 =====
Round 8
Saturday, 12 May (7:25 pm)	**Western Bulldogs**	def.	Brisbane Lions	Etihad Stadium, Melbourne (crowd: 20,865)	Report
4.3 (27); 9.5 (59); 12.8 (80); 16.11 (107)	**Q1; Q2; Q3; Final**	4.1 (25); 6.5 (41); 8.8 (56); 14.9 (93)	Umpires: Fisher, Margetts, Whetton; Television broadcast: Fox Footy
Bontempelli **4** Gowers, Lipinski, McLean **2** Daniel, Boyd, Dale, Wallis, Dunkley, Suckling **1**	**Goals**	**4** Zorko; **3** Cameron; **2** McInerney, McStay; **1** Rayner, McCluggage, Hipwood
Macrae, McLean, Hunter, Bontempelli, Suckling	**Best**	Zorko, Martin, Cameron, Cutler, Robinson
Naughton (ankle)	**Injuries**	Nil
Nil	**Reports**	Nil

===== Round 9 =====
Round 9
Sunday, 20 May (3:20 pm)	**Brisbane Lions**	def.	Hawthorn	The Gabba, Brisbane (crowd: 20,628)	Report
4.1 (25); 9.1 (55); 13.6 (84); 20.9 (129)	**Q1; Q2; Q3; Final**	5.0 (30); 7.2 (44); 9.3 (57); 11.7 (73)	Umpires: Donlon, Deboy, Glouftsis; Television broadcast: Seven Network
Hipwood **4** Cutler **3** D. Beams, Cameron, Rayner **2** Robinson, Zorko, McInerney, Rich, Christensen, Eagles, Taylor **1**	**Goals**	**4** Gunston; **2** Roughead, Smith; **1** Mitchell, Sicily, Worpel
McCluggage, Hipwood, D. Beams, Cameron, Andrews, Zorko, Cutler	**Best**	Gunston, Mitchell, Impey, Shiels, McEvoy
Nil	**Injuries**	Cousins (head)
Nil	**Reports**	Nil

===== Round 10 =====
Round 10
Sunday, 26 May (4:35 pm)	Brisbane Lions	def. by	**Sydney**	The Gabba, Brisbane (crowd: 18,702)	Report
2.2 (14); 2.3 (15); 4.7 (31); 6.13 (49)	**Q1; Q2; Q3; Final**	3.0 (18); 5.3 (33); 8.6 (54); 10.7 (67)	Umpires: Ryan, Hosking, Gavine; Television broadcast: Fox Footy
Berry, D. Beams, Rayner, Zorko, Cutler, Christensen **1**	**Goals**	**2** Heeney, Hayward, Ronke; **1** Papley, Stoddart, Franklin, Jack
D. Beams, Gardiner, Robinson, Zorko, Martin, Cutler	**Best**	Kennedy, Jones, Lloyd, Heeney, McVeigh, Hewett
Eagles (abdominals)	**Injuries**	Nil
Nil	**Reports**	Nil
The win was Sydney's 11th straight win over the Lions, who have not beaten them since Round 22, 2009.

===== Round 11 =====
Round 11 (Sir Doug Nicholls Round)
Sunday, 3 June (1:10 pm)	**North Melbourne**	def.	Brisbane Lions	Etihad Stadium, Melbourne (crowd: 22,133)	Report
5.7 (37); 12.9 (81); 16.14 (110); 21.15 (141)	**Q1; Q2; Q3; Final**	0.4 (4); 3.8 (26); 7.11 (53); 12.15 (87)	Umpires: Margetts, Brown, Donlon; Television broadcast: Fox Footy
Ziebell **3** Brown, Atley, McDonald, Wright, Jacobs **2** Higgins, Wood, Simpkin, Goldstein, Williams, Hartung, Tarrant, Cunnington **1**	**Goals**	**5** D. Beams; **2** McStay; **1** McInerney, Bailey, Keays, Taylor, Zorko
Cunnington, Higgins, McDonald, Ahern, Tarrant, Atley, Goldstein	**Best**	D. Beams, Andrews, Hodge, Bailey
Waite (calf soreness) replaced in selected side by Murphy, Anderson (hamstring)	**Injuries**	Berry (hamstring soreness) replaced in selected side by Keays, Christensen (concussion), Cameron (foot), McCluggage (calf), Robinson (foot)
Nil	**Reports**	Robinson (Brisbane) for rough contact on Higgins in the third quarter

===== Round 12 =====
Round 12
Sunday, 10 June (1:10 pm)	Brisbane Lions	def. by	**Essendon**	The Gabba, Brisbane (crowd: 20,476)	Report
2.4 (16); 3.7 (25); 5.9 (39); 8.14 (62)	**Q1; Q2; Q3; Final**	4.0 (24); 7.4 (46); 8.11 (59); 12.12 (84)	Umpires: O'Gorman, McInerney, Wallace; Television broadcast: Fox Footy
Hipwood, Zorko **2** Berry, McInerney, McStay, Martin **1**	**Goals**	**3** Stringer; **2** Brown, Heppell, McDonald-Tipungwuti; **1** Green, Guelfi, McKernan
Andrews, Rich, Gardiner, Witherden, Martin, Zorko	**Best**	Z. Merrett, Stringer, McGrath, Myers, Smith, Saad
Nil	**Injuries**	Heppell (concussion), Smith (calf)
Nil	**Reports**	Nil

===== Round 13 =====
Round 13
**Bye**; Brisbane Lions

===== Round 14 =====
Round 14
Saturday, 23 June (4:35 pm)	Brisbane Lions	def. by	**Greater Western Sydney**	The Gabba, Brisbane (crowd: 11,267)	Report
3.2 (20); 4.4 (28); 7.6 (48); 12.10 (82)	**Q1; Q2; Q3; Final**	5.2 (32); 8.4 (52); 10.9 (69); 16.13 (109)	Umpires: Donlon, Fisher, Harris, Pannell; Television broadcast: Fox Footy
Hipwood **3** Christensen **2** Zorko, Cutler, McInerney, Berry, D. Beams, Bailey, Hodge **1**	**Goals**	**3** J. Cameron, Patton; **2** Kelly, Griffen; **1** Finlayson, Taranto, Hopper, Reid, Langdon, Himmelberg
Rich, Hodge, D. Beams, Taylor, McCluggage, Walker	**Best**	Kelly, Whitfield, Shiel, Coniglio, Haynes, de Boer
Andrews (concussion), Gardiner (ankle)	**Injuries**	Nil
Nil	**Reports**	J. Cameron reported for striking Andrews in the first quarter

===== Round 15 =====
Round 15
Sunday, 1 July (2:40 pm)	Fremantle	def. by	**Brisbane Lions**	Optus Stadium, Perth (crowd: 41,674)	Report
1.4 (10); 3.6 (24); 6.9 (45); 9.10 (64)	**Q1; Q2; Q3; Final**	4.3 (27); 7.6 (48); 13.8 (86); 18.11 (119)	Umpires: Foot, Dalgleish, Brown; Television broadcast: Fox Footy
Cox, Ballantyne **2** Langdon, Apeness, Kersten, Giro, Mundy **1**	**Goals**	**3** Taylor, McStay; **2** Cutler, Rayner, McInerney, Hipwood; **1** Berry, Witherden, Zorko, Christensen
Neale, Langdon, Walters, Mundy	**Best**	Martin, D. Beams, Berry, Taylor, McStay, Cutler, Rayner
Sandilands (calf) replaced in selected side by Nyhuis, Fyfe (hamstring)	**Injuries**	Nil
Nil	**Reports**	Nil

===== Round 16 =====
Round 16
Saturday, 7 July (1:45 pm)	**Brisbane Lions**	def.	Carlton	The Gabba, Brisbane (crowd: 21,074)	Report
3.1 (19); 8.7 (55); 14.11 (95); 18.12 (120)	**Q1; Q2; Q3; Final**	2.5 (17); 2.6 (18); 4.8 (32); 7.13 (55)	Umpires: Haussen, Nicholls, Glouftsis; Television broadcast: Fox Footy
Hipwood **6** Barrett, Cutler **2** D. Beams, Christensen, McCluggage, McStay, Rayner, Robinson, Taylor, Zorko **1**	**Goals**	**3** C. Curnow; **2** Petrevski-Seton; **1** Lamb, O'Brien
D. Beams, Hipwood, Cutler, Gardiner, Zorko, Hodge, Berry	**Best**	Kreuzer, C. Curnow, E. Curnow, Cripps
Nil	**Injuries**	Phillips (hamstring), Weitering (calf), Marchbank (heart)
McInerney for striking Kennedy in the fourth quarter	**Reports**	Nil

===== Round 17 =====
Round 17
Saturday, 14 July (1:45 pm)	Hawthorn	def. by	**Brisbane Lions**	University of Tasmania Stadium, Launceston (crowd: 12,557)	Report
2.5 (17); 6.7 (43); 9.10 (64); 9.11 (65)	**Q1; Q2; Q3; Final**	2.1 (13); 5.2 (32); 11.6 (72); 15.8 (98)	Umpires: Fisher, Hay, Ryan; Television broadcast: Fox Footy
O'Meara **4** Gunston **2** Whitecross, Mitchell, Duryea **1**	**Goals**	**3** Rayner, Hipwood; **2** Robinson, McStay; **1** Christensen, Zorko, McCluggage, Taylor, Berry
O'Meara, Mitchell, Sicily, Shiels	**Best**	D. Beams, Rayner, Rich, Robinson, Berry, Walker
Nil	**Injuries**	Nil
Nil	**Reports**	Nil

===== Round 18 =====
Round 18
Saturday, 21 July (7:25 pm)	Brisbane Lions	def. by	**Adelaide**	The Gabba, Brisbane (crowd: 20,475)	Report
4.1 (25); 8.2 (50); 9.7 (61); 13.10 (88)	**Q1; Q2; Q3; Final**	3.4 (22); 9.7 (61); 12.11 (83); 13.15 (93)	Umpires: Schmitt, Whetton, Mitchell; Television broadcast: Fox Footy
Berry, McInerney, McStay, Rayner **2** Barrett, Christensen, Hipwood, Taylor, Zorko **1**	**Goals**	**4** Greenwood; **2** Jenkins, Knight; **1** Betts, Gallucci, Gibbs, Laird, Seedsman
Robertson, Lester, Witherden, Rayner, Zorko	**Best**	Laird, Greenwood, B. Crouch, Milera, Jenkins
Nil	**Injuries**	Murphy (nose), Doedee (concussion)
Nil	**Reports**	Nil

===== Round 19 =====
Round 19
Saturday, 28 July (2:10 pm)	**Geelong**	def.	Brisbane Lions	GMHBA Stadium, Geelong (crowd: 28,226)	Report
2.4 (16); 7.6 (48); 11.11 (77); 18.12 (120)	**Q1; Q2; Q3; Final**	2.4 (16); 5.7 (37); 7.10 (52); 11.12 (78)	Umpires: Deboy, McInerney, Mollison; Television broadcast: Fox Footy
Hawkins **7** Henry, Menzel **3** S. Selwood **2** Parfitt, C. Guthrie, Menegola **1**	**Goals**	**2** McStay; **1** D. Beams, Zorko, Rayner, Robertson, Taylor, Christensen, Hipwood, Robinson, Barrett
Hawkins, Ablett, Dangerfield, Stanley, S. Selwood, Parfitt, Menegola	**Best**	D. Beams, Zorko, McStay, Robinson, Taylor, Gardiner
Stewart (left ankle)	**Injuries**	Nil
Nil	**Reports**	Nil

===== Round 20 =====
Round 20
Saturday, 4 August (2:10 pm)	Brisbane Lions	def. by	**North Melbourne**	The Gabba, Brisbane (crowd: 18,395)	Report
6.0 (36); 9.2 (56); 13.4 (82); 16.8 (104)	**Q1; Q2; Q3; Final**	5.1 (31); 12.6 (78); 14.9 (93); 16.11 (107)	Umpires: Brown, Chamberlain, Pannell; Television broadcast: Fox Footy
McCluggage **3** Rayner, Robinson, Mathieson, McInerney, Zorko **2** Hipwood, Taylor, Christensen **1**	**Goals**	**3** Ziebell; **2** Walker, Atley, Waite, Turner; **1** Cunnington, Hrovat, Wood, Simpkin, Brown
McCluggage, Zorko, Berry, Christensen, Robinson, Andrews	**Best**	Ziebell, Dumont, Daw, Simpkin, Goldstein
Nil	**Reports**	Nil

===== Round 21 =====
Round 21
Saturday, 11 August (7:25 pm)	**Collingwood**	def.	Brisbane Lions	Etihad Stadium, Melbourne (crowd: 33,390)	Report
1.3 (9); 5.7 (37); 11.14 (80); 14.20 (104)	**Q1; Q2; Q3; Final**	3.4 (22); 5.4 (34); 8.4 (52); 11.7 (73)	Umpires: Rosebury, Williamson, Glouftsis; Television broadcast: Fox Footy
De Goey **4** Mihocek **3** Stephenson, Mayne **2** Varcoe, Sier, Thomas **1**	**Goals**	**3** Hipwood; **2** McStay, Robinson, Taylor; **1** Cutler, Beams
De Goey, Adams, Grundy, Sidebottom, Sier, Pendlebury, Greenwood	**Best**	Beams, Hodge, Berry, Witherden, Hipwood, Martin
Nil	**Injuries**	Gardiner (dislocated right shoulder)
Nil	**Reports**	Nil

===== Round 22 =====
Round 22
Saturday, 18 August (7:25 pm)	Gold Coast	def. by	**Brisbane Lions**	Metricon Stadium, Carrara (crowd: 11,907)	Report
1.2 (8); 6.4 (40); 8.6 (54); 11.8 (74)	**Q1; Q2; Q3; Final**	3.5 (23); 6.10 (46); 7.15 (57); 10.18 (78)	Umpires: Haussen, Whetton, Meredith; Marcus Ashcroft Medal: Dayne Beams (Brisbane Lions); Television broadcast: Fox Footy
Sexton **4** Ainsworth, Bowes, Crossley, Fiorini, Holman, Lyons, Young **1**	**Goals**	**2** Taylor; **1** Andrews, D. Beams, Christensen, Mathieson, McCluggage, Rayner, Starcevich, Walker
Sexton, Bowes, Miller, Swallow, Fiorini, Harbrow	**Best**	D. Beams, McCluggage, Hodge, Andrews, Berry, Martin
Nil	**Injuries**	Witherden (hamstring)
Sean Lemmens (Gold Coast) reported for striking Brandon Starcevich (Brisbane) in the second quarter	**Reports**	Nil

===== Round 23 =====
Round 23
Sunday, 26 August (1:10 pm)	Brisbane Lions	def. by	**West Coast**	The Gabba, Brisbane (crowd: 16,367)	Report
4.0 (24); 4.2 (26); 7.6 (48); 11.6 (72)	**Q1; Q2; Q3; Final**	5.4 (34); 9.7 (61); 12.12 (84); 14.14 (98)	Umpires: Haussen, Ryan, Fleer; Television broadcast: Fox Footy
Bailey, D. Beams **2** Berry, Hipwood, Mathieson, McInerney, McStay, Robertson, Taylor **1**	**Goals**	**4** Darling; **3** Cripps; **2** Rioli, Ryan, Venables; **1** Hutchings
Christensen, Cutler, Bailey, D. Beams, Berry	**Best**	Cripps, Darling, Redden, Shuey, Sheed, Ryan, Hutchings
Zorko (head)	**Injuries**	TBC
Nil	**Reports**	Nil

== Milestones ==
Round	Opponent	Player	Milestone
1	St Kilda	Cameron Rayner	AFL debut
1	St Kilda	Luke Hodge	Club debut
1	St Kilda	Charlie Cameron	Club debut
1	St Kilda	Mitch Robinson	50 club games
2	Melbourne	Allen Christensen	100 AFL games
4	Richmond	Dayne Beams	150 AFL games
4	Richmond	Zac Bailey	AFL debut
6	Greater Western Sydney	Oscar McInerney	AFL debut
7	Collingwood	Tom Cutler	50 AFL games
7	Collingwood	Matt Eagles	AFL debut
12	Essendon	Sam Mayes	100 AFL games
15	Fremantle	Stefan Martin	150 AFL games
15	Fremantle	Dayne Beams	50 club games
16	Carlton	Lewis Taylor	100 AFL games
18	Adelaide	Allen Christensen	50 club games
20	North Melbourne	Brandon Starcevich	AFL debut
21	Collingwood	Eric Hipwood	50 AFL games

== Awards and nominations ==
=== AFL ===
==== Nominations ====
Round	Opponent	Award	Player	Notes
5	Gold Coast	Goal of the Year	Charlie Cameron	Gathered the ball under pressure and fended off a tackle before snapping truly on his non-preferred side.
9	Hawthorn	AFL Rising Star	Alex Witherden	24 disposals
9	Hawthorn	Mark of the Year	Charlie Cameron	Took an acrobatic leap over teammate Darcy Gardiner.
15	Fremantle	AFL Rising Star	Cameron Rayner	19 disposals (11 contested), 2 goals

==== 2018 Brownlow Medal ====
Overall rank	Player	Votes
=8	Dayne Beams	18
=64	Eric Hipwood	6
=64	Dayne Zorko	6
=82	Stefan Martin	5
=105	Cameron Rayner	3
=141	Harris Andrews	2
=169	Jarrod Berry	1
=169	Tom Cutler (ineligible)	1
=169	Hugh McCluggage	1
=169	Mitch Robinson (ineligible)	1
=169	Alex Witherden	1
