= 2016 Brisbane Lions season =

Brisbane Lions
2016 season
- President: Bob Sharpless
- Coach: Justin Leppitsch
- Captain: Tom Rockliff
- Home ground: The Gabba (Capacity: 42,000)

The Brisbane Lions' 2016 season was its 20th season in the Australian Football League (AFL). The club won only three matches during the season, finishing second from bottom.

== Squad ==
Brisbane Lions
Senior list		Rookie list	Coaching staff
1 Ben Keays; 2 Ryan Harwood; 3 Allen Christensen; 4 Ryan Bastinac; 5 Mitch Robinson; 6 Josh Green; 7 Tom Bell; 8 Rohan Bewick; 9 Dayne Beams (vc); 10 Daniel Rich (vc); 11 Pearce Hanley (vc); 12 Stefan Martin; 13 Trent West; 14 Josh Walker; 15 Dayne Zorko (vc); 16 Jarrad Jansen; 17 Claye Beams; 18 Nick Robertson; 19 Josh Clayton; 20 Josh Watts	21 Daniel Merrett (vc); 22 Marco Paparone; 23 Josh Schache; 24 Liam Dawson; 25 Daniel McStay; 26 Tom Cutler; 27 Darcy Gardiner; 28 Lewis Taylor; 29 Jaden McGrath; 30 Eric Hipwood; 31 Harris Andrews; 32 Sam Mayes; 33 Michael Close; 34 Jonathan Freeman; 35 Ryan Lester; 36 Rhys Mathieson; 38 Tom Rockliff (c); 41 Sam Skinner; 42 Justin Clarke (ret); 43 Josh McGuinness	37 Cian Hanley (B); 39 Jackson Paine; 40 Matthew Hammelmann; 44 Archie Smith (B); 45 Hugh Beasley; 46 Billy Evans; 47 Reuben William	Head coach: Justin Leppitsch; Assistant coaches: Simon Black (midfield coach); Scott Borlace (development coach); Danny Daly (stoppage strategy coach); Murray Davis (transition strategy coach); Mitch Hahn (backline coach); Leigh Harding (development coach); Ben Hudson (ruck/forwards coach); Gary O'Donnell (skill development and training coordinator); Shane Woewodin (NEAFL coach); Legend: (c) Captain(s); (vc) Vice-captain(s); Injury list; Upgraded rookie(s); (ret) Retired; (B) Category B rookie; Updated: 27 November 2015; Source(s): Senior list, Rookie list, Coaching staff

== Season summary ==
=== Pre-season matches ===
**Rd**	**Date and local time**	**Opponent**	**Scores** (Brisbane's scores indicated in **bold**)			**Venue**	**Attendance**
**Rd**	**Date and local time**	**Opponent**	Home	Away	Result	**Venue**	**Attendance**
1	Sunday, 21 February (3:40 pm)	Gold Coast	**0.6.7 (43)**	0.9.14 (68)	Lost by 25 points	Moreton Bay Central Sports Complex (H)	3,807
2	Sunday, 6 March (3:40 pm) (cancelled)	St Kilda	N/A	N/A	N/A	Harrup Park Country Club (H)	N/A
3	Sunday, 13 March (12:10 pm)	Greater Western Sydney	**2.9.11 (83)**	1.17.11 (122)	Lost by 39 points	Metricon Stadium (H)	1,504

=== Premiership Season ===
==== Home and away season ====
**Rd**	**Date and local time**	**Opponent**	**Scores** (Brisbane's scores indicated in **bold**)			**Venue**	**Attendance**	**Ladder** **position**
**Rd**	**Date and local time**	**Opponent**	Home	Away	Result	**Venue**	**Attendance**	**Ladder** **position**
1	Sunday, 27 March (4:40 pm)	West Coast	26.10 (166)	**15.12 (102)**	Lost by 64 points	Subiaco Oval (A)	35,201	15th
2	Saturday, 2 April (3:35 pm)	North Melbourne	**11.17 (83)**	17.15 (117)	Lost by 34 points	The Gabba (H)	18,021	16th
3	Sunday, 10 April (4:40 pm)	Geelong	18.17 (125)	**7.14 (56)**	Lost by 69 points	Kardinia Park (A)	23,320	18th
4	Saturday, 16 April (4:35 pm)	Gold Coast	**14.23 (107)**	14.10 (94)	Won by 13 points	The Gabba (H)	20,041	14th
5	Saturday, 23 April (7:25 pm)	Western Bulldogs	17.18 (120)	**10.7 (67)**	Lost by 53 points	Docklands Stadium (A)	25,097	16th
6	Sunday, 1 May (1:10 pm)	Sydney	**14.10 (94)**	15.7 (97)	Lost by 3 points	The Gabba (H)	14,646	16th
7	Sunday, 8 May (4:10 pm)	Port Adelaide	21.10 (136)	**7.17 (59)**	Lost by 77 points	Adelaide Oval (A)	32,399	16th
8	Saturday, 14 May (7:25 pm)	Collingwood	**10.5 (65)**	20.23 (143)	Lost by 78 points	The Gabba (H)	24,552	16th
9	Sunday, 22 May (1:10 pm)	Melbourne	19.17 (131)	**9.14 (68)**	Lost by 63 points	MCG (A)	26,892	16th
10	Saturday, 28 May (1:45 pm)	Hawthorn	**13.9 (87)**	21.9 (135)	Lost by 48 points	The Gabba (H)	23,691	16th
11	Saturday, 4 June (2:10 pm)	Carlton	16.6 (102)	**9.10 (64)**	Lost by 38 points	Docklands Stadium (A)	30,722	17th
12	Saturday, 11 June (4:35 pm)	Fremantle	**9.10 (64)**	23.9 (147)	Lost by 83 points	The Gabba (H)	12,899	17th
13	Saturday, 18 June (1:40 pm)	West Coast	**12.10 (82)**	20.11 (131)	Lost by 49 points	The Gabba (H)	12,777	17th
14	Saturday, 25 June (1:40 pm)	Richmond	17.15 (117)	**11.9 (75)**	Lost by 42 points	MCG (A)	28,883	17th
15	Bye							17th
16	Saturday, 9 July (4:35 pm)	Gold Coast	22.7 (139)	**17.11 (113)**	Lost by 26 points	Carrara Stadium (A)	13,528	17th
17	Sunday, 17 July (4:40 pm)	Greater Western Sydney	**9.13 (67)**	22.14 (146)	Lost by 79 points	The Gabba (H)	10,195	17th
18	Sunday, 24 July (1:10 pm)	Essendon	12.19 (91)	**20.8 (128)**	Won by 37 points	Docklands Stadium (A)	34,869	17th
19	Saturday, 30 July (7:25 pm)	Port Adelaide	**11.13 (79)**	25.23 (173)	Lost by 94 points	The Gabba (H)	13,085	17th
20	Saturday, 6 August (7:10 pm)	Adelaide	27.15 (177)	**6.3 (39)**	Lost by 138 points	Adelaide Oval (A)	43,549	17th
21	Saturday, 13 August (1:45 pm)	Carlton	**15.9 (99)**	13.17 (95)	Won by 4 points	The Gabba (H)	17,432	17th
22	Sunday, 21 August (3:20 pm)	Geelong	10.9 (69)	**19.15 (129)**	Lost by 60 points	The Gabba (H)	20,477	17th
23	Saturday, 27 August (12:00 pm)	St Kilda	**25.11 (161)**	15.13 (103)	Lost by 58 points	Docklands Stadium (A)	21,834	17th

== Ladder ==
Pos	Team	Pld	W	L	D	PF	PA	PP	Pts	Qualification
1	Sydney	22	17	5	0	2221	1469	151.2	68	2016 finals
2	Geelong	22	17	5	0	2235	1554	143.8	68	2016 finals
3	Hawthorn	22	17	5	0	2134	1800	118.6	68	2016 finals
4	Greater Western Sydney	22	16	6	0	2380	1663	143.1	64	2016 finals
5	Adelaide	22	16	6	0	2483	1795	138.3	64	2016 finals
6	West Coast	22	16	6	0	2181	1678	130.0	64	2016 finals
7	Western Bulldogs (P)	22	15	7	0	1857	1609	115.4	60	2016 finals
8	North Melbourne	22	12	10	0	1956	1859	105.2	48	2016 finals
9	St Kilda	22	12	10	0	1953	2041	95.7	48	
10	Port Adelaide	22	10	12	0	2055	1939	106.0	40	
11	Melbourne	22	10	12	0	1944	1991	97.6	40	
12	Collingwood	22	9	13	0	1910	1998	95.6	36	
13	Richmond	22	8	14	0	1713	2155	79.5	32	
14	Carlton	22	7	15	0	1568	1978	79.3	28	
15	Gold Coast	22	6	16	0	1778	2273	78.2	24	
16	Fremantle	22	4	18	0	1574	2119	74.3	16	
17	Brisbane Lions	22	3	19	0	1770	2872	61.6	12	
18	Essendon	22	3	19	0	1437	2356	61.0	12	

Source: AFL
Rules for classification: 1) points; 2) percentage; 3) number of points for.
(P) Premiers
