= 2014 Brisbane Lions season =

Brisbane Lions
2014 season
- Coach: Justin Leppitsch
- Captain: Jed Adcock
- Home ground: The Gabba
- Regular season: 15th
- Highest home attendance: 27,167 vs. Gold Coast (Round 18)
- Lowest home attendance: 13,610 vs. West Coast Eagles (Round 17)
- Average home attendance: 19,735

The 2014 Brisbane Lions season was the club's 18th season in the Australian Football League (AFL). The club also fielded its reserves team in the NEAFL.

== Squad ==
Players are listed by jersey number, and 2014 statistics are for AFL regular season and finals series matches during the 2013 AFL season only. Career statistics include a player's complete AFL career, which, as a result, means that a player's debut and part or whole of their career statistics may be for another club. Statistics are correct of Round 19 of the 2014 season (3 August 2014) and are taken from AFL Tables

No.	Name	AFL debut	Games (2014)	Goals (2014)	Games (Brisbane)	Goals (Brisbane)	Games (AFL career)	Goals (AFL career)
1	Luke McGuane	2006 (Richmond)	3	0	3	0	108	39
2	Ryan Harwood	2010	14	2	56	6	56	6
3	Brent Moloney	2003 (Geelong)	5	1	21	9	166	46
4	James Aish	2014	21	6	21	6	21	6
5	Jack Crisp	2012	6	6	18	10	18	10
6	Josh Green	2011	20	33	54	72	54	72
7	Jed Adcock	2004	22	3	185	42	185	42
8	Rohan Bewick	2011	16	9	63	47	63	47
9	Ashley McGrath	2001	6	5	214	170	214	170
10	Daniel Rich	2009	3	0	101	67	101	67
11	Pearce Hanley	2008	20	6	96	35	96	35
12	Stefan Martin	2008 (Melbourne)	12	1	17	5	74	28
13	Trent West	2008 (Geelong)	10	4	10	4	64	27
14	Brent Staker	2003 (West Coast Eagles)	0	0	44	35	154	119
15	Dayne Zorko	2012	21	18	59	60	59	60
16	Jonathan Brown	2000	11	21	256	594	256	594
17	Claye Beams	2011	13	9	28	21	28	21
18	Nick Robertson	2014	8	0	8	0	8	0
19	Jordan Lisle	2011 (Hawthorn)	5	0	18	15	23	16
21	Daniel Merrett	2005	19	12	171	69	171	69
22	Marco Paparone	2013	18	7	23	12	23	12
23	Matthew Leuenberger	2007	5	0	94	20	94	20
24	Joel Patfull	2006	21	2	182	24	182	24
25	Daniel McStay	2014	9	7	9	7	9	7
26	Tom Cutler	2014	7	2	7	2	7	2
27	Darcy Gardiner	2014	17	2	17	2	17	2
28	Lewis Taylor	2014	22	12	22	12	22	12
29	Andrew Raines	2004 (Richmond)	4	1	67	14	123	15
30	Jack Redden	2009	14	6	112	50	112	50
31	James Polkinghorne	2008	2	0	94	53	94	53
32	Sam Mayes	2013	21	11	39	23	39	23
33	Michael Close	2014	14	10	14	10	14	10
34	Jonathan Freeman	2014	4	6	4	6	4	6
35	Ryan Lester	2011	14	3	52	12	52	12
36	Matt Maguire	2002 (St Kilda)	13	1	69	2	168	21
37	Patrick Wearden	****	0	0	0	0	0	0
38	Tom Rockliff	2009	18	10	101	51	101	51
39	Jackson Paine	2012 (Collingwood)	6	3	6	3	12	11
40	Isaac Conway	****	0	0	0	0	0	0
41	Mitchell Golby	2011	12	0	51	6	51	6
42	Justin Clarke	2013	22	1	36	1	36	1
43	Nick Hayes	****	0	0	0	0	0	0
44	Archie Smith	****	0	0	0	0	0	0
45	Jordon Bourke	2014	1	0	1	0	1	0
46	Sam Michael	2013	0	0	3	0	3	0
47	Zac O'Brien	2014	5	1	5	1	5	1

== Season summary ==
=== Pre-season matches ===
Brisbane Lions' 2014 NAB Challenge fixtures
**Rd**	**Date and local time**	**Opponent**	**Scores** (Brisbane's scores indicated in **bold**)			**Venue**	**Attendance**
**Rd**	**Date and local time**	**Opponent**	Home	Away	Result	**Venue**	**Attendance**
1	Monday, 17 February (4:10 pm)	Hawthorn	1.22.13 (154)	**0.3.5 (23)**	Lost by 131 points	Etihad Stadium (A)	5,003
2	Sunday, 23 February (3:40 pm)	Gold Coast	**1.14.13 (106)**	0.8.11 (59)	Won by 47 points	Tony Ireland Stadium (H)	6,426

Brisbane Lions' 2014 Practice Matches
**Rd**	**Date and local time**	**Opponent**	**Scores** (Brisbane's scores indicated in **bold**)			**Venue**	**Attendance**
**Rd**	**Date and local time**	**Opponent**	Home	Away	Result	**Venue**	**Attendance**
1	Saturday, 8 March (2:30 pm)	Sydney	**8.11 (59)**	12.14 (86)	Lost by 27 points	Burpengary Regional Sports Park (H)	6,096

=== Home and Away Season ===
**Rd**	**Date and local time**	**Opponent**	**Scores** (Brisbane's scores indicated in **bold**)			**Venue**	**Attendance**	**Ladder position**
**Rd**	**Date and local time**	**Opponent**	Home	Away	Result	**Venue**	**Attendance**	**Ladder position**
1	Saturday, 22 March (4:40 pm)	Hawthorn	21.13 (139)	**13.13 (91)**	Lost by 48 points	Aurora Stadium (A)	12,430	15th
2	Sunday, 30 March (1:10 pm)	Geelong	**10.8 (68)**	13.15 (93)	Lost by 25 points	Gabba (H)	20,933	15th
3	Saturday, 5 April (3:40 pm)	Gold Coast	17.12 (114)	**9.7 (61)**	Lost by 53 points	Metricon Stadium (A)	16,593	16th
4	Saturday, 12 April (1:40 pm)	Port Adelaide	24.15 (159)	**7.4 (46)**	Lost by 113 points	Adelaide Oval (A)	36,231	18th
5	Thursday, 17 April (7:50 pm)	Richmond	**9.9 (63)**	15.16 (106)	Lost by 43 points	Gabba (H)	20,676	18th
6	Friday, 25 April (7:45 pm)	St Kilda	11.13 (79)	**12.10 (82)**	Won by 3 points	Westpac Stadium (A)	13,409	18th
7	Saturday, 3 May (7:40 pm)	Sydney	**6.8 (44)**	18.15 (123)	Lost by 79 points	Gabba (H)	17,957	18th
8	Saturday, 10 May (4:40 pm)	Essendon	**8.9 (57)**	9.11 (65)	Lost by 8 points	Gabba (H)	26,432	18th
9	Saturday, 17 May (4:40 pm)	North Melbourne	17.23 (125)	**6.2 (38)**	Lost by 87 points	Etihad Stadium (A)	21,152	18th
10	Bye							18th
11	Saturday, 31 May (4:40 pm)	Carlton	**14.14 (98)**	13.13 (91)	Won by 7 points	Gabba (H)	24,625	18th
12	Saturday, 7 June (7:40 pm)	Western Bulldogs	13.9 (87)	**14.11 (95)**	Won by 8 points	Etihad Stadium (A)	18,054	16th
13	Saturday, 14 June (7:40 pm)	Greater Western Sydney	**12.8 (80)**	19.11 (125)	Lost by 45 points	Gabba (H)	12,700	17th
14	Saturday, 21 June (5:40 pm)	Fremantle	15.15 (105)	**3.4 (22)**	Lost by 83 points	Patersons Stadium (A)	25,152	17th
15	Saturday, 28 June (7:40 pm)	North Melbourne	**10.10 (70)**	9.12 (66)	Won by 4 points	Gabba (H)	15,862	17th
16	Saturday, 5 July (1:45 pm)	Richmond	12.7 (79)	**7.12 (54)**	Lost by 25 points	MCG (A)	34,560	17th
17	Saturday, 12 July (7:40 pm)	West Coast	**9.10 (64)**	11.10 (76)	Lost by 12 points	Gabba (H)	13,610	17th
18	Saturday, 26 July (4:40 pm)	Gold Coast	**16.14 (110)**	8.8 (56)	Won by 54 points	Gabba (H)	27,167	15th
19	Sunday, 3 August (1:10 pm)	Melbourne	6.15 (51)	**11.8 (74)**	Won by 23 points	Etihad Stadium (A)	18,079	15th
20	Sunday, 10 August (1:10 pm)	Adelaide	**9.9 (63)**	25.18 (168)	Lost by 105 points	Gabba (H)	19,657	15th
21	Saturday, 16 August (7:40 pm)	Collingwood	8.8 (56)	**18.15 (123)**	Won by 67 points	MCG (A)	32,926	15th
22	Sunday, 24 August (1:10 pm)	Fremantle	**6.12 (48)**	15.16 (106)	Lost by 58 points	Gabba (H)	17,473	15th
23	Saturday, 30 August (7:40 pm)	Geelong	21.17 (143)	**12.9 (81)**	Lost by 62 points	Simonds Stadium (A)	24,659	15th

== Ladder ==
2014 AFL ladder
Pos	Team	Pld	W	L	D	PF	PA	PP	Pts	
1	Sydney	22	17	5	0	2126	1488	142.9	68	Finals series
2	Hawthorn (P)	22	17	5	0	2458	1746	140.8	68	Finals series
3	Geelong	22	17	5	0	2033	1787	113.8	68	Finals series
4	Fremantle	22	16	6	0	2029	1556	130.4	64	Finals series
5	Port Adelaide	22	14	8	0	2180	1678	129.9	56	Finals series
6	North Melbourne	22	14	8	0	2026	1731	117.0	56	Finals series
7	Essendon	22	12	9	1	1828	1719	106.3	50	Finals series
8	Richmond	22	12	10	0	1887	1784	105.8	48	Finals series
9	West Coast	22	11	11	0	2045	1750	116.9	44	
10	Adelaide	22	11	11	0	2175	1907	114.1	44	
11	Collingwood	22	11	11	0	1766	1876	94.1	44	
12	Gold Coast	22	10	12	0	1917	2045	93.7	40	
13	Carlton	22	7	14	1	1891	2107	89.7	30	
14	Western Bulldogs	22	7	15	0	1784	2177	81.9	28	
15	Brisbane Lions	22	7	15	0	1532	2212	69.3	28	
16	Greater Western Sydney	22	6	16	0	1780	2320	76.7	24	
17	Melbourne	22	4	18	0	1336	1954	68.4	16	
18	St Kilda	22	4	18	0	1480	2436	60.8	16	

Source: AFL Tables
Rules for classification: 1) points; 2) percentage; 3) number of points for.
(P) Premiers
