= Justin Leppitsch =

Australian rules footballer, born 1975

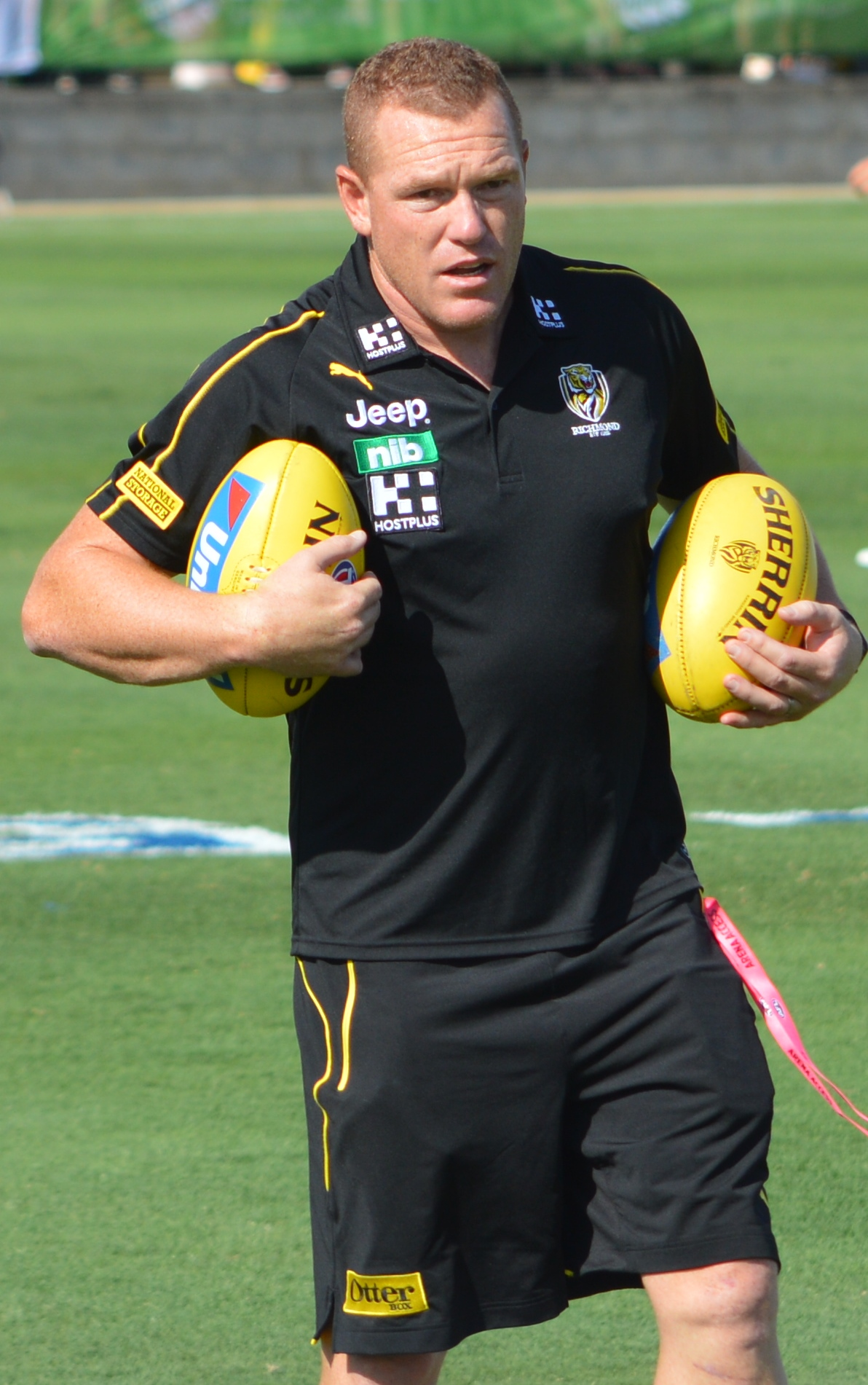
- Leppitsch with Richmond in March 2019

Personal information
- Full name: Justin Leppitsch
- Nickname: Leppa
- Born: 1 October 1975 (age 51); Melbourne, Australia
- Original team: Southern Stingrays
- Draft: No. 4, 1992 National Draft, Brisbane Bears
- Height: 191 cm (6 ft 3 in)
- Weight: 98 kg (216 lb)
- Position: Defender

Playing career^{1}
Years	Club	Games (Goals)
1993–1996	Brisbane Bears	44 (58)
1997–2006	Brisbane Lions	183 (136)
Total		227 (194)

Representative team honours
Years	Team	Games (Goals)
1999	Victoria	1 (0)

International team honours
1999–2000	Australia	4 (0)

Coaching career^{3}
Years	Club	Games (W–L–D)
2014–2016	Brisbane Lions	66 (14–52–0)
- ^{1} Playing statistics correct to the end of 2006.^{3} Coaching statistics correct as of 2016.

Career highlights
- 3× AFL premiership: 2001, 2002, 2003; Merrett–Murray Medal: 1999; 3× All-Australian team: 1999, 2002, 2003; 2× Brisbane Lions leading goalkicker: 1997, 1998; Australian international rules team member: 1999, 2000

Justin Leppitsch (born 1 October 1975) is a former professional Australian rules footballer and the former coach of the Brisbane Lions in the Australian Football League (AFL).

== Early life ==
Leppitsch was raised in Berwick, Victoria. In 1992, he played in the newly established VSFL Under-18 competition (later known as the TAC Cup) with Southern Stingrays, where he was runner-up for the Morrish Medal, and caught the attention of Brisbane Bears talent scouts. He was selected by Brisbane at pick 4 in the 1992 AFL draft.

== AFL career ==
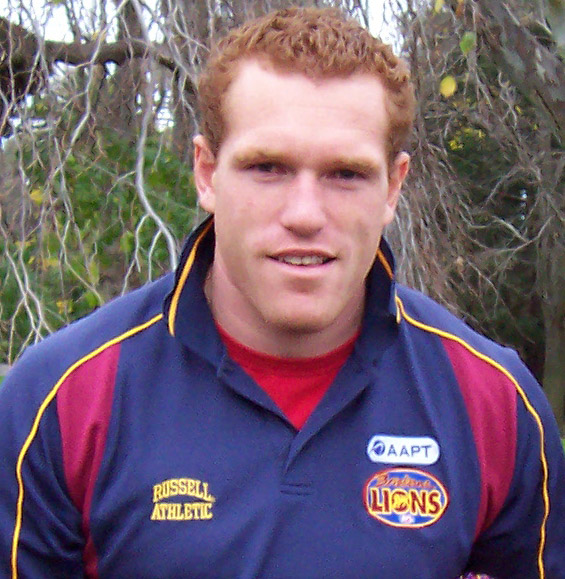
Leppitsch in 2006

He made his debut in 1993 for the Bears as a 17-year-old, but was then dropped back to play for West Brisbane where he hurt his knee and required a complete knee reconstruction. He was unable to play football for 15 months.

In 1997 he was a member of the inaugural Brisbane Lions team following the Bears merger with Fitzroy.

His breakout season was in 1999 under new coach Leigh Matthews, when he won the Brisbane Best and Fairest award, was selected as All-Australian for the first time and represented Australia in International Rules.

Under Matthews, Leppitsch became a key component of the Lions spine, playing centre half back in the club's three premiership sides from 2001 to 2003 and earned All-Australian status three times.

Late in his career, Leppitsch battled a chronic hamstring-related back injury which inevitably ended his career due to the resulting calf muscle wastage. He announced his immediate retirement from the AFL on 5 June 2006.

He was inducted into the Brisbane Lions Hall of Fame in 2012.

== Coaching career ==
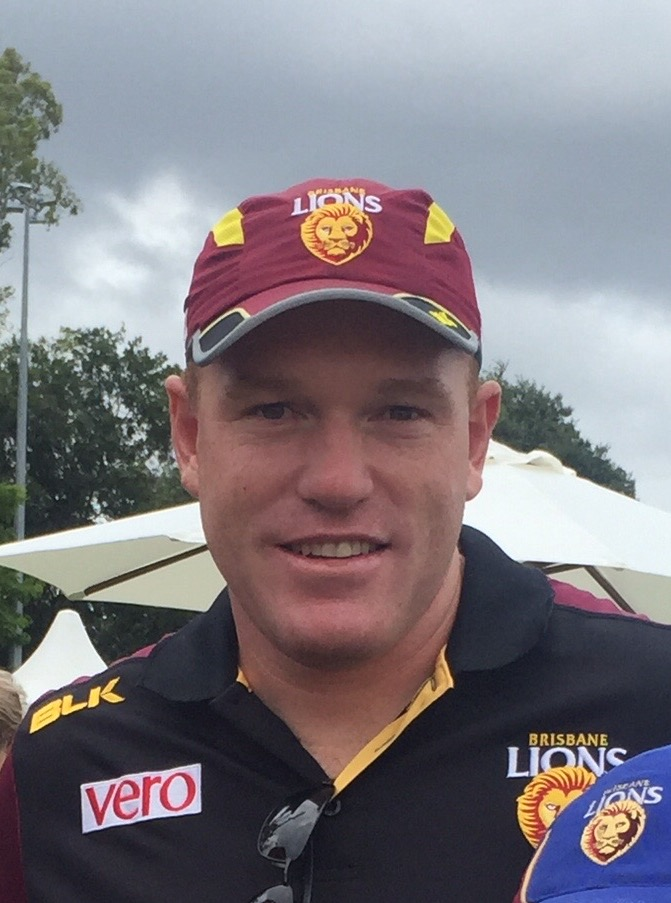
Leppitsch in February 2016

=== Assistant coaching roles ===
In October 2006, Leppitsch had accepted a position as an assistant coach with the Brisbane Lions. He later signed with Richmond to be an assistant coach in September 2009.

=== Brisbane Lions senior coach (2014–2016) ===
In September 2013, Leppitsch signed a three-year contract to be the senior coach of the Brisbane Lions. Leppitsch replaced Brisbane Lions caretaker senior coach Mark Harvey, who replaced Michael Voss after Voss stepped down during the 2013 season, after Voss was told that he would not receive a contract renewal as Brisbane Lions senior coach for the 2014 season.

In Leppitsch's first season as Brisbane Lions senior coach in the 2014 season, the club under Leppitsch finished fifteenth (third-last) on the ladder with seven wins and fifteen losses. In the 2015 season, The Lions under Leppitsch, finished seventeenth (second-last) on the ladder with four wins and eighteen losses. In the 2016 season, The Lions under Leppitsch, finished seventeenth (second-last) on the ladder again for the second straight year in a row, this time with three wins and nineteen losses. Leppitsch coached Brisbane Lions to a total of 66 games with 14 wins and 52 losses to a winning percentage of 22 percent.

On 29 August 2016, Leppitsch was sacked by the Lions as senior coach after three seasons with the club, at the end of the 2016 season. This occurred, despite being granted a one-year contract extension at the start of the year which would have seen him remain at the club until the end of the 2017 season. He was replaced by Chris Fagan as Brisbane Lions senior coach.

=== Richmond Football Club ===
On 6 October 2016, Leppitsch returned to Richmond as an assistant coach. Twelve months after being sacked as senior coach of the Brisbane Lions, he played a major role in the club's 2017 AFL premiership win, coaching the forwards. He was also an assistant coach during Richmond's 2019 and 2020 premierships. Leppitsch announced that he would leave Richmond as an assistant coach at the end of the 2020 season.

=== Collingwood Football Club ===
In September 2021, Leppitsch joined the Collingwood Football Club in an assistant coaching role as Head of Strategy and defence under senior coach Craig McRae.

Leppitsch again experienced premiership success as an assistant coach in 2023, when Collingwood defeated his old club the Brisbane Lions by four points in the Grand Final.

Since 2024, Leppitsch has been General Manager of talent and list strategy at Collingwood.

== Statistics ==
=== Playing statistics ===
Legend
G	Goals	K	Kicks	D	Disposals	T	Tackles
B	Behinds	H	Handballs	M	Marks

Season	Team	No.	Games	Totals							Averages (per game)						
Season	Team	No.	Games	G	B	K	H	D	M	T	G	B	K	H	D	M	T
1993	Brisbane Bears	23	4	4	2	27	12	39	3	5	1.0	0.5	6.8	3.0	9.8	0.8	1.3
1994	Brisbane Bears	23	4	5	4	19	5	24	5	1	1.3	1.0	4.8	1.3	6.0	1.3	0.3
1995	Brisbane Bears	23	17	4	8	96	54	150	48	17	0.2	0.5	5.6	3.2	8.8	2.8	1.0
1996	Brisbane Bears	23	19	45	23	152	49	201	57	18	2.4	1.2	8.0	2.6	10.6	3.0	0.9
1997	Brisbane Lions	23	22	50	38	186	63	249	97	20	2.3	1.7	8.5	2.9	11.3	4.4	0.9
1998	Brisbane Lions	23	16	26	17	145	52	197	64	19	1.6	1.1	9.1	3.3	12.3	4.0	1.2
1999	Brisbane Lions	23	25	14	12	242	86	328	129	30	0.6	0.5	9.7	3.4	13.1	5.2	1.2
2000	Brisbane Lions	23	22	11	12	207	127	334	125	29	0.5	0.5	9.4	5.8	15.2	5.7	1.3
2001	Brisbane Lions	23	11	6	3	69	35	104	43	4	0.5	0.3	6.3	3.2	9.5	3.9	0.4
2002	Brisbane Lions	23	23	12	10	208	82	290	115	32	0.5	0.4	9.0	3.6	12.6	5.0	1.4
2003	Brisbane Lions	23	22	10	3	193	105	298	126	32	0.5	0.1	8.8	4.8	13.5	5.7	1.5
2004	Brisbane Lions	23	24	6	2	173	110	283	108	40	0.3	0.1	7.2	4.6	11.8	4.5	1.7
2005	Brisbane Lions	23	14	0	0	144	80	224	80	29	0.0	0.0	10.3	5.7	16.0	5.7	2.1
2006	Brisbane Lions	23	4	1	0	32	19	51	20	2	0.3	0.0	8.0	4.8	12.8	5.0	0.5
Career			227	194	134	1893	879	2772	1020	278	0.9	0.6	8.3	3.9	12.2	4.5	1.2

== Head coaching record ==
Team	Year	Home and Away Season					Finals			
Team	Year	Won	Lost	Drew	Win %	Position	Won	Lost	Win %	Result
BRI	2014	7	15	0	.318	15th out of 18	—	—	—	—
BRI	2015	4	18	0	.182	17th out of 18	—	—	—	—
BRI	2016	3	19	0	.136	17th out of 18	—	—	—	—
Total		14	52	0	.212		—	—	—	
