= Nathan Williamson =

Australian rules football umpire

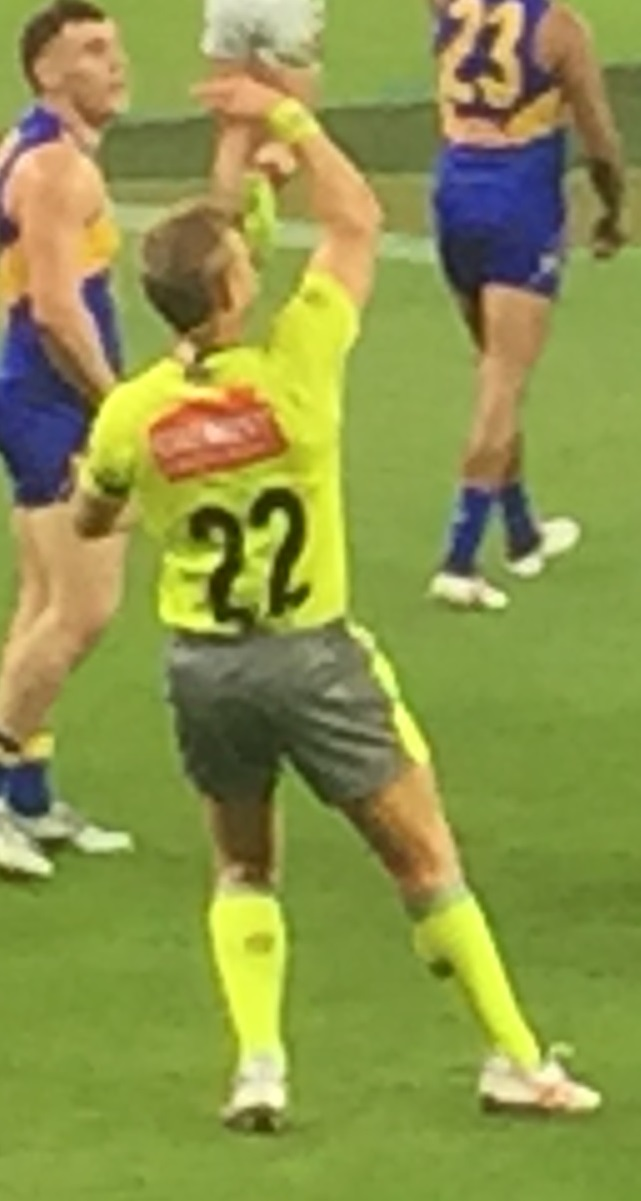
- Williamson umpiring a match in 2018 between the West Coast Eagles and the Essendon Bombers

Personal information
- Full name: Nathan Williamson
- Nickname: Nath
- Height: 179 cm (5 ft 10 in)
- Weight: 71 kg (157 lb)

Umpiring career
Years	League	Role	Games
2015–	AFL	Field umpire	192

Nathan Williamson is an Australian rules football umpire currently officiating in the Australian Football League.

He first umpired in West Australian junior football in 2005. He continued to officiate in Western Australia, umpiring in the 2015 and 2016 West Australian Football League grand finals. He was on the AFL umpiring rookie list for 2015 and 2016, before being promoted to the senior list in 2017. He umpired 22 matches in the 2017 season.
