= Brent Wallace =

Australian rules football umpire

Personal information
- Full name: Brent Wallace
- Nicknames: Wally, Wal
- Height: 179 cm (5 ft 10 in)
- Weight: 71 kg (157 lb)
- Other occupation

Umpiring career
Years	League	Role	Games
2014–	AFL	Field umpire	162

Brent Wallace is an Australian rules football umpire currently officiating in the Australian Football League.

He played for the Box Hill Hawks in the Victorian Football League before joining the player-to-umpire pathway. Before umpiring in the AFL, he umpired in the 2014 VFL Grand Final. He joined the AFL rookie list in 2014, and the senior list in 2015. He made his debut in Round 11 of that year, in a match between St Kilda and Melbourne.

He is the son of former player and coach Terry Wallace.
