= Eleni Tee =

Australian rules football umpire

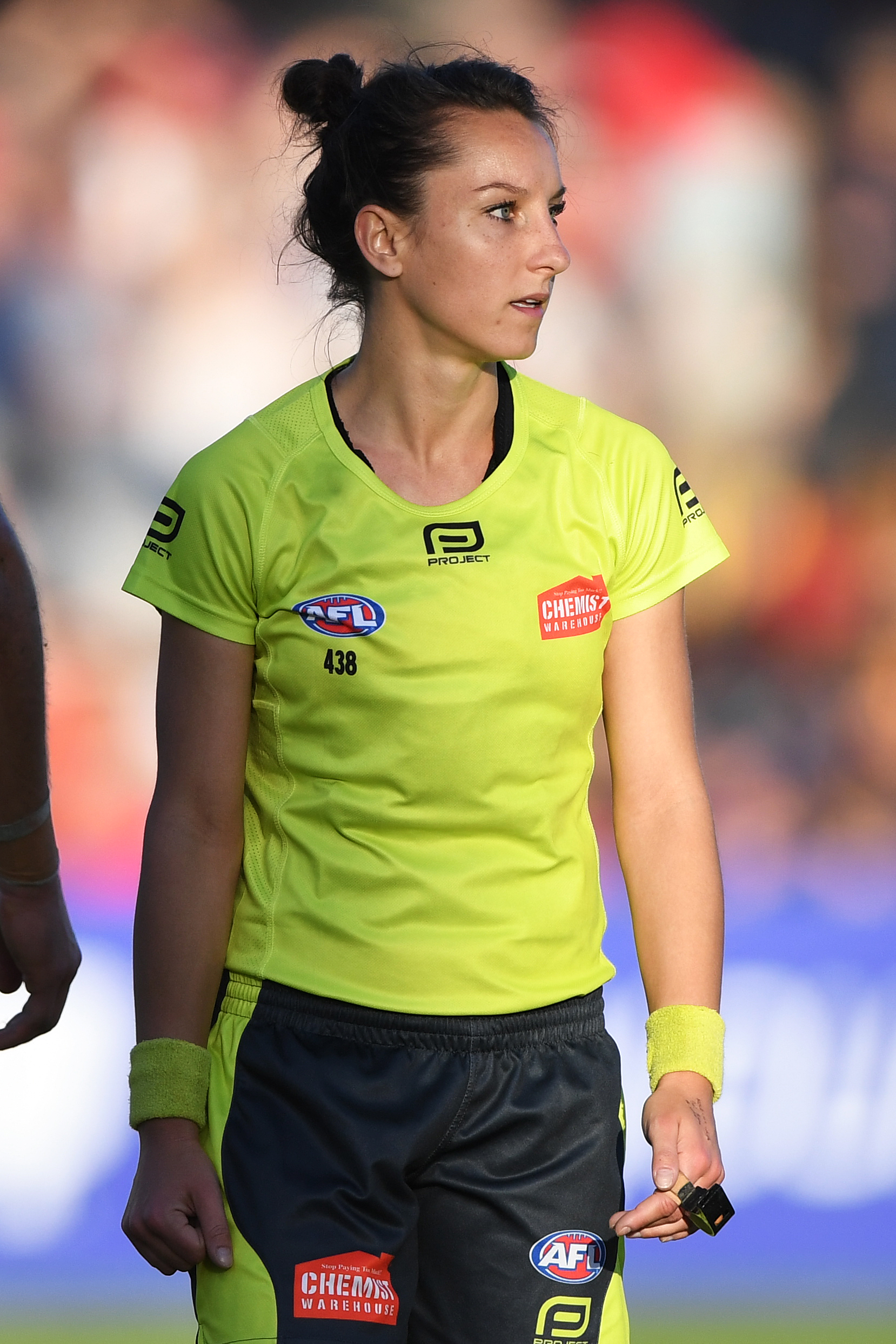
- Tee in July 2019

Personal information
- Full name: Eleni Andriana Tee
- Other occupation: PE teacher

Umpiring career
Years	League	Role	Games
2017–	AFL	Field umpire	102
2020–	AFLW	Field umpire	14

Eleni Andriana Tee (née Glouftsis) is an Australian rules football field umpire in the Australian Football League (AFL) and AFL Women's (AFLW). She was the first female field umpire ever to officiate an Australian Football League match.

== Umpiring career ==
Tee commenced umpiring in 2008 with the North Eastern Metro Junior Football Association in Adelaide, before commencing to umpire in the South Australian National Football League (SANFL). Tee umpired her first senior SANFL match in August 2013, becoming the first female to officiate as a field umpire in a SANFL match.

She then moved to Melbourne on a three-year AFL female pathway scholarship at the end of 2014, where she umpired in 12 Victorian Football League (VFL) matches during the 2015 season, umpiring her first VFL match in June of that year. Tee was also added to the AFL umpires rookie list as a field umpire at the beginning of the 2015 season, and trained with a dedicated coach within the AFL umpires group.

After officiating in two intra-club matches in the 2016 AFL pre-season, involving St Kilda and Essendon, she was appointed to her first AFL sanctioned match: a pre-season practice match between Carlton and Essendon played on 28 February 2016 at Princes Park, making her the first female field umpire ever to umpire an AFL sanctioned match.

In round 9 of the 2017 season, Tee was appointed to her senior AFL umpiring debut in the match between Essendon and West Coast, making her the first female field umpire to officiate an AFL premiership match. She was congratulated by then-Prime Minister of Australia, Malcolm Turnbull.

== Honours ==
On 1 November 2018, Tee was awarded the Young South Australian of 2019 in a ceremony at Adelaide Oval.

Tee was awarded an Order of Australia Medal in the 2021 Australia Day Honours, for "service to Australian rules football, particularly as an umpire".

== Personal life ==
Outside of umpiring, Tee is a physical education teacher at St. Bernard's College, Melbourne. Both her parents were football umpires, and her partner, Dillon Tee, is an AFL boundary umpire. In July 2019, Dillon proposed to Eleni in the middle of the Melbourne Cricket Ground after they had both umpired the round 19 match between Carlton and Adelaide.
