= Nick Brown (umpire) =

Australian rules football umpire

Personal information
- Full name: Nicholas Brown
- Height: 181 cm (5 ft 11 in)
- Weight: 73 kg (161 lb)
- Other occupation: Team leader

Umpiring career
Years	League	Role	Games
2015–2016 2018–	AFL	Field umpire	17

Nicholas Brown is an Australian rules football umpire currently officiating in the Australian Football League.

He joined the Victorian Football League in 2010, umpiring in the 2014 Grand Final. He was appointed to the AFL list in 2015 and made his debut in Round 9 of that year, in a match between Hawthorn and Gold Coast. He left the AFL list at the end of the 2016 season, but returned for the 2018 season.
