= Leigh Fisher =

Australian rules footballer and umpire

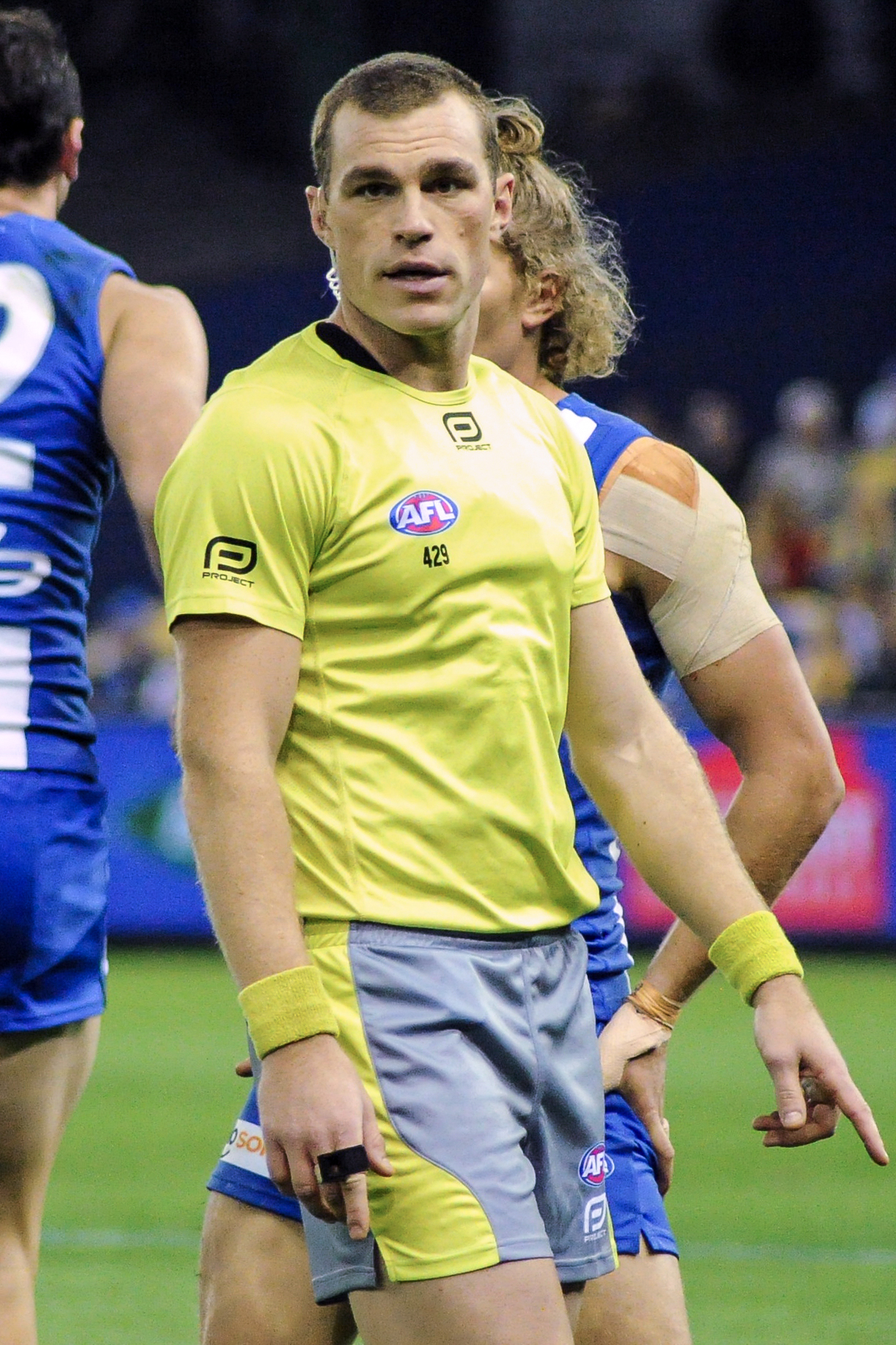
- Fisher in April 2018

Personal information
- Born: 19 April 1984 (age 42); Canberra, Australia
- Original team: Sandringham / Mentone Grammar School
- Draft: 46
- Debut: 3 August 2003, St Kilda vs. West Coast Eagles, at Docklands
- Height: 188 cm (6 ft 2 in)
- Weight: 92 kg (203 lb)
- Position: Defender

Playing career
Years	Club	Games (Goals)	
2003–2010	St Kilda	55 (5)	

Umpiring career
Years	League	Role	Games
2013–	AFL	Field umpire	263

Career highlights
- St Kilda Pre-season premiership 2008

Leigh Fisher (born 19 April 1984) is an Australian rules football umpire and former player in the Australian Football League (AFL).

== Playing career ==
Fisher was recruited as the number 46 draft pick in the 2002 AFL draft from Sandringham. He made his debut for St Kilda in 2003 against the West Coast Eagles in Round 18. Fisher went on to become a regular fixture in the Saints' best 22 playing as a small defender in 2006 and 2007.

In 2008, Fisher played in St Kilda's 2008 NAB Cup winning side – the club's third preseason win. However, he fell out of favour in the 2008 season. His last game for the Saints was in Round 11, 2008 against the Western Bulldogs. He did not play a game in 2009 and on 13 November 2009 Fisher was delisted by St Kilda.

Fisher was redrafted by St Kilda as a rookie player but was again delisted following the 2010 season.

Fisher originally wore number 22 until 2005 when he changed to number 6. He later wore the number 37 after he was redrafted. Over his career Fisher played in one AFL final and one NAB Cup final.

Following his playing career, Leigh turned to long-distance running, which set him up for the demands of AFL field umpiring. Leigh also completed the New York marathon under trying conditions in 2015.

== Umpiring career ==
In 2013, Fisher successfully trialled as an umpire during the 2013 NAB Cup. During the 2025 AFL season Fisher umpired his 250th game.
