= Jarrad Jansen =

Australian rules footballer

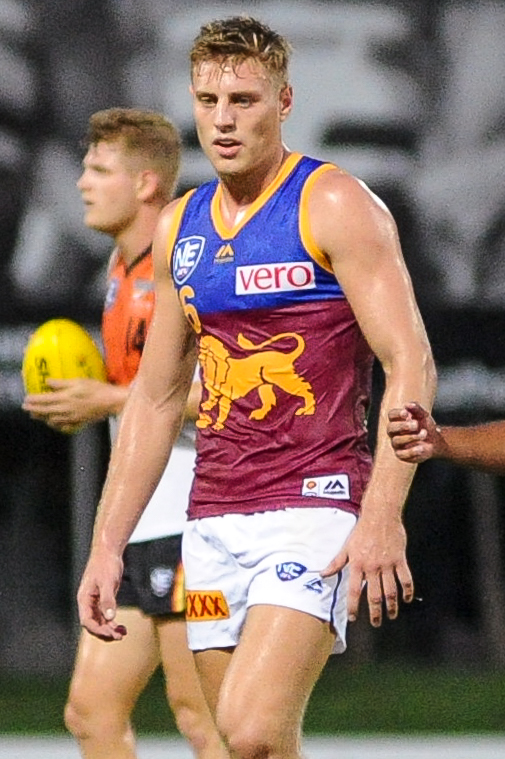
- Jansen in April 2017

Personal information
- Full name: Jarrad Jansen
- Nicknames: JJ, Jano
- Born: 2 May 1995 (age 31)
- Original team: East Fremantle Bullcreek Leeming Junior Football Club
- Draft: No. 36, 2013 AFL national draft
- Height: 192 cm (6 ft 4 in)
- Weight: 94 kg (207 lb)
- Position: Midfield / forward

Club information
- Current club: East Fremantle
- Number: 24

Playing career^{1}
Years	Club	Games (Goals)
2014–2015	Geelong	0 (0)
2016–2017	Brisbane Lions	8 (4)
2018–	East Fremantle	149 (70)
- ^{1} Playing statistics correct to the end of round 19, 2026.

Career highlights
- WAFL premiership player: 2023

Jarrad Jansen (born 2 May 1995) is a former professional Australian rules footballer who played for the Brisbane Lions and was listed on the Geelong Football Club squad in the Australian Football League (AFL).

== AFL career ==
=== Geelong (2014–2015) ===
Jansen was drafted in the 2013 AFL draft by Geelong, but he didn't play a game in the two seasons he spent there. He was drafted as a strong-bodied inside midfielder with the ability to go forwards, and spent his entire time with the club playing in the VFL. He lost weight in his time at the club to help him cover the ground more easily, but he was unable to force his way into the star-studded Geelong midfield.

=== Brisbane Lions (2016–2017) ===
Jansen was traded to the Brisbane Lions for the 2016 season. He played his first game in round 11 of the 2016 season against Carlton and played seven games for the season, struggling for consistency. He was delisted by Brisbane at the conclusion of the 2017 season after playing just eight AFL games.

== Statistics ==
Statistics are correct to the end of the 2017 season

Legend
G	Goals	K	Kicks	D	Disposals	T	Tackles
B	Behinds	H	Handballs	M	Marks

Season	Team	No.	Games	Totals							Averages (per game)						
Season	Team	No.	Games	G	B	K	H	D	M	T	G	B	K	H	D	M	T
2014	Geelong	35	—	—	—	—	—	—	—	—	—	—	—	—	—	—	—
2015	Geelong	35	—	—	—	—	—	—	—	—	—	—	—	—	—	—	—
2016	Brisbane Lions	16	7	4	1	33	68	101	15	27	0.6	0.1	4.7	9.7	14.4	2.1	3.9
2017	Brisbane Lions	16	1	0	0	7	4	11	5	1	0.0	0.0	7.0	4.0	11.0	5.0	1.0
Career			8	4	1	40	72	112	20	28	0.5	0.1	5.0	9.0	14.0	2.5	3.5
