= Rhys Mathieson =

Australian rules footballer

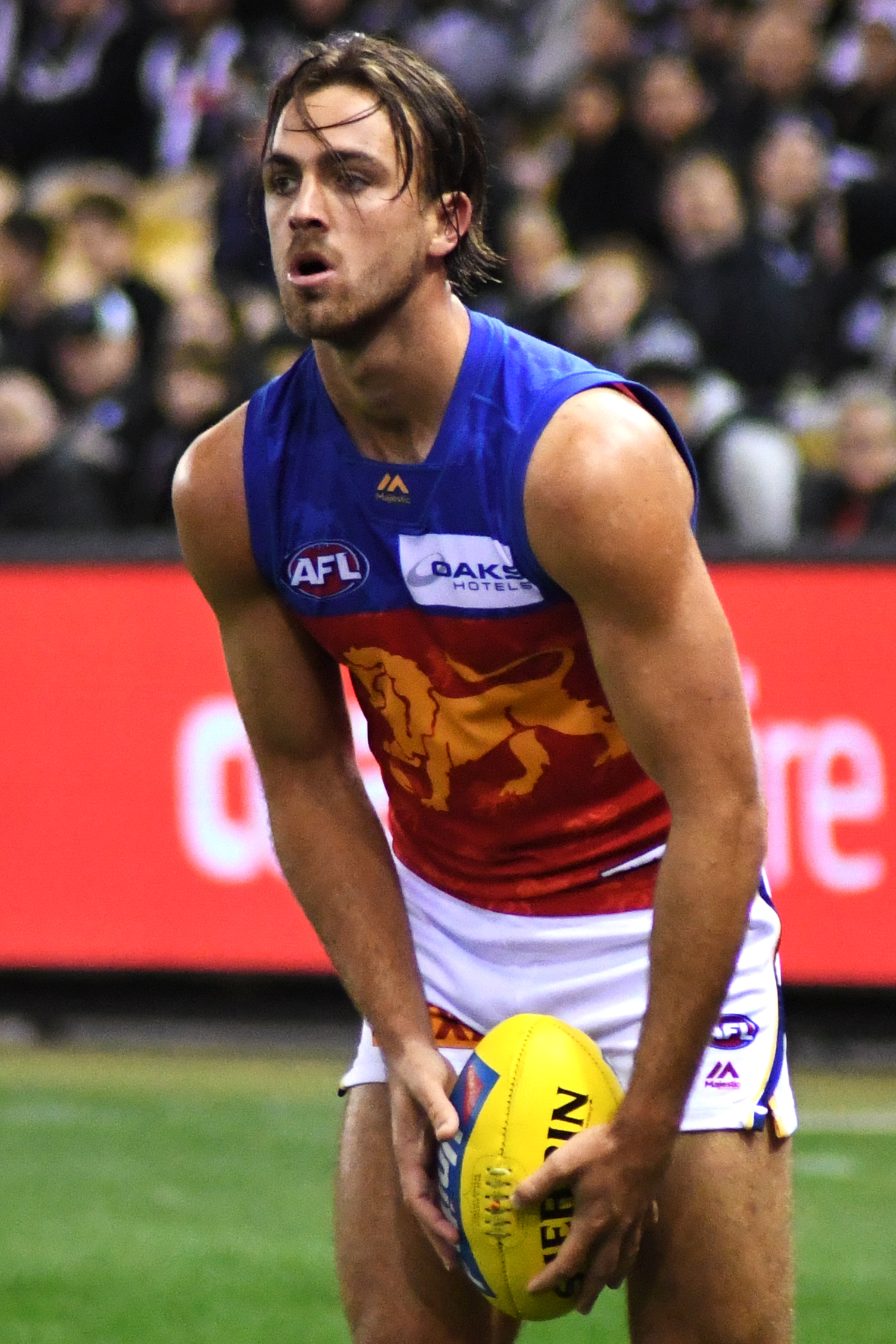
- Mathieson in August 2018

Personal information
- Full name: Rhys Mathieson
- Nicknames: Beast Mode, the Barometer
- Born: 10 January 1997 (age 29); Lara, Victoria
- Original team: Geelong Falcons (TAC Cup)
- Draft: No. 39, 2015 national draft
- Height: 186 cm (6 ft 1 in)
- Weight: 87 kg (192 lb)
- Position: Midfielder

Playing career^{1}
Years	Club	Games (Goals)
2016–2023	Brisbane Lions	72 (29)
- ^{1} Playing statistics correct to the end of the 2022 season.

Rhys Mathieson (born 10 January 1997) is a former professional Australian rules footballer who played for the Brisbane Lions in the Australian Football League (AFL). At 1.87 metres (6 ft 2 in) tall and weighing 84 kilograms (185 lb), he plays as a midfielder and is known for his ability to win contested ball. On 20 October 2023 he was delisted by the Brisbane Lions.

== AFL career ==
He was recruited by the Brisbane Lions with the 39th selection in the 2015 national draft. He played his first senior game in round 9 of the 2016 season against Melbourne. In his time at the Lions he has been known for his on-field antics, in particular his goal celebrations. Upon kicking his first AFL goal, Rhys celebrated with a 'shotgun' move made famous by Hawthorn's Mark Williams and faced some criticism for this showboating, while the Lions were losing to Greater Western Sydney in round 17, 2016.

After his delisting, Mathieson joined Brisbane-based QAFL side Wilston Grange. Mathieson also took up Bodybuilding, and took on a heavy supplement program to build muscle. Mathieson's body transformation led to suspicion from anti-doping authorities, and Mathieson was target-tested at the local sporting level. Mathieson tested positive for Oxymetholone and was suspended from football for 3 years, despite no longer playing professionally. Mathieson admitted he was more worried about his new bodybuilding hobby, and knew the risk he was taking with regards to his local footy career.

== Statistics ==
Updated to the end of the 2022 season.

Legend
G	Goals	K	Kicks	D	Disposals	T	Tackles
B	Behinds	H	Handballs	M	Marks

Season	Team	No.	Games	Totals							Averages (per game)							Votes
Season	Team	No.	Games	G	B	K	H	D	M	T	G	B	K	H	D	M	T	Votes
2016	Brisbane Lions	36	11	8	3	100	101	201	26	41	0.7	0.3	9.1	9.2	18.3	2.4	3.7	0
2017	Brisbane Lions	36	13	8	1	106	130	236	44	47	0.6	0.1	8.2	10.0	18.2	3.4	3.6	0
2018	Brisbane Lions	36	13	4	2	87	124	211	39	39	0.3	0.2	6.7	9.5	16.2	3.0	3.0	0
2019	Brisbane Lions	36	9	4	3	69	68	137	23	28	0.4	0.3	7.8	7.7	15.5	2.5	3.1	0
2020 (Note: The 2020 season was played with 17 home-and-away matches per team (down from 22) and 16-minute quarters with time on (down from 20-minute quarters with time on) due to the impact of the COVID-19 pandemic.)	Brisbane Lions	36	1	0	0	8	6	14	5	0	0.0	0.0	8.0	6.0	14.0	5.0	0.0	0
2021	Brisbane Lions	36	15	2	2	84	85	169	36	39	0.1	0.1	5.6	5.7	11.3	2.4	2.6	0
2022	Brisbane Lions	36	10	3	4	73	74	147	25	25	0.3	0.4	7.3	7.4	14.7	2.5	2.5	2
Career			72	29	15	527	588	1115	198	221	0.4	0.2	7.3	8.2	15.5	2.8	3.1	2
