= Mitch Robinson =

Australian rules footballer (born 1989)

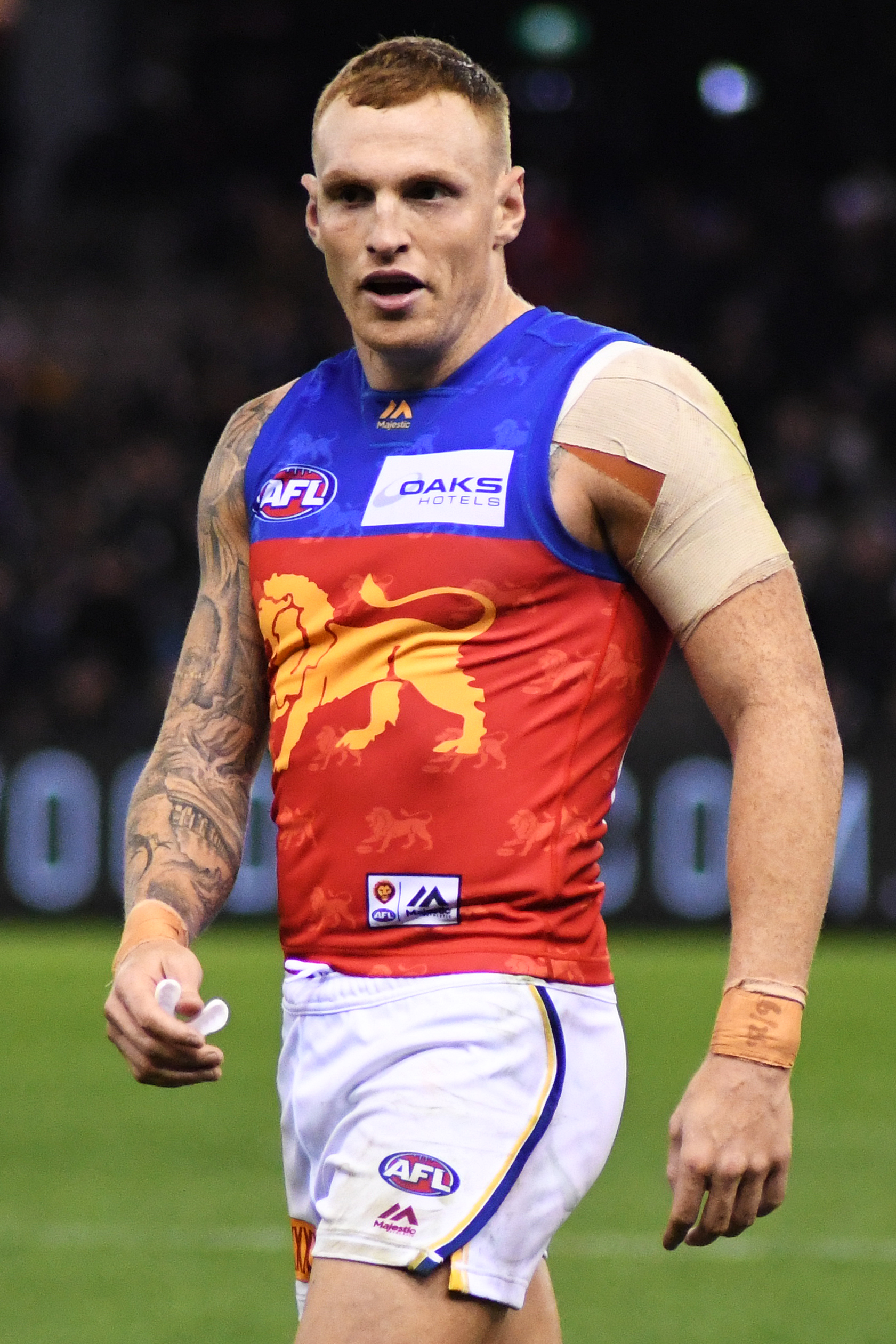
- Mitch Robinson

Personal information
- Full name: Mitchell Tim Robinson
- Born: 7 June 1989 (age 37); Hobart, Tasmania
- Original team: Tasmanian Devils (VFL)
- Draft: No. 40, 2008 National Draft, Carlton
- Height: 185 cm (6 ft 1 in)
- Weight: 89 kg (196 lb)
- Position: Midfielder

Club information
- Current club: Brisbane Lions
- Number: 5

Playing career^{1}
Years	Club	Games (Goals)
2009–2014	Carlton	100 (58)
2015–2022	Brisbane Lions	147 (71)
Total		247 (129)

International team honours^{2}
Years	Team	Games (Goals)
2011	Australia	2 (0)
- ^{1} Playing statistics correct to the end of 2022.^{2} Representative statistics correct as of 2011.

Career highlights
- Merrett–Murray Medallist: 2015; Marcus Ashcroft Medal (Round 6, 2019)

Mitch Robinson

Current team
- Team: Chiefs
- Game: Fortnite

Career information
- Playing career: 2018–present

Team history
- 2018–: Chiefs

Mitchell Robinson (born 7 June 1989) is a former professional Australian rules footballer who played for Brisbane Lions and Carlton in the Australian Football League (AFL). Robinson was named the Brisbane Lions club champion in 2015. In addition to his AFL career, he represented Australia in the 2011 International Rules Series. Robinson is also a professional Fortnite esports player, Twitch streamer and YouTuber.

== Early life ==
Robinson was born in Hobart, Tasmania. He played junior football in Tasmania. In 2008, he played eleven games for the Tasmanian Devils Football Club in the Victorian Football League, as well as two games for the Lauderdale Football Club seniors in the Southern Football League, and one game for the Tassie Mariners in the TAC Cup. He featured prominently at the AFL Under 18s Championship, winning Hunter-Harrison Medal as the best player in Division Two of the competition. He was drafted by the Carlton Football Club with its 3rd round selection (No. 40 overall) in the 2008 AFL National Draft.

== AFL career ==
=== Carlton ===
Robinson made his AFL debut in Round 1, 2009 against Richmond at the M.C.G., scoring three goals.

Robinson played sporadically in the AFL in his first two seasons, playing 26 of 46 possible games for Carlton and spending the rest of the time with VFL-affiliate Northern Bullants. His breakthrough came in the 2011 season, when he won a regular place in the team, and became a key ball-winner in the midfield; at midseason, Herald Sun commentator Mark Robinson heralded him as the league's most improved player. He went on to finish seventh in the John Nicholls Medal count for the season, and was selected to represent Australia in the 2011 International Rules Series.

Robinson quickly became popular with Carlton fans for his hardness at the ball – often in apparent disregard for his own safety, due to his shark-like tendencies to the point where his style is sometimes described as "kamikaze".

Robinson was involved in some off-field incidents during his time at Carlton. He was involved in a fight at the 2013 Big Day Out festival, and was fined $1,000 by the club as a result. Then in August 2014, Robinson suffered a fractured eye socket when he and Jeff Garlett became unwittingly involved in a brawl outside a nightspot at 5 a.m. on a Sunday morning; Robinson lied about the incident, telling the club he had sustained the injury in a boxing session at training, and he was fined $5,000 by the club.

Robinson was delisted by Carlton after the 2014 season, having played 100 games for Carlton, after lying about the incident with teammate Jeff Garlett.

=== Brisbane ===
In 2014 Robinson was signed as a delisted free agent by the Brisbane Lions. In 2015 he was the joint winner of the Merrett–Murray Medal as Brisbane's best and fairest, alongside Dayne Beams, Stefan Martin and Dayne Zorko.

Robinson announced his delisting from the Brisbane Lions on Instagram, following their 71-point loss to Geelong during the 2022 Preliminary Final. He officially retired a few days later.

== Statistics ==
Updated to the end of finals week 1, 2022.

Legend
G	Goals	K	Kicks	D	Disposals	T	Tackles
B	Behinds	H	Handballs	M	Marks

Season	Team	No.	Games	Totals							Averages (per game)							Votes
Season	Team	No.	Games	G	B	K	H	D	M	T	G	B	K	H	D	M	T	Votes
2009	Carlton	12	10	5	5	71	54	125	41	28	0.5	0.5	7.1	5.4	12.5	4.1	2.8	0
2010	Carlton	12	16	14	4	133	109	242	51	67	0.9	0.3	8.3	6.8	15.3	3.2	4.2	0
2011	Carlton	12	23	10	21	304	213	517	121	97	0.4	0.9	13.2	9.3	22.5	5.3	4.2	9
2012	Carlton	12	18	12	10	213	166	379	94	93	0.7	0.6	11.8	9.2	21.1	5.2	5.2	6
2013	Carlton	12	21	11	12	237	170	407	64	82	0.5	0.6	11.3	8.1	19.4	3.0	3.9	2
2014	Carlton	12	12	6	5	124	115	239	56	49	0.5	0.4	10.3	9.6	19.9	4.7	4.1	1
2015	Brisbane Lions	5	21	10	7	220	217	437	81	142	0.5	0.3	10.5	10.3	20.8	3.9	6.8	3
2016	Brisbane Lions	5	21	3	3	220	241	461	59	128	0.1	0.2	10.5	11.5	22.0	2.8	6.1	3
2017	Brisbane Lions	5	7	9	2	68	69	137	27	29	1.3	0.3	9.7	9.9	19.6	3.9	4.1	0
2018	Brisbane Lions	5	19	11	7	199	201	400	78	103	0.6	0.4	10.5	10.6	21.1	4.1	5.4	1
2019	Brisbane Lions	5	23	17	12	347	148	495	121	99	0.7	0.5	15.1	6.4	21.5	5.3	4.3	5
2020 (Note: The 2020 season was played with 17 home-and-away matches per team (down from 22) and 16-minute quarters with time on (down from 20-minute quarters with time on) due to the impact of the COVID-19 pandemic.)	Brisbane Lions	5	19	5	3	182	79	261	66	44	0.3	0.2	9.6	4.2	13.7	3.5	2.3	1
2021	Brisbane Lions	5	22	7	7	297	133	430	98	64	0.3	0.3	13.5	6.0	19.5	4.5	2.9	3
2022	Brisbane Lions	5	15	9	2	121	67	188	41	26	0.6	0.1	8.1	4.5	12.5	2.7	1.7	
Career			247	129	101	2736	1982	4718	998	1051	0.5	0.4	11.1	8.0	19.1	4.0	4.3	34

== Other media ==
Mitch Robinson

Twitch information
- Channel: MitchRobinson
- Years active: 2018–present
- Genre: Gaming/Lifestyle
- Followers: 24.4k
- Last updated: 20 September 2021

Robinson signed with professional e-sports Fortnite team The Chiefs Esports Club on 4 December 2018.

Robinson hosted a 24-hour charity stream on Twitch playing Fortnite to raise money for the New South Wales Rural Fire Service with a goal of raising $5,000 on 4 January 2020. Over the course of the event, he raised $12,424.. He also has a YouTube Channel in which he posts vlogs about his life and the AFL.
