= Daniel McStay =

Australian rules footballer (born 1995)

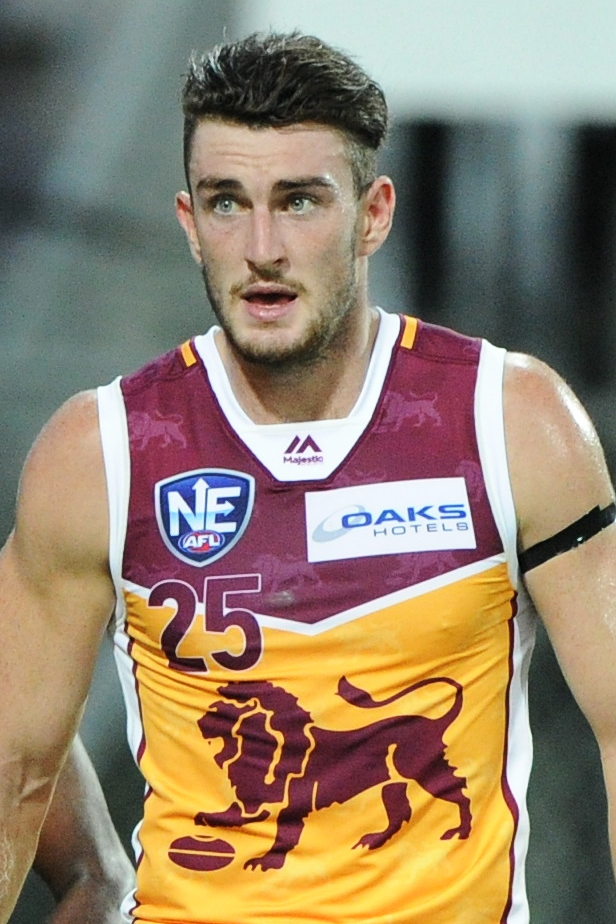
- McStay in April 2018

Personal information
- Full name: Daniel McStay
- Born: 24 June 1995 (age 31)
- Original team: Eastern Ranges (TAC Cup)
- Draft: No. 25, 2013 National Draft, Brisbane Lions
- Height: 196 cm (6 ft 5 in)
- Weight: 87 kg (192 lb)
- Position: Key forward

Club information
- Current club: Collingwood
- Number: 11

Playing career^{1}
Years	Club	Games (Goals)
2014–2022	Brisbane Lions	161 (138)
2023–	Collingwood	61 (94)
Total		222 (232)
- ^{1} Playing statistics correct to the end of the 2026 season.

Career highlights
- Collingwood leading goalkicker: 2026

Daniel McStay (born 24 June 1995) is an Australian rules footballer who plays for the Collingwood Football Club in the Australian Football League (AFL).

== Career ==
McStay was recruited from the Eastern Ranges in the TAC Cup with pick 25 in the 2013 AFL draft. McStay made his AFL debut against the North Melbourne Football Club in Round 15, 2014, playing at centre half-back.

In the dying moments of his first game, with the Lions leading by 4 points, McStay over-stepped the goal square when taking a kick-in from full-back resulting in a ball up in the Lions' defensive goal square. The Kangaroos failed to score from the stoppage and the Lions held on to win by 4 points in Jonathan Brown's farewell game.

After the completion of the 2022 AFL season, McStay wished to explore free agency and departed the Brisbane Lions after 9 years. Early in the trade period, he signed a five-year contract with Collingwood.

McStay injured his medial collateral ligament in Collingwood's 1-point win over GWS in the 2023 preliminary final. This resulted in him missing out on Collingwood's victory in that year's grand final.

McStay ruptured his left anterior cruciate ligament during training and was initially expected to miss the 2024 season. However, he made a quicker-than-expected recovery and played five games in the back end of the year for a return of eight goals.

== Statistics ==
Updated to the end of the 2026 season.

Legend
G	Goals	K	Kicks	D	Disposals	T	Tackles
B	Behinds	H	Handballs	M	Marks

Season	Team	No.	Games	Totals							Averages (per game)							Votes
Season	Team	No.	Games	G	B	K	H	D	M	T	G	B	K	H	D	M	T	Votes
2014	Brisbane Lions	25	9	7	0	50	57	107	42	10	0.8	0.0	5.6	6.3	11.9	4.7	1.1	0
2015	Brisbane Lions	25	20	19	10	91	72	163	72	26	1.0	0.5	4.6	3.6	8.2	3.6	1.3	0
2016	Brisbane Lions	25	12	4	0	66	72	138	46	24	0.3	0.0	5.5	6.0	11.5	3.8	2.0	0
2017	Brisbane Lions	25	19	1	1	119	103	222	95	33	0.1	0.1	6.3	5.4	11.7	5.0	1.7	0
2018	Brisbane Lions	25	19	22	18	106	66	172	81	42	1.2	0.9	5.6	3.5	9.1	4.3	2.2	0
2019	Brisbane Lions	25	24	21	16	120	122	242	100	49	0.9	0.7	5.0	5.1	10.1	4.2	2.0	0
2020 (Note: The 2020 season was played with 17 home-and-away matches per team (down from 22) and 16-minute quarters with time on (down from 20-minute quarters with time on) due to the impact of the COVID-19 pandemic.)	Brisbane Lions	25	17	11	6	80	44	124	54	27	0.6	0.4	4.7	2.6	7.3	3.2	1.6	0
2021	Brisbane Lions	25	19	28	10	120	71	191	88	58	1.5	0.5	6.3	3.7	10.1	4.6	3.1	2
2022	Brisbane Lions	25	22	25	12	162	102	264	116	40	1.1	0.5	7.4	4.6	12.0	5.3	1.8	2
2023	Collingwood	11	14	20	7	77	41	118	53	31	1.4	0.5	5.5	2.9	8.4	3.8	2.2	0
2024	Collingwood	11	5	8	4	33	16	49	26	5	1.6	0.8	6.6	3.2	9.8	5.2	1.0	0
2025	Collingwood	11	18	19	15	108	67	175	62	44	1.1	0.8	6.0	3.7	9.7	3.4	2.4	1
2026	Collingwood	11	24	47	15	141	101	242	99	73	2.0	0.6	5.9	4.2	10.1	4.1	3.0	3
Career			222	232	114	1274	934	2208	934	462	1.0	0.5	5.7	4.2	9.9	4.2	2.1	8
