= Lewis Taylor (Australian footballer) =

Australian rules footballer (born 1995)

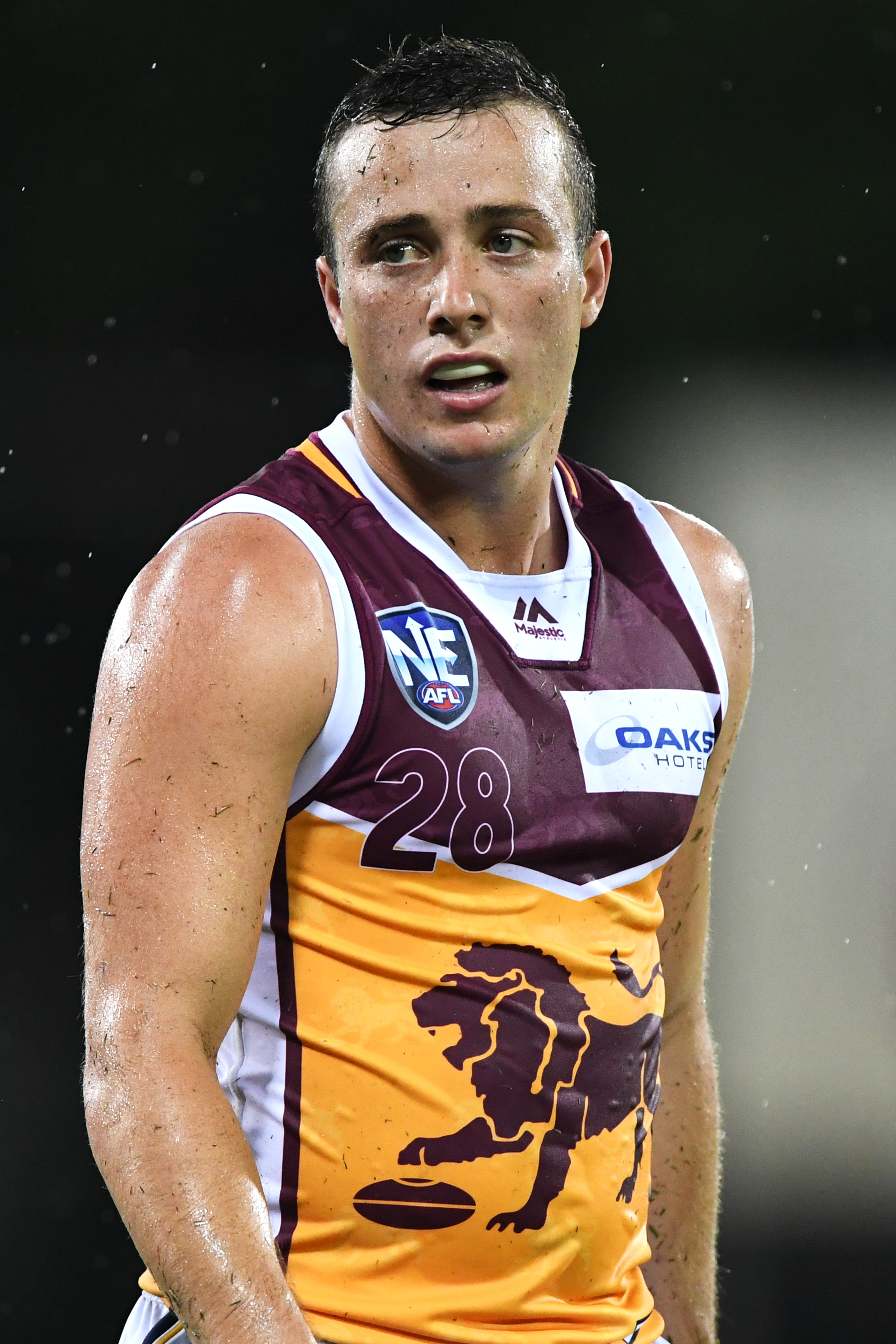
- Taylor in April 2019

Personal information
- Nickname: Squizzy
- Born: 17 February 1995 (age 31)
- Original team: Geelong Falcons (TAC Cup)
- Draft: No. 28, 2013 national draft
- Height: 173 cm (5 ft 8 in)
- Weight: 79 kg (174 lb)
- Position: Midfielder / Forward

Club information
- Current club: Sydney
- Number: 28

Playing career^{1}
| Years | Club | Games (Goals) |
| 2014–2019 | Brisbane Lions | 112 (88) |
| 2020–2022 | Sydney | 12 (6) |
| Total | | 124 (94) |
- ^{1} Playing statistics correct to the end of round 23, 2022.

Career highlights
- Ron Evans Medal: 2014

Lewis Taylor (born 17 February 1995) is a former Australian rules footballer who played for the Sydney Swans and the Brisbane Lions in the Australian Football League (AFL).

From Mortlake in Victoria, Taylor attended high school at Mercy Regional College, Camperdown. Taylor was drafted by the Lions with their fourth selection, pick 28, in the 2013 AFL draft. At only 173 cm, he drew comparisons with North Melbourne player Brent "Boomer" Harvey due to his ability to cut sides up throughout the middle of the ground with his pace and elite endurance.

Despite having an interrupted pre-season due to a foot injury, Taylor played all 22 games for Brisbane in his debut season. He was nominated for the AFL Rising Star in round 9 and at the end of season vote count he won the award, finishing one vote ahead of Marcus Bontempelli.

At the conclusion of the 2019 AFL season, Taylor was traded to Sydney in exchange for pick 48. Taylor played 12 games for Sydney before being delisted at the end of the 2022 season. Taylor subsequently announced his retirement.

== Statistics ==
Updated to the end of round 23, 2022.

Legend
| G | Goals | K | Kicks | D | Disposals | T | Tackles |
| B | Behinds | H | Handballs | M | Marks |

| Season | Team | No. | Games | Totals | | | | | | | Averages (per game) | | | | | | | Votes |
| Season | Team | No. | Games | G | B | K | H | D | M | T | G | B | K | H | D | M | T | Votes |
|---|---|---|---|---|---|---|---|---|---|---|---|---|---|---|---|---|---|---|
| 2014 | Brisbane Lions | 28 | 22 | 12 | 8 | 197 | 174 | 371 | 88 | 44 | 0.5 | 0.4 | 9.0 | 7.9 | 16.9 | 4.0 | 2.0 | 0 |
| 2015 | Brisbane Lions | 28 | 22 | 17 | 10 | 230 | 229 | 459 | 92 | 33 | 0.7 | 0.5 | 10.5 | 10.4 | 20.9 | 4.2 | 1.5 | 0 |
| 2016 | Brisbane Lions | 28 | 19 | 18 | 13 | 140 | 139 | 279 | 61 | 36 | 0.9 | 0.7 | 7.4 | 7.3 | 14.7 | 3.2 | 1.9 | 0 |
| 2017 | Brisbane Lions | 28 | 22 | 17 | 15 | 243 | 185 | 428 | 87 | 59 | 0.8 | 0.7 | 11.0 | 8.4 | 19.5 | 4.0 | 2.7 | 1 |
| 2018 | Brisbane Lions | 28 | 22 | 21 | 7 | 215 | 175 | 390 | 98 | 43 | 1.0 | 0.3 | 9.8 | 8.0 | 17.7 | 4.5 | 2.0 | 0 |
| 2019 | Brisbane Lions | 28 | 5 | 3 | 5 | 52 | 30 | 82 | 21 | 12 | 0.6 | 1.0 | 10.4 | 6.0 | 16.4 | 4.2 | 2.4 | 0 |
| 2020 (Note: The 2020 season was played with 17 home-and-away matches per team (down from 22) and 16-minute quarters with time on (down from 20-minute quarters with time on) due to the impact of the COVID-19 pandemic.) | Sydney | 28 | 9 | 6 | 5 | 51 | 27 | 78 | 22 | 20 | 0.7 | 0.6 | 5.7 | 3.0 | 8.7 | 2.4 | 2.2 | 0 |
| 2021 | Sydney | 28 | 2 | 0 | 1 | 6 | 0 | 6 | 4 | 1 | 0.0 | 0.5 | 3.0 | 0.0 | 3.0 | 2.0 | 0.5 | 0 |
| 2022 | Sydney | 28 | 1 | 0 | 0 | 0 | 0 | 0 | 0 | 0 | 0.0 | 0.0 | 0.0 | 0.0 | 0.0 | 0.0 | 0.0 | |
| Career | | | 124 | 94 | 64 | 1134 | 959 | 2093 | 473 | 248 | 0.8 | 0.5 | 9.1 | 7.7 | 16.9 | 3.8 | 2.0 | 1 |
