= Darcy Gardiner =

Australian rules footballer (born 1995)

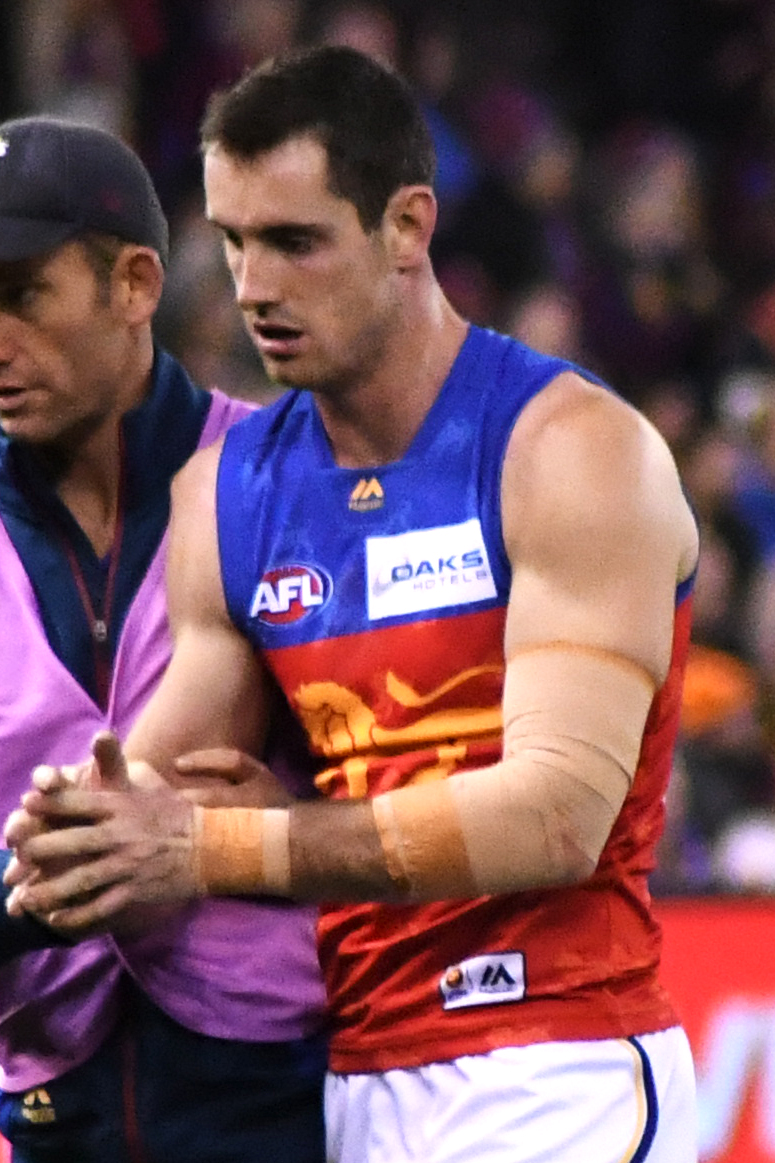
- Gardiner playing for the Brisbane Lions in 2018

Personal information
- Full name: Darcy Gardiner
- Nicknames: Dizzy, Dizz
- Born: 22 September 1995 (age 31); Queenscliff
- Original team: Geelong Falcons (TAC Cup)
- Draft: No. 22, 2013 national draft
- Height: 192 cm (6 ft 4 in)
- Weight: 92 kg (203 lb)
- Position: Key defender

Club information
- Current club: Brisbane Lions
- Number: 27

Playing career^{1}
Years	Club	Games (Goals)
2014–	Brisbane Lions	193 (14)
- ^{1} Playing statistics correct to the end of round 22, 2026.

Career highlights
- 2× AFL premiership player: 2025, 2026; Rising Star nominee: 2014; St Joseph’s College Team of Champions

Darcy Gardiner (born 22 September 1995) is an Australian rules footballer who plays for the Brisbane Lions in the Australian Football League (AFL).

== Early life ==
Gardiner played as a junior for the Queenscliff Coutas and attended St Joseph's College in Geelong. In 2020, he was named in the St Joseph's College Team of Champions, recognising the best VFL/AFL players to have attended the school.

== AFL career ==
The Lions drafted Gardiner with their second selection, pick 22, in the 2013 AFL draft. AFL National Talent Manager Kevin Sheehan described Gardiner as the best tall defender in his draft.

Gardiner was in the Lions team that lost the 2023 grand final to Collingwood but missed out on the 2024 premiership win over Sydney due to being sidelined following a knee reconstruction.

Gardiner was part of Brisbane's 2025 premiership side.

== Statistics ==
Updated to the end of round 22, 2026.

Legend
G	Goals	K	Kicks	D	Disposals	T	Tackles
B	Behinds	H	Handballs	M	Marks
#	Played in that season's premiership team

Season	Team	No.	Games	Totals							Averages (per game)							Votes
Season	Team	No.	Games	G	B	K	H	D	M	T	G	B	K	H	D	M	T	Votes
2014	Brisbane Lions	27	17	2	0	92	100	192	61	31	0.1	0.0	5.4	5.9	11.3	3.6	1.8	0
2015	Brisbane Lions	27	8	1	0	42	34	76	22	16	0.1	0.0	5.3	4.3	9.5	2.8	2.0	0
2016	Brisbane Lions	27	18	0	1	107	108	215	45	43	0.0	0.1	5.9	6.0	11.9	2.5	2.4	0
2017	Brisbane Lions	27	19	1	1	134	110	244	89	44	0.1	0.1	7.1	5.8	12.8	4.7	2.3	0
2018	Brisbane Lions	27	20	0	0	172	126	298	113	39	0.0	0.0	8.6	6.3	14.9	5.7	2.0	0
2019	Brisbane Lions	27	24	1	0	239	87	326	112	53	0.0	0.0	10.0	3.6	13.6	4.7	2.2	0
2020 (Note: The 2020 season was played with 17 home-and-away matches per team (down from 22) and 16-minute quarters with time on (down from 20-minute quarters with time on) due to the impact of the COVID-19 pandemic.)	Brisbane Lions	27	18	0	0	139	60	199	71	25	0.0	0.0	7.7	3.3	11.1	3.9	1.4	0
2021	Brisbane Lions	27	9	0	0	61	38	99	34	4	0.0	0.0	6.8	4.2	11.0	3.8	0.4	0
2022	Brisbane Lions	27	21	0	0	168	93	261	100	32	0.0	0.0	8.0	4.4	12.4	4.8	1.5	0
2023	Brisbane Lions	27	4	0	0	22	12	34	12	10	0.0	0.0	5.5	3.0	8.5	3.0	2.5	0
2024	Brisbane Lions	27	7	3	2	36	21	57	18	13	0.4	0.3	5.1	3.0	8.1	2.6	1.9	0
2025^{#}	Brisbane Lions	27	18	6	3	124	63	187	78	25	0.3	0.2	6.9	3.5	10.4	4.3	1.4	0
2026^{#}	Brisbane Lions	27	10	0	0	72	40	112	52	8	0.0	0.0	7.2	4.0	11.2	5.2	0.8	0
Career			193	14	7	1408	892	2300	807	343	0.1	0.0	7.3	4.6	11.9	4.2	1.8	0

== Honours and achievements ==
Individual

- AFL Rising Star nominee: 2014 (round 19)
