= Nick Robertson (footballer) =

Australian rules football player (born 1995)

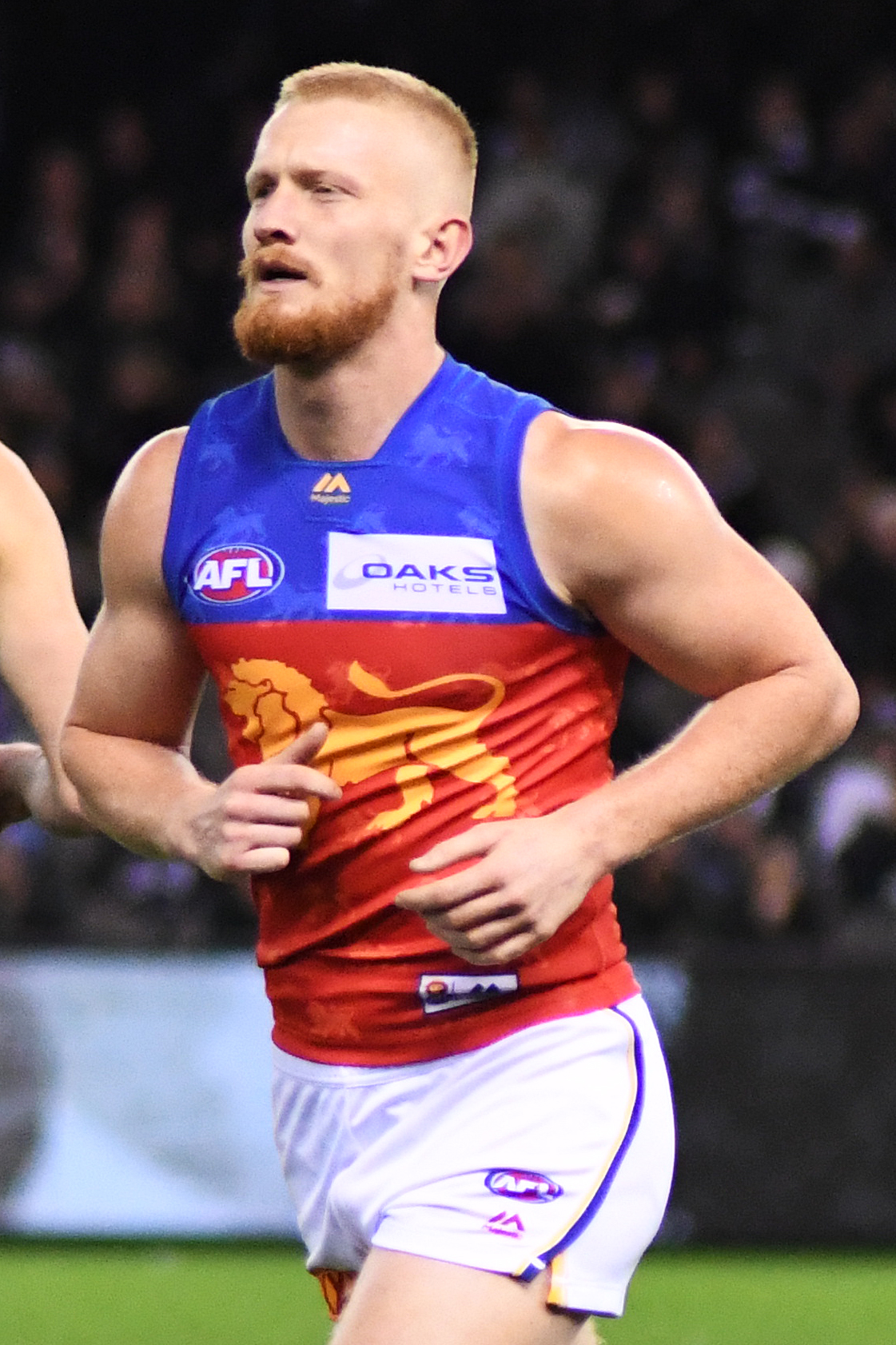
- Robertson in August 2018

Personal information
- Full name: Nick Robertson
- Nicknames: Rob, Robbo
- Born: 3 June 1995 (age 31)
- Original team: West Perth
- Draft: No. 34, 2013 National Draft, Brisbane Lions
- Height: 190 cm (6 ft 3 in)
- Weight: 87 kg (192 lb)
- Position: Midfield

Club information
- Current club: Brisbane Lions
- Number: 18

Playing career^{1}
Years	Club	Games (Goals)
2014–2019	Brisbane Lions	73 (10)
- ^{1} Playing statistics correct to the end of 2019.

Nick Robertson (born 3 June 1995) is an Australian rules football player. Between 2014 and 2019, he played for the Brisbane Lions in the Australian Football League (AFL). Robertson was drafted by the Lions with pick 34 in the 2013 AFL draft. He made his debut against Port Adelaide in round 4 of the 2014 season. In October 2019, the Lions informed Robertson that he would not be offered a contract for the 2020 AFL season. Robertson is playing for East Perth in the 2022 WAFL season.
