= Tom Cutler =

Australian rules footballer

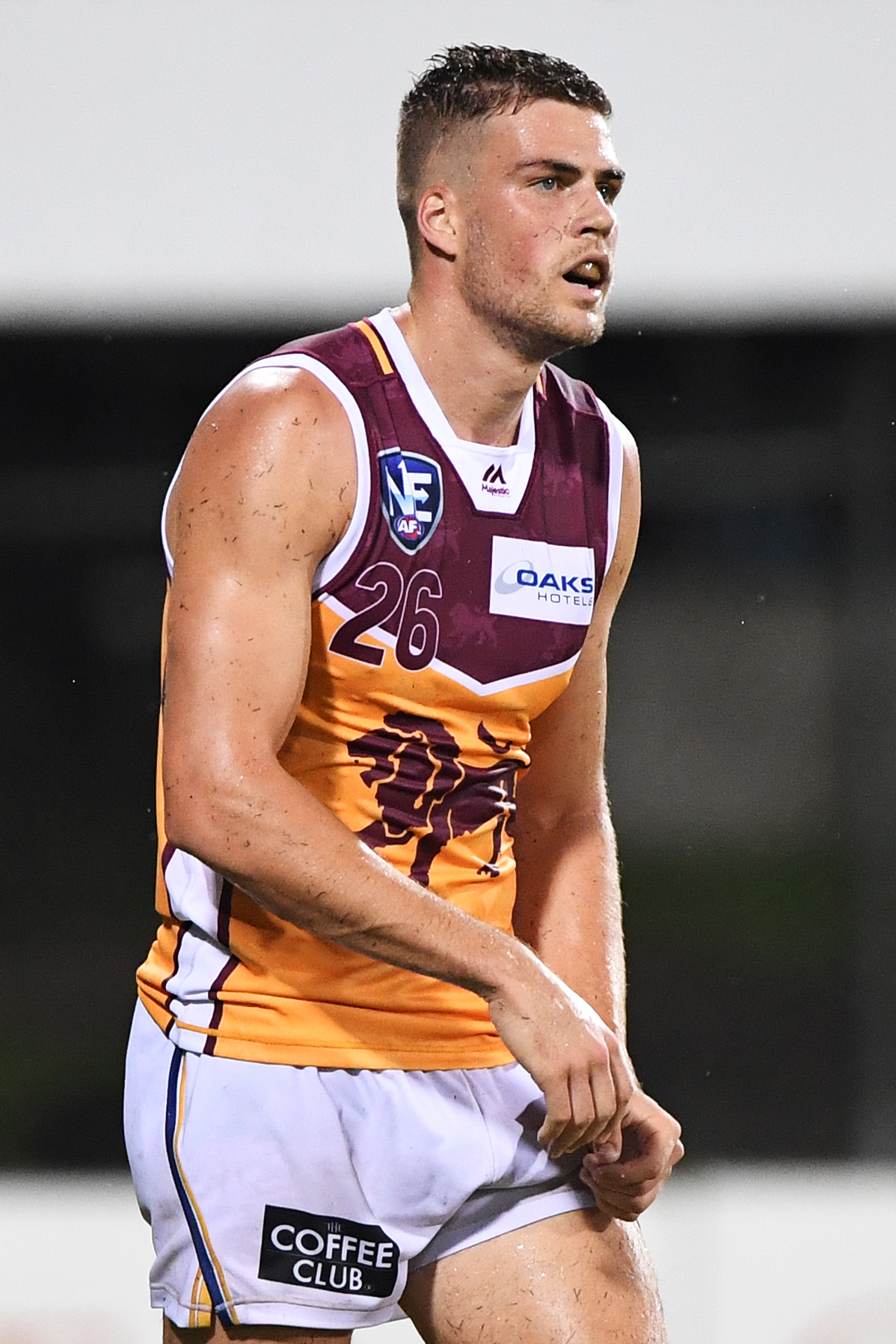
- Cutler in April 2019

Personal information
- Full name: Tom Cutler
- Born: 20 February 1995 (age 31)
- Original team: Oakleigh Chargers (TAC Cup)
- Draft: No. 33, 2013 national draft
- Height: 192 cm (6 ft 4 in)
- Weight: 100 kg (220 lb)
- Position: Defender

Club information
- Current club: Essendon
- Number: 12

Playing career^{1}
Years	Club	Games (Goals)
2014–2019	Brisbane Lions	66 (32)
2020–2022	Essendon	30 (8)
Total		96 (40)
- ^{1} Playing statistics correct to the end of 2022 AFL Season.

Career highlights
- 2019 NEAFL premiership

Tom Cutler (born 20 February 1995) is a former professional Australian rules footballer who played for the Essendon Football Club in the Australian Football League (AFL) from 2020 to 2022. He previously played for the Brisbane Lions between 2014 and 2019.

== Early life ==
Cutler grew up in Balwyn, in the eastern suburbs of Melbourne, supporting the Brisbane Lions as a child. At the age of 16, he stopped playing club footy to concentrate on school football for Trinity Grammar, and to play basketball, at which he also excelled.

Cutler had an injury ridden 2013 with the Oakleigh Chargers, although when he was available he impressed recruiters with his elite decision-making and athleticism.

== AFL career ==
Cutler debuted in Round 4 of the 2014 AFL season against Port Adelaide at the Adelaide Oval. He went on to play 7 games for the year, including a 21 disposal effort against Richmond at the Gabba in Round 5. His first season was cut short due to injury, suffering from a groin injury and then having minor knee surgery.

At the conclusion of the 2019 AFL season, Cutler was traded to Essendon.

He was delisted by Essendon at the conclusion of the 2022 AFL season.

== Statistics ==
Statistics are correct to the end of Finals Week 1 2021

Legend
G	Goals	K	Kicks	D	Disposals	T	Tackles
B	Behinds	H	Handballs	M	Marks

Season	Team	No.	Games	Totals							Averages (per game)						
Season	Team	No.	Games	G	B	K	H	D	M	T	G	B	K	H	D	M	T
2014	Brisbane Lions	26	7	2	0	55	27	82	24	6	0.3	0.0	7.9	3.9	11.7	3.4	0.9
2015	Brisbane Lions	26	11	1	2	106	73	179	38	14	0.1	0.2	9.6	6.6	16.3	3.5	1.3
2016	Brisbane Lions	26	15	9	6	176	101	277	53	35	0.6	0.4	11.7	6.7	18.5	3.5	2.3
2017	Brisbane Lions	26	12	8	6	148	83	231	66	16	0.7	0.5	12.3	6.9	19.3	5.5	1.3
2018	Brisbane Lions	26	18	11	15	251	117	368	117	35	0.6	0.8	13.9	6.5	20.4	6.5	1.9
2019	Brisbane Lions	26	3	1	2	40	25	65	15	6	0.3	0.7	13.3	8.3	21.7	5.0	2.0
2020	Essendon	12	8	2	5	66	44	110	25	10	0.3	0.6	8.3	5.5	13.6	3.1	1.3
2021	Essendon	12	13	1	4	113	65	178	51	16	0.0	0.3	8.6	5.0	13.6	3.9	1.2
Career			87	35	40	955	535	1490	389	138	0.4	0.4	10.9	6.1	17.1	4.4	1.5
