= Brisbane Lions drafting and trading history =

The Brisbane Lions' drafting and trading history has lasted almost as long as the club's existence, with the club first drafting in 1996 and first trading in 1997. The club was founded in 1996 following a merger between the Fitzroy Football Club and the Brisbane Bears. This page does not include any drafts or trades performed by those two clubs. It includes drafts and trades from both the Australian Football League and the AFL Women's.

== AFL ==
=== 1996/97 off-season ===
==== Players from the Brisbane Bears and Fitzroy Football Club ====
After the merger between the Bears and Fitzroy, the Brisbane Lions received a number of players from each club. These players formed most of the Lions' inaugural squad.

===== Players from the Brisbane Bears =====
1. Jason Akermanis
2. Marcus Ashcroft
3. Trent Bartlett
4. Andrew Bews
5. Daniel Bradshaw
6. Richard Champion
7. Nathan Chapman
8. Matthew Clarke
9. Danny Dickfos
10. Adrian Fletcher
11. Andrew Gowers
12. Andrew Gowling
13. Brent Green
14. Shaun Hart
15. Clark Keating
16. Matthew Kennedy
17. Craig Lambert
18. Nigel Lappin
19. Steven Lawrence
20. Justin Leppitsch
21. Alastair Lynch
22. Tristan Lynch
23. Scott McIvor
24. Michael McLean
25. Craig McRae
26. Ben Robbins
27. Chris Scott
28. Dion Scott
29. Nick Trask
30. Brett Voss
31. Michael Voss
32. Darryl White
33. Derek Wirth

===== Players from Fitzroy Football Club =====
1. Scott Bamford
2. John Barker
3. Brad Boyd
4. Nick Carter
5. Shane Clayton
6. Simon Hawking
7. Chris Johnson
8. Jarrod Molloy

==== Drafting ====
Draft	Pick	Name
1996 national draft	3	Rory Hilton
1996 national draft	26	Tim Notting

=== 1997/98 off-season ===
==== Drafting ====
Draft	Pick	Name
1997 national draft	5	Luke Power
1997 national draft	10	Shane O'Bree
1997 national draft	31	Simon Black
1997 national draft	51	Scott Ralph
1997 national draft	58	Marcus Picken
1997 national draft	73	Beau McDonald
1998 rookie draft	89	Tate Day

==== Trading ====
Club traded with	Player(s) and/or draft pick(s) in	Player(s) and/or draft pick(s) out
Fremantle	—	Adrian Fletcher
Melbourne	Pick 5	—
Hawthorn	Brad Scott; Pick 51	John Barker; Nathan Chapman; Pick 42
Sydney	Pick 31	Brent Green; Simon Hawking

=== 1998/99 off-season ===
==== Drafting ====
Draft	Pick	Name
1998 national draft	1	Des Headland
1998 national draft	33	Craig Bolton
1998 national draft	45	Aaron Shattock
1999 pre-season draft	1	David Calthorpe
1999 rookie draft	1	Shannon Rusca
1999 rookie draft	44	Jeff Cooper
1999 rookie draft	54	Trent Knobel
1999 rookie draft	59	Scott Ralph

==== Rookie elevation ====
1. Tate Day

==== Trading ====
Club traded with	Player(s) and/or draft pick(s) in	Player(s) and/or draft pick(s) out
Melbourne	Pick 45	Nick Carter
Port Adelaide	Adam Heuskes	Pick 5
Geelong	Martin McKinnon	Scott Bamford; Tristan Lynch; Pick 17; Pick 24

=== 1999/2000 off-season ===
==== Drafting ====
Draft	Pick	Name
1999 national draft	6	Damian Cupido
1999 national draft	30	Jonathan Brown (father–son)
1999 national draft	44	Shane Morrison (father–son)
2000 rookie draft	13	Ben Doherty
2000 rookie draft	29	Jason Anthonisz
2000 rookie draft	64	Nathan Clarke
2000 rookie draft	66	Jeff Cooper
2000 rookie draft	68	Stephen Kenna
2000 rookie draft	70	Hayden Kluver

==== Rookie elevation ====
1. Trent Knobel

==== Trading ====
Club traded with	Player(s) and/or draft pick(s) in	Player(s) and/or draft pick(s) out
Adelaide	Pick 6	Matthew Clarke
Sydney	Stefan Carey	Pick 21
Western Bulldogs	Michael Martin	Trent Bartlett; Pick 32

=== 2000/01 off-season ===
==== Drafting ====
Draft	Pick	Name
2000 national draft	13	Ashley McGrath
2000 national draft	22	Richard Hadley
2000 national draft	29	Jamie Charman
2000 national draft	33	Martin Pike
2000 national draft	59	Luke Hammond
2001 pre-season draft	9	Dylan McLaren
2001 rookie draft	12	David Mapleston
2001 rookie draft	63	Clint Alleway
2001 rookie draft	66	Robert Copeland
2001 rookie draft	67	Tom Tarrant
2001 rookie draft	68	Luke Weller

==== Rookie elevations ====
1. Nathan Clarke
2. Shannon Rusca

==== Trading ====
Club traded with	Player(s) and/or draft pick(s) in	Player(s) and/or draft pick(s) out
Collingwood	Mal Michael; Pick 22	Jarrod Molloy; Pick 44

=== 2001/02 off-season ===
==== Drafting ====
Draft	Pick	Name
2001 national draft	19	Jason Gram
2001 national draft	35	Jarrad Wright
2001 national draft	45	Nathan Clarke
2002 rookie draft	16	Darren Bradshaw
2002 rookie draft	65	David Mapleston
2002 rookie draft	66	Nick Raines
2002 rookie draft	67	Luke Weller

==== Rookie elevation ====
1. Robert Copeland

==== Trading ====
Club traded with	Player(s) and/or draft pick(s) in	Player(s) and/or draft pick(s) out
St Kilda	Pick 45	Trent Knobel; Pick 49
Western Bulldogs	Pick 49	Marcus Picken; Shannon Rusca

=== 2002/03 off-season ===
==== Drafting ====
Draft	Pick	Name
2002 national draft	3	Jared Brennan
2002 national draft	19	Troy Selwood
2002 national draft	30	Daniel Merrett
2002 national draft	44	Anthony Corrie
2003 rookie draft	16	Daniel Pratt
2003 rookie draft	32	Kevin Tandogac
2003 rookie draft	70	Joel Macdonald
2003 rookie draft	72	Paul Shelton
2003 rookie draft	74	Luke Weller

==== Trading ====
Club traded with	Player(s) and/or draft pick(s) in	Player(s) and/or draft pick(s) out
Essendon	Blake Caracella	Damian Cupido; Pick 15
Fremantle	Pick 3 Pick 19	Des Headland

=== 2003/04 off-season ===
==== Drafting ====
Draft	Pick	Name
2003 national draft	18	Llane Spaanderman
2003 national draft	23	Matthew Moody
2003 national draft	33	Jed Adcock
2003 national draft	49	Tom Logan
2003 national draft	61	Michael Rischitelli
2004 rookie draft	16	Daniel Pratt
2004 rookie draft	32	Matt Pardew
2004 rookie draft	47	Josh Drummond
2004 rookie draft	61	Jake Furfaro
2004 rookie draft	67	Leigh Ryswyk
2004 rookie draft	70	Jeremy Stiller

==== Rookie elevation ====
1. Joel Macdonald

==== Trading ====
Club traded with	Player(s) and/or draft pick(s) in	Player(s) and/or draft pick(s) out
St Kilda	Pick 23	Jason Gram

=== 2004/05 off-season ===
==== Drafting ====
Draft	Pick	Name
2004 national draft	18	Cameron Wood
2004 national draft	27	Pat Garner
2004 national draft	45	Justin Sherman
2004 national draft	50	Jayden Attard
2004 national draft	64	Luke Forsyth
2005 rookie draft	15	Travis Baird
2005 rookie draft	60	Josh Drummond
2005 rookie draft	62	Marcus Allan
2005 rookie draft	64	Will Hamill
2005 rookie draft	65	Marty Pask
2005 rookie draft	66	Scott Harding

==== Rookie elevation ====
1. Leigh Ryswyk

==== Trading ====
Club traded with	Player(s) and/or draft pick(s) in	Player(s) and/or draft pick(s) out
Port Adelaide	Pick 27; Pick 45	Aaron Shattock; Pick 34

=== 2005/06 off-season ===
==== Drafting ====
Draft	Pick	Name
2005 national draft	9	Mitch Clark
2005 national draft	25	Wayde Mills
2005 national draft	41	Rhan Hooper
2005 national draft	56	Joel Patfull
2006 pre-season draft	6	Ben Fixter
2006 rookie draft	6	Jason Roe
2006 rookie draft	22	Leonard Clark
2006 rookie draft	37	Luke Forsyth
2006 rookie draft	49	Cheynee Stiller
2006 rookie draft	57	Colm Begley

==== Rookie elevation ====
1. Josh Drummond

=== 2006/07 off-season ===
==== Drafting ====
Draft	Pick	Name
2006 national draft	4	Matthew Leuenberger
2006 national draft	22	Albert Proud
2006 national draft	34	Chris Schmidt
2006 national draft	38	James Hawksley
2006 national draft	54	Matthew Tyler
2006 national draft	70	Sam Sheldon
2007 rookie draft	4	Anthony Corrie
2007 rookie draft	20	Scott Clouston
2007 rookie draft	35	Daniel Dzufer
2007 rookie draft	48	Haydn Kiel
2007 rookie draft	57	Joel Tippett
2007 rookie draft	61	Will Hamill

==== Rookie elevations ====
1. Marcus Allan
2. Scott Harding
3. Jason Roe
4. Cheynee Stiller

==== Trading ====
Club traded with	Player(s) and/or draft pick(s) in	Player(s) and/or draft pick(s) out
Western Bulldogs	Pick 34	Jason Akermanis

=== 2007/08 off-season ===
==== Drafting ====
Draft	Pick	Name
2007 national draft	8	Lachie Henderson
2007 national draft	25	Tom Collier
2007 national draft	41	James Polkinghorne
2007 national draft	52	Bradd Dalziell
2007 national draft	56	Matt Austin
2008 rookie draft	7	Phil Smith
2008 rookie draft	23	Pat Garner
2008 rookie draft	38	Pearce Hanley

==== Rookie elevation ====
1. Anthony Corrie

==== Trading ====
Club traded with	Player(s) and/or draft pick(s) in	Player(s) and/or draft pick(s) out
Collingwood	Pick 14	Cameron Wood
Melbourne	Travis Johnstone	Pick 14
Carlton	Pick 52	Richard Hadley

=== 2008/09 off-season ===
==== Drafting ====
Draft	Pick	Name
2008 national draft	7	Daniel Rich
2008 national draft	25	Jack Redden
2008 national draft	41	Todd Banfield
2008 national draft	57	Aaron Cornelius
2008 national draft	69	Bart McCulloch
2008 national draft	81	Kieran King
2009 pre-season draft	5	Tom Rockliff
2009 rookie draft	7	Daniel Murray
2009 rookie draft	66	Adam Spackman
2009 rookie draft	76	Daniel Dzufer
2009 rookie draft	80	Joel Tippett

==== Rookie elevation ====
1. Scott Clouston

==== Trading ====
Club traded with	Player(s) and/or draft pick(s) in	Player(s) and/or draft pick(s) out
Collingwood	Pick 93 (pre-season draft pick 5)	Anthony Corrie

=== 2009/10 off-season ===
==== Drafting ====
Draft	Pick	Name
2009 national draft	27	Callum Bartlett
2009 national draft	47	Ryan Harwood
2009 national draft	73	Jesse O'Brien
2009 national draft	81	Bryce Retzlaff
2009 national draft	91	Matt Maguire
2009 national draft	93	Pearce Hanley (rookie elevation)
2010 rookie draft	16	Mitch Golby
2010 rookie draft	32	Josh Dyson
2010 rookie draft	67	Niall McKeever
2010 rookie draft	74	Sean Yoshiura
2010 rookie draft	76	Claye Beams
2010 rookie draft	78	Broc McCauley

==== Trading ====
Club traded with	Player(s) and/or draft pick(s) in	Player(s) and/or draft pick(s) out
Carlton	Brendan Fevola; Pick 27	Lachie Henderson; Pick 12
Richmond	Andrew Raines	Pick 44
St Kilda	Xavier Clarke	Pick 60
West Coast	Brent Staker; Pick 39	Bradd Dalziell
Sydney	Amon Buchanan	Pick 28
Sydney	Pick 47	Pick 39

=== 2010/11 off-season ===
==== Drafting ====
Draft	Pick	Name
2010 national draft	5	Jared Polec
2010 national draft	25	Patrick Karnezis
2010 national draft	28	Ryan Lester
2010 national draft	32	Josh Green
2010 national draft	65	Claye Beams (rookie elevation)
2011 rookie draft	13	Brad Harvey
2011 rookie draft	30	Bart McCulloch
2011 rookie draft	47	Albert Proud
2011 rookie draft	62	Broc McCauley

==== Trading ====
Club traded with	Player(s) and/or draft pick(s) in	Player(s) and/or draft pick(s) out
Gold Coast	Rohan Bewick; Pick 5 Pick 25; Pick 27	Pick 10; End of first round compensation pick (Jared Brennan, 2016 pick 21); Pick 49
Western Bulldogs	End of first round compensation pick (Jarrod Harbrow, 2011 pick 30)	Justin Sherman

==== Gold Coast uncontracted player signings ====
Upon the Gold Coast Football Club's entry into the AFL, the new club was allowed to sign one uncontracted player from each club in the league, and more with permission from a player's club.

Player	Permission required?	Compensation
Michael Rischitelli	No	End of first round (2012 pick 24)
Jared Brennan	Yes	End of first round (2016 pick 21)

=== 2011/12 off-season ===
==== Drafting ====
Draft	Pick	Name
2011 national draft	8	Billy Longer
2011 national draft	12	Sam Docherty
2011 national draft	30	Elliot Yeo
2011 national draft	47	Patrick Wearden
2011 national draft	69	Mitch Golby (rookie elevation)
2012 rookie draft	4	Justin Clarke
2012 rookie draft	22	Stephen Wrigley
2012 rookie draft	40	Jack Crisp
2012 rookie draft	57	Richard Newell (NSW scholarship)
2012 rookie draft	96	Sam Michael (Qld priority)

==== Trading ====
Club traded with	Player(s) and/or draft pick(s) in	Player(s) and/or draft pick(s) out
Western Bulldogs	Ben Hudson	Pick 70
Hawthorn	Jordan Lisle	Pick 29
Gold Coast	Dayne Zorko; Pick 47	Pick 34
Melbourne	—	Pick 52
Melbourne	Pick 12	Mitch Clark
Greater Western Sydney	Pick 69	Luke Power

=== 2012/13 off-season ===
==== Drafting ====
Draft	Pick	Name
2012 national draft	8	Sam Mayes
2012 national draft	23	Marco Paparone
2012 national draft	32	Michael Close
2012 national draft	86	Jack Crisp (rookie elevation)
2012 national draft	99	Niall McKeever (rookie elevation)
2013 rookie draft	6	Nick Hayes
2013 rookie draft	21	Callum Bartlett
2013 rookie draft	63	Jordan Bourke (academy pre-selection)

==== Trading ====
Club traded with	Player(s) and/or draft pick(s) in	Player(s) and/or draft pick(s) out
Melbourne	Stefan Martin	Pick 52; Pick 71

==== Free agency ====
In/out	Club	Player	Type	Compensation
In	Melbourne	Brent Moloney	Restricted	Third round (pick 49) (Note: Pick 49 was allocated to Melbourne as a combined compensation for Moloney and fellow free agent Jared Rivers, the latter of whom signed for Geelong.)

=== 2013/14 off-season ===
==== Drafting ====
Draft	Pick	Name
2013 national draft	7	James Aish
2013 national draft	22	Darcy Gardiner
2013 national draft	25	Daniel McStay
2013 national draft	28	Lewis Taylor
2013 national draft	33	Tom Cutler
2013 national draft	34	Nick Robertson
2013 national draft	62	Jonathan Freeman (academy bidding selection)
2013 national draft	75	Justin Clarke (rookie elevation)
2014 rookie draft	6	Isaac Conway
2014 rookie draft	23	Zac O'Brien
2014 rookie draft	69	Archie Smith (academy pre-selection)

==== Trading ====
Club traded with	Player(s) and/or draft pick(s) in	Player(s) and/or draft pick(s) out
Collingwood	Jackson Paine	Patrick Karnezis
Geelong	Trent West	Pick 41
Carlton	Pick 33	Sam Docherty
West Coast	Pick 28	Elliot Yeo
Port Adelaide	Pick 34	Jared Polec; Pick 45
Greater Western Sydney	Pick 22; Pick 48	Pick 29
St Kilda	Pick 25; Pick 41	Billy Longer; Pick 48

==== Free agency ====
In/out	Club	Player	Type	Compensation
In	Richmond	Luke McGuane	Delisted	None

=== 2014/15 off-season ===
==== Drafting ====
Draft	Pick	Name
2014 national draft	44	Liam Dawson (academy bidding selection)
2014 national draft	61	Harris Andrews (academy bidding selection)
2014 national draft	65	Josh Watts
2014 national draft	73	Jaden McGrath
2014 national draft	81	Josh McGuinness
2014 national draft	86	Josh Clayton (father–son)
2015 rookie draft	4	Billy Evans
2015 rookie draft	22	Hugh Beasley
2015 rookie draft	56	Cian Hanley
2015 rookie draft	75	Matthew Hammelmann (academy pre-selection)

==== Trading ====
Club traded with	Player(s) and/or draft pick(s) in	Player(s) and/or draft pick(s) out
Greater Western Sydney	Pick 21	Joel Patfull
Geelong	Allen Christensen	Pick 21
Collingwood	Dayne Beams; Pick 67	Jack Crisp; Pick 5 Pick 25

==== Free agency ====
In/out	Club	Player	Type	Compensation
In	Carlton	Mitch Robinson	Delisted	None

=== 2015/16 off-season ===
==== Drafting ====
Draft	Pick	Name
2015 national draft	2	Josh Schache
2015 national draft	14	Eric Hipwood (academy bidding selection)
2015 national draft	24	Ben Keays (academy bidding selection)
2015 national draft	39	Rhys Mathieson
2015 national draft	47	Sam Skinner
2016 rookie draft	2	Jackson Paine
2016 rookie draft	20	Reuben William

==== Trading ====
Club traded with	Player(s) and/or draft pick(s) in	Player(s) and/or draft pick(s) out
West Coast	Pick 17	Jack Redden
Carlton	Tom Bell; Pick 41	Pick 21; Pick 60
Geelong	Josh Walker; Jarrad Jansen	Brisbane Lions 2016 third-round pick (pick 42)
Collingwood	St Kilda 2016 second-round pick (pick 31)	James Aish
North Melbourne	Ryan Bastinac; Pick 38; Pick 40; North Melbourne 2016 third-round pick (pick 51)	Pick 17

==== Free agency ====
In/out	Club	Player	Type	Compensation
Out	Essendon	Matthew Leuenberger	Restricted	End of second round (pick 39)

=== 2016/17 off-season ===
==== Drafting ====
Draft	Pick	Name
2016 national draft	3	Hugh McCluggage
2016 national draft	17	Jarrod Berry
2016 national draft	23	Alex Witherden
2016 national draft	24	Cedric Cox
2016 national draft	55	Jacob Allison (academy bidding selection)
2016 national draft	71	Corey Lyons
2017 rookie draft	2	Jake Barrett
2017 rookie draft	20	Mitch Hinge
2017 rookie draft	37	Oscar McInerney

==== Category B rookie selections ====
Player	Reason for Category B eligibility
Matt Eagles	Winner of The Recruit
Blake Grewar	Qld zone selection

==== Rookie elevation ====
1. Archie Smith

==== Trading ====
Club traded with	Player(s) and/or draft pick(s) in	Player(s) and/or draft pick(s) out
Greater Western Sydney	Pick 3 Pick 16	Pick 2 Pick 31; Pick 51; Pick 60
Gold Coast	Pick 22	Pearce Hanley
Port Adelaide	Port Adelaide 2017 first-round pick (pick 12)	Pick 19
Collingwood	Jack Frost; Pick 76; Collingwood 2017 third-round pick (pick 43)	Brisbane Lions 2017 third-round pick (pick 38); Brisbane Lions 2017 fourth-round pick (pick 56)

==== Free agency ====
In/out	Club	Player	Type	Compensation
Out	Essendon	Josh Green	Delisted	None

=== 2017/18 off-season ===
==== Drafting ====
Draft	Pick	Name
2017 national draft	1	Cameron Rayner
2017 national draft	15	Zac Bailey
2017 national draft	18	Brandon Starcevich
2017 national draft	41	Toby Wooller
2017 national draft	43	Connor Ballenden (academy bidding selection)
2017 national draft	54	Jack Payne (academy bidding selection)
2018 rookie draft	1	Claye Beams

==== Category B rookie selection ====
Player	Reason for Category B eligibility
Cian Hanley	International selection (Ireland — Mayo U18/Brisbane Lions (Gaelic football/Australian rules football)) (Note: Hanley would not normally have been eligible to spend a fourth year as a Category B rookie for Brisbane, but the AFL allowed the Lions to retain him due to persistent injuries for his first two seasons on the list and the death of his brother, Tommy Hanley, which resulted in a break from football, in his third. Confirmation Hanley would remain with the Lions was announced on 27 November 2017 after he was overlooked by the other 17 AFL clubs.)

==== Trading ====
Club traded with	Player(s) and/or draft pick(s) in	Player(s) and/or draft pick(s) out
Hawthorn	Luke Hodge; Pick 44	Pick 43; Pick 75
Adelaide	Charlie Cameron	Pick 12
Western Bulldogs	Pick 25; Pick 40	Josh Schache
Richmond	Pick 15; Pick 52	Pick 20; Pick 25

==== Free agency ====
In/out	Club	Player	Type	Compensation
Out	Port Adelaide	Tom Rockliff	Restricted	End of first round (pick 18)

=== 2018/19 off-season ===
==== Drafting ====
Draft	Pick	Name
2018 national draft	21	Ely Smith
2018 national draft	36	Tom Berry
2018 national draft	40	Tom Joyce
2018 national draft	42	Connor McFayden (academy bidding selection)
2018 national draft	55	Noah Answerth
2019 rookie draft	4	Ryan Bastinac
2019 rookie draft	21	Jacob Allison

==== Category B rookie selections ====
Player	Reason for Category B eligibility
Tom Fullarton	Three-year non-registered player (Basketball — Brisbane Bullets)
James Madden	International selection (Ireland — Dublin GAA (Gaelic football/hurling))

==== Trading ====
Club traded with	Player(s) and/or draft pick(s) in	Player(s) and/or draft pick(s) out
Geelong	Lincoln McCarthy; Pick 54; Pick 57	Pick 42; Pick 60
Gold Coast	Pick 32; Pick 41; Pick 44; Pick 77	Pick 24; Pick 58; Pick 79
Hawthorn	Pick 35	—
Port Adelaide	Pick 6 Fremantle 2019 third-round pick	Sam Mayes; Pick 5
Gold Coast	Pick 19; Gold Coast 2019 second-round pick Hawthorn 2019 third-round pick	Brisbane Lions 2019 first-round pick
Fremantle	Lachie Neale; Pick 30	Pick 6 Pick 19; Pick 55
Western Bulldogs	Marcus Adams	Pick 32; Hawthorn 2019 third-round pick
Collingwood	Pick 18; Pick 56; Collingwood 2019 first-round pick	Dayne Beams; Pick 41; Pick 44

==== Free agency ====
In/out	Club	Player	Type	Compensation
In	Gold Coast	Jarryd Lyons	Delisted	None

== AFL Women's ==
=== 2016/17 off-season ===
==== Marquee player signings ====
1. Sabrina Frederick-Traub
2. Tayla Harris

==== Priority player signings ====
1. Kaitlyn Ashmore
2. Emma Zielke

==== Rookie player signings ====
Player	Reason for rookie eligibility
Kate Deegan	Other sport (Association football)
Delissa Kimmince	Other sport (Cricket)

==== Drafting ====
Draft	Pick	Name
2016 draft	2	Emily Bates
2016 draft	15	Tahlia Randall
2016 draft	18	Nicole Hildebrand
2016 draft	31	Leah Kaslar
2016 draft	34	Jess Wuetschner
2016 draft	47	Ally Anderson
2016 draft	50	Breanna Koenen
2016 draft	63	Megan Hunt
2016 draft	66	Sam Virgo
2016 draft	79	Kate Lutkins
2016 draft	82	Kate McCarthy
2016 draft	95	Shaleise Law
2016 draft	98	Selina Goodman
2016 draft	111	Sharni Webb
2016 draft	114	Nikki Wallace
2016 draft	127	Jamie Stanton
2016 draft	128	Jade Ransfield
2016 draft	141	Brittany Gibson

==== Free agent signings ====
1. Shannon Campbell
2. Caitlin Collins
3. Jordan Membrey

=== 2017/18 off-season ===
==== Drafting ====
Draft	Pick	Name	Reason for rookie eligibility
2017 draft	7	Jordan Zanchetta	—N/a
2017 draft	15	Arianna Clarke	—N/a
2017 draft	23	Renee Cowan	—N/a
2017 draft	31	Kalinda Howarth	—N/a
2017 draft	37	Emma Pittman	—N/a
2017 draft	41	Ruby Blair	—N/a
2017 draft	45	Sophie Conway	—N/a
2017 draft	48	Jessy Keeffe	—N/a
2017 rookie draft	7	Gabby Collingwood	Under 21
2017 rookie draft	14	Molly Ritson	Under 21
2017 rookie draft	18	Krystal Scott	Other sport (Tennis)

==== Trading ====
Club traded with	Player(s) and/or draft pick(s) in	Player(s) and/or draft pick(s) out
Carlton	Bella Ayre; Nat Exon	Tayla Harris

=== 2018/19 off-season ===
==== Drafting ====
Draft	Pick	Name
2018 draft	9	Paige Parker
2018 draft	22	Nat Grider
2018 draft	33	McKenzie Dowrick
2018 draft	45	Lauren Bella
2018 draft	56	Tori Groves-Little
2018 draft	61	Jesse Wardlaw

==== Post-draft rookie compensation selections ====
Selection	Name
1	Jacqui Yorston
2	Jade Ellenger

==== Rookie player signing ====
Player	Reason for rookie eligibility
Bri McFarlane	Other sport (Association football)

==== Rookie elevation ====
1. Gabby Collingwood

==== Trading ====
Club traded with	Player(s) and/or draft pick(s) in	Player(s) and/or draft pick(s) out
Collingwood	Pick 40	Nicole Hildebrand
Carlton	Lauren Arnell	Pick 40

==== Free agency ====
In/out	Club	Player	Type
Out	Brisbane	Ruby Blair	Delisted
In	Brisbane	Ruby Blair	Delisted
Out	Brisbane	Jessy Keeffe	Delisted
In	Brisbane	Jessy Keeffe	Delisted

==== Expansion club signings ====
Before the Geelong and North Melbourne Football Clubs' entries into the AFL Women's, the new clubs were allowed to sign a maximum of four players collectively from each club in the league, and more with permission from a player's club.

Player	Club	Permission required?	Compensation
Tahlia Randall	North Melbourne	No	Two post-draft rookie selections
Jamie Stanton	North Melbourne	No	Two post-draft rookie selections
Brittany Gibson	North Melbourne	No	Two post-draft rookie selections
Kaitlyn Ashmore	North Melbourne	No	Two post-draft rookie selections

==== Registered inactive player ====
Prior to the season, clubs were permitted to list any inactive players, retaining them while also replacing them with active players for 2019.

Player	Reason for inactivity
Sophie Conway	Injury (Knee)

=== 2019/20 off-season ===
==== Drafting ====
Draft	Pick	Name
2019 draft	3	Lily Postlethwaite
2019 draft	15	Belle Dawes
2019 draft	16	Cathy Svarc
2019 draft	17	Hannah Hillman
2019 draft	20	Lucy Bellinger
2019 draft	28	Tahlia Hickie
2019 draft	45	Selina Priest
2019 draft	60	Dakota Davidson
2019 draft	75	Maria Moloney

==== Rookie player signings ====
Player	Reason for rookie eligibility
Greta Bodey	Other sport (Association football)
Orla O'Dwyer	Other sport (Camogie/ladies' Gaelic football)

==== Trading ====
Club traded with	Player(s) and/or draft pick(s) in	Player(s) and/or draft pick(s) out
Richmond	Pick 12	Sabrina Frederick
St Kilda	Pick 11	Kate McCarthy
West Coast	Pick 13	McKenzie Dowrick

==== Free agency ====
In/out	Club	Player	Type
In	Adelaide	Rheanne Lugg	Delisted

==== Expansion club signings ====
Before the entries of Gold Coast, Richmond, St Kilda and West Coast into the AFL Women's, the new clubs were allowed to sign a maximum of eight players collectively from the Lions (and varying numbers of other players from other clubs).

Player	Club	Compensation
Lauren Bella	Gold Coast	Pick 20
Nat Exon	St Kilda	Pick 20
Tori Groves-Little	Gold Coast	Pick 20
Leah Kaslar	Gold Coast	Pick 20
Paige Parker	Gold Coast	Pick 20
Emma Pittman	Gold Coast	Pick 20
Sam Virgo	Gold Coast	Pick 20
Jacqui Yorston	Gold Coast	Pick 20

=== 2020/21 off-season ===
==== Drafting ====
Draft	Pick	Name
2020 draft	8	Zimmorlei Farquharson
2020 draft	37	Indy Tahau
2020 draft	38	Ruby Svarc

==== Rookie player signing ====
Player	Reason for rookie eligibility
Courtney Hodder	Other sport (Rugby union)

==== Trading ====
Club traded with	Player(s) and/or draft pick(s) in	Player(s) and/or draft pick(s) out
Gold Coast	Taylor Smith; Pick 37; Pick 51	Pick 24

==== Registered inactive players ====
Player	Reason for inactivity
Gabby Collingwood	Injury (Knee)
Sharni Webb	Pregnancy

==== Replacement signing ====
Player signed	Replacing
Beth Pinchin	Sharni Webb

=== 2021/22 off-season ===
==== Drafting ====
Draft	Pick	Name
2021 draft	18	Maggie Harmer
2021 draft	35	Bella Smith
2021 draft	46	Mikayla Pauga
2021 draft	53	Luka Yoshida-Martin
2021 draft	58	Lulu Pullar

==== Free agency ====
In/out	Club	Player	Type
In	Richmond	Phoebe Monahan	Delisted

==== Registered inactive player ====
Player	Reason for inactivity
Lily Postlethwaite	Injury (Knee)

=== 2022/S7 off-season ===
==== Drafting ====
Draft	Pick	Name
2022 draft	41	Ella Smith
2022 draft	57	Dee Heslop
2022 draft	70	Charlotte Mullins
2022 draft	78	Kiara Hillier

==== Free agency ====
In/out	Club	Player	Type
Out	Essendon	Jess Wuetschner	Delisted

==== Expansion club signings ====
Before the entries of Essendon, Hawthorn, Port Adelaide and Sydney into the AFL Women's, the new clubs were allowed to sign a maximum of four players collectively from the Lions (and varying numbers of other players from other clubs).

Player	Club
Maria Moloney	Port Adelaide
Indy Tahau	Port Adelaide

==== Registered inactive players ====
Player	Reason for inactivity
Gabby Collingwood	Injury (Knee)
Maggie Harmer	Mental health
Bella Smith	Injury (Knee)

==== Replacement signing ====
Player signed	Replacing
Ava Seton	Bella Smith

=== S7/2023 off-season ===
==== Drafting ====
Draft	Pick	Name
2023 supplementary draft	16	Poppy Boltz

==== Rookie player signing ====
Player	Reason for rookie eligibility
Jennifer Dunne	Other sport (Ladies' Gaelic football)
Courtney Murphy	Other sport (Basketball)

==== Trading ====
Club traded with	Player(s) and/or draft pick(s) in	Player(s) and/or draft pick(s) out
Gold Coast	Ellie Hampson	—
North Melbourne	Pick 40	Lulu Pullar
St Kilda	—	Jesse Wardlaw

==== Free agency ====
In/out	Club	Player	Type
In	Gold Coast	Jade Pregelj	Delisted

==== Priority signings ====
Because of the short preparation time available before their first season in S7, Essendon, Hawthorn, Port Adelaide and Sydney were allowed to sign a maximum of five players collectively from the Lions (and varying numbers of other players from other clubs) for their second seasons. Signings were limited to players who had spent at least three seasons on AFLW lists.

Player	Club	Compensation
Emily Bates	Hawthorn	TBA
Greta Bodey	Hawthorn	TBA

==== Registered inactive player ====
Player	Reason for inactivity
Kate Lutkins	Personal
