= List of Brisbane Lions players =

This is a list of every player to have been listed in the Australian Football League or the AFL Women's for the Brisbane Lions in the club's history.

Players are listed in order of debut, and the start of their Brisbane Lions career is determined by their year of debut, and the end is determined by the year of their final game playing for the Brisbane Lions. This guideline results in the possibility that players may not have necessarily begun or finished their career on the Brisbane Lions' list within these periods listed.

== AFL players ==
Key
Order	Players are listed in order of debut, then alphabetically by surname
Seasons	Includes Brisbane Lions only careers. All seasons spent on the Brisbane list from the player's AFL debut for the club to their last AFL game for the club
Debut	Debuts are for AFL regular season and finals series matches only
Games	Statistics are for AFL regular season and finals series matches only and are correct to the end of the 2026 season. Games played for either of the two clubs that merged in 1996 to form the Brisbane Lions, the Brisbane Bears and the Fitzroy Football Club are not included in this list. However, Brisbane Bears players who played for the Brisbane Lions are officially recognised by the AFL as being one-club players whereas Fitzroy players who were selected by the Bears to play for Brisbane are not. Official AFL records list former Fitzroy players as being two-club players.
Goals
AFL Tables profile	Link to the player's profile at AFL Tables
^{^}	Currently listed players
^{m}	Player joined the list midway through the season

Order	Name	Seasons	Debut	Games	Goals	AFL Tables profile
1	Marcus Ashcroft	1997–2003	round 1, 1997	166	61	Profile
2	Richard Champion	1997–2000	round 1, 1997	64	43	Profile
3	Matthew Clarke	1997–1999	round 1, 1997	61	13	Profile
4	Danny Dickfos	1997–1999	round 1, 1997	43	0	Profile
5	Adrian Fletcher	1997	round 1, 1997	21	4	Profile
6	Andy Gowers	1997–1999	round 1, 1997	11	2	Profile
7	Shaun Hart	1997–2004	round 1, 1997	171	96	Profile
8	Chris Johnson	1997–2007	round 1, 1997	205	105	Profile
9	Clark Keating	1997–2006	round 1, 1997	125	74	Profile
10	Matthew Kennedy	1997–2001	round 1, 1997	75	5	Profile
11	Nigel Lappin	1997–2008	round 1, 1997	218	134	Profile
12	Justin Leppitsch	1997–2006	round 1, 1997	183	136	Profile
13	Alastair Lynch	1997–2004	round 1, 1997	154	371	Profile
14	Tristan Lynch	1997–1998	round 1, 1997	34	7	Profile
15	Scott McIvor	1997	round 1, 1997	7	4	Profile
16	Michael McLean	1997	round 1, 1997	1	0	Profile
17	Jarrod Molloy	1997–2000	round 1, 1997	61	104	Profile
18	Ben Robbins	1997–2001	round 1, 1997	47	13	Profile
19	Dion Scott	1997–1999	round 1, 1997	24	22	Profile
20	Michael Voss	1997–2006	round 1, 1997	210	173	Profile
21	Darryl White	1997–2005	round 1, 1997	178	59	Profile
22	Scott Bamford	1997–1998	round 2, 1997	24	17	Profile
23	Andrew Bews	1997–1998	round 2, 1997	19	0	Profile
24	Craig Lambert	1997–2000	round 2, 1997	47	8	Profile
25	Jason Akermanis	1997–2006	round 3, 1997	210	263	Profile
26	Craig McRae	1997–2004	round 3, 1997	156	176	Profile
27	Nathan Chapman	1997	round 4, 1997	11	1	Profile
28	Brett Voss	1997–2000	round 5, 1997	35	11	Profile
29	John Barker	1997	round 6, 1997	8	1	Profile
30	Chris Scott	1997–2007	round 6, 1997	160	56	Profile
31	Nick Carter	1997–1998	round 7, 1997	5	1	Profile
32	Shane Clayton	1997–1998	round 7, 1997	5	0	Profile
33	Brent Green	1997	round 7, 1997	2	0	Profile
34	Daniel Bradshaw	1997–2009	round 8, 1997	219	496	Profile
35	Brad Boyd	1997–1999	round 9, 1997	15	8	Profile
36	Nick Trask	1997–1998	round 10, 1997	12	3	Profile
37	Steven Lawrence	1997–2000	round 15, 1997	68	42	Profile
38	Trent Bartlett	1998–1999	round 1, 1998	17	7	Profile
39	Simon Black	1998–2013	round 1, 1998	322	171	Profile
40	Brad Scott	1998–2006	round 1, 1998	146	39	Profile
41	Shane O'Bree	1998–1999	round 2, 1998	19	3	Profile
42	Luke Power	1998–2011	round 2, 1998	244	201	Profile
43	Marcus Picken	1998–2001	round 3, 1998	25	9	Profile
44	Beau McDonald	1998–2007	round 4, 1998	91	19	Profile
45	Rory Hilton	1998	round 6, 1998	9	3	Profile
46	Tim Notting	1998–2009	round 8, 1998	208	138	Profile
47	Derek Wirth	1998	round 18, 1998	1	2	Profile
48	Adam Heuskes	1999–2000	round 1, 1999	39	5	Profile
49	David Calthorpe	1999	round 3, 1999	9	2	Profile
50	Martin McKinnon	1999–2000	round 6, 1999	7	5	Profile
51	Des Headland	1999–2002	round 13, 1999	52	52	Profile
52	Craig Bolton	2000–2002	round 1, 2000	29	10	Profile
53	Stefan Carey	2000	round 1, 2000	3	1	Profile
54	Michael Martin	2000	round 2, 2000	10	0	Profile
55	Shannon Rusca	2000	round 3, 2000	2	0	Profile
56	Jonathan Brown	2000–2014	round 5, 2000	256	594	Profile
57	Aaron Shattock	2000–2004	round 5, 2000	57	15	Profile
58	Damian Cupido	2000–2001	round 11, 2000	13	16	Profile
59	Trent Knobel	2000–2001	round 14, 2000	13	0	Profile
60	Nathan Clarke	2000–2001	round 18, 2000	6	4	Profile
61	Mal Michael	2001–2006	round 1, 2001	140	5	Profile
62	Martin Pike	2001–2005	round 1, 2001	106	67	Profile
63	Richard Hadley	2001–2007	round 3, 2001	41	10	Profile
64	Jamie Charman	2001–2009	round 5, 2001	129	55	Profile
65	Robert Copeland	2001–2008	round 9, 2001	143	39	Profile
66	Ashley McGrath	2001–2014	round 20, 2001	214	170	Profile
67	Dylan McLaren	2001–2005	round 20, 2001	46	6	Profile
68	Shane Morrison	2002–2003	round 6, 2002	5	0	Profile
69	Darren Bradshaw	2002	round 15, 2002	1	0	Profile
70	Blake Caracella	2003–2004	round 1, 2003	34	33	Profile
71	Jared Brennan	2003–2010	round 4, 2003	103	67	Profile
72	Luke Weller	2003	round 12, 2003	4	1	Profile
73	Jason Gram	2003	round 13, 2003	2	0	Profile
74	Anthony Corrie	2004–2008	round 4, 2004	53	48	Profile
75	Jed Adcock	2004–2015	round 7, 2004	206	59	Profile
76	Daniel Pratt	2004	round 9, 2004	3	1	Profile
77	Joel Macdonald	2004–2009	round 10, 2004	80	6	Profile
78	Michael Rischitelli	2004–2010	round 1, 2004	92	42	Profile
79	Troy Selwood	2005–2009	round 17, 2005	70	11	Profile
80	Tom Logan	2005	round 2, 2005	3	0	Profile
81	Daniel Merrett	2005–2016	round 2, 2005	200	70	Profile
82	Jayden Attard	2005–2006	round 4, 2005	5	1	Profile
83	Justin Sherman	2005–2010	round 4, 2005	114	85	Profile
84	Cameron Wood	2005–2007	round 5, 2005	16	0	Profile
85	Matthew Moody	2005–2008	round 6, 2005	34	14	Profile
86	Llane Spaanderman	2005	round 6, 2005	3	1	Profile
87	Josh Drummond	2005–2012	round 8, 2005	94	35	Profile
88	Leigh Ryswyk	2005	round 11, 2005	1	0	Profile
89	Travis Baird	2005	round 19, 2005	2	1	Profile
90	Mitch Clark	2006–2011	round 1, 2006	49	26	Profile
91	Ben Fixter	2006–2007	round 1, 2006	27	3	Profile
92	Scott Harding	2006–2009	round 1, 2006	48	15	Profile
93	Rhan Hooper	2006–2009	round 2, 2006	48	49	Profile
94	Wayde Mills	2006–2008	round 2, 2006	16	3	Profile
95	Cheynee Stiller	2006–2012	round 3, 2006	100	21	Profile
96	Jason Roe	2006–2009	round 6, 2006	50	7	Profile
97	Joel Patfull	2006–2014	round 8, 2006	182	24	Profile
98	Marty Pask	2006	round 11, 2006	8	4	Profile
99	Marcus Allan	2006–2007	round 19, 2006	5	1	Profile
100	Colm Begley	2006–2008	round 20, 2006	29	7	Profile
101	Chris Schmidt	2007	round 10, 2007	2	0	Profile
102	Albert Proud	2007–2009	round 12, 2007	22	4	Profile
103	Daniel Dzufer	2007	round 13, 2007	1	0	Profile
104	Will Hamill	2007	round 14, 2007	3	1	Profile
105	Matthew Leuenberger	2007–2015	round 14, 2007	108	27	Profile
106	Travis Johnstone	2008–2010	round 1, 2008	37	23	Profile
107	Lachie Henderson	2008–2009	round 2, 2008	15	3	Profile
108	James Polkinghorne	2008–2014	round 6, 2008	94	53	Profile
109	James Hawksley	2008–2012	round 11, 2008	32	6	Profile
110	Tom Collier	2008–2011	round 13, 2008	12	1	Profile
111	Bradd Dalziell	2008–2009	round 16, 2008	15	4	Profile
112	Scott Clouston	2008	round 18, 2008	2	1	Profile
113	Pearce Hanley	2008–2016	round 21, 2008	129	58	Profile
114	Daniel Rich	2009–2023	round 1, 2009	275	116	Profile
115	Sam Sheldon	2009–2012	round 6, 2009	43	11	Profile
116	Matt Austin	2009–2011	round 8, 2009	8	2	Profile
117	Aaron Cornelius	2009–2013	round 9, 2009	25	35	Profile
118	Jack Redden	2009–2015	round 15, 2009	129	52	Profile
119	Tom Rockliff	2009–2017	round 18, 2009	154	87	Profile
120	Todd Banfield	2010–2013	round 1, 2010	53	57	Profile
121	Amon Buchanan	2010–2012	round 1, 2010	13	9	Profile
122	Brendan Fevola	2010	round 1, 2010	17	48	Profile
123	Matt Maguire	2010–2015	round 1, 2010	71	2	Profile
124	Andrew Raines	2010–2014	round 1, 2010	64	14	Profile
125	Brent Staker	2010–2015	round 1, 2010	51	35	Profile
126	Jesse O'Brien	2010–2013	round 14, 2010	17	4	Profile
127	Ryan Harwood	2010–2017	round 17, 2010	81	6	Profile
128	Xavier Clarke	2010	round 18, 2010	1	0	Profile
129	Claye Beams	2011–2018	round 1, 2011	54	27	Profile
130	Rohan Bewick	2011–2018	round 1, 2011	103	71	Profile
131	Ryan Lester^	2011–	round 1, 2011	256	49	Profile
132	Broc McCauley	2011	round 2, 2011	3	0	Profile
133	Jared Polec	2011–2013	round 3, 2011	16	9	Profile
134	Bryce Retzlaff	2011–2012	round 7, 2011	11	6	Profile
135	Josh Green	2011–2016	round 9, 2011	81	107	Profile
136	Mitch Golby	2011–2015	round 12, 2011	56	6	Profile
137	Patrick Karnezis	2011–2013	round 13, 2011	21	24	Profile
138	Niall McKeever	2011–2013	round 14, 2011	22	2	Profile
139	Josh Dyson	2011–2012	round 20, 2011	1	0	Profile
140	Ben Hudson	2012	round 1, 2012	18	3	Profile
141	Billy Longer	2012–2013	round 3, 2012	9	2	Profile
142	Jack Crisp	2012–2014	round 4, 2012	18	10	Profile
143	Dayne Zorko^	2012–	round 7, 2012	321	241	Profile
144	Elliot Yeo	2012–2013	round 9, 2012	27	1	Profile
145	Stephen Wrigley	2012–2013	round 18, 2012	3	0	Profile
146	Jordan Lisle	2012–2014	round 19, 2012	18	15	Profile
147	Stefan Martin	2013–2020	round 1, 2013	133	23	Profile
148	Brent Moloney	2013–2014	round 1, 2013	21	9	Profile
149	Sam Mayes	2013–2018	round 3, 2013	101	26	Profile
150	Sam Docherty	2013	round 4, 2013	13	1	Profile
151	Marco Paparone	2013–2018	round 4, 2013	55	13	Profile
152	Justin Clarke	2013–2015	round 5, 2013	56	1	Profile
153	Sam Michael	2013	round 9, 2013	3	0	Profile
154	James Aish	2014–2015	round 1, 2014	32	8	Profile
155	Michael Close	2014–2017	round 1, 2014	27	24	Profile
156	Lewis Taylor	2014–2019	round 1, 2014	112	88	Profile
157	Trent West	2014–2016	round 1, 2014	16	5	Profile
158	Tom Cutler	2014–2019	round 4, 2014	66	32	Profile
159	Jackson Paine	2014–2016	round 4, 2014	10	3	Profile
160	Nick Robertson	2014–2019	round 4, 2014	73	10	Profile
161	Darcy Gardiner^	2014–	round 5, 2014	199	14	Profile
162	Luke McGuane	2014–2015	round 5, 2014	7	7	Profile
163	Zac O'Brien	2014–2015	round 11, 2014	13	1	Profile
164	Daniel McStay	2014–2022	round 15, 2014	161	138	Profile
165	Jonathan Freeman	2014–2017	round 20, 2014	14	16	Profile
166	Jordon Bourke	2014–2015	round 23, 2014	6	2	Profile
167	Dayne Beams	2015–2018	round 1, 2015	58	49	Profile
168	Allen Christensen	2015–2019	round 1, 2015	68	58	Profile
169	Jaden McGrath	2015–2016	round 1, 2015	3	0	Profile
170	Mitch Robinson	2015–2022	round 1, 2015	147	71	Profile
171	Harris Andrews^	2015–	round 3, 2015	263	11	Profile
172	Liam Dawson	2015–2018	round 8, 2015	18	6	Profile
173	Hugh Beasley	2015–2016	round 10, 2015	6	0	Profile
174	Billy Evans	2015–2016	round 19, 2015	7	1	Profile
175	Ryan Bastinac	2016–2019	round 1, 2016	43	27	Profile
176	Tom Bell	2016–2018	round 1, 2016	21	20	Profile
177	Josh Schache	2016–2017	round 1, 2016	27	25	Profile
178	Josh Walker	2016–2019	round 1, 2016	52	34	Profile
179	Ben Keays	2016–2019	round 6, 2016	30	11	Profile
180	Rhys Mathieson	2016–2022	round 9, 2016	72	29	Profile
181	Jarrad Jansen	2016–2017	round 11, 2016	8	4	Profile
182	Eric Hipwood^	2016–	round 13, 2016	213	307	Profile
183	Matthew Hammelmann	2016–2017	round 14, 2016	12	2	Profile
184	Reuben William	2016	round 16, 2016	3	0	Profile
185	Archie Smith	2016–2020	round 19, 2016	16	4	Profile
186	Josh Clayton	2016	round 22, 2016	2	0	Profile
187	Jake Barrett	2017–2018	round 1, 2017	22	19	Profile
188	Jack Frost	2017	round 2, 2017	2	0	Profile
189	Jarrod Berry^	2017–	round 3, 2017	206	78	Profile
190	Hugh McCluggage^	2017–	round 3, 2017	226	147	Profile
191	Cedric Cox	2017–2019	round 4, 2017	13	3	Profile
192	Alex Witherden	2017–2020	round 14, 2017	59	5	Profile
193	Jacob Allison	2017–2019	round 19, 2017	10	2	Profile
194	Sam Skinner	2017–2020	round 19, 2017	3	3	Profile
195	Charlie Cameron^	2018–	round 1, 2018	208	410	Profile
196	Luke Hodge	2018–2019	round 1, 2018	41	1	Profile
197	Cam Rayner^	2018–	round 1, 2018	194	198	Profile
198	Zac Bailey^	2018–	round 4, 2018	192	220	Profile
199	Oscar McInerney	2018–2025	round 6, 2018	165	67	Profile
200	Matt Eagles	2018–2020	round 7, 2018	6	1	Profile
201	Brandon Starcevich	2018–2025	round 20, 2018	132	8	Profile
202	Jarryd Lyons	2019–2024	round 1, 2019	102	37	Profile
203	Lincoln McCarthy^	2019–	round 1, 2019	130	148	Profile
204	Lachie Neale	2019–2026	round 1, 2019	186	74	Profile
205	Noah Answerth^	2019–	round 6, 2019	104	3	Profile
206	Mitch Hinge	2019–2020	round 9, 2019	3	1	Profile
207	Marcus Adams	2019–2022	round 16, 2019	46	1	Profile
208	Deven Robertson	2020–2025	round 1, 2020	47	10	Profile
209	Callum Ah Chee	2020–2025	round 2, 2020	124	75	Profile
210	Tom Berry	2020–2022	round 2, 2020	20	3	Profile
211	Grant Birchall	2020–2021	round 2, 2020	39	2	Profile
212	Cam Ellis-Yolmen	2020	round 3, 2020	9	3	Profile
213	Connor Ballenden	2020–2021	round 9, 2020	3	1	Profile
214	Jack Payne^	2020–	round 10, 2020	81	2	Profile
215	Tom Fullarton	2020–2022	round 13, 2020	19	6	Profile
216	Keidean Coleman	2020–2026	round 15, 2020	79	16	Profile
217	Joe Daniher	2021–2024	round 1, 2021	96	204	Profile
218	Harry Sharp	2021–2024	round 1, 2021	16	4	Profile
219	Jaxon Prior	2021–2024	round 2, 2021	39	11	Profile
220	James Madden	2021–2023	round 7, 2021	13	1	Profile
221	Nakia Cockatoo	2021–2022	round 19, 2021	15	7	Profile
222	Darcy Fort^	2022–	round 1, 2022	75	23	Profile
223	Kai Lohmann^	2022–	round 5, 2022	80	112	Profile
224	James Tunstill^	2022–	round 15, 2022	23	3	Profile
225	Carter Michael	2022	round 17, 2022	1	1	Profile
226	Darcy Wilmot^	2022–	elimination final, 2022	110	13	Profile
227	Will Ashcroft^	2023–	round 1, 2023	85	43	Profile
228	Josh Dunkley^	2023–	round 1, 2023	105	19	Profile
229	Jack Gunston	2023	round 1, 2023	17	22	Profile
230	Conor McKenna^	2023–	round 1, 2023	70	34	Profile
231	Darragh Joyce	2023–2026	round 2, 2023	14	0	Profile
232	Jaspa Fletcher^	2023–	round 14, 2023	95	23	Profile
233	Logan Morris^	2024–	round 8, 2024	71	149	Profile
234	Bruce Reville^	2024–	round 8, 2024	43	12	Profile
235	Shadeau Brain^	2024–	round 9, 2024	11	0	Profile
236	Brandon Ryan	2024	round 11, 2024	1	1	Profile
237	Henry Smith^	2024–	round 19, 2024	6	4	Profile
238	Levi Ashcroft^	2025–	round 1, 2025	54	27	Profile
239	Sam Day	2025	round 2, 2025	13	3	Profile
240	Will McLachlan	2025–2026	round 2, 2025	7	4	Profile
241	Sam Marshall	2025–2026	round 6, 2025	13	1	Profile
242	Ty Gallop^	2025–	round 13, 2025	27	5	Profile
243	Tom Doedee^	2025–	round 22, 2025	1	0	Profile
244	Luke Beecken	2025	round 23, 2025	1	0	Profile
245	Oscar Allen^	2026–	opening round, 2026	15	25	Profile
246	Zane Zakostelsky^	2026–	opening round, 2026	3	1	Profile
247	Daniel Annable^	2026–	round 1, 2026	3	1	Profile
248	Sam Draper^	2026–	round 1, 2026	26	17	Profile
249	Cody Curtin^	2026–	round 8, 2026	4	2	Profile

== Other AFL-listed players ==
=== Listed players yet to make their debut for Brisbane ===
Player	Date of birth	Acquired	Recruited from	Listed		Ref
Player	Date of birth	Acquired	Recruited from	Rookie	Senior	Ref
Kodah Edwards	25 July 2008	No. 27, 2026 national draft	South Adelaide/Willunga	—N/a	2027–	
Koby Evans	8 September 2007	No. 38, 2025 national draft	Perth	2027– (Note: Temporarily delisted, but club has committed to redrafting player in 2027 rookie draft.)	2026	
Tai Hayes	18 November 2004	No. 44, 2025 national draft	Southport	—N/a	2026–	
Luke Lloyd	8 August 2005	No. 42, 2023 national draft	Sandringham Dragons	2027–	2024–2026	
Ben Murphy	1 February 2007	Category B rookie selection, 2025	Kerry GAA	2026–	—N/a	
Jackson Phillips	30 January 2008	No. 29, 2026 national draft	Dandenong Stingrays/Langwarrin	—N/a	2027–	
Archie Spencer	24 September 2008	No. 36, 2026 national draft	Eastern Ranges/Woori Yallock	—N/a	2027–	
Reece Torrent	3 August 2005	No. 64, 2023 national draft	Peel Thunder	—N/a	2024–	
Archie Van Dyk	28 July 2008	No. 28, 2026 national draft	South Adelaide/Port Noarlunga	—N/a	2027–	

=== Formerly listed players who never played a senior game for Brisbane ===
Player	Date of birth	Acquired	Listed	
Player	Date of birth	Acquired	Rookie	Senior
Andrew Gowling	7 February 1978	From Brisbane Bears after merger	—N/a	1997
Simon Hawking	5 March 1973	From Fitzroy after merger	—N/a	1997
Tate Day	12 September 1978	No. 89, 1998 rookie draft	1998	1999
Scott Ralph	22 March 1979	No. 59, 1997 national draft	1999	1998
Jeff Cooper	15 March 1978	No. 44, 1999 rookie draft	1999–2000	—N/a
Jason Anthonisz	26 May 1981	No. 29, 2000 rookie draft	2000	—N/a
Ben Doherty	1 June 1981	No. 13, 2000 rookie draft	2000	—N/a
Stephen Kenna	8 October 1981	No. 68, 2000 rookie draft	2000	—N/a
Hayden Kluver	18 March 1980	No. 70, 2000 rookie draft	2000–2001	—N/a
Clint Alleway	24 April 1981	No. 63, 2001 rookie draft	2001	—N/a
Luke Hammond	20 April 1982	No. 69, 2000 national draft	—N/a	2001–2002
David Mapleston	10 August 1981	No. 12, 2001 rookie draft	2001–2002	—N/a
Tom Tarrant	6 September 1982	No. 67, 2001 rookie draft	2001	—N/a
Nick Raines	14 May 1983	No. 66, 2002 rookie draft	2002–2003	—N/a
Jarrad Wright	28 April 1984	No. 35, 2001 national draft	—N/a	2002–2003
Paul Shelton	27 January 1984	No. 72, 2003 rookie draft	2003	—N/a
Kevin Tandogac	1 October 1983	No. 32, 2003 rookie draft	2003	—N/a
Jake Furfaro	4 February 1985	No. 61, 2004 rookie draft	2004	—N/a
Matt Pardew	16 February 1985	No. 32, 2004 rookie draft	2004	—N/a
Jeremy Stiller	9 November 1982	No. 70, 2004 rookie draft	2004	—N/a
Luke Forsyth	2 February 1987	No. 64, 2004 national draft	2006–2007	2005
Pat Garner	16 March 1987	No. 27, 2004 national draft	2008–2009	2005–2007
Leonard Clark	23 August 1983	No. 22, 2006 rookie draft	2006	—N/a
Haydyn Kiel	15 January 1988	No. 48, 2007 rookie draft	2007–2008	—N/a
Joel Tippett	26 October 1988	No. 57, 2007 rookie draft	2007–2009	—N/a
Matthew Tyler	20 June 1988	No. 54, 2006 national draft	—N/a	2007–2009
Phil Smith	15 April 1989	No. 7, 2008 rookie draft	2008	—N/a
Kieran King	5 March 1991	No. 81, 2008 national draft	—N/a	2009
Bart McCulloch	23 September 1990	No. 69, 2008 national draft	2011	2009–2010
Daniel Murray	3 May 1990	No. 7, 2009 rookie draft	2009	—N/a
Adam Spackman	4 April 1989	No. 66, 2009 rookie draft	2009	—N/a
Callum Bartlett	19 June 1991	No. 27, 2009 national draft	—N/a	2010–2013
Sean Yoshiura	6 August 1991	No. 74, 2010 rookie draft	2010	—N/a
Brad Harvey	16 April 1992	No. 13, 2011 rookie draft	2011–2012	—N/a
Richard Newell	23 March 1993	No. 57, 2012 rookie draft	2012–2013	—N/a
Patrick Wearden	6 August 1993	No. 47, 2011 national draft	—N/a	2012–2014
Nick Hayes	11 August 1994	No. 6, 2013 rookie draft	2013–2014	—N/a
Isaac Conway	29 May 1995	No. 6, 2014 rookie draft	2014	—N/a
Cian Hanley	14 March 1996	No. 56, 2015 rookie draft	2015–2018	—N/a
Josh McGuinness	20 September 1995	No. 81, 2014 national draft	—N/a	2015–2016
Josh Watts	6 March 1996	No. 65, 2014 national draft	—N/a	2015–2016
Blake Grewar	16 February 1993	Category B rookie selection, 2017	2017	—N/a
Corey Lyons	31 May 1998	No. 71, 2016 national draft	2020	2017–2019
Toby Wooller	16 March 1999	No. 41, 2017 national draft	—N/a	2018–2020
Tom Joyce	7 March 2000	No. 40, 2018 national draft	—N/a	2019–2021
Connor McFadyen	4 December 2000	No. 42, 2018 national draft	—N/a	2019–2022
Ely Smith	13 September 2000	No. 21, 2018 national draft	—N/a	2019–2022
Brock Smith	13 March 2001	No. 33, 2019 national draft	—N/a	2020–2021
Blake Coleman	6 August 2002	No. 24, 2020 national draft	—N/a	2021–2023
Deividas Uosis	28 June 2000	Category B rookie selection, 2021	2021–2022	—N/a
Kalin Lane	5 December 2001	No. 14, 2021 mid-season rookie draft	2021^{m}–2024	—N/a
Mitch Cox	24 March 1997	Pre-season supplemental selection, 2022	2022	—N/a
Darryl McDowell-White	14 January 1997	Category B rookie selection, 2023	2023	—N/a
Darcy Craven	22 July 2004	No. 21, 2024 mid-season rookie draft	2024^{m}–2025	—N/a

==== 2022 COVID contingency list ====
For the 2022 season, clubs were permitted a supplementary list of 20 state league players, who would be available to play in the AFL if players were unavailable due to the league's health and safety protocols during the COVID-19 pandemic. Brisbane selected VFL players from Coburg, Port Melbourne and their own reserves team. None played an AFL game for the Lions in 2022, though Bruce Reville later played for the club at AFL level.

Player	Date of birth	State league club/s
Tahj Abberley	29 April 2002	Brisbane VFL/Wilston Grange
Harry Arnold	8 April 1999	Brisbane VFL/Broadbeach
Charlie Bowes	13 March 2002	Brisbane VFL/Wilston Grange
Wylie Buzza	2 March 1996	Brisbane VFL/Mount Gravatt
Nathan Colenso	6 November 2001	Brisbane VFL/Morningside
Will Fletcher	31 December 1998	Brisbane VFL/Sherwood
Riley Greene	15 October 2001	Brisbane VFL/Sherwood
Jackson Hille	5 August 1999	Brisbane VFL/Morningside
Harvey Hooper	10 July 1997	Port Melbourne
Paul Hunter	9 February 1993	Port Melbourne
Sam Lowson	24 August 1995	Coburg
Jack Maibaum	27 March 1998	Coburg
Peter McEvoy	27 July 1991	Coburg
Luke O'Sullivan	28 May 1998	Brisbane VFL/Mount Gravatt
Charlie Offermans	19 November 1998	Brisbane VFL/Labrador
Bruce Reville	22 February 2001	Brisbane VFL/Sherwood
Fletcher Roberts	3 June 1993	Port Melbourne
Charlie Thompson	15 March 1999	Coburg
Toby Triffett	24 February 2002	Brisbane VFL/Morningside
Corey Wagner	23 March 1997	Port Melbourne

== AFL Women's players ==
Key
Order	Players are listed in order of debut, then alphabetically by surname
Seasons before debut	Seasons spent on the Brisbane list before player made their AFL Women's debut for the club
Seasons	All seasons spent on the Brisbane list from the player's AFL Women's debut for the club to their last AFL Women's game for the club
Seasons after last game	Seasons spent on the Brisbane list after player played their last AFL Women's game for the club
Debut	Debuts are for AFL Women's regular season and finals series matches only
Games	Statistics are for AFL Women's regular season and finals series matches only and are correct to the end of the 2026 season.
Goals	Statistics are for AFL Women's regular season and finals series matches only and are correct to the end of the 2026 season.
AF profile	Link to the player's profile on australianfootball.com
Ref	Reference/s used in addition to australianfootball.com if necessary
^{^}	Currently listed players
^{i: season}	Player was registered as inactive for the season listed

Order	Name	Seasons before debut	Seasons	Seasons after last game	Debut	Games	Goals	AF profile	Ref
1	Ally Anderson^	—N/a	2017–	—N/a	round 1, 2017	116	16	Profile	
2	Kaitlyn Ashmore	—N/a	2017–2018	—N/a	round 1, 2017	16	5	Profile	
3	Emily Bates	—N/a	2017–2022 (S7)	—N/a	round 1, 2017	66	9	Profile	
4	Shannon Campbell^	—N/a	2017–	—N/a	round 1, 2017	115	10	Profile	
5	Sabrina Frederick	—N/a	2017–2019	—N/a	round 1, 2017	23	15	Profile	
6	Brittany Gibson	—N/a	2017–2018	—N/a	round 1, 2017	16	5	Profile	
7	Tayla Harris	—N/a	2017	—N/a	round 1, 2017	8	4	Profile	
8	Nicole Hildebrand	—N/a	2017–2018	—N/a	round 1, 2017	13	0	Profile	
9	Megan Hunt	—N/a	2017–2019	—N/a	round 1, 2017	14	1	Profile	
10	Leah Kaslar	—N/a	2017–2019	—N/a	round 1, 2017	21	0	Profile	
11	Breanna Koenen^	—N/a	2017–	—N/a	round 1, 2017	115	3	Profile	
12	Shaleise Law	—N/a	2017	—N/a	round 1, 2017	3	0	Profile	
13	Kate Lutkins	—N/a	2017–2024^{i: 2023}	—N/a	round 1, 2017	52	3	Profile	
14	Kate McCarthy	—N/a	2017–2019	—N/a	round 1, 2017	23	16	Profile	
15	Selina Priest (Note: Known as Selina Goodman when listed in 2017, and as Selina Priest when listed from 2020–2021.)	—N/a	2017	2020–2021	round 1, 2017	8	0	Profile	
16	Tahlia Randall	—N/a	2017–2018	—N/a	round 1, 2017	15	0	Profile	
17	Jamie Stanton	—N/a	2017–2018	—N/a	round 1, 2017	16	0	Profile	
18	Sam Virgo	—N/a	2017–2019	—N/a	round 1, 2017	15	0	Profile	
19	Nikki Wallace	—N/a	2017	—N/a	round 1, 2017	8	0	Profile	
20	Sharni Webb	—N/a	2017–2022 (S7)^{i: 2021}	2023^{i: 2023}	round 1, 2017	31	1	Profile	
21	Jess Wuetschner	—N/a	2017–2022 (S6)	—N/a	round 1, 2017	38	37	Profile	
22	Emma Zielke	—N/a	2017–2021	—N/a	round 1, 2017	41	4	Profile	
23	Kate Deegan	—N/a	2017	—N/a	round 4, 2017	1	0	Profile	
24	Jordan Membrey	—N/a	2017	—N/a	round 4, 2017	5	1	Profile	
25	Delissa Kimmince	—N/a	2017	—N/a	round 6, 2017	1	0	Profile	
26	Arianna Clarke	—N/a	2018–2019	2020	round 1, 2018	12	0	Profile	
27	Gabby Collingwood	—N/a	2018–2022 (S6)^{i: 2021}	2022 (S7)^{i: 2022 (S7)}	round 1, 2018	12	0	Profile	
28	Sophie Conway^	—N/a	2018–^{i: 2019}	—N/a	round 1, 2018	101	62	Profile	
29	Jordan Zanchetta	—N/a	2018–2021	—N/a	round 1, 2018	13	1	Profile	
30	Nat Exon	—N/a	2018–2019	—N/a	round 2, 2018	14	6	Profile	
31	Bella Ayre	—N/a	2018	2019	round 3, 2018	6	0	Profile	
32	Emma Pittman	—N/a	2018–2019	—N/a	round 4, 2018	8	0	Profile	
33	Lauren Arnell	—N/a	2019–2021	—N/a	round 1, 2019	25	5	Profile	
34	Lauren Bella	—N/a	2019	—N/a	round 1, 2019	3	0	Profile	
35	McKenzie Dowrick	—N/a	2019	—N/a	round 1, 2019	7	0	Profile	
36	Paige Parker	—N/a	2019	—N/a	round 1, 2019	4	0	Profile	
37	Jesse Wardlaw	—N/a	2019–2022 (S7)	—N/a	round 1, 2019	49	47	Profile	
38	Tori Groves-Little	—N/a	2019	—N/a	round 2, 2019	2	0	Profile	
39	Nat Grider^	—N/a	2019–	—N/a	round 4, 2019	97	1	Profile	
40	Jessy Keeffe	2018	2019–2020	2021	round 4, 2019	11	0	Profile	
41	Jacqui Yorston	—N/a	2019	—N/a	round 4, 2019	4	0	Profile	
42	Jade Ellenger^	—N/a	2019–	—N/a	round 6, 2019	88	10	Profile	
43	Greta Bodey	—N/a	2020–2022 (S7)	—N/a	round 1, 2020	42	35	Profile	
44	Dakota Davidson^	—N/a	2020–	—N/a	round 1, 2020	89	94	Profile	
45	Belle Dawes^	—N/a	2020–	—N/a	round 1, 2020	97	16	Profile	
46	Rheanne Lugg	—N/a	2020–2021	—N/a	round 1, 2020	9	3	Profile	
47	Maria Moloney	—N/a	2020–2022 (S6)	—N/a	round 1, 2020	11	2	Profile	
48	Orla O'Dwyer^	—N/a	2020–	—N/a	round 1, 2020	94	40	Profile	
49	Lily Postlethwaite^	—N/a	2020–^{i: 2022 (S6)}	—N/a	round 1, 2020	63	8	Profile	
50	Cathy Svarc^	—N/a	2020–	—N/a	round 1, 2020	96	31	Profile	
51	Lucy Bellinger	—N/a	2020	—N/a	round 6, 2020	1	0	Profile	
52	Tahlia Hickie^	—N/a	2020–	—N/a	semi-final, 2020	91	4	Profile	
53	Courtney Hodder^	—N/a	2021–	—N/a	round 1, 2021	77	52	Profile	
54	Taylor Smith	—N/a	2021–2025	—N/a	round 1, 2021	76	67	Profile	
55	Indy Tahau	—N/a	2021–2022 (S6)	—N/a	round 4, 2021	19	0	Profile	
56	Phoebe Monahan	—N/a	2022 (S6)–2023	—N/a	round 1, 2022 (S6)	38	0	Profile	
57	Zimmorlei Farquharson	2021	2022 (S6)–2022 (S7)	2023^{i: 2023}	round 3, 2022 (S6)	17	12	Profile	
58	Ruby Svarc^	2021	2022 (S6)–	—N/a	round 3, 2022 (S6)	63	25	Profile	
59	Lulu Pullar	—N/a	2022 (S6)–2022 (S7)	—N/a	round 5, 2022 (S6)	14	0	Profile	
60	Luka Yoshida-Martin	—N/a	2022 (S6)–2024^{i: 2023}	—N/a	round 6, 2022 (S6)	5	2	Profile	
61	Maggie Harmer	—N/a	2022 (S6)	2022 (S7)^{i: 2022 (S7)}	qualifying final, 2022 (S6)	1	0	Profile	
62	Dee Heslop	—N/a	2022 (S7)–2024	2025	round 2, 2022 (S7)	22	0	Profile	
63	Mikayla Pauga	2022 (S6)	2022 (S7)–2023	—N/a	round 5, 2022 (S7)	15	0	Profile	
64	Analea McKee	—N/a	2023	—N/a	round 1, 2023	6	2	Profile	
65	Charlotte Mullins^	2022 (S7)	2023–	—N/a	round 1, 2023	52	23	Profile	
66	Jade Pregelj	—N/a	2023	2024	round 1, 2023	1	0	Profile	
67	Ella Smith	2022 (S7)	2023	—N/a	round 1, 2023	1	0	Profile	
68	Poppy Boltz	—N/a	2023–2025	—N/a	round 2, 2023	28	2	Profile	
69	Ellie Hampson	—N/a	2023–2025	—N/a	round 2, 2023	31	17	Profile	
70	Jennifer Dunne^	—N/a	2023–	—N/a	round 3, 2023	52	1	Profile	
71	Caitlin Wendland	—N/a	2023	—N/a	round 6, 2023	3	0	Profile	
72	Bella Smith	2022 (S6)–2022 (S7)^{i: 2022 (S7)}	2023	—N/a	round 9, 2023	1	0	Profile	
73	Shanae Davison^	—N/a	2024–	—N/a	round 1, 2024	29	8	Profile	
74	Eleanor Hartill^	—N/a	2024–	—N/a	round 2, 2024	39	12	Profile	
75	Sophie Peters^	—N/a	2024–	—N/a	round 3, 2024	19	2	Profile	
76	Evie Long^	—N/a	2024–	—N/a	round 4, 2024	23	6	Profile	
77	Neasa Dooley^	—N/a	2025–	—N/a	round 2, 2025	17	12	Profile	
78	Rania Crozier^	2024	2025–	—N/a	round 6, 2025	9	2	Profile	
79	Claudia Wright^	—N/a	2025–	—N/a	round 10, 2025	14	0	Profile	
80	Marlo Graham^	—N/a	2026–	—N/a	round 1, 2026	8	1	Profile	
81	Lily-Rose Williamson^	—N/a	2026–	—N/a	round 1, 2026	9	1	Profile	
82	Madison Evans^	—N/a	2026–	—N/a	round 4, 2026	1	0	Profile	
83	Asher Fearn-Wannon^	—N/a	2026–	—N/a	round 4, 2026	9	1	Profile	

== Other AFL Women's–listed players ==
=== Listed players yet to make their debut for Brisbane ===
Player	Date of birth	Acquired	Recruited from	Listed		Ref
Player	Date of birth	Acquired	Recruited from	Rookie	Senior	Ref
Lilly Baker	14 August 2006	No. 39 (academy without bid), 2024 AFL Women's draft	Brisbane Lions Academy/Maroochydore	—N/a	2025–	
Caitlin Kennedy	24 July 2002	Rookie signing, 2025	Tipperary GAA	2026–^{i: 2026}	—N/a	
Olivia Lacy	15 June 2007	No. 52, 2025 AFL Women's draft	Bendigo Pioneers	—N/a	2026–^{i: 2026}	
Meg Lappin	21 September 2007	No. 59 (father–daughter without bid), 2025 AFL Women's draft	Geelong Falcons	—N/a	2026–	
Keyshia Matenga	7 March 2002	Replacement signing, 2025	Wilston Grange	—N/a	2026–	

=== Formerly listed players who never played a senior game for Brisbane ===
Player	Date of birth	Acquired	Recruited from	Listed		Ref
Player	Date of birth	Acquired	Recruited from	Rookie	Senior	Ref
Caitlin Collins	15 June 1995	Free agent, 2016	Yeronga South Brisbane	—N/a	2017	
Jade Ransfield	3 August 1997	No. 128, 2016 AFL Women's draft	Yeronga South Brisbane	—N/a	2017	
Ruby Blair	1 August 1999	No. 41, 2017 AFL Women's draft	Coolangatta-Tweed Heads	—N/a	2018–2019	
Renee Cowan	16 October 1989	No. 23, 2017 AFL Women's draft	Yeronga South Brisbane	—N/a	2018	
Kalinda Howarth	2 August 1999	No. 31, 2017 AFL Women's draft	Coolangatta-Tweed Heads	—N/a	2018	
Molly Ritson	12 August 1999	No. 14, 2017 AFL Women's rookie draft	Bond University	2018	—N/a	
Krystal Scott	17 October 1994	No. 18, 2017 AFL Women's rookie draft	Bond University	2018–2019	—N/a	
Brianna McFarlane	2 December 2000	Rookie signing, 2018	Coolangatta-Tweed Heads	2019–2020	—N/a	
Hannah Hillman	14 April 1995	No. 17, 2019 AFL Women's draft	Coorparoo	—N/a	2020	
Beth Pinchin	6 September 1996	Replacement signing, 2020	Coolangatta-Tweed Heads	—N/a	2021	
Kiara Hillier	3 November 2004	No. 78, 2022 AFL Women's draft	Maroochydore	—N/a	2022 (S7)–2023	
Ava Seton	19 April 2004	Replacement signing, 2022	University of Queensland	—N/a	2022 (S7)	
Courtney Murphy	11 July 2000	Rookie signing, 2023 sup.	Long Beach State	2023	—N/a	
Brooke Sheridan	8 September 2004	Replacement signing, 2023 sup.	University of Queensland	—N/a	2023	
Jacinta Baldwick	14 November 2005	No. 37 (academy without bid), 2023 AFL Women's draft	Brisbane Lions Academy/Coorparoo	—N/a	2024–2025	
Indiana Williams	12 June 2005	No. 27 (academy with matched bid), 2023 AFL Women's draft	Brisbane Lions Academy/Maroochydore	—N/a	2024–2025	
