= 2009 Brisbane Lions season =

Coordinates: 27°29′9″S 153°2′17″E

Brisbane Lions
2009 season
- President: Tony Kelly
- Coach: Michael Voss
- Captain: Jonathan Brown
- Home ground: The Gabba
- NAB Cup: Quarter-finals
- AFL season: 6th
- Finals series: Semi-finals
- Best and Fairest: Jonathan Brown
- Leading goalkicker: Jonathan Brown (85)
- Highest home attendance: 34,912 vs. Collingwood (17 April 2009)
- Lowest home attendance: 23,750 vs. Melbourne (27 June 2009)
- Average home attendance: 29,467

This article covers the 2009 AFL season results for AFL team, the Brisbane Lions, based in Brisbane, Queensland, Australia.

== Squad for 2009 ==
Statistics are correct as of start of 2009 season.

Senior List
No.	Player	Hgt	Wgt	Date of birth	Age in 2009	Debut	Recruited from	Games	Goals
1	(Western Australia) Mitch Clark	198	95	19 October 1987	22	2006	East Fremantle	22	18
2	(Queensland) Albert Proud	180	83	6 September 1988	21	2007	Mount Gravatt	9	0
3	(Victoria (state)) Sam Sheldon	183	80	19 October 1987	22	2009	Hailebury College/Oakleigh U18	0	0
4	(Victoria (state)) Travis Johnstone	184	83	17 July 1980	29	1998	Chelsea/Dandenong U18/Melbourne	178	128
5	(Queensland) Scott Harding	181	82	19 June 1986	23	2006	Morningside	33	9
6	(Victoria (state)) Luke Power	179	78	8 January 1980	29	1998	Balwyn/Oakleigh U18	217	192
7	(Victoria (state)) Jed Adcock	184	85	15 November 1985	24	2004	Maryborough/North Ballarat U18	75	23
8	(Victoria (state)) Tim Notting	188	90	21 October 1978	31	1998	Navarre/Ballarat U18	196	132
9	(Western Australia) Ashley McGrath	182	81	20 May 1983	26	2001	South Fremantle	113	99
10	(Western Australia) Daniel Rich	184	83	7 June 1990	19	2009	Subiaco	0	0
11	(Tasmania) Justin Sherman	184	87	26 January 1987	22	2005	Clarence/Tasmania U18	73	43
12	(Western Australia) James Hawksley	187	77	5 February 1989	20	2008	Peel Thunder	4	0
13	(Western Australia) Kieran King	180	81	5 March 1991	18	****	East Fremantle	0	0
14	(Victoria (state)) Lachlan Henderson	196	92	14 December 1989	20	2007	Geelong U18	8	3
15	(Victoria (state)) Matt Tyler	194	85	20 January 1988	21	****	North Ballarat U18	0	0
16	(Victoria (state)) Jonathan Brown	195	102	29 October 1981	28	2000	Geelong U18	160	338
17	(Northern Territory) Jared Brennan	192	95	28 July 1984	25	2003	Southern Districts	81	56
18	(Western Australia) Todd Banfield	182	75	28 June 1990	19	****	Swan Districts	0	0
19	(Queensland) Jamie Charman	197	102	16 July 1982	27	2001	Northern Eagles	126	55
20	(Western Australia) Simon Black	186	83	3 April 1979	30	1998	East Fremantle	233	143
21	(Queensland) Daniel Merrett	196	104	12 December 1984	25	2005	Southport	68	16
22	(Tasmania) Tom Collier	192	84	25 March 1989	20	2008	Tasmanian Devils	6	1
23	(Western Australia) Matthew Leuenberger	203	98	7 June 1988	21	2007	East Perth	19	3
24	(South Australia) Joel Patfull	190	89	7 December 1984	25	2006	Norwood/Port Adelaide	58	19
25	(Tasmania) Bart McCulloch	199	86	23 September 1990	19	****	South Launceston	0	0
26	(Queensland) Joel Macdonald	187	88	10 October 1984	25	2004	Mount Gravatt	58	6
28	(Victoria (state)) Troy Selwood	187	85	1 May 1984	25	2005	Bendigo U18	60	8
29	(Northern Territory) Jason Roe	192	87	13 March 1984	25	2006	Cairns City Cobras/Collingwood/North Adelaide	42	6
30	(South Australia) Jack Redden	189	74	9 December 1990	19	2009	Glenelg	0	0
31	(Victoria (state)) James Polkinghorne	183	81	21 January 1989	20	2008	Calder U18	4	0
32	(Queensland) Cheynee Stiller	186	82	3 May 1986	23	2006	Northern Eagles	45	12
33	(Queensland) Rhan Hooper	177	78	9 January 1988	21	2006	Mount Gravatt	39	36
34	(Western Australia) Bradd Dalziell	184	82	15 March 1987	22	2008	East Fremantle	7	1
35	(Victoria (state)) Michael Rischitelli	184	82	8 January 1986	23	2005	Western U18	65	27
36	(Victoria (state)) Daniel Bradshaw	191	95	21 November 1978	31	1996	Wodonga/Brisbane Bears	201	438
37	(Victoria (state)) Matt Austin	187	75	30 March 1989	20	2009	North Ballarat U18	0	0
38	(Victoria (state)) Tom Rockliff	184	83	22 February 1990	19	2009	Murray Bushrangers U18	0	0
39	(Queensland) Josh Drummond	188	87	19 April 1983	26	2005	Northern Eagles	45	22
41	(Queensland) Scott Clouston	193	91	2 February 1987	22	2008	Morningside	2	1
42	(Republic of Ireland) Pearce Hanley	184	83	15 November 1988	21	2008	Ballaghaderreen (Ireland)	2	0
44	(Tasmania) Aaron Cornelius	192	86	25 May 1990	19	2009	Tassie Mariners U18	0	0
Rookie List
No.	Player	Hgt	Wgt	Date of birth	Age in 2009	Debut	Recruited from	Games	Goals
27	(Queensland) Pat Garner	194	96	16 March 1987	22	****	Western Magpies	0	0
43	(Western Australia) Daniel Murray	199	98	3 May 1990	19	****	East Perth	0	0
45	(Queensland) Daniel Dzufer	188	83	11 January 1988	21	2007	Suncoast Lions	1	0
46	(Queensland) Adam Spackman	184	80	4 March 1989	20	****	Morningside	0	0
47	(Queensland) Joel Tippett	194	88	26 October 1988	21	****	Southport	0	0

== Player Changes ==
=== In ===
Player	Original Club	League	via
(Australia) Daniel Rich	Subiaco Football Club	WAFL	2008 National draft – pick #7
(Australia) Jack Redden	Glenelg	SANFL	2008 National draft – pick #25
(Australia) Todd Banfield	Swan Districts	WAFL	2008 National draft – pick #41
(Australia) Aaron Cornelius	Tassie Devils	VFL	2008 National draft – pick #57
(Australia) Bart McCulloch	South Launceston Football Club	TFL	2008 National draft – pick #69
(Australia) Kieran King	East Fremantle	WAFL	2008 National draft – pick #81
(Australia) Tom Rockliff	Murray Bushrangers	TAC Cup	2009 Pre-Season draft – pick #5

=== Out ===
Player	New Club	League	via
(Australia) Beau McDonald	Brisbane Lions (assistant coach)	AFL	Retired
(Australia) Nigel Lappin	Geelong (assistant coach)	AFL	Retired
(Australia) Robert Copeland	Aspley Hornets	AFLQ	delisted
(Australia) Haydyn Kiel	Unknown	Unknown	delisted
(Australia) Matthew Moody	Unknown	Unknown	delisted
(Australia) Wayde Mills	Glenelg	SANFL	delisted
(Australia) Chris Schmidt	Adelaide	AFL	2008 Rookie draft – pick #26
(Australia) Anthony Corrie	Collingwood	AFL	2008 Trade Week
(Republic of Ireland) Colm Begley	St Kilda	AFL	2008 National draft – pick #83

== Ladder ==
2009 AFL ladder
Pos	Team	Pld	W	L	D	PF	PA	PP	Pts	
1	St Kilda	22	20	2	0	2197	1411	155.7	80	Finals series
2	Geelong (P)	22	18	4	0	2312	1815	127.4	72	Finals series
3	Western Bulldogs	22	15	7	0	2378	1940	122.6	60	Finals series
4	Collingwood	22	15	7	0	2174	1778	122.3	60	Finals series
5	Adelaide	22	14	8	0	2104	1789	117.6	56	Finals series
6	Brisbane Lions	22	13	8	1	2017	1890	106.7	54	Finals series
7	Carlton	22	13	9	0	2270	2055	110.5	52	Finals series
8	Essendon	22	10	11	1	2080	2127	97.8	42	Finals series
9	Hawthorn	22	9	13	0	1962	2120	92.5	36	
10	Port Adelaide	22	9	13	0	1990	2244	88.7	36	
11	West Coast	22	8	14	0	1893	2029	93.3	32	
12	Sydney	22	8	14	0	1888	2027	93.1	32	
13	North Melbourne	22	7	14	1	1680	2015	83.4	30	
14	Fremantle	22	6	16	0	1747	2259	77.3	24	
15	Richmond	22	5	16	1	1774	2388	74.3	22	
16	Melbourne	22	4	18	0	1706	2285	74.7	16	

Source: AFL ladder
Rules for classification: 1) points; 2) percentage; 3) number of points for.
(P) Premiers

== Results ==
=== NAB Cup ===
First round
14 February (6:10 pm)	Brisbane Lions	def.	St Kilda	Gold Coast Stadium (crowd: 6,013)	Report
0.2.3 (15); 1.6.6 (51); 1.8.6 (63); 1.8.8 (65)	Q1; Q2; Q3; Final	0.1.3 (9); 0.1.5 (11); 0.5.7 (37); 0.8.8 (56)	Umpires: Stevic, S Ryan, Pannell, B Ryan
Drummond	Super Goals	Nil
Harding 3, Notting, Sherman, Cornelius, Hooper, Clark	Goals	Milne 2, Goddard 2, Geary, R. Clarke, Steven, McEvoy
Johnstone, Brennan, Scott Harding, Dalziell, Drummond	Best	Goddard, Dal Santo, Geary, Ball, R. Clarke
Nil	Injuries	Eddy (knee)
Nil	Reports	Nil

Quarter-finals
27 February (7:40 pm)	Essendon	def.	Brisbane Lions	Telstra Dome (crowd: 12,260)	Report
0.3.2 (20); 0.4.7 (31); 0.6.10 (46); 0.9.13 (67)	Q1; Q2; Q3; Final	1.0.4 (13); 1.1.5 (20); 1.5.6 (45); 1.7.14 (65)	Umpires: McBurney, Jeffery, Findlay
Nil	Super Goals	Harding
Lovett 2, Neagle, Hocking, Monfries, Skipworth, Jetta, Myers, Hille	Goals	Bradshaw 3, Clark 2, Sherman, McGrath
Skipworth, Hille, Lovett, Winderlich, Watson, Lloyd, Lonergan	Best	Drummond, Dalziell, Bradshaw, McGrath, Macdonald, Adcock
McVeigh (ankle)	Injuries	Leuenberger (knee)

=== Home and Away Season ===
Round 1
28 March (6:10 pm)	Brisbane Lions	def.	West Coast	The Gabba (crowd: 26,800)	Report
2.1 (13); 5.3 (33); 14.6 (90); 14.11 (95)	Q1; Q2; Q3; Final	6.2 (38); 9.4 (58); 11.8 (74); 13.8 (86)	Umpires: Kennedy, Stewart, Avon
Hooper 4, Bradshaw 3, Brown 3, Johnstone 2, Rischitelli, McGrath	Goals	LeCras 6, Hansen 3, Cox, Kerr, Hurn, Lynch
Johnstone, Hooper, Power, Patfull, Dalziell, Macdonald	Best	LeCras, Hurn, Cox, Wirrpanda, Masten, Hansen
Black (wrist) replaced in selected side by Charman	Injuries	Nil
Nil	Reports	Nil

Round 2
4 April (7:10 pm)	Carlton	def.	Brisbane Lions	Etihad Stadium (crowd: 42,496)	Report
3.2 (20); 11.5 (71); 13.8 (86); 18.11 (119)	Q1; Q2; Q3; Final	3.3 (21); 4.6 (30); 10.8 (68); 15.10 (100)	Umpires: Rosebury, Chamberlain, Keating
Fevola 5, Betts 3, Murphy 3, Cloke 2, Gibbs 2, Hadley, Houlihan, Judd	Goals	Bradshaw 6, Brown 3, Hooper 2, Sherman 2, Johnstone, McGrath
Gibbs, Judd, Murphy, Fevola, Hadley, Kreuzer, Waite, Houlihan	Best	Power, Bradshaw, Black, Drummond, Brown, Rich, Adcock
Jamison (shoulder)	Injuries	McGrath (corked thigh), Clark (thigh), Hooper (ankle), Selwood (head knock)
Nil	Reports	Brown reported by emergency umpire Troy Pannell in the fourth quarter for rough conduct on Murphy

Round 3
11 April (7:40 pm)	Brisbane Lions	def.	Sydney	The Gabba (crowd: 24,984)	Report
4.4 (28); 10.6 (66); 12.9 (81); 15.10 (100)	Q1; Q2; Q3; Final	1.2 (8); 4.5 (29); 7.10 (52); 9.13 (67)	Umpires: Ryan, Meredith, McInerney
Brown 4, Bradshaw 4, Sherman 3, Rich, Drummond, Notting, Adcock	Goals	Hall 3, Jolly 2, White, Meredith, Barlow, Moore
Patfull, Drummond, Brown, Selwood, Adcock, Macdonald	Best	Bolton, Bevan, Shaw, Jack, Jolly, Hall
Leuenberger (knee)	Injuries	Crouch (hamstring)
Nil	Reports	Nil

Round 4
17 April (7:40 pm)	Brisbane Lions	def. by	Collingwood	The Gabba (crowd: 34,912)	Report
6.2 (38); 9.4 (58); 10.8 (68); 10.13 (73)	Q1; Q2; Q3; Final	2.4 (16); 7.6 (48); 9.10 (64); 13.12 (90)	Umpires: Rosebury, McLaren, Grun
Brown 2, Dalziell 2, Selwood 2, Adcock, Clark, Notting, Rischitelli	Goals	Medhurst 4, Davis 3, Lockyer 2, Anthony, Cloke, Swan, Thomas
Adcock, Dalziell, Power, Rich, Rischitelli, Clark	Best	Medhurst, Pendlebury, Barham, Davis, O'Brien, Cox
Charman (ankle)	Injuries	TBC
Nil	Reports	Nil

Round 5
26 April (1:10 pm)	Geelong	def.	Brisbane Lions	Skilled Stadium (crowd: 15,580)	Report
5.4 (34); 13.8 (86); 15.11 (101); 18.18 (126)	Q1; Q2; Q3; Final	0.2 (2); 3.3 (21); 4.3 (27); 5.3 (33)	Umpires: McBurney, Kamolins, Findlay
Hawkins 3, Mooney 3, Stokes 3, Ablett 2, Byrnes 2, Rooke 2, Bartel, S. Johnson, Varcoe	Goals	Brown 3, Rich, Sherman
Ablett, Mooney, J. Selwood, Hawkins, Mackie, Blake, Enright, Byrnes	Best	Black, Patfull, Brown, Adcock
Nil	Reports	Nil

Round 6
2 May (7:10 pm)	Brisbane Lions	def.	Essendon	The Gabba (crowd: 29,252)	Report
5.2 (32); 10.2 (62); 12.6 (78); 17.9 (111)	Q1; Q2; Q3; Final	1.3 (9); 3.8 (26); 5.12 (42); 9.14 (68)	Umpires: Rosebury, Hay, Avon
Brown 5, Bradshaw 4, Power 3, Selwood, Brennan, Sherman, Rischitelli, Harding	Goals	Lloyd 2, Winderlich 2, Lovett, Hocking, Lovett-Murray, Zaharakis, Lonergan
Brown, Johnstone, Black, Power, Selwood, Clark	Best	Watson, Lovett-Murray, Hocking, Stanton, Lovett, Winderlich
Nil	Injuries	Fletcher (ankle)
Nil	Reports	Nil

	Round 7
9 May (2:10 pm)	Richmond 10.11 (71)	def. by	Brisbane Lions 15.7 (97)	Melbourne Cricket Ground (crowd: 34,646)	Report

	Round 8
16 May (7:10 pm)	Brisbane Lions 18.11 (119)	def.	Adelaide 12.11 (83)	The Gabba (crowd: 27,767)	Report

	Round 9
24 May (2:10 pm)	St Kilda 14.13 (97)	def.	Brisbane Lions 13.3 (81)	Etihad Stadium (crowd: 30,673)	Report

	Round 10
30 May (2:10 pm)	North Melbourne 12.9 (81)	def. by	Brisbane Lions 15.9 (99)	Etihad Stadium (crowd: 21,583)	Report

	Round 11
6 June (7:10 pm)	Brisbane Lions 16.10 (106)	def. by	Carlton 16.16 (112)	The Gabba (crowd: 33,790)	Report

	Round 12
14 June (1:10 pm)	Hawthorn 7.9 (51)	def. by	Brisbane Lions 13.15 (93)	Aurora Stadium (crowd: 16,710)	Report

	Round 13
27 June (7:10 pm)	Brisbane Lions 16.15 (111)	def.	Melbourne 8.8 (56)	The Gabba (crowd: 23,750)	Report

	Round 14
4 July (2:40 pm)	Port Adelaide 19.14 (128)	def.	Brisbane Lions 11.14 (80)	AAMI Stadium (crowd: 20,293)	Report

	Round 15
11 July (7:10 pm)	Brisbane Lions 16.12 (108)	def.	Geelong 9.11 (65)	The Gabba (crowd: 34,274)	Report

	Round 16
18 July (5:40 pm)	Fremantle 7.5 (47)	def. by	Brisbane Lions 9.8 (62)	Subiaco Oval (crowd: 22,595)	Report

	Round 17
25 July (7:10 pm)	Brisbane Lions 17.14 (116)	def.	North Melbourne 11.9 (75)	The Gabba (crowd: 25,509)	Report

	Round 18
1 August (7:10 pm)	Collingwood 12.23 (95)	def.	Brisbane Lions 8.7 (55)	Melbourne Cricket Ground (crowd: 47,268)	Report

	Round 19
8 August (7:10 pm)	Essendon 13.9 (87)	drew with	Brisbane Lions 12.15 (87)	Melbourne Cricket Ground (crowd: 41,636)	Report

	Round 20
15 August (7:10 pm)	Brisbane Lions 12.12 (84)	def. by	Western Bulldogs 15.12 (102)	The Gabba (crowd: 33,421)	Report

	Round 21
22 August (7:10 pm)	Brisbane Lions 16.11 (107)	def.	Port Adelaide 14.8 (92)	The Gabba (crowd: 26,437)	Report

	Round 22
29 August (7:10 pm)	Sydney 14.8 (92)	def. by	Brisbane Lions 15.10 (100)	Sydney Cricket Ground (crowd: 27,933)	Report

=== Finals series ===
==== Week 1 ====
Second Elimination Final
5 September 7:30 pm	Brisbane Lions	def.	Carlton	The Gabba (crowd: 32,702)	Report
4.4 (28); 8.7 (55); 10.10 (70); 16.15 (111)	Q1; Q2; Q3; Final	5.4 (34); 8.6 (54); 14.10 (94); 15.14 (104)	Umpires: McLaren, Wenn, Jeffery; Television broadcast: Ten / One
Bradshaw 5, Brown 4, Johnstone 2, Sherman 2, Redden, Hooper, Rich	Goals	Fevola 3, Stevens 2, Cloke 2, Betts, Carrazzo, Garlett, Houlihan, Judd, Kreuzer, Murphy, Russell
Black, Bradshaw, Brown, Clark, Sherman, McGrath	Best	Judd, Fevola, Murphy, Kreuzer, Stevens, Carrazzo
Drummond (quad), Macdonald (TBA)	Injuries	Joseph (ankle)
Nil	Reports	Nil

==== Week 2 ====
Second Semi-final
11 September 7:45 pm	Western Bulldogs	def.	Brisbane Lions	MCG (crowd: 47,030)	Report
4.2 (26); 6.6 (42); 11.8 (74); 16.11 (107)	Q1; Q2; Q3; Final	0.6 (6); 3.7 (25); 5.7 (37); 8.8 (56)	Umpires: Stevic, S. Ryan, Meredith; Television broadcast: Seven
Hahn 4, Eagleton 3, Ward 2, Higgins 2, Cooney, Akermanis, Gilbee, Griffen, Minson	Goals	Brown 3, Bradshaw 3, McGrath, Redden
Boyd, Cooney, Eagleton, Cross, Hargrave, Giansiracusa, Akermanis	Best	Power, Brown, Merrett, Brennan, Clark, Hawksley
Griffen (corked calf)	Injuries	Nil
Nil	Reports	Nil

== Statistics ==
=== Leading Goalkickers ===
Rank	Player	Goals	Finals	Best Performance	
Rank	Player	Goals	Finals	Goals	Round and Opponent
1	Jonathan Brown	78	7	8	Round 17 v North Melbourne
2	Daniel Bradshaw	50	8	6	Round 2 v Carlton
3	Justin Sherman	28	2	3	Round 3 v Sydney; Round 8 v Adelaide
4	James Polkinghorne	15	0	2	Round 8 v Adelaide; Round 9 v St Kilda; Round 10 v North Melbourne; Round 13 v Melbourne; Round 15 v Geelong; Round 17 v North Melbourne
5	Daniel Rich	13	1	2	Round 13 v Melbourne; Round 18 v Essendon

== Milestones ==
Round	Player	Milestone
1	Daniel Rich	Debut
6	Sam Sheldon	Debut
9	Aaron Cornelius	Debut
10	Tim Notting	200 games
15	Jack Redden	Debut
17	Jonathan Brown	400 goals
18	Simon Black	250 games
18	Tom Rockliff	Debut
Elimination Final	Jared Brennan	100 games
Elimination Final	Jason Roe	50 games

== Awards ==
Award	Recipient	Awarded by
2009 AFL Rising Star	Daniel Rich	AFL
AFLPA Award for Best First Year Player	Daniel Rich	AFL
AFLPA Award for Best Captain	Jonathan Brown	AFL
Member of the 2009 All-Australian team (Half-forward flank)	Jonathan Brown	AFL
