= Simon Hawking =

Australian rules footballer

Personal information
- Full name: Simon Hawking
- Born: 5 March 1973 (age 53)
- Height: 193 cm (6 ft 4 in)
- Weight: 86 kg (190 lb)

Playing career^{1}
Years	Club	Games (Goals)
1993–1996	Fitzroy	60 (30)
1997	Brisbane Lions	0 (0)
1998	Sydney Swans	0 (0)
2000	Collingwood	0 (0)
- ^{1} Playing statistics correct to the end of 2000.

Career highlights
- AFL Rising Star nominee: 1994

Simon Hawking (born 5 March 1973) is a former Australian rules footballer who played with Fitzroy in the Australian Football League (AFL).

Hawking was a key position player and made seven appearances for Fitzroy in 1993, his first season. He played all 22 games the following year, as a defender. His efforts at fullback in Fitzroy's round 13 against Hawthorn at Waverley Park, where he kept Jason Dunstall goalless, earned him a 1994 AFL Rising Star nomination. He took 10 marks and had 20 disposals in the win. Hawking was third in the 'best and fairest' award for the '94 season.

At the end of 1996, the Brisbane Lions were formed, and Hawking was one of the Fitzroy players selected to join the new club. He had been recommended to Brisbane by his former Fitzroy teammate Alastair Lynch and needed a knee reconstruction before arriving at Brisbane. Hawking was one of eight players that the Lions picked up from Fitzroy's list, but would be the only one not to play an AFL match. He had been an emergency for the club's first ever league game in 1997.

Brisbane traded him to the Sydney Swans, along with Brent Green, in return for the 31st selection of the 1997 AFL draft, used on future Brownlow Medalist Simon Black. Plagued by injuries, Hawking didn't make any league appearances for the Swans and retired at the end of the '98 season. After a year out of football he made a return to the AFL, being secured by Collingwood with the 10th selection of the 2000 Pre-season Draft. He was again plagued by injuries and unable to make it into the seniors, announced his (permanent) retirement, four years after playing his last AFL game.
