= Luke Weller =

Australian rules footballer

Personal information
- Full name: Luke Weller
- Born: 13 January 1982 (age 44)
- Original team: Northern Eagles (AFLSQ)
- Height: 190 cm (6 ft 3 in)
- Weight: 93 kg (205 lb)

Playing career^{1}
Years	Club	Games (Goals)
2001–2003	Brisbane Lions	4 (1)
2004	Richmond	7 (3)
Total		11 (4)
- ^{1} Playing statistics correct to the end of 2004.

Luke Weller (born 13 January 1982) is an Australian rules footballer who played with the Brisbane Lions and Richmond in the Australian Football League (AFL).

Originally from AFL South Queensland club the Northern Eagles, Weller was drafted by Brisbane with pick 68 of the 2001 AFL rookie draft and was promoted to the seniors during the 2003 AFL season when Anthony Corrie was put on the long-term injury list. A key position player, he was used mainly as a defender in his four games that year.

Having been delisted by Brisbane, Weller was selected by Richmond in the 2004 Pre-season Draft, with pick 11. He played only seven league games for Richmond and then returned to his original Queensland club, the Zillmere Eagles.

Weller joined West Australian Football League (WAFL) club East Fremantle in 2007, winning the 2010 Lynn Medal, as East Fremantle's best and fairest player.
