= Shaleise Law =

Australian rules footballer (born 1998)

Personal information
- Full name: Shaleise Law
- Born: 24 July 1998 (age 28); Townsville, Queensland
- Original team: Zillmere (QWAFL)
- Draft: No. 95, 2016 AFL Women's draft
- Debut: Round 1, 2017, Brisbane vs. Melbourne, at Casey Fields
- Height: 162 cm (5 ft 4 in)
- Position: Forward

Playing career^{1}
Years	Club	Games (Goals)
2017	Brisbane	3 (0)
- ^{1} Playing statistics correct to the end of 2017.

Shaleise Law (born 24 July 1998) is an Australian rules footballer who last played for the Brisbane Lions in the AFL Women's.

== Early life ==
Of Wakka Wakka and Kamilaroi ancestry, Law was born in 1998 in Townsville, Queensland. She was playing for Zillmere when she was drafted.

== AFLW career ==
Law was recruited by Brisbane with the number 95 pick in the 2016 AFL Women's draft. She made her debut in the Lions' inaugural game against Melbourne at Casey Fields on 5 February 2017.

Law was delisted by Brisbane at the end of the 2017 season.

== Statistics ==
Legend
G	Goals	K	Kicks	D	Disposals	T	Tackles
B	Behinds	H	Handballs	M	Marks

Season	Team	No.	Games	Totals							Averages (per game)							Votes
Season	Team	No.	Games	G	B	K	H	D	M	T	G	B	K	H	D	M	T	Votes
2017	Brisbane	2	3	0	0	5	0	5	1	0	0.0	0.0	1.7	0.0	1.7	0.3	0.0	0
Career			3	0	0	5	0	5	1	0	0.0	0.0	1.7	0.0	1.7	0.3	0.0	0
