= Kate Deegan =

Australian rules footballer

Personal information
- Full name: Kate Deegan
- Born: 14 September 1996 (age 30)
- Original team: Coorparoo (QWAFL)
- Draft: Rookie player, 2016
- Debut: Round 4, 2017, Brisbane vs. Greater Western Sydney, at South Pine Sports Complex
- Height: 172 cm (5 ft 8 in)
- Position: Defender

Playing career^{1}
Years	Club	Games (Goals)
2017	Brisbane	1 (0)
- ^{1} Playing statistics correct to the end of 2017.

Kate Deegan (born 14 September 1996) is an Australian rules footballer who last played for the Brisbane Lions in the AFL Women's.

== Early life ==
Deegan was born in 1996. She was playing for Coorparoo when she was drafted. She has a soccer background, and has played for Annerley in the Brisbane Women's Premier League.

== AFLW career ==
Deegan was recruited by Brisbane as a rookie player before the 2017 season. She made her debut in the Lions' round 4 game against Greater Western Sydney at the South Pine Sports Complex on 25 February 2017.

Deegan was delisted by Brisbane at the end of the 2017 season.
