= Michael Close =

Australian rules footballer

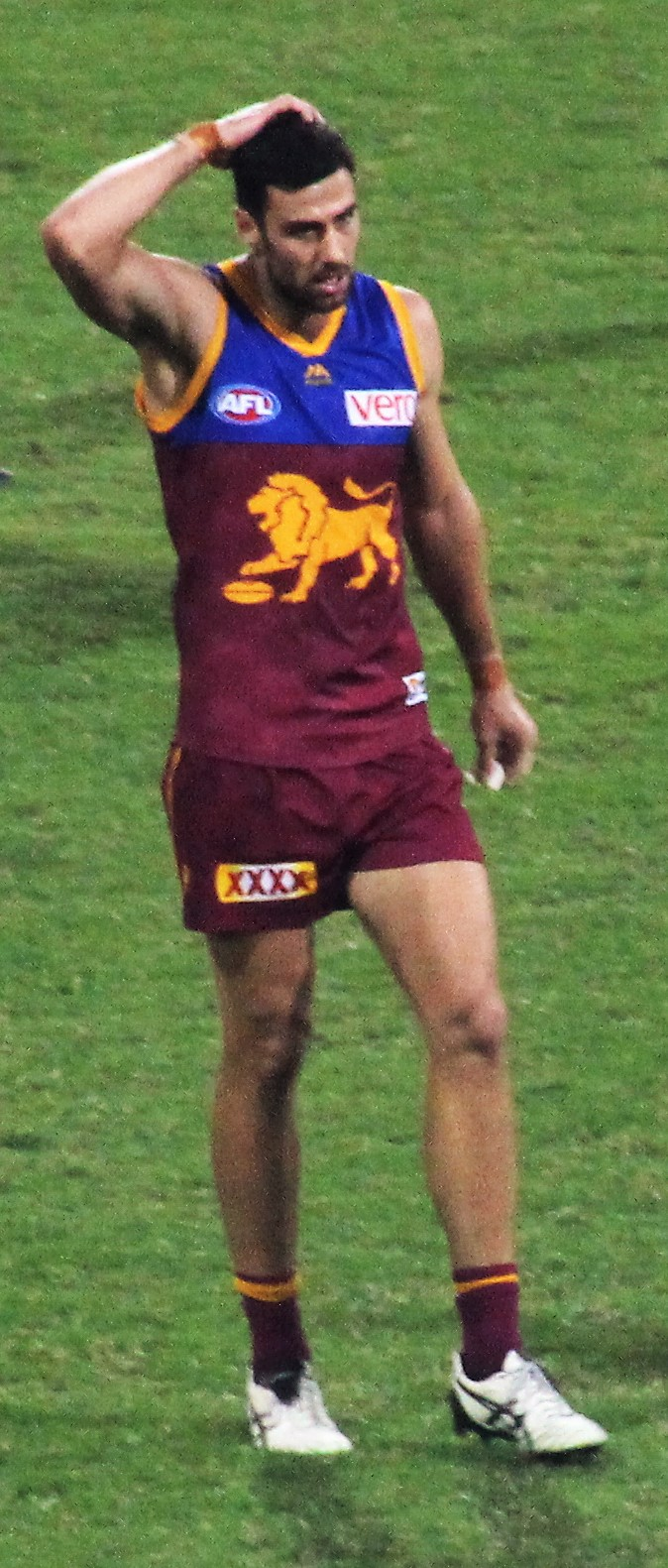
- Close at a game for the Lions against Port Adelaide in April 2017

Personal information
- Full name: Michael Close
- Born: 30 July 1994 (age 32)
- Original team: North Ballarat Rebels (TAC Cup)
- Draft: No. 32, 2012 national draft
- Height: 197 cm (6 ft 6 in)
- Weight: 98 kg (216 lb)
- Position: Full-forward

Playing career^{1}
Years	Club	Games (Goals)
2013–2017	Brisbane Lions	27 (24)
- ^{1} Playing statistics correct to the end of 2017.

Michael Close (born 30 July 1994) is a former professional Australian rules footballer who played for the Brisbane Lions in the Australian Football League (AFL).

== AFL career ==
From Harrow, Victoria, Close was drafted by Brisbane at Pick 32 in the 2012 AFL National Draft. made his AFL debut for Brisbane in the Round 1 match against Hawthorn in the 2014 AFL season. In October 2017, Close was delisted by Brisbane.
