= Jessy Keeffe =

Australian rules footballer

Personal information
- Born: 17 July 1996 (age 30)
- Original team: Yeronga South Brisbane (QWAFL)
- Draft: No. 48, 2017 AFL Women's draft
- Debut: Round 4, 2019, Brisbane vs. Western Bulldogs, at Whitten Oval
- Height: 187 cm (6 ft 2 in)
- Position: Ruck
- Other occupation: Personal trainer

Playing career^{1}
| Years | Club | Games (Goals) |
| 2018–2021 | Brisbane | 11 (0) |
- ^{1} Playing statistics correct to the end of the 2021 season.

Jessy Keeffe (born 17 July 1996) is a retired Australian rules footballer who played for Brisbane in the AFL Women's competition (AFLW). She was playing for Yeronga South Brisbane in the AFL Queensland Women's League (QWAFL) when she was drafted by Brisbane with the 48th and final pick in the 2017 AFL Women's draft.

After not playing a game in her first AFLW season in 2018, she was delisted by Brisbane. However, they re-signed her as a free agent before the 2019 season, and she made her AFLW debut in the Lions' round 4 game against Western Bulldogs at Whitten Oval on 23 February 2019.

At the end of the 2021 season, Keeffe announced her retirement after 11 games with the Lions, citing mental health challenges.

Her brother, Lachlan Keeffe, plays for the Greater Western Sydney Giants in the Australian Football League.

== Statistics ==
Legend
| G | Goals | K | Kicks | D | Disposals | T | Tackles |
| B | Behinds | H | Handballs | M | Marks | H/O | Hit-outs |

| Season | Team | No. | Games | Totals | | | | | | | | Averages (per game) | | | | | | | | Votes |
| Season | Team | No. | Games | G | B | K | H | D | M | T | H/O | G | B | K | H | D | M | T | H/O | Votes |
|---|---|---|---|---|---|---|---|---|---|---|---|---|---|---|---|---|---|---|---|---|
| 2018 | Brisbane | 27 | 0 | — | — | — | — | — | — | — | — | — | — | — | — | — | — | — | — | 0 |
| 2019 | Brisbane | 27 | 4 | 0 | 0 | 4 | 14 | 18 | 1 | 14 | 73 | 0.0 | 0.0 | 1.0 | 3.5 | 4.5 | 0.3 | 3.5 | 18.3 | 0 |
| 2020 | Brisbane | 27 | 7 | 0 | 1 | 9 | 18 | 27 | 3 | 18 | 114 | 0.0 | 0.1 | 1.3 | 2.6 | 3.9 | 0.4 | 2.6 | 16.3 | 0 |
| 2021 | Brisbane | 27 | 0 | — | — | — | — | — | — | — | — | — | — | — | — | — | — | — | — | 0 |
| Career | | | 11 | 0 | 1 | 13 | 32 | 45 | 4 | 32 | 187 | 0.0 | 0.1 | 1.2 | 2.9 | 4.1 | 0.4 | 2.9 | 17.0 | 0 |
