= Derek Wirth =

Australian rules footballer

Personal information
- Full name: Derek Wirth
- Born: 29 November 1978 (age 47)
- Original team: Mount Gravatt
- Height: 193 cm (6 ft 4 in)
- Weight: 94 kg (207 lb)

Playing career^{1}
Years	Club	Games (Goals)
1996	Brisbane Bears	0 (0)
1997–1998	Brisbane Lions	1 (2)
1999	Geelong	0 (0)
- ^{1} Playing statistics correct to the end of 1999.

Derek Wirth (born 29 November 1978) is a former Australian rules footballer who played with the Brisbane Lions in the Australian Football League (AFL).

A Springwood junior, Wirth was a key position player, originally drafted to the Brisbane Bears. He was recruited from Mount Gravatt, as one of three zone selections in the 1995 AFL draft. He didn't play a league game for Brisbane in 1996 and at the end of the year was signed by the Lions, who were formed from a merger between the Bears and Fitzroy.

He spent two years with the Lions and in his second season finally made his debut, against Melbourne at the MCG in round 18. Wirth scored twice and was one of just two multiple goal scorers for Brisbane, however he was dropped from the starting lineup after a 95-point defeat. It was the only AFL game he would play, despite also spending a year at Geelong, who had picked him up in the rookie draft.

In 2000 he was a member of the Redland team which competed in their inaugural Queensland State League season. He went on to make over 100 appearances with the club and served as captain from 2003 to 2005.
