= Nathan Clarke (Australian footballer) =

Australian rules footballer

Personal information
- Full name: Nathan Clarke
- Born: 27 October 1979 (age 47)
- Original team: Maroochydore
- Height: 186 cm (6 ft 1 in)
- Weight: 80 kg (176 lb)

Playing career^{1}
| Years | Club | Games (Goals) |
| 2000–2002 | Brisbane Lions (AFL) | 6 (4) |
| 2004–2010 | Eastlake (AFL Canberra) | 1+ (?) |
| 2011 | Brisbane Lions (NEAFL) | 1 (4) |

Coaching career^{3}
| Years | Club | Games (W–L–D) |
| 2004–2010 | Eastlake (AFL Canberra) | |
| 2011–2012 | Brisbane Lions (NEAFL) | 40 (22–17–1) |
- ^{1} Playing statistics correct to the end of 2001.^{3} Coaching statistics correct as of 2012.

Nathan Clarke (born 27 October 1979) is a former Australian rules footballer who played with the Brisbane Lions in the Australian Football League (AFL).

Clarke was recruited by Brisbane through the rookie draft, from Maroochydore in Queensland. His father, Barry, is a half forward flanker in the state's official Team of the Century.

A utility, he played his first game late in the 2000 AFL season, against Hawthorn at the Gabba. In a memorable league debut, Clarke kicked two goals, took 10 marks and had 18 disposals. After appearing just twice in 2001, a Brisbane premiership year, he was delisted by the Lions. Clarke then nominated for the 2001 AFL draft and was redrafted by Brisbane with pick 45, which they had received in the Trent Knobel trade. He wasn't able to break into the seniors in 2002 and was delisted again, at the end of the year.

He coached the Brisbane Lions reserves side, who compete in the North East Australian Football League Northern Conference, to two premierships in 2011 and 2012. Previously, he played in Canberra, where he captain-coached Eastlake.
