= James Madden (footballer) =

Australian rules footballer

Personal information
- Full name: James Madden
- Born: 15 November 1999 (age 26)
- Original teams: Ballyboden St Enda's (club); Dublin (minor, county team)
- Height: 188 cm (6 ft 2 in)
- Weight: 88 kg (194 lb)

Playing career^{1}
| Years | Club | Games (Goals) |
| 2021–2024 | Brisbane Lions | 11 (1) |
- ^{1} Playing statistics correct to the end of the 2022 season.

James Madden (born 15 November 1999) is an Irish former professional Australian rules football (AFL) player who last played for the Brisbane Lions in the Australian Football League. Madden is a former Gaelic footballer, who played for the Ballyboden St Enda's club and also the Dublin county team in the All-Ireland Minor Football Championship. Madden kicked his first AFL goal in the Lions' win in a match against Richmond on 21 May 2021.

== Statistics ==
Updated to the end of the 2022 season.

Legend
| G | Goals | K | Kicks | D | Disposals | T | Tackles |
| B | Behinds | H | Handballs | M | Marks |

| Season | Team | No. | Games | Totals | | | | | | | Averages (per game) | | | | | | |
| Season | Team | No. | Games | G | B | K | H | D | M | T | G | B | K | H | D | M | T |
|---|---|---|---|---|---|---|---|---|---|---|---|---|---|---|---|---|---|
| 2021 | Brisbane Lions | 42 | 9 | 1 | 0 | 49 | 50 | 99 | 25 | 16 | 0.1 | 0.0 | 5.4 | 5.6 | 11.0 | 2.8 | 1.8 |
| 2022 | Brisbane Lions | 14 | 2 | 0 | 0 | 10 | 4 | 14 | 7 | 3 | 0.0 | 0.0 | 5.0 | 2.0 | 7.0 | 3.5 | 1.5 |
| Career | | | 11 | 1 | 0 | 59 | 54 | 113 | 32 | 19 | 0.1 | 0.0 | 5.4 | 4.9 | 10.3 | 2.9 | 1.7 |
