= Marty Pask =

Australian rules footballer (born 1985)

Personal information
- Full name: Martin Pask
- Born: 2 January 1985 (age 41)
- Original team: Western Magpies
- Height: 194 cm (6 ft 4 in)
- Weight: 97 kg (214 lb)

Playing career^{1}
Years	Club	Games (Goals)
2006	Brisbane Lions	8 (4)
- ^{1} Playing statistics correct to the end of 2006.

Martin "Marty" Pask (born 2 January 1985) is a former Australian rules footballer in the Australian Football League for the Brisbane Lions. After his AFL career finished he played in the Victorian Football League with the Werribee Tigers.

Pask also played representative football; four times representing Queensland, twice representing Victoria (1 VAFA & 1 VFL) and once with the Allies state of origin side.

Pask is also a regular media performer with the ABC as a commentator during the AFL home and away season.

Marty has built key sporting businesses and grown a portfolio of athletes. Marty reportedly connects well with people and is praised for his ability to negotiate key commercial sponsorship contracts.

== Sports agent ==
Pask is now an agent and handled the careers of former footballers, including Michael Barlow, Brian Lake, Nathan Vardy, Jason Winderlich and Clay Smith. He currently manages Dion Prestia, Brandon Ellis and Dyson Heppell.

Other athletes include Emily Seebohm who is an Olympic World Recorder holder in the 100m backstroke.

== AFLQ career ==
Pask began his career at the Western Magpies and in 2004 won the National Australia Bank AFLQ Rising Star Award as well as finishing runner-up in the Western Magpies Best and Fairest. Following this season Pask was selected by the Brisbane Lions in the National Draft.

== Brisbane Lions ==
Pask was into his second year on the Lions' list before he was elevated to the Brisbane Lions Senior team in May 2006. Pask played eight senior games for the Lions before succumbing to injury which derailed his momentum. Pask then struggled to find pace and consistency after tearing his hamstring and reinjuring it several times.

== Western Bulldogs ==
He was selected by the Western Bulldogs in September 2007 hoping to a change of environment would fix his injury concerns. Pask was released from his contract after playing a full season with the Bulldogs' affiliate the Werribee Tigers, without making his AFL debut for the Bulldogs.

== VFL career ==
Pask played four seasons in the Victorian Football League with Werribee. His best season was 2007 when he finished third in their 2007 Best and Fairest award. That year Pask also polled well in the Liston Medal earning the most votes for the Tigers, finishing twelfth.

== VAFA career ==
After Pask was released from the Western Bulldogs, Pask joined VAFA club University Blacks after rejecting offers from AFLQ, SANFL and VFL clubs. Pask represented the VAFA Victorian side and finished with 44 goals in 10 games of football.

== EDFL career ==
Pask retired from semi-professional football in 2010. Upon his decision to leave the Werribee Tigers he decided to sign with Keilor Football Club for the 2011 season.
