= Will Hamill (footballer, born 1986) =

Australian rules footballer (born 1986)

Personal information
- Full name: Will Hamill
- Born: 26 July 1986 (age 40)
- Original team: Mount Gravatt
- Height: 189 cm (6 ft 2 in)
- Weight: 74 kg (163 lb)

Playing career^{1}
Years	Club	Games (Goals)
2007	Brisbane Lions	3 (1)
- ^{1} Playing statistics correct to the end of 2007.

Will Hamill (born 26 July 1986) is an Australian rules footballer who played with the Brisbane Lions in the Australian Football League (AFL).

Hamill captained the Queensland Under-18s football team in 2004 and was first rookie listed by Brisbane the same year. The Mount Gravatt player then started playing for the Brisbane reserves side in the AFL Queensland State League and was elevated to the seniors during the 2007 AFL season, due to Daniel Bradshaw going on the long-term injury list.

He played his first AFL game in Brisbane's round 14 win over the West Coast Eagles at Subiaco Oval, sharing his debut with ruckman Matthew Leuenberger. Hamill had just six disposals but appeared again the following week, when Brisbane beat Melbourne at home. He had ten disposals in that game and kept his spot in the team which took on Carlton. In a record 117 point win, Hamill managed 12 disposals and kicked a goal in the dying minutes, where all attention was on whether Jonathan Brown could kick 10 people.
