= Stephen Wrigley =

Australian rules footballer

Personal information
- Full name: Stephen Wrigley
- Born: 18 April 1987 (age 39)
- Original team: Labrador (NEAFL)
- Draft: No. 22, 2012 rookie draft, Brisbane Lions
- Height: 187 cm (6 ft 2 in)
- Weight: 83 kg (183 lb)

Playing career^{1}
Years	Club	Games (Goals)
2012–2013	Brisbane Lions	3 (0)
- ^{1} Playing statistics correct to the end of 2013.

Career highlights
- NEAFL premiership player: 2012

Stephen Wrigley (born 18 April 1987) is a former professional Australian rules football player at the Brisbane Lions in the Australian Football League (AFL). He was recruited by the club in the 2012 Rookie draft, with pick #22. Wrigley made his debut in Round 18, 2012, against West Coast at Subiaco Oval.

He was delisted by the Brisbane Lions at the end of the 2013 season.
