= Shannon Rusca =

Australian rules footballer

Personal information
- Full name: Shannon Rusca
- Born: 20 August 1980 (age 46)
- Original team: Southern Districts
- Height: 182 cm (6 ft 0 in)
- Weight: 82 kg (181 lb)

Playing career^{1}
Years	Club	Games (Goals)
2000–2001	Brisbane Lions	2 (0)
2002	Western Bulldogs	0 (0)
- ^{1} Playing statistics correct to the end of 2002.

Shannon Rusca is a former professional Australian rules football player.

== Early life ==
Rusca began playing senior Australian Football with Southern Districts in the Northern Territory Football League.

== AFL career ==
He was listed on the rookie list by the Brisbane Lions in 2000 before being elevated during the season. During the 2000 AFL season he played two matches.

Rusca was traded to the Western Bulldogs for selection 49 in the 2001 AFL draft. He did not play a senior match for the Bulldogs.

== Post AFL ==
Rusca played for the Northern Territory Thunder in the Queensland AFL and Southern Districts in the NTFL.

Rusca was a playing coach with Southern Districts during the 2008/2009 NTFL season.
