= Nick Trask =

Australian rules footballer

Personal information
- Full name: Nicholas Trask
- Born: 6 February 1978 (age 48)
- Original team: Eastern Ranges
- Draft: 28th, 1995 AFL draft
- Height: 175 cm (5 ft 9 in)
- Weight: 76 kg (168 lb)

Playing career^{1}
Years	Club	Games (Goals)
1997–1998	Brisbane Lions	12 (3)
- ^{1} Playing statistics correct to the end of 1998.

Nick Trask (born 6 February 1978) is a former Australian rules footballer who played with the Brisbane Lions in the Australian Football League (AFL).

Trask played for the Eastern Ranges in the TAC Cup and also at Vermont, before being drafted to the AFL.

Selected with pick 28 in the 1995 AFL draft, Trask played four games midway through the season and was then recalled for Brisbane's qualifying final at Waverley Park.

He appeared in the seniors a further seven times in 1997 before being delisted.

Trask played with Wangaratta Rovers in the Ovens & Murray Football League in 2001 and 2002, kicking 64 goals.
