= Jacob Allison =

Australian rules footballer

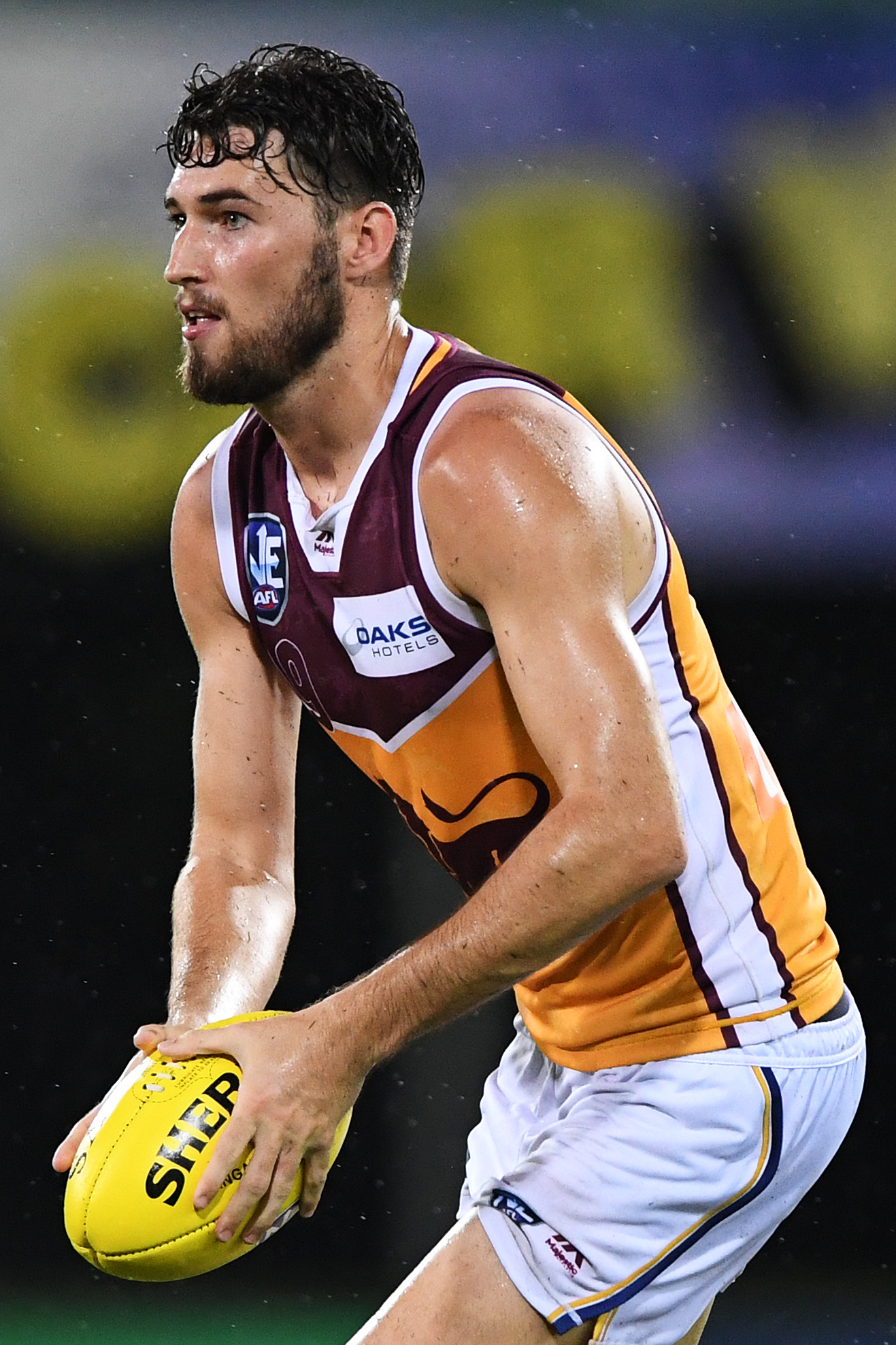
- Allison in April 2019

Personal information
- Full name: Jacob Allison
- Born: 16 April 1998 (age 28)
- Original team: Aspley (NEAFL)
- Draft: No. 55, 2016 national draft (academy bidding selection)
- Debut: Round 19, 2017, Brisbane Lions vs. West Coast, at Subiaco Oval
- Height: 193 cm (6 ft 4 in)
- Weight: 82 kg (181 lb)
- Position: Midfield

Club information
- Current club: Brisbane Lions
- Number: 19

Playing career^{1}
Years	Club	Games (Goals)
2017–2020	Brisbane Lions	10 (2)
- ^{1} Playing statistics correct to the end of 2018.

Jacob Allison (born 16 April 1998) is a former professional Australian rules footballer who played for the Brisbane Lions in the Australian Football League (AFL).

Allison represented Queensland at the 2015 AFL Under 18 Championships and was one of just two Queenslanders named in the Under 18 All-Australian team.

He was drafted by Brisbane with pick 55, as an academy bidding selection, in the 2016 national draft. He made his debut in the loss to West Coast at Subiaco Oval in round 19 of the 2017 season.
