= Bradd Dalziell =

Australian rules footballer (born 1987)

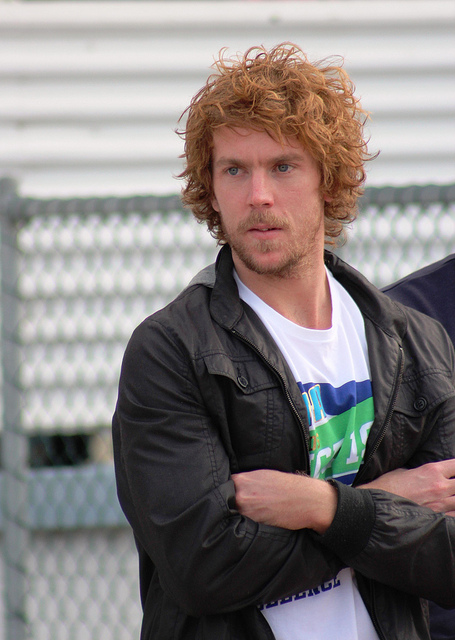
- Dalziell in 2014

Personal information
- Full name: Bradd William Thomas Dalziell
- Nickname: "Razzle Dazzle"
- Born: 15 March 1987 (age 39); Western Australia
- Original team: Lynwood Ferndale JFC
- Draft: 52nd, 2007 National Draft (Brisbane Lions)
- Height: 184 cm (6 ft 0 in)
- Weight: 82 kg (181 lb)
- Position: Midfielder

Club information
- Current club: East Fremantle Football Club

Playing career^{1}
Years	Club	Games (Goals)
2008–2009	Brisbane Lions	15 (4)
2010–2013	West Coast	28 (19)
Total		43 (23)
- ^{1} Playing statistics correct to the end of 2013.

Career highlights
- 2008 AFL Rising Star nominee

Bradd William Thomas Dalziell (born 15 March 1987) is a former Australian rules footballer for the West Coast Eagles in the Australian Football League (AFL). He was drafted to the Brisbane Lions with selection 52 of 2007 AFL National Draft from the East Fremantle Football Club in the West Australian Football League.

== WAFL ==
Bradd Dalziell struggled during the 2007 WAFL season as he broke his arm and missed half of the season, but despite his injury he received earlier on the season, he still managed to win Best and Fairest for the East Fremantle reserves team grand final. Bradd Dalziell also made 3 appearances for the East Fremantle senior team. Despite the lack of senior performances, but Brisbane Lions' WA recruiting assistant Graeme Hadley spotted his talent as a mature age recruit.

Following his de-listing from West Coast at the end of the 2013 season, Bradd returned to East Fremantle.

== AFL ==
=== Brisbane Lions ===
During the preseason training, Bradd Dalziell broke Brisbane Lion's beep test record, which was previously held by Simon Black. During start of the season, he spent time with Suncoast Lions and helped them perform well against many AFLQ opponents. Brad Dalziell was called up to replace Troy Selwood who was omitted from the senior team due to his poor performance against Essendon Bombers. He debuted against West Coast Eagles and made huge impact as he was credited with 32 disposals, breaking the AFL record (since 1992) for most disposals made on debut (Fremantle's Paul Hasleby's 30 in 2000 the previous highest). Brisbane coach, Leigh Matthews praised Dalziell as his performance was "beyond wildest dream" and was surprised by his ability to adapt quickly to the game.

In Round 18 against North Melbourne Kangaroos at Gold Coast Stadium, Bradd Dalziell again has shown his potential as an AFL star as he had career high 34 possessions.

In round 20 against Western Bulldogs, Bradd Dalziell scored his first goal from tight boundary and also he had 27 possessions.

In the Round 21 loss to Carlton at the Gabba, Dalziell had 32 disposals and picked up the Rising Star nomination.

Bradd Dalziell was in the Velocity Sports Cup (AFLQ) Team of the Year for his good performance in AFLQ season and AFL matches with Brisbane Lions, which was announced at the AFLQ Awards Night at the Royal on the Park Hotel. He was named on a half-forward flank with fellow Lions players, Albert Proud (ruck-rover) and Scott Clouston (interchange).

=== West Coast Eagles ===
Dalziell was traded to the West Coast Eagles for Brent Staker and West Coast's third round draft pick (#39 overall) at the end of the 2009 season. The deal also saw Sydney's Amon Buchanan move to the Brisbane Lions and Eagle Mark Seaby move to the Swans. Brad Dalziell was delisted at the end of the 2013 AFL season and he returned to his original WAFL team, East Fremantle.

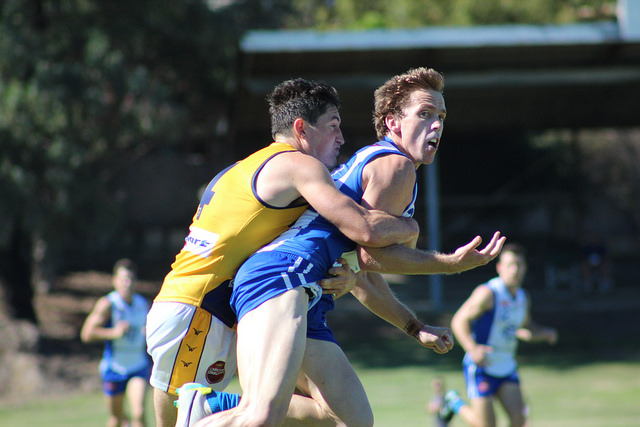
Bradd Dalziell playing for East Fremantle, 12 April 2014
