= Brent Green =

Australian rules footballer

Personal information
- Full name: Brent Green
- Born: 29 March 1976; Southport, Queensland
- Died: 30 November 2009 (aged 33); Gold Coast, Queensland
- Original team: Southport
- Height: 197 cm (6 ft 6 in)
- Weight: 94 kg (207 lb)

Playing career^{1}
Years	Club	Games (Goals)
1995–1996	Brisbane Bears	3 (0)
1997	Brisbane Lions	2 (0)
1998	Sydney	7 (8)
Total		12 (8)
- ^{1} Playing statistics correct to the end of 1998.

Brent Green (29 March 1976 – 30 November 2009) was an Australian rules footballer who played for the Brisbane Bears, Brisbane Lions and Sydney Swans in the Australian Football League (AFL).

== History ==
Green was recruited to the Brisbane Bears from Southport in 1991, and made his senior debut in 1995 playing for them over two seasons, kicking no goals. In 1997, the Bears merged with the Fitzroy Lions to form the Brisbane Lions and Green was a member of the inaugural Lions squad, although he transferred to the Sydney Swans for the 1998 season after playing two games for the Lions. Green played seven games for the Swans, scoring eight goals, but recurring injuries forced him to retire from football at the end of the 1998 season.

Green died on 30 November 2009, drowning while surfing at Narrow Neck on the Gold Coast.
