= James Hawksley =

Australian rules footballer

Personal information
- Full name: James Hawksley
- Born: 5 February 1989 (age 37); New South Wales, Australia
- Original team: Peel Thunder (WAFL)
- Draft: No. 38, 2006 National Draft, Brisbane Lions
- Height: 187 cm (6 ft 2 in)
- Weight: 80 kg (176 lb)
- Position: Midfielder

Playing career^{1}
Years	Club	Games (Goals)
2008–2012	Brisbane Lions	32 (6)
- ^{1} Playing statistics correct to the end of 2012.

Career highlights
- NEAFL premiership player: 2012

James Hawksley (born 5 February 1989) is an Australian rules footballer who played for the Brisbane Lions in Australian Football League (AFL).

Hawksley played most of his junior football with Safety Bay Junior Football Club before moving to Mandurah Centrals JFC. He later played with Peel Thunder in the West Australian Football League (WAFL).

== Brisbane Lions ==
Hawksley was drafted to the Brisbane Lions with the 38th selection in the 2006 AFL draft.

He made his debut against Fremantle in June 2008, round 11. He had 6 disposals (3 handball and kicks) and 2 marks. However, he was dropped next match and returned to Suncoast Lions. Despite his drop from the first team, he continued to impress in AFLQ and was named many times for emergencies for the first team. He eventually won his way back into the senior team following strong form in the QAFL and played in Rounds 19 and 20 of the 2008 season against Hawthorn and the Western Bulldogs where he collected 14 and 17 possessions respectively.

In 2009, he played in every NAB Cup match before struggling to edge his way in to the senior side. Finally in round 18 he made his return to the senior side against Collingwood and kept his spot until the end of the home and away season. In the finals series he was a strong contributor with 9 possessions against the Blues and then saved his best game for 2009 for the match against the Bulldogs where he amassed 15 possessions and made 5 tackles. In 2010 he played a further 11 games, but also spent some time out of the senior team. He re-signed with the Lions in September 2010, but was delisted at the end of the 2012 AFL season. He has since returned to Western Australia and is playing for Peel Thunder.
