= Matt Austin (footballer) =

Australian rules footballer

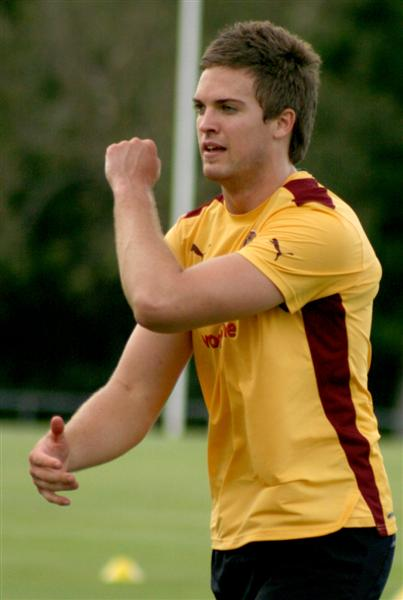

Personal information
- Full name: Matt Austin
- Born: 30 March 1989 (age 37)
- Original team: North Ballarat Rebels (TAC Cup)
- Draft: No. 56, 2007 National Draft, Brisbane Lions
- Height: 186 cm (6 ft 1 in)
- Weight: 80 kg (176 lb)
- Position: Midfielder / Forward

Playing career^{1}
Years	Club	Games (Goals)
2009–2011	Brisbane Lions	15 (2)
- ^{1} Playing statistics correct to the end of 2011.

Matt Austin (born 30 March 1989) is a former Australian rules footballer who played for the Brisbane Lions in the Australian Football League (AFL). He played as a midfielder or half forward.

Austin was recruited from North Ballarat Rebels in the TAC Cup with the 56th selection in the 2007 AFL draft. He made his AFL debut was in round 9 of the 2009 season against the Adelaide Football Club. Austin then played the next two matches, before being dropped. He was recalled for the round 15 match against Geelong before missing the next few games with a back injury. Austin swapped his previous number 37 guernsey for number 8, vacated by the retired Tim Notting. After the 2010 AFL Season, Austin met BBC Celebrity Chef Ainsley Harriot overseas and developed a great friendship. Austin began learning kitchen craft and skills from Ainsley and was offered a TV spot on the UK version of Ready Steady Cook which he declined due to his AFL commitments. The pair still remain in contact to this day. He now plays for Northern Ballarat Roosters(North Melbourne Aligned VFL Team.
