= Tom Collier (footballer) =

Australian rules footballer (born 1989)

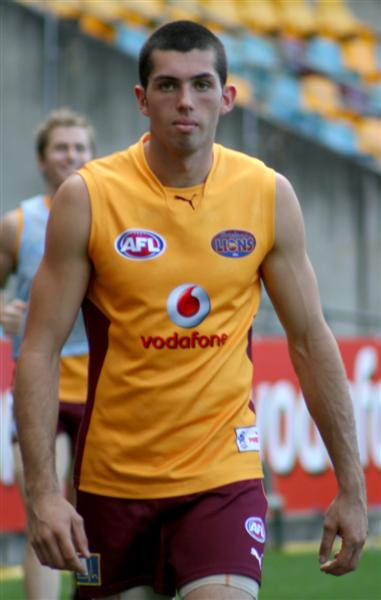
- Collier in 2008

Personal information
- Full name: Tom Collier
- Born: 25 March 1989 (age 37)
- Original team: Tassie Mariners (TAC Cup)
- Draft: No. 25, 2007 National draft, Brisbane Lions
- Height: 192 cm (6 ft 4 in)
- Weight: 86 kg (190 lb)
- Position: Defender

Playing career^{1}
Years	Club	Games (Goals)
2008–2011	Brisbane Lions	27 (4)
- ^{1} Playing statistics correct to the end of 2011.

Tom Collier (born 25 March 1989) is an Australian rules footballer for the Brisbane Lions in the Australian Football League (AFL).

== Career ==
In 2006, Tom Collier graduated from the AIS/AFL Academy. The next year he returned to his home state of Tasmania to play for the Tassie Mariners. That same year he played for the Tasmanian Under-18 side as captain and was named in the All-Australian Under-18 team. Collier was drafted by Brisbane with the 25th selection in the 2007 AFL draft.

In his first season with the Lions, he made his debut in round 13, 2008 at the Gabba against the Adelaide Crows. He had a good debut helping the Lions with their 13-point win. He contributed 17 disposals, three tackles and, three marks. Collier played five more games that season the most significant being the round 15 clash against the Essendon Bombers where he kicked his first goal.

His career continued into 2009 with six more games. Collier had his best match in Brisbane's 43 point upset against Geelong at the Gabba. He equaled his career high of 17 disposals, took three marks and made three tackles.
