= Justin Sherman =

Australian rules footballer (born 1987)

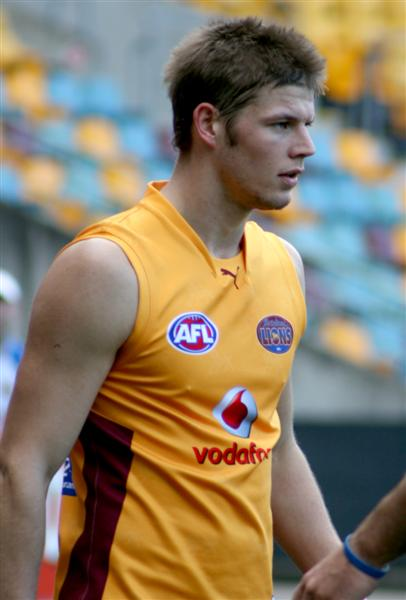

Personal information
- Full name: Justin Sherman
- Born: 26 January 1987 (age 39)
- Original team: Clarence (TFL)
- Draft: No. 45, 2004 national draft
- Height: 183 cm (6 ft 0 in)
- Weight: 87 kg (192 lb)
- Position: Midfielder

Playing career^{1}
Years	Club	Games (Goals)
2005–2010	Brisbane Lions	114 (85)
2011–2012	Western Bulldogs	24 (21)
Total		138 (106)

International team honours
Years	Team	Games (Goals)
2006	Australia	2 (0)
- ^{1} Playing statistics correct to the end of 2012.

Justin Sherman (born 26 January 1987) is an Australian rules footballer who played for the Brisbane Lions and Western Bulldogs in the Australian Football League (AFL).

He was recruited as the number 45 draft pick in the 2004 AFL draft from Clarence. He made his debut for the Brisbane Lions in round 4, 2005 against Hawthorn.

In only his second season of AFL football, Sherman was voted runner-up in the Brisbane Lions best and fairest award.

Sherman played primarily as a midfielder, but could also play in the forward pocket and short deep half-forward and half backline. In October 2010, he was traded to the Western Bulldogs.

In June 2011, he was involved in a racial vilification incident during a match against Gold Coast. A Western Bulldogs media release said he had apologised to the other player and that his apology has been accepted. The club suspended him for four weeks and contributed $5,000 to a charity, take part in the club's multicultural and community programs and volunteer for the Red Dust Role Models program which provided mentoring and support in remote indigenous communities.

As of 2018, Sherman is Captain / Coach of Laurimar Football Club in the Northern Football Netball League.
