= Scott Clouston =

Australian rules footballer

Personal information
- Full name: Scott Clouston
- Born: 2 February 1987 (age 39)
- Original team: Morningside
- Height: 193 cm (6 ft 4 in)
- Weight: 91 kg (201 lb)

Playing career^{1}
Years	Club	Games (Goals)
2008	Brisbane Lions	2 (1)
- ^{1} Playing statistics correct to the end of 2008.

Scott Clouston (born 2 February 1987) is an Australian rules footballer who played with the Brisbane Lions in the Australian Football League (AFL).

Clouston was recruited from Morningside but also played for the University of Queensland. Taken in the 2006 rookie draft, he was elevated to the seniors late in the 2008 AFL season, replacing the retired Beau McDonald on the Brisbane list. The 21-year-old key position player made his league debut in round 18, against North Melbourne at Carrara but was dropped after managing just three disposals. He returned in round 22 and played a solid game against the Sydney Swans at the SCG, taking 11 marks.

Despite spending the 2009 season in Brisbane's senior list, Clouston was not able to break into the team. He began playing with the Redland Australian Football Club after being delisted.

Clouston played with Werribee in the VFL in 2013 before transferring to Williamstown for the 2014 and 2015 seasons. He played 35 games and kicked 46 goals for the Seagulls, including the 2015 premiership victory over Box Hill at Docklands Stadium. Clouston was Club leading goalkicker in 2014 with a total of 31. He retired from the VFL in 2016 and crossed to Avondale Heights.
