= Daniel Dzufer =

Australian rules footballer

Personal information
- Full name: Daniel Dzufer
- Born: 21 January 1988 (age 38)
- Original team: Caloundra
- Height: 188 cm (6 ft 2 in)
- Weight: 83 kg (183 lb)

Playing career^{1}
Years	Club	Games (Goals)
2007–2009	Brisbane Lions	1 (0)
- ^{1} Playing statistics correct to the end of 2009.

Daniel Dzufer (born 21 January 1988) is an Australian rules footballer who played for the Brisbane Lions in the Australian Football League (AFL).

Dzufer was drafted as a rookie with the 35th selection in the 2007 AFL Rookie Draft. He made his debut against Port Adelaide on 30 June 2007 and collected seven handballs, three kicks and three marks. It was to be his only AFL game.

Dzufer's former clubs include AFLQ state league sides Zillmere Eagles, the Suncoast Lions (Brisbane Reserve Team) and the Aspley Australian Football Club.

In March 2008 Dzufer was found guilty of drink-driving and was fined and lost his license for nine months.

He was delisted by the Lions at the end of the 2009 season.
