= Josh Drummond =

Australian rules footballer

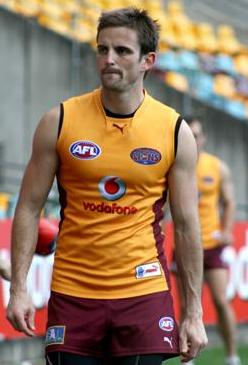
- Drummond with Brisbane in 2008

Personal information
- Full name: Josh Drummond
- Born: 19 April 1983 (age 43); Sunshine Coast, Queensland
- Original team: Maroochydore / Zillmere Eagles
- Draft: No. 60, 2004 Rookie Draft
- Height: 189 cm (6 ft 2 in)
- Position: Defender

Playing career^{1}
Years	Club	Games (Goals)
2005–2012	Brisbane Lions	94 (35)

Coaching career
Years	Club	Games (W–L–D)
2023	Gold Coast VFL	21 (19–2–0)
- ^{1} Playing statistics correct to the end of 2012.

Career highlights
- VFL premiership coach: 2023

Josh Drummond (born 19 April 1983) is a former Australian rules footballer in the Australian Football League who is currently serving as the defensive coach of the Gold Coast Suns. He was a rebounding defender and occasional wingman, with a long and accurate left-foot kick.

== Early life and junior football ==
Dummond was born and raised on the Sunshine Coast in Queensland. His family had moved there from Avoca, Victoria. His school Matthew Flinders Anglican College had a team which he played with, he then joined the local Maroochydore Football Club.

To increase his chances of being drafted to the AFL, he moved to Brisbane to play with the Northern Eagles and nominated for the AFL draft, however was overlooked for three successive years at the club where he played mainly at centre half back despite representing Queensland at the 2003 AFL National Championships and kicking 6 goals against Tasmania. He won the Eagles Best & Fairest in 2003. He was recruited by the Brisbane Lions through the 2003 rookie draft.

== AFL career ==
He was elevated to the Brisbane Lions senior list in Round 8, 2005 when he made his debut against Adelaide. After missing the early part of 2007 through injury, he became one of the Lions' most important players in 2007, with an impressive ability to hit targets from the kick out.

Josh Drummond's left foot kicks were recognised among the most penetrating and damaging in the AFL. Repeated soft tissue injuries, particularly to his quadriceps, hampered Drummond's career. He also missed a significant amount of football after rupturing his anterior cruciate ligament during the 2010 season necessitating LARS surgery. Ongoing struggle with injury forced Drummond into an early retirement at the end of the 2012 season.

== Coaching career ==
Upon retirement from his playing career, Drummond accepted a role as a development coach with North Melbourne in 2013. He remained at North for six seasons and transitioned into assistant coaching roles with the defensive and midfield groups before returning to his home state of Queensland and accepting an assistant coaching role with the Gold Coast Suns in 2018. He became Gold Coast's VFL premiership coach in 2023.
