= Matthew Moody =

Australian rules footballer

Personal information
- Born: 23 September 1985 (age 41)
- Original team: South Fremantle (WAFL)
- Debut: Round 6, 30 April 2005, Brisbane Lions vs. Essendon, at Telstra Dome
- Height: 187 cm (6 ft 2 in)
- Weight: 85 kg (187 lb)

Playing career^{1}
Years	Club	Games (Goals)
2005–2008	Brisbane Lions	34 (14)
- ^{1} Playing statistics correct to the end of 2008.

Matthew Moody (born 23 September 1985) is an Australian rules footballer in the Australian Football League.

He was recruited as the number 23 draft pick in the 2003 AFL draft from South Fremantle in the West Australian Football League. He made his debut for the Brisbane Lions in Round 6, 2005 against Essendon.

Moody struggled with leg injuries in 2007 and 2008, and was eventually delisted by the Lions at the conclusion of the 2008 season. However he was later cleared to train with Fremantle in preparation for potential drafting by another club for 2009. However he was overlooked by all AFL clubs and signed to play with Perth in the West Australian Football League (WAFL).
