= Beau McDonald =

Australian rules footballer

Personal information
- Full name: Beau McDonald
- Born: 3 November 1979 (age 47)
- Original team: Swan Districts (WAFL)
- Draft: 73rd overall, 1997; Brisbane Lions
- Height: 203 cm (6 ft 8 in)
- Weight: 103 kg (227 lb)
- Position: Ruckman

Playing career^{1}
Years	Club	Games (Goals)
1998–2007	Brisbane Lions	91 (19)
- ^{1} Playing statistics correct to the end of 2007.

Career highlights
- AFL Premiership player: 2001, 2002

Beau McDonald (born 3 November 1979) is a former Australian rules footballer in the Australian Football League.

Originally from West Australian Football League (WAFL) club Swan Districts, McDonald was recruited as the number 73 draft pick in the 1997 AFL draft and made his debut for Brisbane in Round 4, 1998 against North Melbourne.

A ruckman, McDonald played 91 games for Brisbane, including the 2001 and 2002 AFL Grand Final victories before a string of injuries, such as a dislocated shoulder in the 2002 Grand Final and an ACL knee injury the following year would limit his output to 27 games over 5 seasons.

In February 2008, McDonald announced his retirement, citing the fact that his body could no longer withstand the rigours of AFL football.

On 28 October 2008, Beau McDonald replaced Clark Keating as Brisbane ruck coach.

== Statistics ==
Legend
G	Goals	K	Kicks	D	Disposals	T	Tackles
B	Behinds	H	Handballs	M	Marks

Season	Team	No.	Games	Totals							Averages (per game)						
Season	Team	No.	Games	G	B	K	H	D	M	T	G	B	K	H	D	M	T
1998	Brisbane Lions	43	3	1	1	14	7	21	4	1	0.3	0.3	4.7	2.3	7.0	1.3	0.3
1999	Brisbane Lions	43	3	0	0	4	2	6	2	1	0.0	0.0	1.3	0.7	2.0	0.7	0.3
2000	Brisbane Lions	43	22	7	11	111	64	175	71	32	0.3	0.5	5.0	2.9	8.0	3.2	1.5
2001†	Brisbane Lions	43	23	7	2	73	65	138	31	34	0.3	0.1	3.2	2.8	6.0	1.3	1.5
2002†	Brisbane Lions	43	15	2	4	40	50	90	30	21	0.1	0.3	2.7	3.3	6.0	2.0	1.4
2003	Brisbane Lions	43	9	1	1	27	21	48	17	8	0.1	0.1	3.0	2.3	5.3	1.9	0.9
2004	Brisbane Lions	43	0	—	—	—	—	—	—	—	—	—	—	—	—	—	—
2005	Brisbane Lions	43	0	—	—	—	—	—	—	—	—	—	—	—	—	—	—
2006	Brisbane Lions	43	8	1	2	23	25	48	16	10	0.1	0.3	2.9	3.1	6.0	2.0	1.3
2007	Brisbane Lions	43	8	0	1	19	23	42	12	10	0.0	0.1	2.4	2.9	5.3	1.5	1.3
Career			91	19	22	311	257	568	183	117	0.2	0.2	3.4	2.8	6.2	2.0	1.3
