= Anthony Corrie =

Australian rules footballer, born 1984

Personal information
- Full name: Anthony Corrie
- Born: 22 June 1984 (age 42); Darwin, Northern Territory
- Original team: Nightcliff
- Draft: 44th overall, 2002 AFL draft 4th overall, 2007 Rookie Draft
- Height: 186 cm (6 ft 1 in)
- Weight: 80 kg (176 lb)
- Position: Midfielder

Playing career^{1}
Years	Club	Games (Goals)
2004–2008	Brisbane Lions	53 (48)
2009–2010	Collingwood	3 (2)
Total		56 (50)
- ^{1} Playing statistics correct to the end of 2010.

Career highlights
- All-Australian U18 2002; Harrison Medal 2002; NAB AFL Rising Star nominee 2005

Anthony Corrie (born 22 June 1984 in Darwin, Australia) is a former professional Australian rules footballer who had a 56-game Australian Football League (AFL) career.

Regarded as one of the most talented under 18s in the country, he was named All-Australian and won the Harrison Medal at the Under 18 National Championships 2002, attracting the attention of AFL talent scouts. The Brisbane Lions recruited him in the 2002 AFL draft from the Southern Districts Football Club. In 2004 he made his AFL debut with the Brisbane Lions against West Coast. Of indigenous heritage, he began playing junior football with the Nightcliff Football Club in the Northern Territory and represented the Northern Territory Thunder side.

Corrie suffered a setback when he broke his jaw in round 12 in a collision with Essendon Football Club's Dustin Fletcher. A finger injury once again proved to be a setback to his career. In 2006, after a couple of in-form games, Corrie ruptured his anterior cruciate ligament on a fall against Fremantle, ending his season.

He was delisted at the end of 2006, but was redrafted by the Lions with their first selection in the 2006 Rookie Draft.

At the end of the 2008 season, Corrie was traded to Collingwood in return for pick 93. He played 3 games for Collingwood in the next 2 seasons before being delisted at the end of the 2010 AFL season.

Since 2014 Corrie has been the playing coach of the Kenmore Australian Football Club in the QFA South league.

First cousin of Melbourne FC's Aaron Davey and Essendon FC's Alwyn Davey through their mothers who are sisters.
