= 2010 Brisbane Lions season =

Coordinates: 27°29′9″S 153°2′17″E

Brisbane Lions
2010 season
- President: Tony Kelly
- Coach: Michael Voss
- Captain: Jonathan Brown
- Home ground: The Gabba
- Pre-season competition: First round
- AFL season: 13th
- Finals series: Did not qualify
- Best and Fairest: Michael Rischitelli
- Leading goalkicker: Jonathan Brown (53)
- Highest home attendance: 36,780 vs. Carlton (1 April 2010)
- Lowest home attendance: 24,789 vs. Sydney (28 August 2010)
- Average home attendance: 29,908

This covers all the results and statistics for the Brisbane Lions in the 2010 AFL season. The team is based in Brisbane, Queensland, Australia.

== 2009 off-season ==
The Lions lost in their semi-final clash against the Western Bulldogs at the Melbourne Cricket Ground by 51 points. It was the last game for veteran Tim Notting, who announced his retirement almost a week from the match. Michael Voss was desperate to make some changes to the playing list. The Lions secured three players on the first day of the 2009 AFL Trade Week. Sydney's Amon Buchanan and West Coast's Brent Staker were traded in a complex three-team deal that also involved Brisbane's Bradd Dalziell who went to West Coast and West Coast's Mark Seaby who went to Sydney. In a separate trade on the same day, Richmond's Andrew Raines joined the Lions. The Lions continued to be active in the trade week and on the fourth day they secured St Kilda's Xavier Clarke. On the final day of Trade Week, Fevola was traded to the Lions for Lachlan Henderson. Daniel Bradshaw and Michael Rischitelli originally were put up trade for Fevola but the deal fell through after Rischitelli declined. Bradshaw was incensed at being put up for trade and eventually quit the Lions.

With one of the best team rosters ahead of the 2010 season, Brisbane were expected to once again make the finals. Four straight wins saw them on top of the ladder after round four, but from there the Lions went into freefall winning only three more games for the season.

== Squad for 2010 ==
Statistics are correct as of start of 2010 season.

Senior List
No.	Player	Hgt	Wgt	Date of birth	Age in 2010	Debut	Recruited from	Games	Goals
1	(Western Australia) Mitch Clark	198	95	19 October 1987	23	2006	East Fremantle	46	25
2	(Queensland) Albert Proud	180	83	6 September 1988	22	2007	Mount Gravatt	22	4
3	(Victoria (state)) Sam Sheldon	183	80	8 March 1989	23	2009	Hailebury College / Oakleigh U18	19	1
4	(Victoria (state)) Travis Johnstone	184	83	17 July 1980	30	1998	Chelsea / Dandenong U18 / Melbourne	194	134
5	(Victoria (state)) Brendan Fevola	191	100	20 January 1981	29	1999	Beaconsfield / Dandenong Stingrays / Carlton	187	575
6	(Victoria (state)) Luke Power	179	78	8 January 1980	30	1998	Balwyn / Oakleigh U18	241	198
7	(Victoria (state)) Jed Adcock	184	85	15 November 1985	25	2004	Maryborough / North Ballarat U18	91	27
8	(Victoria (state)) Matt Austin	187	75	30 March 1989	21	2009	North Ballarat U18	8	2
9	(Western Australia) Ashley McGrath	182	81	20 May 1983	27	2001	South Fremantle	137	106
10	(Western Australia) Daniel Rich	184	83	7 June 1990	20	2009	Subiaco	24	14
11	(Tasmania) Justin Sherman	184	87	26 January 1987	23	2005	Clarence / Tasmania U18	97	73
12	(Western Australia) James Hawksley	187	77	5 February 1989	21	2008	Peel Thunder	11	0
13	(Victoria (state)) Callum Bartlett	179	75	19 June 1991	19	****	Geelong U18	0	0
14	(New South Wales) Brent Staker	182	78	23 May 1984	25	2003	NSW/ACT Rams / West Coast	110	84
15	(Northern Territory) Xavier Clarke	182	78	28 September 1983	27	2002	St Mary's / St Kilda	105	49
16	(Victoria (state)) Jonathan Brown	195	102	29 October 1981	27	2000	Geelong U18	184	423
17	(Northern Territory) Jared Brennan	192	95	28 July 1984	26	2003	Southern Districts	101	66
18	(Western Australia) Todd Banfield	182	75	28 June 1990	20	****	Swan Districts	0	0
19	(Queensland) Jamie Charman	197	102	16 July 1982	28	2001	Northern Eagles	129	55
20	(Western Australia) Simon Black	186	83	3 April 1979	31	1998	East Fremantle	256	153
21	(Queensland) Daniel Merrett	196	104	12 December 1984	26	2005	Southport	87	17
22	(Tasmania) Tom Collier	192	84	25 March 1989	21	2008	Tasmanian Devils	12	1
23	(Western Australia) Matthew Leuenberger	203	98	7 June 1988	21	2007	East Perth	22	3
24	(South Australia) Joel Patfull	190	89	7 December 1984	26	2006	Norwood / Port Adelaide	78	19
25	(Tasmania) Bart McCulloch	199	86	23 September 1990	20	****	South Launceston	0	0
26	(Tasmania) Ryan Harwood	183	81	8 July 1991	19	****	Tasmania U18	0	0
28	(Victoria (state)) Troy Selwood	187	85	1 May 1984	26	2005	Bendigo U18	70	11
29	(Queensland) Andrew Raines	192	86	8 March 1986	24	2004	Southport / Richmond	56	1
30	(South Australia) Jack Redden	189	74	9 December 1990	20	2009	Glenelg	10	6
31	(Victoria (state)) James Polkinghorne	183	81	21 January 1989	21	2008	Calder U18	24	15
32	(Queensland) Cheynee Stiller	186	82	3 May 1986	24	2006	Northern Eagles	67	17
33	(Victoria (state)) Amon Buchanan	179	83	10 October 1982	28	2002	Geelong Falcons / Sydney	116	57
34	(South Australia) Jesse O'Brien	184	71	13 February 1991	19	****	North Adelaide	0	0
35	(Victoria (state)) Michael Rischitelli	184	82	8 January 1986	24	2005	Western U18	89	40
36	(Victoria (state)) Matt Maguire	190	94	30 May 1984	26	2002	Geelong U18 / St Kilda	99	19
37	(Queensland) Bryce Retzlaff	192	82	29 June 1991	19	****	Labrador	0	0
38	(Victoria (state)) Tom Rockliff	184	83	22 February 1990	20	2009	Murray Bushrangers U18	1	0
39	(Queensland) Josh Drummond	188	87	19 April 1983	27	2005	Northern Eagles	65	26
42	(Republic of Ireland) Pearce Hanley	184	83	15 November 1988	22	2008	County Mayo	3	0
44	(Tasmania) Aaron Cornelius	192	86	25 May 1990	20	2009	Tassie Mariners U18	1	2
Rookie List
No.	Player	Hgt	Wgt	Date of birth	Age in 2010	Debut	Recruited from	Games	Goals
27	(Victoria (state)) Josh Dyson	181	69	12 August 1991	19	****	Eastern Ranges U18	0	0
40	(Republic of Ireland) Niall McKeever	198	95	16 February 1989	21	****	County Antrim	0	0
41	(Victoria (state)) Mitchell Golby	183	82	3 October 1991	19	****	Gippsland Power	0	0
43	(Victoria (state)) Claye Beams	182	77	1 September 1991	19	****	Labrador	0	0
45	(Japan) Sean Yoshiura	185	73	6 August 1991	19	****	Mount Gravatt	0	0
46	(Queensland) Broc McCauley	200	101	20 December 1986	24	****	Southport	0	0

== Player changes for 2010 ==
=== In ===
Player	Previous club	League	via
(Queensland) Andrew Raines	Richmond	AFL	2009 AFL Trade Week
(New South Wales) Brent Staker	West Coast	AFL	2009 AFL Trade Week
(Victoria (state)) Amon Buchanan	Sydney	AFL	2009 AFL Trade Week
(Northern Territory) Xavier Clarke	St Kilda	AFL	2009 AFL Trade Week
(Victoria (state)) Brendan Fevola	Carlton	AFL	2009 AFL Trade Week
(Victoria (state)) Matt Maguire	St Kilda	AFL	2009 AFL draft – Pick #91
(Victoria (state)) Callum Bartlett	Geelong Falcons	TAC Cup	2009 AFL draft – Pick #27
(Tasmania) Ryan Harwood	Glenorchy	TFL	2009 AFL draft – Pick #47
(South Australia) Jesse O'Brien	North Adelaide	SANFL	2009 AFL draft – Pick #73
(Queensland) Bryce Retzlaff	Labrador Tigers	QAFL	2009 AFL draft – Pick #84
(Victoria (state)) Mitchell Golby	Gippsland Power	TAC Cup	2010 Rookie Draft – Pick #16
(Victoria (state)) Josh Dyson	Eastern Rangers	TAC Cup	2010 Rookie Draft – Pick #32
(Republic of Ireland) Niall McKeever	Antrim GAA	All-Ireland	2010 Rookie Draft – Pick #67
(Japan) Sean Yoshuira	Mount Gravatt	QAFL	2010 Rookie Draft – Pick #74
(Queensland) Claye Beams	Labrador Tigers	QAFL	2010 Rookie Draft – Pick #76
(Queensland) Broc McCauley	Southport Sharks	QAFL	2010 Rookie Draft – Pick #78

=== Out ===
Player	New Club	League	via
(Victoria (state)) Tim Notting	Labrador Tigers	QAFL	Retired
(Western Australia) Bradd Dalziell	West Coast	AFL	2009 AFL Trade Week
(Victoria (state)) Lachlan Henderson	Carlton	AFL	2009 AFL Trade Week
(Queensland) Rhan Hooper	Hawthorn	AFL	2009 AFL draft – Pick #58
(Queensland) Joel Macdonald	Melbourne	AFL	2010 Pre-season Draft – Pick #1
(Victoria (state)) Daniel Bradshaw	Sydney	AFL	2010 Pre-season Draft – Pick #4
(Queensland) Scott Harding	Port Adelaide	AFL	2010 Pre-season Draft – Pick #7
(Northern Territory) Jason Roe	East Perth	WAFL	Delisted
(Queensland) Daniel Dzufer	Redland	QAFL	Delisted
(Queensland) Adam Spackman	Brisbane Lions (Note: Administrative role: Football Administration Manager)	AFL	Delisted
(Queensland) Joel Tippett	Gold Coast	VFL	Delisted
(Queensland) Scott Clouston	Redland	QAFL	Delisted
(Victoria (state)) Matt Tyler	Unknown	Unknown	Delisted
(Western Australia) Kieran King	Unknown	Unknown	Delisted
(Queensland) Pat Garner	Unknown	Unknown	Delisted
(Western Australia) Daniel Murray	Unknown	Unknown	Delisted

== Ladder ==
2010 AFL ladder
Pos	Team	Pld	W	L	D	PF	PA	PP	Pts	
1	Collingwood (P)	22	17	4	1	2349	1658	141.7	70	Finals series
2	Geelong	22	17	5	0	2518	1702	147.9	68	Finals series
3	St Kilda	22	15	6	1	1935	1591	121.6	62	Finals series
4	Western Bulldogs	22	14	8	0	2174	1734	125.4	56	Finals series
5	Sydney	22	13	9	0	2017	1863	108.3	52	Finals series
6	Fremantle	22	13	9	0	2168	2087	103.9	52	Finals series
7	Hawthorn	22	12	9	1	2044	1847	110.7	50	Finals series
8	Carlton	22	11	11	0	2143	1983	108.1	44	Finals series
9	North Melbourne	22	11	11	0	1930	2208	87.4	44	
10	Port Adelaide	22	10	12	0	1749	2123	82.4	40	
11	Adelaide	22	9	13	0	1763	1870	94.3	36	
12	Melbourne	22	8	13	1	1863	1971	94.5	34	
13	Brisbane Lions	22	7	15	0	1775	2158	82.3	28	
14	Essendon	22	7	15	0	1930	2402	80.3	28	
15	Richmond	22	6	16	0	1714	2348	73.0	24	
16	West Coast	22	4	18	0	1773	2300	77.1	16	

Source: AFL ladder
Rules for classification: 1) points; 2) percentage; 3) number of points for.
(P) Premiers

== Results ==
=== NAB Cup ===
==== First Round ====
First Round
14 February 4:40 pm	Western Bulldogs	def.	Brisbane Lions	Manuka Oval (crowd: 3,707)	Report
0.0.4 (4); 0.1.8 (14); 0.4.14 (38); 1.5.14 (53)	Q1; Q2; Q3; Final	1.1.3 (18); 1.3.6 (33); 1.3.6 (33); 1.5.6 (45)	Television broadcast: Fox Sports
Griffen	Super Goals	Sherman
Everitt 2, Cooney, Roughead, Jones	Goals	Sherman 2, Fevola, O'Brien, Brennan
Cooney, Giansiracusa, Gilbee	Best	Buchanan, Sherman, Rischitelli
Nil	Injuries	Nil
Nil	Reports	Nil
The Lions got the first goal through new recruit Brendan Fevola. Justin Sherman kicked a 9-point supergoal from a 50-metre penalty. The Lions added a further 3 behinds to take a 1.1.3 (18) to 0.0.4 (4) lead at quarter-time. The Bulldogs got off to a good start, kicking the first goal of the quarter through Andrejs Everitt. But the Lions kicked two unanswered goals through Jesse O'Brien and Justin Sherman, with the Lions leading 1.3.6 (33) to 0.1.8 (14) at half-time. Adam Cooney reduced the Lions' lead, kicking the first goal of the second half. After the Bulldogs scored four consecutive behinds (including one rushed behind), goals to Jordan Roughead and Liam Jones put the Bulldogs in front. The Lions failed to score in the third quarter. Andrejs Everitt extended the Bulldogs' lead at the start of the final quarter, before Justin Sherman reduced the margin back to 5 points with his second goal. An interchange infringement from Brisbane resulted in a 50-metre penalty and a nine-point supergoal, kicked by Ryan Griffen. Jared Brennan cut the margin back to eight points, but that ended up being the final score. The Bulldogs prevailed 1.5.14 (53) to 1.5.6 (45). The Western Bulldogs went on to play Hawthorn at Etihad Stadium in the Quarter Finals. The Brisbane Lions played Carlton two weeks later in a practice match.

=== NAB Challenge ===
==== Week 2 ====
Week 2
26 February 4:00 pm	Carlton	def.	Brisbane Lions	Visy Park (crowd: 10,000)	Report
3.6 (24); 4.7 (31); 8.8 (56); 14.9 (93)	Q1; Q2; Q3; Final	4.1 (25); 7.2 (44); 10.3 (63); 12.8 (80)
Brisbane lost by 8 points in the First Round to the Western Bulldogs, while Carlton lost to Sydney by 12 points. Brendan Fevola played against his old club for the first time and kicked 2 goals.

==== Week 3 ====
Week 3
6 March 3:00 pm	Geelong	v	Brisbane Lions	Visy Park
Q1; Q2; Q3; Final
The match was cancelled due to severe thunderstorms that hit the Melbourne area.

==== Week 4 ====
Week 4
12 March 3:30 pm	Brisbane Lions	def.	Hawthorn	Fankhauser Reserve (crowd: 4,353)	Report
2.1 (13); 2.6 (18); 4.12 (36); 7.14 (56)	Q1; Q2; Q3; Final	1.1 (7); 3.3 (21); 3.6 (24); 6.9 (45)	Umpires: Donlon, Farmer, McInerney
Staker 3, Brown, Johnstone, Rischitelli, Banfield	Goals	Franklin 2, Hooper, Lewis, Ladson, Brown
Black, Merrett, Staker, Brennan, Adcock, Banfield	Best	Hodge, Mitchell, Guerra, Lewis
Nil	Injuries	Roughead (knee), Moss (ankle).

=== Premiership season ===
==== Round 1 ====
Round 1
27 March 7:10 pm	Brisbane Lions	def.	West Coast	The Gabba (crowd: 29,201)	Report
2.6 (18); 6.10 (46); 9.12 (66); 16.18 (114)	Q1; Q2; Q3; Final	4.2 (26); 7.6 (48); 10.8 (68); 12.10 (82)	Umpires: Hay, Wenn, Jeffery; Television broadcast: Fox Sports
Brown 5, Fevola 3, Power 3, Staker, Sherman, Drummond, Banfield, Brennan	Goals	Kennedy 2, Shuey 2, Lynch 2, Embley, LeCras, Ebert, Cox, Naitanui, McGinnity
Brennan, Black, Brown, Rischitelli, Power, Banfield	Best	Selwood, Priddis, McGinnity, Kennedy, Embley
Buchanan (hand), Adcock (ankle)	Injuries	Nil
Nil	Reports	Nil
For the third year in a row, Brisbane will play West Coast in Round 1.

==== Round 2 ====
Round 2
1 April 7:40 pm	Brisbane Lions	def.	Carlton	The Gabba (crowd: 36,780)	Report
4.3 (27); 8.3 (51); 10.7 (67); 16.11 (107)	Q1; Q2; Q3; Final	2.6 (18); 3.11 (29); 10.14 (74); 12.16 (88)	Umpires: Vozzo, Meredith, S. Ryan; Television broadcast: Seven
Brown 7, Fevola 3, Banfield 2, Staker, Clark, Black, Rischitelli	Goals	Ó hAilpín 4, Henderson 3, Simpson, Murphy, Robinson, McLean, Gibbs
Brown, Johnstone, Brennan, Banfield, Power, Drummond	Best	Murphy, Gibbs, Jamison, Scotland, McLean
Adcock (thigh)	Injuries	Bower (replaced in selected side by Armfield)
Brennan (bumping)	Reports	Nil
This match saw Brisbane's Brendan Fevola play against his former club for the first time in a league match since he was traded.

==== Round 3 ====
Round 3
10 April 2:40 pm	Port Adelaide	def. by	Brisbane Lions	AAMI Stadium (crowd: 23,306)	Report
1.4 (10); 3.11 (29); 6.12 (48); 11.15 (81)	Q1; Q2; Q3; Final	5.5 (35); 10.8 (68); 14.9 (93); 16.12 (108)	Umpires: Kennedy, Keating, Nicholls; Television broadcast: Fox Sports
Tredrea 3, Schulz 2, Salopek 2, Pearce, Davenport, Carlile, Boak	Goals	Brown 5, Sherman 4, Fevola 7, Banfield, Staker, Patfull, Rischitelli
Salopek, K. Cornes, Pearce, Schulz	Best	Brown, Sherman, Rischitelli, Staker, Rockliff, Fevola, Maguire
Brogan (shoulder) replaced in side by Cloke, Trengove (cut eye)	Injuries	Rischitelli (cut head), Black (calf)
Nil	Reports	Clark (striking), McGrath (rough conduct)

==== Round 4 ====
Round 4
17 April 7:10 pm	Brisbane Lions	def.	Western Bulldogs	The Gabba (crowd: 33,323)	Report
2.5 (17); 4.11 (35); 10.18 (78); 13.23 (101)	Q1; Q2; Q3; Final	2.4 (16); 9.5 (59); 11.6 (72); 12.7 (79)	Umpires: Stevic, Meredith, Findlay; Television broadcast: Fox Sports
Fevola 4, Banfield 2, Brown 2, Sherman, Brennan, Drummond, Johnstone, Proud	Goals	Hall 4, Giansiracusa 3, Addison 2, Boyd, Hill, Higgins
Brennan, Power, Rischitelli, Proud, Fevola, Drummond, Johnstone	Best	Hudson, Griffen, Higgins, Lake, Hall, Addison, Cross
Maguire (concussion)	Injuries	Williams (neck)
Nil.	Reports	Nil.

==== Round 5 ====
Round 5
24 April 7:10 pm	Melbourne	def.	Brisbane Lions	MCG (crowd: 36,396)	Report
4.2 (26); 9.6 (60); 12.7 (79); 15.13 (103)	Q1; Q2; Q3; Final	2.3 (15); 3.6 (24); 7.9 (51); 7.11 (53)	Umpires: Kennedy, Wenn, Jennings; Television broadcast: Fox Sports
Petterd 2, Davey 2, Trengove 2, Sylvia 2, Green, Jones, Bate, Scully, Jamar, McKenzie, McDonald	Goals	Fevola 4, Brown, Clark, Drummond
Trengove, Jones, Green, Petterd, Davey, Sylvia, Jamar, McDonald	Best	Black, Johnstone, Fevola, Rischitelli, Drummond, Rich
Bail (quad) replaced in selected side by Martin	Injuries	Sherman (corked thigh) replaced in selected side by Proud, Merrett (hamstring)
Nil	Reports	Nil

==== Round 6 ====
Round 6
1 May 7:10 pm	Sydney	def.	Brisbane Lions	SCG (crowd: 30,975)	Report
5.1 (31); 9.5 (59); 16.8 (104); 16.11 (107)	Q1; Q2; Q3; Final	2.2 (14); 5.3 (33); 11.4 (70); 13.9 (87)	Umpires: Vozzo, McBurney, Wenn; Television broadcast: Fox Sports
Bradshaw 6, Goodes 3, J. Bolton 2, Smith 2, Jack, Malceski, Moore	Goals	Fevola 4, Brown 4, Banfield 3, Polkinghorne, Leuenberger
Bradshaw, J. Bolton, Jack, Shaw, O'Keefe, Goodes	Best	Clark, Brown, Banfield, Rischitelli, Drummond, Raines
J. Bolton (concussion), Seaby (ankle), Hannebery (shoulder), O'Keefe (concussion), Richards (ankle)	Injuries	Maguire (concussion)
Bolton (bumping)	Reports	Maguire (rough conduct)

==== Round 7 ====
Round 7
8 May 7:10 pm	Brisbane Lions	def. by	Fremantle	The Gabba (crowd: 27,739)	Report
5.2 (32); 6.4 (40); 10.7 (67); 15.10 (100)	Q1; Q2; Q3; Final	5.5 (35); 9.9 (64); 12.15 (87); 15.23 (113)	Umpires: Nicholls, McInerney, Mollison; Television broadcast: Fox Sports
Fevola 3, Black 2, Banfield 2, Sherman, McGrath, Drummond, Brown, Rockliff, Stiller, Rich, Rischitelli	Goals	Pavlich 3, Johnson 2, Ballantyne 2, Hasleby 2, Morabito, Palmer, Sandilands, Fyfe, Mayne, Barlow
Black, Rischitelli, McGrath, Staker, Power, Sherman	Best	Hill, Mundy, Tarrant, McPharlin, Barlow, Pavlich, Ballantyne
Drummond (knee), Brennan (ankle)	Injuries	Nil
Leuenberger (negligent conduct with an umpire)	Reports	Nil

==== Round 8 ====
Round 8
15 May 7:10 pm	Brisbane Lions	def. by	Geelong	The Gabba (crowd: 33,629)	Report
1.6 (12); 4.8 (32); 8.12 (60); 10.14 (74)	Q1; Q2; Q3; Final	6.2 (38); 11.4 (70); 18.6 (114); 24.11 (155)	Umpires: Kennedy, S. Ryan, Avon; Television broadcast: Ten / One
Brown 3, Sherman 3, Buchanan, Fevola, Power, Rockliff	Goals	Johnson 6, Hawkins 4, Byrnes 3, Mooney 3, Bartel 2, Chapman 2, Ablett, Hogan, Ling, Varcoe
Brown, Black, Sherman, Polkinghorne, Leuenberger	Best	Johnson, Selwood, Ablett, Chapman, Scarlett, Mackie, Ling
Nil	Injuries	Nil
Nil	Reports	Nil
Brisbane suffered its worst ever defeat at the Gabba this round going down to Geelong.

==== Round 9 ====
Round 9
23 May 12:40 pm	Adelaide	def.	Brisbane Lions	AAMI Stadium (crowd: 31,517)	Report
5.3 (33); 6.9 (45); 9.12 (66); 13.15 (93)	Q1; Q2; Q3; Final	2.2 (14); 6.5 (41); 9.11 (65); 11.15 (81)	Umpires: Grun, Nicholls, Meredith; Television broadcast: Fox Sports
Douglas 3, Dangerfield 3, McLeod 2, Walker 2, Porplyzia, Tippett, Gunston	Goals	Fevola 5, Banfield 2, McGrath 2, Rich, Sherman
van Berlo, Douglas, Rutten, Thompson, Reilly, Dangerfield	Best	McGrath, Banfield, Rich, Fevola, Sherman, Leuenberger
Nil	Injuries	Nil
Nil	Reports	Nil

==== Round 10 ====
Round 10
29 May 7:10 pm	Brisbane Lions	def.	Collingwood	The Gabba (crowd: 34,239)	Report
4.4 (28); 6.6 (42); 9.8 (62); 13.10 (88)	Q1; Q2; Q3; Final	6.5 (41); 8.9 (57); 9.11 (65); 11.14 (80)	Umpires: Stevic, Stewart, Pannell; Television broadcast: Ten / One
Brown 4, Fevola 4, Banfield 2, Rich 2, Power	Goals	Didak 2, Sidebottom 2, Dawes 2, Anthony, Pendlebury, Thomas, O'Brien, Jolly
Power, Rich, Black, Brown, Patfull, Johnstone	Best	Thomas, Pendlebury, Didak, Prestigiacomo, Swan, Sidebottom
Nil	Injuries	Nil
Nil	Reports	Nil

==== Round 11 ====
Round 11
5 June 7:10 pm	North Melbourne	def.	Brisbane Lions	Etihad Stadium (crowd: 19,100)	Report
7.5 (47); 10.10 (70); 11.15 (81); 12.18 (90)	Q1; Q2; Q3; Final	2.1 (13); 5.4 (34); 10.8 (68); 13.11 (89)	Umpires: Nicholls, Hay, Wenn; Television broadcast: Fox Sports
Swallow 2, Thomas 2, Hansen 2, Harvey, Lower, McIntosh, Wright, Cunnington, Greenwood	Goals	Fevola 5, Brown 3, Buchanan 2, Brennan, Rich, Clark
Swallow, Harvey, Hansen, Lower, Ziebell, Bastinac	Best	Johnstone, Brown, Power, Fevola, Rischitelli, Rockliff, Sherman
Nil	Injuries	McGrath (hamstring), Maguire
Nil	Reports	Nil

==== Round 12 ====
Round 12
13 June 2:10 pm	Western Bulldogs	def.	Brisbane Lions	Etihad Stadium (crowd: 30,831)	Report
5.6 (36); 7.9 (51); 13.12 (90); 17.19 (121)	Q1; Q2; Q3; Final	1.1 (7); 5.2 (32); 6.4 (40); 8.8 (56)	Umpires: Kamolins, Avon, McInerney; Television broadcast: Seven
Hall 6, Giansiracusa 3, Stack 2, Minson 2, Grant, Gilbee, Hill, Eagleton	Goals	Buchanan 3, Fevola 2, Staker, Redden, Rischitelli
Hall, Boyd, Morris, Griffen, Cooney, Cross	Best	Rischitelli, Black, Buchanan, Rockliff, Rich
Williams (hamstring)	Injuries	Staker (knee)
Nil	Reports	Nil

==== Round 13 ====
Round 13
19 June 7:10 pm	Brisbane Lions	def. by	Richmond	The Gabba (crowd: 28,415)	Report
2.4 (16); 6.5 (41); 8.10 (58); 12.14 (86)	Q1; Q2; Q3; Final	5.2 (32); 9.7 (61); 10.12 (72); 15.15 (105)	Umpires: Vozzo, Farmer, Jennings; Television broadcast: Fox Sports
Cornelius 3, Staker 3, Banfield 2, Fevola, Redden, Rockliff, Sherman	Goals	Collins 3, Riewoldt 3, Edwards 2, White 2, Cousins, Farmer, Griffiths, Martin, Vickery
Banfield, Cornelius, Johnstone, Rockliff, Staker	Best	Deledio, Martin, Cousins, Riewoldt, White, Tuck
Buchanan	Injuries	McGuane (ankle)
Rischitelli (melee), Sheldon (melee)	Reports	King (melee), Riewoldt (melee)
Brendan Fevola played his 200th AFL game.

==== Round 14 ====
Round 14
1 July 7:10 pm	Carlton	def.	Brisbane Lions	Etihad Stadium (crowd: 35,623)	Report
2.4 (16); 8.9 (57); 12.9 (81); 18.12 (120)	Q1; Q2; Q3; Final	4.5 (29); 5.7 (37); 8.8 (56); 9.11 (65)	Umpires: Margetts, Meredith, McInerney; Television broadcast: Ten / One
Betts 5, Garlett 2, Yarran 2, Henderson 2, Scotland 2, Simpson 2, Gibbs, Houlihan, Ó hAilpín	Goals	Banfield 2, Cornelius 2, Black, Buchanan, Polkinghorne, Redden, Rich
Judd, Betts, Simpson, Gibbs, Scotland, Houlihan, Murphy, Carrazzo	Best	Leuenberger, Rischitelli, Black, Rockliff, Johnstone, Redden
Nil	Injuries	Nil
Nil	Reports	Nil

==== Round 15 ====
Round 15
10 July 7:10 pm	Brisbane Lions	def. by	St Kilda	The Gabba (crowd: 29,329)	Report
3.1 (19); 6.1 (37); 7.3 (45); 10.5 (65)	Q1; Q2; Q3; Final	3.1 (19); 3.3 (21); 7.7 (49); 11.13 (79)	Umpires: Sully, Wenn, Findlay; Television broadcast: Ten / One
Fevola 4, Black, Brennan, Buchanan, Cornelius, Polkinghorne, Power	Goals	Milne 2, Schneider 2, Dal Santo, Gwilt, McEvoy, McQualter, Montagna, Peake, Riewoldt
Rich, Redden, Rockliff, Black, Power, Fevola	Best	Montagna, Hayes, Ray, Gwilt, Dal Santo, Gilbert
Nil	Injuries	Nil
Fevola (melee), Redden (melee), Hanley (melee), McGrath (melee), Banfield (melee), Patfull (melee), Buchanan (melee)	Reports	Gilbert (rough conduct), Blake (tripping), Pattison (melee), Riewoldt (melee), Dal Santo (melee), Fisher (melee), McQualter (melee)

==== Round 16 ====
Round 16
17 July 2:10 pm	Hawthorn	def.	Brisbane Lions	Aurora Stadium (crowd: 16,690)	Report
7.3 (45); 9.6 (60); 16.12 (108); 17.16 (118)	Q1; Q2; Q3; Final	1.0 (6); 4.0 (24); 6.0 (36); 7.1 (43)	Umpires: Kennedy, Ryan, Farmer; Television broadcast: Fox Sports
Roughead 4, Lewis 4, Young 3, Skipper, Brown, Ellis, Osborne, Peterson, Rioli	Goals	Brown 3, Buchanan, Fevola, Power, Staker
Hodge, Lewis, Burgoyne, Mitchell, Sewell, Young	Best	Power, Brennan, Leuenberger, Staker, Rischitelli
Nil	Injuries	Nil
Nil	Reports	Nil

==== Round 17 ====
Round 17
24 July 2:10 pm	Geelong	def.	Brisbane Lions	Skilled Stadium (crowd: 24,508)	Report
5.2 (32); 10.4 (64); 16.8 (104); 19.13 (127)	Q1; Q2; Q3; Final	0.3 (3); 4.6 (30); 6.8 (44); 9.10 (64)	Umpires: Kennedy, Stewart, Dalgleish; Television broadcast: Fox Sports
Ablett 5, Johnson 4, Varcoe 4, Podsiadly, Corey, Kelly, Ling, Stokes, Wojcinski	Goals	Brown 4, Banfield, Proud, Cornelius, Fevola, Leuenberger
Selwood, Ablett, Varcoe, Chapman, Kelly, Scarlett	Best	Rockliff, Redden, Power, Leuenberger, Proud, Brown
Nil	Injuries	Buchanan (knee), Clark (concussion)
Nil	Reports	Staker (striking)

==== Round 18 ====
Round 18
31 July 7:10 pm	Brisbane Lions	def. by	Melbourne	The Gabba (crowd: 26,144)	Report
2.2 (14); 4.5 (29); 7.6 (48); 9.10 (64)	Q1; Q2; Q3; Final	4.3 (27); 9.5 (59); 10.8 (68); 11.8 (74)	Umpires: McLaren, Grun, Hay; Television broadcast: Fox Sports
Proud 3, Brown 2, Banfield, Brennan, Harwood, Rischitelli	Goals	Dunn 3, Green 2, Sylvia 2, Wonaeamirri, Morton, Bail, Johnson
Rischitelli, Brennan, Sherman, Rockliff, Merrett, Black	Best	Sylvia, Jamar, Macdonald, Scully, Green, Frawley
Clarke (hamstring), Fevola (groin)	Injuries	Nil
Fevola (misconduct)	Reports	Nil

==== Round 19 ====
Round 19
7 August 5:40 pm	West Coast	def. by	Brisbane Lions	Subiaco Oval (crowd: 32,587)	Report
2.2 (14); 4.5 (29); 8.6 (54); 9.11 (65)	Q1; Q2; Q3; Final	1.3 (9); 7.5 (47); 9.7 (61); 10.10 (70)	Umpires: Margetts, Armstrong, Keating; Television broadcast: Fox Sports
LeCras 2, Embley, Lynch, Priddis, S. Selwood, Sheppard, Stevens, Strijk	Goals	Brown 5, Brennan, Hanley, Banfield, Rockliff, Harwood
S. Selwood, Priddis, Strijk, McGinnity, Cox, Smith	Best	Rischitelli, Brennan, Black, McGrath, Brown, Staker
Waters (illness) replaced in selected side by Stevens	Injuries	Nil
Nil	Reports	Nil
Brisbane won its first game since round 10 and in the process avoided its first wooden spoon in twelve years whilst at the same time condemning the Eagles to their first ever last place finish.

==== Round 20 ====
Round 20
15 August 1:10 pm	Brisbane Lions	def. by	Adelaide	The Gabba (crowd: 25,403)	Report
4.7 (31); 6.12 (48); 12.14 (86); 13.19 (97)	Q1; Q2; Q3; Final	2.4 (16); 9.5 (59); 13.8 (86); 15.14 (104)	Umpires: Farmer, H. Ryan, Jennings; Television broadcast: Fox Sports
Clark 5, Banfield, Patfull, Polkinghorne, Harwood, Hanley, Black, Power, Staker	Goals	Tippett 5, Porplyzia 3, Douglas 2, Henderson 2, Sellar, Davis, van Berlo
Clark, Black, Rockliff, Stiller, McGrath	Best	Tippett, Douglas, Symes, van Berlo, Porplyzia, Johncock
Nil	Injuries	Vince (knee), Knights (hamstring)
Nil	Reports	Nil

==== Round 21 ====
Round 21
22 August 2:10 pm	Essendon	def. by	Brisbane Lions	Etihad Stadium (crowd: 28,785)	Report
2.1 (13); 2.4 (16); 4.6 (30); 10.8 (68)	Q1; Q2; Q3; Final	5.3 (33); 10.5 (65); 12.9 (81); 14.11 (95)	Umpires: Stewart, Grun, Chamberlain; Television broadcast: Seven
Reimers 2, Monfries, Stanton, Neagle, Marigliani, Howlett, Meyers, Carlisle, Hille	Goals	Brown 4, Banfield 3, Rischitelli 2, Brennan, Adcock, Clark, Polkinghorne, Redden
Howlett, McVeigh, Hurley, Watson, Carlisle, Hille	Best	Brown, McGrath, Leuenberger, Rockliff, Rischitelli, Redden
Ryder (virus) replaced in selected side by Quinn	Injuries	T. Selwood (chest)
Nil	Reports	Nil
Jonathan Brown played his 200th game and kicked four goals as Brisbane defeated Essendon in Melbourne for the first time in four attempts.

==== Round 22 ====
Round 22
28 August 7:10 pm	Brisbane Lions	def. by	Sydney	The Gabba (crowd: 24,789)	Report
3.2 (20); 6.5 (41); 6.7 (43); 10.8 (68)	Q1; Q2; Q3; Final	4.1 (25); 6.4 (40); 11.9 (75); 16.10 (106)	Umpires: Donlon, Stevic, Jeffery; Television broadcast: Fox Sports
Brennan 2, Adcock, Power, Polkinghorne, Banfield, Proud, Collier, Hanley, Staker	Goals	Dennis-Lane 3, Jack 3, O'Keefe, Meredith, Jetta, Shaw, Goodes, Kennedy, J. Bolton, McVeigh, Malceski, Reid
Staker, Brennan, Rockliff, Leuenberger, McGrath	Best	Jack, Malceski, Mattner, Kirk, McVeigh, O'Keefe
Nil	Injuries	Nil
Nil	Reports	Nil

=== Exhibition Match ===
Exhibition Match
17 October 2:10 pm	Melbourne	def.	Brisbane Lions	Jiangwan Sports Centre, Shanghai (crowd: 7,100)	Report
1.4 (10); 4.7 (31); 6.8 (45); 12.12 (84)	Q1; Q2; Q3; Final	3.5 (23); 5.8 (38); 10.11 (71); 11.13 (79)
Jurrah 5, Sylvia 2, Morton 2, Spencer, Bennell, Jamar	Goals	Rockliff 3, Beams 3, Dyson 2, Rich, Buchanan, Rich
Jurrah, Newton, Bartram, Dunn, Sylvia	Best	Rockliff, Dyson, Beams, Merrett, Rich

== Milestones ==
Round	Player	Milestone
1	Matt Maguire	100 games
1	Todd Banfield	Debut
3	Justin Sherman	100 games
5	Mitch Clark	50 games
6	Travis Johnstone	200 games
8	Brendan Fevola	600 goals and one point
10	Luke Power	250 games
11	Michael Rischitelli	100 games
13	Brendan Fevola	200 games
14	Jesse O'Brien	Debut
16	Ashley McGrath	150 games
17	Ryan Harwood	Debut
19	Daniel Merrett	100 games
21	Jonathan Brown	200 games
22	Jed Adcock	100 games
