= 2006 International Rules Series =

- Event: International Rules Series
Ireland	Australia
79	109
- Australia win series 109–79 on aggregate

First test
Ireland	Australia
48	40
- Date: 28 October 2006
- Venue: Pearse Stadium, Galway
- Referee: Pat McEnaney (Ireland); Shane McInerney (Australia)
- Attendance: 35,000

Second test
Australia	Ireland
69	31
- Date: 5 November 2006
- Venue: Croke Park, Dublin
- Referee: David Coldrick (Ireland); Shane McInerney (Australia)
- Attendance: 82,127 (Sell Out)

The 2006 International Rules Series (officially the 2006 Coca-Cola International Rules Series) was the 13th annual International Rules Series and was played between Ireland and Australia.

The 2006 series involved two sell-out test matches, the first in Galway and the second in Dublin. Both of the matches were a landmark occasion for the International Rules Series and Irish sport; the Galway test was the first international rules series match to be played under floodlights in Ireland and the first to be played outside Dublin, whilst the attendance for the second test was the largest in the history of international sport in Ireland.

Both tests were again controversial due to the off-field actions of the Australian team and the on-field actions of both teams, as well as injury to several players from both sides.

== Fixtures ==
- First test: 28 October 2006 at Pearse Stadium, Galway, Ireland
- Second test: 5 November 2006 at Croke Park, Dublin, Ireland

== Controversies ==
=== First test ===
Graham Geraghty was cited for a knee to the head of Australia's Lindsay Gilbee.

Off-field controversy also dominated the series. Brendan Fevola's assault of an Irish barman which resulted in his being sent home from the Australian tour brought the series into question for the behaviour and laid-back attitude which the professional Australian players have towards the series.

=== Second test ===
A tackle by Australia's Danyle Pearce on Ireland's Graham Geraghty in the second test left Geraghty unconscious and requiring hospitalisation. The act was considered a "square up", further adding tensions to the series. Despite several on-field incidents, including a shirtfront by Adam Selwood which resulted in the broken nose of an Irish opponent and a headbutt to Australia's Ryan O'Keefe which left his face bloodied, red cards were not used and the actions were cleared by the match review panels.

Irish coach Seán Boylan publicly blamed thuggery and refereeing for Ireland's loss to Australia and called for the series to be scrapped. In December, 2006, the GAA decided not to participate in the series any further unless the Australians agreed to abide by a code of conduct and stricter rules regarding tackling.

== Jim Stynes Medal ==
Ryan O'Keefe was awarded the Jim Stynes Medal.

== Squads ==
Ireland			Australia		
Name	Team	Position	Name	Team	Position
Seán Boylan	Meath	Coach	Kevin Sheedy	Essendon	Coach
Paul Barden	Longford		Chance Bateman	Hawthorn	
Colm Begley	Brisbane and Laois		Campbell Brown	Hawthorn	
Joe Bergin	Galway		Ryan Crowley	Fremantle	
Alan Brogan	Dublin		Aaron Davey	Melbourne	
Seán Cavanagh	Tyrone		Nick Davis	Sydney	
Rónán Clarke	Armagh		Brendan Fevola	Carlton	
Brendan Coulter	Down		Samuel Fisher	St Kilda	
Kieran Donaghy	Kerry		Dustin Fletcher (c)	Essendon	Goalkeeper
Dermot Earley	Kildare		Lindsay Gilbee	Western Bulldogs	
Kieran Fitzgerald	Galway		Brendon Goddard	St Kilda	
Paul Galvin	Kerry		Barry Hall (c)	Sydney	
Graham Geraghty	Meath		Graham Johncock	Adelaide	
Tom Kelly	Laois		Matthew Lappin	Carlton	
Tadhg Kennelly (vc)	Sydney and Kerry		James McDonald	Melbourne	
Karl Lacey	Donegal		David Mundy	Fremantle	
Seán Marty Lockhart	Derry		Ryan O'Keefe	Sydney	
Steven McDonnell	Armagh		Brett Peake	Fremantle	
Kieran McGeeney (c)	Armagh		Danyle Pearce	Port Adelaide	
Anthony Moyles	Meath		Andrew Raines	Richmond	
Nicholas Murphy	Cork		Adam Schneider	Sydney	
Aidan O'Mahony	Kerry		Adam Selwood	West Coast	
Marc Ó Sé	Kerry		Justin Sherman	Brisbane	
Alan Quirke	Cork		Kade Simpson	Carlton	
Kevin Reilly	Meath		Brent Stanton	Essendon	
Shane Ryan	Dublin		Michael Voss	Brisbane	

- Click here for team squads
- Brendan Fevola was an emergency for the first test, but was sent home before the second game due to public misconduct. He was involved in a fight at a pub.
- Lindsay Gilbee and Sam Fisher only played in the first game, whilst Brett Peake and David Mundy only played in the second test.

== Matches ==
=== First test ===
Team	1	2	3	4	Total
Ireland	0.5.1	0.6.3	0.8.5	1.12.6	(48)
Australia	0.1.1	0.4.2	1.8.3	1.9.7	(40)
Ireland won by 8

Date	Saturday, 28 October 2006
Scoring (IRL)	Goals: Bergin Overs: McDonnell 4, Barden, Begley, Bergin, Brogan, Cavanagh, Earley, Geraghty, Kennelly
Scoring (AUS)	Goals: O'Keefe Overs: O'Keefe 3, Davis 2, Hall 2, Davey, Lappin
Best	IRL: Kelly, McDonnell, Fitzgerald, Bergin, McGeeney, Brogan AUS: Lappin, O'Keefe, Fletcher, Sherman, Hall, Davis
Injuries	Nil
Venue	Pearse Stadium, Galway
Attendance	35,000
Umpires	Pat McEnaney (Ireland); Shane McInerney (Australia)
Video	RTÉ Broadcast of the 1st Test (YouTube)
RTÉ Match report

=== Second test ===
Team	1	2	3	4	Total
Ireland	0.3.1	0.4.4	0.5.5	0.7.10	(31)
Australia	1.3.1	1.6.3	3.11.6	3.15.6	(69)
Australia won by 38

Date	Sunday, 5 November 2006
Scoring (IRL)	Goals: - Overs: Brogan 2, Earley 2, McDonnell 2, Coulter
Scoring (AUS)	Goals: Crowley, Goddard, Stanton Overs: Hall 4, Sherman 3, O'Keefe 2, Pearce 2, Bateman, Davey, Davis, Goddard
Best	IRL: Kelly, Lockhart, Cavanagh, Moyles, Coulter, McDonnell; AUS: Pearce, Sherman, O'Keefe, Hall, Fletcher, Davey
Injuries	IRL: Geraghty (concussion); AUS: Brown (hand/lower back), Crowley (knee)
Venue	Croke Park, Dublin, County Dublin
Attendance	82,127
Umpires	David Coldrick (Ireland); Shane McInerney (Australia)
Video	RTÉ Broadcast of the 2nd Test (YouTube)
RTÉ Match report

== Aftermath ==
As far as I'm concerned what happened out there in that first quarter today is not acceptable in any code of sport. It's not accepted on the street. How that could be termed as playing within the spirit of the game is beyond me.

— Seán Boylan, Ireland coach

The 2006 series is remembered as a significant turning point in the history of international rules football. The physicality and occasional violence in the second test marred the entire contest between the two nations and resulted in the Gaelic Athletic Association (GAA) abandoning the planned 2007 series and only agreeing to resume following a significant change to the game's code of conduct. On the pitch, Ireland manager Seán Boylan had to be convinced by his players not to abandon play at the end of the first, so serious was the off-the-ball meleeing. The sling tackle which resulted in a serious concussion to Ireland player Graham Geraghty and forced play to stop in the first quarter dominated discussion post-match, whilst the trading of barbs and insults between the teams was prolific both before and after the final test.

Don't get blinded by your passion. I think we won well, and I think it's very hard to win in Ireland, and I think we won because we were fitter. Every time Australia win the series is coming to an end. Unbelievable. You're the greatest conmen I've ever met.

— Kevin Sheedy, Australian coach

No player was later sanctioned by the Australian Football League (AFL) and GAA following the series, though a number of yellow cards (send-offs) were issued to players by both referees. The series would later go on to be ranked 10th by the Irish public in the one-off television program 20 Moments That Shook Irish Sport. Despite eventually returning in 2008, the International Rules Series struggled to maintain a place on the annual Irish and Australian sporting calendars, and the no test match since has come remotely close to the rivalling the sell-out crowd 82,000 who attended the second test match on a Sunday afternoon at Croke Park. Others editorialised that the disgruntlement in the series demonstrated a difference in cultural values regarding aspects of the Indigenous Gaelic and Australian games such as umpiring methods and types of physicality deemed tolerable in the two sports.

== See also ==
- International rules football
- Gaelic football
- Australian rules football
- Comparison of Australian rules football and Gaelic football
