= Barry Hall =

Australian rules footballer (born 1977)

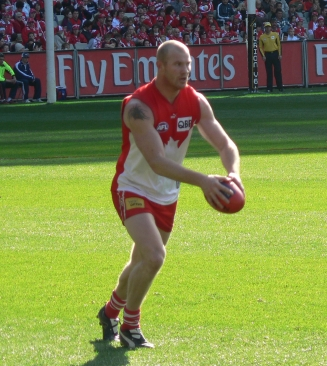
- Hall playing for Sydney in August 2006

Personal information
- Full name: Barry Andrew Hall
- Nicknames: Bazza, Big Bad Barry
- Born: 8 February 1977 (age 49); Victoria
- Original teams: Avenel, Murray Bushrangers (TAC Cup)
- Draft: No. 19, 1995 national draft
- Height: 194 cm (6 ft 4 in)
- Weight: 104 kg (229 lb)
- Position: Forward

Playing career^{1}
Years	Club	Games (Goals)
1996–2001	St Kilda	88 (144)
2002–2009	Sydney	162 (467)
2010–2011	Western Bulldogs	39 (135)
Total		289 (746)

International team honours
Years	Team	Games (Goals)
2003–2006	Australia	4
- ^{1} Playing statistics correct to the end of 2011.

Career highlights
- AFL premiership player: 2005; Sydney captain: 2005–2008; AFLCA Champion Player of the Year: 2005; 2× St Kilda leading goalkicker: 1999, 2001; 7× Sydney leading goalkicker: 2002, 2003, 2004, 2005, 2006, 2007, 2008; 2× Western Bulldogs leading goalkicker: 2010, 2011; 4× All-Australian team: 2004, 2005, 2006, 2010; Bob Skilton Medal: 2004; Michael Tuck Medal: 2010; AFL Hall of Fame member.

Barry Andrew Hall (born 8 February 1977) is a former professional Australian rules footballer who played for the St Kilda Football Club, Sydney Swans and Western Bulldogs in the Australian Football League (AFL). He is considered to be one of the best forwards of the modern era, being named All Australian, leading his club's goalkicking on eleven occasions and captaining the Sydney Swans to their 2005 AFL Grand Final victory. He was the first player to kick 100 career goals for three AFL teams.

Hall began his career at the St Kilda Football Club where he twice led the club's goalkicking in 1999 and 2001. He is best known for his career with the Sydney Swans. He was one of the Swans' best players during his time at the club, topping the club goalkicking from 2002 to 2008 and co-captaining the side from 2005 to 2007, including the club's drought breaking premiership in 2005. He also featured heavily in the AFL's promotion in Sydney, gaining a similarly high-profile to Tony Lockett which saw him featured in a 2006 AFL and Swans joint promotion known as "Barry Hall Hall".

The former junior boxing champion's AFL career was marred by a reputation for on-field aggression, which earned him the nickname "Big Bad Barry Hall". Several controversial and highly publicised incidents (often called "brain snaps" by the media) and tribunal appearances interrupted his career and contributed to Hall changing clubs.

== Early life ==
Hall was born in Victoria and grew up in Broadford, where he played his junior football. His other interests were martial arts and boxing. At the age of 12 he moved to Melbourne to pursue a boxing career. Training in a makeshift boxing gym in his father's garage, he won a state title in his early teenage years and had fought in 15 fights by the age of 15.

Hall also showed a talent for Australian football. After playing for the Murray Bushrangers in the TAC Cup and attracting the eye of talent scouts, he decided to focus on football.

== AFL career ==
=== St Kilda (1996–2001) ===
Hall made his AFL debut for St Kilda in 1996. He helped fill the void of the record-breaking forward Tony Lockett, who had moved to the Swans the previous season. His most memorable performance for the Saints was his 3-goal burst during a five-minute period in the second quarter of the 1997 Grand Final, in which put his side in a strong position going into half-time, despite St Kilda going on to be defeated by Adelaide by 31 points at the MCG. He played for St Kilda until 2001, kicking 144 goals in 88 games and being the club's leading goalkicker in the 1999 and 2001 seasons. He kicked a career-best 8 goals in Round 16, 2001 against the Western Bulldogs. He left St Kilda at the end of 2001 in style, kicking a goal after the final siren of a Round 22 match against Hawthorn to win the match. One of the main reasons for leaving was the rise of Nick Riewoldt, Justin Koschitzke and the recruitment of Fraser Gehrig, as well as salary cap constraints.

=== Sydney Swans (2002–2009) ===
Hall joined the Swans for the 2002 season and prospered under the coaching of Paul Roos. He led the club's goalscoring in every season up until 2009 and was named club Best and Fairest in 2004. He has said that he benefited from the move to Sydney, in particular the relative anonymity he enjoyed when first arriving, playing alongside Tony Lockett in Lockett's comeback-from-retirement season. Hall's form reached a high in 2004 when he was named in the All-Australian team. He then took his game to a whole new level from 2005, and not only bagged 80 goals for the season and a second placing for the Coleman Medal, but set up many more goals as well. He was selected in the All-Australian list in 2005 and 2006 and captained the Swans to their historic 2005 Grand Final premiership victory, their first since 1933. He led the Swans goalkicking in seasons 2005 to 2006, and in that two-year period he kicked two bags of seven against Essendon in their matches in Melbourne (a win in 2005 but a loss in 2006). He also led the club's goalkicking in seasons 2007 and 2008, but in those two seasons he struggled with suspension and injury. He has also kicked big bags of goals against notably weaker opponents such as Carlton.

Hall earned a reputation as a controversial player, with several appearances at the tribunal resulting in four suspensions for a total of 10 matches. He has given away almost twice as many free kicks as he has been given over his career, and in 2003 Swans coach Paul Roos questioned whether Hall was given all the free kicks he deserved. Hall struggled with injuries through the 2007 season and his form was generally considered to be somewhat down from his peak, although he played a number of outstanding games and still led the club's goalkicking with 44. In 2008, Hall began the season in good form but, following a punch thrown against West Coast Eagles player Brent Staker and a further incident where he aimed a punch at a Collingwood player, he missed a number of games and was suspended from the Swans' team on 8 July 2008.

In Round 19, 2008, against the Fremantle Football Club, he kicked the last goal in the final minute and won the game by four points. He kicked a bag of goals in that game and in Round 20, against the Geelong Cats, he kicked five goals and one behind. In spite of the Swans' 39-point defeat to the reigning premiers he was the leading goalkicker for the game. In 2008 Hall was awarded the Paul Roos Award for the best player in the finals. He finished the year as Sydney's leading goalkicker for the seventh consecutive year, equalling the club record of Len Mortimer.

Hall kicked his 600th career goal against the Western Bulldogs in Round 10, 2009, when he kicked six in that game. After a striking incident involving Adelaide's Ben Rutten in his 250th game, Hall was put under an immense amount of pressure from coach Paul Roos to leave the club. Hall called a press conference on 7 July 2009 to announce that he was no longer going to play for the Swans. He kicked four goals in his last game for the club.

=== Western Bulldogs (2010–2011) ===
It was announced on 6 October 2009 that the Western Bulldogs had agreed to trade draft pick 47 for Hall with Sydney. On his Bulldogs' debut, in the second round of the 2010 NAB Cup, he kicked six goals against Hawthorn. He then kicked four goals against Port Adelaide and had a part in the final and winning goal which gave the Bulldogs a place in the NAB Cup grand final against his first club, St Kilda. In the final he kicked seven goals, including five in the last quarter, to lead the Bulldogs to their first grand final success of any kind since 1970. He was awarded the Michael Tuck Medal for best on ground. He made his home-and-away debut for the Bulldogs in Round 1 against Collingwood at Docklands Stadium, but his side were defeated by 36 points. Hall kicked three goals.

Hall's good form at the Bulldogs continued, with four and five goals in successive games helping him get back to his best form of his early years at the Sydney Swans. In 2010 Hall was tripped by Essendon defender and rival Dustin Fletcher in Round 10, costing Fletcher a one-match suspension. In Round 15 in 2010, he kicked six goals against Carlton and also suffered an ankle injury. He finished second on the 2010 Coleman Medal table with 73 goals in the home and away season, behind Richmond's Jack Riewoldt. He kicked his 700th goal against the Gold Coast Suns in Round 3, 2011 and in Round 17, 2011 against North Melbourne he became the first player to kick over 100 goals for three clubs when he kicked five goals.

On 19 July 2011, Hall announced his intention to retire at the end of the 2011 season. Despite captaining Sydney to their 2005 premiership, Hall stated that he wanted to be remembered as a Bulldogs player due to them giving him a last chance at playing AFL football in 2010. Coincidentally, this announcement came in the week leading up to the Bulldogs' clash against the Swans at the Sydney Cricket Ground; in that match, he kicked five goals as the Bulldogs lost by 39 points.

Hall ended his AFL career with 40 goals in his last eight matches and 55 overall for the 2011 AFL season. In his final three games, he was coached by his 2005 Sydney premiership teammate Paul Williams, who had taken over from Rodney Eade (also his coach at the Swans in the first half of 2002) at the conclusion of round 21. In total he kicked 746 career AFL goals, placing him 16th on the all-time goal-kicking list.

== Controversies ==
=== Sam McFarlane incident ===
Whilst playing in a reserves game for St Kilda against North Melbourne in Round 14 in 1997, Hall struck Sam McFarlane, a slightly built wingman, in the jaw, breaking it in three places. McFarlane spent the next three days in hospital getting the jaw wired back together and was sidelined for ten weeks. Although McFarlane returned for the final two games of the year, he never returned to play league football again.

=== Steven Febey incident ===
In the 1998 second semi-final St Kilda held the lead over Melbourne near the end of the second quarter. After being tackled by Steven Febey, Hall dropped his knees into Febey's head and after regaining his feet he slung Adem Yze to the ground. In frustration his outburst lead to an altercation with teammates Matthew Lappin and Shane Wakelin where Hall had to be restrained by his teammates and trainers. Melbourne then took control of the match and won easily, ending St Kilda's 1998 season. The incident resulted in a four-match suspension.

=== Matthew Primus incident ===
In July 2002, while playing for Sydney, Hall was suspended for five matches after being found guilty of clawing the face of Port Adelaide ruckman Matthew Primus during a Swans loss at the SCG. Hall had been charged on video evidence with making "unreasonable and unnecessary contact to the face". Hall acknowledged he had made contact with Primus's face, but denied he had tried to eye-gouge him. "I made face contact which I regret, but it certainly looks worse than what it was" said Hall.

=== Matt Maguire incident ===
After an incident involving a punch to the stomach of St Kilda's Matt Maguire in a 2005 preliminary final match, Hall was reported for a level two striking and offered a one-week suspension for a guilty plea. This suspension would have meant missing the next week's grand final. Hall's representation successfully argued that the incident was 'in play' despite the ball being 50 metres away. As a result, the charge was reduced to a level one offence which reduced the penalty to a reprimand and he went on to captain the Swans to their first premiership in 72 years, defeating the West Coast Eagles in the grand final by four points.

=== Brent Staker incident ===
In an incident which shocked Sydney and West Coast fans alike, in Round 4, 2008, Hall was reported for striking West Coast Eagles defender Brent Staker. Video footage from the incident indicated that contact was made with a punch to the jaw. Staker took no further part in the game, remaining off the field for the duration of the game. Later in the same game, Hall broke his wrist on the metal railing behind a soft cardboard advertising board. After the game the Match Review Panel ranked the incident as intentional, severe impact and high contact, therefore the offence was directly referred to the AFL Tribunal. He was subsequently suspended for seven games, one of the most severe punishments in the modern era by the AFL Tribunal. Video footage of the incident was shown on television as far abroad as Denmark and the United States on the ESPN network.

=== Shane Wakelin incident ===
Hall was handed a one-match suspension for an attempted strike on Collingwood's Shane Wakelin, his former St Kilda teammate, in Round 14, 2008. Sydney later announced the team would not play Hall indefinitely. Sydney co-captain Brett Kirk later claimed that Hall's habit of hitting opposition players off the ball is a "bad habit".

=== Scott Thompson incident ===
On 22 May 2010 Hall was again the centre of attention when he was pushed over by North Melbourne defender Scott Thompson while tying his shoelace, triggering an ugly altercation between Hall and several other North Melbourne players. Hall reacted to the taunts by putting Thompson in a headlock and was subsequently reported for both wrestling and rough conduct. He was later found guilty of wrestling and fined, but not guilty of rough conduct.

== Statistics ==
Legend
G	Goals	K	Kicks	D	Disposals	T	Tackles
B	Behinds	H	Handballs	M	Marks

Season	Team	No.	Games	Totals							Averages (per game)						
Season	Team	No.	Games	G	B	K	H	D	M	T	G	B	K	H	D	M	T
1996	St Kilda	25	4	2	3	18	13	31	10	4	0.5	0.8	4.5	3.3	7.8	2.5	1.0
1997	St Kilda	25	15	14	13	70	58	128	52	22	0.9	0.9	4.7	3.9	8.5	3.5	1.5
1998	St Kilda	25	13	6	4	57	36	93	28	9	0.5	0.3	4.4	2.8	7.2	2.2	0.7
1999	St Kilda	25	20	41	36	184	58	242	141	13	2.1	1.8	9.2	2.9	12.1	7.1	0.7
2000	St Kilda	25	19	37	21	151	74	225	126	13	1.9	1.1	7.9	3.9	11.8	6.6	0.7
2001	St Kilda	25	17	44	23	140	36	176	97	12	2.6	1.4	8.2	2.1	10.4	5.7	0.7
2002	Sydney	1	17	55	31	154	36	190	114	10	3.2	1.8	9.1	2.1	11.2	6.7	0.6
2003	Sydney	1	24	64	35	218	73	291	167	22	2.7	1.5	9.1	3.0	12.1	7.0	0.9
2004	Sydney	1	24	74	39	244	101	345	191	30	3.1	1.6	10.2	4.2	14.4	8.0	1.3
2005	Sydney	1	26	80	41	299	91	390	206	32	3.1	1.6	11.5	3.5	15.0	7.9	1.2
2006	Sydney	1	25	78	38	283	82	365	216	49	3.1	1.5	11.3	3.3	14.6	8.6	2.0
2007	Sydney	1	20	44	30	176	62	238	135	24	2.2	1.5	8.8	3.1	11.9	6.8	1.2
2008	Sydney	1	15	41	36	165	40	205	132	11	2.7	2.4	11.0	2.7	13.7	8.8	0.7
2009	Sydney	1	11	31	13	82	29	111	64	17	2.8	1.2	7.5	2.6	10.1	5.8	1.5
2010	Western Bulldogs	28	24	80	41	191	81	272	143	28	3.3	1.7	8.0	3.4	11.3	6.0	1.2
2011	Western Bulldogs	28	15	55	17	112	38	150	75	12	3.7	1.1	7.5	2.5	10.0	5.0	0.8
Career			289	746	421	2544	908	3452	1897	308	2.6	1.5	8.8	3.1	11.9	6.6	1.1

== Honours and achievements ==
Brownlow Medal votes
Season	Votes
1996	0
1997	0
1998	0
1999	9
2000	3
2001	6
2002	11
2003	7
2004	11
2005	16
2006	8
2007	3
2008	4
2009	3
2010	11
2011	0
Total	92

Team

- AFL premiership (Sydney): 2005 (c)
- McClelland Trophy (St Kilda): 1997
- Pre-season cup (Western Bulldogs): 2010

Individual

- Sydney Swans captain: 2005–2008
- Bob Skilton Medal (Sydney Swans best and fairest award): 2004
- All-Australian: 2004, 2005, 2006 (vc), 2010
- AFLCA Champion Player of the Year Award: 2005
- St Kilda leading goalkicker: 1999, 2001
- Sydney Swans leading goalkicker: 2002, 2003, 2004, 2005, 2006, 2007, 2008
- Western Bulldogs leading goalkicker: 2010, 2011
- Michael Tuck Medal: 2010
- Australian representative honours in International Rules Football: 2003, 2006 (c)

== Personal life ==
Hall met South African television personality, Lauren Brant, while filming I'm a Celebrity...Get Me Out of Here! in South Africa in 2015. The pair confirmed they were dating in November 2016. In May 2017 Brant and Hall announced the birth of their baby boy, Miller Hall. The two secretly got married on 17 February 2021, a week before Brant's 32nd birthday. The pair have since had three more sons: Houston (born May 2019), Samson (born October 2021) and Clay (born July 2024).

Prior to Laura, Barry married Sophie Raadschelder after dating for about a year in November 2011. They separated in early 2015.

Hall's personal life has hit the media tabloids on several occasions, with his much publicised relationships with Kylie Stray and bikini model Tahli Greenwood.

Hall's other interests include gardening and collecting fast cars, including vintage cars and drag racing cars.

== Outside football ==
Hall has been the centrepiece of advertising campaigns, including the "Barry Hall Hall" and "Excitement Machine Machine" 2006 television and internet campaign in Sydney by George Patterson Y&R for the Australian Football League which was a finalist at the Australian Interactive Media Industry Association and Melbourne Advertising & Design Club awards and also the "Barry Hall vs Broadford" 2007 advertisement by JWT Melbourne for Ford Australia pitting Barry Hall against his junior club (with cameos from Hall's nephew and aunt).

In 2008 Hall appeared in a series of "Barry Hall Hall" ads; however, these were pulled from the air following the Brent Staker incident.

In 2013, he joined Fox Footy as a boundary rider.

In 2015, Hall appeared in the Australian version of I'm a Celebrity...Get Me Out of Here!. Another contestant on that show was Lauren Brant with whom he developed a relationship. The couple have three boys. He married Brant in February 2021.

In 2018, Hall was immediately dismissed from radio station Triple M after making on-air remarks which were deemed unacceptable and inappropriate by station management.

Hall participated on the third season of the Seven Network's reality quasi-military training television programme SAS Australia: Who Dares Wins, which premiered on 21 February 2022.

In June 2025, Hall appeared in the music video for "Keith" by Australian band Playlunch, portraying the song's titular bogan neighbour who becomes enraged any time someone uses the parking space outside his house.. The song went on to win number 4 in 2025's triple j hottest 100.

== Boxing career ==
Barry Hall
Personal information
- Height: 1.94 m (6 ft 4 in)

Boxing career
- Weight class: Heavyweight
- Reach: 194 cm (76 in)
- Stance: Orthodox

Boxing record
- Total fights: 3
- Wins: 0
- Win by KO: 0
- Losses: 2
- Draws: 1

In the middle of 2019, it was announced that Hall would make his professional boxing debut at the age of 42 with his opponent being former rugby league footballer Paul Gallen. In the lead-up to the fight, Hall said of Gallen, "I know it’s been painted as a code war, but even the support I’ve been getting off rugby league people has been overwhelming, He’s not a very liked human being … so I’ve got a lot of support.” The fight ended in a draw.

In June 2021 Hall confirmed he will undertake another two fights. Hall squared off against Sonny Bill Williams in his second professional fight on March 23, 2022, in which the referee stopped the fight after Hall was dropped three times by Williams in the first round. Williams won by TKO.

After a two year hiatus, Hall returned for his third professional fight on 10 July 2024, against another former rugby league player, Curtis Scott, in Wollongong. Hall was knocked out in 87 seconds by Scott, 21 years his junior, casting doubts on his future in the sport.

=== Professional boxing record ===
Result	Record	Opponent	Type	Round	Date	Location	Notes
Loss	0–2–1	(Australia) Curtis Scott	TKO	1	10 July, 2024	Wollongong Entertainment Centre, Wollongong, Australia	
Loss	0–1–1	(New Zealand) Sonny Bill Williams	TKO	1	23 March, 2022	Aware Super Theatre, Sydney, Australia	
Draw	0–0–1	(Australia) Paul Gallen	MD	6	15 Nov, 2019	Margaret Court Arena, Melbourne, Australia	

== See also ==
- After the siren kicks in Australian rules football
