= 2007 International Rules Series =

The 2007 International Rules Series was to be the 14th series of international rules football to be played between Ireland and Australia since the establishment of the annual international rules series tournament and the 16th tour overall and was to have been held in Australia. The tour, however, was cancelled after violence marred the 2005 and 2006 series, with much of the blame being laid by Irish commentators on the rough tactics of the Australian team. In December 2006, the GAA decided to abandon the 2007 series.

"On the recommendation of the Management Committee, it was agreed that there would be no Junior or Senior Series of games in 2007."

The series was renewed in 2008.
