= 2010 NAB Cup =

- Season: 2010
- Teams: 16
- Winners: Western Bulldogs (1st title)
- Matches played: 15
- Attendance: 227,481 (average 15,165 per match)
- Michael Tuck Medallist: Barry Hall (Western Bulldogs)

The 2010 NAB Cup was the Australian Football League (AFL) pre-season competition that was played before the 2010 season. The games were played between 12 February and 13 March, with the first match being between West Coast and Essendon at Subiaco Oval. It was the last pre-season competition held in the current knockout format due to the entry of the Gold Coast Suns into the AFL in 2011.

== Games ==
=== Round 1 ===
	Round 1
Friday, 12 February (5:40 pm)	West Coast 1.16.12 (117)	def.	Essendon 0.12.10 (82)	Subiaco Oval (crowd: 23,860)	Report
Saturday, 13 February (4:10 pm)	Adelaide 1.8.10 (67)	def. by	Port Adelaide 2.15.15 (123)	AAMI Stadium (crowd: 14,663)	Report
Saturday, 13 February (7:40 pm)	Hawthorn 3.16.12 (135)	def.	Richmond 0.9.8 (62)	Aurora Stadium (crowd: 11,217)	Report
Sunday, 14 February (4:40 pm)	Western Bulldogs 1.5.14 (53)	def.	Brisbane Lions 1.5.6 (45)	Manuka Oval (crowd: 3,707)	Report
Friday, 19 February (7:40 pm)	St Kilda 2.13.4 (100)	def.	Collingwood 1.13.12 (99)	Etihad Stadium (crowd: 29,801)	Report
Saturday, 20 February (7:40 pm)	Sydney 2.7.11 (71)	def.	Carlton 0.8.11 (59)	Blacktown Olympic Park (crowd: 9,732)	Report
Sunday, 21 February (4:40 pm)	Geelong 2.10.3 (81)	def. by	North Melbourne 2.11.11 (95)	Etihad Stadium (crowd: 12,989)	Report
Sunday, 21 February (5:40 pm)	Fremantle 1.13.10 (97)	def.	Melbourne 2.4.8 (50)	Subiaco Oval (crowd: 11,031)	Report

=== Round 2 ===
	Round 2
Friday, 26 February (7:40 pm)	Hawthorn 0.7.12 (54)	def. by	Western Bulldogs 1.15.12 (111)	Etihad Stadium (crowd: 17,222)	Report
Saturday, 27 February (7:10 pm)	St Kilda 2.9.7 (79)	def.	Sydney 0.12.6 (78)	Etihad Stadium (crowd: 10,998)	Report
Saturday, 27 February (5:40 pm)	West Coast 2.8.14 (80)	def. by	Port Adelaide 4.19.8 (158)	Subiaco Oval (crowd: 16,231)	Report
Sunday, 28 February (5:10 pm)	North Melbourne 0.13.12 (90)	def. by	Fremantle 1.12.13 (94)	Etihad Stadium (crowd: 7,877)	Report

=== Round 3 ===
	Round 3
Friday, 5 March (7:40 pm)	Western Bulldogs 1.11.17 (92)	def.	Port Adelaide 1.12.8 (89)	Etihad Stadium (crowd: 10,531)
Saturday, 6 March (7:10 pm)	St Kilda 2.15.7 (115)	def.	Fremantle 2.3.9 (45)	Etihad Stadium (crowd: 5,241)
Both games were played in Melbourne, due to the Adelaide Festival restricting accommodation in Adelaide and Subiaco Oval being used for the AC/DC concerts.

=== Grand final ===
2010 NAB Cup Grand Final
Saturday, 13 March (7:10 pm)	Western Bulldogs	def.	St Kilda	Etihad Stadium (crowd: 42,381)	Report
0.4.5 (29); 1.5.6 (45); 2.7.7 (67); 2.13.8 (104)	Q1; Q2; Q3; Final	0.1.1 (7); 0.3.5 (23); 0.7.10 (52); 0.9.10 (64)	Umpires: Rosebury, Stevic, Chamberlain; Michael Tuck Medal: Barry Hall (Western Bulldogs); Television broadcast: Ten Network
Hahn, Higgins	Super Goals
Hall 7, Higgins 2, Akermanis, Everitt, Murphy, Griffen	Goals	Riewoldt 4, Gram, Goddard, Milne, Geary, Koschitzke
Hall, Cooney, Griffen, Boyd, Higgins, Murphy, Gilbee, Hudson	Best	Riewoldt, Goddard, Dal Santo, Gram, Jones, Montagna
Hahn (cracked eye socket), Eagleton (back/hamstring), Ward (groin).	Injuries	S Fisher (ankle).
Nil	Reports	Nil

== Results ==
Round 1
West Coast	117
Essendon	82
Adelaide	67
Port Adelaide	123
Hawthorn	135
Richmond	62
Western Bulldogs	53
Brisbane Lions	45
St Kilda	100
Collingwood	99
Sydney	71
Carlton	59
Geelong	81
North Melbourne	94
Fremantle	97
Melbourne	50

Round 2
West Coast	80
Port Adelaide	158
Hawthorn	54
Western Bulldogs	111
St Kilda	79
Sydney	78
North Melbourne	90
Fremantle	94

Round 3
Port Adelaide	89
Western Bulldogs	92
St Kilda	115
Fremantle	45

Grand final
Western Bulldogs	104
St Kilda	64

== NAB Challenge ==
	Week 1
Friday, 26 February (7:00 pm)	Collingwood 11.8 (74)	def.	Adelaide 8.6 (54)	Traeger Park	Report
Friday, 26 February (4:00 pm)	Carlton 14.9 (93)	def.	Brisbane Lions 12.8 (80)	Visy Park	Report
Saturday, 27 February (1:00 pm)	Melbourne 11.14 (80)	def. by	Essendon 18.12 (120)	Visy Park	Report
Saturday, 27 February (4:00 pm)	Geelong 7.9 (51)	def. by	Richmond 15.12 (102)	Yea Recreation Reserve	Report

	Week 2
Friday, 5 March (4:00 pm)	Richmond 9.8 (62)	def. by	Collingwood 11.24 (90)	Visy Park
Saturday, 6 March (10:30 am)	West Coast 16.9 (105)	def.	Carlton 9.12 (66)	Leederville Oval
Saturday, 6 March (2:00 pm)	Hawthorn 6.7 (43)	def. by	North Melbourne 12.11 (83)	Eureka Stadium
Saturday, 6 March (cancelled)	Brisbane Lions	v	Geelong	Visy Park	Report
Saturday, 6 March (4:00 pm)	Adelaide 9.15 (69)	def.	Melbourne 10.7 (67)	Elizabeth Oval
Saturday, 6 March (7:00 pm)	Sydney 14.7 (91)	def.	Essendon 9.9 (63)	Blacktown Olympic Park
The match between Brisbane Lions and Geelong was originally scheduled to be held at Fankhauser Reserve in Southport, Queensland but was moved to Visy Park due to flooding in that region of Queensland. Severe storms in Melbourne that coincided with the start time for the relocated match, led to the match being cancelled.

	Week 3
Friday, 12 March (3:30 pm)	Brisbane Lions 7.14 (56)	def.	Hawthorn 6.9 (45)	Fankhauser Reserve	Report
Friday, 12 March (4:00 pm)	Carlton 11.16 (82)	def. by	Adelaide 12.11 (83)	Visy Park	Report
Friday, 12 March (7:00 pm)	Sydney 14.15 (99)	def.	North Melbourne 8.9 (57)	Narrandera Sportsground	Report
Saturday, 13 March (2:00 pm)	Melbourne 12.14 (86)	def. by	West Coast 18.16 (124)	Casey Fields	Report
Saturday, 13 March (3:30 pm)	Richmond 11.7 (73)	def. by	Essendon 23.9 (147)	Morwell Recreation Reserve	Report
Saturday, 13 March (3:00 pm)	Port Adelaide 15.7 (97)	def. by	Collingwood 27.16 (178)	Malseed Park	Report
Saturday, 13 March (4:30 pm)	Fremantle 10.5 (65)	def. by	Geelong 14.12 (96)	Fremantle Oval (crowd: 10,000)	Report

== See also ==
- 2010 AFL season
