= Tom Rockliff =

Australian rules footballer

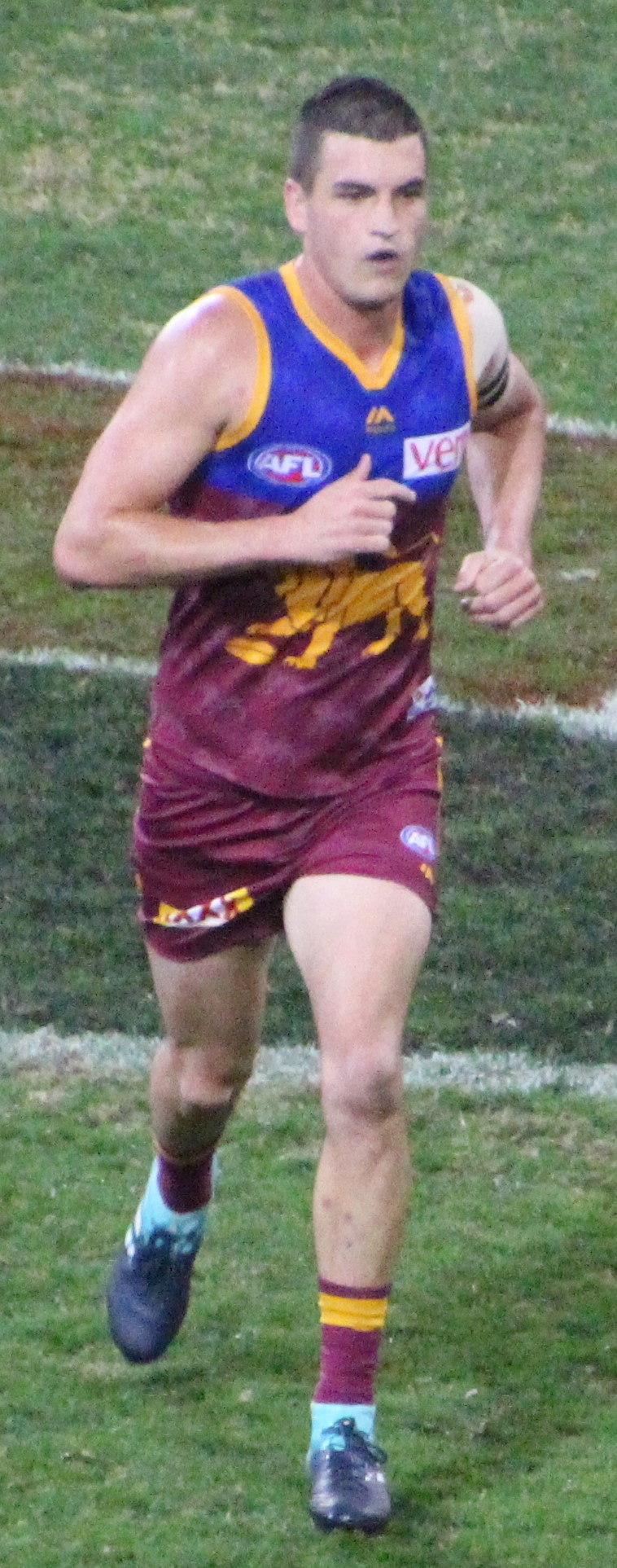
- Rockliff with the Brisbane Lions in August 2017

Personal information
- Full name: Thomas Rockliff
- Nicknames: Rocky, Tom, Pig
- Born: 22 February 1990 (age 36); Lismore, New South Wales, Australia
- Original teams: Benalla, Murray Bushrangers (TAC Cup)
- Draft: No. 5, 2009 pre-season draft
- Height: 185 cm (6 ft 1 in)
- Weight: 85 kg (187 lb)
- Position: Midfielder

Playing career
Years	Club	Games (Goals)
2009–2017	Brisbane Lions	154 (87)
2018–2021	Port Adelaide	54 (13)
Total		208 (100)

Career highlights
- Brisbane Lions Captain: 2015–2016; Merrett–Murray Medal: 2011, 2014; All-Australian: 2014; Marcus Ashcroft Medal: 2012; AFL Rising Star nominee: 2010

Thomas Rockliff (born 22 February 1990) is a former professional Australian rules footballer who played for the Port Adelaide Football Club and previously played for the Brisbane Lions Football Club for 154 games between 2009 and 2017. In 2008 Rockliff, a medium-sized, smart and creative forward, was the leading goalkicker in the TAC Cup with 59 goals and won the Murray Bushrangers' best and fairest award, but was overlooked in the main draft. He was, however, drafted by the Brisbane Lions with the fifth selection in the 2009 pre-season draft. He served as the captain of the Brisbane Lions in 2015 and 2016.

== AFL career ==
=== Brisbane Lions (2009–2017) ===
Rockliff made his AFL debut in round 18, 2009 against Collingwood, which was the only match he played that season. He recorded five possessions as Brisbane lost by 40 points.

In 2010, Rockliff forced his way back into the senior Brisbane Lions side in round 3, 2010 where he has since featured predominantly in the midfield rotation. He received an AFL Rising Star nomination in round 13, 2010 and despite being heavily favoured to win the award, he finished third behind winner Dan Hannebery and Tom Scully in the end of year voting.

For the 2011 season with the Lions, who finished 15th on the ladder after only managing four wins, Rockliff averaged 27.7 disposals, 5.6 marks and 5.4 tackles per game. Rockliff was rewarded by winning the club's best and fairest award over favourite Simon Black, who also had a strong season.

For the 2013 season, Rockliff averaged 27.3 disposals and recording 30 more disposals 9 times. Rockliff also finished equal fifth in the Brownlow Medal count, polling 21 votes.

In 2014, Rockliff established himself as one of the elite midfielders of the competition, averaging a league-high 32.7 disposals and 9.1 tackles a game and recording 40 or more disposals five times. In round 18 in the Q-Clash against Gold Coast, Rockliff gathered a career-high 47 disposals (31 kicks and 16 handballs) as well as 10 tackles. Rockliff was awarded his second Merrett–Murray Medal as Brisbane's best and fairest player. Rockliff was also selected in the 2014 All-Australian Team on the Interchange after his remarkable season that was recognised.

In January 2015, it was announced that Rockliff would become the next captain of the Brisbane Lions, succeeding Jed Adcock. He lasted two years in the role and was succeeded by Dayne Beams in 2017. Following the end of the 2017 season, Rockliff began seeking a contract away from Brisbane.

=== Port Adelaide (2018–2021) ===
Rockliff joined Port Adelaide as a restricted free agent during the 2017 trade period after Brisbane elected not to match Port Adelaide's contract offer. He announced his immediate retirement on August 8, 2021, citing injuries.

== Statistics ==
Statistics are correct to the end of the 2017 season

Legend
G	Goals	K	Kicks	D	Disposals	T	Tackles
B	Behinds	H	Handballs	M	Marks

Led the league after season and finals

Season	Team	No.	Games	Totals							Averages (per game)						
Season	Team	No.	Games	G	B	K	H	D	M	T	G	B	K	H	D	M	T
2009	Brisbane Lions	38	1	0	0	3	2	5	3	1	0.0	0.0	3.0	2.0	5.0	3.0	1.0
2010	Brisbane Lions	38	19	4	5	220	214	434	103	64	0.2	0.3	11.6	11.3	22.8	5.4	3.4
2011	Brisbane Lions	38	20	12	10	310	244	554	111	108	0.6	0.5	15.5	12.2	27.7	5.6	5.4
2012	Brisbane Lions	38	22	18	17	280	256	536	87	95	0.8	0.8	12.7	11.6	24.4	4.0	4.3
2013	Brisbane Lions	38	21	7	8	291	284	575	95	108	0.3	0.4	13.9	13.5	27.4	4.5	5.1
2014	Brisbane Lions	38	18	10	3	309	280	589	96	163	0.6	0.2	17.2	15.5	32.7	5.3	9.1
2015	Brisbane Lions	38	16	5	3	174	220	394	71	129	0.3	0.2	10.9	13.8	24.6	4.4	8.1
2016	Brisbane Lions	38	17	15	3	243	265	508	67	117	0.9	0.2	14.3	15.6	29.9	3.9	6.9
2017	Brisbane Lions	38	20	16	5	268	212	480	106	117	0.8	0.3	13.4	10.6	24.0	5.3	5.9
Career			154	87	54	2098	1977	4075	739	902	0.6	0.4	13.6	12.8	26.5	4.8	5.9

== Honours and achievements ==
Brownlow Medal votes
Season	Votes
2009	—
2010	—
2011	9
2012	8
2013	21
2014	15
2015	4
2016	9
2017	2
2018	3
Total	68

Team

- NAB Cup (Brisbane Lions): 2013
- McClelland Trophy (Port Adelaide): 2020

Individual

- Merrett–Murray Medal (Brisbane Best & Fairest): 2011, 2014
- All-Australian: 2014
- Marcus Ashcroft Medal: 2012 (Round 4)
- AFL Rising Star Nominee: 2010 (Round 13)
- Australian Representative Honours in International Rules Football: 2014, 2015
