= Dylan Addison =

Australian rules footballer

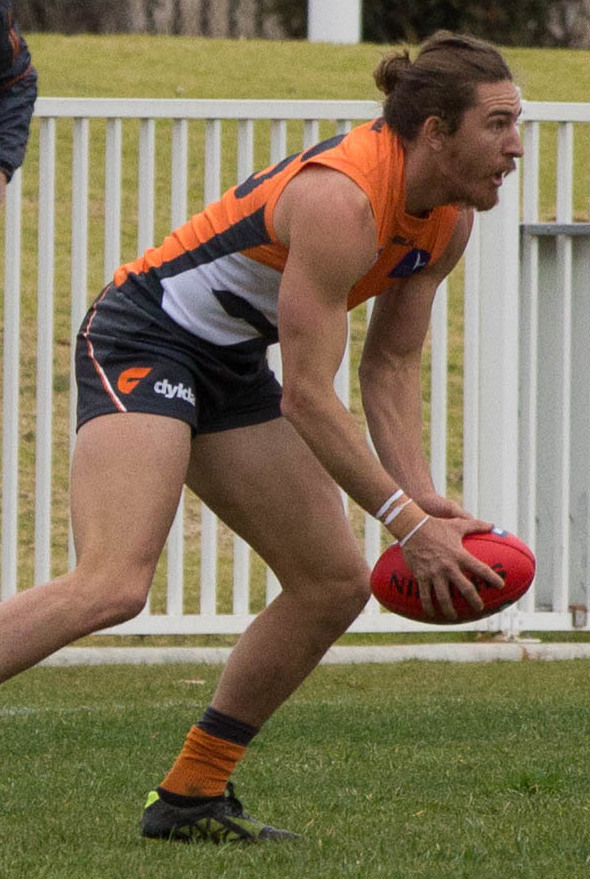
- Golds in August 2015

Personal information
- Full name: Dylan Addison
- Born: 7 October 1987 (age 39)
- Original team: St George (Sydney AFL)
- Draft: No. 27, 2005 national draft
- Height: 185 cm (6 ft 1 in)
- Weight: 82 kg (181 lb)
- Position: Utility

Playing career^{1}
Years	Club	Games (Goals)
2006–2013	Western Bulldogs	88 (30)
2014–2015	Greater Western Sydney	5 (0)
Total		93 (30)
- ^{1} Playing statistics correct to the end of 2015.

Dylan Addison (born 7 October 1987) is a former professional Australian rules footballer who played for the Western Bulldogs (where he was fondly known as "DFA") and Greater Western Sydney Giants in the Australian Football League (AFL). He was drafted with the 27th overall selection in the 2005 national draft by the Western Bulldogs. He grew up in the south-west Sydney suburb of Picnic Point, with his father, mother and two brothers.

The Western Bulldogs were perceived to have taken a bit of a gamble in using such a high draft selection on a young player from the suburbs of Sydney, which traditionally is not an Australian football area. Addison was one of the better NSW-ACT Rams players in the 2005 AFL Under-18 Championships, coming via the St George Crows in the SFL. He attended St Gregory's College, Campbelltown and completed his HSC in 2005.

Addison started his career by playing as a medium forward, or on the ball, under the tutelage of head coach Rodney Eade. Although his career between 2006–2011 was positively noted for his hard-attack on the football, he was subject to criticism regarding his disposal efficiency, a facet of his game play that saw him in-and-out of the Western Bulldogs team across those 6 years.

Following the appointment of Brendan McCartney as head coach of the Western Bulldogs in November 2011, and resulting change in game play style towards winning the contested football, Dylan Addison's place in the Bulldogs's team has been ever-present during 2012.

Addison was delisted by the Western Bulldogs on 29 October 2013 after playing 88 AFL games. He subsequently joined Greater Western Sydney as a delisted free agent.

He retired in October 2015.

== Statistics ==
Legend
G	Goals	K	Kicks	D	Disposals	T	Tackles
B	Behinds	H	Handballs	M	Marks

Season	Team	No.	Games	Totals							Averages (per game)						
Season	Team	No.	Games	G	B	K	H	D	M	T	G	B	K	H	D	M	T
2006	Western Bulldogs	22	2	0	0	9	9	18	6	6	0.2	0.3	9.1	8.4	17.5	2.8	4.2
2007	Western Bulldogs	22	11	1	0	47	40	87	33	32	0.3	0.4	9.4	10.5	19.9	2.8	4.4
2008	Western Bulldogs	22	17	2	3	105	128	233	73	40	0.2	0.3	8.8	13.1	21.9	1.9	6.6
2009	Western Bulldogs	22	12	4	1	68	73	141	40	27	0.3	0.1	5.7	6.1	11.8	3.3	2.3
2010	Western Bulldogs	22	13	4	3	85	68	153	54	23	0.3	0.2	6.5	5.2	11.8	4.2	1.8
2011	Western Bulldogs	22	4	0	1	23	32	55	12	13	0.0	0.3	5.8	8.0	13.8	3.0	3.3
2012	Western Bulldogs	22	17	7	5	129	103	232	81	40	0.4	0.3	7.6	6.1	13.6	4.8	2.4
2013	Western Bulldogs	22	12	12	11	62	60	122	44	28	1.0	0.9	5.2	5.0	10.2	3.7	2.3
2014	Greater Western Sydney	46	5	0	2	26	24	50	20	14	0.0	0.4	5.2	4.8	10.0	4.0	2.8
2015	Greater Western Sydney	46	0	—	—	—	—	—	—	—	—	—	—	—	—	—	—
Career			93	30	26	554	537	1091	363	223	0.3	0.3	6.0	5.8	11.7	3.9	2.4
