= Ryan Harwood =

Australian rules footballer

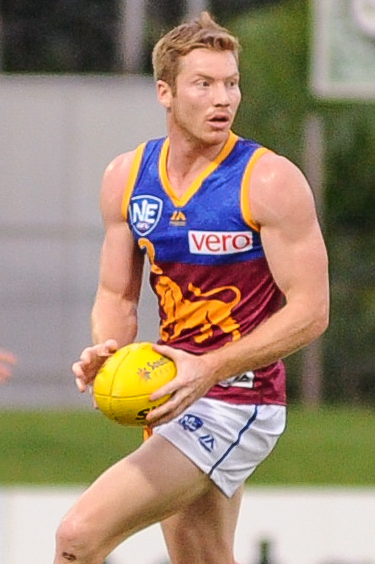
- Harwood in April 2017

Personal information
- Full name: Ryan Harwood
- Nickname: Harzy
- Born: 7 August 1991 (age 35)
- Original team: Glenorchy (TFL)
- Draft: No. 47, 2009 national draft
- Height: 184 cm (6 ft 0 in)
- Weight: 87 kg (192 lb)
- Position: Defence / midfield

Playing career^{1}
Years	Club	Games (Goals)
2010–2017	Brisbane Lions	81 (6)
- ^{1} Playing statistics correct to the end of 2017.

Ryan Harwood (born 7 August 1991) is a former professional Australian rules footballer who played for the Brisbane Lions in the Australian Football League (AFL).

== Early life ==
Harwood played for Glenorchy Football Club in his junior years. In 2009 he played for the Tassie Mariners at the 2009 AFL Under 18 Championships, where he recorded the most clearances of any player, showing promise as an inside midfielder. At the 2009 AFL Draft Camp, he recorded one of the best scores in the new kicking test, devised by Nathan Buckley, and he was then selected with the Brisbane Lions' second selection (pick 47 overall) in the 2009 National draft.

== AFL career ==
=== Early career (2010–2011) ===
In 2010 Harwood started his career playing for Brisbane's reserves team in the NEAFL. He injured his ankle in his first game for the reserves, but returned to the side in Round 3. He consistently played well throughout the season, and was rewarded when, in round 17, he made his debut against Geelong. He picked up 18 possessions and cemented his place in Brisbane's midfield, playing in the AFL for the final six games of the season.

Harwood was unable to maintain his spot in the AFL side in 2011, and was instead rotated through a few different positions while playing in the NEAFL. He only played seven AFL games for the season, just one more than in his debut season, but he still signed a two-year contract extension at the end of the season.

=== Move to the backline (2012–2014) ===
Harwood continued to struggle to stay in Brisbane's AFL side, only managing to play four of the first ten matches in 2012, still being rotated through different positions. He finally found his place as a running defender and made his way back into the AFL side, stringing together twelve consecutive matches at the end of the season, including one of the performances of his career against Melbourne, when he had 29 possessions and took 12 marks.

In spite of his good form in 2012, Harwood was again dropped from the AFL side at the beginning of 2013. Though he only played one AFL game in the first nine rounds of the season, he pushed through and once again established himself as part of the senior side, playing twelve of the final thirteen games. In round 21 he had his best match for the season, collecting 27 possessions against Greater Western Sydney.

In 2014 Harwood faced more setbacks as he had to adjust to a new coach and game plan. He struggled to get into the team early in the season, but went on to play twelve matches in a row before he had another ankle injury against Geelong. He played 14 games for the season and had the best year of his career, averaging 18.5 disposals per game and finishing equal 14th in the club champion voting.

=== Injury woes (2015–2017) ===
During the 2015 pre-season, Harwood needed surgery to address abdominal and groin pain, then spent the first part of the season playing in the NEAFL trying to regain match fitness. He made his return to the AFL in round 9 against St Kilda, but received a heavy knock and had to be subbed out of the game with concussion. He spent most of the rest of the season sidelined with more injuries, only managing to play in three AFL games, the least of his career.

Harwood returned to form and fitness in 2016 and played in the first thirteen games in a row, the longest streak of his career. Unfortunately, he was injured again and moved to Brisbane's long-term injury list when scans showed he had ruptured his posterior cruciate ligament.

In 2017 Harwood struggled again, only playing nine matches for the season. He was delisted at the conclusion of the 2017 season, but remains a free agent and can be signed by other AFL clubs.

== Statistics ==
Statistics are correct to the end of the 2017 season

Legend
G	Goals	K	Kicks	D	Disposals	T	Tackles
B	Behinds	H	Handballs	M	Marks

Season	Team	No.	Games	Totals							Averages (per game)						
Season	Team	No.	Games	G	B	K	H	D	M	T	G	B	K	H	D	M	T
2010	Brisbane Lions	26	6	3	0	27	60	87	15	22	0.5	0.0	4.5	10.0	14.5	2.5	3.7
2011	Brisbane Lions	26	7	1	1	41	56	97	15	25	0.1	0.1	5.9	8.0	13.9	2.1	3.6
2012	Brisbane Lions	2	16	0	2	131	112	243	60	36	0.0	0.1	8.2	7.0	15.2	3.8	2.3
2013	Brisbane Lions	2	13	0	0	116	93	209	49	39	0.0	0.0	8.9	7.2	16.1	3.8	3.0
2014	Brisbane Lions	2	14	2	2	143	117	260	58	43	0.1	0.1	10.2	8.4	18.6	4.1	3.1
2015	Brisbane Lions	2	3	0	1	22	12	34	8	7	0.0	0.3	7.3	4.0	11.3	2.7	2.3
2016	Brisbane Lions	2	13	0	1	96	85	181	41	35	0.0	0.1	7.4	6.5	13.9	3.2	2.7
2017	Brisbane Lions	2	9	0	0	48	64	112	34	25	0.0	0.0	5.3	7.1	12.4	3.8	2.8
Career			81	6	7	624	599	1223	280	232	0.1	0.1	7.7	7.4	15.1	3.5	2.9
