= Josh Dyson =

Australian rules football player

Personal information
- Full name: Josh Dyson
- Born: 12 August 1991 (age 35)
- Original team: Eastern Ranges (TAC Cup)
- Draft: No. 32, 2010 Rookie Draft, Brisbane Lions
- Height: 181 cm (5 ft 11 in)
- Weight: 71 kg (157 lb)
- Position: Midfielder

Playing career^{1}
Years	Club	Games (Goals)
2010–2012	Brisbane Lions	1 (0)
- ^{1} Playing statistics correct to the end of 2012.

Career highlights
- NEAFL premiership player: 2012

Josh Dyson was an Australian rules football player who played one game for the Brisbane Lions in the Australian Football League (AFL).

He was selected at pick #32 in the 2010 Rookie Draft from the Eastern Ranges in the TAC Cup. Dyson made his debut in Round 20 of the 2011 season against Adelaide. He retained on the Lions' rookie list for the 2012 season, but was delisted at the end of the season without playing another game in the AFL.
