= Brent Staker =

Australian rules footballer, born 1984

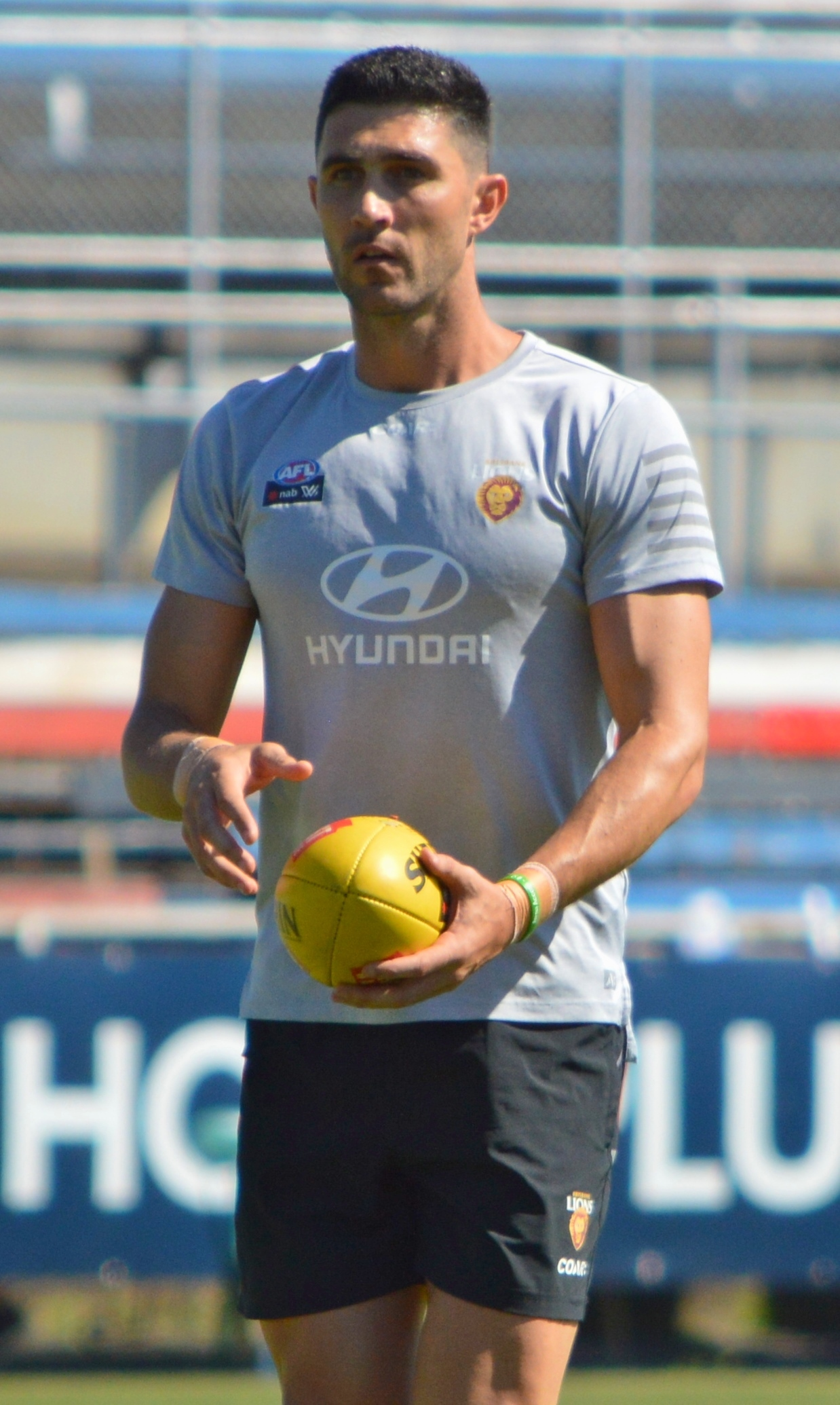
- Staker in March 2017

Personal information
- Full name: Brent Allen Staker
- Nickname: Stakes
- Born: 23 May 1984 (age 42); Broken Hill, NSW
- Original team: West Broken Hill
- Draft: #37, 2002 National Draft, West Coast
- Height: 196 cm (6 ft 5 in)
- Weight: 100 kg (220 lb)
- Position: Utility

Club information
- Current club: Brisbane Lions (women's forward coach)

Playing career^{1}
Years	Club	Games (Goals)
2003–2009	West Coast	110 (84)
2010–2015	Brisbane Lions	50 (35)
Total		160 (119)
- ^{1} Playing statistics correct to the end of 2015.

Career highlights
- 2004 AFL Rising Star nominee

Brent Allen Staker (born 23 May 1984) is a former professional Australian rules footballer who played for the West Coast Eagles and Brisbane Lions in the Australian Football League (AFL).

== Early life ==
Staker grew up in Broken Hill in remote country New South Wales. He went to Burke Ward Public School, where he made a time capsule to be opened on 2020. He made his A Grade debut in 2000 at age 16 for West Broken Hill, playing in their losing grand final side that year before joining the NSW/ACT Rams.

== AFL career ==
=== West Coast ===
Recruited from NSW/ACT Rams (Under 18s), he made his debut in 2003.

In round seven 2004, he earned an AFL Rising Star nomination when he kicked three goals against Melbourne.

==== Barry Hall incident ====
In Round 4, 2008, Brent Staker was punched in the face by Sydney Swans full-forward Barry Hall. Video footage from the incident indicated that contact was made with a punch to the jaw. Staker took no further part in the game, remaining off the field for the duration of the game. Hall's punch was graded by the Match Review Panel as intentional, severe impact and high contact, and Hall was referred to the tribunal and suspended for seven games, one of the most severe punishments in the modern era by the AFL Tribunal. Due to the severity of the strike, video footage of the incident was shown on television as far abroad as Denmark and the United States on the ESPN network.

=== Brisbane ===
At the end of the 2009 season, Staker told the Eagles that he wished to be traded away from Western Australia; accordingly, the Eagles traded him to the Brisbane Lions with its third-round draft pick (#39 overall) for Bradd Dalziell.

In August 2015, he announced his retirement from the AFL, effective at the end of the 2015 season. Prior to what would have been his final match, he injured his hamstring in the warm-up and was a late withdrawal.

== Statistics ==
Legend
G	Goals	K	Kicks	D	Disposals	T	Tackles
B	Behinds	H	Handballs	M	Marks

Season	Team	No.	Games	Totals							Averages (per game)						
Season	Team	No.	Games	G	B	K	H	D	M	T	G	B	K	H	D	M	T
2003	West Coast	41	7	3	3	29	23	52	15	13	0.4	0.4	4.1	3.3	7.4	2.1	1.9
2004	West Coast	41	17	6	11	92	61	153	70	25	0.4	0.6	5.4	3.6	9.0	4.1	1.5
2005	West Coast	41	22	13	7	174	86	260	97	22	0.6	0.3	7.9	3.9	11.8	4.4	1.0
2006	West Coast	41	23	24	15	169	103	272	113	41	1.0	0.7	7.3	4.5	11.8	4.9	1.8
2007	West Coast	41	21	20	17	179	107	286	100	36	1.0	0.8	8.5	5.1	13.6	4.8	1.7
2008	West Coast	41	14	13	8	124	78	202	58	39	0.9	0.6	8.9	5.6	14.4	4.1	2.8
2009	West Coast	41	6	5	2	41	26	67	16	18	0.8	0.3	6.8	4.3	11.2	2.7	3.0
2010	Brisbane Lions	14	22	10	15	233	146	379	126	55	0.5	0.7	10.6	6.6	17.2	5.7	2.5
2011	Brisbane Lions	14	7	4	2	49	42	91	24	13	0.6	0.3	7.0	6.0	13.0	3.4	1.9
2012	Brisbane Lions	14	0	—	—	—	—	—	—	—	—	—	—	—	—	—	—
2013	Brisbane Lions	14	15	21	7	133	59	192	69	29	1.4	0.5	8.9	3.9	12.8	4.6	1.9
2014	Brisbane Lions	14	0	—	—	—	—	—	—	—	—	—	—	—	—	—	—
2015	Brisbane Lions	14	6	0	6	29	18	47	17	12	0.0	1.0	4.8	3.0	7.8	2.8	2.0
Career			160	119	93	1252	749	2001	705	303	0.7	0.6	7.8	4.7	12.5	4.4	1.9

== Personal life ==
Staker's partner is cook and television presenter Justine Schofield. They have one son, born in September 2022.
