= Joel Patfull =

Australian rules footballer

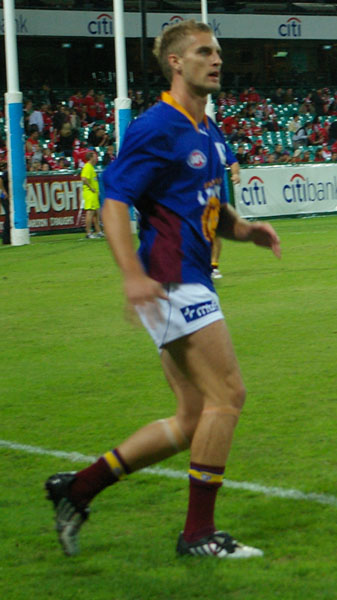
- Patfull warming up for Brisbane in 2010

Personal information
- Full name: Joel Patfull
- Born: 7 December 1984 (age 41)
- Original team: Norwood (SANFL)
- Draft: No. 14, 2003 rookie draft No. 56, 2005 national draft No. 32, 2017 rookie draft
- Height: 190 cm (6 ft 3 in)
- Weight: 88 kg (194 lb)
- Position: Defender

Playing career^{1}
Years	Club	Games (Goals)
2003–2004	Port Adelaide	0 (0)
2006–2014	Brisbane Lions	182 (24)
2015–2017	Greater Western Sydney	38 (2)
Total		220 (26)

International team honours^{2}
Years	Team	Games (Goals)
2011	Australia	1 (0)
- ^{1} Playing statistics correct to the end of 2016.^{2} Representative statistics correct as of 2011.

Career highlights
- 2× Merrett–Murray Medal: 2012, 2013

Joel Patfull (born 7 December 1984) is a former professional Australian rules footballer who played for the Brisbane Lions and the Greater Western Sydney Giants in the Australian Football League (AFL). He was also listed with the Port Adelaide Football Club from 2003 to 2004, but he did not play a senior match.

== Early life ==
After playing his junior football at the Payneham Norwood Union Football Club and then the Norwood Football Club Patfull was recruited onto the Port Adelaide rookie list in 2003, but was dropped at the end of the 2004 season. He was then recruited to the Brisbane Lions as the number 56 draft pick in the 2005 AFL draft.

== Playing career ==
He made his senior debut for the Brisbane Lions in round 8, 2006 against his former club, Port Adelaide where he scored a goal with his first kick of AFL football. He went on to play the remaining 15 games of the 2006 season.

After the 2006 AFL season, it was speculated in the media that Patfull was enticed to return to Adelaide by the Adelaide Crows and the Port Adelaide Power, however his manager announced in mid-November that Patfull had accepted a two-year contract to continue his career with the Brisbane Lions. While not a flashy player, Patfull's discipline and work ethic have made him a respected player amongst Brisbane supporters.

In 2012 he was awarded the Brisbane Lions Club Champion award (Merrett–Murray Medal) with 34 votes. He was also awarded the Shaun Hart Most Courageous Player for 2012.

In 2014, at the conclusion of the season, Patfull was traded to the Greater Western Sydney Football Club in exchange for pick 21 in the draft.

At the conclusion of the 2016 season, Patfull announced his retirement from the AFL, but he remained on the Giants' playing list as a rookie-listed player for the 2017 season.

== Statistics ==
Statistics are correct to the end of the 2016 season

Legend
G	Goals	K	Kicks	D	Disposals	T	Tackles
B	Behinds	H	Handballs	M	Marks

Season	Team	No.	Games	Totals							Averages (per game)						
Season	Team	No.	Games	G	B	K	H	D	M	T	G	B	K	H	D	M	T
2003	Port Adelaide	—	0	—	—	—	—	—	—	—	—	—	—	—	—	—	—
2004	Port Adelaide	—	0	—	—	—	—	—	—	—	—	—	—	—	—	—	—
2006	Brisbane Lions	24	15	3	9	68	61	129	43	38	0.2	0.6	4.5	4.1	8.6	2.9	2.5
2007	Brisbane Lions	24	21	13	8	110	83	193	73	46	0.6	0.4	5.2	4.0	9.2	3.5	2.2
2008	Brisbane Lions	24	22	3	4	119	119	238	79	43	0.1	0.2	5.4	5.4	10.8	3.6	2.0
2009	Brisbane Lions	24	20	0	0	131	128	259	85	41	0.0	0.0	6.6	6.4	13.0	4.3	2.1
2010	Brisbane Lions	24	21	2	2	110	112	222	61	82	0.1	0.1	5.2	5.3	10.6	2.9	3.9
2011	Brisbane Lions	24	18	0	0	87	76	163	59	33	0.0	0.0	4.8	4.2	9.1	3.3	1.8
2012	Brisbane Lions	24	22	0	0	143	113	256	88	63	0.0	0.0	6.5	5.1	11.6	4.0	2.9
2013	Brisbane Lions	24	22	1	0	178	128	306	114	50	0.0	0.0	8.1	5.8	13.9	5.2	2.3
2014	Brisbane Lions	24	21	2	1	151	154	305	108	48	0.1	0.0	7.2	7.3	14.5	5.1	2.3
2015	Greater Western Sydney	24	16	1	2	100	88	188	71	34	0.1	0.1	6.3	5.5	11.8	4.4	2.1
2016	Greater Western Sydney	24	22	1	0	125	100	225	84	59	0.0	0.0	5.7	4.5	10.2	3.8	2.7
2017	Greater Western Sydney	—	0	—	—	—	—	—	—	—	—	—	—	—	—	—	—
Career			220	26	26	1322	1162	2484	865	537	0.1	0.1	6.0	5.3	11.3	3.9	2.4
