= Merrett–Murray Medal =

Annual award in Australian football

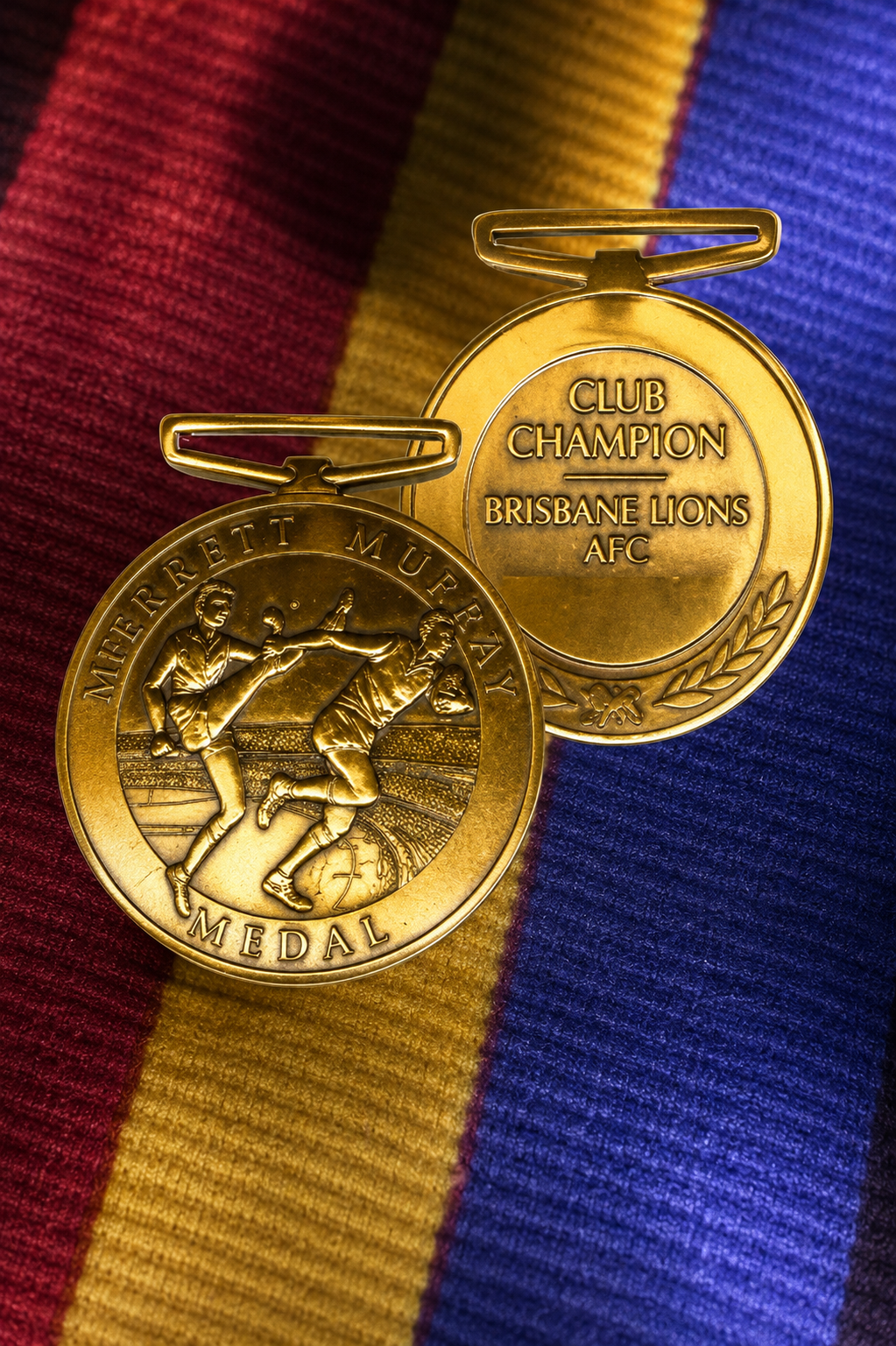

The Merrett–Murray Medal has been awarded annually since 1997, to the player adjudged the Brisbane Lions club champion over the immediately preceding Australian Football League (AFL) season. It is named after Roger Merrett and Kevin Murray. Merrett was a champion at the Brisbane Bears, while Murray was a legend at the Fitzroy Lions, the two clubs which merged to form the Brisbane Lions. The voting system, as of the 2017 AFL season, consists of the senior coach and assistant coaches scoring players based on their overall performance, influence on the game, team contribution and compliance with team values. The most votes a player can receive in a single game is twelve.

== Recipients ==
^	Denotes current player
+	Player won Brownlow Medal in same season

Season	Recipient(s)	Ref.
1997	Matthew Clarke	
1998	Chris Scott	
1999	Jason Akermanis	
1999	Justin Leppitsch	
2000	Michael Voss	
2001	Simon Black	
2001	Michael Voss (2)	
2002	Simon Black+ (2)	
2003	Michael Voss (3)	
2004	Nigel Lappin	
2005	Jason Akermanis (2)	
2006	Simon Black (3)	
2007	Jonathan Brown	
2008	Jonathan Brown (2)	
2009	Jonathan Brown (3)	
2010	Michael Rischitelli	
2011	Tom Rockliff	
2012	Joel Patfull	
2013	Joel Patfull (2)	
2014	Tom Rockliff (2)	
2015	Dayne Beams	
2015	Stefan Martin	
2015	Mitch Robinson	
2015	Dayne Zorko^	
2016	Dayne Zorko^ (2)	
2017	Dayne Zorko^ (3)	
2018	Dayne Zorko^ (4)	
2019	Lachie Neale	
2020	Lachie Neale+ (2)	
2021	Dayne Zorko^ (5)	
2022	Lachie Neale (3)	
2023	Harris Andrews^	
2024	Lachie Neale (4)	
2025	Josh Dunkley^	
2026	Will Ashcroft^	

== Multiple winners ==
^	Denotes current player

Player	Medals	Seasons
Dayne Zorko^	5	2015, 2016, 2017, 2018, 2021
Lachie Neale	4	2019, 2020, 2022, 2024
Simon Black	3	2001, 2002, 2006
Jonathan Brown	3	2007, 2008, 2009
Michael Voss	3	2000, 2001, 2003
Jason Akermanis	2	1999, 2005
Joel Patfull	2	2012, 2013
Tom Rockliff	2	2011, 2014

== See also ==
- Mitchell Medal – for list of Fitzroy best and fairest winners from 1884–1996
- Brisbane Bears Club Champion – for list of Brisbane Bears best and fairest winners from 1987–1996
