= Matt Maguire =

Australian rules footballer, born 1984

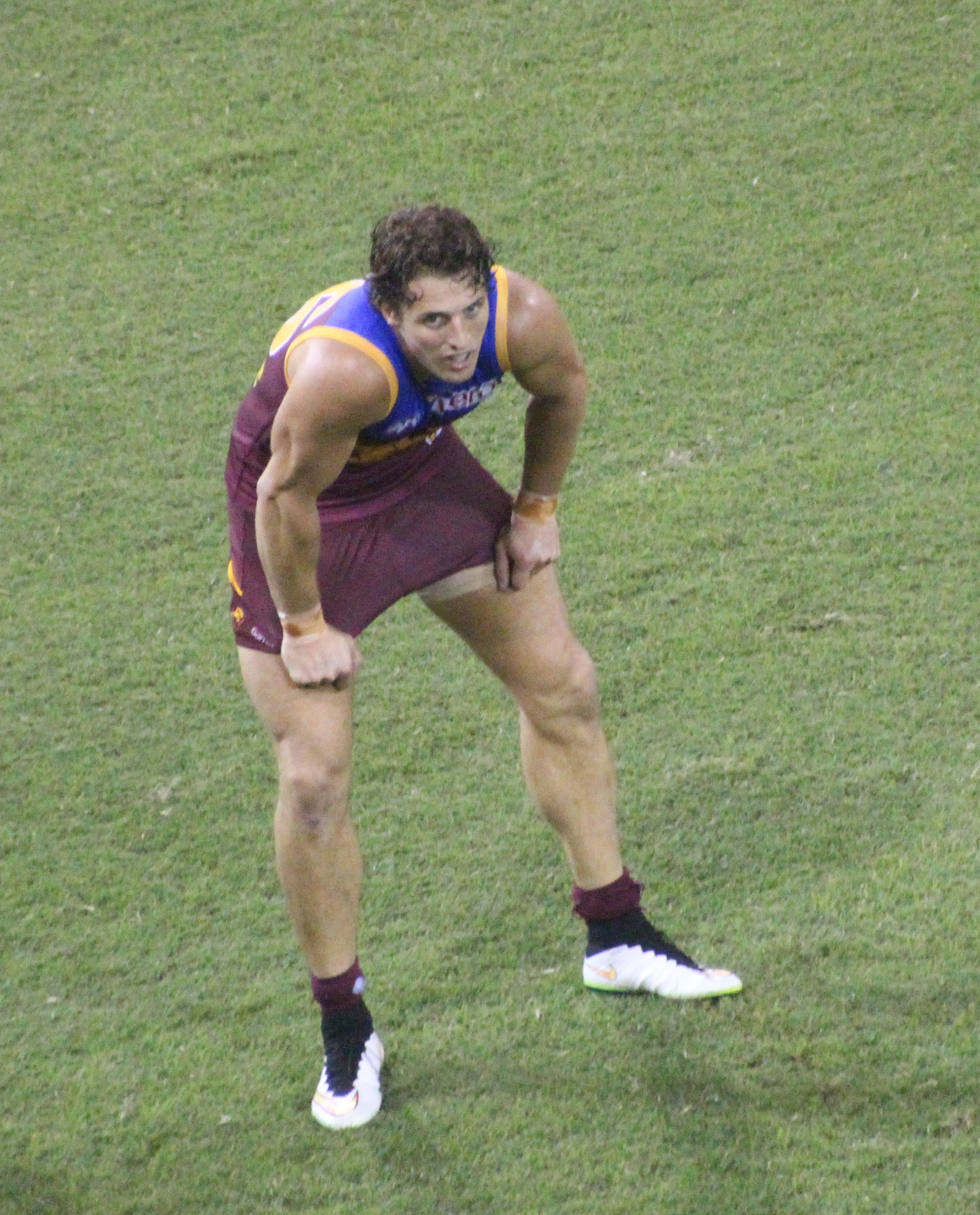
- Maguire in a game for the Lions against Richmond in his final AFL game in April 2015

Personal information
- Full name: Matthew John Maguire
- Nickname: Goose
- Born: 30 May 1984 (age 42)
- Original team: Geelong Falcons (TAC Cup)
- Draft: No. 21, 2001 National Draft, St Kilda; No. 91, 2009 National Draft, Brisbane Lions
- Height: 192 cm (6 ft 4 in)
- Weight: 100 kg (220 lb)
- Position: Defender / Forward

Playing career^{1}
Years	Club	Games (Goals)
2002–2009	St Kilda	99 (19)
2010–2015	Brisbane Lions	71 (2)
Total		170 (21)
- ^{1} Playing statistics correct to the end of 2015.

Career highlights
- Pre Season Premiership 2004

Matthew John Maguire (born 30 May 1984) is a former professional Australian rules footballer who played with the St Kilda Football Club and the Brisbane Lions in the Australian Football League (AFL).

== AFL career ==
=== St Kilda Football Club ===
Maguire played in St Kilda's 2004 Wizard Home Loans Cup winning side, the club's second pre-season cup win.

In 2006 a serious leg injury halted his season. During the final moments of the St Kilda vs West Coast Eagles game in Round 18, Maguire collided with Tyson Stenglein causing a break to both his tibia and fibula. His injury was likened to that of Richmond's Nathan Brown, but it was soon revealed to be less severe. In the days following the incident, Maguire had a rod inserted into his leg and the club was optimistic he could make his comeback (without any complications) as soon as Round 1, 2007. But soon after Maguire was diagnosed with Compartment syndrome and required a further eight operations to relieve him of the pain and swelling. He suffered complications with compartment syndrome in his calf and spent 21 days in hospital. Doctors had to cut into his calf numerous times to clear the build-up of blood, with ever-increasing difficulty in repairing the wound.

Maguire made his return to the AFL in Round 1 of the 2007 season only to be further sidelined with stress fractures in his foot. He returned once again in the Saints' Round 14 loss against Collingwood and although he played out the remainder of the year it was clear that he was a shadow of his former self. At the end of the 2007 season it was revealed that after experiencing soreness during training he had once again suffered stress fractures in his foot, preventing him from participating in the majority of the Saints' pre-season.

After finally returning in Round 4 in 2008, Maguire suffered another injury in Round 7 in a St Kilda vs Richmond game. Once again he injured his left foot and this effectively sidelined him until the end of the 2008 AFL season. He had surgery to repair a fracture to the fourth metatarsal, one of the long bones that connects the middle of the foot to the base of the toes.

The St Kilda football manager, Matthew Drain, said that although Maguire most likely would not return in 2009 this may be the best chance of him getting everything right without the pressure of playing and may turn out to be the best thing for him in the long run.

Maguire spent most of the 2009 season playing for St Kilda's VFL affiliate the Sandringham Zebras.

As of the end of the 2009 season Maguire had played in four AFL finals and one pre-season cup final.

Maguire was delisted from the St Kilda playing list on 29 October 2009.

=== Brisbane Lions ===
On 26 November 2009 the Brisbane Lions selected Maguire in the draft at pick number 91. He was given jumper number 36 which was previously worn by Daniel Bradshaw. Maguire played his 100th AFL game in Round 1 of the 2010 season for the Brisbane Lions against the West Coast Eagles.

Maguire retired on 23 June 2015 after ongoing effects of a concussion he suffered in a NEAFL game two months prior.

== Statistics ==
Legend
G	Goals	K	Kicks	D	Disposals	T	Tackles
B	Behinds	H	Handballs	M	Marks

Season	Team	No.	Games	Totals							Averages (per game)						
Season	Team	No.	Games	G	B	K	H	D	M	T	G	B	K	H	D	M	T
2002	St Kilda	31	12	2	1	56	20	76	29	12	0.2	0.1	4.7	1.7	6.3	2.4	1.0
2003	St Kilda	31	17	6	6	90	44	134	46	40	0.4	0.4	5.3	2.6	7.9	2.7	2.4
2004	St Kilda	31	17	1	0	136	60	196	71	30	0.1	0.0	8.0	3.5	11.5	4.2	1.8
2005	St Kilda	31	21	6	6	188	88	276	99	22	0.3	0.3	9.0	4.2	13.1	4.7	1.1
2006	St Kilda	31	18	4	3	166	79	245	92	45	0.2	0.3	9.2	4.4	13.6	5.1	2.5
2007	St Kilda	31	10	0	1	63	45	108	39	18	0.0	0.2	6.3	4.5	10.8	3.9	1.8
2008	St Kilda	31	4	0	0	19	15	34	10	4	0.0	0.0	4.8	3.8	8.5	2.5	1.0
2009	St Kilda	31	0	—	—	—	—	—	—	—	—	—	—	—	—	—	—
2010	Brisbane Lions	36	14	0	1	137	85	222	86	40	0.0	0.1	9.8	6.1	15.9	6.1	2.9
2011	Brisbane Lions	36	15	0	2	94	76	170	59	32	0.0	0.1	6.3	5.1	11.3	3.9	2.1
2012	Brisbane Lions	36	16	0	0	147	59	206	81	34	0.0	0.0	9.2	3.7	12.9	5.1	2.1
2013	Brisbane Lions	36	11	1	2	114	46	160	71	18	0.1	0.2	10.4	4.2	14.6	6.5	1.6
2014	Brisbane Lions	36	13	1	1	121	59	180	65	21	0.1	0.1	9.3	4.5	13.9	5.0	1.6
2015	Brisbane Lions	36	2	0	0	12	5	17	4	7	0.1	0.0	6.0	2.5	8.5	2.0	3.5
Career			170	21	23	1343	681	2024	752	323	0.1	0.1	7.9	4.0	11.9	4.4	1.9
