= Lachie Henderson =

Australian rules footballer

Lachlan Henderson
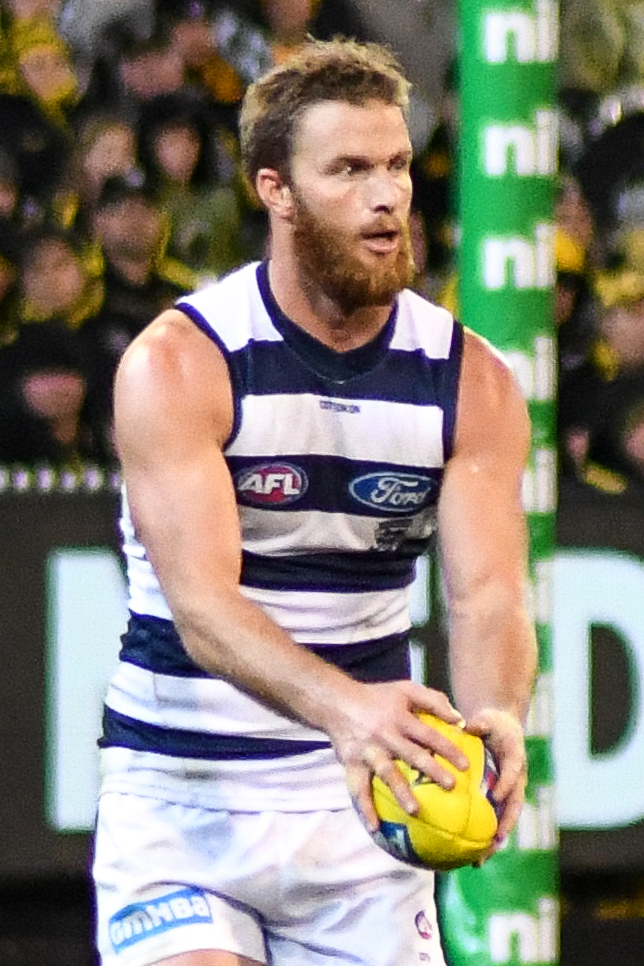
- Henderson playing for Geelong in August 2018

Personal information
- Full name: Lachlan Stuart Henderson
- Born: 14 December 1989 (age 36); Trentham, Goulburn
- Original team: Geelong Falcons (TAC Cup)
- Draft: No. 8, 2007 National Draft, Brisbane Lions
- Height: 196 cm (6 ft 5 in)
- Weight: 95 kg (209 lb)
- Position: Forward / Back

Playing career
Years	Club	Games (Goals)
2008–2009	Brisbane Lions	15 (3)
2010–2015	Carlton	102 (101)
2016–2021	Geelong	89 (13)
Total		206 (117)

Lachlan Stuart Henderson (born 14 December 1989) is a former Australian rules footballer, who played for the Brisbane Lions, the Carlton Football Club and the Geelong Football Club in the Australian Football League (AFL).

== Junior career ==
Henderson played his junior football in Birregurra, Victoria, before entering the AIS-AFL Academy, from which he graduated in 2007, the same year he completed his schooling at The Geelong College. He played TAC Cup football for the Geelong Falcons. Henderson was drafted by the Brisbane Lions with a first-round selection in the 2007 AFL draft (No. 8 overall).

== AFL career ==
=== Brisbane ===
A genuine key position prospect, Henderson was trialed at various key positions in his debut season including forward, defensive and ruck roles. He played a total of fifteen senior matches for the Lions in 2008 and 2009.

=== Carlton ===
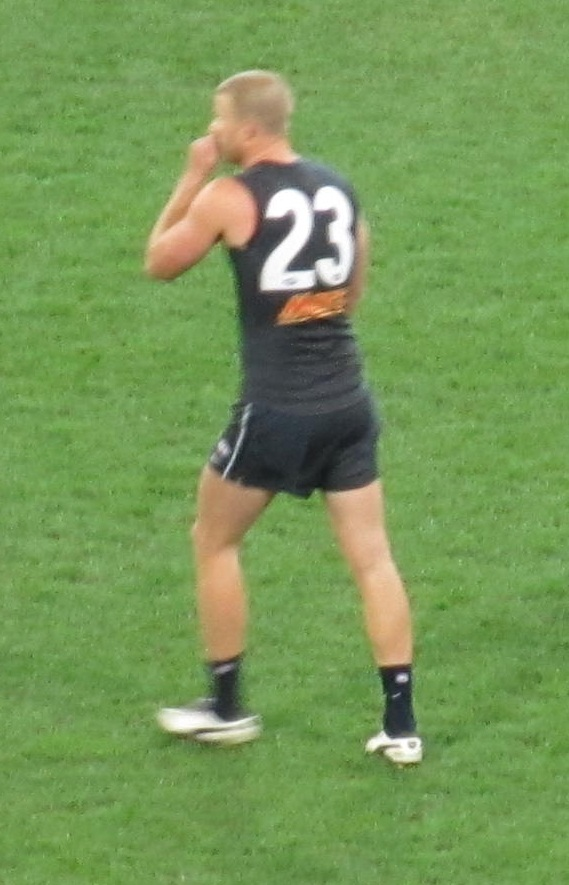
Henderson playing for Carlton against St Kilda, 2011.

At the end of 2009, Henderson was traded to the Carlton Football Club. Brisbane exchanged Henderson and its first-round draft pick (No. 12 overall) for a second-round draft pick (No. 27 overall) and star full forward Brendan Fevola, who was being traded away from Carlton for disciplinary reasons. Henderson made his debut for Carlton in Round 1, 2010 against Richmond, and he kicked three goals in the Blues' second-round game against his old team. Throughout his first season for Carlton, Henderson played nineteen matches, and was played primarily at centre-half forward; but through the first half of 2011, Henderson struggled to gain regular selection as a forward.

In mid-2011, Henderson was moved to full-back – mostly out of necessity, as the Carlton defence was hit with a number of injuries at the time. However, Henderson was sufficiently impressive in the role that he held his place as a key defender, either full-back or centre half-back, for the rest of the season.

In a 2012 interview, Henderson cited his career highlight as "...last year’s Elimination Final – my first winning-final for Carlton".

During the 2012 AFL home and away season Henderson played the early parts of the season in the backline with injuries hindering his performance. During the midpoint of the season Henderson opted to have surgery to fix a groin injury.

Under new coach Mick Malthouse coming in to replace former coach Brett Ratten for the 2013 AFL Home and Away season, Henderson started the season as a backman and showed promising signs, keeping the West Coast Eagles' Josh Kennedy goalless in Round 4.

At the end of the 2013 Toyota AFL season, Henderson finished 3rd in Carlton's best in fairest (John Nicholls Medal), after winner Kade Simpson and Andrew Walker.

In the 2014 Home and Away season, Henderson proved to be utilised as a forward where though his season was derailed by an injury during the last 6 weeks kicking 28 goals in 17 matches proved to be his best goal to game ratio along with 5.2 marks a game.

In August 2015, Henderson requested a trade from the club at the end of the season, he expressed his desire to play the remaining three matches of the season, but was ruled out by Carlton due to his desire to leave the club. In October, Henderson was traded to the Geelong Football Club.

=== Geelong ===
Henderson become a consistent part of Geelong's defence, however from 2019 he struggled to play at the AFL level. After 54 games for Geelong, he was delisted at the end of 2019. However he received a reprieve, after being selected with pick #35 in the rookie draft.

He announced his retirement at the end of 2021.
