= Lindsay Gilbee =

Australian rules footballer, born 1981

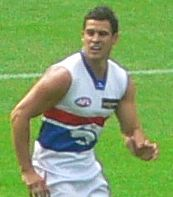

Personal information
- Full name: Lindsay Gilbee
- Born: 8 July 1981 (age 45)
- Original team: Eastern Ranges (TAC Cup)
- Draft: No. 43, 1999 national draft
- Height: 180 cm (5 ft 11 in)
- Weight: 82 kg (181 lb)
- Position: Defender

Playing career^{1}
| Years | Club | Games (Goals) |
| 2001–2012 | Western Bulldogs | 206 (119) |

International team honours
| Years | Team | Games (Goals) |
| 2005–2006 | Australia | 4 |
- ^{1} Playing statistics correct to the end of 2011.

Lindsay Gilbee (born 8 July 1981) is a former Australian rules footballer who played for the Western Bulldogs in the Australian Football League (AFL). He was selected by the Bulldogs in the 3rd round of the 1999 National AFL Draft with pick 43 after playing for the Eastern Ranges in the TAC Cup. He retired after the 2012 season. Gilbee currently serves as a development coach at the St Kilda Football Club.

Known as one of the best kicks in the AFL, Gilbee rejected offers to trial in the United States to become an American football punter.

In 2019, Gilbee's family discovered that his maternal grandmother was an Indigenous woman from the Booandik people, who was raised in fostercare, after her mother died within weeks of childbirth.

== Statistics ==
Legend
| G | Goals | K | Kicks | D | Disposals | T | Tackles |
| B | Behinds | H | Handballs | M | Marks |

| Season | Team | No. | Games | Totals | | | | | | | Averages (per game) | | | | | | |
| Season | Team | No. | Games | G | B | K | H | D | M | T | G | B | K | H | D | M | T |
|---|---|---|---|---|---|---|---|---|---|---|---|---|---|---|---|---|---|
| 2001 | Western Bulldogs | 29 | 9 | 2 | 1 | 42 | 30 | 72 | 26 | 5 | 0.2 | 0.1 | 4.7 | 3.3 | 8.0 | 2.9 | 0.6 |
| 2002 | Western Bulldogs | 9 | 16 | 7 | 10 | 121 | 76 | 197 | 62 | 18 | 0.4 | 0.6 | 7.6 | 4.8 | 12.3 | 3.9 | 1.1 |
| 2003 | Western Bulldogs | 9 | 14 | 10 | 3 | 105 | 70 | 175 | 53 | 21 | 0.7 | 0.2 | 7.5 | 5.0 | 12.5 | 3.8 | 1.5 |
| 2004 | Western Bulldogs | 9 | 12 | 3 | 1 | 119 | 71 | 190 | 48 | 16 | 0.3 | 0.1 | 9.9 | 5.9 | 15.8 | 4.0 | 1.3 |
| 2005 | Western Bulldogs | 9 | 22 | 21 | 5 | 329 | 126 | 455 | 108 | 38 | 1.0 | 0.2 | 15.0 | 5.7 | 20.7 | 4.9 | 1.7 |
| 2006 | Western Bulldogs | 9 | 24 | 9 | 9 | 324 | 183 | 507 | 121 | 32 | 0.4 | 0.4 | 13.5 | 7.6 | 21.1 | 5.0 | 1.3 |
| 2007 | Western Bulldogs | 9 | 19 | 11 | 6 | 270 | 103 | 373 | 94 | 31 | 0.6 | 0.3 | 14.2 | 5.4 | 19.6 | 4.9 | 1.6 |
| 2008 | Western Bulldogs | 9 | 24 | 14 | 8 | 352 | 157 | 509 | 112 | 24 | 0.6 | 0.3 | 14.7 | 6.5 | 21.2 | 4.7 | 1.0 |
| 2009 | Western Bulldogs | 9 | 24 | 24 | 12 | 340 | 169 | 509 | 113 | 45 | 1.0 | 0.5 | 14.2 | 7.0 | 21.2 | 4.7 | 1.9 |
| 2010 | Western Bulldogs | 9 | 25 | 7 | 9 | 352 | 171 | 523 | 139 | 48 | 0.3 | 0.4 | 14.1 | 6.8 | 20.9 | 5.6 | 1.9 |
| 2011 | Western Bulldogs | 9 | 13 | 10 | 2 | 130 | 70 | 200 | 50 | 30 | 0.8 | 0.2 | 10.0 | 5.4 | 15.4 | 3.8 | 2.3 |
| 2012 | Western Bulldogs | 9 | 4 | 1 | 0 | 41 | 31 | 72 | 19 | 3 | 0.3 | 0.0 | 10.3 | 7.8 | 18.0 | 4.8 | 0.8 |
| Career | | | 206 | 119 | 66 | 2525 | 1257 | 3782 | 945 | 311 | 0.6 | 0.3 | 12.3 | 6.1 | 18.4 | 4.6 | 1.5 |
