= 2011 Brisbane Lions season =

Coordinates: 27°29′9″S 153°2′17″E

Brisbane Lions
2011 season
- President: Angus Johnson
- Coach: Michael Voss
- Captain: Jonathan Brown
- Home ground: The Gabba
- NAB Cup: Round 1
- AFL season: 15th
- Finals Series: Did not qualify
- Best and Fairest: Tom Rockliff (37.5)
- Leading goalkicker: Mitch Clark (27)
- Highest home attendance: 24,921 (Round 8 v Essendon)
- Lowest home attendance: 17,276 (Round 15 v Port Adelaide)
- Average home attendance: 21,119

The 2011 season was the Brisbane Lions' 15th season in the Australian Football League. The team is based in Brisbane, Queensland.The club also participated in the pre-season NAB Cup and, after getting knocked out in the first round, the NAB Challenge.

The club finished 15th in the regular season, recording only 4 wins, their worst result since 1998.

== 2011 Playing List ==
Senior List
No.	Player	Hgt	Wgt	Date of birth	Age in 2011	Debut	Recruited from	2011 Games	2011 Goals	Career Games	Career Goals
1	(Western Australia) Mitch Clark	198	95	19 October 1987	24	2006	East Fremantle	0	0	65	34
3	(Victoria (state)) Sam Sheldon	183	80	8 March 1989	22	2009	Hailebury College / Oakleigh U18	0	0	24	1
4	(South Australia) Jared Polec	189	80	12 October 1992	19	****	Woodville-West Torrens	0	0	0	0
6	(Victoria (state)) Luke Power	179	78	8 January 1980	31	1998	Balwyn / Oakleigh U18	0	0	262	207
7	(Victoria (state)) Jed Adcock	184	85	15 November 1985	26	2004	Maryborough / North Ballarat U18	0	0	100	29
8	(Victoria (state)) Matt Austin	187	75	30 March 1989	21	2009	North Ballarat U18	0	0	11	2
9	(Western Australia) Ashley McGrath	182	81	20 May 1983	28	2001	South Fremantle	0	0	155	109
10	(Western Australia) Daniel Rich	184	83	7 June 1990	21	2009	Subiaco	0	0	46	20
11	(Republic of Ireland) Pearce Hanley	184	83	15 November 1988	23	2008	County Mayo	0	0	12	3
12	(Western Australia) James Hawksley	187	77	5 February 1989	22	2008	Peel Thunder	0	0	22	0
13	(Victoria (state)) Callum Bartlett	179	75	19 June 1991	20	****	Geelong U18	0	0	0	0
14	(New South Wales) Brent Staker	182	78	23 May 1984	27	2003	NSW/ACT Rams / West Coast	0	0	132	94
15	(Northern Territory) Xavier Clarke	182	78	28 September 1983	27	2002	St Mary's / St Kilda	0	0	106	49
16	(Victoria (state)) Jonathan Brown	195	102	29 October 1981	30	2000	Geelong U18	0	0	200	476
17	(Victoria (state)) Claye Beams	182	77	1 September 1991	20	****	Labrador	0	0	0	0
18	(Western Australia) Todd Banfield	182	75	28 June 1990	20	2010	Swan Districts	0	0	22	27
19	(Queensland) Jamie Charman	197	102	16 July 1982	29	2001	Northern Eagles	0	0	129	55
20	(Western Australia) Simon Black	186	83	3 April 1979	32	1998	East Fremantle	0	0	275	159
21	(Queensland) Daniel Merrett	196	104	12 December 1984	27	2005	Southport	0	0	103	17
22	(Tasmania) Tom Collier	192	84	25 March 1989	22	2008	Tasmanian Devils	0	0	20	2
23	(Western Australia) Matthew Leuenberger	203	98	7 June 1988	23	2007	East Perth	0	0	44	5
24	(South Australia) Joel Patfull	190	89	7 December 1984	27	2006	Norwood / Port Adelaide	0	0	99	21
26	(Tasmania) Ryan Harwood	183	81	8 July 1991	20	2010	Tasmania U18	0	0	6	3
28	(Victoria (state)) Patrick Karnezis	191	80	23 April 1992	19	****	Oakleigh Chargers	0	0	0	0
29	(Queensland) Andrew Raines	192	86	8 March 1986	25	2004	Southport / Richmond	0	0	66	1
30	(South Australia) Jack Redden	189	74	9 December 1990	21	2009	Glenelg	0	0	32	10
31	(Victoria (state)) James Polkinghorne	183	81	21 January 1989	22	2008	Calder U18	0	0	39	21
32	(Queensland) Cheynee Stiller	186	82	3 May 1986	25	2006	Northern Eagles	0	0	76	18
33	(Victoria (state)) Amon Buchanan	179	83	10 October 1982	29	2002	Geelong Falcons / Sydney	0	0	128	66
34	(South Australia) Jesse O'Brien	184	71	13 February 1991	20	2010	North Adelaide	0	0	1	0
35	(Victoria (state)) Ryan Lester	191	83	26 August 1992	19	****	Oakleigh Chargers	0	0	0	0
36	(Victoria (state)) Matt Maguire	190	94	30 May 1984	27	2002	Geelong U18 / St Kilda	0	0	113	19
37	(Queensland) Bryce Retzlaff	192	82	29 June 1991	20	****	Labrador	0	0	0	0
38	(Victoria (state)) Tom Rockliff	184	83	22 February 1990	21	2009	Murray Bushrangers U18	0	0	20	4
39	(Queensland) Josh Drummond	188	87	19 April 1983	28	2005	Northern Eagles	0	0	72	30
42	(Tasmania) Josh Green	177	76	24 August 1992	19	****	Clarence	0	0	0	0
43	(Western Australia) Rohan Bewick	184	75	10 October 1989	22	****	West Perth	0	0	0	0
44	(Tasmania) Aaron Cornelius	192	86	25 May 1990	21	2009	Tassie Mariners U18	0	0	6	9
Rookie List
No.	Player	Hgt	Wgt	Date of birth	Age in 2011	Debut	Recruited from	2011 Games	2011 Goals	Career Games	Career Goals
2	(Queensland) Albert Proud	180	83	6 September 1988	23	2007	Mount Gravatt	0	0	29	10
25	(Tasmania) Bart McCulloch	199	86	23 September 1990	20	****	South Launceston	0	0	0	0
27	(Victoria (state)) Josh Dyson	181	69	12 August 1991	20	****	Eastern Ranges U18	0	0	0	0
40	(Republic of Ireland) Niall McKeever	198	95	16 February 1989	22	****	County Antrim	0	0	0	0
41	(Victoria (state)) Mitchell Golby	183	82	3 October 1991	20	****	Gippsland Power	0	0	0	0
45	(Victoria (state)) Brad Harvey	185	83	16 April 1992	24	****	Eastern Ranges	0	0	0	0
46	(Queensland) Broc McCauley	200	101	20 December 1986	24	****	Southport	0	0	0	0

== Player changes for 2011 ==
=== In ===
Player	Previous club	League	via
(Western Australia) Rohan Bewick	West Perth	WAFL	2010 Trade Week
(South Australia) Jared Polec	Woodville-West Torrens	SANFL	2010 AFL draft – Pick #5
(Victoria (state)) Patrick Karnezis	Oakleigh Chargers	TAC Cup	2010 AFL draft – Pick #25
(Victoria (state)) Ryan Lester	Oakleigh Chargers	TAC Cup	2010 AFL draft – Pick #28
(Tasmania) Josh Green	Clarence	TFL	2010 AFL draft – Pick #32

=== Out ===
Player	New Club	League	via
(Tasmania) Justin Sherman	Western Bulldogs	AFL	2010 Trade Week
(Victoria (state)) Michael Rischitelli	Gold Coast	AFL	Uncontracted
(Northern Territory) Jared Brennan	Gold Coast	AFL	2010 Trade Week
(Victoria (state)) Troy Selwood	Unknown	Unknown	Delisted
(Victoria (state)) Travis Johnstone	Unknown	Unknown	Delisted
(Queensland) Albert Proud	Unknown	Unknown	Delisted
(Tasmania) Bart McCulloch	Unknown	Unknown	Delisted
(Queensland) Broc McCauley	Unknown	Unknown	Delisted
(Queensland) Sean Yoshiura	Unknown	Unknown	Delisted
(Victoria (state)) Brendan Fevola	Casey	VFL	Sacked

== Pre-Season Results ==
=== NAB Cup ===
==== Round 1 ====
	Pool 4
18 February 7:15pm	Essendon 1.11.1 (76)	def.	Brisbane Lions 0.2.2 (14)	Etihad Stadium	Report
18 February 8:20pm	Brisbane Lions 0.2.3 (15)	def. by	St Kilda 1.5.5 (44)	Etihad Stadium (crowd: 24,158)	Report

=== NAB Challenge ===
==== Week 1 ====
Week 1
26 February 1:00pm	Western Bulldogs	def.	Brisbane Lions	Visy Park	Report
4.3 (27); 10.5 (65); 16.7 (103); 20.8 (128)	Q1; Q2; Q3; Final	2.2 (14); 4.5 (29); 5.7 (37); 8.10 (58)
Hall 3 Higgins, Giansiracusa, Ward, Jones, Veszpremi, Moles 2 Griffen, Liberatore, Minson, Howard, Djerrkura 1	Goals	McGrath, Clark 2 Banfield, Lester, Retzlaff, Rockliff 1
Williams, Cross, Liberatore, Markovic, Higgins, Giansiracusa	Best	Rich, Banfield, Lester, McGrath, Retzlaff

==== Week 2 ====
Week 2
5 March 12:00pm	Melbourne	def. by	Brisbane Lions	Visy Park (crowd: 3,000)	Report
4.2 (26); 6.4 (40); 9.5 (59); 12.6 (78)	Q1; Q2; Q3; Final	3.4 (22); 7.8 (50); 13.9 (87); 16.11 (107)	Umpires: R Findlay, S Ryan, G Fila
Maric 3 Watts 2 Martin, Jetta, Dunn, Sylvia, Petterd, Jamar, Bate 1	Goals	Power 3 Clark, Bewick, O'Brien, Rockliff, Polkinghorne, Beams 2 Lester 1
Jetta, Sylvia, Jones, Bail, Maric, Tapscott, Jamar	Best	Rich, Clark, Adcock, Power, Rockliff, Collier, Lester

==== Week 3 ====
Week 3
13 March 3:00pm	Gold Coast	def. by	Brisbane Lions	Fankhauser Reserve (crowd: 4,053)	Report
3.2 (20); 4.4 (28); 6.9 (45); 7.12 (54)	Q1; Q2; Q3; Final	2.5 (17); 9.10 (64); 12.16 (86); 17.20 (122)	Umpires: H Kennedy, S Stewart, C Kamolins
Dixon 2 Flanagan, Fraser, Patrick, Krakouer, Matera 1	Goals	Staker 3 Clark, Rockliff 2 Power, Rich, Banfield, Black, Redden, O'Brien, Maguire, Raines, Bewick, Beams 1
Swallow, Matera, Fraser, Dixon, Tape	Best	Hanley, Staker, Rich, O'Brien, Beams, McGrath
Daye (shoulder)	Injuries	McCauley (ankle)

== Regular season ==
=== Home and Away season ===
==== Round 1 ====
Round 1
26 March 7:10pm	Brisbane Lions	def. by	Fremantle	The Gabba (crowd: 23,373)	Report
4.5 (29); 8.6 (54); 10.7 (67); 14.8 (92)	Q1; Q2; Q3; Final	3.5 (23); 6.8 (44); 8.14 (62); 13.16 (94)	Umpires: C Donlon, S Stewart, C Kamolins; Television broadcast: Fox Sports
J Brown 3 C Beams, T Banfield, D Rich 2 J Polkinghorne, J O'Brien, R Bewick, M Clark, R Lester 1	Goals	C Mayne, M Walters 2 J Pitt, D Mundy, S Hill, N Lower, N Fyfe, A Sandilands, N Suban, H Ballantyne, K Bradley 1
S Black, M Leuenberger, D Rich, T Rockliff, D Merrett, J Brown, P Hanley	Best	M Pavlich, A Sandilands, D Mundy, A McPhee, C Mayne, N Fyfe
L Power (back, replaced in selected side by Beams), J Brown (nose), B Staker (ankle)	Injuries	Nil
Nil	Reports	Nil
The Brisbane Lions lost their first home game of the season for the first time in thirteen years.

==== Round 2 ====
Round 2
3 April 1:10pm	Western Bulldogs	def.	Brisbane Lions	Etihad Stadium (crowd: 22,331)	Report
5.4 (34); 10.4 (64); 14.7 (91); 19.9 (123)	Q1; Q2; Q3; Final	0.2 (2); 3.5 (23); 4.7 (31); 6.9 (45)	Umpires: J Dalgliesh, S Meredith, S Wenn; Television broadcast: Fox Sports
B Hall, Griffen, S Higgins 3 D Giansiracusa 2, M Boyd 2 J Hill, L Jones, J Sherman, J Grant, C Ward, N Djerrkura 1	Goals	J Polkinghorne, J Redden 2 R Lester, M Clark 1
R Griffen, M Boyd, A Cooney, D Cross, T Williams, T Liberatore, J Hill	Best	S Black, A Buchanan, J Adcock, R Bewick, J Redden, D Rich, T Rockliff
Nil	Injuries	M Maguire (quad) replaced in selected side by B McCauley
Nil	Reports	Nil
Justin Sherman played against his former club for the first time.

==== Round 3 ====
Round 3
10 April 1:10pm	Melbourne	def.	Brisbane Lions	MCG (crowd: 24,380)	Report
1.1 (7); 6.3 (39); 11.7 (73); 12.10 (82)	Q1; Q2; Q3; Final	5.2 (32); 7.3 (45); 9.3 (57); 11.5 (71)	Umpires: J Schmitt, R Chamberlain, T Keating; Television broadcast: Fox Sports
L Jurrah 5 J Grimes, J Bennell, L Dunn, A Wonaeamirri, J Gysberts, C Sylvia, B Moloney 1	Goals	L Power 4 T Banfield 2 J Redden, M Leuenberger, J Polkinghorne, T Rockliff, M Clark 1
M Jamar, L Jurrah, B Moloney, J Gysberts, C Sylvia, N Jones, J Frawley	Best	M Clark, L Power, J Adcock, T Banfield, S Black, A Raines, J Polec
Nil	Injuries	M Clark (dislocated finger)
Nil	Reports	Nil
The Lions lost their first three matches of the season for the first time since 1998, the year they last won the wooden spoon.

==== Round 4 ====
Round 4
Bye; Brisbane Lions

==== Round 5 ====
Round 5
21 April 7:45pm	Brisbane Lions	def. by	St Kilda	The Gabba (crowd: 22,520)	Report
4.4 (28); 5.6 (36); 9.9 (61); 11.10 (76)	Q1; Q2; Q3; Final	5.2 (32); 6.4 (40); 9.4 (58); 13.11 (89)	Umpires: C Donlon, C Kamolins, S Jeffery; Television broadcast: Seven Network
M Clark 4 J Redden 2 J Polkinghorne, J Polec, J Adcock, L Power, T Rockliff 1	Goals	A Schneider 3 S Milne, J Gram, J Steven 2 F Ray, B Goddard, N Riewoldt, N Dal Santo 1
J Adcock, M Leuenberger, T Rockliff, D Merrett, J Redden, M Clark	Best	L Montagna, B Goddard, A Schneider, J Gram, J Steven, N Riewoldt
R Bewick (back)	Injuries	Nil
Nil	Reports	Nil

==== Round 6 ====
Round 6
30 April 7:10pm	Richmond	def.	Brisbane Lions	MCG (crowd: 37,438)	Report
4.3 (27); 9.6 (60); 14.8 (92); 18.16 (124)	Q1; Q2; Q3; Final	5.3 (33); 5.7 (37); 12.12 (84); 14.14 (98)	Umpires: C Bowen, S Meredith, S Wenn; Television broadcast: Fox Sports
J Riewoldt 5 R Nahas, J King 3 B Nason, T Vickery, M White 2 D Martin 1	Goals	L Power 4 C Beams, D Rich 2 M Clark, J Polkinghorne, T Rockliff, J Redden, T Banfield, M Leuenberger 1
N Foley, D Martin, J King, T Cotchin, B Houli, R Nahas	Best	S Black, T Rockliff, J Adcock, J O'Brien, L Power, J Redden
S Tuck (ribs)	Injuries	Nil
Nil	Reports	Nil
The Lions recorded the worst start to a season since 1998. After North Melbourne won earlier against Port Adelaide, Brisbane is the only team winless.

==== Round 7 ====
Round 7 (QClash)
7 May 7:10pm	Gold Coast	def.	Brisbane Lions	The Gabba (crowd: 25,501)	Report
6.3 (39); 10.8 (68); 13.13 (91); 18.16 (124)	Q1; Q2; Q3; Final	3.2 (20); 6.5 (41); 11.7 (73); 17.14 (116)	Umpires: M Jennings, B Ryan, S McInerney; Marcus Ashcroft Medal: Jared Brennan (Gold Coast); Television broadcast: Fox Sports
N Krakouer 5 B Matera, L Patrick, T Lynch 2 D Stanley, J Brennan, D Harris, J Daye, M Shaw, T McKenzie, S Iles 1	Goals	A McGrath 6 D Rich 3 M Clark, T Banfield 2 C Beams, J Polkinghorne, S Black, J Adcock 1
J Brennan, N Krakouer, Z Smith, M Rischitelli, G Ablett, D Harris	Best	D Rich, S Black, A McGrath, M Leuenberger, P Hanley
D Gorringe	Injuries	A Raines (concussion)
Nil	Reports	Nil
This was the inaugural clash between the Gold Coast Suns and the Brisbane Lions, also known as the Queensland Clash. Jared Brennan and Michael Rischitelli played against their former club for the first time.

==== Round 8 ====
Round 8
14 May 7:10pm	Brisbane Lions	def. by	Essendon	The Gabba (crowd: 24,921)	Report
3.5 (23); 6.7 (43); 6.10 (46); 9.12 (66)	Q1; Q2; Q3; Final	3.2 (20); 6.6 (42); 10.10 (70); 15.12 (102)	Umpires: B Ritchie, M Stevic, C Kamolins; Television broadcast: Network Ten / One HD
A McGrath 2 D Rich, M Clark, R Bewick, C Stiller, J Drummond, J Adcock, T Rockliff 1	Goals	D Zaharakis 4 S Crameri 3 D Hille, J Watson, K Reimers, A Monfries 2
J Adcock, D Rich, D Merrett, M Leuenberger, P Hanley	Best	D Zaharakis, D Hille, A Monfries, C Hooker, D Myers
J Polkinghorne (concussion)	Injuries	M Hurley (calf) replaced in selected side by T Colyer, H Slattery (hip) replaced in selected side by M Hibberd
Nil	Reports	Nil
This match saw Michael Voss and James Hird go head-to-head for the first time as AFL coaches, almost ten years since they captained their respective sides in the 2001 AFL Grand Final. Essendon won at the Gabba for the first time since Round 8, 2000, snapping a six-match losing streak at the venue.

==== Round 9 ====
Round 9
21 May 7:40pm	Brisbane Lions	def.	North Melbourne	The Gabba (crowd: 18,404)	Report
2.3 (15); 4.6 (30); 7.10 (52); 10.13 (73)	Q1; Q2; Q3; Final	2.1 (13); 6.7 (43); 8.9 (57); 8.11 (59)	Umpires: H Kennedy, J Schmitt, S Hay; Television broadcast: Fox Sports
J Brown 4 B Retzlaff, M Clark, S Sheldon, L Power, T Banfield, J Redden 1	Goals	A Edwards 3 D Petrie, L Thomas 2 B Harvey 1
J Brown, J Adcock, J Polkinghorne, P Hanley, T Banfield	Best	B Rawlings, A Swallow, D Petrie, B Harvey, A Edwards
T Rockliff (calf)	Injuries	Nil
Nil	Reports	Nil
The Lions won their first match for 2011. They won their first match at home since Round 10, 2010 and the crowd of 18,404 was the lowest crowd for a Brisbane Lions home game at The Gabba since Round 10, 1999.

==== Round 10 ====
Round 10
29 May 2011, 12:40pm	Adelaide	def. by	Brisbane Lions	AAMI Stadium (crowd: 34,583)	Report
3.2 (20); 5.7 (37); 6.7 (43); 8.13 (61)	Q1; Q2; Q3; Final	1.3 (9); 6.7 (43); 11.11 (77); 15.11 (101)	Umpires: C Donlon, T Pannell, S McInerney; Television broadcast: Fox Sports
S Jacobs, N van Berlo, C Knights, R Henderson, M Wright, B Smith, P Dangerfield, T Walker 1	Goals	A McGrath 4 T Banfield 3 M Clark, B Retzlaff 2 T Collier, L Power, D Rich, J O'Brien 1
S Thompson, R Sloane, C Knights, R Douglas, S Jacobs	Best	M Clark, M Leuenberger, P Hanley, A McGrath, D Merrett, S Black, T Banfield
T Walker (knee), S Jacobs (finger)	Injuries	Nil
Nil	Reports	Nil

==== Round 11 ====
Round 11
4 June 7:40pm	Brisbane Lions	def. by	Sydney	The Gabba (crowd: 22,150)	Report
1.0 (6); 2.2 (14); 5.8 (38); 7.9 (51)	Q1; Q2; Q3; Final	6.7 (43); 13.8 (84); 15.9 (99); 17.14 (116)	Umpires: M Nicholls, C Kamolins, R Findlay; Television broadcast: Fox Sports
B Retzlaff, T Banfield 2 J Brown, S Black, M Clark 1	Goals	L Roberts-Thomson 3 B McGlynn, A Goodes, M Mattner 2 J Kennedy, C Bird, T Dennis-Lane, S Reid, R O'Keefe, A Johnson, M Seaby, J McVeigh 1
M Leuenberger, J Redden, J Polkinghorne, P Hanley, D Merrett	Best	A Goodes, J Bolton, C Bird, R O'Keefe, N Malceski, J McVeigh, L Roberts-Thomson
Nil	Injuries	Nil
Nil	Reports	Nil

==== Round 12 ====
Round 12
12 June 1:10pm	Carlton	def.	Brisbane Lions	Etihad Stadium (crowd: 43,617)	Report
4.4 (28); 8.8 (56); 14.9 (93); 19.10 (124)	Q1; Q2; Q3; Final	2.3 (15); 3.5 (23); 4.8 (32); 9.9 (63)	Umpires: D Margetts, H Kennedy, B Ryan; Television broadcast: Fox Sports
A Walker 5 E Betts 3 J Garlett, D Ellard, M Murphy 2 L Henderson, J Russell, Z Tuohy, S Hampson, A Carrazzo 1	Goals	J Brown 3 A McGrath, M Clark 2 D Rich, T Collier 1
K Simpson, C Judd, M Murphy, H Scotland, A Walker, Z Tuohy	Best	J Redden, T Rockliff, S Black, M Clark
Nil	Injuries	Nil
Nil	Reports	Nil

==== Round 13 ====
Round 13
18 June 7:10pm	Brisbane Lions	def. by	Richmond	The Gabba (crowd: 21,510)	Report
4.2 (26); 7.6 (48); 10.9 (69); 14.10 (94)	Q1; Q2; Q3; Final	2.5 (17); 7.9 (51); 12.13 (85); 18.17 (125)	Umpires: S McBurney, J Schmitt, S Hay; Television broadcast: Fox Sports
J Brown, M Clark, Banfield, P Karnezis, J Redden 2 P Hanley, R Harwood, J Polkinghorne, R Bewick 1	Goals	D Martin 5 T Vickery 4 J Riewoldt, B Miller 2 B Deledio, R Nahas, N Foley, S Grigg, T Cotchin 1
M Leuenberger, J Redden, T Rockliff, P Hanley, T Banfield, M Maguire	Best	T Cotchin, D Martin, T Vickery, B Houli, A Rance, N Foley
M Clark (ankle); T Banfield (hamstring)	Injuries	Nil
Nil	Reports	J King (striking)

==== Round 14 ====
Round 14
25 June 5:40pm	Fremantle	def.	Brisbane Lions	Patersons Stadium (crowd: 30,330)	Report
2.5 (17); 5.6 (36); 10.8 (68); 12.16 (88)	Q1; Q2; Q3; Final	4.1 (25); 7.5 (47); 10.5 (65); 10.5 (65)	Umpires: S Ryan, T Pannell, T Keating; Television broadcast: Fox Sports
M Pavlich 5 G Broughton, C Hinkley 2 R Crowley, N Lower, M Johnson 1	Goals	J Brown, D Rich 2 R Bewick, J Polkinghorne, B Retzlaff, P Karnezis, J Redden, T Rockliff 1
M Pavlich, G Broughton, A Silvagni, N Fyfe, R Crowley, R Palmer	Best	S Black, C Stiller, T Rockliff, J Redden, D Rich, M Leuenberger
M Barlow (general soreness) replaced in selected side by R Hayden, T Mzungu (calf) replaced in selected side by C Hinkley, L McPharlin (groin), A Sandilands (foot)	Injuries	Nil

==== Round 15 ====
Round 15
3 July 1:10pm	Brisbane Lions	def.	Port Adelaide	The Gabba (crowd: 17,276)	Report
4.1 (25); 7.3 (45); 13.5 (83); 15.9 (99)	Q1; Q2; Q3; Final	4.2 (26); 8.5 (53); 13.8 (86); 13.10 (88)	Umpires: R Chamberlain, S Hay, B Ryan; Television broadcast: Fox Sports
J Brown 4 L Power 3 P Karnezis, S Sheldon, A McGrath 2 R Bewick, C Stiller 1	Goals	J Schulz 7 B Ebert 2 D Rodan, S Phillips, D Cassisi, R Gray 1
S Black, L Power, J Brown, A McGrath, J Adcock, A Raines	Best	J Schulz, H Hartlett, D Cassisi, R Gray, T Boak
Nil	Injuries	S Phillips (shoulder)
Substitutes
The crowd of 17,276 was the lowest crowd for a Brisbane Lions home game at the Gabba since Round 22, 1998.

==== Round 16 ====
Round 16
9 July 2:10pm	Hawthorn	def.	Brisbane Lions	Aurora Stadium (crowd: 14,604)	Report
5.2 (32); 6.5 (41); 10.8 (68); 16.9 (105)	Q1; Q2; Q3; Final	1.2 (8); 4.4 (28); 8.5 (53); 9.9 (63)	Umpires: H Kennedy, S Grun, T Pannell; Television broadcast: Fox Sports
L Franklin, B Whitecross, D Hale 3 P Puopolo 2 M Osborne, B Guerra, I Smith, L Shiels, L Hodge 1	Goals	J Brown 3 P Karnezis, J Redden 2 S Sheldon, L Power 1
J Gibson, L Hodge, S Mitchell, L Franklin, B Whitecross, M Bailey, X Ellis, D Hale	Best	T Rockliff, S Black, J Redden, P Hanley, P Karnezis, J Brown, L Power
Nil	Injuries	A McGrath (lower leg), J O'Brien replaced in selected side by R Bewick

==== Round 17 ====
Round 17
17 July 2:10pm	Brisbane Lions	def. by	Geelong	The Gabba (crowd: 19,906)	Report
4.6 (30); 8.8 (56); 13.11 (89); 15.14 (104)	Q1; Q2; Q3; Final	3.4 (22); 9.4 (58); 13.8 (86); 20.13 (133)	Umpires: H Kennedy, C Bowen, T Pannell, B Ryan; Television broadcast: Seven Network
T Banfield 4 M Clark 3 P Karnezis, J Hawksley 2 S Sheldon, L Power, A McGrath, T Rockliff 1	Goals	J Podsiadly 8 T Hawkins 3 J Corey, A Christensen 2 T Hunt, T Varcoe, S Johnson, M Stokes, J Bartel 1
M Leuenberger, S Black, T Banfield, A Raines, P Hanley, T Rockliff	Best	J Podsiadly, J Bartel, J Corey, A Christensen, H Taylor, M Stokes
J Brown (face)	Injuries	Nil
This match saw Michael Voss and Chris Scott go head-to-head for the first time as AFL coaches. Jonathan Brown went off the ground after an accidental collision involving Mitch Clark, which was his second of the season.

==== Round 18 ====
Round 18
23 July 2:10pm	North Melbourne	def.	Brisbane Lions	Etihad Stadium (crowd: 20,809)	Report
4.7 (31); 8.10 (58); 13.16 (88); 17.20 (122)	Q1; Q2; Q3; Final	4.0 (24); 8.5 (53); 10.7 (67); 11.11 (77)	Umpires: J Dalgliesh, R Chamberlain, T Pannell; Television broadcast: Network Ten / One HD
C Pedersen, D Petrie 3 R Bastinac, A Edwards, T Goldstein, K Harper, D Wells 2 B Warren 1	Goals	A Cornelius, P Karnezis 2 T Banfield, S Black, M Clark, J Hawksley, J Polkinghorne, L Power, T Rockliff 1
R Bastinac, Harvey, J Ziebell, A Swallow, D Petrie, L Adams, A Edwards, T Goldstein, S McMahon	Best	S Black, T Rockliff, J Redden, A Raines, M Leuenberger, J Adcock
M Firrito (striking) reported for striking S Black in the second quarter	Reports	Nil

==== Round 19 ====
Round 19
Bye; Brisbane Lions

==== Round 20 ====
Round 20
7 August 1:10pm	Brisbane Lions	def. by	Adelaide	The Gabba (crowd: 17,930)	Report
5.1 (31); 11.6 (72); 14.7 (91); 16.8 (105)	Q1; Q2; Q3; Final	6.3 (39); 9.5 (59); 10.11 (71); 16.14 (110)	Umpires: C Kamolins, J Armstrong, S McInerney; Television broadcast: Fox Sports
A Cornelius 4 A McGrath 3 M Clark, P Karnezis 2 P Hanley, M Leuenberger, T Banfield, J Polkinghorne, T Rockliff 1	Goals	T Walker 4 J Gunston 3 N van Berlo, G Johncock, M Wright 2 R Henderson, S Jacobs, A Riley 1
T Rockliff, S Black, P Hanley, B Staker, A Cornelius, A McGrath	Best	S Thompson, N van Berlo, J Gunston, S Jacobs, R Sloane
J Patfull (hand)	Injuries	C Knights (hip)

==== Round 21 ====
Round 21 (QClash)
13 August 7:10pm	Brisbane Lions	def.	Gold Coast	The Gabba (crowd: 23,565)	Report
5.2 (32); 7.5 (47); 10.11 (71); 18.15 (123)	Q1; Q2; Q3; Final	1.4 (10); 3.6 (24); 4.9 (33); 8.13 (61)	Umpires: B Rosebury, H Ryan, S Wenn; Marcus Ashcroft Medal: Simon Black (Brisbane Lions); Television broadcast: Fox Sports
B Staker, M Clark, J Polkinghorne, S Sheldon, T Banfield, M Leuenberger 2 S Black, A Raines, J Adcock, P Hanley, C Stiller, P Karnezis 1	Goals	M Rischitelli, Shaw 2 G Ablett, J Fraser, D Stanley, H Bennell 1
S Black, J Redden, M Leuenberger, B Staker, T Rockliff, J Drummond	Best	N Bock, Ablett, T McKenzie, J Brennan, S Iles

==== Round 22 ====
Round 22
20 August 7:10pm	Collingwood	def.	Brisbane Lions	MCG (crowd: 47,788)	Report
2.4 (16); 7.10 (52); 12.16 (88); 14.18 (102)	Q1; Q2; Q3; Final	3.5 (23); 5.6 (36); 6.6 (42); 13.6 (84)	Umpires: J Dalgliesh, R Findlay, S Jeffery; Television broadcast: Network Ten / One HD
T Cloke 5 T Young, A Fasolo, D Swan 2 L Brown, B Sinclair 1	Goals	A McGrath 3 A Cornelius, T Rockliff, B Staker 2 T Banfield, N McKeever, L Power, S Sheldon 1

==== Round 23 ====
Round 23
27 August 7:10pm	Brisbane Lions	def. by	West Coast	The Gabba (crowd: 13,500)	Report
4.4 (28); 7.6 (48); 9.12 (66); 11.15 (81)	Q1; Q2; Q3; Final	5.2 (32); 5.5 (35); 9.10 (64); 13.11 (89)	Umpires: S McBurney, B Ryan, J Mollison; Television broadcast: Fox Sports
T Rockliff 2 J Drummond, P Karnezis, J Polkinghorne, L Power, J Redden, D Rich, S Sheldon, J Adcock, A Cornelius 1	Goals	C Masten 3 M Nicoski 2 A Gaff, A Hams, J Kennedy, M LeCras, Q Lynch, B Ebert, M Priddis, L Shuey 1
Black, A Raines, D Rich, P Hanley, T Rockliff	Best	Q Lynch, A Gaff, M Priddis, C Masten, L Shuey
B Staker (knee), T Banfield (hamstring)	Injuries	D Cox (eye)
Nil	Reports	J Kennedy (West Coast) for striking M Golby in the fourth quarter

==== Round 24 ====
Round 24
3 September 4:10pm	Sydney	def.	Brisbane Lions	SCG (crowd: 27,721)	Live Score
3.3 (21); 11.7 (73); 14.9 (93); 18.11 (119)	Q1; Q2; Q3; Final	4.3 (27); 6.6 (42); 9.9 (63); 9.13 (67)	Umpires: D Margetts, R Chamberlain, S Meredith; Television broadcast: Fox Sports
A Goodes, J Bolton 4 G Rohan, M Spangher 3 L Parker 2 D Hannebery, N Malceski 1	Goals	A McGrath 3 P Karnezis 2 A Cornelius, J Hawksley, J Redden, D Rich 1

== Ladder ==
2011 AFL ladder
Pos	Team	Pld	W	L	D	PF	PA	PP	Pts	
1	Collingwood	22	20	2	0	2592	1546	167.7	80	Finals series
2	Geelong (P)	22	19	3	0	2548	1619	157.4	76	Finals series
3	Hawthorn	22	18	4	0	2355	1634	144.1	72	Finals series
4	West Coast	22	17	5	0	2235	1715	130.3	68	Finals series
5	Carlton	22	14	7	1	2225	1700	130.9	58	Finals series
6	St Kilda	22	12	9	1	1891	1677	112.8	50	Finals series
7	Sydney	22	12	9	1	1897	1735	109.3	50	Finals series
8	Essendon	22	11	10	1	2217	2217	100.0	46	Finals series
9	North Melbourne	22	10	12	0	2106	2082	101.2	40	
10	Western Bulldogs	22	9	13	0	2060	2155	95.6	36	
11	Fremantle	22	9	13	0	1791	2155	83.1	36	
12	Richmond	22	8	13	1	2069	2396	86.4	34	
13	Melbourne	22	8	13	1	1974	2315	85.3	34	
14	Adelaide	22	7	15	0	1742	2193	79.4	28	
15	Brisbane Lions	22	4	18	0	1814	2240	81.0	16	
16	Port Adelaide	22	3	19	0	1718	2663	64.5	12	
17	Gold Coast	22	3	19	0	1534	2726	56.3	12	

Source: AFL ladder
Rules for classification: 1) points; 2) percentage; 3) number of points for.
(P) Premiers

== Leading Goalkickers ==
Rank	Player	Goals	Behinds	Best Performance
Rank	Player	Goals	Behinds	G.B (Pts)	Round and Opponent
1	Mitch Clark	25	12	4.1 (25)	Round 5 v St Kilda
2	Jonathan Brown	22	11	4.1 (25)	Round 9 v North Melbourne; Round 15 v Port Adelaide
3	Todd Banfield	21	14	4.2 (25)	Round 17 v Geelong
4	Ashley McGrath	20	9	6.0 (36)	Round 7 v Gold Coast
5	Luke Power	17	9	4.2 (26)	Round 6 v Richmond
6	Patrick Karnezis	13	7	2.3 (15)	Round 16 v Hawthorn
7	Daniel Rich	12	11	3.3 (21)	Round 7 v Gold Coast
8	Jack Redden	12	4	2.1 (13)	Round 5 v St Kilda
9	James Polkinghorne	11	14	2.1 (13)	Round 2 v Western Bulldogs
10	Tom Rockliff	8	7	2.0 (12)	Round 6 v Richmond; Round 18 v North Melbourne

== Awards and Milestones ==
=== Milestones ===
Round	Player	Milestone
1	Joel Patfull	100 games
1	Ryan Lester	Debut
1	Rohan Bewick	Debut
1	Claye Beams	Debut
2	Broc McCauley	Debut
3	Jared Polec	Debut
5	Daniel Rich	50 games
5	Michael Voss	50 games coached
7	Matthew Leuenberger	50 games
7	Bryce Retzlaff	Debut
8	Luke Power	300 official AFL games
9	Josh Green	Debut
12	James Polkinghorne	50 games
12	Mitchell Golby	Debut
14	Niall McKeever	Debut
20	Jack Redden	50 games
20	Josh Dyson	Debut
