= 2013 Brisbane Lions season =

Coordinates: 27°29′9″S 153°2′17″E

Brisbane Lions
2013 season
- Coach: Michael Voss (until August 13); Mark Harvey (from August 13) (caretaker)
- Australian Football League: 10th
- NAB Cup: Winners
- Top goalscorer: Jonathan Brown (28)
- Highest home attendance: 27,170 vs. Gold Coast (6 July 2013)
- Lowest home attendance: 13,855 vs. Greater Western Sydney (17 August 2013)
- Average home league attendance: 21,083

This article covers the 2013 AFL season results for the Brisbane Lions.

== Draft picks ==
Round	Pick	Player	Recruited from
1	8	Sam Mayes	North Adelaide
1	23	Marco Paparone ^{[a]}	East Fremantle
2	32	Michael Close	North Ballarat Rebels

- ^{a} Gold Coast uncontracted player compensation pick (Rischitelli)

== Players ==
Brisbane Lions 2013 squad
Senior list		Rookie list	Coaching staff
1 Sam Docherty; 2 Ryan Harwood; 3 Brent Moloney; 4 Jared Polec; 5 Billy Longer; 6 Josh Green; 7 Jed Adcock (c); 8 Rohan Bewick; 9 Ashley McGrath; 10 Daniel Rich (vc); 11 Pearce Hanley; 12 Stefan Martin; 14 Brent Staker; 15 Dayne Zorko; 16 Jonathan Brown (c) (vet); 17 Claye Beams; 18 Todd Banfield; 19 Jordan Lisle; 20 Simon Black (vet); 21 Daniel Merrett	22 Marco Paparone; 23 Matthew Leuenberger; 24 Joel Patfull; 26 Elliot Yeo; 28 Patrick Karnezis; 29 Andrew Raines; 30 Jack Redden; 31 James Polkinghorne; 32 Sam Mayes; 34 Michael Close; 34 Jesse O'Brien; 35 Ryan Lester; 36 Matt Maguire; 37 Patrick Wearden; 38 Tom Rockliff (vc); 40 Niall McKeever; 41 Mitchell Golby; 44 Aaron Cornelius; 47 Jack Crisp	13 Callum Bartlett; 25 Richard Newell; 42 Justin Clarke; 43 Nicholas Hayes; 45 Jordon Bourke; 46 Sam Michael; 48 Stephen Wrigley	Head coach: Michael Voss; Assistant coaches: Mark Harvey (Assistant); Shane Woewodin (Forward); Gary O'Donnell (Midfield); Adrian Fletcher (Defence); Jamie Charman (Ruck); Legend: (c) Captain(s); (vc) Vice-captain(s); Injury list; Upgraded rookie(s); (vet) Veterans list

== Results ==
=== Regular season ===
==== Home and Away Season ====
===== Round 1 =====
Round 1
Saturday, 30 March (1:40pm)	Western Bulldogs	def.	Brisbane Lions	Docklands (crowd: 25,263)	Report
6.1 (37); 10.5 (65); 16.9 (105); 19.13 (127)	Q1; Q2; Q3; Final	0.6 (6); 3.10 (28); 5.14 (44); 7.17 (59)

===== Round 2 =====
Round 2
Saturday, 6 April (3:40pm)	Brisbane Lions	def. by	Adelaide	The Gabba (crowd: 21,308)	Report
2.3 (15); 6.5 (41); 10.13 (73); 10.17 (77)	Q1; Q2; Q3; Final	2.3 (15); 7.6 (48); 9.11 (65); 14.12 (96)

===== Round 3 =====
Round 3
Saturday, 13 April (7:40pm)	Gold Coast	def. by	Brisbane Lions	Carrara (crowd: 12,961)	Report
3.5 (23); 4.7 (31); 8.11 (59); 13.14 (92)	Q1; Q2; Q3; Final	4.5 (29); 6.13 (49); 10.14 (74); 13.16 (94)

===== Round 4 =====
Round 4
Sunday, 21 April (4:40pm)	North Melbourne	def.	Brisbane Lions	Docklands (crowd: 22,776)	Report
5.10 (40); 8.13 (61); 15.16 (106); 18.17 (125)	Q1; Q2; Q3; Final	1.2 (8); 4.5 (29); 6.5 (41); 9.8 (62)

===== Round 5 =====
Round 5
Sunday, 28 April (3:20pm)	Brisbane Lions	def.	Melbourne	The Gabba (crowd: 19,018)	Report
5.3 (33); 7.11 (53); 13.14 (92); 17.20 (122)	Q1; Q2; Q3; Final	5.3 (33); 7.5 (47); 10.7 (67); 14.10 (94)

===== Round 6 =====
Round 6
Sunday, 5 May (1:10pm)	Sydney	def.	Brisbane Lions	Sydney Cricket Ground (crowd: 22,315)	Report
7.4 (46); 10.8 (68); 13.11 (89); 17.13 (115)	Q1; Q2; Q3; Final	1.0 (6); 4.2 (26); 5.5 (35); 8.7 (55)

===== Round 7 =====
Round 7
Saturday, 11 May (2:10pm)	Brisbane Lions	def. by	West Coast	The Gabba (crowd: 17,614)	Report
3.0 (18); 6.6 (42); 9.9 (63); 12.10 (82)	Q1; Q2; Q3; Final	4.2 (26); 7.2 (44); 10.3 (63); 17.6 (108)

===== Round 8 =====
Round 8
Saturday, 18 May (1:45pm)	Essendon	def. by	Brisbane Lions	Docklands (crowd: 33,915)	Report
3.1 (19); 7.6 (48); 10.9 (69); 12.14 (86)	Q1; Q2; Q3; Final	3.4 (22); 6.5 (41); 11.7 (73); 14.12 (96)

===== Round 9 =====
Round 9
Saturday, 25 May (7:40pm)	Brisbane Lions	def. by	Carlton	The Gabba (crowd: 24,037)	Report
3.1 (19); 9.4 (58); 10.10 (70); 12.13 (85)	Q1; Q2; Q3; Final	6.5 (41); 8.7 (55); 12.13 (85); 13.20 (98)

===== Round 10 =====
Round 10
Friday, 31 May (7:50pm)	Brisbane Lions	def. by	Collingwood	The Gabba (crowd: 26,626)	Report
1.1 (7); 2.4 (16); 5.6 (36); 7.9 (51)	Q1; Q2; Q3; Final	5.3 (33); 9.7 (61); 12.14 (86); 14.16 (100)

===== Round 11 =====
Bye

===== Round 12 =====
Round 12
Saturday, 15 June (4:40pm)	Fremantle	def.	Brisbane Lions	Subiaco (crowd: 33,384)	Report
3.4 (22); 6.7 (43); 8.9 (57); 12.14 (86)	Q1; Q2; Q3; Final	2.1 (13); 3.7 (25); 4.9 (33); 6.10 (46)

===== Round 13 =====
Round 13
Sunday, 23 June (4:40pm)	Brisbane Lions	def.	Geelong	The Gabba (crowd: 24,164)	Report
3.2 (20); 5.4 (34); 7.8 (50); 15.13 (103)	Q1; Q2; Q3; Final	5.3 (33); 9.7 (61); 13.10 (88); 14.14 (98)

===== Round 14 =====
Round 14
Sunday, 30 June (1:10pm)	Hawthorn	def.	Brisbane Lions	York Park (crowd: 15,796)	Report
3.8 (26); 8.9 (57); 15.15 (105); 21.17 (143)	Q1; Q2; Q3; Final	1.2 (8); 5.5 (35); 7.7 (49); 12.13 (85)

===== Round 15 =====
Round 15
Saturday, 6 July (4:40pm)	Brisbane Lions	def.	Gold Coast	The Gabba (crowd: 27,170)	Report
3.8 (26); 8.9 (57); 12.12 (84); 17.14 (116)	Q1; Q2; Q3; Final	2.6 (18); 5.10 (40); 10.10 (70); 12.11 (83)

===== Round 16 =====
Round 16
Saturday, 13 July (7:40pm)	Brisbane Lions	def.	North Melbourne	The Gabba (crowd: 18,131)	Report
2.2 (14); 5.5 (35); 11.6 (72); 18.9 (117)	Q1; Q2; Q3; Final	5.1 (31); 5.6 (36); 14.3 (87); 17.3 (105)

===== Round 17 =====
Round 17
Saturday, 20 July (7:10pm)	Melbourne	def. by	Brisbane Lions	Marrara Oval (crowd: 7,615)	Report
5.1 (31); 6.5 (41); 10.7 (67); 11.9 (75)	Q1; Q2; Q3; Final	3.4 (22); 8.5 (53); 11.12 (78); 13.16 (94)

===== Round 18 =====
Round 18
Saturday, 28 July (12:40pm)	Port Adelaide	def.	Brisbane Lions	Football Park (crowd: 22,631)	Report
3.4 (22); 5.9 (39); 8.16 (64); 9.17 (71)	Q1; Q2; Q3; Final	1.4 (10); 4.5 (29); 9.6 (60); 9.8 (62)

===== Round 19 =====
Round 19
Saturday, 3 August (7:40pm)	Brisbane Lions	def.	St Kilda	The Gabba (crowd: 19,856)	Report
3.3 (21); 9.3 (57); 12.9 (81); 16.12 (108)	Q1; Q2; Q3; Final	2.2 (14); 5.3 (33); 9.9 (63); 11.11 (77)

===== Round 20 =====
Round 20
Saturday, 10 August (1:45pm)	Richmond	def.	Brisbane Lions	MCG (crowd: 46,961)	Report
6.2 (38); 11.7 (73); 11.9 (75); 14.13 (97)	Q1; Q2; Q3; Final	1.3 (9); 4.4 (28); 7.7 (49); 11.8 (74)

===== Round 21 =====
Round 21
Saturday, 17 August (7:40pm)	Brisbane Lions	def.	Greater Western Sydney	The Gabba (crowd: 13,855)	Report
5.5 (35); 12.7 (79); 16.12 (108); 18.15 (123)	Q1; Q2; Q3; Final	1.1 (7); 3.2 (20); 4.4 (28); 9.9 (63)

===== Round 22 =====
Round 22
Sunday, 25 August (4:40pm)	Brisbane Lions	def.	Western Bulldogs	The Gabba (crowd: 20,130)	Report
7.1 (43); 13.2 (80); 14.3 (87); 15.10 (100)	Q1; Q2; Q3; Final	2.5 (17); 4.6 (30); 8.11 (59); 13.15 (93)

===== Round 23 =====
Round 23
Saturday, 31 August (2:10pm)	Geelong	def.	Brisbane Lions	Kardinia Park (crowd: 27,467)	Report
5.5 (35); 7.11 (53); 12.20 (92); 15.22 (112)	Q1; Q2; Q3; Final	3.3 (21); 9.5 (59); 11.6 (72); 17.9 (111)

All times are local.
