= History of the Brisbane Lions =

History of Australian Rules Football club

The Brisbane Lions are an Australian rules football club. The Queensland-based expansion club was formed in 1987, as the Brisbane Bears. In late 1996, via a deal with the administrator of the 1883 VFL/AFL foundation club Fitzroy Football Club, Fitzroy's club operations at the AFL level were merged with that of the Bears. Subsequently, in accordance with the Deed of Arrangement between Fitzroy Football Club and Brisbane Bears, Brisbane Bears changed their name to become Brisbane Bears-Fitzroy Football Club (trading as Brisbane Lions). The colours of maroon, blue, and gold were drawn from both clubs.

== Triple premiership success: 2001–2003 ==
As the Brisbane Lions, the club won its first AFL premiership in the 2001 AFL Grand Final, defeating Essendon 15.18 (108) to 12.10 (82). Lions utility player Shaun Hart won the Norm Smith Medal as best on ground in the Grand Final. On the morning after winning the flag, the club took the premiership cup to the Brunswick Street Oval in Fitzroy, the home of the Fitzroy Football Club. It was an important way of connecting with Melbourne-based Lions fans, many of whom had previously supported Fitzroy, and Fitzroy supporters who were not supporting the Brisbane Lions, by honouring the history of the club. The premiership cup then made its historic first trip to Brisbane, a traditionally rugby league-focused city.

In the same year, Brisbane Lion (and former Bear) midfielder Jason Akermanis won the league's highest individual honour, the Brownlow Medal.

In 2002, the Lions won back-to-back premierships when they again defeated Collingwood 9.12 (66) to 10.15 (75) in the 2002 AFL Grand Final in cold and wet conditions, at the Melbourne Cricket Ground. Early in the contest the Lions lost both ruckman Beau McDonald and utility player Martin Pike (who had already had nine possessions in the first quarter) to injury and had to complete the match with a limited bench. Despite not scoring a goal in the first quarter, the undermanned Lions overcame a spirited Collingwood, in the closest grand final in 15 years. Controversy surrounded the awarding of the Norm Smith medal for best player in the grand final to Collingwood captain Nathan Buckley. The voting panel cast its votes 20 minutes before the conclusion of the match. However, Lions captain Michael Voss was dominant in the final quarter to lead his team to victory and many speculated that, had voting taken place at the final siren, Voss may have won the award over Buckley. The voting procedure was changed for subsequent grand finals.

In 2002, Brisbane Lions midfielder Simon Black won the Brownlow Medal for best and fairest player of the 2002 season. Accordingly, the Brisbane Lions became the first grand finalist in VFL/AFL history to have three Brownlow Medallists in its line-up, the three being 1996 winner Michael Voss, 2001 winner Jason Akermanis and 2002 winner Simon Black.

In 2002 former Brisbane lawyer Michael Bowers became chief executive officer as part of a move to turn around the club's problematic finances.

With a number of players under an injury cloud – and having lost to Collingwood in a qualifying final at the Melbourne Cricket Ground three weeks previously – the Lions went into the game as underdogs. However, they sealed their place in history as an AFL dynasty by thrashing the Magpies in cool but sunny conditions. At one stage in the final quarter the Lions led by almost 80 points before relaxing when the match was well and truly won, allowing Collingwood to score the last four goals. The final score of 20.14 (134) to 12.12 (84) saw the club become only the fourth in VFL/AFL history to win three consecutive premierships and the first since the creation of the AFL. Simon Black claimed the Norm Smith Medal with a dominant 39 possession match, the most possessions ever gathered by a player in a grand final.

The 2004 season saw Brisbane remain in the top portion of the ladder for most of the season. In round 22, they set the VFL/AFL record for having the most experienced team in history. The 22-man Brisbane Lions squad had collectively played 3,740 senior career games, and had collectively scored 3,399 senior career goals. Only four of the 22 players had not played over 100 AFL games;Jonathan Brown (90 games), Robert Copeland (74 games), Dylan McLaren (26 games) and Richard Hadley (24 games).

Reaching the finals in second position, Brisbane controversially had to travel to Melbourne to play against Geelong in the preliminary final, due to a contract between the Melbourne Cricket Ground (MCG) and the Australian Football League (AFL) guaranteeing one preliminary final would be played each year at the MCG. Port Adelaide had finished on top of the ladder and hosted the other preliminary final in Adelaide. Despite this setback, Brisbane beat Geelong and reached the AFL Grand Final for the fourth consecutive year. Their opponents, Port Adelaide, playing in their first ever grand final, were too good on the day and recorded a 40-point win.

== Rebuild of the Lions' second generation: 2005–2008 ==
The Lions opened the 2005 AFL season with a 23-point win over St Kilda, but the game was overshadowed by an incident involving the Saints' captain Nick Riewoldt and Brisbane defenders Mal Michael and Chris Scott. Riewoldt injured his shoulder attempting a mark, but after he stayed on the field and refused medical attention, Michael and Scott both bumped into him. Riewoldt then left the ground, and was alter diagnosed with a broken collarbone. The Brisbane players were later cleared of any wrongdoing, although making unnecessary contact to an injured player would become illegal in the years to come.

The team fell away badly towards the end, losing many games by very large margins. This culminated in a record 139-point defeat by St Kilda in the final round.

On 7 June 2007 Lions co-captain Simon Black and former Lions captain Michael Voss were charged for an assault that allegedly took place on the eve of the 2006 AFL Grand Final.

== Michael Voss era: 2009–2013 ==
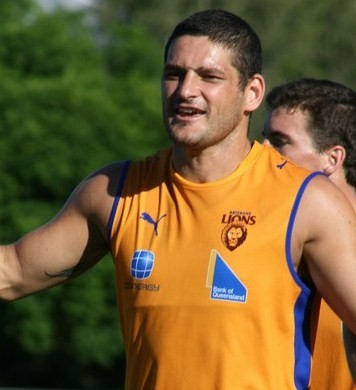
Brendan Fevola became the 1st Coleman Medallist to win the medal at a club and be traded to another the following year. He originally came from Carlton

In the first round, Brisbane defeated Melbourne by 45 points at the MCG. It showed promising signs for the future, with good performances from Jared Polec, Niall McKeever, Matthew Leuenberger, Todd Banfield, Rohan Bewick and Rising Star nominee Claye Beams. Older players, such as Simon Black, Daniel Merrett, Ashley McGrath, Jed Adcock and new recruit Ben Hudson also performed well. Only one change was made for round two, Jesse O'Brien was included for Sam Sheldon. The Lions suffered their greatest ever loss at the Gabba in Round 2, losing to Carlton by 91 points, with Black breaking his wrist. The following week, the Lions were beaten at the hands of Fremantle by 29 points, with the Lions recording a record low 20 inside 50's for the match since Champion Data began recording these statistics.

On 13 August 2013, coach Michael Voss was told that his contract would not be renewed.

== Playing under Justin Leppitsch: 2014–2016 ==
With the retirement of Ashley McGrath in August 2014, no active players remain from any of the club's triple-premiership winning sides.

== Chris Fagan era: 2017– ==
On 4 October 2016, Hawthorn football manager Chris Fagan was announced as the Lions' new senior coach for the 2017 season.
