= Brisbane Lions v Geelong (2013 AFL season) =

2013 AFL premiership season

Brisbane Lions	Geelong
15.13 (103)	14.14 (98)
	1	2	3	4
BL	3.2 (20)	5.4 (34)	7.8 (50)	15.13 (103)
GEE	5.3 (33)	9.7 (61)	13.10 (88)	14.14 (98)
- Date: 23 June 2013
- Stadium: The Gabba
- Attendance: 24,164
- Umpires: Donlon, Bannister, Wenn

Broadcast in Australia
- Network: Fox Footy
- Commentators: Anthony Hudson, Gerard Healy, Brad Johnson, David King

In round 13, 2013, an Australian Football League home-and-away match was played between the Brisbane Lions and Geelong. In the match, the Lions came back from a 52-point deficit during the third quarter to clinch a 5-point win with a goal after the siren. The win was the eighth-biggest comeback in VFL/AFL history, and the largest in the history of the Brisbane Lions. The match is colloquially known as the Miracle on Grass, after an exclamation made by commentator Anthony Hudson after the final goal was kicked.

== Background ==
Prior to the game, Geelong was in second place on the ladder with 10 wins and one loss. By contrast, Brisbane was in the bottom four with only three wins. The game was the 200th of Brisbane veteran Ash McGrath. Coming into the match, Geelong were the heavy favourites to win.

== Teams ==
Brisbane Lions	Geelong

Brisbane Lions
B:	7 Jed Adcock (c)	21 Daniel Merrett	42 Justin Clarke
HB:	10 Daniel Rich	24 Joel Patfull	26 Elliot Yeo
C:	3 Brent Moloney	30 Jack Redden	41 Mitch Golby
HF:	38 Tom Rockliff	19 Jordan Lisle	15 Dayne Zorko
F:	9 Ashley McGrath	16 Jonathan Brown (c)	14 Brent Staker
Foll:	23 Matthew Leuenberger	20 Simon Black	11 Pearce Hanley
Int:	1 Sam Docherty	35 Ryan Lester	32 Sam Mayes
Int:	2 Ryan Harwood (sub)		
Coach:	Michael Voss		

Geelong
B:	44 Corey Enright	13 Tom Lonergan	29 Cameron Guthrie
HB:	11 Joel Corey	7 Harry Taylor	19 Taylor Hunt
C:	4 Andrew Mackie	14 Joel Selwood (c)	9 James Kelly
HF:	46 Mark Blicavs	31 James Podsiadly	28 Allen Christensen
F:	21 Jordan Murdoch	26 Tom Hawkins	32 Steven Motlop
Foll:	16 Dawson Simpson	20 Steve Johnson	3 Jimmy Bartel
Int:	27 Matthew Stokes	22 Mitch Duncan	8 Josh Hunt
Int:	41 Jesse Stringer (sub)		
Coach:	Chris Scott		

== The game ==
=== First three quarters ===
Geelong kicked the first two goals of the game, and while Brisbane managed to gain the lead early, by half-time Geelong had a 27-point lead. This lead only widened, and late in the third quarter, with Brisbane down 52 points, they looked certain to go down in defeat. However, Brisbane managed to kick two goals late in the quarter, lowering the lead to 38 points.

=== Voss's speech ===
At three-quarter time, Brisbane coach Michael Voss gave a speech to the Brisbane players, wherein he encouraged the players to follow the game plan he had devised, and he told them that they still had a chance of winning. The speech was credited by McGrath for the Lions' victory.

=== Final quarter ===
Early in the fourth quarter, Geelong players Steve Johnson and Steven Motlop both missed shots on goal, widening the margin slightly to 40 points. Soon after, Johnson was attempting to move the ball up the ground for another attempt on goal; however, when he kicked the ball, it bounced off an umpire, and, in the ensuing passage of play, Brisbane player Dayne Zorko managed to score a goal, lowering the margin to 34 points. Brisbane players Brent Moloney and Jed Adcock both kicked goals afterwards, lowering the margin to 20 points. Johnson then managed to kick a goal for Geelong, raising the margin to 26 points; it would, however, be their last goal for the match. Goals for Brisbane to Pearce Hanley, Moloney and Mitch Golby lowered the margin to 7 points, and a behind to Jonathan Brown lowered the margin to a goal. Then, with just over a minute and a half on the clock, Brisbane's Daniel Rich scored a goal, levelling the score. However, star Geelong forward Tom Hawkins then managed to score a behind. The ball was rushed towards the Brisbane goal, but Geelong player Josh Hunt took an intercept mark and the ball moved towards Geelong's goal, where Brisbane's Daniel Merrett managed to take a mark. With only 18 seconds left to play and deep in Geelong's forward line, it seemed almost certain that Geelong would win by a point. However, in those 18 seconds, Brisbane managed to deftly move the ball across the ground with a series of skilfully interlinking possessions, and McGrath took a mark a second before the siren sounded. McGrath proceeded to kick a goal after the siren, winning the game for Brisbane.

== Scoreboard ==
2013 AFL season – Round 13
Sunday, 23 June 16:40 AEST (UTC+10)	Brisbane Lions	def.	Geelong	The Gabba, Brisbane (crowd: 24,164)	Report
3.2 (20); 5.4 (34); 7.8 (50); 15.13 (103)	Q1; Q2; Q3; Final	5.3 (33); 9.7 (61); 13.10 (88); 14.14 (98)	Umpires: Donlon, Bannister, Wenn; Television broadcast: Fox Footy
McGrath 3, Moloney 3, Rich 2, Lisle, Patfull, Brown, Zorko, Adcock, Hanley, Golby	Goals	Hawkins 3, Christensen 2, Motlop 2, Johnson 2, Mackie, Guthrie, Murdoch, Blicavs, Podsiadly
Moloney, McGrath, Rich, Black, Redden	Best	Bartel, Johnson, Blicavs, Selwood, Stokes, Enright
Nil	Injuries	Nil
Nil	Reports	Nil
Ash McGrath completed a 52-point comeback for the Brisbane Lions with a goal after the final siren.

Brownlow Medal votes
3 S. Black; 2 S. Johnson; 1 B. Moloney

== Aftermath ==
Voss stated after the match that he hoped the victory would improve Brisbane's performance for the rest of the season. His position as coach had been considered to be in danger coming into the match, and the stunning victory was viewed as having potentially saved his career. Voss was sacked later that year, after many Brisbane players had threatened to refuse to play if his contract was renewed. Brisbane did not defeat Geelong again until 2019.

== In popular culture ==
The "Miracle on Grass" is an achievement in AFL Evolution 2, achieved by winning after overcoming a 52-point deficit. The game was used in the promotional video for the launch of the 2021 AFL season.

== See also ==
- 2013 AFL season
- Essendon v Kangaroos (2001 AFL season)
- Miracle Match (Australian rules football)
- Greater Western Sydney v Brisbane Lions (2024 AFL semi-final)
