= Miracle on Grass =

Miracle on Grass may refer to:

- United States v England (1950 FIFA World Cup), an association football match in 1950 in which the United States defeated England
- Miracle on Grass (Australian rules football), an AFL match in 2013 in which the Brisbane Lions defeated the Geelong Cats

== See also ==
- Miracle on Ice
