= Ben Ryan (umpire) =

Australian rules football umpire

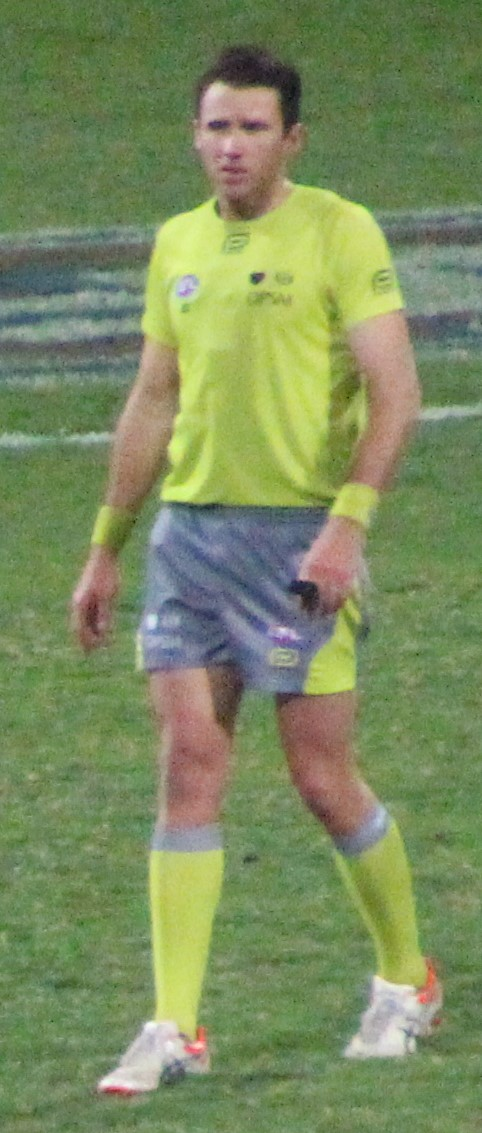
- Ryan at a game between the Brisbane Lions and the Gold Coast Suns in August 2017

Personal information
- Full name: Benjamin Ryan
- Nicknames: Ben, Hollywood
- Height: 182 cm (6 ft 0 in)
- Weight: 78 kg (172 lb)
- Other occupation: Primary school teacher

Umpiring career
Years	League	Role	Games
2011–2017	AFL	Field umpire	122

Benjamin "Ben" Ryan is an Australian rules football umpire who officiated in the Australian Football League.

He started his umpiring career in Queensland, officiating in the 2008, '09, and '10 Queensland Australian Football League Grand Finals. He was appointed to the AFL list in 2011 and made his debut in Round 3 of that year, in a match between the Western Bulldogs and Gold Coast. He left the AFL list at the end of the 2017 season after 122 games.
