= Clayton Hinkley =

Australian rules footballer

Personal information
- Full name: Clayton Hinkley
- Born: 21 February 1989 (age 37)
- Original team: North Ballarat (TAC Cup)
- Draft: No. 24, 2007 National Draft, Fremantle
- Height: 186 cm (6 ft 1 in)
- Weight: 80 kg (176 lb)
- Position: Midfielder

Playing career^{1}
| Years | Club | Games (Goals) |
| 2008–2011 | Fremantle | 22 (5) |
- ^{1} Playing statistics correct to the end of 2011.

Clayton Hinkley (born 21 February 1989) is an Australian rules footballer who formerly played for the Fremantle Football Club. He was selected with the 24th selection in the 2007 AFL National Draft.

Hinkley was a member of Victoria Country's National Under 18s Championships side and co-captained North Ballarat in the TAC Cup A quick midfielder, Hinkley ranked equal second in the 20-metre sprints, third in the agility test and fourth in the shuttle run at the 2007 AFL Draft Camp.

Since 2008 he has played for Swan Districts in the WAFL when not selected to play in the AFL.

Hinkley was delisted from the Dockers on 7 September 2011, and played for Port Melbourne in the Victorian Football League in 2012 and 2013 before playing for the Warrack Eagles in the Wimmera Football League in 2014. He played for Birchip-Watchem Bulls in the North Central Football League in 2021 and 2022, and was a member of Birchip-Watchem's senior premiership team in 2022.
