= Mitch Clark (Australian footballer) =

Australian rules footballer

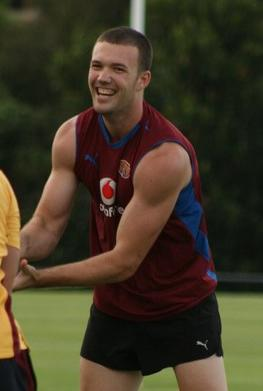
- Clark with the Brisbane Lions in December 2008

Personal information
- Full name: Mitchell Clark
- Born: 19 October 1987 (age 39)
- Original team: East Fremantle (WAFL)
- Draft: No. 9, 2005 National Draft
- Height: 200 cm (6 ft 7 in)
- Weight: 103 kg (227 lb)
- Position: Forward, ruckman

Playing career^{1}
Years	Club	Games (Goals)
2006–2011	Brisbane Lions	82 (61)
2012–2013	Melbourne	15 (36)
2015–2016	Geelong	9 (14)
Total		106 (111)
- ^{1} Playing statistics correct to the end of 2016.

Career highlights
- Brisbane Lions leading goalkicker: 2011; Melbourne leading goalkicker: 2012; AFL Rising Star nominee: 2007

Mitchell Clark (born 19 October 1987) is a former professional Australian rules footballer who played for the Brisbane Lions, Melbourne Football Club and Geelong Football Club in the Australian Football League (AFL).

== Junior career ==
Clark began his football career with East Fremantle in the Western Australian Football League (WAFL).

== AFL career ==
=== Brisbane (2006–2011) ===
Although Clark was hit by meningococcal disease the week before the 2005 AFL draft, Brisbane showed their strong interest, making him their first pick, the ninth player drafted across all clubs and presenting him with their number "1" guernsey; he later made a full recovery from his illness. Clark made an impressive debut for the Brisbane Lions in the first round of the 2006 season against Geelong, converting his first mark and subsequent kick into a goal, but his debut season was significantly hampered by injury problems, in particular osteitis pubis, and only ended up playing a total six games that season.

"He's going to be dangerous. Jeez, you'd love to be able to run like that."

— Jonathan Brown

Clark played his first game for the 2007 season in round nine against Collingwood, after overcoming his injury problems. His five goals in that match earned him an AFL Rising Star nomination. However, the promising return lasted only three weeks before Clark was hit by injury again, allowing him only one more game that season.

Even before the 2008 season began, Clark was already in injury strife, after injuring his quad during pre-season training. Clark played his first game for 2008 in round seven against Geelong, and lost by 27 points after falling away in the last quarter. Clark kicked three goals in the process. He managed to string together twelve consecutive games for the season, but was sidelined for the remainder after the round 18 clash with North Melbourne, during which he injured his quads yet again.

2009 turned out to be a breakthrough year for Clark. Season-ending injuries to Matthew Leuenberger and Jamie Charman resulted in Clark shouldering the Brisbane ruck duties for the majority of the season. Leaving his injury prone tendencies behind, Clark played in all 24 possible games, including two finals. By the end of the season, Clark had gained acknowledgement as one of the competition's elite mobile ruckmen, was rewarded by selection in the 40-man All-Australian squad, and was considered unlucky to miss out on selection in the final team.

=== Melbourne (2012–2014) ===
At the completion of the 2011 season Clark informed the Brisbane Lions he would not be renewing his contract with the club and that he desired a move home to Perth. Fremantle Dockers were close to signing the key position player but equivocated on compensation for the Lions, and Clark was eventually swayed by a significantly better offer from the Melbourne Demons, which also provided a better result for the Lions. He was given the number 11 guernsey at the Demons, made famous by Jim Stynes, who also presented it to him.

Clark starred in the first half of his debut season, kicking 29 goals in 11 games to sit equal-fourth in the Coleman Medal, before tearing his Lisfranc ligament in his foot against GWS in round 13. This injury ruled him out for the rest of the season and held him back in 2013 as well, where he played just the four games.

In April 2014 Clark announced his immediate retirement from football, due to clinical depression and personal issues.

=== Geelong (2015–2016) ===
On 15 October 2014 Clark was traded to the Cats in a deal which saw Travis Varcoe join Collingwood and Heritier Lumumba join Melbourne. At the conclusion of the 2016 season, he was delisted by Geelong.

== Statistics ==
Legend
G	Goals	K	Kicks	D	Disposals	T	Tackles
B	Behinds	H	Handballs	M	Marks	H/O	Hit-outs

Season	Team	No.	Games	Totals								Averages (per game)							
Season	Team	No.	Games	G	B	K	H	D	M	T	H/O	G	B	K	H	D	M	T	H/O
2006	Brisbane Lions	1	6	3	2	32	17	49	18	17	20	0.5	0.3	5.3	2.9	8.2	3.0	2.8	3.3
2007	Brisbane Lions	1	4	7	6	25	11	36	19	5	8	1.8	1.5	6.3	2.8	9.1	4.8	1.3	2.0
2008	Brisbane Lions	1	12	8	7	73	44	117	48	18	49	0.7	0.6	6.1	3.7	9.8	4.0	1.5	4.1
2009	Brisbane Lions	1	24	7	7	192	198	390	144	94	528	0.3	0.3	8.0	8.3	16.3	6.0	3.9	22.0
2010	Brisbane Lions	1	19	9	9	166	118	284	99	50	215	0.5	0.5	8.7	6.2	14.9	5.2	4.6	11.3
2011	Brisbane Lions	1	17	27	13	159	78	237	83	34	82	1.6	0.8	9.4	4.6	14.0	4.9	2.0	4.8
2012	Melbourne	11	11	29	18	108	31	139	53	41	21	2.6	1.6	9.8	2.8	12.6	4.8	3.7	1.9
2013	Melbourne	11	4	7	2	25	10	35	14	6	2	1.8	0.5	6.3	2.5	8.8	3.5	1.5	0.5
2014	Melbourne	11	0	—	—	—	—	—	—	—	—	—	—	—	—	—	—	—	—
2015	Geelong	19	8	14	6	59	28	87	35	16	15	1.8	0.8	7.4	3.5	10.9	4.4	2.0	1.9
2016	Geelong	19	1	0	0	3	7	10	3	3	5	0.0	0.0	3.0	7.0	10.0	3.0	3.0	5.0
Career			106	111	70	842	542	1384	416	264	965	1.1	0.7	8.0	5.1	13.1	4.9	2.5	9.1
