= Bryce Retzlaff =

Australian rules footballer

Personal information
- Full name: Bryce Retzlaff
- Nickname: Retzy
- Born: 29 June 1991 (age 35)
- Original team: Labrador (QAFL)
- Draft: No. 84, 2009 National Draft, Brisbane Lions
- Height: 195 cm (6 ft 5 in)
- Weight: 86 kg (190 lb)
- Position: Forward / Defender

Club information
- Current club: Labrador
- Number: 37

Playing career^{1}
Years	Club	Games (Goals)
2011	Brisbane Lions	11 (6)
- ^{1} Playing statistics correct to the end of 2011.

Career highlights
- VFL premiership player: 2013

Bryce Retzlaff was a professional Australian rules football player at the Brisbane Lions. He was taken at pick No. 84 in the 2010 National Draft, after having played for Labrador in the QAFL. Retzlaff made his debut in QClash 1, the inaugural Queensland derby, against Gold Coast.

After sustaining an ACL injury in 2012, Bryce was delisted from the Brisbane Lions. In 2013, he made his come back to football at the Box Hill Hawks Football Club becoming a premiership player after a VFL grand final win against Geelong. Retzlaff then went on to sign with Central District Football Club as a key forward in both 2014 and 2015.

In 2016, Retzlaff returned to his original club Labrador as captain and retired from the team in 2020.
