= Robert Findlay (umpire) =

Australian rules football umpire

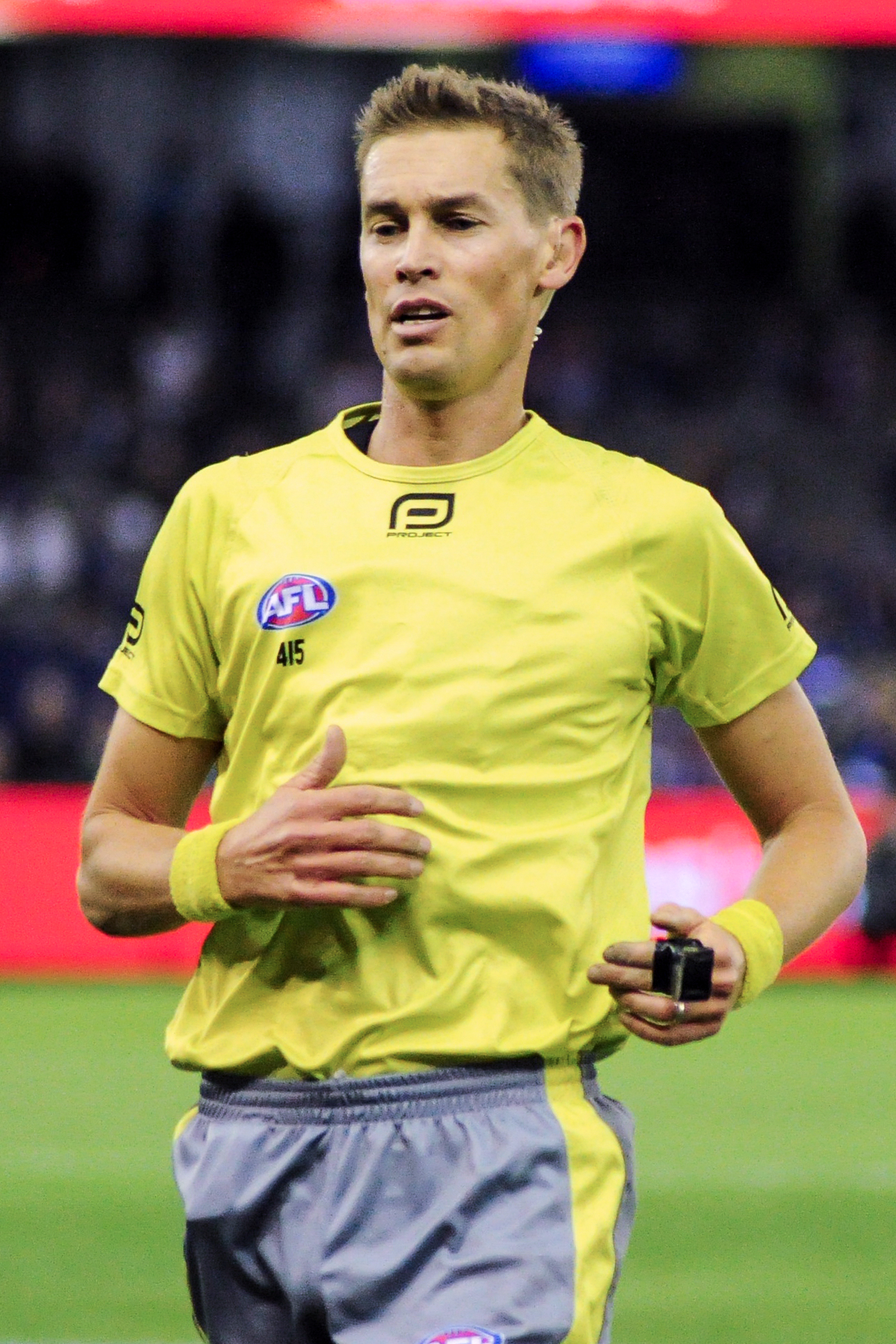
- Findlay in April 2018

Personal information
- Full name: Robert Findlay
- Nickname: Rob
- Height: 183 cm (6 ft 0 in)
- Weight: 70 kg (154 lb)
- Other occupation: Engineer

Umpiring career
Years	League	Role	Games
2009–	AFL	Field umpire	381

Robert Findlay is an Australian rules football umpire currently officiating in the Australian Football League.

He joined the Victorian Football League in 2001, umpiring in the 2008 Grand Final. He was appointed to the AFL list in 2009 and made his debut in Round 4 of that year, in a match between Richmond and Melbourne.
