= Broc McCauley =

Australian rules footballer

Personal information
- Full name: Broc McCauley
- Born: 20 December 1986 (age 39); Southport, Queensland
- Original team: Southport (QAFL)/ Surfers Paradise (Queensland)
- Draft: No. 78, 2010 rookie draft
- Debut: Round 2, 2011, Brisbane Lions vs. Western Bulldogs, at Etihad Stadium
- Height: 202 cm (6 ft 8 in)
- Weight: 98 kg (216 lb)
- Position: Ruckman

Playing career^{1}
| Years | Club | Games (Goals) |
| 2010–2011 | Brisbane Lions | 3 (0) |
| 2012 | Hawthorn | 3 (1) |
| Total | | 6 (1) |
- ^{1} Playing statistics correct to the end of 2012.

Broc McCauley (born 20 December 1986) is a former Australian rules footballer, who played for Hawthorn Football Club and Brisbane Lions Football Club in the Australian Football League (AFL).

== Early life ==
He was a junior sporting standout in cricket, soccer and basketball who, three years earlier, had been an up-and-coming first-division soccer player.

== Soccer career ==
McCauley was listed with the Queensland Roar in 2006 and was an up-and-coming player, reaching their seconds in the Brisbane Premier League playing as a goalkeeper. Frustrated by having to drive from the Gold Coast to Brisbane to play soccer, especially when studying on the Gold Coast, he went back to his one-time junior club to play Australian Rules.

== Australian Rules ==
He started in the Surfers Paradise reserves in the second division, switched to Southport to maximize his competitive opportunities in 2007, and was a senior fixture in the Sharks side in 2007-08-09. In 2007 he played a full season, including 12 senior games, and was the best ruckman on the ground in the '07 QAFL grand final loss to Mt. Gravatt. In 2008 he played in the winning grand final side against Morningside.

He played 20 of a possible 21 games in 2009. He also made his Queensland representative debut against Tasmania in June 2009, was a member of the QAFL Team of the Year, finished equal 7th in the Grogan Medal, and won the club's 'Most Improved Player' award.

== Brisbane Lions career ==
Broc was rookied by Brisbane because of what he did at interstate level which got him noticed by talent scouts on the lookout for new players. McCauley made his debut in Round 2 of the 2011 AFL season against the Western Bulldogs at Etihad Stadium.

McCauley was delisted at the end of the 2011 season.

== Rookie Drafted by Hawthorn ==
McCauley was thrown a lifeline by the Hawks in the 2011 Rookie Draft and was part of Hawthorn's Rookie List for the 2012 AFL season. McCauley was rookie upgraded after Alex Woodward was put on the long-term injury list. McCauley played his first game for the Hawthorn Football Club in Round 1 on 30 March 2012, primary playing on seasoned Ruckman Darren Jolly, acquiring 21 hit outs, 14 possessions and 1 goal, his first in AFL.

McCauley retired from AFL on 30 October 2012, due to ongoing injuries.

== Personal ==
A fully qualified stockbroker who put his career on hold to accept a rookie list contract with the Brisbane Lions in 2010. I can be a stock-broker all my life – I’ll only get one chance to be an AFL footballer, he said.

== Statistics ==
Legend
| G | Goals | K | Kicks | D | Disposals | T | Tackles |
| B | Behinds | H | Handballs | M | Marks | H/O | Hit-outs |

| Season | Team | No. | Games | Totals | | | | | | | | Averages (per game) | | | | | | | | Votes |
| Season | Team | No. | Games | G | B | K | H | D | M | T | H/O | G | B | K | H | D | M | T | H/O | Votes |
|---|---|---|---|---|---|---|---|---|---|---|---|---|---|---|---|---|---|---|---|---|
| 2010 | Brisbane Lions | 46 | 0 | — | — | — | — | — | — | — | — | — | — | — | — | — | — | — | — | 0 |
| 2011 | Brisbane Lions | 46 | 3 | 0 | 0 | 8 | 32 | 40 | 8 | 6 | 62 | 0.0 | 0.0 | 2.7 | 10.7 | 13.3 | 2.7 | 2.0 | 20.7 | 0 |
| 2012 | Hawthorn | 40 | 3 | 1 | 0 | 11 | 23 | 34 | 11 | 7 | 56 | 0.3 | 0.0 | 3.7 | 7.7 | 11.3 | 3.7 | 2.3 | 18.7 | 0 |
| Career | | | 6 | 1 | 0 | 19 | 55 | 74 | 19 | 13 | 118 | 0.2 | 0.0 | 3.2 | 9.2 | 12.3 | 3.2 | 2.2 | 19.7 | 0 |
