= Aaron Cornelius =

Australian rules footballer

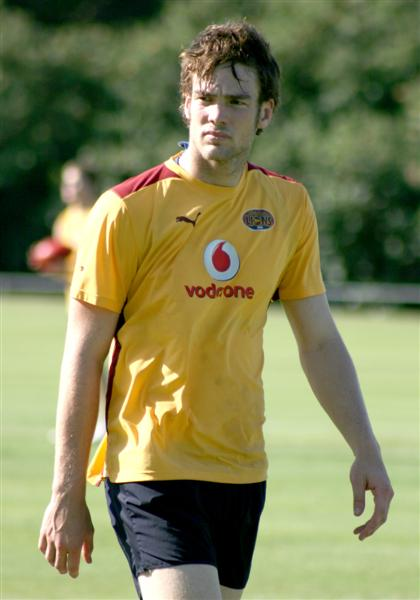
- Aaron Cornelius at Brisbane Lions pre-season training, December 2008.

Personal information
- Full name: Aaron Cornelius
- Nickname: Ace
- Born: 29 May 1990 (age 36); Hobart, Tasmania
- Original team: Tasmanian Devils (VFL)
- Draft: 1. 57, 2008 National Draft, Brisbane Lions
- Height: 192 cm (6 ft 4 in)
- Weight: 86 kg (190 lb)
- Position: Forward

Playing career^{1}
Years	Club	Games (Goals)
2009–2013	Brisbane Lions	25 (35)
- ^{1} Playing statistics correct to the end of 2013.

Career highlights
- NEAFL premiership player: 2012

Aaron Cornelius (born 29 May 1990) is an Australian rules footballer who played for the Brisbane Lions in the Australian Football League (AFL).

He was selected with the Brisbane Lions' fourth selection (pick 57 overall) in the 2008 National Draft.

Cornelius was given the number 44 jumper, previously worn by Brisbane Bears and Brisbane Lions champion Nigel Lappin.

Cornelius was delisted by Brisbane at the end of the 2013 season. He then returned to Tasmania where he was announced as the playing-coach of the Glenorchy Football Club in the Tasmanian State League for the 2014 season.

In 2014, during a game against Clarence at Bellerive Oval, Cornelius suffered an horrific injury during a marking contest where he dislocated his knee and severed blood vessels in his leg which led to fears he would lose the limb.

Cornelius coached the Glenorchy Magpies to a Grand Final win in 2016 after finishing runners up the previous two years.
