= Sam Sheldon =

Australian rules footballer

Personal information
- Full name: Sam Sheldon
- Born: 8 March 1989 (age 37)
- Original team: Oakleigh Chargers (TAC Cup)
- Draft: No. 70, 2006 National Draft, Brisbane Lions
- Height: 183 cm (6 ft 0 in)
- Weight: 79 kg (174 lb)
- Position: Midfielder

Playing career^{1}
Years	Club	Games (Goals)
2009–2012	Brisbane Lions	43 (11)
- ^{1} Playing statistics correct to the end of 2012.

Sam Sheldon (born 8 March 1989) is a former Australian rules footballer who played for the Brisbane Lions in the Australian Football League.

== Early life ==
Sheldon is of Indigenous Australian heritage and his tribal ancestry can be traced to the Wemba-Wemba. He also grew up in Echuca, where he attended St Joseph's College from year 7 and 8.

== Draft ==
Sheldon was drafted to the Brisbane Lions in 2006. He could have opted to be drafted to the Carlton Football Club under the Father–son rule.

== Personal life ==
His father is Ken Sheldon who played for Carlton and then for St Kilda in a career which included three premierships with Carlton in 1979, 1981 and 1982.
