= Patrick Karnezis =

Australian rules footballer

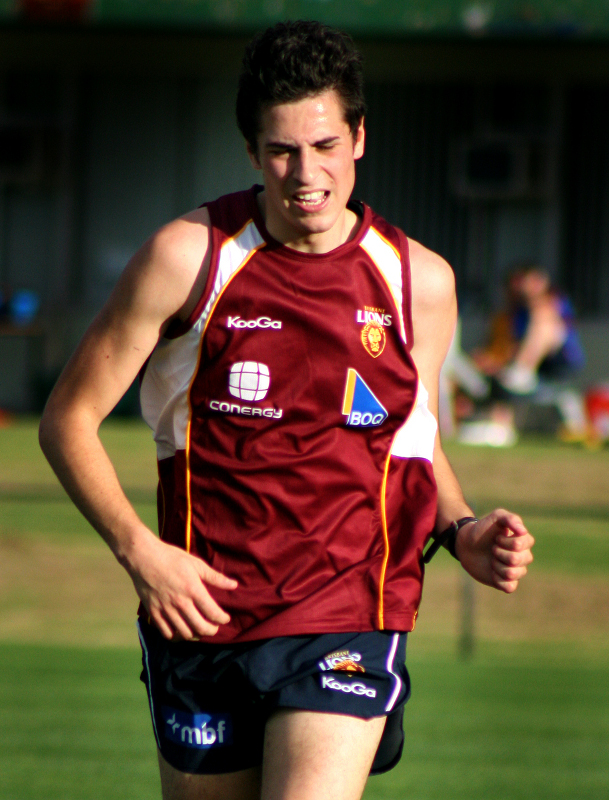
- Karnezis at training in November 2010

Personal information
- Full name: Patrick Karnezis
- Born: 23 April 1992 (age 34); Melbourne, Australia
- Original team: Oakleigh Chargers (TAC Cup)
- Draft: No. 25, 2010 national draft
- Height: 190 cm (6 ft 3 in)
- Weight: 88 kg (194 lb)
- Position: Forward

Playing career^{1}
Years	Club	Games (Goals)
2011–2013	Brisbane Lions	21 (24)
2014–2015	Collingwood	4 (2)
Total		25 (26)
- ^{1} Playing statistics correct to the end of 2015.

Career highlights
- 2x NEAFL premiership player: 2012, 2013

Patrick Karnezis (born 23 April 1992) is a former professional Australian rules footballer who played for the Brisbane Lions and Collingwood Football Club in the Australian Football League (AFL).

After playing junior football for Oakleigh Chargers, Karnezis was taken at pick number 25 in the 2010 national draft by the Brisbane Lions. Karnezis made his debut in round 13 of the 2011 season, against Richmond. On 25 October 2013 he was traded to the Collingwood Football Club in exchange for Jackson Paine. He retired from AFL at the conclusion of the 2015 season.

After his retirement from AFL, Karnezis joined West Preston Lakeside of the Northern Football League (NFL).

== Statistics ==
Legend
G	Goals	K	Kicks	D	Disposals	T	Tackles
B	Behinds	H	Handballs	M	Marks

Season	Team	No.	Games	Totals							Averages (per game)						
Season	Team	No.	Games	G	B	K	H	D	M	T	G	B	K	H	D	M	T
2011	Brisbane Lions	28	11	17	10	65	23	88	40	14	1.5	0.9	5.9	2.1	8.0	3.6	1.3
2012	Brisbane Lions	28	7	7	8	39	18	57	29	14	1.0	1.1	5.6	2.6	8.1	4.1	2.0
2013	Brisbane Lions	28	3	0	4	20	18	38	11	7	0.0	1.3	6.7	6.0	12.7	3.7	2.3
2014	Collingwood	33	0	—	—	—	—	—	—	—	—	—	—	—	—	—	—
2015	Collingwood	33	4	2	0	27	14	41	10	7	0.5	0.0	6.8	3.5	10.3	2.5	1.8
Career			25	26	22	151	73	224	90	42	1.0	0.9	6.0	2.9	9.0	3.6	1.7
