= Jack Redden =

Australian rules football player (born 1990)

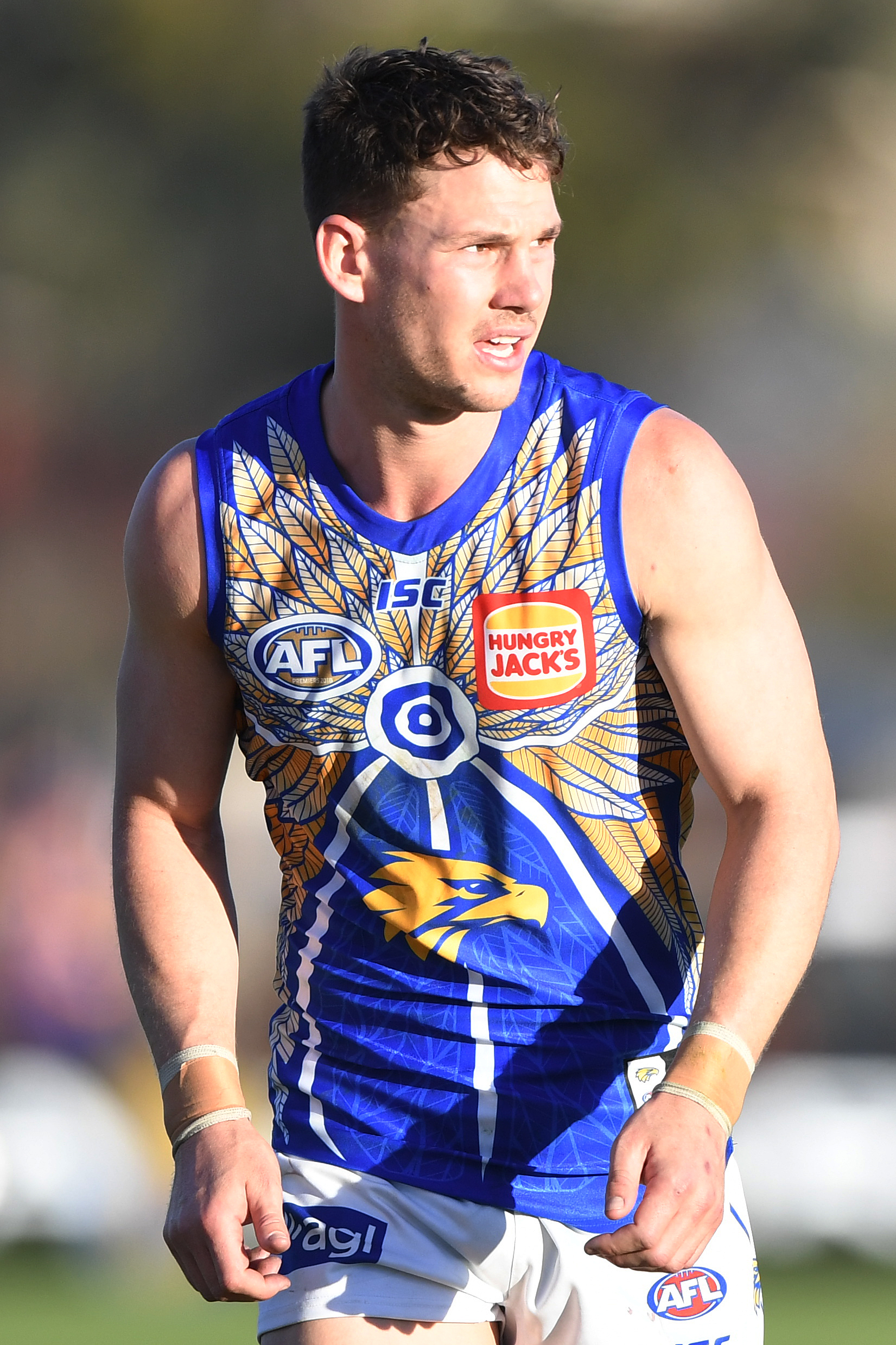
- Redden playing for West Coast in July 2019

Personal information
- Full name: Jack Redden
- Born: 9 December 1990 (age 35)
- Original team: Glenelg (SANFL)
- Draft: No. 25, 2008 national draft
- Height: 190 cm (6 ft 3 in)
- Weight: 85 kg (187 lb)
- Position: Midfielder

Playing career^{1}
Years	Club	Games (Goals)
2009–2015	Brisbane Lions	129 (52)
2016–2022	West Coast	134 (28)
Total		263 (80)
- ^{1} Playing statistics correct to the end of 2022.

Career highlights
- AFL premiership player: 2018; Pre Season Premiership Player 2013; 22under22 team: 2012; AFL Rising Star nominee: 2010

Jack Redden (born 9 December 1990) is a former Australian rules football player who played for the West Coast Eagles and Brisbane Lions in the Australian Football League (AFL).

== Early life ==
Originally from Keith, South Australia, Redden participated in the Auskick program there. He attended Sacred Heart College and played senior football with Glenelg in the SANFL. His brother Tom Redden was once listed as a rookie at the Adelaide Football Club.

Redden was selected with the Brisbane Lions' second selection (pick 25 overall) in the 2008 National Draft.

== AFL career ==
=== 2009 ===
Redden made his senior debut in round 15, 2009 against Geelong, where he kicked one goal. He remained in the Brisbane side for the remainder of the season, including two finals series matches.

=== 2010 ===
Redden was one of few Brisbane players to have played in all 22 game season for the Brisbane Lions in 2010.

Redden was the third player (after Todd Banfield and Tom Rockliff) from the Brisbane Lions to have earned a NAB Rising Star nomination in 2010, an award which recognises the standout performers of the AFL who are of 21 years of age or younger and played 10 games before the conclusion of the current season. Redden ended up losing out to Sydney youngster Dan Hannebery. Redden earned his nomination after what was said to be an "outstanding" performance in a narrow loss against St Kilda.

Alongside his 4 goals, Redden also took 114 marks and had an average of 17 disposals per game. In his second season, he led Brisbane in tackles (with 115) and was ranked third in the club for inside-50s (with 73).

In the end of year Club Champion Award, Redden ended up with a 5th-placed finish with a grand total of 26.5 votes.

=== 2011 ===
2011 has been considered Redden's breakout season, playing some of his best football. Redden's kicked 14 goals in his 22 matches that season. Redden has also had a career-high 32 disposals v Carlton in round 12 and Hawthorn in round 16, a season-high 9 marks v Sydney in round 11 and Collingwood in round 22 and a career-high 13 tackles v Fremantle in round 1 and Port Adelaide in round 15. Redden totalled 166 tackles for the season (ranked 5th for the season and having the 3rd highest average), having the most tackles of players not to have played in the finals. This caused Redden to be ranked 9th on the all-time list of most tackles in a season since statistics for tackles have been counted.

Redden is said to play a crucial role in the current re-building process which the Brisbane Lions team is undertaking. In this reference, Redden is listed alongside Tom Rockliff, Todd Banfield and Daniel Rich who are considered important to the re-building process. Teammate Matthew Leuenberger is also another player who is excited by the future of Redden and co.

Redden played 112 consecutive games from his debut in round 15, 2009 until mid 2014.

Redden was listed to be Brisbane's most underrated player in a club-by-club analysis of the most underrated players by Fox Sports journalists John Clark and Paul Pickering. Redden was noted to "rarely earn the plaudits as peers Daniel Rich and Tom Rockliff".

With club legend Simon Black considered to be on the back-end of his career, Redden was also considered to be one of the players which could take over the role. In an interview after Brisbane's loss to Richmond in round 13, Redden said "it'll be big shoes to fill when Blacky (Simon Black) does leave... but most definitely I would love to take that spot in the team" but yet admits "there's plenty of other boys that have the potential to do that". In the article, Whiting said Redden has a "hunger for the contested footy" and is a "composed young player with strong hands overhead and a great work ethic".

Redden ranked 3rd in the Brisbane best and fairest awards (otherwise known as the Merrett–Murray Medal) in 2011 with 35 votes, finishing only 2.5 votes behind winner Tom Rockliff and half a vote behind runner-up Simon Black. Because of his third-place finish, Redden won the Alistair Lynch trophy. Also, Redden was announced as being the most courageous player for Brisbane in the year, winning him the Shaun Hart Most Courageous Player award.

Redden also polled his first Brownlow Medal vote this year, the award which rewards the AFL's fairest and best player. Redden polled the vote in his 27 disposal, 2 goal and 12 tackle effort v St Kilda in round 5.

=== 2015 ===
Redden was traded to West Coast in October in exchange for pick 17 in the off season.

=== 2018 ===
Redden won his first premiership at the Eagles after defeating Collingwood by 5 points. He placed runner up in the John Worsfold Medal count for the Eagles and was also named player of the finals.

=== 2022 ===
After playing a good season individually for a season that would want to be forgotten for the Eagles, Redden retired from the game after 14 seasons, seven of those being in Eagle colours. He finished his career at the age of 31 playing 263 games.

== Statistics ==
Statistics are correct to the end of round 5, 2019

Legend
G	Goals	K	Kicks	D	Disposals	T	Tackles
B	Behinds	H	Handballs	M	Marks

Jack Redden Career Statistics
Season	Team	No.	Games	Totals							Averages (per game)						
Season	Team	No.	Games	G	B	K	H	D	M	T	G	B	K	H	D	M	T
2009	Brisbane Lions	30	10	6	4	74	64	138	37	35	0.6	0.4	7.4	6.4	13.8	3.7	3.5
2010	Brisbane Lions	30	22	4	11	191	194	385	114	115	0.2	0.5	8.7	8.8	17.5	5.2	5.2
2011	Brisbane Lions	30	22	14	5	284	242	526	119	166	0.6	0.2	12.9	11.0	23.9	5.4	7.5
2012	Brisbane Lions	30	22	11	3	263	286	549	108	142	0.5	0.1	12.0	13.0	25.0	4.9	6.5
2013	Brisbane Lions	30	22	9	7	246	235	481	89	147	0.4	0.3	11.2	10.7	21.9	4.0	6.7
2014	Brisbane Lions	30	14	6	4	188	146	334	71	98	0.4	0.3	13.4	10.4	23.8	5.1	7.0
2015	Brisbane Lions	30	17	2	1	210	191	401	83	103	0.1	0.1	12.4	11.2	23.6	4.9	6.1
2016	West Coast Eagles	8	15	5	4	102	139	241	42	72	0.3	0.3	6.8	9.3	16.1	2.8	4.8
2017	West Coast Eagles	8	19	4	1	187	202	389	87	98	0.2	0.1	9.8	10.6	20.5	4.6	5.2
2018	West Coast Eagles	8	25	10	4	351	277	628	140	118	0.4	0.2	14.0	11.1	25.1	5.6	4.7
2019	West Coast Eagles	8	23	0	4	251	277	528	111	129	0.0	0.2	10.9	12.0	23.0	4.8	5.6
2020	West Coast Eagles	8	13	1	1	98	106	204	46	31	0.1	0.1	7.5	8.2	15.7	3.5	2.4
2021	West Coast Eagles	8	18	3	1	208	235	443	104	71	0.2	0.1	11.6	13.1	24.6	5.8	3.9
2022	West Coast Eagles	8	21	5	1	231	225	456	121	110	0.2	0.1	11.0	10.7	21.7	5.8	5.2
Career			263	80	51	2884	2819	5703	1272	1435	0.3	0.2	11.0	10.7	21.7	4.8	5.5
