= Rohan Bewick =

Australian rules footballer

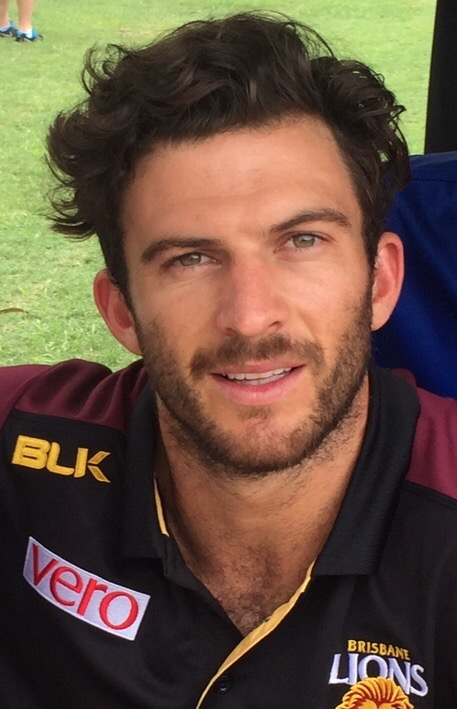
- Bewick with the Brisbane Lions in February 2016

Personal information
- Full name: Rohan Bewick
- Born: 10 October 1989 (age 37)
- Original team: West Perth (WAFL)
- Height: 184 cm (6 ft 0 in)
- Weight: 83 kg (183 lb)
- Position: Midfield / Half-forward

Playing career^{1}
Years	Club	Games (Goals)
2011–2018	Brisbane Lions	103 (71)
- ^{1} Playing statistics correct to the end of 2018.

Rohan Bewick is a former professional Australian rules footballer who played for the Brisbane Lions in the Australian Football League (AFL).

Bewick was recruited by the Lions from West Perth in the West Australian Football League (WAFL), a part of the trade deal that sent Jared Brennan to the Gold Coast Suns. He made his AFL debut in the opening round of the 2011 AFL season.

He is the son of former footballer Corry Bewick, who also played for West Perth, and the nephew of former Essendon player Darren Bewick. He has an identical twin brother, Shaun, who has played for South Fremantle and West Perth.

Bewick was delisted at the end of the 2018 season.
