= Jed Adcock =

Australian rules footballer and coach

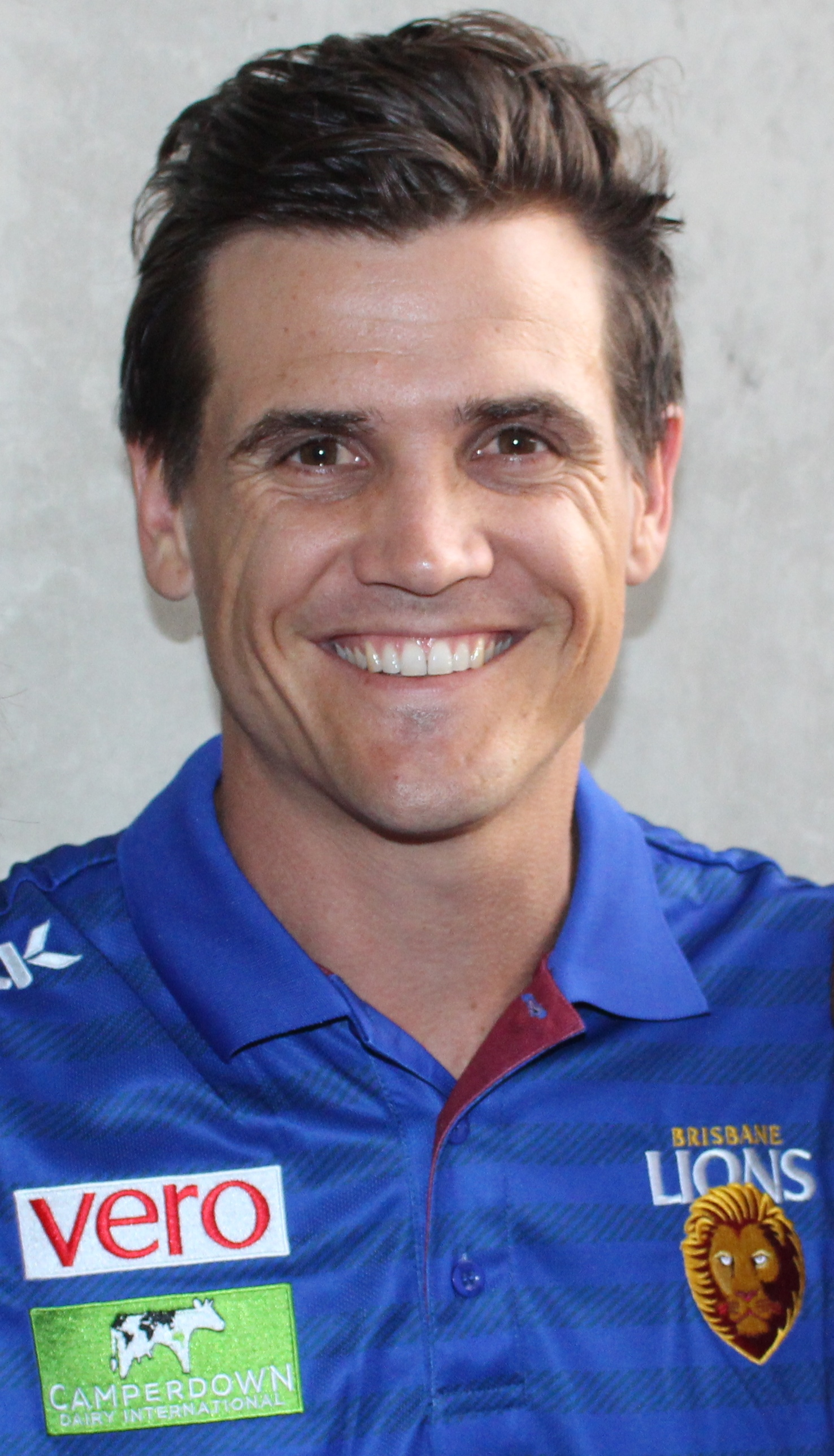
- Adcock in December 2016

Personal information
- Full name: Jed Adcock
- Born: 15 November 1985 (age 41)
- Original team: North Ballarat Rebels (TAC Cup)
- Draft: No. 33, 2003 national draft No. 46, 2016 rookie draft
- Height: 184 cm (6 ft 0 in)
- Weight: 84 kg (185 lb)
- Position: Defender

Club information
- Current club: Brisbane Lions (assistant midfield coach)

Playing career^{1}
Years	Club	Games (Goals)
2004–2015	Brisbane Lions	206 (59)
2016	Western Bulldogs	7 (1)
Total		213 (60)
- ^{1} Playing statistics correct to the end of 2016.

Career highlights
- Brisbane Lions captain (2013–2014); VFL premiership player: 2016

Jed Adcock (born on 15 November 1985) is a former professional Australian rules footballer and current coach who played for the Brisbane Lions and Western Bulldogs in the Australian Football League (AFL). He was co-captain of the Brisbane Lions in 2013 and sole captain in 2014. After moving back to Brisbane in 2017 following separation from his first wife, he became the assistant midfield coach at the Brisbane Lions. He left Brisbane in October 2023 and joined North Melbourne in October 2023, where he is currently serving as the midfield coach.

== AFL career ==
He was recruited as the number 33 draft pick in the 2003 AFL draft from the North Ballarat Rebels. He made his debut for the Brisbane Lions in Round 7, 2004 against North Melbourne.

In 2007, Adcock came second (behind Jonathan Brown) in the best and fairest and was also an all Australian nominee. He was in the top 10 in the AFL for free kicks and was in the top 15 for tackles. He was a defender at the start of 2007 and then became a midfielder for the lions and kicked a career high four goals at the MCG against Collingwood in round 17 when the lions won by 93 points.

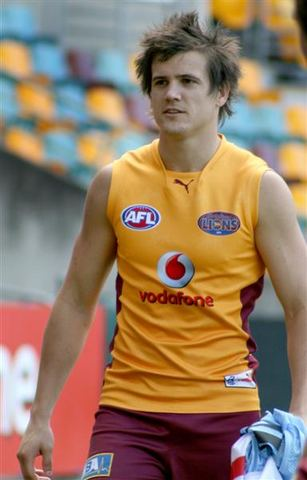
Adcock at a Brisbane Lions public training session in 2008

In 2008, Adcock was appointed as one of four vice captains alongside Simon Black, Luke Power and Daniel Merrett.

Adcock played in the first 15 games of 2009 before getting injured. Scans revealed that the injury was a tibial plateau fracture which kept him off the field for 10–12 weeks. He returned for the second semi final against the Western Bulldogs, and played in his first and only final.

In 2013, he became co-captain of the Lions with Jonathan Brown and in January 2014, became the sole captain. After 1 season in job, Adcock stepped down to a mentor role and Tom Rockliff took over as captain.

In August 2015, he was advised he would not be offered a contract extension for 2016, and was subsequently delisted by Brisbane. He was, however, drafted by the Western Bulldogs in the 2016 rookie draft with the 46th selection.

Adcock played his first game for the Bulldogs in round 4, 2016 against Carlton. In August, he announced he would retire at the end of the season. He did not feature in the club's premiership win in October. Despite missing out on the AFL grand final, he did play in Footscray's 2016 VFL grand final victory.

== Statistics ==
Legend
G	Goals	K	Kicks	D	Disposals	T	Tackles
B	Behinds	H	Handballs	M	Marks

Season	Team	No.	Games	Totals							Averages (per game)						
Season	Team	No.	Games	G	B	K	H	D	M	T	G	B	K	H	D	M	T
2004	Brisbane Lions	7	2	2	2	6	7	13	4	2	1.0	1.0	3.0	3.5	6.5	2.0	1.0
2005	Brisbane Lions	7	22	4	2	160	117	277	93	49	0.2	0.1	7.3	5.3	12.6	4.2	2.2
2006	Brisbane Lions	7	8	1	1	98	49	147	50	27	0.1	0.1	12.3	6.1	18.4	6.3	3.4
2007	Brisbane Lions	7	22	10	1	277	178	455	98	109	0.5	0.0	12.6	8.1	20.7	4.5	5.0
2008	Brisbane Lions	7	21	6	4	175	170	345	75	95	0.3	0.2	8.3	8.1	16.4	3.6	4.5
2009	Brisbane Lions	7	16	4	1	162	152	314	79	68	0.3	0.1	10.1	9.5	19.6	4.9	4.3
2010	Brisbane Lions	7	9	2	1	73	66	139	39	22	0.2	0.1	8.1	7.3	15.4	4.3	2.4
2011	Brisbane Lions	7	20	5	2	252	150	402	117	70	0.3	0.1	12.6	7.5	20.1	5.9	3.5
2012	Brisbane Lions	7	21	3	2	244	160	404	104	85	0.1	0.1	11.6	7.6	19.2	5.0	4.0
2013	Brisbane Lions	7	22	2	3	290	153	443	93	92	0.1	0.1	13.2	7.0	20.1	4.2	4.2
2014	Brisbane Lions	7	22	3	0	265	142	407	87	63	0.1	0.0	12.0	6.5	18.5	4.0	2.9
2015	Brisbane Lions	7	21	17	10	148	110	258	92	67	0.8	0.5	7.0	5.2	12.2	4.4	3.2
2016	Western Bulldogs	44	7	1	1	50	51	101	24	14	0.1	0.1	7.1	7.3	14.3	3.4	2.0
Career			213	60	30	2200	1505	3705	955	763	0.3	0.1	10.3	7.1	17.4	4.5	3.6

== Personal life ==
Adcock separated from wife Hayley Opel in 2017. He is now married to Amber Ward.

He has four children, two with Opel and two with Ward.

Adcock resides in Brisbane's western suburbs.
