= Niall McKeever =

Australian rules footballer

Personal information
- Full name: Niall McKeever
- Born: 16 February 1989 (age 37); Portglenone Co Antrim
- Original team: Antrim (GAA)
- Draft: No. 67, 2010 Rookie draft, Brisbane Lions
- Height: 197 cm (6 ft 6 in)
- Weight: 95 kg (209 lb)
- Position: Defender

Playing career^{1}
Years	Club	Games (Goals)
2010–2013	Brisbane Lions	22 (2)
- ^{1} Playing statistics correct to the end of 2013.

Career highlights
- 2x NEAFL premiership player: 2012, 2013

Niall McKeever (born 16 February 1989) is a former professional Australian rules football player. He was taken at pick #67 in the 2010 Rookie draft, after having played Gaelic football for the Antrim county team. McKeever made his debut in Round 14, 2011 against Fremantle.

He was delisted by the Lions following the conclusion of the 2013 season.

== Peil Star video ==
In 2016, McKeever appeared in a street Gaelic football film created by Peil Star with Kieran Hughes (Monaghan), Richie Donnelly (Tyrone) and Ryan McHugh (Donegal). The film was shot at Belfast's Titanic Quarter.
