= Jesse O'Brien (footballer) =

Australian rules footballer

Personal information
- Full name: Jesse O'Brien
- Born: 13 February 1991 (age 35)
- Original team: North Adelaide (SANFL)
- Draft: No. 73, 2010 National Draft, Brisbane Lions
- Height: 184 cm (6 ft 0 in)
- Weight: 81 kg (179 lb)
- Position: Midfielder

Playing career^{1}
Years	Club	Games (Goals)
2010–2013	Brisbane Lions	17 (4)
- ^{1} Playing statistics correct to the end of 2013.

Jesse O'Brien (born 13 February 1991) is an Australian rules footballer who played for the Brisbane Lions in the Australian Football League (AFL).

After playing junior football at the Payneham Norwood Union Football Club, O'Brien was recruited from North Adelaide Football Club. He was selected with the Brisbane Lions' third selection (pick 73 overall) in the 2009 National Draft. O'Brien played two pre-season matches for the Lions and spent the first half of 2010 playing for the Lions reserves team. He made his AFL debut in round 14 against Carlton, after showing more consistency for the reserves. However, O'Brien was dropped the following week and he failed to play another AFL match for the rest of the 2010 season.
