= Ryan Lester =

Australian rules footballer

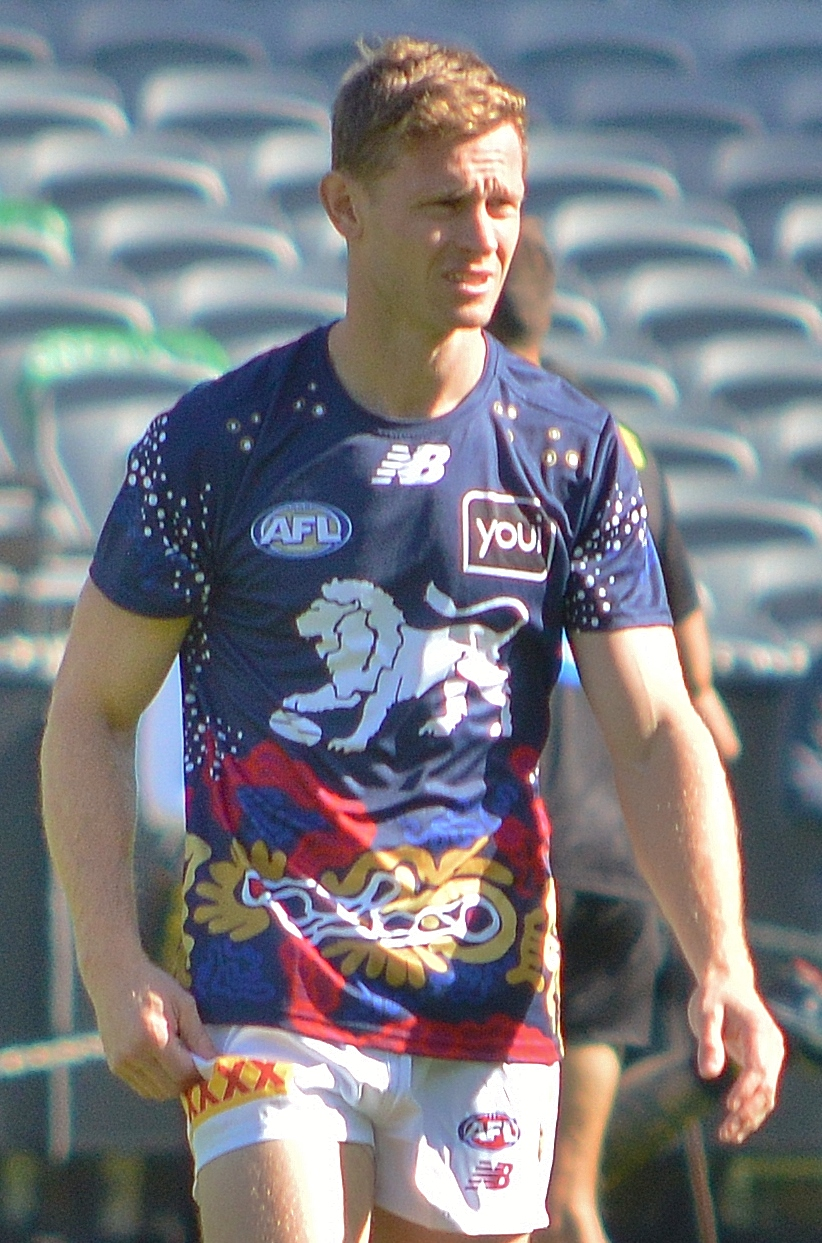
- Lester in April 2025

Personal information
- Full name: Ryan Lester
- Nicknames: Froggy, Moe
- Born: 26 August 1992 (age 34)
- Original team: Oakleigh Chargers (TAC Cup)
- Draft: No. 28, 2010 national draft
- Debut: Round 1, 2011, Brisbane Lions vs. Fremantle, at the Gabba
- Height: 191 cm (6 ft 3 in)
- Weight: 85 kg (187 lb)
- Position: Defender

Club information
- Current club: Brisbane Lions
- Number: 35

Playing career^{1}
Years	Club	Games (Goals)
2011–	Brisbane Lions	256 (49)
- ^{1} Playing statistics correct to the end of 2026.

Career highlights
- 3× AFL premiership player: 2024, 2025, 2026

Ryan Lester (born 26 August 1992) is an Australian rules footballer who plays for the Brisbane Lions in the Australian Football League (AFL).

== Early life ==
Ryan attended Glen Waverley Secondary College in Melbourne's Eastern suburbs.

== AFL career ==
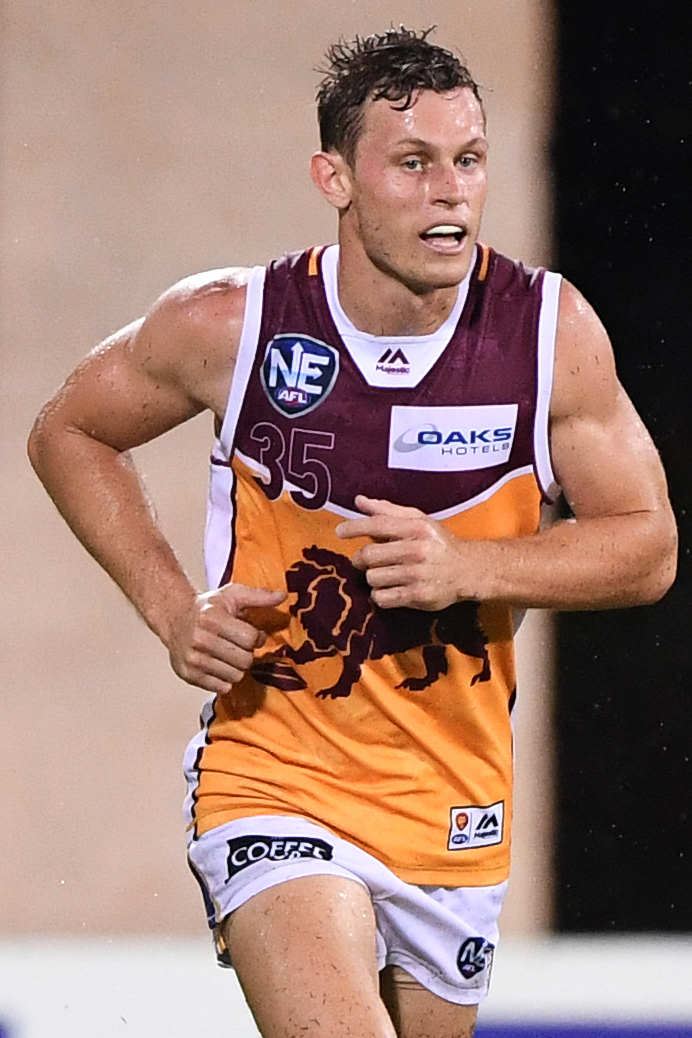
Lester playing for the Brisbane Lions in April 2019

Lester was selected with the 28th pick in the 2010 AFL draft. He made his debut in Round 1 of the 2011 AFL season against the Fremantle Dockers. Lester injured his lisfranc ligament, which is the ligament that stabilises the first and second metatarsal bones, against the Melbourne Demons in round 3. Lester did not play again for that season.

In his 2nd season with the Lions, Lester was named in the squad 18 times throughout the season. In round 6, 2012, Lester finished with a career high 27 disposals in Brisbane's 115–55 loss against the Swans.

In 2014, Lester signed a two-year extension to stay with the Lions.

In 2017, under the clubs first season with Chris Fagan as head coach, Lester played all 22 games for the first and only time in his career

Lester was offered ongoing 1-year contracts from 2019 until 2022. At the conclusion of the 2022 season, Lester was delisted. However, Fagan brought the defender back in the 2022 rookie draft, and made him captain of the Lions VFL team.

Lester was not given a game in the Lions squad until round 7, when an injury to teammate Darcy Gardiner gave the defender an opportunity back in the squad. Lester was again dropped in round 11, but would later return to the Lions best 22 in round 14. After his return to the squad, Lester had a career best year. Midway through the 2023 season, Lester signed a one-year contract with Brisbane, keeping him at the Lions until the end of the 2024 season. Lester played in the Lions 2023 Grand Final loss to the Magpies.

Lester was part of the Brisbane Lions 2024 premiership-winning team, a 60-point victory over the Sydney Swans. He would go on to win two more premierships in 2025 and 2026, completing a hat-trick of premierships.

== Personal life ==
Ryan is married to Emi Lester (née Zorko), sister of teammate and former Lions captain Dayne Zorko. The couple married on 13 October 2018. Together they have two children: a son named Romeo, born on 8 August 2020, and a daughter named Georgie, born on 21 May 2022.

Lester completed a Bachelor of Business, majoring in Finance through Swinburne.

== Statistics ==
Updated to the end of round 22, 2026.

Legend
G	Goals	K	Kicks	D	Disposals	T	Tackles
B	Behinds	H	Handballs	M	Marks
#	Played in that season's premiership team

Season	Team	No.	Games	Totals							Averages (per game)							Votes
Season	Team	No.	Games	G	B	K	H	D	M	T	G	B	K	H	D	M	T	Votes
2011	Brisbane Lions	35	3	2	1	15	22	37	11	1	0.7	0.3	5.0	7.3	12.3	3.7	0.3	0
2012	Brisbane Lions	35	19	3	4	168	120	288	77	30	0.2	0.2	8.8	6.3	15.2	4.1	1.6	0
2013	Brisbane Lions	35	16	4	5	122	147	269	46	41	0.3	0.3	7.6	9.2	16.8	2.9	2.6	0
2014	Brisbane Lions	35	14	3	1	116	148	264	49	65	0.2	0.1	8.3	10.6	18.9	3.5	4.6	0
2015	Brisbane Lions	35	9	8	2	60	60	120	38	21	0.9	0.2	6.7	6.7	13.3	4.2	2.3	0
2016	Brisbane Lions	35	19	11	9	111	113	224	63	50	0.6	0.5	5.8	5.9	11.8	3.3	2.6	0
2017	Brisbane Lions	35	22	14	8	198	159	357	117	63	0.6	0.4	9.0	7.2	16.2	5.3	2.9	1
2018	Brisbane Lions	35	15	0	2	133	107	240	69	40	0.0	0.1	8.9	7.1	16.0	4.6	2.7	0
2019	Brisbane Lions	35	9	0	0	81	27	108	32	30	0.0	0.0	9.0	3.0	12.0	3.6	3.3	0
2020 (Note: The 2020 season was played with 17 home-and-away matches per team (down from 22) and 16-minute quarters with time on (down from 20-minute quarters with time on) due to the impact of the COVID-19 pandemic.)	Brisbane Lions	35	15	0	1	107	70	177	62	35	0.0	0.1	7.1	4.7	11.8	4.1	2.3	0
2021	Brisbane Lions	35	17	1	0	112	86	198	72	32	0.1	0.0	6.6	5.1	11.6	4.2	1.9	0
2022	Brisbane Lions	35	3	0	0	16	9	25	4	6	0.0	0.0	5.3	3.0	8.3	1.3	2.0	0
2023	Brisbane Lions	35	19	1	1	197	71	268	119	38	0.1	0.1	10.4	3.7	14.1	6.3	2.0	0
2024^{#}	Brisbane Lions	35	27	0	1	289	99	388	175	48	0.0	0.0	10.7	3.7	14.4	6.5	1.8	0
2025^{#}	Brisbane Lions	35	26	1	0	223	110	333	142	51	0.0	0.0	8.6	4.2	12.8	5.5	2.0	0
2026^{#}	Brisbane Lions	35	23	1	0	183	82	265	122	25	0.1	0.0	10.8	4.8	15.6	7.2	1.5	0
Career			256	49	35	2131	1430	3561	1198	576	0.2	0.1	8.5	5.7	14.2	4.8	2.3	1
