= Jared Polec =

Australian rules footballer

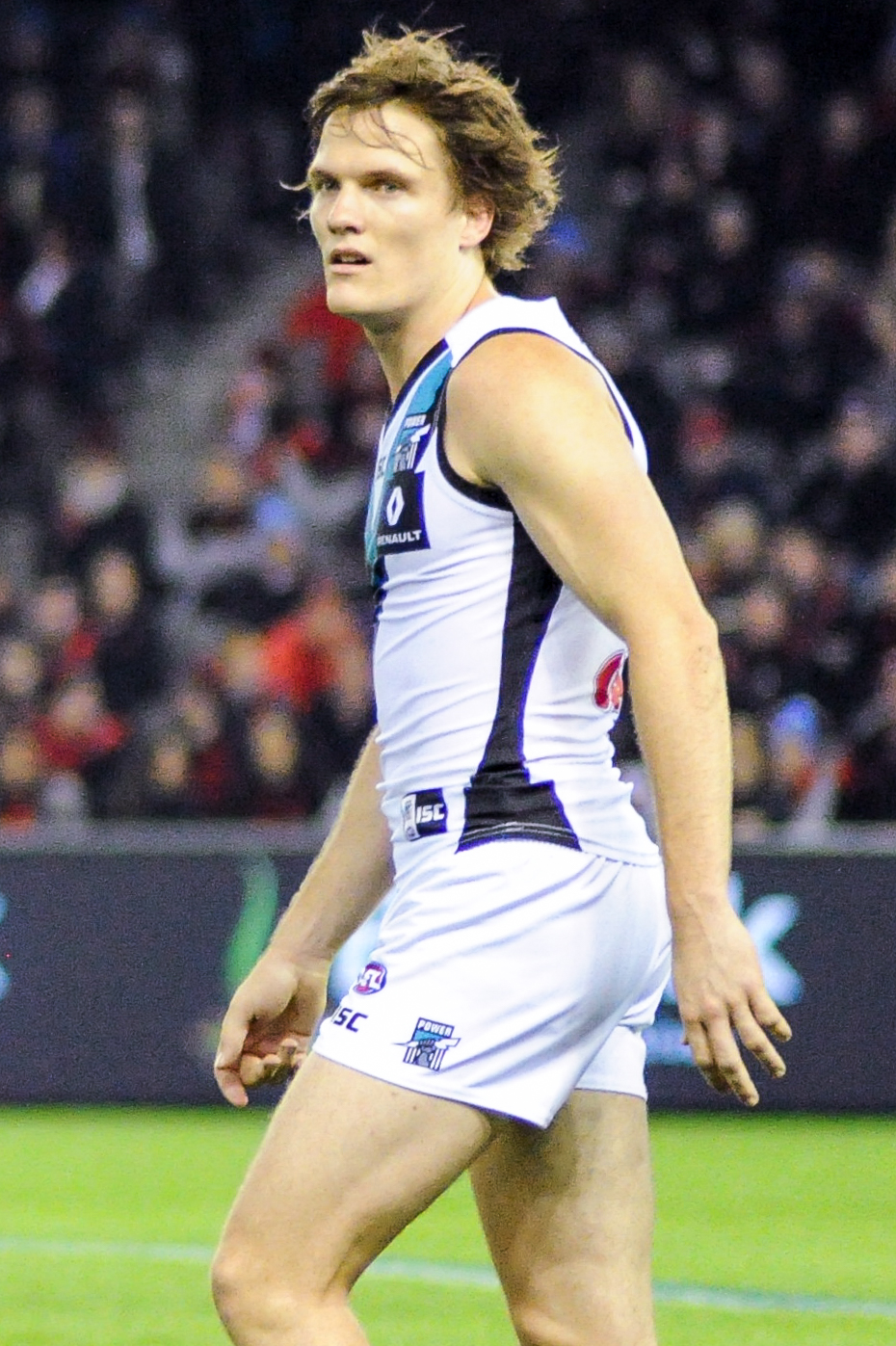
- Polec playing for Port Adelaide in June 2017

Personal information
- Full name: Jared Polec
- Born: 12 October 1992 (age 34); Adelaide, South Australia
- Original teams: Woodville-West Torrens (SANFL), Seaton Ramblers
- Draft: No. 5, 2010 national draft
- Height: 187 cm (6 ft 2 in)
- Weight: 84 kg (185 lb)
- Position: Midfielder

Playing career^{1}
Years	Club	Games (Goals)
2011–2013	Brisbane Lions	16 (9)
2014–2018	Port Adelaide	90 (46)
2019–2022	North Melbourne	42 (20)
Total		148 (75)
- ^{1} Playing statistics correct to the end of 2022.

Jared Polec (born 12 October 1992) is a former Australian rules footballer who played for the North Melbourne Football Club, Port Adelaide and Brisbane Lions in the Australian Football League (AFL).

He was selected with the Brisbane Lions' first selection (pick 5 overall) in the 2010 national draft from SANFL club, Woodville-West Torrens.

Of Polish descent, Polec was an outside midfielder who, prior to being drafted, played senior football with Woodville West Torrens and was a key player in their 2010 finals series. Woodville-West Torrens coach Michael Godden described Polec as being "as good a junior as I've seen come through the system" and praised him for his skill, composure and work ethic.

Polec missed games for both Port Adelaide and North Melbourne due to a recurrent injury to his foot.

== AFL career ==
=== Brisbane Lions (2011–2013) ===
Polec was selected in the initial extended squad for the Lions in round 2 in the 2011 season, but was left out of the final team. He made his AFL debut against Melbourne in round 3. In his first three seasons at Brisbane, he played in sixteen games. In September 2013, Polec requested a trade to a South Australian team, and in October, he nominated Port Adelaide as his preferred club of destination.

=== Port Adelaide (2014–2018) ===
Polec officially joined Port Adelaide in October 2013. Polec had an immediate impact at Port Adelaide, achieving a career-high thirty disposals in round 7 against Greater Western Sydney.

2015 was not to be for Polec, suffering a stress reaction in his foot which developed into a navicular fracture, forcing him out for the season. In early 2016, scans cleared Polec of the fracture and he was declared fit to resume full training. On 13 September 2018, Polec advised Port Adelaide that he wished to be traded to North Melbourne.

=== North Melbourne (2019–2022) ===
In October 2018, Polec was traded to North Melbourne on a five-year contract for seasons 2019 to 2023, however was delisted after the 2022 season following an ongoing foot injury that kept him out of the team throughout 2022.

== Post-AFL career ==
In September 2023, Polec was appointed as head coach of Hoppers Crossing Football Club in the Western Region Football League, on a two-year contract.
