= Mitch Golby =

Australian rules footballer

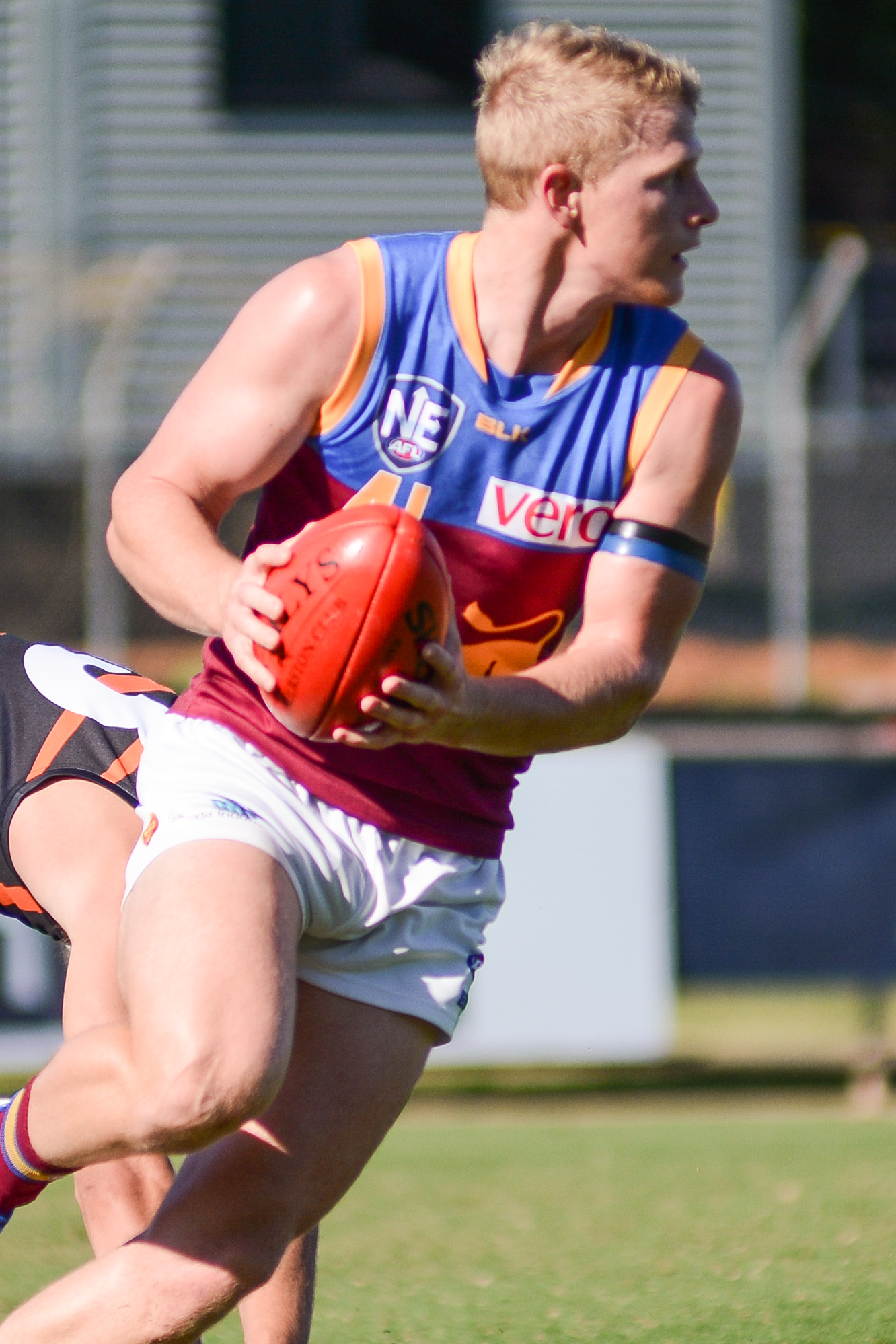
- Golby playing for Brisbane reserves in July 2015

Personal information
- Full name: Mitchell Golby
- Born: 3 October 1991 (age 35)
- Original team: Gippsland Power (TAC Cup)
- Draft: No. 16, 2010 rookie draft
- Height: 183 cm (6 ft 0 in)
- Weight: 161 kg (355 lb)
- Position: Defender

Club information
- Current club: Brisbane Lions
- Number: 41

Playing career^{1}
Years	Club	Games (Goals)
2011–2015	Brisbane Lions	56 (6)
- ^{1} Playing statistics correct to the end of 2015.

Career highlights
- 2012 AFL Rising Star nominee; NEAFL premiership player: 2013

Mitchell "Dragon" Golby (born 3 October 1991) is a former professional Australian rules footballer who played for the Brisbane Lions in the Australian Football League (AFL). He was drafted by the Brisbane Lions with their first selection and sixteenth overall in the 2010 rookie draft, after having played for Gippsland Power in the TAC Cup. He looked almost certain to represent Victoria Country in the 2009 AFL Under 18 Championships but tore his ACL in a trial match.

Golby made his debut in the sixty-one point loss against Carlton at Etihad Stadium in round 12, 2011. In his sixteenth match, he recorded twenty-four disposals, eight marks and four tackles in the ninety-two point win against Greater Western Sydney at the Gabba in round 8, 2012, and he was rewarded with the round nomination for the Rising Star. He played a total of 56 games between 2011 and 2015. In his final season in 2015, he managed only five matches, and was subsequently delisted.
