= Todd Banfield =

Australian rules football player

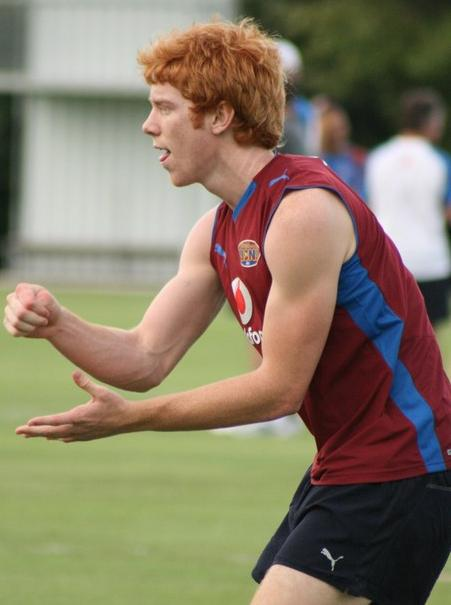
- Banfield at training in December 2008

Personal information
- Full name: Todd Banfield
- Born: 28 June 1990 (age 36); Perth, Western Australia
- Original team: Swan Districts
- Draft: 41st overall, 2008
- Height: 183 cm (6 ft 0 in)
- Weight: 83 kg (183 lb)
- Position: Follower

Playing career^{1}
| Years | Club | Games (Goals) |
| 2009–2013 | Brisbane Lions | 53 (57) |
| 2014 | Richmond | 0(0) |
| Total | | 53 (57) |

International team honours
| Years | Team | Games (Goals) |
| 2010 | Australia | 2 (4) |
- ^{1} Playing statistics correct to the end of 2013.

Career highlights
- 2010 AFL Rising Star nominee

Todd Banfield (born 28 June 1990) is an Australian rules football player who played in the Australian Football League (AFL). Banfield played 53 games for the Brisbane Lions between 2010 and 2013 and joined Richmond in 2014, before being delisted after one season.

He was selected with the Brisbane Lions' third selection (pick 41 overall) in the 2008 National Draft. He was recruited from Swan Districts in the West Australian Football League (WAFL).

== AFL career ==
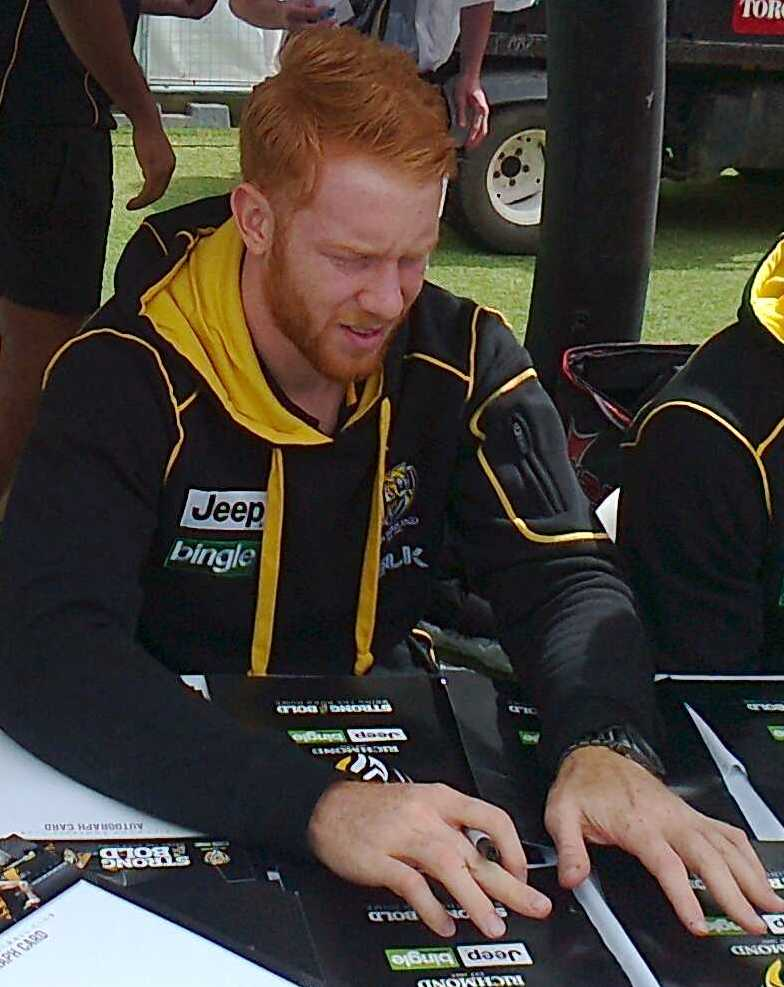
Banfield signing autographs in 2014

Banfield made his debut for Brisbane in the first round of the 2010 season.

In round 6 Banfield received an AFL Rising Star nomination when he kicked a career best three goals.

In the 2010 season Banfield was one of the few Lions to play every match. He finished the season as the third highest goal scorer (27) for the club, only behind Jonathan Brown (53) and Brendan Fevola (48).

At the end of the 2013 season Banfield was delisted from Brisbane without playing an AFL match for the entire year. He was subsequently picked up by Richmond for pick 11 in the 2014 Rookie Draft.

Richmond announced that he was delisted on 9 September 2014, along with seven other players.

== International career ==
Banfield was included in the 22-man squad that travelled to Ireland to represent Australia in the 2010 International Rules series.

== Honours ==
Australia

- Cormac McAnallen Cup 2010 winner
