= Daniel Merrett =

Australian rules footballer

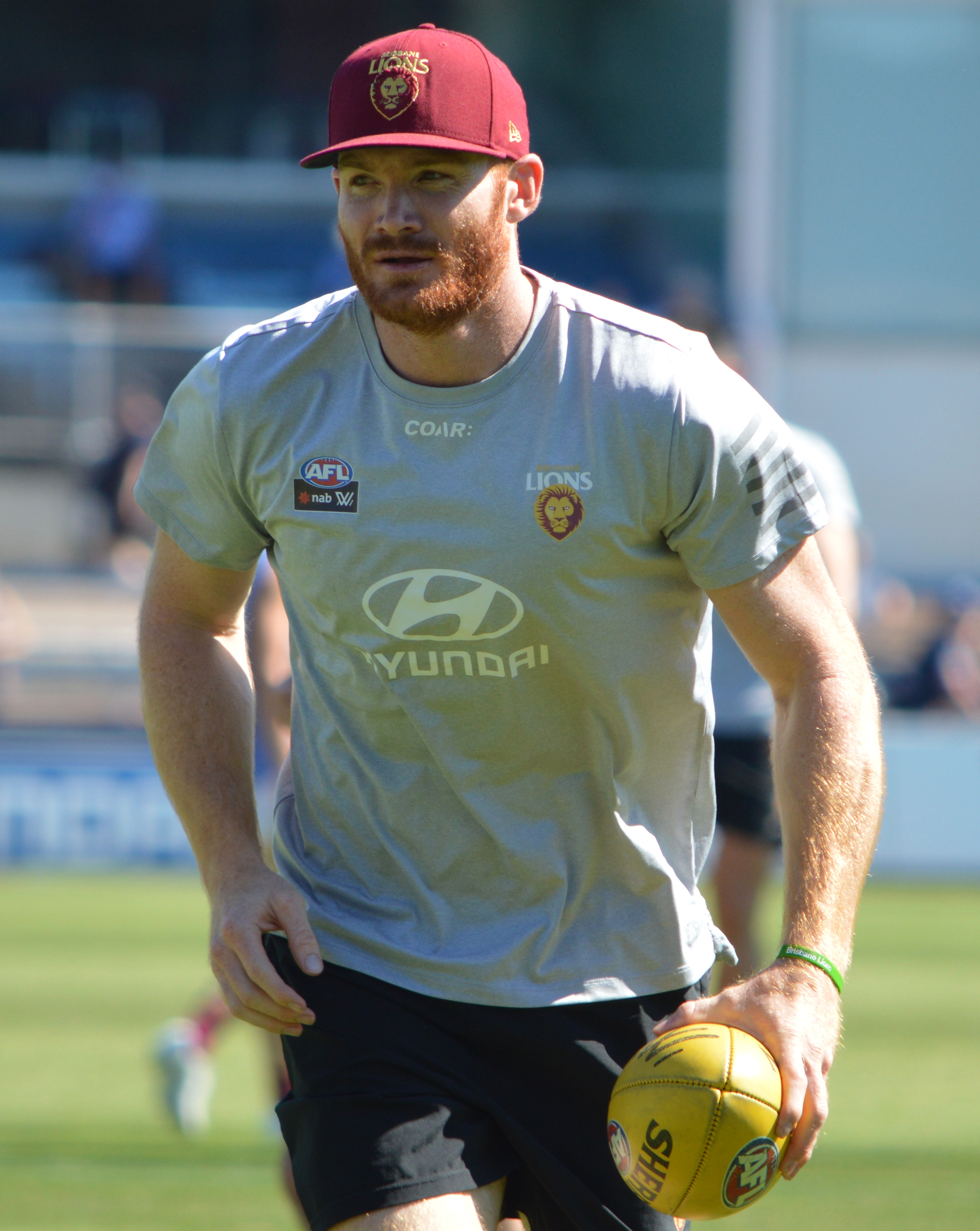
- Merrett in March 2017

Personal information
- Full name: Daniel Merrett
- Nickname: Sauce
- Born: 12 December 1984 (age 41); Adelaide, South Australia, Australia
- Original team: Southport (QAFL)
- Draft: No. 30, 2002 national draft
- Height: 195 cm (6 ft 5 in)
- Weight: 103 kg (227 lb)
- Position: Defender

Club information
- Current club: Brisbane Lions (women's forwards coach)

Playing career^{1}
Years	Club	Games (Goals)
2003–2016	Brisbane Lions	200 (70)

Coaching career^{3}
Years	Club	Games (W–L–D)
2020	Brisbane (women's)	1 (0–0–1)
- ^{1} Playing statistics correct to the end of 2016.^{3} Coaching statistics correct as of round 3, 2020.

Daniel Merrett (born 12 December 1984) is a former professional Australian rules footballer who played for the Brisbane Lions in the Australian Football League (AFL).

== Early life ==
Merrett was born in Adelaide, but moved to the Gold Coast with his family at a young age. A talented schoolboy rugby league player for Benowa State High School, he was identified as a potential Australian rules footballer by AFL Queensland junior development scouts due to his imposing frame and ball-handling skills, and was groomed as a key forward with the Surfers Paradise Demons and later Southport Sharks. He was recruited by the Brisbane Lions with the number 30 draft pick in the 2002 AFL draft but took several years to develop sufficiently to make his debut.

== AFL career ==
Merrett made his AFL debut in Round 2, 2005 against Port Adelaide. He joined the Lions leadership group in 2009.

In August 2016, he announced he would retire from the AFL at the end of the season.

Merrett went on to work in the Lions sales and marketing department and was an assistant coach of the Lions' AFL Women's team for four seasons from 2017 to 2020. He coached a game against Gold Coast in round three of the 2020 season when regular head coach Craig Starcevich was hospitalised. The game ended in a draw.

In 2024 Merrett worked as an assistant coach for Port Adelaide’s AFLW team. In December 2025 the club announced that Merrett had been appointed as its new Head of AFLW going into the 2026 season.

Merrett was inducted into the Queensland Football Hall of Fame in 2023.

== Positions ==
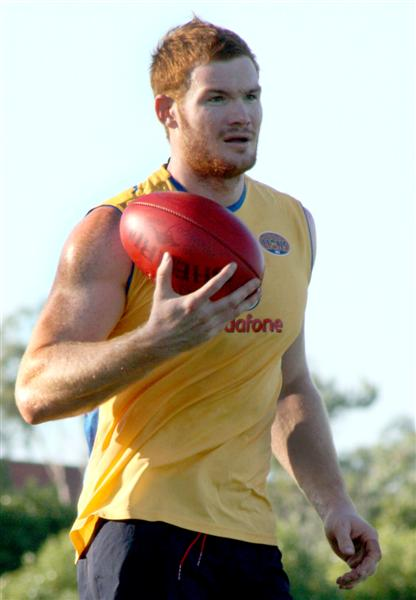
Merrett in December 2008

Daniel Merrett used to play as a full forward, centre half forward or half forward flank in his early career but eventually regularly played as a fullback. He was the defender with the most spoils in the 2007 season.

== Statistics ==
Legend
G	Goals	K	Kicks	D	Disposals	T	Tackles
B	Behinds	H	Handballs	M	Marks

Season	Team	No.	Games	Totals							Averages (per game)						
Season	Team	No.	Games	G	B	K	H	D	M	T	G	B	K	H	D	M	T
2005	Brisbane Lions	21	15	13	9	48	43	91	40	19	0.9	0.6	3.2	2.9	6.1	2.7	1.3
2006	Brisbane Lions	21	9	3	3	28	31	59	25	18	0.3	0.3	3.1	3.4	6.6	2.8	2.0
2007	Brisbane Lions	21	22	0	0	110	90	200	89	27	0.0	0.0	5.0	4.1	9.1	4.0	1.2
2008	Brisbane Lions	21	22	0	0	101	102	203	83	28	0.0	0.0	4.6	4.6	9.2	3.8	1.3
2009	Brisbane Lions	21	19	1	0	100	115	215	82	26	0.1	0.0	5.3	6.1	11.3	4.3	1.4
2010	Brisbane Lions	21	16	0	0	93	84	177	78	40	0.0	0.0	5.8	5.3	11.1	4.9	2.5
2011	Brisbane Lions	21	10	0	0	88	57	145	54	22	0.0	0.0	8.8	5.7	14.5	5.4	2.2
2012	Brisbane Lions	21	22	26	13	191	100	291	113	63	1.2	0.6	8.7	4.5	13.2	5.1	2.9
2013	Brisbane Lions	21	17	14	8	131	78	209	84	28	0.8	0.5	7.7	4.6	12.3	4.9	1.6
2014	Brisbane Lions	21	19	12	8	105	78	183	71	24	0.6	0.4	5.5	4.1	9.6	3.7	1.3
2015	Brisbane Lions	21	10	0	0	69	42	111	52	9	0.0	0.0	6.9	4.2	11.1	5.2	0.9
2016	Brisbane Lions	21	19	1	0	96	76	172	57	32	0.1	0.0	5.1	4.0	9.1	3.0	1.7
Career			200	70	41	1160	896	2056	828	336	0.4	0.2	5.8	4.5	10.3	4.1	1.7
