= List of AFL debuts in 2010 =

A total of sixty-four players have made their Australian Football League (AFL) debut in a senior AFL match to date during the 2010 AFL season. In addition to those players making their AFL-level debuts, twenty-eight players have made their debuts following a trade or re-drafting are also listed below in a separate table.

A senior AFL match is an Australian rules football match between two clubs that are, or have been in the past, members of the AFL. A senior AFL match is played under the laws of Australian football, and includes regular season matches, as well as finals series matches. It does not include pre-season competition matches, interstate matches or international rules football matches. The list is arranged in the order in which each player made his debut for a club in a senior AFL match. Where more than one player made his debut in the same match, those players are listed alphabetically by surname.

== AFL debuts ==
Players are listed in order of debut, and statistics are for AFL regular season and finals series matches during the 2010 AFL season only. Players marked "(rookie)" are players who were elevated from their clubs' rookie-list to the senior list, and therefore were eligible to represent the club in a senior AFL match.

| Order | Name | Club | Age at debut | Debut | Games (2010) | Goals (2010) |
|---|---|---|---|---|---|---|
| 1 | Dustin Martin | Richmond | 18 years, 272 days | Round 1 | 21 | 11 |
| 2 | Ben Nason | Richmond | 20 years, 295 days | Round 1 | 19 | 14 |
| 3 | Relton Roberts | Richmond | 24 years, 24 days | Round 1 | 2 | 0 |
| 4 | Mitch Duncan | Geelong | 18 years, 289 days | Round 1 | 8 | 8 |
| 5 | Ben Howlett | Essendon | 21 years, 156 days | Round 1 | 15 | 6 |
| 6 | Tom Scully | Melbourne | 18 years, 316 days | Round 1 | 21 | 5 |
| 7 | James Strauss | Melbourne | 19 years, 286 days | Round 1 | 2 | 0 |
| 8 | Jack Trengove | Melbourne | 18 years, 206 days | Round 1 | 18 | 8 |
| 9 | Jarrod Kayler-Thomson | Hawthorn | 24 years, 244 days | Round 1 | 3 | 1 |
| 10 | Carl Peterson | Hawthorn | 22 years, 267 days | Round 1 | 17 | 13 |
| 11 | Lewis Jetta | Sydney | 19 years, 48 days | Round 1 | 21 | 7 |
| 12 | Todd Banfield | Brisbane Lions | 19 years, 272 days | Round 1 | 22 | 27 |
| 13 | Luke Shuey | West Coast | 19 years, 298 days | Round 1 | 6 | 6 |
| 14 | Mitch Banner | Port Adelaide | 19 years, 296 days | Round 1 | 10 | 5 |
| 15 | Cameron Hitchcock | Port Adelaide | 19 years, 268 days | Round 1 | 17 | 20 |
| 16 | Andrew Moore | Port Adelaide | 18 years, 302 days | Round 1 | 7 | 0 |
| 17 | Jackson Trengove | Port Adelaide | 19 years, 146 days | Round 1 | 19 | 3 |
| 18 | Ryan Bastinac | North Melbourne | 18 years, 279 days | Round 1 | 22 | 7 |
| 19 | Michael Barlow | Fremantle | 22 years, 100 days | Round 1 | 13 | 15 |
| 20 | Anthony Morabito | Fremantle | 18 years, 150 days | Round 1 | 23 | 13 |
| 21 | Alex Silvagni | Fremantle | 22 years, 185 days | Round 1 | 15 | 4 |
| 22 | Tony Armstrong | Adelaide | 20 years, 180 days | Round 1 | 9 | 0 |
| 23 | Will Young | Adelaide | 19 years, 244 days | Round 2 | 2 | 1 |
| 24 | Brodie Moles | Western Bulldogs | 24 years, 155 days | Round 2 | 13 | 7 |
| 25 | Steven Motlop | Geelong | 19 years, 24 days | Round 2 | 1 | 0 |
| 26 | Kane Lucas | Carlton | 18 years, 288 days | Round 3 | 8 | 1 |
| 27 | Travis Colyer | Essendon | 18 years, 229 days | Round 3 | 11 | 7 |
| 28 | Jake Melksham | Essendon | 18 years, 224 days | Round 3 | 14 | 6 |
| 29 | Ben Stratton | Hawthorn | 21 years, 41 days | Round 3 | 21 | 1 |
| 30 | James Podsiadly | Geelong | 28 years, 213 days | Round 3 | 17 | 45 |
| 31 | Dawson Simpson | Geelong | 21 years, 54 days | Round 3 | 2 | 0 |
| 32 | Ashton Hams | West Coast | 23 years, 222 days | Round 4 | 11 | 10 |
| 33 | Phil Davis | Adelaide | 19 years, 230 days | Round 4 | 15 | 1 |
| 34 | Simon White | Carlton | 21 years, 304 days | Round 4 | 6 | 1 |
| 35 | David Astbury | Richmond | 19 years, 51 days | Round 4 | 17 | 5 |
| 36 | Matthew Dea | Richmond | 18 years, 187 days | Round 4 | 3 | 0 |
| 37 | Troy Taylor | Richmond | 18 years, 218 days | Round 4 | 4 | 3 |
| 38 | Daniel Stewart | Port Adelaide | 21 years, 170 days | Round 4 | 11 | 12 |
| 39 | Jordan Roughead | Western Bulldogs | 18 years, 171 days | Round 5 | 8 | 3 |
| 40 | Ricky Henderson | Adelaide | 21 years, 244 days | Round 5 | 12 | 13 |
| 41 | Lewis Stevenson | West Coast | 20 years, 268 days | Round 5 | 10 | 2 |
| 42 | Matthew Lobbe | Port Adelaide | 21 years, 71 days | Round 5 | 3 | 0 |
| 43 | Ben Cunnington | North Melbourne | 18 years, 299 days | Round 5 | 18 | 1 |
| 44 | Nathan Fyfe | Fremantle | 18 years, 219 days | Round 5 | 18 | 14 |
| 45 | Matthew Jaensch | Adelaide | 20 years, 225 days | Round 6 | 11 | 7 |
| 46 | Dylan Roberton | Fremantle | 18 years, 315 days | Round 6 | 13 | 2 |
| 47 | Danny Hughes | Melbourne | 23 years, 148 days | Round 7 | 2 | 2 |
| 48 | Brad Sheppard | West Coast | 18 years, 350 days | Round 7 | 14 | 2 |
| 49 | Gary Rohan | Sydney | 18 years, 336 days | Round 7 | 9 | 7 |
| 50 | Jeromey Webberley | Richmond | 21 years, 301 days | Round 7 | 10 | 2 |
| 51 | Nick Heyne | St Kilda | 19 years, 298 days | Round 8 | 3 | 0 |
| 52 | Nathan O'Keefe | North Melbourne | 19 years, 278 days | Round 9 | 2 | 1 |
| 53 | Campbell Heath | Sydney | 19 years, 51 days | Round 9 | 2 | 0 |
| 54 | Jack Gunston | Adelaide | 18 years, 219 days | Round 9 | 2 | 1 |
| 55 | Rhys Stanley | St Kilda | 19 years, 173 days | Round 9 | 7 | 4 |
| 56 | Jordan Gysberts | Melbourne | 18 years, 352 days | Round 10 | 3 | 0 |
| 57 | Ben Griffiths | Richmond | 18 years, 254 days | Round 10 | 5 | 3 |
| 58 | Taylor Hunt | Geelong | 19 years, 212 days | Round 11 | 7 | 1 |
| 59 | Koby Stevens | West Coast | 19 years, 2 days | Round 13 | 5 | 2 |
| 60 | Andrew Strijk | West Coast | 22 years, 245 days | Round 13 | 10 | 11 |
| 61 | Jesse O'Brien | Brisbane Lions | 19 years, 138 days | Round 14 | 1 | 0 |
| 62 | Tyson Slattery | Essendon | 19 years, 212 days | Round 14 | 1 | 1 |
| 63 | Jarryd Blair | Collingwood | 20 years, 80 days | Round 14 | 9 | 6 |
| 64 | Trent Dennis-Lane | Sydney | 21 years, 308 days | Round 14 | 8 | 18 |
| 65 | Ashley Smith | West Coast | 19 years, 355 days | Round 15 | 8 | 2 |
| 66 | Robbie Tarrant | North Melbourne | 21 years, 77 days | Round 15 | 2 | 0 |
| 67 | Ryan Harwood | Brisbane Lions | 19 years, 16 days | Round 17 | 6 | 3 |
| 68 | Jamie Macmillan | North Melbourne | 18 years, 334 days | Round 17 | 4 | 1 |
| 69 | Ben Speight | North Melbourne | 20 years, 83 days | Round 17 | 2 | 1 |
| 70 | Kyle Hardingham | Essendon | 21 years, 326 days | Round 17 | 6 | 8 |
| 71 | Jesse Crichton | Fremantle | 19 years, 37 days | Round 17 | 6 | 2 |
| 72 | Tom Lynch | St Kilda | 19 years, 318 days | Round 18 | 1 | 0 |
| 73 | Robert Hicks | Richmond | 18 years, 296 days | Round 18 | 3 | 1 |
| 74 | Liam Jones | Western Bulldogs | 19 years, 158 days | Round 18 | 5 | 6 |
| 75 | Marcus White | North Melbourne | 19 years, 281 days | Round 18 | 2 | 0 |
| 76 | Justin Bollenhagen | Fremantle | 18 years, 227 days | Round 18 | 3 | 3 |
| 77 | Marcus Davies | Carlton | 19 years, 63 days | Round 19 | 5 | 0 |
| 78 | Jake Carlisle | Essendon | 18 years, 316 days | Round 20 | 3 | 2 |
| 79 | Stewart Crameri | Essendon | 22 years, 3 days | Round 20 | 3 | 0 |
| 80 | David Gourdis | Richmond | 21 years, 153 days | Round 20 | 3 | 0 |
| 81 | Jamie O'Reilly | Richmond | 22 years, 108 days | Round 20 | 3 | 0 |
| 82 | Daniel Menzel | Geelong | 18 years, 335 days | Round 20 | 3 | 4 |
| 83 | Luke Miles | St Kilda | 23 years, 295 days | Round 21 | 2 | 0 |
| 84 | Marcus Marigliani | Essendon | 24 years, 260 days | Round 21 | 2 | 2 |
| 85 | Jordan Jones | West Coast | 20 years, 54 days | Round 21 | 2 | 0 |
| 86 | Sam Reid | Sydney | 18 years, 244 days | Round 22 | 1 | 1 |
| 87 | Dylan Grimes | Richmond | 19 years, 44 days | Round 22 | 1 | 0 |
| 88 | Andrew Hooper | Western Bulldogs | 19 years, 236 days | Semi Final | 1 | 1 |

== Change of clubs ==
Players are listed in order of debut, and statistics are for AFL regular season and finals series matches during the 2010 AFL season only. Players are only included if they had previously played a senior AFL match with another club. "Previous club(s)" years are from the season of the player's debut for their respective club to the year in which they played their final game for that club.

| Order | Name | Club | Debut | Games (2010) | Goals (2010) | Previous club(s) |
|---|---|---|---|---|---|---|
| 1 | Lachlan Henderson | Carlton | Round 1 | 19 | 25 | Brisbane Lions (2008–2009) |
| 2 | Brock Mclean | Carlton | Round 1 | 6 | 2 | Melbourne (2004–2009) |
| 3 | Robert Warnock | Carlton | Round 1 | 12 | 4 | Fremantle (2007–2008) |
| 4 | Mitchell Farmer | Richmond | Round 1 | 17 | 4 | Port Adelaide (2008) |
| 5 | Mark Williams | Essendon | Round 1 | 4 | 5 | Hawthorn (2002–2009) |
| 6 | Josh Gibson | Hawthorn | Round 1 | 12 | 0 | Kangaroos (2006–2009) |
| 7 | Rhan Hooper | Hawthorn | Round 1 | 6 | 7 | Brisbane Lions (2006–2009) |
| 8 | Joel Macdonald | Melbourne | Round 1 | 17 | 0 | Brisbane Lions (2004–2010) |
| 9 | Brett Peake | St Kilda | Round 1 | 20 | 9 | Fremantle (2005–2009) |
| 10 | Daniel Bradshaw | Sydney | Round 1 | 9 | 28 | Brisbane Lions (1996–2009) |
| 11 | Josh Kennedy | Sydney | Round 1 | 24 | 10 | Hawthorn (2008–2009) |
| 12 | Ben McGlynn | Sydney | Round 1 | 14 | 23 | Hawthorn (2006–2009) |
| 13 | Shane Mumford | Sydney | Round 1 | 21 | 4 | Geelong (2008–2009) |
| 14 | Mark Seaby | Sydney | Round 1 | 6 | 2 | West Coast (2004–2009) |
| 15 | Amon Buchanan | Brisbane Lions | Round 1 | 12 | 9 | Sydney (2002–2009) |
| 16 | Brendan Fevola | Brisbane Lions | Round 1 | 17 | 48 | Carlton (1999–2009) |
| 17 | Matt Maguire | Brisbane Lions | Round 1 | 14 | 0 | St Kilda (2002–2008) |
| 18 | Andrew Raines | Brisbane Lions | Round 1 | 10 | 0 | Richmond (2004–2009) |
| 19 | Brent Staker | Brisbane Lions | Round 1 | 22 | 10 | West Coast (2003–2009) |
| 20 | Scott Harding | Port Adelaide | Round 1 | 2 | 0 | Brisbane Lions (2006–2009) |
| 21 | Jay Schulz | Port Adelaide | Round 1 | 16 | 33 | Richmond (2003–2009) |
| 22 | Barry Hall | Western Bulldogs | Round 1 | 23 | 79 | St Kilda (1996–2001); Sydney (2002–2009) |
| 23 | Darren Jolly | Collingwood | Round 1 | 23 | 22 | Melbourne (2001–2004); Sydney (2005–2009) |
| 24 | Luke Ball | Collingwood | Round 1 | 21 | 7 | St Kilda (2003–2009) |
| 25 | Adam Pattison | St Kilda | Round 2 | 5 | 1 | Richmond (2005–2009) |
| 26 | Bradd Dalziell | West Coast | Round 3 | 8 | 3 | Brisbane Lions (2008–2009) |
| 27 | Cameron Cloke | Port Adelaide | Round 3 | 1 | 0 | Collingwood (2004–2006); Carlton (2007–2009) |
| 28 | Chris Schmidt | Adelaide | Round 3 | 13 | 0 | Brisbane Lions (2007) |
| 29 | Shaun Burgoyne | Hawthorn | Round 8 | 16 | 7 | Port Adelaide (2002–2009) |
| 30 | Wayde Skipper | Hawthorn | Round 8 | 15 | 1 | Western Bulldogs (2003–2008) |
| 31 | Jay Nash | Port Adelaide | Round 11 | 8 | 0 | Essendon (2004–2009) |
| 32 | Xavier Clarke | Brisbane Lions | Round 18 | 1 | 0 | St Kilda (2002–2009) |
