= List of AFL debuts in 2009 =

This is a listing of Australian rules footballers to have made their debut with a club for the Australian Football League season 2009.

== List of players, sorted by club ==
=== Adelaide ===
- Players making their AFL debuts
1. Myke Cook (Round 1)
2. Jared Petrenko (Round 1)
3. Taylor Walker (Round 1)
4. Shaun McKernan (Round 14)
5. Brodie Martin (Round 16)
6. Rory Sloane (Round 20)

=== Brisbane Lions ===
- Players making their AFL debuts
1. Daniel Rich (Round 1)
2. Sam Sheldon (Round 6)
3. Matt Austin (Round 8)
4. Aaron Cornelius (Round 9)
5. Jack Redden (Round 15)
6. Tom Rockliff (Round 18)

=== Carlton ===
- Players making their AFL debuts
1. Jeff Garlett (Round 1)
2. Sam Jacobs (Round 1)
3. Aaron Joseph (Round 1)
4. Mitch Robinson (Round 1)
5. Chris Yarran (Round 7)
- Players from other clubs
1. Chris Johnson (Round 1) – previously played for Melbourne
2. Greg Bentley (Round 6) – previously played for Port Adelaide

=== Collingwood ===
- Players making their AFL debuts
1. Dayne Beams (Round 2)
2. Brent Macaffer (Round 5)
3. Steele Sidebottom (Round 7)
- Players from other clubs
1. Leigh Brown (Round 2) – previously played for Fremantle and North Melbourne
2. Anthony Corrie (Round 6) – previously played for Brisbane

=== Essendon ===
- Players making their AFL debuts
1. Michael Hurley (Round 1)
2. David Zaharakis (Round 2)
3. Michael Quinn (Round 2)
- Players from other clubs
1. Hayden Skipworth (Round 1) – previously played for Adelaide
2. Brent Prismall (Round 11) – previously played for Geelong

=== Fremantle ===
- Players making their AFL debuts
1. Stephen Hill (Round 1)
2. Nick Suban (Round 1)
3. Greg Broughton (Round 3)
4. Matt de Boer (Round 6)
5. Luke Pratt (Round 7)
6. Clancee Pearce (Round 11)
7. Michael Walters (Round 11)
8. Hayden Ballantyne (Round 13)
9. Zac Clarke (Round 13)
10. Tim Ruffles (Round 14)
11. Jay van Berlo (Round 17)

=== Geelong ===
- Players making their AFL debuts
1. Simon Hogan (Round 2)
2. Nathan Djerrkura (Round 10)
3. Tom Gillies (Round 15)
4. Jeremy Laidler (Round 15)

=== Hawthorn ===
- Players making their AFL debuts
1. Ryan Schoenmakers (Round 1)
2. Brendan Whitecross (Round 1)
3. Matt Suckling (Round 1)
4. Beau Muston (Round 9)
5. Liam Shiels (Round 10)
6. Shane Savage (Round 20)
7. Riley Milne (Round 21)

=== Melbourne ===
- Players making their AFL debuts
1. Kyle Cheney (Round 1)
2. Neville Jetta (Round 1)
3. Jamie Bennell (Round 1)
4. Jake Spencer (Round 1)
5. Jack Watts (Round 11)
6. Liam Jurrah (Round 12)
7. Jordie McKenzie (Round 17)
8. Rohan Bail (Round 19)
9. Tom McNamara (Round 19)
- Players from other clubs
1. John Meesen (Round 3) – previously played for Adelaide

=== North Melbourne ===
- Players making their AFL debuts
1. Jack Ziebell (Round 1)
2. Ben Warren (Round 4)
3. Levi Greenwood (Round 5)
4. Sam Wright (Round 8)
5. Nathan Grima (Round 8)
6. Cruize Garlett (Round 12)
7. Liam Anthony (Round 13)

=== Port Adelaide ===
- Players making their AFL debuts
1. Wade Thompson (Round 3)
2. Hamish Hartlett (Round 4)
3. Jason Davenport (Round 7)
4. Matthew Broadbent (Round 16)
- Players from other clubs
1. Danny Meyer (Round 12) – previously played for Richmond

=== Richmond ===
- Players making their AFL debuts
1. Andrew Browne (Round 1)
2. Robin Nahas (Round 2)
3. Alex Rance (Round 2)
4. Andrew Collins (Round 4)
5. Ty Vickery (Round 12)
6. Jarrod Silvester (Round 13)
7. Jayden Post (Round 14)
- Players from other clubs
1. Ben Cousins (Round 1) – previously played for West Coast
2. Tom Hislop (Round 2) – previously played for Essendon

=== St Kilda ===
- Players from other clubs
1. Zac Dawson (Round 1) – previously played for Hawthorn
2. Farren Ray (Round 1) – previously played for Western Bulldogs

=== Sydney Swans ===
- Players making their AFL debuts
1. Brett Meredith (Round 2)
2. Kristin Thornton (Round 4)
3. Mike Pyke (Round 6) – previously played for Canada national rugby union team
4. Dan Hannebery (Round 16)
- Players from other clubs
1. Rhyce Shaw (Round 1) – previously played for Collingwood

=== West Coast Eagles ===
- Players making their AFL debuts
1. Adam Cockie (Round 6)
2. Tom Swift (Round 10)
3. Nic Naitanui (Round 12)
4. Patrick McGinnity (Round 15)

=== Western Bulldogs ===
- Players making their AFL debuts
1. Liam Picken (Round 2)
2. Jarrad Grant (Round 5)
3. Brennan Stack (Round 11)
4. Easton Wood (Round 19)
