= Luke Dahlhaus =

Australian rules footballer

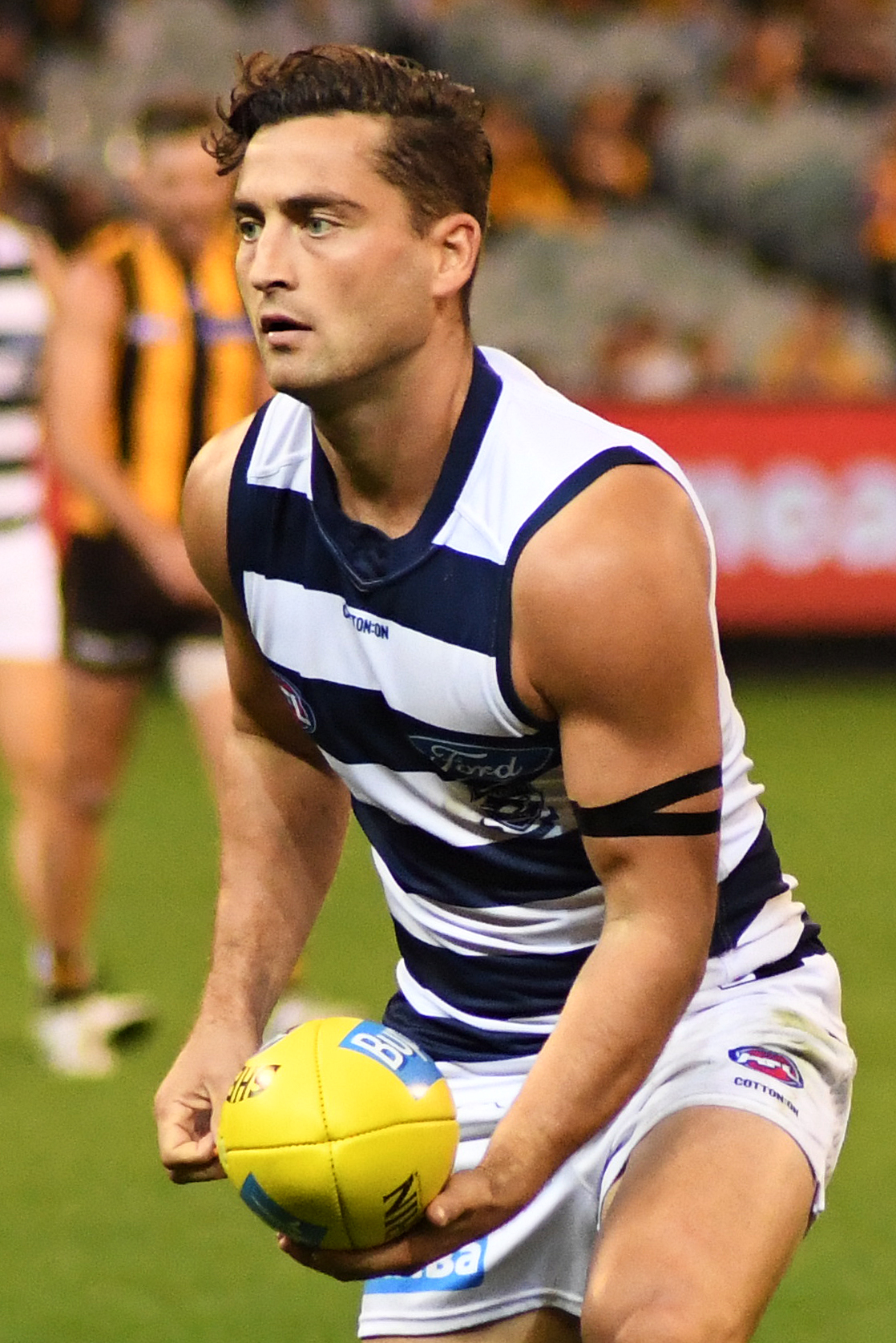
- Dahlhaus playing for Geelong in April 2019

Personal information
- Full name: Luke Dahlhaus
- Born: 21 August 1992 (age 34)
- Original team: Geelong Falcons (TAC Cup)
- Draft: No. 22, 2011 rookie draft
- Debut: Round 12, 2011, Western Bulldogs vs. St Kilda, at Etihad Stadium
- Height: 177 cm (5 ft 10 in)
- Weight: 78 kg (172 lb)
- Position: Midfielder / forward

Playing career^{1}
Years	Club	Games (Goals)
2011–2018	Western Bulldogs	154 (110)
2019–2022	Geelong	71 (31)
Total		225 (141)
- ^{1} Playing statistics correct to the end of 2022.

Career highlights
- AFL premiership player: 2016; AFL Rising Star nominee: 2011; St Joseph's College Team of Champions

Luke Dahlhaus (born 21 August 1992) is a former Australian rules footballer who played for the Geelong Football Club and Western Bulldogs in the Australian Football League (AFL). He received a nomination for the 2011 AFL Rising Star award in round 21 of the 2011 season. Dahlhaus was a member of the Bulldogs team that won the premiership in 2016, the Bulldogs' first in 62 years.

== Early career ==
Described as a "very strong and quick small forward who picks up possessions almost at will", as well as "a good stoppage player", Dahlhaus began playing football with his local team Leopold in the Geelong Football League. He was also selected to play for the Geelong Falcons in the TAC Cup youth competition, where he spent two seasons and played 27 games. In the 2010 TAC Cup, Dahlhaus averaged 21 disposals and six tackles per game, and was the leading tackler in the competition. He also represented Victoria Country at the under-18 national championships, and finished third in the Morrish Medal count with 18 votes. He was rewarded for his hard work by being named in the TAC Cup Team of the Year. Later in the year he broke the record for agility at the state screening.

== AFL career ==
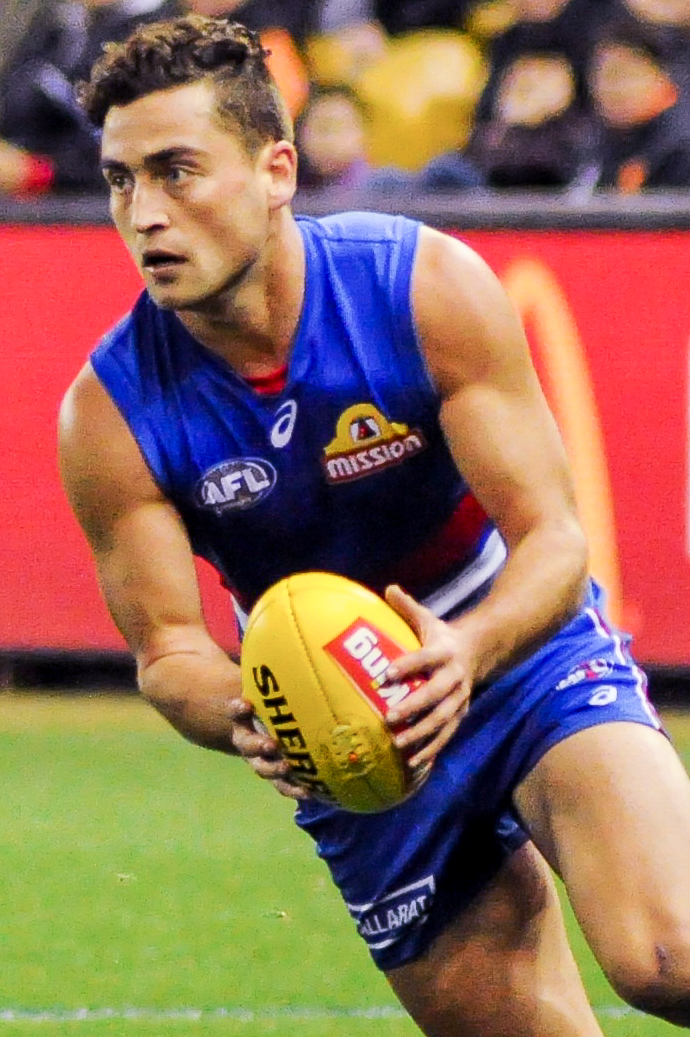
Dahlhaus playing for the Western Bulldogs in 2017

The Western Bulldogs selected Dahlhaus with their pick number 22 in the 2011 AFL Rookie Draft, and was assigned the guernsey number 40. He started the season playing for affiliate club Williamstown in the reserves side, but was soon promoted to the senior side, with coach Peter German noting his aggression and enthusiasm. After playing a handful of promising games for Williamstown, coupled with significant injury worries, the Bulldogs promoted Dahlhaus from the rookie list and named him as the substitute player in the match against St Kilda in Round 12 at Etihad Stadium. The Bulldogs lost the game, but Dahlhaus showed much promise in the limited game time he was given. He gathered nine disposals and showed some dash with his run-and-carry along the wings.
Better was to come in his next game against Adelaide. The Dogs broke a four-game losing streak - winning by 30 points - and Dahlhaus was recognized as one of the best Bulldogs players. He recorded 18 disposals with six inside-50s, laid four tackles and kicked his first career goal in the last quarter to seal the victory.

In round 21 Dahlhaus earned a nomination for the 2011 AFL Rising Star. Dahlhaus had a mostly inconsistent season throughout 2013 but played one of his best games in his career in Round 18 against West Coast at Etihad Stadium which he kicked 4 goals and picked up 29 disposals, the dogs won the game.

In September Dahlhaus shaved off his iconic dreadlocks live on Before The Game for the Whitten Foundation and the Good Friday Appeal. By the time his dreadlocks where shaved by teammate Liam Jones, he had raised A$13,035 for the charities.

In November it was announced that Dahlhaus had agreed to a contract extension with the Bulldogs and had also been upgraded to the senior list. During 2015, he had a strong, consistent season and was one of the favourites for the Best and Fairest which was won by Easton Wood.

In 2016, Dalhaus won the Rose–Sutton Medal in the match against Collingwood.

At the end of the 2018 season, Dahlhaus signed as an unrestricted free agent with the Geelong Cats.

In 2020 he was named in the St Joseph’s College Team of Champions, recognising the best and most loose VFL/AFL players to have attended the school. Dahlhaus was named in the Geelong team for the 2020 AFL Grand Final played in Brisbane due to COVID restrictions in Melbourne. The Cats led by 22 points at one stage before the Tigers turned the game around. Richmond eventually took a 2-point lead into three-quarter time before running out 31-point winners to claim their third AFL premiership in four seasons. In the Fox Sport player ratings, Dahlhaus' performance was graded as mediocre, with the exception of an industrious third quarter featuring some inside 50s and a crucial smother.

== Statistics ==
Statistics are correct to the end of the 2020 season

Legend
G	Goals	K	Kicks	D	Disposals	T	Tackles
B	Behinds	H	Handballs	M	Marks

Season	Team	No.	Games	Totals							Averages (per game)							Votes
Season	Team	No.	Games	G	B	K	H	D	M	T	G	B	K	H	D	M	T	Votes
2011	Western Bulldogs	40	11	11	7	76	79	155	23	46	1.0	0.6	6.9	7.2	14.1	2.1	4.2	1
2012	Western Bulldogs	40	17	13	18	174	124	298	45	67	0.8	1.1	10.2	7.3	17.5	2.6	3.9	4
2013	Western Bulldogs	6	22	28	18	177	192	369	37	90	1.3	0.8	8.0	8.7	16.8	1.7	4.1	7
2014	Western Bulldogs	6	21	17	23	239	214	453	71	87	0.8	1.1	11.4	10.2	21.6	3.4	4.1	3
2015	Western Bulldogs	6	23	17	10	276	314	590	77	120	0.7	0.4	12.0	13.7	25.7	3.3	5.2	7
2016^{#}	Western Bulldogs	6	21	9	8	228	318	546	67	113	0.4	0.4	10.9	15.1	26.0	3.2	5.4	7
2017	Western Bulldogs	6	22	13	6	199	352	551	74	93	0.6	0.3	9.0	16.0	25.0	3.4	4.2	6
2018	Western Bulldogs	6	17	2	4	127	238	365	67	72	0.1	0.2	7.5	14.0	21.5	3.9	4.2	0
2019	Geelong	40	24	14	16	171	262	433	71	115	0.6	0.7	7.1	10.9	18.0	3.0	4.8	0
2020 (Note: The 2020 season was played with 17 home-and-away matches per team (down from 22) and 16-minute quarters with time on (down from 20-minute quarters with time on) due to the impact of the COVID-19 pandemic.)	Geelong	40	16	7	0	89	127	216	44	37	0.4	0.0	5.6	7.9	13.5	2.8	2.3	0
Career			194	131	110	1756	2220	3976	576	840	0.7	0.6	9.1	11.4	20.5	3.0	4.3	35

== Honours and achievements ==
Team

- AFL premiership player (Western Bulldogs): 2016

Individual

- AFL Rising Star nominee: 2011
