= Alistair Smith =

Alistair Smith is the name of:

- Alistair Smith (Australian footballer) (born 1990), Australian rules footballer
- Alistair Smith (English footballer) (born 1999), English football midfielder
