= Alex Fasolo =

Australian rules footballer (born 1992)

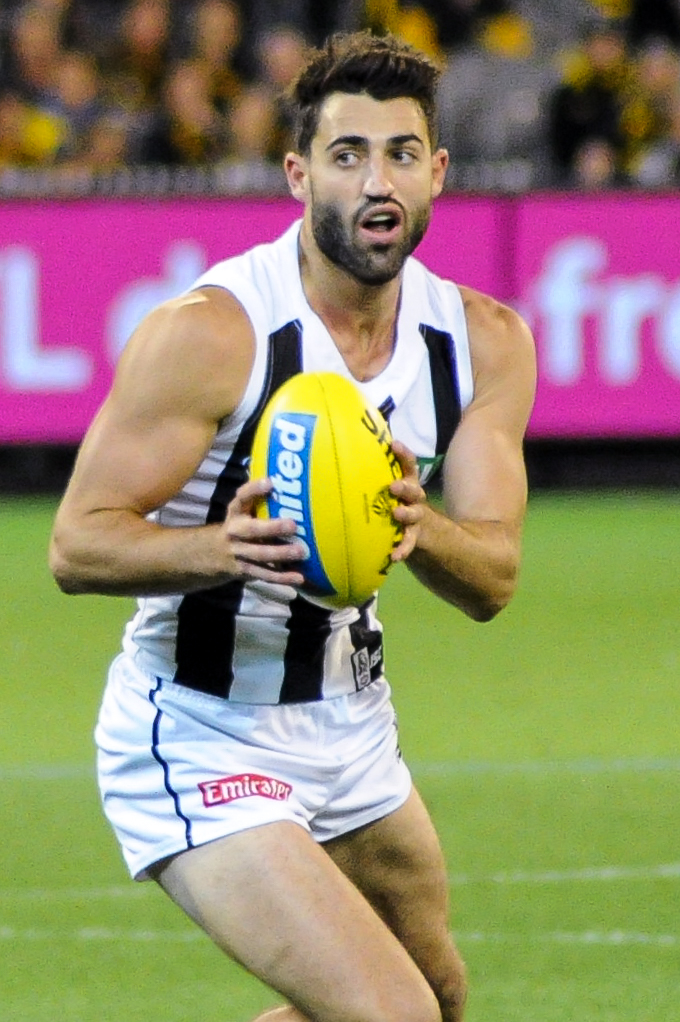
- Fasolo playing for Collingwood in March 2017

Personal information
- Full name: Alexander Fasolo
- Nicknames: Faz, Felix
- Born: 8 June 1992 (age 34); Western Australia
- Original team: East Fremantle (WAFL)
- Draft: No. 45, 2010 National Draft, Collingwood
- Height: 179 cm (5 ft 10 in)
- Weight: 84 kg (185 lb)
- Position: Forward

Playing career^{1}
Years	Club	Games (Goals)
2011–2018	Collingwood	101 (133)
2019	Carlton	3 (2)
Total		104 (135)
- ^{1} Playing statistics correct to the end of 2019.

Career highlights
- Collingwood leading goalkicker: 2016; Harry Collier Trophy: 2011; AFL Rising Star nominee: 2011

Alexander Fasolo (born 8 June 1992) is a former Australian rules footballer who played for the Collingwood Football Club and the Carlton Football Club in the Australian Football League (AFL). He attended Trinity College in East Perth for his secondary schooling.

== Career ==
Fasolo played for East Fremantle in the WAFL before being drafted by Collingwood with pick 45 in the 2010 AFL draft.

Fasolo was Collingwood's first draft pick in 2010, and was given Simon Prestigiacomo's number 35 guernsey.

He made his debut in Round 12 of the 2011 season in the Queen's Birthday Clash against Melbourne, scoring a goal with his first kick in League football.

Fasolo was nominated for the 2011 AFL Rising Star award after his round 22 match against Brisbane Lions.

At the conclusion of the 2018 season, Fasolo moved to Carlton as an unrestricted free agent. He played three senior matches for the club in 2019 before retiring at the end of the season.

== Personal ==
In 2017, it was revealed that Fasolo was battling with depression.

== Statistics ==
Statistics are correct to the end of the 2019 season

Legend
G	Goals	K	Kicks	D	Disposals	T	Tackles
B	Behinds	H	Handballs	M	Marks

Season	Team	No.	Games	Totals							Averages (per game)						
Season	Team	No.	Games	G	B	K	H	D	M	T	G	B	K	H	D	M	T
2011	Collingwood	35	13	16	8	82	65	147	43	29	1.2	0.6	6.3	5.0	11.3	3.3	2.2
2012	Collingwood	1	24	28	20	236	135	371	113	64	1.2	0.8	9.8	5.6	15.5	4.7	2.7
2013	Collingwood	1	3	1	2	24	9	33	12	5	0.3	0.7	8.0	3.0	11.0	4.0	1.7
2014	Collingwood	1	12	7	9	103	77	180	51	31	0.6	0.8	8.6	6.4	15.0	4.3	2.6
2015	Collingwood	1	17	27	15	150	86	236	81	49	1.6	0.9	8.8	5.1	13.9	4.8	2.9
2016	Collingwood	1	12	25	6	99	73	172	44	36	2.1	0.5	8.3	6.1	14.3	3.7	3.0
2017	Collingwood	1	19	29	29	169	87	256	105	38	1.5	1.5	8.9	4.6	13.5	5.5	2.0
2018	Collingwood	1	1	0	0	1	1	2	1	1	0.0	0.0	1.0	1.0	2.0	1.0	1.0
2019	Carlton	32	3	2	0	11	9	20	6	8	0.6	0.0	3.6	3.0	6.6	2.0	2.6
			104	135	89	875	542	1417	456	261	1.3	0.9	8.4	5.2	13.6	4.4	2.5
