= Luke Rounds =

Australian rules footballer

Personal information
- Full name: Luke Rounds
- Born: 10 February 1991 (age 35); Victoria
- Original team: Geelong Falcons (TAC Cup)
- Draft: No. 46, 2008 National Draft, Collingwood
- Height: 181 cm (5 ft 11 in)
- Weight: 75 kg (165 lb)
- Position: Forward

Playing career^{1}
Years	Club	Games (Goals)
2009–2012	Collingwood	6 (1)
- ^{1} Playing statistics correct to the end of 2012.

Luke Rounds (born 10 February 1991) is a former professional Australian rules footballer, who played for the Collingwood Football Club in the Australian Football League (AFL).

Originally from Mortlake, Victoria where he attended Mortlake College, he was drafted to Collingwood with the 46th selection (3rd round) in the 2008 AFL draft. In 2008 he played for Terang-Mortlake in the Hampden Football League, Geelong Falcons in the TAC Cup and Victoria Country in the 2008 AFL Under 18 Championships. He is the cousin of former Melbourne, Footscray and St Kilda player Luke Beveridge, who is the current coach of the Western Bulldogs (formerly known as Footscray).
