= 2011 AFL Rising Star =

Australian rules football award

2011 NAB AFL Rising Star
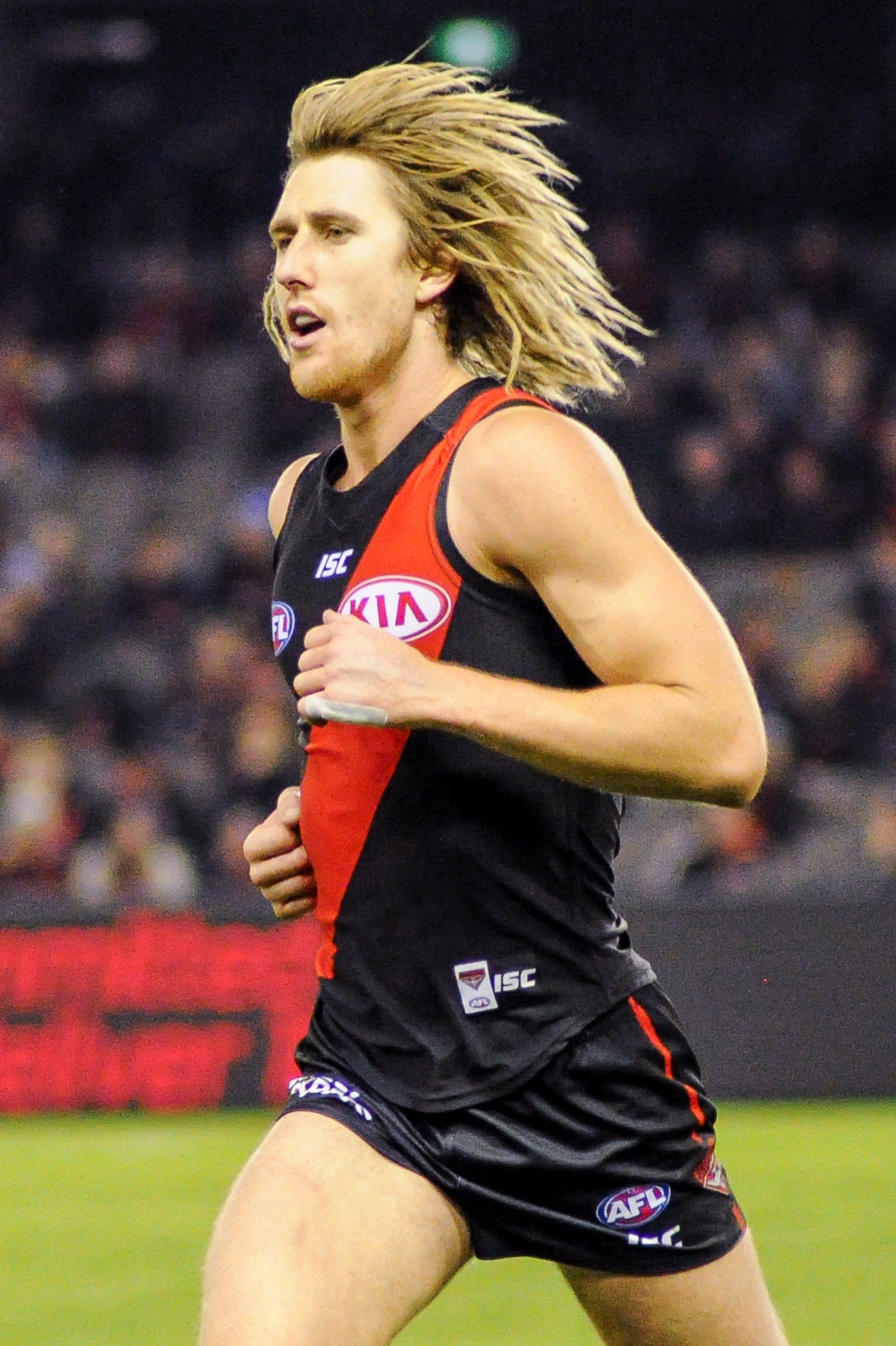
- Dyson Heppell, winner of the 2011 Rising Star, playing in June 2017
- Sponsored by: National Australia Bank
- Date: 1 September
- Country: Australia
- Ron Evans medallist: Dyson Heppell (Essendon)

The NAB AFL Rising Star award is given annually to a young stand-out player in the Australian Football League. The 2011 award was won by Dyson Heppell of the Essendon Football Club, who received the Ron Evans Medal.

== Eligibility ==
Every round, an Australian Football League rising star nomination is given to a young stand-out player. To be eligible for nomination, a player must be under 21 on 1 January of that year and have played 10 or fewer senior games before the start of the season; a player who is suspended may be nominated, but is not eligible to win the award. At the end of the year, one of the 24 nominees is the winner of award.

== Nominations ==
Round	Player	Club	Ref.
1	Dyson Heppell	Essendon	
2	Luke Shuey	West Coast	
3	Mitch Duncan	Geelong	
4	Jasper Pittard	Port Adelaide	
5	Brandon Matera	Gold Coast	
6	Jack Darling	West Coast	
7	Zac Smith	Gold Coast	
8	Shane Savage	Hawthorn	
9	Reece Conca	Richmond	
10	Jack Steven	St Kilda	
11	Jordan Gysberts	Melbourne	
12	Sam Reid	Sydney	
13	Daniel Menzel	Geelong	
14	David Swallow	Gold Coast	
15	Luke Breust	Hawthorn	
16	Jake Batchelor	Richmond	
17	Trent McKenzie	Gold Coast	
18	Allen Christensen	Geelong	
19	Andrew Gaff	West Coast	
20	Zac Clarke	Fremantle	
21	Luke Dahlhaus	Western Bulldogs	
22	Alex Fasolo	Collingwood	
23	Sam Blease	Melbourne	
24	Liam Jones	Western Bulldogs	

== Final voting ==
	Player	Club	Votes
1	Dyson Heppell	Essendon	44
2	Luke Shuey	West Coast	37
3	Zac Smith	Gold Coast	21
4	David Swallow	Gold Coast	18
5	Jack Darling	West Coast	6
6	Sam Reid	Sydney	5
7	Andrew Gaff	West Coast	1
7	Trent McKenzie	Gold Coast	1
7	Daniel Menzel	Geelong	1
7	Jack Steven	St Kilda	1
Source: AFL Record Season Guide 2015
