= Luke Shuey =

Australian rules footballer (born 1990)

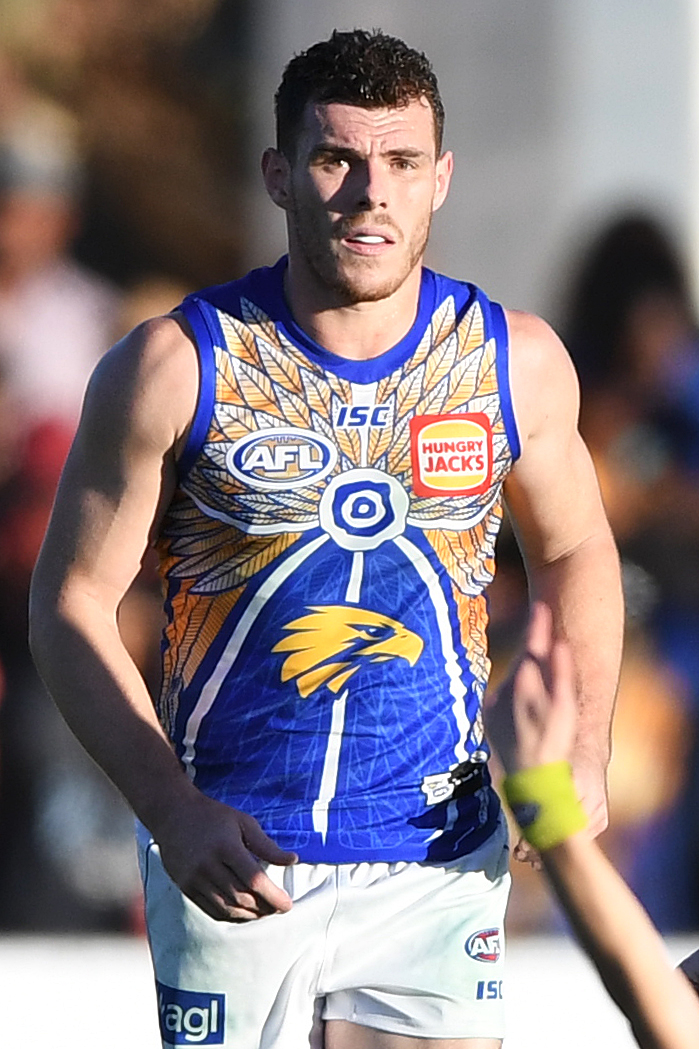
- Shuey playing for West Coast in July 2019

Personal information
- Full name: Luke Shuey
- Nicknames: Boots, Chingy
- Born: 2 June 1990 (age 36)
- Original team: Oakleigh Chargers/Marcellin College/Bulleen-Templestowe
- Draft: 18th overall, 2008 (West Coast)
- Height: 184 cm (6 ft 0 in)
- Weight: 89 kg (196 lb)
- Position: Midfielder

Playing career^{1}
Years	Club	Games (Goals)
2009–2023	West Coast	248 (142)

International team honours^{2}
Years	Team	Games (Goals)
2017	Australia	2 (1)
- ^{1} Playing statistics correct to the end of 2023.^{2} Representative statistics correct as of 2017.

Career highlights
- West Coast captain: 2020–2023; AFL premiership player: 2018; Norm Smith Medal: 2018; 2× John Worsfold Medal: 2016, 2019; AFL Rising Star nominee: 2011

Luke Shuey (born 2 June 1990) is a former Australian rules footballer and former captain of the West Coast Eagles in the Australian Football League (AFL). He retired at the conclusion of the 2023 AFL season.

Shuey was recruited from the Oakleigh Chargers with pick 20 in the 2008 National Draft. After a series of injuries, he made his AFL debut during the 2010 season. He was runner-up in the AFL Rising Star award in 2011. Shuey won the John Worsfold Medal as West Coast's best and fairest player in 2016, and again in 2019, and finished third in the award in 2014 and 2017. Awarded 'Player of the finals' in 2019, adding to his September reputation where a year earlier he played in the club's victory over Collingwood in the 2018 Grand Final, and was awarded the Norm Smith Medal as the best player on the ground.

== Early career ==
Shuey was raised in the Melbourne suburb of Templestowe and attended Marcellin College, playing for the school football team. One of his teammates was David Zaharakis, who was also drafted into the AFL. Outside of school football, Shuey played his junior football for Bulleen-Templestowe.

In 2008, his final year of high school, he was selected for the Oakleigh Chargers in the TAC Cup. He also represented Vic Metro at the 2008 AFL Under 18 Championships, winning the team's best and fairest award. Shuey placed fourth in the beep test at the 2008 AFL Draft Camp. At the 2008 National Draft, he was selected in the second round, taken by West Coast with the 18th pick overall.

== AFL career ==
As part of West Coast's affiliation with the West Australian Football League (WAFL), Shuey was allocated to East Perth upon his arrival in Perth to pursue his career. However, he did not play senior football at all during the 2009 season (in either the WAFL or AFL), suffering a series of injuries which included osteitis pubis, a broken leg, and two hernias. Shuey later said his injuries were in part due to playing too much football during the previous year. After a strong pre-season, Shuey made his AFL debut in round one of the 2010 season, against the Brisbane Lions. He scored a goal with his first kick. However, after just three games at AFL level, Shuey suffered a knee injury. He was due to return midway through the season, but then contracted a virus which was eventually diagnosed as glandular fever. He eventually returned for West Coast's last three games of the season, as well as two WAFL matches for East Perth. He established himself in West Coast's midfield line-up during the 2011 season, playing in all 25 of his team's matches (one of only seven West Coast players to do so). He was nominated for the 2011 AFL Rising Star award in round two, after a 27-disposal and three-goal game against Port Adelaide. He eventually finished runner-up to Essendon's Dyson Heppell in the award, with Heppell polling 44 votes and Shuey 37 votes. This was the best finish by a West Coast player since Chris Judd was runner-up in 2002. Shuey also polled 12 votes in the 2011 Brownlow Medal, and including three votes in the round-18 Western Derby against Fremantle (although Dean Cox won the Ross Glendinning Medal). In the round-nine game against the Western Bulldogs he had kicked a career-high five goals and recorded 27 disposals but was only awarded two Brownlow votes.

During the 2012 season, Shuey was suspended on two occasions – for one week after striking Fremantle's Paul Duffield in round nine, and for two weeks after striking North Melbourne's Lindsay Thomas in round 15. He polled 11 votes in the 2012 Brownlow Medal, including best on ground performances against Greater Western Sydney in round three (25 disposals and five goals) and against Gold Coast in round 14 (32 disposals and three goals).

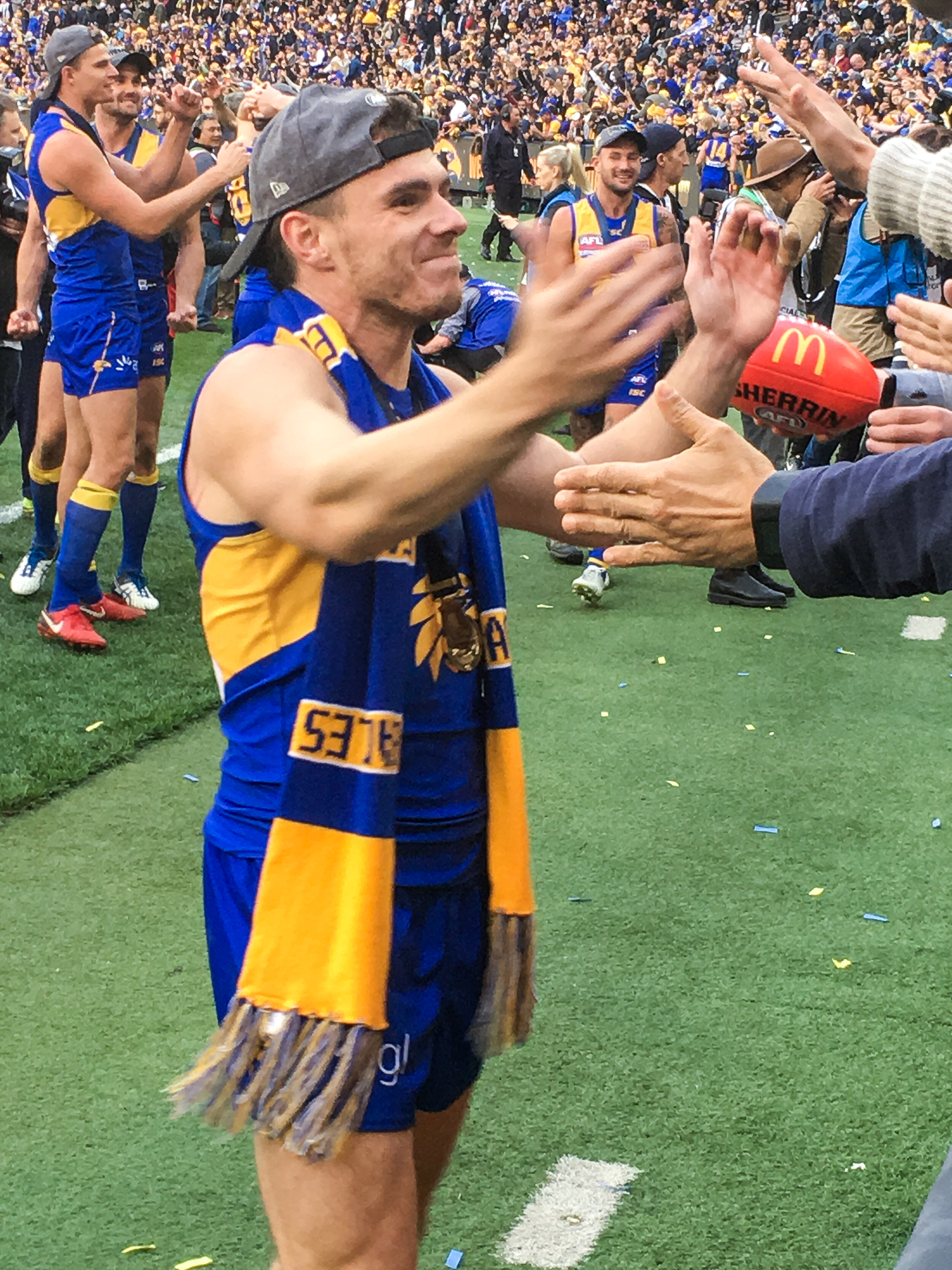
Shuey celebrating after the 2018 AFL Grand Final

After a career best season in 2016, Shuey was named in the initial All-Australian 40-man squad, though he did not make the final team. He also won the John Worsfold Medal as the club best and fairest.

In September 2017, Shuey kicked a goal after the siren against Port Adelaide to win the first elimination final at Adelaide Oval. It was the first after-the-siren goal in extra time in AFL history.

Shuey won the 2018 Norm Smith Medal for his brilliant performance against Collingwood in the AFL Grand Final, recording 34 possessions and a goal. He received eleven out of twelve possible votes from the four judges. His team, the West Coast Eagles, won the premiership.

On 6 December 2019 it was announced that Shuey would become the 11th captain of the West Coast Eagles.

After battling frequent hamstring injuries during his captaincy, Shuey announced on 8 August 2023 that he would retire at season's end.

== Statistics ==
Statistics are correct to the end of 2023.

Legend
G	Goals	K	Kicks	D	Disposals	T	Tackles
B	Behinds	H	Handballs	M	Marks
#	Played in that season's premiership team

Season	Team	No.	Games	Totals							Averages (per game)							Votes
Season	Team	No.	Games	G	B	K	H	D	M	T	G	B	K	H	D	M	T	Votes
2010	West Coast	13	6	6	4	59	47	106	20	22	1.0	0.7	9.8	7.8	17.7	3.3	3.7	0
2011	West Coast	13	25	24	22	323	179	502	65	104	1.0	0.9	12.9	7.2	20.1	2.6	4.2	12
2012	West Coast	13	21	19	22	286	197	483	82	89	0.9	1.0	13.6	9.4	23.0	3.9	4.2	11
2013	West Coast	13	14	9	8	178	123	301	48	67	0.6	0.6	12.7	8.8	21.5	3.4	4.8	5
2014	West Coast	13	20	17	14	249	235	484	74	80	0.9	0.7	12.5	11.8	24.2	3.7	4.0	9
2015	West Coast	13	25	24	12	273	320	593	82	123	1.0	0.5	10.9	12.8	23.7	3.3	4.9	7
2016	West Coast	13	23	12	8	272	324	596	56	149	0.5	0.3	11.8	14.1	25.9	2.4	6.5	10
2017	West Coast	13	23	11	7	312	293	605	93	134	0.5	0.3	13.6	12.7	26.3	4.0	5.8	10
2018^{#}	West Coast	13	20	6	7	257	219	476	63	97	0.3	0.4	12.9	11.0	23.8	3.2	4.9	6
2019	West Coast	13	24	8	2	409	238	647	81	129	0.3	0.1	17.0	9.9	27.0	3.4	5.4	15
2020	West Coast	13	13	1	1	144	101	245	33	46	0.0	0.0	11.0	7.7	18.8	2.5	3.5	6
2021	West Coast	13	7	0	1	104	56	160	23	30	0.0	0.1	14.8	8.0	22.8	3.2	4.2	0
2022	West Coast	13	17	3	2	207	157	364	48	100	0.1	0.1	12.1	9.2	21.4	2.8	5.8	0
2023	West Coast	13	10	2	2	105	93	198	20	48	0.2	0.2	10.5	9.3	19.8	2	4.8	2
Career			248	142	112	3178	2582	5760	788	1218	0.6	0.5	12.8	10.4	23.2	3.2	4.9	93

== Honours and achievements ==
AFL

- 1× AFL Premiership Player: 2018
- 1× Norm Smith Medallist: 2018
- 2× All-Australian 40-man Squad: 2016, 2019
- AFL Rising Star runner-up: 2011

West Coast Eagles

- Captain: 2020–2023
- 2× John Worsfold Medallist: 2016, 2019
- 1× Chris Mainwaring Medallist: 2016
- Rookie of the year: 2011

== Personal life ==
In February 2009, Shuey's younger sister Melanie was struck and killed by a motorcycle while walking. He was given indefinite leave from football after her death and stayed in Melbourne for six weeks before returning to Perth.

Shuey and his wife Dani Orlando have two children.

Patrick Skene also reports that Luke Shuey has Chinese ancestry. He is a descendant of Ah Shuey, who came to Australia in 1862.

== See also ==
- List of AFL debuts in 2010
- List of West Coast Eagles players
