= Clancee Pearce =

Australian rules footballer (born 1990)

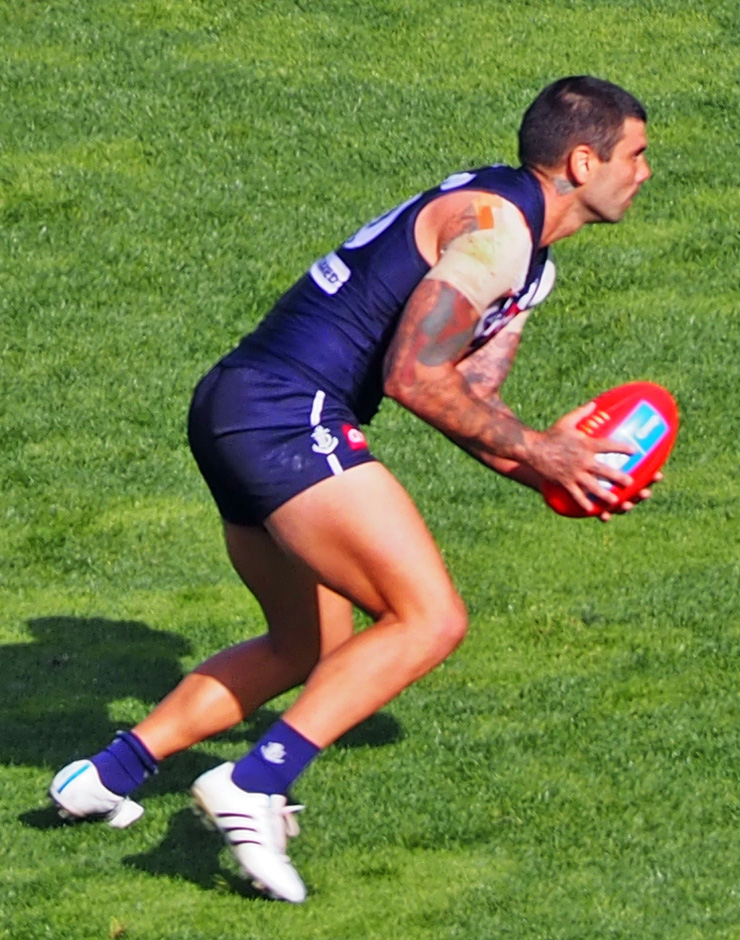

Personal information
- Full name: Clancee Pearce
- Born: 23 October 1990 (age 36); Canberra, Australia
- Original team: Swan Districts (WAFL)
- Draft: No. 48, 2009 Rookie Draft, Fremantle
- Height: 182 cm (6 ft 0 in)
- Weight: 85 kg (187 lb)
- Position: Utility

Playing career^{1}
Years	Club	Games (Goals)
2009–2016	Fremantle	100 (36)
- ^{1} Playing statistics correct to the end of 2016.

Career highlights
- WAFL Premiership Player: 2016

Clancee Pearce (born 23 October 1990) is a former professional Australian rules footballer who played for the Fremantle Football Club in the Australian Football League (AFL).

After attending Chisholm Catholic College and then Guildford Grammar School, Pearce made his senior debut in the WAFL for Swan Districts in Round 17, 2008 and played in eight league games, including the 2008 WAFL Grand Final, which the Swans lost to Subiaco. He had played in Swan Districts' colts premiership winning side in 2007. Pearce represented Western Australia at the 2008 AFL Under 18 Championships and was named in the All-Australian Team. He was also named as the captain of the 2008 WAFL Colts Team of the Year, but was overlooked in the 2008 National Draft and instead was drafted to Fremantle in the 2009 Rookie Draft with Fremantle's fourth round selection, number 48 overall. After displaying good form during the 2009 WAFL season, including a career high 26 disposals against Peel Thunder in late May, he was elevated to Fremantle's senior list in early June 2009.

Pearce made his AFL debut for Fremantle in Round 11 of the 2009 AFL season at Football Park against Port Adelaide, after four key players were omitted due to injury. He was the sixth player to make his debut for Fremantle in 2009 and the fourth rookie listed player to be elevated to the senior list. His mother is Indian and he is only the fourth player of Indian descent to play AFL football.

He kicked a goal in his debut match, minutes after fellow debutant and Swan Districts teammate Michael Walters also kicked a goal. In total he gathered 16 possessions and six marks, but Fremantle lost the match by 24 points.

He was delisted by Fremantle at the conclusion of the 2016 season and re-signed to play with Swan Districts in the WAFL. However, in January 2017 Pearce ruptured his anterior cruciate ligament during training and was unable to play for the whole of the 2017 season.

== Statistics ==
Legend
G	Goals	K	Kicks	D	Disposals	T	Tackles
B	Behinds	H	Handballs	M	Marks

Season	Team	No.	Games	Totals							Averages (per game)						
Season	Team	No.	Games	G	B	K	H	D	M	T	G	B	K	H	D	M	T
2009	Fremantle	46	8	6	4	64	37	101	32	14	0.8	0.5	8.0	4.6	12.6	4.0	1.8
2010	Fremantle	46	6	2	0	36	39	75	24	20	0.3	0.0	6.0	6.5	12.5	4.0	3.3
2011	Fremantle	46	12	5	8	78	73	151	37	58	0.4	0.7	6.5	6.1	12.6	3.1	4.8
2012	Fremantle	46	24	16	6	247	222	469	120	103	0.7	0.2	10.3	9.2	19.5	5.0	4.3
2013	Fremantle	46	19	2	3	195	144	339	110	44	0.1	0.2	10.3	7.6	17.8	5.8	2.3
2014	Fremantle	46	9	0	2	56	66	122	33	16	0.0	0.2	6.2	7.3	13.6	3.7	1.8
2015	Fremantle	46	18	5	1	192	144	336	99	41	0.3	0.1	10.7	8.0	18.7	5.5	2.3
2016	Fremantle	46	4	0	0	41	39	80	19	9	0.0	0.0	10.2	9.8	20.0	4.8	2.2
Career			100	36	24	909	764	1673	474	305	0.4	0.2	9.1	7.6	16.7	4.7	3.0
