= 2008 AFL draft =

Draft for the Australian Football League

General information
- Dates: 29 November 2008; 16 December 2008
- Network: Fox Sports
- Sponsored by: National Australia Bank

Overview
- League: AFL
- First selection: Jack Watts (Melbourne)

The 2008 AFL draft consisted of four opportunities for player acquisitions during the 2008/09 Australian Football League off-season. These were trade week (held between 6 October and 10 October), the national draft (held on 29 November), the pre-season draft (16 December) and the rookie draft (16 December). It was considered to be the last uncompromised draft before the draft concessions given to the Gold Coast and Greater Western Sydney expansion teams restrict the existing AFL clubs' access to the best young players in the future years drafts.

== Player changes ==
=== Trades ===
Throughout the year there was much speculation about high-profile players such as Jonathan Brown, Alan Didak and Daniel Kerr being likely to be traded during the AFL's annual trading period, but each re-signed with their clubs before the trading period started. The main discussions during trade week were the surprise request by Ryan O'Keefe to be traded from Sydney, as well as the destination of young Fremantle ruckman Robert Warnock, both of whom wished to be traded back to their home city of Melbourne. Other players to request trades include Andrew Lovett, Brent Prismall, Mark Seaby, Farren Ray, Josh Carr and Daniel Harris.

North Melbourne surprised many early in the week by naming Hamish McIntosh and Corey Jones as players available to trade, with McIntosh later being withdrawn from the offer after a backlash from his manager and club legend Glenn Archer.

Like most years, no trades were completed during the first three days of the trade week and for the first time the AFL was requested to assist by providing a mediator to solve the stand-off between Fremantle and Carlton over the Warnock deal. Carlton had offered its second round selection, #24 overall, but Fremantle wanted its first round selection, the sixth overall. On the final day of trade week Warnock was traded. The deal included Fremantle's pick No. 69, in exchange for Carlton's picks 24, 56 and 72.

In total only six trades were completed, with O'Keefe, Lovett, Seaby, Carr and Harris unable to finalise deals during the week. The low number of completed trades prompted calls by the AFLPA for a form of free agency to be introduced, although it could be explained as a one-off event due to a combination of the high regard for the players available in year's draft and the impending concessions to be given to the expansion teams, Gold Coast and Greater Western Sydney in the coming years.

Player	Original club	New club	Traded for
Adam Thomson	Port Adelaide	Richmond	draft pick #42
Rhyce Shaw and draft pick #61	Collingwood	Sydney	draft pick #46
Anthony Corrie	Brisbane Lions	Collingwood	draft pick #93
Farren Ray and draft pick #48	Western Bulldogs	St Kilda	draft pick #31
Brent Prismall	Geelong	Essendon	draft pick #39
Robert Warnock and draft pick #69	Fremantle	Carlton	draft pick #24, #56 and #72

=== Retirements and delistings ===
Name	Club	Date Retired	Reason
Beau McDonald	Brisbane Lions	14 February	Retired due to ongoing injury
Danny Jacobs	Hawthorn	12 March	Retired due to a hip injury.
Hugh Minson	Port Adelaide	9 April	Retired due to knee problems.
David Neitz	Melbourne	19 May	Retired due to neck problems.
Matthew Carr	Fremantle	19 May	Retired due to leg problems.
Michael Braun	West Coast	7 July (finished season)	Retired
Peter Bell	Fremantle	7 July	Retired
Andrew McDougall	Western Bulldogs	17 July	Retired
Shaun McManus	Fremantle	29 July	Retired
Michael Wilson	Port Adelaide	5 August	Retired due to ongoing injury.
Robert Harvey	St Kilda	6 August (finished season)	Retired
Heath Black	Fremantle	6 August	Retired due to ongoing injury
Mal Michael	Essendon	15 August (finished season)	Retired
Rhett Biglands	Adelaide	18 August	Retired due to knee injury
Nigel Lappin	Brisbane Lions	19 August	Retired due to an achilles injury .
Mark Johnson	Fremantle	20 August (finished season)	Retired
Jason Johnson	Essendon	25 August	Retired
Adam Ramanauskas	Essendon	25 August	Retired
Shannon Grant	North Melbourne	26 August (finished season)	Retired
Luke Webster	Fremantle	27 August	Retired
Nathan Bassett	Adelaide	27 August (finished season)	Retired due to health concerns.
Ben Holland	Melbourne	30 August	Retired
Jeff Farmer	Fremantle	2 September	Retired
Nathan Ablett	Geelong	2 September	Retired
Ben Mathews	Sydney	2 September	Retired
Jess Sinclair	North Melbourne	10 September	Retired
Peter Everitt	Sydney	12 September	Retired
Fraser Gehrig	St Kilda	13 September	Retired
Ryan Lonie	Collingwood	15 September	Retired due to ongoing injury
Shane Wakelin	Collingwood	15 September	Retired
Nathan Thompson	North Melbourne	19 September	Retired
Scott Burns	Collingwood	22 September	Retired
Ken McGregor	Adelaide	30 September	Retired
Jason Saddington	Carlton	13 October	Retired
Shane Crawford	Hawthorn	8 November	Retired
Courtney Johns	Essendon	15 August	Delisted
Damien Peverill	Essendon	25 August	Delisted
Jeff White	Melbourne	26 August	Delisted
Adem Yze	Melbourne	26 August	Delisted
Greg Tivendale	Richmond	28 August	Delisted
Ryley Dunn	Fremantle	3 September	Delisted
Steven Armstrong	West Coast	4 September	Delisted
Chad Jones	West Coast	4 September	Delisted
James Thomson	West Coast	4 September	Delisted
Jace Bode	Melbourne	4 September	Delisted
Isaac Weetra	Melbourne	4 September	Delisted
Robert Copeland	Brisbane Lions	19 September	Delisted
Chris Schmidt	Brisbane Lions	19 September	Delisted
Wayde Mills	Brisbane Lions	19 September	Delisted
Haydn Kiel	Brisbane Lions	19 September	Delisted
Brodie Holland	Collingwood	23 September	Delisted
Chris Egan	Collingwood	23 September	Delisted
Sam Iles	Collingwood	23 September	Delisted
Scott West	Western Bulldogs	23 September	Delisted
Peter Street	Western Bulldogs	23 September	Delisted
Nick Davis	Sydney	12 October	Delisted
Liam Bedford	Geelong	15 October	Delisted
Jason Davenport	Geelong	15 October	Delisted
Chris Kangars	Geelong	15 October	Delisted
Tim Clarke	Hawthorn	16 October	Delisted
Zac Dawson	Hawthorn	16 October	Delisted
Luke McEntee	Hawthorn	16 October	Delisted
Garry Moss	Hawthorn	16 October	Delisted
Jayden Attard	St Kilda	22 October	Delisted
Matthew Ferguson	St Kilda	22 October	Delisted
Michael Rix	St Kilda	22 October	Delisted
Shane Birss	St Kilda	22 October	Delisted
Charlie Gardiner	St Kilda	22 October	Delisted
Glenn Chivers	St Kilda	22 October	Delisted
Luke Van Rheenen	St Kilda	22 October	Delisted
Aaron Fiora	St Kilda	31 October	Delisted
Chris Johnson	Melbourne	31 October	Delisted

== 2008 national draft ==
The 2008 national draft was held on 29 November. Melbourne finished the 2008 AFL season in last position and had the first selection in the draft. As both Melbourne and West Coast Eagles won less than 5 games during the season, they were eligible for a priority pick. As this was the first year in which they qualified, the priority pick was allocated between the first and second rounds of selections.

Ayce Cordy was the first player selected in the draft as the only father–son selection. The Western Bulldogs had to use their 1st round selection, #14, to secure him after St Kilda bid their #1st round selection for him. His father, Brian, played 124 games for the Bulldogs in the 1980s.

The top two selections were widely tipped to be Jack Watts and Nic Naitanui, with Daniel Rich, Ty Vickery, Stephen Hill, Chris Yarran and Hamish Hartlett to fill the next few selections.

*	Denotes player who has been a premiership player and been selected for at least one All-Australian team
^{+}	Denotes player who has been a premiership player at least once
^{x}	Denotes player who has been selected for at least one All-Australian team
^{#}	Denotes player who has never played in a VFL/AFL home and away season or finals game
^{~}	Denotes player who has been selected as Rising Star

Round	Pick	Player	Recruited from	League	Club
1	1	Jack Watts	Sandringham Dragons	TAC Cup	Melbourne
1	2	Nic Naitanui	Swan Districts	WAFL	West Coast
1	3	Stephen Hill	West Perth	WAFL	Fremantle
1	4	Hamish Hartlett	West Adelaide	SANFL	Port Adelaide
1	5	Michael Hurley	Northern Knights	TAC Cup	Essendon
1	6	Chris Yarran	Swan Districts	WAFL	Carlton
1	7	Daniel Rich ^{x}	Subiaco	WAFL	Brisbane Lions
1	8	Ty Vickery	Sandringham Dragons	TAC Cup	Richmond
1	9	Jack Ziebell	Murray Bushrangers	TAC Cup	North Melbourne
1	10	Phil Davis	North Adelaide	SANFL	Adelaide
1	11	Steele Sidebottom	Murray Bushrangers	TAC Cup	Collingwood
1	12	Lewis Johnston	North Adelaide	SANFL	Sydney
1	13	Tom Lynch	Sandringham Dragons	TAC Cup	St Kilda
1	14 (F/S)	Ayce Cordy	Geelong Falcons	TAC Cup	Western Bulldogs
1	15	Mitchell Brown	Sandringham Dragons	TAC Cup	Geelong
1	16	Ryan Schoenmakers	Norwood	SANFL	Hawthorn
Priority	17	Sam Blease	Eastern Ranges	TAC Cup	Melbourne
Priority	18	Luke Shuey	Oakleigh Chargers	TAC Cup	West Coast
2	19	James Strauss	Oakleigh Chargers	TAC Cup	Melbourne
2	20	Tom Swift	Claremont	WAFL	West Coast
2	21	Hayden Ballantyne	Peel Thunder	WAFL	Fremantle
2	22	Jackson Trengove	Calder Cannons	TAC Cup	Port Adelaide
2	23	David Zaharakis	Northern Knights	TAC Cup	Essendon
2	24	Nick Suban	North Ballarat Rebels	TAC Cup	Fremantle
2	25	Jack Redden	Glenelg	SANFL	Brisbane Lions
2	26	Jayden Post	Western Jets	TAC Cup	Richmond
2	27	Sam Wright	Murray Bushrangers	TAC Cup	North Melbourne
2	28	Shaun McKernan	Calder Cannons	TAC Cup	Adelaide
2	29	Dayne Beams	Southport	QAFL	Collingwood
2	30	Dan Hannebery	Oakleigh Chargers	TAC Cup	Sydney
2	31	Jordan Roughead	North Ballarat Rebels	TAC Cup	Western Bulldogs
2	32	Liam Jones	North Hobart	TFL	Western Bulldogs
2	33	Tom Gillies	Dandenong Stringrays	TAC Cup	Geelong
2	34	Liam Shiels	Eastern Ranges	TAC Cup	Hawthorn
3	35	Jamie Bennell	Swan Districts	WAFL	Melbourne
3	36	Ashley Smith	Dandenong Stingrays	TAC Cup	West Coast
3	37	Zac Clarke	Oakleigh Chargers	TAC Cup	Fremantle
3	38	Matthew Broadbent	Woodville-West Torrens	SANFL	Port Adelaide
3	39	Steven Motlop	Wanderers	NTFL	Geelong
3	40	Mitch Robinson	Tasmanian Devils	VFL	Carlton
3	41	Todd Banfield	Swan Districts	WAFL	Brisbane Lions
3	42	Mitch Banner	Western Jets	TAC Cup	Port Adelaide
3	43	Liam Anthony	East Fremantle	WAFL	North Melbourne
3	44	Rory Sloane	Eastern Ranges	TAC Cup	Adelaide
3	45	Jarrad Blight	Swan Districts	WAFL	Collingwood
3	46	Luke Rounds	Geelong Falcons	TAC Cup	Collingwood
3	47	Rhys Stanley	West Adelaide	SANFL	St Kilda
3	48	Nicholas Heyne	Gippsland Power	TAC Cup	St Kilda
3	49	Taylor Hunt	Sandringham Dragons	TAC Cup	Geelong
3	50	Jordan Lisle	Oakleigh Chargers	TAC Cup	Hawthorn
4	51	Neville Jetta	Swan Districts	WAFL	Melbourne
4	52	Jordan Jones	Geelong Falcons	TAC Cup	West Coast
4	53	Michael Walters	Swan Districts	WAFL	Fremantle
4	54	Jarrad Redden	Woodville-West Torrens	SANFL	Port Adelaide
4	55	Michael Still	Northern Knights	TAC Cup	Essendon
4	56	Ben Bucovaz	Geelong Falcons	TAC Cup	Fremantle
4	57	Aaron Cornelius	Tasmanian Devils	VFL	Brisbane Lions
4	58	Tom Hislop	Essendon	AFL	Richmond
4	59	Nathan O'Keefe	Eastern Ranges	TAC Cup	North Melbourne
4	60	Tom Lee	Claremont	WAFL	Adelaide
4	61	Campbell Heath	Gippsland Power	TAC Cup	Sydney
4	62	Alistair Smith	Perth	WAFL	St Kilda
4	63	Luke Lowden	Sandringham Dragons	TAC Cup	Hawthorn
5	64	Rohan Bail	Mount Gravatt	QAFL	Melbourne
5	65	Rhys O'Keeffe	North Adelaide	SANFL	Carlton
5	66	Glenn Dawson	Woodville-West Torrens	SANFL	Port Adelaide
5	67	Tyson Slattery	West Adelaide	SANFL	Essendon
5	68	Tim Ruffles	North Ballarat Rebels	TAC Cup	Fremantle
5	69	Bart McCulloch	South Launceston	TFL	Brisbane Lions
5	70	Pass			Richmond
5	71	Warren Benjamin	Claremont	WAFL	North Melbourne
5	72	Will Young	North Ballarat Rebels	TAC Cup	Adelaide
5	73	Leigh Brown	North Melbourne	AFL	Collingwood
5	74	Paul Cahill	Sturt	SANFL	St Kilda
5	75	Shane Savage	Dandenong Stingrays	TAC Cup	Hawthorn
6	76	Pass			Melbourne
6	77	Chris Hall	Woodville-West Torrens	SANFL	Fremantle
6	78	Jason Davenport	Geelong	AFL	Port Adelaide
6	79	Pass			Essendon
6	80	Caleb Tiller	Murray Bushrangers	TAC Cup	Carlton
6	81	Kieran King	East Fremantle	WAFL	Brisbane Lions
6	82	Pass			Brisbane Lions
6	83	Colm Begley	Brisbane Lions	AFL	St Kilda
7	84	Pass			Port Adelaide
7	85	Pass			Carlton

== 2009 pre-season draft ==
The pre-season draft was held on 16 December 2008 (but is referred to as the 2009 pre-season draft in continuation from the early years of the AFL draft when it was held in January or February) and most pre-draft interest was on whether or not former West Coast Eagles captain and Brownlow Medal winner Ben Cousins would be selected by the Richmond Football Club. Richmond, the only club to show interest in recruiting Cousins, had one selection in the pre-season draft (because it had only one space left on its senior list). In the week leading up to the pre-season draft, Richmond requested to have Graham Polak (who had been hit by a tram the previous season, with it not clear at this stage whether or not the resulting injuries would end his career) moved to the rookie list, to free up an additional list space and give them a second selection in the pre-season draft. The request was similar to one made by and granted to the Essendon Football Club a few years earlier with respect to Adam Ramanauskas, but there were key differences which led to Richmond's request being rejected by the AFL and a majority of rival clubs on 15 December. Although Richmond had maintained throughout the previous week that it would draft Cousins only if its request to put Polak on the rookie list was granted, they selected Cousins anyway with their only selection in the pre-season draft. Josh Carr's return to Port Adelaide was the other major player move.

Round	Pick	Player	Recruited from	League	Club
1	1	Liam Jurrah	Yuendumu	CAFL	Melbourne
1	2	Josh Carr	Fremantle	AFL	Port Adelaide
1	3	Hayden Skipworth	Bendigo Bombers	VFL	Essendon
1	4	Chris Johnson	Melbourne	AFL	Carlton
1	5	Tom Rockliff	Murray Bushrangers	TAC Cup	Brisbane Lions
1	6	Ben Cousins	West Coast Eagles	AFL	Richmond

== 2009 rookie draft ==
Due to the expansion in the number of rookie places available for clubs to use - from the previous maximum of six players to the maximum of eight rookies and veteran listed players combined - the 2009 rookie draft featured more selections than usual.

Round	Pick	Player	Recruited from	Club
1	1	Jordie McKenzie	Geelong Falcons	Melbourne
1	2	Liam Bedford	Geelong Football Club	West Coast
1	3	Casey Sibosado	Oakleigh Chargers	Fremantle
1	4	Wade Thompson	North Adelaide	Port Adelaide
1	5	Bryce Carroll	Western Jets	Essendon
1	6	Jeff Garlett	Swan Districts	Carlton
1	7	Daniel Murray	East Perth	Brisbane Lions
1	8	Robin Nahas	Oakleigh Chargers	Richmond
1	9	Marcus White	Calder Cannons	North Melbourne
1	10	Ricky Henderson	Trentham	Adelaide
1	11	Tristan Francis	Gippsland Power	Collingwood
1	12	Kristin Thornton	Sydney Swans	Sydney
1	13	Zac Dawson	Hawthorn	St Kilda
1	14	Jamason Daniels	Murray Bushrangers	Western Bulldogs
1	15	Adam Varcoe	Central District	Geelong
1	16	Riley Milne	Murray Bushrangers	Hawthorn
2	17	Rhys Healey	Bendigo Pioneers	Melbourne
2	18	Adam Cockie	Subiaco	West Coast
2	19	Matt de Boer	Claremont	Fremantle
2	20	Danny Meyer	Richmond	Port Adelaide
2	21	Thomas German	Calder Cannons	Essendon
2	22	Luke Stanton	Northern Knights	Carlton
2	23	Pass		Brisbane Lions
2	24	David Gourdis	Richmond	Richmond
2	25	Luke Delaney	Geelong Falcons	North Melbourne
2	26	Chris Schmidt	Brisbane Lions	Adelaide
2	27	Jarryd Blair	Gippsland Power	Collingwood
2	28	Taylor Gilchrist	Sandringham Dragons	Sydney
2	29	Tom Simpkin	Geelong Falcons	St Kilda
2	30	Liam Picken	Williamstown	Western Bulldogs
2	31	Bryn Weadon	North Ballarat Rebels	Geelong
2	32	Haydn Kiel	Brisbane Lions	Hawthorn
3	33	Daniel Hughes	Melbourne	Melbourne
3	34	Hamish Shepheard	East Perth	Fremantle
3	35	Daniel Stewart	Labrador	Port Adelaide
3	36	Christian Bock	Woodville-West Torrens	Essendon
3	37	Greg Bentley	Port Adelaide	Carlton
3	38	Pass		Brisbane Lions
3	39	Andrew Browne	Murray Bushrangers	Richmond
3	40	Ben Speight	Norwood	North Melbourne
3	41	Pass		Adelaide
3	42	Johnny Bennell	Peel Thunder	Collingwood
3	43	Kyle Coney	Tyrone GAA (Ireland)	Sydney
3	44	Brad Howard	St Kilda	St Kilda
3	45	Pass		Western Bulldogs
3	46	Tom Allwright	North Hobart Demons	Geelong
3	47	Luke Breust	Temora	Hawthorn
4	48	Clancee Pearce	Swan Districts	Fremantle
4	49	Matthew Martin	West Adelaide	Port Adelaide
4	50	Kade Klemke	Murray Bushrangers	Essendon
4	51	Darren Pfeiffer	Carlton	Carlton
4	52	Pass		Brisbane Lions
4	53	Alroy Gilligan	Claremont	Richmond
4	54	Alan Obst	North Melbourne	North Melbourne
4	55	Brian Donnelly	Louth GAA (Ireland)	Adelaide
4	56	Tobais Thoolen	Collingwood	Collingwood
4	57	Mike Pyke	Canada (international rookie)	Sydney
4	58	Steven Gaertner	Dandenong Stingrays	St Kilda
4	59	Pass		Western Bulldogs
4	60	Ranga Ediriwickrama	NSW AFL scholarship program	Geelong
4	61	Carl Peterson	Richmond	Hawthorn
5	62	Jay van Berlo	West Perth	Fremantle
5	63	Jesse Laurie	Claremont	Port Adelaide
5	64	Michael Quinn	Longford GAA (Ireland)	Essendon
5	65	Lachie Hill	Carlton	Carlton
5	66	Adam Spackman	Morningside	Brisbane Lions
5	67	Pass		Richmond
5	68	Conor Meredith	Laois GAA (Ireland)	North Melbourne
5	69	Lachlan Keeffe	3-year non-registration	Collingwood
5	70	Pass		Sydney
5	71	Ross Tungatulum	St Mary's	St Kilda
5	72	Christopher Ogle	NSW AFL scholarship program	Western Bulldogs
5	73	Garry Moss	Hawthorn	Hawthorn
6	74	Greg Broughton	Subiaco	Fremantle
6	75	Pass		Port Adelaide
6	76	Sam Jacobs	Carlton	Carlton
6	77	Daniel Dzufer	Brisbane Lions	Brisbane Lions
6	78	Scott Reed	NSW AFL scholarship program	Collingwood
6	79	Pass		Sydney
6	80	Samuel McGarry	Sandringham Dragons	St Kilda
6	81	Matt Suckling	Sandringham Dragons	Hawthorn
7	82	Joel Tippett	Brisbane Lions	Brisbane Lions
7	83	Pass		Sydney
7	84	Blake McGrath	NSW AFL scholarship program	St Kilda
7	85	Will Sierakowski	NSW AFL scholarship program	Hawthorn

== Rookie elevation ==
A total of 15 players were promoted from their respective clubs' rookie lists to the club's primary lists at the conclusion of the 2008 season.

Player	Recruited from	Club
Jared Petrenko	Woodville-West Torrens	Adelaide
Scott Clouston	Morningside	Brisbane Lions
Michael Jamison	North Ballarat	Carlton
Brent Macaffer	Gippsland Power	Collingwood
Sharrod Wellingham	Perth	Collingwood
Jarrod Atkinson	Bendigo Bombers	Essendon
Austin Wonaeamirri	Norwood	Melbourne
Nathan Grima	Central District	North Melbourne
Michael Wundke	North Adelaide	North Melbourne
Nick Salter	Woodville-West Torrens	Port Adelaide
Robert Eddy	Gippsland Power	St Kilda
Andrew McQualter	Gippsland Power	St Kilda
Matt O'Dwyer	Calder Cannons	Sydney
Nick Smith	Oakleigh Chargers	Sydney
Beau Wilkes	Claremont	West Coast

== Selections by league ==
National and pre-season draft selection totals by leagues:

League	Players selected	State
TAC Cup	40	VIC
WAFL	16	WA
SANFL	13	SA
VFL	3	VIC
TFL	2	TAS
QAFL	2	QLD
NTFL	1	NT
CAFL	1	NT
