= Troy Menzel =

Australian rules footballer (born 1994)

Personal information
- Full name: Troy Menzel
- Nickname: Menz
- Born: 22 September 1994 (age 32)
- Original teams: Golden Grove; Central District (SANFL)
- Draft: No. 11, 2012 national draft
- Debut: Round 8, 2013, Carlton vs. Port Adelaide, at Etihad Stadium
- Height: 187 cm (6 ft 2 in)
- Weight: 85 kg (187 lb)
- Position: Medium forward

Playing career^{1}
Years	Club	Games (Goals)
2013–2015	Carlton	40 (47)
2016–2017	Adelaide	4 (4)
Total		44 (51)
- ^{1} Playing statistics correct to the end of 2017.

Career highlights
- 2014 AFL Rising Star nominee; SANFL premiership player: 2021

Troy Menzel (born 22 September 1994) is a former professional Australian rules footballer who played for the Carlton Football Club and Adelaide Football Club in the Australian Football League (AFL). He was drafted at pick 11 in the 2012 national draft by Carlton, and was traded to Adelaide after the 2015 season. He is the younger brother of former Geelong and Sydney player Daniel Menzel.

== Pre-AFL career ==
Menzel attended King's Baptist Grammar School, and played his junior football for the Golden Grove Football Club before joining Central District in the minor grades of the South Australian National Football League. In 2012, at age 17, Menzel was playing senior football for Centrals; he also represented South Australia at the AFL Under 18 Championships in 2012, kicking fifteen goals in two matches, but missing the rest of the games due to injury. Seen as one of the most talented players in the 2012 National Draft, several clubs were cautious about taking Menzel due to his injury-prone knees – he had suffered injuries to both knees during his junior years, and underwent a LARS reconstruction at age 16, in which the natural ligament is augmented with synthetic tissue. This saw him slide to Carlton's first pick at 11 overall, and having rated him as the second-best player in the draft, they were quick to pounce on him.

== AFL career ==
=== Carlton (2013–2015) ===
Menzel made his senior AFL debut for the club in round 8, 2013, where he was prominent in the forward line with his tackling pressure. In round 16, 2014, Menzel was nominated for the AFL Rising Star after kicking two goals in a win over St Kilda. Towards the end of 2014 he signed a new two-year contract with Carlton.

In October 2015, Menzel was traded to Adelaide in exchange for pick 28 and Sam Kerridge. He had played 40 games in three years for Carlton and kicked 47 goals.

=== Adelaide (2016–2017) ===
After failing to play a senior game in 2016, Menzel made his debut for Adelaide in round 1, 2017, against Greater Western Sydney at the Adelaide Oval. He kicked one goal and gained up 14 possessions as the Crows won by 56 points.

Menzel was delisted at the end of 2017.

== Post-AFL career ==
Menzel played for suburban club Tea Tree Gully in 2018, and was best on the ground in their grand final victory that year. This would lead to Menzel returning to Central District for two seasons before transferring to Woodville West Torrens in 2021. He was joined by his brother Daniel and together were instrumental in the Eagles winning their first ever back to back SANFL premiership. In 2025 Menzel played for the Padthaway Football Club in the Kowree Naracoorte Tatiara Football League in South East South Australia. For the 2026 season Menzel has signed on as playing coach of the Goolwa/Pt Elliot Football Club in the Great Southern Football League.

== Statistics ==
Statistics are correct to end of the 2017 season

Legend
G	Goals	K	Kicks	D	Disposals	T	Tackles
B	Behinds	H	Handballs	M	Marks

Season	Team	No.	Games	Totals							Averages (per game)						
Season	Team	No.	Games	G	B	K	H	D	M	T	G	B	K	H	D	M	T
2013	Carlton	2	7	8	6	39	12	51	19	13	1.1	0.9	5.6	1.7	7.3	2.7	1.9
2014	Carlton	2	19	26	13	130	45	175	66	28	1.4	0.7	6.8	2.4	9.2	3.5	1.5
2015	Carlton	2	14	13	7	87	43	130	46	24	0.9	0.5	6.2	3.1	9.3	3.3	1.7
2016	Adelaide	32	0	—	—	—	—	—	—	—	—	—	—	—	—	—	—
2017	Adelaide	32	4	4	3	26	12	38	10	13	1.0	0.8	6.5	3.0	9.5	2.5	3.3
Career			44	51	29	282	112	394	141	78	1.2	0.7	6.4	2.5	9.0	3.2	1.8
