= Jarrad Redden =

Australian rules footballer

Personal information
- Full name: Jarrad Redden
- Born: 27 December 1990 (age 35)
- Original team: Woodville-West Torrens Eagles (SANFL)
- Height: 205 cm (6 ft 9 in)
- Weight: 104 kg (229 lb)
- Position: Ruckman

Playing career^{1}
Years	Club	Games (Goals)
2012–2015	Port Adelaide	16 (3)
- ^{1} Playing statistics correct to the end of 2015.

Career highlights
- SANFL premiership player: 2021

Jarrad Redden (born 27 December 1990) is a former professional Australian rules footballer who played for the Port Adelaide Football Club in the Australian Football League (AFL).

== Career ==
From Yorke Peninsula, Redden played junior football for the Southern Eagles in the Yorke Peninsula Football League (YPFL) and represented South Australia at the 2008 AFL Under 18 Championships, finishing the carnival third in hit-outs and hit-outs to advantage.

Moving to Adelaide, Redden played for Woodville-West Torrens Eagles in the South Australian National Football League (SANFL) and was taken with pick 54 in the 2008 AFL draft, Redden played in the South Australian National Football League (SANFL) as ruckmen Brendon Lade, Dean Brogan and Matthew Primus were ahead of him in Port's ruck cohort. Redden played his first senior AFL match for Port Adelaide in Round 1 of the 2012 AFL season, defeating St Kilda by four points. He was subbed off this game.

The 205 cm ruckman managed 18 and 26 hitouts in his next two games, but was then sent back to his SANFL club after the return from injury of Renouf. He averaged 18.3 HOs, 11.4 disposals and 2.1 marks for the season.

Redden was delisted by Port Adelaide at the end of the 2015 AFL season.

After his delistment, Redden continued to play for Woodville-West Torrens, and was a member of their 2021 SANFL premiership team.
