= Daniel Menzel =

Australian rules footballer (born 1991)

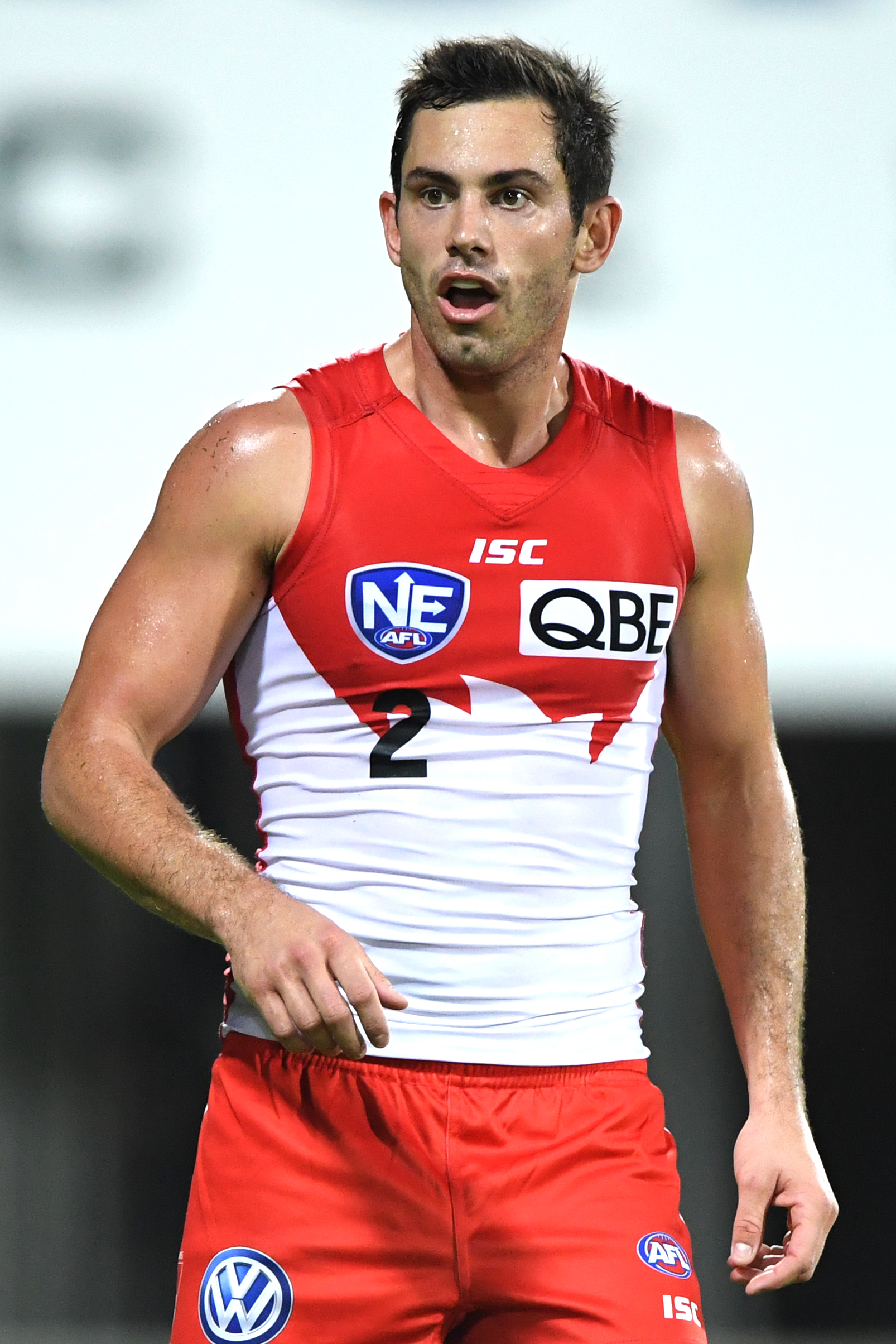
- Menzel playing for Sydney in July 2019

Personal information
- Full name: Daniel Menzel
- Born: 13 September 1991 (age 35)
- Original team: Central District (SANFL)
- Draft: No. 17, 2009 national draft
- Height: 190 cm (6 ft 3 in)
- Weight: 90 kg (198 lb)
- Position: Half-forward flank

Playing career
Years	Club	Games (Goals)
2010–2018	Geelong	73 (136)
2019	Sydney	7 (7)
Total		80 (143)

Career highlights
- 2011 AFL Rising Star: nominee; SANFL Premiership Player: 2021 Woodville West Torrens Eagles; Ken Farmer Medal: 2022

Daniel Menzel (born 13 September 1991) is a former Australian rules footballer who played for the Geelong Cats and Sydney Swans in the Australian Football League (AFL). He is the brother of fellow former player Troy Menzel.

== AFL career ==
Originally from Golden Grove, South Australia, Menzel attended King's Baptist Grammar School and played junior football for the Golden Grove Football Club, before his debut for the Central District Football Club in the SANFL, as well as representing South Australia in the 2009 AFL National Under 18 Championships, before being drafted by the Geelong Football Club with their first selection, and the 17th overall draft pick, in the 2009 AFL draft.

Playing for Geelong's VFL team for the majority of 2010, Menzel was awarded the Damien Drum Medal for a best-on-ground performance against Werribee. His AFL-level debut came in Round 20 of the 2010 AFL season in Geelong's 101-point win against the Western Bulldogs, with Menzel scoring a goal. In his follow-up match in the next round, Menzel scored three goals from three kicks, with Geelong defeating Carlton.

As a result of a four-goal performance against St Kilda in round 13 of the 2011 AFL season, Menzel received that round's nomination for the 2011 AFL Rising Star award. After performing well during the 2011 season, Menzel quickly became a crowd favourite with the Geelong supporters, drawing comparisons with star forward Steve Johnson.

In the first round of finals in 2011, Menzel ruptured his anterior cruciate ligament in his right knee. He had a knee reconstruction, and returned to VFL football in June 2012, but ruptured the ACL in his left knee in his return game, ruling him out for the rest of the season. He re-injured the knee in offseason training in December 2012, and opted to undergo LARS reconstruction surgery, in which the natural ligament is augmented with a synthetic ligament. He returned to VFL football in April 2013 but re-injured the LARS-reconstructed ligament in his second match, requiring another reconstruction, which ruled him out for the rest of the 2013 season. Menzel is believed to be one of the first AFL footballers to undergo four knee reconstructions in his career. After 3 seasons lost to knee reconstructions, Menzel returned late in 2015 season and scored 4 goals against Collingwood.

Menzel had a good season in 2017, playing 17 games in the home and away season and kicking 38 goals before being surprisingly dropped from the team in the first match of the finals.

In November 2018, Menzel joined the Sydney Swans as a delisted free agent. After playing seven matches for Sydney, he was delisted by the Swans at the conclusion of the 2019 season.

== Statistics ==
Statistics are correct to Round 23, 2019 season.

Legend
G	Goals	K	Kicks	D	Disposals	T	Tackles
B	Behinds	H	Handballs	M	Marks

Season	Team	No.	Games	Totals							Averages (per game)						
Season	Team	No.	Games	G	B	K	H	D	M	T	G	B	K	H	D	M	T
2010	Geelong	10	3	4	1	17	11	28	10	4	1.3	0.3	5.7	3.7	9.3	3.3	1.3
2011	Geelong	10	18	28	15	153	68	221	82	31	1.6	0.8	8.5	3.8	12.3	4.6	1.7
2012	Geelong	10	0	—	—	—	—	—	—	—	—	—	—	—	—	—	—
2013	Geelong	10	0	—	—	—	—	—	—	—	—	—	—	—	—	—	—
2014	Geelong	10	0	—	—	—	—	—	—	—	—	—	—	—	—	—	—
2015	Geelong	10	2	4	2	13	12	25	6	2	2.0	1.0	6.5	6.0	12.5	3.0	1.0
2016	Geelong	10	17	32	24	152	105	257	86	34	1.9	1.4	8.9	6.2	15.1	5.1	2.0
2017	Geelong	10	19	40	16	161	68	229	82	26	2.1	0.8	8.5	3.6	12.1	4.3	1.4
2018	Geelong	10	13	27	15	100	41	141	51	14	2.1	1.2	7.7	3.2	10.9	3.9	1.1
2019	Sydney	2	7	7	8	47	22	69	27	9	1.0	1.1	6.7	3.1	9.9	3.9	1.3
Career			80	143	81	648	333	981	347	120	1.8	1.0	8.1	4.2	12.3	4.3	1.5

== Post-AFL career ==
Daniel and his brother Troy joined the Woodville West Torrens Eagles in 2021. They together were instrumental in the Eagles winning their first ever back-to-back SANFL premierships. Daniel topped the Eagles goal-kicking list with 44 goals from 18 games (equal with Tyson Stengle), booting 10 goals in three finals, including four goals in the Grand Final.

During the 2023 SANFL season, Menzel left Woodville West Torrens to join Padthaway in the Kowree-Naracoorte-Tatiara Football League.

In 2024, Menzel joined the Coorong Cats in the River Murray Football League as a player-coach. He led them to premierships in both 2024 and 2025.

In October 2025 Menzel was appointed as the General Manager of Football at the Norwood Football Club in the SANFL, where he will also be the league forward line coach for 2026.
