= Jayden Post =

Australian rules footballer (born 1989)

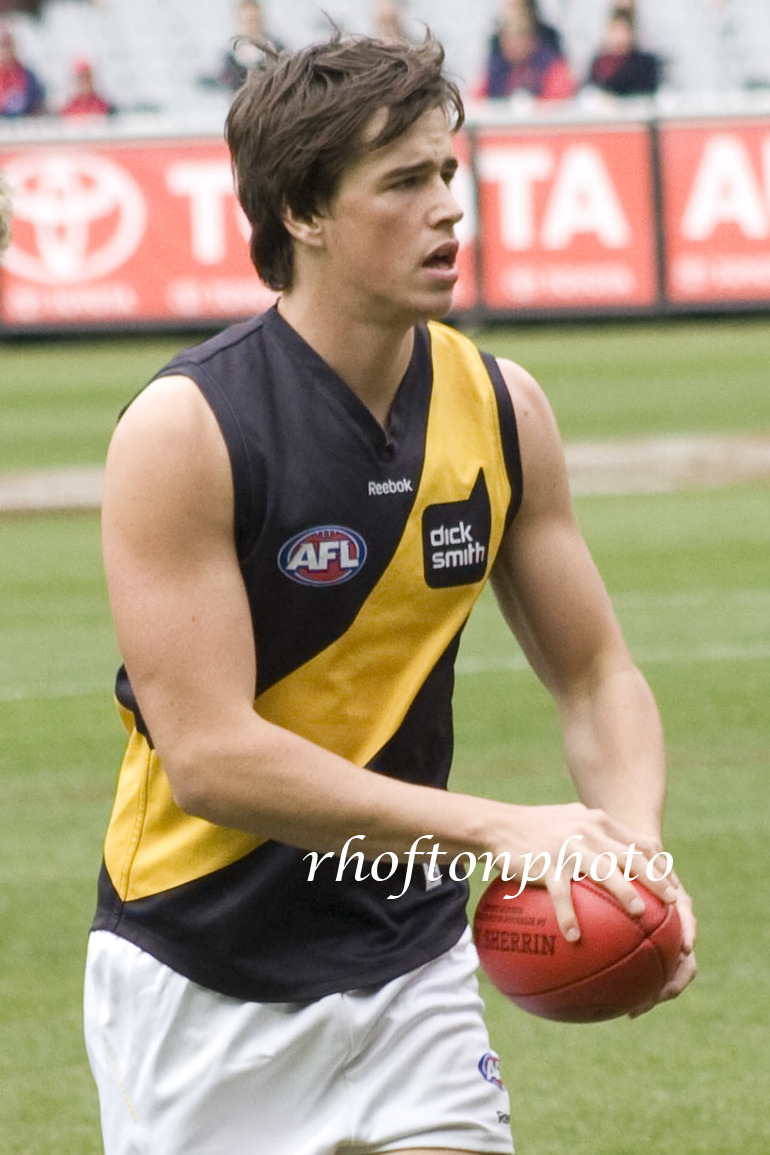
- Post in August 2009

Personal information
- Full name: Jayden Post
- Born: 5 December 1989 (age 36); Altona
- Original team: Western Jets
- Draft: 26th overall, 2008; Richmond
- Height: 195 cm (6 ft 5 in)
- Weight: 93 kg (205 lb)
- Position: Forward

Playing career^{1}
Years	Club	Games (Goals)
2009–2012	Richmond	30 (6)
- ^{1} Playing statistics correct to the end of 2012.

Jayden Post (born 5 December 1989) is an Australian rules footballer who played for the Richmond Football Club in the Australian Football League.

Post is from the Melbourne suburb of Altona and played junior football with Altona Juniors and with the Western Jets in the TAC Cup. In the 2008 season, he took both the most contested and the most uncontested marks in the TAC Cup.

Drafted with the 26th selection in the 2008 AFL draft, Post, who was a key position player with the Tigers, attempted to model his game style that of retired Richmond star, Matthew Richardson. After playing with Richmond's VFL-affiliate Coburg for the first half of the 2009 season, Post made his AFL debut in round 14 against Adelaide. Post was impressive in his third match, a draw against North Melbourne. He went on to play seven more games for the Tigers in 2009. Post also played seven senior games in 2010, spending the rest of the season with Coburg.

Post played his first AFL game for season 2011 in round nine as a late inclusion.

Post was delisted by Richmond in October 2012. He is not listed now to an AFL side. Post was not offered a contract for the 2013 season, as the Club finalised its list ahead of the National Draft.

Post plays for the Altona Football Club in the Western Region Football League.
