= Shane Savage =

Australian rules footballer (born 1991)

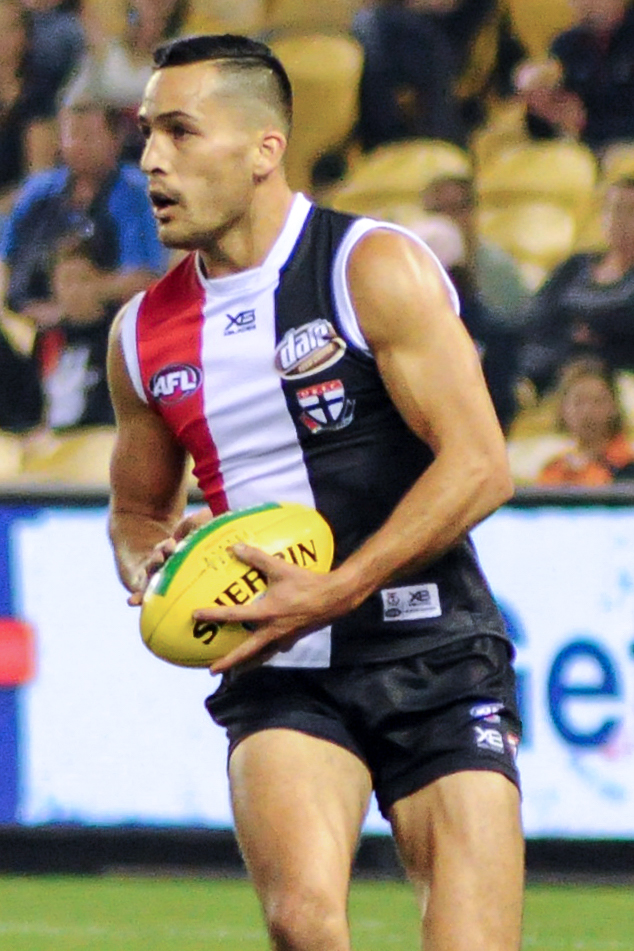
- Savage playing for St Kilda in April 2018

Personal information
- Full name: Shane Savage
- Born: 5 January 1991 (age 35); Ōtorohanga, New Zealand
- Original team: Dandenong Stingrays (TAC Cup)
- Draft: No. 75, 2008 national draft
- Debut: Round 20, 2009, Hawthorn vs. Adelaide, at Melbourne Cricket Ground
- Height: 185 cm (6 ft 1 in)
- Weight: 80 kg (176 lb)
- Position: Midfielder

Playing career^{1}
| Years | Club | Games (Goals) |
| 2009–2013 | Hawthorn | 56 (37) |
| 2014–2020 | St Kilda | 109 (26) |
| Total | | 165 (63) |
- ^{1} Playing statistics correct to the end of 2020.

Career highlights
- VFL premiership player: 2013

Shane Savage (born 5 January 1991) is a former Australian rules footballer who played with the Hawthorn Football Club and St Kilda Football Club in the Australian Football League (AFL).

== Early life ==
Born in New Zealand, Savage moved to Australia as a boy. His father is Māori and his mother is European New Zealander.

== Playing career ==
=== Hawthorn (2009–2013) ===
Savage was drafted by Hawthorn from the Dandenong Stingrays with the 75th selection (5th round) in the 2008 AFL draft. He plays as a medium-sized midfielder and wore the number 21 guernsey at Hawthorn.

Savage made his debut against Adelaide at the MCG on 14 August 2009. He had four kicks and three handpasses and also kicked a point.

Savage was nominated for the 2011 AFL Rising Star after Hawthorn's round 8 game against St Kilda. He had 26 disposals, 14 marks and kicked 2 goals in Hawthorn's 30-point win.

In the 2013 trade period, Savage was traded to St Kilda with Pick 17 for ruckman Ben McEvoy.

=== St Kilda (2014–2020) ===
Savage made his debut for St Kilda in round 1 of 2014 against Melbourne and became a regular in Alan Richardson's lineup.

By the 2020 AFL season, under new coach Brett Ratten, Savage could no longer maintain a spot in St Kilda's best 22. He was delisted after the 2020 season, his last match for the Saints being a semi-final against Richmond.

== Personal life ==
In January 2015, Savage' partner, Sarah, gave birth to their first child, a son.

== Statistics ==
Legend
| G | Goals | K | Kicks | D | Disposals | T | Tackles |
| B | Behinds | H | Handballs | M | Marks |

| Season | Team | No. | Games | Totals | | | | | | | Averages (per game) | | | | | | | Votes |
| Season | Team | No. | Games | G | B | K | H | D | M | T | G | B | K | H | D | M | T | Votes |
|---|---|---|---|---|---|---|---|---|---|---|---|---|---|---|---|---|---|---|
| 2009 | Hawthorn | 40 | 3 | 0 | 2 | 15 | 26 | 41 | 8 | 10 | 0.0 | 0.7 | 5.0 | 8.7 | 13.7 | 2.7 | 3.3 | 0 |
| 2010 | Hawthorn | 21 | 0 | — | — | — | — | — | — | — | — | — | — | — | — | — | — | — |
| 2011 | Hawthorn | 21 | 17 | 16 | 5 | 184 | 111 | 295 | 91 | 44 | 0.9 | 0.3 | 10.8 | 6.5 | 17.4 | 5.4 | 2.6 | 2 |
| 2012 | Hawthorn | 21 | 21 | 10 | 11 | 148 | 92 | 240 | 65 | 59 | 0.5 | 0.5 | 7.0 | 4.4 | 11.4 | 3.1 | 2.8 | 0 |
| 2013 | Hawthorn | 21 | 15 | 11 | 4 | 149 | 60 | 209 | 60 | 49 | 0.7 | 0.3 | 9.9 | 4.0 | 13.9 | 4.0 | 3.3 | 3 |
| 2014 | St Kilda | 5 | 14 | 3 | 2 | 157 | 95 | 252 | 51 | 30 | 0.2 | 0.1 | 11.2 | 6.8 | 18.0 | 3.6 | 2.1 | 0 |
| 2015 | St Kilda | 5 | 20 | 10 | 3 | 228 | 126 | 354 | 85 | 40 | 0.5 | 0.2 | 11.4 | 6.3 | 17.7 | 4.3 | 2.0 | 0 |
| 2016 | St Kilda | 5 | 21 | 3 | 8 | 249 | 176 | 425 | 99 | 46 | 0.1 | 0.4 | 11.9 | 8.4 | 20.2 | 4.7 | 2.2 | 0 |
| 2017 | St Kilda | 5 | 12 | 5 | 2 | 161 | 95 | 256 | 57 | 29 | 0.4 | 0.2 | 13.4 | 7.9 | 21.3 | 4.8 | 2.4 | 0 |
| 2018 | St Kilda | 5 | 18 | 2 | 5 | 256 | 142 | 398 | 95 | 34 | 0.1 | 0.3 | 14.2 | 7.9 | 22.1 | 5.3 | 1.9 | 0 |
| 2019 | St Kilda | 5 | 22 | 2 | 4 | 288 | 144 | 432 | 117 | 54 | 0.1 | 0.2 | 13.1 | 6.5 | 19.6 | 5.3 | 2.5 | 0 |
| 2020 (Note: The 2020 season was played with 17 home-and-away matches per team (down from 22) and 16-minute quarters with time on (down from 20-minute quarters with time on) due to the impact of the COVID-19 pandemic.) | St Kilda | 5 | 2 | 1 | 2 | 26 | 5 | 31 | 8 | 4 | 0.5 | 1.0 | 13.0 | 2.5 | 15.5 | 4.0 | 2.0 | 0 |
| Career | | | 165 | 63 | 46 | 1846 | 1046 | 2892 | 728 | 389 | 0.4 | 0.3 | 11.2 | 6.3 | 17.5 | 4.4 | 2.4 | 5 |

== Honours and achievements ==
Team

- 2× Minor premiership (Hawthorn): 2012, 2013
- VFL premiership player (Box Hill): 2013

Individual

- AFL Rising Star nominee: 2011
