= Jay Nash =

Jay Nash may refer to:

- Jay Nash (footballer) (born 1985), Australian rules footballer
- Jay E. Nash (1843–1915), American politician
- Jay Robert Nash (1937–2024), American author
