= Wade Thompson =

Australian rules footballer

Personal information
- Full name: Wade Thompson
- Born: 28 August 1988 (age 38); South Australia
- Original team: North Adelaide (SANFL)
- Position: Forward

Playing career^{1}
Years	Club	Games (Goals)
2009–2010	Port Adelaide	2 (0)
- ^{1} Playing statistics correct to the end of 2010.

Wade Thompson (born 28 August 1988) is a former professional Australian rules footballer who played for the Port Adelaide Football Club in the Australian Football League (AFL).

== Career ==
Known for his electrifying pace, with a good goal sense, Thompson was drafted at No. 4 in the 2009 AFL Rookie draft from South Australian National Football League (SANFL) club North Adelaide.

After played in the opening round 2009 NAB Cup game against the Sydney Swans in which scored three goals, Thompson continued to impress during the preseason and was elevated to the senior squad as a replacement for Jackson Trengove, who was placed on the long-term injury list.

In round 3 2009 Thompson made his AFL debut for Port Adelaide against Melbourne, becoming one of six Indigenous Australians in Port's side, equaling the record for the most Indigenous players in a single AFL team.

Although he didn't impress like he did during the preseason, Thompson played a satisfactory game in the forward line with 3 kicks, 6 handballs, 3 marks and 1 goal assist. The following week he played his first and last away game, contributing with 6 kicks, 7 handballs, 3 marks and 1 tackle.

Thompson played in the first round of the 2010 NAB Cup and collected 14 disposals and kicked two goals. A week later, Thompson was injured during training when teammate Marlon Motlop accidentally elbowed him in the face, fracturing his eye socket. Thompson required surgery, with a plate inserted into his eye socket and missed twelve weeks.

He was delisted by the Power at the end of the 2010.
