= Nathan O'Keefe =

Australian rules footballer

Personal information
- Full name: Nathan O'Keefe
- Born: 17 August 1990 (age 36)
- Original team: Eastern Ranges (TAC Cup)
- Draft: No. 59 2008 AFL draft
- Height: 193 cm (6 ft 4 in)
- Weight: 90 kg (198 lb)

Playing career^{1}
Years	Club	Games (Goals)
2010	North Melbourne	2 (1)
- ^{1} Playing statistics correct to the end of 2010.

Nathan O'Keefe (born 17 August 1990) is an Australian rules football player who played for the North Melbourne Football Club in the Australian Football League. He was drafted to North Melbourne with pick 59 in the 2008 AFL national draft after playing for the Eastern Ranges in the TAC Cup. He missed part of the 2010 pre-season due to glandular fever but returned to make his debut midway through the year. However he would only play one more AFL game before he was delisted at the end of the 2010 season.
