= Alistair Smith (Australian footballer) =

Australian rules footballer (born 1990)

Personal information
- Full name: Alistair Smith
- Born: 8 August 1990 (age 36)
- Original team: Perth / Northam
- Draft: 62nd overall, 2008 National draft
- Height: 184 cm (6 ft 0 in)
- Weight: 83 kg (183 lb)
- Position: Midfielder

Playing career^{1}
| Years | Club | Games (Goals) |
| 2009–2011 | St Kilda | 3 (0) |
- ^{1} Playing statistics correct to the end of 2011.

Alistair Smith (born 8 August 1990) is an Australian rules footballer who played for the St Kilda Football Club in the Australian Football League (AFL). He also played for Perth in the West Australian Football League (WAFL).

== AFL career ==
Alistair Smith was recruited from Perth in the 2008 AFL draft by St Kilda, with their fourth round selection (number 62 overall).

Smith played regularly with St Kilda's Victorian Football League (VFL) affiliate team Sandringham and spent 2009 and 2010 developing his career with the Zebras in the VFL.

Smith played three games in the 2010 NAB Cup. The young midfielder was impressive in St Kilda's first NAB Cup match—he had 18 possessions and was named in the Saints' best. Smith was named emergency six times during the home and away season in 2010.

Smith made his debut for St Kilda against Essendon at Docklands Stadium on 10 April 2011, in round 3 of the 2011 AFL season. He gathered 16 disposals on debut.

Alistair Smith was delisted by St Kilda at the end of the 2011 season.
