= Marcus White =

Australian rules footballer

Personal information
- Full name: Marcus White
- Born: 24 October 1990 (age 36)
- Original team: Calder Cannons (TAC Cup)
- Draft: No. 9, 2008 National Draft, North Melbourne
- Height: 185 cm (6 ft 1 in)
- Weight: 80 kg (176 lb)

Playing career^{1}
Years	Club	Games (Goals)
2010	North Melbourne	2 (0)
- ^{1} Playing statistics correct to the end of 2010.

Marcus White (born 26 October 1991) is a former professional Australian rules football player at the North Melbourne Football Club in the Australian Football League (AFL). He made his first appearance at the senior level in the 2010 AFL season. White made his debut in Round 18, against the Western Bulldogs.
