= Liam Jones =

Australian rules footballer (born 1991)

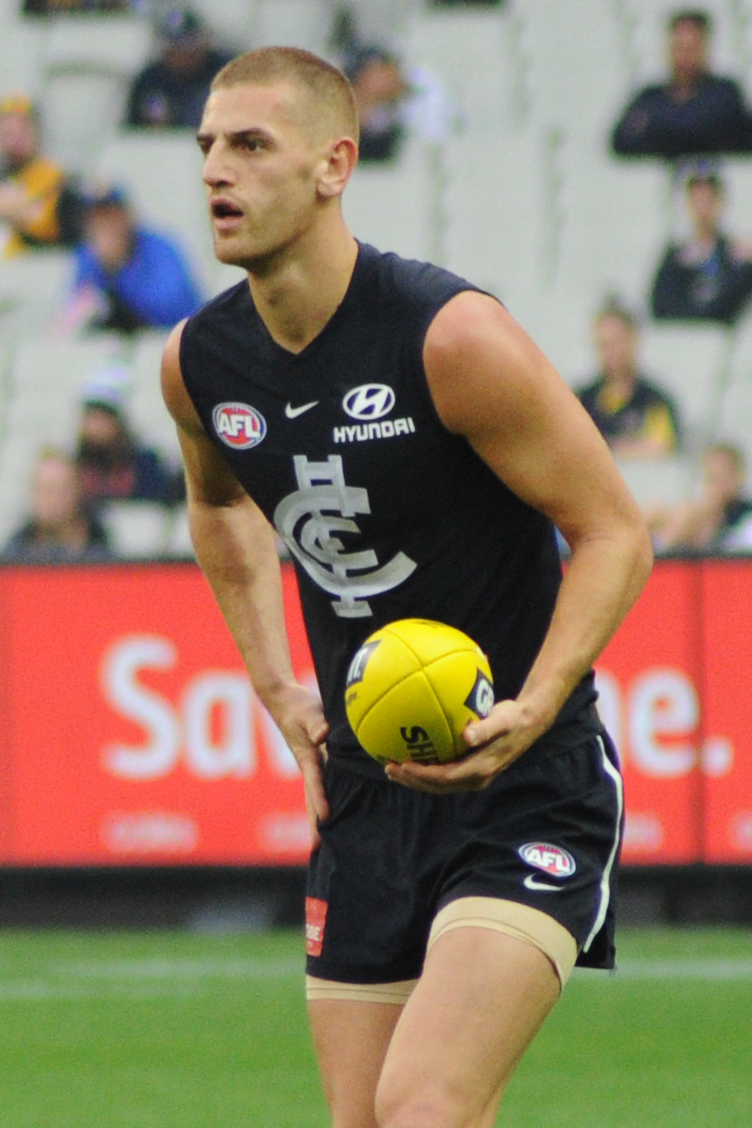
- Jones in 2018

Personal information
- Full name: Liam Jones
- Born: 24 February 1991 (age 35); Hobart, Tasmania
- Original teams: North Hobart (Tas); Scotch College (APS)
- Draft: No. 32, 2008 National Draft
- Height: 198 cm (6 ft 6 in)
- Weight: 98 kg (216 lb)
- Position: Key Defender

Playing career
| Years | Club | Games (Goals) |
| 2009–2014 | Western Bulldogs | 66 (68) |
| 2015–2021 | Carlton | 95 (16) |
| 2023–2025 | Western Bulldogs | 44 (0) |
| 2027– | Gold Coast | 0 (0) |
| Total | | 205 (84) |

Representative team honours
| Years | Team | Games (Goals) |
| 2013 | Indigenous All-Stars | 1 (2) |

Career highlights
- 2011 AFL Rising Star nominee; 2x VFL premiership player: 2014, 2025

Liam Jones (born 24 February 1991) is a former professional Australian rules footballer who played for the Western Bulldogs and Carlton in the Australian Football League (AFL).

He was drafted by the Western Bulldogs in the second round of the 2008 AFL draft, and made his senior debut in 2010. After six seasons on the Bulldogs list, Jones was traded to the Carlton Football Club. Originally a key forward, Jones' switch to Carlton saw a revitalisation for his career when he moved into a key defensive position.

== Early life ==
Growing up in Tasmania, Liam played his junior football with North Hobart Football Club before being selected to represent Tasmania's U18s. An Indigenous Australian, Jones's father Bob Jones was also a professional footballer, playing with St Kilda. Jones attended Scotch College, Melbourne as part of the school's indigenous program. From years 7–10 he attended Dominic College in Hobart.

== AFL career ==
=== Western Bulldogs (2008–2014) ===
At the 2008 National Draft, Liam was drafted with pick #32 by the Western Bulldogs. He spent the 2009 season in the reserves as he was only 17. He made his debut against North Melbourne in round 18 of the 2010 season, and averaged 9.4 disposals from 5 games in his debut season.

In round 24, 2011, he was nominated for the AFL Rising Star award. He was nominated after playing in his team's win against Fremantle where he scored 2 goals. He also got 9 disposals and 4 marks.

Jones showed promise and recorded good stats but remained on the fringes of a falling Western Bulldogs side. His stat averages were increasing but he still found himself being picked in fewer games.

=== Carlton (2015–2021) ===
Liam Jones was traded to the Carlton Football Club during the 2014 trade period in exchange for pick 46. That pick ended up being used to draft Caleb Daniel. Signed on a three-year deal as a key forward, the start of Jones' career at Carlton was met with erratic form. He only managed nine games in his first season with the Blues, and eight in his second, for an inaccurate and unremarkable return of only 16 goals from 32 scores. The highlight of his time in the Carlton forward-line was two crucial goals in the final quarter of the Round 5, 2016 upset 4-point win against Fremantle.

2017 was the final year of Jones' initial three-year contract with the Blues, and few – Jones included – expected him to play much senior football or be in any serious contention for a new contract. Early in the season at Carlton's VFL-affiliate, the Northern Blues, Jones' position was switched from the forward line to defence to full back, largely to clear the way for Carlton's newly drafted key forwards to develop. Within a month he had begun to excel in the role of shutting down the opposition's best key forward, and he was recalled to the senior team in Round 12, immediately making an impact as an AFL defender. His performances in the second half of the year drew a lot attention and praise, as well as a top-ten finish in the club's best and fairest. He recorded an elite level of spoils per game (10.7) largely due to his preference to punch the ball away instead of attempt a mark (he only recorded 5.1 marks a game). He continued this form into the next season with 7.6 spoils a game, 5.4 marks (1.5 contested, 3.6 intercept) per game, and helped the team with 8.7 one percenters a game.

Jones signed a two-year contract extension during 2017 that would see him at Carlton until the end of 2019. He missed eight weeks with a nasty concussion after a head clash during the 2019 season, but recovered and soon afterwards signed another three-year extension with Carlton to the end of 2022. He continued to excel in a key defensive stopping role in the Carlton defence, and recorded five consecutive top-ten finishes in the club's best and fairest from 2017 to 2021.

In November 2021, during the AFL’s off-season, Jones’ position at the club (and his career) was made vulnerable after it was revealed that he was opposed to the COVID-19 vaccine mandate for all AFL players which saw the potential of a player being sacked for not getting vaccinated by mid-February. He ultimately retired days later with a year remaining on his contract at the Blues amid news of his reluctance on getting the vaccine.

=== Return to the Western Bulldogs (2023–2025) ===
During his AFL hiatus, Jones moved to the Gold Coast to play for Palm Beach Currumbin in the QAFL. After the AFL lifted its vaccine mandate during the 2022 AFL season, he rejoined the Bulldogs as a free agent during the 2022 trade period, signing a three-year deal, starting in 2023.

Jones became the Bulldogs' number-one key defender, and after arguably a career-best year in 2024, Jones was selected for 2025's Indigenous All-Stars match, his second squad selection following 2013. However, Jones was ruled out of the pre-season match against Fremantle following a hamstring strain at training, also ruling the defender out for the beginning of the AFL season.

After falling out of favour and only playing 5 matches for the season, Jones was delisted by the Bulldogs at the end of the 2025 AFL season.

== Statistics ==
Legend
| G | Goals | K | Kicks | D | Disposals | T | Tackles |
| B | Behinds | H | Handballs | M | Marks |

| Season | Team | No. | Games | Totals | | | | | | | Averages (per game) | | | | | | | Votes |
| Season | Team | No. | Games | G | B | K | H | D | M | T | G | B | K | H | D | M | T | Votes |
|---|---|---|---|---|---|---|---|---|---|---|---|---|---|---|---|---|---|---|
| 2010 | Western Bulldogs | 19 | 5 | 6 | 2 | 37 | 10 | 47 | 20 | 11 | 1.2 | 0.4 | 7.4 | 2.0 | 9.4 | 4.0 | 2.2 | 0 |
| 2011 | Western Bulldogs | 19 | 20 | 19 | 10 | 136 | 60 | 196 | 96 | 38 | 1.0 | 0.5 | 6.8 | 3.0 | 9.8 | 4.8 | 1.9 | 0 |
| 2012 | Western Bulldogs | 19 | 12 | 9 | 9 | 75 | 33 | 108 | 41 | 19 | 0.8 | 0.8 | 6.3 | 2.8 | 9.0 | 3.4 | 1.6 | 0 |
| 2013 | Western Bulldogs | 19 | 19 | 22 | 15 | 107 | 54 | 161 | 77 | 28 | 1.2 | 0.8 | 5.6 | 2.8 | 8.5 | 4.1 | 1.5 | 0 |
| 2014 | Western Bulldogs | 19 | 10 | 12 | 4 | 59 | 41 | 100 | 35 | 19 | 1.2 | 0.4 | 5.9 | 4.1 | 10.0 | 3.5 | 1.9 | 2 |
| 2015 | Carlton | 14 | 9 | 7 | 9 | 46 | 19 | 65 | 31 | 18 | 0.8 | 1.0 | 5.1 | 2.1 | 7.2 | 3.4 | 2.0 | 0 |
| 2016 | Carlton | 14 | 8 | 9 | 7 | 44 | 34 | 78 | 24 | 18 | 1.1 | 0.9 | 5.5 | 4.3 | 9.8 | 3.0 | 2.3 | 0 |
| 2017 | Carlton | 14 | 12 | 0 | 0 | 95 | 40 | 135 | 56 | 34 | 0.0 | 0.0 | 7.9 | 3.3 | 11.3 | 4.7 | 2.8 | 5 |
| 2018 | Carlton | 14 | 17 | 0 | 1 | 124 | 56 | 180 | 92 | 39 | 0.0 | 0.1 | 7.3 | 3.3 | 10.6 | 5.4 | 2.3 | 0 |
| 2019 | Carlton | 14 | 13 | 0 | 0 | 87 | 29 | 116 | 62 | 28 | 0.0 | 0.0 | 6.7 | 2.2 | 8.9 | 4.8 | 2.2 | 0 |
| 2020 (Note: The 2020 season was played with 17 home-and-away matches per team (down from 22) and 16-minute quarters with time on (down from 20-minute quarters with time on) due to the impact of the COVID-19 pandemic.) | Carlton | 14 | 17 | 0 | 2 | 111 | 24 | 135 | 72 | 24 | 0.0 | 0.1 | 6.5 | 1.4 | 7.9 | 4.2 | 1.4 | 1 |
| 2021 | Carlton | 14 | 19 | 0 | 1 | 178 | 41 | 219 | 105 | 19 | 0.0 | 0.1 | 9.4 | 2.2 | 11.5 | 5.5 | 1.0 | 1 |
| 2023 | Western Bulldogs | 19 | 18 | 0 | 0 | 129 | 37 | 166 | 89 | 16 | 0.0 | 0.0 | 7.2 | 2.1 | 9.2 | 4.9 | 0.9 | 0 |
| 2024 | Western Bulldogs | 19 | 21 | 0 | 1 | 184 | 60 | 244 | 122 | 10 | 0.0 | 0.0 | 8.8 | 2.9 | 11.6 | 5.8 | 0.5 | 3 |
| 2025 | Western Bulldogs | 19 | 5 | 0 | 0 | 34 | 13 | 47 | 21 | 7 | 0.0 | 0.0 | 6.8 | 2.6 | 9.4 | 4.2 | 1.4 | 0 |
| Career | | | 205 | 84 | 61 | 1446 | 551 | 1997 | 943 | 328 | 0.4 | 0.3 | 7.1 | 2.7 | 9.7 | 4.6 | 1.6 | 12 |
