= List of Brisbane Lions individual awards and records =

This is a list of individual awards won by the players and coaches of the Brisbane Lions' AFL team, the merger of the Fitzroy Lions and the Brisbane Bears, and its AFL Women's and reserves teams (QAFL/NEAFL/VFL).

== AFL awards and records ==
=== External awards ===
==== Brownlow Medal ====
Jason Akermanis (2001)
Simon Black (2002)
Lachie Neale (2020, 2023)

==== Brownlow Medal runner-up ====
Simon Black (2007, 2008)
Lachie Neale (2022)

==== Norm Smith Medal ====
Shaun Hart (2001)
Simon Black (2003)
Will Ashcroft (2024, 2025)

==== Coleman Medal ====
Jonathan Brown (2007)

==== Indigenous Team of the Century (2005) ====
Chris Johnson
Darryl White
Michael McLean

==== All-Australian team ====
Jason Akermanis (1999, 2001, 2002, 2004)
Justin Leppitsch (1999, 2002, 2003)
Michael Voss (1999, 2001, 2002 – captain, 2003 – captain)
Simon Black (2001, 2002, 2004)
Nigel Lappin (2001, 2002, 2003, 2004)
Leigh Matthews (2001, 2002, 2003) – coach
Chris Johnson (2002, 2004)
Luke Power (2004)
Jonathan Brown (2007 – vice-captain, 2009)
Tom Rockliff (2014)
Dayne Zorko (2017, 2024)
Harris Andrews (2019, 2020, 2025, 2026)
Charlie Cameron (2019, 2023)
Lachie Neale (2019, 2020, 2022, 2024)
Daniel Rich (2021)
Hugh McCluggage (2025)
Zac Bailey (2025, 2026)
Logan Morris (2026)

===== Members of extended squads but not final teams =====
Jed Adcock (2007)
Nigel Lappin (2007)
Simon Black (2008)
Daniel Bradshaw (2008)
Jonathan Brown (2008)
Mitch Clark (2009)
Harris Andrews (2018, 2023, 2024)
Dayne Beams (2018)
Hugh McCluggage (2019, 2020, 2021, 2022)
Dayne Zorko (2019, 2021, 2025)
Charlie Cameron (2021, 2022, 2026)
Jarryd Lyons (2021)
Joe Daniher (2023, 2024)
Lachie Neale (2023, 2026)
Cameron Rayner (2024)
Josh Dunkley (2025)
Will Ashcroft (2026)

==== AFL Rising Star ====
Daniel Rich (2009)
Lewis Taylor (2014)

===== Nominations =====
Year	Round	Player
1997	8	Daniel Bradshaw
1998	2	Luke Power
1999	1	Shane O'Bree
1999	9	Simon Black
1999	17	Luke Power
1999	21	Tim Notting
2000	13	Beau McDonald
2001	1	Damian Cupido
2001	19	Robert Copeland
2002	21	Jamie Charman
2003	4	Jared Brennan
2003	22	Ashley McGrath
2004	12	Richard Hadley
2005	6	Justin Sherman
2005	12	Jed Adcock
2005	15	Troy Selwood
2005	17	Anthony Corrie
2006	8	Michael Rischitelli
2006	13	Cheynee Stiller
2006	15	Matthew Moody
2007	2	Cameron Wood
2007	9	Mitch Clark
2008	21	Bradd Dalziell
2009	1	**Daniel Rich**
2010	6	Todd Banfield
2010	13	Tom Rockliff
2010	15	Jack Redden
2012	1	Claye Beams
2012	8	Mitch Golby
2013	12	Sam Mayes
2014	6	James Aish
2014	9	**Lewis Taylor**
2014	19	Darcy Gardiner
2015	18	Harris Andrews
2017	5	Eric Hipwood
2017	14	Hugh McCluggage
2017	17	Alex Witherden
2018	9	Alex Witherden
2018	15	Cameron Rayner
2019	20	Noah Answerth
2020	13	Brandon Starcevich
2021	15	Deven Robertson
2023	2	Will Ashcroft
2023	14	Darcy Wilmot
2023	19	Jaspa Fletcher
2024	10	Kai Lohmann
2024	15	Logan Morris
2025	4	Levi Ashcroft
2026	16	Ty Gallop

- **Bold** players denote winners of the Rising Star. No Brisbane Lions players were nominated in 2011, 2016 or 2022.

==== AFL Players Association awards ====
===== Leigh Matthews Trophy =====
Michael Voss (2002, 2003)
Lachie Neale (2020)

===== Best First Year Player Award =====
Daniel Rich (2009)

===== Best Captain Award =====
Michael Voss (2001, 2002, 2003, 2004)
Jonathan Brown (2007, 2009)

===== Robert Rose Award for Most Courageous Player =====
Michael Voss (2001)
Jonathan Brown (2007, 2008, 2011)
Josh Dunkley (2025)

===== Education and Training Excellence Award =====
Darcy Fort (2023)
Noah Answerth (2024)

===== Madden Medal =====
Luke Power (2012)

===== 22 Under 22 team =====
Jack Redden (2012)
Harris Andrews (2017, 2018, 2019 – captain)
Eric Hipwood (2017, 2018, 2019)
Alex Witherden (2018, 2019)
Hugh McCluggage (2019, 2020)
Zac Bailey (2021)
Brandon Starcevich (2021)
Keidean Coleman (2022)
Will Ashcroft (2023, 2025, 2026)
Darcy Wilmot (2024, 2025, 2026)
Levi Ashcroft (2025)
Jaspa Fletcher (2025, 2026)
Logan Morris (2025, 2026)

====== Members of extended squads but not final teams ======
Mitch Golby (2013)
Jack Redden (2013)
James Aish (2014)
Ryan Lester (2014)
Lewis Taylor (2014, 2015, 2017)
Justin Clarke (2015)
Marco Paparone (2015)
Harris Andrews (2016)
Hugh McCluggage (2018)
Jarrod Berry (2019, 2020)
Zac Bailey (2020)
Cameron Rayner (2022)
Darcy Wilmot (2023)
Kai Lohmann (2024)
Levi Ashcroft (2026)

==== Mark of the Year ====
Jonathan Brown (2002)

==== Goal of the Year ====
Jarrod Molloy (1999)
Jason Akermanis (2002)
Will Ashcroft (2023)
Conor McKenna (2026)

==== Michael Tuck Medal ====
Daniel Rich (2013)

==== International Rules Australian representatives ====
Marcus Ashcroft (1999)
Craig McRae (1999)
Jarrod Molloy (1999)
Jason Akermanis (1999, 2000)
Justin Leppitsch (1999, 2000)
Luke Power (2000, 2003)
Simon Black (2001)
Nigel Lappin (2001)
Chris Scott (2001)
Darryl White (2001)
Brad Scott (2002)
Chris Johnson (2002, 2003, 2005)
Mal Michael (2004)
Justin Sherman (2006)
Michael Voss (2006)
Jared Brennan (2008)
Todd Banfield (2010)
Joel Patfull (2011)
Ashley McGrath (2013)
Tom Rockliff (2014, 2015)
Dayne Zorko (2017)

==== Jim Stynes Medal ====
Jason Akermanis (1999)
Ashley McGrath (2013)

==== AFL Coaches Association awards ====
===== Champion Player of the Year Award =====
Lachie Neale (2020)

===== Allan Jeans Senior Coach of the Year Award =====
Chris Fagan (2019, 2024, 2025)

===== Coaching Legend Award =====
Leigh Matthews (2013)

===== Career & Education Award =====
Mitch Hahn (2017)

==== Australian Football Media Association Player of the Year ====
Michael Voss (2001)

==== Herald Sun Player of the Year ====
Simon Black (2001)
Michael Voss (2003)

==== Lou Richards Medal ====
Michael Voss (2001)
Lachie Neale (2020)

==== Australian Football Hall of Fame ====
===== Legends =====
Leigh Matthews (inducted 1996)

===== Inductees =====
Michael Voss (inducted 2011)
Jason Akermanis (inducted 2015)
Nigel Lappin (inducted 2016)
Simon Black (inducted 2020)
Jonathan Brown (inducted 2020)

==== AFL Queensland awards ====
===== Joe Grant Medal =====
Ben Robbins (2001)
Claye Beams (2012)
Jack Crisp (2013)

===== Queensland Football Team of the Century (2003) =====
Jason Akermanis
Marcus Ashcroft
Scott McIvor
Mal Michael
Michael Voss (captain)

===== Hall of Fame =====
====== Legends ======
Leigh Matthews
Michael Voss

====== Inductees ======
Jason Akermanis
Marcus Ashcroft
Brisbane Lions 2001–03 (Leigh Matthews, Jason Akermanis, Marcus Ashcroft, Simon Black, Daniel Bradshaw, Jonathan Brown, Blake Caracella, Jamie Charman, Robert Copeland, Richard Hadley, Shaun Hart, Des Headland, Chris Johnson, Clark Keating, Nigel Lappin, Justin Leppitsch, Alastair Lynch, Beau McDonald, Ashley McGrath, Craig McRae, Mal Michael, Tim Notting, Martin Pike, Luke Power, Brad Scott, Chris Scott, Aaron Shattock, Michael Voss, Darryl White)
Danny Dickfos
Clark Keating
Matthew Kennedy
Steven Lawrence
Scott McIvor
Roger Merrett
Mal Michael

==== NEAFL awards ====
===== Andrew Ireland Medal =====
Sam Michael (2012)
Jesse O'Brien (2013)
Ben Keays (2017)
Matt Eagles (2019)

===== Team of the Year =====
Amon Buchanan (2011 – Northern Conference)
James Hawksley (2012 – Northern Conference)
Cheynee Stiller (2012 – Northern Conference)
Stephen Wrigley (2012 – Northern Conference)
Jack Crisp (2013 – Northern Conference)
Patrick Karnezis (2013 – Northern Conference)
Zac O'Brien (2014, 2015)
Jonathan Freeman (2017)
Oscar McInerney (2017)
Liam Dawson (2018)
Ryan Bastinac (2019)
Matt Eagles (2019)
Mitch Hahn (2019 – coach)
Ben Keays (2019)
Corey Lyons (2019)

==== VFL awards ====
===== J. J. Liston Trophy =====
Jarryd Lyons (2023)

===== Team of the Year =====
Rhys Mathieson (2022)
Jarryd Lyons (2023, 2024)
Deven Robertson (2024, 2025)
Will McLachlan (2024, 2025)

====== Members of extended squads but not final teams ======
Ryan Lester (2022)
Kai Lohmann (2023)
Jaxon Prior (2023)

=== Club awards ===
==== Best and fairest (Merrett–Murray Medal) ====
Awarded 1997–present.

1997: Matthew Clarke
1998: Chris Scott
1999: Jason Akermanis/Justin Leppitsch
2000: Michael Voss
2001: Simon Black/Michael Voss
2002: Simon Black
2003: Michael Voss
2004: Nigel Lappin
2005: Jason Akermanis
2006: Simon Black
2007: Jonathan Brown
2008: Jonathan Brown
2009: Jonathan Brown
2010: Michael Rischitelli
2011: Tom Rockliff
2012: Joel Patfull
2013: Joel Patfull
2014: Tom Rockliff
2015: Dayne Beams/Stefan Martin/Mitch Robinson/Dayne Zorko
2016: Dayne Zorko
2017: Dayne Zorko
2018: Dayne Zorko
2019: Lachie Neale
2020: Lachie Neale
2021: Dayne Zorko
2022: Lachie Neale
2023: Harris Andrews
2024: Lachie Neale
2025: Josh Dunkley
2026: Will Ashcroft

==== Merrett–Murray Medal runner-up ====
Awarded 1997–1998, 2000, 2002–2003, 2009–2014 and 2016–present, as "Runner-up Club Champion" from 1997–1998, in 2000 and from 2002–2003 and as "Nigel Lappin Trophy" from 2009–2014 and from 2016–present. An asterisk denotes that the award was not given that year, but the player placed second in the Merrett–Murray Medal vote count.

1997: Nigel Lappin
1998: Marcus Ashcroft
2000: Nigel Lappin
2002: Michael Voss
2003: Simon Black/Luke Power
2004: Luke Power*
2005: Chris Johnson*
2006: Justin Sherman*
2007: Jed Adcock*
2008: Simon Black*
2009: Simon Black
2010: Simon Black
2011: Simon Black
2012: Daniel Rich
2013: Pearce Hanley
2014: Dayne Zorko
2016: Mitch Robinson
2017: Dayne Beams
2018: Dayne Beams
2019: Dayne Zorko
2020: Jarryd Lyons
2021: Hugh McCluggage
2022: Hugh McCluggage
2023: Lachie Neale
2024: Dayne Zorko
2025: Hugh McCluggage
2026: Josh Dunkley

==== Merrett–Murray Medal third place ====
Awarded 1997–2002, 2009–2014 and 2016–present, as "Third Place Club Champion" from 1997–2002 and as "Alastair Lynch Trophy" from 2009–2014 and 2016–present. An asterisk denotes that the award was not given that year, but the player placed third in the Merrett–Murray Medal vote count.

1997: Marcus Ashcroft
1998: Matthew Kennedy
1999: Marcus Ashcroft
2000: Justin Leppitsch
2001: Nigel Lappin
2002: Marcus Ashcroft/Brad Scott
2004: Simon Black*
2005: Jed Adcock*
2006: Luke Power*
2007: Tim Notting*
2008: Luke Power*
2009: Mitch Clark
2010: Jonathan Brown
2011: Jack Redden
2012: Pearce Hanley
2013: Jack Redden
2014: Joel Patfull
2016: Stefan Martin
2017: Tom Rockliff
2018: Stefan Martin
2019: Hugh McCluggage
2020: Hugh McCluggage
2021: Jarryd Lyons
2022: Brandon Starcevich
2023: Hugh McCluggage
2024: Josh Dunkley
2025: Will Ashcroft
2026: Lachie Neale

==== Team of the Decade ====
In June 2006, to recognise ten years since the creation of the Brisbane Lions, a Team of the Decade was announced.

**Team of the Decade**
Backs:	Chris Johnson	Mal Michael	Darryl White
Half-Backs:	Marcus Ashcroft	Justin Leppitsch	Chris Scott
Midfielders:	Nigel Lappin	Michael Voss (c)	Brad Scott
Half-Forwards:	Jason Akermanis	Jonathan Brown	Craig McRae
Forwards:	Luke Power	Alastair Lynch	Daniel Bradshaw
Followers:	Clark Keating	Simon Black	Shaun Hart
Interchange:	Martin Pike	Tim Notting	Jamie Charman	Richard Champion
Coach:	Leigh Matthews

==== Leading club goalkicker ====
Awarded 1997–present. Bold text denotes player won Coleman Medal by the being the AFL's leading goalkicker after the home-and-away season. Players in Italic text denotes player was the AFL's leading goalkicker after finals.

1997: Justin Leppitsch (49 goals)
1998: Justin Leppitsch (26)
1999: Craig McRae (40)
2000: Alastair Lynch (61)
2001: Alastair Lynch (54)
2002: Alastair Lynch (58)
2003: Alastair Lynch (62)
2004: Jason Akermanis (40)
2005: Daniel Bradshaw (42)
2006: Daniel Bradshaw (59)
2007: Jonathan Brown (77)
2008: Daniel Bradshaw (75)
2009: Jonathan Brown (78)
2010: Jonathan Brown (53)
2011: Mitch Clark (27)
2012: Jonathan Brown (47)
2013: Jonathan Brown (28)
2014: Josh Green (33)
2015: Josh Green (25)
2016: Dayne Zorko (23)
2017: Dayne Zorko (34)
2018: Eric Hipwood (37)
2019: Charlie Cameron (57)
2020: Charlie Cameron (31)
2021: Charlie Cameron (55)
2022: Charlie Cameron (54)
2023: Joe Daniher (61)
2024: Joe Daniher (58)
2025: Logan Morris (53)
2026: Logan Morris (72)

==== Clubman award ====
Awarded 1997–1998 and 2005, as 'Clubman of the Year' from 1997–1998 and as 'Best Clubman' in 2005.

1997: Jarrod Molloy
1998: Matthew Clarke
2005: Jonathan Brown/Dylan McLaren

==== Rookie of the Year ====
Awarded 1997–present, as 'Best First Year Player' in 1997, 'Brian Powell Memorial Best First Year Player' in 1998, 'Brian Powell Memorial Rookie of the Year' from 1999–2001 and 'Rookie of the Year' from 2002–present.

1997: Daniel Bradshaw
1998: Simon Black
1999: Simon Black
2000: Beau McDonald
2001: Robert Copeland
2002: Jamie Charman
2003: Ashley McGrath
2004: Richard Hadley
2005: Jed Adcock
2006: Justin Sherman
2007: Colm Begley
2008: Bradd Dalziell
2009: Daniel Rich
2010: Tom Rockliff
2011: Patrick Karnezis
2012: Dayne Zorko
2013: Sam Mayes
2014: Lewis Taylor
2015: Harris Andrews
2016: Josh Schache
2017: Eric Hipwood
2018: Alex Witherden
2019: Noah Answerth
2020: Brandon Starcevich
2021: Keidean Coleman
2022: Darcy Wilmot
2023: Will Ashcroft
2024: Logan Morris
2025: Levi Ashcroft
2026: Ty Gallop

==== Most professional player ====
Awarded 1997–present, as 'Don Smith Most Professional Player' from 1997–2003, as 'Most Professional Player' from 2004–2008 and as 'Marcus Ashcroft Most Professional Player' from 2009–present.

1997: Marcus Ashcroft
1998: Matthew Kennedy
1999: Chris Scott
2000: Michael Voss
2001: Jason Akermanis
2002: Craig McRae
2003: Michael Voss
2004: Michael Voss
2005: Jonathan Brown
2006: Michael Voss
2007: Robert Copeland
2008: Daniel Bradshaw
2009: Jonathan Brown
2010: Daniel Merrett
2011: Jed Adcock
2012: Andrew Raines
2013: Matthew Leuenberger
2014: Michael Close
2015: Ryan Lester
2016: Tom Cutler
2017: Harris Andrews
2018: Harris Andrews
2019: Harris Andrews
2020: Harris Andrews
2021: Oscar McInerney
2022: Hugh McCluggage
2023: Lincoln McCarthy
2024: Hugh McCluggage
2025: Hugh McCluggage
2026: Ryan Lester

==== Most improved player ====
Awarded 1999–2008.

1999: Steven Lawrence
2000: Luke Power
2001: Jonathan Brown
2002: Des Headland
2003: Daniel Bradshaw
2004: Robert Copeland
2005: Jed Adcock
2006: Michael Rischitelli
2007: Daniel Merrett
2008: Joel Patfull

==== Tackling award ====
Awarded 1997–2008, as 'Bill Cavanagh Memorial Player of the Year' from 1997–1998, as 'Bill Cavanagh Memorial Attitude Barometer Award' from 1999–2004 (in the categories of 'Full Ground' and 'Inside Forward 50m' from 1999–2000, in the categories of 'Most Effective Tackles' and 'Most Attempted Tackles' in 2001, in the categories of 'Most Effective Tackles' and 'Most Tackles' from 2002–2003, and in the categories of 'Most Effective Tackles', 'Most Tackles' and 'Most Difficult Tackles' in 2004), as 'Best Tackler' in 2005, as 'Most Effective Player' in 2006, and as 'Most Effective Tackler' from 2007–2008

1997: Danny Dickfos
1998: Steven Lawrence
1999: Full Ground: Simon Black, Inside Forward 50m: Jarrod Molloy
2000: Full Ground: Darryl White, Inside Forward 50m: Luke Power
2001: Most Effective Tackles: Jason Akermanis, Most Attempted Tackles: Simon Black
2002: Most Effective Tackles: Craig McRae, Most Tackles: Simon Black
2003: Most Effective Tackles: Luke Power, Most Tackles: Simon Black
2004: Most Effective Tackles: Nigel Lappin, Most Tackles: Nigel Lappin, Most Difficult Tackles: Robert Copeland
2005: Jason Akermanis
2006: Ben Fixter
2007: Jed Adcock
2008: Michael Rischitelli

==== Best Finals Player ====
Awarded 1999–present in seasons in which Brisbane played finals, ie 1999–2004, 2009 and 2019–present.

1999: Jason Akermanis
2000: Justin Leppitsch
2001: Nigel Lappin
2002: Michael Voss
2003: Luke Power
2004: Mal Michael
2009: Luke Power
2019: Stefan Martin
2020: Hugh McCluggage/Lachie Neale
2021: Charlie Cameron
2022: Lachie Neale
2023: Keidean Coleman/Hugh McCluggage
2024: Callum Ah Chee/Will Ashcroft/Lachie Neale/Brandon Starcevich
2025: Harris Andrews
2026: Will Ashcroft/Josh Dunkley

==== Best Midfielder ====
Awarded 2006–2008.

2006: Simon Black
2007: Simon Black
2008: Simon Black

==== Best Defender ====
Awarded 2006–2008.

2006: Mal Michael
2007: Daniel Merrett
2008: Joel Patfull

==== Best Forward ====
Awarded 2006–2008.

2006: Daniel Bradshaw
2007: Jonathan Brown
2008: Jonathan Brown

==== Most Competitive Player ====
Awarded 2006–present, as 'Most Courageous Player' from 2006–2008, as 'Shaun Hart Most Courageous Player' from 2009–2013, as 'Shaun Hart Most Competitive Player' from 2014–2016, and as 'Shaun Hart Trademark Player of the Year' from 2017–present.

2006: Michael Voss
2007: Jonathan Brown
2008: Michael Rischitelli
2009: Mitch Clark
2010: Jonathan Brown
2011: Jack Redden
2012: Joel Patfull
2013: Joel Patfull
2014: Tom Rockliff
2015: Mitch Robinson
2016: Darcy Gardiner
2017: Nick Robertson
2018: Darcy Gardiner
2019: Mitch Robinson
2020: Oscar McInerney
2021: Lincoln McCarthy
2022: Brandon Starcevich
2023: Josh Dunkley
2024: Oscar McInerney
2025: Josh Dunkley
2026: Jarrod Berry/Cam Rayner

==== Members' Player of the Year ====
Fan-voted awards presented from 2006–2018 and from 2022–present, as 'Members' Player of the Year' from 2006–2015, as 'Hyundai Club Player of the Year' from 2016–2018, as 'Game Changer' from 2022–2025 and as 'Fan MVP' from 2026–present.

2006: Simon Black
2007: Simon Black
2008: Luke Power
2010: Jonathan Brown
2011: Simon Black
2012: Jack Redden
2013: Pearce Hanley
2014: Tom Rockliff
2015: Stefan Martin
2016: Dayne Zorko
2017: Dayne Zorko
2018: Dayne Beams
2022: Lachie Neale
2023: Keidean Coleman
2024: Cameron Rayner
2025: Zac Bailey
2026: Will Ashcroft

==== Players' Player of the Year ====
Awarded 2009–present.

2009: Simon Black
2010: Simon Black
2011: Simon Black
2012: Jack Redden
2013: Joel Patfull
2014: Tom Rockliff
2015: Mitch Robinson
2016: Tom Rockliff
2017: Tom Rockliff
2018: Dayne Beams
2019: Lachie Neale/Mitch Robinson/Dayne Zorko
2020: Oscar McInerney
2021: Dayne Zorko
2022: Oscar McInerney
2023: Josh Dunkley
2024: Josh Dunkley
2025: Josh Dunkley
2026: Josh Dunkley/Logan Morris

==== The Courier-Mail Player of the Year ====
Awarded 2007–2010.

2007: Jonathan Brown
2008: Simon Black
2009: Simon Black
2010: Simon Black

==== Lions Club Player of the Year ====
Awarded 1998.

1998: Derek Wirth

==== Reserves Player of the Year ====
Awarded 2014–2019 and 2021–present, as 'Reserves Player of the Year' in 2014 and as 'Neville Fallon Brisbane Lions Reserves Best & Fairest' from 2015–2019 and 2021–present.

2014: Nick Hayes
2015: Zac O'Brien
2016: Billy Evans
2017: Oscar McInerney
2018: Ryan Bastinac/Claye Beams/Ben Keays/Corey Lyons
2019: Ryan Bastinac
2021: Connor Ballenden
2022: Ryan Lester/James Tunstill
2023: Jarryd Lyons
2024: Jarryd Lyons
2025: Luke Beecken/Deven Robertson
2026: Luke Beecken/Luke Lloyd

==== Leading club votegetter in Brownlow Medal ====
Bold text denotes player won Brownlow Medal

1997: Nigel Lappin (11 votes)
1998: Michael Voss (7)
1999: Jason Akermanis (13)
2000: Michael Voss (16)
2001: Jason Akermanis (23)
2002: Simon Black (25)
2003: Michael Voss (19)
2004: Simon Black (18)
2005: Luke Power (14)
2006: Jonathan Brown (13)
2007: Simon Black (22)
2008: Simon Black (23)
2009: Simon Black/Jonathan Brown (19)
2010: Jonathan Brown (12)
2011: Simon Black/Tom Rockliff (9)
2012: Daniel Rich/Tom Rockliff (8)
2013: Tom Rockliff (21)
2014: Tom Rockliff (15)
2015: Dayne Beams (9)
2016: Tom Rockliff (9)
2017: Dayne Beams (17)
2018: Dayne Beams (18)
2019: Lachie Neale (26)
2020: Lachie Neale (31)
2021: Jarryd Lyons (23)
2022: Lachie Neale (28)
2023: Lachie Neale (31)
2024: Lachie Neale (22)
2025: Hugh McCluggage (21)
2026: Will Ashcroft (27)

==== Hall of Fame ====
===== Legends =====
Name	Year inducted as inductee	Year inducted as legend	Reference	Hall of Fame profile
Haydn Bunton Sr.	N/A	2012		Profile
Kevin Murray	N/A	2012		Profile
Michael Voss	2012	2014		Profile
Garry Wilson	2012	2016		Profile
Simon Black	N/A	2023		Profile
Jonathan Brown	2019	2023		Profile
Robert Walls	2019	2026		Profile

===== Inductees =====
Name	Year inducted	Reference	Hall of Fame profile
Marcus Ashcroft	2012		Profile
Fred Hughson	2012		Profile
Nigel Lappin	2012		Profile
Justin Leppitsch	2012		Profile
Alastair Lynch	2012		Profile
Leigh Matthews	2012		Profile
Jack Moriarty	2012		Profile
John Murphy	2012		Profile
Percy Parratt	2012		Profile
Bernie Quinlan	2012		Profile
Paul Roos	2012		Profile
Allan Ruthven	2012		Profile
Bill Stephen	2012		Profile
Norm Brown	2014		Profile
Shaun Hart	2014		Profile
George Holden	2014		Profile
Chris Johnson	2014		Profile
Harold McLennan	2014		Profile
Roger Merrett	2014		Profile
Chris Scott	2014		Profile
Bill Walker	2014		Profile
Darryl White	2014		Profile
Len Wigraft	2014		Profile
Jason Akermanis	2016		Profile
George Coates	2016		Profile
Jimmy Freake	2016		Profile
Norm Johnstone	2016		Profile
Gary Pert	2016		Profile
Luke Power	2016		Profile
Matt Rendell	2016		Profile
Arthur Wilson	2016		Profile
Frank Curcio	2019		Profile
Alan Gale	2019		Profile
Andrew Ireland	2019		Profile
Warwick Irwin	2019		Profile
Richard Osborne	2019		Profile
Daniel Bradshaw	2023		Profile
Mick Grace	2023		Profile
Clark Keating	2023		Profile
Michael McLean	2023		Profile
Craig McRae	2023		Profile
Harvey Merrigan	2023		Profile
Mal Michael	2023		Profile
Martin Pike	2023		Profile
Wilfred "Chicken" Smallhorn	2023		Profile
Owen Abrahams	2026		Profile
Scott Clayton	2026		Profile
Michael Conlan	2026		Profile
Scott McIvor	2026		Profile
Tim Notting	2026		Profile
Brad Scott	2026		Profile
Len Smith	2026		Profile
Percy Trotter	2026		Profile

==== Kings of the Pride ====
Name	Era	Reference
Percy Parratt	1897–1926 (Fitzroy)	
Percy Trotter	1897–1926 (Fitzroy)	
Haydn Bunton, Sr	1927–1956 (Fitzroy)	
Allan Ruthven	1927–1956 (Fitzroy)	
Kevin Murray	1957–1966 (Fitzroy)	
John Murphy	1967–1976 (Fitzroy)	
Garry Wilson	1977–1986 (Fitzroy)	
Roger Merrett	1987–1996 (Brisbane Bears)	
Paul Roos	1987–1996 (Fitzroy)	
Michael Voss	1997–2006 (Brisbane Lions)	
Simon Black	2007–2016 (Brisbane Lions)	

=== Club records ===
Updated to end of 2026.

==== Most club matches ====
Player	Career years	Games
Simon Black	1997–2013	322
**Dayne Zorko**	2012–	321
Luke Power	1998–2011	282
Daniel Rich	2009–2023	275
**Harris Andrews**	2015–	263
Jonathan Brown	2000–2014	256
**Ryan Lester**	2011–	256
**Hugh McCluggage**	2017–	226
Daniel Bradshaw	1997–2009	219
Nigel Lappin	1997–2008	218
Ashley McGrath	2001–2014	214
**Eric Hipwood**	2016–	213
Jason Akermanis	1997–2006	210
Michael Voss	1997–2006	210
**Charlie Cameron**	2018–	208
Tim Notting	1998–2009	208
Jed Adcock	2004–2015	206
**Jarrod Berry**	2017–	206
Chris Johnson	1997–2007	205
Daniel Merrett	2005–2016	200

==== Most club goals ====
Player	Career years	Goals
Jonathan Brown	2000–2014	594
Daniel Bradshaw	1997–2009	496
**Charlie Cameron**	2018–	410
Alastair Lynch	1988–2004	371
**Eric Hipwood**	2016–	307
Jason Akermanis	1997–2006	263
**Dayne Zorko**	2012–	241
Luke Power	1998–2011	226
**Zac Bailey**	2018–	220
Joe Daniher	2021–2024	204

== AFL Women's awards and records ==
=== External awards ===
==== AFL Women's best and fairest ====
Emily Bates (2022 (S6))
Ally Anderson (2022 (S7))

==== AFL Women's Grand Final best on ground ====
Kate Lutkins (2021)
Shannon Campbell (2022 (S7))
Breanna Koenen (2023)

==== AFL Women's leading goalkicker ====
Jesse Tawhiao-Wardlaw (2022 (S7))
Taylor Smith (2024)

==== All-Australian team ====
Emily Bates (2017, 2018, 2022 (S6))
Sabrina Frederick-Traub (2017, 2018)
Tayla Harris (2017)
Kate McCarthy (2017)
Sam Virgo (2017)
Kate Lutkins (2018, 2020, 2021)
Jess Wuetschner (2018)
Ally Anderson (2019, 2023, 2024)
Nat Grider (2022 (S6), 2022 (S7))
Orla O'Dwyer (2022 (S6))
Greta Bodey (2022 (S7)))
Breanna Koenen (2022 (S7) — vice-captain)
Jesse Wardlaw (2022 (S7)))
Sophie Conway (2023, 2024)
Dakota Davidson (2023)
Belle Dawes (2024)
Taylor Smith (2024)
Jennifer Dunne (2025)
Courtney Hodder (2025)

===== Members of extended squads but not final teams =====
Kaitlyn Ashmore (2017)
Leah Kaslar (2017, 2018)
Jess Wuetschner (2017, 2019)
Emma Zielke (2017)
Ally Anderson (2018, 2022 (S7))
Nat Exon (2019)
Kate Lutkins (2019)
Emily Bates (2020)
Sophie Conway (2020, 2021)
Jesse Wardlaw (2020)
Dakota Davidson (2021)
Cathy Svarc (2021)
Greta Bodey (2022 (S6))
Tahlia Hickie (2022 (S7))
Nat Grider (2023)
Breanna Koenen (2024)
Belle Dawes (2025)
Jade Ellenger (2025)

==== AFLW Rising Star ====
===== Nominations =====
Year	Round	Player
2017	2	Tayla Harris
2017	4	Sabrina Frederick-Traub
2018	3	Sophie Conway
2018	6	Tahlia Randall
2019	6	Jacqui Yorston
2020	2	Jesse Wardlaw
2021
2021	1	Belle Dawes
2021	3	Nat Grider
2021	8	Courtney Hodder
2021	9	Tahlia Hickie
2022 (S6)	3	Zimmorlei Farquharson
2023	9	Charlotte Mullins

- No Brisbane players were nominated in 2022 (S7), 2024, 2025 or 2026.

==== Mark of the Year ====
Courtney Hodder (2023)

==== Goal of the Year ====
Courtney Hodder (2021)

==== AFL Players Association awards ====
===== Most Valuable Player =====
Emily Bates (2022 (S6))

===== Most Courageous Player =====
Courtney Hodder (2023)

===== Education and Training Excellence Award =====
Jade Ellenger (2024)

===== 22 Under 22 team =====
Ally Anderson (2017–2019)
Emily Bates (2017–2019)
Shannon Campbell (2017–2019)
Sophie Conway (2017–2019, 2020)
Sabrina Frederick-Traub (2017–2019)
Tayla Harris (2017–2019) (Note: A retrospective side was named in 2020 to cover the first three seasons of the AFLW, from 2017 to 2019. Of those seasons, Harris played for Brisbane in 2017 and Carlton in 2018 and 2019.)
Jesse Wardlaw (2020, 2022 (S6), 2022 (S7))
Dakota Davidson (2021)
Nat Grider (2021, 2022 (S6), 2022 (S7))
Courtney Hodder (2021, 2022 (S7))
Tahlia Hickie (2022 (S6), 2022 (S7))
Belle Dawes (2023)
Charlotte Mullins (2024)

====== Members of extended squads but not final teams ======
Belle Dawes (2021, 2022 (S7))
Jade Ellenger (2022 (S6))
Courtney Hodder (2022 (S6))
Charlotte Mullins (2025)

==== AFL Coaches Association awards ====
===== AFLW champion player of the year =====
Emily Bates (2022 (S6))

===== AFLW senior coach of the year =====
Craig Starcevich (2021, 2022 (S7), 2023)

=== Club awards ===
==== Best and fairest ====
Awarded 2017–present.

2017: Emily Bates
2018: Kate Lutkins
2019: Ally Anderson
2020: Emily Bates
2021: Ally Anderson
2022 (S6): Emily Bates
2022 (S7): Emily Bates
2023: Ally Anderson
2024: Ally Anderson
2025: Belle Dawes
2026: Orla O'Dwyer

==== Runner-up best and fairest ====
Awarded 2017–present.

2017: Sabrina Frederick-Traub
2018: Jamie Stanton
2019: Nat Exon
2020: Kate Lutkins
2021: Orla O'Dwyer
2022 (S6): Greta Bodey
2022 (S7): Ally Anderson
2023: Belle Dawes
2024: Belle Dawes
2025: Ally Anderson
2026: Belle Dawes

==== Leading club goalkicker ====
Awarded 2017–present. Bold text denotes player won AFL Women's leading goalkicker by kicking the most goals in the league in the home and away season. Italic text denotes player was the AFL Women's leading goalkicker after finals.

2017: Kate McCarthy (9 goals)
2018: Jess Wuetschner (13 goals)
2019: Jess Wuetschner (8 goals)
2020: Jesse Wardlaw (9 goals)
2021: Dakota Davidson (16 goals)
2022 (S6): Greta Bodey (13 goals)
2022 (S7): Jesse Wardlaw (22 goals)
2023: Dakota Davidson (23 goals)
2024: Taylor Smith (22 goals)
2025: Taylor Smith (18 goals)
2026: Dakota Davidson (11 goals)

==== Trademark Player of the Year ====
Awarded 2017–present, as 'Player's Player of the Year' from 2017–2020 and as 'Trademark Player of the Year' from 2021–present.

2017: Emily Bates
2018: Kate Lutkins
2019: Nat Exon
2020: Kate Lutkins
2021: Breanna Koenen
2022 (S6): Cathy Svarc
2022 (S7): Breanna Koenen
2023: Belle Dawes
2024: Belle Dawes
2025: Courtney Hodder
2026: Belle Dawes

==== Rising Star ====
Awarded 2019–present, as 'Best First Year Player' (with the requirement that winners must be in their first year) from 2019–2022 (S6) and as 'Rising Star' from 2022 (S7)–present (with the requirement that winners must have played fewer than 25 AFLW games, regardless of how long they had been at the club).

2019: Jesse Wardlaw
2020: Cathy Svarc
2021: Courtney Hodder
2022 (S6): Lulu Pullar
2022 (S7): Ruby Svarc
2023: Charlotte Mullins
2024: Jennifer Dunne
2025: Neasa Dooley
2026: Asher Fearn-Wannan

==== Most Competitive ====
Awarded 2017–present, as 'Most Competitive' from 2017–2022 (S7) and as 'Lionhearted Award' from 2023–present.

2017: Leah Kaslar
2018: Nat Exon
2019: Kate Lutkins
2020: Nat Grider
2021: Dakota Davidson
2022 (S6): Belle Dawes
2022 (S7): Courtney Hodder
2023: Lily Postlethwaite
2024: Ruby Svarc
2025: Courtney Hodder
2026: Tahlia Hickie

==== Most Relentless ====
Awarded 2017–present, as 'Most Courageous' in 2017 and as 'Most Relentless' from 2018–present.

2017: Kate Lutkins
2018: Ally Anderson
2019: Shannon Campbell
2020: Sophie Conway
2021: Cathy Svarc
2022 (S6): Taylor Smith
2022 (S7): Kate Lutkins
2023: Courtney Hodder
2024: Cathy Svarc
2025: Tahlia Hickie
2026: Nat Grider

==== All For One Award ====
Awarded 2017–present.

2017: Sam Virgo
2018: Leah Kaslar
2019: Sharni Webb
2020: Sharni Webb
2021: Shannon Campbell
2022 (S6): Nat Grider
2022 (S7): Jade Ellenger
2023: Nat Grider
2024: Lily Postlethwaite
2025: Shannon Campbell
2026: Breanna Koenen

==== Members' MVP ====
Fan-voted awards presented from 2017–2018 and from 2022 (S7)–present, as 'Members' MVP' from 2017–2018, as 'MVP for Best Lion Afield' in 2022 (S7), as 'Game Changer' from 2023–2025 and as 'Fan Award' from 2026–present.

2017: Kate McCarthy
2018: Kate Lutkins
2022 (S7): Cathy Svarc
2023: Belle Dawes
2024: Belle Dawes
2025: Ally Anderson
2026: Orla O'Dwyer

==== Best Finals Player ====
Awarded 2021–present in seasons in which Brisbane played finals, ie 2021–2025.

2021: Ally Anderson/Breanna Koenen
2022 (S6): Emily Bates
2022 (S7): Emily Bates
2023: Belle Dawes
2024: Orla O'Dwyer
2025: Belle Dawes

==== Leading club votegetter in AFL Women's best and fairest ====
Bold text denotes player won AFL Women's best and fairest.

2017: Kaitlyn Ashmore (8 votes)
2018: Sabrina Frederick-Traub (6)
2019: Emma Zielke (4)
2020: Kate Lutkins (5)
2021: Ally Anderson (9)
2022 (S6): Emily Bates (21)
2022 (S7): Ally Anderson (21)
2023: Ally Anderson (14)
2024: Sophie Conway (14)
2025: Belle Dawes (10)

=== Club records ===
Updated to end of 2026.

==== Most club games ====
Player	Career years	Games
**Ally Anderson**	2017–	116
**Shannon Campbell**	2017–	115
**Breanna Koenen**	2017–	115
**Sophie Conway**	2018–	101

==== Most club goals ====
Player	Career years	Goals
**Dakota Davidson**	2020–	94
Taylor Smith	2021–2025	67
**Sophie Conway**	2018–	62
**Courtney Hodder**	2021–	52
