= 2002 Brisbane Lions season =

Brisbane Lions
2002 season
- Coach: Leigh Matthews
- Captain: Michael Voss
- Home ground: The Gabba (Capacity: 37,600)
- AFL season: 2nd
- Finals series: Premiers
- Best and fairest: Simon Black
- Leading goalkicker: Alastair Lynch (74 goals)
- Highest home attendance: 35,898 vs. Essendon (13 April 2002)
- Lowest home attendance: 21,709 vs. Fremantle (26 May 2002)
- Average home attendance: 26,894
- Club membership: 22,288

The Brisbane Lions' 2002 season was its sixth season in the Australian Football League (AFL). In it, the club won its second consecutive premiership, and second overall.

== Season summary ==
=== Premiership Season ===
==== Home and away season ====
Rd	Date and local time	Opponent	Scores		Venue	Attendance
Rd	Date and local time	Opponent	Brisbane	Opponent	Venue	Attendance
1	31 March (1:10 pm)	Sydney	110	87	SCG (A)	24,052
2	7 April (1:10 pm)	Hawthorn	148	46	The Gabba (H)	25,660
3	13 April (7:10 pm)	Essendon	117	67	The Gabba (H)	35,898
4	20 April (7:10 pm)	Western Bulldogs	94	78	Docklands Stadium (A)	23,928
5	27 April (1:40 pm)	West Coast	75	121	Subiaco Oval (A)	33,313
6	4 May (7:10 pm)	Geelong	146	89	The Gabba (H)	27,015
7	12 May (1:10 pm)	Port Adelaide	129	72	The Gabba (H)	24,538
8	18 May (7:10 pm)	Collingwood	111	114	Docklands Stadium (A)	46,279
9	26 May (1:10 pm)	Fremantle	109	79	The Gabba (H)	21,709
10	1 June (7:10 pm)	Adelaide	94	101	Football Park (A)	47,279
11	9 June (1:10 pm)	St Kilda	113	52	The Gabba (H)	23,157
12	22 June (7:10 pm)	Kangaroos	138	123	The Gabba (H)	27,940
13	29 June (7:10 pm)	Carlton	124	109	The Gabba (H)	27,324
14	7 July (1:10 pm)	Melbourne	110	131	The Gabba (A)	25,166
15	13 July (7:10 pm)	Richmond	118	55	Docklands Stadium (A)	22,642
16	21 July (1:10 pm)	Sydney	117	79	The Gabba (H)	25,720
17	27 July (2:10 pm)	Hawthorn	124	68	MCG (A)	35,202
18	3 August (7:10 pm)	Essendon	108	71	Docklands Stadium (A)	43,036
19	10 August (7:10 pm)	Western Bulldogs	105	67	The Gabba (H)	27,443
20	17 August (7:10 pm)	West Coast	136	89	The Gabba (H)	29,436
21	24 August (2:10 pm)	Geelong	110	55	Kardinia Park (A)	24,003
22	31 August (2:10 pm)	Port Adelaide	84	90	Football Park (A)	46,439

==== Finals series ====
Rd	Date and local time	Opponent	Scores		Venue	Attendance
Rd	Date and local time	Opponent	Brisbane	Opponent	Venue	Attendance
Second qualifying final	7 September (7:30 pm)	Adelaide	115	44	The Gabba	31,854
Second preliminary final	21 September (7:30 pm)	Port Adelaide	138	82	The Gabba	33,047
Grand Final	28 September (2:30 pm)	Collingwood	75	66	MCG	91,817

== Ladder ==
2002 AFL ladder
Pos	Team	Pld	W	L	D	PF	PA	PP	Pts	
1	Port Adelaide	22	18	4	0	2360	1783	132.4	72	Finals series
2	Brisbane Lions (P)	22	17	5	0	2520	1843	136.7	68	Finals series
3	Adelaide	22	15	7	0	2308	2007	115.0	60	Finals series
4	Collingwood	22	13	9	0	2081	1897	109.7	52	Finals series
5	Essendon	22	12	9	1	1939	1847	105.0	50	Finals series
6	Melbourne	22	12	10	0	2243	2245	99.9	48	Finals series
7	Kangaroos	22	12	10	0	2241	2269	98.8	48	Finals series
8	West Coast	22	11	11	0	2208	2254	98.0	44	Finals series
9	Geelong	22	11	11	0	1933	2029	95.3	44	
10	Hawthorn	22	11	11	0	1938	2107	92.0	44	
11	Sydney	22	9	12	1	2123	1976	107.4	38	
12	Western Bulldogs	22	9	12	1	2335	2246	104.0	38	
13	Fremantle	22	9	13	0	1900	2151	88.3	36	
14	Richmond	22	7	15	0	1801	2172	82.9	28	
15	St Kilda	22	5	16	1	1785	2271	78.6	22	
16	Carlton	22	3	19	0	1682	2300	73.1	12	

Source: AFL ladder
Rules for classification: 1) points; 2) percentage; 3) number of points for.
(P) Premiers

== Playing squad ==
Player	Games in 2002	Goals in 2002	Career games	Career goals
Jason Akermanis	24	31	272	338
Marcus Ashcroft	25	5	343	150
Simon Black	24	10	346	182
Craig Bolton	4	0	249	34
Daniel Bradshaw	12	23	234	519
Jonathan Brown	23	37	279	594
Jamie Charman	5	1	134	77
Nathan Clarke	3	0	9	5
Robert Copeland	25	5	168	30
Richard Hadley	3	0	69	17
Shaun Hart	25	7	298	118
Des Headland	23	32	166	123
Chris Johnson	23	4	287	124
Clark Keating	14	8	153	80
Matthew Kennedy	12	0	200	34
Nigel Lappin	25	13	304	187
Justin Leppitsch	24	8	251	202
Alastair Lynch	22	74	328	633
Beau McDonald	9	1	100	38
Ashley McGrath	17	12	214	143
Dylan McLaren	5	0	98	11
Craig McRae	24	20	219	232
Mal Michael	25	0	262	49
Tim Notting	22	16	229	138
Martin Pike	25	11	262	125
Luke Power	25	25	307	226
Brad Scott	20	5	188	45
Chris Scott	16	4	231	30
Aaron Shattock	10	4	76	25
Michael Voss (c)	21	21	310	245
Darryl White	23	15	291	165
Blake Caracella	25	25	187	218

- Statistics are for AFL premiership matches only (source: AFL Tables).

== 2002 AFL Grand Final team ==
B	HB	C
Chris Johnson	Mal Michael	Darryl White
Shaun Hart	Justin Leppitsch	Nigel Lappin
HF	F	R
Des Headland	Alastair Lynch	Craig McRae
Martin Pike	Jonathan Brown	Luke Power
Followers	Interchange	Coach
Clark Keating	Michael Voss (c)	Blake Caracella
Simon Black	Tim Notting	Aaron Shattock
	Robert Copeland	Leigh Matthews

- Coach: Leigh Matthews
