= 2001 Brisbane Lions season =

Brisbane Lions
2001 season
- Coach: Leigh Matthews
- Captain: Michael Voss
- Home ground: The Gabba (Capacity: 42,000)
- AFL season: 2nd
- Finals series: Premiers
- Best and fairest: Simon Black; Michael Voss
- Leading goalkicker: Alastair Lynch (58 goals)
- Highest home attendance: 36,149 vs. Essendon (2 June 2001)
- Lowest home attendance: 20,059 vs. Fremantle (29 April 2001)
- Average home attendance: 27,637
- Club membership: 18,330

The Brisbane Lions' 2001 season was its fifth season in the Australian Football League (AFL). In it, the club won the first premiership in its history.

== Season summary ==
=== Home and away season ===
Rd	Date and local time	Opponent	Scores		Venue	Attendance
Rd	Date and local time	Opponent	Brisbane	Opponent	Venue	Attendance
1	31 March (7:10 pm)	Port Adelaide	93	99	Football Park (A)	25,948
2	8 April (2:10 pm)	Kangaroos	118	58	The Gabba (H)	22,970
3	14 April (2:10 pm)	Richmond	94	116	MCG (A)	31,688
4	21 April (2:10 pm)	Western Bulldogs	87	140	Docklands Stadium (A)	20,322
5	29 April (2:10 pm)	Fremantle	171	122	The Gabba (H)	20,059
6	5 May (7:40 pm)	Geelong	116	61	The Gabba (H)	25,881
7	13 May (2:10 pm)	Sydney	112	80	SCG (A)	22,390
8	19 May (2:10 pm)	Carlton	68	142	Princes Park (A)	21,997
9	26 May (7:40 pm)	Adelaide	122	127	The Gabba (H)	24,122
10	2 June (7:40 pm)	Essendon	102	74	The Gabba (H)	36,149
11	9 June (5:40 pm)	West Coast	84	62	Subiaco Oval (A)	25,588
12	17 June (2:10 pm)	Melbourne	148	99	The Gabba (A)	23,740
13	29 June (7:40 pm)	Hawthorn	140	53	The Gabba (H)	30,573
14	7 July (7:40 pm)	St Kilda	119	62	The Gabba (H)	22,911
15	15 July (2:10 pm)	Collingwood	129	103	MCG (A)	45,016
16	21 July (7:40 pm)	Port Adelaide	94	60	The Gabba (H)	29,547
17	28 July (7:00 pm)	Kangaroos	136	115	Docklands Stadium (A)	26,776
18	5 August (2:10 pm)	Western Bulldogs	136	103	The Gabba (H)	26,872
19	12 August (2:10 pm)	Richmond	128	97	The Gabba (H)	31,324
20	19 August (2:10 pm)	Fremantle	138	87	Subiaco Oval (A)	15,136
21	26 August (2:10 pm)	Geelong	110	67	Kardinia Park (A)	24,325
22	1 September (7:40 pm)	Sydney	93	62	The Gabba (H)	33,606

=== Finals series ===
Rd	Date and local time	Opponent	Scores		Venue	Attendance
Rd	Date and local time	Opponent	Brisbane	Opponent	Venue	Attendance
Second qualifying final	8 September (7:45 pm)	Port Adelaide	88	56	The Gabba	32,380
Second preliminary final	22 September (7:45 pm)	Richmond	136	68	The Gabba	37,032
Grand Final	29 September (2:30 pm)	Essendon	108	82	MCG	91,482

== Ladder ==
2001 AFL ladder
Pos	Team	Pld	W	L	D	PF	PA	PP	Pts	
1	Essendon	22	17	5	0	2548	1895	134.5	68	Finals series
2	Brisbane Lions (P)	22	17	5	0	2538	1989	127.6	68	Finals series
3	Port Adelaide	22	16	6	0	2473	1918	128.9	64	Finals series
4	Richmond	22	15	7	0	2126	1973	107.8	60	Finals series
5	Carlton	22	14	8	0	2311	1797	128.6	56	Finals series
6	Hawthorn	22	13	9	0	2149	2041	105.3	52	Finals series
7	Sydney	22	12	10	0	2121	1833	115.7	48	Finals series
8	Adelaide	22	12	10	0	2085	2026	102.9	48	Finals series
9	Collingwood	22	11	11	0	2232	2088	106.9	44	
10	Western Bulldogs	22	10	12	0	2305	2458	93.8	40	
11	Melbourne	22	10	12	0	2136	2364	90.4	40	
12	Geelong	22	9	13	0	1926	2054	93.8	36	
13	Kangaroos	22	9	13	0	2161	2371	91.1	36	
14	West Coast	22	5	17	0	1708	2590	65.9	20	
15	St Kilda	22	4	18	0	1917	2642	72.6	16	
16	Fremantle	22	2	20	0	1794	2491	72.0	8	

Source: AFL ladder
Rules for classification: 1) points; 2) percentage; 3) number of points for.
(P) Premiers

== Playing squad ==
The following players were listed with Brisbane during the 2001 AFL season:

Player	Games in 2001	Goals in 2001	Career games	Career goals
Jason Akermanis	24	28	248	307
Marcus Ashcroft	25	6	318	145
Simon Black	25	16	322	172
Craig Bolton	1	0	246	34
Daniel Bradshaw	16	24	222	496
Jonathan Brown	20	37	256	594
Jamie Charman	1	0	129	77
Nathan Clarke	6	5	6	5
Robert Copeland	14	2	143	30
Damian Cupido	3	2	40	58
Richard Hadley	0	0	66	17
Shaun Hart	22	10	273	111
Des Headland	14	6	166	123
Chris Johnson	23	11	264	124
Clark Keating	6	4	139	72
Matthew Kennedy	12	1	188	34
Trent Knobel	7	0	75	13
Nigel Lappin	22	11	279	174
Justin Leppitsch	22	9	227	194
Alastair Lynch	23	58	306	633
Beau McDonald	15	2	91	38
Ashley McGrath	7	2	214	143
Dylan McLaren	6	0	93	11
Craig McRae	23	24	195	232
Mal Michael	25	5	237	49
Tim Notting	24	26	207	138
Marcus Picken	4	1	29	20
Martin Pike	23	9	237	125
Luke Power	24	31	282	226
Ben Robbins	13	3	92	25
Brad Scott	18	7	168	45
Chris Scott	20	7	215	30
Aaron Shattock	7	2	66	25
Michael Voss (c)	23	22	289	245
Darryl White	21	7	268	165

- Statistics are for AFL premiership matches only.

== 2001 AFL Grand Final team ==
The Brisbane Lions fielded the following side in the 2001 AFL Grand Final against Essendon on 29 September 2001 at the Melbourne Cricket Ground:

B	HB	C
Chris Johnson	Mal Michael	Darryl White
Shaun Hart	Justin Leppitsch	Nigel Lappin
HF	F	R
Jason Akermanis	Alastair Lynch	Craig McRae
Martin Pike	Jonathan Brown	Luke Power
Followers	Interchange	Coach
Clark Keating	Michael Voss (c)	Matthew Kennedy
Simon Black	Tim Notting	Robert Copeland
	Craig Bolton	Leigh Matthews

- Coach: Leigh Matthews
