= 2015 Brisbane Lions season =

Brisbane Lions
2015 season
- President: Bob Sharpless
- Coach: Justin Leppitsch
- Captain: Tom Rockliff
- Home ground: The Gabba (Capacity: 42,000)
- Best and Fairest: Dayne Beams; Stefan Martin; Mitch Robinson; Dayne Zorko
- Leading goalkicker: Josh Green (25 goals)
- Average home attendance: 20,634
- Club membership: 25,102

The Brisbane Lions' 2015 season was the 19th season in the Australian Football League (AFL).

== Playing list changes ==
The following summarises all player changes between the conclusion of the 2014 season and the commencement of the 2015 season.

=== In ===
Player	Previous club	League	via
Dayne Beams	Collingwood	Australian Football League	AFL Trade Period
Allen Christensen	Geelong	Australian Football League	AFL Trade Period
Mitch Robinson	Carlton	Australian Football League	Delisted free agent

=== Out ===
Player	New Club	League	via
Jonathan Brown	N/A	N/A	Retirement
Brent Moloney	N/A	N/A	Retirement
Ashley McGrath	N/A	N/A	Retirement
Andrew Raines	Gold Coast	AFL	Delisted from Brisbane; drafted by Gold Coast in the rookie draft
James Polkinghorne	Essendon reserves	VFL	Delisted
Jordan Lisle	Port Melbourne	VFL	Delisted
Patrick Wearden	Port Melbourne	VFL	Delisted
Nick Hayes	Woodville-West Torrens	SANFL	Delisted
Sam Michael	Redland	NEAFL	Delisted
Isaac Conway	Werribee	VFL	Delisted
Joel Patfull	Greater Western Sydney	AFL	AFL Trade Period
Jack Crisp	Collingwood	AFL	AFL Trade Period

== Season summary ==
=== Pre-season matches ===
**Rd**	**Date and local time**	**Opponent**	**Scores** (Brisbane's scores indicated in **bold**)			**Venue**	**Attendance**
**Rd**	**Date and local time**	**Opponent**	Home	Away	Result	**Venue**	**Attendance**
1	Saturday, 28 February (3:10 pm)	St Kilda	**0.7.16 (58)**	0.8.7 (55)	Won by three points	Moreton Bay Central Sports Complex, Burpengary (H)	6,200
2	Friday, 6 March (7:10 pm)	Sydney	1.4.6 (39)	**0.10.15 (75)**	Won by 36 points	Coffs Harbour International Stadium (A)	
3	Friday, 20 March (7:40 pm)	Gold Coast	0.8.15 (63)	**1.7.12 (63)**	Match drawn	Metricon Stadium (A)	

=== Premiership Season ===
==== Home and away season ====
**Rd**	**Date and local time**	**Opponent**	**Scores** (Brisbane's scores indicated in **bold**)			**Venue**	**Attendance**	**Ladder** **position**
**Rd**	**Date and local time**	**Opponent**	Home	Away	Result	**Venue**	**Attendance**	**Ladder** **position**
1	Saturday, 4 April (6:20 pm)	Collingwood	**11.8 (74)**	12.14 (86)	Lost by 12 points	The Gabba (H)	31,240	13th
2	Sunday, 12 April (4:40 pm)	North Melbourne	20.13 (133)	**7.9 (51)**	Lost by 82 points	Etihad Stadium (A)	22,275	17th
3	Saturday, 18 April (7:20 pm)	Richmond	**8.10 (58)**	21.11 (137)	Lost by 79 points	The Gabba (H)	22,441	18th
4	Sunday, 26 April (1:10 pm)	West Coast	**9.11 (65)**	17.16 (118)	Lost by 53 points	The Gabba (H)	16,632	18th
5	Saturday, 2 May (4:35 pm)	Gold Coast	18.10 (118)	**7.12 (54)**	Lost by 64 points	Metricon Stadium (A)	12,464	18th
6	Sunday, 10 May (3:20 pm)	Carlton	11.9 (75)	**12.12 (84)**	Won by 9 points	Etihad Stadium (A)	20,273	18th
7	Sunday, 17 May (4:40 pm)	Port Adelaide	**15.12 (102)**	8.17 (65)	Won by 37 points	The Gabba (H)	15,957	
8	Sunday, 24 May (1:10 pm)	Essendon	21.10 (136)	**12.6 (78)**	Lost by 58 points	Etihad Stadium (A)	36,857	
9	Sunday, 31 May (1:10 pm)	St Kilda	**13.8 (86)**	16.12 (108)	Lost by 22 points	The Gabba (H)	16,898	
10	Sunday, 7 June (1:10 pm)	Greater Western Sydney	14.13 (97)	**10.7 (67)**	Lost by 30 points	Spotless Stadium (A)	9,079	
11	Bye							
12	Saturday, 20 June (7:20 pm)	Western Bulldogs	22.14 (146)	**11.8 (74)**	Lost by 72 points	Etihad Stadium (A)	21,129	
13	Saturday, 27 June (4:35 pm)	Adelaide	**10.9 (69)**	11.16 (82)	Lost by 13 points	The Gabba (H)	18,146	
14	Sunday, 5 July (2:40 pm)	Fremantle	13.6 (84)	**7.6 (48)**	Lost by 36 points	Patersons Stadium (A)	32,970	
15	Sunday, 12 July (4:40 pm)	Sydney	**7.7 (49)**	10.10 (70)	Lost by 21 points	The Gabba (H)	16,936	18th
16	Sunday, 19 July (1:10 pm)	Melbourne	8.12 (60)	**4.12 (36)**	Lost by 24 points	Melbourne Cricket Ground (A)	25,149	
17	Saturday, 25 July (7:20 pm)	North Melbourne	**5.8 (38)**	16.14 (110)	Lost by 72 points	The Gabba (H)	15,563	
18	Saturday, 1 August (1:45 pm)	Geelong	17.11 (113)	**8.9 (57)**	Lost by 56 points	Simonds Stadium (A)	21,914	
19	Saturday, 8 August (4:35 pm)	Gold Coast	**14.16 (100)**	17.12 (114)	Lost by 14 points	The Gabba (H)	20,025	
20	Saturday, 15 August (7:20 pm)	Carlton	**20.11 (131)**	9.13 (67)	Won by 64 points	The Gabba (H)	17,744	17th
21	Saturday, 22 August (7:10 pm)	Adelaide	20.11 (131)	**6.8 (44)**	Lost by 87 points	Adelaide Oval (A)	47,527	18th
22	Saturday, 29 August (2:10 pm)	Hawthorn	21.8 (134)	**9.8 (62)**	Lost by 72 points	Aurora Stadium (A)	11,731	18th
23	Saturday, 5 September (1:45 pm)	Western Bulldogs	**19.16 (130)**	19.8 (122)	Won by 8 points	The Gabba (H)	15,434	17th

== Ladder ==
Pos	Team	Pld	W	L	D	PF	PA	PP	Pts	Qualification
1	Fremantle	22	17	5	0	1857	1564	118.7	68	Finals series
2	West Coast	22	16	5	1	2330	1572	148.2	66	Finals series
3	Hawthorn (P)	22	16	6	0	2452	1548	158.4	64	Finals series
4	Sydney	22	16	6	0	2006	1578	127.1	64	Finals series
5	Richmond	22	15	7	0	1930	1568	123.1	60	Finals series
6	Western Bulldogs	22	14	8	0	2101	1825	115.1	56	Finals series
7	Adelaide	21	13	8	0	2107	1821	115.7	54 (Note: The round 14 match between Adelaide and Geelong was cancelled due to the death of Adelaide coach Phil Walsh, and both teams were awarded two premiership points each.)	Finals series
8	North Melbourne	22	13	9	0	2062	1937	106.5	52	Finals series
9	Port Adelaide	22	12	10	0	2002	1874	106.8	48	
10	Geelong	21	11	9	1	1853	1833	101.1	48	
11	Greater Western Sydney	22	11	11	0	1872	1891	99.0	44	
12	Collingwood	22	10	12	0	1972	1856	106.3	40	
13	Melbourne	22	7	15	0	1573	2044	77.0	28	
14	St Kilda	22	6	15	1	1695	2162	78.4	26	
15	Essendon	22	6	16	0	1580	2134	74.0	24	
16	Gold Coast	22	4	17	1	1633	2240	72.9	18	
17	Brisbane Lions	22	4	18	0	1557	2306	67.5	16	
18	Carlton	22	4	18	0	1525	2354	64.8	16	

Rules for classification: 1) points; 2) percentage; 3) number of points for.
(P) Premiers

== Brownlow Medal ==
=== Results ===
Round	1 vote	2 votes	3 votes
1			
2			
3			
4			
5			
6			
7			
8			
9			
10			
11			
12			
13			
14			
15			
16			
17			
18			
19			
20			
21			
22			
23			

=== Brownlow Medal tally ===
Player	1 vote games	2 vote games	3 vote games	Total votes
Total				

- italics denotes ineligible player

== Tribunal cases ==
Player	Round	Charge category	Verdict	Result	Victim	Club	Ref(s)
Darcy Gardiner	14	Wrestling	Guilty	$1,000 fine	Hayden Ballantyne	Fremantle	
Stefan Martin	13	Striking	Guilty	Two match ban	Luke Brown	Adelaide	
Darcy Gardiner	6	Engaging in rough conduct	Guilty	$1,000 fine	Marc Murphy	Carlton	
Tom Rockliff	6	Engaging in a melee	Guilty	$1,000 fine		Carlton	
Claye Beams	6	Engaging in a melee	Guilty	$1,000 fine		Carlton	
Darcy Gardiner	6	Engaging in a melee	Guilty	$1,000 fine		Carlton	
Nick Robertson	5	Striking	Guilty	$1,000 fine	Tom Nicholls	Gold Coast	
