= 1999 Brisbane Lions season =

Brisbane Lions
1999 season
- Coach: Leigh Matthews
- Captain: Alastair Lynch/Michael Voss
- Home ground: The Gabba (Capacity: 42,000)
- AFL season: 3rd
- Best and fairest: Jason Akermanis/Justin Leppitsch
- Leading goalkicker: Jarrod Molloy (44 goals)
- Highest home attendance: 24,989 vs. Essendon (19 June 1999)
- Lowest home attendance: 17,665 vs. Western Bulldogs (5 June 1999)
- Average home attendance: 21,890
- Club membership: 16,931

The Brisbane Lions' 1999 season was its third in the Australian Football League (AFL).

== Season summary ==
=== Premiership Season ===
==== Home and away season ====
Rd	Date and local time	Opponent	Scores		Venue	Attendance
Rd	Date and local time	Opponent	Brisbane	Opponent	Venue	Attendance
1	27 March (7:40 pm)	St Kilda	152	63	The Gabba (H)	20,172
2	3 April (9:00 pm)	West Coast	73	83	Subiaco Oval (A)	29,932
3	10 April (7:40 pm)	Port Adelaide	80	103	The Gabba (H)	21,092
4	17 April (7:40 pm)	Adelaide	115	54	The Gabba (H)	21,360
5	25 April (9:00 pm)	Fremantle	108	53	Subiaco Oval (A)	24,044
6	1 May (7:10 pm)	Melbourne	93	70	The Gabba (H)	21,753
7	8 May (7:40 pm)	Collingwood	96	62	The Gabba (H)	22,023
8	16 May (2:10 pm)	Richmond	119	135	Melbourne Cricket Ground (A)	28,217
9	23 May (2:40 pm)	Geelong	144	87	The Gabba (H)	22,948
10	5 June (7:40 pm)	Western Bulldogs	44	66	The Gabba (H)	17,665
11	12 June (2:10 pm)	Carlton	94	78	Princes Park (A)	24,235
12	19 June (7:40 pm)	Essendon	71	89	The Gabba (H)	24,989
13	27 June (2:40 pm)	Sydney	133	98	Sydney Cricket Ground (A)	25,528
14	3 July (2:10 pm)	Kangaroos	100	102	Melbourne Cricket Ground (A)	24,189
15	10 July (7:40 pm)	Hawthorn	92	61	The Gabba (H)	22,758
16	17 July (2:10 pm)	St Kilda	107	68	Waverley Park (A)	22,268
17	25 July (2:10 pm)	West Coast	166	66	The Gabba (H)	22,186
18	1 August (2:10 pm)	Port Adelaide	118	66	Football Park (A)	33,345
19	8 August (2:10 pm)	Adelaide	83	44	Football Park (A)	33,398
20	15 August (2:10 pm)	Fremantle	181	67	The Gabba (H)	23,845
21	21 August (2:10 pm)	Melbourne	159	104	Melbourne Cricket Ground (A)	18,679
22	28 August (2:10 pm)	Collingwood	94	52	Victoria Park (A)	24,493

==== Finals series ====
Rd	Date and local time	Opponent	Scores		Venue	Attendance
Rd	Date and local time	Opponent	Brisbane	Opponent	Venue	Attendance
Second qualifying final	4 September (7:45 pm)	Carlton	138	65	The Gabba	26,112
Second semi-final	11 September (7:45 pm)	Western Bulldogs	126	73	The Gabba	24,045
First preliminary final	17 September (7:45 pm)	Kangaroos	78	123	Melbourne Cricket Ground (A)	61,031

== Ladder ==
(P)	Premiers
	Qualified for finals

#	Team	P	W	L	D	PF	PA	%	Pts
1	Essendon	22	18	4	0	2400	1905	126.0	72
2	Kangaroos (P)	22	17	5	0	2463	2129	115.7	68
3	Brisbane Lions	22	16	6	0	2422	1671	144.9	64
4	Western Bulldogs	22	15	6	1	2363	1993	118.6	62
5	West Coast	22	12	10	0	2068	1937	106.8	48
6	Carlton	22	12	10	0	2088	2028	103.0	48
7	Port Adelaide	22	12	10	0	1851	2054	90.1	48
8	Sydney	22	11	11	0	2184	2128	102.6	44
9	Hawthorn	22	10	11	1	1858	1943	95.6	42
10	St Kilda	22	10	12	0	1978	2021	97.9	40
11	Geelong	22	10	12	0	2328	2454	94.9	40
12	Richmond	22	9	13	0	1977	2170	91.1	36
13	Adelaide	22	8	14	0	1903	2232	85.3	32
14	Melbourne	22	6	16	0	1850	2293	80.7	24
15	Fremantle	22	5	17	0	1981	2403	82.4	20
16	Collingwood	22	4	18	0	1973	2326	84.8	16

Rules for classification: 1. premiership points; 2. percentage; 3. points for
Average score: 95.7
Source: AFL Tables
