= Arthur Wilson (administrator) =

Australian administrator and historian (born 1944)

Arthur Wilson OAM
- Born: Arthur John Wilson; 1930 or 1931
- Died: 12 November 2021 (aged 90)
- Occupations: administrator, committee member, recruiting manager, secretary, football manager, historian
- Organisation: Fitzroy–Brisbane Lions Historical Society

Arthur John Wilson OAM (1930 or 1931 – 12 November 2021) was an Australian administrator and historian who was the chairman of the Fitzroy–Brisbane Lions Historical Society. He was involved with Fitzroy and its successor, the Brisbane Lions, for more than 40 years.

== Fitzroy involvement ==
Wilson was a mascot in the 1944 grand final, in which Fitzroy won their last VFL premiership. He unofficially joined the club in 1965, and officially joined the Fitzroy General Committee in 1968. He remained on the Committee until 1978, and was the Recruiting manager in 1979. His recruiting has been described as "important" to the club's success in the 1980s. From 1980 to 1985 he was the club's secretary, and he had his last official stint at the club from 1986 to 1990, as the Football Manager.

== Fitzroy–Brisbane Lions Historical Society ==
In 1997, after the merger between Fitzroy and the Brisbane Bears to create the Brisbane Lions, Wilson founded the Fitzroy–Brisbane Lions Historical Society with George Coates, creator of Fitzroy's logo. He was the president of the Society from 1997 to 2010, and was the chairman. He helped found a Fitzroy museum at Docklands Stadium.

Arthur Wilson died peacefully on 12 November 2021 at the age of 90.

== Honours ==
Wilson was one of eight inducted into the Brisbane Lions Hall of Fame in 2016. He was the first non–player or coach inducted. He was also a Brisbane Lions Life Member and a member of the Fitzroy–Brisbane Lions Past Players and Officials Association Hall of Fame.

In 2019, he was awarded the Medal of the Order of Australia (OAM).
