= Sam Michael (footballer) =

Australian rules footballer

Personal information
- Full name: Sam Michael
- Born: 5 July 1993 (age 33); Brisbane, Queensland, Australia
- Original teams: Redland, (NEAFL)
- Draft: No. 96, 2012 rookie draft
- Height: 199 cm (6 ft 6 in)
- Weight: 98 kg (216 lb)
- Position: Defender / Ruckman

Playing career^{1}
Years	Club	Games (Goals)
2013–2014	Brisbane Lions	3 (0)
2016	Essendon	2 (0)
Total		5 (0)
- ^{1} Playing statistics correct to the end of 2016.

Career highlights
- NEAFL premiership player: 2012; Andrew Ireland Medal: 2012

Sam Michael (born 5 July 1993) is a former professional Australian rules footballer who played for the Brisbane Lions and Essendon Football Club in the Australian Football League (AFL).

== Early life ==
Michael was raised in Cairns and played junior and senior football with the Manunda Hawks in the AFL Cairns competition. Michael relocated to Brisbane to further his prospects of being drafted to the AFL and represented Queensland at under 18 level in 2010.

In 2012, Michael won the Andrew Ireland Medal, for best on ground on the North East Australian Football League (NEAFL) inter-conference Grand Final.

He was recruited by the Brisbane Lions as a Queensland zone selection from the Redland Australian Football Club in the North East Australian Football League (NEAFL) with the 96th selection in the 2012 Rookie draft.

== AFL career ==
He made his AFL debut against Carlton in round 9 of the 2013 AFL season after being upgraded from the rookie list to replace the injured Claye Beams.

In February 2015, Michael was given a short-term contract by Essendon to play in the 2015 NAB Challenge as a "top-up" player, due to 26 Essendon players withdrawing from the NAB Challenge because of the ongoing supplements controversy. In February 2016, he signed a one-year contract with the club as a top-up player for the 2016 season.

== Early life ==
Sam was born in Brisbane, Australia, and moved to Cairns soon after. He played junior AFL with the Cairns Hawks AFC.

Michael married long-time girlfriend Thea Michael in 2013.

== Statistics ==
Legend
G	Goals	K	Kicks	D	Disposals	T	Tackles
B	Behinds	H	Handballs	M	Marks	H/O	Hit-outs

Season	Team	No.	Games	Totals								Averages (per game)							
Season	Team	No.	Games	G	B	K	H	D	M	T	H/O	G	B	K	H	D	M	T	H/O
2013	Brisbane Lions	46	3	0	0	6	11	17	6	5	18	0.0	0.0	2.0	3.7	5.7	2.0	1.7	6.0
2014	Brisbane Lions	46	0	—	—	—	—	—	—	—	—	—	—	—	—	—	—	—	—
2016	Essendon	56	2	0	0	9	7	16	7	7	19	0.0	0.0	4.5	3.5	8.0	3.5	3.5	9.5
Career			5	0	0	15	18	33	13	12	37	0.0	0.0	3.0	3.6	6.6	2.6	2.4	7.4
