= James Tunstill =

Australian Rules footballer

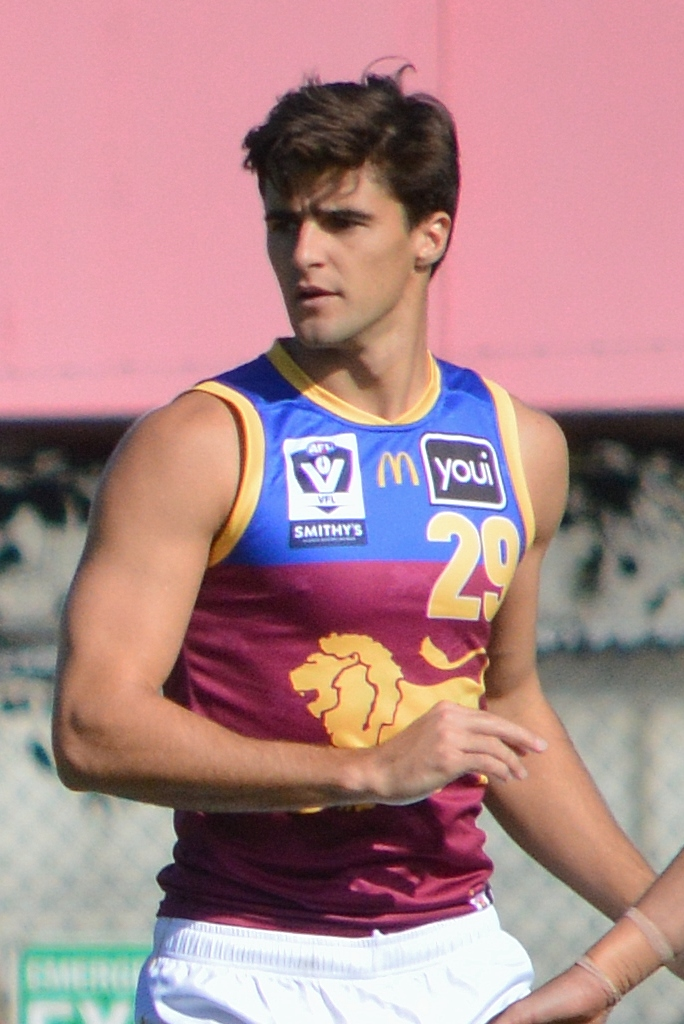
- Tunstill in April 2025

Personal information
- Full name: James Tunstill
- Nickname: Jimmy
- Born: 18 July 2003 (age 23)
- Original team: Busselton (South West Football League)
- Draft: No. 41, 2021 national draft
- Debut: Round 15, 2022, Brisbane Lions vs. Melbourne, at The MCG
- Height: 187 cm (6 ft 2 in)
- Weight: 75 kg (165 lb)
- Position: Midfielder

Club information
- Current club: Brisbane Lions
- Number: 29

Playing career^{1}
| Years | Club | Games (Goals) |
| 2022– | Brisbane Lions | 23 (3) |
- ^{1} Playing statistics correct to the end of round 22, 2026.

Career highlights
- Brisbane reserves best and fairest: 2022; Signature

James "Jimmy" Tunstill (born 18 July 2003) is an Australian rules footballer who plays for the Brisbane Lions in the Australian Football League (AFL). Originally from Western Australia, Tunstill played football for the Busselton Football Club in the South West Football League. He also played for East Perth in the West Australian Football League (WAFL), driving a 450 km round trip from Busselton to play for the side while studying in his final year at school. Tunstill was selected by the Lions with pick 41 in the 2021 national draft.

== AFL career ==
Tunstill made his debut in round 15 of the 2022 AFL season against Melbourne at the MCG. Despite only managing five senior games in two seasons with the Lions, he still signed a two-year contract extension with the team in May 2022.

== Statistics ==
Updated to the end of round 22, 2026.

Legend
| G | Goals | K | Kicks | D | Disposals | T | Tackles |
| B | Behinds | H | Handballs | M | Marks |

| Season | Team | No. | Games | Totals | | | | | | | Averages (per game) | | | | | | | Votes |
| Season | Team | No. | Games | G | B | K | H | D | M | T | G | B | K | H | D | M | T | Votes |
|---|---|---|---|---|---|---|---|---|---|---|---|---|---|---|---|---|---|---|
| 2022 | Brisbane Lions | 29 | 3 | 1 | 0 | 24 | 7 | 31 | 8 | 3 | 0.3 | 0.0 | 8.0 | 2.3 | 10.3 | 2.7 | 1.0 | 0 |
| 2023 | Brisbane Lions | 29 | 2 | 0 | 0 | 5 | 7 | 12 | 2 | 0 | 0.0 | 0.0 | 2.5 | 3.5 | 6.0 | 1.0 | 0.0 | 0 |
| 2024 | Brisbane Lions | 29 | 4 | 0 | 0 | 5 | 15 | 20 | 2 | 5 | 0.0 | 0.0 | 1.3 | 3.8 | 5.0 | 0.5 | 1.3 | 0 |
| 2025 | Brisbane Lions | 29 | 3 | 0 | 0 | 17 | 6 | 23 | 6 | 3 | 0.0 | 0.0 | 5.7 | 2.0 | 7.7 | 2.0 | 1.0 | 0 |
| 2026 | Brisbane Lions | 29 | 11 | 2 | 3 | 85 | 57 | 142 | 46 | 13 | 0.2 | 0.3 | 7.7 | 5.2 | 12.9 | 4.2 | 1.2 | 0 |
| Career | | | 23 | 3 | 3 | 136 | 92 | 228 | 64 | 24 | 0.1 | 0.1 | 5.9 | 4.0 | 9.9 | 2.8 | 1.0 | 0 |
