= Deven Robertson =

Australian rules player

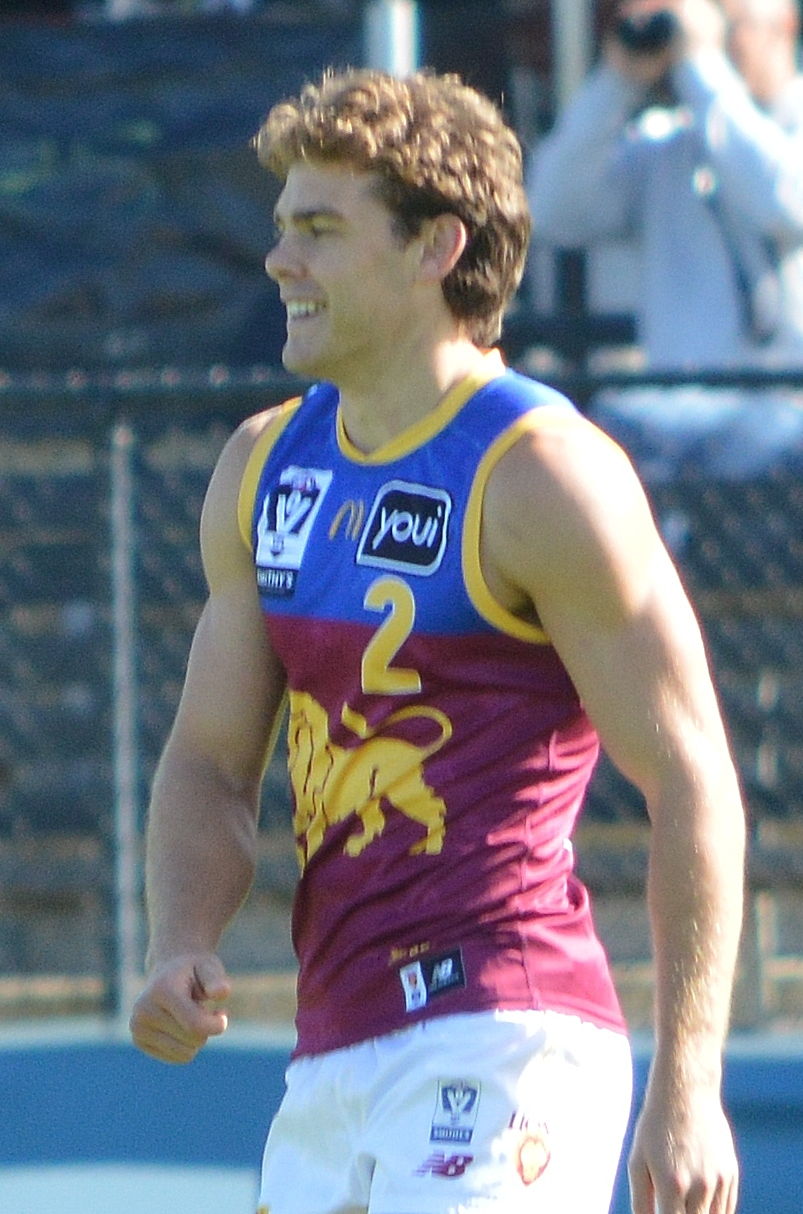
- Robertson in April 2025

Personal information
- Full name: Deven Robertson
- Nickname: 'The Cold Cut'
- Born: 30 June 2001 (age 25); Northam, Western Australia
- Original team: Perth Demons(WAFL)/Manning Rippers(WA)
- Draft: No. 22, 2019 national draft
- Debut: Round 1, 2020, Brisbane Lions vs. Hawthorn, at Melbourne Cricket Ground
- Height: 185 cm (6 ft 1 in)
- Weight: 83 kg (183 lb)
- Position: Forward

Club information
- Current club: West Coast
- Number: 40

Playing career^{1}
Years	Club	Games (Goals)
2020–2025	Brisbane Lions	47 (10)
2026–	West Coast	4 (0)
Total		51 (10)
- ^{1} Playing statistics correct to the end of round 22, 2026.

Career highlights
- Larke Medal: 2019; AFL Rising Star nominee: 2021; VFL Team of the Season: 2024, 2025; Brisbane Lions Reserves Best & Fairest: 2025

Deven Robertson (born 30 June 2001) is an Australian rules footballer who plays for the West Coast Eagles in the Australian Football League (AFL). He previously played for the Brisbane Lions from 2020–2025.

== Early life ==
Robertson grew up in Northam, Western Australia. He played junior football for Manning and also played at high school while boarding at Aquinas College, Perth. His senior football was played with the Perth Football Club in the West Australian Football League. In 2019 captained Western Australia at the 2019 AFL Under 18 Championships and won the Larke Medal as the best player in the tournament. His performance saw him selected by the Brisbane lions with their first pick in the 2019 AFL draft.

== AFL career ==
=== Brisbane Lions (2020–2025) ===
==== Early Career: (2020–2022) ====
Robertson made his debut in Round 1 of the 2020 AFL season against Hawthorn at the MCG. He played 16 games in 2021 and earned a two-year contract extension. He made eight appearances in 2022 including all three of Brisbane’s finals, and was one of Brisbane's best in the 2022 Preliminary Final, accruing 17 disposals and 10 tackles.

==== Grand Final Loss and Trade Request: (2023–2025) ====
He was subject to widespread fanfare following an incident where his guernsey was ripped in a match against Collingwood at Marvel Stadium in Round 23 of the 2023 season. Robertson continued to play with the ripped shirt until he took it off completely following a tackle from Beau McCreery. His ripped shirt was ultimately auctioned off for the Royal Children’s Hospital charity ahead of the 2023 finals, and the incident saw Robertson gain over 20,000 new followers on social media platform Instagram. Overall he played 18 games in 2023, including a grand final appearance in Brisbane's loss against Collingwood, in which he scored a goal. Robertson again extended his contract at the conclusion of the 2023 season, penning a two-year extension to the end of the 2025 season, ending speculation that he would seek a trade to a Western Australian club in 2023.

Robertson was selected in the VFL Team of the Year in both 2024 & 2025, and was the joint winner of Brisbane's Reserves Best & Fairest Award in Brisbane Lions Reserves Best & Fairest alongside Luke Beecken, but his opportunities at AFL level remained limited to only 6 games across both 2024 and 2025, leading him to request a trade to the West Coast Eagles at the conclusion of the 2025 season. Robertson was delisted at the end of the 2025 AFL season to allow him to join the Eagles in the pre-season supplemental selection period.

=== West Coast Eagles (2026–present) ===
On November 25, 2025, the West Coast Eagles officially announced that Robertson had joined the club during the Supplementary Selection Period.

Robertson made his debut for the Eagles in Round 1 of the 2026 AFL season against the Gold Coast Suns. Despite a heavy 59 point defeat, Robertson was one of the best afield, accumulating 17 disposals, 12 tackles and 5 clearances.

Robertson played his 50th AFL match in Round 3 of the 2026 season in a 2 point win over Port Adelaide.

In Round 5 of the 2026 season, Robertson tore his ACL against the Geelong Cats after a collision with Mitchell Edwards. He will miss the remainder of the 2026 season.

== Statistics ==
Updated to the end of round 22, 2026.

Legend
G	Goals	K	Kicks	D	Disposals	T	Tackles
B	Behinds	H	Handballs	M	Marks

Season	Team	No.	Games	Totals							Averages (per game)							Votes
Season	Team	No.	Games	G	B	K	H	D	M	T	G	B	K	H	D	M	T	Votes
2020 (Note: The 2020 season was played with 17 home-and-away matches per team (down from 22) and 16-minute quarters with time on (down from 20-minute quarters with time on) due to the impact of the COVID-19 pandemic.)	Brisbane Lions	2	1	0	0	3	4	7	0	3	0.0	0.0	3.0	4.0	7.0	0.0	3.0	0
2021	Brisbane Lions	2	16	4	2	110	100	210	53	67	0.3	0.1	6.9	6.3	13.1	3.3	4.2	0
2022	Brisbane Lions	2	8	3	0	47	48	95	21	32	0.4	0.0	5.9	6.0	11.9	2.6	4.0	0
2023	Brisbane Lions	2	16	3	2	71	73	144	34	42	0.2	0.1	4.4	4.6	9.0	2.1	2.6	0
2024	Brisbane Lions	2	2	0	0	6	10	16	1	4	0.0	0.0	3.0	5.0	8.0	0.5	2.0	0
2025	Brisbane Lions	2	4	0	0	9	5	14	4	3	0.0	0.0	2.3	1.3	3.5	1.0	0.8	0
2026	West Coast	40	4	0	0	37	37	74	9	22	0.0	0.0	9.3	9.3	18.5	2.3	5.5	0
Career			51	10	4	283	277	560	122	173	0.2	0.1	5.5	5.4	11.0	2.4	3.4	0

== Honours and achievements ==
Individual

- AFL Rising Star nominee: 2021 (round 15)
- Larke Medal: 2019
- VFL Team of the Season: 2024, 2025
- Brisbane Lions Reserves Best & Fairest: 2025
