= 2008 Brisbane Lions season =

Coordinates: 27°29′9″S 153°2′17″E

Brisbane Lions
2008 season
- Chairman: Tony Kelly
- Coach: Leigh Matthews
- Australian Football League: 10th
- NAB Cup: First Round
- Top goalscorer: Daniel Bradshaw (85)
- Highest home attendance: 34,327 vs. Carlton (23 August 2008)
- Lowest home attendance: 22,118 vs. North Melbourne (31 May 2008)
- Average home league attendance: 28,128

This article covers the 2008 AFL season results for the Brisbane Lions.

== Player Changes ==
=== In ===
Player	Original Club	League	via
Travis Johnstone	Melbourne	AFL	2007 Trade Week
Lachlan Henderson	Geelong Falcons	TAC Cup	2007 National Draft - pick #7
Tom Collier	Tassie Mariners	TAC Cup	2007 National Draft - pick #25
James Polkinghorne	Calder Cannons	TAC Cup	2007 National Draft - pick #41
Bradd Dalziell	East Fremantle	WAFL	2007 National Draft - pick #52
Matt Austin	North Ballarat Rebels	TAC Cup	2007 National Draft - pick #56

=== Out ===
Player	New Club	League	via
Chris Johnson	Brisbane Lions (assistant coach)	AFL	Retirement
Chris Scott	Fremantle (assistant coach)	AFL	Retirement
Ben Fixter	Labrador Tigers - Club Development Manager and player	AFLQ	delisted
Marcus Allan	Claremont	WAFL	delisted
Cameron Wood	Collingwood	AFL	2007 Trade Week
Richard Hadley	Carlton	AFL	2007 Trade Week - pick #83

== Results ==
=== NAB Cup ===
Date	Home	Score	Away	Score	Match Information
Date	Home	Score	Away	Score	Venue	Time	Crowd
First Round
14 February	Essendon	2.11.16 (100)	Brisbane Lions	2.8.7 (73)	Carrara Stadium	19:40	10,078

=== Regular season ===
==== Home and away season ====
===== Round 1 (Easter & Season Launch) =====
Round 1
Saturday, 22 March (5:40pm)	West Coast	def.	Brisbane Lions	Subiaco Oval (crowd: 39,591)
6.2 (38); 7.5 (47); 10.7 (67); 14.8 (92)	Q1; Q2; Q3; Final	1.2 (8); 4.4 (28); 9.6 (60); 11.10 (76)

===== Round 2 =====
Round 2
Friday, 28 March (7:40pm)	Brisbane Lions	def.	Collingwood	The Gabba (crowd: 33,867)
3.5 (23); 8.10 (58); 9.14 (68); 13.18 (96)	Q1; Q2; Q3; Final	3.3 (21); 7.5 (47); 12.12 (84); 13.16 (94)

===== Round 3 (Rivalry Round) =====
Round 3
Saturday, 5 April (7:10pm)	Brisbane Lions	def. by	Sydney	The Gabba (crowd: 29,061)
1.2 (8); 5.4 (34); 7.7 (49); 10.11 (71)	Q1; Q2; Q3; Final	3.3 (21); 7.4 (46); 10.6 (66); 13.10 (88)

===== Round 4 =====
Round 4
Saturday, 12 April (7:10pm)	Port Adelaide	def. by	Brisbane Lions	AAMI Stadium (crowd: 25,205)
6.3 (39); 10.5 (65); 15.7 (97); 16.8 (104)	Q1; Q2; Q3; Final	2.2 (14); 4.6 (30); 9.10 (64); 18.16 (124)

===== Round 5 =====
Round 5
Saturday, 19 April (7:10pm)	Brisbane Lions	def. by	Hawthorn	The Gabba (crowd: 30,019)
5.3 (33); 9.7 (61); 14.11 (95); 17.16 (118)	Q1; Q2; Q3; Final	4.5 (29); 10.9 (69); 14.13 (97); 19.16 (130)

===== Round 6 (Anzac Day) =====
Round 6
Saturday, 26 April (1:10pm)	Brisbane Lions	def.	Melbourne	The Gabba (crowd: 22,878)
3.6 (24); 10.13 (73); 15.17 (107); 19.23 (137)	Q1; Q2; Q3; Final	2.1 (13); 5.2 (32); 8.3 (51); 13.7 (85)

===== Round 7 =====
Round 7
Saturday, 3 May (2:10pm)	Geelong	def.	Brisbane Lions	Skilled Stadium (crowd: 23,388)
4.1 (25); 7.6 (48); 11.8 (74); 15.15 (105)	Q1; Q2; Q3; Final	5.6 (36); 6.8 (44); 10.9 (69); 11.12 (78)

===== Round 8 =====
Round 8
Saturday, 17 May (7:10pm)	Carlton	def. by	Brisbane Lions	Telstra Dome (crowd: 38,675)
2.2 (14); 4.8 (32); 9.14 (68); 12.20 (92)	Q1; Q2; Q3; Final	8.3 (51); 11.8 (74); 16.13 (109); 18.17 (125)

===== Round 9 =====
Round 9
Sunday, 25 May (1:10pm)	Brisbane Lions	def.	St Kilda	The Gabba (crowd: 27,566)
3.6 (24); 9.10 (64); 17.11 (113); 21.15 (141)	Q1; Q2; Q3; Final	2.4 (16); 3.6 (24); 6.8 (44); 14.11 (95)

===== Round 10 =====
Round 10
Saturday, 31 May (7:10pm)	Brisbane Lions	def.	North Melbourne	The Gabba (crowd: 22,118)
4.7 (31); 11.12 (78); 15.17 (107); 18.21 (129)	Q1; Q2; Q3; Final	2.2 (14); 6.2 (38); 12.3 (75); 15.8 (98)

===== Round 11 (Queen's Birthday) =====
Round 11
Sunday, 8 June (1:10pm)	Brisbane Lions	def.	Fremantle	The Gabba (crowd: 24,506)
2.1 (13); 8.5 (53); 11.10 (75); 14.12 (96)	Q1; Q2; Q3; Final	2.3 (15); 3.7 (25); 7.9 (51); 10.14 (74)

===== Round 12 =====
Round 12
Saturday, 14 June (2:10pm)	Western Bulldogs	def.	Brisbane Lions	Melbourne Cricket Ground (crowd: 39,320)
2.6 (18); 7.12 (54); 13.15 (87); 19.17 (131)	Q1; Q2; Q3; Final	3.2 (20); 5.4 (34); 8.4 (52); 10.8 (68)

===== Round 13 =====
Round 13
Saturday, 21 June (7:10pm)	Brisbane Lions	def.	Adelaide	The Gabba (crowd: 29,964)
3.3 (21); 4.7 (31); 7.14 (56); 11.17 (83)	Q1; Q2; Q3; Final	2.5 (17); 6.7 (43); 8.10 (58); 10.10 (70)

===== Round 14 (Split Round) =====
Round 14
Sunday, 29 June (1:10pm)	Melbourne	def.	Brisbane Lions	Melbourne Cricket Ground (crowd: 23,278)
5.4 (34); 6.6 (42); 9.8 (62); 14.9 (93)	Q1; Q2; Q3; Final	2.3 (15); 5.9 (39); 7.12 (54); 13.14 (92)

===== Round 15 =====
Round 15
Saturday, 12 July	Essendon	def.	Brisbane Lions	Telstra Dome (crowd: 40,053)
8.3 (51); 12.6 (78); 17.9 (111); 24.11 (155)	Q1; Q2; Q3; Final	4.0 (24); 8.4 (52); 14.8 (92); 18.10 (118)

===== Round 16 =====
Round 16
Saturday, 19 July (7:10pm)	Brisbane Lions	def.	West Coast	The Gabba (crowd: 27,784)
5.4 (34); 11.5 (71); 14.7 (91); 17.11 (113)	Q1; Q2; Q3; Final	3.3 (21); 5.6 (36); 8.10 (58); 9.13 (67)

===== Round 17 =====
Round 17
Saturday, 26 July (7:10pm)	Richmond	def.	Brisbane Lions	Telstra Dome (crowd: 31,275)
2.2 (14); 8.4 (52); 10.7 (67); 18.9 (117)	Q1; Q2; Q3; Final	3.6 (24); 7.8 (50); 13.14 (92); 16.18 (114)

===== Round 18 =====
Round 18
Saturday, 2 August (7:10pm)	North Melbourne	def.	Brisbane Lions	Carrara Stadium (crowd: 10,037)
5.6 (36); 6.9 (45); 10.10 (70); 13.14 (92)	Q1; Q2; Q3; Final	3.3 (21); 8.7 (55); 10.13 (73); 11.18 (84)

===== Round 19 =====
Round 19
Saturday, 9 August (2:10pm)	Hawthorn	def.	Brisbane Lions	Aurora Stadium (crowd: 19,929)
1.5 (11); 3.7 (25); 7.11 (53); 16.14 (110)	Q1; Q2; Q3; Final	1.3 (9); 1.5 (11); 2.10 (22); 5.11 (41)

===== Round 20 =====
Round 20
Saturday, 16 August (7:10pm)	Brisbane Lions	def.	Western Bulldogs	The Gabba (crowd: 27,315)
3.3 (21); 6.4 (40); 8.8 (62); 13.12 (90)	Q1; Q2; Q3; Final	4.4 (28); 7.8 (50); 8.14 (62); 10.19 (79)

===== Round 21 =====
Round 21
Saturday, 23 August (7:10pm)	Brisbane Lions	def. by	Carlton	The Gabba (crowd: 34,327)
3.4 (22); 7.9 (51); 16.12 (108); 16.13 (109)	Q1; Q2; Q3; Final	7.2 (44); 11.3 (69); 12.4 (76); 18.7 (115)

===== Round 22 =====
Round 22
Saturday, 30 August (7:10pm)	Sydney	def.	Brisbane Lions	Sydney Cricket Ground (crowd: 24,076)
3.3 (21); 7.8 (50); 12.9 (81); 17.12 (114)	Q1; Q2; Q3; Final	1.6 (12); 3.9 (27); 5.13 (43); 6.17 (53)

All times are local.
