= 1999 AFL finals series =

1999 AFL premiership season
- Teams: 8
- Premiers: Kangaroos; 4th premiership
- Minor premiers: Essendon

Attendance
- Matches played: 9
- Total attendance: 472,007 (52,445 per match)

The 1999 finals series of the Australian Football League began on 3 September 1999 and ended with the 103rd AFL Grand Final at the Melbourne Cricket Ground on 25 September 1999 contested between the Kangaroos and Carlton. The Kangaroos, (formerly and later known as North Melbourne), emerged victorious to claim their fourth VFL/AFL Premiership.

The top eight teams on the home and away rounds (regular season) ladder qualified for the Finals Series.

== Final Ladder 1999 ==
(P)	Premiers
	Qualified for finals

#	Team	P	W	L	D	PF	PA	%	Pts
1	Essendon	22	18	4	0	2400	1905	126.0	72
2	Kangaroos (P)	22	17	5	0	2463	2129	115.7	68
3	Brisbane Lions	22	16	6	0	2422	1671	144.9	64
4	Western Bulldogs	22	15	6	1	2363	1993	118.6	62
5	West Coast	22	12	10	0	2068	1937	106.8	48
6	Carlton	22	12	10	0	2088	2028	103.0	48
7	Port Adelaide	22	12	10	0	1851	2054	90.1	48
8	Sydney	22	11	11	0	2184	2128	102.6	44
9	Hawthorn	22	10	11	1	1858	1943	95.6	42
10	St Kilda	22	10	12	0	1978	2021	97.9	40
11	Geelong	22	10	12	0	2328	2454	94.9	40
12	Richmond	22	9	13	0	1977	2170	91.1	36
13	Adelaide	22	8	14	0	1903	2232	85.3	32
14	Melbourne	22	6	16	0	1850	2293	80.7	24
15	Fremantle	22	5	17	0	1981	2403	82.4	20
16	Collingwood	22	4	18	0	1973	2326	84.8	16

Rules for classification: 1. premiership points; 2. percentage; 3. points for
Average score: 95.7
Source: AFL Tables Essendon finished one game clear on top of the ladder with 18 wins, and thus claimed its 15th minor premiership. The Kangaroos were second with 17 wins, trailed by the Brisbane Lions in third place with 16 wins, but with the best percentage of any team in the Eight. In fourth place were the Western Bulldogs who finished with 15 wins and a draw. The following three teams (West Coast, Carlton and Port Adelaide) finished with 12 wins each, separated by percentage. Sydney (with 11 wins) rounded out the Eight.

According to the McIntyre final eight system, this was how the first week of finals matches were arranged:

- Essendon vs. Sydney
- Kangaroos vs. Port Adelaide
- Brisbane Lions vs. Carlton
- Western Bulldogs vs. West Coast

The 1999 finals series was probably best remembered by the preliminary final boilover, in which Carlton upset minor premier Essendon by one point at the MCG, which qualified them for an unexpected Grand Final appearance against the Kangaroos.

The 1999 AFL season would also be the last season which used the McIntyre system. It was replaced the following year with the AFL final eight system.

== Match Reports ==
=== Qualifying Final: Western Bulldogs vs. West Coast ===
Team	1	2	3	Final
(4) Western Bulldogs	2.5	4.7	6.9	8.12 (60)
(5) West Coast	2.3	7.5	8.9	9.11 (65)

Date	Friday, 3 September 1999 19:45 AEST
Goals (W. Bulldogs)	4: Kolyniuk; 1: Darcy, Garlick, Southern, West
Goals (W. Coast)	4: Cummings; 2: Wirrpanda; 1: Peter Matera, Rintoul, White
Best	Western Bulldogs: Darcy, Liberatore, Johnson, West, Ellis, Kolyniuk; West Coast: Jakovich, McKenna, Rintoul, Cummings, Banfield, Wirrpanda, Kemp
Injuries	None
Reports	None
Venue	Melbourne Cricket Ground
Attendance	41,227
Umpires	

=== Qualifying Final: Kangaroos vs. Port Adelaide ===
Home team	Score	Away team	Score	Venue	Attendance	Date
Kangaroos	15.10 (100)	Port Adelaide	8.8 (56)	MCG	31,476	Saturday, 4 September

=== Qualifying Final: Brisbane Lions vs. Carlton ===
Home team	Score	Away team	Score	Venue	Attendance	Date
Brisbane Lions	20.18 (138)	Carlton	8.17 (65)	The Gabba	26,112	Saturday, 4 September

=== Qualifying Final: Essendon vs. Sydney ===
Home team	Score	Away team	Score	Venue	Attendance	Date
Essendon	18.15 (123)	Sydney	7.12 (54)	MCG	57,687	Sunday, 5 September

=== Semi-final: West Coast vs. Carlton ===
Home team	Score	Away team	Score	Venue	Attendance	Date
West Coast	10.10 (70)	Carlton	18.16 (124)	MCG	55,682	Saturday, 11 September

=== Semi-final: Brisbane Lions vs. Western Bulldogs ===
Home team	Score	Away team	Score	Venue	Attendance	Date
Brisbane Lions	19.12 (126)	Western Bulldogs	10.13 (73)	The Gabba	24,045	Saturday, 11 September

=== Preliminary Final: Kangaroos vs. Brisbane ===
Home team	Score	Away team	Score	Venue	Attendance	Date
Kangaroos	19.9 (123)	Brisbane Lions	11.12 (78)	MCG	61,031	Friday, 17 September

=== Preliminary Final: Essendon vs. Carlton ===
Home team	Score	Away team	Score	Venue	Attendance	Date
Essendon	14.19 (103)	Carlton	16.8 (104)	MCG	80,519	Saturday, 18 September

=== Grand Final: Kangaroos vs. Carlton ===
Home team	Score	Away team	Score	Venue	Attendance	Date
Kangaroos	19.10 (124)	Carlton	12.17 (89)	MCG	94,228	Saturday, 25 September

== Bibliography ==
- Roberts, Michael (1999). The official AFL yearbook 1999. Australia: Penguin Books Australia Ltd. ISBN 0-670-88825-7.
