= 2012 Brisbane Lions season =

Coordinates: 27°29′9″S 153°2′17″E

Brisbane Lions
2012 season
- Coach: Michael Voss
- Australian Football League: 13th
- NAB Cup: 8th
- Top goalscorer: Jonathan Brown (47)
- Highest home attendance: 27,926 vs. Collingwood (12 May 2012)
- Lowest home attendance: 15,534 vs. Geelong (28 April 2012)
- Average home league attendance: 20,343

This article covers the 2012 AFL season results for the Brisbane Lions.

== Results ==
=== Regular season ===
==== Home and Away Season ====
===== Round 1 =====
Round 1
Saturday, 31 March (1:45pm)	Melbourne	def. by	Brisbane Lions	MCG (crowd: 33,473)	Report
3.3 (21); 7.4 (46); 8.8 (56); 11.12 (78)	Q1; Q2; Q3; Final	1.4 (10); 7.8 (50); 13.13 (91); 17.17 (119)

===== Round 2 =====
Round 2
Thursday, 5 April (7:40pm)	Brisbane Lions	def. by	Carlton	The Gabba (crowd: 25,913)	Report
6.1 (37); 7.6 (48); 7.7 (49); 9.9 (63)	Q1; Q2; Q3; Final	5.5 (35); 10.9 (69); 16.10 (106); 23.16 (154)

===== Round 3 =====
Round 3
Saturday, 14 April (4:40pm)	Fremantle	def.	Brisbane Lions	Subiaco (crowd: 33,473)	Report
1.4 (10); 4.7 (31); 6.13 (49); 8.16 (64)	Q1; Q2; Q3; Final	2.1 (13); 3.2 (20); 5.3 (33); 5.5 (35)

===== Round 4 =====
Round 4
Saturday, 21 April (7:40pm)	Brisbane Lions	def.	Gold Coast	The Gabba (crowd: 21,980)	Report
3.3 (21); 7.4 (46); 12.5 (77); 17.9 (111)	Q1; Q2; Q3; Final	2.4 (16); 5.8 (38); 5.9 (39); 6.10 (46)

===== Round 5 =====
Round 5
Saturday, 28 April (7:45pm)	Brisbane Lions	def. by	Geelong	The Gabba (crowd: 15,534)	Report
0.5 (5); 0.7 (7); 1.9 (15); 4.17 (41)	Q1; Q2; Q3; Final	4.1 (25); 7.5 (47); 10.6 (66); 12.7 (79)

===== Round 6 =====
Round 6
Saturday, 5 May (1:40pm)	Essendon	def.	Brisbane Lions	Docklands (crowd: 36,361)	Report
8.3 (51); 12.9 (81); 16.12 (108); 19.15 (129)	Q1; Q2; Q3; Final	4.1 (25); 7.4 (46); 8.4 (52); 9.8 (62)

===== Round 7 =====
Round 7
Saturday, 12 May (7:40pm)	Brisbane Lions	def. by	Collingwood	The Gabba (crowd: 27,926)	Report
2.1 (13); 3.7 (25); 7.9 (51); 8.10 (58)	Q1; Q2; Q3; Final	6.4 (48); 9.7 (61); 12.12 (84); 17.14 (116)

===== Round 8 =====
Round 8
Sunday, 20 May (1:10pm)	Brisbane Lions	def.	Greater Western Sydney	The Gabba (crowd: 16,049)	Report
7.3 (45); 10.9 (69); 13.14 (92); 19.18 (132)	Q1; Q2; Q3; Final	1.2 (8); 3.5 (23); 4.5 (29); 5.10 (40)

===== Round 9 =====
Round 9
Sunday, 27 May (1:10pm)	North Melbourne	def.	Brisbane Lions	Docklands (crowd: 19,988)	Report
6.4 (40); 13.8 (86); 15.8 (98); 17.10 (112)	Q1; Q2; Q3; Final	3.2 (20); 5.4 (34); 11.6 (72); 15.6 (96)

===== Round 10 =====
Round 10
Sunday, 3 June (1:10pm)	Brisbane Lions	def.	West Coast	The Gabba (crowd: 15,546)	Report
3.3 (21); 7.4 (46); 8.3 (53); 16.6 (102)	Q1; Q2; Q3; Final	2.1 (13); 5.5 (35); 10.7 (67); 15.10 (100)

===== Round 11 =====
Bye

===== Round 12 =====
Round 12
Sunday, 17 June (1:10pm)	Hawthorn	def.	Brisbane Lions	MCG (crowd: 35,492)	Report
4.6 (30); 8.12 (60); 12.19 (91); 19.21 (135)	Q1; Q2; Q3; Final	6.1 (37); 7.2 (44); 8.2 (50); 11.4 (70)

===== Round 13 =====
Round 13
Saturday, 23 June (1:40pm)	Western Bulldogs	def. by	Brisbane Lions	Docklands (crowd: 20,146)	Report
2.3 (15); 5.6 (36); 5.10 (40); 7.14 (56)	Q1; Q2; Q3; Final	6.1 (37); 8.5 (53); 12.5 (77); 18.6 (114)

===== Round 14 =====
Round 14
Sunday, 1 July (3:15pm)	Brisbane Lions	def.	Melbourne	The Gabba (crowd: 22,144)	Report
6.1 (37); 9.6 (60); 13.11 (89); 18.14 (122)	Q1; Q2; Q3; Final	3.6 (24); 3.8 (26); 4.11 (35); 8.13 (61)

===== Round 15 =====
Round 15
Saturday, 7 July (4:40pm)	Sydney	def.	Brisbane Lions	SCG (crowd: 19,419)	Report
4.2 (26); 10.7 (67); 15.12 (102); 16.14 (110)	Q1; Q2; Q3; Final	3.4 (22); 7.4 (46); 8.7 (55); 9.9 (63)

===== Round 16 =====
Round 16
Saturday, 14 July (7:40pm)	Brisbane Lions	def. by	St Kilda	The Gabba (crowd: 19,228)	Report
3.3 (21); 7.5 (47); 10.6 (66); 14.8 (92)	Q1; Q2; Q3; Final	4.0 (24); 6.1 (37); 10.7 (67); 16.9 (105)

===== Round 17 =====
Round 17
Saturday, 21 July (4:40pm)	Gold Coast	def.	Brisbane Lions	Carrara (crowd: 16,550)	Report
0.5 (5); 3.7 (25); 4.10 (34); 5.18 (48)	Q1; Q2; Q3; Final	3.2 (20); 5.6 (36); 6.10 (46); 8.11 (59)

===== Round 18 =====
Round 18
Sunday, 29 July (4:40pm)	West Coast	def.	Brisbane Lions	Subiaco (crowd: 35,767)	Report
7.4 (46); 11.5 (71); 17.6 (108); 28.7 (175)	Q1; Q2; Q3; Final	2.0 (12); 5.2 (32); 7.3 (45); 12.5 (77)

===== Round 19 =====
Round 19
Saturday, 4 August (7:40pm)	Brisbane Lions	def. by	Richmond	The Gabba (crowd: 22,193)	Report
3.3 (20); 4.9 (33); 7.12 (54); 12.12 (84)	Q1; Q2; Q3; Final	3.3 (21); 8.5 (53); 14.8 (92); 20.12 (132)

===== Round 20 =====
Round 20
Saturday, 11 August (7:40pm)	Carlton	def.	Brisbane Lions	Docklands (crowd: 25,977)	Report
2.2 (14); 6.6 (42); 13.11 (89); 17.11 (113)	Q1; Q2; Q3; Final	2.6 (18); 4.11 (35); 5.13 (43); 10.17 (77)

===== Round 21 =====
Round 21
Saturday, 18 August (7:40pm)	Brisbane Lions	def.	Adelaide	The Gabba (crowd: 18,979)	Report
0.3 (3); 5.9 (39); 10.15 (75); 13.17 (95)	Q1; Q2; Q3; Final	6.5 (41); 7.8 (50); 10.9 (69); 12.13 (85)

===== Round 22 =====
Round 22
Sunday, 25 August (2:10pm)	Port Adelaide	def. by	Brisbane Lions	Football Park (crowd: 13,953)	Report
5.2 (32); 8.3 (51); 14.8 (92); 14.9 (93)	Q1; Q2; Q3; Final	5.3 (33); 10.6 (66); 12.7 (79); 16.8 (104)

===== Round 23 =====
Round 23
Sunday, 2 September (4:40pm)	Brisbane Lions	def.	Western Bulldogs	The Gabba (crowd: 18,289)	Report
1.4 (10); 9.7 (61); 14.12 (96); 19.14 (128)	Q1; Q2; Q3; Final	0.3 (3); 2.5 (17); 4.6 (30); 9.7 (61)

All times are local.
