= 2005 Brisbane Lions season =

Brisbane Lions
2005 season
- Coach: Leigh Matthews (rounds 1–17, 19–22); John Blakey (round 18)
- Captain: Michael Voss
- Home ground: The Gabba (Capacity: 42,000)
- AFL season: 11th
- Best and fairest: Jason Akermanis
- Leading goalkicker: Daniel Bradshaw (42 goals)
- Highest home attendance: 37,224 vs. Collingwood (9 July 2005)
- Lowest home attendance: 29,500 vs. Kangaroos (28 May 2005)
- Average home attendance: 33,266
- Club membership: 30,027

The Brisbane Lions' 2005 season was its ninth season in the Australian Football League (AFL).

== Season summary ==
=== Pre-season ===
==== 2005 Wizard Home Loans Cup ====
Round 1
Saturday, 19 February (7:40pm)	Brisbane Lions	def. by	Melbourne	Cazaly's Stadium, Cairns (crowd: 9,486)
0.0.2 (2); 0.3.4 (22); 0.5.6 (36); 0.7.11 (53)	Q1; Q2; Q3; Final	1.0.3 (12); 2.5.5 (53); 3.9.7 (89); 3.10.11 (98)	Umpires: J. Quigley, J. Schmitt, D. Morris, S. Jeffery; Television broadcast: Fox Footy Channel
None	Super Goals	2 Wheatley; 1 Bruce
Bradshaw 3 Corrie 1 Power 1 Rischitelli 1 Spaanderman 1	Goals	4 Robertson; 2 McLean; 2 Yze; 1 Bruce; 1 Neitz
Corrie, Power, Michael, Bradshaw, Hadley, Leppitsch	Best	Bizzell, Green, Robertson, Rivers, Whelan, McLean, Yze
Johnson (cut head)	Injuries	Nil
Nil	Reports	Nil

=== Premiership Season ===
==== Home and away season ====
Rd	Date and local time	Opponent	Scores		Venue	Attendance
Rd	Date and local time	Opponent	Brisbane	Opponent	Venue	Attendance
1	24 March (7:40 pm)	St Kilda	116	93	The Gabba (H)	33,369
2	2 April (7:10 pm)	Port Adelaide	73	75	Football Park (A)	34,892
3	9 April (7:10 pm)	Sydney	81	87	The Gabba (H)	33,960
4	16 April (2:10 pm)	Hawthorn	69	115	MCG (A)	27,778
5	24 April (1:10 pm)	West Coast	84	157	The Gabba (H)	33,007
6	30 April (7:10 pm)	Essendon	136	88	Docklands Stadium (A)	44,055
7	7 May (7:10 pm)	Western Bulldogs	87	110	The Gabba (H)	30,639
8	14 May (7:10 pm)	Adelaide	72	63	Football Park (A)	42,357
9	21 May (7:10 pm)	Richmond	83	87	The Gabba (H)	33,684
10	28 May (7:10 pm)	Kangaroos	93	112	The Gabba (H)	29,500
11	4 June (5:40 pm)	Fremantle	106	67	Subiaco Oval (A)	34,143
12	11 June (7:10 pm)	Carlton	140	82	Docklands Stadium (A)	37,880
13	19 June (1:10 pm)	Geelong	116	47	The Gabba (H)	31,307
14	2 July (7:10 pm)	Melbourne	166	92	The Gabba (A)	31,259
15	9 July (7:10 pm)	Collingwood	133	55	The Gabba (H)	37,224
16	16 July (5:40 pm)	West Coast	88	111	Subiaco Oval (A)	41,524
17	23 July (7:10 pm)	Essendon	114	101	The Gabba (H)	36,077
18	30 July (7:10 pm)	Western Bulldogs	123	151	Docklands Stadium (A)	29,200
19	7 August (1:10 pm)	Hawthorn	121	80	The Gabba (H)	31,946
20	14 August (1:10 pm)	Sydney	40	124	Stadium Australia (A)	43,512
21	20 August (7:10 pm)	Port Adelaide	51	81	The Gabba (H)	35,221
22	27 August (7:10 pm)	St Kilda	47	186	Docklands Stadium (A)	46,105

== Ladder ==
2005 AFL ladder
Pos	Team	Pld	W	L	D	PF	PA	PP	Pts	
1	Adelaide	22	17	5	0	2070	1517	136.5	68	Finals series
2	West Coast	22	17	5	0	2261	1824	124.0	68	Finals series
3	Sydney (P)	22	15	7	0	1974	1696	116.4	60	Finals series
4	St Kilda	22	14	8	0	2407	1806	133.3	56	Finals series
5	Kangaroos	22	13	9	0	2053	2069	99.2	52	Finals series
6	Geelong	22	12	10	0	2134	1906	112.0	48	Finals series
7	Melbourne	22	12	10	0	2171	2266	95.8	48	Finals series
8	Port Adelaide	22	11	10	1	2028	2066	98.2	46	Finals series
9	Western Bulldogs	22	11	11	0	2385	2351	101.4	44	
10	Fremantle	22	11	11	0	2041	2038	100.1	44	
11	Brisbane Lions	22	10	12	0	2139	2164	98.8	40	
12	Richmond	22	10	12	0	2022	2190	92.3	40	
13	Essendon	22	8	14	0	2118	2302	92.0	32	
14	Hawthorn	22	5	17	0	1904	2317	82.2	20	
15	Collingwood	22	5	17	0	1884	2425	77.7	20	
16	Carlton	22	4	17	1	2016	2670	75.5	18	

Source: AFL ladder
Rules for classification: 1) points; 2) percentage; 3) number of points for.
(P) Premiers
