= 1998 Brisbane Lions season =

Brisbane Lions
1998 season
- Coach: John Northey (until round 11); Roger Merrett (from round 12)
- Captain: Alastair Lynch/Michael Voss
- Home ground: The Gabba (Capacity: 42,000)
- AFL season: 16th
- Best and fairest: Chris Scott
- Leading goalkicker: Justin Leppitsch (26 goals)
- Highest home attendance: 19,509 vs. Adelaide (23 May 1998)
- Lowest home attendance: 14,738 vs. Hawthorn (15 August 1998)
- Average home attendance: 16,675
- Club membership: 19,913

The Brisbane Lions' 1998 season was its second season in the Australian Football League (AFL).

== Season summary ==
=== Premiership Season ===
==== Home and away season ====
Rd	Date and local time	Opponent	Scores		Venue	Attendance
Rd	Date and local time	Opponent	Brisbane	Opponent	Venue	Attendance
1	28 March (8:40 pm)	Western Bulldogs	72	118	The Gabba (H)	18,788
2	4 April (7:40 pm)	Sydney	97	135	Sydney Cricket Ground (A)	32,111
3	13 April (2:10 pm)	Melbourne	87	100	The Gabba (H)	17,161
4	19 April (2:10 pm)	North Melbourne	120	137	Melbourne Cricket Ground (A)	22,688
5	25 April (2:10 pm)	Hawthorn	83	124	Waverley Park (A)	22,366
6	1 May (7:40 pm)	Richmond	86	51	The Gabba (H)	19,219
7	9 May (2:10 pm)	St Kilda	99	82	Waverley Park (A)	23,960
8	15 May (7:40 pm)	Essendon	70	84	Melbourne Cricket Ground (A)	35,384
9	23 May (7:40 pm)	Adelaide	50	98	The Gabba (H)	19,509
10	30 May (2:10 pm)	Carlton	87	111	Princes Park (A)	18,317
11	7 June (2:10 pm)	Fremantle	50	121	Subiaco Oval (A)	17,452
12	14 June (2:10 pm)	Port Adelaide	123	123	The Gabba (H)	15,924
13	20 June (2:10 pm)	Geelong	106	80	Kardinia Park (A)	21,833
14	28 June (2:40 pm)	Collingwood	135	83	The Gabba (H)	17,275
15	4 July (7:40 pm)	West Coast	49	76	The Gabba (H)	15,369
16	18 July (2:10 pm)	Western Bulldogs	86	177	Princes Park (A)	16,131
17	26 July (2:10 pm)	Sydney	89	149	The Gabba (H)	15,475
18	1 August (2:10 pm)	Melbourne	56	151	Melbourne Cricket Ground (A)	16,518
19	7 August (7:40 pm)	North Melbourne	86	113	The Gabba (H)	14,973
20	15 August (7:40 pm)	Hawthorn	59	94	The Gabba (H)	14,738
21	22 August (2:10 pm)	Richmond	78	155	Melbourne Cricket Ground (A)	27,912
22	29 August (7:40 pm)	St Kilda	92	91	The Gabba (H)	14,993

== Ladder ==
(P)	Premiers
	Qualified for finals

#	Team	P	W	L	D	PF	PA	%	Pts
1	North Melbourne	22	16	6	0	2486	2117	117.4	64
2	Western Bulldogs	22	15	7	0	2353	2019	116.5	60
3	Sydney	22	14	8	0	2283	2143	106.5	56
4	Melbourne	22	14	8	0	2009	1956	102.7	56
5	Adelaide (P)	22	13	9	0	2172	1763	123.2	52
6	St Kilda	22	13	9	0	2148	2104	102.1	52
7	West Coast	22	12	10	0	1940	1773	109.4	48
8	Essendon	22	12	10	0	2250	2071	108.6	48
9	Richmond	22	12	10	0	2018	1926	104.8	48
10	Port Adelaide	22	9	12	1	1928	2017	95.6	38
11	Carlton	22	9	13	0	2018	2109	95.7	36
12	Geelong	22	9	13	0	1777	1963	90.5	36
13	Hawthorn	22	8	14	0	1992	2083	95.6	32
14	Collingwood	22	7	15	0	1968	2167	90.8	28
15	Fremantle	22	7	15	0	1739	2277	76.4	28
16	Brisbane Lions	22	5	16	1	1860	2453	75.8	22

Rules for classification: 1. premiership points; 2. percentage; 3. points for
Average score: 93.6
Source: AFL Tables

== Notes ==
- The Lions' 1998 wooden spoon came in a year in which their National Rugby League neighbours, the Brisbane Broncos, won the premiership.
- Most of the players on the Lions' 1998 playing list would later feature in their run of three consecutive premierships between 2001–03.
