= 2000 Brisbane Lions season =

Brisbane Lions
2000 season
- Coach: Leigh Matthews
- Captain: Alastair Lynch/Michael Voss
- Home ground: The Gabba (Capacity: 42,000)
- AFL season: 6th
- Finals series: Semi-finalists
- Best and fairest: Michael Voss
- Leading goalkicker: Alastair Lynch (68 goals)
- Highest home attendance: 34,743 vs. Carlton (25 June 2000)
- Lowest home attendance: 21,956 vs. Port Adelaide (16 July 2000)
- Average home attendance: 27,406
- Club membership: 20,295

The Brisbane Lions' 2000 season was its fourth season in the Australian Football League (AFL).

== Season summary ==
=== Premiership Season ===
==== Home and away season ====
Rd	Date and local time	Opponent	Scores		Venue	Attendance
Rd	Date and local time	Opponent	Brisbane	Opponent	Venue	Attendance
1	13 March (2:10 pm)	Carlton	112	152	Princes Park (A)	22,374
2	19 March (7:40 pm)	Western Bulldogs	139	110	Docklands Stadium (A)	24,460
3	25 March (2:10 pm)	Hawthorn	103	110	MCG (A)	20,374
4	2 April (1:40 pm)	Port Adelaide	106	149	Football Park (A)	24,458
5	8 April (7:40 pm)	Adelaide	122	92	The Gabba (H)	26,395
6	15 April (7:40 pm)	St Kilda	105	66	Docklands Stadium (A)	18,194
7	25 April (2:10 pm)	Fremantle	100	111	Subiaco Oval (A)	19,800
8	1 May (7:40 pm)	Essendon	63	127	The Gabba (H)	31,887
9	7 May (2:40 pm)	Collingwood	146	117	The Gabba (H)	29,046
10	15 May (7:00 pm)	Melbourne	84	102	Docklands Stadium (A)	24,908
11	21 May (3:20 pm)	Sydney	110	107	SCG (A)	19,789
12	27 May (7:40 pm)	Richmond	99	111	The Gabba (H)	29,967
13	3 June (7:40 pm)	West Coast	173	89	The Gabba (H)	23,359
14	9 June (7:40 pm)	Kangaroos	112	116	Docklands Stadium (A)	26,326
15	17 June (2:10 pm)	Geelong	128	59	Kardinia Park (A)	21,003
16	25 June (2:40 pm)	Collingwood	112	156	The Gabba (H)	34,743
17	2 July (2:40 pm)	Western Bulldogs	138	81	The Gabba (H)	24,662
18	9 July (3:20 pm)	Hawthorn	106	124	The Gabba (H)	26,782
19	16 July (12:40 pm)	Port Adelaide	120	53	The Gabba (H)	21,956
20	23 July (1:40 pm)	Adelaide	115	78	Football Park (A)	40,817
21	29 July (7:40 pm)	St Kilda	153	63	The Gabba (H)	25,603
22	5 August (7:40 pm)	Fremantle	156	49	The Gabba (H)	25,070

==== Finals series ====
Rd	Date and local time	Opponent	Scores		Venue	Attendance
Rd	Date and local time	Opponent	Brisbane	Opponent	Venue	Attendance
Second elimination final	12 August (7:45 pm)	Western Bulldogs	110	76	The Gabba	25,925
Second semi-final	19 August (2:30 pm)	Carlton	69	151	MCG	56,924

== Ladder ==
(P)	Premiers
	Qualified for finals

#	Team	P	W	L	D	PF	PA	%	Pts
1	Essendon (P)	22	21	1	0	2816	1770	159.1	84
2	Carlton	22	16	6	0	2667	1979	134.8	64
3	Melbourne	22	14	8	0	2557	2159	118.4	56
4	Kangaroos	22	14	8	0	2447	2304	106.2	56
5	Geelong	22	12	9	1	2234	2306	96.9	50
6	Brisbane Lions	22	12	10	0	2602	2222	117.1	48
7	Western Bulldogs	22	12	10	0	2321	2241	103.6	48
8	Hawthorn	22	12	10	0	2198	2251	97.6	48
9	Richmond	22	11	11	0	2068	2221	93.1	44
10	Sydney	22	10	12	0	2254	2219	101.6	40
11	Adelaide	22	9	13	0	2255	2347	96.1	36
12	Fremantle	22	8	14	0	1886	2618	72.0	32
13	West Coast	22	7	14	1	2216	2399	92.4	30
14	Port Adelaide	22	7	14	1	1928	2295	84.0	30
15	Collingwood	22	7	15	0	2089	2431	85.9	28
16	St Kilda	22	2	19	1	1855	2631	70.5	10

Rules for classification: 1. premiership points; 2. percentage; 3. points for
Average score: 103.4
Source: AFL Tables
