= Jamie Charman =

Australian rules footballer

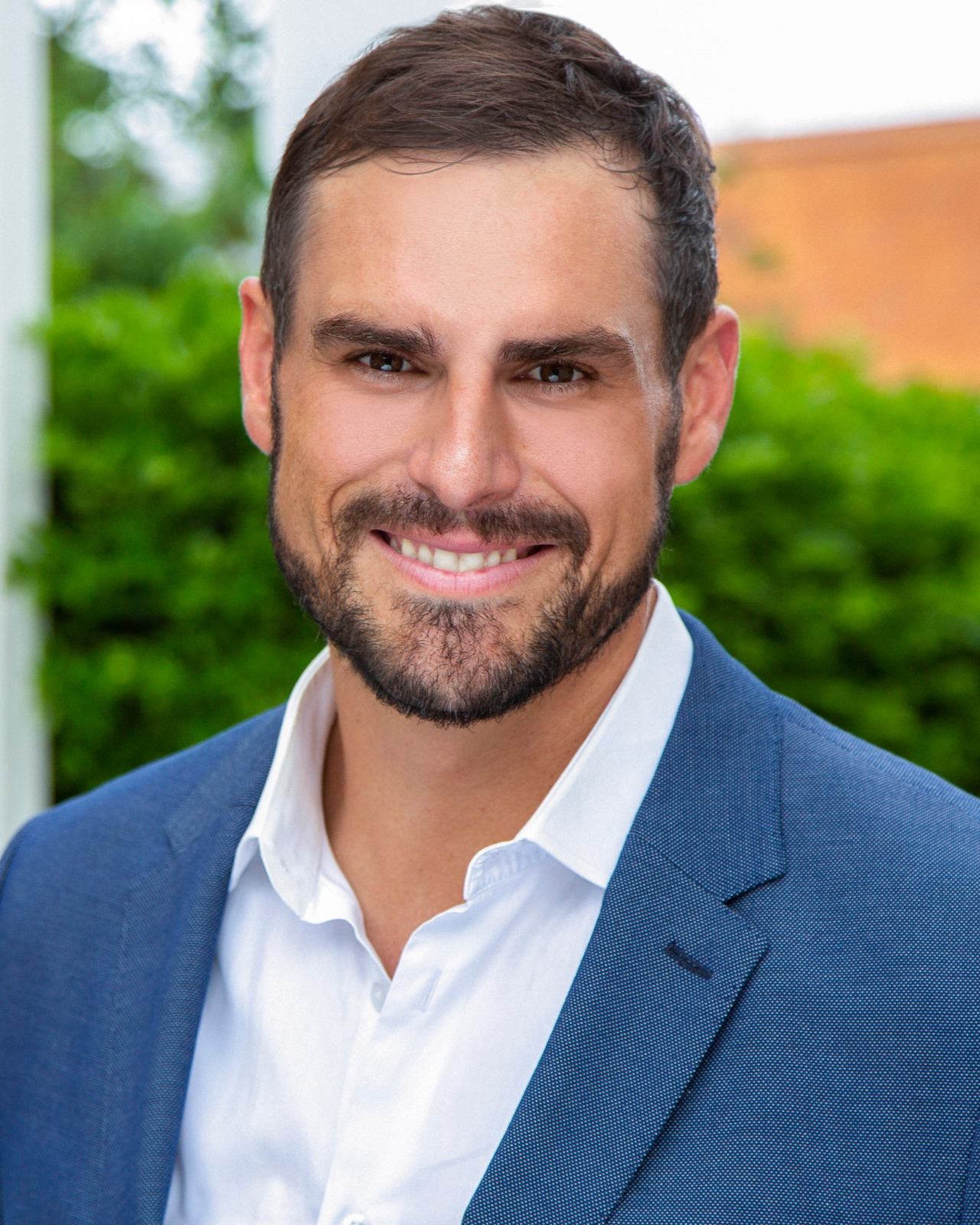

Personal information
- Full name: Jamie Charman
- Born: 16 July 1982 (age 44); Maryborough, Queensland
- Original team: Sandgate Football Club (QAFL)
- Draft: No. 29, 2000 National Draft, Brisbane Lions
- Height: 200 cm (6 ft 7 in)
- Weight: 104 kg (229 lb)
- Position: Ruckman

Playing career^{1}
Years	Club	Games (Goals)
2001–2009	Brisbane Lions	129 (55)

Representative team honours
Years	Team	Games (Goals)
2008	Dream Team	1 (0)
- ^{1} Playing statistics correct to the end of 2011.

Career highlights
- AFL premiership player: 2003; AFLQ premiership player: 2001

Jamie Charman (born 16 July 1982) is a former Australian rules footballer who played for the Brisbane Lions in the Australian Football League (AFL).

== Early life ==
Charman was born in Maryborough in Queensland. His father Eddie had moved to Maryborough from Euroa in Victoria. He was raised in Brisbane and attended St Joseph's College, Nudgee where he played for the school in Year (1996 to 1999) Charman began playing Australian football at the age of 7 at Sandgate Football Club, encouraged by his father who was a member of Euroa's Team of the Century. Charman snubbed rugby at Nudgee to continue pursue Australian rules at club level. In 2000 he moved to Cairns, Queensland to study education where he briefly played in the AFL Cairns junior competition. Charman was also a champion swimmer, coming 3rd in backstroke at the Queensland Under 18 national carnival. However he chose to stick with football with Sandgate and his decision paid off as he was recruited by Brisbane with the 29th pick in the 2000 AFL draft.

== AFL career ==
Charman made his debut for the Brisbane Lions in Round 5, 2001 against Fremantle. He played for Brisbane's reserves team in the winning 2001 AFLQ State League Grand Final. He also played in the Lions' 2003 AFL Grand Final win over Collingwood.

He became renowned for his crash and bash approach to ruckwork, similar to that of former teammate Clark Keating (former Brisbane Lions ruck coach).

Charman retired on 3 August 2011 due to an ongoing Achilles tendon injury.

== Post-AFL ==
In late 2011, Charman joined NRL side the North Queensland Cowboys as a part-time kicking and catching coach.

Charman played two games for the Glenorchy Football Club in the 2014 TSL season.

== Statistics ==
Legend
G	Goals	K	Kicks	D	Disposals	T	Tackles
B	Behinds	H	Handballs	M	Marks

Season	Team	No.	Games	Totals							Averages (per game)						
Season	Team	No.	Games	G	B	K	H	D	M	T	G	B	K	H	D	M	T
2001	Brisbane Lions	19	2	0	0	3	3	6	2	0	0.0	0.0	1.5	1.5	3.0	1.0	0.0
2002	Brisbane Lions	19	20	2	1	82	57	139	60	35	0.1	0.1	4.1	2.9	7.0	3.0	1.8
2003	Brisbane Lions	19	26	9	10	109	113	222	81	39	0.3	0.4	4.2	4.3	8.5	3.1	1.5
2004	Brisbane Lions	19	15	8	2	78	59	137	54	21	0.5	0.1	5.2	3.9	9.1	3.6	1.4
2005	Brisbane Lions	19	9	3	1	50	31	81	33	15	0.3	0.1	5.6	3.4	9.0	3.7	1.7
2006	Brisbane Lions	19	16	12	9	141	68	209	71	32	0.8	0.6	8.8	4.3	13.1	4.4	2.0
2007	Brisbane Lions	19	17	10	4	113	101	214	63	51	0.6	0.2	6.6	5.9	12.6	3.7	3.0
2008	Brisbane Lions	19	21	11	4	109	103	212	66	46	0.5	0.2	5.2	4.9	10.1	3.1	2.2
2009	Brisbane Lions	19	3	0	0	11	13	24	4	3	0.0	0.0	3.7	4.3	8.0	1.3	1.0
Career			129	55	31	696	548	1244	434	242	0.4	0.2	5.4	4.2	9.6	3.4	1.9
