= Claye Beams =

Australian rules footballer

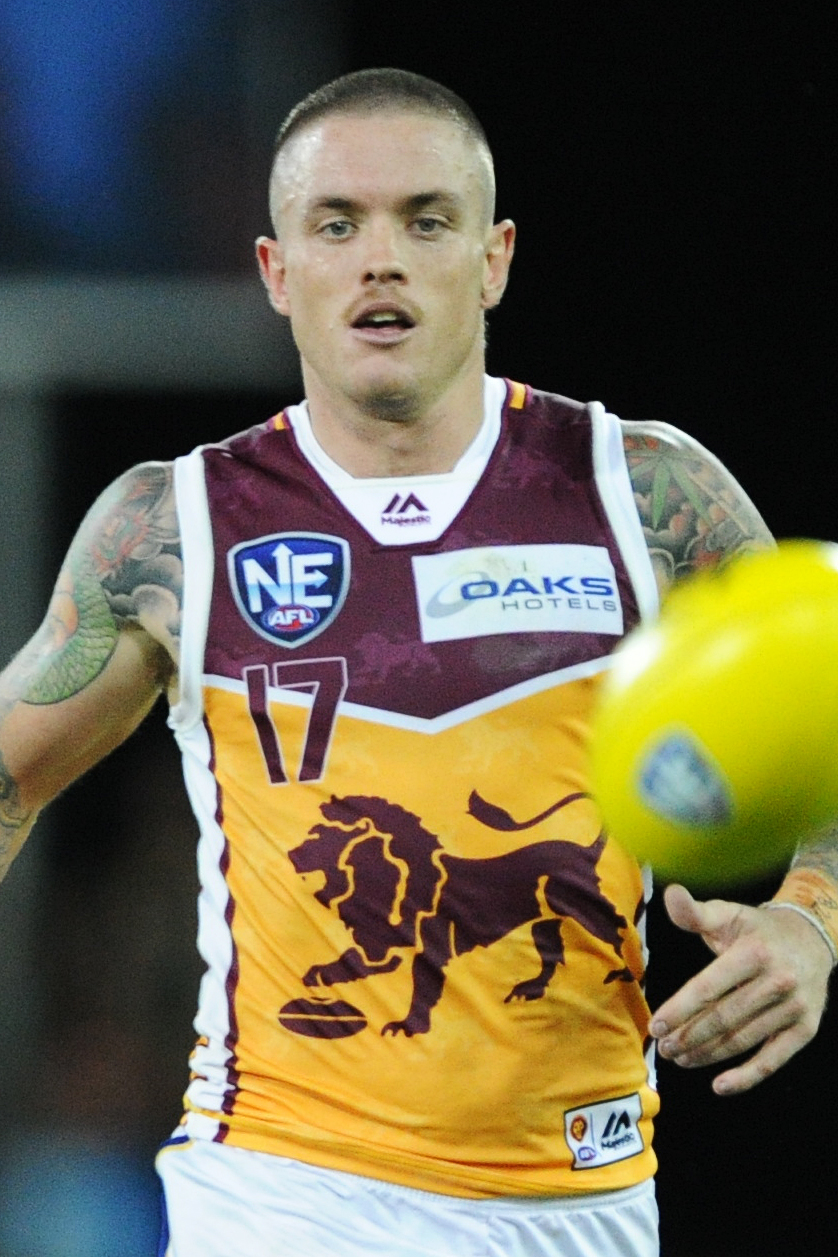
- Beams in April 2018

Personal information
- Full name: Clayton Beams
- Born: 1 September 1991 (age 35)
- Original team: Labrador (AFLQ)
- Draft: No. 76, 2010 rookie draft, Brisbane Lions; No. 65 (RP), 2010 national draft, Brisbane Lions; No. 1, 2018 rookie draft, Brisbane Lions
- Height: 182 cm (6 ft 0 in)
- Weight: 85 kg (187 lb)
- Position: Midfield

Playing career^{1}
Years	Club	Games (Goals)
2011–2018	Brisbane Lions	54 (27)
- ^{1} Playing statistics correct to the end of 2018.

Career highlights
- 2012 AFL Rising Star nominee; NEAFL premiership player: 2012

Clayton Beams (born 1 September 1991), is a former Australian rules footballer who played for the Brisbane Lions in the Australian Football League (AFL).

== Early life ==
Claye was born on 1 September 1991 (the younger brother of former Brisbane Lions captain and former Collingwood premiership player Dayne Beams) and moved with his family from Yarrawonga, Victoria to the Gold Coast at the age of two.

He was selected by the Brisbane Lions as a priority Queensland rookie selection (pick 76 overall) in the 2009 Rookie Draft from AFLQ club Labrador. He had only joined the Labrador team a few months earlier after seeing his brother Dayne perform well for Collingwood in the AFL.

On the back of strong performances in the Lions reserves side throughout 2010 and his selection in the Queensland state side, Beams was officially elevated at the 2010 AFL draft and commenced the 2011 AFL season on the Lions senior list.

== AFL career ==
Beams made his debut against Fremantle in Round 1 at the Gabba, with 13 disposals. He played five of the first seven games of the season before breaking his foot and did not play for the remainder of the year.

Beams played in the round 1 victory against Melbourne and was rewarded the round 1 nomination for the 2012 AFL Rising Star for tagging Brent Moloney out of the game, whilst still collecting 25 possessions himself. He was the first Lion to be nominated since Jack Redden in 2010.

In October 2017, Beams was delisted by Brisbane, but was later redrafted as a rookie.

In September 2018, Beams was delisted again by Brisbane.
