= Matthew Kennedy (footballer, born 1970) =

Australian rules footballer

Personal information
- Full name: Matthew Kennedy
- Born: 4 February 1970 (age 56)
- Original team: Southport (QAFL)
- Height: 191 cm (6 ft 3 in)
- Weight: 98 kg (216 lb)
- Position: Wing

Playing career^{1}
Years	Club	Games (Goals)
1990–1996	Brisbane Bears	113 (25)
1997–2001	Brisbane Lions	75 (5)
Total		188 (30)
- ^{1} Playing statistics correct to the end of 2001.

Matthew Kennedy (born 4 February 1970) is a former Australian rules footballer who played in the Australian Football League (AFL).

== Early life ==
Kennedy grew up on the Gold Coast where he played junior football for both Surfers Paradise and Southport. He is the son of former St Kilda player Des Kennedy.

== AFL career ==
Kennedy played during the 1990s and early 2000s for both the Brisbane Bears and the Brisbane Lions after the Bears merged with Fitzroy in 1996. After 188 games of league football, which included the 2001 preliminary final, he retired at the end of the 2001 season, the year Brisbane won the first of their three consecutive flags.
