= Robert Copeland (footballer) =

Australian rules footballer

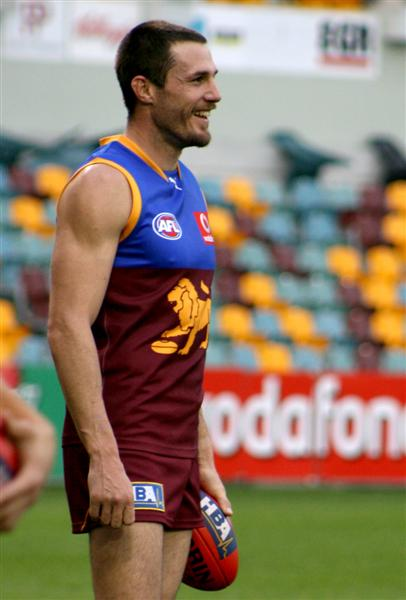
- Copeland at a training session in 2008

Personal information
- Full name: Robert Copeland
- Nickname: Bushie
- Born: 26 May 1981 (age 45); Redcliffe, Queensland
- Original team: Northern Eagles AFC
- Draft: 66th selection, 2001 Rookie Draft
- Height: 187 cm (6 ft 2 in)
- Weight: 85 kg (187 lb)
- Position: Half back

Playing career^{1}
Years	Club	Games (Goals)
2001–2008	Brisbane Lions	143 (39)
- ^{1} Playing statistics correct to the end of 2008.

Career highlights
- Premiership player: 2001, 2003

Robert Copeland (born 26 May 1981) is a former Australian Football League footballer for the Brisbane Lions and former captain of the Aspley hornets in the NEAFL. He is a dual premiership winner (2001, 2003) and was delisted in 2008.

== Early life and junior football ==
Copeland was born in Redcliffe, Queensland and raised in Kilcoy. He played his junior football with the Strathpine Swans in Brisbane's northern suburbs.

Overlooked in successive AFL Drafts, Copeland was recruited to the Brisbane Lions through the 2001 Rookie Draft (QLD Zone) from the Northern Eagles and was elevated to the Senior list on 10 May that year after Michael Voss was placed on the long-term injury list.

== AFL career ==
Copeland made his debut for the Brisbane Lions in Round 9, 2001 against Adelaide. Copeland was regularly employed in a tagging role. Copeland's tagging job on Collingwood Captain, Nathan Buckley in the 2003 AFL Grand Final was considered a decisive influence in the Brisbane Lions win.

Copeland played 143 games for the Lions, usually as an automatic selection. However in September 2008 Copeland was delisted due to recurrent injuries and inconsistent performance. After being overlooked in the 2008 draft Copeland was chosen to be the inaugural captain for new first division QAFL club Aspley Hornets.

== Statistics ==
Legend
G	Goals	K	Kicks	D	Disposals	T	Tackles
B	Behinds	H	Handballs	M	Marks

Season	Team	No.	Games	Totals							Averages (per game)						
Season	Team	No.	Games	G	B	K	H	D	M	T	G	B	K	H	D	M	T
2001	Brisbane Lions	30	17	7	4	93	27	120	37	26	0.4	0.2	5.5	1.6	7.1	2.2	1.5
2002	Brisbane Lions	30	17	3	3	74	36	110	25	32	0.2	0.2	4.4	2.1	6.5	1.5	1.9
2003	Brisbane Lions	30	18	3	2	143	61	204	63	49	0.2	0.1	7.9	3.4	11.3	3.5	2.7
2004	Brisbane Lions	30	25	2	3	179	93	272	80	66	0.1	0.1	7.2	3.7	10.9	3.2	2.6
2005	Brisbane Lions	30	15	4	0	88	54	142	31	59	0.3	0.0	5.9	3.6	9.5	2.1	3.9
2006	Brisbane Lions	30	17	1	0	134	85	219	65	38	0.1	0.0	7.9	5.0	12.9	3.8	2.2
2007	Brisbane Lions	30	21	15	10	140	94	234	70	49	0.7	0.5	6.7	4.5	11.1	3.3	2.3
2008	Brisbane Lions	30	13	4	3	68	57	125	34	39	0.3	0.2	5.2	4.4	9.6	2.6	3.0
Career			143	39	25	919	507	1426	405	358	0.3	0.2	6.4	3.5	10.0	2.8	2.5

== Achievements ==
- Brisbane Lions Rising Star Nomination 2001
- Brisbane Lions Best First Year Player 2001
- Brisbane Lions Premiership Player 2001
- Brisbane Lions Premiership Player 2003
