= Marcus Ashcroft =

Australian rules footballer (born 1971)

Personal information
- Full name: Marcus Ashcroft
- Born: 25 September 1971 (age 55); Melbourne, Australia
- Original team: Southport Sharks/Surfers Paradise Demons
- Height: 184 cm (6 ft 0 in)
- Weight: 83 kg (183 lb)
- Position: Defender/Midfielder

Playing career^{1}
Years	Club	Games (Goals)
1989–1996	Brisbane Bears	152 (84)
1997–2003	Brisbane Lions	166 (61)
Total		318 (145)

Representative team honours
Years	Team	Games (Goals)
1991–1993	Queensland	2 (4)
1995–1998	Allies	4 (1)

International team honours
1999	Australia	2 (0)
- ^{1} Playing statistics correct to the end of 2003.

Career highlights
- 3× AFL Premiership player: 2001, 2002, 2003

Marcus Ashcroft (born 25 September 1971) is a former professional Australian rules footballer. He played 318 games for the Brisbane Bears and Brisbane Lions, winning three AFL premierships with the Lions in 2001, 2002 and 2003. The Marcus Ashcroft Medal, awarded to the player judged best on ground in the QClash football match played between the Brisbane Lions and Gold Coast Football Club, is named after him.

== Early life ==
Ashcroft was born in Melbourne and raised on the Gold Coast from age three. He attended Merrimac State High School throughout his teenage years.

Ashcroft began playing junior football on the Gold Coast for the Surfers Paradise Demons and later moved to the Southport Sharks to complete his junior football. In 1988 he made his senior QAFL debut for Southport as a 16-year-old. Later that year, Ashcroft would become the only Queenslander to be drafted in 1988 as the Brisbane Bears recruited the 17-year-old through their zone access.

== AFL career ==
Ashcroft was recruited to join the Brisbane Bears in 1988 when the club was in just its second season in the VFL and made his debut in Round 9 of the following year against North Melbourne at the MCG, collecting 8 disposals and taking 4 marks.

Ashcroft played over 150 consecutive games amongst his 318 career appearances (including 145 goals). He was at various points a key part of the leadership group although he never captained the club.

Ashcroft became the first Queenslander to play 300 AFL games in 2003, but his milestone match would not be remembered for the right reasons, as they suffered their first defeat of that season against the Sydney Swans at the Sydney Cricket Ground. He retired at the end of that season, winning his third straight AFL premiership medallion in the process.

== Post-playing career ==
=== Gold Coast Suns: 2008–2017 ===
Following the formation of the Gold Coast Suns in 2008, Ashcroft was appointed as an assistant coach and then promoted to football manager the following year. Ashcroft resigned from his position as football manager in October 2017.

=== Touch Football Australia ===
In March 2025, Ashcroft was appointed chief executive officer of Touch Football Australia.

== Statistics ==
Legend
G	Goals	K	Kicks	D	Disposals	T	Tackles
B	Behinds	H	Handballs	M	Marks

Season	Team	No.	Games	Totals							Averages (per game)						
Season	Team	No.	Games	G	B	K	H	D	M	T	G	B	K	H	D	M	T
1989	Brisbane Bears	43	10	5	2	67	34	101	22	10	0.5	0.2	6.7	3.4	10.1	2.2	1.0
1990	Brisbane Bears	10	13	11	7	116	103	219	38	23	0.8	0.5	8.9	7.9	16.8	2.9	1.8
1991	Brisbane Bears	10	22	2	11	291	173	464	94	42	0.1	0.5	13.2	7.9	21.1	4.3	1.9
1992	Brisbane Bears	10	17	22	19	203	108	311	67	36	1.3	1.1	11.9	6.4	18.3	3.9	2.1
1993	Brisbane Bears	10	20	14	11	260	169	429	79	40	0.7	0.6	13.0	8.5	21.5	4.0	2.0
1994	Brisbane Bears	10	22	10	10	270	174	444	58	50	0.5	0.5	12.3	7.9	20.2	2.6	2.3
1995	Brisbane Bears	10	23	10	13	234	169	403	78	43	0.4	0.6	10.2	7.3	17.5	3.4	1.9
1996	Brisbane Bears	10	25	10	11	305	170	475	78	43	0.4	0.4	12.2	6.8	19.0	3.1	1.7
1997	Brisbane Lions	10	23	18	15	293	185	478	92	53	0.8	0.7	12.7	8.0	20.8	4.0	2.3
1998	Brisbane Lions	10	22	7	15	300	201	501	84	41	0.3	0.7	13.6	9.1	22.8	3.8	1.9
1999	Brisbane Lions	10	25	16	8	357	218	575	92	61	0.6	0.3	14.3	8.7	23.0	3.7	2.4
2000	Brisbane Lions	10	21	14	11	227	146	373	81	40	0.7	0.5	10.8	7.0	17.8	3.9	1.9
2001	Brisbane Lions	10	25	5	2	222	203	425	103	45	0.2	0.1	8.9	8.1	17.0	4.1	1.8
2002	Brisbane Lions	10	25	1	2	232	148	380	120	34	0.0	0.1	9.3	5.9	15.2	4.8	1.4
2003	Brisbane Lions	10	25	0	1	155	115	270	68	33	0.0	0.0	6.2	4.6	10.8	2.7	1.3
Career			318	145	138	3532	2316	5848	1154	594	0.5	0.4	11.1	7.3	18.4	3.6	1.9

== Personal life ==
Ashcroft is the father of current Brisbane Lions players Will Ashcroft and Levi Ashcroft.

Marcus Ashcroft's uncle is former AFL player John Townsend.
