= Clark Keating =

Australian rules footballer, born 1976

Personal information
- Full name: Clark Anthony Keating
- Born: 19 March 1976 (age 50); Gold Coast, Queensland
- Original team: Surfers Paradise AFC
- Height: 197 cm (6 ft 6 in)
- Weight: 103 kg (227 lb)
- Position: Ruckman

Playing career^{1}
| Years | Club | Games (Goals) |
| 1996 | Brisbane Bears | 14 (9) |
| 1997–2006 | Brisbane Lions | 125 (74) |
| Total | | 139 (83) |
- ^{1} Playing statistics correct to the end of 2006.

Career highlights
- Brisbane Lions premiership player: 2001, 2002 & 2003; Brisbane Lions 2004 AFL Grand Final side

Clark Anthony Keating (born 19 March 1976) is a former Australian rules footballer in the Australian Football League.

Known as "Crackers" (after former VFL star Peter Keenan), Keating was selected by the Brisbane Bears as a local (along with Brent Green in 1992, playing for their under 19s).

In 1997 he was a member of the inaugural Brisbane Lions team following the Bears merger with Fitzroy.

Known by some as the "September Specialist", Keating's history of shoulder injuries sidelined him during the 2002 and 2003 seasons, but he went on and played magnificent finals series to taste premiership success with the Lions 3 times in a row. He had a superb performance in the ruck in the 2002 Grand Final with a career best 39 hitouts.

Keating is the brother of former Adelaide ruckman Aaron Keating who played just 6 games, including the 1997 premiership.

Keating attended The Southport School.

He retired and was delisted by the Lions at the end of 2006.

Despite not playing the required 150 games, Keating was awarded Brisbane Lions Life Membership for his contributions to the club. At end of the 2007 season, Brisbane Lions signed Clark Keating as a ruck coach due to Shaun Rehn leaving Brisbane. He joined fellow Brisbane premiership players Chris Johnson, Adrian Fletcher and Justin Leppitsch on the Brisbane coaching panel.

In October 2008, dual premiership ruckman Beau McDonald replaced former premiership team-mate Clark Keating as the Club's part-time ruck coach next season due to Keating's growing business interests.

== Statistics ==
Legend
| G | Goals | K | Kicks | D | Disposals | T | Tackles |
| B | Behinds | H | Handballs | M | Marks |

| Season | Team | No. | Games | Totals | | | | | | | Averages (per game) | | | | | | |
| Season | Team | No. | Games | G | B | K | H | D | M | T | G | B | K | H | D | M | T |
|---|---|---|---|---|---|---|---|---|---|---|---|---|---|---|---|---|---|
| 1996 | Brisbane Bears | 27 | 14 | 9 | 3 | 70 | 44 | 114 | 35 | 10 | 0.6 | 0.2 | 5.0 | 3.1 | 8.1 | 2.5 | 0.7 |
| 1997 | Brisbane Lions | 27 | 20 | 15 | 6 | 136 | 67 | 203 | 83 | 13 | 0.8 | 0.3 | 6.8 | 3.4 | 10.2 | 4.2 | 0.7 |
| 1998 | Brisbane Lions | 27 | 7 | 1 | 3 | 29 | 33 | 62 | 13 | 6 | 0.1 | 0.4 | 4.1 | 4.7 | 8.9 | 1.9 | 0.9 |
| 1999 | Brisbane Lions | 27 | 21 | 18 | 7 | 95 | 35 | 130 | 53 | 18 | 0.9 | 0.3 | 4.5 | 1.7 | 6.2 | 2.5 | 0.9 |
| 2000 | Brisbane Lions | 27 | 0 | — | — | — | — | — | — | — | — | — | — | — | — | — | — |
| 2001 | Brisbane Lions | 27 | 20 | 15 | 9 | 70 | 51 | 121 | 47 | 25 | 0.8 | 0.5 | 3.5 | 2.6 | 6.1 | 2.4 | 1.3 |
| 2002 | Brisbane Lions | 27 | 12 | 4 | 2 | 35 | 33 | 68 | 19 | 12 | 0.3 | 0.2 | 2.9 | 2.8 | 5.7 | 1.6 | 1.0 |
| 2003 | Brisbane Lions | 27 | 12 | 5 | 6 | 47 | 31 | 78 | 20 | 15 | 0.4 | 0.5 | 3.9 | 2.6 | 6.5 | 1.7 | 1.3 |
| 2004 | Brisbane Lions | 27 | 11 | 5 | 8 | 44 | 30 | 74 | 24 | 12 | 0.5 | 0.7 | 4.0 | 2.7 | 6.7 | 2.2 | 1.1 |
| 2005 | Brisbane Lions | 27 | 15 | 10 | 7 | 61 | 47 | 108 | 31 | 24 | 0.7 | 0.5 | 4.1 | 3.1 | 7.2 | 2.1 | 1.6 |
| 2006 | Brisbane Lions | 27 | 7 | 1 | 1 | 28 | 30 | 58 | 19 | 6 | 0.1 | 0.1 | 4.0 | 4.3 | 8.3 | 2.7 | 0.9 |
| Career | | | 139 | 83 | 52 | 615 | 401 | 1016 | 344 | 141 | 0.6 | 0.4 | 4.4 | 2.9 | 7.3 | 2.5 | 1.0 |
