= Jason Akermanis =

Australian rules footballer (born 1977)

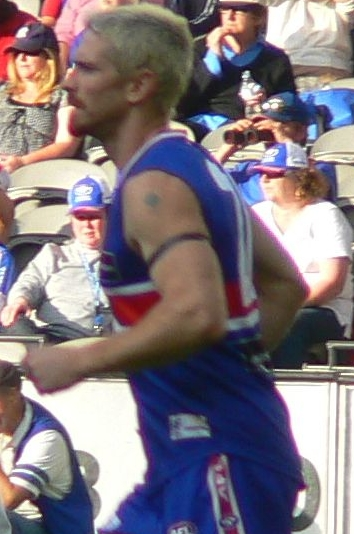
- Akermanis in 2007

Personal information
- Full name: Jason Dean Akermanis
- Nickname: Aker
- Born: 24 February 1977 (age 49); Mildura, Victoria, Australia
- Original teams: South Mildura, Sunraysia Football League
- Draft: NAT Zone Selection, 1994, Brisbane Bears
- Height: 177 cm (5 ft 10 in)
- Weight: 85 kg (187 lb)
- Position: Midfielder / Forward

Playing career^{1}
Years	Club	Games (Goals)
1995–1996	Brisbane Bears	38 (44)
1997–2006	Brisbane Lions	210 (263)
2007–2010	Western Bulldogs	77 (114)
Total		325 (421)

Representative team honours
Years	Team	Games (Goals)
1996–1998	The Allies	3 (0)

International team honours
1999–2000	Australia	4 (0)
- ^{1} Playing statistics correct to the end of 2010.

Career highlights
- 3× AFL premiership: 2001, 2002, 2003; Brownlow Medal: 2001; 4× All-Australian team: 1999, 2001-2002, 2004; 2× Merrett–Murray Medal: 1999, 2005; Brisbane Lions Leading Goal Kicker: 2004; Western Bulldogs Leading Goal Kicker: 2009; AFL Goal of the Year: 2002; Australian Football League Life Member: 2008; Australian Football Hall of Fame: Inducted 2015

Jason Dean Akermanis (born 24 February 1977) is a former professional Australian rules football player who played in the Australian Football League (AFL). He is a Brownlow Medallist and triple premiership player who played for the Brisbane Bears, Brisbane Lions and Western Bulldogs.

== Early life ==
Akermanis was born in Mildura, Victoria, to a Canadian father John Akermanis, and an Australian mother Shona Carswell, but moved to Brisbane at 9 years of age. Upon arriving in Queensland in 1986, Akermanis signed up to play for the Mayne under-10s side.

When he was 13, Akermanis discovered that he was not the son of his mother's former partner, John Akermanis. His biological father was Denis Dezdjek, a mechanic from Mildura with whom his mother had had an affair. He was educated at Wavell State High School then at St. Joseph's Nudgee College and played football with the Mayne Football Club in the QAFL where he was spotted by Brisbane Bears talent scouts. He completed year 12 at high school in 1995, during his first year with the Brisbane Bears.

== AFL career ==
=== Brisbane Bears (1995–1996) ===
Akermanis was a solid contributor to the Brisbane Bears midfield (wing), with his pace and skills evident even early in his career.

Akermanis made his debut in Round 4 of the 1995 AFL season, he had a solid debut, accumulating 19 disposals and kicking 1 goal in the Bears loss to Carlton. He played a total of 17 games in this debut season and kicking 12 goals.

The 1996 AFL season saw Akermanis play 21 games and kick 32 goals for the season, he doubled his disposal count from the previous season to finish with 328 total disposals for the season. His season was highlighted with a 19 disposal & 6 goal effort against the West Coast Eagles in Round 17.

=== Brisbane Lions (1997–2006) ===
It was after the Brisbane Lions formed that he began to shine, bulking up significantly, and a move to the forward line enabled him to make the most of his opportunities and develop a reputation as a goal sneak. Akermanis played 34 games across the 1997 and 1998 seasons and tallied 532 disposals and 32 goals.

1999 AFL season saw Akermanis have a breakout year, winning the Merrett–Murray Medal as Brisbane's Best & Fairest player for the season. Jason gathered 469 disposals and booted 16 goals for the season.

Akermanis became one of the Brisbane Lions' talented players. At the Lions he made his name as a fast midfielder or on-baller with acceleration and an ability to kick well with either foot, talents which helped him win the AFL's Brownlow Medal in 2001 in which he polled 23 votes to beat Adelaide's Andrew McLeod. He became the second Queenslander to win the Brownlow Medal after Michael Voss claimed the honour in 1996. The 2001 season saw Jason tally 510 disposals and kick 28 goals for the season, capping off the week/season, finishing as a premiership player.

The 2002 AFL season saw Akermanis impact the scoreboard by kicking 49 goals for the season, and becoming a premiership player again, as the Brisbane Lions defeated Collingwood in the decider. Akermanis played with a torn right adductor, in which he suffered early in the first quarter, this effected his ability to kick with his dominant right foot, resulting in Jason kicking on his left foot for the majority of the game, he eventually kicked a left foot snap over his shoulder late in the last quarter in which would be the sealer, guiding the Lions to victory.

Akermanis is also known for his goal-scoring abilities. He was a winner of the AFL Goal of the Year 2002 award and had an ability to kick goals from acute angles. In a match in 2005, he kicked two goals within minutes of each other from almost exactly the same spot: deep in the right forward pocket on the run. Early in the 2006 season, Akermanis was dropped from the Brisbane Lions side for Round 7, playing a game with the Suncoast Lions. This coincided with inflammatory comments that he made about the coach, Leigh Matthews, during the week, and there was speculation that his time at the club was up only a few months after he had won the 2005 club best and fairest award. However, Akermanis was soon recalled to the side and responded with 22 disposals across half-back in the game against Port Adelaide, and a post-match interview with Channel Nine showed him smiling and visibly happy with his performance. On 27 July 2006 it was reported that the coaching panel and senior playing group had voted unanimously (12–0) to not allow him back into the club.

=== Western Bulldogs (2007–2010) ===
On 6 September, it was reported that the Western Bulldogs were leading in the race to sign Akermanis for the 2007 season. On 15 September, Akermanis confirmed that he wanted to join the Bulldogs. It was then down to the Lions agreeing on the trade price, which they did on 9 October, when Brisbane Lions football manager Graeme Allan announced that the team had agreed to trade Akermanis to the Bulldogs.

At the end of the 2008 season, Akermanis made a statement that he would retire at the end of 2009 when his three-year contract expired, however he displayed excellent form at the start of the 2009 season, and later retracted his earlier comment about retirement. Western Bulldogs coach Rodney Eade said he had not ruled out the possibility of extending Akermanis's contract depending on his performance for the rest of the season. He then signed with the Bulldogs for another year, hoping to play in a fourth premiership side. It is assumed his contract would be for substantially less pay than his previous deal, which is estimated at between $350,000 and $400,000 a year.

In July 2010 it was announced that the Western Bulldogs had terminated Akermanis' contract due to the club's judgement that the two were on different paths. At the time of his sacking, he was one of only two former Brisbane Bears players left in the AFL, with the other being Daniel Bradshaw. He and Bradshaw were also the last remaining members of the Brisbane Lions inaugural 1997 list.

=== Post-AFL playing career ===
Akermanis began playing with the Glenorchy Football Club in the Tasmanian State League in 2011 as well as playing a number of one-off games at various country clubs. In 2013, he became captain-coach of the North Albury Football Club in the Ovens & Murray Football League.

=== Over-40 Men's International rules coaching appointment ===
Akermanis served as coach for the Australian Men's over-40s team in international rules football.

== Controversy ==
Akermanis threatened to switch codes to rugby union in 2002 if Brisbane signed former Kangaroos Football Club star Wayne Carey, and leaked to the media that teammate Nigel Lappin had broken his ribs during the 2003 preliminary final against Sydney.

In 2007, Akermanis wrote a column about performance-enhancing drugs and his views on their presence in sport, which included comments that he believed a specific opposing player, whom he did not name, had been using the drugs based on how strong a runner the player was for his size. The Seven Network and Fairfax Media inferred and named the player as the West Coast Eagles' Michael Braun, damaging Braun's reputation and subjecting him to an investigation by the Australian Sports Anti-Doping Authority, which cleared him of wrongdoing. Braun was ultimately awarded defamation damages against Seven and Fairfax, and received an apology from Akermanis, who conceded that he had been referring to Braun, and admitted that he had been wrong.

In a May 2010 column, he wrote about homosexuality in sports, and expressed an opinion that he believed homosexual players should stay in the closet, as he did not believe football culture was at that time ready to fully accept them. Numerous people spoke out against his column, and the Western Bulldogs, who were worried about the negative publicity, suspended him for two matches for not having the column approved by the club before having it published. Akermanis would later be dismissed by the Western Bulldogs two months later, partly related to leaking confidential team information to the media as part of a media career which the Bulldogs believed was taking an undue amount of his focus.

In a radio interview shortly after the death of former Melbourne Football Club player and president Jim Stynes in 2012, Akermanis commented that Stynes was "a nasty man in his day", was treated as a "demi-god", and questioned his deservedness to receive a state funeral just two days after Stynes' death.

In October 2014, Akermanis was suspended for four matches as head coach of the North Albury Football Club after being found guilty of breaching the AFL Victoria cyber-bullying policy in regards to several umpires' decisions during the 2014 Ovens & Murray Football League season.

By 2019, Akermanis had reportedly been banned by three golf clubs for alleged cheating incidents. Akermanis denied the clubs’ claims.

In October 2023, Akermanis was featured in the reality TV show SAS Australia. He left in the first episode due to what he claimed was a toe injury; however, medical personnel for the show disputed this claim.

In November 2023, while working as a real estate agent, it was reported that Akermanis disclosed sensitive personal information about a survivor of domestic abuse to a potential property buyer, among other ethical impropriety. Akermanis's ethical violation was reported by A Current Affair and print media.

== Personal life ==
Akermanis is married to Megan Legge, a speech pathologist. They have three daughters. Akermanis learned Auslan to communicate with his wife's hearing-impaired parents. He also speaks Spanish.

== Statistics ==
Legend
G	Goals	K	Kicks	D	Disposals	T	Tackles
B	Behinds	H	Handballs	M	Marks

Season	Team	No.	Games	Totals							Averages (per game)						
Season	Team	No.	Games	G	B	K	H	D	M	T	G	B	K	H	D	M	T
1995	Brisbane Bears	35	17	12	8	101	65	166	30	15	0.7	0.5	5.9	3.8	9.8	1.8	0.9
1996	Brisbane Bears	20	21	32	14	240	88	328	76	26	1.5	0.7	11.4	4.2	15.6	3.6	1.2
1997	Brisbane Lions	12	17	20	17	185	65	250	67	12	1.2	1.0	10.9	3.8	14.7	3.9	0.7
1998	Brisbane Lions	12	17	12	11	187	95	282	51	18	0.7	0.6	11.0	5.6	16.6	3.0	1.1
1999	Brisbane Lions	12	24	16	7	331	138	469	105	36	0.7	0.3	13.8	5.8	19.5	4.4	1.5
2000	Brisbane Lions	12	21	26	13	322	138	460	107	36	1.2	0.6	15.3	6.6	21.9	5.1	1.7
2001	Brisbane Lions	12	24	28	20	332	178	510	103	60	1.2	0.8	13.8	7.4	21.3	4.3	2.5
2002	Brisbane Lions	12	22	49	31	297	105	402	95	90	2.2	1.4	13.5	4.8	18.3	4.3	4.1
2003	Brisbane Lions	12	25	28	32	350	102	452	99	84	1.1	1.3	14.0	4.1	18.1	4.0	3.4
2004	Brisbane Lions	12	25	44	32	390	107	497	110	63	1.8	1.3	15.6	4.3	19.9	4.4	2.5
2005	Brisbane Lions	12	21	25	22	295	146	441	71	90	1.2	1.0	14.0	7.0	21.0	3.4	4.3
2006	Brisbane Lions	12	14	15	16	194	66	260	78	40	1.1	1.1	13.9	4.7	18.6	5.6	2.9
2007	Western Bulldogs	21	19	20	17	219	80	299	91	50	1.1	0.9	11.5	4.2	15.7	4.8	2.6
2008	Western Bulldogs	21	25	49	28	297	132	429	142	41	2.0	1.1	11.9	5.3	17.2	5.7	1.6
2009	Western Bulldogs	21	24	43	35	282	189	471	124	86	1.8	1.5	11.8	7.9	19.6	5.2	3.6
2010	Western Bulldogs	21	9	2	7	79	73	152	44	27	0.2	0.8	8.8	8.1	16.9	4.9	3.0
Career			325	421	310	4101	1767	5868	1393	774	1.3	1.0	12.6	5.4	18.1	4.3	2.4

== Honours and achievements ==
**Brownlow Medal votes**
Season	Votes
1995	—
1996	4
1997	1
1998	2
1999	13
2000	9
**2001**	**23**
2002	8
2003	5
2004	12
2005	11
2006	3
2007	1
2008	5
2009	10
2010	—
**Total**	**107**
Key:
Green / **Bold** = Won

- **Team**
  - AFL premiership (Brisbane): 2001, 2002, 2003
  - **NAB Cup** (Western Bulldogs): 2010
- **Individual**
  - Brownlow Medal: 2001
  - AFL Goal of the Year: 2002
  - Merrett–Murray Medal (Brisbane Lions Best & Fairest): 1999, 2005
  - All-Australian: 1999, 2001, 2002, 2004
  - Brisbane Lions Leading Goalkicker: 2004
  - Western Bulldogs Leading Goalkicker: 2009
