= List of Brisbane Lions captains =

This is a list of all captains of the Brisbane Lions, an Australian rules football club with teams in the Australian Football League and AFL Women's.

== AFL ==
Table of AFL captains
Captain/s	Image/s	Season/s	Achievements	Ref.			
Captain/s	Image/s	Season/s	Achievements	Ref.	Alastair Lynch Michael Voss	Colour photograph of Alastair Lynch in 2018 Colour photograph of Michael Voss in 2008	1997–2000
Michael Voss	Colour photograph of Michael Voss in 2008	2001–2006	3× AFL premiership captain: 2001, 2002, 2003; 4× AFLPA best captain: 2001, 2002, 2003, 2004; 2× All-Australian captain: 2002, 2003				
Simon Black Jonathan Brown Chris Johnson Nigel Lappin Luke Power	Colour photograph of Simon Black in 2008 Colour photograph of Jonathan Brown in 2012 Colour photograph of Chris Johnson Placeholder imagr Colour photograph of Luke Power in 2008	2007	Brown: AFLPA best captain: 2007; All-Australian vice-captain: 2007				
Simon Black Jonathan Brown Nigel Lappin Luke Power	Colour photograph of Simon Black in 2008 Colour photograph of Jonathan Brown in 2012 Placeholder imagr Colour photograph of Luke Power in 2008	2008					
Jonathan Brown	Colour photograph of Jonathan Brown in 2012	2009–2012	AFLPA best captain: 2009				
Jed Adcock Jonathan Brown	Colour photograph of Jed Adcock in 2016 Colour photograph of Jonathan Brown in 2012	2013					
Jed Adcock	Colour photograph of Jed Adcock in 2016	2014					
Tom Rockliff	Colour photograph of Tom Rockliff in 2008	2015–2016					
Dayne Beams	Colour photograph of Dayne Beams in 2018	2017–2018					
Dayne Zorko	Colour photograph of Dayne Zorko in 2018	2018–2022					
Harris Andrews Lachie Neale	Colour photograph of Harris Andrews in 2018 Colour photograph of Lachie Neale in 2020	2023–2025	2× AFL premiership captains: 2024, 2025				
Harris Andrews Josh Dunkley Hugh McCluggage	Colour photograph of Harris Andrews in 2018 Colour photograph of Josh Dunkley in 2025 Colour photograph of Hugh McCluggage in 2025	2026–	AFL premiership captains: 2026				

== AFL Women's ==
Table of AFL Women's captains
Captain	Image	Season(s)	Achievements	Ref.
Emma Zielke	Colour photograph of Emma Zielke in 2017	2017–2018		
Leah Kaslar	Colour photograph of Leah Kaslar in 2017	2019		
Emma Zielke	Colour photograph of Emma Zielke in 2017	2020–2021	AFLW premiership captain: 2021	
Breanna Koenen	Colour photograph of Breanna Koenen in 2022	2022 (S6)–present	AFLW premiership captain: 2023	
