= Martin Pike (Australian footballer) =

Australian rules footballer, born 1972

Personal information
- Full name: Martin Pike
- Born: 14 November 1972 (age 53); Glenelg, South Australia
- Original team: Norwood (SANFL)
- Draft: No. 9, 1992 national draft No. 42, 1996 national draft No. 33, 2000 national draft
- Height: 189 cm (6 ft 2 in)
- Weight: 92 kg (203 lb)

Playing career^{1}
Years	Club	Games (Goals)
1993–1994	Melbourne	24 (25)
1995–1996	Fitzroy	36 (15)
1997–2000	North Melbourne	81 (19)
2001–2005	Brisbane Lions	106 (67)
Total		247 (126)
- ^{1} Playing statistics correct to the end of 2005.

Career highlights
- 4× AFL premierships: 1999, 2001, 2002, 2003; Mitchell Medal: 1996

Martin Pike (born 14 November 1972) is a former professional Australian rules footballer, who played in four Australian Football League (AFL) premiership sides. A tough, versatile wingman, Pike has been described as a "natural player" of the game. Highlights of his career included a premiership with the North Melbourne Football Club, three more with Brisbane, the final AFL best-and-fairest winner with Fitzroy in 1996, and selection in the 1998 South Australian State-Of-Origin side.

== Early career ==
Pike was born in Glenelg, South Australia, and made his senior debut with South Australian National Football League (SANFL) side Norwood in 1990. He was drafted by Melbourne Football Club with their first choice (ninth overall) in the 1992 AFL draft. Pike made his AFL debut in 1993, playing eight games at centre half-back and a further 16 matches in 1994, including three finals.

Despite his strong on-field performance, Melbourne traded Pike to Fitzroy Football Club at the end of 1994 due to his off-field problems with alcohol.

After playing 14 games for Fitzroy in 1995, Pike played all 22 games in 1996, winning Fitzroy's best-and-fairest award, beating later Port Adelaide captain Matthew Primus for the honour. However, in late 1996, via a deal with the administrator of the Fitzroy Football Club at the time, the Brisbane Bears took over Fitzroy's AFL operations. Pike was not selected as one of the eight Fitzroy players to move north to Brisbane at the end of 1996, largely due to his poor off-field reputation. In July 1996 he was found guilty of drink driving for the third time and was fined $1000, lost his licence for five years and sentenced to six months jail, but avoided having to go to jail, being able to serve the sentence at home under an intensive correction order.

== North Melbourne 1997–2000 ==
Hoping in part to capitalise in part on the bad feeling many Victorian based Fitzroy supporters had about the failed merger with the North Melbourne Football Club, and about the way the deal with Bears was executed, the 1996 Premiers, North Melbourne, recruited a number of former Fitzroy players, including Pike, in the 1996 AFL draft.

Pike had a solid year in 1997: North finished third and South Australia included him in their 1998 State of Origin squad. His work off the halfback line and on the wings generated many opportunities for the team's forwards. Pike was a member of the North Melbourne Grand Final team that lost to Adelaide Football Club in 1998 after winning the minor premiership that year before becoming a member of the Kangaroos' premiership winning team in 1999, fulfilling a lifelong ambition.

However, due to poor form in 2000, combined with discipline issues off the field (including a widely reported late arrival to a compulsory club function), North Melbourne delisted him at the end of 2000.

== Brisbane Lions 2001–2005 ==
The Brisbane Lions recruited Pike in the 2000 AFL draft after impressing coach Leigh Matthews in an interview, although Pike's reputation was poor enough for Matthews to consult his leading players before committing to the wayward footballer. Pike quickly proved himself at his fourth club, playing 22 games in 2001 as the club won its first premiership. Now with family commitments, Pike was a reformed character, with increased professionalism and none of the poor off-field behaviour that had marred his career at his previous clubs.

In 2002, Brisbane won their second successive premiership with Pike playing a wide variety of roles. He again played a key role in many of the games won in 2003, including kicking three goals in the final quarter of the preliminary final against the Sydney Swans to get the team into its third successive winning grand final.

The Lions reached their fourth successive grand final in 2004 but lost to Port Adelaide Football Club in the grand final. Pike was disappointed with his performance in that match, and was reportedly involved in an altercation with a club official in the early hours of the morning on return to Brisbane, the only display of the behaviour which caused him problems before signing with the Lions. Despite resulting speculation that his contract would not be renewed he accepted a one-year contract for 2005. However, Pike's season was heavily disrupted by injury and he was unable to add more than a handful of games to his career tally before announcing his retirement on 2 August 2005 with four matches remaining in the regular season.

== Statistics ==
Legend
G	Goals	K	Kicks	D	Disposals	T	Tackles
B	Behinds	H	Handballs	M	Marks

Season	Team	No.	Games	Totals							Averages (per game)						
Season	Team	No.	Games	G	B	K	H	D	M	T	G	B	K	H	D	M	T
1993	Melbourne	22	8	0	1	58	40	98	17	5	0.0	0.1	7.3	5.0	12.3	2.1	0.6
1994	Melbourne	10	16	25	16	102	39	141	49	14	1.6	1.0	6.4	2.4	8.8	3.1	0.9
1995	Fitzroy	8	14	10	16	130	85	215	53	17	0.7	1.1	9.3	6.1	15.4	3.8	1.2
1996	Fitzroy	8	22	5	9	359	125	484	99	40	0.2	0.4	16.3	5.7	22.0	4.5	1.8
1997	North Melbourne	13	24	6	3	236	104	340	65	38	0.3	0.1	9.8	4.3	14.2	2.7	1.6
1998	North Melbourne	13	19	7	7	172	85	257	44	35	0.4	0.4	9.1	4.5	13.5	2.3	1.8
1999	North Melbourne	13	18	0	2	150	74	224	46	30	0.0	0.1	8.3	4.1	12.4	2.6	1.7
2000	North Melbourne	13	20	6	2	181	70	251	61	42	0.3	0.1	9.1	3.5	12.6	3.1	2.1
2001	Brisbane Lions	13	22	6	8	185	100	285	75	32	0.3	0.4	8.4	4.5	13.0	3.4	1.5
2002	Brisbane Lions	13	25	14	13	289	135	424	125	68	0.6	0.5	11.6	5.4	17.0	5.0	2.7
2003	Brisbane Lions	13	25	17	11	234	117	351	118	57	0.7	0.4	9.4	4.7	14.0	4.7	2.3
2004	Brisbane Lions	13	25	27	18	222	114	336	100	40	1.1	0.7	8.9	4.6	13.4	4.0	1.6
2005	Brisbane Lions	13	9	3	4	61	33	94	25	18	0.3	0.4	6.8	3.7	10.4	2.8	2.0
Career			247	126	110	2379	1121	3500	877	436	0.5	0.4	9.6	4.5	14.2	3.6	1.8

== After retirement ==
In February 2006, the Hastings Football Club in the rural Victorian Mornington Peninsula Nepean Football League announced that Pike had accepted an offer to coach the club for the upcoming season. He made an appearance in the 2006 AFL Legends Match. He continued as senior coach of the Hastings Football Club in 2007. He was the coach of VFL reserve side, Northern Bullants for the 2009 season. In 2010 Pike was appointed to the position of Senior Coach of the Power House Football Club in the Victorian Amateur Football Association.
