= Shaun Hart =

Australian rules footballer (born 1971)

Personal information
- Full name: Shaun Hart
- Born: 17 May 1971 (age 55); Ferntree Gully, Victoria
- Original teams: Shepparton United Football Club (Goulburn Valley Football Netball League)
- Draft: 33, 1989; Brisbane Bears
- Height: 175 cm (5 ft 9 in)
- Weight: 75 kg (165 lb)
- Position: Midfielder

Playing career^{1}
Years	Club	Games (Goals)
1990–1996	Brisbane Bears	102 (81)
1997–2004	Brisbane Lions	171 (96)
Total		273 (177)
- ^{1} Playing statistics correct to the end of 2004.

Career highlights
- 3× AFL Premiership player: (2001, 2002, 2003); Norm Smith Medal: (2001); Brisbane Bears reserves premiership: (1991)

Shaun Hart (born 17 May 1971) is a former Australian rules football player, who played for the Brisbane Bears and Brisbane Lions in the Australian Football League. Hart played in Brisbane's Lions hat trick of premierships from 2001 to 2003 as well as in the Bears reserves premiership in 1991. He is currently the director of coaching at Port Adelaide Power and has also been an assistant coach.

== Early life ==
He was born in Ferntree Gully, Victoria and moved to country Victoria, where he played for the Shepparton United Football Club.

Hart was recruited to the Brisbane Bears from Shepparton in the 1989 national VFL draft.

== AFL career ==
Shaun Hart played his first senior game in the first match of the 1990 season.

He initially struggled with the demands of professional football and played a great deal of football in reserve grade. This allowed him to gain a place in the Bears' only premiership side by being eligible to play in the 1991 reserve grade Grand Final.

In 1997 he was a member of the inaugural Brisbane Lions team following the Bears merger with Fitzroy.

In 2001 he was awarded his highest individual honour, the Norm Smith Medal, as best on ground in the Lions' first premiership win. He also went on to play important roles in the Lions successful campaigns in 2002 and 2003.

In the 2004 Preliminary Final, with the Lions poised to enter a playoff for a record-equalling fourth consecutive premiership, Hart was unlucky enough to find himself in the path of teammate Daniel Bradshaw on a lead. Bradshaw was unable to avoid a collision and Hart emerged with massive facial injuries. He was immediately taken to hospital, where shocked medical staff commented that his injuries were consistent with being in a car crash at speed without wearing a seat belt. As a consequence of consistent head injuries, for much of his career, he wore a soft helmet.

Unable to take his place in the Lions side for the 2004 Grand Final, he was forced to watch from his hospital bed as his team failed to maintain a half-time lead over Port Adelaide due to injuries to key forwards Jonathan Brown and Alastair Lynch. He announced his retirement from football not long afterwards.

== Statistics ==
Legend
G	Goals	K	Kicks	D	Disposals	T	Tackles
B	Behinds	H	Handballs	M	Marks
#	Played in that season's premiership team

Season	Team	No.	Games	Totals							Averages (per game)							Votes
Season	Team	No.	Games	G	B	K	H	D	M	T	G	B	K	H	D	M	T	Votes
1990	Brisbane Bears	32	11	2	6	52	43	95	14	14	0.2	0.5	4.7	3.9	8.6	1.3	1.3	0
1991	Brisbane Bears	32	6	1	1	51	32	83	13	13	0.2	0.2	8.5	5.3	13.8	2.2	2.2	0
1992	Brisbane Bears	32	12	1	5	156	90	246	51	24	0.1	0.4	13.0	7.5	20.5	4.3	2.0	0
1993	Brisbane Bears	32	19	9	4	205	88	293	56	46	0.5	0.2	10.8	4.6	15.4	2.9	2.4	0
1994	Brisbane Bears	32	11	11	2	86	41	127	22	15	1.0	0.2	7.8	3.7	11.5	2.0	1.4	0
1995	Brisbane Bears	32	23	32	21	307	173	480	87	42	1.4	0.9	13.3	7.5	20.9	3.8	1.8	1
1996	Brisbane Bears	32	20	25	21	255	115	370	56	59	1.3	1.1	12.8	5.8	18.5	2.8	3.0	5
1997	Brisbane Lions	32	19	11	15	250	124	374	75	39	0.6	0.8	13.2	6.5	19.7	3.9	2.1	7
1998	Brisbane Lions	32	18	12	14	218	151	369	66	40	0.7	0.8	12.1	8.4	20.5	3.7	2.2	5
1999	Brisbane Lions	32	23	18	7	272	121	393	75	35	0.8	0.3	11.8	5.3	17.1	3.3	1.5	6
2000	Brisbane Lions	32	24	14	15	264	142	406	97	52	0.6	0.6	11.0	5.9	16.9	4.0	2.2	3
2001^{#}	Brisbane Lions	32	19	8	7	195	94	289	62	33	0.4	0.4	10.3	4.9	15.2	3.3	1.7	0
2002^{#}	Brisbane Lions	32	23	8	3	178	108	286	77	57	0.3	0.1	7.7	4.7	12.4	3.3	2.5	0
2003^{#}	Brisbane Lions	32	25	18	13	290	126	416	104	60	0.7	0.5	11.6	5.0	16.6	4.2	2.4	5
2004	Brisbane Lions	32	20	7	6	182	113	295	46	41	0.4	0.3	9.1	5.7	14.8	2.3	2.1	0
Career			273	177	140	2961	1561	4522	901	570	0.6	0.5	10.8	5.7	16.6	3.3	2.1	32

== Honours and achievements ==
Team:

- 3× AFL premiership player (Brisbane Lions): 2001, 2002, 2003
- AFL Reserves premiership player (Brisbane Bears): 1991

Individual:

- Norm Smith Medal: 2001
- State of Origin (Victoria): 1998
- Brisbane Lions Team of the Decade 1997–2006 – Rover
- Inaugural Brisbane Lions AFL team – Wing

== Post-playing career ==
Not long after retiring, Hart supported the newly formed, Christian-aligned Family First Party in 2004 federal election to the Australian House of Representatives. In 2007 he stood as a Family First candidate in Queensland for the Senate at the 2007 Australian federal election, although he was unsuccessful.

In 2008, Hart was appointed the senior coach of the Broadbeach football club in Queensland.

Hart held a number of coaching and development roles at the Gold Coast Football Club from 2009 until January 2014 and then joined Port Adelaide as Director of Coaching in January 2014.
