= Tristen Walker =

Australian rules footballer, born 1984

Personal information
- Born: 11 April 1984 (age 42); Western Australia
- Original team: Claremont (WAFL)
- Debut: Round 1, 28 March 2003, Collingwood vs. Richmond, at Melbourne Cricket Ground

Playing career^{1}
Years	Club	Games (Goals)
2003–2005	Collingwood	28 (8)
- ^{1} Playing statistics correct to the end of 2005.

Tristen Walker (born 11 April 1984) is a former Australian rules footballer in the Australian Football League.

From Claremont, Walker was picked up by Collingwood late in the 2001 National Draft. After playing his first season with Williamstown, he made his debut in 2003 in Round 1. Forced to play at fullback, due to the absence of Simon Prestigiacomo, he held superstar spearhead Matthew Richardson of Richmond to one goal and six behinds. He was dropped soon after, before impressing in the latter stages of the season, winning a reprieve for the 2003 Grand Final due to the suspension of key forward Anthony Rocca for striking Port Adelaide ruckman Brendan Lade late in the first quarter of Collingwood's stunning 44-point defeat of the Power in the Preliminary Final a week earlier, Walker bypassing the more experienced Jarrod Molloy and Steve McKee to gain selection. Having played in the Williamstown premiership side the week prior in the VFL, it appeared that Walker was on track to record two flags in as many weeks, though the Magpies ultimately fell to a heavy 50-point loss to the Brisbane Lions.

Walker was again unable to reach a consistent pattern of form throughout 2004 and 2005, though arguably his inability to nail down a place in the senior side could be partially attributed to his struggle to find a key position to call his own, be it at centre half forward, or centre half back. He was fortunate to remain on the list despite a sizeable cull at the end of the 2005 season, though his AFL career was terminated 12 months later, after failing to appear in the senior side in 2006, his final match arising in round 17 of the previous year against St Kilda under the Friday night lights of Telstra Dome.
