= Simon Black =

Australian rules footballer, born 1979

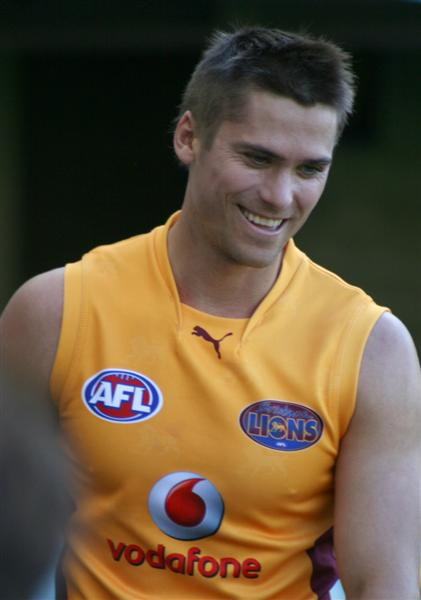
- Simon Black in 2008

Personal information
- Full name: Simon Black
- Born: 3 April 1979 (age 47); Mount Isa, Queensland
- Original team: East Fremantle (WAFL)
- Draft: No. 31, 1997 National Draft
- Height: 186 cm (6 ft 1 in)
- Weight: 81 kg (179 lb)
- Position: Midfielder

Playing career^{1}
Years	Club	Games (Goals)
1998–2013	Brisbane Lions	322 (171)

International team honours
Years	Team	Games (Goals)
2001	Australia	2 (0)
- ^{1} Playing statistics correct to the end of 2013.

Career highlights
- 3× AFL Premiership player: 2001, 2002, 2003; Brownlow Medal: 2002; Norm Smith Medal: 2003; 3× All-Australian team: 2001, 2002, 2004; 3× Merrett–Murray Medal: 2001, 2002, 2006; Herald Sun Player of the Year 2001; Brisbane Lions Captain: 2007–2008; Marcus Ashcroft Medal: 2011; AFL Rising Star nominee: 1999; Australian Football Hall of Fame: Inducted 2020; AFL Qld Hall of Fame: Inducted 2023; Brisbane Lions Hall of Fame: Inducted 2023

Simon Black (born 3 April 1979) is a former Australian rules football player, who played his whole career with the Brisbane Lions in the Australian Football League (AFL).

Black was a midfielder with a reputation for hard work and skill. He had the ability to get under the pack to retrieve the ball as well as deliver it with precision to teammates.

He was drafted by the Brisbane Lions in 1997 from the East Fremantle Football Club, and he debuted in the first game of the 1998 season and quickly became one of Brisbane's best players. He became Brisbane’s third Brownlow Medallist by winning the much-coveted award in 2002 by a four-vote margin. He also won the 2003 Norm Smith Medal and the 2001, 2002, and 2006 Merrett–Murray Medals awarded to the best and fairest player with the Brisbane Lions and three premiership medallions he received as a part of the Lions' hat-trick of premierships in 2001, 2002 and 2003. Black, along with Michael Voss (1996 Brownlow Medallist), Jason Akermanis (2001 Brownlow Medallist) and Nigel Lappin were collectively known as 'The Fab Four' and are widely considered to be one of the best midfield combinations in the history of the game.

== Background ==
Born in Mount Isa, Queensland, to Western Australian mother Fran and father Ray a dairy farmer of Kaitaia in New Zealand. He relocated to Western Australia with his family at a very young age, where he attended school at Corpus Christi College in Bateman and Aquinas College, Perth. Nurtured by his father, Black initially played rugby union with dreams of being an All Black thanks to his New Zealand heritage but later took up Australian rules. He was a standout junior 800m and 1500m runner as a junior. At age 15 he suffered a back injury that required him to not play football for 18 months. He joined East Fremantle Football Club and represented Western Australia in the 1997 edition of the AFL Under-18 Championships, where he earned All-Australian honours. He was a member of East Fremantle's losing 1997 WAFL Grand Final team. Black was drafted by the Brisbane Lions with the 31st selection in the 1997 National Draft.

== Playing career ==
=== Early career ===
Black was impressive during the 1998 pre-season and earned his senior debut in Round 1 against the Western Bulldogs at the Gabba. He played nine senior matches and averaged over 12 disposals during his debut season and took out the Club’s Best First Year Player award. In 1999, he consolidated himself as an automatic senior selection and built a reputation for winning the ball in contested situations. He collected 20 possessions and kicked two goals against Geelong in Round 9 which earned him an AFL Rising Star Nomination; he ultimately finished third in the award behind Sydney’s Adam Goodes and Adelaide’s Brett Burton. He played 22 matches for the season and averaged close to 19 disposals and won the Lions' Rookie of the Year award for the second consecutive season. In 2000, he averaged 23.9 disposals per game, led the competition in centre clearances on a per game basis and finished second behind Geelong’s Garry Hocking in hard-ball gets.

=== Premiership era ===
Black became one of the league's elite midfielders from 2001. Over the following four years, Black and the Lions contested four Grand Finals, winning the premiership in 2001, 2002 and 2003, and finishing runner-up in 2004. During that time, Black was part of a Brisbane midfield combination which is considered to be one of the best in the league's history: Black, Michael Voss, Jason Akermanis and Nigel Lappin, who became known collectively as the "Fab Four".

In 2001, Black played every match for the season, led the AFL in tackles and averaged a team-high 24.6 possessions. He was joint Club Champion with Captain Michael Voss, was named as the starting ruck-rover in the All-Australian team, finished 5th in the AFLPA's Most Valuable Player award, and won the Herald Sun Player of the Year award. He represented Australia for the first and only time of his career in the 2001 International Rules Series against Ireland.

In 2002, Black won the Brownlow Medal, polling 25 votes to beat second-placed Josh Francou by four votes, and comparisons were made between him and dual Brownlow Medallist Greg Williams because of his outstanding peripheral vision and ability to get the contested ball. He earned All-Australian selection and won the Merrett–Murray Medal for the second consecutive season. He was strong again in 2003, and won the Norm Smith Medal as best on ground in the Grand Final with a career-best 39 possessions, the most ever recorded by any player in a Grand Final – it remained the sole highest until it was eventually equalled by Christian Petracca's performance in 2021.

In 2004, Black became a vice-captain of the Lions, and he won All-Australian selection for the third time in his career. At the end of the season, Black had played a sequence of 107 consecutive matches for Brisbane, before a suspension in the violent 2004 AFL Grand Final ended the sequence.

=== Later career ===
Black's 2005 season was interrupted by injury, but in 2006 he played every match, and won the third Merrett–Murray Medal of his career. At the beginning of 2007, Black was named as one of the four Lions co-captains, replacing the retiring captain Michael Voss. In 2007 and 2008, Black continued to be Brisbane's premier midfielder, and he finished second in the Brownlow Medal in both seasons. He earned Brisbane Lions Life Membership at the end of his tenth season of service. He was also the Courier Mail Player of the Year in 2008, and was runner-up in the 2008 Merrett–Murray medal.

In 2009, new coach Michael Voss named Jonathan Brown as the sole captain of the club, and Black remained in the leadership group. He had another consistent season in 2010, finishing second in the Merrett–Murray Medal. In 2012, Black played his 300th AFL game, becoming the first player in league history to win a Brownlow Medal, a Norm Smith Medal, a Premiership Medal and play 300 games.

In 2013, Black equalled Marcus Ashcroft's record for the most games played for the Brisbane Bears/Lions playing his 318th game. His final game was the round 21 match against Greater Western Sydney at the Gabba after which he was suspended for one match for striking Giants captain Callan Ward in the final quarter.

On 18 October 2013, Black announced his retirement from the AFL.

== Coaching career ==
Shortly after announcing his retirement from the AFL, Black signed on as an assistant coach at the Lions for two years. His main focus is coaching the team's forward line and attacking systems.

In 2016, Black founded the Simon Black Australian Rules Academy, a full time sport and educational program which provides pathways for students to pursue University and Fitness qualifications while training and playing AFL in an elite academy environment. He subsequently resigned from his role as a coach at the Brisbane Lions to focus on growing the Academy program.

Black was selected to present the premiership cup to Brisbane after they won the 2026 AFL Grand Final.

== Media career ==
In August 2019, Black joined 10 News First Queensland as an AFL analyst.

In 2019, Black competed in the fourth season of Australian Survivor. He was eliminated on Day 42 and finished in 7th place.

== Statistics ==
Legend
G	Goals	K	Kicks	D	Disposals	T	Tackles
B	Behinds	H	Handballs	M	Marks
#	Played in that season's premiership team	†	Led the league for the season	±	Won that season's Brownlow Medal

Season	Team	No.	Games	Totals							Averages (per game)							Votes
Season	Team	No.	Games	G	B	K	H	D	M	T	G	B	K	H	D	M	T	Votes
1998	Brisbane Lions	20	9	2	5	73	37	110	28	11	0.2	0.6	8.1	4.1	12.2	3.1	1.2	0
1999	Brisbane Lions	20	22	19	14	260	156	416	70	60	0.9	0.6	11.8	7.1	18.9	3.2	2.7	9
2000	Brisbane Lions	20	19	16	12	273	181	454	61	62	0.8	0.6	14.4	9.5	23.9	3.2	3.3	4
2001^{#}	Brisbane Lions	20	25	23	17	308	314^{†}	622^{†}	79	119^{†}	0.9	0.7	12.3	12.6	24.9	3.2	4.8	12
2002^{#}	Brisbane Lions	20	25	17	18	288	294^{†}	582^{†}	84	115^{†}	0.7	0.7	11.5	11.8	23.3	3.4	4.6	25
2003^{#}	Brisbane Lions	20	26	16	14	326	308	634	73	113	0.6	0.5	12.5	11.8	24.4	2.8	4.3	12
2004	Brisbane Lions	20	25	13	11	284	307	591	57	97	0.5	0.4	11.4	12.3	23.6	2.3	3.9	18
2005	Brisbane Lions	20	18	10	8	213	183	396	50	48	0.6	0.4	11.8	10.2	22.0	2.8	2.7	6
2006	Brisbane Lions	20	22	8	4	257	273	530	63	108	0.4	0.2	11.7	12.4	24.1	2.9	4.9	11
2007	Brisbane Lions	20	21	9	11	244	222	466	45	91	0.4	0.5	11.6	10.6	22.2	2.1	4.3	22
2008	Brisbane Lions	20	21	10	9	253	286	539	61	87	0.5	0.4	12.0	13.6	25.7	2.9	4.1	23
2009	Brisbane Lions	20	23	10	7	256	328	584	65	112	0.4	0.3	11.1	14.3	25.4	2.8	4.9	19
2010	Brisbane Lions	20	18	6	4	222	238	460	74	69	0.3	0.2	12.3	13.2	25.6	4.1	3.8	3
2011	Brisbane Lions	20	22	4	9	285	305	590	62	95	0.2	0.4	13.0	13.9	26.8	2.8	4.3	9
2012	Brisbane Lions	20	18	5	6	180	247	427	48	67	0.3	0.3	10.0	13.7	23.7	2.7	3.7	6
2013	Brisbane Lions	20	8	3	5	77	102	179	17	29	0.4	0.6	9.6	12.8	22.4	2.1	3.6	5
Career			322	171	154	3799	3781	7580	937	1283	0.5	0.5	11.8	11.7	23.5	2.9	4.0	184

== Honours and achievements ==
- Team
  - 3× AFL Premiership (Brisbane): 2001, 2002, 2003
- Individual
  - AFL Qld Hall of Fame Inductee: 2023
  - Australian Football Hall of Fame Inductee: 2020
  - Brownlow Medal: 2002
  - 3× Merrett–Murray Medal (Brisbane Best & Fairest): 2001, 2002, 2006
  - King of the Pride: 2007 – 2016
  - 3× All-Australian: 2001, 2002, 2004
  - Norm Smith Medal: 2003
  - Australian Representative Honours in International Rules Football: 2001
  - Marcus Ashcroft Medal: 2011 (Round 21)
  - Brisbane Lions Captain: 2007–2008
  - AFL Rising Star Nominee: 1999 (Round 9)

In June 2019, it was announced that Black had been voted into the Australian Football Hall of Fame for the class of 2018, but due to his commitments to filming Australian Survivor he was unable to attend the induction ceremony. He was officially inducted in 2020.
