= Nigel Lappin =

Australian rules footballer, born 1976

Personal information
- Full name: Nigel Lappin
- Born: 21 June 1976 (age 50); Corowa, New South Wales
- Original team: Chiltern (O&KFL)
- Draft: No. 2, 1993 National Draft, Brisbane Bears
- Height: 188 cm (6 ft 2 in)
- Weight: 87 kg (192 lb)

Playing career^{1}
Years	Club	Games (Goals)
1994–1996	Brisbane Bears	61 (40)
1997–2008	Brisbane Lions	218 (134)
Total		279 (174)

Representative team honours
Years	Team	Games (Goals)
- Victoria

International team honours
2001	Australia	2
- ^{1} Playing statistics correct to the end of 2008.

Career highlights
- Brisbane Lions premiership player 2001, 2002, 2003; Merrett–Murray Medal 2004; 4× All-Australian team 2001, 2002, 2003, 2004; Brisbane Lions captain 2007–2008; Australian Football Hall of Fame member

Nigel Lappin (born 21 June 1976) is a former professional Australian rules footballer. Lappin is currently serving as an assistant coach with the Geelong Football Club.

== Playing career ==
Lappin was born in the locally based regional hospital at Corowa, New South Wales and grew up in Chiltern, Victoria. Lappin played in Chiltern's losing 1992 and 1993 O&KFL grand final sides, alongside his cousin, Matthew Lappin and Nigel kicked 59 goals in his two years of senior O&KFL football. Lappin won Chiltern's senior football best and fairest award in 1993.

He was drafted to play for the Brisbane Bears in the Australian Football League in 1993, playing his first AFL game the following year in round three, against Fitzroy on the 9th April, 1994. In 1997 he was a member of the inaugural Brisbane Lions team following the Bears merger with Fitzroy.

A long, accurate kick, capable of running as a play maker throughout the whole match, he was recognised as a member of the group of players known as the "Fab Four", a group of highly skilled midfield players considered to be one of the major driving forces behind the Lions successive Australian Football League premierships in 2001, 2002 and 2003. An example of his courage was the 2003 Grand Final win, in which he played the whole match with a broken rib.

Lappin represented Australia in International Rules in 2001.

In 2004 he achieved a personal milestone in winning his first Merrett–Murray Medal. However his 2005 season ended prematurely when he broke his right ankle late in the season. Weeks into his comeback, the ankle was re-injured in a 2006 pre-season practice match, forcing him to miss the entire 2006 season.

Following the retirement of longtime captain Michael Voss at the end of 2006, Lappin was appointed co-captain of the club alongside Simon Black, Luke Power, Jonathan Brown, and Chris Johnson on 20 March 2007.

His grandfather, Gerry O'Neill played with Footscray in 1943 and 1944. His cousin Matthew Lappin also played AFL football for Carlton and St. Kilda. His daughter, Meg Lappin, plays in the AFLW for the Brisbane Lions and his second cousin, Sunny Lappin, plays for the Gold Coast Suns.

== Retirement ==
On 19 August 2008, Nigel Lappin announced his retirement from professional football. After only being able to play 4 games in the 2008 season due to an Achilles tendon problem, Nigel decided it was time to draw a close on his career. "I'm really disappointed this season hasn't worked out for me," Lappin said at a Gabba press conference. "Every footballer wants the fairytale ending. It's hard to walk away from something that's been a really big part of your life, but I've got a family that will care for me." He was the last remaining member of the Brisbane Lions inaugural Round 1, 1997 team.

In October 2008, Lappin joined the Geelong Football Club as an assistant coach. In 2016 he was inducted into the Australian Football Hall of Fame.

== Statistics ==
Legend
G	Goals	K	Kicks	D	Disposals	T	Tackles
B	Behinds	H	Handballs	M	Marks

Season	Team	No.	Games	Totals							Averages (per game)						
Season	Team	No.	Games	G	B	K	H	D	M	T	G	B	K	H	D	M	T
1994	Brisbane Bears	44	17	8	3	115	82	197	37	11	0.5	0.2	6.8	4.8	11.6	2.2	0.6
1995	Brisbane Bears	44	19	17	18	179	80	259	56	14	0.9	0.9	9.4	4.2	13.6	2.9	0.7
1996	Brisbane Bears	44	25	15	15	376	126	502	118	16	0.6	0.6	15.0	5.0	20.1	4.7	0.6
1997	Brisbane Lions	44	21	10	14	281	119	400	107	17	0.5	0.7	13.4	5.7	19.0	5.1	0.8
1998	Brisbane Lions	44	20	15	12	269	130	399	96	15	0.8	0.6	13.5	6.5	20.0	4.8	0.8
1999	Brisbane Lions	44	25	23	23	281	185	466	109	29	0.9	0.9	11.2	7.4	18.6	4.4	1.2
2000	Brisbane Lions	44	24	16	12	337	179	516	107	33	0.7	0.5	14.0	7.5	21.5	4.5	1.4
2001	Brisbane Lions	44	25	26	19	383	232	615	157	50	1.0	0.8	15.3	9.3	24.6	6.3	2.0
2002	Brisbane Lions	44	18	7	12	275	167	442	92	74	0.4	0.7	15.3	9.3	24.6	5.1	4.1
2003	Brisbane Lions	44	22	8	15	371	191	562	124	70	0.4	0.7	16.9	8.7	25.5	5.6	3.2
2004	Brisbane Lions	44	25	17	17	379	251	630	115	121	0.7	0.7	15.2	10.0	25.2	4.6	4.8
2005	Brisbane Lions	44	16	8	5	220	147	367	76	49	0.5	0.3	13.8	9.2	22.9	4.8	3.1
2006	Brisbane Lions	44	0	—	—	—	—	—	—	—	—	—	—	—	—	—	—
2007	Brisbane Lions	44	18	4	6	257	225	482	85	75	0.2	0.3	14.3	12.5	26.8	4.7	4.2
2008	Brisbane Lions	44	4	0	2	35	39	74	14	22	0.0	0.5	8.8	9.8	18.5	3.5	5.5
Career			279	174	173	3758	2153	5911	1293	596	0.6	0.6	13.5	7.7	21.2	4.6	2.1

== Career highlights ==
Teal Cup

- Victorian & All-Australian U15 Schoolboys 1991
- Victorian Country & All-Australian Teal Cup (U17) 1993
- Winner Chiltern Best & Fairest 1993

Brisbane Bears/Lions

- Best & Fairest 2004
- Victorian State of Origin 1996, 1997, 1999
- First Brisbane-based AFL player to win Victorian State of Origin Selection
- Member Bears First Finals Side 1995
- Member Lions First Finals Side 1997
- Ansett Cup Grand Final Side 2001
- Brisbane Lions captain 2007
- Australian Asthma Sportsman of the Year 1998
- All-Australian 2001, 2002, 2003, 2004
- International Rules 2001,
- Premiership Player 2001, 2002, 2003
