= 2001 AFL Grand Final =

Grand final of the 2001 Australian Football League season

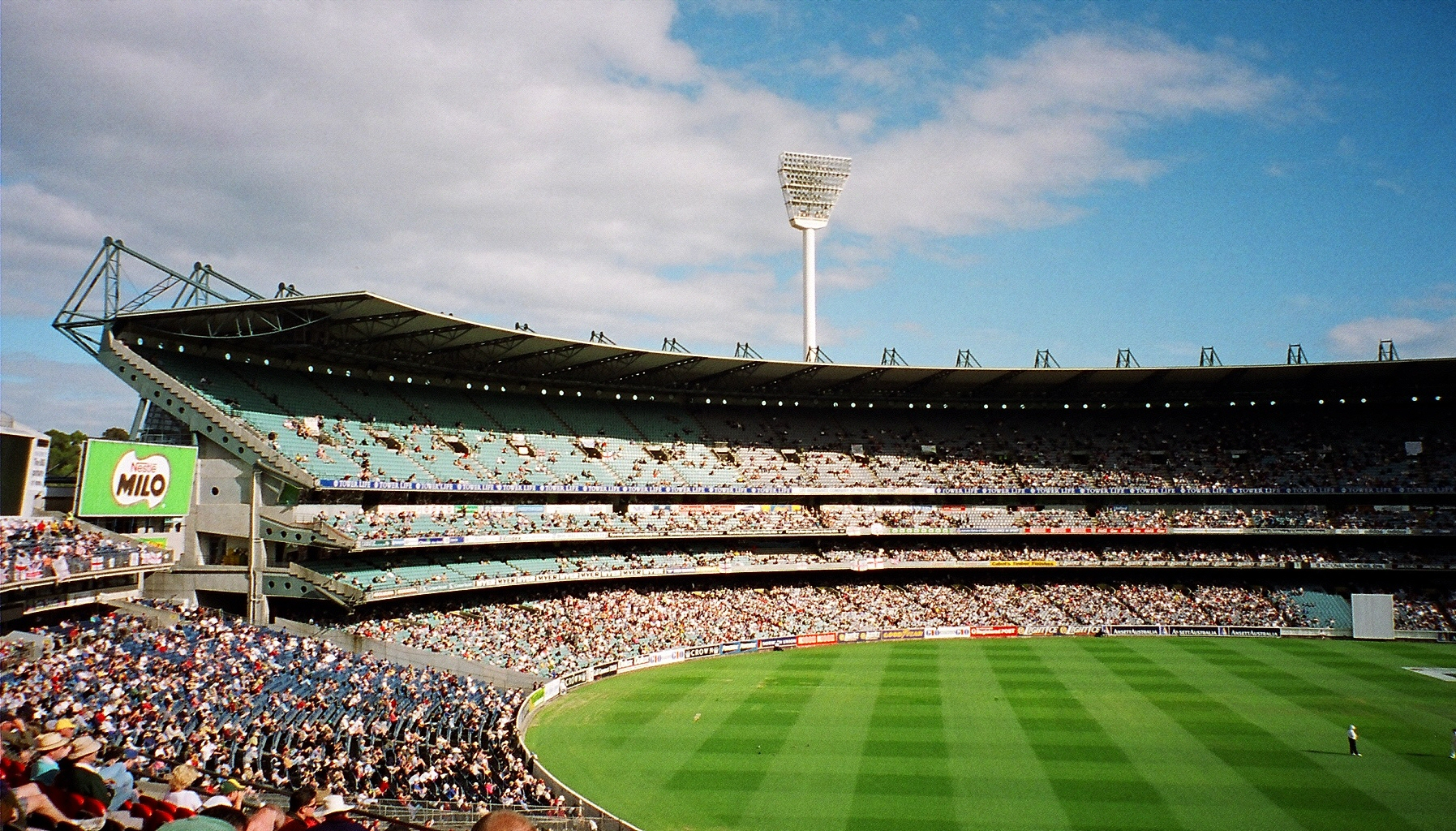
- The Melbourne Cricket Ground, where the 2001 AFL Grand Final took place.

Essendon	Brisbane Lions
12.10 (82)	15.18 (108)
	1	2	3	4
ESS	3.2 (20)	8.6 (54)	9.8 (62)	12.10 (82)
BL	3.7 (25)	5.10 (40)	11.12 (78)	15.18 (108)
- Date: 29 September 2001
- Stadium: Melbourne Cricket Ground
- Attendance: 91,482
- Favourite: Essendon
- Umpires: Matthew James, Scott McLaren, Martin Ellis

Ceremonies
- Pre-match entertainment: Vanessa Amorosi, Men At Work, INXS
- National anthem: Julie Anthony

Accolades
- Norm Smith Medallist: Shaun Hart (Brisbane Lions)
- Jock McHale Medallist: Leigh Matthews

Broadcast in Australia
- Network: Seven Network
- Commentators: Bruce McAvaney (host and commentator); Sandy Roberts (commentator); Jason Dunstall (expert commentator); Gerard Healy (expert commentator); Robert DiPierdomenico (boundary rider); Matthew Campbell (boundary rider)

The 2001 AFL Grand Final was an Australian rules football game contested between the Essendon Bombers and the Brisbane Lions, held at the Melbourne Cricket Ground in Melbourne on 29 September 2001. It was the 105th annual grand final of the Australian Football League (formerly the Victorian Football League), staged to determine the premiers for the 2001 AFL season. The match, attended by 91,482 spectators, was won by Brisbane by a margin of 26 points, marking the club's first premiership in their history since their inception in 1997.

== Background ==
Essendon were defending their 2000 premiership, and they went into the game having finished on top of the ladder on percentage ahead of second-placed Brisbane (both had won 17 games). Brisbane had won 15 consecutive games leading up to the grand final, a streak which commenced with a major upset of Essendon at the Gabba in Round 10. It was the Brisbane Lions' first appearance in a grand final, and it broke a long grand final drought for the two clubs who merged to form it in 1997: its Melbourne-based predecessor, Fitzroy Lions, had not contested a grand final since 1944, and its Brisbane-based predecessor, Brisbane Bears, did not contest a grand final in its ten-year history. Essendon were the dominant team between 1999 and 2001, losing just 11 games (including just one in 2000) from the start of 1999 until the 2001 grand final.

In the 2001 finals series, Essendon defeated Richmond by 70 points in the first qualifying final and then defeated Hawthorn by 9 points in the first preliminary final to advance to the grand final. Brisbane earned their place in the grand final by defeating Port Adelaide by 32 points in the second qualifying final and then Richmond by 68 points in the second preliminary final.

In the lead-up to the match, Brisbane's Jason Akermanis won the Brownlow Medal. The two coaches, Kevin Sheedy and Leigh Matthews, had met in a grand final 11 years prior, when Matthews' Magpies ended their so-called "Colliwobbles" (a drought lasting 32 years) by defeating Sheedy's Bombers in the 1990 AFL Grand Final.

This was the last AFL match to be televised by the Seven Network before it lost the broadcasting TV rights to the sport, having shown the game for the previous 45 years, with the exception of 1987, when the game was televised by the ABC and TV0 in Brisbane. It wasn't until 2007 that Seven would regain the rights, and it wasn't until 2008 that the AFL Grand Final would again be televised by the Seven Network.

== Match summary ==
Brisbane started the game well, scoring the first goal of the match from a free kick awarded to Alastair Lynch for holding against Dustin Fletcher. Essendon fought back late in the first quarter then took control of the game in the second term. Brisbane's poor kicking for goal almost put them out of the game in the second quarter as Essendon blew their lead out to 20 points late in the term. Brisbane had kicked an inaccurate 5.10 by the half-time break.

Brisbane managed to overrun Essendon in the third term, kicking six goals to one and turning a 14-point deficit into a 16-point lead. Brisbane's pace in the midfield and the tiring legs of most of the Essendon players played a pivotal role in Brisbane taking full control of the game in the second half to win comfortably. Essendon had scored two late goals in the last quarter after once trailing by as much as 39 points.

Shaun Hart of the Lions was awarded the Norm Smith Medal for being judged the best player. Matthew Lloyd was among the best for Essendon, kicking five goals.

Essendon captain James Hird was visibly shattered and disappointed in his post-match speech. A quick congratulations to Brisbane for winning was followed by a public apology to Bombers fans for letting them down.

In a remarkable statistic, most of the Lions' premiership side were on the playing list when the club won the wooden spoon in 1998.

This was the first of four consecutive grand final appearances by Brisbane, and the first of three consecutive flags. For Essendon, this is their most recent grand final appearance as of the completed 2025 season.

The lower than capacity attendance figure of 91,482 was blamed on MCC members not taking up their seats, with the AFL also pointing to the issues with airline partner Ansett Australia.

=== Norm Smith Medal ===
The Norm Smith Medal was awarded to Brisbane midfielder Shaun Hart. The voting panel for the award included Sunday Herald Sun reporter Damian Barrett, Seven Network's Robert DiPierdomenico, ABC Grandstand commentator Stan Alves, and Tony Morwood from 4AAA.

Leaderboard
Player	Team	Votes
Shaun Hart	Brisbane	9
Nigel Lappin	Brisbane	5
Jonathan Brown	Brisbane	3
Chris Johnson	Brisbane	3
Justin Leppitsch	Brisbane	2
Michael Voss	Brisbane	2

== Teams ==
Essendon	Brisbane Lions

Essendon
B:	42 Danny Jacobs	31 Dustin Fletcher	6 Sean Wellman
HB:	1 Mark Johnson	7 Dean Solomon	11 Damien Hardwick
C:	9 Adam Ramanauskas	26 Chris Heffernan	33 Blake Caracella
HF:	5 James Hird (c)	25 Scott Lucas	43 Dean Rioli
F:	29 Gary Moorcroft	18 Matthew Lloyd	27 Steven Alessio
Foll:	22 John Barnes	14 Jason Johnson	24 Joe Misiti
Int:	10 Mark McVeigh	32 Justin Blumfield	2 Mark Mercuri
Int:	16 Paul Barnard		
Coach:	Kevin Sheedy		

Brisbane Lions
B:	2 Chris Johnson	23 Justin Leppitsch	33 Darryl White
HB:	44 Nigel Lappin	22 Chris Scott	10 Marcus Ashcroft
C:	12 Jason Akermanis	3 Michael Voss (c)	30 Robert Copeland
HF:	32 Shaun Hart	16 Jonathan Brown	6 Luke Power
F:	36 Daniel Bradshaw	11 Alastair Lynch	13 Martin Pike
Foll:	27 Clark Keating	20 Simon Black	5 Brad Scott
Int:	43 Beau McDonald	4 Craig McRae	8 Tim Notting
Int:	15 Mal Michael		
Coach:	Leigh Matthews		

== Scorecard ==
Grand Final
Saturday, 29 September (2:30 pm)	Essendon	def. by	Brisbane Lions	MCG (crowd: 91,482)
3.2 (20); 8.6 (54); 9.8 (62); 12.10 (82)	Q1; Q2; Q3; Final	3.7 (25); 5.10 (40); 11.12 (78); 15.18 (108)	Umpires: James, McLaren, Ellis; Norm Smith Medal: Shaun Hart (Brisbane Lions); Television broadcast: Seven Network; National anthem: Julie Anthony
Lloyd 5, Lucas 4, Caracella, Johnson, Moorcroft	Goals	Power 3, Akermanis 2, Brown 2, Lappin 2, Lynch 2, Ashcroft, Notting, Pike, Voss
Lloyd, Lucas, J. Johnson	Best	Hart, Johnson, Voss, Lappin, Power
Nil	Injuries	Nil
Nil	Reports	Nil

Team stats	(B.L.)	(Ess)
Kicks	176	165
Marks	73	60
Handballs	78	90
Tackles	34	54
Hitouts	39	26
Frees	22	19

== Legacy ==
A number of participants from this Grand Final have gone on to coach at senior level in the AFL:

- Chris Scott, Geelong (2011–present; 2011 and 2022 premiership coach) (Note: Scott and Hardwick coached against each other in the 2020 Grand Final, which, due to a COVID-19 outbreak in Victoria that prevented the match from being played at its contracted ground, the Melbourne Cricket Ground, was played at the Gabba.)
- Damien Hardwick, Richmond (2010–2023; 2017, 2019 and 2020 premiership coach), Gold Coast (2024–present)
- Craig McRae, Collingwood, (2022–present; 2023 premiership coach)
- Michael Voss, Brisbane Lions (2009–2013), Carlton (2022–2026)
- Brad Scott, North Melbourne (2010–2019), Essendon (2023–2026)
- James Hird, Essendon (2011–2013, 2015)
- Justin Leppitsch, Brisbane Lions (2014–2016) (Note: Following his stint as Brisbane Lions head coach, Leppitsch was an assistant coach under Hardwick when Richmond won the 2017, 2019 and 2020 premierships, and under McRae when Collingwood won the 2023 premiership.)

This was the first of six consecutive premierships to be won by non-Victorian clubs, during which one club from each of the other four major mainland states (Queensland, South Australia, New South Wales and Western Australia) won the premiership, with Brisbane winning again in 2002 and 2003, followed by Port Adelaide in 2004, Sydney in 2005 and West Coast in 2006.

== See also ==
- 2001 AFL season
