= 2009 Western Bulldogs season =

Western Bulldogs
2009 season
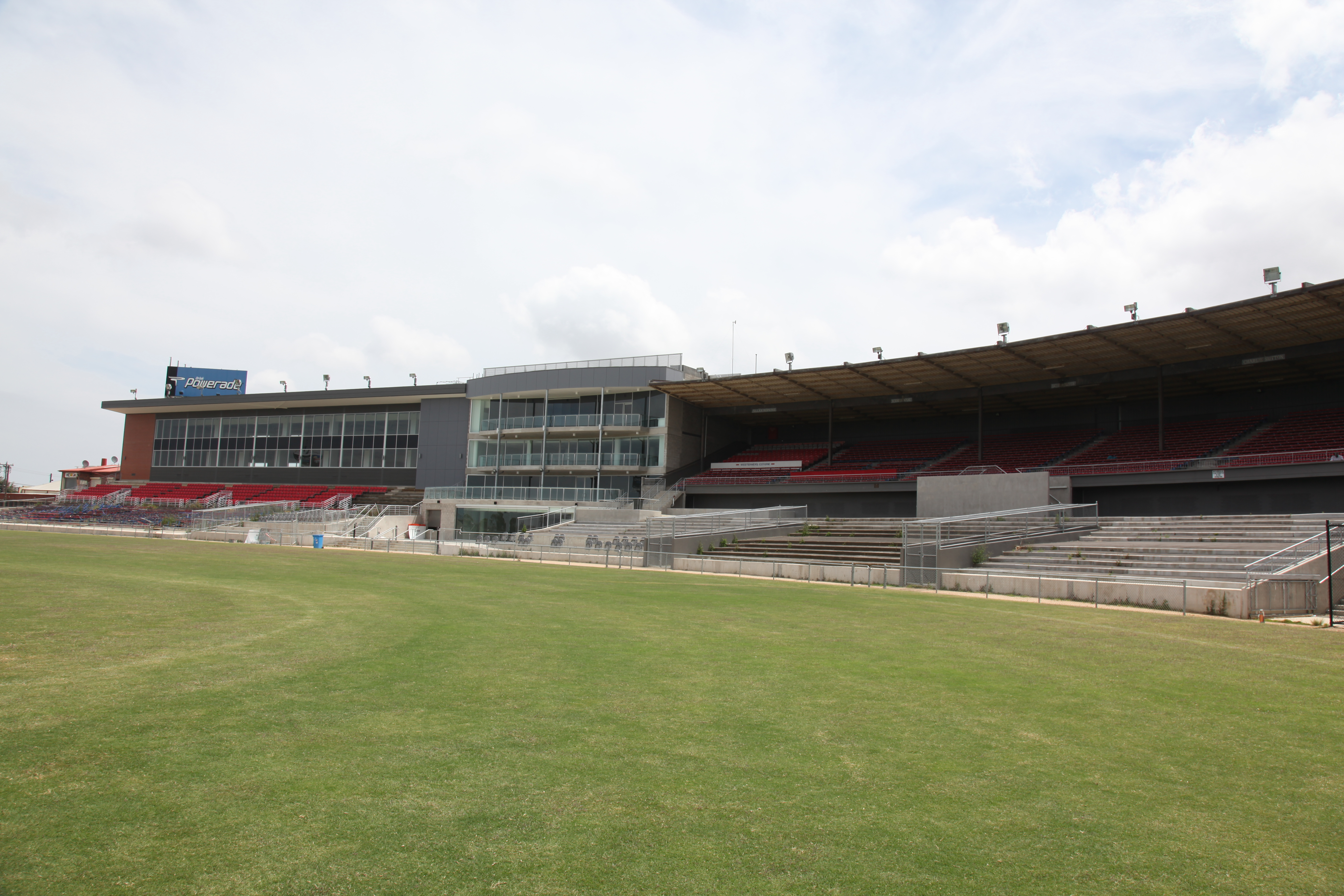
- President: David Smorgon
- Coach: Rodney Eade
- Captain: Brad Johnson
- Home ground: Etihad Stadium
- Pre-season competition: First round
- AFL season: 3rd
- Finals series: Preliminary finalist
- Best and Fairest: Matthew Boyd
- Leading goalkicker: Jason Akermanis (43)

The 2009 Western Bulldogs season was the club's 84th since their introduction to the AFL in 1925.

== Season summary ==
The Western Bulldogs were coming off their most successful season in 10 years by making the preliminary final in 2008 and finished 3rd overall in 2009.

The club's only first round pick in the 2009 AFL draft was at 15, and with it the Bulldogs selected Glenelg midfielder Christian Howard.

== Fixtures ==
The bulldogs made two trips to Western Australia in the first four rounds, and then played three games at the MCG. They went on to also play a home game in Canberra against Sydney and a home game in Darwin against Port Adelaide.

=== The NAB Cup ===
Round 1
13 February 2009
8:40pm Local

Western Bulldogs	1.8.12 (69) - 1.8.13 (70)	Essendon Football Club
Goals:		Goals:

Telstra Dome, Melbourne
Attendance: 35,123

ladder position = -

=== Regular season ===
Round 1
29 March 2009
6:10pm Local

Fremantle	13.16 (94) - 25.7 (157)	Western Bulldogs
Goals: Brett Peake 3, Michael Johnson 2, Stephen Hill, Rhys Palmer, Matthew Pavlich, Byron Schammer, Luke McPharlin, Ryan Murphy, Nic Suban		Goals: Mitch Hahn 5, Ryan Griffen 3, Lindsay Gilbee 3, Nathan Eagleton 3, Shaun Higgins 2, Jason Akermanis 2, Daniel Giansiracusa 2, Dylan Addison, Adam Cooney, Matthew Boyd, Daniel Cross, Callan Ward

Subiaco Oval, Perth
Attendance: 34,634

ladder position = 2

Round 2
5 April 2009
2:10pm Local

Western Bulldogs	11.14 (80) - 9.11 (65)	North Melbourne Football Club
Goals: Johnson 3, Hill 3, Giansiracusa, Minson, Addison, Griffen, Gilbee		Goals: Campbell 2, Thomas 2, Simpson, Wells, Swallow, Hale, McIntosh

MCG, Melbourne
Attendance: 34,466

ladder position = 2

Round 3
13 April 2009
2:10pm Local

Western Bulldogs	16.14 (110) - 8.15 (63)	Richmond Football Club
Goals: Akermanis 4, Higgins 2, Johnson 2, Giansiracusa 2, Gilbee, Hill, Hahn, Minson, Morris, Cooney		Goals: White 2, Foley, Riewoldt, Richardson, Brown, Morton, Tuck

Docklands Stadium, Melbourne
Attendance: 46,261

ladder position = 2

Round 4
19 April 2009
2:10pm Local

West Coast Eagles	17.14 (116) - 12.11 (83)	Western Bulldogs
Goals: Hunter, Lynch 3, LeCras, McKinley 2, Embley, Hansen, Kerr, Rosa, Selwood, Staker, Wirrpanda		Goals: Higgins 4, Boyd 2, Gilbee, Griffen, Hill, Johnson, Lake, Ward

Subiaco Oval, Perth
Attendance: 37,758

ladder position = 3

Round 5
26 April 2009
2:10pm Local

Western Bulldogs	13.12 (90) - 21.7 (133)	Carlton Football Club
Goals: Johnson 4, Giansiracusa 2, Boyd 2, Hill, Griffen, Picken, Higgins, Hahn		Goals: Fevola 3, Betts 3, Kreuzer 2, Simpson 2, Russell 2, Cloke 2, Houlihan 2, Waite, Murphy, O'hAilpin, Carrazzo, Gibbs

Docklands Stadium, Melbourne
Attendance: 44,268

ladder position = 5

Round 6
3 May 2009
2:10pm Local

Western Bulldogs	11.10 (76) - 14.20 (104)	St Kilda Football Club
Goals: Hill 3, Akermanis 2, Minson 2, Griffin, Gilbee, Higgins, Eagleton,		Goals: Riewodlt 4, Schneider 3, Goddard, Gardiner, Dal Santo, McQualter, Gram, Koschitzke, Gwilt

Docklands Stadium, Melbourne
Attendance: 36,302

ladder position = 6

Round 7
10 May 2009
01:10pm Local

Adelaide Football Club	12.14 (86) - 17.16 (118)	Western Bulldogs
Goals: Walker 4, Knights 3, Porplyzia 2, Goodwin, Tippett, Edwards		Goals: Murphy 4, Akermanis 3, Eagleton 2, Hill 2, Johnson, Gilbee, Cooney, Giansiracusa, Minson, Hahn

AAMI Stadium, Adelaide
Attendance: 31,742

ladder position = 3

Round 8
16 May 2009
02:10pm Local

Melbourne Football Club	15.7 (97) - 15.14 (104)	Western Bulldogs
Goals: Bate 4, Robertson 3, Maric 2, Jones, Davey, McLean, Sylvia, Valenti, Pettard		Goals: Akermanis 4, Welsh 3, Gilbee 2, Johnson, Murphy, Addison, Hahn, Cooney, Boyd

MCG, Melbourne
Attendance: 28,279

ladder position = 3

Round 9
22 May 2009
07:40pm Local

Geelong Football Club	17.14 (116) - 17.12 (114)	Western Bulldogs
Goals: Johnson 5, Stokes 4, Chapman 3, Selwood, Bartel, Varcoe, Gamble, Rooke,		Goals: Akermanis 4, Johnson 4, Griffin 2, Giansiracusa 2, Eagleton, Minson, Hill, Picken, Cooney

Docklands Stadium, Melbourne
Attendance: 44,620

ladder position = 3

Round 10
30 May 2009
02:10pm Local

Western Bulldogs	18.9 (117) - 12.5 (77)	Sydney Swans
Goals: Welsh 4, Giansiracusa 3, Hahn 3, Ward 3, Cooney 2, Harbrow, Higgins, Boyd		Goals: Hall 6, Goodes 2, Malceski, Ablett, Jack, J Bolton

Manuka Oval, Canberra
Attendance: 12,457

ladder position = 3

Round 11
5 June 2009
07:40pm Local

Richmond Football Club	14.5 (89) - 24.13 (157)	Western Bulldogs
Goals: Morton 3, Riewoldt 3, Pattison 2, Tuck 2, McMahon, Collins, Polo, Deledio		Goals: Hill 4, Higgins 3, Picken 2, Hahn 2, Giansiracusa 2, Johnson 2, Gilbee 2, Ward, Akermanis, Boyd, Hargrave, Griffen, Cooney, Eagleton

Docklands Stadium, Melbourne
Attendance: 36,483

ladder position = 3

Round 12
13 June 2009
06:40pm Local

Western Bulldogs	21.11 (137) - 7.2 (44)	Port Adelaide Football Club
Goals: Hill 3, Johnson 3, Minson 3, Giansiracusa 2, Hahn 2, Gilbee, Griffen, Picken, Akermanis, Boyd, Ward, Hudson, Higgins		Goals: Ebert 2, D. Motlop, Rodan, Tredrea, J. Westhoff, Cassisi

TIO Stadium, Darwin
Attendance: 12,457

ladder position = 3

Round 13
28 June 2009
02:10pm Local

North Melbourne Football Club	12.14 (86) - 17.6 (108)	Western Bulldogs
Goals: Petrie 3, Harding 3, Garlett, Swallow, Hansen, McIntosh, Jones, Hale		Goals: Giansiracusa 3, Welsh 2, Higgins 2, Akermanis 2, Hill 2, Eagleton 2, Ward, Gilbee, Hahn, Cross

MCG, Melbourne
Attendance: 31,470

ladder position = 3

Round 14
4 July 2009
7:10pm Local

Western Bulldogs	19.19 (133) - 6.9 (45)	Hawthorn Football Club
Goals: Johnson 3, Welsh 3, Higgins 3, Akermanis 2, Hill 2, Boyd 2, Gilbee, Hahn, Griffen, Minson		Goals: Lewis 3, Roughead 2, Ladson

Docklands Stadium, Melbourne
Attendance: 36,827

ladder position = 3

== Ladder ==
2009 AFL ladder
Pos	Team	Pld	W	L	D	PF	PA	PP	Pts	
1	St Kilda	22	20	2	0	2197	1411	155.7	80	Finals series
2	Geelong (P)	22	18	4	0	2312	1815	127.4	72	Finals series
3	Western Bulldogs	22	15	7	0	2378	1940	122.6	60	Finals series
4	Collingwood	22	15	7	0	2174	1778	122.3	60	Finals series
5	Adelaide	22	14	8	0	2104	1789	117.6	56	Finals series
6	Brisbane Lions	22	13	8	1	2017	1890	106.7	54	Finals series
7	Carlton	22	13	9	0	2270	2055	110.5	52	Finals series
8	Essendon	22	10	11	1	2080	2127	97.8	42	Finals series
9	Hawthorn	22	9	13	0	1962	2120	92.5	36	
10	Port Adelaide	22	9	13	0	1990	2244	88.7	36	
11	West Coast	22	8	14	0	1893	2029	93.3	32	
12	Sydney	22	8	14	0	1888	2027	93.1	32	
13	North Melbourne	22	7	14	1	1680	2015	83.4	30	
14	Fremantle	22	6	16	0	1747	2259	77.3	24	
15	Richmond	22	5	16	1	1774	2388	74.3	22	
16	Melbourne	22	4	18	0	1706	2285	74.7	16	

Source: AFL ladder
Rules for classification: 1) points; 2) percentage; 3) number of points for.
(P) Premiers
