= 2001 Brownlow Medal =

- Date: 24 September
- Location: Crown Palladium
- Winner: Jason Akermanis (Brisbane); 23 votes

Television/radio coverage
- Network: Seven Network

The 2001 Brownlow Medal was the 74th year the award was presented to the player adjudged the fairest and best player during the Australian Football League (AFL) home-and-away season. Jason Akermanis of the Brisbane Lions won the medal by polling 23 votes during the 2001 AFL season.

== Leading vote-getters ==
	Player	Votes
1st	Jason Akermanis (Brisbane)	23
2nd	Andrew McLeod (Adelaide)	21
3rd	Michael Voss (Brisbane Lions)	19
	Josh Francou (Port Adelaide)*	19
4th	Ben Cousins (West Coast)	18
=5th	Jason Johnson (Essendon)	16
=5th	Brent Harvey (Kangaroos)	16
	Matthew Lloyd (Essendon)*	15
=7th	Shannon Grant (Kangaroos)	14
=7th	Nathan Buckley (Collingwood)	14
	Shane Crawford (Hawthorn)*	14
9th	Ben Graham (Geelong)	13
=10th	Simon Black (Brisbane Lions)	12
=10th	Shane O'Bree (Collingwood)	12

* The player was ineligible to win the medal due to suspension by the AFL Tribunal during the year.
