= 2002 Brownlow Medal =

- Date: 23 September
- Location: Marvel Stadium, Docklands, Victoria, Australia
- Hosted by: Stephen Quartermain
- Winner: Simon Black (Brisbane); 25 votes

Television/radio coverage
- Network: Network Ten

The 2002 Brownlow Medal was the 75th year the award was presented to the player adjudged the fairest and best player during the Australian Football League (AFL) home-and-away season. Simon Black of the Brisbane Lions won the medal by polling twenty-five votes during the 2002 AFL season.

== Leading vote-getters ==
	Player	Votes
1st	Simon Black (Brisbane)	25
2nd	Josh Francou (Port Adelaide)	21
=3rd	Adem Yze (Melbourne)	17
=3rd	Shane Crawford (Hawthorn)	17
=3rd	Michael Voss (Brisbane)	17
=6th	Des Headland (Brisbane)	16
=6th	Luke Darcy (Western Bulldogs)	16
=6th	Travis Johnstone (Melbourne)	16
=6th	Ben Cousins (West Coast)	16
=6th	Paul Williams (Sydney)	16
	Andrew McLeod (Adelaide)*	16

* The player was ineligible to win the medal due to suspension by the AFL Tribunal during the year.
