= 1995 Brownlow Medal =

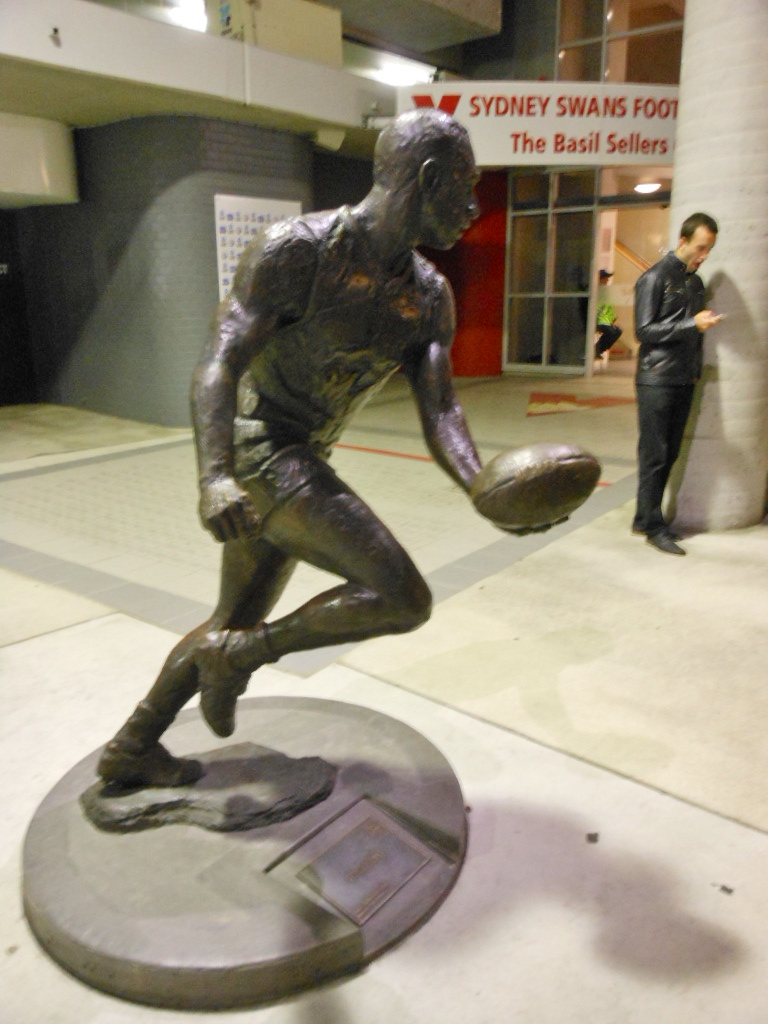
- Winner: Paul Kelly (Sydney); 21 votes

Television/radio coverage
- Network: Seven Network

The 1995 Brownlow Medal was the 68th year the award was presented to the player adjudged the fairest and best player during the Australian Football League (AFL) home-and-away season.

Paul Kelly of the Sydney Swans won the medal by polling twenty-one votes during the 1995 AFL season. For the first time, the State Government legalised betting on the Brownlow Medal, a move which concerned some due to the high potential for corruption. The pre-count favourites for the medal were Wayne Carey (3/1), Wayne Campbell (7/2), Peter Matera (10/1), James Hird and Craig Bradley (each 12/1). Eventual winner Paul Kelly was considered a 25/1 outside chance.

== Leading vote-getters ==
	Player	Votes
1st	Paul Kelly (Sydney)	21
	Darren Jarman (Hawthorn)*	18
	Garry Hocking (Geelong)*	17
=2nd	Michael Long (Essendon)	16
=2nd	Matthew Knights (Richmond)	16
=2nd	Robert Harvey (St Kilda)	16
=2nd	Paul Couch (Geelong)	16
6th	Jim Stynes (Melbourne)	15
=7th	Wayne Carey (North Melbourne)	14
=7th	Tony Liberatore (Footscray)	14
=9th	Peter Matera (West Coast)	13
=9th	Scott Chisholm (Fremantle)	13
=9th	Michael Voss (Brisbane Bears)	13
=9th	Wayne Schwass (North Melbourne)	13
	Andrew Jarman (Adelaide)*	13
	Stewart Loewe (St Kilda)*	13

* The player was ineligible to win the medal due to suspension by the AFL Tribunal during the year.
