= Michael Voss =

Australian rules footballer (born 1975)

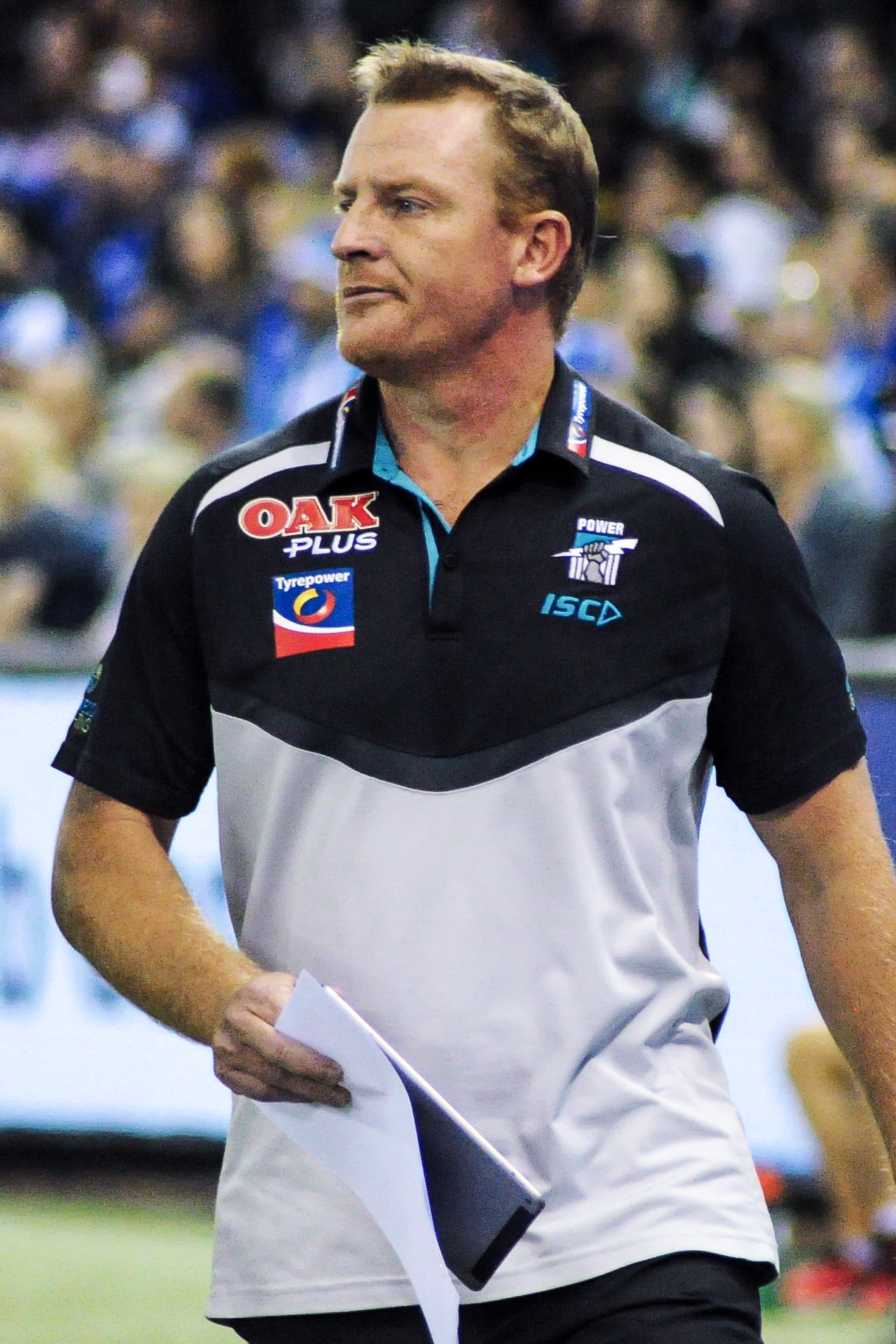
- Voss in April 2018

Personal information
- Full name: Michael Voss
- Born: 7 July 1975 (age 51); Traralgon, Victoria
- Original team: Morningside (AFLQ)
- Debut: Round 18 1992, Brisbane Bears vs. Fitzroy, at Princes Park
- Height: 183 cm (6 ft 0 in)
- Weight: 88 kg (194 lb)
- Position: Midfielder

Playing career^{1}
Years	Club	Games (Goals)
1992–1996	Brisbane Bears	79 (72)
1997–2006	Brisbane Lions	210 (173)
Total		289 (245)

Representative team honours
Years	Team	Games (Goals)
1992–1993	Queensland	2 (0)
1996	Allies	1 (0)

International team honours
2001–2006	Australia	4 (0)

Coaching career^{3}
Years	Club	Games (W–L–D)
2009–2013	Brisbane Lions	109 (43–65–1)
2022–2026	Carlton	103 (49–53–1)
Total		212 (92–118–2)
- ^{1} Playing statistics correct to the end of 2006.^{3} Coaching statistics correct as of 2026.

Career highlights
- 3× AFL Premiership: 2001, 2002, 2003; Brownlow Medal: 1996; 2× Leigh Matthews Trophy: 2002, 2003; 5× All-Australian team: 1996, 1999, 2001, 2002, 2003; 3× Merrett–Murray Medal: 2000, 2001, 2003; 2× Brisbane Bears Club Champion: 1995, 1996; Australian Football Hall of Fame; 4× AFLPA best captain: 2001, 2002, 2003, 2004; AFLPA Robert Rose Most Courageous Player Award: 2001; Brisbane Lions captain: 1997–2006; Lou Richards Medal: 2001

Michael Voss (born 7 July 1975) is a former professional Australian rules football player and coach. Widely regarded as one of the greatest midfielders and captains of the modern era, his playing career is distinguished by both individual accolades and team success with the Brisbane Lions.

Voss was recruited by the Brisbane Bears from Morningside and played 289 games for the Bears and the Lions. He captained the Brisbane Lions to a run of three consecutive premierships from 2001 to 2003. He was the Lions' longest-serving captain, holding the role from 1997 to 2006. Voss won the Brownlow Medal in 1996 in a tie with James Hird and was the only Bears player in history to win the award. He won the Leigh Matthews Trophy twice in 2002 and 2003 and was named in the All-Australian team five times (1996, 1999, 2001, 2002, 2003), including as captain in 2002 and 2003. He won a combined five club best-and-fairest awards across the two clubs: the Brisbane Bears Club Champion twice (1995, 1996) and the Brisbane Lions Merrett-Murray Medal three times (2000, 2001, 2003).

Voss transitioned into coaching following his playing retirement, including two senior coaching roles separated by a lengthy period as an assistant. In 2009, Voss returned to his former club as senior coach, succeeding Leigh Matthews. In his first season, he led the Lions to their first finals campaign since 2004. His tenure ended in August 2013. After being an assistant coach at Port Adelaide from 2015 to 2021, Voss was appointed Carlton's senior coach in September 2021. He led the Blues to a preliminary final appearance in the 2023 season, ending a decade-long finals drought for the club. However after missing the finals in 2025 and only winning the opening game in 2026, Voss resigned as coach after round 9.

== Early life ==
Voss was born in Traralgon, Victoria and lived as a child in Orbost until the age of 11, when he moved with his family to Beenleigh, a northern suburb of the Gold Coast at the time. Voss attended Trinity College during his high-school years in Queensland. His younger brother Brett also played for the Brisbane Lions before transferring to St Kilda Football Club to enhance his opportunities to play senior football.

Voss's football skills were excellent from an early age. He made his senior debut for Morningside in the QAFL at the age of 15 years. A year later, he kicked 14 goals for Queensland in a second-division under-17 representative match, going on to win the inaugural Hunter Harrison Medal for the tournament.

Voss grew up supporting the Carlton Football Club.

== Playing career ==
=== Brisbane Bears ===
==== Rise to stardom ====
At 17 years and 11 days of age in 1992, he debuted for the Brisbane Bears against Fitzroy at Princes Park in Melbourne in Round 18, 1992, the youngest-ever player to play a senior game for the club.

Although highly skilled, he was also slight, but he worked to get the most out of his body. By 1996, he was one of the most accomplished players in the competition, and at the end of the season he shared the Brownlow Medal, the game's highest individual honour, with James Hird. In doing so, Voss became the first Queenslander to win the Brownlow Medal in 1996.

=== Brisbane Lions ===
At the end of 1996, following the merger of the Fitzroy Football Club and the Brisbane Bears, Voss and teammate Alastair Lynch were named as inaugural co-captains of the newly formed Brisbane Lions. In 2019, Kobe Howard described Voss as "one of the game's greatest players" in Australian football history.

In 1998, Voss suffered a catastrophic injury while contesting a mark at Subiaco Oval in Perth in a match against Fremantle. He collided with Fremantle's Shane Parker and broke his lower leg in half. The subsequent operation was at Sir Charles Gairdner Hospital, and it was a year before he was fit and in training to play again. This injury, along with the destabilisation caused by the merger of Fitzroy and the Bears, was a key factor in the Brisbane Lions finishing 16th (last) with a record of 5 wins, 16 losses, and 1 draw.

==== Premiership and captaincy success ====
Voss captained the Brisbane Lions in four consecutive AFL Grand Finals, yielding three premierships (2001–2003). His performance in the 2002 Grand Final against Collingwood was an outstanding example of courage, skill and leadership, only narrowly conceding the Norm Smith Medal to opposing captain and former Bears teammate Nathan Buckley.

==== Later career ====
In early 2004, Voss kicked a career-best seven goals against a struggling Adelaide at AAMI Stadium as coach Leigh Matthews looked to play him in the forward line during the latter part of his career. However, a heavy injury toll to the Lions meant that Voss continued his career in the midfield.

In 2005, Voss suffered a badly cut calf before Round 2 while renovating his home. He recovered to play his 250th game the following week, but the Lions suffered an embarrassing six-point loss to eventual premiers Sydney after they had led by 32 points at the final change. Prior to this, Voss had suffered from tendinitis of the knee but had been able to curtail the problem. The calf injury affected his performances, with the four games after the injury yielding a high possession count of only 16. Voss later improved, and in Round 21 picked up 35 possessions against Port Adelaide.

Soon after the completion of the 2006 season, Voss announced his retirement from his playing career after 289 games and 15 years at the Brisbane Bears and Lions with three premierships and a Brownlow Medal to his name. He was subsequently employed as a sports journalist by Channel 10 in Brisbane. Voss said farewell in what turned out to be his last game, at the Gabba in Round 22 against St Kilda, gathering 34 possessions and two Brownlow Medal votes as a struggling Brisbane Lions team went down by 50 points to finals-bound St Kilda, who won on Brisbane's turf for the first time in a decade. Despite losing badly, the Lions received a long-standing ovation from a sold-out home crowd after the game for their prior premiership efforts as well as general farewell to several other players.

== Coaching career ==
When announcing his retirement at the end of Brisbane's 2006 season, there was speculation that Voss would soon become a senior coach or join Leigh Matthews in the Brisbane Lions coaching team. Voss instead joined the Channel 10 sports commentary team.

Voss coached Australia's AIS Under-17 squad to victory against the South African national Australian rules football team at North West Cricket Stadium in Potchefstroom, South Africa.

Voss was often mentioned as a candidate to coach the Melbourne Demons after the resignation of Neale Daniher. He was also linked to various other coaching positions, most notably Carlton.

In May 2008, Voss accepted a consultancy role with the newly established GC17 bid team and was seen by many to be the likely inaugural coach of the Gold Coast side, but he instead signed a two-year deal with the West Coast Eagles as an assistant coach, which formally removed him from the running for the vacant Gold Coast senior coaching position.

=== Brisbane Lions senior coach (2009–2013) ===
When Leigh Matthews, senior coach of the Brisbane Lions, resigned at the end of their 2008 season, Eagles' chief executive Trevor Nisbett gave Voss permission to talk with his former club. The Lions later announced Voss as their new senior coach until the end of 2011.

Voss made his coaching debut in Brisbane's defeat of the West Coast Eagles in Round 1, 2009.

In Voss's first season as senior coach of the Brisbane Lions in the 2009 season, he guided the Brisbane Lions into their first finals campaign since 2004, including a comeback elimination final victory over Carlton after trailing by 30 points early in the fourth quarter. However, the Lions under Voss were eliminated in the semi-finals by the Western Bulldogs.

His next two years were not as successful on-field. After the club won its first four matches to be sitting on top of the ladder early in the 2010 season, the Lions under Voss would only win three more games, finishing 13th (out of 16) on the ladder. The Lions' 2011 Season was even worse, with the Lions under Voss finishing 15th (out of 17 teams), its worst placing since 1998 when it won the wooden spoon. This continued in the 2012 season, when the Lions under Voss finished 13th on the ladder. The Lions with Voss kept struggling in the 2013 season, where the Lions sat 12th on the ladder with eight wins and eleven losses after Round 19, 2013.

On 13 August 2013, Voss was told that he would not be receiving a contract extension with the Lions for 2014. Voss then opted not to coach out his contract, which expired at the end of the 2013 season. Voss was then replaced by assistant coach Mark Harvey as caretaker senior coach of the Brisbane Lions for the remainder of the 2013 season. Justin Leppitsch was eventually appointed as the new senior coach of the Lions from 2014 onwards.

Voss left the club having coached 109 games for the Lions, achieving 43 wins, 65 losses, and 1 draw, for a winning percentage of 39.91%.

=== Port Adelaide Football Club assistant coach (2015–2021) ===
In October 2014, Voss joined the Port Adelaide Football Club as an assistant coach under senior coach Ken Hinkley in the position of midfield manager, replacing Phil Walsh, who had joined the Adelaide Football Club. One measure of his success at Port is the number of their midfielders selected for the All-Australian team Robbie Gray (2014, 2017, 2018) Chad Wingard (2015), Travis Boak (2020), and 2021 Brownlow medallist Ollie Wines (2021). Voss left the Port Adelaide Football club at the end of the 2021 season.

=== Carlton Football Club senior coach (2022–2026) ===
In September 2021, following seven years as an assistant with the Power, Voss officially returned to the AFL's senior coaching ranks after being appointed senior coach of the Carlton Football Club. Voss replaced David Teague as Carlton's senior coach, after Teague was sacked at the end of the 2021 season. Carlton Football Club President Luke Sayers on the appointment of Voss as senior coach said in a statement: "After a thorough and considered selection process, Voss's credentials and vast experience in football made him the right person for the job."

In the 2022 season, Voss took a leave of absence for one game in Round 2, 2022, against the Western Bulldogs after he tested positive for COVID-19. Assistant coach Ashley Hansen filled in as caretaker interim senior coach in the absence of Voss, and Carlton won the game by 12 points. Voss resumed his role as senior coach in Round 3, 2022, against Hawthorn, where Carlton won by a point. Carlton under Voss, in his first year as senior coach, finished ninth at the end of the 2022 season, with twelve wins (of which Voss coached eleven) and ten losses but did not make finals.

Carlton under Voss in his second year as senior coach, finished fifth on the ladder with thirteen wins, nine losses and one draw, therefore making the finals at the end of the 2023 season, the Blues' first finals appearance in a decade, this included two finals win, which meant the team made a Preliminary Final for the first time in 23 years. Carlton under Voss were however eliminated by Brisbane Lions in the preliminary final.

Carlton under Voss reached the finals in the 2024 season after the club finished eighth but were eliminated by Brisbane Lions in the elimination final.

Carlton under Voss finished eleventh in the 2025 season and did not make finals.

On 12 May 2026, Voss resigned as senior coach of the Carlton Football Club effective immediately after Round 9 of the 2026 season due to poor on-field results, where the club sat sixteenth on the ladder with one win and eight losses. Voss was replaced by assistant coach Josh Fraser as caretaker senior coach of Carlton for the remainder of the 2026 season. Fraser was eventually appointed full-time senior coach of Carlton.

Voss coached 103 games for Carlton, achieving 49 wins, 53 losses, and 1 draw, for a winning percentage of 48.06%.

== Statistics ==
=== Playing statistics ===
Legend
G	Goals	K	Kicks	D	Disposals	T	Tackles
B	Behinds	H	Handballs	M	Marks
#	Played in that season's premiership team	±	Won that season's Brownlow Medal

Season	Team	No.	Games	Totals							Averages (per game)							Votes
Season	Team	No.	Games	G	B	K	H	D	M	T	G	B	K	H	D	M	T	Votes
1992	Brisbane Bears	56	6	2	2	61	58	119	22	11	0.3	0.3	10.2	9.7	19.8	3.7	1.8	0
1993	Brisbane Bears	3	16	7	1	141	116	257	65	22	0.4	0.1	8.8	7.3	16.1	4.1	1.4	1
1994	Brisbane Bears	3	12	10	2	105	63	168	34	13	0.8	0.2	8.8	5.3	14.0	2.8	1.1	0
1995	Brisbane Bears	3	21	30	15	285	207	492	88	30	1.4	0.7	13.6	9.9	23.4	4.2	1.4	13
1996	Brisbane Bears	3	24	23	12	336	236	572	87	55	1.0	0.5	14.0	9.8	23.8	3.6	2.3	21
1997	Brisbane Lions	3	17	9	12	185	152	337	40	21	0.5	0.7	10.9	8.9	19.8	2.4	1.2	4
1998	Brisbane Lions	3	11	4	5	117	122	239	31	22	0.4	0.5	10.6	11.1	21.7	2.8	2.0	7
1999	Brisbane Lions	3	21	23	13	248	145	393	63	34	1.1	0.6	11.8	6.9	18.7	3.0	1.6	10
2000	Brisbane Lions	3	23	14	16	318	232	550	103	64	0.6	0.7	13.8	10.1	23.9	4.5	2.8	16
2001^{#}	Brisbane Lions	3	25	21	19	363	240	603	98	67	0.8	0.8	14.5	9.6	24.1	3.9	2.7	19
2002^{#}	Brisbane Lions	3	22	36	21	283	184	467	88	47	1.6	1.0	12.9	8.4	21.2	4.0	2.1	17
2003^{#}	Brisbane Lions	3	25	20	17	283	252	535	105	66	0.8	0.7	11.3	10.1	21.4	4.2	2.6	19
2004	Brisbane Lions	3	24	31	17	276	231	507	97	58	1.3	0.7	11.5	9.6	21.1	4.0	2.4	10
2005	Brisbane Lions	3	21	12	4	241	201	442	92	49	0.6	0.2	11.5	9.6	21.0	4.4	2.3	6
2006	Brisbane Lions	3	21	3	5	232	230	462	104	54	0.1	0.2	11.0	11.0	22.0	5.0	2.6	7
Career			289	245	161	3474	2669	6143	1117	613	0.8	0.6	12.0	9.2	21.3	3.9	2.1	150

== Head coaching record ==
Team	Year	Home and Away Season					Finals			
Team	Year	Won	Lost	Drew	Win %	Position	Won	Lost	Win %	Result
BRI	2009	13	8	1	.614	6th out of 16	1	1	.500	Lost to Western Bulldogs in Semi Final
BRI	2010	7	15	0	.318	13th out of 16	—	—	—	—
BRI	2011	4	18	0	.182	15th out of 17	—	—	—	—
BRI	2012	10	12	0	.455	13th out of 18	—	—	—	—
BRI	2013	8	11	0	.421	12th out of 18	—	—	—	fired after round 20
BRI Total		42	64	1	.397		1	1	.500	
CARL	2022	11	10	0	.524	9th out of 18	—	—	—	—
CARL	2023	13	9	1	.587	5th out of 18	2	1	.667	Lost to Brisbane in Preliminary Final
CARL	2024	13	10	0	.565	8th out of 18	0	1	.000	Lost to Brisbane in Elimination Final
CARL	2025	9	14	0	.391	11th out of 18	—	—	—	—
CARL	2026	1	8	0	.111	16th out of 18	—	—	—	resigned after round 9
CARL Total		47	51	1	.480		2	2	.500	
Total		89	115	2	.437		3	3	.500	

== Honours and achievements ==
**Brownlow Medal votes**
Season	Votes
1992	—
1993	1
1994	—
1995	13
**1996**	**21**
1997	4
1998	7
1999	10
2000	16
2001	19
2002	17
2003	19
2004	10
2005	6
2006	7
**Total**	**150**
Key:
Green / **Bold** = Won

- Team:
  - AFL Premiership (Brisbane Lions): 2001 (C), 2002 (C), 2003 (C)
- Individual:
  - Brownlow Medal: 1996 (tied with James Hird)
  - Brisbane Bears Club Champion: 1995, 1996
  - Merrett–Murray Medal (Brisbane Lions): 2000, 2001, 2003
  - Brisbane Lions Captain: 1997–2006
  - All-Australian: 1996, 1999, 2001, 2002 (C), 2003 (C)
  - AFLPA Most Valuable Player Award (Leigh Matthews Trophy): 2002, 2003
  - AFLPA Best Captain Award: 2001, 2002 2003, 2004
  - AFLPA Robert Rose Most Courageous Player Award: 2001
  - Herald Sun Player of the Year Award: 2003
  - Lou Richards Medal: 2001
  - Australian Football Media Association Player of the Year Award: 2001

== Post-playing career ==
Voss joined the Network Ten AFL commentary team in 2007 in a special comments role. He was also appointed as sports presenter on 10 News First Queensland and remained in the role for a year.

In 2011, Voss was inducted into the Australian Football Hall of Fame.

During the 2024 pre-finals bye, Voss witnessed a stolen car crash and flip outside Barton Café in Hawthorn, Victoria. After a short foot chase, assisted by Barton Milk Bar owner James Laskie, Voss tackled the 16-year-old suspect that was in possession of a kitchen knife and held the suspect through a citizen's arrest until police arrived at the scene. An 18-year-old suspect evaded capture but was later arrested in connection to the theft. Michael Voss left the scene uninjured and collected his coffees from the café. Carlton player Sam Walsh was eating breakfast in the same café during the incident.

On Saturday 20 June 2026, one month after he resigned as Carlton coach, it was announced that Voss will resume his media career the following week, this time at Fox Footy as part of the "TNF on Fox" crew.

== Controversy ==
In 2007, Voss was charged for his role in a melee with Simon Black, Fraser Gehrig and three other high-profile AFL players at a Melbourne nightclub. At the resulting trial, Voss agreed to enter a diversion program, and therefore no conviction was recorded.
