= Simon Prestigiacomo =

Australian rules footballer, born 1978

Personal information
- Born: 31 January 1978 (age 48)
- Original team: Research / Northern Knights
- Debut: Round 11, 16 June 1996, Collingwood vs. West Coast Eagles, at Subiaco
- Height: 193 cm (6 ft 4 in)
- Weight: 100 kg (220 lb)

Playing career^{1}
Years	Club	Games (Goals)
1996–2010	Collingwood	233 (3)
- ^{1} Playing statistics correct to the end of 2010.

Career highlights
- Harry Collier Trophy 1996; J.J. Joyce Trophy (2000) (3rd Collingwood best and fairest)

Simon 'Presti' Prestigiacomo (born 31 January 1978) is a retired Australian rules footballer who played for the Collingwood Football Club in the Australian Football League.

== Playing career ==
=== Early career: forward line ===
As a tall youngster that was capable as a strong forward that could also play in the midfield, Prestigiacomo was drafted from Research Junior Football Club at pick 10 in the 1995 AFL draft. He was given guernsey number 35, made famous by Collingwood legend Peter Daicos.

He made his debut against the West Coast Eagles in Round 11, 1996. His form was good enough for him to play the final twelve games in his debut year.

In 1997 his career was threatened to be almost over after contracting glandular fever throughout the season. He only managed six matches. He also struggled during the 1998 season with shoulder injuries, playing ten games and kicking two goals for the year. However, it was during this season when then-Collingwood assistant coach Danny Frawley would give Prestigiacomo defensive roles during Collingwood reserves games.

=== Mid career: back line ===
In 1999, Prestigiacomo made a breakthrough in his career, as his solid work in defence proved himself to be a required player. In Round 2, 2000 he played his 50th AFL game. He performed well enough to finish equal third in the 2000 best and fairest, finishing behind winner Nathan Buckley and Tarkyn Lockyer. Between seasons 1999–2002, Prestigiacomo played in 86 matches for Collingwood, missing only five.

Prestigiacomo was a key performer in the Collingwood season of 2002, when the club reached the Grand Final. He played every game except one and was very heavily relied on as a stopping defender, and less-so as a rebounding defender, and played in Collingwood's Grand Final loss against Brisbane. In 2003 he injured his knee late in the season, but returned for the final series and once again played in the Magpies' losing Grand Final team.

=== Late career ===
Prestigiacomo struggled with injury in 2004, but returned to full fitness in 2005, playing twenty matches that season, including his 150th. He returned to his best form in 2006 and 2007, but missed the 2007 finals with injury. In 2008, at age 30, injuries and form kept him out of the team for almost the entire season, but he returned late in the season for two matches, including an elimination final win, but an arm injury kept him out of the semi-final.

In 2009, Prestigiacomo had arguably the best season of his career, in which he played every game, including his 200th on Anzac Day. He was named in the 40-man squad for the 2009 All-Australian team, but was not selected in the final team.

Prestigiacomo managed to play only 13 games in 2010. He missed the finals with injury, and although he had recovered enough to come into consideration for selection in the drawn Grand Final, he considered that he had not recovered enough and voluntarily ruled himself out of contention, a decision for which he was widely praised by fans and commentators.

=== Post-AFL ===
On 10 November 2010, Simon Prestigiacomo announced his retirement from the AFL after 233 games with Collingwood. Collingwood honoured Prestigiacomo, by having him unveil the 2010 Premiership Flag at the MCG in Round 3, 2011.

In 2011, Prestigiacomo played for West Preston Lakeside in the Northern Football League, alongside former Collingwood teammate, Anthony Rocca. He also played a once-off match for Bungaree in the Central Highlands Football League on Saturday 21 May against former teammate Shane O'Bree.

Matthew Richardson and Jonathan Brown are both quoted saying that Prestigiacomo is one of the hardest players they have ever had to play against.
