= 2003 AFL Grand Final =

Grand final of the 2003 Australian Football League season

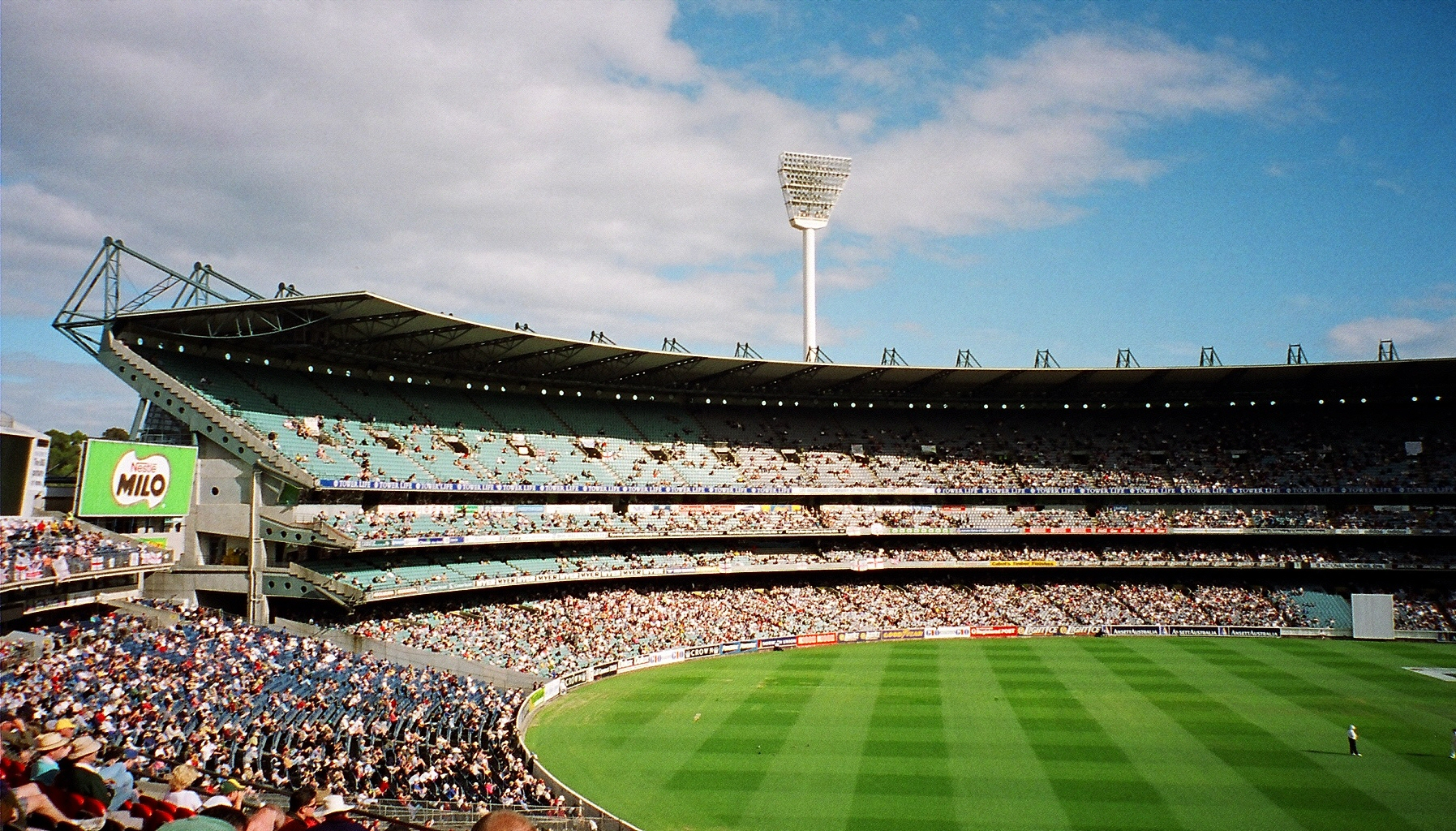
- The Melbourne Cricket Ground, the game's venue

Brisbane Lions	Collingwood
20.14 (134)	12.12 (84)
	1	2	3	4
BL	5.5 (35)	11.7 (73)	14.12 (96)	20.14 (134)
COL	3.3 (21)	4.7 (31)	9.7 (61)	12.12 (84)
- Date: 27 September 2003, 2:40pm
- Stadium: Melbourne Cricket Ground
- Attendance: 79,451
- Favourite: Collingwood
- Umpires: #3 Stephen McBurney, #7 Hayden Kennedy, #10 Brett Allen
- Coin toss won by: Michael Voss (Brisbane Lions)
- Kicked toward: Punt Road End

Ceremonies
- Pre-match entertainment: Christine Anu, Gorgi Quill, the finalists from the first season of Australian Idol
- National anthem: Christine Anu

Accolades
- Norm Smith Medallist: Simon Black (Brisbane Lions)
- Jock McHale Medallist: Leigh Matthews (Brisbane Lions)

Broadcast in Australia
- Network: Network Ten
- Commentators: Stephen Quartermain (Host and Commentator); Anthony Hudson (Commentator); Robert Walls (Expert Commentator); Christi Malthouse (Boundary Rider); Gerard Whateley (Boundary Rider); Malcolm Blight (Analyst); Stephen Silvagni (Analyst)

The 2003 AFL Grand Final was an Australian rules football game contested between the Brisbane Lions and the Collingwood Football Club, held at the Melbourne Cricket Ground in Melbourne on 27 September 2003. It was the 107th annual grand final of the Australian Football League (formerly the Victorian Football League), (Note: In 1897 and 1924 there were no grand finals and instead the premier was decided by a finals play-off. In 1948 and 1977 there were grand final replays after initial draws.) staged to determine the premiers for the 2003 AFL season. The match, attended by 79,451 spectators, was won by Brisbane by a margin of 50 points, marking the club's third premiership victory, all won consecutively from 2001 to 2003.

== Background ==
Brisbane had appeared in the AFL Grand Final for the past two years, winning both contests. Collingwood had competed against Brisbane in the previous year's grand final, losing by 9 points.

At the conclusion of the home and away season, Port Adelaide had finished first on the AFL ladder with 18 wins and 4 losses, winning their second successive McClelland Trophy. Collingwood finished second with 15 wins and 7 losses, and Brisbane was third with 14 wins, 7 losses and a draw. The two sides faced each other in a low-scoring qualifying final won by Collingwood, 9.12 (66) d. 7.9 (51). Brisbane comfortably defeated Adelaide in its semi-final by 46 points; and then both clubs had comfortable preliminary final victories, Collingwood dominating throughout its match against Port Adelaide to win by 44 points; and Brisbane kicking away from Sydney with a six goals to nil final quarter, also winning by 44 points.

In the week prior to the grand final, Collingwood forward Anthony Rocca was suspended during the week for an elbow to the head of Port Adelaide's Brendon Lade player during the preliminary final; Rocca had played every game of the year and kicked 45 goals, and had also been one of Collingwood's best in the previous year's grand final, and his suspension was considered a major blow to the Magpies' chances; Tristen Walker took Rocca's place in the team. Brisbane's had numerous key players under injury clouds, including captain Michael Voss with an injured knee, Nigel Lappin with broken ribs and both Alastair Lynch and Martin Pike with hamstring injuries, but all four ended up playing.

The build-up was further magnified due to the Brisbane's chance of being the first team since Melbourne in the 1950s to win three successive premierships. Attention was also focussed on whether Collingwood would avenge their close loss to Brisbane in the previous year's grand final. In the week leading up to the grand final, Collingwood's Nathan Buckley was awarded the Brownlow Medal, which was tied among Buckley, Sydney's Adam Goodes and Adelaide's Mark Ricciuto.

The match attendance of 79,451 spectators was the smallest grand Final attendance at the MCG since the 1946 VFL Grand Final, owing to a part of the grandstands having been demolished to make way for the construction of new seating at the ground for the 2006 Commonwealth Games.

== Match summary ==
=== First quarter ===
The Lions dominated the Magpies and led throughout the majority of the match, gaining the lead inside the first two minutes and never relinquishing it. The Lions led 5.5 (35) to Collingwood's 3.3 (21) at quarter time.

=== Second quarter ===
Two early Brisbane goals extended the margin to 25 points five minutes into the second quarter; and while Alan Didak was able to peg one back for Collingwood in the 9th minute, a flurry of four goals to Brisbane in the latter part of the quarter opened a game-winning 42 points half time lead, from which Collingwood never seriously challenged.

=== Third quarter ===
Collingwood won the third quarter, kicking two early goals to bring the margin back to 30 points, but overall after kicking 5.0 (30) to Brisbane's 3.5 (23) for the quarter, the difference was still a nearly insurmountable 35 points at three-quarter time.

=== Fourth quarter ===
Collingwood attacked hard to open the final quarter, but after four behinds, Brisbane ran away with the game, kicking five goals between the 15th and 26 minutes of the quarter to open a game-high 69-point lead. Three late goals to Collingwood narrowed the final margin to fifty points, Brisbane 20.14 (134) d. Collingwood 12.12 (84).

=== Norm Smith Medal ===
Simon Black of the Lions was awarded the Norm Smith Medal for being judged the best player afield. His 39 disposals set and, as of 2025, still holds the record for equal most disposals by a player in a grand final sharing that record with Christian Petracca (2021). Jason Akermanis kicked five goals for Brisbane.

Norm Smith Medal voting tally
Position	Player	Club	Total votes	Vote summary
1 (winner)	Simon Black	Brisbane Lions	15	3, 3, 3, 3, 3
2	Clark Keating	Brisbane Lions	7	2, 1, 1, 1, 2
3	Jason Akermanis	Brisbane Lions	6	1, 2, 0, 2, 1
4	Mal Michael	Brisbane Lions	2	0, 0, 2, 0, 0

Voter	Role	3 Votes	2 Votes	1 Vote
Dennis Cometti	Nine Network	Simon Black	Clark Keating	Jason Akermanis
Bruce Eva	AFL Record	Simon Black	Jason Akermanis	Clark Keating
Gerard Healy	3AW	Simon Black	Mal Michael	Clark Keating
Robert DiPierdomenico	3AW	Simon Black	Jason Akermanis	Clark Keating
Mark Stevens	Herald Sun	Simon Black	Clark Keating	Jason Akermanis

=== Post match ===
There it is, the Brisbane Lions have done it!

The Hawks, the Bombers, the Crows! They couldn't do it in the 80's or the 90's! But the Lions have gone back-to-back-to-back to become the greatest side of the modern era! They are football's Invincibles!

— Anthony Hudson on the full-time siren on Network Ten.

With this win, Brisbane became AFL premiers for the third consecutive year, the fifth team in VFL/AFL history to do so and first since 1955–57, earning a place among the greatest teams of the modern era. Brisbane went on to contest a fourth consecutive grand final in 2004, but lost that game to Port Adelaide by 40 points.

== Teams ==
Brisbane Lions	Collingwood

Brisbane Lions
B:	2 Chris Johnson	15 Mal Michael	33 Darryl White
HB:	6 Luke Power	23 Justin Leppitsch	44 Nigel Lappin
C:	12 Jason Akermanis	3 Michael Voss (c)	13 Martin Pike
HF:	9 Ashley McGrath	16 Jonathan Brown	30 Robert Copeland
F:	4 Craig McRae	11 Alastair Lynch	36 Daniel Bradshaw
Foll:	27 Clark Keating	20 Simon Black	32 Shaun Hart
Int:	19 Jamie Charman	1 Blake Caracella	10 Marcus Ashcroft
Int:	14 Richard Hadley		
Coach:	Leigh Matthews		

Collingwood
B:	26 Ben Johnson	14 Shane Wakelin	8 James Clement
HB:	39 Matthew Lokan	35 Simon Prestigiacomo	13 Richard Cole
C:	6 Brodie Holland	5 Nathan Buckley (c)	37 Ryan Lonie
HF:	11 Shane O'Bree	34 Jason Cloke	17 Scott Burns
F:	28 Ben Kinnear	38 Tristen Walker	20 Chris Tarrant
Foll:	25 Josh Fraser	2 Shane Woewodin	18 Paul Licuria
Int:	4 Alan Didak	29 Heath Scotland	22 Rhyce Shaw
Int:	1 Leon Davis		
Coach:	Mick Malthouse		

== Scorecard ==
Scorecard
Saturday, 27 September 2:40pm	Brisbane Lions	def.	Collingwood	MCG (crowd: 79,451)	Report
5.5 (35); 11.7 (73); 14.12 (96); 20.14 (134)	Q1; Q2; Q3; Final	3.3 (21); 4.7 (31); 9.7 (61); 12.12 (84)	Umpires: McBurney, Kennedy, Allen; Norm Smith Medal: Simon Black (Brisbane Lions); Television broadcast: Network Ten; National anthem: Christine Anu
Akermanis 5 Lynch 4 Caracella, Brown 2 McRae, Pike, Hadley, Black, Leppitsch, Hart, Bradshaw 1	Goals	3 Didak; 2 Burns; 1 Davis, Woewodin, Buckley, Licuria, Tarrant, Fraser, Scotland
Black, Akermanis, Voss, Lappin, Hart, Michael, Pike, Power	Best	Fraser, Burns, Buckley, Johnson, Licuria
Nil	Injuries	Nil
Nil	Reports	Nil

== See also ==
- 2003 AFL season
