= 2003 AFL season =

107th season of the Australian Football League (AFL)

2003 AFL premiership season
- Teams: 16
- Premiers: Brisbane; 3rd premiership
- Minor premiers: Port Adelaide; 2nd minor premiership
- Pre-season cup: Adelaide; 1st pre-season cup win
- Brownlow Medallist: Nathan Buckley (Collingwood); Adam Goodes (Sydney); Mark Ricciuto (Adelaide)
- Coleman Medallist: Matthew Lloyd (Essendon)

Attendance
- Matches played: 185
- Total attendance: 6,351,655 (34,333 per match)
- Highest: 79,451 (Grand Final, Brisbane Lions vs. Collingwood)

The 2003 AFL season was the 107th season of the Australian Football League (AFL), the highest level of senior Australian rules football competition in Australia, which was known as the Victorian Football League until 1989. The season featured sixteen clubs, ran from 28 March until 27 September, and comprised a 22-game home-and-away season followed by a finals series featuring the top eight clubs.

The premiership was won by the Brisbane Lions for the third time and third time consecutively, after they defeated Collingwood by 50 points in the AFL Grand Final.

== Wizard Home Loans Cup ==
The 2003 Wizard Home Loans Cup saw Adelaide defeat Collingwood 15.14 (104) to 10.13 (73) in the final.

== Premiership season ==
=== Round 1 ===
Home team	Score	Away team	Score	Venue	Attendance	Date
Collingwood	13.16 (94)	Richmond	8.18 (66)	MCG	61,058	Friday, 28 March
Kangaroos	14.12 (96)	St Kilda	10.10 (70)	MCG	28,361	Saturday, 29 March
West Coast	17.20 (122)	Port Adelaide	11.8 (74)	Subiaco Oval	35,083	Saturday, 29 March
Sydney	22.14 (146)	Carlton	10.12 (72)	Telstra Stadium	30,803	Saturday, 29 March
Brisbane Lions	14.20 (104)	Essendon	8.13 (61)	The Gabba	36,197	Saturday, 29 March
Adelaide	22.13 (145)	Fremantle	13.11 (89)	AAMI Stadium	45,436	Sunday, 30 March
Melbourne	16.10 (106)	Hawthorn	15.10 (100)	MCG	41,888	Sunday, 30 March
Western Bulldogs	19.16 (130)	Geelong	13.13 (91)	Telstra Dome	27,931	Sunday, 30 March

=== Round 2 ===
Home team	Score	Away team	Score	Venue	Attendance	Date
Carlton	13.13 (91)	Collingwood	16.11 (107)	MCG	51,894	Friday, 4 April
Essendon	17.10 (112)	Melbourne	10.15 (75)	MCG	43,448	Saturday, 5 April
St Kilda	15.9 (99)	Adelaide	13.13 (91)	Telstra Dome	19,131	Saturday, 5 April
Port Adelaide	10.16 (76)	Brisbane Lions	13.8 (86)	AAMI Stadium	27,876	Saturday, 5 April
Fremantle	12.14 (86)	Sydney	8.12 (60)	Subiaco Oval	24,887	Saturday, 5 April
Hawthorn	13.13 (91)	West Coast	14.5 (89)	York Park	16,217	Sunday, 6 April
Geelong	9.17 (71)	Kangaroos	13.16 (94)	Skilled Stadium	22,588	Sunday, 6 April
Richmond	16.15 (111)	Western Bulldogs	13.11 (89)	Telstra Dome	28,847	Sunday, 6 April

=== Round 3 ===
Home team	Score	Away team	Score	Venue	Attendance	Date
Essendon	13.16 (94)	Carlton	15.15 (105)	MCG	44,268	Friday, 11 April
Collingwood	18.8 (116)	Geelong	10.9 (69)	MCG	43,979	Saturday, 12 April
West Coast	21.18 (144)	St Kilda	11.8 (74)	Subiaco Oval	32,009	Saturday, 12 April
Kangaroos	16.13 (109)	Brisbane Lions	16.13 (109)	Telstra Dome	24,359	Saturday, 12 April
Port Adelaide	19.14 (128)	Hawthorn	11.5 (71)	AAMI Stadium	24,902	Saturday, 12 April
Sydney	11.10 (76)	Adelaide	15.13 (103)	SCG	23,651	Sunday, 13 April
Melbourne	20.7 (127)	Western Bulldogs	14.11 (95)	Telstra Dome	20,790	Sunday, 13 April
Richmond	14.10 (94)	Fremantle	6.10 (46)	MCG	19,677	Sunday, 13 April

=== Round 4 ===
Home team	Score	Away team	Score	Venue	Attendance	Date
Brisbane Lions	14.11 (95)	Collingwood	11.15 (81)	The Gabba	36,803	Thursday, 17 April
Geelong	13.12 (90)	Melbourne	6.8 (44)	Skilled Stadium	23,001	Saturday, 19 April
Western Bulldogs	16.14 (110)	Essendon	20.9 (129)	Telstra Dome	35,238	Saturday, 19 April
Hawthorn	17.8 (110)	Sydney	10.8 (68)	MCG	26,359	Saturday, 19 April
Adelaide	15.16 (106)	West Coast	10.13 (73)	AAMI Stadium	43,525	Sunday, 20 April
Carlton	12.12 (84)	Port Adelaide	17.12 (114)	Optus Oval	22,507	Sunday, 20 April
Fremantle	25.17 (167)	Kangaroos	19.8 (122)	Subiaco Oval	25,435	Sunday, 20 April
St Kilda	11.15 (81)	Richmond	17.5 (107)	Telstra Dome	44,382	Monday, 21 April

=== Round 5 ===
Home team	Score	Away team	Score	Venue	Attendance	Date
Essendon	23.9 (147)	Collingwood	12.9 (81)	MCG	62,589	Friday, 25 April
Sydney	17.7 (109)	Melbourne	13.7 (85)	SCG	24,286	Friday, 25 April
Hawthorn	14.11 (95)	Richmond	18.7 (115)	MCG	45,140	Saturday, 26 April
Kangaroos	16.17 (113)	Carlton	18.14 (122)	Telstra Dome	38,094	Saturday, 26 April
Adelaide	9.12 (66)	Port Adelaide	12.6 (78)	AAMI Stadium	51,140	Saturday, 26 April
Brisbane Lions	15.16 (106)	Western Bulldogs	12.7 (79)	The Gabba	24,341	Sunday, 27 April
St Kilda	18.11 (119)	Geelong	11.8 (74)	Telstra Dome	27,240	Sunday, 27 April
Fremantle	10.13 (73)	West Coast	16.12 (108)	Subiaco Oval	41,654	Sunday, 27 April

=== Round 6 ===
Home team	Score	Away team	Score	Venue	Attendance	Date
Kangaroos	9.16 (70)	Adelaide	19.10 (124)	Telstra Dome	38,469	Friday, 2 May
Carlton	9.9 (63)	Hawthorn	11.8 (74)	Optus Oval	27,725	Saturday, 3 May
Melbourne	14.10 (94)	West Coast	19.13 (127)	MCG	17,534	Saturday, 3 May
Collingwood	13.11 (89)	Sydney	17.7 (109)	Telstra Dome	41,874	Saturday, 3 May
Port Adelaide	12.12 (84)	Richmond	8.9 (57)	AAMI Stadium	29,608	Saturday, 3 May
Geelong	12.6 (78)	Brisbane Lions	13.14 (92)	Skilled Stadium	21,246	Sunday, 4 May
Western Bulldogs	12.13 (85)	St Kilda	15.10 (100)	Telstra Dome	27,278	Sunday, 4 May
Fremantle	20.11 (131)	Essendon	15.10 (100)	Subiaco Oval	28,492	Sunday, 4 May

=== Round 7 ===
Home team	Score	Away team	Score	Venue	Attendance	Date
Hawthorn	13.11 (89)	Kangaroos	18.9 (117)	Telstra Dome	32,435	Friday, 9 May
Richmond	11.18 (84)	Essendon	5.12 (42)	MCG	52,196	Saturday, 10 May
West Coast	17.11 (113)	Geelong	14.13 (97)	Subiaco Oval	36,268	Saturday, 10 May
St Kilda	16.17 (113)	Carlton	15.11 (101)	Telstra Dome	45,122	Saturday, 10 May
Adelaide	16.13 (109)	Collingwood	18.6 (114)	AAMI Stadium	44,706	Saturday, 10 May
Sydney	15.8 (98)	Brisbane Lions	11.13 (79)	SCG	23,276	Sunday, 11 May
Melbourne	16.15 (111)	Port Adelaide	12.12 (84)	MCG	12,410	Sunday, 11 May
Western Bulldogs	10.12 (72)	Fremantle	23.17 (155)	Telstra Dome	12,542	Sunday, 11 May

=== Round 8 ===
Home team	Score	Away team	Score	Venue	Attendance	Date
Hawthorn	8.5 (53)	Essendon	15.16 (106)	MCG	48,006	Friday, 16 May
Collingwood	15.13 (103)	West Coast	18.11 (119)	Telstra Dome	39,912	Saturday, 17 May
Port Adelaide	15.13 (103)	Kangaroos	7.7 (49)	AAMI Stadium	24,702	Saturday, 17 May
Richmond	17.10 (112)	Melbourne	16.7 (103)	MCG	38,063	Saturday, 17 May
Brisbane Lions	16.11 (107)	Adelaide	12.17 (89)	The Gabba	34,469	Saturday, 17 May
Sydney	17.10 (112)	Geelong	11.7 (73)	SCG	22,483	Sunday, 18 May
Carlton	15.17 (107)	Western Bulldogs	14.16 (100)	Optus Oval	20,602	Sunday, 18 May
Fremantle	18.15 (123)	St Kilda	11.16 (82)	Subiaco Oval	26,723	Sunday, 18 May

=== Round 9 ===
Home team	Score	Away team	Score	Venue	Attendance	Date
Essendon	14.12 (96)	Port Adelaide	23.8 (146)	Telstra Dome	35,390	Friday, 23 May
Carlton	11.10 (76)	Brisbane Lions	23.15 (153)	Optus Oval	24,906	Saturday, 24 May
Melbourne	10.11 (71)	Fremantle	16.5 (101)	MCG	17,009	Saturday, 24 May
Collingwood	22.17 (149)	St Kilda	12.12 (84)	Telstra Dome	46,096	Saturday, 24 May
West Coast	18.16 (124)	Richmond	11.6 (72)	Subiaco Oval	40,313	Saturday, 24 May
Kangaroos	12.12 (84)	Sydney	8.11 (59)	Manuka Oval	13,832	Sunday, 25 May
Geelong	16.13 (109)	Hawthorn	11.9 (75)	Telstra Dome	28,001	Sunday, 25 May
Adelaide	16.13 (109)	Western Bulldogs	14.9 (93)	AAMI Stadium	44,342	Sunday, 25 May

=== Round 10 ===
Home team	Score	Away team	Score	Venue	Attendance	Date
Port Adelaide	14.14 (98)	Collingwood	10.13 (73)	AAMI Stadium	43,321	Friday, 30 May
Western Bulldogs	22.13 (145)	Kangaroos	24.12 (156)	Telstra Dome	24,682	Saturday, 31 May
Fremantle	19.13 (127)	Carlton	15.9 (99)	Subiaco Oval	33,250	Saturday, 31 May
Richmond	10.12 (72)	Sydney	16.8 (104)	MCG	34,569	Saturday, 31 May
Melbourne	9.9 (63)	Brisbane Lions	18.15 (123)	The Gabba	29,634	Saturday, 31 May
Geelong	8.11 (59)	Adelaide	11.10 (76)	Skilled Stadium	19,608	Sunday, 1 June
Essendon	19.14 (128)	West Coast	16.10 (106)	Telstra Dome	32,715	Sunday, 1 June
St Kilda	17.16 (118)	Hawthorn	14.6 (90)	MCG	25,745	Sunday, 1 June

=== Round 11 ===
Home team	Score	Away team	Score	Venue	Attendance	Date
Kangaroos	13.14 (92)	Richmond	13.11 (89)	Telstra Dome	43,200	Friday, 6 June
Hawthorn	11.9 (75)	Adelaide	10.10 (70)	MCG	25,841	Saturday, 7 June
St Kilda	13.12 (90)	Brisbane Lions	13.7 (85)	Telstra Dome	30,313	Saturday, 7 June
Sydney	21.7 (133)	Essendon	12.7 (79)	Telstra Stadium	45,917	Saturday, 7 June
Port Adelaide	16.16 (112)	Fremantle	9.9 (63)	AAMI Stadium	30,745	Sunday, 8 June
Geelong	17.13 (115)	Carlton	12.3 (75)	Telstra Dome	43,587	Sunday, 8 June
West Coast	19.10 (124)	Western Bulldogs	19.10 (124)	Subiaco Oval	38,540	Sunday, 8 June
Melbourne	10.17 (77)	Collingwood	20.13 (133)	MCG	60,010	Monday, 9 June

- The Kangaroos-Richmond game was especially notable for being the comeback of Kangaroos player Jason McCartney from life-threatening burns suffered in the 2002 Bali bombings. McCartney retired immediately after the match.

=== Round 12 ===
Home team	Score	Away team	Score	Venue	Attendance	Date
Essendon	13.10 (88)	Kangaroos	14.12 (96)	Telstra Dome	45,331	Friday, 13 June
St Kilda	7.15 (57)	Port Adelaide	15.9 (99)	York Park	17,763	Saturday, 14 June
Richmond	12.14 (86)	Carlton	14.9 (93)	MCG	36,557	Saturday, 14 June
Western Bulldogs	9.9 (63)	Sydney	19.13 (127)	SCG	21,742	Saturday, 14 June
Fremantle	13.10 (88)	Geelong	10.12 (72)	Subiaco Oval	30,127	Saturday, 14 June
Brisbane Lions	13.13 (91)	West Coast	24.16 (160)	The Gabba	31,185	Sunday, 15 June
Collingwood	6.15 (51)	Hawthorn	12.12 (84)	MCG	47,365	Sunday, 15 June
Adelaide	21.12 (138)	Melbourne	10.5 (65)	AAMI Stadium	40,178	Sunday, 15 June

=== Round 13 ===
Home team	Score	Away team	Score	Venue	Attendance	Date
Essendon	20.9 (129)	Geelong	15.3 (93)	Telstra Dome	48,374	Friday, 27 June
Melbourne	21.10 (136)	St Kilda	14.10 (94)	MCG	29,339	Saturday, 28 June
Port Adelaide	14.15 (99)	Sydney	8.12 (60)	AAMI Stadium	24,272	Saturday, 28 June
Western Bulldogs	12.13 (85)	Collingwood	18.20 (128)	Telstra Dome	42,952	Saturday, 28 June
Brisbane Lions	15.14 (104)	Richmond	9.7 (61)	The Gabba	32,623	Saturday, 28 June
Hawthorn	15.8 (98)	Fremantle	10.8 (68)	York Park	17,212	Sunday, 29 June
Carlton	7.8 (50)	Adelaide	13.14 (92)	Optus Oval	19,242	Sunday, 29 June
West Coast	11.10 (76)	Kangaroos	10.7 (67)	Subiaco Oval	36,641	Sunday, 29 June

=== Round 14 ===
Home team	Score	Away team	Score	Venue	Attendance	Date
St Kilda	7.9 (51)	Essendon	17.17 (119)	Telstra Dome	49,148	Friday, 4 July
Hawthorn	23.16 (154)	Western Bulldogs	12.11 (83)	MCG	31,390	Saturday, 5 July
Fremantle	10.15 (75)	Brisbane Lions	10.12 (72)	Subiaco Oval	28,450	Saturday, 5 July
Kangaroos	7.8 (50)	Collingwood	19.12 (126)	Telstra Dome	53,312	Saturday, 5 July
Adelaide	10.12 (72)	Richmond	6.8 (44)	AAMI Stadium	44,809	Saturday, 5 July
Sydney	13.14 (92)	West Coast	12.12 (84)	SCG	31,121	Sunday, 6 July
Carlton	14.6 (90)	Melbourne	14.13 (97)	Optus Oval	24,289	Sunday, 6 July
Geelong	10.10 (70)	Port Adelaide	10.9 (69)	Skilled Stadium	19,770	Sunday, 6 July

=== Round 15 ===
Home team	Score	Away team	Score	Venue	Attendance	Date
Adelaide	13.12 (90)	Essendon	7.7 (49)	AAMI Stadium	41,758	Friday, 11 July
Collingwood	15.9 (99)	Fremantle	7.16 (58)	MCG	40,964	Saturday, 12 July
Richmond	15.7 (97)	Geelong	15.11 (101)	Telstra Dome	38,546	Saturday, 12 July
Sydney	15.22 (112)	St Kilda	9.7 (61)	SCG	27,550	Saturday, 12 July
West Coast	28.19 (187)	Carlton	10.11 (71)	Subiaco Oval	39,129	Saturday, 12 July
Brisbane Lions	14.9 (93)	Hawthorn	11.15 (81)	The Gabba	29,684	Sunday, 13 July
Kangaroos	15.11 (101)	Melbourne	14.10 (94)	MCG	24,618	Sunday, 13 July
Western Bulldogs	14.9 (93)	Port Adelaide	15.18 (108)	Telstra Dome	14,784	Sunday, 13 July

=== Round 16 ===
Home team	Score	Away team	Score	Venue	Attendance	Date
Richmond	9.8 (62)	Collingwood	20.11 (131)	MCG	54,655	Friday, 18 July
Carlton	12.12 (84)	Sydney	18.7 (115)	Optus Oval	21,463	Saturday, 19 July
Hawthorn	17.11 (113)	Melbourne	15.16 (106)	MCG	32,029	Saturday, 19 July
Essendon	14.10 (94)	Brisbane Lions	12.14 (86)	Telstra Dome	47,744	Saturday, 19 July
Port Adelaide	17.12 (114)	West Coast	7.8 (50)	AAMI Stadium	37,624	Saturday, 19 July
Geelong	11.15 (81)	Western Bulldogs	15.9 (99)	Skilled Stadium	22,067	Sunday, 20 July
St Kilda	21.6 (132)	Kangaroos	19.13 (127)	Telstra Dome	25,381	Sunday, 20 July
Fremantle	13.13 (91)	Adelaide	13.12 (90)	Subiaco Oval	31,225	Sunday, 20 July

=== Round 17 ===
Home team	Score	Away team	Score	Venue	Attendance	Date
West Coast	14.14 (98)	Hawthorn	5.12 (42)	Subiaco Oval	40,127	Friday, 25 July
Kangaroos	16.8 (104)	Geelong	12.14 (86)	Manuka Oval	10,253	Saturday, 26 July
Melbourne	10.11 (71)	Essendon	13.10 (88)	MCG	33,368	Saturday, 26 July
Western Bulldogs	14.11 (95)	Richmond	24.11 (155)	Telstra Dome	25,204	Saturday, 26 July
Brisbane Lions	15.13 (103)	Port Adelaide	15.14 (104)	The Gabba	32,043	Saturday, 26 July
Sydney	17.9 (111)	Fremantle	14.13 (97)	SCG	30,228	Sunday, 27 July
Collingwood	20.15 (135)	Carlton	8.14 (62)	MCG	54,500	Sunday, 27 July
Adelaide	22.11 (143)	St Kilda	13.8 (86)	AAMI Stadium	44,667	Sunday, 27 July

=== Round 18 ===
Home team	Score	Away team	Score	Venue	Attendance	Date
Western Bulldogs	14.17 (101)	Melbourne	12.8 (80)	Telstra Dome	20,714	Friday, 1 August
Carlton	7.14 (56)	Essendon	13.12 (90)	MCG	40,697	Saturday, 2 August
Fremantle	15.14 (104)	Richmond	11.15 (81)	Subiaco Oval	31,725	Saturday, 2 August
Geelong	10.13 (73)	Collingwood	14.13 (97)	Telstra Dome	45,887	Saturday, 2 August
Brisbane Lions	20.17 (137)	Kangaroos	11.17 (83)	The Gabba	28,044	Saturday, 2 August
Adelaide	14.13 (97)	Sydney	14.9 (93)	AAMI Stadium	46,945	Sunday, 3 August
Hawthorn	11.14 (80)	Port Adelaide	12.12 (84)	MCG	21,415	Sunday, 3 August
St Kilda	19.14 (128)	West Coast	9.13 (67)	Telstra Dome	21,531	Sunday, 3 August

=== Round 19 ===
Home team	Score	Away team	Score	Venue	Attendance	Date
Melbourne	6.9 (45)	Geelong	11.18 (84)	MCG	22,508	Friday, 8 August
Collingwood	8.14 (62)	Brisbane Lions	15.11 (101)	MCG	61,868	Saturday, 9 August
West Coast	10.7 (67)	Adelaide	13.13 (91)	Subiaco Oval	39,681	Saturday, 9 August
Richmond	7.8 (50)	St Kilda	20.10 (130)	Telstra Dome	41,514	Saturday, 9 August
Sydney	14.9 (93)	Hawthorn	17.8 (110)	SCG	33,473	Saturday, 9 August
Port Adelaide	18.17 (125)	Carlton	12.9 (81)	AAMI Stadium	31,083	Sunday, 10 August
Essendon	22.15 (147)	Western Bulldogs	12.8 (80)	Telstra Dome	36,138	Sunday, 10 August
Kangaroos	15.8 (98)	Fremantle	15.9 (99)	MCG	18,486	Sunday, 10 August

=== Round 20 ===
Home team	Score	Away team	Score	Venue	Attendance	Date
Collingwood	15.18 (108)	Adelaide	11.5 (71)	Telstra Dome	45,367	Friday, 15 August
Carlton	11.9 (75)	St Kilda	26.10 (166)	Optus Oval	22,361	Saturday, 16 August
Geelong	9.9 (63)	West Coast	9.9 (63)	Skilled Stadium	19,202	Saturday, 16 August
Kangaroos	14.12 (96)	Hawthorn	16.14 (110)	Telstra Dome	29,234	Saturday, 16 August
Port Adelaide	17.10 (112)	Melbourne	15.8 (98)	AAMI Stadium	28,032	Saturday, 16 August
Brisbane Lions	10.16 (76)	Sydney	14.6 (90)	The Gabba	32,988	Sunday, 17 August
Essendon	13.14 (92)	Richmond	7.11 (53)	MCG	40,846	Sunday, 17 August
Fremantle	18.25 (133)	Western Bulldogs	12.5 (77)	Subiaco Oval	35,518	Sunday, 17 August

- Fremantle kicked a club record 25 behinds in their win against the Western Bulldogs. This record was later equalled during Round 3, 2026.

=== Round 21 ===
Home team	Score	Away team	Score	Venue	Attendance	Date
Hawthorn	20.18 (138)	Carlton	10.4 (64)	MCG	30,406	Friday, 22 August
Essendon	20.13 (133)	Fremantle	11.7 (73)	Telstra Dome	42,256	Saturday, 23 August
Adelaide	10.4 (64)	Kangaroos	9.20 (74)	AAMI Stadium	42,259	Saturday, 23 August
Brisbane Lions	19.9 (123)	Geelong	13.8 (86)	The Gabba	30,515	Saturday, 23 August
Sydney	12.9 (81)	Collingwood	14.15 (99)	Telstra Stadium	72,393	Saturday, 23 August
St Kilda	13.17 (95)	Western Bulldogs	3.12 (30)	York Park	15,637	Sunday, 24 August
Richmond	16.8 (104)	Port Adelaide	18.16 (124)	Telstra Dome	15,920	Sunday, 24 August
West Coast	21.17 (143)	Melbourne	14.7 (91)	Subiaco Oval	38,029	Sunday, 24 August

- The Sydney-Collingwood game is notable as it is the highest attended Australian rules football match ever played outside of Victoria.

=== Round 22 ===
Home team	Score	Away team	Score	Venue	Attendance	Date
Collingwood	12.11 (83)	Essendon	9.13 (67)	MCG	68,381	Friday, 29 August
Geelong	12.12 (84)	St Kilda	9.11 (65)	Skilled Stadium	20,728	Saturday, 30 August
Melbourne	9.6 (60)	Sydney	14.10 (94)	MCG	22,969	Saturday, 30 August
Western Bulldogs	13.8 (86)	Brisbane Lions	26.14 (170)	Telstra Dome	22,361	Saturday, 30 August
West Coast	11.16 (82)	Fremantle	14.12 (96)	Subiaco Oval	43,027	Saturday, 30 August
Port Adelaide	14.10 (94)	Adelaide	12.6 (78)	AAMI Stadium	48,131	Sunday, 31 August
Carlton	9.9 (63)	Kangaroos	28.19 (187)	Telstra Dome	26,138	Sunday, 31 August
Richmond	11.8 (74)	Hawthorn	11.12 (78)	MCG	31,389	Sunday, 31 August

== Ladder ==
2003 AFL ladder
Pos	Team	Pld	W	L	D	PF	PA	PP	Pts	
1	Port Adelaide	22	18	4	0	2229	1752	127.2	72	Finals series
2	Collingwood	22	15	7	0	2259	1858	121.6	60	Finals series
3	Brisbane Lions (P)	22	14	7	1	2295	1882	121.9	58	Finals series
4	Sydney	22	14	8	0	2142	1862	115.0	56	Finals series
5	Fremantle	22	14	8	0	2143	2078	103.1	56	Finals series
6	Adelaide	22	13	9	0	2114	1754	120.5	52	Finals series
7	West Coast	22	12	8	2	2326	1982	117.4	52	Finals series
8	Essendon	22	13	9	0	2190	1960	111.7	52	Finals series
9	Hawthorn	22	12	10	0	2011	1999	100.6	48	
10	Kangaroos	22	11	10	1	2185	2223	98.3	46	
11	St Kilda	22	11	11	0	2095	2187	95.8	44	
12	Geelong	22	7	14	1	1819	2025	89.8	30	
13	Richmond	22	7	15	0	1846	2078	88.8	28	
14	Melbourne	22	5	17	0	1899	2344	81.0	20	
15	Carlton	22	4	18	0	1784	2674	66.7	16	
16	Western Bulldogs	22	3	18	1	2014	2693	74.8	14	

Source: AFL ladder
Rules for classification: 1) points; 2) percentage; 3) number of points for.
(P) Premiers

=== Ladder progression ===
Numbers highlighted in green indicate that the team finished the round inside the top 8.
Numbers highlighted in blue indicates the team finished first on the ladder in that round.
Numbers highlighted in red indicates the team finished in last place on the ladder in that round.

Team ╲ Round	1	2	3	4	5	6	7	8	9	10	11	12	13	14	15	16	17	18	19	20	21	22
Port Adelaide	0	0	4	8	12	16	16	20	24	28	32	36	40	40	44	48	52	56	60	64	68	72
Collingwood	4	8	12	12	12	12	16	16	20	24	24	24	28	32	36	40	44	48	48	52	56	60
Brisbane Lions	4	8	10	14	18	22	22	26	30	34	34	34	38	38	42	42	42	46	50	50	54	58
Sydney	4	4	4	4	8	12	16	20	20	24	28	32	32	36	40	44	48	48	48	52	52	56
Fremantle	0	4	4	8	8	12	16	20	24	28	28	32	32	36	36	40	40	44	48	52	52	56
Adelaide	4	4	8	12	12	16	16	16	20	24	24	28	32	36	40	40	44	48	52	52	52	52
West Coast	4	4	8	8	12	16	20	24	28	28	30	34	38	38	42	42	46	46	46	48	52	52
Essendon	0	4	4	8	12	12	12	16	16	20	20	20	24	28	28	32	36	40	44	48	52	52
Hawthorn	0	4	4	8	8	12	12	12	12	12	16	20	24	28	28	32	32	32	36	40	44	48
North Melbourne	4	8	10	10	10	10	14	14	18	22	26	30	30	34	34	34	38	38	38	38	42	46
St Kilda	0	4	4	4	8	12	16	16	16	20	24	24	24	24	24	28	28	32	36	40	44	44
Geelong	0	0	0	4	4	4	4	4	8	8	12	12	12	16	20	20	20	20	24	26	26	30
Richmond	0	4	8	12	16	16	20	24	24	24	24	24	24	24	24	24	28	28	28	28	28	28
Melbourne	4	4	8	8	8	8	12	12	12	12	12	12	16	20	20	20	20	20	20	20	20	20
Carlton	0	0	4	4	8	8	8	12	12	12	12	16	16	16	16	16	16	16	16	16	16	16
Western Bulldogs	4	4	4	4	4	4	4	4	4	4	6	6	6	6	6	10	10	14	14	14	14	14

== Finals series ==
Qualifying and elimination finals
7 Sep, AAMI Stadium
1	Port Adelaide	13.10 (88)
4	Sydney	15.10 (100)
5 Sep, Subiaco Oval
5	Fremantle	8.9 (57)
8	Essendon	15.11 (101)
6 Sep, AAMI Stadium
6	Adelaide	16.17 (113)
7	West Coast	8.9 (57)
6 Sep, MCG
2	Collingwood	9.12 (66)
3	Brisbane Lions	7.9 (51)

Semi-finals
13 Sep, AAMI Stadium
Port Adelaide	12.11 (83)
Essendon	6.8 (44)
12 Sep, The Gabba
Brisbane Lions	18.16 (124)
Adelaide	12.10 (82)

Preliminary finals
20 Sep, Telstra Stadium
Sydney	8.8 (56)
Brisbane Lions	14.16 (100)
20 Sep, MCG
Collingwood	17.10 (112)
Port Adelaide	9.14 (68)

Grand final
27 Sep, MCG
Brisbane Lions	20.14 (134)
Collingwood	12.12 (84)

=== Week one ===
	Qualifying Finals
7 September (2:30 pm)	Port Adelaide 13.10 (88)	def. by	Sydney 15.10 (100)	AAMI Stadium (crowd: 33,968)
6 September (7:30 pm)	Collingwood 9.12 (66)	def.	Brisbane Lions 7.9 (51)	MCG (crowd: 66,092)

	Elimination Finals
5 September (6:40 pm)	Fremantle 8.9 (57)	def. by	Essendon 15.11 (101)	Subiaco Oval (crowd: 42,770)
6 September (2:30 pm)	Adelaide 16.17 (113)	def.	West Coast 8.9 (57)	AAMI Stadium (crowd: 38,641)

=== Week two ===
	Semi-finals
12 September (7:30 pm)	Brisbane Lions 18.16 (124)	def.	Adelaide 12.10 (82)	The Gabba (crowd: 32,432)
13 September (7:30 pm)	Port Adelaide 12.11 (83)	def.	Essendon 6.8 (44)	AAMI Stadium (crowd: 36,557)
No game was played at the MCG this week, despite the agreement then in place with the Melbourne Cricket Club that at least one game each week of the finals be played at the MCG. Neither match was considered a viable option to be moved, as one match featured two non-Victorian teams (Brisbane and Adelaide), and the other match featured a first-placed non-Victorian side (Port Adelaide) versus an eighth-placed Victorian side (Essendon).

=== Week three ===
	Preliminary Finals
20 September (2:30 pm)	Collingwood 17.10 (112)	def.	Port Adelaide 9.14 (68)	MCG (crowd: 77,405)
20 September (7:30 pm)	Sydney 8.8 (56)	def. by	Brisbane Lions 14.16 (100)	Telstra Stadium (crowd: 71,019)
The attendance of 71,019 for the final between Sydney and Brisbane is the largest attendance ever for an AFL game not featuring a Victorian team played outside Victoria.; As of 2025, this remains the last time two finals matches were played on the same day after the first week.

=== Week four ===
	Grand Final
27 September (2:40 pm)	Brisbane Lions 20.14 (134)	def.	Collingwood 12.12 (84)	MCG (crowd: 79,451)	Report
Brisbane's victory was the clubs third successive premiership and were the fourth team to achieve three or more premierships in a row.

== Match attendance ==
Total match attendance for all games was 5,872,352 people. Attendance at the grand final was 79,451 people. The largest non-finals attendance was 72,393 people for the Sydney vs Collingwood game in round 21.

== Awards ==
- The Brownlow Medal was awarded to Mark Ricciuto of Adelaide, Nathan Buckley of Collingwood, and Adam Goodes of Sydney.
- The Leigh Matthews Trophy was awarded to Michael Voss of the Brisbane Lions.
- The Coleman Medal was awarded to Matthew Lloyd of Essendon.
- The Norm Smith Medal was awarded to Simon Black of the Brisbane Lions.
- The AFL Rising Star award was awarded to Sam Mitchell of Hawthorn.
- The Wooden Spoon was "awarded" to the Western Bulldogs for coming last.

== Notable events ==
- Western Bulldogs captain Chris Grant suffered a season-ending knee injury in his side's round one win over Geelong. His absence in the team was severely felt as the Bulldogs ended up finishing last on the AFL ladder.
