= 2007 Brisbane Lions season =

Brisbane Lions
2007 season
- Coach: Leigh Matthews
- Captains: Jonathan Brown; Simon Black; Luke Power; Chris Johnson; Nigel Lappin
- Home ground: The Gabba (Capacity: 42,000)
- AFL season: 10th
- Best and fairest: Jonathan Brown
- Leading goalkicker: Jonathan Brown (77 goals)
- Highest home attendance: 34,107 vs. Geelong (1 September 2007)
- Lowest home attendance: 22,124 vs. Port Adelaide (30 June 2007)
- Average home attendance: 28,847
- Club membership: 23,072

The Brisbane Lions' 2007 season was its 11th season in the Australian Football League (AFL).

== Season summary ==
=== Premiership Season ===
==== Home and away season ====
| Rd | Date and local time | Opponent | Scores | | | Venue | Attendance |
| Rd | Date and local time | Opponent | Brisbane | Opponent | Result | Venue | Attendance |
| 1 | Saturday, 31 March (7:15 pm) | Hawthorn | 9.15 (69) | 6.8 (44) | Won by 25 points | The Gabba (H) | 27,104 |
| 2 | Thursday, 5 April (7:40 pm) | St Kilda | 15.12 (102) | 7.8 (50) | Won by 52 points | The Gabba (H) | 28,266 |
| 3 | Sunday, 15 April (1:10 pm) | Sydney | 10.9 (69) | 13.18 (96) | Lost by 27 points | SCG (A) | 24,854 |
| 4 | Saturday, 21 April (7:15 pm) | Kangaroos | 8.15 (63) | 12.15 (87) | Lost by 24 points | Carrara Stadium (A) | 11,133 |
| 5 | Saturday, 28 April (7:10 pm) | Carlton | 21.10 (136) | 18.16 (124) | Won by 12 points | Docklands Stadium (A) | 33,598 |
| 6 | Sunday, 6 May (1:10 pm) | Fremantle | 17.18 (120) | 10.15 (75) | Won by 45 points | The Gabba (H) | 27,175 |
| 7 | Saturday, 12 May (7:10 pm) | Adelaide | 9.15 (69) | 14.16 (100) | Lost by 31 points | The Gabba (H) | 26,978 |
| 8 | Saturday, 19 May (2:10 pm) | Essendon | 8.15 (63) | 18.19 (127) | Lost by 64 points | Docklands Stadium (A) | 35,034 |
| 9 | Saturday, 26 May (7:15 pm) | Collingwood | 13.9 (87) | 18.12 (120) | Lost by 33 points | The Gabba (H) | 32,225 |
| 10 | Saturday, 2 June (7:15 pm) | Richmond | 10.13 (73) | 10.13 (73) | Drew | Docklands Stadium (A) | 28,093 |
| 11 | Saturday, 9 June (7:15 pm) | Western Bulldogs | 10.12 (72) | 13.17 (95) | Lost by 23 points | The Gabba (H) | 29,873 |
| 12 | Sunday, 17 June (1:10 pm) | Geelong | 5.5 (35) | 12.13 (85) | Lost by 50 points | Kardinia Park (A) | 21,212 |
| 13 | Saturday, 30 June (7:15 pm) | Port Adelaide | 15.15 (105) | 17.10 (112) | Lost by 7 points | The Gabba (H) | 22,124 |
| 14 | Saturday, 7 July (5:40 pm) | West Coast | 13.13 (91) | 9.10 (64) | Won by 27 points | Subiaco Oval (A) | 40,763 |
| 15 | Saturday, 14 July (7:10 pm) | Melbourne | 18.18 (126) | 12.10 (82) | Won by 44 points | The Gabba (A) | 22,708 |
| 16 | Sunday, 22 July (1:10 pm) | Carlton | 25.13 (163) | 6.10 (46) | Won by 117 points | The Gabba (H) | 27,163 |
| 17 | Saturday, 28 July (7:10 pm) | Collingwood | 22.17 (149) | 7.14 (56) | Won by 93 points | MCG (A) | 45,096 |
| 18 | Saturday, 4 August (7:10 pm) | Kangaroos | 10.17 (77) | 5.10 (40) | Won by 37 points | The Gabba (H) | 29,233 |
| 19 | Saturday, 11 August (2:10 pm) | Hawthorn | 13.13 (91) | 17.13 (115) | Lost by 24 points | MCG (A) | 39,007 |
| 20 | Saturday, 18 August (7:10 pm) | Sydney | 9.9 (63) | 8.15 (63) | Drew | The Gabba (H) | 33,077 |
| 21 | Saturday, 25 August (7:10 pm) | Adelaide | 8.12 (60) | 12.14 (86) | Lost by 26 points | Football Park (A) | 46,507 |
| 22 | Saturday, 1 September (7:10 pm) | Geelong | 15.13 (103) | 22.13 (145) | Lost by 42 points | The Gabba (H) | 34,107 |

===== Round 1 =====
Round 1
Saturday, 31 March (7:15 pm) | Brisbane Lions | def. | Hawthorn | The Gabba (crowd: 27,104)
2.5 (17); 5.10 (40); 6.13 (49); 9.15 (69) | Q1; Q2; Q3; Final | 1.0 (6); 2.3 (15); 2.6 (18); 6.8 (44) | Umpires: Stefan Grun, Mathew Head, Troy Pannell; Television broadcast: Fox Sports
McGrath 3 Notting, Lappin, Stiller, Brown, Rischitelli, Sherman 1 | Goals | 3 Franklin; 2 Boyle; 1 Clarke
Black, Power, McGrath, Roe, Stiller, Adcock | Best | Franklin, Young, Jacobs, Bateman, Lewis, Boyle
Copeland (hip), Lappin (calf) | Injuries | Nil
Nil | Reports | Lewis on Stiller for charging
Ladder position: 1st

===== Round 2 =====
Round 2
Thursday, 5 April (7:40 pm) | Brisbane Lions | def. | St Kilda | The Gabba, Brisbane (crowd: 28,266)
2.4 (16); 7.7 (49); 11.11 (77); 15.12 (102) | Q1; Q2; Q3; Final | 2.3 (15); 3.4 (22); 6.6 (42); 7.8 (50) | Umpires: Vozzo, K Nicholls, Jeffery; Television broadcast: Seven Network
Brown 5 Sherman 3 Black, Patfull 2 McGrath, Stiller, Johnson 1 | Goals | 2 Fiora, Koschitzke; 1 Milne, Montagna, Birss
Rischitelli, Sherman, Stiller, Power, Black | Best | Fiora, Gram, Dal Santo, S Fisher
Nil | Injuries | Nil
Nil | Reports | Nil
Ladder position: 1st

===== Round 3 =====
Round 3
Sunday, 15 April (1:10 pm) | Sydney | def. | Brisbane Lions | SCG, Sydney (crowd: 24,854)
5.3 (33); 7.6 (48); 8.10 (58); 13.18 (96) | Q1; Q2; Q3; Final | 4.3 (27); 7.4 (46); 10.8 (68); 10.9 (69) | Umpires: Allen, Kamolins, Meredith; Television broadcast: Fox Sports
Hall 4 O'Loughlin 3 Schmidt 2 Schneider, Mathews, O'Keefe, Barry 1 | Goals | 3 Brown, McGrath; 1 Patfull, Begley, Fixter, Harding
Hall, Schneider, Buchanan, Fosdike, Jolly | Best | McGrath, Brown, Power, Black, Fixter
Nil | Injuries | Nil
Nil | Reports | Nil
Ladder position: 3rd

===== Round 4 =====
Round 4
Saturday, 21 April (7:15 pm) | Kangaroos | def. | Brisbane Lions | Carrara Stadium, Carrara (crowd: 11,133) | Report
5.4 (34); 6.6 (42); 7.13 (55); 12.15 (87) | Q1; Q2; Q3; Final | 1.6 (12); 5.9 (39); 6.13 (49); 8.15 (63) | Umpires: Stevic, Kamolins, K Nicholls; Television broadcast: Fox Sports
L. Brown 3 Wells 2 Thomas, Jones, Harris, Petrie, Harvey, McIntosh, Sinclair 1 | Goals | 2 Black, McGrath; 1 Harding, Johnson, Notting, Brown
Edwards, McIntosh, Rawlings, Wells, Archer | Best | Black, Notting, Power, McGrath, Brennan
Thomas (ribs) | Injuries | Lappin (quad) replaced in selected side by Moody
Nil | Reports | Nil
Ladder position: 7th

===== Round 5 =====
Round 5
Saturday, 28 April (7:10 pm) | Carlton | def. by | Brisbane Lions | Telstra Dome, Melbourne (crowd: 33,598)
5.6 (36); 14.8 (92); 17.11 (113); 18.16 (124) | Q1; Q2; Q3; Final | 6.1 (37); 13.1 (79); 18.4 (112); 21.10 (136) | Umpires: Donlon, James, Head; Television broadcast: Fox Sports
Simpson, Whitnall, Betts, Fevola, Cloke 3 Walker, Murphy, Lappin 1 | Goals | 3 Johnson, Brown, Charman; 2 Power, Notting, McGrath, Patfull; 1 Hadley, Roe, Stiller, Begley
Houlihan, Scotland, Whitnall, Lappin, Simpson, Betts | Best | Brown, Black, Power, Stiller, Notting, Charman, Johnson
Jackson (broken hand) | Injuries | Nil
Nil | Reports | Nil
Ladder position: 6th

===== Round 6 =====
Round 6
Sunday, 6 May (1:10 pm) | Brisbane Lions | def. | Fremantle | The Gabba, Brisbane (crowd: 27,175)
5.5 (35); 9.10 (64); 12.15 (87); 17.18 (120) | Q1; Q2; Q3; Final | 4.5 (29); 7.8 (50); 9.14 (68); 10.15 (75) | Umpires: James, M Nicholls, Wenn; Television broadcast: Fox Sports
McGrath 5 Johnson, Power, Sherman, Brown 2 Patfull, Begley, Stiller, Rischitelli 1 | Goals | 3 Pavlich, Tarrant; 1 Cook, Warnock, Headland, Bell
McGrath, Power, McDonald, Lappin, S Black | Best | Bell, Pavlich, H Black, J Carr, Mundy
Nil | Injuries | Nil
Johnson (Brisbane) reported by field umpire Wenn for allegedly headbutting Parker (Fremantle) in the second quarter | Reports | Grover (Fremantle) reported by field umpire M Nicholls for attempted trip on McGrath (Brisbane) in the third quarter.
Ladder position: 3rd

===== Round 7 =====
Round 7
Saturday, 12 May (7:10 pm) | Brisbane Lions | def. by | Adelaide | The Gabba, Brisbane (crowd: 26,978)
3.6 (24); 5.8 (38); 6.12 (48); 9.15 (69) | Q1; Q2; Q3; Final | 4.2 (26); 6.8 (44); 10.13 (73); 14.16 (100) | Umpires: Kamolins, Ellis, Jeffery; Television broadcast: Fox Sports
Notting, Brown 2 Charman, Johnson, McGrath, Harding, Rischitelli 1 | Goals | 3 Thompson, Welsh; 2 Goodwin; 1 Knights, Shirley, Perrie, Bock, Edwards, Griffin
Black, Rischitelli, Brennan, Adcock | Best | Goodwin, Edwards, Knights, Welsh, Thompson
Nil | Injuries | Nil
Nil | Reports | Nil
Ladder position: 6th

===== Round 8 =====
Round 8
Saturday, 19 May (2:10 pm) | Essendon | def. | Brisbane Lions | Telstra Dome, Melbourne (crowd: 35,034)
3.6 (24); 7.10 (52); 13.15 (93); 18.19 (127) | Q1; Q2; Q3; Final | 2.4 (16); 5.8 (38); 5.10 (40); 8.15 (63) | Umpires: Kennedy, Nicholls, Pannell; Television broadcast: Network Ten
Lloyd 4 Hird, Monfries, McVeigh, Houli 2 Watson, J Johnson, Hille, Stanton, Lucas, Davey 1 | Goals | 2 T Selwood; 1 Notting, McGrath, Brown, Patfull, Drummond, Begley
Hird, Watson, Fletcher, Hille, McVeigh, Monfries | Best | Black, T Selwood, Hadley, Lappin, Brown, Adcock
Nil | Injuries | Nil
Nil | Reports | Nil
Ladder position: 11th

== Ladder ==
2007 AFL ladder
| Pos | Team | Pld | W | L | D | PF | PA | PP | Pts | |
|---|---|---|---|---|---|---|---|---|---|---|
| 1 | Geelong (P) | 22 | 18 | 4 | 0 | 2542 | 1664 | 152.8 | 72 | Finals series |
| 2 | Port Adelaide | 22 | 15 | 7 | 0 | 2314 | 2038 | 113.5 | 60 | Finals series |
| 3 | West Coast | 22 | 15 | 7 | 0 | 2162 | 1935 | 111.7 | 60 | Finals series |
| 4 | Kangaroos | 22 | 14 | 8 | 0 | 2183 | 1998 | 109.3 | 56 | Finals series |
| 5 | Hawthorn | 22 | 13 | 9 | 0 | 2097 | 1855 | 113.0 | 52 | Finals series |
| 6 | Collingwood | 22 | 13 | 9 | 0 | 2011 | 1992 | 101.0 | 52 | Finals series |
| 7 | Sydney | 22 | 12 | 9 | 1 | 2031 | 1698 | 119.6 | 50 | Finals series |
| 8 | Adelaide | 22 | 12 | 10 | 0 | 1881 | 1712 | 109.9 | 48 | Finals series |
| 9 | St Kilda | 22 | 11 | 10 | 1 | 1874 | 1941 | 96.5 | 46 | |
| 10 | Brisbane Lions | 22 | 9 | 11 | 2 | 1986 | 1885 | 105.4 | 40 | |
| 11 | Fremantle | 22 | 10 | 12 | 0 | 2254 | 2198 | 102.5 | 40 | |
| 12 | Essendon | 22 | 10 | 12 | 0 | 2184 | 2394 | 91.2 | 40 | |
| 13 | Western Bulldogs | 22 | 9 | 12 | 1 | 2111 | 2469 | 85.5 | 38 | |
| 14 | Melbourne | 22 | 5 | 17 | 0 | 1890 | 2418 | 78.2 | 20 | |
| 15 | Carlton | 22 | 4 | 18 | 0 | 2167 | 2911 | 74.4 | 16 | |
| 16 | Richmond | 22 | 3 | 18 | 1 | 1958 | 2537 | 77.2 | 14 | |

Source: AFL ladder
Rules for classification: 1) points; 2) percentage; 3) number of points for.
(P) Premiers

== Gallery ==
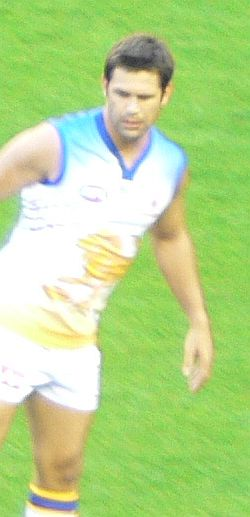
Chris Johnson during the 2007 NAB Cup Grand Final

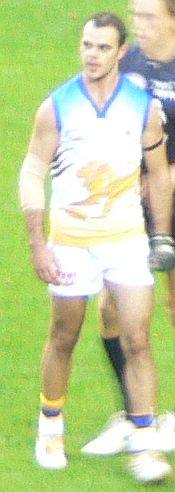
Ashley McGrath during the 2007 NAB Cup Grand Final

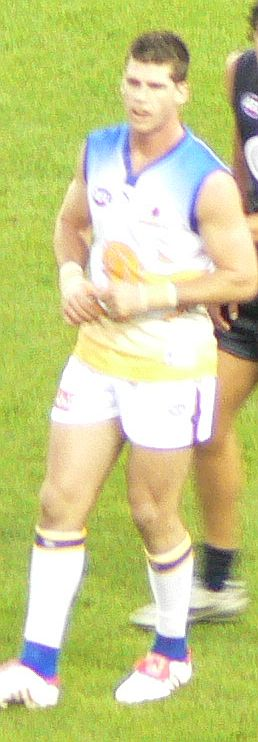
Jonathan Brown during the 2007 NAB Cup Grand Final

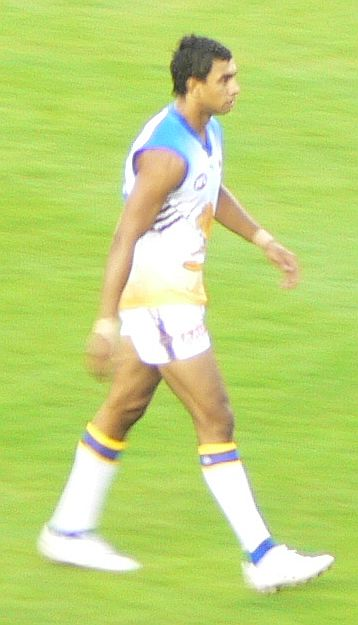
Jason Roe during the 2007 NAB Cup Grand Final

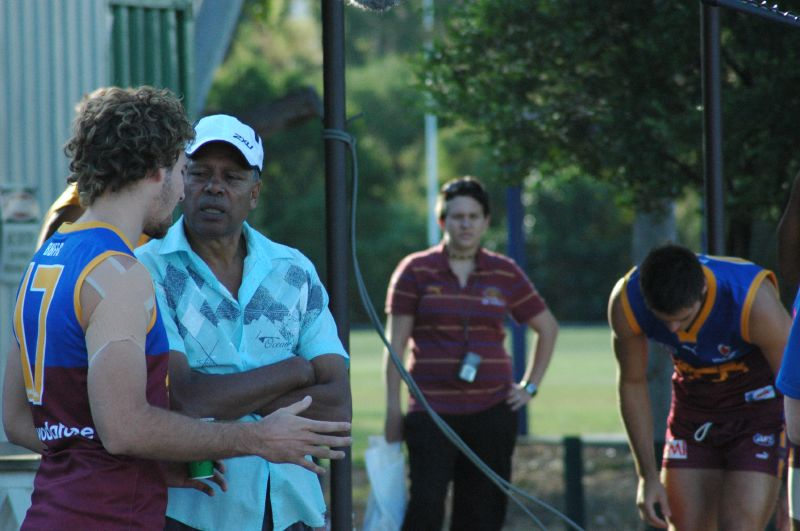
Jared Brennan and Ernie Dingo during a Brisbane Lions training session on April 11

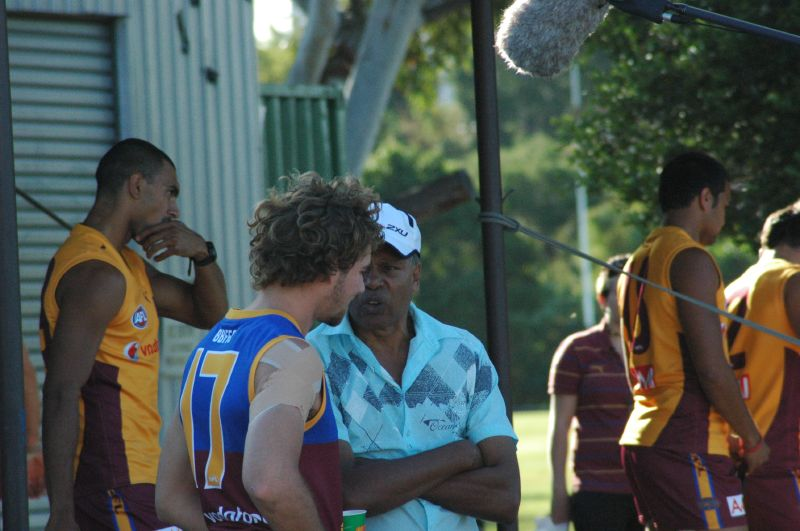
Jared Brennan and Ernie Dingo during a Brisbane Lions training session on April 11

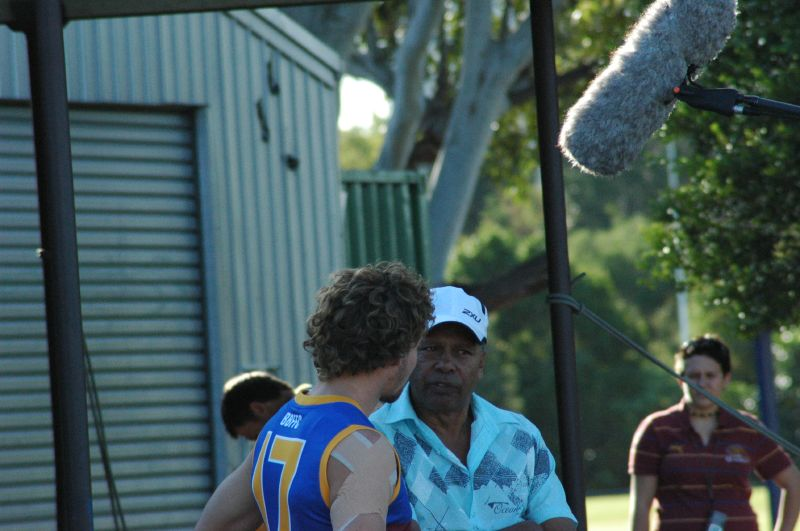
Jared Brennan and Ernie Dingo during a Brisbane Lions training session on April 11

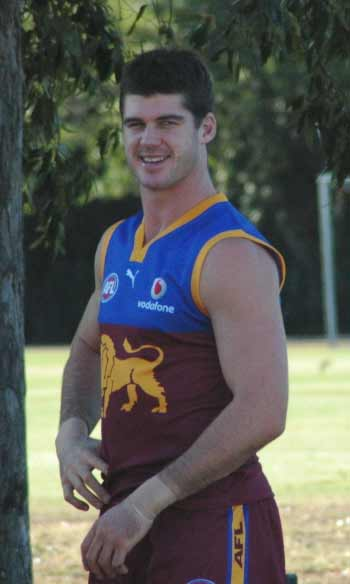
Jonathan Brown during a Brisbane Lions training session on May 8

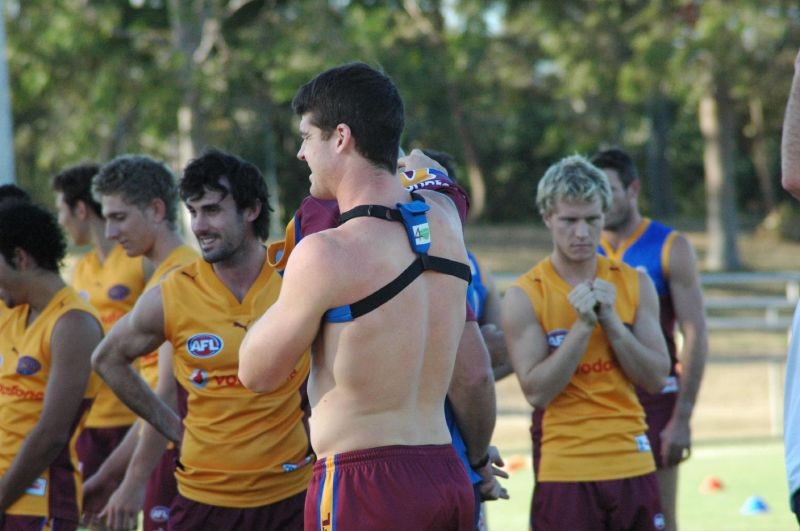
Jonathan Brown during a Brisbane Lions training session on May 8

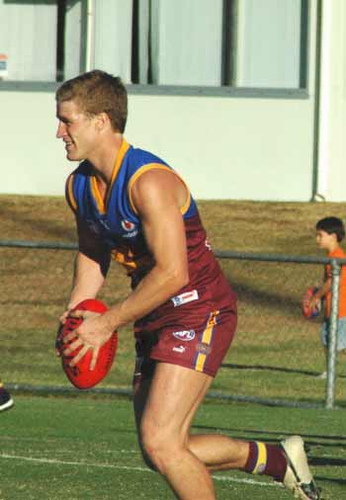
Luke Power during a Brisbane Lions training session on May 8

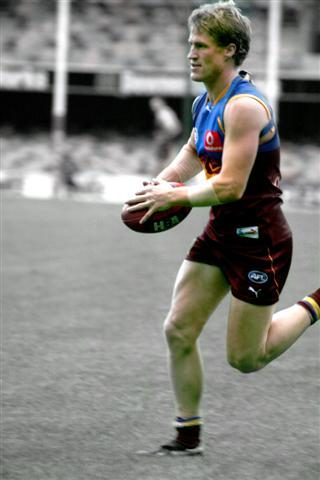
Luke Power during a Brisbane Lions training session

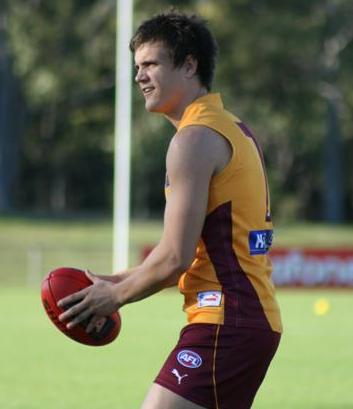
Jed Adcock during a Brisbane Lions training session

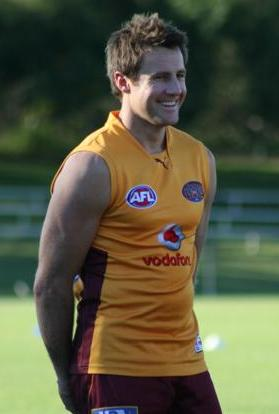
Tim Notting during a Brisbane Lions training session

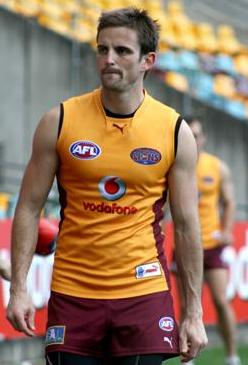
Josh Drummond during a Brisbane Lions training session

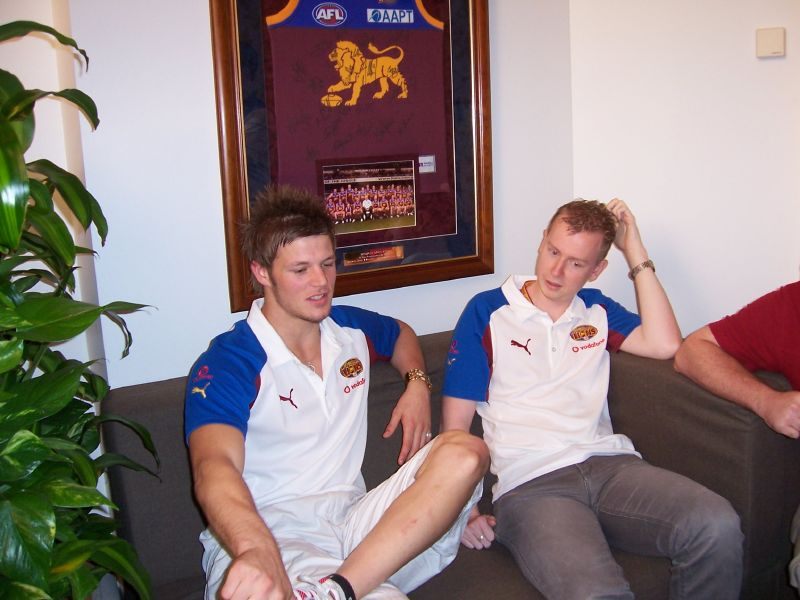
Justin Sherman at the players lounge

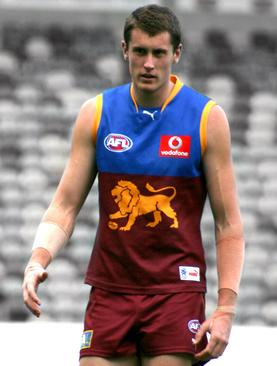
Matthew Leuenberger during a Brisbane Lions training session
