= 2007 NAB Cup =

- Season: 2007
- Teams: 16
- Winners: Carlton (4th title)
- Matches played: 15
- Attendance: 246,321 (average 16,421 per match)
- Michael Tuck Medallist: Nick Stevens (Carlton)

The 2007 NAB Cup was the pre-season competition of the Australian Football League's 2007 season. It culminated in the Grand Final on 17 March, which was won by Carlton.

== Prize money ==
- Winner: $220,000
- Runner-up: $110,000
- Round 3 losers: $55,000
- Round 2 losers: $27,000
- Round 1 losers: $16,500

$220,000 was awarded to the winning club (by comparison, the prize money for the winner of the 2005 AFL Grand Final was only slightly larger at $250,000). Smaller amounts were awarded to clubs based on participation and progression through the competition.

It was announced that if a club could win both the pre-season and regular premierships in the same season, that the club would receive a bonus $1 million. Half would be distributed among the players, while the other half would go to the club.

== Games ==
=== Round 1 ===
	Round 1
Friday, 23 February (7:40 pm)	Kangaroos 1.15.18 (117)	def.	Collingwood 1.8.9 (66)	Carrara Stadium (crowd: 11,341)	Report
Friday, 23 February (7:10 pm)	Port Adelaide 2.9.17 (89)	def.	Adelaide 2.10.8 (86)	AAMI Stadium (crowd: 16,355)	Report
Saturday, 24 February (3:40 pm)	Western Bulldogs 1.12.16 (97)	def.	Sydney 1.9.7 (70)	Manuka Oval (crowd: 5,567)	Report
Saturday, 24 February (6:10 pm)	Carlton 1.10.14 (83)	def.	Essendon 1.9.16 (79)	Telstra Dome (crowd: 28,658)	Report
Saturday, 24 February (7:40 pm)	St Kilda 1.5.6 (45)	def. by	Brisbane Lions 0.7.10 (52)	Cazaly's Stadium (crowd: 6,380)	Report
Sunday, 25 February (3:40 pm)	Geelong 3.17.10 (139)	def.	Richmond 1.14.3 (96)	Skilled Stadium (crowd: 15,000)	Report
Sunday, 25 February (6:10 pm)	Melbourne 2.9.14 (86)	def. by	Hawthorn 3.11.17 (110)	Telstra Dome (crowd: 14,000)	Report
Sunday, 25 February (6:40 pm)	Fremantle 4.11.10 (112)	def.	West Coast 0.10.15 (75)	Subiaco Oval (crowd: 39,027)	Report

=== Round 2 ===
	Round 2
Friday, 2 March (7:40 pm)	Brisbane Lions 2.12.12 (102)	def.	Western Bulldogs 2.7.10 (70)	Telstra Dome (crowd: 12,789)	Report
Saturday, 3 March (6:10 pm)	Hawthorn 2.7.8 (68)	def. by	Carlton 1.9.12 (75)	Aurora Stadium (crowd: 15,412)	Report
Saturday, 3 March (7:10 pm)	Geelong 0.9.6 (60)	def.	Port Adelaide 0.7.15 (57)	TIO Stadium (aet) (crowd: 4,804)	Report
Sunday, 4 March (3:40 pm)	Kangaroos 1.14.7 (100)	def.	Fremantle 0.13.13 (91)	Telstra Dome (crowd: 9,191)	Report

=== Round 3 ===
	Round 3
Friday, 9 March (7:40 pm)	Brisbane Lions 3.8.10 (85)	def.	Geelong 0.10.13 (73)	Telstra Dome (crowd: 14,475)	Report
Saturday, 10 March (7:10 pm)	Carlton 1.13.13 (100)	def.	Kangaroos 1.12.4 (85)	Carrara Stadium (crowd: 7,228)	Report

=== Grand Final ===
2007 NAB Cup Grand Final
Saturday, 17 March (7:20 pm)	Brisbane Lions	def. by	Carlton	Telstra Dome (crowd: 46,094)	Report
0.2.2 (14); 0.6.7 (43); 0.7.11 (53); 0.10.12 (72)	Q1; Q2; Q3; Final	1.2.1 (22); 1.4.3 (36); 2.9.3 (75); 2.12.7 (97)	Umpires: Stevic, Vozzo, Ryan, Jeffery; Michael Tuck Medal: Nick Stevens (Carlton); Television broadcast: Seven
Nil	Super Goals	Fisher, Carrazzo
Stiller 2, Johnson 2, Brown 2, Moody, Sherman, Wood, McGrath	Goals	Fevola 4, Fisher 3, Scotland, Koutoufides, Russell, Whitnall, Stevens
Black, Harding, Adcock, Stiller, Sherman, Fixter	Best	Stevens, Murphy, Thornton, Fisher, Ó hAilpín, Fevola
Nil	Injuries	Nil
Fixter for charging Murphy (Carlton) in the third quarter, Wood (Brisbane Lions) by umpire Jeffery for striking Ackland (Carlton) in the third quarter.	Reports	Nil

== Results ==
Round 1
St Kilda	1	5	6	45
Brisbane Lions	0	7	10	52
Western Bulldogs	1	12	16	97
Sydney	1	9	7	70
Geelong	3	23	10	175
Richmond	1	14	3	96
Port Adelaide	2	9	17	89
Adelaide	2	10	8	86
Melbourne	2	9	14	86
Hawthorn	3	11	17	110
Carlton	1	10	14	83
Essendon	1	9	16	79
Kangaroos	1	15	18	117
Collingwood	1	8	9	66
Fremantle	4	11	10	112
West Coast	0	10	15	75

Round 2
Brisbane Lions	2	12	12	102
Western Bulldogs	2	7	10	70
Geelong (aet)	0	9	6	60
Port Adelaide	0	7	15	57
Hawthorn	2	7	8	68
Carlton	1	9	12	75
Kangaroos	1	14	7	100
Fremantle	0	13	13	91

Round 3
Brisbane Lions	3	8	10	85
Geelong	0	10	13	73
Carlton	1	13	13	100
Kangaroos	1	12	4	85

Grand Final
Brisbane Lions	0	10	12	72
Carlton	2	12	7	97

== NAB Challenge ==
	Indigenous All-Stars match
Friday, 9 February (8:30pm)	Indigenous All-Stars 6.7 (43)	def. by	Essendon 14.9 (93)	TIO Stadium (crowd: 13,119)
All Stars co-captain Andrew McLeod was awarded the Graham 'Polly' Farmer medal for being the Indigenous All-Stars best on ground.

	Practice match
Friday, 16 February (7:00pm)	Sydney 10.6 (66)	def.	Collingwood 7.9 (51)	North Sydney Oval (crowd: 9,560)

	Week 1
Friday, 2 March (4:30pm)	Collingwood 15.10 (100)	def.	St Kilda 7.10 (52)	MC Labour Park (crowd: 4,000 est.)
Saturday, 3 March (1:00pm)	Sydney 13.7 (85)	def.	Richmond 10.6 (66)	Manuka Oval (crowd: 3,365)
Saturday, 3 March (3:30pm)	Adelaide 14.16 (100)	def.	Melbourne 6.8 (44)	Blue Lake Sports Park (crowd: 5,000 est.)
Saturday, 3 March (5:40pm)	West Coast 5.12 (42)	def. by	Essendon 15.10 (100)	Subiaco Oval (crowd: 11,012)

	Week 2
Friday, 9 March (7:00pm)	Sydney 19.9 (123)	def.	Collingwood 10.7 (67)	Narrandera Sportsground (crowd: 10,979)
Friday, 9 March (7:00pm)	Port Adelaide 21.14 (140)	def.	St Kilda 12.11 (83)	AAMI Stadium (crowd: 4,424)
Friday, 9 March (7:00pm)	Adelaide 11.11 (77)	def. by	West Coast 12.12 (84)	Traeger Park (crowd: 11,000 est.)
Saturday, 10 March (2:00pm)	Melbourne 15.13 (103)	def.	Richmond 10.15 (75)	MC Labour Park (crowd: 2,000 est.)
Saturday, 10 March (2:00pm)	Essendon 15.13 (91)	def. by	Western Bulldogs 15.12 (102)	Skilled Stadium (crowd: 4,000 est.)
Saturday, 10 March (5:40pm)	Fremantle 12.12 (84)	def.	Hawthorn 9.9 (63)	Subiaco Oval (crowd: 6,321)

	Week 3
Friday, 16 March (4:30pm)	Kangaroos 9.8 (62)	def. by	St Kilda 10.13 (73)	MC Labour Park (crowd: 1,500 est.)
Friday, 16 March (4:30pm)	Richmond 10.12 (72)	def.	Collingwood 9.11 (65)	Red Cliffs Oval (crowd: 10,733)
Friday, 16 March (7:00pm)	Sydney 14.8 (92)	def. by	Port Adelaide 14.13 (97)	ANZ Stadium (crowd: 3,013)
Friday, 16 March (7:30pm)	Adelaide 7.16 (58)	def. by	Fremantle 12.11 (83)	AAMI Stadium (crowd: 5,278)
Saturday, 17 March (2:00pm)	Hawthorn 10.15 (75)	def.	Essendon 9.11 (65)	Casey Fields (crowd: 10,099)
Saturday, 17 March (2:00pm)	Geelong 11.13 (79)	def.	Melbourne 7.12 (54)	Skilled Stadium (crowd: 2,500 est.)
Saturday, 17 March (7:40pm)	West Coast 15.6 (96)	def.	Western Bulldogs 11.10 (76)	Subiaco Oval (crowd: 6,873)

== See also ==
- 2007 AFL season
