= 2007 AFL season =

18th season of the Australian Football League (AFL)

2007 AFL premiership season
- Teams: 16
- Premiers: Geelong; 7th premiership
- Minor premiers: Geelong; 12th minor premiership
- Pre-season cup: Carlton; 3rd pre-season cup win
- Brownlow Medallist: Jimmy Bartel; Geelong (29 votes)
- Coleman Medallist: Jonathan Brown (Brisbane Lions)

Attendance
- Matches played: 185
- Total attendance: 7,049,945 (38,108 per match)
- Highest: 98,002 (First Preliminary Final, Geelong vs. Collingwood)

The 2007 AFL season was the 111th season of the Australian Football League (AFL), the highest level senior Australian rules football competition in Australia, which was known as the Victorian Football League until 1989. The season featured sixteen clubs, ran from 30 March until 29 September, and comprised a 22-game home-and-away season followed by a finals series featuring the top eight clubs.

The premiership was won by the Geelong Football Club for the seventh time, after it defeated Port Adelaide by a record 119 points in the AFL Grand Final.

== Pre-season competition ==
Round One
St Kilda	1	5	6	45
Brisbane Lions	0	7	10	52
Western Bulldogs	1	12	16	97
Sydney	1	9	7	70
Geelong	3	17	10	139
Richmond	1	14	3	96
Port Adelaide	2	9	17	89
Adelaide	2	10	8	86
Melbourne	2	9	14	86
Hawthorn	3	11	17	110
Carlton	1	10	14	83
Essendon	1	9	16	79
Kangaroos	1	15	18	117
Collingwood	1	8	9	66
Fremantle	4	11	10	112
West Coast	0	10	15	75

Quarterfinals
Brisbane Lions	2	12	12	102
Western Bulldogs	2	7	10	70
Geelong (aet)	0	9	6	60
Port Adelaide	0	7	15	57
Hawthorn	2	7	8	68
Carlton	1	9	12	75
Kangaroos	1	14	7	100
Fremantle	0	13	13	91

Semifinals
Brisbane Lions	3	8	10	85
Geelong	0	10	13	73
Carlton	1	13	13	100
Kangaroos	1	12	4	85

Final
Brisbane Lions	0	10	12	72
Carlton	2	12	7	97

	2007 NAB Cup Grand Final
Saturday, 17 March (7:20 pm)	Brisbane Lions 0.10.12 (72)	def. by	Carlton 2.12.7 (97)	Telstra Dome (crowd: 46,094)	Report

== Home-and-away season ==
=== Round 1 ===
	Round 1
Friday, 30 March (7:40 pm)	Melbourne 9.8 (62)	def. by	St Kilda 13.15 (93)	MCG (crowd: 49,490)
Saturday, 31 March (2:10 pm)	Kangaroos 10.19 (79)	def. by	Collingwood 12.10 (82)	MCG (crowd: 42,402)
Saturday, 31 March (2:10 pm)	Fremantle 16.9 (105)	def. by	Port Adelaide 19.7 (121)	Subiaco Oval (crowd: 37,425)
Saturday, 31 March (7:15 pm)	Brisbane Lions 9.15 (69)	def.	Hawthorn 6.8 (44)	The Gabba (crowd: 27,104)
Saturday, 31 March (7:15 pm)	Sydney 10.13 (73)	def. by	West Coast 11.8 (74)	Telstra Stadium (crowd: 62,586)
Sunday, 1 April (12:40 pm)	Adelaide 10.14 (74)	def. by	Essendon 16.9 (105)	AAMI Stadium (crowd: 43,064)
Sunday, 1 April (2:10 pm)	Western Bulldogs 17.11 (113)	def.	Geelong 13.15 (93)	Telstra Dome (crowd: 42,626)
Sunday, 1 April (5:10 pm)	Carlton 15.25 (115)	def.	Richmond 15.8 (98)	MCG (crowd: 59,847)
The match between Sydney and West Coast was, and remains the highest attended home and away match ever that did not feature a Victorian team.

=== Round 2 ===
	Round 2 (Easter Round)
Thursday, 5 April (7:40 pm)	Brisbane Lions 15.12 (102)	def.	St Kilda 7.8 (50)	The Gabba (crowd: 28,266)
Saturday, 7 April (2:10 pm)	Richmond 11.6 (72)	def. by	Sydney 13.10 (88)	MCG (crowd: 37,985)
Saturday, 7 April (7:10 pm)	Geelong 24.18 (162)	def.	Carlton 12.12 (84)	Telstra Dome (crowd: 41,113)
Saturday, 7 April (5:40 pm)	West Coast 12.15 (87)	def.	Collingwood 11.9 (75)	Subiaco Oval (crowd: 40,413)
Sunday, 8 April (12:40 pm)	Port Adelaide 17.20 (122)	def.	Kangaroos 15.14 (104)	AAMI Stadium (crowd: 25,054)
Sunday, 8 April (2:10 pm)	Essendon 19.8 (122)	def.	Fremantle 17.10 (112)	Telstra Dome (crowd: 32,623)
Sunday, 8 April (5:10 pm)	Western Bulldogs 11.6 (72)	def. by	Adelaide 16.14 (110)	MCG (crowd: 27,199)
Monday, 9 April (2:10 pm)	Hawthorn 17.14 (116)	def.	Melbourne 14.10 (94)	MCG (crowd: 43,197)

=== Round 3 ===
	Round 3 (Rivalry Round)
Friday, 13 April (7:40 pm)	Collingwood 17.13 (115)	def.	Richmond 13.12 (90)	MCG (crowd: 70,569)
Saturday, 14 April (2:10 pm)	Carlton 18.17 (125)	def.	Essendon 17.20 (122)	MCG (crowd: 64,710)
Saturday, 14 April (2:40 pm)	Port Adelaide 8.15 (63)	def. by	Adelaide 13.9 (87)	AAMI Stadium (crowd: 36,959)
Saturday, 14 April (7:10 pm)	St Kilda 17.14 (116)	def.	Western Bulldogs 9.12 (66)	Telstra Dome (crowd: 38,474)
Saturday, 14 April (5:40 pm)	Fremantle 11.4 (70)	def. by	West Coast 14.17 (101)	Subiaco Oval (crowd: 42,051)
Sunday, 13 April (1:10 pm)	Sydney 13.18 (96)	def.	Brisbane Lions 10.9 (69)	SCG (crowd: 24,854)
Sunday, 13 April (2:10 pm)	Melbourne 8.9 (57)	def. by	Geelong 15.19 (109)	MCG (crowd: 38,438)
Sunday, 14 April (5:10 pm)	Kangaroos 10.10 (70)	def. by	Hawthorn 13.13 (91)	Telstra Dome (crowd: 28,481)

=== Round 4 ===
	Round 4
Friday, 20 April (7:40 pm)	Richmond 14.16 (100)	def. by	Western Bulldogs 20.12 (132)	MCG (crowd: 36,821)
Saturday, 21 April (2:10 pm)	Collingwood 9.12 (66)	def. by	Port Adelaide 12.12 (84)	MCG (crowd: 35,355)
Saturday, 21 April (2:10 pm)	St Kilda 9.14 (68)	def. by	Essendon 15.9 (99)	Telstra Dome (crowd: 47,605)
Saturday, 21 April (7:15 pm)	Kangaroos 12.15 (87)	def.	Brisbane Lions 8.15 (63)	Carrara Stadium (crowd: 11,133)
Saturday, 21 April (7:10 pm)	Adelaide 9.7 (61)	def.	Sydney 5.14 (44)	AAMI Stadium (crowd: 43,752)
Sunday, 22 April (1:10 pm)	Hawthorn 10.16 (76)	def.	Geelong 9.18 (72)	Aurora Stadium (crowd: 17,120)
Sunday, 22 April (2:10 pm)	Melbourne 13.14 (92)	def. by	Fremantle 21.11 (137)	MCG (crowd: 16,654)
Sunday, 22 April (2:40 pm)	West Coast 14.16 (100)	def.	Carlton 4.15 (39)	Subiaco Oval (crowd: 41,016)

=== Round 5 ===
	Round 5 (ANZAC Round)
Wednesday, 25 April (2:40 pm)	Essendon 11.13 (79)	def. by	Collingwood 12.23 (95)	MCG (crowd: 90,508)
Friday, 27 April (7:10 pm)	Port Adelaide 14.12 (96)	def.	St Kilda 6.7 (43)	AAMI Stadium (crowd: 24,438)
Saturday, 28 April (2:10 pm)	Richmond 11.10 (76)	def. by	West Coast 14.15 (99)	MCG (crowd: 27,326)
Saturday, 28 April (7:10 pm)	Carlton 18.16 (124)	def. by	Brisbane Lions 21.10 (136)	Telstra Dome (crowd: 33,598)
Saturday, 28 April (7:10 pm)	Sydney 17.7 (109)	def.	Melbourne 8.12 (60)	SCG (crowd: 23,354)
Sunday, 29 April (1:10 pm)	Hawthorn 13.15 (93)	def. by	Western Bulldogs 16.14 (110)	MCG (crowd: 31,982)
Sunday, 29 April (2:15 pm)	Geelong 15.12 (102)	def. by	Kangaroos 18.10 (118)	Skilled Stadium (crowd: 20,906)
Sunday, 29 April (2:45 pm)	Fremantle 7.16 (58)	def.	Adelaide 8.9 (57)	Subiaco Oval (crowd: 37,172)

=== Round 6 ===
	Round 6
Friday, 4 May (7:40 pm)	St Kilda 18.17 (125)	def.	Carlton 11.16 (82)	Telstra Dome (crowd: 45,513)
Saturday, 5 May (2:10 pm)	Essendon 15.6 (96)	def. by	Hawthorn 20.11 (131)	MCG (crowd: 52,047)
Saturday, 5 May (2:10 pm)	West Coast 10.17 (77)	def.	Western Bulldogs 9.8 (62)	Subiaco Oval (crowd: 40,668)
Saturday, 5 May (7:10 pm)	Kangaroos 16.15 (111)	def.	Sydney 14.11 (95)	Telstra Dome (crowd: 27,045)
Saturday, 5 May (7:10 pm)	Adelaide 9.8 (62)	def. by	Collingwood 11.20 (86)	AAMI Stadium (crowd: 43,915)
Sunday, 6 May (1:10 pm)	Brisbane Lions 17.18 (120)	def.	Fremantle 10.15 (75)	The Gabba (crowd: 27,175)
Sunday, 6 May (2:10 pm)	Melbourne 9.17 (71)	def. by	Port Adelaide 10.16 (76)	MCG (crowd: 16,266)
Sunday, 6 May (5:10 pm)	Richmond 9.11 (65)	def. by	Geelong 35.12 (222)	Telstra Dome (crowd: 34,584)
Richmond‘s heavy defeat of 157 points vs Geelong was its biggest loss in the club's history while Geelong’s score of 35.12 (222) was also the highest score Richmond has conceded.

=== Round 7 ===
	Round 7
Friday, 11 May (7:40 pm)	Kangaroos 18.9 (117)	def.	Essendon 13.17 (95)	Telstra Dome (crowd: 42,730)
Saturday, 12 May (2:10 pm)	Collingwood 17.17 (119)	def.	Carlton 14.11 (95)	MCG (crowd: 77,321)
Saturday, 12 May (2:40 pm)	Port Adelaide 16.19 (115)	def.	Richmond 10.15 (75)	AAMI Stadium (crowd: 26,232)
Saturday, 12 May (7:10 pm)	Brisbane Lions 9.15 (69)	def. by	Adelaide 14.16 (100)	The Gabba (crowd: 26,978)
Saturday, 12 May (7:10 pm)	St Kilda 15.7 (97)	def.	Sydney 11.5 (71)	Telstra Dome (crowd: 37,816)
Sunday, 13 May (1:10 pm)	Geelong 16.13 (109)	def.	West Coast 10.10 (70)	Skilled Stadium (crowd: 22,014)
Sunday, 13 May (2:10 pm)	Western Bulldogs 16.16 (112)	def.	Melbourne 16.10 (106)	Telstra Dome (crowd: 24,584)
Sunday, 13 May (2:40 pm)	Fremantle 14.12 (96)	def.	Hawthorn 11.14 (80)	Subiaco Oval (crowd: 36,481)

=== Round 8 ===
	Round 8
Friday, 18 May (7:10 pm)	Adelaide 14.15 (99)	def.	Richmond 14.6 (90)	AAMI Stadium (crowd: 40,742)
Saturday, 19 May (2:10 pm)	Essendon 18.19 (127)	def.	Brisbane Lions 8.15 (63)	Telstra Dome (crowd: 35,034)
Saturday, 19 May (2:10 pm)	Geelong 14.10 (94)	def.	Fremantle 10.9 (69)	Skilled Stadium (crowd: 20,435)
Saturday, 19 May (7:10 pm)	Hawthorn 10.12 (72)	def.	St Kilda 6.8 (44)	MCG (crowd: 36,063)
Saturday, 19 May (7:10 pm)	Kangaroos 22.15 (147)	def.	Carlton 20.10 (130)	Carrara Stadium (crowd: 11,649)
Sunday, 20 May (1:10 pm)	Sydney 17.16 (118)	def.	Port Adelaide 13.9 (87)	SCG (crowd: 25,423)
Sunday, 20 May (2:10 pm)	Western Bulldogs 20.15 (135)	def.	Collingwood 14.18 (102)	Telstra Dome (crowd: 46,990)
Sunday, 20 May (2:40 pm)	West Coast 19.23 (137)	def.	Melbourne 9.6 (60)	Subiaco Oval (crowd: 40,068)

=== Round 9 ===
	Round 9 (Indigenous Round)
Friday, 25 May (6:40 pm)	Fremantle 15.11 (101)	def.	St Kilda 6.19 (55)	Subiaco Oval (crowd: 39,034)
Saturday, 26 May (2:10 pm)	Carlton 12.14 (86)	def. by	Adelaide 15.15 (105)	Telstra Dome (crowd: 27,504)
Saturday, 26 May (2:10 pm)	Hawthorn 15.9 (99)	def.	West Coast 8.16 (64)	Aurora Stadium (crowd: 18,112)
Saturday, 26 May (7:15 pm)	Brisbane Lions 13.9 (87)	def. by	Collingwood 18.12 (120)	The Gabba (crowd: 32,225)
Saturday, 26 May (7:40 pm)	Richmond 12.12 (84)	def. by	Essendon 12.20 (92)	MCG (crowd: 61,837)
Sunday, 27 May (1:10 pm)	Western Bulldogs 8.9 (57)	def. by	Sydney 15.10 (100)	Manuka Oval (crowd: 14,517)
Sunday, 27 May (2:10 pm)	Melbourne 11.12 (78)	def. by	Kangaroos 10.19 (79)	MCG (crowd: 30,662)
Sunday, 27 May (4:10 pm)	Port Adelaide 8.12 (60)	def. by	Geelong 16.20 (116)	AAMI Stadium (crowd: 26,465)

=== Round 10 ===
	Round 10
Friday, 1 June (7:40 pm)	Collingwood 15.13 (103)	def.	Fremantle 13.16 (94)	MCG (crowd: 44,480)
Saturday, 2 June (2:10 pm)	Melbourne 13.11 (89)	def.	Adelaide 10.12 (72)	MCG (crowd: 23,657)
Saturday, 2 June (2:10 pm)	West Coast 18.13 (121)	def.	Kangaroos 7.13 (55)	Subiaco Oval (crowd: 40,751)
Saturday, 2 June (7:15 pm)	Richmond 10.13 (73)	drew with	Brisbane Lions 10.13 (73)	Telstra Dome (crowd: 28,093)
Saturday, 2 June (7:15 pm)	Sydney 11.7 (73)	def. by	Essendon 11.8 (74)	SCG (crowd: 26,647)
Sunday, 3 June (12:40 pm)	Port Adelaide 10.15 (75)	def. by	Hawthorn 17.7 (109)	AAMI Stadium (crowd: 23,945)
Sunday, 3 June (2:10 pm)	Carlton 21.12 (138)	def.	Western Bulldogs 19.14 (128)	MCG (crowd: 37,535)
Sunday, 3 June (5:10 pm)	St Kilda 9.11 (65)	def. by	Geelong 19.11 (125)	Telstra Dome (crowd: 42,188)

=== Round 11 ===
	Round 11
Friday, 8 June (7:40 pm)	Essendon 15.5 (95)	def.	West Coast 14.10 (94)	Telstra Dome (crowd: 48,913)
Saturday, 9 June (2:10 pm)	Hawthorn 9.12 (66)	def. by	Sydney 11.9 (75)	MCG (crowd: 48,398)
Saturday, 9 June (7:15 pm)	Brisbane Lions 10.12 (72)	def. by	Western Bulldogs 13.17 (95)	The Gabba (crowd: 29,873)
Saturday, 9 June (7:15 pm)	Carlton 22.9 (141)	def.	Port Adelaide 14.18 (102)	Telstra Dome (crowd: 29,678)
Sunday, 10 June (12:40 pm)	Adelaide 9.8 (62)	def. by	Geelong 9.15 (69)	AAMI Stadium (crowd: 43,108)
Sunday, 10 June (2:10 pm)	St Kilda 8.10 (58)	def. by	Kangaroos 11.14 (80)	Telstra Dome (crowd: 34,569)
Sunday, 10 June (2:40 pm)	Fremantle 18.15 (123)	def.	Richmond 15.12 (102)	Subiaco Oval (crowd: 37,177)
Monday, 11 June (2:15 pm)	Melbourne 13.16 (94)	def.	Collingwood 11.15 (81)	MCG (crowd: 70,660)

=== Round 12 ===
	Round 12 (Split Round)
Friday, 15 June (7:40 pm)	Carlton 12.8 (80)	def. by	Hawthorn 27.18 (180)	Telstra Dome (crowd: 53,459)
Saturday, 16 June (7:15 pm)	Kangaroos 7.12 (54)	def. by	Adelaide 15.10 (100)	Carrara Stadium (crowd: 11,178)
Saturday, 16 June (7:10 pm)	Western Bulldogs 22.9 (141)	def.	Fremantle 16.19 (115)	TIO Stadium (crowd: 11,449)
Sunday, 17 June (1:10 pm)	Geelong 12.13 (85)	def.	Brisbane Lions 5.5 (35)	Skilled Stadium (crowd: 21,212)
Sunday, 17 June (4:10 pm)	Port Adelaide 19.12 (126)	def.	Essendon 13.17 (95)	AAMI Stadium (crowd: 25,242)
Friday, 22 June (7:40 pm)	Richmond 18.16 (124)	def.	Melbourne 11.9 (75)	MCG (crowd: 46,161)
Saturday, 23 June (7:15 pm)	Sydney 8.9 (57)	def. by	Collingwood 10.16 (76)	Telstra Stadium (crowd: 64,222)
Sunday, 24 June (2:40 pm)	West Coast 11.10 (76)	def. by	St Kilda 15.9 (99)	Subiaco Oval (crowd: 39,401)

=== Round 13 ===
	Round 13
Friday, 29 June (7:40 pm)	Essendon 19.11 (125)	def.	Melbourne 18.15 (123)	Telstra Dome (crowd: 47,552)
Saturday, 30 June (2:10 pm)	Geelong 13.9 (87)	def.	Sydney 10.9 (69)	Skilled Stadium (crowd: 23,040)
Saturday, 30 June (2:10 pm)	Fremantle 27.11 (173)	def.	Carlton 13.18 (96)	Subiaco Oval (crowd: 36,307)
Saturday, 30 June (7:15 pm)	Brisbane Lions 15.15 (105)	def. by	Port Adelaide 17.10 (112)	The Gabba (crowd: 22,124)
Saturday, 30 June (7:15 pm)	St Kilda 17.15 (117)	def.	Richmond 15.10 (100)	Telstra Dome (crowd: 38,689)
Sunday, 1 July (12:40 pm)	Adelaide 10.14 (74)	def. by	West Coast 14.11 (95)	AAMI Stadium (crowd: 42,127)
Sunday, 1 July (2:10 pm)	Kangaroos 17.9 (111)	def.	Western Bulldogs 11.19 (85)	MCG (crowd: 39,433)
Sunday, 1 July (5:10 pm)	Collingwood 12.15 (87)	def. by	Hawthorn 15.5 (95)	Telstra Dome (crowd: 50,248)

=== Round 14 ===
	Round 14 (Heritage Round)
Friday, 6 July (7:40 pm)	Essendon 12.11 (83)	def. by	Geelong 19.19 (133)	Telstra Dome (crowd: 51,156)
Saturday, 7 July (2:10 pm)	Collingwood 12.17 (89)	def.	St Kilda 12.8 (80)	MCG (crowd: 57,247)
Saturday, 7 July (2:10 pm)	Western Bulldogs 20.13 (133)	def.	Port Adelaide 17.11 (113)	Telstra Dome (crowd: 22,691)
Saturday, 7 July (7:10 pm)	Adelaide 15.12 (102)	def.	Hawthorn 4.7 (31)	AAMI Stadium (crowd: 34,733)
Saturday, 7 July (5:40 pm)	West Coast 9.10 (64)	def. by	Brisbane Lions 13.13 (91)	Subiaco Oval (crowd: 40,763)
Sunday, 8 July (1:10 pm)	Sydney 11.23 (89)	def.	Fremantle 9.7 (61)	SCG (crowd: 25,493)
Sunday, 8 July (2:10 pm)	Carlton 14.17 (101)	def. by	Melbourne 19.10 (124)	MCG (crowd: 33,085)
Sunday, 8 July (5:10 pm)	Richmond 11.13 (79)	def. by	Kangaroos 14.20 (104)	Telstra Dome (crowd: 33,583)

=== Round 15 ===
	Round 15
Friday, 13 July (7:40 pm)	St Kilda 11.16 (82)	def.	Adelaide 12.8 (80)	Telstra Dome (crowd: 32,210)
Saturday, 14 July (2:10 pm)	Geelong 11.14 (80)	def.	Collingwood 9.10 (64)	MCG (crowd: 85,497)
Saturday, 14 July (2:40 pm)	Port Adelaide 22.21 (153)	def.	West Coast 9.8 (62)	AAMI Stadium (crowd: 27,879)
Saturday, 14 July (7:10 pm)	Essendon 14.14 (98)	def. by	Western Bulldogs 20.11 (131)	Telstra Dome (crowd: 45,283)
Saturday, 14 July (7:10 pm)	Melbourne 12.10 (82)	def. by	Brisbane Lions 18.18 (126)	The Gabba (crowd: 22,708)
Sunday, 15 July (1:10 pm)	Sydney 25.12 (162)	def.	Carlton 15.10 (100)	SCG (crowd: 24,858)
Sunday, 15 July (2:10 pm)	Hawthorn 19.15 (129)	def.	Richmond 11.10 (76)	MCG (crowd: 41,770)
Sunday, 15 July (2:40 pm)	Fremantle 11.12 (78)	def. by	Kangaroos 12.10 (82)	Subiaco Oval (crowd: 37,002)

=== Round 16 ===
	Round 16
Friday, 20 July (7:40 pm)	Geelong 20.18 (138)	def.	Western Bulldogs 9.9 (63)	Telstra Dome (crowd: 44,688)
Saturday, 21 July (2:10 pm)	Collingwood 18.14 (122)	def.	Essendon 14.9 (93)	MCG (crowd: 65,531)
Saturday, 21 July (2:40 pm)	Adelaide 15.11 (101)	def. by	Fremantle 20.6 (126)	AAMI Stadium (crowd: 40,190)
Saturday, 21 July (7:10 pm)	St Kilda 14.11 (95)	def.	Hawthorn 11.12 (78)	Telstra Dome (crowd: 37,847)
Saturday, 21 July (5:40 pm)	West Coast 16.16 (112)	def.	Sydney 15.10 (100)	Subiaco Oval (crowd: 40,014)
Sunday, 22 July (1:10 pm)	Brisbane Lions 25.13 (163)	def.	Carlton 6.10 (46)	The Gabba (crowd: 27,163)
Sunday, 22 July (2:10 pm)	Richmond 15.10 (100)	def. by	Port Adelaide 24.11 (155)	MCG (crowd: 22,395)
Sunday, 22 July (5:10 pm)	Kangaroos 19.12 (126)	def.	Melbourne 9.8 (62)	Telstra Dome (crowd: 20,187)

=== Round 17 ===
	Round 17
Friday, 27 July (7:40 pm)	Western Bulldogs 9.17 (71)	def. by	West Coast 24.14 (158)	Telstra Dome (crowd: 30,900)
Saturday, 28 July (2:10 pm)	Carlton 15.11 (101)	def. by	St Kilda 16.15 (111)	Telstra Dome (crowd: 32,327)
Saturday, 28 July (2:10 pm)	Fremantle 10.12 (72)	def. by	Geelong 20.20 (140)	Subiaco Oval (crowd: 36,741)
Saturday, 28 July (7:10 pm)	Collingwood 7.14 (56)	def. by	Brisbane Lions 22.17 (149)	MCG (crowd: 45,096)
Saturday, 28 July (7:10 pm)	Sydney 21.12 (138)	def.	Richmond 10.12 (72)	SCG (crowd: 23,199)
Sunday, 29 July (1:10 pm)	Hawthorn 10.11 (71)	def. by	Kangaroos 16.12 (108)	Aurora Stadium (crowd: 19,144)
Sunday, 29 July (2:10 pm)	Essendon 18.9 (117)	def.	Adelaide 16.9 (105)	Telstra Dome (crowd: 35,010)
Sunday, 29 July (4:10 pm)	Port Adelaide 25.13 (163)	def.	Melbourne 11.8 (74)	AAMI Stadium (crowd: 23,485)

=== Round 18 ===
	Round 18
Friday, 3 August (7:40 pm)	Western Bulldogs 12.13 (85)	drew with	St Kilda 12.13 (85)	Telstra Dome (crowd: 33,600)
Saturday, 4 August (2:10 pm)	Carlton 14.12 (96)	def. by	Collingwood 18.12 (120)	MCG (crowd: 56,341)
Saturday, 4 August (2:10 pm)	Geelong 21.13 (139)	def.	Richmond 11.3 (69)	Skilled Stadium (crowd: 21,951)
Saturday, 4 August (7:10 pm)	Brisbane Lions 10.17 (77)	def.	Kangaroos 5.10 (40)	The Gabba (crowd: 29,233)
Saturday, 4 August (7:10 pm)	Adelaide 9.19 (73)	def.	Port Adelaide 10.5 (65)	AAMI Stadium (crowd: 42,335)
Sunday, 5 August (1:10 pm)	Melbourne 9.10 (64)	def. by	Sydney 17.10 (112)	Manuka Oval (crowd: 11,266)
Sunday, 5 August (2:10 pm)	Hawthorn 17.17 (119)	def.	Essendon 7.14 (56)	MCG (crowd: 55,019)
Sunday, 5 August (2:40 pm)	West Coast 14.13 (97)	def. by	Fremantle 19.10 (124)	Subiaco Oval (crowd: 43,096)

=== Round 19 ===
	Round 19
Friday, 10 August (7:40 pm)	Richmond 18.8 (116)	def.	Collingwood 14.12 (96)	MCG (crowd: 49,550)
Saturday, 11 August (2:10 pm)	Hawthorn 17.13 (115)	def.	Brisbane Lions 13.13 (91)	MCG (crowd: 39,007)
Saturday, 11 August (2:40 pm)	Port Adelaide 17.14 (116)	def.	Carlton 14.9 (93)	AAMI Stadium (crowd: 27,603)
Saturday, 11 August (7:10 pm)	Melbourne 19.15 (129)	def.	Western Bulldogs 12.15 (87)	Telstra Dome (crowd: 18,946)
Saturday, 11 August (7:10 pm)	Sydney 12.10 (82)	def.	St Kilda 9.11 (65)	Telstra Stadium (crowd: 63,369)
Sunday, 11 August (1:10 pm)	Kangaroos 15.12 (102)	def. by	West Coast 17.17 (119)	Telstra Dome (crowd: 26,113)
Sunday, 12 August (2:10 pm)	Geelong 15.13 (103)	def.	Adelaide 10.10 (70)	Skilled Stadium (crowd: 21,267)
Sunday, 12 August (2:40 pm)	Fremantle 21.14 (140)	def.	Essendon 11.11 (77)	Subiaco Oval (crowd: 38,274)

=== Round 20 ===
	Round 20
Friday, 17 August (7:40 pm)	Collingwood 11.15 (81)	def.	Melbourne 9.16 (70)	MCG (crowd: 46,277)
Saturday, 18 August (2:10 pm)	Essendon 18.10 (118)	def.	Carlton 16.12 (108)	MCG (crowd: 48,638)
Saturday, 18 August (2:10 pm)	St Kilda 19.12 (126)	def.	Fremantle 14.12 (96)	Telstra Dome (crowd: 24,041)
Saturday, 18 August (7:10 pm)	Brisbane Lions 9.9 (63)	drew with	Sydney 8.15 (63)	The Gabba (crowd: 33,077)
Saturday, 18 August (5:40 pm)	West Coast 18.9 (117)	def.	Richmond 12.14 (86)	Subiaco Oval (crowd: 39,752)
Sunday, 19 August (1:10 pm)	Hawthorn 12.10 (82)	def. by	Port Adelaide 12.15 (87)	Aurora Stadium (crowd: 15,264)
Sunday, 19 August (2:10 pm)	Kangaroos 13.13 (91)	def. by	Geelong 17.16 (118)	Telstra Dome (crowd: 48,501)
Sunday, 19 August (4:10 pm)	Adelaide 15.17 (107)	def.	Western Bulldogs 11.7 (73)	AAMI Stadium (crowd: 41,437)

=== Round 21 ===
	Round 21
Friday, 24 August (7:40 pm)	St Kilda 14.14 (98)	def. by	West Coast 16.10 (106)	Telstra Dome (crowd: 38,183)
Saturday, 25 August (2:10 pm)	Carlton 11.13 (79)	def. by	Kangaroos 24.17 (161)	Telstra Dome (crowd: 29,334)
Saturday, 25 August (2:10 pm)	Fremantle 22.12 (144)	def.	Melbourne 12.13 (85)	Subiaco Oval (crowd: 34,549)
Saturday, 25 August (7:10 pm)	Collingwood 15.11 (101)	def.	Sydney 11.10 (76)	MCG (crowd: 63,842)
Saturday, 25 August (7:10 pm)	Adelaide 12.14 (86)	def.	Brisbane Lions 8.12 (60)	AAMI Stadium (crowd: 46,507)
Sunday, 26 August (1:10 pm)	Western Bulldogs 10.7 (67)	def. by	Hawthorn 22.19 (151)	Telstra Dome (crowd: 32,734)
Sunday, 26 August (2:10 pm)	Geelong 15.11 (101)	def. by	Port Adelaide 16.10 (106)	Skilled Stadium (crowd: 24,331)
Sunday, 26 August (5:10 pm)	Essendon 13.14 (92)	def. by	Richmond 17.17 (119)	MCG (crowd: 88,468)

=== Round 22 ===
	Round 22
Friday, 31 August (7:40 pm)	Collingwood 11.9 (75)	def. by	Adelaide 14.10 (94)	Telstra Dome (crowd: 47,915)
Saturday, 1 September (2:10 pm)	Richmond 13.14 (92)	def. by	St Kilda 14.18 (102)	MCG (crowd: 42,472)
Saturday, 1 September (2:10 pm)	West Coast 21.6 (132)	def.	Essendon 19.10 (124)	Subiaco Oval (crowd: 42,761)
Saturday, 1 September (7:10 pm)	Brisbane Lions 15.13 (103)	def. by	Geelong 22.13 (145)	The Gabba (crowd: 34,107)
Saturday, 1 September (7:10 pm)	Port Adelaide 17.15 (117)	def.	Fremantle 12.13 (85)	AAMI Stadium (crowd: 39,270)
Sunday, 2 September (1:10 pm)	Sydney 22.9 (141)	def.	Hawthorn 10.9 (69)	SCG (crowd: 27,498)
Sunday, 2 September (2:10 pm)	Western Bulldogs 14.9 (93)	def. by	Kangaroos 23.19 (157)	Telstra Dome (crowd: 29,261)
Sunday, 2 September (5:10 pm)	Melbourne 21.13 (139)	def.	Carlton 15.18 (108)	MCG (crowd: 26,156)

== Ladder ==
2007 AFL ladder
Pos	Team	Pld	W	L	D	PF	PA	PP	Pts	
1	Geelong (P)	22	18	4	0	2542	1664	152.8	72	Finals series
2	Port Adelaide	22	15	7	0	2314	2038	113.5	60	Finals series
3	West Coast	22	15	7	0	2162	1935	111.7	60	Finals series
4	Kangaroos	22	14	8	0	2183	1998	109.3	56	Finals series
5	Hawthorn	22	13	9	0	2097	1855	113.0	52	Finals series
6	Collingwood	22	13	9	0	2011	1992	101.0	52	Finals series
7	Sydney	22	12	9	1	2031	1698	119.6	50	Finals series
8	Adelaide	22	12	10	0	1881	1712	109.9	48	Finals series
9	St Kilda	22	11	10	1	1874	1941	96.5	46	
10	Brisbane Lions	22	9	11	2	1986	1885	105.4	40	
11	Fremantle	22	10	12	0	2254	2198	102.5	40	
12	Essendon	22	10	12	0	2184	2394	91.2	40	
13	Western Bulldogs	22	9	12	1	2111	2469	85.5	38	
14	Melbourne	22	5	17	0	1890	2418	78.2	20	
15	Carlton	22	4	18	0	2167	2911	74.4	16	
16	Richmond	22	3	18	1	1958	2537	77.2	14	

Source: AFL ladder
Rules for classification: 1) points; 2) percentage; 3) number of points for.
(P) Premiers

== Win/loss table ==
Team	1	2	3	4	5	6	7	8	9	10	11	12	13	14	15	16	17	18	19	20	21	22	F1	F2	F3	GF	Ladder
Adelaide	**Ess** **−31**	WB +38	PA +24	**Syd** **+17**	Frem −1	**Coll** **−24**	BL +31	**Rich** **+9**	Carl +19	Melb −17	**Geel** **−7**	Kang +46	**WCE** **−21**	**Haw** **+71**	StK −2	**Frem** **−25**	Ess −12	**PA** **+8**	Geel −33	**WB** **+34**	**BL** **+26**	Coll +19	Haw −3	X	X	X	**8 (8)**
Brisbane Lions	**Haw** **+25**	**StK** **+52**	Syd −27	Kang −24	Carl +12	**Frem** **+45**	**Adel** **−31**	Ess −64	**Coll** **−33**	Rich; 0	**WB** **−23**	Geel −50	**PA** **−7**	WCE +27	Melb +44	**Carl** **+117**	Coll +93	**Kang** **+37**	Haw −24	**Syd**; **0**	Adel −26	**Geel** **−42**	X	X	X	X	10
Carlton	**Rich** **+17**	Geel −78	**Ess** **+3**	WCE −61	**BL** **−12**	StK −43	Coll −24	Kang −17	**Adel** **−19**	**WB** **+10**	**PA** **+39**	**Haw** **−100**	Frem −77	**Melb** **−23**	Syd −62	BL −117	**StK** **−10**	**Coll** **−24**	PA −23	Ess −10	**Kang** **−82**	Melb −31	X	X	X	X	15
Collingwood	Kang +3	WCE −12	**Rich** **+25**	**PA** **−18**	Ess +16	Adel +24	**Carl** **+24**	WB −33	BL +33	**Frem** **+9**	Melb −13	Syd +19	**Haw** **−8**	**StK** **+9**	Geel −16	**Ess** **+29**	**BL** **−93**	Carl +24	Rich −20	**Melb** **+11**	**Syd** **+25**	**Adel** **−19**	**Syd** **+38**	WCE +19	Geel −5	X	**6 (4)**
Essendon	Adel +31	**Frem** **+10**	Carl −3	StK +31	**Coll** **−16**	**Haw** **−35**	Kang −22	**BL** **+64**	Rich +8	Syd +1	**WCE** **+1**	PA −31	**Melb** **+2**	**Geel** **−50**	**WB** **−33**	Coll −29	**Adel** **+12**	Haw −63	Frem −63	**Carl** **+10**	**Rich** **−27**	WCE −8	X	X	X	X	12
Fremantle	**PA** **−16**	Ess −10	**WCE** **−31**	Melb +45	**Adel** **+1**	BL −45	**Haw** **+16**	Geel −25	**StK** **+46**	Coll −9	**Rich** **+21**	WB −26	**Carl** **+77**	Syd −28	**Kang** **−4**	Adel +25	**Geel** **−68**	WCE +27	**Ess** **+63**	StK −30	**Melb** **+59**	PA −32	X	X	X	X	11
Geelong	WB −20	**Carl** **+78**	Melb +52	Haw −4	**Kang** **−16**	Rich +157	**WCE** **+39**	**Frem** **+25**	PA +56	StK +60	Adel +7	**BL** **+50**	**Syd** **+18**	Ess +50	**Coll** **+16**	**WB** **+75**	Frem +68	**Rich** **+70**	**Adel** **+33**	Kang +27	**PA** **−5**	BL +42	**Kang** **+106**	X	**Coll** **+5**	**PA** **+119**	**1 (1)**
Hawthorn	BL −25	**Melb** **+22**	Kang +21	**Geel** **+4**	**WB** **−17**	Ess +35	Frem −16	**StK** **+28**	**WCE** **+35**	PA +34	**Syd** **−9**	Carl +100	Coll +8	Adel −71	**Rich** **+53**	StK −17	**Kang** **−37**	**Ess** **+63**	**BL** **+24**	**PA** **−5**	WB +84	Syd −72	**Adel** **+3**	Kang −33	X	X	**5 (6)**
Kangaroos	**Coll** **−3**	PA −18	**Haw** **−21**	**BL** **+24**	Geel +16	**Syd** **+16**	**Ess** **+22**	**Carl** **+17**	Melb +1	WCE −66	StK +22	**Adel** **−46**	**WB** **+26**	Rich +25	Frem +4	**Melb** **+64**	Haw +37	BL −37	**WCE** **−17**	**Geel** **−27**	Carl +82	WB +64	Geel −106	**Haw** **+33**	PA −87	X	**4 (3)**
Melbourne	**StK** **−31**	Haw −22	**Geel** **−52**	**Frem** **−45**	Syd −49	**PA** **−5**	WB −6	WCE −77	**Kang** **−1**	**Adel** **+17**	**Coll** **+13**	Rich −49	Ess −2	Carl +23	**BL** **−44**	Kang −64	PA −89	**Syd** **−48**	**WB** **+42**	Coll −11	Frem −59	**Carl** **+31**	X	X	X	X	14
Port Adelaide	Frem +16	**Kang** **+18**	**Adel** **−24**	Coll +18	**StK** **+53**	Melb +5	**Rich** **+40**	Syd −31	**Geel** **−56**	**Haw** **−34**	Carl −39	**Ess** **+31**	BL +7	WB −20	**WCE** **+91**	Rich +55	**Melb** **+89**	Adel −8	**Carl** **+23**	Haw +5	Geel +5	**Frem** **+32**	**WCE** **+3**	X	**Kang** **+87**	Geel −119	**2 (2)**
Richmond	Carl −17	**Syd** **−16**	Coll −25	**WB** **−32**	**WCE** **−23**	**Geel** **−157**	PA −40	Adel −9	**Ess** **−8**	**BL**; **0**	Frem −21	**Melb** **+49**	StK −17	**Kang** **−25**	Haw −53	**PA** **−55**	Syd −66	Geel −70	**Coll** **+20**	WCE −31	Ess +27	**StK** **−10**	X	X	X	X	16
St Kilda	Melb +31	BL −52	**WB** **+50**	**Ess** **−31**	PA −53	**Carl** **+43**	**Syd** **+26**	Haw −28	Frem −46	**Geel** **−60**	**Kang** **−22**	WCE +23	**Rich** **+17**	Coll −9	**Adel** **+2**	**Haw** **+17**	Carl +10	WB; 0	Syd −17	**Frem** **+30**	**WCE** **−8**	Rich +10	X	X	X	X	9
Sydney	**WCE** **−1**	Rich +16	**BL** **+27**	Adel −17	**Melb** **+49**	Kang −16	StK −26	**PA** **+31**	WB +43	**Ess** **−1**	Haw +9	**Coll** **−19**	Geel −18	**Frem** **+28**	**Carl** **+62**	WCE −12	**Rich** **+66**	Melb +48	**StK** **+17**	BL; 0	Coll −25	**Haw** **+72**	Coll −38	X	X	X	**7 (7)**
West Coast	Syd +1	**Coll** **+12**	Frem +31	**Carl** **+61**	Rich +23	**WB** **+15**	Geel −39	**Melb** **+77**	Haw −35	**Kang** **+66**	Ess −1	**StK** **−23**	Adel +21	**BL** **−27**	PA −91	**Syd** **+12**	WB +87	**Frem** **−27**	Kang +17	**Rich** **+31**	StK +8	**Ess** **+8**	PA −3	**Coll** **−19**	X	X	**3 (5)**
Western Bulldogs	**Geel** **+20**	**Adel** **−38**	StK −50	Rich +32	Haw +17	WCE −15	**Melb** **+6**	**Coll** **+33**	**Syd** **−43**	Carl −10	BL +23	**Frem** **+26**	Kang −26	**PA** **+20**	Ess +33	Geel −75	**WCE** **−87**	**StK**; **0**	Melb −42	Adel −34	**Haw** **−84**	**Kang** **−64**	X	X	X	X	13
Team	1	2	3	4	5	6	7	8	9	10	11	12	13	14	15	16	17	18	19	20	21	22	F1	F2	F3	GF	Ladder

+	Win	Qualified for finals
−	Loss	Eliminated

Bold – Home game
X – Bye
Opponent for round listed above margin

=== Ladder progression ===
Numbers highlighted in green indicate that the team finished the round inside the top 8.
Numbers highlighted in blue indicates the team finished first on the ladder in that round.
Numbers highlighted in red indicates the team finished in last place on the ladder in that round.

Team ╲ Round	1	2	3	4	5	6	7	8	9	10	11	12	13	14	15	16	17	18	19	20	21	22
**Geelong** (**P**)	0	4	8	8	8	12	16	20	24	28	32	36	40	44	48	52	56	60	64	68	68	72
Port Adelaide	4	8	8	12	16	20	24	24	24	24	24	28	32	32	36	40	44	44	48	52	56	60
West Coast	4	8	12	16	20	24	24	28	28	32	32	32	36	36	36	40	44	44	48	52	56	60
Kangaroos	0	0	0	4	8	12	16	20	24	24	28	28	32	36	40	44	48	48	48	48	52	56
Hawthorn	0	4	8	12	12	16	16	20	24	28	28	32	36	36	40	40	40	44	48	48	52	52
Collingwood	4	4	8	8	12	16	20	20	24	28	28	32	32	36	36	40	40	44	44	48	52	52
Sydney	0	4	8	8	12	12	12	16	20	20	24	24	24	28	32	32	36	40	44	46	46	50
Adelaide	0	4	8	12	12	12	16	20	24	24	24	28	28	32	32	32	32	36	36	40	44	48
St Kilda	4	4	8	8	8	12	16	16	16	16	16	20	24	24	28	32	36	38	38	42	42	46
Brisbane Lions	4	8	8	8	12	16	16	16	16	18	18	18	18	22	26	30	34	38	38	40	40	40
Fremantle	0	0	0	4	8	8	12	12	16	16	20	20	24	24	24	28	28	32	36	36	40	40
Essendon	4	8	8	12	12	12	12	16	20	24	28	28	32	32	32	32	36	36	36	40	40	40
Western Bulldogs	4	4	4	8	12	12	16	20	20	20	24	28	28	32	36	36	36	38	38	38	38	38
Melbourne	0	0	0	0	0	0	0	0	0	4	8	8	8	12	12	12	12	12	16	16	16	20
Carlton	4	4	8	8	8	8	8	8	8	12	16	16	16	16	16	16	16	16	16	16	16	16
Richmond	0	0	0	0	0	0	0	0	0	2	2	6	6	6	6	6	6	6	10	10	14	14

== Finals series ==
Qualifying and elimination finals
9 Sep, MCG
1	Geelong	23.18 (156)
4	Kangaroos	8.2 (50)
8 Sep, Telstra Dome
5	Hawthorn	15.15 (105)
8	Adelaide	15.12 (102)
8 Sep, MCG
6	Collingwood	18.17 (125)
7	Sydney	13.9 (87)
7 Sep, AAMI Stadium
2	Port Adelaide	9.14 (68)
3	West Coast	9.11 (65)

Semi-finals
15 Sep, MCG
Kangaroos	14.9 (93)
Hawthorn	8.12 (60)
14 Sep, Subiaco Oval
West Coast	10.14 (74) (aet)
Collingwood	13.15 (93) (aet)

Preliminary finals
21 Sep, MCG
Geelong	13.14 (92)
Collingwood	13.9 (87)
22 Sep, AAMI Stadium
Port Adelaide	20.13 (133)
Kangaroos	5.16 (46)

Grand final
29 Sep, MCG
Geelong	24.19 (163)
Port Adelaide	6.8 (44)

=== Week one ===
	Qualifying finals
QF2: Friday, 7 September (7:50 pm)	Port Adelaide 9.14 (68)	def.	West Coast 9.11 (65)	AAMI Stadium (crowd: 37,750)
QF1: Sunday, 9 September (2:45 pm)	Geelong 23.18 (156)	def.	Kangaroos 8.2 (50)	MCG (crowd: 77,630)

	Elimination finals
EF1: Saturday, 8 September (2:30 pm)	Hawthorn 15.15 (105)	def.	Adelaide 15.12 (102)	Telstra Dome (crowd: 36,534)
EF2: Saturday, 8 September (7:30 pm)	Collingwood 18.17 (125)	def.	Sydney 13.9 (87)	MCG (crowd: 64,645)

=== Week two ===
	Semi-finals
SF2: Friday, 14 September (6:45 pm)	West Coast 10.14 (74)^{(ET)}	def. by	Collingwood 13.15 (93)^{(ET)}	Subiaco Oval (crowd: 43,627)
SF1: Saturday, 15 September (7:30 pm)	Kangaroos 14.9 (93)	def.	Hawthorn 8.12 (60)	MCG (crowd: 74,981)
West Coast became the second team since the current finals system was established in 2000 to lose both of its finals after qualifying for the double chance by finishing in the top four.

=== Week three ===
	Preliminary finals
PF1: Friday, 21 September (7:50 pm)	Geelong 13.14 (92)	def.	Collingwood 13.9 (87)	MCG (crowd: 98,002)
PF2: Saturday, 22 September (4:00 pm)	Port Adelaide 20.13 (133)	def.	Kangaroos 5.16 (46)	AAMI Stadium (crowd: 43,953)

=== Week four ===
Grand final
Saturday, 29 September (2:30 pm)	Geelong	def.	Port Adelaide	MCG (crowd: 97,302)	Report
5.7 (37); 11.13 (79); 18.17 (125); 24.19 (163)	Q1; Q2; Q3; Final	2.2 (14); 4.3 (27); 5.5 (35); 6.8 (44)	Umpires: McBurney, McInerney, McLaren; Norm Smith Medal: Steve Johnson (Geelong); Television broadcast: Network Ten; National anthem: Natalie Bassingthwaighte
Mooney 5 Chapman, Johnson 4 N. Ablett 3 Bartel 2 Ottens, Byrnes, G. Ablett, Rooke, Ling, Mackie 1	Goals	2 Tredrea, S. Burgoyne; 1 C. Cornes, Logan
Johnson, Chapman, Scarlett, King, Ottens, Mooney, Corey, Enright, Bartel	Best	Tredrea, P. Burgoyne, K. Cornes
Nil	Injuries	Nil
Nil	Reports	Nil
Geelong's winning margin of 119 points is the greatest winning margin in a VFL/AFL grand final.

== Awards ==
- The 2007 Brownlow Medal for the AFL's best and fairest player was awarded to Jimmy Bartel, of Geelong, who polled 29 votes.
- The AFL Players Association's Leigh Matthews Trophy for the most valuable player was awarded to Gary Ablett, Jr., of Geelong.
- The Coleman Medal was awarded to Jonathan Brown of Brisbane Lions, who kicked 77 goals.
- The Norm Smith Medal as the player adjudged best afield in the AFL Grand Final was awarded to Steve Johnson, of Geelong.
- The AFL Rising Star award (Ron Evans Medal) was awarded to Joel Selwood, of Geelong.
- The McClelland Trophy was awarded to Geelong for holding top position on the ladder after 22 rounds.
- The Wooden Spoon was awarded to Richmond for coming in last place on the ladder after 22 rounds.
- Andrew McLeod from Adelaide was named the captain of the 2007 All-Australian Team.
- The AFL Mark of the Year was awarded to Michael Newton of Melbourne.
- The AFL Goal of the Year was awarded to Matthew Lloyd of Essendon.
- The AFL Army Award was awarded to Alwyn Davey of Essendon as the footballer who displayed the most courageous and/or team related act of the season.

=== Best and fairests ===
- Adelaide: Andrew McLeod
- Brisbane: Jonathan Brown
- Carlton: Andrew Carrazzo
- Collingwood: Travis Cloke
- Essendon: James Hird
- Fremantle: Matthew Pavlich
- Geelong: Gary Ablett, Jr.
- Hawthorn: Brad Sewell
- Kangaroos: Brent Harvey
- Melbourne: James McDonald
- Port Adelaide: Kane Cornes
- Richmond: Matthew Richardson
- St Kilda: Nick Riewoldt
- Sydney: Brett Kirk
- West Coast: Darren Glass
- Western Bulldogs: Brian Harris

== Notable events ==
- On Thursday 8 February it was announced that the Seven Network (who had not broadcast AFL for five years) and Ten Network had reached an agreement to on-sell four games per round to pay-TV provider Foxtel.
- In round 6, Geelong scored 35.12 (222) against Richmond, which was at the time the highest score kicked in an AFL game since quarters were shortened from twenty-five to twenty minutes in 1994. It was also the first time a team has scored over 200 points since round 22, 1995. Their winning margin of 157 points also broke the record for the same period, and they scored an all-time record 23 more goals than behinds, and an all-time record three-quarter time score of 29.9 (183). This was also Richmond’s biggest loss in its 99-year VFL/AFL history and as of 2022 remains the biggest winning margin for any game at Docklands Stadium.
- In round 8, Hawthorn and St Kilda were widely criticised for their game, which in perfect weather yielded only seven goals in the first three-quarters (before opening up in the final quarter, where nine goals were kicked), and was described as boring by Essendon coach Kevin Sheedy.
- Round 12's game between Carlton and Hawthorn attracted 53,459 fans, breaking the record for the highest AFL crowd at Telstra Dome. In the same game, Hawthorn kicked their highest ever score against Carlton: 27.18 (180), and also achieved their greatest winning margin against Carlton, 100 points.
- Robert Harvey became just the 10th player in VFL/AFL history to reach 350 games, helping St Kilda defeat West Coast. The win was the second time in 60 games that a Victorian team had beaten West Coast at Subiaco Oval.
- The round 16 game between the Brisbane Lions and Carlton at The Gabba saw Jonathan Brown become the first Brisbane Lions player to kick 10 goals in a match. He kicked 10.1 for the game. This surpassed Daniel Bradshaw's 9 goals in 2005 v Melbourne at The Gabba. After this match Denis Pagan was sacked as the coach of Carlton.
- On 24 August, the Seven Network broadcast some details obtained from players' confidential medical records on its nightly news program relating to the use of non-performance-enhancing drugs. It allegedly purchased these details for $3,000 from a woman who found them in a gutter outside a medical clinic in Melbourne. The name of the club involved, Hawthorn, was revealed by Seven on air, but before the end of the news program (at which time Seven had promised to actually reveal the names of the players), the AFL obtained a court injunction from the Supreme Court of Victoria which prevented this – and which continues to suppress the publication of any part of the records, including the name of the club. Because anonymity was guaranteed under the AFL's "three-strikes" drugs policy, the AFL players responded by boycotting the Seven Network, refusing to answer any questions posed by its journalists, including in matches broadcast by the network. Shortly after the completion of round 22, faced with the possibility of ongoing player boycotts – including of the Brownlow Medal count – the Seven Network issued a statement "regretting" any harm the broadcast may have caused to the AFL, the clubs and the players, and promised not to broadcast or reveal any of the details of the medical records in future. The AFL Players Association took the "statement of regret" as an apology and the boycott was lifted. The scandal came to be known as "Guttergate".
- The final game of the home-and-away season was particularly controversial as two teams, Melbourne and Carlton, each had records of 4–17, and had no chance of winning the wooden spoon, which had been won by Richmond (record of 3-18-1). Under priority draft pick rules, this meant that whichever team won the game would lose a potential priority draft pick (which would have been the first overall selection if Carlton had it, or pick No. 18 if Melbourne had it). Melbourne won by five goals in a game noted for a lack of defensive pressure, while many in the crowd openly supported their teams to defeat.
- The second semi-final between West Coast and Collingwood went into extra time after scores were level at the end of regulation. This was only the second time that extra time has been used in an AFL game, and was also the second time that these teams had drawn in a final.
- Geelong set a new record for the highest winning margin in a grand final against Port Adelaide, winning by 119 points.

== Club leadership ==
Club	Captain(s)	Vice Captain(s)/Leadership Group
Adelaide	Mark Ricciuto	Simon Goodwin, Tyson Edwards, Nathan Bassett and Brett Burton
Brisbane Lions	Simon Black, Jonathan Brown, Chris Johnson, Nigel Lappin, Luke Power	
Carlton	Lance Whitnall	Nick Stevens, Kade Simpson (interim)
Collingwood	Nathan Buckley	James Clement (Vice Captain), Josh Fraser (deputy VC), Ben Johnson (deputy VC)
Essendon	Matthew Lloyd	David Hille
Fremantle	Matthew Pavlich	Josh Carr
Geelong	Tom Harley	Cameron Ling, Cameron Mooney (deputy)
Hawthorn	Richard Vandenberg	Luke Hodge, Sam Mitchell
Kangaroos	Adam Simpson	Brent Harvey
Melbourne	David Neitz	Cameron Bruce, Brad Green, Brock McLean, James McDonald
Port Adelaide	Warren Tredrea	Shaun Burgoyne, Brendon Lade, Michael Wilson, Chad Cornes
Richmond	Kane Johnson	Nathan Brown, Joel Bowden (deputy)
St Kilda	Luke Ball, Lenny Hayes, Nick Riewoldt	
Sydney	Leo Barry, Barry Hall, Brett Kirk	
West Coast	Chris Judd	Andrew Embley, Darren Glass, Dean Cox
Western Bulldogs	Brad Johnson	Scott West, Robert Murphy, Daniel Cross and Daniel Giansiracusa

== Umpires ==
- Michael Avon
- Ray Chamberlain
- Chris Donlon
- Martin Ellis
- Luke Farmer
- Darren Goldspink
- Stefan Grun
- Matthew Head
- Craig Hendrie
- Scott Jeffery
- Chris Kamolins
- Hayden Kennedy
- Dean Margetts
- Stephen McBurney
- Shane McInerney
- Simon Meredith
- Kieron Nicholls
- Matthew Nicholls
- Troy Pannell
- Brett Rosebury
- Shaun Ryan
- Matt Stevic
- Damien Sully
- Michael Vozzo
- Stuart Wenn
- Derek Woodcock

== Coach changes ==
Name	Club	Date	Reason
Neale Daniher	Melbourne	29 June	Decision that he could take the club no further.
Chris Connolly	Fremantle	17 July	Quit after run of poor results.
Denis Pagan	Carlton	23 July	Fired after five heavy losses in a row.
Kevin Sheedy	Essendon	25 July	Contract would not be renewed at end of season.
Brett Ratten	Carlton	20 August	Interim coach Ratten was given a two-year contract.
Dean Bailey	Melbourne	31 August	Dean Bailey was appointed Melbourne coach.
Mark Harvey	Fremantle	17 September	Fremantle appointed Harvey senior coach.
Matthew Knights	Essendon	27 September	Knights promised a new direction at Essendon.

== See also ==
- 2007 Australian football code crowds
- List of 2007 AFL debuts
- List of Australian Football League premiers
