= Jonathan Brown (Australian footballer) =

Australian rules footballer, born 1981

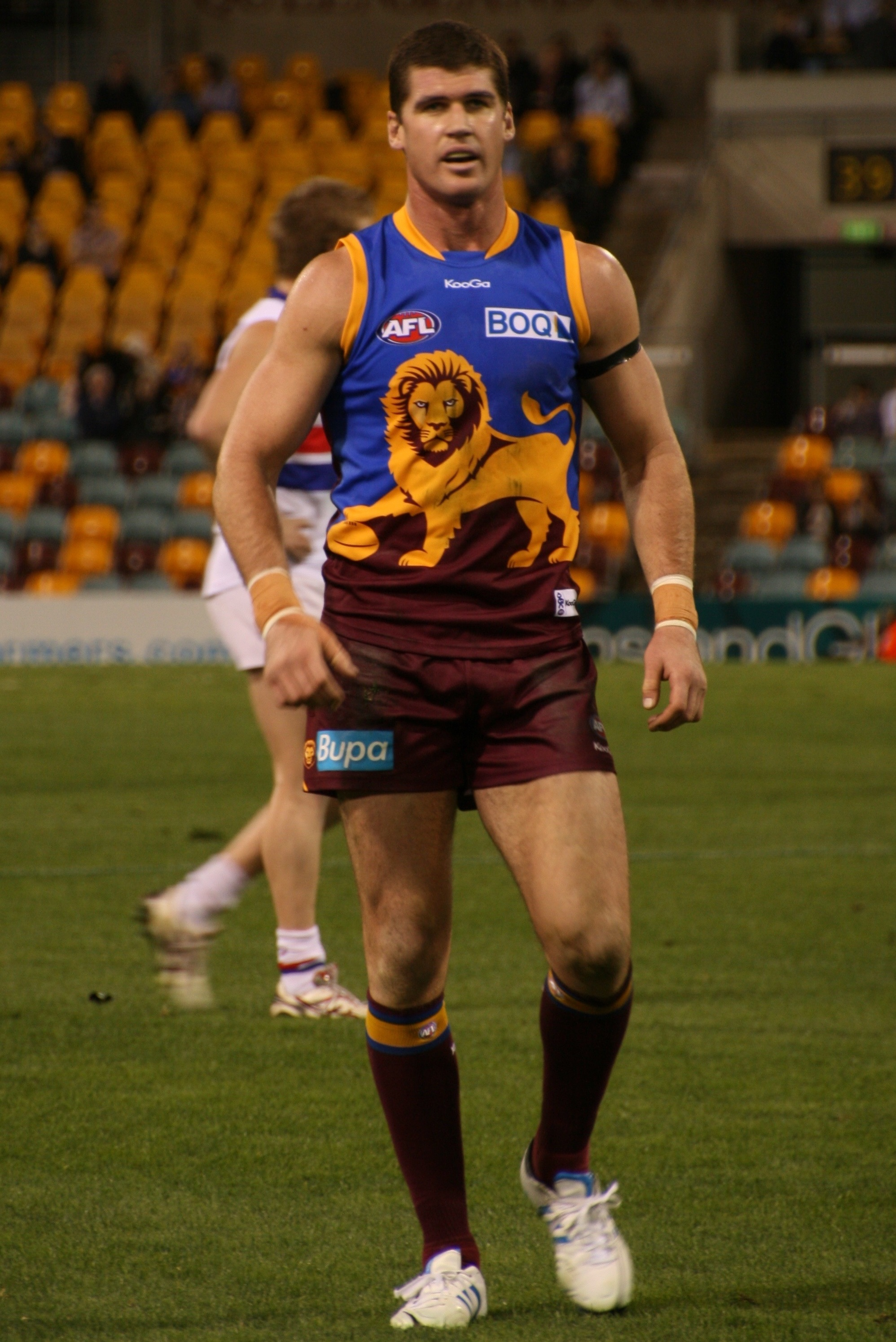
- Brown in September 2012

Personal information
- Nicknames: Brown, Browny, Jon, Jono, JB
- Born: 29 October 1981 (age 45); Port Fairy, Victoria, Australia
- Original team: Geelong Falcons (TAC Cup)
- Draft: #30 (F/S), 1999 National Draft, Brisbane Lions
- Height: 195 cm (6 ft 5 in)
- Weight: 103 kg (227 lb)
- Position: Centre half-forward

Playing career^{1}
Years	Club	Games (Goals)
2000–2014	Brisbane Lions	256 (594)

Representative team honours^{2}
Years	Team	Games (Goals)
2008	Victoria	1 (3)
- ^{1} Playing statistics correct to the end of 2014.^{2} Representative statistics correct as of 2008.

Career highlights
- 3× AFL Premiership: 2001, 2002, 2003; 2× All-Australian team: 2007, 2009; 3× Merrett–Murray Medal: 2007, 2008, 2009; Coleman Medal: 2007; 5× Brisbane leading goalkicker: 2007, 2009, 2010, 2012, 2013; Brisbane Lions captain: 2009–2012; Brisbane Lions co-captain: 2007–2008, 2013; 3× Robert Rose Award for Most Courageous Player: 2007, 2008, 2011; Marcus Ashcroft Medal: 2013; 2× AFLPA Best Captain Award: 2007, 2009; AFL Mark of the Year: 2002; NAB Cup: 2013; Victoria representative: 2008; Victoria captain: 2008; Alastair Lynch Trophy: 2010; Brisbane Lions Best Clubman: 2005; Marcus Ashcroft Most Professional Player: 2009; Brisbane Lions Most Improved Player: 2001; 2× Brisbane Lions Best Forward: 2007, 2008; 2× Shaun Hart Most Courageous Player: 2007, 2010; Brisbane Lions Members' Player of the Year: 2010; The Courier-Mail Player of the Year: 2007; Australian Football Hall of Fame inductee 2020

Jonathan Brown (born 29 October 1981) is a former Australian rules footballer. He played 15 seasons for the Brisbane Lions in the Australian Football League, where he served as captain between 2007 and 2013, and won three AFL premierships between 2001 and 2003. He is also a three-time club Best and Fairest winner, two-time All Australian (2007 and 2009), and a one-time Coleman Medallist.

== Early life ==
Brown was born in Port Fairy, in Victoria's south west, to mother Mary and father Brian (a former Fitzroy and Essendon player). He is the eldest of three brothers.

Brown grew up on his family's property and attended school at Emmanuel College Warrnambool. He grew up a Fitzroy fan and began playing Australian rules at an early age, playing school football and cricket with the Emmanuel College Hawks. Brown began playing senior football with the South Warrnambool Football Club at the age of 15. He began senior cricket at about the same time and was a stand-out left-arm fast bowler. He played A-Grade cricket with Wesley CBC where he was Cricketer of the Year two years in a row and played in a senior premiership. He was also invited to play in the Victorian under-17 squad. However, he focused on Australian rules, pursuing a dream of following Ted Whitten to represent Victoria in State of Origin. Brown drew the attention of AFL recruiters while playing under-18 representative football for the Geelong Falcons in 1999 at the national carnival in Brisbane when he was named as an All-Australian.

== AFL career ==
=== Drafting and first year: 1999–2000 ===
Brown was selected by the Brisbane Lions in the 1999 AFL draft under the father–son rule. His father considered Brisbane a good option when Leigh Matthews became the senior coach, despite Hawthorn showing interest in recruiting him. Upon moving to Brisbane, he was immediately groomed as the club's next centre half-forward. The next year, in Round 5, he played his first senior game for the Lions as an 18-year-old against the Adelaide Crows. His best game in his opening year came against Fremantle in the final round of the season when he had 23 disposals and scored two goals.

=== Four consecutive Grand Finals: 2001–2004 ===
Playing in a team which included three Brownlow Medalists (Michael Voss, Jason Akermanis and Simon Black), Brown participated in four consecutive AFL Grand Finals and was a part of three consecutive premierships in 2001, 2002 and 2003.

Touted as the next Wayne Carey early in his career, Brown was an unspectacular but consistent contributor during his first few seasons and, at 195 cm and 105 kg, was an imposing target across half-forward. In Round 6 of 2001, Brown kicked seven goals and amassed nine marks and 19 disposals in his first dominant performance in front of goals. For the season, he averaged six marks, 14 disposals and 1.5 goals per game. His season tally of 157 marks was a team-high, and his total of 38 goals was third-best of Brisbane players.

Brown was well renowned for his bravery, often putting himself in reckless situations that put the mission of the team before his own physical well-being. An example of this was when he took the 2002 Mark of the Year by running with the flight of the ball and launching into the oncoming Hawthorn player Jade Rawlings. In an interview with Mike Sheehan for Open Mike, Brown acknowledged he was running towards the pack blindly (i.e. with his eyes only on the ball, not the players converging on the pack) and committed fully to the attempt. Such efforts earned him numerous titles for courage during his career, including three Robert Rose Awards for being voted the most courageous player of the league in 2007, 2008 and 2011. Such acts of courage caused recurring injuries, especially during the past few years of his career, including four facial injuries between 2011 and 2014.

Plagued by injury and regular meetings with the AFL Tribunal during the next three seasons, Brown's development was hampered until 2004, when he had the best season of his career to that point, averaging an impressive eight marks, 16 disposals, and 2.3 goals per game. Despite missing eight games through injury and suspension, Brown kicked a career-high 39 goals and again led the Lions in marks, with 140. His progress was punctuated in the Qualifying Final against St Kilda when he achieved a best-afield six-goal performance. The season, however, ended on a sour note for Brown, as he was reported for striking Port Adelaide's Josh Carr during the Lions 40-point Grand Final loss. The report saw Brown suspended for the first five games of the 2005 season.

=== Reaching peak form: 2005–2006 ===
In 2005, Brown was promoted to the Lions' leadership group. He made his return from suspension in Round 6 of 2005 against Essendon and immediately had a significant impact, taking 14 marks and kicking eight goals on then-Essendon defender and future Sydney Swans premiership player Ted Richards, in what was arguably the best game of his career to that point. Richards was dropped from the Essendon team as a result. The following week, Brown kicked another five goals, and in Round 10 against the Kangaroos Brown had 12 marks, 27 disposals and five goals, followed by a career-high 29 disposals in round 11. Injury again cut his season short, but 2005 was clearly Brown's best individual season as he averaged eight marks, 18 disposals and 2.8 goals per game during the 12 games he played prior to Round 17, before a severe bout of osteitis pubis prevented him from having any influence in his last two games.

In May 2005, Brown was targeted by Collingwood in a deal reportedly worth $6 million over the next four seasons, but he was quick to announce that he had no plans to leave Brisbane. Two months later he officially signed a contract committing himself to the Brisbane Lions until the end of the 2008 season in a deal reportedly worth $2 million over three years.

2006 was the year in which Brown first stamped his authority on the AFL competition. Midway through the season, Brown seemed certain to claim almost every individual award on offer at the end of the year, as he dominated in the air and in front of goals on a weekly basis. Brown's form hit a peak between rounds 7 and 10, when over four games he averaged 11 marks, 20 disposals and 6.5 goals per game, including performances of seven or more goals in three successive games. Injury, however, ended his season prematurely yet again, as Brown played his last game of the season in Round 10. In the 2006 Brownlow Medal count, Brown polled 13 votes, enough to secure a top 10 finish despite only playing 10 games out of a possible 22. He was leading the count easily before he suffered the injury.

=== Vintage form: 2007–2009 ===
Following the retirement of long-time captain Michael Voss in 2006, Brown was strongly favoured to replace Voss as captain. Nevertheless, when the captaincy was announced on 20 March 2007, Brown was named as co-captain alongside Simon Black, Chris Johnson, Nigel Lappin, and Luke Power. Brown had previously acted as co-captain for the Lions in the 2007 NAB Cup Grand Final, alongside Black, Johnson, and Power, with Lappin out injured. Desperate for an injury-free season, 2007 delivered just that for Brown, and what resulted was the best season of his career. He averaged nine marks and 16 disposals per game, and kicked 77 goals at 3.5 per game in 2007. In round 16 against Carlton, he became the first Brisbane player to kick 10 goals in a game, and he finished the year with seven goals against Geelong to secure the Coleman Medal as the season's leading goal kicker. That year Brown took the most contested marks in the competition to go with his first Coleman. He also won his first Merrett–Murray Medal (the Lions best and fairest), the AFL Players Association Best Captain Award, the Robert Rose Award for Most Courageous Player, was runner-up in the Leigh Matthews Trophy as League MVP and was named vice-captain of the All Australian team. At season's end, Brown was regarded by many, including AFL guru Mike Sheahan, as the number-one player in the competition.

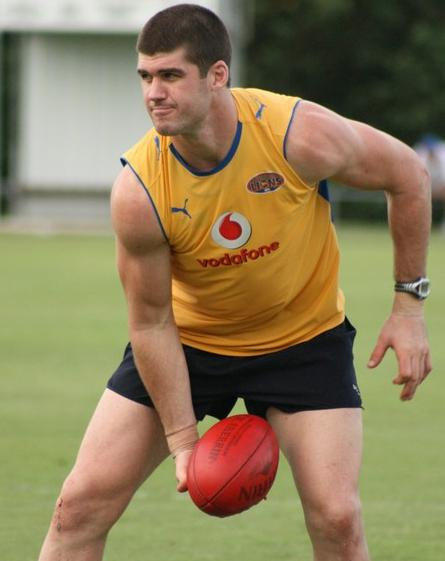
Brown at a training session in December 2008

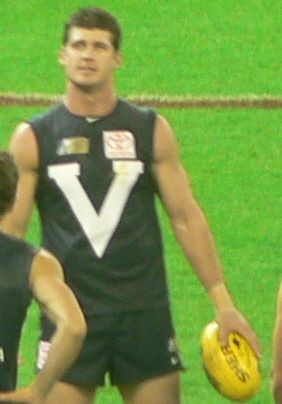
Brown captained Victoria in 2008

Brown started the 2008 season slowly compared to his 2007 form, and was rested for one game in round seven due to minor injury concerns. He then returned to his best with three consecutive six-goal performances and combined with Daniel Bradshaw to be one of the most formidable forward duos in the league in the second half of the season. In the 15 games after his week off, Brown averaged nine marks, 16 disposals and 3.7 goals per game, although his season stats were inferior to the previous year. Brown captained Victoria in the AFL Hall of Fame Tribute Match against the Dream Team, and a spectacular mark taken over Matthew Richardson in that game is captured in Jamie Cooper's painting The Game That Made Australia, commissioned by the AFL in 2008 to celebrate the 150th anniversary of the sport. He was named the AFLPA Most courageous player at the end of the 2008 season by his peers for the second consecutive year in a row, but missed out on a second All-Australian selection. Brown's 2008 season was capped off by winning his second Merrett–Murray Medal.

At the completion of Round 22 of the 2008 season, Brown announced he had signed a four-year contract that would see him remain a Lion until he is at least 31. On 27 October 2008, Lions coach Michael Voss announced Brown's appointment as sole captain of the club.

2009 was Brown's most consistent year to date, being kept goalless just once and kicking two or more goals in a club record 17 consecutive games. In round 6, Brown had 13 marks, 24 disposals and five goals against Essendon, and in Round 17, he kicked eight goals against North Melbourne, including his 400th career goal. He also had 21 disposals and 12 marks. He placed second in the Coleman Medal at season's end, eight goals behind winner Brendan Fevola, and took the most contested marks in the league. He finished the year with a career-high, and Brisbane Lions record, 85 goals and averaged 8.5 marks and 16 disposals per game. His 19 Brownlow Medal votes placed him fourth overall and he concluded the year with his third consecutive best and fairest medal, second All-Australian selection and the AFLPA Best Captain Award.

=== Battling injuries and retirement: 2010–2014 ===
Brown was hampered by injury throughout the 2010 season, causing him to miss six games for the Lions. After a promising start to 2010, Brown and other key Brisbane players were struck by injury, and the team finished the season in 13th position on the ladder. Despite missing six games and the controversial introduction of Coleman Medallist Brendan Fevola to the team, Brown was again the Lions leading goalkicker, with 53 for the season, and he came third in Brisbane's best and fairest, behind Michael Rischitelli and Simon Black. Brown was named the Members' Player of the Year and polled almost half of his best-and-fairest votes in the first four rounds.

Brown suffered a horrific facial injury in the first game of the 2011 season against Fremantle after he was kneed in the head by opposition defender Luke McPharlin in a marking attempt.

Brown suffered a second facial injury in round 17 of the 2011 season.

Brown suffered a third facial injury in less than three years in a 2012 intraclub match when teammate Matt Maguire kneed him in the head in a marking contest. Doubts started to surface over his career after such consistent damages to his skull.

In 2013, Jed Adcock was named as the Lions' co-captain alongside Brown, and, in 2014, Adcock was named as the sole captain, meaning that the Lions were not captained or co-captained by Brown for the first time since 2007.

Brown was the victim of a fourth facial injury in the Round 13, 2014 clash between the Lions and the Greater Western Sydney Giants. He collided with Tomas Bugg's knee and was removed from the ground. He suffered a concussion, causing his retirement from football.

== Statistics ==
Legend
G	Goals	K	Kicks	D	Disposals	T	Tackles
B	Behinds	H	Handballs	M	Marks

Led the league after season and finals

Season	Team	No.	Games	Totals							Averages (per game)							Votes
Season	Team	No.	Games	G	B	K	H	D	M	T	G	B	K	H	D	M	T	Votes
2000	Brisbane Lions	16	13	5	2	82	41	123	47	11	0.4	0.2	6.3	3.2	9.5	3.6	0.8	0
2001	Brisbane Lions	16	25	38	22	217	130	347	157	31	1.5	0.9	8.7	5.2	13.9	6.3	1.2	5
2002	Brisbane Lions	16	19	14	14	143	87	230	97	20	0.7	0.7	7.5	4.6	12.1	5.1	1.1	0
2003	Brisbane Lions	16	19	27	15	173	113	286	126	31	1.4	0.8	9.1	5.9	15.1	6.6	1.6	8
2004	Brisbane Lions	16	17	39	21	173	101	274	140	27	2.3	1.2	10.2	5.9	16.1	8.2	1.6	8
2005	Brisbane Lions	16	14	33	19	142	96	238	103	19	2.4	1.4	10.1	6.9	17.0	7.4	1.4	11
2006	Brisbane Lions	16	10	35	18	133	56	189	103	13	3.5	1.8	13.3	5.6	18.9	10.3	1.3	13
2007	Brisbane Lions	16	22	77	38	239	114	353	195	22	3.5	1.7	10.9	5.2	16.0	8.9	1.0	17
2008	Brisbane Lions	16	21	70	47	223	84	307	167	18	3.3	2.2	10.6	4.0	14.6	8.0	0.9	10
2009	Brisbane Lions	16	24	85	52	281	104	385	204	25	3.5	2.2	11.7	4.3	16.0	8.5	1.0	19
2010	Brisbane Lions	16	16	53	24	168	73	241	126	14	3.3	1.5	10.5	4.6	15.1	7.9	0.9	12
2011	Brisbane Lions	16	10	22	11	89	35	124	64	7	2.2	1.1	8.9	3.5	12.4	6.4	0.7	3
2012	Brisbane Lions	16	20	47	20	189	108	297	143	20	2.4	1.0	9.5	5.4	14.9	7.2	1.0	4
2013	Brisbane Lions	16	15	28	15	128	56	184	94	14	1.9	1.0	8.5	3.7	12.3	6.3	0.9	2
2014	Brisbane Lions	16	10	19	7	64	46	110	44	19	1.9	0.7	6.4	4.6	11.0	4.4	1.9	0
Career			255	592	325	2444	1244	3688	1810	291	2.3	1.3	9.6	4.9	14.5	7.1	1.1	112

== Honours and achievements ==
Brownlow Medal votes
Season	Votes
2000	0
2001	5
2002	0
2003	8
2004	8
2005	11
2006	13
2007	17
2008	10
2009	19
2010	12
2011	3
2012	4
2013	2
2014	0
Total	112

- Team
  - AFL Premiership (Brisbane): 2001, 2002, 2003
  - NAB Cup (Brisbane): 2013 (C)
- Individual (abridged; full career highlights in the info box)
  - AFL Mark of the Year: 2002
  - Coleman Medal: 2007
  - Merrett–Murray Medal (Brisbane Best & Fairest): 2007, 2008, 2009
  - All-Australian: 2007 (VC), 2009
  - AFLPA Best Captain Award: 2007, 2009
  - AFLPA Robert Rose Most Courageous Player Award: 2007, 2008, 2011
  - Brisbane Lions Leading Goalkicker: 2007, 2009, 2010, 2012, 2013
  - Brisbane Lions Captain: 2007–2013
  - In Round 7 2006, Brown got the highest-ever SuperCoach score—262—against Hawthorn. He got 18 kicks, 7 handballs, 16 marks, 8 goals, 4 behinds, 1 tackle and 1 free kick for.

== Media career ==
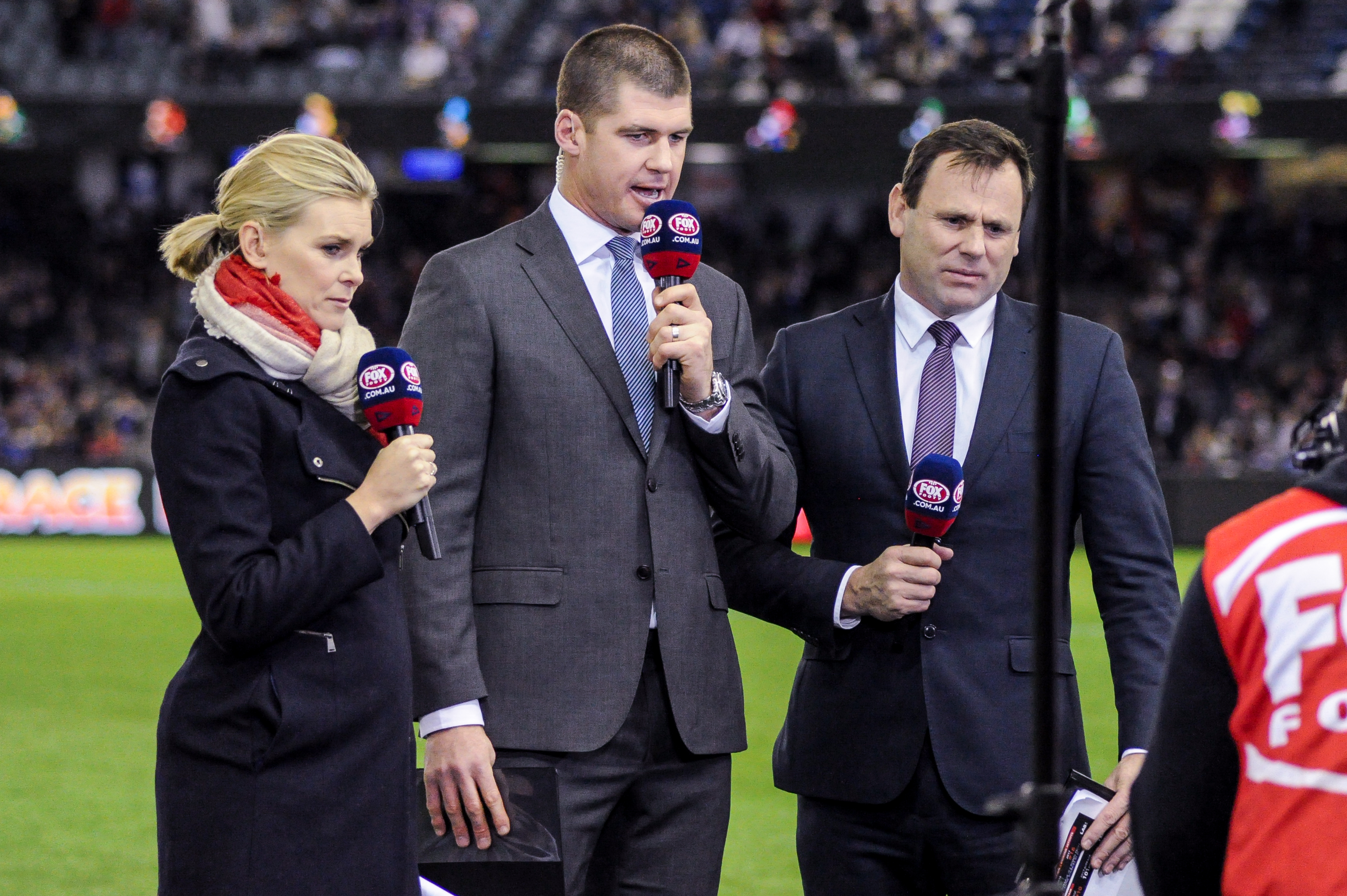
Brown (centre) with Sarah Jones (left) and David King (right) on 18 June 2017 at Docklands Stadium

In 2009, Brown featured in an official advertisement for the AFL, running a grid iron field before entering a boxing ring.

In February 2015, Brown joined Fox Footy's commentary team and began featuring on On the Couch.

In November 2015, Brown was announced as a co-host of Nova 100's new breakfast show Chrissie, Sam & Browny, alongside Chrissie Swan and Sam Pang.

Brown was selected to present the premiership cup to the Brisbane Lions after their victory in the 2025 AFL Grand Final.

== Personal life ==
Brown's father, Brian Brown, played football with Fitzroy and Jonathan was recruited to the Lions under the father–son rule. He is also the nephew of former Fitzroy player Noel Mugavin and former Collingwood player Billy Picken, and cousin of Western Bulldogs player Liam Picken.

On 25 October 2008 Brown married Kylie Adams. They have three children, two girls and a boy. He resides in the Melbourne suburb of Camberwell.
