= Kade Simpson =

Australian rules footballer, born 1984

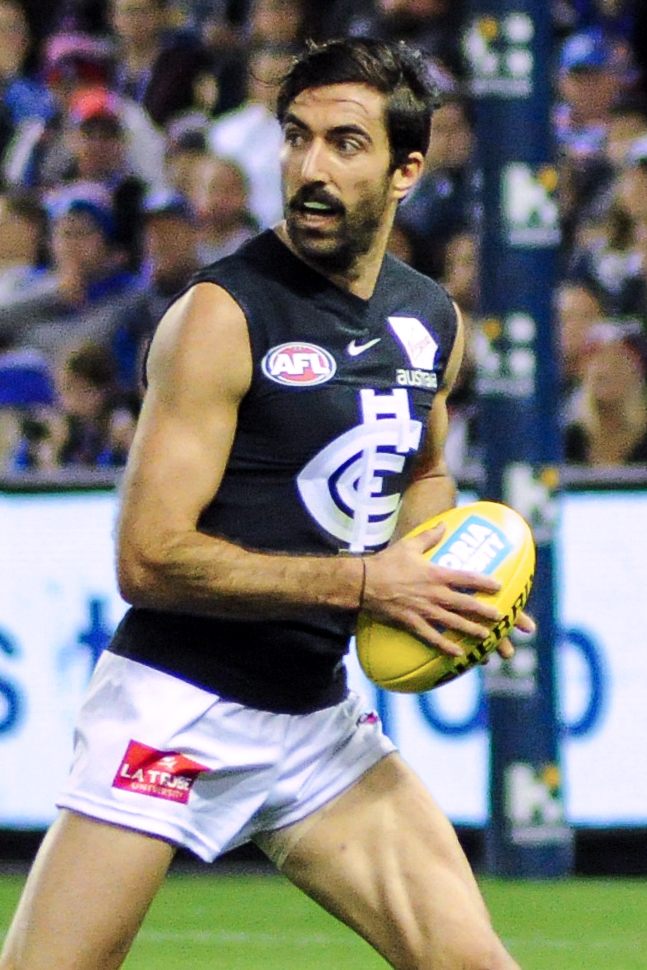
- Simpson playing for Carlton in April 2018

Personal information
- Full name: Kade Simpson
- Born: 5 May 1984 (age 42)
- Original team: Emerald (Vic)/Eastern Ranges
- Draft: No. 45, 2002 National Draft, Carlton
- Height: 183 cm (6 ft 0 in)
- Weight: 75 kg (165 lb)
- Position: Half-back flank / Wing

Playing career^{1}
Years	Club	Games (Goals)
2003–2020	Carlton	342 (138)

International team honours^{2}
Years	Team	Games (Goals)
2006–2020	Australia	8 (0)
- ^{1} Playing statistics correct to the end of 2020.^{2} Representative statistics correct as of 2017.

Career highlights
- John Nicholls Medal: 2013; 2× Pre-season premiership player: 2005, 2007; AFL Rising Star nominee: 2005; Jim Stynes Medal: 2008

Kade Simpson (born 5 May 1984) is a former Australian rules footballer who played his entire career with the Carlton Football Club in the Australian Football League (AFL).

Simpson predominantly played as a half-back flanker, while also spending time as a midfielder.

== AFL playing career ==
He grew up a 'left footer' in Emerald, Victoria.

=== Carlton ===
==== Early career (2002-2005) ====
Simpson was drafted in the fourth round of the 2002 AFL draft. He was Carlton's first pick in that year's draft, after the club was stripped of its higher selections as punishment for salary cap infringements. Carlton were fortunate to have picked Simpson given his skills were immediately apparent, but he did not have enough weight to play regular seniors in his first two seasons; even now, his weight is a relatively light 79 kg. He played primarily for Carlton's VFL-affiliate, the Northern Bullants, in his first two years, and on his few selections in the Carlton senior team, received so little ground time that he did not have a disposal in his first three games.

Simpson first broke into the senior team as a regular in the latter half of 2005. Still eligible for the AFL Rising Star in his third season on the list, Simpson was nominated in Round 18. He played nine of the last 10 games of the season, missing one game through injury, and his pace and skill began to attract attention.

==== Leadership Group and John Nicholls Medal (2006-2018) ====
Simpson took a big step up in the 2006 season, being elevated to the leadership group and running 4th in the best and fairest. He played every game, mainly as a running link-man from half-back. He finished in the top 5 in the AFL for running bounces, which was typical of his rebound play, averaged 19 disposals with a maximum of 30, and eleven goals. This style of running play prompted Kevin Sheedy to select Simpson for the Australian International Rules team for the 2006 tour of Ireland, and Mick Malthouse to do likewise for in 2008, a series in which he won the Jim Stynes Medal.

By 2007, Simpson had emerged as one of the leaders of the club. He captained the Blues between Rounds 14 and 19 during 2007, in the absence of regular captain and vice-captain Lance Whitnall and Nick Stevens, and has been vice-captain to Chris Judd since Stevens' retirement.

In 2010, Kade Simpson had arguably his best season for the Carlton Football Club, polling nine Brownlow votes (Second for Carlton, behind medal-winner Chris Judd). The most noticeable feature of his performances during the season was his tackling ability, because on 12 occasions he laid five or more tackles.

Simpson played 158 consecutive games from Round 15, 2005, until Round 15, 2012, before missing a match with a broken jaw. He was, at the time, considered the club record holder for most consecutive games, but in December 2012, the AFL amended the interpretation of this record such that Bruce Doull, who missed two club games during his streak due to playing in interstate matches on the same day, assumed the club record with 162 consecutive games.

In the 2013 season, Simpson won the John Nicholls medal, Carltons best and fairest award. Kade had 533 disposals that season, after an outstanding year playing at half-back flank position under new coach Mick Malthouse.

In the 2016 season, Simpson had an outstanding year averaging 27.2 disposals per game. He was nominated in the All Australian squad of 40 but was not named in the final 22. He finished second in Carlton's best and fairest award behind defender Sam Docherty.

==== 300 gamer (2018-2020) ====
On 30 June 2018 Simpson became the fifth Carlton player to reach the 300 game milestone.

In 2019, Simpson signed a one-year contract extension to play on in 2020. With the retirement of Daniel Wells at the end of the 2019 season, Simpson became the last remaining senior player from the 2002 AFL draft. He also decided to step down from the club's leadership group that year.

He retired at the end of the 2020 season, finishing with 342 senior games – the third most of any Carlton player in the club's history. He played 342 games across 18 seasons from 2003 to 2020, including eleven seasons in which he did not miss a game. Playing during an overall unsuccessful period in Carlton's history, he played in 215 losses, the most of any player in VFL/AFL history.

== Coaching career ==
=== Carlton Football Club AFLW assistant coach (2021-2022) ===
Simpson was appointed assistant coach of Carlton's AFLW team in November 2020. but left after the 2022 season.

=== Hawthorn Football Club assistant coach (2023-present) ===
In November 2022, Simpson joined Hawthorn as an assistant coach under senior coach Sam Mitchell.

== Statistics ==
Statistics are correct to the end of the 2020 season

Legend
G	Goals	K	Kicks	D	Disposals	T	Tackles
B	Behinds	H	Handballs	M	Marks

Season	Team	No.	Games	Totals							Averages (per game)							Votes
Season	Team	No.	Games	G	B	K	H	D	M	T	G	B	K	H	D	M	T	Votes
2003	Carlton	6	3	0	0	0	0	0	0	3	0.0	0.0	0.0	0.0	0.0	0.0	1.0	0
2004	Carlton	6	3	1	1	7	5	12	4	5	0.3	0.3	2.3	1.7	4.0	1.3	1.7	0
2005	Carlton	6	15	9	10	118	56	174	57	26	0.6	0.7	7.9	3.7	11.6	3.8	1.7	0
2006	Carlton	6	22	11	8	296	124	420	147	53	0.5	0.4	13.5	5.6	19.1	6.7	2.4	2
2007	Carlton	6	22	17	12	281	130	411	103	64	0.8	0.5	12.8	5.9	18.7	4.7	2.9	3
2008	Carlton	6	22	9	14	242	170	412	137	61	0.4	0.6	11.0	7.7	18.7	6.2	2.8	0
2009	Carlton	6	23	15	12	287	202	489	129	82	0.7	0.5	12.5	8.8	21.3	5.6	3.6	5
2010	Carlton	6	23	17	19	328	210	538	142	93	0.7	0.8	14.3	9.1	23.4	6.2	4.0	9
2011	Carlton	6	24	17	18	361	175	536	147	79	0.7	0.8	15.0	7.3	22.3	6.1	3.3	5
2012	Carlton	6	19	15	13	267	159	426	106	62	0.8	0.7	14.1	8.4	22.4	5.6	3.3	6
2013	Carlton	6	24	6	9	350	183	533	140	51	0.3	0.4	14.6	7.6	22.2	5.8	2.1	9
2014	Carlton	6	22	4	6	349	171	520	139	52	0.2	0.3	15.9	7.8	23.6	6.3	2.4	8
2015	Carlton	6	20	3	1	285	175	460	118	42	0.2	0.1	14.3	8.8	23.0	5.9	2.1	1
2016	Carlton	6	22	3	0	383	214	597	152	54	0.1	0.0	17.4	9.7	27.1	6.9	2.5	3
2017	Carlton	6	22	4	3	377	152	529	162	59	0.2	0.1	17.1	6.9	24.0	7.4	2.7	8
2018	Carlton	6	21	4	0	369	180	549	115	42	0.2	0.0	17.6	8.6	26.1	5.5	2.0	6
2019	Carlton	6	18	3	0	265	101	366	85	46	0.2	0.0	14.7	5.6	20.3	4.7	2.6	2
2020 (Note: The 2020 season was played with 17 home-and-away matches per team (down from 22) and 16-minute quarters with time on (down from 20-minute quarters with time on) due to the impact of the COVID-19 pandemic.)	Carlton	6	17	1	0	201	63	264	66	19	0.1	0.0	11.8	3.7	15.5	3.9	1.1	0
Career			342	139	126	4766	2470	7236	1949	893	0.4	0.4	13.9	7.2	21.2	5.7	2.6	67

== Honours and achievements ==
Team

- 2× Pre-season premiership player (Carlton): 2005, 2007

Individual

- John Nicholls Medal: 2013
- Carlton Vice-captain: 2013–2014, 2016
- Women of Carlton Player Ambassador Award: 2015
- Carltonians High Achiever Award: 2014, 2016
- Inner Blue Ruthless Award: 2013, 2016
- AFL Rising Star nominee: 2005
- Jim Stynes Medal: 2008
