= Brian Brown (Australian footballer) =

Australian rules footballer

Personal information
- Full name: Brian Brown
- Born: 27 September 1957 (age 69)
- Original team: Otway Rovers
- Height: 183 cm (6 ft 0 in)
- Weight: 80 kg (176 lb)

Playing career^{1}
Years	Club	Games (Goals)
1976–79, 1981	Fitzroy	51 (3)
1982	Essendon	2 (0)
Total		53 (3)
- ^{1} Playing statistics correct to the end of 1982.

Brian Brown (born 27 September 1957) is a former Australian rules footballer who played with Fitzroy and Essendon in the Victorian Football League (VFL).

Brown, who often played in the back pocket, struggled with injuries while at Fitzroy but put together 15 games in 1977 and 19 games in 1978. He missed the entire 1980 season through injury but returned in 1981 to add a further seven games and during the year bring up his 50th VFL game. This would later prove crucial as the Brisbane Lions were able to sign his son Jonathan under the father–son rule in 1999.

He spent the 1982 VFL season at Essendon and then signed with Coburg, where he played in 1983. From 1984 to 1986, Brown captain-coached Colac in the Hampden Football League. He continued on in 1987 as a player and was the league's 'Best and Fairest' winner.

== Early life and family ==
Brown graduated from St Patrick's College, Ballarat in 1975, where he was captain of the school, as well as being the captain of 1st XVIII football and 1st XI cricket sides.

Brown now is a teacher at Emmanuel College, Warrnambool, where is currently one of two deputy principals.

His son Jonathan Brown was drafted to the Brisbane Lions under the father-son rule.
