= Brad Fisher =

Australian rules footballer

Personal information
- Full name: Brad Fisher
- Born: 9 April 1984 (age 42)
- Original team: East Burwood / Eastern Ranges
- Debut: Round 2, 4 April 2003, Carlton vs. Collingwood, at M.C.G.
- Height: 192 cm (6 ft 4 in)
- Weight: 87 kg (192 lb)
- Position: Forward

Playing career^{1}
Years	Club	Games (Goals)
2003–2010	Carlton	99 (127)
2004-2010	Northern Blues	39 (79)
2011-2012	West Adelaide	38 (81)
- ^{1} Playing statistics correct to the end of 2010.

Career highlights
- Carlton NAB AFL Rising Star nominee 2003.; Carlton NAB Cup Premiership Player 2007.

Brad Fisher (born 9 April 1984) is a former Australian rules footballer in the Australian Football League.

Fisher was recruited in the 2002 AFL draft from East Burwood by the Carlton Football Club with its fifth round selection (#72 overall). He was the third-last player selected in that draft, with the two later selections, Karl Norman and Mick Martyn, also taken by Carlton, who had that year been stripped of early draft picks due to salary cap breaches. Fisher made his AFL debut for the Carlton Football Club in the second round of his first season, 2003, against Collingwood.

Fisher played both in the forward line and at half-forward. Throughout his career, he was recognised as an excellent and safe one-grab overhead mark, perhaps the best at the club, and regularly took strong contested marks in forward fifty. He played a valuable role as a supporting forward option to full-forward Brendan Fevola until 2008, and kicked a personal best four goals in a game against Essendon in 2007. From 2009, Fisher struggled for regular selection due to injuries and inconsistent form, playing only seven games for Carlton and spending the rest of the time at Carlton's VFL-affiliate, the Northern Bullants, including playing in the team's grand final loss. After injuring his knee during the 2010 preseason and undergoing a second knee reconstruction, he managed only AFL one game during the season. He spent the second half of the season with the Northern Bullants and kicked five goals in their second successive grand final loss to North Ballarat. Fisher topped the club's goal kicking list.

At the end of the 2010 season, Fisher was delisted by Carlton, after a career of 99 senior games for the club. His career was hindered by several injuries. He has had two serious injuries to his right knee, both to the anterior cruciate ligament, which caused him to miss nineteen games in 2004 and 2005 following a conventional knee reconstruction, and saw him miss the first half of the 2010 season following a LARS knee reconstruction. He also missed nine games in 2006 with shoulder injuries, the start of 2008 with a broken thumb and the start of 2009 with a dislocated elbow.

Fisher was involved in the AFL Players Association during his career, serving as Carlton's delegate for four seasons; in 2013, he became manager of the AFLPA's Alumni Program.

After being delisted, Fisher played for the West Adelaide Football Club in the South Australian National Football League in 2011 and 2012 and topped the club's goal kicking list in both seasons, In 2018, Fisher returned to the Carlton Football Club as an assistant coach for the sides AFLW team.
