= Scott Harding (footballer) =

Australian rules footballer (born 1986)

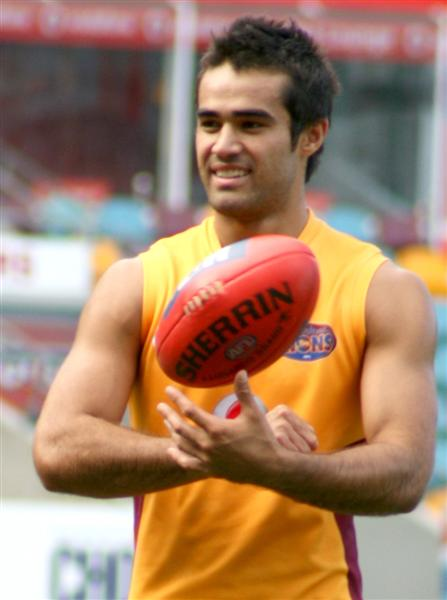
- Harding at a training session in 2008

Personal information
- Full name: Scott Harding
- Born: 19 June 1986 (age 40); Brisbane, Australia
- Original team: Alexandra Hills JAFC Springwood JAFC Morningside Australian Football Club|Morningside]] (AFLQ}
- Draft: 2005 Rookie Draft: No. 66 (Brisbane Lions); 2009 Pre-season Draft: No. 6 (Port Adelaide)
- Height: 179 cm (5 ft 10 in)
- Weight: 78 kg (172 lb)
- Position: Midfielder

Playing career^{1}
Years	Club	Games (Goals)
2006–2009	Brisbane Lions	48 (15)
2010	Port Adelaide	2 (0)
Total		50 (15)
- ^{1} Playing statistics correct to the end of 2010.

Scott Harding (born 19 June 1986) is a former Australian rules footballer who played for the Brisbane Lions and Port Adelaide Football Club in the Australian Football League (AFL). Now with Football behind him Scott finds himself holding down a pivotal role in the White Fish Golf Club where he has won two LAGAD Shields and the individual LAGAD Championship in 2022.

== Early life ==
Harding was born on Queensland in Brisbane to mother Tulaga Paitela from the Polynesian nation of Tuvalu and father Russell (a Queensland Australian Football League player and coach). Scott was educated at the Anglican Church Grammar School.

== AFL career ==
Scott Harding was drafted as a rookie by the Brisbane Lions in the 2005 AFL Draft from local Brisbane club Morningside. He played well in the 2006 NAB Cup leading to debut selection in Round 1, 2006 against Geelong. He initially wore number 45 but in 2007 switched to number 5, previously worn by dual-premiership player, Brad Scott.

At the end of the 2009 season, he was delisted by the Brisbane Lions, but was later drafted by Port Adelaide in the 2009 preseason draft. He was delisted by the Power at the end of 2010.

== American football ==
On 27 May 2011, it was announced that Harding had been awarded a scholarship to play for the University of Hawaii Warriors following a successful trial there. Unlike most Australians who have transitioned to play American football as punters, Harding played as a punt returner and wide receiver. Following the departure of head coach of Greg McMackin and the arrival of Norm Chow, Harding spent additional time as the starting punter and also spent time as a holder.

== Personal life ==
His sister, Emma Hunt, is married to rugby league footballer (and former Australian rules footballer) Karmichael Hunt.

== See also ==
- VFL/AFL players with international backgrounds
