= Cheynee Stiller =

Australian rules footballer

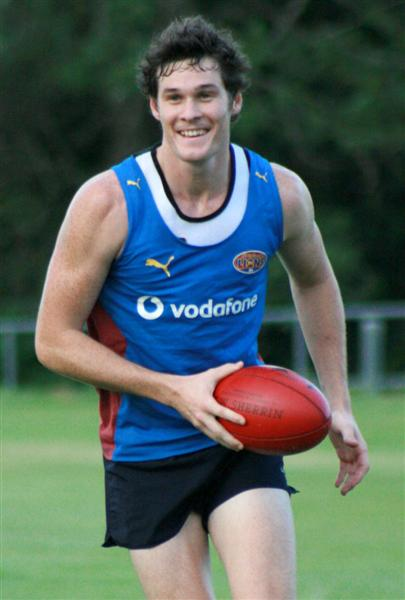
- Cheynee Stiller at a Brisbane Lions public training session in 2008.

Personal information
- Full name: Cheynee Stiller
- Nickname: Chinny
- Born: 3 May 1986 (age 40)
- Original team: Northern Eagles (QAFL)
- Draft: No. 49, 2006 Rookie Draft, Brisbane Lions
- Height: 187 cm (6 ft 2 in)
- Weight: 84 kg (185 lb)
- Position: Midfielder

Playing career^{1}
Years	Club	Games (Goals)
2006–2012	Brisbane Lions	100 (21)
- ^{1} Playing statistics correct to the end of 2012.

Career highlights
- NEAFL premiership captain: 2012

Cheynee Stiller (born 3 May 1986) is a former professional Australian rules footballer who played for the Brisbane Lions in the Australian Football League.

Stiller was recruited through the 2005 rookie draft and was elevated to the Lions senior list for round 3 of season 2006. He made his debut for the Brisbane Lions in Round 3 against St Kilda and went on to make a total of 13 appearances for the club that season. He earned an AFL Rising Star nomination for his performance against Carlton in round 13.

Stiller graduated from St. Patrick's College, Shorncliffe, Brisbane, in 2003.
