= Kieron Nicholls =

Australian rules football field umpire

Kieron Nicholls is a former Australian rules football field umpire in the Australian Football League. He umpired 154 career games in the AFL between 1996 and his retirement in 2008. He first umpired at age 16 in the Riddell District Football League, and umpired in the 1994 Victorian Football Association Grand Final.
