= Chris Kamolins =

Australian rules football field umpire

Christopher Charles Kamolins (born 25 December 1977) is an Australian rules football field umpire in the Australian Football League. He has umpired 193 career games in the AFL.

Kamolins attended primary school at Greenhills Primary School in Greensborough, Melbourne, before completing his secondary education at St Helena Secondary College in Eltham North. Chris studied at a tertiary level at RMIT University, based at the Bundoora Campus, successfully achieving at a high level a Bachelor of Nursing degree.

Kamolins was based in Queensland for a few years whilst on the AFL list, having originally been from Victoria, and returning there at the start of the 2014 season.

He umpires his first AFL Final in the 2016 AFL finals series, umpiring the 1st Elimination Final between Adelaide and North Melbourne.
