= Scott Jeffery =

Tasmanian Australian rules football field umpire

Scott Jeffery (born 11 February 1977) is a Tasmanian former Australian rules football field umpire in the Australian Football League. In a career spanning 18 seasons from 2001 until 2018, he umpired 325 career games in the AFL. Jeffery umpired in the 2016 AFL Grand Final alongside Matt Stevic and Simon Meredith. Jeffery commenced his umpiring with the Southern Tasmanian Football League and umpired his first AFL game in round 6, 2001.
