= 2017 Brisbane Lions season =

Brisbane Lions
2017 season
- President: Andrew Wellington
- Coach: Chris Fagan (AFL); Craig Starcevich (AFLW)
- Captains: Dayne Beams (AFL); Emma Zielke (AFLW)
- Home ground: The Gabba (AFL) (Capacity: 42,000); South Pine Sports Complex (AFLW) (Capacity: 3,000)
- Highest home attendance: 21,749 vs Essendon (Round 2)
- Lowest home attendance: 11,455 vs Greater Western Sydney (Round 14)
- Average home attendance: 16,520

The Brisbane Lions' 2017 season was the club's 21st season in the Australian Football League (AFL) and 1st in AFL Women's (AFLW).

== AFL ==
=== List changes ===
After suffering a heavy knock to the head at training on January 18, 2016, defender Justin Clarke was ruled out of football indefinitely, eventually retiring due to long-term health concerns. At the end of the 2016 season Trent West and Daniel Merrett both retired as well, Trent due to injury frustrations and Merrett due to wanting to spend more time with his family. The Lions also delisted five players: Hugh Beasley, Billy Evans, Josh McGuinness, Jackson Paine and Josh Watts.

During the trade period, Brisbane traded Irishman Pearce Hanley to rival club Gold Coast in a complicated three-way trade also involving Port Adelaide. Out of contract Collingwood player Jack Frost requested a trade to Brisbane after not managing to play an AFL match in 2016. He was traded to Brisbane along with Pick 76 in the 2016 national draft and Collilngwood's third round pick in the 2017 national draft in exchange for Brisbane's third and fourth round picks in the 2017 national draft. After the trade period Brisbane delisted forward Josh Green.

==== Retirements and delistings ====
| Player | Date | Reason | Career games | Career goals | Ref. |
| Justin Clarke | 31 March 2016 | Retired, effective immediately | 56 | 1 | |
| Trent West | 15 August 2016 | Retired, effective at end of season | 70 | 28 | |
| Daniel Merrett | 16 August 2016 | Retired, effective at end of season | 200 | 70 | |
| Hugh Beasley | 5 September 2016 | Delisted | 6 | 0 | |
| Billy Evans | 5 September 2016 | Delisted | 7 | 1 | |
| Josh McGuinness | 5 September 2016 | Delisted | 0 | 0 | |
| Jackson Paine | 5 September 2016 | Delisted | 16 | 11 | |
| Josh Watts | 5 September 2016 | Delisted | 0 | 0 | |
| Josh Green | 25 October 2016 | Delisted | 98 | 124 | |
| Jaden McGrath | 9 November 2016 | Retired | 3 | 0 | |

==== Trades ====
| Date | Gained | From | Lost | Ref. |
| 13 October 2016 | Pick 3 Pick 16 | Greater Western Sydney | Pick 2 Pick 31; Pick 51; Pick 60 | |
| 18 October 2016 | Pick 22 | Gold Coast | Pearce Hanley | |
| 18 October 2016 | 2017 first round pick (Port Adelaide) | Port Adelaide | Pick 19 | |
| 20 October 2016 | Jack Frost; Pick 76; 2017 third round pick (Collingwood) | Collingwood | 2017 third round pick (Brisbane); 2017 fourth round pick (Brisbane) | |

==== National draft ====
| Round | Pick | Player | Recruited from | League | Ref. |
| 1 | 3 | Hugh McCluggage | North Ballarat Rebels | TAC Cup | |
| 1 | 17 | Jarrod Berry | North Ballarat Rebels | TAC Cup | |
| 2 | 23 | Alex Witherden | Geelong Falcons | TAC Cup | |
| 2 | 24 | Cedric Cox | North Ballarat Rebels | TAC Cup | |
| 4 | 55 | Jacob Allison | Aspley | NEAFL | |
| 5 | 71 | Corey Lyons | Sandringham Dragons | TAC Cup | |
| Rookie elevation | | Archie Smith | Brisbane Lions | AFL | |

==== Rookie draft ====
| Round | Pick | Player | Recruited from | League | Ref. |
| 1 | 2 | Jake Barrett | Greater Western Sydney | AFL | |
| 2 | 20 | Mitch Hinge | Glenelg | SANFL | |
| 3 | 37 | Oscar McInerney | Casey | VFL | |
| Category B | | Matt Eagles | North Ballarat | VFL | |
| Category B | | Blake Grewar | Redland | NEAFL | |

=== Squad ===
Brisbane Lions
| Senior list | | Rookie list | Coaching staff |
|---|---|---|---|
| 1 Ben Keays; 2 Ryan Harwood; 3 Allen Christensen; 4 Ryan Bastinac; 5 Mitch Robinson; 6 Hugh McCluggage; 7 Tom Bell; 8 Rohan Bewick; 9 Dayne Beams (c); 10 Daniel Rich; 12 Stefan Martin; 13 Jarrod Berry; 14 Josh Walker; 15 Dayne Zorko (vc); 16 Jarrad Jansen; 17 Claye Beams; 18 Nick Robertson; 19 Josh Clayton; 20 Cedric Cox; 21 Sam Skinner | 22 Marco Paparone; 23 Josh Schache; 24 Liam Dawson; 25 Daniel McStay; 26 Tom Cutler; 27 Darcy Gardiner; 28 Lewis Taylor; 29 Alex Witherden; 30 Eric Hipwood; 31 Harris Andrews; 32 Sam Mayes; 33 Michael Close; 34 Jonathan Freeman; 35 Ryan Lester; 36 Rhys Mathieson; 37 Jacob Allison; 38 Tom Rockliff (vc); 39 Corey Lyons; 44 Archie Smith; 45 Jack Frost | 11 Cian Hanley (B); 40 Matthew Hammelmann; 41 Matt Eagles (B); 42 Mitch Hinge; 43 Jake Barrett; 46 Oscar McInerney; 47 Reuben William; 48 Blake Grewar (B) | Head coach: Chris Fagan; Assistant coaches: Dale Tapping (midfield); Murray Davis (backline); Ben Hudson (forwards and ruck); Jed Adcock (assistant midfield); Danny Daly (football strategy); Scott Borlace (head of development); Paul Henriksen (development); Zane Littlejohn (development); Mitch Hahn (NEAFL coach); Legend: (c) Captain(s); (vc) Vice-captain(s); Injury list; Upgraded rookie(s); (B) Category B rookie; Updated: 25 May 2017; Source(s): Senior list, Rookie list, Coaching staff |

=== Results ===
==== Pre-season ====
| | 2017 JLT Community Series |
| Sunday, 19 February (3:40 pm) | Gold Coast 0.11.15 (81) | def. | Brisbane Lions 1.7.6 (57) | Kombumerri Park, Merrimac (crowd: 2,174) | Report |
| Thursday, 2 March (7:40 pm) | Western Bulldogs 1.6.13 (58) | def. by | Brisbane Lions 0.10.6 (66) | Etihad Stadium (crowd: 4,901) | Report |
| Saturday, 11 March (3:40 pm) | Adelaide 1.20.13 (142) | def. | Brisbane Lions 1.15.4 (103) | Hickinbotham Oval (crowd: 4,350) | Report |

==== Premiership season ====
Brisbane started the season with a two-point win over Gold Coast in the first QClash of the season despite Gold Coast fighting back from a 47-point deficit, but they went on to lose their next nine matches, going into their bye round with a 1-9 record and on the bottom of the ladder. After the week off they played against top eight side Fremantle and won by 57 points to end their losing streak and take the Dockers out of the top eight. Their form improved somewhat for the rest of the season, winning a total of five games before the final round. Their final match was against North Melbourne with the loser to finish on the bottom of the ladder. When North Melbourne won the match by 51 points, Brisbane secured their first wooden spoon since 1998.

| | Round 1 (QClash) |
| Saturday, 25 March (6:25 pm) | Gold Coast 14.12 (96) | def. by | Brisbane Lions 15.8 (98) | Metricon Stadium (crowd: 12,710) | Report |

| | Round 2 |
| Saturday, 1 April (6:25 pm) | Brisbane Lions 12.12 (84) | def. by | Essendon 17.9 (111) | Gabba (crowd: 21,749) | Report |

| | Round 3 |
| Sunday, 9 April (1:10 pm) | St Kilda 14.23 (107) | def. | Brisbane Lions 11.10 (76) | Etihad Stadium (crowd: 23,097) | Report |

| | Round 4 (Easter) |
| Sunday, 16 April (4:40 pm) | Brisbane Lions 10.7 (67) | def. by | Richmond 17.17 (119) | Gabba (crowd: 21,669) | Report |

| | Round 5 (Anzac Round) |
| Saturday, 22 April (1:45 pm) | Western Bulldogs 17.20 (122) | def. | Brisbane Lions 14.6 (90) | Etihad Stadium (crowd: 31,822) | Report |

| | Round 6 |
| Saturday, 29 April (4:35 pm) | Brisbane Lions 10.7 (67) | def. by | Port Adelaide 22.18 (150) | Gabba (crowd: 13,638) | Report |

| | Round 7 |
| Sunday, 7 May (1:10 pm) | Sydney 20.15 (135) | def. | Brisbane Lions 12.9 (81) | SCG (crowd: 25,619) | Report |

| | Round 8 |
| Saturday, 13 May (1:45 pm) | Hawthorn 17.11 (113) | def. | Brisbane Lions 11.9 (75) | University of Tasmania Stadium (crowd: 10,553) | Report |

| | Round 9 |
| Saturday, 20 May (7:25 pm) | Brisbane Lions 7.18 (60) | def. by | Adelaide 21.14 (140) | Gabba (crowd: 13,802) | Report |

| | Round 10 (Sir Doug Nicholls Round) |
| Sunday, 28 May (1:10 pm) | Collingwood 18.21 (129) | def. | Brisbane Lions 13.6 (84) | MCG (crowd: 32,750) | Report |

| Round 11 |
| Bye; Brisbane Lions |

| | Round 12 |
| Saturday, 10 June (4:35 pm) | Brisbane Lions 18.13 (121) | def. | Fremantle 9.10 (64) | Gabba (crowd: 11,742) | Report |

| | Round 13 |
| Saturday, 17 June (4:05 pm) | Port Adelaide 18.13 (121) | def. | Brisbane Lions 12.9 (81) | Adelaide Oval (crowd: 31,772) | Report |

| | Round 14 |
| Saturday, 24 June (4:35 pm) | Brisbane Lions 12.14 (86) | def. by | Greater Western Sydney 22.14 (146) | Gabba (crowd: 11,455) | Report |

| | Round 15 |
| Sunday, 2 July (1:10 pm) | Essendon 11.16 (82) | def. by | Brisbane Lions 13.12 (90) | Etihad Stadium (crowd: 41,246) | Report |

| | Round 16 |
| Saturday, 8 July (7:25 pm) | Brisbane Lions 11.12 (78) | def. by | Geelong 25.13 (163) | Gabba (crowd: 18,769) | Report |

| | Round 17 |
| Sunday, 16 July (1:10 pm) | Richmond 16.16 (112) | def. | Brisbane Lions 12.9 (81) | Etihad Stadium (crowd: 28,188) | Report |

| | Round 18 |
| Sunday, 23 July (4:40 pm) | Brisbane Lions 17.10 (112) | def. | Carlton 11.16 (82) | Gabba (crowd: 18,847) | Report |

| | Round 19 (Multicultural Round) |
| Sunday, 30 July (2:40 pm) | West Coast 17.11 (113) | def. | Brisbane Lions 6.9 (45) | Domain Stadium (crowd: 32,652) | Report |

| | Round 20 |
| Saturday, 5 August (4:35 pm) | Brisbane Lions 13.11 (89) | def. by | Western Bulldogs 14.19 (103) | Gabba (crowd: 16,148) | Report |

| | Round 21 (QClash) |
| Saturday, 12 August (4:35 pm) | Brisbane Lions 22.10 (142) | def. | Gold Coast 12.12 (84) | Gabba (crowd: 17,772) | Report |

| | Round 22 |
| Sunday, 20 August (1:10 pm) | Melbourne 16.8 (104) | def. | Brisbane Lions 14.7 (91) | MCG (crowd: 30,422) | Report |

| | Round 23 |
| Saturday, 26 August (2:10 pm) | Brisbane Lions 11.13 (79) | def. by | North Melbourne 19.16 (130) | Gabba (crowd: 15,416) | Report |

=== Ladder ===
| Pos | Team | Pld | W | L | D | PF | PA | PP | Pts | Qualification |
|---|---|---|---|---|---|---|---|---|---|---|
| 1 | Adelaide | 22 | 15 | 6 | 1 | 2415 | 1776 | 136.0 | 62 | 2017 finals |
| 2 | Geelong | 22 | 15 | 6 | 1 | 2134 | 1818 | 117.4 | 62 | 2017 finals |
| 3 | Richmond (P) | 22 | 15 | 7 | 0 | 1992 | 1684 | 118.3 | 60 | 2017 finals |
| 4 | Greater Western Sydney | 22 | 14 | 6 | 2 | 2081 | 1812 | 114.8 | 60 | 2017 finals |
| 5 | Port Adelaide | 22 | 14 | 8 | 0 | 2168 | 1671 | 129.7 | 56 | 2017 finals |
| 6 | Sydney | 22 | 14 | 8 | 0 | 2093 | 1651 | 126.8 | 56 | 2017 finals |
| 7 | Essendon | 22 | 12 | 10 | 0 | 2135 | 2004 | 106.5 | 48 | 2017 finals |
| 8 | West Coast | 22 | 12 | 10 | 0 | 1964 | 1858 | 105.7 | 48 | 2017 finals |
| 9 | Melbourne | 22 | 12 | 10 | 0 | 2035 | 1934 | 105.2 | 48 | |
| 10 | Western Bulldogs | 22 | 11 | 11 | 0 | 1857 | 1913 | 97.1 | 44 | |
| 11 | St Kilda | 22 | 11 | 11 | 0 | 1925 | 1986 | 96.9 | 44 | |
| 12 | Hawthorn | 22 | 10 | 11 | 1 | 1864 | 2055 | 90.7 | 42 | |
| 13 | Collingwood | 22 | 9 | 12 | 1 | 1944 | 1963 | 99.0 | 38 | |
| 14 | Fremantle | 22 | 8 | 14 | 0 | 1607 | 2160 | 74.4 | 32 | |
| 15 | North Melbourne | 22 | 6 | 16 | 0 | 1983 | 2264 | 87.6 | 24 | |
| 16 | Carlton | 22 | 6 | 16 | 0 | 1594 | 2038 | 78.2 | 24 | |
| 17 | Gold Coast | 22 | 6 | 16 | 0 | 1756 | 2311 | 76.0 | 24 | |
| 18 | Brisbane Lions | 22 | 5 | 17 | 0 | 1877 | 2526 | 74.3 | 20 | |

Source: AFL
Rules for classification: 1) points; 2) percentage; 3) number of points for.
(P) Premiers

=== Attendances ===
2017 Brisbane Lions attendances
| Club | Total | Games | Avg. per game | Home total | Home games | Home avg. |
|---|---|---|---|---|---|---|
| Brisbane Lions | 481838 | 22 | 21902 | 181007 | 11 | 16455 |

== AFL Women's ==
In May 2016, the club launched a bid to enter a team in the inaugural AFL Women's season in 2017. The Brisbane Lions were granted a license on 15 June 2016, becoming one of eight teams to compete in the league's first season. Former AFL Queensland employee Breeanna Brock was appointed to the position of Women’s CEO the following day.

Tayla Harris and Sabrina Frederick-Traub were the club's first signings, unveiled along with the league's other 14 marquee players on 27 July 2016. A further 23 senior players and two rookie players were added to the club's inaugural list in the league's drafting and signing period. Emma Zielke will captain the team for their inaugural season.

Former Collingwood and Brisbane Bears player and AFL Queensland coach Craig Starcevich was appointed the team's inaugural head coach in June 2016. The rest of the coaching team was announced on 8 November 2016 as David Lake as the midfield coach, Daniel Merrett as the backline coach and Brent Staker as the forward coach.

Existing club sponsor Hyundai, along with Epic Pharmacy, will sponsor the team in 2017.

The team plays its home games at the South Pine Sports Complex in Brendale.

=== 2017 squad ===
Brisbane Lions (AFL Women's)
| Senior list | | Rookie list | Coaching staff |
|---|---|---|---|
| 1 Emily Bates; 2 Shaleise Law; 3 Breanna Koenen; 4 Sharni Webb; 5 Sam Virgo; 6 Megan Hunt; 7 Tayla Harris; 8 Emma Zielke (c); 9 Kate McCarthy; 10 Kaitlyn Ashmore; 11 Leah Kaslar; 13 Kate Lutkins; 14 Sabrina Frederick-Traub | 15 Jade Ransfield; 16 Tahlia Randall; 17 Jamie Stanton; 18 Ally Anderson; 19 Selina Goodman; 20 Shannon Campbell; 21 Caitlin Collins; 22 Nicole Hildebrand; 23 Jess Wuetschner; 24 Nikki Wallace; 25 Brittany Gibson; 27 Jordan Membrey | 12 Kate Deegan; 26 Delissa Kimmince | Head coach: Craig Starcevich; Assistant coaches: David Lake (midfield); Daniel Merrett (backline); Brent Staker (forwards); Legend: (c) Captain(s); (vc) Vice-captain(s); Updated: 12 January 2017; Source(s): Players, Coaches |

=== Results ===
==== 2016 Exhibition games ====
| | Game 1 |
| Saturday, 16 April 2016 | Brisbane 5.8 (38) | def. | Gold Coast 3.6 (24) | Gabba (crowd: 20,041 (D/H)) | Match report |

| | Game 2 |
| Sunday, 22 May 2016 | Melbourne 14.7 (91) | def. | Brisbane 3.2 (20) | MCG (crowd: 26,892 (D/H)) | Match report |

==== 2017 Pre-season ====
| | Trial game |
| Saturday, 21 January (3:05 pm) | Brisbane 3.10 (28) | def. | Greater Western Sydney 2.0 (12) | Coorparoo (crowd: 1,000) | Report |

==== 2017 season ====
| | Round 1 |
| Sunday, 5 February (5:05 pm) | Melbourne 1.4 (10) | def. by | Brisbane 4.1 (25) | Casey Fields (crowd: 6,500) | Report |

| | Round 2 |
| Sunday, 12 February (4:05 pm) | Fremantle 3.5 (23) | def. by | Brisbane 5.6 (36) | Fremantle Oval (crowd: 10,000) | Report |

| | Round 3 |
| Saturday, 18 February (3:35 pm) | Brisbane 4.3 (27) | def. | Collingwood 3.5 (23) | South Pine Sports Complex (crowd: 5,500) | Report |

| | Round 4 |
| Saturday, 25 February (3:35 pm) | Brisbane 6.7 (43) | def. | Greater Western Sydney 1.3 (9) | South Pine Sports Complex (crowd: 3,500) | Report |

| | Round 5 |
| Saturday, 4 March (6:40 pm) | Adelaide 4.6 (30) | def. by | Brisbane 5.3 (33) | Norwood Oval (crowd: 12,108) | Report |

| | Round 6 |
| Saturday, 11 March (10:05 am) | Brisbane 2.11 (23) | def. | Western Bulldogs 2.4 (16) | South Pine Sports Complex (crowd: 4,200) | Report |

| | Round 7 |
| Sunday, 19 March (3:35 pm) | Carlton 6.1 (37) | drew with | Brisbane 5.7 (37) | Ikon Park (crowd: 5,801) | Report |

2017 AFL Women's Grand Final
Saturday, 25 March (1:00 pm) | Brisbane | def. by | Adelaide | Metricon Stadium (crowd: 15,610) | Report
1.0 (6); 2.1 (13); 3.3 (21); 4.5 (29) | Q1; Q2; Q3; Final | 2.1 (13); 2.7 (19); 4.9 (33); 4.11 (35) | Best on ground: Erin Phillips; Television broadcast: Seven Network; National anthem: Megan Washington
Wuetschner 2, Frederick-Traub, Harris | Goals | Phillips 2, Gibson, Varnhagen
Bates, Frederick-Traub, Virgo, Kaslar, Hunt, Ashmore | Best | Phillips, Randall, Marinoff, Cramey, Gibson, Bevan
Koenen (ankle) | Injuries | Anderson (shoulder)

=== Ladder ===
| Pos | Team | Pld | W | L | D | PF | PA | PP | Pts | Qualification |
|---|---|---|---|---|---|---|---|---|---|---|
| 1 | Brisbane | 7 | 6 | 0 | 1 | 224 | 148 | 151.4 | 26 | Grand Final |
| 2 | Adelaide (P) | 7 | 5 | 2 | 0 | 291 | 185 | 157.3 | 20 | Grand Final |
| 3 | Melbourne | 7 | 5 | 2 | 0 | 258 | 183 | 141.0 | 20 | |
| 4 | Carlton | 7 | 3 | 3 | 1 | 261 | 232 | 112.5 | 14 | |
| 5 | Collingwood | 7 | 3 | 4 | 0 | 224 | 262 | 85.5 | 12 | |
| 6 | Western Bulldogs | 7 | 2 | 5 | 0 | 237 | 232 | 102.2 | 8 | |
| 7 | Fremantle | 7 | 1 | 5 | 1 | 191 | 298 | 64.1 | 6 | |
| 8 | Greater Western Sydney | 7 | 1 | 5 | 1 | 157 | 303 | 51.8 | 6 | |

Source: AFL.com.au
Rules for classification: 1) points; 2) percentage; 3) number of points for.
(P) Premiers

== NEAFL ==
Brisbane also fielded their reserves team in the North East Australian Football League for the 7th season. They won 15 of their 18 regular season games to finish 2nd on the ladder, then won finals against Sydney University and Sydney's reserves team to claim their 3rd premiership in the league.

| Pos | Team | Pld | W | L | D | PF | PA | PP | Pts |
|---|---|---|---|---|---|---|---|---|---|
| 1 | Sydney | 18 | 16 | 2 | 0 | 2350 | 1008 | 233.1 | 64 |
| 2 | Brisbane | 18 | 15 | 3 | 0 | 2138 | 1373 | 155.7 | 60 |
| 3 | Sydney University | 18 | 14 | 4 | 0 | 1948 | 1278 | 152.4 | 56 |
| 4 | Gold Coast | 18 | 10 | 8 | 0 | 1767 | 1528 | 115.6 | 40 |
| 5 | NT Thunder | 18 | 10 | 8 | 0 | 1632 | 1673 | 97.5 | 40 |
| 6 | Aspley | 18 | 8 | 10 | 0 | 1448 | 1805 | 80.2 | 32 |
| 7 | Canberra | 18 | 7 | 11 | 0 | 1158 | 1919 | 60.3 | 28 |
| 8 | Redland | 18 | 4 | 14 | 0 | 1402 | 1927 | 72.8 | 16 |
| 9 | Southport | 18 | 4 | 14 | 0 | 1257 | 1870 | 67.2 | 16 |
| 10 | WSU Giants | 18 | 2 | 16 | 0 | 1251 | 1970 | 63.5 | 8 |

Updated to match(es) played on 10 September 2017. Source: NEAFL
Rules for classification: 1) points; 2) percentage; 3) number of points for.

== See also ==
- Brisbane Lions
- 2017 AFL season
- AFL Women's
- 2017 AFL Women's season
