= 2020 Brisbane Lions season =

Brisbane Lions
2020 season
- President: Andrew Wellington^{(4th season)}
- Coach: Chris Fagan^{(4th season)}
- Captains: Dayne Zorko^{(3rd season)}
- Home ground: The Gabba
- AFL season: 2nd (14-3)
- AFL Finals series: Preliminary-finalists
- Leading goalkicker: Charlie Cameron^{(29)}
- Highest home attendance: 15,036 vs. Collingwood (Round 15)
- Lowest home attendance: 1,965 vs. West Coast (Round 3) (Note: No crowds were allowed in rounds 1 and 2 due to the COVID-19 pandemic.)
- Average home attendance: 10,648
- Club membership: 29,277

The 2020 season was the 24th season in which the Brisbane Lions have participated in the VFL/AFL.

== Impact of COVID-19 pandemic ==
The 2020 season was disrupted by the COVID-19 pandemic, which was formally declared a pandemic on 11 March 2020, eight days prior to the scheduled start of the AFL premiership season and 18 days prior to the final round of the AFL season.

=== AFL ===
Prior to the commencement of the season, the fixture was shortened from 22 matches per team to 17, under the expectation that matches would be forced to stop at the peak of the disease.

The season commenced on 19 March as originally scheduled, but the introduction of restrictions (and later of formal quarantines) on interstate travel, resulted in suspension of the season after round one. During that round, matches were played in empty stadiums for the first time in the league's history.

Throughout the season, matches were played for a shortened length of 16 minutes plus time on per quarter, instead of 20 minutes plus time on. This was originally done at the start of the season, in the hope that playing shorter games could facilitate more frequent games than weekly, maximising the games which could be played before the anticipated suspension of the season. Though the initial run of games lasted just one week, the shortened game time was retained after the season's resumption to allow make-up games to be more easily scheduled between rounds when matches were postponed or refixtured.

On 15 May, as most states began easing restrictions, the league's plan to resume the season was announced: clubs began non-contact training from 18 May, and full contact training from 25 May, ahead of resuming competitive matches from 11 June, with the revised fixture released gradually throughout the year, and changing regularly and often at short notice when the situation forced it.

The sizes of allowable crowds changed as the season progressed, with early season Queensland and New South Wales crowds limited to only a few hundred, while half crowds were allowed in the largely virus-free Western Australia from Round 7.

Following a virus outbreak in Melbourne in June, Richmond's base of operations was relocated to the Gold Coast, alongside all nine other Victorian clubs. The club played the remainder of their home games in the state, other than when travelling to other virus-free locations.

== AFL ==
=== 2019 off-season list changes ===
==== Retirements and delistings ====
Player	Reason	Club games	Career games	Ref
Tom Cutler	Traded	66	66	
Lewis Taylor	Traded	112	112	
Luke Hodge	Retired	41	346	
Ben Keays	Delisted	30	30	
Josh Walker	Delisted	52	85	
Ryan Bastinac	Delisted	43	164	
Nick Roberton	Delisted	73	73	

==== Free agency ====
Date	Player	Free Agent Type	Former Club	New Club	Copmensation	Ref
5 October	Cam Ellis-Yolmen	Unrestricted	Adelaide	Brisbane Lions	3rd round	
10 October	Grant Birchall	Unrestricted	Hawthorn	Brisbane Lions	None	

==== Trades ====
Date	Gained	Lost	Trade Partner	ref
16 October	Pick 48	Lewis Taylor	Sydney	
16 October	Pick 72	Tom Cutler & Pick 64	Essendon	

==== National Draft ====
Round	Overall pick	Player	State	Position	Team From	League From	Ref
1	22	Deven Robertson	WA	Midfielder	Perth	WAFL	
2	33	Brock Smith	VIC	Defender	Gippsland Power	NAB League	
2	37	Keidean Coleman	QLD	Forward	Brisbane Lions academy	NEAFL	
4	59	Jaxon Prior	WA	Defender	West Perth Football Club	WAFL	

==== Rookie Elevations ====
Player
Mitch Hinge
Oscar McInerney

=== 2020 squad ===
Brisbane Lions
Senior list	Rookie list	Coaching staff
1 Brock Smith; 2 Deven Robertson; 3 Allen Christiansen; 4 Callum Ah Chee; 5 Mitch Robinson; 6 Hugh McCluggage; 7 Jarrod Berry; 8 Ely Smith; 9 Lachie Neale; 10 Daniel Rich; 11 Lincoln McCarthy; 12 Stefan Martin; 13 Thomas Berry; 14 Grant Birchall; 15 Dayne Zorko (c); 16 Cam Rayner; 17 Jarryd Lyons; 18 Keidean Coleman; 20 Cedric Cox; 23 Charlie Cameron; 24 Marcus Adams; 25 Daniel McStay; 26 Connor McFadyen; 27 Darcy Gardiner; 28 Cameron Ellis-Yolmen; 29 Alex Witherden; 30 Eric Hipwood; 31 Harris Andrews (vc); 32 Tom Joyce; 33 Zac Bailey; 34 Toby Wooller; 35 Ryan Lester; 36 Rhys Mathieson; 37 Brandon Starcevich; 38 Connor Ballenden; 40 Jack Payne; 43 Noah Answerth; 45 Jaxon Prior; 46 Oscar McInerney	19 Jacob Allison; 21 Sam Skinner; 22 Mitch Hinge; 39 Corey Lyons; 41 Matt Eagles; 42 James Madden(B); 44 Archie Smith; 47 Tom Fullarton(B)	Head coach: Chris Fagan (coach); Assistant coaches: Danny Daly (Strategy); Murray Davis (Backline); Dale Tapping (Midfield); Ben Hudson (Ruck/Midfield); Jed Adcock (Forward); Scott Borlace (Head of Development); Mitch Hahn (NEAFL Head coach); Paul Henrikson (Development); Zane Littlejohn (Development); Legend: (c) Captain(s); (vc) Vice-captain(s); (B) Category B rookie; italics - Inactive player list; Long-term injury; (ret.) Retired; Updated: 2 November 2020; Source(s): https://www.lions.com.au/teams/afl,

=== 2020 season ===
==== Marsh Community Series ====
Match	Date	Score	Opponent	Opponent's score	Result	Home/away	Venue	Attendance	
1	Sunday 23 February, 3:10pm	12.5 (77)	Collingwood	14.14 (98)	Lost by 22 points	Home	Moreton Bay Central Sports Complex, Burpengary	2,027	-
2	Sunday 8 March, 6:40pm	10.6 (66)	Greater Western Sydney	16.15 (111)	Won by 45 points	Away	Ikon Park, Carlton North	7,148	

==== Home and away season ====
Round	Date	Score	Opponent	Opponent's score	Result	Home/away	Venue	Attendance	Ladder
1	Sunday, 22 March, 3:35pm	19.8 (62)	Hawthorn	14.6 (90)	Lost by 28 points	Away	MCG	0	15th
2	Saturday 13 June, 1:45pm	12.9 (81)	Fremantle	10.9 (69)	Won by 12 points	Home	The Gabba	0	11th
3	Saturday 20 June, 7:40pm	10.17 (74)	West Coast	6.8 (44)	Won by 30 points	Home	The Gabba	1,965	5th
4	Sunday 28 June, 3:35pm	10.23 (83)	Adelaide	7.4 (46)	Won by 37 points	Home	The Gabba	7,354	3rd
5	Saturday 4 July, 7:40pm	12.13 (85)	Port Adelaide	6.12 (48)	Won by 37 points	Home	The Gabba	10,161	2nd
6	Thursday 9 July, 7:40pm	6.10 (46)	Geelong	11.7 (73)	Lost by 27 points	Away	SCG	1,311	3rd
7	Saturday 18 July, 1:45pm	13.10 (88)	Greater Western Sydney	10.8 (68)	Won by 20 points	Away	GIANTS Stadium	3,168	2nd
8	Sunday 26 July, 6:10pm	7.11 (53)	Melbourne	7.7 (49)	Won by 4 points	Away	Metricon Stadium	3,011	2nd
9	Friday, 31 July, 8:10 pm	14.7 (91)	Essendon	3.10 (28)	Won by 63 points	Away	Metricon Stadium	4,860	2nd
10	Tuesday, 4 August, 7:10 pm	4.17 (41)	Richmond	12.10 (82)	Lost by 41 points	Away	Metricon Stadium	5,651	2nd
11	Saturday 8 August, 7:40pm	14.12 (96)	Western Bulldogs	11.6 (72)	Won by 24 points	Home	The Gabba	11, 061	2nd
12	Monday 17 August, 7:10pm	7.11 (53)	North Melbourne	8.4 (52)	Won by 1 points	Away	Metricon Stadium	2,722	2nd
13	Sunday, 23 August, 3:35 pm	6.14 (50)	St Kilda	7.6 (48)	Won by 2 points	Home	The Gabba	13,750	2nd
14	BYE								2nd
15	Friday, 4 September, 7:50 pm	6.6 (42)	Collingwood	5.4 (34)	Won by 8 points	Home	The Gabba	15,036	2nd
16	Wednesday, 9 September, 7:10pm	13.10 (88)	Gold Coast	6.7 (43)	Won by 45 points	Home	The Gabba	11,292	2nd
17	Sunday, 13 September, 6:10 pm	11.7 (73)	Sydney	6.5 (41)	Won by 32 points	Away	Cazalys Stadium	3,700	2nd
18	Saturday 19 September, 7:40pm	11.12 (78)	Carlton	10.1 (61)	Won by 17 points	Home	The Gabba	14,563	2nd

==== Finals ====
Match	Date	Score	Opponent	Opponent's Score	Result	Home/Away	Venue	Attendance
Qualifying final	Friday 2 October, 7:50pm	10.9 (69)	Richmond	8.6 (54)	Won by 15 points	Home	The Gabba	22,104
Preliminary final	Saturday 17 October, 6:40pm	6.6(42)	Geelong	11.16 (82)	Lost by 40 points	Home	The Gabba	29,121

=== Awards ===
==== Season Leaders ====
	Player	Number	AFL Rank
Disposals	Lachie Neale	487	1st
Goals	Charlie Cameron	29	8th
Centre Clearances	Lachie Neale	42	5th
Marks	Eric Hipwood	76	39th
Kicks	Jarryd Lyons	249	5th
Tackles	Dayne Zorko	73	23rd
Spoils	Harris Andrews	138	3rd
Hitouts	Oscar McInerney	342	7th

==== League awards ====
===== All-Australian team =====
	Player	Position	Appearance
Named	Harris Andrews	Full Back	2nd
Named	Lachie Neale	Midfield	2nd
Nominated	Hugh McCluggage	-	-

===== 22 Under 22 team =====
	Player	Position	Appearance
Named	Hugh McCluggage	Wing	2nd
Nominated	Zac Bailey	-	-
