= Phil Egan =

Australian rules footballer

Personal information
- Born: 9 February 1963 (age 63)
- Original teams: Assumption College; Robinvale
- Height: 180 cm (5 ft 11 in)
- Weight: 80 kg (176 lb)

Playing career^{1}
Years	Club	Games (Goals)
1982–1990	Richmond	125 (117)
1991	Melbourne	1 (0)
Total		126 (117)
- ^{1} Playing statistics correct to the end of 1991.

Phillip Egan (born 9 February 1963) is a former Australian rules footballer who played for the Richmond Football Club and Melbourne Football Club in the Victorian Football League (VFL).

Egan played 125 games for Richmond from 1982 to 1990, and one game for Melbourne in 1991.

Egan was the author of the 2022 external report on Hawthorn Football Club historical racism allegations.

In February 2023, Egan was arrested on historical fraud charges, stemming from alleged conduct at the Murray Valley Aboriginal Co-operative between 2010 and 2012.
