= Hawthorn Football Club historical racism allegations =

The Hawthorn Football Club historical racism allegations are a set of allegations made in 2022 against the Hawthorn Football Club by former Indigenous players at the club, alleging mistreatment of them and their families. In particular, the club was alleged to have orchestrated efforts to isolate the players from family and partners, and in one case even to encourage a pregnancy termination, to achieve on-field results.

The allegations were made as part of an external review commissioned by the club, and were made public by the ABC on 20 September 2022. An AFL investigation was triggered, and ran until May 2023.

== Background ==
In 2022, the Hawthorn Football Club, a professional Australian rules football club in the Australian Football League, commissioned an external review into the historical treatment of Aboriginal Australian players within the club over the previous decade. Many past and present Indigenous players were interviewed for the report, authored by Richmond and Melbourne past player Phil Egan. The review was conducted by First Nations consultants, and the report was delivered to the club in September 2022.

== Allegations ==
Allegations within the confidential report were obtained and reported by the Australian Broadcasting Corporation on 20 September 2022, four days before the 2022 AFL Grand Final. The testimonies of three families were highlighted; their names were withheld and pseudonyms used in their place.

The most significant allegation was that of a player ("Ian"), after announcing his and his partner's ("Amy") second pregnancy—the first having ended in miscarriage—was taken aside by a group of coaches and told that for the betterment of his career that they should terminate the pregnancy, and he should break up with his partner, change his phone number, and move into an assistant coach's house. The player complied with all requests except for the termination. Over a two-month period, his partner alleged that she was only able to contact the player through club officials, and that she was told that club officials considered her father to be a risk to the player's wellbeing. The pair reconciled, after which the club was alleged to have bullied the couple into moving to an approved suburb, which had the effect of isolating the player's partner from her family. The couple fell pregnant again six months later, and fearful of the club's reaction elected to terminate without advising the club. The couple later broke up, and the player reported having attempted suicide attempts in the aftermath.

A second player ("Zac") alleged a similar circumstance, in which the club advised him to break off his relationship with his seven-weeks-pregnant partner ("Kylie") and change his phone number, for the betterment of his social cohesion with teammates, and ultimately for his career. The player agreed with regret, and alleged that a group of coaches accompanied him home to break up and collect his possessions, and moved him in with an assistant coach. His partner again struggled to contact the player through the club, and she ultimately miscarried. The player left the club at the end of the year and the couple reconciled.

A third player ("Liam") spoke about relocating from interstate to Victoria when drafted to the club at age 18, and his partner then giving birth to their first child one month later. He alleged that the club gave him only a few days' paternity leave, prevented his partner and child from visiting him in Victoria for most of his first season, and told him that he had failed a test by choosing his family over football. The player was delisted after his second season, and had five suicide attempts in the aftermath of his career.

Many Hawthorn officials were alleged to have been involved, but the only ones to have been alleged by name in the ABC report were senior coach Alastair Clarkson, head of football Chris Fagan, and player development manager Jason Burt. The officials involved were not interviewed as part of the external report and deny wrongdoing.

The full report remains confidential. The report is understood to have concluded that the club's current environment as of 2022 was culturally safe, and that allegations were limited to the historical period.

== Reactions and investigation ==
The allegations were met with shock and outrage from the football public. Hawthorn released a statement acknowledging the allegations and its commitment to act upon them.

The AFL referred the report to its Integrity Unit, and announced its own independent investigation, with the panel comprised Bernard Quinn, KC (chair), Jacqualyn Turfrey, Tim Goodwin and Julie Buxton. Not all people interviewed for the original report agreed to take part, with "Amy" most notably declining over disagreements with the review's Terms of Reference. The investigation remains ongoing as of February 2023.

At the time of the release of the allegations, Alastair Clarkson was due to start as new senior coach of North Melbourne in November 2022, and Chris Fagan was senior coach of Brisbane Lions. Both initially stood down — Clarkson announcing an indefinite deferral of his start date, and Fagan taking a leave of absence — to focus on the investigations, but both were reinstated around the start of November 2022.

In February 2023, while the AFL's investigation was ongoing, Phil Egan – author of the original report – was arrested on unrelated historical fraud charges, stemming from alleged conduct at the Murray Valley Aboriginal Co-operative between 2010 and 2012.

In May 2023, Clarkson again stood down from North Melbourne, taking indefinite leave from coaching in the lead-up to what would have been his 400th game as an AFL coach to focus on his physical and emotional wellbeing, with assistant coach Brett Ratten filling in during his absence. Later in May, the eight-month investigation was closed without any findings being made or any charges brought against the club or its officials.

In June 2023, Cam Matthews confirmed that he was the fourth Hawthorn official that was under investigation alongside Alastair Clarkson, Chris Fagan, and Jason Burt. Matthews joined North Melbourne after Clarkson was appointed as the head coach.
