= Daniel Bradshaw =

Australian rules footballer (born 1978)

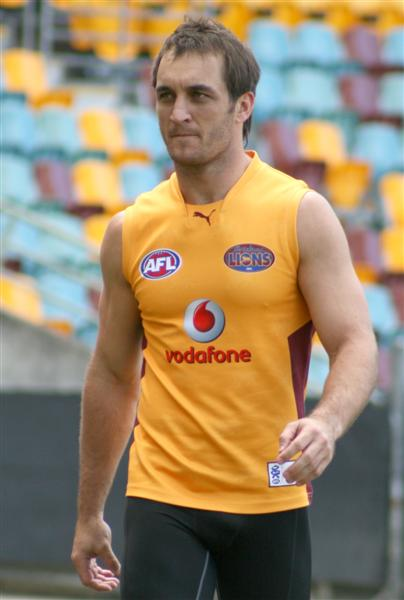
- Bradshaw with the Brisbane Lions in 2008

Personal information
- Full name: Daniel Mark Bradshaw
- Nicknames: Braddy, Big Guns
- Born: 21 November 1978 (age 47)
- Original team: Wodonga (VCFL)
- Draft: No. 56, 1995 National Draft, Brisbane Bears; No. 4, 2010 Pre-Season Draft, Sydney
- Height: 191 cm (6 ft 3 in)
- Weight: 95 kg (209 lb)
- Position: Forward

Playing career^{1}
Years	Club	Games (Goals)
1996	Brisbane Bears	3 (0)
1997–2009	Brisbane Lions	219 (496)
2010–2011	Sydney	9 (28)
Total		231 (524)

Representative team honours
Years	Team	Games (Goals)
2008	Victoria	1 (1)
- ^{1} Playing statistics correct to the end of 2011.

Career highlights
- AFL Premiership player: 2001, 2003; Brisbane leading Goalkicker: 2005, 2006, 2008; AFL Rising Star nominee: 1997

Daniel Mark Bradshaw (born 21 November 1978) is a former Australian rules footballer who played for the Brisbane Bears, Brisbane Lions and Sydney Swans in the Australian Football League (AFL).

Bradshaw is best known as being a dual premiership forward for the Brisbane Lions.

== AFL career ==
=== Brisbane Bears ===
Bradshaw was drafted by the Brisbane Bears in the 1995 National Draft, from Wodonga, at pick 56 in the fourth round. His athleticism and marking was highlighted by recruiters, with the Bears expecting him to become a key-position prospect. Bradshaw made his debut in his first season at the club, in round 18 against Richmond at Optus Oval. He played the next two games off the bench, aged 17, at the same ground.

=== Brisbane Lions ===
In his second year of football, 1997, Bradshaw played seniors for the first time in Round 8 at Subiaco against Fremantle, and dominated kicking four goals, and earning the AFL Rising Star nomination, in his fourth Australian Football League (AFL) match. A week later he booted six goals against Geelong at the Gabba, his first game at home. He played every game for the season since his addition, being a regular goalkicker. He kicked another bag of seven goals against Hawthorn in Round 18 at the Gabba, and four other games of three goals including the Qualifying Final against St Kilda. He finished equal fourth in the Rising Star, and kicked 35 goals for the season in 16 games.

Bradshaw played an inconsistent 1998 season, as the Lions finished last. He kicked 19 goals in 16 appearances, dropped twice during the season to the QSFL.

In 1999, Bradshaw suffered leg stress fractures and missed the entire season.

In 2000, Bradshaw returned to play a terrific season, despite a rough patch before the mid-season break. He kicked 16 goals in the first four-week, including seven against the Western Bulldogs at Colonial Stadium. He kicked 3 goals in his next three matches, all coming against St Kilda, before being dropped. However he replaced Alistair Lynch as a late change to the Round 8 clash against Essendon, but had no gametime. After playing in the reserves where he dominated, he came back into the line-up, playing the rest of the home and away season. In his comeback game he kicked another career-high seven goals against West Coast. He kicked another two bags of five goals for the remainder of the season, finishing with 56 goals at the end of the home and away season, and sat eighth on the table. In his final series, however, in his qualifying final he was contained to one kick, while he pulled out of the semi-final against Carlton to be by the side of wife Angie for a premature birth of son Jake. He polled eight votes in the 2000 Brownlow Medal.

==== 2001 and 2002 ====
In the 2001 season, in which the Lions became Premiers, he kicked another 46 goals in 20 games. An important part to the side, he played at both ends if needed, but with Lynch and Jonathan Brown up forward, he was out of favour at times. He still kicked five goals or more in a match on six occasions, including three games in a row mid-season. He played every final, including the 2001 AFL Grand Final. He continued to struggle in the finals, averaging only three touches in his last four big games.

In 2002 Bradshaw's position as a forward was not secure, and he was used as a utility more often than not. His accurate kicking and mark provided him with 38 goals in 20 games, with eleven goals coming in rounds 2–3. He was dropped just before the finals, but was a late replacement in the Round 21 and 22 games for Craig McRae and Darryl White respectively. He re-injured his knee and missed the finals series and a second consecutive Premiership.

==== 2003 and 2004 ====
After an inconsistent season, 2003 was similar, but Bradshaw missed only two matches, and he was used at centre half-back more than he had been. When placed forward, he kicked six goals in a match twice, early and late in the season. After struggling in the first two finals, he played a good role in the 2003 Grand Final against Collingwood, as Brisbane won its third consecutive Premiership, with Bradshaw involved in two. He kicked 28 goals in 24 matches, and signed another three-year contract till the end of 2006.

In 2004 he played as a utility, but proved in the Final Series, he kicked sixteen goals in the last four games, including three goals in the losing side on Grand Final Day. When required to play forward four games in the season he scored five or more goals including another bag of seven goals, this time against Essendon. He kicked 40 goals in 22 games.

==== 2005 and 2006 ====
Bradshaw was more recognised as a key position player after two successful years, and in 2005 he again played at both ends, despite winning the goalkicking at the club due to the departure of Lynch. He kicked 42 goals, including a then club record, and career high 9 goals against Melbourne at the Gabba. He kicked five goals on two other occasions, but did not play every game.

However, in 2006 he played every game for the year, and kicked a career high 59 goals, playing as a permanent forward. He again dominated Melbourne with an 8-goal performance in Round 14, and kicked 6 goals against Port Adelaide and Essendon.

==== 2007 and 2008 ====
In March 2007 Bradshaw ruptured his Anterior cruciate ligament, and missed the entire season, the second time in his career. This was his first knee reconstruction.

In 2008 he appeared in the Hall of Fame Tribute match, playing for Victoria, and kicking a goal. At the break, he had kicked 47 goals in 12 games, placed 4th behind Matthew Pavlich, Brendan Fevola, and Lance Franklin. 2008 was by far Bradshaw's best season finishing 3rd in the Coleman medal with 75 goals and a bag of 7 in Round 5 against Hawthorn.

==== 2009 ====
In 2009 Bradshaw kicked 58 goals. He kicked a goal after the siren against Essendon to draw the match at the Melbourne Cricket Ground. and impressed in the Elimination Final against Carlton kicking the sealing goal tight on the boundary line in the pocket. On 17 October 2009, Bradshaw denied Brisbane's new contract for him and he put himself up for the AFL Pre-season Draft. Sydney selected Bradshaw with their fourth pick in the pre-season draft.

=== Sydney Swans ===
==== 2010 ====
In the 2010 pre-season draft Bradshaw signed with the Sydney Swans after being selected with their fourth pick. He was given the number 19 guernsey, made famous by Michael O'Loughlin. He played his first game in red and white in Round One against St Kilda. It was a thrilling match, where Bradshaw booted a goal, but failed to make a real impact as the Swans went down by eight points. He had his best game for the Swans in Round 6 against his old club the Brisbane Lions on 1 May 2010, kicking six goals, with several spectacular marks, helping the Swans win and end the round on top of the AFL ladder. Bradshaw injured his knee against Geelong down at Skilled Stadium which kept him out for several weeks, but he returned in the finals against the Western Bulldogs. He provided a quality target up forward but let himself down through some poor kicking for goal, though this was probably due to his bad knee.

==== 2011 ====
After missing the first half of the 2011 season, Bradshaw announced that he was retiring from football after losing his battle with injury following another knee operation. He was the last remaining player from both the Brisbane Bears, and of the Brisbane Lions' inaugural 1997 playing list.

=== 2012 to 2014 ===
In 2012, Bradshaw played for the Howlong Football Club Spiders in the Hume Football League and kicked 105 goals.

In 2013, he moved to the Dederang-Mt Beauty Football Club Bombers in the Tallangatta & District Football League and in round one at Dederang on 6 April 2013, Bradshaw kicked 10 goals against Wodonga Saints and finished with 110 for the season, with his younger brother, Darren kicking 65 goals as well.

In 2014, Bradshaw kicked 69 goals for Dederang-Mt. Beauty Football Club, with the club finishing 6th.

== Statistics ==
Legend
G	Goals	K	Kicks	D	Disposals	T	Tackles
B	Behinds	H	Handballs	M	Marks

Season	Team	No.	Games	Totals							Averages (per game)						
Season	Team	No.	Games	G	B	K	H	D	M	T	G	B	K	H	D	M	T
1996	Brisbane Bears	36	3	0	3	10	9	19	3	2	0.0	1.0	3.3	3.0	6.3	1.0	0.7
1997	Brisbane Lions	36	16	35	13	107	45	152	58	13	2.2	0.8	6.7	2.8	9.5	3.6	0.8
1998	Brisbane Lions	36	16	19	9	86	31	117	57	20	1.2	0.6	5.4	1.9	7.3	3.6	1.3
1999	Brisbane Lions	36	0	—	—	—	—	—	—	—	—	—	—	—	—	—	—
2000	Brisbane Lions	36	19	56	26	129	38	167	91	15	2.9	1.4	6.8	2.0	8.8	4.8	0.8
2001	Brisbane Lions	36	20	46	29	140	50	190	107	19	2.3	1.5	7.0	2.5	9.5	5.4	1.0
2002	Brisbane Lions	36	20	38	21	111	29	140	78	16	1.9	1.1	5.6	1.5	7.0	3.9	0.8
2003	Brisbane Lions	36	24	28	14	172	68	240	127	20	1.2	0.6	7.2	2.8	10.0	5.3	0.8
2004	Brisbane Lions	36	22	40	13	147	65	212	116	25	1.8	0.6	6.7	3.0	9.6	5.3	1.1
2005	Brisbane Lions	36	19	42	21	156	55	211	124	28	2.2	1.1	8.2	2.9	11.1	6.5	1.5
2006	Brisbane Lions	36	22	59	39	211	52	263	159	24	2.7	1.8	9.6	2.4	12.0	7.2	1.1
2007	Brisbane Lions	36	0	—	—	—	—	—	—	—	—	—	—	—	—	—	—
2008	Brisbane Lions	36	20	75	31	166	44	210	118	26	3.8	1.6	8.3	2.2	10.5	5.9	1.3
2009	Brisbane Lions	36	21	58	21	189	51	240	138	20	2.8	1.0	9.0	2.4	11.4	6.6	1.0
2010	Sydney	19	9	28	15	71	22	93	54	6	3.1	1.7	7.9	2.4	10.3	6.0	0.7
Career			231	524	255	1695	559	2254	1230	234	2.3	1.1	7.3	2.4	9.8	5.3	1.0

== See also ==
- After the siren kicks in Australian rules football
