= List of Brisbane Lions leading goalkickers =

The following is a list of Brisbane Lions leading goalkickers in each season of the Australian Football League and AFL Women's.

== AFL ==
Season	Leading goalkicker	Goals
1997	Justin Leppitsch	50
1998	Justin Leppitsch (2)	26
1999	Jarrod Molloy	44
2000	Alastair Lynch	68
2001	Alastair Lynch (2)	58
2002	Alastair Lynch (3)	74
2003	Alastair Lynch (4)	78
2004	Jason Akermanis	44
2005	Daniel Bradshaw	42
2006	Daniel Bradshaw (2)	59
2007	Jonathan Brown	77
2008	Daniel Bradshaw (3)	75
2009	Jonathan Brown (2)	85
2010	Jonathan Brown (3)	53
2011	Mitch Clark	27
2012	Jonathan Brown (4)	47
2013	Jonathan Brown (5)	28
2014	Josh Green	33
2015	Josh Green (2)	25
2016	Josh Walker	23
2016	Dayne Zorko	23
2017	Dayne Zorko (2)	34
2018	Eric Hipwood	37
2019	Charlie Cameron	57
2020	Charlie Cameron (2)	31
2021	Charlie Cameron (3)	55
2022	Charlie Cameron (4)	54
2023	Joe Daniher	61
2024	Joe Daniher (2)	58
2025	Logan Morris	53
2026	Logan Morris (2)	72

Denotes current player

Player	Wins	Seasons
Jonathan Brown	5	2007, 2009, 2010, 2012, 2013
Charlie Cameron	4	2019, 2020, 2021, 2022
Alistair Lynch	4	2000, 2001, 2002, 2003
Daniel Bradshaw	3	2005, 2006, 2008
Josh Green	2	2014, 2015
Justin Leppitsch	2	1997, 1998
Dayne Zorko	2	2016, 2017
Joe Daniher	2	2023, 2024
Logan Morris	2	2025, 2026

== AFL Women's ==
Season	Leading goalkicker	Goals
2017	Kate McCarthy	9
2018	Jess Wuetschner	13
2019	Jess Wuetschner (2)	8
2020	Jesse Wardlaw	9
2021	Dakota Davidson	16
2022 (S6)	Greta Bodey	13
2022 (S7)	Jesse Wardlaw (2)	22
2023	Dakota Davidson (2)	23
2024	Taylor Smith	22
2025	Taylor Smith (2)	18
2026	Dakota Davidson (3)	11

=== Multiple winners ===
Denotes current player

Player	Wins	Seasons
Dakota Davidson	3	2021, 2023, 2026
Taylor Smith	2	2024, 2025
Jesse Wardlaw	2	2020, 2022 (S7)
Jess Wuetschner	2	2018, 2019
