= Chris Fagan (coach) =

Australian rules footballer and coach (born 1961)

- Fagan at the Brisbane Lions' 2025 premiership celebrations

Personal information
- Full name: Christian Fagan
- Nickname: Fages
- Born: 23 June 1961 (age 65); Queenstown, Tasmania
- Height: 170 cm (5 ft 7 in)

Coaching career
Years	Club	Games (W–L–D)
2017–2026	Brisbane Lions	243 (148–93–2)

Career highlights
- 3× AFL premiership coach: 2024, 2025, 2026; 3× All-Australian coach: 2024, 2025, 2026; 3× AFLCA senior coach of the year: 2019, 2024, 2025; 2× TANFL premiership player: 1980, 1988; Tasmanian Football Hall of Fame; Signature

Christian Fagan (born 23 June 1961) is a former Australian rules footballer and coach. He is currently the director of coaching for the Carlton Football Club. He coached the Brisbane Lions to three consecutive premierships in the Australian Football League (AFL) in 2024, 2025 and 2026. Fagan is one of the few VFL/AFL coaches to have never played at the elite level, building his career through coaching and football administration roles.

Fagan's playing career took place entirely in his home state of Tasmania, where he played over 260 games as a midfielder and forward pocket. His career spanned from 1978 to 1990 across various clubs. Fagan began his coaching career with a stint as the inaugural coach of the Tassie Mariners Under 18 team (1995–1997), a role that launched numerous young players into the AFL. After joining Melbourne in 1998 as reserves coach, he became an assistant coach and later the general manager of football operations. At Hawthorn, Fagan was head of coaching and development (2008–2013) and general manager of football operations (2013–2016). He was a key figure in the football department that oversaw the Hawks' four premiership victories.

Fagan was appointed senior coach of the Brisbane Lions in October 2016, making him, at 55, the oldest senior coach to debut in AFL history. He successfully oversaw a rebuild of the playing list, guiding the Lions to their first finals appearance since 2009 in the 2019 season. He led the Lions to three consecutive premierships in the 2024, 2025 and 2026 seasons and is a three-time winner of the Coach of the Year (2019, 2024, 2025), a record for the award. On 29 September 2026, Brisbane's Lord Mayor, Adrian Schrinner, honoured Fagan with the Keys to the City award, which is the highest accolade a city can bestow, symbolising recognition for significant contributions to the community.

== Playing career ==
Fagan was born in Queenstown, Tasmania. He played 263 senior games in the Tasmanian Football League (TFL) with Hobart, Sandy Bay, and Devonport and kicked 430 goals in his career. He represented Tasmania on 11 occasions and played in two premiership teams – Hobart in 1980 and Devonport in 1988.

== Coaching career ==
=== Tasmania ===
Fagan spent two years as an assistant coach at North Hobart before being appointed senior coach of Sandy Bay for 1993 and 1994. He was the inaugural coach of the Tassie Mariners from 1995 to 1997. He was the 181st person to be inducted into the Tasmanian Football Hall of Fame in 2007.

=== Melbourne Football Club assistant coach (1999–2007) ===
Fagan was an assistant coach at the Melbourne Football Club under senior coach Neale Daniher between 1999 and 2007, during which the club reached the 2000 AFL Grand Final, where they lost to Essendon.

=== Hawthorn Football Club assistant coach and general manager of football (2008–2016) ===
He served two roles at the Hawthorn Football Club between 2008 and 2016, where he was instrumental in the club's 2008, 2013, 2014 and 2015 premiership victories. He was head of coaching and development between 2008 and mid-2013, while he was also the general manager of football alongside senior coach Alastair Clarkson between mid-2013 and the end of 2016.

In September 2022, following his departure from the club, he was alleged to have been involved in the isolation and separation of Indigenous players from their partners and families, allegations which came to light as part of an external review into historical racism commissioned by Hawthorn.

=== Brisbane Lions senior coach (2017–2026) ===
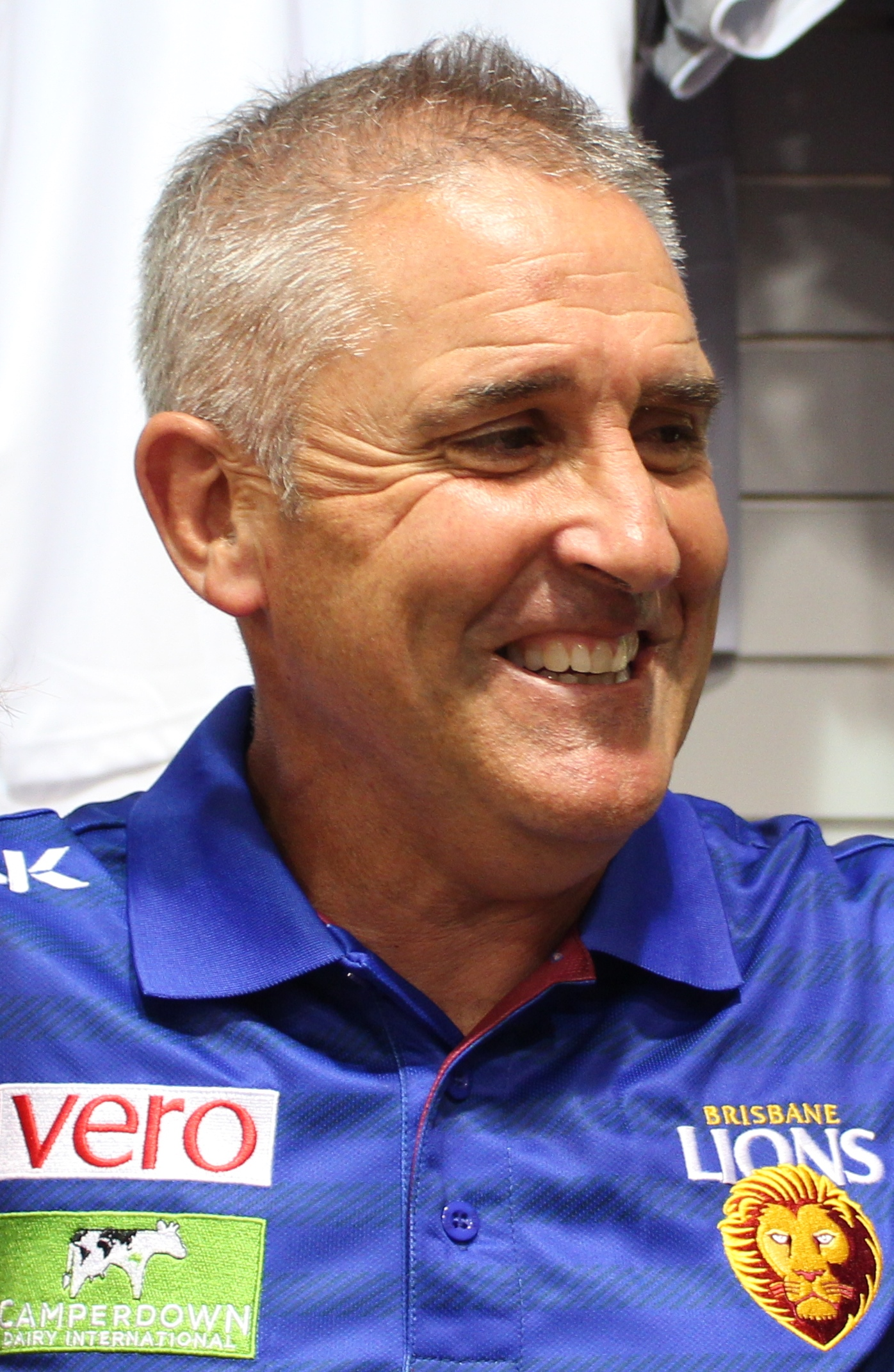
Fagan with the Brisbane Lions in 2016

On 4 October 2016, Fagan was appointed as the senior coach of the Brisbane Lions, replacing Justin Leppitsch. He took the Lions to the finals in his third season as coach and was subsequently honoured by the AFL Coaches Association with the 2019 Allan Jeans Senior Coach of the Year Award, although the Lions lost both their home qualifying and semi-finals to Richmond and Greater Western Sydney. He led the Lions to the finals in the subsequent 2020, 2021 and 2022 seasons, but did not reach the grand final in any of those seasons, falling short in two preliminary finals defeats to the Geelong Cats, and a semi-final defeat to the Western Bulldogs in 2021.

At the start of 2023, Fagan signed a contract extension to keep him at the club until the 2025 season. In the 2023 season, Fagan led a successful finals campaign that saw the Brisbane Lions advance to the 2023 Grand Final against Collingwood, which they lost by four points.

In the 2024 season, after staging the second-highest finals comeback against Greater Western Sydney in the semi-final, coming back from 44 points down, Fagan coached the Brisbane Lions to the 2024 Grand Final, in which they defeated the Sydney Swans by 60 points to win the premiership. In September 2024, his contract was extended again, until the end of the 2026 season.

Fagan led Brisbane to a second consecutive premiership in 2025 after finishing third on the ladder at the conclusion of the home and away season. Brisbane defeated Geelong by 47 points. In the 2026 season, Fagan coached the Brisbane Lions to their sixth premiership in the 2026 AFL Grand Final and third in a row when Brisbane defeated the Fremantle Dockers by a margin of seven points.

With his three premierships at Brisbane, Fagan holds the records as eldest premiership coach in VFL/AFL history at ages 63, 64 and 65; and as the first premiership coach never to have played a match in the VFL/AFL or (when it was the top Victorian league prior to 1897) the VFA.

Following the conclusion of the 2026 AFL season, Fagan stepped down as senior coach of Brisbane Lions. Fagan was then replaced by assistant coach Cameron Bruce as senior coach of Brisbane Lions.

=== Carlton Football Club Director of Coaching (2026–) ===
Fagan was appointed Director of Coaching for the Carlton Football Club on 31 October 2026.

== Senior coaching record ==
Team	Year	Home and Away Season					Finals			
Team	Year	Won	Lost	Drew	Win %	Position	Won	Lost	Win %	Result
BRI	2017	5	17	0	22.7	18th out of 18	—	—	—	—
BRI	2018	5	17	0	22.7	15th out of 18	—	—	—	—
BRI	2019	16	6	0	72.7	2nd out of 18	0	2	0.0	Lost to GWS in Semi Final
BRI	2020	14	3	0	82.4	2nd out of 18	1	1	50.0	Lost to Geelong in Preliminary Final
BRI	2021	15	7	0	68.2	4th out of 18	0	2	0.0	Lost to Western Bulldogs in Semi Final
BRI	2022	15	7	0	68.2	6th out of 18	2	1	66.7	Lost to Geelong in Preliminary Final
BRI	2023	17	6	0	73.9	2nd out of 18	2	1	66.7	Lost to Collingwood in Grand Final
BRI	2024	14	8	1	63.0	5th out of 18	4	0	100.0	Defeated Sydney in Grand Final
BRI	2025	16	6	1	71.7	3rd out of 18	3	1	75.0	Defeated Geelong in Grand Final
BRI	2026	16	7	0	69.6	3rd out of 18	3	1	75.0	Defeated Fremantle in Grand Final
Total		133	84	2	60.7		15	9	62.5	Premierships: 2024, 2025, 2026

== Honours and achievements ==
=== Playing honours ===
==== Team ====
- TANFL premiership player (Hobart): 1980
- TFL Statewide League premiership player (Devonport): 1988

==== Individual ====
- Tasmanian Football Hall of Fame (2007 Inductee)

=== Coaching honours ===
==== Team ====
- AFL Premiership (Brisbane Lions): 2024, 2025, 2026
- McClelland Trophy/Club Championship (Brisbane Lions): 2025

==== Individual ====
- 3× Jock McHale Medal (Brisbane Lions) 2024, 2025, 2026
- 3× AFLCA Allan Jeans Senior Coach of the Year Award: 2019, 2024, 2025
- 3× All-Australian coach 2024, 2025, 2026

Sporting positions
Preceded by Justin Leppitsch	Coach of the Brisbane Lions; 2017–2026	Succeeded by N/A

== Personal life ==
Fagan studied a Bachelor of Education at the University of Tasmania, graduating in 1983.

During his playing and early coaching career, Fagan worked as a teacher, first at Sheffield District High School from 1988 to 1989, and later Dominic College (Primary) from 1990 to 1994.

He married his wife, Ursula, in January 1985. Together, they have two daughters and four grandchildren.
