= Dayne Zorko =

Australian rules footballer

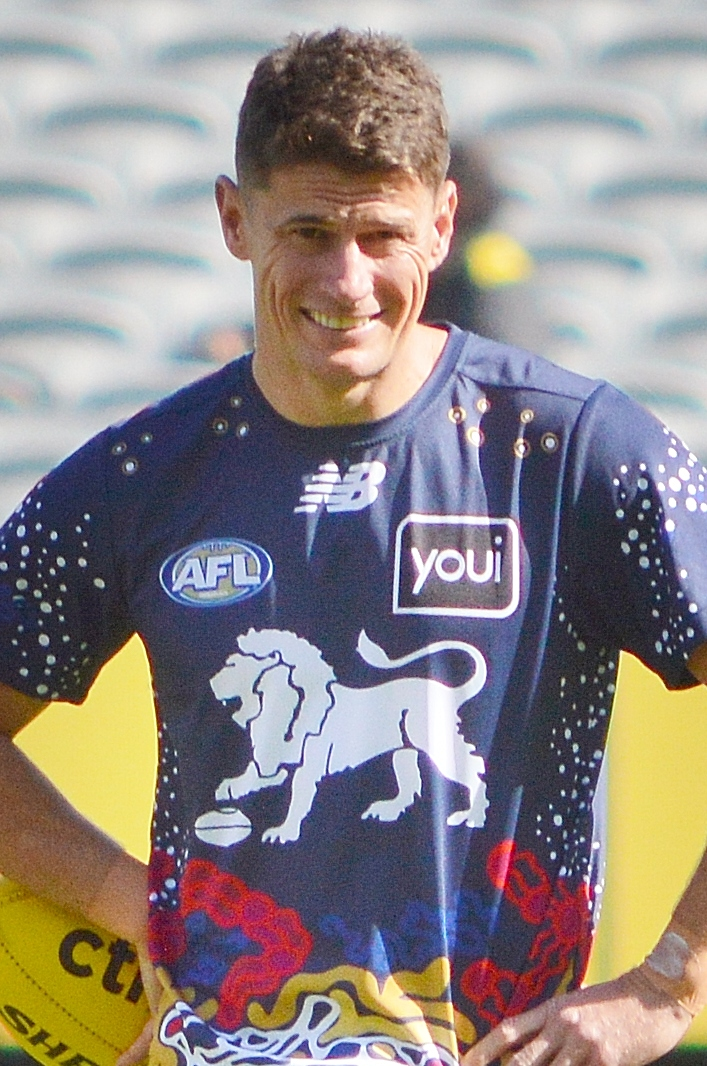
- Zorko pre-match with the Brisbane Lions in 2025

Personal information
- Full name: Dayne Zorko
- Nickname: The Magician
- Born: 9 February 1989 (age 37); Gold Coast, Queensland
- Original team: Broadbeach (NEAFL)
- Draft: 2011 QLD zone selection
- Debut: Round 7, 2012, Brisbane Lions vs. Collingwood, at the Gabba
- Height: 175 cm (5 ft 9 in)
- Weight: 77 kg (170 lb)
- Position: Defender / forward

Playing career^{1}
Years	Club	Games (Goals)
2012–	Brisbane Lions	321 (241)

International team honours^{2}
Years	Team	Games (Goals)
2017	Australia	2 (0)
- ^{1} Playing statistics correct to the end of 2026.^{2} Representative statistics correct as of 2017.

Career highlights
- 3× AFL premiership player: 2024, 2025, 2026; Brisbane Lions captain: 2018–2022; 2× All-Australian team: 2017, 2024; 5× Merrett–Murray Medal: 2015, 2016, 2017, 2018, 2021; 2× Brisbane Lions leading goalkicker: 2016, 2017; 2× Marcus Ashcroft Medal: 2024 (both games)

Dayne Zorko (born 9 February 1989) is a professional Australian rules footballer playing for the Brisbane Lions in the Australian Football League (AFL). Zorko is a three-time premiership player with the Brisbane Lions, and he is a dual All-Australian (becoming the oldest player to receive the honour with his 2024 selection), five-time Merrett–Murray Medallist, and dual Brisbane Lions leading goalkicker. He served as Brisbane Lions captain from 2018 to 2022.

== Early life ==
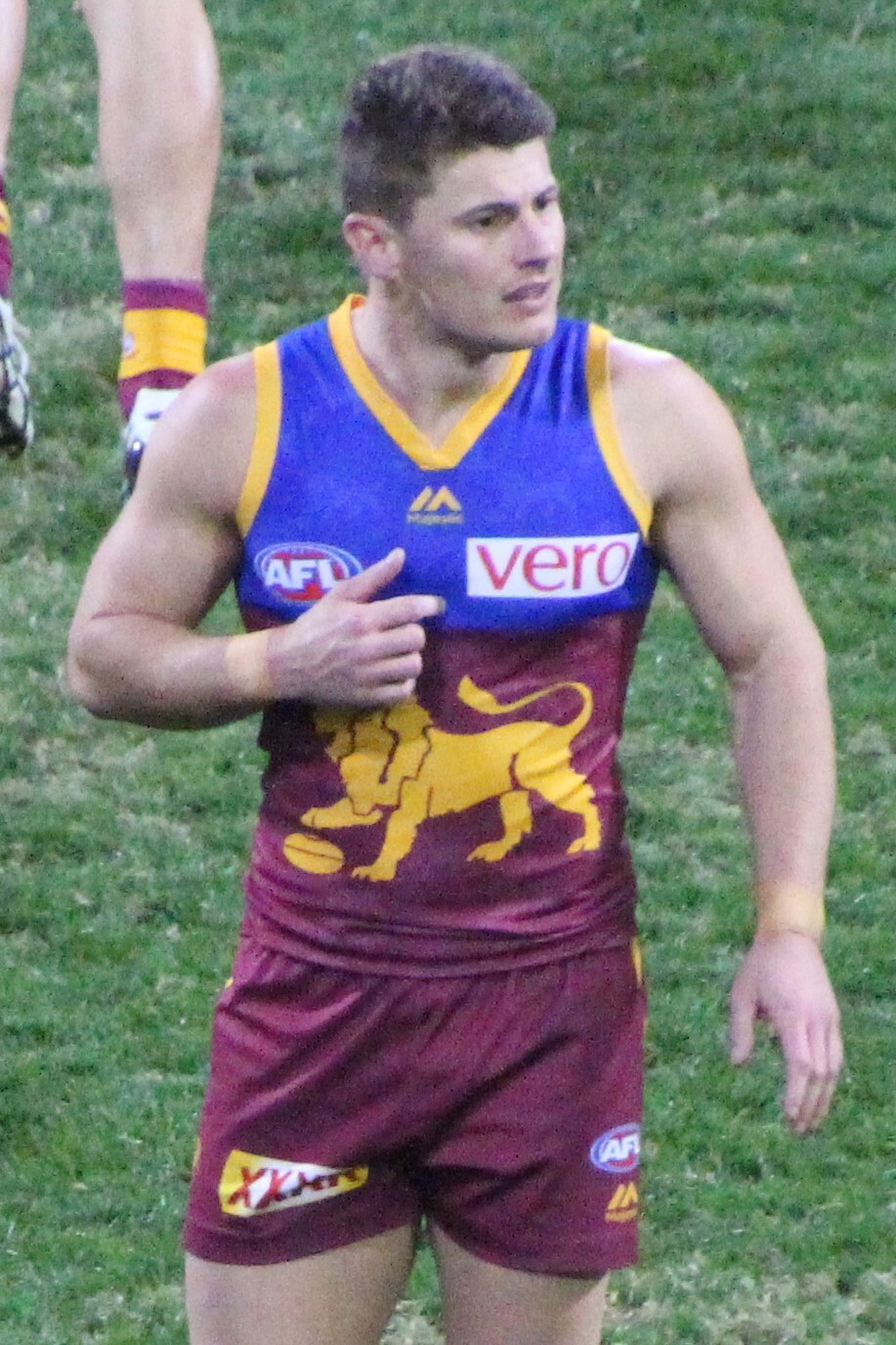
Zorko playing for the Brisbane Lions in 2017

Zorko was born and raised on the Gold Coast, the second youngest of four children. His Slovenian father, a refugee from Yugoslavia who moved with his parents at about six years of age to Melbourne, had developed a passion for the sport before settling on the Gold Coast and having children. His father began coaching the Surfers Paradise Demons and when his five year older brother Beau began playing in the under 8s, Dayne was just 3 years of age. Dayne became a club mascot and began training after complaining that he didn't want to be left at home. He participated in Auskick at Surfers Paradise at the age of four.

Dayne attended Benowa State High School throughout his teenage years. He went on to play more than 250 junior and senior games for Surfers Paradise, which included an under-16 premiership where he played alongside future AFL players Ricky Petterd, Brent Renouf and Jesse White. In 2006 and 2007, he gained the desire to play at elite level and in 2007 switched to Broadbeach for his final year of junior football in pursuit of top level QAFL exposure to increase his AFL draft chances. Zorko captained Queensland during the 2007 AFL Under 18 Championships and was named Queensland's Most Valuable Player during the national carnival, but was overlooked in the 2007 AFL draft. He remained at Broadbeach for the 2008 season and picked up his first senior best-and-fairest award but was again overlooked in the 2008 AFL draft.

In March 2009, the newly formed GC17 consortium invited a then 20-year-old Zorko to train with their under-18 TAC Cup team, which Zorko hoped would lead to a VFL contract with the club for the following season, but Gold Coast's interest waned after two weeks. By the end of the 2010 season, Zorko had amassed three consecutive senior best-and-fairest awards at Broadbeach but still failed to capture the interest of any AFL clubs. He found himself at a crossroad when being offered contracts to play in higher standard state leagues outside of Queensland but eventually decided to stay at Broadbeach for the 2011 NEAFL season. Broadbeach coach Matt Angus knew Zorko had the skills to make it in the AFL but described his professionalism as "nowhere near that" required of an AFL player. At the conclusion of the 2011 season, after winning the NEAFL's Syd Guildford Trophy as the Football Record Player of the Year, along with a fourth consecutive club best-and-fairest with Broadbeach, he was put back on AFL recruiters' radars. Zorko later revealed his reason for staying in Queensland was the hope that the recently established Gold Coast Suns AFL team would draft him with their local access zone concessions. After being overlooked several times, Zorko believed AFL clubs thought he was too short and slow to play in the AFL.

== AFL career ==
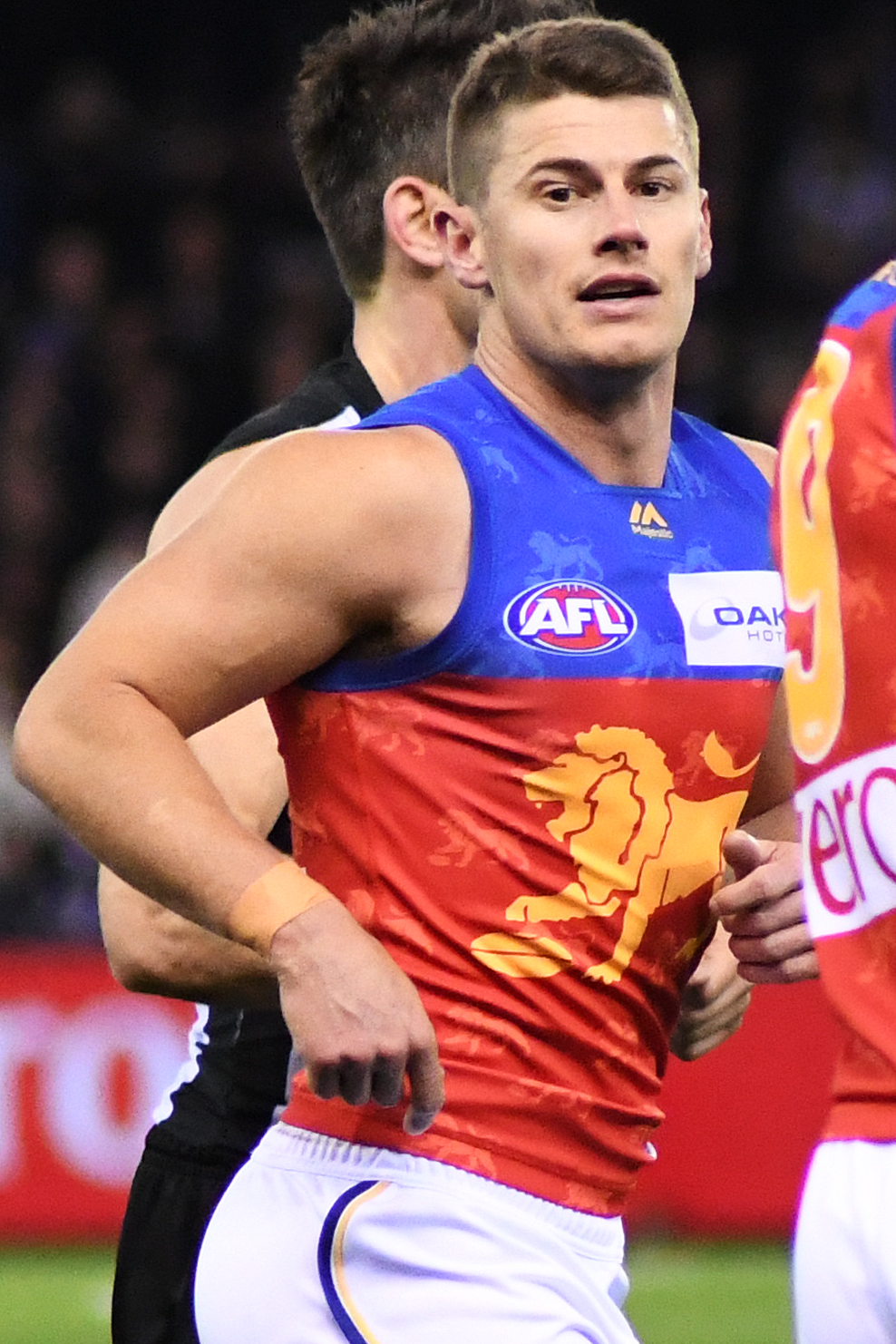
Zorko playing for the Brisbane Lions in 2018

Zorko was recruited by Gold Coast in the 2011 AFL draft as a Queensland zone selection, before being on-traded to the Brisbane Lions. Zorko made his AFL debut against Collingwood at the Gabba in round 7, 2012, and quickly made a name for himself as a small half-forward flank who could kick freakish goals, leading to the nickname "The Magician". He quickly became a cult figure at the Lions despite the team's woes, with Michael Voss being sacked as coach before the end of the 2013 season and the Lions hovering around the lower reaches of the ladder for several seasons.

After a consistent first few seasons, Zorko was named as the joint winner of the Merrett–Murray Medal in 2015 as Brisbane's best-and-fairest, alongside Dayne Beams, Stefan Martin and Mitch Robinson. He went on to also win the award in 2016 and 2017, as well as lead the Lions' goalkicking during those seasons, and was also selected in the 2017 All-Australian team as a half-forward.

Zorko replaced Beams as the Lions' captain during the 2018 season after Beams stepped down from the captaincy for personal reasons, with Harris Andrews taking over as vice-captain from Zorko. His first match as captain was in round 10 against Sydney at the Gabba.

After Brisbane lost to Melbourne in round 23 of the 2022 season, Zorko apologised for an inappropriate comment he made during the game to Melbourne player Harrison Petty, saying in a statement 'I understand I need to be a better leader, and have spoken with the Club who have reinforced this."

Zorko stood down as captain of the Brisbane Lions ahead of the 2023 season. He won the Marcus Ashcroft Medal, awarded to the best on ground in the QClash, for the first time during round 8 of the 2024 season. His performance included a career-high Fantasy score with 40 disposals and 35 kicks.

Zorko was part of the Brisbane Lions 2024 premiership-winning team. Despite no longer being the captain of the club, coach Chris Fagan called Zorko up to the premiership dais to raise the premiership cup with the incumbent co-captains, Harris Andrews and Lachie Neale.

== Statistics ==
Updated to the end of round 22, 2026.

Legend
G	Goals	K	Kicks	D	Disposals	T	Tackles
B	Behinds	H	Handballs	M	Marks
#	Played in that season's premiership team	†	Led the league for the season

Season	Team	No.	Games	Totals							Averages (per game)							Votes
Season	Team	No.	Games	G	B	K	H	D	M	T	G	B	K	H	D	M	T	Votes
2012	Brisbane Lions	15	16	16	14	168	146	314	74	103	1.0	0.9	10.5	9.1	19.6	4.6	6.4	6
2013	Brisbane Lions	15	22	26	27	193	139	332	57	117	1.2	1.2	8.8	6.3	15.1	2.6	5.3	3
2014	Brisbane Lions	15	21	18	16	222	244	466	59	115	0.9	0.8	10.6	11.6	22.2	2.8	5.5	8
2015	Brisbane Lions	15	22	18	11	300	205	505	98	85	0.8	0.5	13.6	9.3	23.0	4.5	3.9	5
2016	Brisbane Lions	15	20	23	16	300	171	471	83	128	1.2	0.8	15.0	8.6	23.6	4.2	6.4	5
2017	Brisbane Lions	15	21	34	27	341	185	526	79	147	1.6	1.3	16.2	8.8	25.0	3.8	7.0	14
2018	Brisbane Lions	15	22	26	18	302	155	457	54	159	1.2	0.8	13.7	7.0	20.8	2.5	7.2	6
2019	Brisbane Lions	15	24	23	19	404	132	536	94	160	1.0	0.8	16.8	5.5	22.3	3.9	6.7	19
2020 (Note: The 2020 season was played with 17 home-and-away matches per team (down from 22) and 16-minute quarters with time on (down from 20-minute quarters with time on) due to the impact of the COVID-19 pandemic.)	Brisbane Lions	15	17	9	15	222	64	286	65	75	0.5	0.9	13.1	3.8	16.8	3.8	4.4	0
2021	Brisbane Lions	15	23	17	18	386	169	555	122	140	0.7	0.8	16.8	7.3	24.1	5.3	6.1	14
2022	Brisbane Lions	15	22	6	9	323	114	437	127	64	0.3	0.4	14.7	5.2	19.9	5.8	2.9	5
2023	Brisbane Lions	15	20	8	8	272	106	378	118	71	0.4	0.4	13.6	5.3	18.9	5.9	3.6	0
2024^{#}	Brisbane Lions	15	27	9	6	566^{†}	145	711	213	86	0.3	0.2	21.0	5.4	26.3	7.9	3.2	12
2025^{#}	Brisbane Lions	15	27	4	7	571^{†}	140	711	185	72	0.1	0.3	21.1	5.2	26.3	6.9	2.7	14
2026^{#}	Brisbane Lions	15	17	4	1	336	89	425	111	34	0.2	0.1	19.8	5.2	25.2	6.5	2.0	0
Career			321	241	212	4906	2204	7110	1539	1556	0.8	0.7	15.2	6.9	22.1	4.8	4.9	111

== Honours and achievements ==
Team

- 3× AFL premiership player (Brisbane Lions): 2024, 2025, 2026
- NAB Cup (Brisbane Lions): 2013
- McClelland Trophy/Club Championship (Brisbane Lions): 2025

Individual

- Brisbane Lions captain: 2018–2022
- 2× All-Australian team: 2017, 2024
- 5× Merrett–Murray Medal: 2015, 2016, 2017, 2018, 2021
- 2× Brisbane Lions leading goalkicker: 2016, 2017
- Australian representative honours in international rules football: 2017
- 2× Marcus Ashcroft Medal: 2024 (both games)
