= Josh Green (footballer) =

Australian rules footballer (born 1992)

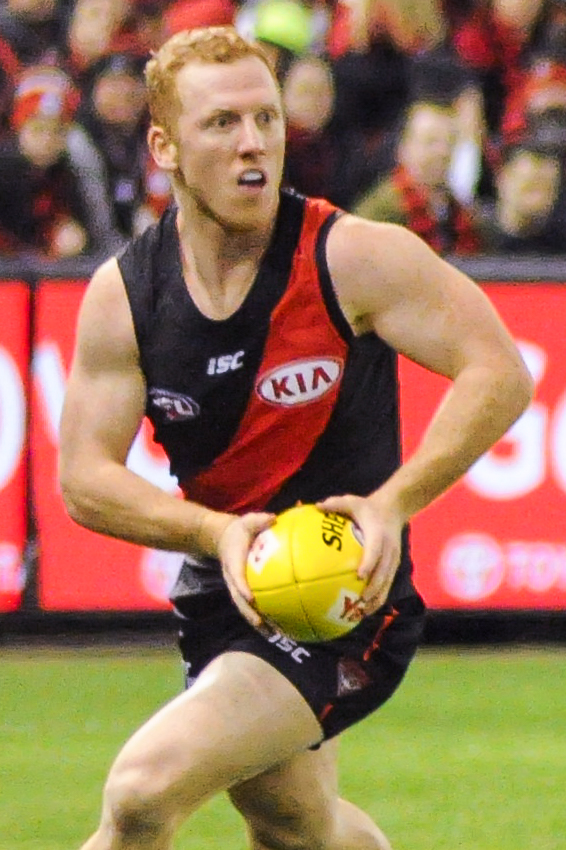
- Green playing for Essendon in June 2017

Personal information
- Full name: Joshua Green
- Nickname: Greeny
- Born: 24 August 1992 (age 34); Hobart, Tasmania, Australia
- Original team: Clarence (SFL)
- Draft: No. 32, 2010 national draft
- Height: 178 cm (5 ft 10 in)
- Weight: 77 kg (170 lb)
- Position: Forward

Playing career^{1}
Years	Club	Games (Goals)
2011–2016	Brisbane Lions	81 (107)
2017–2018	Essendon	24 (25)
Total		105 (132)
- ^{1} Playing statistics correct to the end of 2018.

Career highlights
- TSL premiership player: 2009, 2010; 2× Brisbane leading goalkicker 2014, 2015; SFL premiership player: 2025

Joshua Green (born 24 August 1992) is a former Australian rules footballer who played for the Brisbane Lions and Essendon Football Club in the Australian Football League (AFL).

== Early career ==
Born in Tasmania, Green developed his skills while playing under age football for Sorell. He would later join Clarence. He became a dual premiership player with the club, playing in the 2009 and 2010 premiership teams. In 2010 he won the Davidson Medal as the state's best Under-18 player at the AFL Tasmania State Academy. He captained Tasmania in the national under-18 championships and was named in the 2010 All-Australian Under 18 team.

== AFL career ==
Brisbane Lions drafted him with pick 32 in the 2010 AFL draft. After playing five games in the reserves for the Brisbane Lions, he was selected to play in round 9 of the 2011 AFL season against North Melbourne at the Gabba. He picked up 12 touches in his first game, which was a win for Brisbane against North Melbourne, Brisbane's first win for the season. Green was influential in Brisbane's narrow upset win over ladder leaders West Coast Eagles in round 10 of the 2012 AFL season, having come on in the last quarter as the substitute and kicking three goals and getting a scoring assist. In total he played 12 games in 2012 and scored 15 goals, an improvement over his first season, and in August 2012 he signed a new two-year contract with the Lions. During his time playing for Brisbane he suffered significant online abuse and eventually was diagnosed with and received treatment for severe anxiety.

Green finished the 2014 and 2015 seasons as Brisbane's leading goalkicker, but his 2016 pre-season was interrupted by a broken foot and he only managed to play 11 games during the season. He was delisted by the Lions at the end of the season after failing to negotiate another contract extension with the club. He had played 81 games for Brisbane and scored 107 goals. He subsequently signed with Essendon in November as a delisted free agent.

Green played 17 matches for Essendon in the 2017 season, but his season ended in round 22 when he suffered a broken foot in a match against Gold Coast. He signed another contract with Essendon for 2018. In March 2018 Green was reported for staging to try to get a free kick in a JLT Series match against Geelong. Geelong player Mitch Duncan hit him in the chest with his elbow, after which Green fell to his knees and clutched his face. He became the first person in AFL history to be fined for staging when the AFL Tribunal fined him $1,000. Green's 2018 season was again injury-interrupted due to hamstring issues and he spent most of the season playing for Essendon's reserves team in the VFL. In the last part of the season, Green's feet were in severe pain due to bolts which had been put in his feet after repeated stress fractures. In order to be able to play Green had to have cortisone injections for the pain. He was delisted by the club in September but played out the finals series for the reserves.

== Statistics ==
Statistics are correct to the end of the 2018 season

Legend
G	Goals	K	Kicks	D	Disposals	T	Tackles
B	Behinds	H	Handballs	M	Marks

Season	Team	No.	Games	Totals							Averages (per game)						
Season	Team	No.	Games	G	B	K	H	D	M	T	G	B	K	H	D	M	T
2011	Brisbane Lions	42	5	0	3	32	24	56	6	17	0.0	0.6	6.4	4.8	11.2	1.2	3.4
2012	Brisbane Lions	6	12	15	8	83	53	136	20	25	1.3	0.7	6.9	4.4	11.3	1.7	2.1
2013	Brisbane Lions	6	17	24	6	113	63	176	32	53	1.4	0.4	6.6	3.7	10.4	1.9	3.1
2014	Brisbane Lions	6	20	33	13	155	95	250	39	48	1.7	0.7	7.8	4.8	12.5	2.0	2.4
2015	Brisbane Lions	6	16	25	12	123	74	197	41	56	1.6	0.8	7.7	4.6	12.3	2.6	3.5
2016	Brisbane Lions	6	11	10	12	95	52	147	23	32	0.9	1.1	8.6	4.7	13.4	2.1	2.9
2017	Essendon	15	17	17	21	123	63	186	37	52	1.0	1.2	7.2	3.7	10.9	2.2	3.1
2018	Essendon	15	7	8	6	44	23	67	12	6	1.1	0.9	6.3	3.3	9.6	1.7	2.6
Career			105	132	81	768	447	1215	210	301	1.3	0.8	7.3	4.3	11.6	2.0	2.9
