= Mitch Hinge =

Australian rules footballer

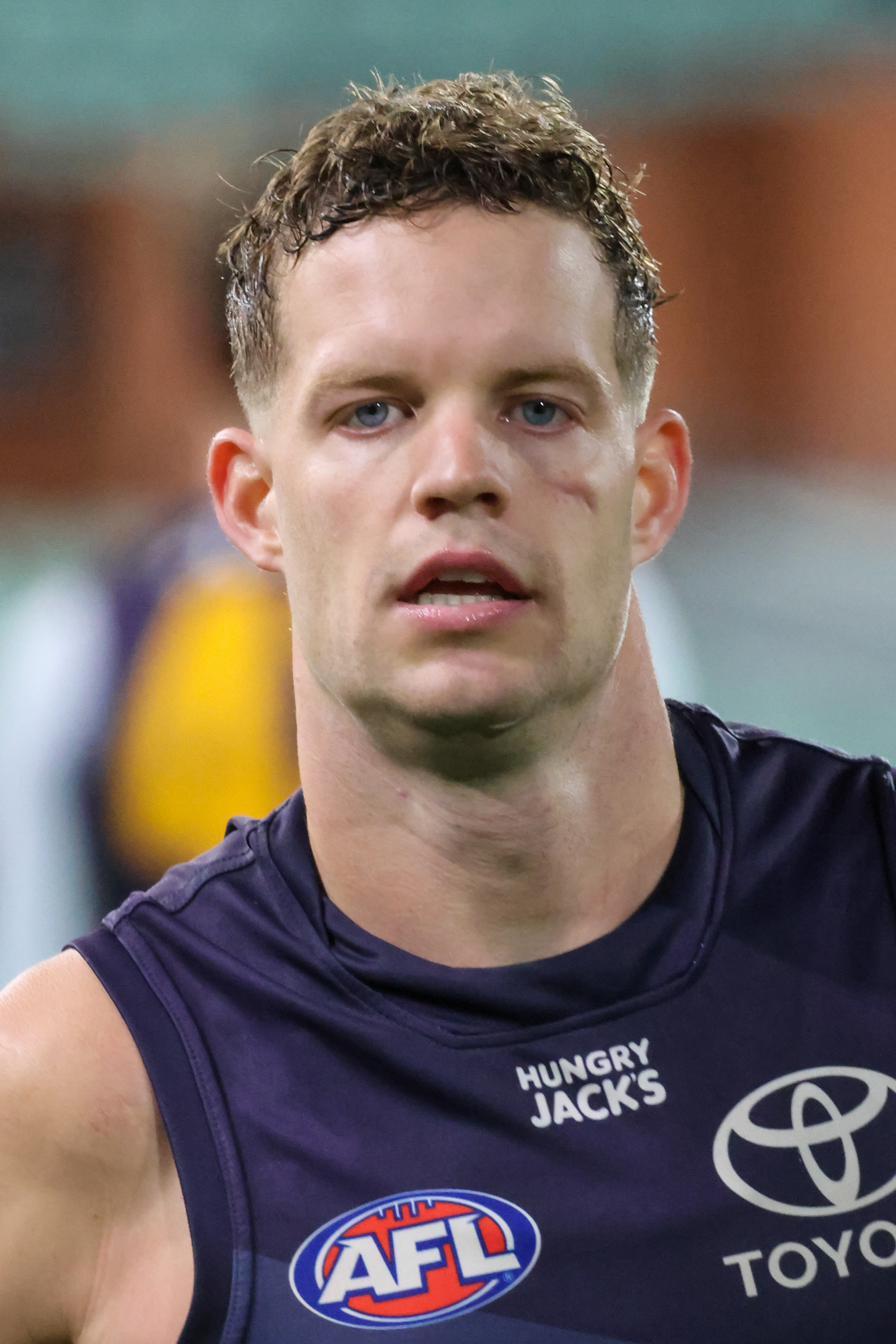
- Hinge with Adelaide in 2026

Personal information
- Full name: Mitchell Hinge
- Born: 26 June 1998 (age 28); Mundulla, South Australia
- Original teams: Glenelg (SANFL); Mundulla (KNTFL)
- Draft: No. 20, 2017 rookie draft
- Debut: Round 9, 2019, Brisbane Lions vs. Adelaide, at The Gabba
- Height: 187 cm (6 ft 2 in)
- Weight: 84 kg (185 lb)
- Position: Defender

Club information
- Current club: Adelaide
- Number: 20

Playing career^{1}
Years	Club	Games (Goals)
2017–2020	Brisbane Lions	3 (1)
2021–	Adelaide	87 (7)
Total		90 (8)
- ^{1} Playing statistics correct to the end of round 22, 2026.

Mitchell Hinge (born 26 June 1998) is a professional Australian rules footballer playing for the Adelaide Crows in the Australian Football League (AFL). He previously played for the Brisbane Lions and was drafted by Brisbane from Glenelg with the 20th selection in the 2017 rookie draft prior to the 2017 AFL season.

One of six children, he is the brother of former Adelaide player John Hinge. He grew up in Mundulla on the Limestone Coast.

== AFL career ==
=== Brisbane ===
Hinge made his debut in the win against Adelaide at The Gabba in round nine of the 2019 season, following a string of strong performances in the North East Australian Football League (NEAFL) playing for Brisbane's reserves team. Hinge won two NEAFL premierships with the Lions in 2017 and 2019. After only 3 games between 2017 and the COVID-19-affected 2020 for Brisbane, Hinge was delisted by the club.

=== Adelaide ===
The Adelaide Crows, who had interest in the South Australian, signed Hinge as a delisted free agent prior to the 2021 AFL season. Hinge was one of three Crows to debut in the opening game of the 2021 season, which resulted in the biggest upset in Adelaide's history against Geelong at the Adelaide Oval. Unfortunately, Hinge severely injured his shoulder during the game, and did not recover in time to play again that year.

Prior to the 2024 AFL season, Hinge joined Adelaide's leadership group as one of the senior players of the club following his breakout season. He was relieved of the role the following year as the club shifted to a more refined leadership group, despite the defender averaging a career-high 22 disposals. During round 7 of 2025 against Fremantle, Hinge struck opposition midfielder Andrew Brayshaw, resulting in a one-game suspension.

Hinge experienced an interrupted start to his 2026 campaign, as a pre-season injury kept him on the sidelines until the round five match against Carlton. In his return game, he suffered a hamstring strain, ruling him out for a month of football.

== Personal life ==
As of April 2026, Hinge is dating the sister of Hawthorn player Will McCabe.

== Statistics ==
Updated to the end of round 22, 2026.

Legend
G	Goals	K	Kicks	D	Disposals	T	Tackles
B	Behinds	H	Handballs	M	Marks

Season	Team	No.	Games	Totals							Averages (per game)							Votes
Season	Team	No.	Games	G	B	K	H	D	M	T	G	B	K	H	D	M	T	Votes
2017	Brisbane Lions	42	0	—	—	—	—	—	—	—	—	—	—	—	—	—	—	0
2018	Brisbane Lions	42	0	—	—	—	—	—	—	—	—	—	—	—	—	—	—	0
2019	Brisbane Lions	22	2	1	0	16	12	28	6	3	0.5	0.0	8.0	6.0	14.0	3.0	1.5	0
2020 (Note: The 2020 season was played with 17 home-and-away matches per team (down from 22) and 16-minute quarters with time on (down from 20-minute quarters with time on) due to the impact of the COVID-19 pandemic.)	Brisbane Lions	22	1	0	0	10	3	13	2	3	0.0	0.0	10.0	3.0	13.0	2.0	3.0	0
2021	Adelaide	20	1	0	0	6	1	7	3	0	0.0	0.0	6.0	1.0	7.0	3.0	0.0	0
2022	Adelaide	20	17	3	2	162	90	252	67	46	0.2	0.1	9.5	5.3	14.8	3.9	2.7	0
2023	Adelaide	20	22	1	4	313	119	432	104	46	0.0	0.2	14.2	5.4	19.6	4.7	2.1	0
2024	Adelaide	20	22	2	3	317	168	485	107	55	0.1	0.1	14.4	7.6	22.0	4.9	2.5	0
2025	Adelaide	20	24	1	1	264	110	374	99	64	0.0	0.0	11.0	4.6	15.6	4.1	2.7	0
2026	Adelaide	20	1	0	0	6	4	10	1	1	0.0	0.0	6.0	4.0	10.0	1.0	1.0	0
Career			90	8	10	1094	507	1601	389	218	0.1	0.1	12.2	5.6	17.8	4.3	2.4	0
