= Eric Hipwood =

Australian rules footballer

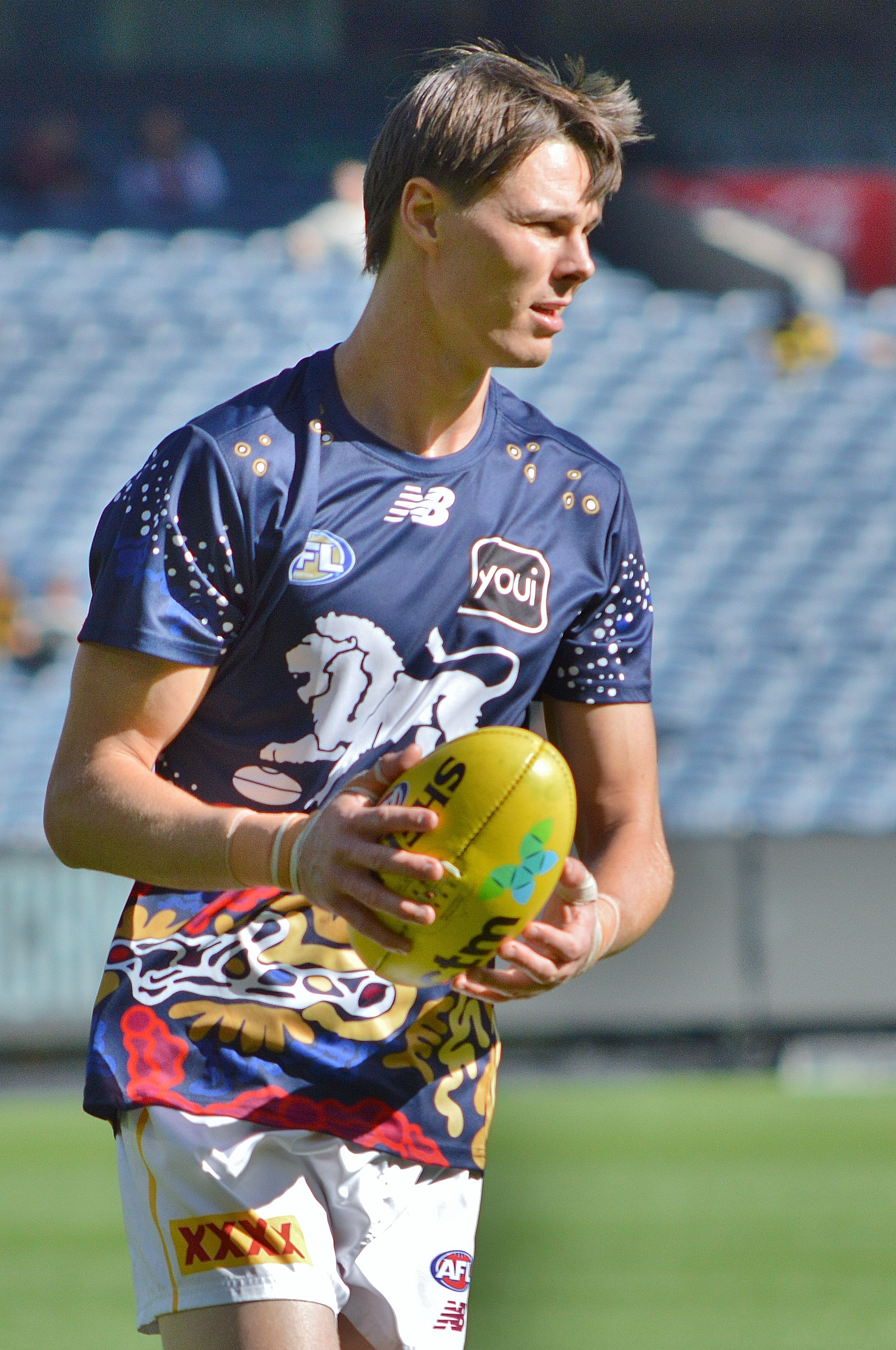
- Hipwood in April 2025

Personal information
- Full name: Eric Hipwood
- Nicknames: Eel, Hippy
- Born: 13 September 1997 (age 29); St Kilda, Victoria
- Original teams: Caloundra (QFA); Aspley (NEAFL); Brisbane Lions Academy
- Draft: No. 14 (Academy selection), 2015 AFL national draft
- Height: 200 cm (6 ft 7 in)
- Weight: 94 kg (207 lb)
- Position: Key Forward

Club information
- Current club: Brisbane Lions
- Number: 30

Playing career^{1}
Years	Club	Games (Goals)
2016–	Brisbane Lions	211 (304)
- ^{1} Playing statistics correct to the end of round 22, 2026.

Career highlights
- 2x AFL premiership player: 2024, 2026; Brisbane Lions leading goalkicker: 2018; AFL Rising Star nominee: 2017; 3x 22under22 Team: (2017, 2018, 2019)

Eric Hipwood (born 13 September 1997) is a professional Australian rules footballer playing for the Brisbane Lions in the Australian Football League (AFL). Primarily a key forward, Hipwood is a premiership player and leading goalkicker for the club.

== Early life ==
Hipwood was born in Melbourne's inner suburb of St Kilda. His parents were passionate St Kilda Saints fans who had married in the stands of Moorabbin Oval prior to his birth. His grandfather, Ken, was instrumental in establishing the Aspley Football Club in Brisbane's northern suburbs and his father, Brad, was a former senior player for Aspley. His grandparents are also life members of the Aspley Football Club. At the age of three, Eric moved to his father's home state of Queensland and settled on the Sunshine Coast with his family where he began playing junior football for Kawana Park at the age of eight.

At 13 years of age he was placed in the Brisbane Lions Academy and switched allegiances to the Caloundra Panthers. Two years later, at the age of 15, he played his first QFA senior match for Caloundra in their away clash against Aspley and kicked three goals on debut. In his final year of junior football he switched clubs again and played for Aspley in the North East Australian Football League (NEAFL). Hipwood was selected to represent Queensland at the 2015 AFL Under 18 Championships and was named in the All Australian team for his performances. He was then invited to attend the AFL Draft Combine in November 2015.

== AFL career ==
Hipwood was drafted by the Brisbane Lions with their second selection and fourteenth overall in the 2015 national draft as an academy selection after Brisbane matched Richmond's bid on him. He made his AFL debut in the 49 point loss against West Coast at the Gabba in round 13 of the 2016 season. After the 32 point loss against the Western Bulldogs at Etihad Stadium in round five of the 2017 season, in which he recorded twelve disposals, five marks, four tackles and three goals, he was the round nominee for the AFL Rising Star.

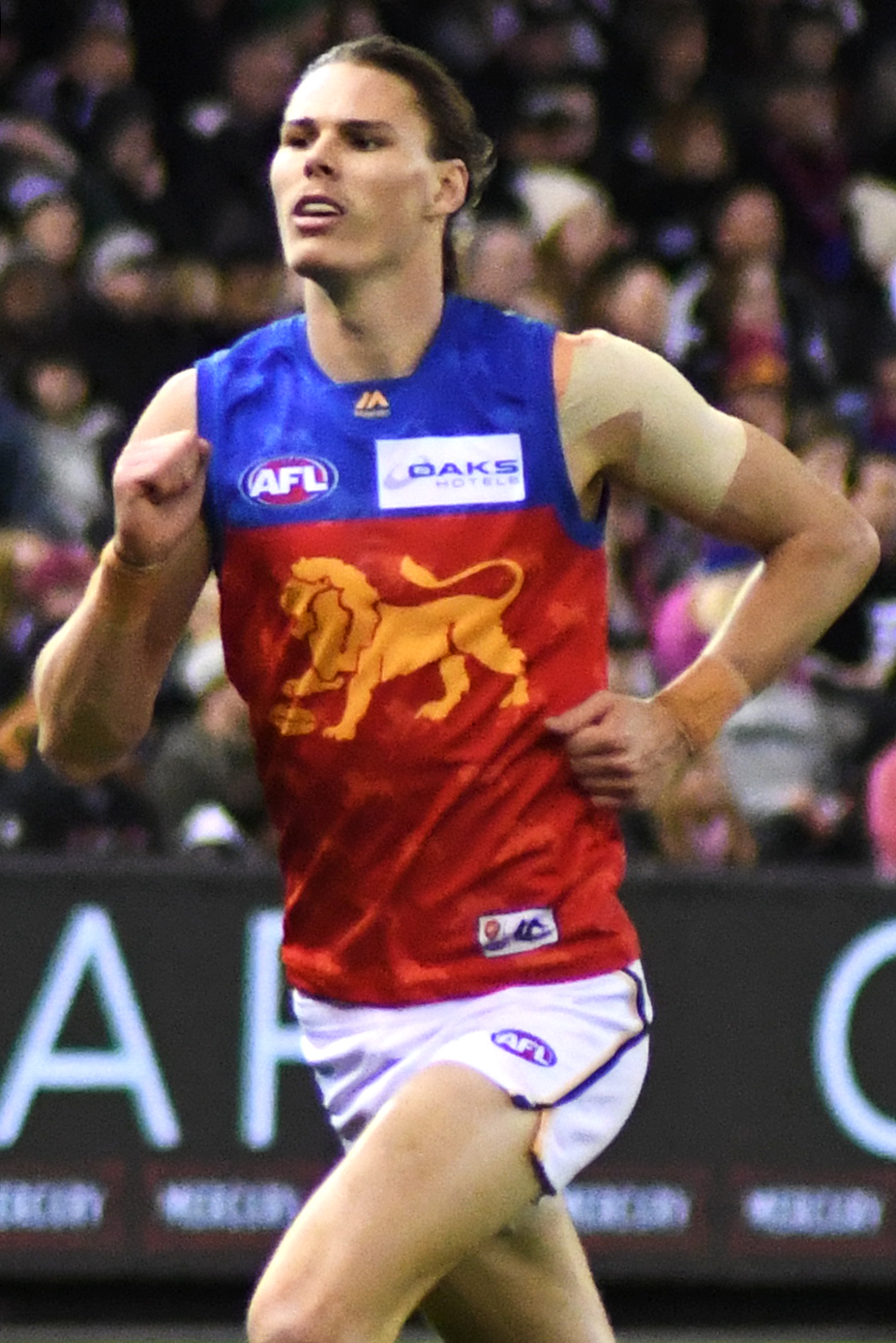
Hipwood in August 2018

Hipwood played all 22 matches of the 2018 season. With 37 goals, he was Brisbane's leading goalkicker for the year. In round 16, Hipwood kicked 6 goals in Brisbane's win against Carlton. Hipwood received three Brownlow Medal votes in both this game and the round 9 win against Hawthorn.

2019 saw Hipwood play 23 games including finals with 35 goals kicked for the year. He signed a contract extension, keeping him at Brisbane until at least the end of 2023.

In 2021, Hipwood ruptured his ACL in the round 17 match against St Kilda. He would go on to miss Brisbane's finals series, and only returned 10 months later for a 2022 match against Adelaide. After Hipwood led the Lions in goals during the 2022 finals series, he extended his contract with the club for six additional years, making the signature Brisbane's longest contract since Alastair Lynch in 1994.

Hipwood was suspended for one game during the round 10 clash against Richmond for a dangerous tackle against Nick Vlastuin. Vlastuin was also fined for striking back at Hipwood. The Lions forward returned from suspension and had a career-best game in round 13 against the Western Bulldogs, kicking a personal-best six goals. Hipwood was a part of the Brisbane's 2024 premiership winning team, kicking a goal in a 60 point victory over the Sydney Swans. His goal, a miraculous left-foot goal from the pocket, was celebrated with an imitation of club legend Jason Akermanis. Following the premiership, Hipwood revealed that he played the finals series through an injury.

== Statistics ==
Updated to the end of round 22, 2026.

Legend
G	Goals	K	Kicks	D	Disposals	T	Tackles
B	Behinds	H	Handballs	M	Marks
#	Played in that season's premiership team

Season	Team	No.	Games	Totals							Averages (per game)							Votes
Season	Team	No.	Games	G	B	K	H	D	M	T	G	B	K	H	D	M	T	Votes
2016	Brisbane Lions	30	10	11	16	60	35	95	30	11	1.1	1.6	6.0	3.5	9.5	3.0	1.1	0
2017	Brisbane Lions	30	20	30	16	124	48	172	59	25	1.5	0.8	6.2	2.4	8.6	3.0	1.3	2
2018	Brisbane Lions	30	22	37	27	176	57	233	93	24	1.7	1.2	8.0	2.6	10.6	4.2	1.1	6
2019	Brisbane Lions	30	23	35	29	182	51	233	107	42	1.5	1.3	7.9	2.2	10.1	4.7	1.8	6
2020 (Note: The 2020 season was played with 17 home-and-away matches per team (down from 22) and 16-minute quarters with time on (down from 20-minute quarters with time on) due to the impact of the COVID-19 pandemic.)	Brisbane Lions	30	19	24	19	147	40	187	79	17	1.3	1.0	7.7	2.1	9.8	4.2	0.9	1
2021	Brisbane Lions	30	16	26	20	118	51	169	79	20	1.6	1.3	7.4	3.2	10.6	4.9	1.3	1
2022	Brisbane Lions	30	17	25	17	125	49	174	79	18	1.5	1.0	7.4	2.9	10.2	4.6	1.1	0
2023	Brisbane Lions	30	26	41	29	200	57	257	140	49	1.6	1.1	7.7	2.2	9.9	5.4	1.9	1
2024^{#}	Brisbane Lions	30	24	33	21	193	66	259	134	31	1.4	0.9	8.0	2.8	10.8	5.6	1.3	4
2025	Brisbane Lions	30	22	25	18	169	62	231	107	32	1.1	0.8	7.7	2.8	10.5	4.9	1.5	0
2026	Brisbane Lions	30	8	9	4	56	24	80	30	10	1.1	0.5	7.0	3.0	10.0	3.8	1.3	0
Career			207	296	216	1550	540	2090	937	279	1.4	1.0	7.5	2.6	10.1	4.5	1.3	21

== Honours and achievements ==
Team

- AFL premiership player: 2024

Individual

- Brisbane Lions leading goalkicker: 2018 (37)
- 3× 22under22 team: 2017, 2018, 2019
- AFL Rising Star nominee: 2017 (round 5)
