= Cedric Cox (footballer) =

Australian rules footballer

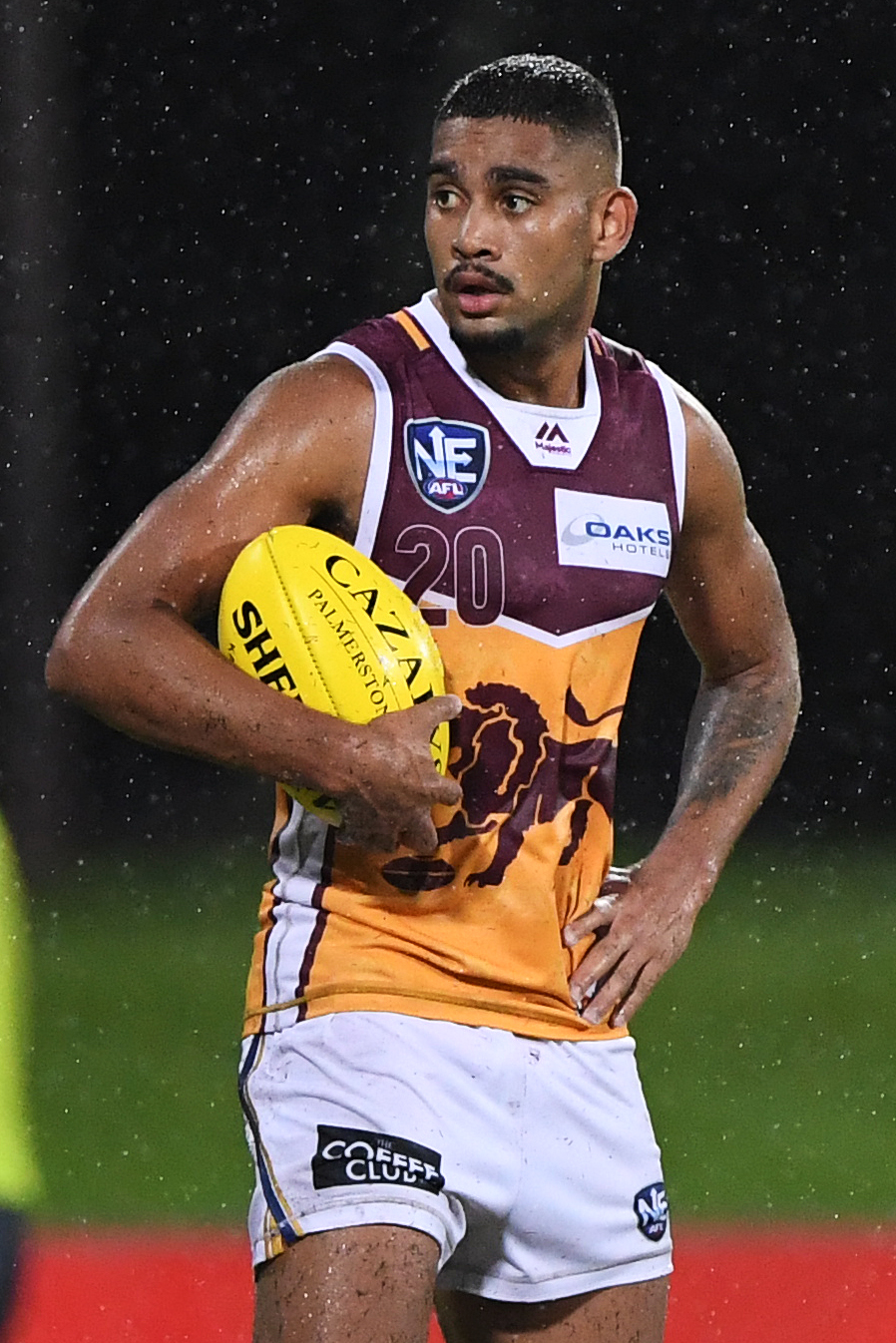
- Cox in April 2019

Personal information
- Full name: Cedric Cox
- Born: 19 August 1997 (age 29)
- Original team: North Ballarat Rebels (TAC Cup)
- Draft: No. 24, 2016 national draft
- Debut: Round 4, 2017, Brisbane Lions vs. Richmond, at the Gabba
- Height: 181 cm (5 ft 11 in)
- Weight: 79 kg (174 lb)
- Position: Defender / midfielder

Club information
- Current club: Brisbane Lions
- Number: 20

Playing career^{1}
Years	Club	Games (Goals)
2017–2020	Brisbane Lions	13 (3)
- ^{1} Playing statistics correct to the end of 2018.

Cedric Cox (born 19 August 1997) is a professional Australian rules footballer who last played for the Brisbane Lions in the Australian Football League (AFL).

== Early life ==
Cox was raised in Halls Creek, Western Australia and played junior football with Halls Creek. He moved to Camperdown, Victoria and played with the North Ballarat Rebels.

== AFL career ==
He was drafted by the Brisbane Lions with their fourth selection and twenty-fourth overall in the 2016 national draft. He made his debut in the fifty-two point loss against Richmond at the Gabba in round four of the 2017 season. On 24 May 2017, it was announced that he would wear number 67 on his jersey, rather than his usual 20, for the round 10 Sir Doug Nicholls Indigenous Round game against Collingwood. This was to commemorate the 1967 referendum (which allowed Indigenous Australians to be counted with the general population in the census and thus be treated separately in legislation). However, he was not picked to play in the game.

After the conclusion of the 2020 AFL season, Cox requested a trade to Western Australia but was delisted by the Lions.

== Statistics ==
Statistics are correct to 2020

Legend
G	Goals	K	Kicks	D	Disposals	T	Tackles
B	Behinds	H	Handballs	M	Marks

Season	Team	No.	Games	Totals							Averages (per game)						
Season	Team	No.	Games	G	B	K	H	D	M	T	G	B	K	H	D	M	T
2017	Brisbane Lions	20	8	1	0	46	45	91	25	19	0.1	0.0	5.7	5.7	11.4	3.1	2.4
2018	Brisbane Lions	20	4	2	0	15	25	40	8	7	0.5	0.0	3.7	6.2	10.0	2.0	1.8
2019	Brisbane Lions	20	1	-	-	6	3	9	4	2	-	-	6.0	3.0	9.0	4.0	2.0
2020	Brisbane Lions	20	-	-	-	-	-	-	-	-	-	-	-	-	-	-	-
Career			13	3	0	67	73	140	37	28	0.2	0.0	5.15	5.62	10.77	2.85	2.15
