= Archie Smith (footballer, born 1995) =

Australian rules footballer

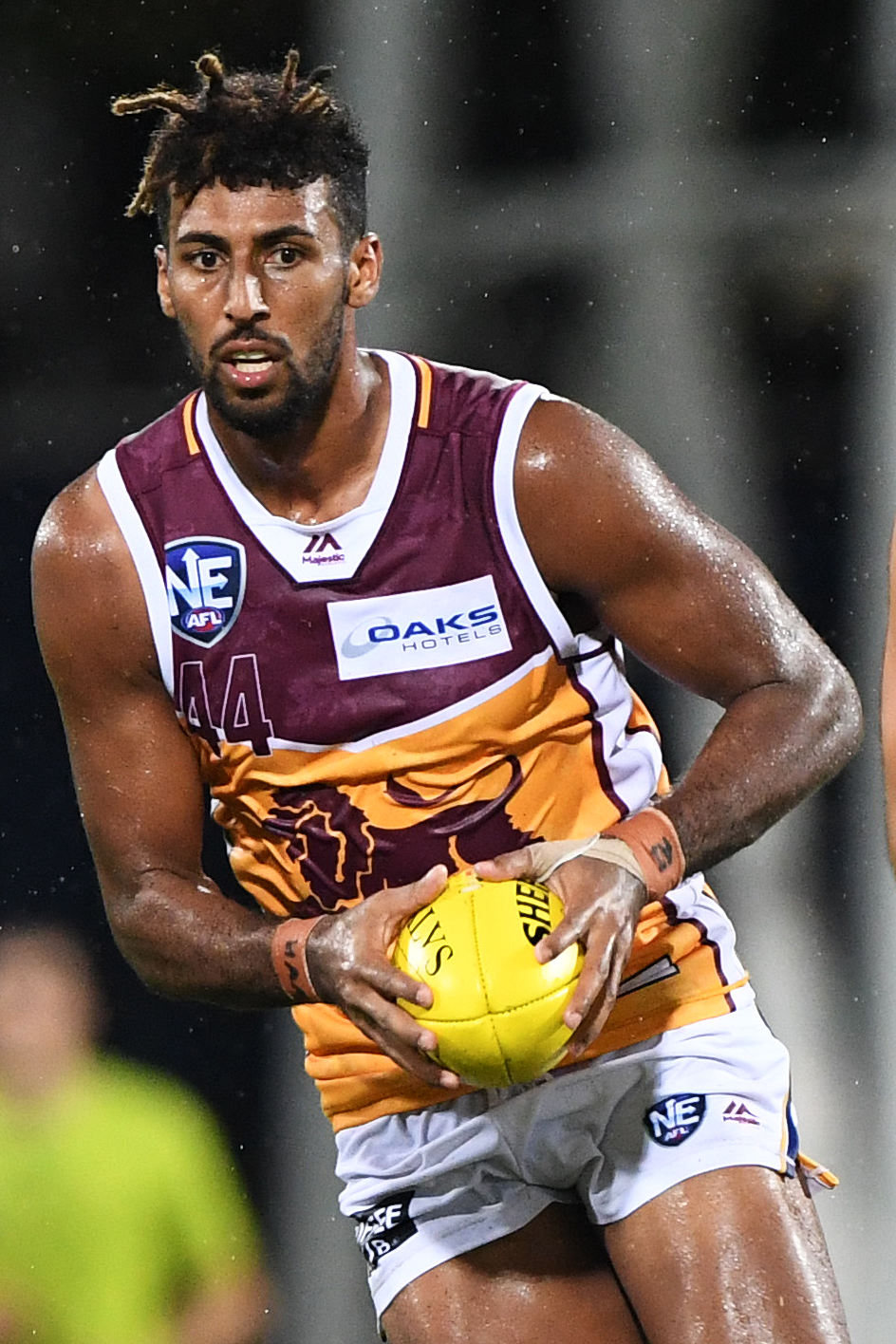
- Smith in April 2019

Personal information
- Full name: Archibald Smith
- Nicknames: Archie, Arch
- Born: 19 July 1995 (age 31); Brisbane, Australia
- Original team: Mount Gravatt (NEAFL)
- Draft: No. 69, Academy selection, 2014 rookie draft
- Debut: Round 19, 2016, Brisbane Lions vs. Port Adelaide, at the Gabba
- Height: 202 cm (6 ft 8 in)
- Weight: 105 kg (231 lb)
- Position: Ruckman

Playing career^{1}
| Years | Club | Games (Goals) |
| 2014–2021 | Brisbane Lions | 16 (4) |
- ^{1} Playing statistics correct to the end of Round 18, 2020.

Career highlights
- 3x NEAFL premiership player (Brisbane Lions reserves): 2013, 2017, 2019

Archibald Smith (born 19 July 1995) is a former Australian rules footballer who played for the Brisbane Lions in the Australian Football League (AFL).

== Early life ==
Smith was born in Brisbane on 19 July 1995, the son of former NBA and NBL basketball player Andre Moore. Smith himself played junior basketball at an elite level and was courted by multiple Division One colleges in the United States before being scouted by AFL recruiters at the age of 17. Despite having no prior Australian rules football experience, Smith drew interest from recruiters due to his supreme athleticism for his size. He attended St Laurence's College in South Brisbane throughout his teenage years.

== Football career ==
Smith was drafted by the Brisbane Lions with their third selection and sixty-ninth overall in the 2014 rookie draft as an Academy selection. He made his debut against Port Adelaide in round 19, 2016 in a near best-on-ground performance, gathering 19 disposals and 30 hit outs at the Gabba.

Smith won three premierships with the Lions in the North East Australian Football League (NEAFL) in 2013, 2017 and 2019. Following the win over Southport in the 2019 NEAFL grand final, he became the first (and subsequently only) player to win three flags at NEAFL level.

== Personal life ==
Smith is one of 6 children, with siblings Gemma, Sebastian, Isaac, Abib and Violet. In November 2020, Archie's brother, Sebastian, died by suicide at the age of 21. Subsequently, before every game, Smith wrote his late brother's name on his wrist as a motivational tribute. Smith also advocated for suicide prevention in his brother's memory as an ambassador for Lifeline Australia.

Smith announced his retirement from the AFL at the end of the 2021 season, citing a desire to prioritise mental well-being and family. He married his longtime partner Sophie in October 2021, and the couple welcomed their first child, Montgomery, in April 2022, and second child, Lincoln in September 2024.
