= Matt Eagles =

Australian rules footballer

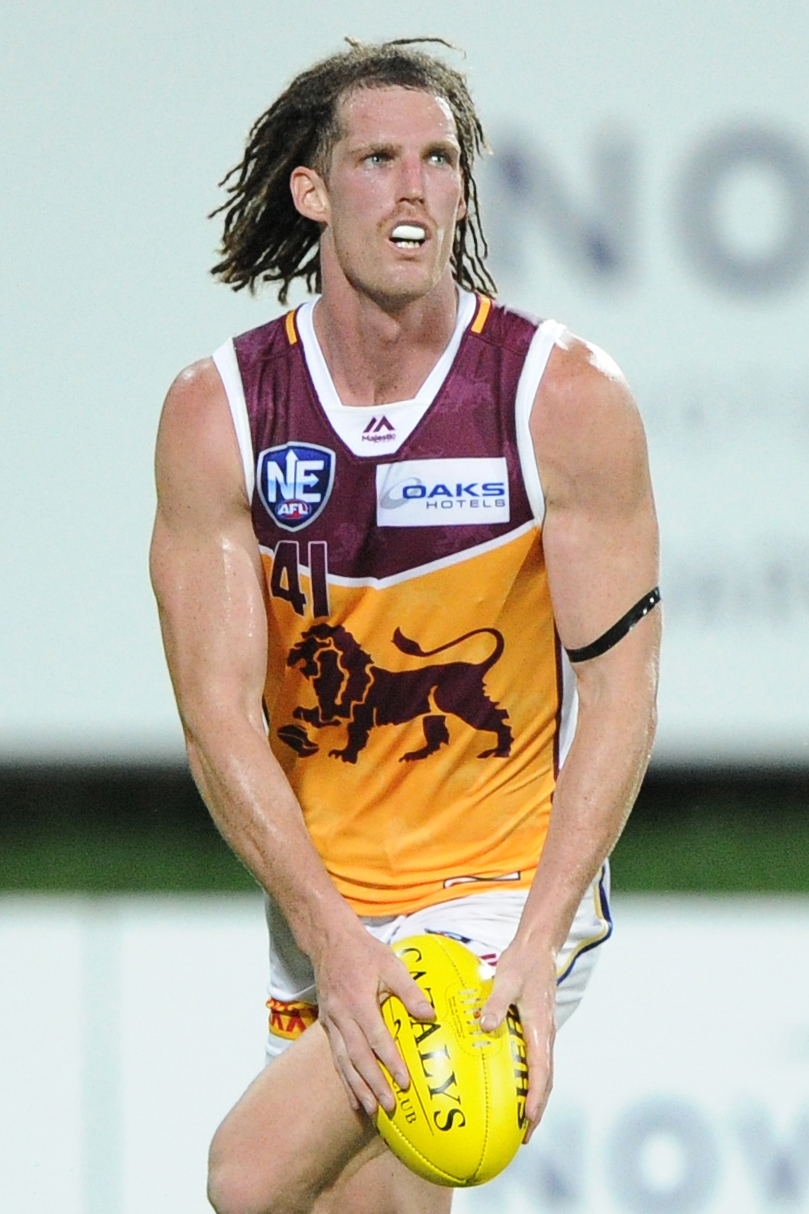
- Eagles in April 2018

Personal information
- Full name: Matthew Eagles
- Nicknames: Matt, Eagsy, Recruit
- Born: 9 February 1990 (age 36)
- Debut: Round 7, 2018, Brisbane Lions vs. Collingwood, at the Gabba
- Height: 200 cm (6 ft 7 in)
- Weight: 99 kg (218 lb)
- Position: Ruckman / defender

Playing career^{1}
Years	Club	Games (Goals)
2017–2020	Brisbane Lions	6 (1)
- ^{1} Playing statistics correct to the end of 2020.

Matthew Eagles (born 9 February 1990) is a former professional Australian rules footballer who last played for the Brisbane Lions in the Australian Football League (AFL).

Eagles is originally from South Australia and grew up supporting Port Adelaide. He eventually found his way to Queensland where he played for the Yeronga Football Club in the QAFL. Outside of playing football he owned a landscaping business. In 2016, Eagles appeared in season two of the reality TV series The Recruit, where he was the eventual winner. After appearing on The Recruit, he played with North Ballarat in the Victorian Football League (VFL).

In 2017 Eagles played for the Brisbane Lions in the North East Australian Football League as a ruckman, but towards the end of the season he was moved into defence and thrived. In the NEAFL Grand Final, he amassed 18 disposals, including a league high 17 intercept possessions.

Eagles made his senior AFL debut in round 7 of the 2018 season, against Collingwood. Being 28 at the time, he was the oldest league debutant in the club's history.

At the conclusion of the 2020 AFL season he was delisted by Brisbane.
