= Oscar McInerney =

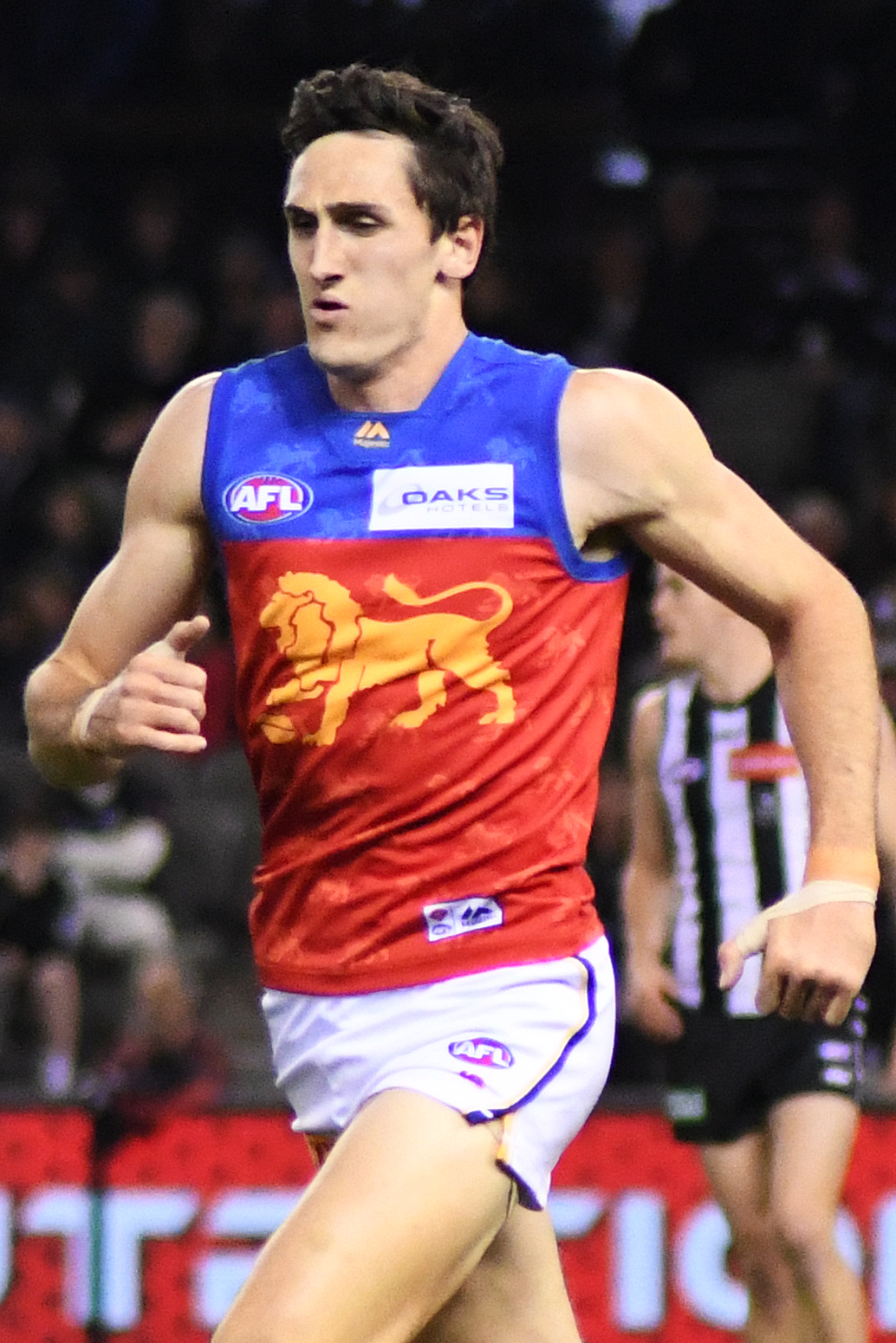
- McInerney in August 2018

Personal information
- Full name: Oscar McInerney
- Nickname: Big O
- Born: 10 July 1994 (age 32)
- Original team: Casey Scorpions (VFL)
- Draft: No. 37, 2017 rookie draft
- Debut: Round 6, 2018, Brisbane Lions vs. Greater Western Sydney, at Sydney Showground Stadium
- Height: 206 cm (6 ft 9 in)
- Weight: 108 kg (238 lb)
- Position: Ruck

Playing career
Years	Club	Games (Goals)
2017–2025	Brisbane Lions	165 (67)

Career highlights
- AFL premiership player: 2025; NEAFL premiership player: 2017

Oscar McInerney (born 10 July 1994) is a former professional Australian rules footballer who played for the Brisbane Lions in the Australian Football League (AFL). Brisbane drafted him with pick 37 in the 2017 rookie draft. He made his debut in the loss to Greater Western Sydney at Sydney Showground Stadium in round 6, 2018.

== Early life and junior football ==
Oscar attended Ringwood Secondary College in Melbourne's east, graduating in 2012. After leaving school, he played local football for Montrose in the Eastern Football League. McInerney was recruited to the VFL club Casey Scorpions for 2016, as a 204 cm ruckman, quickly making an impression with his ability to cover the ground, accurate tap work and clean hands below the knees. Winner of the A. Todd Medal for the best player in the VFL Development League, McInerney featured in the Scorpions’ VFL Finals campaign and attended the NAB AFL State Combine.

== AFL career ==
After being drafted to the Brisbane Lions, McInerney began playing in the NEAFL for the Brisbane Lions reserves. Making his debut in round 2 of the season, McInerney was impressive with 21 possessions and four inside 50s. In Round 10, McInerney managed 46 hitouts and four goals. Finishing second on the NEAFL ladder that year, McInerney was a crucial part of the Lions' finals campaign, being listed among the best players on the ground in their semi-final match-up against Sydney University. McInerney was part of the Lions' NEAFL premiership, as the Lions went on to defeat Sydney by three points.

McInerney was part of Brisbane's 2025 premiership side, after missing the 2024 Grand Final win due to injury. He announced his retirement eight days later.

== Statistics ==
Legend
G	Goals	K	Kicks	D	Disposals	T	Tackles
B	Behinds	H	Handballs	M	Marks	H/O	Hit-outs

Season	Team	No.	Games	Totals								Averages (per game)								Votes
Season	Team	No.	Games	G	B	K	H	D	M	T	H/O	G	B	K	H	D	M	T	H/O	Votes
2017	Brisbane Lions	46	0	—	—	—	—	—	—	—	—	—	—	—	—	—	—	—	—	0
2018	Brisbane Lions	46	16	14	8	77	57	134	45	37	176	0.9	0.5	4.8	3.6	8.4	2.8	2.3	11.0	0
2019	Brisbane Lions	46	21	10	7	76	97	173	55	56	336	0.5	0.3	3.6	4.6	8.2	2.6	2.7	16.0	0
2020 (Note: The 2020 season was played with 17 home-and-away matches per team (down from 22) and 16-minute quarters with time on (down from 20-minute quarters with time on) due to the impact of the COVID-19 pandemic.)	Brisbane Lions	46	19	6	4	91	75	166	33	57	366	0.3	0.2	4.8	3.9	8.7	1.7	3.0	19.3	0
2021	Brisbane Lions	46	23	6	5	156	145	301	53	51	672	0.3	0.2	6.8	6.3	13.1	2.3	2.2	29.2	1
2022	Brisbane Lions	46	22	9	7	132	128	260	45	64	576	0.4	0.3	6.0	5.8	11.8	2.0	2.9	26.2	0
2023	Brisbane Lions	46	25	9	7	173	137	310	44	72	845	0.4	0.3	6.9	5.5	12.4	1.8	2.9	33.8	0
2024	Brisbane Lions	46	25	9	4	176	143	319	48	79	809	0.4	0.2	7.0	5.7	12.8	1.9	3.2	32.4	2
2025^{#}	Brisbane Lions	46	14	4	5	76	56	132	22	39	347	0.3	0.4	5.4	4.0	9.4	1.6	2.8	24.8	1
Career			165	67	47	957	838	1795	345	455	4127	0.4	0.3	5.8	5.1	10.9	2.1	2.8	25.0	4
