= 2013 Carlton Football Club season =

Carlton Football Club
2013 season
- President: Stephen Kernahan
- Coach: Mick Malthouse
- Captain: Marc Murphy
- Home grounds: Etihad Stadium (Training and administrative: Visy Park)
- AFL season: 8th
- Finals series: 6th
- John Nicholls Medal: Kade Simpson
- Leading goalkicker: Jeff Garlett (43)
- Club membership: 50,564

The 2013 Carlton Football Club season was the Carlton Football Club's 150th season of competition, and 117th as a member of the Australian Football League. It was the first season coached by new coach Mick Malthouse, who replaced Brett Ratten after the club failed to reach the finals in 2012. Carlton finished sixth out of eighteen teams for the 2013 AFL season, after finishing eighth after the home-and-away season.

== Club summary ==
The 2013 AFL season was the 117th season of the VFL/AFL competition since its inception in 1897; and, having competed in every season, it was also the 117th season contested by the Carlton Football Club. As in previous years, the club's primary home ground was Etihad Stadium, with home games expecting to draw larger crowds played at the Melbourne Cricket Ground, and with traditional home ground Visy Park serving as the training and administrative base. The club's two joint major sponsors, car manufacturer Hyundai and confectionery company Mars, and the club extended its deal with Mars for a further three years. Carlton continued its alignment with the Northern Blues in the Victorian Football League, allowing Carlton-listed players to play with the Northern Blues when not selected in AFL matches.

The club adopted a new clash guernsey design for 2013, which was predominantly white with navy blue monogram, numbers, shoulders and waist; the new guernsey replaced the predominantly sky blue clash guernsey which had been in use for the previous two seasons.

The club used the membership campaign slogan "I am Carlton" for the second consecutive season, after having success with the personalisable slogan in the 2012 season. The club set a new membership record of 50,564, breaking by more than 10% the previous record of 45,800 set in 2012.

== Senior Personnel ==
There were several changes to Carlton's senior coaching panel after the 2012 season. Brett Ratten, who had coached the club since late 2007, was sacked with one year remaining on his contract after Carlton underperformed in the 2012 season, finishing tenth when a top four finish had been expected. Shortly after the season, Ratten was replaced in the role by experienced coach Mick Malthouse, who was signed to a three-year contract. Malthouse was at the time a three-time premiership coach at West Coast (in 1992 and 1994) and Collingwood (in 2010), with twenty-eight seasons and 662 games of VFL/AFL coaching experience with Footscray, West Coast and Collingwood; he had last coached in 2011, and had spent the 2012 season as part of the Seven Network's football commentary team.

Several of Ratten's assistants also departed after 2012, and Malthouse restructured the coaching panel. Senior assistant coach Alan Richardson and midfield assistant coaches Mark Riley and Paul Williams were all sacked with time remaining on their contracts, and development coach and Northern Blues senior coach Darren Harris left the club to pursue a career in leadership consulting. Western Australian state Under-16s coach Robert Wiley, who had previously worked as an assistant coach under Malthouse at West Coast, joined the club in the new role of Director of Coaching and Development, and recently retired Melbourne player Brad Green joined the club as a midfield development coach. Development coach Luke Webster took on the additional responsibility as Northern Blues coach for 2013.

Chris Judd opted to step down from the role of club captain, having served in the role for five seasons from 2008 until 2012; he was replaced in the role by Marc Murphy, with Kade Simpson and Andrew Carrazzo named as vice-captains. The leadership group was reduced from nine players to five, with Murphy, Carrazzo, Simpson and Jarrad Waite all holding their places from 2012 and Nick Duigan being elevated to the group for the first time.

Former club champion Stephen Kernahan continued as club president in the 2013 season, a position he had held since August 2008.

== Squad for 2013 ==
Statistics are correct as of end of 2012 season. Flags represent the state of origin, i.e. the state in which the player played his Under-18s football.

Senior List
| No. | State | Player | Age | AFL Debut | Recruited from | Career (to end 2012) | | 2013 Player Statistics |
| No. | State | Player | Age | AFL Debut | Recruited from | Gms | Gls | Gms | Gls | B | D | K | HB | M | T | HO |
| 1 | (Victoria (state)) | Andrew Walker | 26 | 2004 | Bendigo (U18) | 142 | 106 | 23 | 7 | 3 | 528 | 398 | 130 | 102 | 48 | – |
| 2 | (South Australia) | Troy Menzel | 18 | 2013 | Central District | – | – | 7 | 8 | 6 | 51 | 39 | 12 | 19 | 13 | – |
| 3 | (Victoria (state)) | Marc Murphy (c) | 25 | 2006 | Oakleigh (U18) | 142 | 115 | 23 | 18 | 7 | 512 | 284 | 228 | 87 | 79 | – |
| 4 | (South Australia) | Bryce Gibbs | 23 | 2007 | Glenelg | 134 | 69 | 21 | 15 | 13 | 469 | 302 | 167 | 92 | 75 | – |
| 5 | (Victoria (state)) | Chris Judd | 29 | 2002 | Sandringham (U18), West Coast | 239 | 206 | 20 | 11 | 12 | 453 | 236 | 217 | 48 | 68 | – |
| 6 | (Victoria (state)) | Kade Simpson (vc) | 28 | 2003 | Eastern (U18) | 176 | 111 | 24 | 6 | 9 | 533 | 350 | 183 | 140 | 51 | – |
| 7 | (Victoria (state)) | Dylan Buckley | 19 | 2013 | Northern (U18) | – | – | 1 | 1 | – | 5 | 2 | 3 | – | 1 | – |
| 8 | (Victoria (state)) | Matthew Kreuzer | 23 | 2008 | Northern (U18) | 88 | 48 | 17 | 8 | 11 | 195 | 116 | 79 | 56 | 71 | 428 |
| 9 | (Western Australia) | Kane Lucas | 21 | 2010 | East Fremantle | 18 | 5 | 17 | 9 | 11 | 308 | 164 | 144 | 75 | 36 | – |
| 10 | (Victoria (state)) | Matthew Watson | 20 | 2011 | Calder (U18) | 11 | 0 | 5 | 2 | 1 | 55 | 41 | 14 | 20 | 5 | – |
| 11 | (Victoria (state)) | Robert Warnock | 25 | 2007 | Sandringham (U18), Fremantle | 58 | 12 | 12 | 1 | 1 | 110 | 62 | 48 | 15 | 29 | 414 |
| 12 | (Tasmania) | Mitch Robinson | 23 | 2009 | Tasmania (U18/VFL) | 67 | 41 | 21 | 11 | 12 | 407 | 237 | 170 | 64 | 82 | 2 |
| 13 | (Western Australia) | Chris Yarran | 22 | 2009 | Swan Districts | 63 | 40 | 21 | 26 | 25 | 239 | 178 | 61 | 66 | 76 | 1 |
| 14 | (Victoria (state)) | Brock McLean | 26 | 2004 | Calder (U18), Melbourne | 119 | 52 | 22 | 15 | 13 | 464 | 254 | 210 | 105 | 77 | 2 |
| 15 | (Victoria (state)) | Jeremy Laidler | 23 | 2009 | Geelong (U18, AFL) | 25 | 2 | 1 | – | – | 4 | 3 | 1 | 1 | 5 | – |
| 17 | (Victoria (state)) | Sam Rowe | 25 | 2013 | Murray (U18), Sydney, Norwood | – | – | 10 | 9 | 7 | 93 | 59 | 34 | 41 | 19 | 73 |
| 18 | (Victoria (state)) | Tom Temay | 18 | – | Sandringham (U18) | – | – | – | – | – | – | – | – | – | – | – |
| 19 | (Victoria (state)) | Eddie Betts | 26 | 2005 | Calder (U18) | 166 | 263 | 18 | 27 | 15 | 210 | 125 | 85 | 49 | 61 | – |
| 21 | (Western Australia) | Josh Bootsma | 19 | 2012 | South Fremantle | 5 | – | 9 | 2 | – | 63 | 43 | 20 | 17 | 23 | – |
| 22 | (Queensland) | Shaun Hampson | 24 | 2007 | Mount Gravatt | 57 | 29 | 6 | 3 | 5 | 63 | 38 | 25 | 26 | 12 | 70 |
| 23 | (Victoria (state)) | Lachlan Henderson | 23 | 2007 | Geelong (U18), Brisbane | 60 | 34 | 24 | 26 | 14 | 329 | 242 | 87 | 153 | 41 | – |
| 24 | (South Australia) | Pat McCarthy | 20 | 2012 | Glenelg | 1 | 0 | – | – | – | – | – | – | – | – | – |
| 25 | (Victoria (state)) | Luke Mitchell | 20 | 2012 | Calder (U18) | 1 | 1 | – | – | – | – | – | – | – | – | – |
| 26 | (Victoria (state)) | Andrew McInnes | 20 | 2012 | Dandenong (U18) | 8 | – | 8 | 1 | – | 79 | 49 | 30 | 23 | 25 | – |
| 27 | (Western Australia) | Dennis Armfield | 26 | 2008 | Swan Districts | 81 | 25 | 24 | 17 | 9 | 340 | 196 | 144 | 55 | 46 | 1 |
| 29 | (Victoria (state)) | Heath Scotland | 32 | 1999 | Western (U18), Collingwood | 244 | 74 | 20 | 5 | 6 | 435 | 259 | 176 | 103 | 46 | – |
| 30 | (Victoria (state)) | Jarrad Waite (lg) | 29 | 2003 | Murray (U18) | 154 | 196 | 14 | 27 | 17 | 164 | 127 | 37 | 84 | 34 | – |
| 31 | (Tasmania) | Marcus Davies | 21 | 2010 | North Hobart | 15 | 1 | 2 | – | – | 14 | 8 | 6 | 2 | 9 | – |
| 32 | (Victoria (state)) | Nicholas Graham | 18 | 2013 | Gippsland (U18) | – | – | 2 | – | – | 23 | 18 | 5 | 6 | 2 | – |
| 34 | (South Australia) | Nick Duigan (lg) | 28 | 2011 | Norwood | 38 | 6 | 5 | 4 | 3 | 55 | 32 | 23 | 18 | 10 | – |
| 38 | (Western Australia) | Jeff Garlett | 23 | 2009 | Swan Districts | 76 | 128 | 22 | 43 | 29 | 268 | 189 | 79 | 66 | 76 | – |
| 40 | (Victoria (state)) | Michael Jamison | 26 | 2007 | North Ballarat (U18, VFL) | 87 | 1 | 24 | – | – | 259 | 155 | 104 | 102 | 45 | – |
| 41 | (Victoria (state)) | Levi Casboult | 22 | 2012 | Dandenong (U18) | 6 | 7 | 11 | 7 | 7 | 100 | 63 | 37 | 48 | 18 | 68 |
| 42 | (Republic of Ireland) | Zach Tuohy | 23 | 2011 | Laois GAA | 30 | 8 | 24 | 13 | 9 | 305 | 182 | 123 | 51 | 61 | – |
| 43 | (Western Australia) | Simon White | 24 | 2010 | Subiaco | 17 | 2 | 9 | – | – | 96 | 62 | 34 | 40 | 13 | – |
| 44 | (Victoria (state)) | Andrew Carrazzo (vc) | 29 | 2004 | Oakleigh (U18), Geelong | 154 | 46 | 10 | 1 | 1 | 180 | 84 | 96 | 25 | 30 | – |
| 45 | (Tasmania) | Aaron Joseph | 23 | 2009 | Tasmania (U18) | 69 | 10 | 4 | – | – | 28 | 15 | 13 | 4 | 12 | – |
| 46 | (Western Australia) | David Ellard | 23 | 2008 | Swan Districts | 37 | 22 | 3 | – | – | 30 | 19 | 11 | 4 | 17 | – |
Rookie List
| No. | State | Player | Age | AFL Debut | Recruited from | Career (to end 2012) | | 2013 Player Statistics |
| No. | State | Player | Age | AFL Debut | Recruited from | Gms | Gls | Gms | Gls | B | D | K | HB | M | T | HO |
| 16 | (Victoria (state)) | Andrew Collins | 24 | 2009 | Bendigo (U18), Richmond | 36 | 29 | – | – | – | – | – | – | – | – | – |
| 20 | (South Australia) | Rhys O'Keeffe | 22 | 2011 | North Adelaide | 3 | 0 | – | – | – | – | – | – | – | – | – |
| 28 | (Queensland) | Tom Bell | 21 | 2012 | Morningside | 7 | 4 | 9 | 4 | 4 | 135 | 76 | 59 | 17 | 31 | – |
| 35 | (Victoria (state)) | Ed Curnow | 23 | 2011 | Geelong (U18), Adelaide, Box Hill | 30 | 8 | 21 | 6 | 3 | 347 | 182 | 165 | 72 | 99 | – |
| 37 | (Victoria (state)) | Jaryd Cachia | 21 | 2013 | Northern (U18), Norwood | – | – | 14 | 1 | 4 | 202 | 117 | 85 | 49 | 68 | – |
| 39 | (Victoria (state)) | Frazer Dale | 19 | 2012 | Calder (U18) | 2 | 1 | – | – | – | – | – | – | – | – | – |
Senior coaching panel
| | State | Coach | Coaching position | | | | Carlton Coaching debut | | Former clubs as coach |
| | (Victoria (state)) | Mick Malthouse | Senior Coach | | | | 2013 | | Footscray (s), West Coast (s), Collingwood (s) |
| | (Western Australia) | Robert Wiley | Director of Coaching and Development | | | | 2013 | | Perth (s), West Coast (a), Western Australia U16s (s) |
| | (Victoria (state)) | John Barker | Assistant coach (Forward) | | | | 2011 | | St Kilda (a), Hawthorn (a) |
| | (Victoria (state)) | Gavin Brown | Assistant coach (Defense) | | | | 2011 | | Collingwood (a), Collingwood (VFL) (s) |
| | (Victoria (state)) | Matthew Capuano | Assistant coach (Ruck) and Development Coach | | | | 2009 |
| | (Victoria (state)) | Luke Webster | Development coach, Northern Blues senior coach | | | | 2011 |
| | (Tasmania) | Brad Green | Development coach (Midfield) | | | | 2013 |

- For players: (c) denotes captain, (vc) denotes vice-captain, (lg) denotes leadership group.
- For coaches: (s) denotes senior coach, (cs) denotes caretaker senior coach, (a) denotes assistant coach, (d) denotes development coach.

== Playing list changes ==
The following summarises all player changes between the conclusion of the 2012 season and the conclusion of the 2013 season.

The 2012/13 offseason was the first in league history to allow players to switch clubs as free agents. Two players who qualified for unrestricted free agency – Jordan Russell and Bret Thornton – announced their intentions to seek other clubs following the 2012 season. Russell moved to Collingwood in the club's only transaction during the initial free agency and trade period; Thornton was delisted, and ultimately recruited by Greater Western Sydney in the preseason draft.

=== In ===
| Player | Previous club | League | via |
|---|---|---|---|
| (South Australia) Troy Menzel | Central District | SANFL | AFL National Draft, first round (pick No. 11) |
| (Victoria (state)) Tom Temay | Sandringham Dragons | TAC Cup | AFL National Draft, second round (pick No. 35) |
| (Victoria (state)) Nicholas Graham | Gippsland Power | TAC Cup | AFL National Draft, third round (pick No. 54) |
| (Victoria (state)) Jaryd Cachia | Norwood | SANFL | AFL Rookie Draft, first round (pick No. 9) |

=== Out ===
| Player | New Club | League | via |
|---|---|---|---|
| (Victoria (state)) Rohan Kerr | West Perth | WAFL | Delisted |
| (Victoria (state)) Nicholas Heyne | Ainslie | NEAFL | Delisted from the rookie list |
| (Western Australia) Mitchell Carter | South Fremantle | WAFL | Delisted from the rookie list |
| (New South Wales) Blake Bray | Campbelltown | Sydney AFL | Delisted from the rookie list |
| (New South Wales) Matthew Lodge | None | None | Delisted from the rookie list; stayed at the club as a journalist for the club's website. |
| (Western Australia) Paul Bower | Peel Thunder | WAFL | Delisted |
| (South Australia) Jordan Russell | Collingwood | AFL | AFL Trade Period, in exchange for a fourth round draft pick (No. 71 overall) |
| (Victoria (state)) Bret Thornton | GWS | AFL | Delisted |

=== List management ===
| Player | Change |
|---|---|
| (Victoria (state)) Levi Casboult | Promoted from the rookie list to the senior list during AFL National Draft, fifth round (pick No. 89) |
| (Republic of Ireland) Zach Tuohy | Promoted from the rookie list to the senior list during AFL National Draft, sixth round (pick No. 102) |
| (Victoria (state)) Andrew Collins | Delisted, received permission to continue training with Carlton in the lead-up to the draft, and then redrafted in the AFL Rookie Draft, second round (pick No. 24) |
| (Western Australia) Kyle Reimers | Received permission to train with Carlton in the lead-up to the pre-season draft, but ultimately opted not to accept the invitation |
| (Victoria (state)) Andrew McInnes (Queensland) Tom Bell | Prior to the NAB Cup, McInnes was moved to the long-term injury list (knee injury sustained in late 2012), and Bell was elevated to the senior list in his place. |
| (Victoria (state)) Nicholas Graham (Victoria (state)) Jaryd Cachia | Prior to Round 6, Graham was moved to the long-term injury list (knee), and Cachia was elevated to the senior list in his place. |
| (South Australia) Pat McCarthy (Victoria (state)) Nicholas Graham | Prior to Round 12, McCarthy was moved to the long-term injury list (foot), and Graham returned to the senior list from the long-term injury list in his place. |

== Season summary ==
During November 2012, the playing list attended a high-altitude training camp in Arizona. New coach Mick Malthouse had taken his team to several such training camps in Arizona while coaching at Collingwood.

=== Pre-season matches ===
2013 NAB Cup

Carlton won three of its four preliminary matches; due to its strong percentage, the club finished second on the NAB Cup ladder to qualify for the Grand Final, to play against Brisbane Lions, the only undefeated team in the preliminary rounds. Brisbane then defeated Carlton in the Grand Final by 40 points.

| **Rd** | **Date and local time** | **Opponent** | **Scores** (Carlton's scores indicated in **bold**) | | | **Venue** | **Attendance** | **Ladder** **position** |
| **Rd** | **Date and local time** | **Opponent** | Home | Away | Result | **Venue** | **Attendance** | **Ladder** **position** |
**Lightning matches**
| 1 | Sunday, 24 February (4:40 pm) | GWS | 0.5.2 (32) | **0.4.10 (34)** | Won by 2 points | Blacktown (A) | 4,078 | 2nd |
| 1 | Sunday, 24 February (5:50 pm) | Sydney | 0.3.6 (24) | **1.5.7 (46)** | Won by 22 points | Blacktown (A) | 4,078 | 2nd |
**Full matches**
| 2 | Saturday, 2 March (7:40 pm) | Fremantle | **0.18.16 (124)** | 1.6.9 (54) | Won by 70 points | Etihad Stadium (H) | 9,402 | 1st |
| 3 | Friday, 8 March (8:10 pm) | Adelaide | 4.11.7 (109) | **2.13.10 (106)** | Lost by 3 points | AAMI Stadium (A) | 7,511 | 2nd |
**Grand Final**
| GF | Friday, 15 March (7:40 pm) | Brisbane Lions | 0.16.13 (109) | **2.7.9 (69)** | Lost by 40 points | Etihad Stadium (A) | 24,844 | 2nd |

=== Home and away season ===
Carlton finished the season with a win–loss record of 11–11, the ninth-best record in the league. In summary:

- Against the top six plus Essendon (clubs which finished with 14 or more wins), Carlton had a record of 1–9 from ten games, the sole win coming against Richmond in Round 20. Six of the nine losses were by three goals or less.
- Against clubs between 7th and 13th, excluding Essendon (clubs which finished with between 9 and 12 wins), Carlton had a perfect record of 6–0.
- Against the bottom five (clubs which finished with 8 wins or fewer), Carlton had a record of 4–2, suffering upset losses against St Kilda in Round 7 and Western Bulldogs in Round 20.

End of the season and the effect of Essendon supplements controversy

Coming into the last two rounds of the season, Carlton needed to win both of its games to qualify for the finals; so, when Essendon won in Round 22 by six points, Carlton was eliminated from finals contention. However, during the season, Essendon was investigated over irregularities in its supplements and sports science program, and three days after the Round 22 match, the AFL excluded Essendon from the 2013 finals series (relegating it to ninth) as part of the penalties handed down over the scandal, promoting Carlton to eighth place. Carlton then needed to win or draw, or lose and see other results fall favourably, in the final round to hold onto eighth place – and succeeded, overcoming a 39-point third quarter deficit to record a one-point victory against Port Adelaide.

| **Rd** | **Date and local time** | **Opponent** | **Scores** (Carlton's scores indicated in **bold**) | | | **Venue** | **Attendance** | **Ladder** **position** |
| **Rd** | **Date and local time** | **Opponent** | Home | Away | Result | **Venue** | **Attendance** | **Ladder** **position** |
| 1 | Thursday, 28 March (7:40 pm) | Richmond | **14.17 (101)** | 14.22 (106) | Lost by 5 points | M.C.G. (H) | 80,971 | 10th |
| 2 | Sunday, 7 April (3:15 pm) | Collingwood | 17.15 (117) | **15.10 (100)** | Lost by 17 points | M.C.G. (A) | 84,247 | 13th |
| 3 | Saturday, 13 April (7:40 pm) | Geelong | 18.11 (119) | **15.13 (103)** | Lost by 16 points | Etihad Stadium (A) | 43,241 | 15th |
| 4 | Saturday, 20 April (5:40 pm) | West Coast | 7.23 (65) | **12.17 (89)** | Won by 24 points | Patersons Stadium (A) | 38,674 | 13th |
| 5 | Saturday, 27 April (4:40 pm) | Adelaide | **17.13 (115)** | 12.11 (83) | Won by 32 points | M.C.G. (H) | 44,711 | 9th |
| 6 | Sunday, 5 May (3:15 pm) | Melbourne | **18.13 (121)** | 8.12 (60) | Won by 61 points | M.C.G. (H) | 35,286 | 8th |
| 7 | Monday, 13 May (7:40 pm) | St Kilda | 11.11 (77) | **9.14 (68)** | Lost by 9 points | Etihad Stadium (A) | 34,054 | 11th |
| 8 | Sunday, 19 May (1:10 pm) | Port Adelaide | **16.13 (109)** | 14.7 (91) | Won by 18 points | Etihad Stadium (H) | 29,936 | 10th |
| 9 | Saturday, 25 May (7:40 pm) | Brisbane Lions | 12.13 (85) | **13.20 (98)** | Won by 13 points | Gabba (A) | 24,037 | 8th |
| 10 | Saturday, 1 June (1:45 pm) | GWS | **22.16 (148)** | 8.6 (54) | Won by 94 points | Etihad Stadium (H) | 25,008 | 6th |
| 11 | Friday, 7 June (7:50 pm) | Essendon | 11.11 (77) | **10.12 (72)** | Lost by 5 points | M.C.G. (A) | 82,639 | 7th |
| 12 | Friday, 14 June (7:50 pm) | Hawthorn | **13.9 (87)** | 15.12 (102) | Lost by 15 points | Etihad Stadium (H) | 45,670 | 8th |
| 13 | Bye | | | | | | | 9th |
| 14 | Friday, 28 June (7:50 pm) | Sydney | 8.17 (65) | **5.13 (43)** | Lost by 22 points | S.C.G. (A) | 25,349 | 9th |
| 15 | Friday, 5 July (7:50 pm) | Collingwood | **12.5 (77)** | 17.16 (118) | Lost by 41 points | M.C.G. (H) | 78,224 | 11th |
| 16 | Saturday, 13 July (7:40 pm) | St Kilda | **16.14 (110)** | 10.14 (74) | Won by 36 points | Etihad Stadium (H) | 30,949 | 9th |
| 17 | Friday, 19 July (7:50 pm) | North Melbourne | 16.12 (108) | **16.13 (109)** | Won by 1 point | Etihad Stadium (A) | 37,443 | 9th |
| 18 | Saturday, 27 July (1:45 pm) | Gold Coast | 11.11 (77) | **16.24 (120)** | Won by 43 points | Metricon Stadium (A) | 19,460 | 9th |
| 19 | Saturday, 3 August (7:40 pm) | Fremantle | **12.8 (80)** | 17.14 (116) | Lost by 36 points | Etihad Stadium (H) | 30,457 | 9th |
| 20 | Saturday, 10 August (4:40 pm) | Western Bulldogs | **13.11 (89)** | 16.21 (117) | Lost by 28 points | Etihad Stadium (H) | 31,126 | 9th |
| 21 | Saturday, 17 August (1:45 pm) | Richmond | 14.12 (96) | **16.10 (106)** | Won by 10 points | M.C.G. (A) | 63,825 | 9th |
| 22 | Saturday, 24 August (7:40 pm) | Essendon | **9.22 (76)** | 12.10 (82) | Lost by 6 points | M.C.G. (H) | 53,630 | 9th |
| 23 | Saturday, 31 August (4:10 pm) | Port Adelaide | 15.13 (103) | **15.14 (104)** | Won by 1 point | AAMI Stadium (A) | 45,127 | 8th |

=== Finals ===
In the elimination final, Carlton faced Richmond, which was in its first finals match since 2001. Carlton trailed by 32 points early in the third quarter, before an eight-minute purple patch in which it kicked five consecutive goals to bring the margin back to one point; Carlton went on to kick six goals to two in the final quarter to win by 20 points. Sydney was a comfortable winner in the semi-final, leading by 54 points at three-quarter time before finishing with a 24-point win.

| **Week** | **Date and local time** | **Opponent** | **Scores** (Carlton's scores indicated in **bold**) | | | **Venue** | **Attendance** |
| **Week** | **Date and local time** | **Opponent** | Home | Away | Result | **Venue** | **Attendance** |
| First Elimination Final | Sunday, 8 September (3:20 pm) | Richmond | 14.12 (96) | **18.8 (116)** | Won by 20 points | M.C.G. (A) | 94,690 |
| First Semi-Final | Saturday, 14 September (7:40 pm) | Sydney | 13.8 (86) | **8.14 (62)** | Lost by 24 points | ANZ Stadium (A) | 37,980 |

== Ladder ==
2013 AFL ladder
| Pos | Team | Pld | W | L | D | PF | PA | PP | Pts | |
|---|---|---|---|---|---|---|---|---|---|---|
| 1 | Hawthorn (P) | 22 | 19 | 3 | 0 | 2523 | 1859 | 135.7 | 76 | Finals series |
| 2 | Geelong | 22 | 18 | 4 | 0 | 2409 | 1776 | 135.6 | 72 | Finals series |
| 3 | Fremantle | 22 | 16 | 5 | 1 | 2035 | 1518 | 134.1 | 66 | Finals series |
| 4 | Sydney | 22 | 15 | 6 | 1 | 2244 | 1694 | 132.5 | 62 | Finals series |
| 5 | Richmond | 22 | 15 | 7 | 0 | 2154 | 1754 | 122.8 | 60 | Finals series |
| 6 | Collingwood | 22 | 14 | 8 | 0 | 2148 | 1868 | 115.0 | 56 | Finals series |
| 7 | Port Adelaide | 22 | 12 | 10 | 0 | 2051 | 2002 | 102.4 | 48 | Finals series |
| 8 | Carlton | 22 | 11 | 11 | 0 | 2125 | 1992 | 106.7 | 44 | Finals series |
| 9 | Essendon | 22 | 14 | 8 | 0 | 2145 | 2000 | 107.3 | 56 (Note: Essendon was relegated to ninth due to irregularities in its supplements program during the 2012 season.) | |
| 10 | North Melbourne | 22 | 10 | 12 | 0 | 2307 | 1930 | 119.5 | 40 | |
| 11 | Adelaide | 22 | 10 | 12 | 0 | 2064 | 1909 | 108.1 | 40 | |
| 12 | Brisbane Lions | 22 | 10 | 12 | 0 | 1922 | 2144 | 89.6 | 40 | |
| 13 | West Coast | 22 | 9 | 13 | 0 | 2038 | 2139 | 95.3 | 36 | |
| 14 | Gold Coast | 22 | 8 | 14 | 0 | 1918 | 2091 | 91.7 | 32 | |
| 15 | Western Bulldogs | 22 | 8 | 14 | 0 | 1926 | 2262 | 85.1 | 32 | |
| 16 | St Kilda | 22 | 5 | 17 | 0 | 1751 | 2120 | 82.6 | 20 | |
| 17 | Melbourne | 22 | 2 | 20 | 0 | 1455 | 2691 | 54.1 | 8 | |
| 18 | Greater Western Sydney | 22 | 1 | 21 | 0 | 1524 | 2990 | 51.0 | 4 | |

Source: AFL Tables
Rules for classification: 1) points; 2) percentage; 3) number of points for.
(P) Premiers

== Leading Goalkickers ==
Jeff Garlett was Carlton's leading goalkicker for the season, with 43 goals. It was the first time Garlett had won Carlton's goalkicking.

| Player | Goals | Behinds |
|---|---|---|
| Jeff Garlett | 43 | 29 |
| Jarrad Waite | 27 | 17 |
| Eddie Betts | 27 | 15 |
| Chris Yarran | 26 | 25 |
| Lachlan Henderson | 26 | 14 |
| Marc Murphy | 18 | 7 |
| Dennis Armfield | 17 | 9 |
| Brock McLean | 15 | 13 |
| Zach Tuohy | 13 | 9 |
| Chris Judd; Mitch Robinson | 11 | 12 |

== Team awards and records ==
Game records

- Round 1 – Carlton's was defeated by Richmond for the first time since 2008, ending a nine-match winning streak against the Tigers.
- First Elimination Final – the crowd of 94,690 set a new record as the highest ever to a match in the first week of the finals since prior to 1972, when the introduction of the final five meant that more than one match was played on that weekend. This record stood until 2017.

Other

- Round 7 – St Kilda hosted Carlton in a match which commemorated the 140th anniversary of St Kilda's first ever match, which took place on 31 May 1873 against the Carlton second twenty.
- Round 11 – Essendon hosted Carlton in a match which commemorated the 140th anniversary of Essendon's first ever match, which took place on 7 June 1873 against the Carlton second twenty.
- Round 23 – Port Adelaide hosted Carlton in the last AFL match ever held at AAMI Stadium. In the match, Carlton trailed by 39 points midway through the third quarter, before staging a comeback to win by one point. The win clinched eighth place and a finals berth.

== Individual awards and records ==
=== John Nicholls Medal ===
The Carlton Football Club Best and Fairest awards night took place on 1 October. The John Nicholls Medal, for the best and fairest player of the club, as well as several other awards, were presented on the night.

John Nicholls Medal

The winner of the John Nicholls Medal was Kade Simpson, who polled 92 votes. It was Simpson's first John Nicholls Medal. Simpson won ahead of Andrew Walker and Lachlan Henderson. The top ten is given below.

| Pos. | Player | Votes |
|---|---|---|
| 1st | Kade Simpson | 92 |
| 2nd | Andrew Walker | 77 |
| 3rd | Lachlan Henderson | 71 |
| 4th | Ed Curnow | 67 |
| 5th | Bryce Gibbs | 55 |
| 6th | Michael Jamison | 54 |
| 7th | Zach Tuohy | 53 |
| 8th | Chris Judd | 52 |
| 8th | Brock McLean | 52 |
| 10th | Jeff Garlett | 51 |

Other awards

The following other awards were presented on John Nicholls Medal night:-

- Best First-Year Player – Jaryd Cachia
- Best Clubman – Ed Curnow
- Women of Carlton Player Ambassador – Nick Duigan
- The Carltonians High Achiever Award – Lachlan Henderson
- Blues Coterie "Most Determined" Award – Lachlan Henderson
- Inner Blue Ruthness Award – Kade Simpson

=== AFLPA Awards ===
For each of the AFLPA awards, one or three Carlton players were nominated following internal vote of Carlton players; Marc Murphy was also nominated for the Best Captain award by default. Kade Simpson finished fifth for the Robert Rose Awards; no other Carlton player finished in his respective top five.

Leigh Matthews Trophy (Most Valuable Player)

- Lachlan Henderson (nominated)
- Chris Judd (nominated)
- Kade Simpson (nominated)

Robert Rose Award (Most Courageous Player)

- Kade Simpson (fifth place)

Best First Year Player

- Troy Menzel (nominated)

=== Other awards ===
Representative honours

- Eddie Betts represented the Indigenous All-Stars team in its pre-season match against Richmond.
- In the 2013 International Rules Series, a two-test series held in Cavan and Dublin, Ireland, in October, Chris Yarran and Eddie Betts represented the Indigenous All-Stars team and Zach Tuohy represented Ireland.

Carlton Football Club Hall of Fame

- Geoff Southby, who played 268 games for and won two premierships with Carlton between 1971 and 1984, became the twelfth player elevated to Legend status in the Carlton Football Club Hall of Fame.
- David Rhys-Jones, who played 108 games for and won one premiership and a Norm Smith Medal with Carlton between 1985 and 1992, was inducted into the Carlton Football Club Hall of Fame.

=== Player records ===
- Round 3 – Dylan Buckley, on his AFL debut, kicked a goal with his first kick.
- Round 11 – Jarrad Waite kicked a career-high 7.1 (43) against Essendon.
- First Elimination Final - Ed Curnow became the first Carlton footballer to play all 50 senior games as a rookie.

== Northern Bullants ==
The Carlton Football Club had a full affiliation with the Northern Blues during the 2011 season. It was the eleventh season of the clubs' affiliation, which had been in place since 2003. Carlton senior- and rookie-listed players who were not selected to play in the Carlton team were eligible to play for either the Northern Bullants seniors or reserves team in the Victorian Football League. As in 2012, home games were shared between the VFL club's traditional home ground, Preston City Oval, and Carlton's traditional home ground, Visy Park. The Northern Blues finished 9th out of 14 in the VFL, missing the final eight by four premiership points and percentage; there had been speculation that the Northern Blues could have been promoted to the eighth if the AFL and AFL Victoria had decided to exclude the eighth-placed Essendon reserves team from the VFL finals as part of the punishments for the club's supplements scandal, but the league did not apply this punishment.
