= 2014 Carlton Football Club season =

Carlton Football Club
2014 season
- 150th anniversary logo
- President: Stephen Kernahan; Mark LoGiudice
- Coach: Mick Malthouse
- Captain: Marc Murphy
- Home grounds: Etihad Stadium (Training and administrative: Visy Park)
- AFL season: 13th (7–14–1)
- Leading goalkicker: Jarrad Waite (29)
- Club membership: 47,485

The 2014 Carlton Football Club season was the Carlton Football Club's 151st season of competition, and 118th as a member of the Australian Football League, and served as a celebration of the sesquicentenary of the club's foundation in 1864. The club finished thirteenth out of eighteen clubs in the 2014 AFL season.

== Club summary ==
The 2014 AFL season was the 118th season of the VFL/AFL competition since its inception in 1897; and, having competed in every season, it was also the 118th season contested by the Carlton Football Club. As in previous years, the club's primary home ground was Etihad Stadium, with home games expecting to draw larger crowds played at the Melbourne Cricket Ground, and with traditional home ground Visy Park serving as the training and administrative base. The club's two joint major sponsors, car manufacturer Hyundai and confectionery company Mars, were unchanged; and, the club extended its deal with Hyundai until 2017. As has been since 1998, Nike will produce and manufacture the club's on-and-off field apparel. Carlton continued its alignment with the Northern Blues in the Victorian Football League, allowing Carlton-listed players to play with the Northern Blues when not selected in AFL matches. The club's membership for the 2014 season was 47,485, a 6.1% reduction from the record membership of 50,561 enjoyed in 2013, making Carlton one of only four clubs to suffer a drop in membership in the 2014 season; the club also posted as $1,600,000 operating loss. Both of these were in part blamed on the club's experimental fixture, which including four games in the non-traditional Sunday night timeslot, and the negative effect of the club's 0–4 start to the season.

== Senior personnel ==
Former club champion Stephen Kernahan, who had been club president since August 2008, continued in the role into the start of the 2014 season; but he announced in October 2013 that it would be his last season as president. In April 2014, club vice-president and businessman Mark LoGiudice was announced as Kernahan's successor, and he formally took over the role from 23 June. Club CEO Greg Swann, who had been in the role since March 2007, stepped down at the same time as Kernahan; he was replaced in August by Steven Trigg, who left the Adelaide Crows after having served as CEO there for the previous twelve years.

Mick Malthouse continued in his second season as senior coach; former North Melbourne senior coach Dean Laidley joined his coaching panel as a midfield assistant coach, recently retired Hawthorn player Michael Osborne joined the club as a development coach, and defense assistant coach Gavin Brown left the club to take an assistant coaching role at North Melbourne.

Marc Murphy continued as club captain for his second season in the role, and Andrew Carrazzo and Kade Simpson continued as vice-captains. The other members of the eight-man leadership group, all of whom were not in the group in 2013, were: Michael Jamison (who became deputy vice-captain), Lachlan Henderson, Andrew Walker, Bryce Gibbs and Brock McLean.

== Squad for 2014 ==
Statistics are correct as of end of 2013 season. Flags represent the state of origin, i.e. the state in which the player played his Under-18s football.

Senior List
No.	State	Player	Age	AFL Debut	Recruited from	Career (to end 2013)		2014 Player Statistics
No.	State	Player	Age	AFL Debut	Recruited from	Gms	Gls	Gms	Gls	B	D	K	HB	M	T	HO
1	(Victoria (state))	Andrew Walker (lg)	27	2004	Bendigo (U18)	165	116	14	2	2	315	223	92	71	28	–
2	(South Australia)	Troy Menzel	20	2013	Central District	7	8	19	26	13	175	130	45	66	28	–
3	(Victoria (state))	Marc Murphy (c)	26	2006	Oakleigh (U18)	165	133	20	10	9	482	275	207	75	99	–
4	(South Australia)	Bryce Gibbs (lg)	24	2007	Glenelg	155	80	22	18	15	545	308	237	89	108	22
5	(Victoria (state))	Chris Judd	30	2002	Sandringham (U18), West Coast	259	217	12	7	4	246	141	105	44	41	–
6	(Victoria (state))	Kade Simpson (vc)	29	2003	Eastern (U18)	200	117	22	4	6	520	349	171	139	52	1
7	(Victoria (state))	Dylan Buckley	20	2013	Northern (U18)	1	1	8	1	1	107	59	48	29	22	–
8	(Victoria (state))	Matthew Kreuzer	24	2008	Northern (U18)	105	56	1	–	–	14	9	5	3	–	13
9	(Western Australia)	Kane Lucas	22	2010	East Fremantle	35	14	7	1	1	85	44	41	24	17	–
10	(Victoria (state))	Matthew Watson	21	2011	Calder (U18)	16	2	3	4	1	41	25	16	10	4	1
11	(Victoria (state))	Robert Warnock	26	2007	Sandringham (U18), Fremantle	70	13	16	4	–	139	79	60	14	30	548
12	(Tasmania)	Mitch Robinson	24	2009	Tasmania (U18/VFL)	88	52	12	6	5	239	124	115	56	49	6
13	(Western Australia)	Chris Yarran	23	2009	Swan Districts	84	66	21	21	9	343	250	93	89	47	–
14	(Victoria (state))	Brock McLean (lg)	27	2004	Calder (U18), Melbourne	141	67	16	9	13	307	182	125	66	49	1
15	(Victoria (state))	Sam Docherty	20	2013	Gippsland (U18), Brisbane Lions	13	1	16	7	8	297	207	90	82	43	–
16	(Western Australia)	Patrick Cripps	18	2014	East Fremantle	–	–	3	–	1	27	10	17	5	9	–
17	(Victoria (state))	Sam Rowe	26	2013	Murray (U18), Sydney, Norwood	10	9	21	2	1	243	135	108	108	42	23
18	(Victoria (state))	Tom Temay	19	–	Sandringham (U18)	–	–	–	–	–	–	–	–	–	–	–
19	(South Australia)	Cameron Giles	18	–	Woodville-West Torrens	–	–	–	–	–	–	–	–	–	–	–
20	(Victoria (state))	Nick Holman	18	2014	Murray (U18)	–	–	1	–	–	8	5	3	2	4	–
21	(Western Australia)	Josh Bootsma	20	2012	South Fremantle	14	2	–	–	–	–	–	–	–	–	–
23	(Victoria (state))	Lachlan Henderson (lg)	24	2007	Geelong (U18), Brisbane	84	60	17	28	14	192	137	55	88	33	–
26	(Victoria (state))	Andrew McInnes	21	2012	Dandenong (U18)	16	1	1	–	–	11	7	4	1	2	–
27	(Western Australia)	Dennis Armfield	27	2008	Swan Districts	105	42	8	2	1	59	31	28	9	20	–
28	(Queensland)	Tom Bell	22	2012	Morningside	16	8	13	11	3	186	121	65	48	46	1
30	(Victoria (state))	Jarrad Waite	30	2003	Murray (U18)	168	223	16	29	17	231	169	62	101	46	–
32	(Victoria (state))	Nicholas Graham	19	2013	Gippsland (U18)	2	–	8	2	2	86	62	24	29	20	–
33	(Victoria (state))	Andrejs Everitt	24	2007	Dandenong (U18), Western Bulldogs, Sydney	79	32	17	13	7	286	160	126	89	38	5
34	(South Australia)	Nick Duigan	29	2011	Norwood	43	10	–	–	–	–	–	–	–	–	–
35	(Victoria (state))	Ed Curnow	24	2011	Geelong (U18), Adelaide, Box Hill	51	9	15	2	3	319	163	156	60	74	–
38	(Western Australia)	Jeff Garlett	24	2009	Swan Districts	98	171	–	–	–	–	–	–	–	–	–
39	(Victoria (state))	Dale Thomas	26	2006	Gippsland (U18), Collingwood	157	121	20	12	8	346	224	122	113	57	–
40	(Victoria (state))	Michael Jamison (dvc)	27	2007	North Ballarat (U18, VFL)	111	1	20	1	3	226	147	79	108	28	–
41	(Victoria (state))	Levi Casboult	23	2012	Dandenong (U18)	17	14	19	15	11	200	109	91	108	43	131
42	(Republic of Ireland)	Zach Tuohy	24	2011	Laois GAA	54	21	22	4	6	308	195	113	64	31	–
43	(Western Australia)	Simon White	25	2010	Subiaco	26	2	19	7	2	198	129	69	80	35	4
44	(Victoria (state))	Andrew Carrazzo (vc)	30	2004	Oakleigh (U18), Geelong	164	47	14	–	1	281	119	162	40	86	–
46	(Western Australia)	David Ellard	24	2008	Swan Districts	40	22	13	11	9	142	84	58	34	62	–
Rookie List
No.	State	Player	Age	AFL Debut	Recruited from	Career (to end 2013)		2014 Player Statistics
No.	State	Player	Age	AFL Debut	Recruited from	Gms	Gls	Gms	Gls	B	D	K	HB	M	T	HO
29	(Victoria (state))	Heath Scotland	33	1999	Western (U18), Collingwood	264	79	4	2	1	75	46	29	17	12	–
31	(South Australia)	Luke Reynolds	18	–	Port Adelaide (SANFL)	–	–	–	–	–	–	–	–	–	–	–
36	(South Australia)	Cameron Wood	26	2005	West Adelaide, Brisbane Lions, Collingwood, Williamstown	64	21	6	2	2	67	44	23	26	12	143
37	(Victoria (state))	Jaryd Cachia	22	2013	Northern (U18), Norwood	14	1	–	–	–	–	–	–	–	–	–
45	(Western Australia)	Blaine Johnson	18	2014	South Fremantle	–	–	5	1	1	42	27	15	14	7	–
47	(Republic of Ireland)	Ciarán Sheehan	23	2014	Cork GAA	–	–	4	–	1	50	33	17	9	6	–
48	(Republic of Ireland)	Ciarán Byrne	18	–	Louth GAA	–	–	–	–	–	–	–	–	–	–	–
Senior coaching panel
	State	Coach	Coaching position				Carlton Coaching debut		Former clubs as coach
	(Victoria (state))	Mick Malthouse	Senior Coach				2013		Footscray (s), West Coast (s), Collingwood (s)
	(Western Australia)	Robert Wiley	Director of Coaching and Development				2013		Perth (s), West Coast (a), Western Australia U16s (s)
	(Victoria (state))	John Barker	Assistant coach (Back-line)				2011		St Kilda (a), Hawthorn (a)
	(Western Australia)	Dean Laidley	Assistant coach (Midfield)				2014		Collingwood (a), North Melbourne (s), Port Adelaide (a), St Kilda (a)
	(Tasmania)	Brad Green	Assistant coach (Forward-line)				2013
	(Victoria (state))	Matthew Capuano	Development coach				2009
	(Queensland)	Michael Osborne	Development coach				2013
	(Victoria (state))	Luke Webster	Development coach, Northern Blues senior coach				2011

- For players: (c) denotes captain, (vc) denotes vice-captain, (dvc) denotes deputy vice-captain, (lg) denotes leadership group.
- For coaches: (s) denotes senior coach, (cs) denotes caretaker senior coach, (a) denotes assistant coach, (d) denotes development coach.

== Playing list changes ==
The following summarises all player changes between the conclusion of the 2013 season and the conclusion of the 2014 season.

=== In ===
Player	Previous club	League	via
(Republic of Ireland) Ciarán Byrne	Louth GAA	GAA	Signed as a Category B international rookie in August 2013; as a formality, he was selected in the AFL Rookie Draft, sixth round (No. 64 overall)
(Victoria (state)) Dale Thomas	Collingwood	AFL	Signed as a restricted free agent
(Victoria (state)) Sam Docherty	Brisbane Lions	AFL	AFL Trade Period, in exchange for a second-round draft pick (No. 33 overall)
(Victoria (state)) Andrejs Everitt	Sydney	AFL	AFL Trade Period, with a third-round draft pick (No. 39 overall), in exchange for a second-round draft pick (No. 32 overall)
(Republic of Ireland) Ciarán Sheehan	Cork GAA	GAA	Signed a contract as a rookie in early November 2013; as a formality, he was selected in the AFL Rookie Draft, fifth round (No. 60 overall)
(Western Australia) Patrick Cripps	East Fremantle	WAFL	AFL National Draft, first round (No. 13 overall)
(South Australia) Cameron Giles	Woodville-West Torrens	SANFL	AFL National Draft, third round (No. 39 overall)
(Victoria (state)) Nick Holman	Murray Bushrangers	TAC Cup	AFL National Draft, third round (No. 51 overall)
(South Australia) Luke Reynolds	Port Adelaide	SANFL	AFL Rookie Draft, first round (No. 12 overall)
(South Australia) Cameron Wood	Williamstown	VFL	AFL Rookie Draft, second round (No. 28 overall)
(Western Australia) Blaine Johnson	South Fremantle	WAFL	AFL Rookie Draft, third round (No. 43 overall)

=== Out ===
Player	New Club	League	via
(Tasmania) Marcus Davies	Port Melbourne	VFL	Delisted
(Tasmania) Aaron Joseph	Glenelg	SANFL	Delisted
(Victoria (state)) Luke Mitchell	North Adelaide	SANFL	Delisted
(South Australia) Patrick McCarthy	Glenelg	SANFL	Delisted
(Victoria (state)) Andrew Collins	Bridgewater (as playing coach)	Loddon Valley FL	Delisted from the rookie list
(Victoria (state)) Frazer Dale	South Adelaide	SANFL	Delisted from the rookie list
(South Australia) Rhys O'Keeffe	North Adelaide	SANFL	Delisted from the rookie list
(Victoria (state)) Eddie Betts	Adelaide	AFL	Signed as a restricted free agent
(Queensland) Shaun Hampson	Richmond	AFL	AFL Trade Period, in exchange for a second-round draft pick (No. 28 overall)
(Victoria (state)) Jeremy Laidler	Sydney	AFL	Delisted; signed by Sydney as a free agent

=== List management ===
Player	Change
National draft	Carlton received no free agency compensation draft picks, after the loss of Eddie Betts and the acquisition of Dale Thomas were deemed to have offset each other.
(Victoria (state)) Ed Curnow	Promoted from the rookie list to the senior list during AFL National Draft, fourth round (No. 67 overall)
(Queensland) Tom Bell	Promoted from the rookie list to the senior list during AFL National Draft, fifth round (No. 78 overall)
(Victoria (state)) Heath Scotland	Delisted, then redrafted as a rookie in the AFL Rookie Draft, fourth round (No. 53 overall).
(South Australia) Nick Duigan	Retired from playing on 9 December 2013, after one month of pre-season training, due to ongoing problems with knee and ankle injuries. Duigan's retirement came after the 2014 playing list had been finalized, so he remained on the list during the season, and was placed permanently on the long-term injury list.
(Victoria (state)) Heath Scotland	Prior to the NAB Challenge, elevated from the rookie list to the senior list as a nominated rookie
(Victoria (state)) Jaryd Cachia	Prior to the NAB Challenge, elevated from the rookie list to the senior list as a nominated rookie
(Victoria (state)) Heath Scotland (Western Australia) Blaine Johnson	Scotland retired from playing on 20 May 2014, due to ongoing problems with ankle injuries, and was placed permanently on the long-term injury list until the end of the season. Johnson was elevated from the rookie list to the senior list in Scotland's place.
(Western Australia) Josh Bootsma	Sacked on 3 June 2014 for breaking the club's and AFL's codes of conduct.

== Season summary ==
=== Pre-season matches ===
The first two practice matches were played as part of the 2014 NAB Challenge, and were played under modified pre-season rules, including nine-point goals. The final practice match was not part of the NAB Challenge, and was played under premiership season rules.

**Rd**	**Date and local time**	**Opponent**	**Scores** (Carlton's scores indicated in **bold**)			**Venue**	**Attendance**
**Rd**	**Date and local time**	**Opponent**	Home	Away	Result	**Venue**	**Attendance**
1	Saturday, 15 February (4:40 pm)	North Melbourne	0.14.9 (93)	**1.14.7 (100)**	Won by 7 points	Eureka Stadium (A)	7,800 (approx.)
2	Monday, 24 February (7:10 pm)	Adelaide	**0.9.7 (61)**	1.13.12 (99)	Lost by 38 points	Etihad Stadium (H)	7,617
3	Friday, 7 March (4:00 pm)	Western Bulldogs	**9.12 (66)**	12.11 (83)	Lost by 17 points	Visy Park (H)	4,000 (approx.)

=== Home and away season ===
**Rd**	**Date and local time**	**Opponent**	**Scores** (Carlton's scores indicated in **bold**)			**Venue**	**Attendance**	**Ladder** **position**
**Rd**	**Date and local time**	**Opponent**	Home	Away	Result	**Venue**	**Attendance**	**Ladder** **position**
1	Sunday, 16 March (7:40 pm)	Port Adelaide	**12.15 (87)**	18.12 (120)	Lost by 33 points	Etihad Stadium (H)	24,460	12th
2	Thursday, 27 March (7:45 pm)	Richmond	14.14 (98)	**12.14 (86)**	Lost by 12 points	Melbourne Cricket Ground (A)	62,037	13th
3	Sunday, 6 April (7:10 pm)	Essendon	21.12 (138)	**8.9 (57)**	Lost by 81 points	Melbourne Cricket Ground (A)	62,730	15th
4	Saturday, 12 April (1:45 pm)	Melbourne	**7.16 (58)**	12.9 (81)	Lost by 23 points	Melbourne Cricket Ground (H)	37,323	17th
5	Sunday, 20 April (7:40 pm)	Western Bulldogs	13.13 (91)	**18.11 (119)**	Won by 28 points	Etihad Stadium (A)	27,986	16th
6	Saturday, 26 April (4:40 pm)	West Coast	**14.8 (92)**	12.17 (89)	Won by 3 points	Etihad Stadium (H)	31,005	16th
7	Friday, 2 May (7:50 pm)	Collingwood	**10.10 (70)**	14.20 (104)	Lost by 34 points	Melbourne Cricket Ground (H)	68,251	16th
8	Monday, 12 May (7:20 pm)	St Kilda	9.15 (69)	**15.11 (101)**	Won by 32 points	Etihad Stadium (A)	26,708	13th
9	Bye							13th
10	Sunday, 25 May (4:40 pm)	Adelaide	**12.9 (81)**	10.16 (76)	Won by 5 points	Melbourne Cricket Ground (H)	32,419	12th
11	Saturday, 31 May (4:40 pm)	Brisbane Lions	14.14 (98)	**13.13 (91)**	Lost by 7 points	The Gabba (A)	24,625	12th
12	Friday, 6 June (7:50 pm)	Geelong	16.11 (107)	**15.12 (102)**	Lost by 5 points	Etihad Stadium (A)	36,952	12th
13	Friday, 13 June (7:50 pm)	Hawthorn	**13.12 (90)**	18.10 (118)	Lost by 28 points	Melbourne Cricket Ground (H)	49,615	12th
14	Sunday, 22 June (1:10 pm)	GWS	15.10 (100)	**14.8 (92)**	Lost by 8 points	Spotless Stadium (A)	9,059	12th
15	Sunday, 29 June (7:10 pm)	Collingwood	13.13 (91)	**11.10 (76)**	Lost by 15 points	Melbourne Cricket Ground (A)	40,936	14th
16	Sunday, 6 July (1:10 pm)	St Kilda	**24.7 (151)**	10.6 (66)	Won by 85 points	Etihad Stadium (H)	29,997	13th
17	Saturday, 12 July (7:40 pm)	Sydney	18.14 (122)	**7.9 (51)**	Lost by 71 points	Sydney Cricket Ground (A)	34,965	14th
18	Friday, 18 July (7:50 pm)	North Melbourne	**16.13 (109)**	13.8 (86)	Won by 23 points	Etihad Stadium (H)	36,689	13th
19	Thursday, 31 July (6:10 pm)	Fremantle	12.11 (83)	**11.12 (78)**	Lost by 5 points	Patersons Stadium (A)	35,401	13th
20	Saturday, 9 August (2:10 pm)	Gold Coast	**14.13 (97)**	8.10 (58)	Won by 39 points	Etihad Stadium (H)	28,840	13th
21	Friday, 15 August (7:50 pm)	Geelong	**11.10 (76)**	11.16 (82)	Lost by 6 points	Etihad Stadium (H)	38,812	13th
22	Friday, 22 August (7:20 pm)	Port Adelaide	20.20 (140)	**5.7 (37)**	Lost by 103 points	Adelaide Oval (A)	52,505	13th
23	Saturday, 30 August (1:45 pm)	Essendon	**14.6 (90)**	13.12 (90)	Match drawn	Melbourne Cricket Ground (H)	56,658	13th

== Ladder ==
2014 AFL ladder
Pos	Team	Pld	W	L	D	PF	PA	PP	Pts	
1	Sydney	22	17	5	0	2126	1488	142.9	68	Finals series
2	Hawthorn (P)	22	17	5	0	2458	1746	140.8	68	Finals series
3	Geelong	22	17	5	0	2033	1787	113.8	68	Finals series
4	Fremantle	22	16	6	0	2029	1556	130.4	64	Finals series
5	Port Adelaide	22	14	8	0	2180	1678	129.9	56	Finals series
6	North Melbourne	22	14	8	0	2026	1731	117.0	56	Finals series
7	Essendon	22	12	9	1	1828	1719	106.3	50	Finals series
8	Richmond	22	12	10	0	1887	1784	105.8	48	Finals series
9	West Coast	22	11	11	0	2045	1750	116.9	44	
10	Adelaide	22	11	11	0	2175	1907	114.1	44	
11	Collingwood	22	11	11	0	1766	1876	94.1	44	
12	Gold Coast	22	10	12	0	1917	2045	93.7	40	
13	Carlton	22	7	14	1	1891	2107	89.7	30	
14	Western Bulldogs	22	7	15	0	1784	2177	81.9	28	
15	Brisbane Lions	22	7	15	0	1532	2212	69.3	28	
16	Greater Western Sydney	22	6	16	0	1780	2320	76.7	24	
17	Melbourne	22	4	18	0	1336	1954	68.4	16	
18	St Kilda	22	4	18	0	1480	2436	60.8	16	

Source: AFL Tables
Rules for classification: 1) points; 2) percentage; 3) number of points for.
(P) Premiers

== Team awards and records ==
Game records

- Round 6 – Carlton recorded a late come-from-behind win against West Coast. West Coast led by 24 points after 14 minutes of the final quarter, before Carlton scored five goals in ten minutes to take a six-point lead. West Coast missed three shots at goal in the final few minutes, hitting the post twice, and Carlton won by three points.
- Round 22 – Carlton's score of 5.7 (37) against Port Adelaide was its lowest in any match since Round 8, 2006.
- Round 22 – Carlton's losing margin of 103 points against Port Adelaide was its highest in any match since Round 16, 2007.
- Round 23 – Carlton and Essendon both gave up five-goal leads in their drawn match in the final round. Carlton kicked six goals to one in the first quarter to lead by 30 points; Essendon then kicked ten of the next eleven goals to take a 30-point lead early in the third quarter; Carlton recovered to take the lead midway through the final quarter, before a tight finish which ended in a draw.

Season records

- Carlton opened the season with four straight losses for the first time since 1989.

== Notable events ==
Special guernsey designs

The club wore three specially designed guernseys during the season:

- In Rounds 7, 13 and 23, against Collingwood, Hawthorn and Essendon respectively, the club wore its "Heritage Guernsey" as part of sesquicentennial celebrations. This guernsey featured the 1970s-era block-style monogram on the front, and listed the club's premierships years on the back.
- In Round 10 against Adelaide, the club wore the "Member Guernsey" as part of sesquicentennial celebrations. This guernsey featured the 1910s-era script monogram, and featured in small white print the names of members who pledged to appear on it.
- In Round 11, all clubs in the league wore an Indigenous Guernsey, as part of the AFL's Indigenous Round. Carlton's Guernsey, worn against Brisbane Lions, was the same as the home guernsey, except it displayed a boomerang underneath the monogram which was white but decorated in the style of aboriginal art; the F in the monogram was likewise decorated.

Sesquicentennial celebrations

In 2014, the club celebrated the 150th anniversary of its foundation in 1864. The club arranged several events in recognition of the milestone:

- Heritage and member-recognition guernseys were worn at a total of four matches during the season.
- On Sunday 3 May, a team of retired Carlton players (mostly from the 1990s era) played against a team of retired Collingwood players from the same era at Visy Park in the "Clash of the Old Foes". Collingwood 9.15 (69) defeated Carlton 7.7 (49) before a crowd of around 1,000, and the gate was donated to the Peter MacCallum Cancer Centre and the E. J. Whitten Foundation for Prostate Cancer Awareness.
- The club held a fan poll to vote on the 25 greatest moments in Carlton Football Club history, with the results revealed at the Round 10 match against Adelaide. The top five moments were:
1. The 1970 Grand Final, in which Carlton overcame a 44-point half-time deficit to beat Collingwood.
2. The specky taken by Alex Jesaulenko over Collingwood's Graeme Jenkin in the second quarter of the 1970 Grand Final.
3. The assist by Wayne Harmes on the game-winning goal by Ken Sheldon in the 1979 Grand Final win against Collingwood.
4. The tackle laid by Fraser Brown on Essendon's Dean Wallis in the final minute of Carlton's one-point victory in the 1999 Preliminary Final.
5. The 1995 premiership, in which the club won a then-record twenty home-and-away matches.
- The club named the best twelve players in its history, announcing the results on 14 June. The top twelve were, in order: John Nicholls, Stephen Kernahan, Bruce Doull, Alex Jesaulenko, Stephen Silvagni, Craig Bradley, Robert Walls, Wayne Johnston, Geoff Southby, Greg Williams, Ken Hands and Chris Judd.

Dismissal of Josh Bootsma

On 3 June, third-year defender Josh Bootsma was sacked from the club, with a year and a half remaining on his contract. The club's action was in response to an incident in which Bootsma sent explicit photographs over social media application Snapchat, which breached both Carlton's and the AFL's codes of conduct. The club also revealed that Bootsma had a history of problems with behaviour and dedication, having had a history of tardiness at training. Bootsma had played fourteen games for the club, but none in 2014.

Suspensions of Mitch Robinson and Jeff Garlett

Mitch Robinson and Jeff Garlett were involved in a brawl outside a night venue on Lonsdale Street at 5am on the morning of Sunday 3 August, which left Robinson with a fractured eye-socket. The players lied to the club about the incident, with Robinson claiming to have fractured his eye-socket in a boxing session at training. As a consequence, the club fined Garlett $2,500 and refused to select him in the senior team for the following week – he had been dropped to the Northern Blues several weeks earlier, and was confirmed by the coaching staff as having shown enough form in the VFL to be brought back to the seniors immediately before the incident – and Robinson was fined $5,000, and did not play again for the season due to his injury. Neither player played another game for the club, as both were put up for trade at the end of the season: Garlett was traded to Melbourne, and Robinson was delisted after no deal was secured.

Robinson was cleared of wrongdoing by police, and Garlett pleated guilty to behaving in a riotous manner. The men on the other side of the attack pleaded guilty to affray and recklessly causing injury to Robinson, and were sentenced to 300 hours' community service.

== Individual awards and records ==
=== John Nicholls Medal ===
The Carlton Football Club Best and Fairest awards night took place on 17 September. The John Nicholls Medal, for the best and fairest player of the club, as well as several other awards, were presented on the night.

John Nicholls Medal

The winner of the John Nicholls Medal was Bryce Gibbs, who polled 105 votes. It was Gibbs' first John Nicholls Medal. Simpson won ahead of Marc Murphy and Kade Simpson. The top ten is given below.

Pos.	Player	Votes
1st	Bryce Gibbs	109
2nd	Marc Murphy	80
3rd	Kade Simpson	76
4th	Chris Yarran	
5th	Sam Rowe	
6th	Michael Jamison	
7th	Andrejs Everitt	
7th	Chris Judd	
9th	Sam Docherty	
10th	Dale Thomas	

Other awards

The following other awards were presented on John Nicholls Medal night:-

- Best First-Year Player – Ciarán Sheehan
- Best Clubman – Dylan Buckley
- Most Improved Player – Sam Rowe
- Spirit of Carlton Award – Dylan Buckley
- DI Count Award (for the player who led the club statistically in defensive indicators) – Sam Rowe
- Women of Carlton Player Ambassador – Simon White
- The Carltonians High Achiever Award – Kade Simpson
- Inner Blue Ruthness Award – Marc Murphy
- Hyundai MVP Award (the most valuable player as voted by fans in an online poll) – Bryce Gibbs

=== Leading Goalkickers ===
Jarrad Waite was Carlton's leading goalkicker for the season, with 29 goals. It was the first time Waite had won Carlton's goalkicking, in the last of his twelve seasons with the club.

Player	Goals	Behinds
Jarrad Waite	29	17
Lachlan Henderson	28	14
Troy Menzel	26	13
Chris Yarran	21	9
Bryce Gibbs	18	15

=== AFLPA Awards ===
For each of the AFLPA awards, one or three Carlton players were nominated following internal vote of Carlton players; Marc Murphy was also nominated for the Best Captain award by default. No Carlton player placed in the top five for his award.

Leigh Matthews Trophy (Most Valuable Player)

- Bryce Gibbs (nominated)
- Marc Murphy (nominated)
- Chris Yarran (nominated)

Robert Rose Award (Most Courageous Player)

- Kade Simpson (nominated)

Best First Year Player

- Blaine Johnson (nominated)

=== Other awards ===
All-Australian Team

Bryce Gibbs was Carlton's only nominee in the 40-man squad for the 2014 All-Australian team. He was not selected in the final team of 22.

NAB AFL Rising Star

The following Carlton players were nominated for the 2014 NAB AFL Rising Star award:

- Round 2 – Dylan Buckley (nominated)
- Round 16 – Troy Menzel (nominated)

Buckley was Carlton's first Rising Star nominee for more than three years; Carlton's previous nominee, Jeff Garlett (nominated Round 19, 2010) was in fact playing his 100th career game in the same match in which Buckley was nominated. Neither Buckley nor Menzel polled a vote for the final award.

Mark of the Year

Levi Casboult was one of the three nominees for the 2014 AFL Mark of the Year for the high mark he took from the back of a pack of five other players against Hawthorn in Round 13.

Australian Football Hall of Fame

Two former Carlton players were among the six people inducted into the Australian Football Hall of Fame in 2014:

- Ern Henfry, who played 84 games for Carlton from 1947 to 1952, twice won the Robert Reynolds Trophy and captained the club to the 1947 premiership
- Anthony Koutoufides, who played 278 games for Carlton from 1992 to 2007, twice won the Robert Reynolds Trophy and was part of the 1995 premiership team

== Northern Blues ==
The Carlton Football Club had a full affiliation with the Northern Blues during the 2014 season. It was the twelfth season of the clubs' affiliation, which had been in place since 2003. Carlton senior- and rookie-listed players who were not selected to play in the Carlton team were eligible to play for either the Northern Bullants seniors or reserves team in the Victorian Football League. As in 2013, home games were shared between the VFL club's traditional home ground, Preston City Oval, and Carlton's traditional home ground, Visy Park. The Northern Blues finished 11th out of 16 in the VFL with a record of 7–11, missing the final eight by ten premiership points and percentage.
