= 2012 Carlton Football Club season =

Carlton Football Club
2012 season
- President: Stephen Kernahan
- Coach: Brett Ratten
- Captain: Chris Judd
- Home grounds: Etihad Stadium (Training and administrative: Visy Park)
- AFL season: 10th
- Club membership: 45,800

The 2012 Carlton Football Club season was the Carlton Football Club's 149th season of competition, and 116th as a member of the Australian Football League.

After a strong start to the season which had Carlton sitting as premiership favourites after six weeks, performances declined and the team finished tenth out of eighteen teams in the 2012 AFL season, missing the finals for the first time since 2008 and resulting in the dismissal of senior coach Brett Ratten.

== Club summary ==
The 2012 AFL season was the 116th season of the VFL/AFL competition since its inception in 1897; and, having competed in every season, it was also the 116th season contested by the Carlton Football Club.

As in previous years, the club's primary home ground was Etihad Stadium, with home games expecting to draw larger crowds played at the M.C.G., and with traditional home ground Visy Park serving as the training and administrative base. The club's two joint major sponsors, car manufacturer Hyundai and confectionery company Mars, were unchanged from 2011. Carlton had a full alignment with the Northern Blues in the Victorian Football League, allowing Carlton-listed players to play with the Northern Blues when not selected in AFL matches; the VFL club, known as the Northern Bullants until 2011, changed its name and colours to match Carlton's this season.

The club's membership campaign slogan for 2012 was "I am Carlton"; the slogan was launched in Round 24, 2011. The club set a new membership record of 45,800, passing the 2011 record of 44,136 in May; the club had expected to reach 50,000 members after the strength of early season sales, but fell short of this target.

=== Senior Personnel ===
Brett Ratten continued in his role as senior coach of the club, entering his fifth and final season appointed to the job.^{Note 1} Ratten's contract was to have expired after the 2011 season, but after that season he was awarded a two-year extension which was to have seen him coach the club until 2013; this contract was ultimately terminated early at the end of the 2012 season, because the club failed to meet onfield expectations during the year.

Ratten's coaching panel for 2012 was joined by Western Bulldogs assistant coach Paul Williams, who had also served as the Bulldogs' caretaker coach for three matches at the end of the 2011 season. Williams was appointed to the new role of assistant coach in charge of midfield stoppages. Ruck assistant coach Matthew Capuano was given additional responsibilities in player development. Vic Country Under-18s coach Robert Hyde was appointed the Northern Blues senior coach on a part-time basis, however, he left the club at midseason, and development coach Darren Harris), who had been Northern Bullants coach in 2011, stepped back into the role for the remainder of the season.

Former club champion Stephen Kernahan continued as club president in the 2012 season, a position he has held since August 2008. General manager of football operations Steven Icke left the club at the end of the 2011, after serving in the role for five seasons. It has been speculated that Icke and Ratten did not enjoy a strong working relationship, and that Ratten's reappointment was in part responsible for Icke's departure. Icke was replaced by former club captain and premiership player Andrew McKay.

Chris Judd served as club captain for the fifth season, with Kade Simpson continuing as vice-captain. The leadership group was expanded from seven to eight players, with Jarrad Waite elevated into the group; the rest of the leadership group – Judd, Simpson, Andrew Carrazzo, Jordan Russell, Marc Murphy, Bryce Gibbs and Michael Jamison – was unchanged from 2011.

=== Financial position ===
Carlton posted an operating loss of around $680,000 in the 2012 season. It was the club's first loss for six seasons. This was attributed to a drop in crowds caused by poorer-than-expected onfield form, and severance payments to Brett Ratten and several of his assistant coaches when they were sacked with time remaining on their contracts following the season.

== Squad for 2012 ==
Flags represent the state of origin, i.e. the state in which the player played his Under-18s football.

Senior List
No.	State	Player	Age	AFL Debut	Recruited from	Career (to end 2011)		2012 Player Statistics
No.	State	Player	Age	AFL Debut	Recruited from	Gms	Gls	Gms	Gls	B	D	K	HB	M	T	HO
1	(Victoria (state))	Andrew Walker	25	2004	Bendigo (U18)	127	93	15	16	11	275	169	106	56	36	–
2	(South Australia)	Jordan Russell (lg)	25	2005	West Adelaide	109	18	7	–	1	85	39	46	32	26	–
3	(Victoria (state))	Marc Murphy (lg)	24	2006	Oakleigh (U18)	126	104	16	11	10	420	236	184	69	63	–
4	(South Australia)	Bryce Gibbs (lg)	22	2007	Glenelg	112	61	22	8	9	481	317	164	114	91	5
5	(Victoria (state))	Chris Judd (c)	28	2002	Sandringham (U18), West Coast	222	193	17	13	9	426	206	217	55	62	–
6	(Victoria (state))	Kade Simpson (vc)	27	2003	Eastern (U18)	157	96	19	15	13	426	267	159	106	62	3
7	(Victoria (state))	Dylan Buckley	18	—	Northern (U18)	–	–	–	–	–	–	–	–	–	–	–
8	(Victoria (state))	Matthew Kreuzer	22	2008	Northern (U18)	68	38	20	10	8	243	146	97	60	66	450
9	(Western Australia)	Kane Lucas	20	2010	East Fremantle	10	0	8	5	5	77	46	31	23	22	–
10	(Victoria (state))	Matthew Watson	19	2011	Calder (U18)	3	0	8	–	–	95	73	22	34	9	3
11	(Victoria (state))	Robert Warnock	24	2007	Sandringham (U18), Fremantle	53	12	5	–	1	35	19	16	8	12	158
12	(Tasmania)	Mitch Robinson	22	2009	Tasmania (U18/VFL)	49	29	18	12	10	379	213	166	94	93	17
13	(Western Australia)	Chris Yarran	21	2009	Swan Districts	45	31	18	9	8	264	197	67	73	31	–
14	(Victoria (state))	Brock McLean	25	2004	Calder (U18), Melbourne	104	42	15	10	8	388	179	209	78	78	2
15	(Victoria (state))	Jeremy Laidler	22	2009	Geelong (U18, AFL)	21	2	4	–	–	47	27	20	16	5	–
16	(Victoria (state))	Andrew Collins	23	2009	Bendigo (U18), Richmond	27	23	9	6	6	145	88	57	30	30	–
17	(Victoria (state))	Sam Rowe	24	—	Murray (U18), Sydney, Norwood	–	–	–	–	–	–	–	–	–	–	–
18	(Western Australia)	Paul Bower	23	2006	Peel	60	3	10	2	–	146	104	42	60	22	–
19	(Victoria (state))	Eddie Betts	25	2005	Calder (U18)	144	215	22	48	30	285	182	103	72	62	–
21	(Western Australia)	Josh Bootsma	18	2012	South Fremantle	–	–	5	–	1	49	30	19	12	13	–
22	(Queensland)	Shaun Hampson	23	2007	Mount Gravatt	44	14	13	15	4	120	61	59	51	24	240
23	(Victoria (state))	Lachlan Henderson	22	2007	Geelong (U18), Brisbane	49	31	11	3	4	133	97	36	59	19	1
24	(South Australia)	Pat McCarthy	19	2012	Glenelg	–	–	1	–	–	10	6	4	5	–	–
25	(Victoria (state))	Luke Mitchell	19	2012	Calder (U18)	–	–	1	1	2	8	7	1	3	–	2
26	(Victoria (state))	Andrew McInnes	19	2012	Dandenong (U18)	–	–	8	–	–	86	62	24	36	19	–
27	(Western Australia)	Dennis Armfield	25	2008	Swan Districts	60	9	21	16	6	299	186	113	73	58	–
29	(Victoria (state))	Heath Scotland	31	1999	Western (U18), Collingwood	223	72	21	2	6	553	283	270	116	72	–
30	(Victoria (state))	Jarrad Waite (lg)	28	2003	Murray (U18)	143	169	11	27	14	165	116	49	84	30	–
31	(Tasmania)	Marcus Davies	20	2010	North Hobart	13	1	2	–	–	11	10	1	3	2	–
32	(Victoria (state))	Bret Thornton	28	2002	Oakleigh (U18)	181	21	7	9	6	85	56	29	42	8	10
34	(South Australia)	Nick Duigan	27	2011	Norwood	22	1	16	5	1	198	105	93	49	47	–
36	(Victoria (state))	Rohan Kerr	20	–	Dandenong (U18)	–	–	–	–	–	–	–	–	–	–	–
38	(Western Australia)	Jeff Garlett	22	2009	Swan Districts	54	99	22	29	27	264	195	69	78	72	–
40	(Victoria (state))	Michael Jamison (lg)	25	2007	North Ballarat (U18, VFL)	71	1	16	–	2	202	131	71	75	28	–
43	(Western Australia)	Simon White	23	2010	Subiaco	12	2	5	–	–	53	31	22	24	9	–
44	(Victoria (state))	Andrew Carrazzo (lg)	28	2004	Oakleigh (U18), Geelong	140	41	14	5	1	345	155	190	53	66	–
45	(Tasmania)	Aaron Joseph	22	2009	Tasmania (U18)	56	9	13	1	–	157	95	62	43	29	–
46	(Western Australia)	David Ellard	22	2008	Swan Districts	27	18	10	4	8	186	114	72	34	56	1
Rookie List
No.	State	Player	Age	AFL Debut	Recruited from	Career (to end 2011)		2012 Player Statistics
No.	State	Player	Age	AFL Debut	Recruited from	Gms	Gls	Gms	Gls	B	D	K	HB	M	T	HO
20	(South Australia)	Rhys O'Keeffe	21	2011	North Adelaide	1	0	2	–	–	21	8	13	6	4	–
28	(Queensland)	Tom Bell	20	2012	Morningside	–	–	7	4	1	104	67	37	19	30	1
35	(Victoria (state))	Ed Curnow	22	2011	Geelong (U18), Adelaide, Box Hill	12	3	18	–	2	318	128	190	58	89	–
37	(Victoria (state))	Nicholas Heyne	21	2010	Gippsland (U18), St Kilda	3	0	–	–	–	–	–	–	–	–	–
39	(Victoria (state))	Frazer Dale	18	2012	Calder (U18)	–	–	2	1	–	7	5	2	2	3	1
41	(Victoria (state))	Levi Casboult	21	2012	Dandenong (U18)	–	–	6	7	12	54	37	17	31	12	43
42	(Republic of Ireland)	Zach Tuohy	22	2011	Laois GAA	11	3	19	5	1	208	129	79	39	60	–
47	(Western Australia)	Mitchell Carter	20	–	South Fremantle	–	–	–	–	–	–	–	–	–	–	–
48	(New South Wales)	Blake Bray	19	–	Western Suburbs	–	–	–	–	–	–	–	–	–	–	–
49	(New South Wales)	Matthew Lodge	18	–	Riverview	–	–	–	–	–	–	–	–	–	–	–
Senior coaching panel
	Born	Coach	Coaching position				Carlton Coaching debut		Former clubs as coach
	(Victoria (state))	Brett Ratten	Senior Coach				2007		Melbourne (a), Norwood (EFL) (s)
	(Victoria (state))	Alan Richardson	Senior Assistant Coach				2011		East Burwood (s), Coburg (s), Western Bulldogs (a), Collingwood (a), Essendon (a)
	(Victoria (state))	John Barker	Assistant coach (Forward)				2011		St Kilda (a), Hawthorn (a)
	(Victoria (state))	Gavin Brown	Assistant coach (Defense)				2011		Collingwood (a), Collingwood (VFL) (s)
	(Victoria (state))	Matthew Capuano	Assistant coach (Ruck) and Development Coach				2009
	(Western Australia)	Mark Riley	Assistant coach (Midfield)				2008		Claremont (s), Fremantle (d, a), Melbourne (a, cs)
	(Tasmania)	Paul Williams	Assistant coach (Midfield Stoppages)				2012		Melbourne (a), Western Bulldogs (a, cs)
	(Victoria (state))	Darren Harris	Development coach, Northern Blues senior coach (from 28 June)				2009		Wodonga Raiders (O&MFL) (s), NSW/ACT Rams (d), West Perth (s), West Coast (a), Northern Bullants (s)
	(Victoria (state))	Luke Webster	Development coach				2011

- For players: (c) denotes captain, (vc) denotes vice-captain, (lg) denotes leadership group.
- For coaches: (s) denotes senior coach, (cs) denotes caretaker senior coach, (a) denotes assistant coach, (d) denotes development coach.

== Playing list changes ==
The following summarises all player changes between the conclusion of the 2010 season and the conclusion of the 2011 season.

During trade week, both Setanta Ó hAilpín and Paul Bower requested to be traded, seeking more playing time than they had been receiving at Carlton, but ultimately Carlton did not engage in any trades. Bower was retained on the list, while Ó hAilpín was delisted; Carlton had not wanted to delist Ó hAilpín, but was forced to delist somebody due to AFL rules specifying that each club must make a minimum of three list changes after each season.

=== In ===
Player	Previous club	League	via
(Victoria (state)) Dylan Buckley	Northern Knights	TAC Cup	Selected under the Father–son rule without contest, using Carlton's last pick in the AFL National Draft (a third round pick, No. 62 overall)
(Western Australia) Josh Bootsma	South Fremantle	WAFL	AFL National Draft, first round (pick No. 22)
(Victoria (state)) Sam Rowe	Norwood	SANFL	AFL National Draft, second round (pick No. 44)
(Queensland) Tom Bell	Morningside	NEAFL	AFL Rookie Draft, first round (pick No. 14)
(Victoria (state)) Nicholas Heyne	St Kilda	AFL	AFL Rookie Draft, second round (pick No. 32)
(Victoria (state)) Frazer Dale	Calder Cannons	TAC Cup	AFL Rookie Draft, third round (pick No. 50)
(New South Wales) Matthew Lodge	Riverview	AFL Sydney	Elevated from NSW/ACT Scholarship during AFL Rookie Draft, fourth round (pick No. 67)

=== Out ===
Player	New Club	League	via
(Victoria (state)) Ryan Houlihan	Sydney Hills	NEAFL	Retired from the AFL
(Victoria (state)) Jaryd Cachia	Norwood	SANFL	Delisted from the rookie list
(Victoria (state)) Joe Dare	Cobden	Hampden FNL	Delisted from the rookie list
(Victoria (state)) Wayde Twomey	Swan Districts	WAFL	Delisted from the rookie list
(South Australia) Mark Austin	Western Bulldogs	AFL	Delisted
(Republic of Ireland) Setanta Ó hAilpín	GWS	AFL	Delisted

=== List management ===
Player	Change
(Victoria (state)) Nicholas Heyne	Received permission to join Carlton's 2012 pre-season training in November (before ultimately being drafted in December's rookie draft)
(Victoria (state)) Ed Curnow	Prior to Round 1, elevated from the rookie list to the senior list as a nominated rookie
(Republic of Ireland) Zach Tuohy	Prior to Round 1, elevated from the rookie list to the senior list as a nominated rookie
(Victoria (state)) Sam Rowe (Victoria (state)) Frazer Dale	Prior to Round 11, Rowe was moved to the long term injury list (testicular cancer), and Dale was elevated from the rookie list in his place
(Victoria (state)) Jeremy Laidler (Queensland) Tom Bell	Prior to Round 17, Laidler was moved to the long term injury list (knee), and Bell was elevated from the rookie list in his place
(Queensland) Shaun Hampson (Victoria (state)) Levi Casboult	Prior to Round 17, Hampson was moved to the long term injury list (knee), and Casboult was elevated from the rookie list in his place

== Season summary ==
The club ran a two-week preseason training camp for much of its playing list in Doha, Qatar, and a further week in Abu Dhabi, UAE, during October and November 2011. The camp was designed for high performance training: high ambient temperatures in the Middle East, and artificial high-altitude training facilities in Doha, were key reasons for the camp's location.

=== Pre-season matches ===
Carlton finished in outright last place out of eighteen teams in the 2012 NAB Cup, as the only team to lose all four roster matches; the club also lost the consolation practice match on NAB Cup Grand Final weekend to go through the entire pre-season winless. The result was made worse by the fact that none of Carlton's opponents were finalists from the 2011 Premiership Season; although, it was also partially redeemed by the fact that, with the exception of the second half against Brisbane Lions, in which Brisbane added nine goals to no score, all five matches were closely fought.

2012 NAB Cup

**Rd**	**Date and local time**	**Opponent**	**Scores** (Carlton's scores indicated in **bold**)			**Venue**	**Attendance**	**Ladder** **position**
**Rd**	**Date and local time**	**Opponent**	Home	Away	Result	**Venue**	**Attendance**	**Ladder** **position**
**Lightning matches**
1	Sunday, 26 February (2:40 pm)	Port Adelaide	0.6.10 (46)	**1.5.1 (40)**	Lost by 6 points Report	AAMI Stadium (A)	12,532	17th
1	Sunday, 26 February (3:50 pm)	Adelaide	1.5.4 (43)	**0.5.4 (34)**	Lost by 9 points Report	AAMI Stadium (A)	12,532	17th
**Full matches**
2	Sunday, 4 March (5:40 pm)	Western Bulldogs	0.11.8 (74)	**0.11.4 (70)**	Lost by 4 points Report	Etihad Stadium (A)	10,543	16th
3	Saturday, 10 March (3:20 pm)	Brisbane Lions	0.15.14 (104)	**0.6.4 (40)**	Lost by 64 points Report	Maroochydore (A)	5,147	18th
**Consolation match**
4	Sunday, 18 March (1:00 pm)	North Melbourne	**15.10 (100)**	18.8 (116)	Lost by 16 points Report	Visy Park (H)	9,783	N/A

=== Home and away season ===
After finishing 5th in 2011, the club entered the season with expectations of reaching the top four in 2012; the club, and coach Brett Ratten, made the bold move of stating this expectation publicly throughout the offseason. Even after the winless preseason, Carlton entered the season as the fourth favourite for the premiership with punters, behind Collingwood, Hawthorn and Geelong. With wins in the first three rounds, including a ten-goal win against Collingwood in Round 3, Carlton became equal premiership favourites, and after six rounds sat second on the ladder with a record of 5–1.

However, the club then lost six of its next seven games to fall to tenth on the ladder with a record of 6–7 after Round 14, which brought intense speculation in the media about the future of Ratten's tenure as coach. Carlton won five of its next seven games to stay in contention for eighth place, but was eliminated in Round 22 after losing and seeing other results fail to fall favourably. The club confirmed in the week following Round 22 that Ratten's contract would be terminated one year early; Ratten remained to coach the final match before departing. The club finished with an even record of 11–11. Recently retired Collingwood coach Mick Malthouse, who was rumoured throughout the season to be the most likely replacement for Ratten should he have been sacked, was appointed as Ratten's replacement shortly after the season.

Across the season, Carlton finished with records of:

- 3–6 in nine games against the eight finalists, with two wins against Collingwood and one against Fremantle; but, after Round 8 the record was only 1–6.
- 5–3 in eight games against the four similarly placed teams (those who finished between 9th and 13th, all of whom won between ten and twelve games).
- 3–2 in five games against the bottom five teams. None of the bottom five managed more than five wins for the season, but Carlton suffered upset losses against two of them: Port Adelaide and Gold Coast.

**Rd**	**Date and local time**	**Opponent**	**Scores** (Carlton's scores indicated in **bold**)			**Venue**	**Attendance**	**Ladder** **position**
**Rd**	**Date and local time**	**Opponent**	Home	Away	Result	**Venue**	**Attendance**	**Ladder** **position**
1	Thursday, 29 March (7:40 pm)	Richmond	12.9 (81)	**18.17 (125)**	Won by 44 points Report	M.C.G. (A)	78,285	4th
2	Thursday, 5 April (7:40 pm)	Brisbane Lions	9.9 (63)	**23.16 (154)**	Won by 91 points Report	Gabba (A)	25,920	2nd
3	Friday, 13 April (7:50 pm)	Collingwood	**18.14 (122)**	9.8 (62)	Won by 60 points Report	M.C.G. (H)	84,259	2nd
4	Saturday, 21 April (1:45 pm)	Essendon	**11.13 (79)**	15.19 (109)	Lost by 30 points Report	M.C.G. (H)	73,172	4th
5	Friday, 27 April (6:40 pm)	Fremantle	7.15 (57)	**10.5 (65)**	Won by 8 points Report	Patersons Stadium (A)	38,800	3rd
6	Sunday, 6 May (1:10 pm)	GWS	**15.20 (110)**	6.7 (43)	Won by 67 points Report	Etihad Stadium (H)	28,201	2nd
7	Monday, 14 May (7:40 pm)	St Kilda	19.8 (122)	**14.14 (98)**	Lost by 24 points Report	Etihad Stadium (A)	38,823	4th
8	Sunday, 20 May (3:15 pm)	Adelaide	**8.7 (55)**	19.10 (124)	Lost by 69 points Report	Etihad Stadium (H)	35,917	7th
9	Sunday, 27 May (3:15 pm)	Melbourne	**15.17 (107)**	6.13 (49)	Won by 58 points Report	M.C.G. (H)	28,371	6th
10	Saturday, 2 June (7:10 pm)	Port Adelaide	14.15 (99)	**6.9 (45)**	Lost by 54 points Report	AAMI Stadium (A)	24,476	7th
11	Friday, 8 June (7:50 pm)	Geelong	**11.19 (85)**	14.13 (97)	Lost by 12 points Report	Etihad Stadium (H)	47,632	9th
12	Thursday, 14 June (5:40 pm)	West Coast	10.19 (79)	**10.9 (69)**	Lost by 10 points Report	Patersons Stadium (A)	34,224	9th
13	Bye							9th
14	Friday, 29 June (7:50 pm)	Hawthorn	**10.10 (70)**	18.12 (120)	Lost by 50 points Report	M.C.G. (H)	65,047	10th
15	Friday, 6 July (7:50 pm)	Collingwood	8.14 (62)	**12.13 (85)**	Won by 23 points Report	M.C.G. (A)	75,755	9th
16	Friday, 13 July (7:50 pm)	North Melbourne	24.5 (149)	**14.12 (96)**	Lost by 53 points Report	Etihad Stadium (A)	43,423	12th
17	Saturday, 21 July (7:40 pm)	Western Bulldogs	12.12 (84)	**16.6 (102)**	Won by 18 points Report	Etihad Stadium (A)	24,615	11th
18	Saturday, 28 July (7:40 pm)	Richmond	**14.11 (95)**	13.13 (91)	Won by 4 points Report	M.C.G. (H)	46,013	11th
19	Sunday, 5 August (3:15 pm)	Sydney	**10.11 (71)**	14.9 (93)	Lost by 22 points Report	Etihad Stadium (H)	36,942	11th
20	Saturday, 11 August (7:40 pm)	Brisbane Lions	**17.11 (113)**	10.17 (77)	Won by 36 points Report	Etihad Stadium (H)	25,977	11th
21	Saturday, 18 August (1:45 pm)	Essendon	8.12 (60)	**24.12 (156)**	Won by 96 points Report	M.C.G. (A)	59,381	9th
22	Saturday, 25 August (7:40 pm)	Gold Coast	15.8 (98)	**11.20 (86)**	Lost by 12 points Report	Metricon Stadium (A)	15,251	10th
23	Sunday, 2 September (1:10 pm)	St Kilda	**12.19 (91)**	16.10 (106)	Lost by 15 points Report	Etihad Stadium (H)	31,393	10th

=== Home-and-away ladder ===
2012 AFL ladder
Pos	Team	Pld	W	L	D	PF	PA	PP	Pts	
1	Hawthorn	22	17	5	0	2679	1733	154.6	68	Finals series
2	Adelaide	22	17	5	0	2428	1833	132.5	68	Finals series
3	Sydney (P)	22	16	6	0	2290	1629	140.6	64	Finals series
4	Collingwood	22	16	6	0	2123	1823	116.5	64	Finals series
5	West Coast	22	15	7	0	2244	1807	124.2	60	Finals series
6	Geelong	22	15	7	0	2209	1886	117.1	60	Finals series
7	Fremantle	22	14	8	0	1956	1691	115.7	56	Finals series
8	North Melbourne	22	14	8	0	2359	2097	112.5	56	Finals series
9	St Kilda	22	12	10	0	2347	1903	123.3	48	
**10**	Carlton	**22**	**11**	**11**	**0**	**2079**	**1925**	**108.0**	44	
11	Essendon	22	11	11	0	2091	2090	100.0	44	
12	Richmond	22	10	11	1	2169	1943	111.6	42	
13	Brisbane Lions	22	10	12	0	1904	2092	91.0	40	
14	Port Adelaide	22	5	16	1	1691	2144	78.9	22	
15	Western Bulldogs	22	5	17	0	1542	2301	67.0	20	
16	Melbourne	22	4	18	0	1580	2341	67.5	16	
17	Gold Coast	22	3	19	0	1509	2481	60.8	12	
18	Greater Western Sydney	22	2	20	0	1270	2751	46.2	8	

Rules for classification: 1) points; 2) percentage; 3) number of points for.
(P) Premiers

== Leading Goalkickers ==
Eddie Betts was Carlton's leading goalkicker for the season, with 48 goals. It was the second time Betts had won Carlton's goalkicking, after first winning it in 2010.

Player	Goals	Behinds
Eddie Betts	48	30
Jeff Garlett	29	27
Jarrad Waite	27	14
Andrew Walker	16	11
Dennis Armfield	16	6
Kade Simpson	15	13
Shaun Hampson	15	4
Chris Judd	13	9
Mitch Robinson	12	10
Marc Murphy	11	10

== Team awards and records ==
Game Records

- Round 5 – Carlton's score of 10.5 (65) in its win against Fremantle was its lowest winning score in any game since Round 11, 1996.
- Round 6 – Greater Western Sydney's score of 6.7 (43) was the lowest score conceded by Carlton since Round 5, 2004.

Other

- Round 3 – Carlton won the 2012 Richard Pratt Cup with its 60-point win over Collingwood. It was Carlton's first Richard Pratt Cup victory, in the fourth season of the trophy.
- Round 15 – Carlton won the 2012 Peter Mac Cup with its 23-point win over Collingwood.
- Round 15 – Carlton's win ended Collingwood's ten-match winning streak, which ran from Round 4 until Round 14.

== Individual awards and records ==
=== John Nicholls Medal ===
The Carlton Football Club Best and Fairest awards night took place on 28 September. The John Nicholls Medal, for the best and fairest player of the club, as well as several other awards, were presented on the night.

John Nicholls Medal

The voting system for the John Nicholls Medal remained the same as it had been since 2008. In each match, the five members of the Match Committee awarded votes. Each committee member could award votes to up to eight players, and each player could receive up to ten votes from each judge. The player with the most total votes across all premiership season matches (including home and away matches and finals) wins the award.

The winner of the John Nicholls Medal was Heath Scotland, who polled 362 votes. It was Scotland's first John Nicholls Medal, having previously finished second in 2007. Scotland won narrowly ahead of Eddie Betts (353 votes). The top ten is given below.

Pos.	Player	Votes
1st	Heath Scotland	362
2nd	Eddie Betts	353
3rd	Chris Judd	334
4th	Brock McLean	321
5th	Marc Murphy	299
6th	Andrew Carrazzo	287
7th	Kade Simpson	229
8th	Bryce Gibbs	228
9th	Mitch Robinson	205
10th	Matthew Kreuzer	163

Other awards

The following other awards were presented on John Nicholls Medal night:-

- Best First-Year Player – Tom Bell
- Best Clubman – Dennis Armfield
- Spirit of Carlton Encouragement Award – Dennis Armfield
- Women of Carlton Player Ambassador – Shaun Hampson
- The Carltonians High Achiever Award – Heath Scotland
- Blues Coterie "Most Determined" Award – Brock McLean
- Inner Blue Ruthness Award – Brock McLean

=== AFLPA Awards ===
For each of the AFLPA awards, one or three Carlton players were nominated following internal vote of Carlton players; Chris Judd was also nominated for the Best Captain award by default. None of Carlton's nominees won or placed in their awards.

Leigh Matthews Trophy (Most Valuable Player)

- Eddie Betts (nominated)
- Andrew Carrazzo (nominated)
- Chris Judd (nominated)

Robert Rose Award (Most Courageous Player)

- Kade Simpson (nominated)

Best First Year Player

- Tom Bell (nominated)

=== Other awards ===
All-Australian Team

Eddie Betts was Carlton's only nominee in the 40-man squad for the 2012 All-Australian team. He was not selected in the final All-Australian team of 22.

Goal of the Year

Chris Yarran was the winner of the 2012 Goal of the Year, for his Round 1 goal in which he gathered a loose ball on the half-forward flank, evaded three opponents and skirted the boundary line before goaling from 50m.

The following Carlton players won the Goal of the Week during the 2012 season.

- Goal of the Week:
  - Chris Yarran, Round 1
  - Marc Murphy, Round 2
  - Jeff Garlett, Round 5
  - Paul Bower, Round 6
  - Eddie Betts, Round 11
  - Chris Yarran, Round 15
  - Levi Casboult, Round 21

Mark of the Year

The following Carlton players won the Mark of the Week during the 2012 season:

  - Eddie Betts, Round 2
  - Andrew Walker, Round 6
  - Andrew Walker, Round 11

Other

- Andrew Carrazzo won the Richard Pratt Medal as best on ground in Carlton's Richard Pratt Cup victory over Collingwood in Round 3.
- At the post-season AGM, Eddie Betts and Jordan Russell were awarded life membership to the club in recognition of eight years service.

=== Player records ===
- Round 2 – Brett Ratten became the third person to both play and coach 100 senior games for the Carlton Football Club, after Ken Hands and Norm Clark.
- Round 16 – Kade Simpson (broken jaw) was missing from the Carlton team for the first time since Round 14, 2005, bringing to an end his streak of 158 consecutive games played.
- Round 23 – Luke Mitchell, on his AFL debut, kicked a goal with his first kick.

=== Milestones ===
Player	Milestone	Round
Lachlan Henderson	50 AFL games	Round 1
Mitch Robinson	50 AFL games	Round 1
Brett Ratten	100 AFL games as coach	Round 2
Eddie Betts	150 AFL games	Round 6
Shaun Hampson	50 AFL games	Round 6
Kade Simpson	150 consecutive AFL games	Round 6
Josh Bootsma	AFL debut	Round 6
Chris Yarran	50 AFL games	Round 8
Chris Judd	100 AFL games for Carlton	Round 14
Andrew McInnes	AFL debut	Round 15
Tom Bell	AFL debut	Round 17
Levi Casboult	AFL debut	Round 17
Frazer Dale	AFL debut	Round 17
Andrew Carrazzo	150 AFL games	Round 18
Jarrad Waite	150 AFL games	Round 19
Luke Mitchell	AFL debut	Round 23
Patrick McCarthy	AFL debut	Round 23

== Northern Blues ==
In 2012, Carlton had a full alignment with the Northern Blues in the Victorian Football League, allowing Carlton-listed players to play with the Northern Blues when not selected in AFL matches. The Northern Blues played home matches at both Visy Park and Preston City Oval. It was the tenth season of the affiliation between the two clubs, and the first in which the VFL club used the nickname 'Blues'; until 2011, the club was known as the Northern Bullants. The VFL club adopted a navy blue and white guernsey similar to Carlton's this season; its traditional red and white colours were retained to be worn in matches at Preston City Oval, and when needed as a clash strip.

Vic Country Under-18s coach Robert Hyde was appointed the Northern Blues senior coach on a part-time basis at the start of the season, taking over from Carlton development coach Darren Harris. However, this arrangement lasted only until midseason, with Hyde leaving the club on 28 June after he and the Carlton Football Club agreed that his role could not be effectively carried out by a part-time coach. The appointment had been unusual in the first place, as the previous three Northern Bullants senior coaches during the period of the clubs' affiliation (Barry Mitchell, David Teague and Harris) had all been full-time coaches at Carlton. Harris stepped back into the VFL senior coaching role after Hyde's departure.

After sitting on the bottom of the VFL ladder at the time of Hyde's departure, the Northern Blues finished tenth out of thirteen with a record of 6–10, to miss the finals.

== Footnotes ==
:1. Ratten also served as head coach in the final six rounds of 2007 as caretaker, before being officially appointed as head coach for 2008.
