= Blaine Johnson (footballer) =

Australian rules footballer

Personal information
- Born: 28 July 1995 (age 31)
- Original team: South Fremantle
- Height: 187 cm (6 ft 2 in)
- Weight: 83 kg (183 lb)

Playing career^{1}
Years	Club	Games (Goals)
2014–2015	Carlton	7 (1)
- ^{1} Playing statistics correct to the end of 2015.

Blaine Johnson (born 28 July 1995) is a former professional Australian rules footballer who played for the Carlton Football Club in the Australian Football League (AFL).

Johnson plays primarily as a medium-sized leading forward. Originally from Western Australia, Johnson played junior football for the Kwinana Junior Knights in the South Fremantle District; in 2012 and 2013 he played colts football for South Fremantle in the West Australian Football League (WAFL), breaking through for two senior WAFL games in 2013.

Johnson was recruited by the Carlton Football Club as a rookie with a third round selection in the 2014 AFL Rookie Draft (No. 43 overall). He played initially with Carlton's VFL-affiliate, the Northern Blues, and made his AFL debut in Round 15, 2014 against Collingwood. He was delisted at the conclusion of the 2015 season.
