= Paul Bower =

Australian rules footballer

Personal information
- Full name: Paul Bower
- Born: 9 January 1988 (age 38)
- Original team: Peel Thunder (WAFL)
- Draft: No. 20, 2005 National Draft, Carlton
- Height: 194 cm (6 ft 4 in)
- Weight: 92 kg (203 lb)
- Position: Defender

Playing career^{1}
Years	Club	Games (Goals)
2006–2012	Carlton	70 (5)
- ^{1} Playing statistics correct to the end of 2014.

Career highlights
- Carlton Past Players Encouragement Award 2007

Paul Bower (born 9 January 1988) is an Australian rules footballer who formerly played for the Carlton Football Club in the Australian Football League.

He was recruited as the number 20 draft pick by Carlton in the 2005 AFL draft from Peel Thunder. He played the first half of the season in the Northern Bullants as a safe-marking backman, before missing two months through injury. Shortly after returning from injury, he made his AFL debut in Round 21 of the 2006 AFL season, playing the final two games of the year.

He began to gain regular selection in 2008, playing as the second tall defender. He played several very good defensive games, before sustaining a shoulder injury in Round 10 against Geelong which saw him miss ten games. He returned for the final two rounds of the year.

2009 was a breakthrough season for Bower. He began to take more difficult defensive roles, added a strong rebounding aspect to his game, and began to show strong leadership amongst the young Carlton defenders. Bower would ultimately finish seventh in the John Nicholls Medal, after being as high as second after thirteen rounds. However, his 2010 and 2011 seasons were hindered by repeated injuries to his quadriceps; he played only fifteen games across the two seasons, and did not match his 2009 form.

At the conclusion of the 2011 season, Bower was close to being delisted due to league rules requiring at least three players be delisted each year. The decision came down to being between Bower and Setanta Ó hAilpín, and Bower was ultimately retained due mostly to Ó hAilpín being five years older. He played a further ten games in 2012, but was delisted at the end of the season. Michael Malthouse describes Bower’s delisting as ‘the most disgraceful day in Carlton history’ and ‘a stain on the great game that is football.’ (Source?)

== Post-AFL career ==
After being delisted, Bower returned to Peel Thunder for the 2013 WAFL season. In 2014, he returned to Melbourne and signed with Heidelberg in the Northern Football League, where he remains as of 2017.

Of Māori heritage, Bower is one of the few Maori Australians in the history of the VFL/AFL and proudly wears a tribal tattoo on his left arm.
