= Andrew McInnes =

Australian rules footballer

Personal information
- Born: 20 March 1992 (age 34)
- Original team: Dandenong Stingrays
- Height: 191 cm (6 ft 3 in)
- Weight: 86 kg (190 lb)

Playing career^{1}
Years	Club	Games (Goals)
2012–2014	Carlton	17 (1)
- ^{1} Playing statistics correct to the end of 2014.

Andrew McInnes (born 20 March 1992) is an Australian rules footballer in the Australian Football League.

== Background ==
McInnes plays primarily as a defender. Originally from Victoria, McInnes played junior football for the Devon Meadows Football Club in Casey-Cardinia, and played TAC Cup football for the Dandenong Stingrays. He represented Vic Country at the 2010 AFL Under 18 Championships.

McInnes was recruited by the Carlton Football Club with a fourth round selection in the 2010 AFL National Draft (No. 67 overall). He was given guernsey number 26. He played the entire 2011 season and the first half of the 2012 season with Carlton's VFL-affiliate, the Northern Bullants (known as the Blues from 2012), before making his AFL debut in Round 15, 2012 against Collingwood. He held his place in the team for the next two months, impressing with reliable performances in the backline, before suffering an ACL injury in his eighth game.

He returned in mid-2013, and played another eight games during the season, including both of Carlton's finals. McInnes was delisted at the end of the 2014 season after managing only a single senior game during the year.

In 2015, McInnes played for Norwood in the South Australian National Football League. In 2016, he returned to Victoria and played for VFL club Frankston.
