= Nick Graham (Australian footballer) =

Australian rules footballer (born 1994)

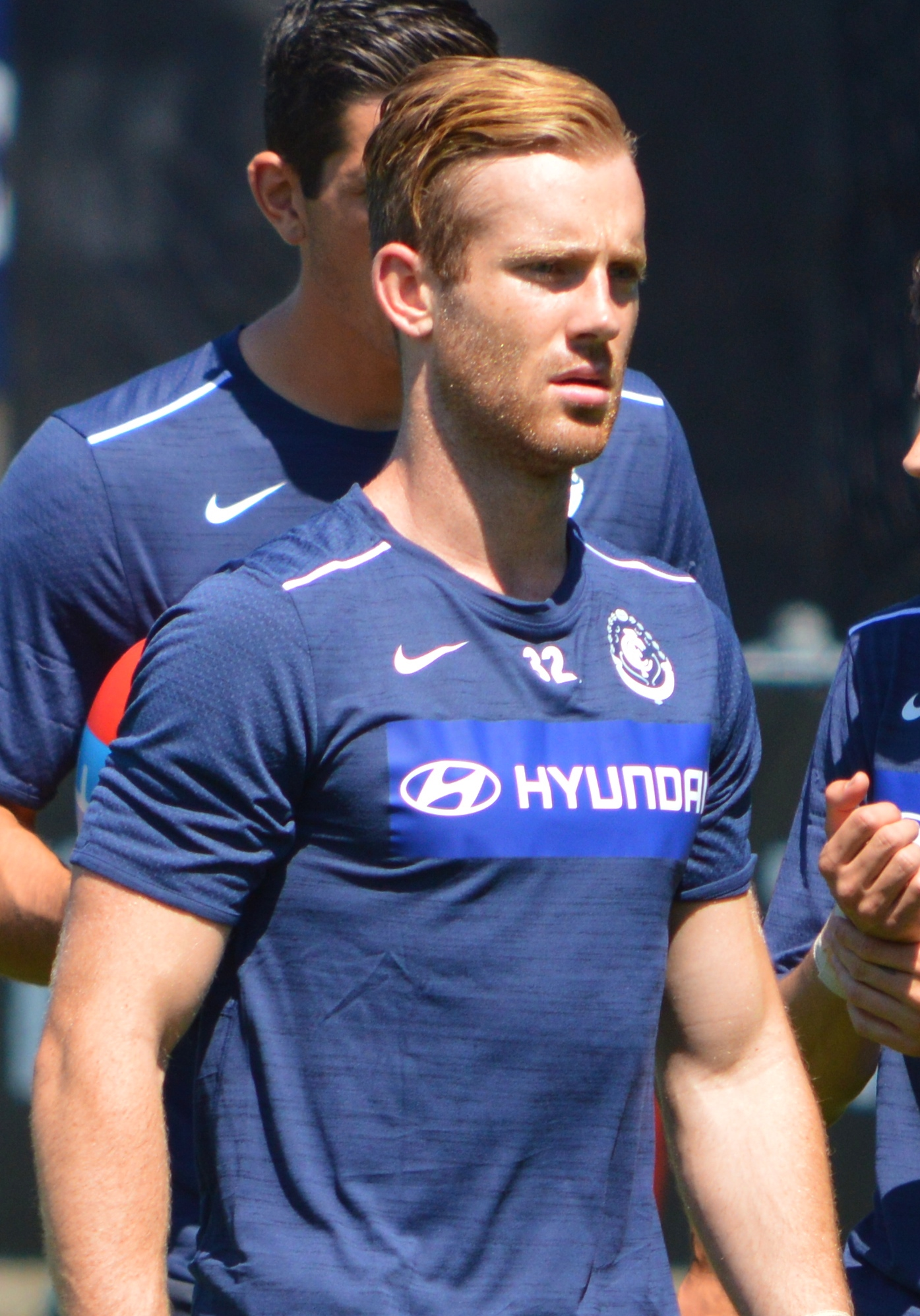
- Graham warming-up for Carlton in March 2017

Personal information
- Full name: Nicholas Graham
- Born: 12 June 1994 (age 32)
- Original team: Gippsland Power
- Draft: 54th overall 2012 AFL National Draft, Carlton
- Height: 182 cm (6 ft 0 in)
- Weight: 80 kg (176 lb)
- Position: Midfielder

Playing career^{1}
Years	Club	Games (Goals)
2013–2018	Carlton	48 (11)
- ^{1} Playing statistics correct to the end of 2018.

Career highlights
- Morrish Medal: 2012

Nicholas Graham (born 12 June 1994) is a former Australian rules footballer who played for the Carlton Football Club in the Australian Football League.

== Career ==
Primarily a midfielder, Graham played his junior football for TEDAS in the Traralgon & District Junior Football League, and for Traralgon-Tyers United in the North Gippsland Football League, before playing TAC Cup football for Gippsland Power. In 2012, Graham won the Morrish Medal as the best and fairest in the TAC Cup, as well as placing in the TAC Cup team of the year and representing Vic Country at the AFL Under 18 Championships.

== AFL career ==
He was recruited to the Australian Football League by the Carlton Football Club with its third round selection in the 2012 AFL National Draft (pick No. 54 overall).

Graham made his senior AFL debut in round 21, 2013.

He was delisted at the end of the 2018 season. Graham currently holds the record for most-dropped player in VFL/AFL history, having over the course of his career been dropped from the best twenty-two twenty-two times.
