= Nick Heyne =

Australian rules footballer

Nicholas Heyne

Personal information
- Full name: Nicholas Heyne
- Born: 22 July 1990 (age 36)
- Original team: Gippsland Power / Orbost
- Draft: No. 48, 2008 AFL draft, (St Kilda); No. 32, 2012 Rookie Draft, Carlton
- Height: 187 cm (6 ft 2 in)
- Weight: 79 kg (174 lb)
- Position: Forward / Wing

Playing career^{1}
Years	Club	Games (Goals)
2009–11	St Kilda	3 (0)
- ^{1} Playing statistics correct to the end of 2011.

Nicholas Heyne (born 22 July 1990) is a former Australian rules footballer who played for St Kilda and Carlton in the Australian Football League (AFL).

== Playing career ==
=== 2009-11: Career with St Kilda ===
Heyne was recruited from Gippsland Power with a third round pick, 48th overall, in the 2008 AFL draft.

Heyne spent most of his first season playing with St Kilda's VFL-affiliate team Sandringham. He made his AFL debut in Round 8 of the 2010 season against Essendon. He played two more matches for the remainder of the season.

Heyne was delisted by the St Kilda Football Club after the 2011 season.

=== 2012: Career with Carlton ===
He trained with the Carlton Football Club in the 2012 pre-season, before being recruited as a rookie with a second-round pick in the 2012 Rookie Draft. He spent one season on the Carlton rookie list, and was delisted at the end of 2012 without playing a game.

=== 2013–present: Career with Ainsile (NEAFL) ===
In 2013, Heyne joined Ainslie in the North East Australian Football League.
