= Patrick McCarthy (Australian footballer) =

Australian rules footballer (born 1992)

Personal information
- Full name: Patrick McCarthy
- Born: 11 March 1992 (age 34)
- Original team: Glenelg (SANFL)
- Draft: No. 34, 2010 National Draft, Carlton
- Height: 196 cm (6 ft 5 in)
- Weight: 94 kg (207 lb)
- Position: Defender

Playing career^{1}
Years	Club	Games (Goals)
2012	Carlton	1 (0)
- ^{1} Playing statistics correct to the end of 2013.

Patrick "Pirren" McCarthy (born 11 March 1992) is an Australian rules footballer formerly in the Australian Football League.

== Career ==
McCarthy plays primarily as a tall defender. Originally from South Australia, McCarthy attended and played school football for Sacred Heart College in Somerton Park. He played under 18s and reserves football for the Glenelg Football Club in the SANFL up to the 2010 season, and he represented South Australia at the 2010 AFL Under 18 Championships, where he was selected as a defender in the Under 18 All-Australian team.

McCarthy was recruited by the Carlton Football Club with its second round selection in the 2010 AFL National Draft (No. 34 overall). He was given guernsey number 24. He played three seasons with Carlton, playing mostly for its VFL-affiliate, the Northern Bullants/Blues. He played his sole senior AFL match in the last round of the 2012 season.

McCarthy was delisted at the end of the 2013 season. He returned to play for Glenelg in 2014.
