= Jeff Garlett =

Australian rules footballer

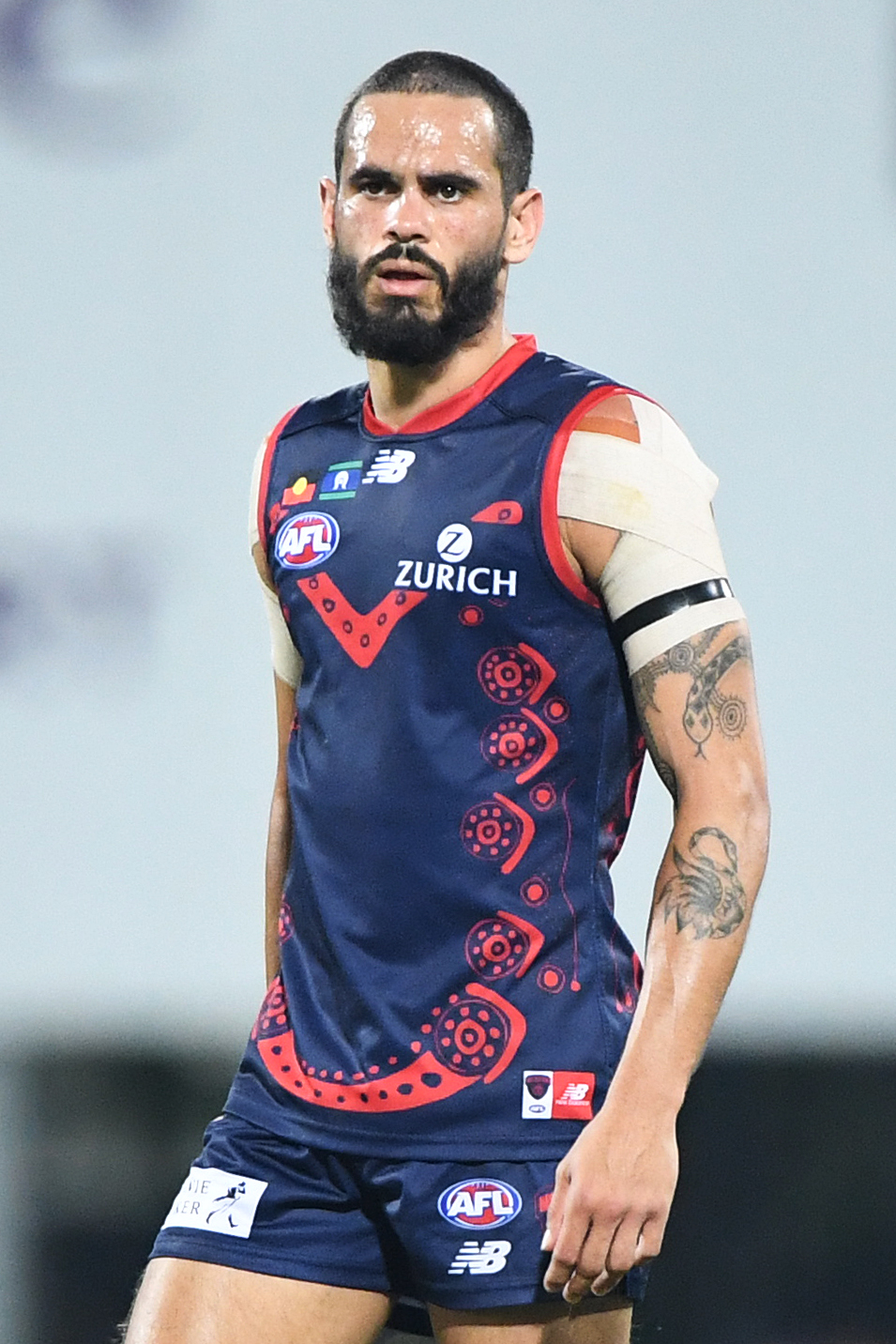
- Garlett playing for Melbourne in June 2019

Personal information
- Full name: Jeffrey Garlett
- Born: 3 August 1989 (age 37); Perth, Western Australia
- Original team: Swan Districts (WAFL)
- Draft: No. 6, 2009 rookie draft
- Debut: Round 1, 2009, Carlton vs. Richmond, at MCG
- Height: 180 cm (5 ft 11 in)
- Weight: 72 kg (159 lb)
- Position: Forward

Club information
- Current club: Melbourne
- Number: 36

Playing career^{1}
Years	Club	Games (Goals)
2009–2014	Carlton	107 (183)
2015–2019	Melbourne	78 (138)
Total		185 (321)
- ^{1} Playing statistics correct to the end of round 23, 2019.

Career highlights
- Carlton leading goalkicker: 2013; Melbourne leading goalkicker: 2017; AFL Rising Star nominee: 2010

Jeffrey Garlett (born 3 August 1989) is a former Australian rules footballer who played for the Melbourne Football Club and the Carlton Football Club in the Australian Football League (AFL). He is of Indigenous descent.

== Background ==
Garlett played his early football for Burracoppin, before playing for Swan Districts in the West Australian Football League in 2007. He lived with Anne and Maurice Embley (parents of many Swan Districts players, including West Coast's Andrew Embley) and with Swans captain Shane Beros. Altogether, Garlett played 21 league matches for Swans between 2007 and 2008.

== AFL career ==
=== Carlton (2009–2014) ===
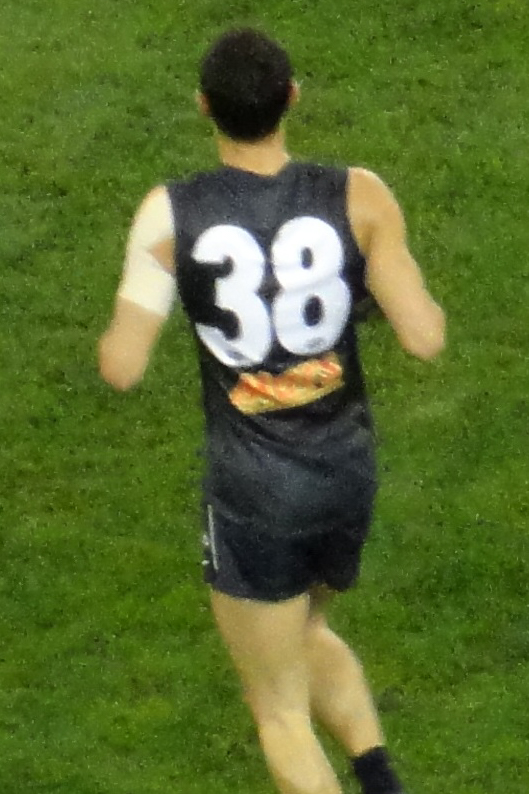
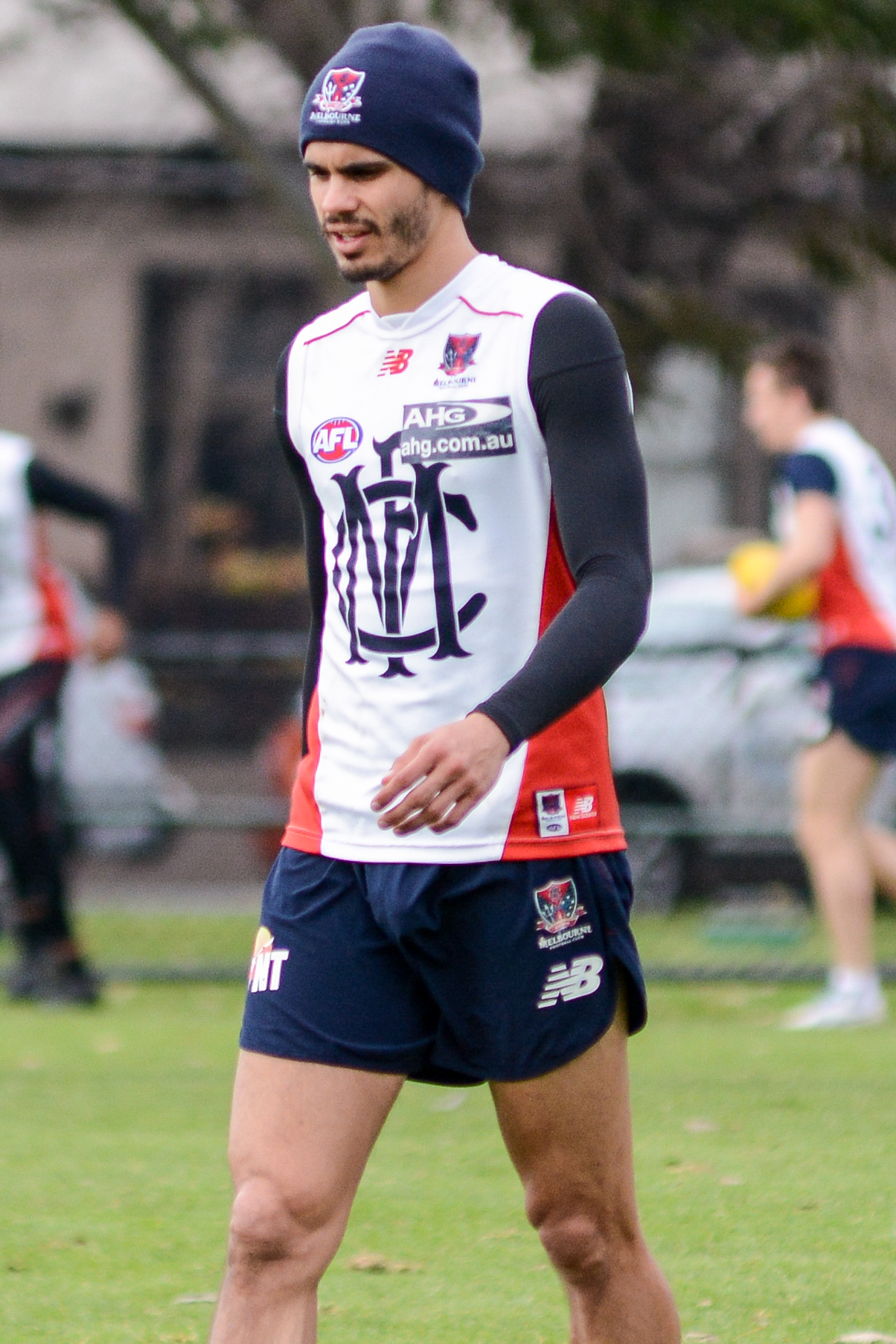
left: Garlett playing for Carlton in September 2011.
right: Garlett at Melbourne training in July 2015.

Garlett was recruited to the AFL by the Carlton Football Club with the sixth pick in the 2009 Rookie Draft. He joined indigenous Swan Districts teammate Chris Yarran at Carlton, who was drafted in the 2008 AFL draft at pick 6.

After playing in Carlton's 2009 NAB Cup series, he was elevated off the rookie list in place of injured ruckman Robert Warnock. He made his debut in Round 1, 2009 against Richmond at the Melbourne Cricket Ground, scoring a goal with his first kick. Garlett played ten games for Carlton in 2009, scoring twelve goals. Late in the season, he, as well as teammates Cameron Cloke and Eddie Betts, was internally suspended by Carlton for one game after failing to attend a recovery session.

Garlett was made a nominated rookie in 2010, and earned regular selection in the Carlton team. He scored a career-high six goals in Round 19 against Essendon and was subsequently rewarded for this by taking out the NAB Rising Star nomination for the round; he ultimately polled five votes to finish sixth for the Rising Star Award. He played twenty games for the year, and performed strongly in the club's best and fairest, finishing seventh. Throughout the season, he formed part of a short-lived forward-line structure consisting of tall full-forward Setanta Ó hAilpín, and three small forwards (Garlett, Eddie Betts and Chris Yarran) who became known as "Setanta's Little Helpers".

Garlett signed a two-year contract extension with the Blues, and moved onto the senior list proper in 2011. He played every game in 2011, and kicked 50 goals for the year.

=== Melbourne (2015–2019) ===
On 9 October 2014, Garlett was traded to the Melbourne Football Club after an off-field incident involving him and teammate Mitch Robinson. After a 78-game stint at Melbourne, which included a leading goalkicker award in 2017, Garlett was delisted at the conclusion of the 2019 season.

=== Caramut (2026) ===
For the 2026 season Garlett signed on for Caramut in the Mininera and District Football League, giving the struggling club and town in general a huge lift and drawcard. Garlett's contribution saw the Caramut Swans play and win their first final since 2008 alongside former Adelaide and Brisbane midfielder Cam Ellis-Yolmen, who he also lured to the club to play. Garlett has signed on to play again for 2027.

== Playing style ==
Garlett played as a small crumbing forward, and his main attributes were his pace and tackling/defensive pressure, which were very effective in spite of his very light build.

== Statistics ==
Statistics are correct to the end of the 2019 season

Legend
G	Goals	K	Kicks	D	Disposals	T	Tackles
B	Behinds	H	Handballs	M	Marks

Season	Team	No.	Games	Totals							Averages (per game)						
Season	Team	No.	Games	G	B	K	H	D	M	T	G	B	K	H	D	M	T
2009	Carlton	38	10	12	9	72	22	94	34	23	1.2	0.9	7.2	2.2	9.4	3.4	2.3
2010	Carlton	38	20	39	21	170	75	245	75	73	2.0	1.1	8.5	3.8	12.3	3.8	3.7
2011	Carlton	38	24	48	32	216	78	294	84	96	2.0	1.3	9.0	3.3	12.3	3.5	4.0
2012	Carlton	38	22	29	27	195	69	264	78	72	1.3	1.2	8.9	3.1	12.0	3.5	3.3
2013	Carlton	38	22	43	29	189	79	268	66	76	2.0	1.3	8.6	3.6	12.2	3.0	3.5
2014	Carlton	38	9	12	7	58	14	72	21	23	1.3	0.8	6.4	1.6	8.0	2.3	2.6
2015	Melbourne	36	22	40	31	175	50	237	62	90	1.8	1.4	8.0	2.8	10.8	2.8	4.1
2016	Melbourne	36	17	29	14	124	53	177	34	54	1.7	0.8	7.3	3.1	10.4	2.0	3.2
2017	Melbourne	36/67	21	42	28	171	65	236	56	74	2.0	1.3	8.1	3.1	11.2	2.7	3.5
2018	Melbourne	36	11	18	11	76	56	132	26	32	1.6	1.0	6.9	5.1	12.0	2.4	2.9
2019	Melbourne	36	7	9	9	47	21	68	19	22	1.3	1.3	6.7	3.0	9.7	2.7	3.1
Career			185	321	218	1493	594	2087	543	635	1.7	1.2	8.1	3.2	11.3	2.9	3.4

== Personal life ==
Garlett has many relatives who are also Australian rules footballers. He is cousins with Lance Franklin, Cruize Garlett and Des Headland, and is the nephew of Leon Davis. He has a son, born in 2012.
