= Josh Bootsma =

Australian rules footballer

Personal information
- Full name: Joshua Bootsma
- Born: 22 February 1993 (age 33)
- Original team: South Fremantle (WAFL)
- Draft: No. 22, 2011 AFL draft, Carlton
- Height: 190 cm (6 ft 3 in)
- Weight: 74 kg (163 lb)
- Positions: Defender, Wing

Playing career^{1}
| Years | Club | Games (Goals) |
| 2012–2014 | Carlton | 14 (2) |
- ^{1} Playing statistics correct to the end of 2014.

Joshua Bootsma (born 22 February 1993) is an Australian rules footballer and was listed with Peel Thunder in the West Australian Football League (WAFL) up until the end of 2016. He previously played for the Carlton Football Club in the Australian Football League (AFL), but had his contract terminated midway through the 2014 season, for breaching the club's and the AFL's codes of conduct.

== Background and junior career ==
Bootsma was born in 1993 into a football-oriented family, with his father Brad having played 163 WAFL matches for South Fremantle and 23 AFL matches for Fremantle in the 1990s and 2000s.

In 2011, Bootsma started the year playing for his local club North Albany, before joining WAFL side South Fremantle mid season. He went on to play 13 colts games for South Fremantle, including the premiership. Bootsma's 13 games for the Bulldogs saw his 2011 AFL draft prospects rise greatly, with him being touted by Kevin Sheehan as a potential top 30 pick. After attracting the attention of several AFL clubs, Bootsma was drafted by the Carlton Football Club with its first round selection in the 2011 AFL National draft (No. 22 overall). At the time he was drafted, Bootsma was in the process of completing an apprenticeship as an electrician. He was given guernsey number 21.

== AFL career ==
After starting the 2012 season playing for the Northern Blues in the Victorian Football League, Bootsma made his AFL debut in Round 6 against Greater Western Sydney, as a late replacement. On 3 June 2014, Bootsma's contract with Carlton was terminated for breaching the club's and the AFL's Codes of Conduct, related to inappropriate behaviour on social media. He returned to play for Peel Thunder in the WAFL for the remainder of the 2014 season, and played there until 2016.
