= Tom Bell (Australian footballer) =

Australian-rules footballer

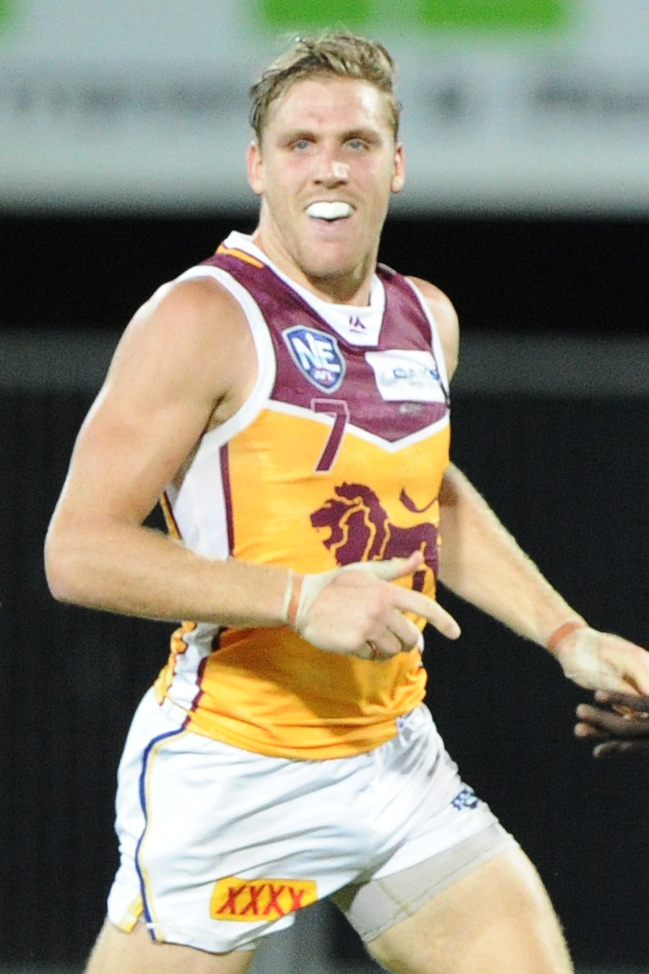
- Bell in April 2018

Personal information
- Full name: Thomas Bell
- Born: 13 June 1991 (age 35); Brisbane, Queensland
- Original team: Morningside (NEAFL)
- Draft: No. 14, 2012 AFL rookie draft
- Height: 187 cm (6 ft 2 in)
- Weight: 98 kg (216 lb)
- Position: Half-forward / Midfield

Playing career^{1}
Years	Club	Games (Goals)
2012–2015	Carlton	51 (36)
2016–2018	Brisbane Lions	21 (20)
Total		72 (56)
- ^{1} Playing statistics correct to the end of 2018.

Thomas Bell (born 13 June 1991) is a former professional Australian rules footballer who played for Carlton and Brisbane Lions in the Australian Football League (AFL).

== Early life ==
Born and raised in Brisbane, Bell played soccer as a youth before being introduced to Australian rules football at age 12. He attended Iona College in Brisbane throughout his schooling and graduated with future AFL players Tom Hickey and Josh Thomas in 2008. He joined the NEAFL's Morningside Australian Football Club in 2010, and was a regular senior player by 2011; in that season, he played twenty games for the club, and made his name as a wing/halfback player.

While playing in the NEAFL, Bell was selected in the Queensland Under-21 team, and also played a handful of games for the Brisbane Lions reserves. Outside of football, he undertook an apprenticeship as a refrigeration mechanic.

== AFL career ==
Following the 2011 season, and at the age of 20, Bell was recruited to the AFL as a rookie by the Carlton Football Club with its first round selection in the 2012 Rookie draft (pick No. 14 overall). He played most of his first season for Carlton's VFL-affiliate, the Northern Blues, and he made his senior debut for Carlton in Round 17. Bell played the last seven AFL matches of the season, and won Carlton's Best First-Year Player award for 2012.

In October 2015, Bell was traded to the Brisbane Lions. He was delisted by the Lions at the end of the 2018 season.
