= Dennis Armfield =

Australian rules footballer

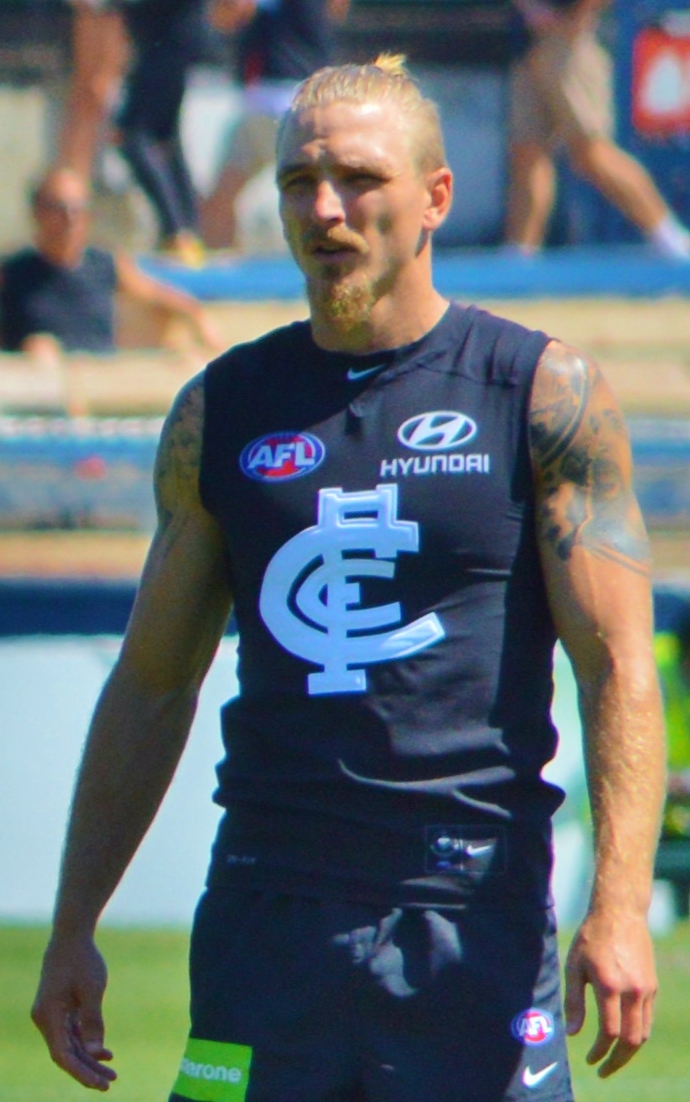
- Armfield with Carlton in 2017

Personal information
- Full name: Dennis Armfield
- Born: 22 December 1986 (age 39); Canberra, Australia
- Original team: Swan Districts (WAFL)
- Draft: No. 46, 2007 national draft
- Height: 181 cm (5 ft 11 in)
- Weight: 79 kg (174 lb)
- Position: Half-forward flank

Playing career^{1}
Years	Club	Games (Goals)
2008–2017	Carlton	145 (75)
- ^{1} Playing statistics correct to the end of 2017.

Career highlights
- Jim Stynes Community Leadership Award: 2015

Dennis Brett Armfield (born 22 December 1986) is a former professional Australian rules footballer who played for the Carlton Football Club in the Australian Football League (AFL).

After moving from Canberra to Perth as a child, Armfield spent all his junior years playing rugby union, where, among his duties, he was his team's designated place-kicker. After converting to Australian Rules Football at the age of 17, where he played for the local Kalamunda Football Club, before being recruited that year by Swan Districts Football Club in Western Australia in 2002, playing as a utility/midfielder. He worked his way through the Swan Districts junior ranks, and in 2006 was awarded the club's rookie of the year award, as well as being best on ground in the 2006 reserves grand final. He played all twenty games for the Swans' seniors in 2007.

Armfield was nominated for the 2007 national draft. He was noted for his fast pace and quick acceleration, and a strong tackling style remnant from his rugby union background. He was selected by the Carlton Football Club with a third-round selection (No. 46 overall) at the age of almost 21, which was rather old for a National Draft selection at the time. Armfield made his debut in round 10, 2008, against Geelong.

Armfield was primarily back pocket in his first four seasons with the club, playing 60 of a possible 92 games throughout that time, as either a midfielder/small forward, or in defensive roles against small forwards. He became a regular player in 2012, playing 21 out of 22 games, and added a strong counter-attacking game to his defensive abilities, kicking 16 goals for the season; he won the Best Clubman and Spirit of Carlton awards at the 2012 Best and Fairest awards night.

In 2015, Armfield was recognised for his work as an ambassador and weekly volunteer for Odyssey House Drug and Rehabilitation Centre as well as his regular contributions to the Carlton Football Club's community programs at the Royal Children's Hospital and Parkville Juvenile Justice Centre. For these efforts, he received the Jim Stynes Community Leadership Award and a $20,000 donation to the charity of his choice.

Armfield became a cult figure at the club, popular among fans, and was elevated to the club's leadership group in the 2017 season. Despite the position, a drop-off in form saw him play only five games for the season, and he retired from the AFL at the end of the year.

During his time at Carlton, Armfield studied podiatry, after previously studying physiotherapy.
