= Simon White (footballer) =

Australian rules footballer (born 1988)

Personal information
- Full name: Simon White
- Born: 17 June 1988 (age 38)
- Original team: Subiaco (WAFL)
- Draft: Pick 56, 2010 rookie draft
- Height: 190 cm (6 ft 3 in)
- Weight: 88 kg (194 lb)
- Position: Defender

Playing career^{1}
| Years | Club | Games (Goals) |
| 2010–2017 | Carlton | 87 (12) |
- ^{1} Playing statistics correct to the end of 2017.

Career highlights
- Subiaco Football Club Rising Star 2009

Simon Peter White (born 17 June 1988) is a former professional Australian rules footballer who played for the Carlton Football Club in the Australian Football League (AFL).

Originally from the Carine Junior Football Club, White joined the Subiaco Football Club in the WAFL. He made his senior debut there in 2009, playing 19 games, earning the club's Rising Star Award and playing in their Grand Final loss to South Fremantle.

White was recruited by the Carlton Football Club with its fourth round selection in the 2010 AFL rookie draft (No. 56 overall). At the age of 21, White was among the more experienced new rookies selected in the draft. He was quickly called up for his AFL debut, in round 4, 2010 against Adelaide. In his first four seasons, White played 26 matches for Carlton, with regular injures limiting his availability – he suffered a hip injury in 2010, knee and hamstring injuries in 2011, a medial ligament knee injury in 2012, the return from which was delayed by complications arising from the use of a synthetic ligament to augment the natural ligament (a LARS procedure), and a fractured C3 vertebra from an on-field collision in 2013. A clearer run without injuries saw White play 33 games over the following two years.

After only managing 11 games in the 2017 season, he was informed by Carlton that he would not be offered a new contract with the club.
