= Luke Mitchell (footballer) =

Australian rules footballer

Personal information
- Full name: Luke Mitchell
- Born: 28 February 1992 (age 34)
- Original team: Calder Cannons (TAC Cup)
- Draft: No. 42, 2010 National Draft, Carlton
- Height: 198 cm (6 ft 6 in)
- Weight: 94 kg (207 lb)

Playing career^{1}
Years	Club	Games (Goals)
2012	Carlton	1 (1)
- ^{1} Playing statistics correct to the end of 2013.

Luke Mitchell (born 28 February 1992) is an Australian rules footballer, formerly in the Australian Football League.

== Career ==
Mitchell plays primarily as a tall forward. Originally from Victoria, Mitchell attended and played school football for Melbourne Grammar School. Noted as a promising young talent from an early age, Mitchell represented Vic Metro at the 2008 AFL National Under 16 Championships. He played TAC Cup football for the Calder Cannons. After a strong 2009 season, there was some speculation that he could be taken by the fledgling Gold Coast Football Club as a seventeen-year-old recruit, but this did not eventuate. Mitchell then missed the majority of the 2010 TAC Cup season, as well as the 2010 AFL National Under 18 Championships, with a right shoulder injury sustained in the preseason, but he returned to play Calder's last eight games, including the grand final in which he kicked five goals.

Mitchell was recruited by the Carlton Football Club with its third round selection in the 2010 National Draft (No. 42 overall). He continued to be hindered by shoulder injuries during his first two years with Carlton: in the December of his first pre-season at Carlton, he re-injured his right shoulder; shortly after returning to training in March, he injured his left shoulder, with the resulting rehab causing him to play almost no football at any level during 2011; then, in January of the 2012 pre-season, he injured his right shoulder again, requiring another reconstruction. He finally made his senior VFL debut for Carlton's VFL-affiliate, the Northern Blues, midway through the 2012 season, and he played his sole AFL match for Carlton in the final round of the same season.

Mitchell was delisted at the end of the 2013 season. He will play for North Adelaide in the South Australian National Football League from 2014.
