= Andrew Carrazzo =

Australian rules footballer (born 1983)

Personal information
- Full name: Andrew Carrazzo
- Born: 15 December 1983 (age 42)
- Original team: Oakleigh Chargers (TAC Cup)
- Draft: No. 5, 2002 Rookie Draft, Geelong; No. 2, 2004 Rookie Draft, Carlton
- Height: 187 cm (6 ft 2 in)
- Weight: 85 kg (187 lb)
- Position: Midfielder

Playing career^{1}
Years	Club	Games (Goals)
2002-2003	Geelong	0 (0)
2004–2015	Carlton	194 (48)
- ^{1} Playing statistics correct to the end of 2015.

Career highlights
- John Nicholls Medal 2007; Carlton Best Clubman 2008

Andrew Carrazzo (born 15 December 1983) is a former professional Australian rules footballer who played for the Carlton Football Club in the Australian Football League (AFL).

== Junior career ==
Carrazzo played junior football with the St Simons Football Club in Rowville, the Knox Eagles Football Club (now Fentree Gully Eagles) in Ferntree Gully and East Burwood Rams. Carrazzo played with Oakleigh Chargers in the TAC Cup competition, finishing his final season runner up in the Morrish Medal for best player in the competition in 2001, as well as winning All-Australian honours in the national under-18 carnival.

== AFL career ==
Carrazzo was initially selected as a rookie by Geelong in 2002. He spent two seasons on the rookie list at Geelong, winning the Geelong VFL team's best and fairest award in 2003, but never breaking into the Geelong senior list. He was again rookie listed in 2004, this time by Carlton. After another strong season in the VFL, he was elevated to the senior list, making his debut for Carlton in Round 21, 2004 against Melbourne. He was the last Carlton player to make his AFL debut at the club's traditional home ground at Princes Park.

From the start of the 2005 season until the end of his career eleven years later, Carrazzo was a regular in the Carlton team, as he became an integral part of the Carlton midfield. Depending on the needs of the team, Carrazzo was able to play as a high-possession ball-winning midfielder, or as a strong tagger. He had a break-out season in 2007, playing as the main ball-winner in a midfield which lacked experience following a season-ending injury to established follower Nick Stevens, and he won the 2007 John Nicholls Medal as Carlton's best and fairest, beating Heath Scotland by 6 votes for the award. Carrazzo received 11 votes at the 2007 Brownlow Medal.

In Round 7, 2008 against the West Coast Eagles at Subiaco, Carrazzo picked up an AFL career high 42 disposals. With the recruitment of Chris Judd and the return of Nick Stevens from injury, Carrazzo was moved out of the midfield, and spent most of the season playing as a rebounding defender. Carrazzo played the first 21 games of the season, before injury forced him out in Round 22 after 54 consecutive games.

Carrazzo fractured his forearm during an intraclub practice match in the 2009 preseason, missing the first four games of the AFL season. He played two games with the Northern Bullants to regain match fitness, and in the second amassed 55 disposals against Box Hill, before being returned to the AFL seniors for Round 5. A further injury to his thumb kept him sidelined for another four weeks, before returning to play all remaining games, including Carlton's elimination final loss to the Brisbane Lions. Carrazzo played primarily a primarily defensive midfield roles in 2009, as well as playing on medium-sized opposition half-back flankers.

Carrazzo played his 100th AFL game for Carlton in Round 1 of the 2010 season against Richmond, and was named acting captain for the first time in that game in the absence of Chris Judd, and served as a vice-captain for the next few years. He played all twenty-three games in 2010, and finished fifth in the club Best and Fairest. He was awarded life membership of the Carlton Football Club in December 2011.

By the early 2012 season, Carrazzo was rated by sportswriters as one of the best taggers in the game, able to shut down some of the game's best midfielders and win plenty of the ball himself in the same game. He attracted particular praise for a two-way shutdown role against Collingwood's Scott Pendlebury in Round 3, 2012; but the following week his shoulder blade was broken in a strong driving tackle from behind by Essendon's Sam Lonergan, and he missed the next two months. Although the tackle did not attract sanction from the tribunal, Lonergan received death threats via Twitter in relation to the incident.

Carrazzo was limited to 39 of a possible 67 games in the final three years of his career, suffering from recurring calf injuries during that time, but he remained a consistent attacking tagger during that time. He retired at the end of the 2015 season after 194 games in twelve seasons at Carlton. He briefly pursued a career in umpiring through the AFL's player pathway program, umpiring at a suburban level in early 2016, but retired from that in June 2016 after continued trouble from his calf injuries.

== Statistics ==
Legend
G	Goals	K	Kicks	D	Disposals	T	Tackles
B	Behinds	H	Handballs	M	Marks

Season	Team	No.	Games	Totals							Averages (per game)							Votes
Season	Team	No.	Games	G	B	K	H	D	M	T	G	B	K	H	D	M	T	Votes
2004	Carlton	44	2	0	0	21	15	36	9	4	0.0	0.0	10.5	7.5	18.0	4.5	2.0	0
2005	Carlton	44	20	4	4	196	118	314	83	41	0.2	0.2	9.8	5.9	15.7	4.2	2.1	2
2006	Carlton	44	19	4	6	209	170	379	123	38	0.2	0.3	11.0	8.9	19.9	6.5	2.0	0
2007	Carlton	44	22	8	6	287	282	569	114	101	0.4	0.3	13.0	12.8	25.9	5.2	4.6	11
2008	Carlton	44	21	4	3	282	255	537	133	65	0.2	0.1	13.4	12.1	25.6	6.3	3.1	1
2009	Carlton	44	15	12	8	180	174	354	58	47	0.8	0.5	12.0	11.6	23.6	3.9	3.1	0
2010	Carlton	44	23	4	8	254	266	520	100	77	0.2	0.3	11.0	11.6	22.6	4.3	3.3	2
2011	Carlton	44	18	5	3	205	219	424	75	95	0.3	0.2	11.4	12.2	23.6	4.2	5.3	0
2012	Carlton	44	14	5	1	155	190	345	53	66	0.4	0.1	11.1	13.6	24.6	3.8	4.7	2
2013	Carlton	44	10	1	1	84	96	180	25	30	0.1	0.1	8.4	9.6	18.0	2.5	3.0	0
2014	Carlton	44	14	0	1	119	162	281	40	86	0.0	0.1	8.5	11.6	20.1	2.9	6.1	1
2015	Carlton	44	16	1	3	128	237	365	40	63	0.1	0.2	8.0	14.8	22.8	2.5	3.9	1
Career			194	48	44	2120	2184	4304	853	713	0.2	0.2	10.9	11.3	22.2	4.4	3.7	20

== Personal life ==
Carrazzo is of Italian descent. He attended Mazenod College and De La Salle College. He has been a lifelong Carlton supporter.

Carrazzo is married to Yvette Wood, after proposing in 2008. In January 2012, the couple welcomed triplets Grace, Charlotte and Sophia.

Carrazzo is often referred to, particularly amongst fans, by the nickname "Carrots", a deliberate mispronunciation of "Carrazz-".
