= Chris Yarran =

Australian rules footballer

Personal information
- Full name: Christopher Yarran
- Born: 19 December 1990 (age 35); Western Australia
- Original team: Swan Districts (WAFL)
- Draft: No. 6, 2008 national draft
- Height: 180 cm (5 ft 11 in)
- Weight: 84 kg (185 lb)
- Position: Half-back

Playing career^{1}
Years	Club	Games (Goals)
2009–2015	Carlton	119 (90)
2016	Richmond	0 (0)
Total		119 (90)
- ^{1} Playing statistics correct to the end of 2015.

Career highlights
- AFL Goal of the Year: 2012; 2010 AFL Rising Star nominee

Christopher Yarran (born 19 December 1990) is a former professional Australian rules footballer who played for the Carlton Football Club in the Australian Football League (AFL). He was also listed with the Richmond Football Club but did not play a senior match.

== Early life ==
Yarran is an Indigenous Australian footballer who played his junior years in Western Australia. He was primarily a small forward in his junior days, but occasionally spent time in the midfield and defence. At 17 years old, Yarran gained selection into the Swan Districts senior team, where he played thirteen games and kicked thirty-nine goals, including seven on debut and eight in three finals matches. He played with Western Australia in the under 18s championships and kicked eight goals in four games. He was selected to join the Australian Institute of Sport-AFL academy in the 2006/07 intake and captained a team from the Clontarf Football Academy in a game against a visiting South African under 19s side in February 2007.

Yarran is the cousin of former Fremantle player Shane Yarran.

== AFL career ==
=== Draft ===
Yarran was a noted talent and was expected to be drafted high, with some considering him to be one of the most talented players available in the draft. He would ultimately be selected by the Carlton Football Club with its first-round selection (sixth overall) in the 2008 national draft. At draft time, Carlton coach Brett Ratten said that Yarran could assist fellow small forward Eddie Betts and help to reduce the defensive pressure on then full-forward Brendan Fevola.

=== Carlton (2009–2015) ===
Yarran played his first senior game for Carlton in round 7, 2009, against Fremantle. He played sporadically for Carlton during the season, managing six games, but played most of his games with Carlton's Victorian Football League (VFL) affiliate team, the Northern Bullants, including a five-goal performance in the VFL preliminary final. In 2010, Yarran played 16 games for Carlton, and earned an AFL Rising Star nomination. Throughout that season, Yarran formed part of a short-lived forward-line structure consisting of tall full-forward Setanta Ó hAilpín and three small forwards (Betts, Yarran, and Yarran's Swan Districts teammate Jeff Garlett) who became known as "Setanta's Little Helpers".

In 2011, coach Brett Ratten abandoned the tactic of playing three small forwards in favour of two: Betts and Garlett. Yarran was moved onto the half-back line and within a year became a damaging rebounding defender, able to use his speed, agility and accurate disposal to set up much of Carlton's rebound play. Yarran played 23 games for the season and finished tenth in the John Nicholls Medal. His output in the 2012 season was interrupted by a turf toe injury, but he won the Goal of the Year award for a goal in round 1 in which he gathered a loose ball on the half-forward flank, evaded three Richmond opponents and skirted the boundary line before goaling from 50 metres.

=== Richmond ===
In October 2015, Yarran was traded to Richmond in exchange for a first-round draft selection. He failed to play a match for the club in 2016, however, after dealing with mental-health issues. Yarran subsequently made a return to training, participating in the club's first day of pre-season training ahead of the 2017 season. He was released from his contract the next day after a mutual decision that he was unable to meet the demands of league football as a result of ongoing mental-health issues.

== Other work ==
Yarran featured in the award-winning 2010 documentary film, Three Boys Dreaming, which followed the lives of him and two other young Indigenous Australian footballers over a four-year period from ages 14 to 18.

== Personal life ==
In May 2019, Yarran was sentenced to five years in jail after stealing cars, attacking police and members of the public while under the influence of methamphetamine. He was released on parole in April 2022.
