= Marcus Davies =

Australian Rules Footballer

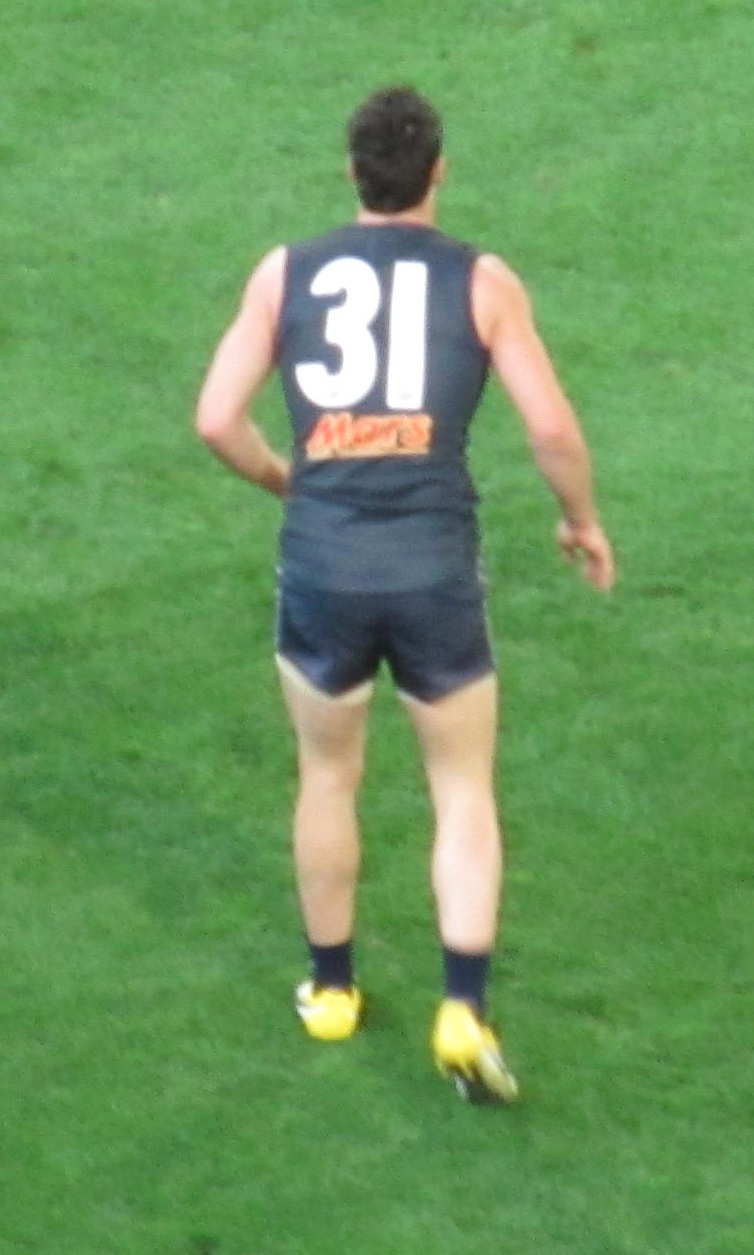
- Davies in September 2011

Personal information
- Full name: Marcus Davies
- Nickname: MD
- Born: 6 April 1991 (age 35)
- Original teams: Tassie Mariners (TAC Cup), North Hobart Football Club (TSL)
- Draft: No. 43, 2009 National draft, Carlton
- Height: 188 cm (6 ft 2 in)
- Weight: 190 kg (419 lb)
- Position: Midfielder / Defender

Club information
- Current club: Tigers FC (Kingborough)(TSL)
- Number: 9

Playing career^{1}
Years	Club	Games (Goals)
2010–2013	Carlton	17 (1)
- ^{1} Playing statistics correct to the end of 2013.

Marcus Davies is an Australian rules footballer who played with the Carlton Football Club in the (AFL)

Davies played his junior football with the Sandy Bay Lions Junior Football Club in Hobart, Tasmania, attending The Hutchins School. Upon turning eighteen in 2009, he broke into the North Hobart Football Club senior team in the (TSL); he played eleven senior games during the season, and by the end he was regularly amongst his team's best. He represented Tasmania at the 2009 AFL Under 18 Championships, and was noted for his endurance at the Draft Camp. He was selected by the Carlton Football Club in the 2009 AFL National draft with its third round selection (#43 overall). Davies has played both midfield and defence during his junior career.

Davies made his senior Carlton debut in Round 19, 2010 against Essendon. In his first two seasons with the club, Davies played 13 games for Carlton, and spent the rest of the time with Carlton's VFL-affiliate, the Northern Blues Football Club. He played only four games in the next two years, was delisted at the conclusion of the 2013 season.

After one season with Port Melbourne Football Club in the (VFL) in 2014, Davies joined the Tigers FC (Kingborough) in the Tasmanian State League starting in 2015, taking on a playing assistant coach role which he still holds as of 2021; he also took on the administrative role of operations manager at the club from 2020.

Davies is currently captain and assistant coach of Hutchins Old Boys Football Club, where he won the premiership in 2022.
