= 2010 Carlton Football Club season =

Carlton Football Club
2010 season
- President: Stephen Kernahan
- Coach: Brett Ratten
- Captain: Chris Judd
- Home grounds: Etihad Stadium (Training and administrative: Visy Park)
- AFL season: 8th (11–11)
- Finals series: 8th
- Best and Fairest: Chris Judd
- Leading goalkicker: Eddie Betts (42)
- Club membership: 40,480

The 2010 Carlton Football Club season was the Carlton Football Club's 147th season of competition, and 114th as a member of the Australian Football League.

Carlton finished 8th out of 16 teams in the 2010 AFL season, and reached the finals for the second consecutive season. Captain Chris Judd won the Brownlow Medal as fairest and best player in the league.

== Club summary ==
The 2010 AFL season was the 114th season of the VFL/AFL competition since its inception in 1897; and, having competed in every season, it was also the 114th season contested by the Carlton Football Club.

Former club champion Stephen Kernahan continued as club president in the 2010 season, a position he had held since August 2008. The club's joint major sponsors were car manufacturer Hyundai, which had been with the club since 2008, and confectionery company Mars, newly signed for the 2010 season. As in previous years, the club's primary home ground was Etihad Stadium, with home games expecting to draw larger crowds played at the M.C.G., and with traditional home ground Visy Park serving as the training and administrative base. As had been the case every year since 2003, Carlton had a full alignment with the Northern Bullants in the Victorian Football League, allowing Carlton-listed players to play with the Bullants when not selected in AFL matches.

Carlton sold a total of 40,480 memberships for the 2010 season, down 4.6% from the club's record-high 2009 membership of 42,408. The club had the fifth-highest membership in the league, and the second-highest of clubs who play home games only in Victoria, behind only Collingwood.^{Note 1,} The club's membership campaign slogan for 2010 was "Can you smell what the Blues are cooking", borrowed from the catchphrase used by WWE wrestler Dwayne "The Rock" Johnson.

Brett Ratten and Chris Judd continued in their respective roles as senior coach and captain of the club, each entering his third season appointed to the job.^{Note 2} Kade Simpson continued in the role of vice-captain, and the club's leadership group also comprised Michael Jamison, Andrew Carrazzo, Heath Scotland and Simon Wiggins.

== Squad and player statistics for 2010 ==
Flags represent the state of origin, i.e. the state in which the player played his Under-18s football.

Senior List
No.	State	Player	Age	AFL Debut	Recruited from	Career (to end 2009)		2010 Player Statistics
No.	State	Player	Age	AFL Debut	Recruited from	Gms	Gls	Gms	Gls	B	D	K	HB	M	T	HO
1	(Victoria (state))	Andrew Walker	23	2004	Bendigo (U18)	87	32	16	5	4	334	203	131	97	22	–
2	(South Australia)	Jordan Russell	23	2005	West Adelaide	70	15	23	1	1	463	277	186	137	71	–
3	(Victoria (state))	Marc Murphy	22	2006	Oakleigh (U18)	80	63	22	19	11	560	278	282	90	100	–
4	(South Australia)	Bryce Gibbs	20	2007	Glenelg	66	34	23	6	11	560	342	218	127	82	3
5	(Victoria (state))	Chris Judd (c)	26	2002	Sandringham (U18), West Coast	178	165	20	14	11	539	291	248	61	105	–
6	(Victoria (state))	Kade Simpson (vc)	25	2003	Eastern (U18)	110	62	23	17	19	538	328	210	142	93	4
7	(Victoria (state))	Brock McLean	23	2004	Calder (U18), Melbourne	94	39	6	2	2	107	41	66	20	31	–
8	(Victoria (state))	Matthew Kreuzer	20	2008	Northern (U18)	43	26	13	5	4	159	65	94	29	62	239
9	(Western Australia)	Chris Johnson	23	2005	East Fremantle, Melbourne	41	3	5	1	1	78	54	24	28	15	–
10	(Western Australia)	Richard Hadley	26	2001	East Fremantle, Brisbane Lions	58	15	8	1	1	138	50	88	23	36	1
11	(Victoria (state))	Robert Warnock	22	2007	Sandringham (U18), Fremantle	21	4	12	4	1	124	50	74	24	27	218
12	(Tasmania)	Mitch Robinson	20	2009	Tasmania (U18/VFL)	10	5	16	14	4	242	133	109	51	67	1
13	(Western Australia)	Chris Yarran	19	2009	Swan Districts	6	4	16	19	11	187	121	66	56	53	1
14	(Victoria (state))	Brad Fisher	25	2003	Eastern Ranges	98	126	1	1	–	6	6	–	4	3	–
15	(Western Australia)	Steven Browne	20	2008	West Perth	20	5	3	1	1	35	14	21	12	9	–
16	(Victoria (state))	Shaun Grigg	21	2007	North Ballarat (U18)	35	7	8	3	2	172	82	90	42	25	7
17	(Republic of Ireland)	Setanta Ó hAilpín	26	2005	Cork GAA	58	30	14	26	15	144	97	47	47	18	2
18	(Western Australia)	Paul Bower	21	2006	Peel	45	2	12	1	–	202	79	123	58	25	–
19	(Victoria (state))	Eddie Betts	23	2005	Calder (U18)	97	123	23	42	29	318	178	140	91	76	–
20	(South Australia)	Rhys O'Keeffe	19	–	North Adelaide	–	–	–	–	–	–	–	–	–	–	–
21	(South Australia)	Mark Austin	20	2007	Glenelg	14	1	–	–	–	–	–	–	–	–	–
22	(Queensland)	Shaun Hampson	21	2007	Mount Gravatt	27	5	8	6	8	57	28	29	22	19	104
23	(Victoria (state))	Lachlan Henderson	20	2007	Geelong (U18), Brisbane	15	3	19	25	11	211	130	81	100	38	–
24	(Western Australia)	Kane Lucas	18	–	East Fremantle	—	—	8	–	–	115	53	62	37	13	1
26	(Northern Territory)	Joe Anderson	21	2007	Darwin	12	–	5	–	–	67	34	33	23	24	–
27	(Western Australia)	Dennis Armfield	23	2008	Swan Districts	26	2	19	–	1	274	129	145	53	50	–
29	(Victoria (state))	Heath Scotland (lg)	29	1999	Western (U18), Collingwood	176	57	23	10	10	560	288	272	132	69	1
30	(Victoria (state))	Jarrad Waite	26	2003	Murray (U18)	115	117	16	36	14	239	173	66	111	56	2
31	(Tasmania)	Marcus Davies	18	–	North Hobart	–	–	5	–	1	43	27	16	10	14	–
32	(Victoria (state))	Bret Thornton	26	2002	Oakleigh (U18)	149	4	12	4	–	192	122	70	79	19	3
33	(Victoria (state))	Ryan Houlihan	27	2000	Murray (U18)	182	112	13	15	4	239	129	110	55	31	–
34	(Tasmania)	Simon Wiggins (lg)	27	2001	Glenorchy	116	36	–	–	–	–	–	–	–	–	–
35	(Victoria (state))	Caleb Tiller	18	–	Murray (U18)	–	–	–	–	–	–	–	–	–	–	–
36	(Victoria (state))	Rohan Kerr	18	–	Dandenong (U18)	–	–	–	–	–	–	–	–	–	–	–
39	(South Australia)	Sam Jacobs	21	2009	Woodville-West Torrens	4	1	13	2	2	148	53	95	38	53	286
40	(Victoria (state))	Michael Jamison (lg)	23	2007	North Ballarat (U18, VFL)	34	0	23	–	–	200	136	64	89	48	–
44	(Victoria (state))	Andrew Carrazzo (lg)	26	2004	Oakleigh (U18), Geelong	99	32	23	4	8	520	254	266	100	77	–
45	(Tasmania)	Aaron Joseph	20	2009	Tasmania (U18)	23	3	22	2	1	258	124	134	66	69	–
Rookie List
No.	State	Player	Age	AFL Debut	Recruited from	Career (to end 2009)		2010 Player Statistics
No.	State	Player	Age	AFL Debut	Recruited from	Gms	Gls	Gms	Gls	B	D	K	HB	M	T	HO
28	(Victoria (state))	Jaryd Cachia	18	–	Northern (U18)	–	–	–	–	–	–	–	–	–	–	–
37	(Victoria (state))	Joseph Dare	18	–	Geelong (U18)	–	–	–	–	–	–	–	–	–	–	–
38	(Western Australia)	Jeff Garlett	20	2009	Swan Districts	10	12	20	39	21	245	170	75	75	73	–
41	(Victoria (state))	Levi Casboult	19	–	Dandenong (U18)	–	–	–	–	–	–	–	–	–	–	–
42	(Republic of Ireland)	Zach Tuohy	20	–	Laois GAA	–	–	–	–	–	–	–	–	–	–	–
43	(Western Australia)	Simon White	21	2010	Subiaco	–	–	6	1	–	92	54	38	45	8	–
46	(Western Australia)	David Ellard	20	2008	Swan Districts	1	1	7	2	4	92	52	40	17	51	–
47	(Western Australia)	Joshua Donaldson	18	–	West Perth	–	–	–	–	–	–	–	–	–	–	–
For players: (c) denotes captain, (vc) denotes vice-captain, (lg) denotes leadership group. Players' ages are given for 1 January 2010. Statistics for AFL matches: Gms – Games played, Gls – Goals, B – Behinds, D – Disposals, K – Kicks, HB – Handballs, M – Marks, T – Tackles, HO – Hitouts. Source for statistics: AFL Tables.

== Playing list changes ==
The following summarises all player changes between the conclusion of the 2009 season and the conclusion of the 2010 season.

=== The Fevola trade ===
The most significant change to the list was the trading of full forward Brendan Fevola to the Brisbane Lions. Carlton announced its intentions to trade Fevola after his drunken behaviour at the 2009 Brownlow Medal Count, which served as the last straw in a long rap sheet of off-field indiscretions while at the club.

The Brisbane Lions emerged as the likely destination. Brisbane initially offered 31-year-old full forward Daniel Bradshaw and 23-year-old midfielder Michael Rischitelli in the trade. Both players were flown to Melbourne to tour Carlton's facilities during trade week, but Rischitelli was not willing to relocate. On the final day of trade week, Brisbane agreed to give Carlton a first round draft pick and 19-year-old key position prospect Lachlan Henderson (who was himself a first round draft pick, taken at No. 8 in the 2007 National Draft), in exchange for Fevola, a second-round draft pick, and for Carlton to pay $100,000 of Fevola's salary for each of the two years remaining on his existing contract. Fevola left the club as its third-highest career goalkicker, with 575 goals.

Although considered reasonable at the time, the trade is now widely viewed as a disaster for the Brisbane Lions, because all players involved in the trade negotiations had left the club within eighteen months. Shortly after trade, Bradshaw walked out on the Lions, and was recruited to the Sydney Swans in the pre-season draft – either because his feelings were hurt by being offered to trade, or because Fevola's recruitment would have limited Bradshaw's own opportunities in the Lions' forward-line. Rischitelli left the club at the end of 2010, after signing a contract with the fledgling Gold Coast Football Club; some in the media speculated that he was also disgruntled about being offered in the Fevola trade, but Rischitelli has never said anything to this effect. Finally, prior to the 2011 season, Brisbane sacked Fevola after further off-field incidents during the 2010/11 offseason. For its part, Carlton gained only a moderate benefit from the trade, with Henderson and No. 12 draft pick Kane Lucas giving the club six and five years service respectively, with only one top-ten finish in the club's best and fairest award between them: a third-place finish by Henderson in 2013.

=== In ===
Player	Previous club	League	via
(Victoria (state)) Brock McLean	Melbourne	AFL	AFL Trade Week, in exchange for pick No. 11
(Victoria (state)) Lachlan Henderson	Geelong	AFL	AFL Trade Week, with pick No. 12, in exchange for Brendan Fevola and pick No. 27
(Western Australia) Kane Lucas	East Fremantle	WAFL	AFL National Draft, first round (pick No. 12)
(Tasmania) Marcus Davies	North Hobart	TFL	AFL National Draft, third round (pick No. 43)
(Victoria (state)) Rohan Kerr	Dandenong	TAC Cup	AFL National Draft, fourth round (pick No. 59)
(Victoria (state)) Jaryd Cachia	Northern Knights	TAC Cup	AFL Rookie Draft, first round (pick No. 15)
(Victoria (state)) Joseph Dare	Geelong Falcons	TAC Cup	AFL Rookie Draft, second round (pick No. 31)
(Victoria (state)) Levi Casboult	Dandenong Stingrays	TAC Cup	AFL Rookie Draft, third round (pick No. 44)
(Western Australia) Simon White	Subiaco	WAFL	AFL Rookie Draft, fourth round (pick No. 56)
(Western Australia) Josh Donaldson	West Perth	WAFL	AFL Rookie Draft, fifth round (pick No. 66)
(Republic of Ireland) Zach Tuohy	Laois GAA	GAA	Recruited on an international rookie contact during AFL Rookie Draft, sixth round (pick No. 73)

=== Out ===
Player	New Club	League	via
(Victoria (state)) Nick Stevens	–	–	Retired
(Victoria (state)) Brendan Fevola	Brisbane Lions	AFL	AFL Trade Week with pick No. 27, in exchange for Lachlan Henderson and pick No. 12
(Victoria (state)) Jordan Bannister	–	–	Delisted; retired from playing to pursue umpiring under the AFL's Player Pathway Program.
(South Australia) Adam Hartlett	West Adelaide	SANFL	Delisted
(Victoria (state)) Jake Edwards	Darley	Ballarat FL	Delisted
(Victoria (state)) Adam Bentick	Port Melbourne	VFL	Delisted
(Victoria (state)) Cameron Cloke	Port Adelaide	AFL	Delisted
(Victoria (state)) Lachie Hill	Old Scotch	VAFA	Delisted from the rookie list
(South Australia) Darren Pfeiffer	Southport	QAFL	Delisted from the rookie list
(Victoria (state)) Luke Stanton	Montmorency	NFL	Delisted from the rookie list
(Victoria (state)) Greg Bentley	Rosebud	MPNFL	Delisted from the rookie list

=== List management ===
Player	Change
(South Australia) Sam Jacobs	Promoted from the rookie list to the senior list during AFL National Draft, fifth round (pick No. 72)
(Tasmania) Aaron Joseph	Promoted from the rookie list to the senior list during AFL National Draft, sixth round (pick No. 83)

== Season summary ==
=== Pre-season matches ===
==== NAB Cup ====
**Round**	**Date and local time**	**Opponent**	**Scores** (Carlton's scores indicated in **bold**)			**Venue**	**Attendance**
**Round**	**Date and local time**	**Opponent**	Home	Away	Result	**Venue**	**Attendance**
1	Saturday, 20 February (7:40 pm)	Sydney	2.7.11 (71)	**0.8.11 (59)**	Lost by 12 points Report	Blacktown Olympic Park (A)	9,732

==== NAB Challenge ====
**Week**	**Date and local time**	**Opponent**	**Scores** (Carlton's scores indicated in **bold**)			**Venue**	**Attendance**
**Week**	**Date and local time**	**Opponent**	Home	Away	Result	**Venue**	**Attendance**
1	Friday, 26 February (4:00 pm)	Brisbane Lions	**14.9 (93)**	12.8 (80)	Won by 13 points Report	Visy Park (H)	10,000 (approx.)
2	Saturday, 6 March (10:30 am)	West Coast	16.9 (105)	**9.12 (66)**	Lost by 39 points	Leederville Oval (A)	Unknown
3	Friday, 12 March (4:00 pm)	Adelaide	**11.16 (82)**	12.11 (83)	Lost by 1 point Report	Visy Park (H)	3,000 (approx.)

=== Regular season ===
Despite winning thirteen games in 2009 and finishing in the finals for the first time since 2001, Carlton was considered unlikely to make the finals again in 2010, as pundits believed the club's forward-line would not be able to cover the loss of Brendan Fevola. True to those expectations, Carlton's performance in 2010 was slightly worse than that of 2009, finishing with an even 11–11 record; but that was good enough to finish eighth and in the finals for the second consecutive season, finishing ahead of ninth-placed North Melbourne by a considerable margin of percentage. The club's results were generally consistent with its finishing position, with a record of only 2–8 in ten matches against other top eight teams, and a record of 9–3 in twelve matches against the bottom eight teams.

**Round**	**Date and local time**	**Opponent**	**Scores** (Carlton's scores indicated in **bold**)			**Venue**	**Attendance**	**Ladder** **position**
**Round**	**Date and local time**	**Opponent**	Home	Away	Result	**Venue**	**Attendance**	**Ladder** **position**
1	Thursday, 25 March (7:10 pm)	Richmond	9.10 (64)	**18.12 (120)**	Won by 56 points Report	M.C.G. (A)	72,010	3rd
2	Thursday, 1 April (7:40 pm)	Brisbane Lions	16.11 (107)	**12.16 (88)**	Lost by 19 points Report	The Gabba (A)	36,780	8th
3	Saturday, 10 April (7:10 pm)	Essendon	**10.15 (75)**	13.17 (95)	Lost by 20 points Report	M.C.G. (H)	71,006	10th
4	Saturday, 17 April (2:40 pm)	Adelaide	6.19 (55)	**16.7 (103)**	Won by 48 points Report	AAMI Stadium (A)	38,321	7th
5	Monday, 26 April (2:10 pm)	Geelong	**15.14 (104)**	9.14 (68)	Won by 36 points Report	M.C.G. (H)	71,399	6th
6	Sunday, 2 May (2:10 pm)	Collingwood	**16.6 (102)**	24.11 (155)	Lost by 53 points Report	M.C.G. (H)	80,645	9th
7	Monday, 10 May (7:20 pm)	St Kilda	9.14 (68)	**20.9 (129)**	Won by 61 points Report	Etihad Stadium (A)	42,866	7th
8	Sunday, 16 May (3:10 pm)	Port Adelaide	14.8 (92)	**17.16 (118)**	Won by 26 points Report	AAMI Stadium (A)	30,228	5th
9	Sunday, 23 May (2:10 pm)	Hawthorn	**8.12 (60)**	16.14 (110)	Lost by 50 points Report	Etihad Stadium (H)	47,484	6th
10	Sunday, 30 May (2:10 pm)	West Coast	**15.15 (105)**	11.10 (76)	Won by 29 points Report	Etihad Stadium (H)	29,175	6th
11	Saturday, 5 June (2:10 pm)	Melbourne	**15.11 (101)**	9.6 (60)	Won by 41 points Report	M.C.G. (H)	49,745	5th
12	Friday, 11 June (7:40 pm)	North Melbourne	14.13 (97)	**10.8 (68)**	Lost by 29 points Report	Etihad Stadium (A)	43,732	6th
13	Saturday, 19 June (7:10 pm)	Fremantle	**12.15 (87)**	14.12 (96)	Lost by 9 points Report	Etihad Stadium (H)	28,869	6th
14	Thursday, 1 July (7:10 pm)	Brisbane Lions	**18.12 (120)**	9.11 (65)	Won by 55 points Report	Etihad Stadium (H)	35,623	6th
15	Sunday, 11 July (4:40 pm)	Western Bulldogs	**8.10 (58)**	20.6 (126)	Lost by 68 points Report	Etihad Stadium (H)	37,517	7th
16	Sunday, 18 July (1:10 pm)	Sydney	**10.8 (68)**	16.11 (107)	Lost by 39 points Report	Etihad Stadium (H)	31,915	8th
17	Saturday, 24 July (5:40 pm)	West Coast	11.17 (83)	**15.19 (109)**	Won by 26 points Report	Subiaco Oval (A)	35,925	7th
18	Saturday, 31 July (2:10 pm)	Collingwood	15.15 (105)	**9.3 (57)**	Lost by 48 points Report	M.C.G. (A)	76,980	7th
19	Friday, 6 August (7:40 pm)	Essendon	9.19 (73)	**23.11 (149)**	Won by 76 points Report	M.C.G. (A)	57,095	6th
20	Saturday, 14 August (2:10 pm)	Richmond	**23.18 (156)**	10.7 (67)	Won by 89 points Report	M.C.G. (H)	44,716	6th
21	Friday, 20 August (7:40 pm)	Geelong	18.13 (121)	**12.7 (79)**	Lost by 42 points Report	Etihad Stadium (A)	45,172	8th
22	Friday, 27 August (6:40 pm)	Fremantle	13.15 (93)	**13.9 (87)**	Lost by 6 points Report	Subiaco Oval (A)	39,376	8th

=== Finals ===
**Week**	**Date and local time**	**Opponent**	**Scores** (Carlton's scores indicated in **bold**)			**Venue**	**Attendance**
**Week**	**Date and local time**	**Opponent**	Home	Away	Result	**Venue**	**Attendance**
First Elimination Final	Sunday, 5 September (2:40 pm)	Sydney	14.15 (99)	**13.16 (94)**	Lost by 5 points Report	ANZ Stadium (A)	41,596

== Ladder ==
2010 AFL ladder
Pos	Team	Pld	W	L	D	PF	PA	PP	Pts	
1	Collingwood (P)	22	17	4	1	2349	1658	141.7	70	Finals series
2	Geelong	22	17	5	0	2518	1702	147.9	68	Finals series
3	St Kilda	22	15	6	1	1935	1591	121.6	62	Finals series
4	Western Bulldogs	22	14	8	0	2174	1734	125.4	56	Finals series
5	Sydney	22	13	9	0	2017	1863	108.3	52	Finals series
6	Fremantle	22	13	9	0	2168	2087	103.9	52	Finals series
7	Hawthorn	22	12	9	1	2044	1847	110.7	50	Finals series
8	Carlton	22	11	11	0	2143	1983	108.1	44	Finals series
9	North Melbourne	22	11	11	0	1930	2208	87.4	44	
10	Port Adelaide	22	10	12	0	1749	2123	82.4	40	
11	Adelaide	22	9	13	0	1763	1870	94.3	36	
12	Melbourne	22	8	13	1	1863	1971	94.5	34	
13	Brisbane Lions	22	7	15	0	1775	2158	82.3	28	
14	Essendon	22	7	15	0	1930	2402	80.3	28	
15	Richmond	22	6	16	0	1714	2348	73.0	24	
16	West Coast	22	4	18	0	1773	2300	77.1	16	

Source: AFL ladder
Rules for classification: 1) points; 2) percentage; 3) number of points for.
(P) Premiers

== Leading goalkickers ==
Eddie Betts was Carlton's leading goalkicker for 2010. It was the first time Betts had won the club goalkicking, and his tally of 42 goals was a new season high for Betts. The win ended a streak of seven consecutive years in which the club goalkicking was won by Brendan Fevola, who was traded at the start of the season.

Player	Goals	Behinds
Eddie Betts	42	29
Jeff Garlett	39	21
Jarrad Waite	36	17
Setanta Ó hAilpín	22	13
Lachlan Henderson	25	11
Marc Murphy	19	11
Chris Yarran	19	11
Kade Simpson	17	19
Ryan Houlihan	15	4
Chris Judd	14	11

== Team awards and records ==
Game records

- Round 4 – Carlton defeated Adelaide by 48 points, despite having two fewer scoring shots. It was the equal-largest victory by the team with fewer scoring shots since Round 10, 1992.
- Round 7 – Carlton defeated St Kilda for the first time since 2001, ending a twelve-game losing streak against that opponent. The losing streak, along with a concurrent twelve-game losing streak against Sydney which was ended in 2009, was the club's equal-longest losing streak against a single opponent since 1902.
- Round 19 – Carlton scored 10.3 (63) in the final quarter against Essendon. It was Carlton's highest-scoring quarter, and first ten-goal quarter, since Round 18, 2000.

Season records

- Carlton conceded 1983 points in the home and away season, its fewest since 2001.

== Notable events ==
Pre-Christmas booze cruise

The playing group generated significant controversy at a booze cruise during the 2009/10 offseason. The event was held in late December 2008, at the start of the Christmas break, and involved widespread binge drinking amongst the group. Three players were then involved in alcohol-related incidents after the cruise docked: Andrew Walker and Ryan Houlihan both brawled with security at Crown Casino, and Eddie Betts was arrested for being drunk in a public place; all three were fined by the club, and the entire playing group was censured for its behaviour. The club was also issued a 'please explain' by the league, which was concerned about the effect the incident would have on the image of the game in the community.

Round 12 – 25th anniversary of Friday night football

In Round 12, North Melbourne hosted Carlton on Friday night in a match which celebrated the 25th anniversary of Friday Night Football, which North Melbourne had originally pioneered in 1985. After this year, North Melbourne requested that it host Carlton in a Friday night match each year – a match of annual significance for North Melbourne, because at the time it was a low-drawing team, and was otherwise seldom scheduled in the prime Friday night timeslot.

== Individual awards and records ==
=== John Nicholls Medal ===
The Carlton Football Club Best and Fairest awards night took place on 4 October. The John Nicholls Medal, for the best and fairest player of the club, as well as several other awards, were presented on the night.

John Nicholls Medal

The voting system for the John Nicholls Medal remained the same as in 2009. In each match, the five members of the Match Committee awarded votes. Each committee member could award votes to up to eight players, and each player could receive up to ten votes from each judge. A "perfect score" for a round is 50 votes. The player with the most total votes across all premiership season matches (including home and away matches and finals) wins the award.

The winner of the John Nicholls Medal was Chris Judd, who polled 473 votes. It was Judd's third consecutive John Nicholls Medal, in only his third season at the club. The win made Judd only the second player, after John Nicholls, to win Carlton's best and fairest award in three consecutive seasons. Judd won comfortably ahead of Jordan Russell (354 votes) and Marc Murphy (343 votes). The top ten is given below.

Pos.	Player	Votes
1st	Chris Judd	473
2nd	Jordan Russell	354
3rd	Marc Murphy	343
4th	Bryce Gibbs	322
5th	Andrew Carrazzo	310
6th	Kade Simpson	300
7th	Jeff Garlett	279
8th	Heath Scotland	243
9th	Eddie Betts	217
10th	Aaron Joseph	197

Other awards

The following other awards were presented on John Nicholls Medal night:-

- Best First-Year Player – Kane Lucas
- Best Clubman – Michael Jamison
- Women of Carlton Ambassador Award – Aaron Joseph
- Spirit of Carlton Encouragement Award – Jeff Garlett
- Carltonians Achievement Award – Kade Simpson

=== Brownlow Medal ===
Chris Judd won the 2010 Brownlow Medal. He polled 30 votes, to finish four votes ahead of second-placed Gary Ablett, Jr. (Geelong), and six votes ahead of pre-count favourite Dane Swan (Collingwood). It was Judd's second Brownlow Medal, and his first at Carlton; his previous Brownlow Medal was won with West Coast in 2004. Judd became the 13th player to win more than one Brownlow Medal, and the fourth to do so at more than one club. Judd was the fifth Carlton player to win a Brownlow Medal, and the first since Greg Williams in 1994.

Judd polled his thirty votes in only nineteen matches, after missing the first three weeks of the season with a suspension carried over from a misconduct charge in the 2009 Elimination Final; he then polled three votes in each of his first five matches to take the lead in the count, and was not headed thereafter.

=== AFLPA Awards ===
For each of the AFLPA awards, one or three Carlton players were nominated following internal vote of Carlton players (except for Best Captain, where captain Chris Judd was nominated by default). A vote of all players in the league, selecting from a ballot of all club nominees, was then used to determine the final placings. None of Carlton's nominees went on to win their awards.

Leigh Matthews Trophy (Most Valuable Player)

- Eddie Betts (nominated)
- Chris Judd (nominated)
- Kade Simpson (nominated)

Robert Rose Award (Most Courageous Player)

- Kade Simpson (nominated)

Best First Year Player

- Kane Lucas (nominated)

Best Captain

- Chris Judd (nominated by default)

=== Other awards ===
All-Australian Team

The 40-man squad for the All-Australian Team was announced on 31 August 2010, and the final team of 22 was announced on 13 September 2010. Chris Judd was the only Carlton player nominated in the squad, and he was named on the interchange in the final team.

Representative honours

Kade Simpson, Bryce Gibbs and Eddie Betts were all selected to represent Australia in the 2010 International Rules Series, held in Ireland. Simpson was selected as one of the team's three vice-captains.

AFL Rising Star

Two Carlton players were nominated for the AFL Rising Star award during the season:

- Round 1 – Chris Yarran
- Round 19 – Jeff Garlett

Garlett went on to poll five votes in the final count, to finish sixth for the award.

Other

Five people were inducted into the Carlton Football Club Hall of Fame, in the first batch of new inductees since the 2006 season. The new inductees were:

- Ron Barassi, dual premiership coach, one-time premiership player, and former captain-coach
- Vin Gardiner, dual premiership player and one-time league leading goalkicker.
- John Goold, dual premiership player
- Anthony Koutoufides, premiership player, former captain, Leigh Matthews Trophy winner and dual best-and-fairest
- David Parkin, three-time premiership coach

== Northern Bullants ==
The Carlton Football Club had a full affiliation with the Northern Bullants during the 2010 season. It was the eighth season of the clubs' affiliation, which had been in place since 2003. Carlton senior- and rookie-listed players who were not selected to play in the Carlton team were eligible to play for either the Northern Bullants seniors or reserves team. Home games were shared between the Bullants' traditional home ground, Preston City Oval, and Carlton's traditional home ground, Visy Park. Carlton development coach David Teague served also as the senior coach for the Bullants during the season.

The Bullants finished second out of fourteen in the VFL, after being defeated in the grand final by North Ballarat. It was the second consecutive season that the club had been beaten by the Roosters in the grand final. The Bullants had finished sixth on the ladder after the home-and-away season with a record of 10–8, but progressed to the grand final with upset wins against third-placed Casey and minor premiers Williamstown in the semi- and preliminary finals. By finishing inside the top three, the Bullants qualified for the inaugural season of the Foxtel Cup competition in 2011.

== Notes ==
:1. Although Hawthorn had a higher overall membership, that Victorian-based club additionally plays several home games in Tasmania each year.
:2. Ratten also served as head coach in the final six rounds of 2007 as caretaker, before being officially appointed as head coach for 2008.
