= 2009 Carlton Football Club season =

Carlton Football Club
2009 season
- President: Stephen Kernahan
- Coach: Brett Ratten
- Captain: Chris Judd
- Home grounds: Etihad Stadium (Training and administrative: Visy Park)
- AFL season: 7th (13–9)
- Finals series: 7th
- Best and Fairest: Chris Judd
- Leading goalkicker: Brendan Fevola (89)
- Club membership: 43,294

The 2009 Carlton Football Club season was the Carlton Football Club's 146th season, and 113th as a member of the Australian Football League.

Carlton finished 7th out of 16 teams in the 2009 AFL season. It was the first time that Carlton had played finals since 2001, ending what at that time was a club record drought of seven consecutive VFL/AFL seasons without a finals appearance. Full forward Brendan Fevola won the Coleman Medal as the league's leading goalkicker.

== Club summary ==
The 2009 AFL season was the 113th season of the VFL/AFL competition since its inception in 1897; and, having competed in every season, it was also the 113th season contested by the Carlton Football Club.

Former club champion Stephen Kernahan continued as club president in the 2009 season, a position he had held since August 2008. Brett Ratten and Chris Judd continued in their respective roles as senior coach and captain of the club, each entering his second season appointed to the job.^{Note 1} The club's joint major sponsors were car manufacturer Hyundai, unchanged from 2008, and national tourism promoter Tourism Malaysia, newly signed for the 2009 season. As in previous years, the club's primary home ground was Etihad Stadium – which was known until 1 March 2009 as Telstra Dome – with home games expecting to draw larger crowds played at the M.C.G.; the traditional home ground Princes Park was renamed from MC Labour Park to Visy Park in the offseason, and it continued to serve as the training and administrative base. As had been the case every year since 2003, Carlton had a full alignment with the Northern Bullants in the Victorian Football League, allowing Carlton-listed players to play with the Bullants when not selected in AFL matches.

=== Membership campaign: "They Know We're Coming" ===
The club marketed its 2009 membership campaign on what became one of the most well-remembered slogans in league history: "They Know We're Coming". CEO Greg Swann described the slogan as an irreverent way to rebuild the "Carlton arrogance" which the club was known for during its successful period, but which had been missing since the club's first wooden spoon in 2002 and in the aftermath of the salary cap breach that followed. The provocative slogan was immediately successful in generating discussion and interest, drawing scorn from many opposition fans, and notably drawing a response from traditional rivals Essendon, who published a "They Know We're Waiting" poster on its website. Carlton went on to sell 42,408 memberships for the 2009 season, a new record membership for the club, breaking the record of 40,764 set the previous season.

== Squad and player statistics for 2009 ==
Flags represent the state of origin, i.e. the state in which the player played his Under-18s football.

Senior List
No.	State	Player	Age	AFL Debut	Recruited from	Career (to end 2008)		2009 Player Statistics
No.	State	Player	Age	AFL Debut	Recruited from	Gms	Gls	Gms	Gls	B	D	K	HB	M	T	HO
1	(Victoria (state))	Andrew Walker	22	2004	Bendigo (U18)	81	30	6	2	3	112	63	49	33	7	–
2	(South Australia)	Jordan Russell	22	2005	West Adelaide	50	9	20	6	4	334	160	174	101	77	–
3	(Victoria (state))	Marc Murphy	21	2006	Oakleigh (U18)	57	32	23	31	17	588	286	302	107	89	–
4	(South Australia)	Bryce Gibbs	19	2007	Glenelg	43	19	23	15	8	615	321	294	141	92	2
5	(Victoria (state))	Chris Judd (c)	25	2002	Sandringham (U18), West Coast	155	153	23	12	19	609	319	290	54	102	–
6	(Victoria (state))	Kade Simpson	24	2003	Eastern (U18)	87	47	23	15	12	489	287	202	129	82	–
7	(Victoria (state))	Adam Bentick	22	2004	Calder (U18)	68	13	–	–	–	–	–	–	–	–	–
8	(Victoria (state))	Matthew Kreuzer	19	2008	Northern (U18)	20	13	23	13	11	320	123	197	73	71	394
9	(Western Australia)	Chris Johnson	22	2005	East Fremantle, Melbourne	31	2	10	1	1	145	97	48	40	26	–
10	(Western Australia)	Richard Hadley	25	2001	East Fremantle, Brisbane Lions	47	12	11	3	2	207	79	128	45	45	–
11	(Victoria (state))	Robert Warnock	21	2007	Sandringham (U18), Fremantle	21	4	–	–	–	–	–	–	–	–	–
12	(Tasmania)	Mitch Robinson	19	2009	Tasmania (U18/VFL)	–	–	10	5	5	125	71	54	41	28	2
13	(Western Australia)	Chris Yarran	18	2009	Swan Districts	–	–	6	4	4	57	37	20	18	17	–
14	(Victoria (state))	Brad Fisher	24	2003	Eastern Ranges	91	118	7	8	2	91	51	40	46	11	–
15	(Western Australia)	Steven Browne	19	2008	West Perth	13	4	7	1	–	113	51	62	34	19	–
16	(Victoria (state))	Shaun Grigg	20	2007	North Ballarat (U18)	25	4	10	3	5	196	94	102	32	29	3
17	(Republic of Ireland)	Setanta Ó hAilpín	25	2005	Cork GAA	46	18	12	12	8	129	56	73	39	13	7
18	(Western Australia)	Paul Bower	20	2006	Peel	24	2	21	–	–	409	183	226	122	39	–
19	(Victoria (state))	Eddie Betts	22	2005	Calder (U18)	75	85	22	38	21	265	156	109	55	78	–
20	(South Australia)	Rhys O'Keeffe	18	–	North Adelaide	–	–	–	–	–	–	–	–	–	–	–
21	(South Australia)	Mark Austin	19	2007	Glenelg	5	–	9	1	1	86	34	52	24	20	1
22	(Queensland)	Shaun Hampson	20	2007	Mount Gravatt	12	2	15	3	4	124	35	89	34	31	278
23	(South Australia)	Adam Hartlett	22	2007	West Adelaide	8	2	3	–	–	30	18	12	7	7	4
24	(Victoria (state))	Nick Stevens	28	1998	Northern (U18), Port Adelaide	214	127	17	12	6	387	215	172	73	53	–
25	(Victoria (state))	Brendan Fevola	27	1999	Dandenong (U18)	164	486	23	89	57	297	251	46	148	50	6
26	(Northern Territory)	Joe Anderson	20	2007	Darwin	9	–	3	–	–	40	12	28	5	7	–
27	(Western Australia)	Dennis Armfield	22	2008	Swan Districts	9	2	17	–	1	230	91	139	42	46	–
28	(Victoria (state))	Cameron Cloke	24	2004	Eastern (U18), Collingwood	47	28	10	8	6	123	78	45	66	20	64
29	(Victoria (state))	Heath Scotland (lg)	28	1999	Western (U18), Collingwood	159	52	17	5	1	408	185	223	83	50	–
30	(Victoria (state))	Jarrad Waite	25	2003	Murray (U18)	106	107	9	10	2	178	132	46	66	10	–
31	(Victoria (state))	Jordan Bannister	26	2001	Calder (U18), Essendon	65	15	2	2	–	19	14	5	6	4	–
32	(Victoria (state))	Bret Thornton	25	2002	Oakleigh (U18)	128	2	21	2	–	406	244	162	167	25	1
33	(Victoria (state))	Ryan Houlihan	26	2000	Murray (U18)	162	99	20	13	5	402	206	196	74	51	–
34	(Tasmania)	Simon Wiggins	26	2001	Glenorchy	103	32	13	4	8	194	80	114	76	41	–
35	(Victoria (state))	Caleb Tiller	17	–	Murray (U18)	–	–	–	–	–	–	–	–	–	–	–
37	(Victoria (state))	Jake Edwards	20	2008	Western (U18)	5	4	–	–	–	–	–	–	–	–	–
40	(Victoria (state))	Michael Jamison	22	2007	North Ballarat (U18, VFL)	21	–	13	–	–	113	67	46	49	20	–
44	(Victoria (state))	Andrew Carrazzo	25	2004	Oakleigh (U18), Geelong	84	20	15	12	8	354	180	174	58	47	–
Rookie List
No.	State	Player	Age	AFL Debut	Recruited from	Career (to end 2008)		2009 Player Statistics
No.	State	Player	Age	AFL Debut	Recruited from	Gms	Gls	Gms	Gls	B	D	K	HB	M	T	HO
36	(South Australia)	Darren Pfeiffer	21	2008	Norwood, Adelaide	7	4	–	–	–	–	–	–	–	–	–
38	(Western Australia)	Jeff Garlett	19	2009	Swan Districts	–	–	10	12	9	94	72	22	34	23	–
39	(South Australia)	Sam Jacobs	20	2009	Woodville-West Torrens	–	–	4	1	–	33	9	24	12	4	58
41	(Victoria (state))	Lachie Hill	19	–	Oakleigh (U18)	–	–	–	–	–	–	–	–	–	–	–
42	(Victoria (state))	Luke Stanton	18	–	Northern (U18)	–	–	–	–	–	–	–	–	–	–	–
45	(Tasmania)	Aaron Joseph	19	2009	Tasmania (U18)	–	–	23	3	6	257	117	140	55	92	–
46	(Western Australia)	David Ellard	19	2008	Swan Districts	1	1	–	–	–	–	–	–	–	–	–
47	(Victoria (state))	Greg Bentley	21	2006	Dandenong (U18), Port Adelaide	21	6	5	2	0	57	30	27	15	16	–
For players: (c) denotes captain, (vc) denotes vice-captain, (lg) denotes leadership group. Players' ages are given for 31 December 2008. Statistics for AFL matches: Gms – Games played, Gls – Goals, B – Behinds, D – Disposals, K – Kicks, HB – Handballs, M – Marks, T – Tackles, HO – Hitouts. Source for statistics: AFL Tables.

== Playing list changes ==
The following summarises all player changes between the conclusion of the 2008 season and the conclusion of the 2009 season.

=== In ===
Player	Previous club	League	via
(Victoria (state)) Robert Warnock	Fremantle	AFL	AFL Trade Week, with pick No. 69, in exchange for picks No. 24, 56 and 72.
(Western Australia) Chris Yarran	Swan Districts	WAFL	AFL National Draft, first round (pick No. 6)
(Tasmania) Mitch Robinson	Tasmanian Devils	VFL	AFL National Draft, third round (pick No. 40)
(South Australia) Rhys O'Keeffe	North Adelaide	SANFL	AFL National Draft, fifth round (pick No. 65)
(Victoria (state)) Caleb Tiller	Murray Bushrangers	TAC Cup	AFL National Draft, sixth round (pick No. 80)
(Western Australia) Chris Johnson	Melbourne	AFL	AFL Pre-season Draft, first round (pick No. 4)
(Western Australia) Jeff Garlett	Swan Districts	WAFL	AFL Rookie Draft, first round (pick No. 6)
(Victoria (state)) Luke Stanton	Northern Knights	TAC Cup	AFL Rookie Draft, second round (pick No. 22)
(Victoria (state)) Greg Bentley	Port Adelaide	AFL	AFL Rookie Draft, third round (pick No. 37)

=== Out ===
Player	New Club	League	via
(Victoria (state)) Jason Saddington	Northern Bullants	VFL	Retired from the AFL
(South Australia) Cain Ackland	North Adelaide	SANFL	Delisted
(Western Australia) Clinton Benjamin	North Ballarat	VFL	Delisted
(Western Australia) Luke Blackwell	Claremont	WAFL	Delisted
(Victoria (state)) Ryan Jackson	Claremont	WAFL	Delisted
(Republic of Ireland) Aisake Ó hAilpín	Cork GAA	GAA	Delisted

=== List management ===
Player	Change
(Victoria (state)) Michael Jamison	Promoted from the rookie list to the senior list for the 2009 season.
(South Australia) Darren Pfeiffer	Delisted, then redrafted as a rookie during the AFL Rookie Draft, fourth round (pick No. 51)
(Victoria (state)) Lachie Hill	Delisted from the rookie list, then redrafted as a rookie during the AFL Rookie Draft, fifth round (pick No. 65)
(South Australia) Sam Jacobs	Delisted from the rookie list, then redrafted as a rookie during the AFL Rookie Draft, sixth round (pick No. 76)

== Season summary ==
=== Pre-season matches ===
==== NAB Cup ====
**Round**	**Date and local time**	**Opponent**	**Scores** (Carlton's scores indicated in **bold**)			**Venue**	**Attendance**
**Round**	**Date and local time**	**Opponent**	Home	Away	Result	**Venue**	**Attendance**
1	Friday, 20 February (7:40 pm)	North Melbourne	**1.17.12 (123)**	0.11.4 (70)	Won by 53 points Report	Telstra Dome (H)	24,711
2	Sunday, 1 March (4:40 pm)	Hawthorn	**2.13.16 (112)**	2.10.10 (88)	Won by 24 points Report	Etihad Stadium (H)	19,111
3	Saturday, 7 March (7:10 pm)	Geelong	2.9.12 (84)	**0.9.13 (67)**	Lost by 17 points Report	Etihad Stadium (A)	15,305

==== NAB Challenge ====
**Week**	**Date and local time**	**Opponent**	**Scores** (Carlton's scores indicated in **bold**)			**Venue**	**Attendance**
**Week**	**Date and local time**	**Opponent**	Home	Away	Result	**Venue**	**Attendance**
4	Saturday, 14 March	Fremantle	20.6 (126)	**12.11 (83)**	Lost by 43 points Report	Hands Oval, Bunbury (A)	10,000 (approx.)

=== Home-and-away season ===
Carlton had a strong season. Although its win–loss record was only 6–6 after twelve rounds, four of its six losses came by less than ten points. After falling to eighth place with a 69-point loss to Essendon in Round 13, Carlton won seven of its following eight games to cement a place in the finals for the first time since 2001. In the final round match against Adelaide, both teams were fighting for 5th place and a home elimination final; the result was Carlton's heaviest loss of the season, 72 points, which saw Carlton finish 7th, and required them to travel to Brisbane for the first week of the finals.

Carlton's full season win–loss record was 13–9, a notable improvement on its record of 10–12 from the 2008 season. The club's form throughout the season unpredictable; Carlton returned a 3–2 record against the top four teams, including an impressive Round 19 upset victory against eventual premiers Geelong, but only 2–4 against the next four teams on the ladder; Carlton's record against the bottom eight was 8–3, with all three of those losses coming inside the first seven rounds of the season.

**Round**	**Date and local time**	**Opponent**	**Scores** (Carlton's scores indicated in **bold**)			**Venue**	**Attendance**	**Ladder** **position**
**Round**	**Date and local time**	**Opponent**	Home	Away	Result	**Venue**	**Attendance**	**Ladder** **position**
1	Thursday, 26 March (7:40 pm)	Richmond	9.13 (67)	**23.12 (150)**	Won by 83 points Report	M.C.G. (A)	87,043	1st
2	Saturday, 4 April (7:10 pm)	Brisbane Lions	**18.11 (119)**	15.10 (100)	Won by 19 points Report	Etihad Stadium (H)	42,496	1st
3	Saturday, 11 April (7:10 pm)	Essendon	**16.16 (112)**	17.14 (116)	Lost by 4 points Report	M.C.G. (H)	70,370	4th
4	Saturday, 18 April (2:10 pm)	Sydney	12.12 (84)	**9.13 (67)**	Lost by 17 points Report	S.C.G. (A)	30,824	5th
5	Sunday, 26 April (2:10 pm)	Western Bulldogs	13.12 (90)	**21.7 (133)**	Won by 43 points Report	Etihad Stadium (A)	44,268	3rd
6	Saturday, 2 May (2:10 pm)	Hawthorn	16.10 (106)	**15.12 (102)**	Lost by 4 points Report	M.C.G. (A)	69,814	4th
7	Saturday, 9 May (7:10 pm)	Fremantle	**11.15 (81)**	13.10 (88)	Lost by 7 points Report	Gold Coast Stadium (H)	10,294	7th
8	Sunday, 17 May (2:10 pm)	Collingwood	7.11 (53)	**16.8 (104)**	Won by 51 points Report	M.C.G. (A)	82,834	6th
9	Saturday, 23 May (2:40 pm)	Adelaide	15.14 (104)	**8.12 (60)**	Lost by 44 points Report	AAMI Stadium (A)	41,107	9th
10	Friday, 29 May (7:40 pm)	West Coast	**16.15 (111)**	10.10 (70)	Won by 41 points Report	Etihad Stadium (H)	39,611	5th
11	Saturday, 6 June (7:10 pm)	Brisbane Lions	16.10 (106)	**16.16 (112)**	Won by 6 points Report	The Gabba (A)	33,790	4th
12	Friday, 12 June (7:40 pm)	St Kilda	**14.11 (95)**	16.8 (104)	Lost by 9 points Report	Etihad Stadium (H)	50,820	7th
13	Friday, 26 June (7:40 pm)	Essendon	21.10 (136)	**9.13 (67)**	Lost by 69 points Report	M.C.G. (A)	83,407	8th
14	Sunday, 5 July (2:40 pm)	Fremantle	15.10 (100)	**16.19 (115)**	Won by 15 points Report	Subiaco Oval	34,720	7th
15	Saturday, 11 July (2:10 pm)	Richmond	**16.13 (109)**	12.17 (89)	Won by 20 points Report	M.C.G. (H)	50,784	7th
16	Saturday, 18 July (2:10 pm)	Sydney	**19.10 (124)**	9.9 (63)	Won by 61 points Report	Etihad Stadium (H)	42,018	7th
17	Friday, 24 July (7:40 pm)	Collingwood	**4.16 (40)**	14.10 (94)	Lost by 54 points Report	M.C.G. (H)	84,938	7th
18	Friday, 31 July (7:40 pm)	North Melbourne	11.18 (84)	**14.10 (94)**	Won by 10 points Report	Etihad Stadium (A)	38,554	7th
19	Friday, 7 August (7:40 pm)	Geelong	**14.13 (97)**	8.14 (62)	Won by 35 points Report	M.C.G. (H)	55,057	6th
20	Sunday, 16 August (2:40 pm)	Port Adelaide	9.13 (67)	**18.13 (121)**	Won by 54 points Report	AAMI Stadium (A)	27,221	5th
21	Saturday, 22 August (2:10 pm)	Melbourne	**24.9 (153)**	15.6 (96)	Won by 57 points Report	Etihad Stadium (H)	37,433	5th
22	Saturday, 29 August (4:10 pm)	Adelaide	**16.8 (104)**	27.14 (176)	Lost by 72 points Report	Etihad Stadium (H)	42,356	7th

=== Finals ===
Playing its first final since 2001, Carlton and Brisbane fought an evenly contested first half, and Brisbane took a one-point lead into half time. Carlton dominated the third quarter, kicking six goals to two; and, after a goal in the first minute of the final quarter, led by 30 points. But from there, Brisbane kicked the final six goals of the match, to overrun the Blues and win the match by seven points.

**Week**	**Date and local time**	**Opponent**	**Scores** (Carlton's scores indicated in **bold**)			**Venue**	**Attendance**
**Week**	**Date and local time**	**Opponent**	Home	Away	Result	**Venue**	**Attendance**
Second Elimination Final	Saturday, 5 September (7:30 pm)	Brisbane Lions	16.15 (111)	**15.14 (104)**	Lost by 7 points Report	The Gabba (A)	32,702

== Ladder ==
2009 AFL ladder
Pos	Team	Pld	W	L	D	PF	PA	PP	Pts	
1	St Kilda	22	20	2	0	2197	1411	155.7	80	Finals series
2	Geelong (P)	22	18	4	0	2312	1815	127.4	72	Finals series
3	Western Bulldogs	22	15	7	0	2378	1940	122.6	60	Finals series
4	Collingwood	22	15	7	0	2174	1778	122.3	60	Finals series
5	Adelaide	22	14	8	0	2104	1789	117.6	56	Finals series
6	Brisbane Lions	22	13	8	1	2017	1890	106.7	54	Finals series
7	Carlton	22	13	9	0	2270	2055	110.5	52	Finals series
8	Essendon	22	10	11	1	2080	2127	97.8	42	Finals series
9	Hawthorn	22	9	13	0	1962	2120	92.5	36	
10	Port Adelaide	22	9	13	0	1990	2244	88.7	36	
11	West Coast	22	8	14	0	1893	2029	93.3	32	
12	Sydney	22	8	14	0	1888	2027	93.1	32	
13	North Melbourne	22	7	14	1	1680	2015	83.4	30	
14	Fremantle	22	6	16	0	1747	2259	77.3	24	
15	Richmond	22	5	16	1	1774	2388	74.3	22	
16	Melbourne	22	4	18	0	1706	2285	74.7	16	

Source: AFL ladder
Rules for classification: 1) points; 2) percentage; 3) number of points for.
(P) Premiers

== Leading goalkickers ==
Brendan Fevola was Carlton's leading goalkicker for 2009, kicking 89 goals for the season. It was the seventh consecutive and final time that Fevola won the club goalkicking. The 89 goal tally was the second-highest of Fevola's career, second to his 99 goals in the 2008 season. Fevola also won the Coleman Medal, as his tally of 86 goals in the home-and-away season was the highest in the league.

Small forward Eddie Betts was second with 38 goals, the highest in his career at that point, and Marc Murphy was third, kicking 31 goals from the midfield.

Player	Goals	Behinds
Brendan Fevola	89	57
Eddie Betts	38	21
Marc Murphy	31	17
Kade Simpson	15	12
Bryce Gibbs	15	8

== Team awards and records ==
Game records

- Round 1 – Carlton's winning margin of 83 points against Richmond was its highest in any game since Round 10, 2001.
- Round 16 – Carlton defeated Sydney for the first time since 2000, ending a twelve-game losing streak against that opponent. It was Carlton's equal-longest losing streak against any single opponent since 1902 (equal with a concurrent twelve-game losing streak against St Kilda, which was broken in 2010).
- First Elimination final – Carlton played its first finals match since the First Semi Final, 2001, on 15 September 2001, ending a club record drought of six years, 355 days between finals matches.

Season records

- Carlton's finishing position (7th), win–loss record (13–9), total score (2270 points), total score conceded (2055 points) and percentage (110.46) were all the best that the club had achieved since the 2001 season.

Other

- Round 8 – Carlton won the 2009 Peter Mac Cup with its win over Collingwood.

== Notable events ==
Altercation between Setanta Ó hAilpín and Cameron Cloke

Setanta Ó hAilpín was suspended for four matches by the AFL Tribunal for striking, then kicking Cameron Cloke during an intra-club practice match in early February; the intra-club match unusually fell under the tribunal's jurisdiction because it was an AFL-sanctioned game, and was officiated by AFL umpires as part of their preseason. Ó hAilpín was also briefly internally suspended by the club for the incident.

Death of Richard Pratt

The club's immediate past president Richard Pratt died on 28 April, prior to Round 6, after his battle with prostate cancer. A long time benefactor of the club, Pratt had served as president from February 2007 until July 2008, and was a key off-field figure in Carlton's recovery from its poor condition in the mid-2000s to its return to the finals this year.

Following Pratt's death, the Carlton and Collingwood Football Clubs established the Richard Pratt Cup, a new trophy to presented in perpetuity to the winner of Carlton's annual home match against Collingwood, accompanying an event to raise money for the Pratt Foundation. The trophy was first contested in Round 17, and was won by Collingwood. The Richard Pratt Cup became a companion to the Peter Mac Cup, which had been contested annually between Carlton and Collingwood since 1993, and accompanied an event to raise money for the Peter MacCallum Cancer Centre. The teams had previously shared hosting duties, but with the establishment of the Richard Pratt Cup, Collingwood became the host of all Peter Mac Cup matches.

Round 7 – home game on the Gold Coast

Carlton played its Round 7 home match at Gold Coast Stadium in Queensland, in return for a guaranteed $400,000 payment from the AFL. After North Melbourne – which had played three matches at the stadium in each of 2007 and 2008 – rejected a proposal to relocate permanently to the Gold Coast, the league offered to pay for Victorian clubs to shift home games there in 2009, in order to continue the league's presence in the area until the Gold Coast Suns could be entered the league in 2011. Carlton, St Kilda and Richmond each accepted the $400,000 offer to play one game there during the 2009 season.

Round 14 – Livestrong yellow guernsey

In its away game against Fremantle at Subiaco Oval in Round 14, Carlton wore a once-off yellow Livestrong guernsey, instead of its normal white clash guernsey, to raise money for cancer research. Money raised in the event was divided between the Livestrong Foundation (then known as the Lance Armstrong Foundation) and the Peter MacCallum Cancer Centre. The guernseys were yellow with navy blue cuffs, collar, side-panels, monogram and numbers.

Brendan Fevola's behaviour at the Brownlow Medal

Brendan Fevola caused trouble when he drank excessively at the Brownlow Medal Count. He served as the host of The Footy Show's Street Talk segment, but was so obnoxiously drunk while filming it that the show did not air it. Already on his final disciplinary chance with Carlton following his indiscretion the previous season, the incident led to Fevola being traded to the Brisbane Lions in the offseason.

== Individual awards and records ==
=== John Nicholls Medal ===
The Carlton Football Club Best and Fairest awards night took place on 28 September. The John Nicholls Medal, for the best and fairest player of the club, as well as several other awards, were presented on the night. Brendan Fevola, after his behaviour at the Brownlow Medal, did not attend the event.

John Nicholls Medal

The voting system for the John Nicholls Medal remained the same as in 2008. In each match, the five members of the Match Committee awarded votes. Each committee member could award votes to up to eight players, and each player could receive up to ten votes from each judge. A "perfect score" for a round is 50 votes. The player with the most total votes across all premiership season matches (including home and away matches and finals) wins the award.

The winner of the John Nicholls Medal was Chris Judd, who polled 558 votes. It was Judd's second consecutive John Nicholls Medal, in only his second season at the club, and was the second of three John Nicholls Medals that Judd would win consecutively from 2008 to 2010. Judd won comfortably ahead of Marc Murphy (451 votes) and Bryce Gibbs (415 votes). The top ten is given below.

Pos.	Player	Votes
1st	Chris Judd	558
2nd	Marc Murphy	451
3rd	Bryce Gibbs	415
4th	Brendan Fevola	390
5th	Matthew Kreuzer	311
6th	Jordan Russell	281
7th	Paul Bower	279
8th	Kade Simpson	254
9th	Bret Thornton	225
10th	Aaron Joseph	201

Other awards

The following other awards were presented on John Nicholls Medal night:-

- Best First-Year Player – Aaron Joseph
- Best Clubman – David Ellard
- Spirit of Carlton Encouragement Award – Jordan Russell

=== Coleman Medal ===
Brendan Fevola was the winner of the Coleman Medal as the league's leading goalkicker, kicking 86 goals in the home-and-away season to finish ahead of Brisbane's Jonathan Brown (78 goals) and St Kilda's Nick Riewoldt (68 goals). It was Fevola's second career Coleman Medal, after winning the award in 2006; in doing so, Fevola became the first Carlton player since George Coulthard in the 1878, 1879 and 1880 VFA seasons to win the league goalkicking more than once in his career, and the first Carlton player ever to achieve the feat in the VFL/AFL.

=== Brownlow Medal ===
Chris Judd finished second for the 2009 Brownlow Medal, polling 22 votes; he finished eight votes behind runaway winner Gary Ablett Jr. (Geelong). Marc Murphy and Bryce Gibbs each polled 15 votes to finish equal-ninth.

=== AFLPA awards ===
For each of the AFLPA awards, one or three Carlton players were nominated following internal vote of Carlton players (except for Best Captain, where captain Chris Judd was nominated by default). Chris Judd went on to finish third for the Leigh Matthews Trophy; none of Carlton's other nominees placed.

Leigh Matthews Trophy (Most Valuable Player)

- Bryce Gibbs (nominated)
- Chris Judd (third place)
- Marc Murphy (nominated)

Robert Rose Award (Most Courageous Player)

- Simon Wiggins (nominated)

Best First Year Player

- Aaron Joseph (nominated)

Best Captain

- Chris Judd (nominated by default)

=== Other awards ===
All-Australian Team

The 40-man squad for the All-Australian Team was announced on 1 September 2009, and the final team of 22 was announced on 14 September 2010, with both Judd and Fevola named in the team.

- Brendan Fevola (full-forward)
- Chris Judd (ruck rover, vice captain)
- Marc Murphy (nominated in 40-man squad)

AFL Rising Star

Aaron Joseph was nominated for the 2009 AFL Rising Star award for his performance in Carlton's Round 12 win against St Kilda. Joseph did not poll votes in the final count.

Representative honours

Chris Yarran was represented the Indigenous All-Stars team, which played a pre-season match against Adelaide on 7 February.

Australian Football Hall of Fame

Ken Hands, who played with Carlton from 1945 to 1957, then coached the club from 1959 to 1964, was inducted into the Australian Football Hall of Fame.

=== Player records ===
- Round 5 – Brendan Fevola kicked his 500th career goal, the third player to do so for the Carlton Football Club, after Harry Vallence and Stephen Kernahan.
- Round 15 – Brendan Fevola kicked nine goals in the match against Richmond. It was the highest goalkicking haul of Fevola's AFL career, after having previously kicked eight goals on eight separate occasions.

== Northern Bullants ==
The Carlton Football Club had a full affiliation with the Northern Bullants during the 2009 season. It was the seventh season of the clubs' affiliation, which had been in place since 2003. Carlton senior- and rookie-listed players who were not selected to play in the Carlton team were eligible to play for either the Northern Bullants seniors or reserves team, including both Victorian Football League matches. Home games were shared between the Bullants' traditional home ground, Preston City Oval, and Carlton's traditional home ground, Visy Park. Carlton development coach David Teague served also as the senior coach for the Bullants during the season.

The Bullants finished second out of fourteen in the VFL, after being defeated in the grand final by North Ballarat by 23 points. It was the Bullants' first grand final appearance since 1984. The Bullants had finished third on the ladder after the home-and-away season. Carlton rookie-listed player David Ellard, who did not play at AFL level during the season, won the Laurie Hill Trophy as the Bullants' best and fairest.

== Notes ==
:1. Ratten also served as head coach in the final six rounds of 2007 as caretaker, before being officially appointed as head coach for 2008.
