= 2008 Carlton Football Club season =

Carlton Football Club
2008 season
- President: Richard Pratt, Stephen Kernahan
- Coach: Brett Ratten
- Captain: Chris Judd
- Home grounds: Telstra Dome (Training and administrative: MC Labour Park)
- AFL season: 11th (10–12)
- Best and Fairest: Chris Judd
- Leading goalkicker: Brendan Fevola (99)
- Club membership: 40,764

The 2008 Carlton Football Club season was the Carlton Football Club's 145th season, and 112th as a member of the Australian Football League.

The club saw many changes to key personnel in 2008, with West Coast champion Chris Judd coming to the club as a new captain, former club captain Brett Ratten appointed senior coach, and Stephen Kernahan replacing Richard Pratt as president mid-season.

Carlton finished 11th out of 16 teams with ten wins and twelve losses in the 2008 AFL season. Although this did not result in a finals appearance, the season marked the end of one of the least successful periods in club history, which had seen five finishes in the bottom two between 2002 and 2007.

== Club summary ==
The 2008 AFL season was the 112th season of the VFL/AFL competition since its inception in 1897; and, having competed in every season, it was also the 112th season contested by the Carlton Football Club.

As in previous years, the club's primary home ground was Telstra Dome, with home games expecting to draw larger crowds played at the Melbourne Cricket Ground; the traditional home ground MC Labour Park continued to serve as the training and administrative base. The club's joint major sponsors were telecommunications provider Optus, unchanged from 2007, and car manufacturer Hyundai, newly signed for the 2008 season; it was the start of Hyundai's second long-term stint as a major sponsor of the club, having previously been the major sponsor from 1995 to 1999. As had been the case every year since 2003, Carlton had a full alignment with the Northern Bullants in the Victorian Football League, allowing Carlton-listed players to play with the Bullants when not selected in AFL matches.

Carlton set a new club record membership, with a total of 40,764 members for the season, a significant increase on the previous record, set in 2007, of 35,431. The club's improved onfield performances also resulted an increase in attendances far in excess of those budgeted by the club, allowing the club to post a healthy operating profit for the season.

== Senior personnel ==
=== Presidency ===
Businessman and long-time benefactor of the club, Richard Pratt, was president of the club at the beginning of the season. However, he stepped down from the role in June 2008, in order to face criminal charges relating to his packaging business, Visy. Visy and competitor Amcor had been found guilty of price fixing in November 2007, but in June 2008, Pratt was personally charged with giving false and misleading evidence during the Australian Competition & Consumer Commission's investigation of the cartel, and he stepped aside from the football club to face the charges.

Pratt had served as president since February 2007. He was replaced by vice-president and former club captain Stephen Kernahan. The charges against Pratt were ultimately dropped, shortly before his death less than a year later in April 2009.

=== Senior coach ===
Denis Pagan, Carlton's appointed senior coach at the start of 2007, had been sacked after Round 16, bringing an end to a 4½ year tenure in the role. Assistant coach and former club captain Brett Ratten, who had stepped in as caretaker coach after Pagan's dismissal, was appointed as the new senior coach for the 2008 season.

In the weeks following Pagan's dismissal, there was intense media speculation surrounding the possibility that former Brisbane Lions captain Michael Voss would be appointed as senior coach. Voss had retired from playing after 2006 and had no formal coaching experience, but was at the time considered likely to transition almost immediately into an AFL coaching role. Carlton did approach Voss as a potential candidate, but he withdrew from the selection process relatively early. By the end of the selection process, three potential coaches remained, with Ratten selected ahead of Collingwood assistant coach Guy McKenna and Western Bulldogs assistant coach Chris Bond. The appointment was formally announced on 20 August 2007, with two matches still remaining in the 2007 season. Voss went on to coach Brisbane Lions for five years, then serve as an assistant at Port Adelaide for seven years, before eventually joining Carlton as senior coach in 2022.

=== Captaincy and leadership ===
Lance Whitnall, who had served as captain in the 2007 season, was delisted, and Chris Judd was elected to the captaincy in his place, despite having not previously played a game for the Blues. Judd had not been promised the captaincy as part of the conditions to trade him to the club, but his performance during the pre-season convinced the match committee and player group that he should take on the role. Nick Stevens was appointed vice-captain. Andrew Carrazzo, Kade Simpson, Heath Scotland and Brendan Fevola made up the balance of the six-man leadership group when it was appointed in January, but Fevola was stood down from the group prior to the premiership season for disciplinary reasons.

== Squad and player statistics for 2008 ==
Flags represent the state of origin, i.e. the state in which the player played his Under-18s football.

Senior List
No.	State	Player	Age	AFL Debut	Recruited from	Career (to end 2007)		2008 Player Statistics
No.	State	Player	Age	AFL Debut	Recruited from	Gms	Gls	Gms	Gls	B	D	K	HB	M	T	HO
1	(Victoria (state))	Andrew Walker	21	2004	Bendigo (U18)	74	24	7	6	2	138	87	51	44	20	1
2	(South Australia)	Jordan Russell	21	2005	West Adelaide	29	5	21	4	13	262	130	207	109	69	–
3	(Victoria (state))	Marc Murphy	20	2006	Oakleigh (U18)	35	18	22	14	11	542	335	207	137	58	1
4	(South Australia)	Bryce Gibbs	18	2007	Glenelg	22	15	21	14	3	435	242	193	118	73	8
5	(Victoria (state))	Chris Judd (c)	24	2002	Sandringham (U18), West Coast	134	138	21	15	9	508	250	258	41	81	–
6	(Victoria (state))	Kade Simpson (lg)	23	2003	Eastern (U18)	65	38	22	9	14	412	242	170	137	61	–
7	(Victoria (state))	Adam Bentick	22	2004	Calder (U18)	54	13	14	–	2	253	98	155	44	80	1
8	(Victoria (state))	Matthew Kreuzer	18	2008	Northern (U18)	–	–	20	13	1	195	96	99	59	45	183
9	(Victoria (state))	Jason Saddington	28	1998	Eastern (U18), Sydney	160	47	2	–	–	26	11	15	12	3	–
10	(Western Australia)	Richard Hadley	24	2001	East Fremantle, Brisbane Lions	41	10	6	2	3	90	41	49	26	27	3
11	(South Australia)	Cain Ackland	25	2001	Port Adelaide (SANFL, AFL), St Kilda	73	25	1	–	–	11	5	6	5	–	12
13	(Western Australia)	Luke Blackwell	21	2006	Swan Districts	23	4	–	–	–	–	–	–	–	–	–
14	(Victoria (state))	Brad Fisher	23	2003	Eastern Ranges	70	93	20	25	22	291	210	81	151	23	–
15	(Western Australia)	Steven Browne	18	2008	West Perth	–	–	13	4	2	152	76	76	38	21	1
16	(Victoria (state))	Shaun Grigg	19	2007	North Ballarat (U18)	5	–	20	4	5	314	164	150	81	42	–
17	(Republic of Ireland)	Setanta Ó hAilpín	24	2005	Cork GAA	34	15	12	3	3	129	71	58	41	13	12
18	(Western Australia)	Paul Bower	19	2006	Peel	12	2	12	–	1	180	91	89	61	16	–
19	(Victoria (state))	Eddie Betts	21	2005	Calder (U18)	57	60	18	25	10	233	143	90	62	33	1
20	(Western Australia)	Clint Benjamin	19	–	Claremont	–	–	–	–	–	–	–	–	–	–	–
21	(South Australia)	Mark Austin	18	2007	Glenelg	1	–	4	–	–	35	16	19	10	5	–
22	(Queensland)	Shaun Hampson	19	2007	Mount Gravatt	2	1	10	1	–	60	26	34	20	6	82
23	(South Australia)	Adam Hartlett	21	2007	West Adelaide	4	1	4	1	2	24	17	7	11	6	–
24	(Victoria (state))	Nick Stevens	27	1998	Northern (U18), Port Adelaide	192	110	22	17	6	517	304	213	113	60	1
25	(Victoria (state))	Brendan Fevola (lg*)	26	1999	Dandenong (U18)	142	387	22	99	51	258	214	44	129	38	7
26	(Northern Territory)	Joe Anderson	19	2007	Darwin	5	–	4	–	–	51	27	24	15	5	–
27	(Western Australia)	Dennis Armfield	21	2008	Swan Districts	–	–	9	2	1	110	48	62	17	14	–
28	(Victoria (state))	Cameron Cloke	23	2004	Eastern (U18), Collingwood	27	14	20	14	6	263	146	117	119	41	215
29	(Victoria (state))	Heath Scotland (lg)	27	1999	Western (U18), Collingwood	138	41	21	11	5	503	296	207	122	45	1
30	(Victoria (state))	Jarrad Waite	24	2003	Murray (U18)	85	100	21	7	5	387	256	131	138	66	5
31	(Victoria (state))	Jordan Bannister	25	2001	Calder (U18), Essendon	60	13	5	2	–	53	40	13	32	6	–
32	(Victoria (state))	Bret Thornton	24	2002	Oakleigh (U18)	109	1	19	1	2	313	218	95	106	20	–
33	(Victoria (state))	Ryan Houlihan	25	2000	Murray (U18)	157	94	5	5	3	94	56	38	19	6	–
34	(Tasmania)	Simon Wiggins	25	2001	Glenorchy	89	20	14	12	5	181	74	107	79	26	1
35	(Republic of Ireland)	Aisake Ó hAilpín	22	–	Cork GAA	–	–	–	–	–	–	–	–	–	–	–
36	(South Australia)	Darren Pfeiffer	21	2008	Norwood, Adelaide	–	–	7	4	2	80	44	36	26	17	–
37	(Victoria (state))	Jake Edwards	20	2008	Western (U18)	–	–	5	4	4	47	34	13	28	7	–
38	(Victoria (state))	Ryan Jackson	20	2006	Northern (U18)	8	3	1	–	–	10	7	3	3	1	–
44	(Victoria (state))	Andrew Carrazzo (lg)	24	2004	Oakleigh (U18), Geelong	63	16	21	4	3	537	282	255	133	65	3
Rookie List
No.	State	Player	Age	AFL Debut	Recruited from	Career (to end 2007)		2008 Player Statistics
No.	State	Player	Age	AFL Debut	Recruited from	Gms	Gls	Gms	Gls	B	D	K	HB	M	T	HO
39	(South Australia)	Sam Jacobs	19	–	Woodville-West Torrens	–	–	–	–	–	–	–	–	–	–	–
40	(Victoria (state))	Michael Jamison	21	2007	North Ballarat (U18, VFL)	5	–	16	–	1	142	98	44	61	29	–
41	(Victoria (state))	Lachie Hill	18	–	Oakleigh (U18)	–	–	–	–	–	–	–	–	–	–	–
45	(Tasmania)	Aaron Joseph	18	–	Tasmania (U18)	–	–	–	–	–	–	–	–	–	–	–
46	(Western Australia)	David Ellard	18	2008	Swan Districts	–	–	1	1	–	4	4	–	2	–	–
For players: (c) denotes captain, (vc) denotes vice-captain, (lg) denotes leadership group. Players' ages are given for 31 December 2007. Statistics for AFL matches: Gms – Games played, Gls – Goals, B – Behinds, D – Disposals, K – Kicks, HB – Handballs, M – Marks, T – Tackles, HO – Hitouts. Source for statistics: AFL Tables.

== Playing list changes ==
The following summarises all player changes between the conclusion of the 2007 season and the conclusion of the 2008 season.

=== Priority draft pick ===
Having finished second-last in 2007, Carlton received the second selection in each round of the draft. Additionally, the club received a priority draft pick in the National Draft as a result of finishing the 2007 season with a record of 4–18; under the rules in place at the time, priority selections were given to all teams who earned fewer than 16.5 premiership points for the year.

Because Carlton had also received a priority draft pick in the previous season, this season's priority selection was taken before the first round of the draft, rather than before the second round. This gave Carlton the No. 1 draft pick for the third consecutive draft.

=== Trade for Chris Judd ===
On 16 September 2007, shortly after his club was eliminated in the semi-finals, West Coast captain Chris Judd announced that he was leaving the club, and intended to return to a club in Melbourne for the remainder of his career. Aged 24, Judd was already a premiership captain, Brownlow Medallist, Norm Smith Medallist and Leigh Matthews Trophy winner with the Eagles, and was arguably the best player in the league at the time.

Judd met with four clubs – Carlton, Collingwood, Essendon and Melbourne – and on 2 October 2007, announced that Carlton was his preferred destination, leaving the clubs to negotiate the details of a trade. After informing West Coast early in negotiations that it would not be trading its number one draft pick for Judd, Carlton agreed to trade its first and second round draft picks (No. 3 and 20) and twenty-year-old key position prospect Josh Kennedy (a former No. 4 draft pick) for Judd and a third round draft pick (No. 46).

=== Delisting of Lance Whitnall ===
Shortly after trade week, Carlton made the decision to delist captain Lance Whitnall. Whitnall was only 28 years old, and had won the John Nicholls Medal only one season earlier in 2006, but the club was concerned that his degenerative knee injury would limit his output.

=== In ===
Player	Previous club	League	via
(Victoria (state)) Chris Judd	West Coast	AFL	AFL Trade Week, with pick No. 46, in exchange for Josh Kennedy and picks No. 3 and 20.
(Western Australia) Richard Hadley	Brisbane Lions	AFL	AFL Trade Week, in exchange for pick No. 52.
(Victoria (state)) Matthew Kreuzer	Northern Knights	TAC Cup	AFL National Draft, priority round (pick No. 1)
(Western Australia) Steven Browne	West Perth	WAFL	AFL National Draft, third round (pick No. 36)
(Western Australia) Dennis Armfield	Swan Districts	WAFL	AFL National Draft, third round (pick No. 46)
(South Australia) Darren Pfeiffer	Adelaide	AFL	AFL Pre-season Draft, first round (pick No. 2)
(Tasmania) Aaron Joseph	Tassie Mariners/Glenorchy	U18 C'ships/SFL	AFL Rookie Draft, first round (pick No. 2)
(Victoria (state)) Lachlan Hill	Oakleigh Chargers	TAC Cup	AFL Rookie Draft, second round (pick No. 18)
(Western Australia) David Ellard	Swan Districts	WAFL	AFL Rookie Draft, third round (pick No. 34)
(Republic of Ireland) Michael Shields	Cork GAA	GAA	Recruited on an international rookie contract during AFL Rookie Draft, fourth round (pick No. 48)

=== Out ===
Player	New Club	League	via
(Victoria (state)) Anthony Koutoufides			Retired from the AFL in late 2007
(Victoria (state)) Matthew Lappin	Carlton (ass't coach), Northern Bullants	AFL; VFL	Retired from the AFL
(Western Australia) Josh Kennedy	West Coast	AFL	AFL Trade Week, with picks No. 3 and 20, in exchange for Chris Judd and pick No. 46.
(Victoria (state)) Dylan McLaren	Port Melbourne	VFL	Delisted
(Victoria (state)) Lance Whitnall	Lalor	NFL	Delisted
(Victoria (state)) David Teague	Carlton (dev. coach); Northern Bullants (playing coach)	AFL; VFL	Delisted
(Victoria (state)) Anthony Raso	Frankston	VFL	Delisted
(Victoria (state)) Craig Flint	Mansfield	GVFL	Delisted
(Victoria (state)) Ross Young	Perth	WAFL	Delisted from the rookie list
(Republic of Ireland) Michael Shields	Cork GAA	GAA	Prior to Round 16, decided not to continue with Australian rules football, and returned to Ireland

== Season summary ==
=== Pre-season matches ===
Tour of South Africa

In late January and early February, the Carlton and Fremantle Football Clubs travelled to South Africa; both clubs held community camps on the tour to promote development of Australian rules football in South Africa, and the tour concluded with an exhibition match in Centurion.

**Date and local time**	**Opponent**	**Scores** (Carlton's scores indicated in **bold**)			**Venue**	**Attendance**
**Date and local time**	**Opponent**	Home	Away	Result	**Venue**	**Attendance**
Saturday, 2 February	Fremantle	**9.10 (64)**	11.12 (78)	Lost by 14 points Report	SuperSport Park, Centurion (N)	5,222

NAB Cup

The NAB Cup preseason competition was played as a sixteen-team knockout tournament in 2008. Carlton was eliminated in the quarter-finals.

**Round**	**Date and local time**	**Opponent**	**Scores** (Carlton's scores indicated in **bold**)			**Venue**	**Attendance**
**Round**	**Date and local time**	**Opponent**	Home	Away	Result	**Venue**	**Attendance**
1	Saturday, 16 February (5:40 pm)	Port Adelaide	0.12.13 (85)	**1.13.13 (100)**	Won by 15 points Report	AAMI Stadium (A)	9,133
2	Saturday, 23 February (7:10 pm)	Hawthorn	4.9.13 (103)	**4.3.15 (69)**	Lost by 34 points Report	Telstra Dome (A)	20,940

NAB Challenge

Following elimination from the NAB Cup, Carlton played two exhibition pre-season matches.

**Week**	**Date and local time**	**Opponent**	**Scores** (Carlton's scores indicated in **bold**)			**Venue**	**Attendance**
**Week**	**Date and local time**	**Opponent**	Home	Away	Result	**Venue**	**Attendance**
3	Friday, 29 February	West Coast	15.13 (103)	**9.8 (62)**	Lost by 41 points Report	Traeger Park, Alice Springs (N)	6,000 (approx.)
4	Friday, 7 March	Western Bulldogs	**13.15 (93)**	12.12 (84)	Won by 9 points Report	MC Labour Park (H)	10,000 (approx.)

=== Home-and-away season ===
**Round**	**Date and local time**	**Opponent**	**Scores** (Carlton's scores indicated in **bold**)			**Venue**	**Attendance**	**Ladder** **position**
**Round**	**Date and local time**	**Opponent**	Home	Away	Result	**Venue**	**Attendance**	**Ladder** **position**
1	Thursday, 20 March (6:10 pm)	Richmond	**11.13 (79)**	17.7 (109)	Lost by 30 points Report	Melbourne Cricket Ground (H)	72,552	14th
2	Saturday, 29 March (7:10 pm)	St Kilda	19.11 (125)	**12.13 (85)**	Lost by 40 points Report	Telstra Dome (A)	43,396	14th
3	Saturday, 5 April (7:10 pm)	Essendon	23.12 (150)	**21.8 (134)**	Lost by 16 points Report	Melbourne Cricket Ground (A)	64,388	14th
4	Sunday, 13 April (2:10 pm)	Collingwood	**17.9 (111)**	13.10 (88)	Won by 23 points Report	Melbourne Cricket Ground (H)	77,873	12th
5	Sunday, 20 April (1:10 pm)	Melbourne	9.14 (68)	**15.11 (101)**	Won by 33 points Report	Melbourne Cricket Ground (A)	44,759	11th
6	Saturday, 26 April (2:10 pm)	Adelaide	**11.15 (81)**	16.15 (111)	Lost by 30 points Report	Melbourne Cricket Ground (H)	41,033	11th
7	Friday, 2 May (6:40 pm)	West Coast	10.14 (74)	**17.9 (111)**	Won by 37 points Report	Subiaco Oval (A)	41,254	11th
8	Saturday, 17 May (7:10 pm)	Brisbane Lions	**12.20 (92)**	18.17 (125)	Lost by 33 points Report	Telstra Dome (H)	38,675	11th
9	Saturday, 24 May (2:10 pm)	Fremantle	**14.13 (97)**	14.4 (88)	Won by 9 points Report	Telstra Dome (H)	28,955	9th
10	Saturday, 31 May (7:10 pm)	Geelong	19.19 (133)	**12.5 (77)**	Lost by 56 points Report	Telstra Dome (A)	46,231	11th
11	Sunday, 8 June (4:10 pm)	Port Adelaide	8.15 (63)	**10.15 (75)**	Won by 12 points Report	AAMI Stadium (A)	29,240	10th
12	Sunday, 15 June (2:10 pm)	Collingwood	12.17 (89)	**17.17 (119)**	Won by 30 points Report	Melbourne Cricket Ground (A)	80,310	8th
13	Sunday, 22 June (2:10 pm)	Essendon	**15.11 (101)**	20.16 (136)	Lost by 35 points Report	Melbourne Cricket Ground (H)	59,177	10th
14	Saturday, 28 June (2:10 pm)	Richmond	12.16 (88)	**17.16 (118)**	Won by 30 points Report	Melbourne Cricket Ground (A)	73,503	9th
15	Friday, 11 July (7:40 pm)	St Kilda	**12.15 (87)**	18.11 (119)	Lost by 32 points Report	Melbourne Cricket Ground (H)	55,658	10th
16	Sunday, 20 July (1:10 pm)	Sydney	**18.11 (119)**	18.13 (121)	Lost by 2 points Report	Telstra Dome (H)	38,401	11th
17	Sunday, 27 July (4:40 pm)	Western Bulldogs	15.8 (98)	**18.18 (126)**	Won by 28 points Report	Telstra Dome (A)	37,879	11th
18	Saturday, 2 August (2:40 pm)	Adelaide	13.16 (94)	**12.14 (86)**	Lost by 8 points Report	AAMI Stadium (A)	40,730	11th
19	Saturday, 9 August (2:10 pm)	Port Adelaide	**18.24 (132)**	9.12 (66)	Won by 66 points Report	Telstra Dome (H)	29,696	10th
20	Sunday, 17 August (2:10 pm)	North Melbourne	**14.6 (90)**	22.9 (141)	Lost by 51 points Report	Telstra Dome (H)	43,406	11th
21	Saturday, 23 August (7:10 pm)	Brisbane Lions	16.13 (109)	**18.7 (115)**	Won by 6 points Report	The Gabba (A)	34,327	11th
22	Saturday, 30 August (7:10 pm)	Hawthorn	**12.9 (81)**	24.15 (159)	Lost by 78 points Report	Telstra Dome (H)	49,057	11th

== Ladder ==
2008 AFL ladder
Pos	Team	Pld	W	L	D	PF	PA	PP	Pts	
1	Geelong	22	21	1	0	2672	1651	161.8	84	Finals series
2	Hawthorn (P)	22	17	5	0	2434	1846	131.9	68	Finals series
3	Western Bulldogs	22	15	6	1	2506	2112	118.7	62	Finals series
4	St Kilda	22	13	9	0	2126	1923	110.6	52	Finals series
5	Adelaide	22	13	9	0	2017	1838	109.7	52	Finals series
6	Sydney	22	12	9	1	2095	1863	112.5	50	Finals series
7	North Melbourne	22	12	9	1	2121	2187	97.0	50	Finals series
8	Collingwood	22	12	10	0	2267	2038	111.2	48	Finals series
9	Richmond	22	11	10	1	2228	2288	97.4	46	
10	Brisbane	22	10	12	0	2156	2200	98.0	40	
11	Carlton	22	10	12	0	2217	2354	94.2	40	
12	Essendon	22	8	14	0	2130	2608	81.7	32	
13	Port Adelaide	22	7	15	0	2118	2208	95.9	28	
14	Fremantle	22	6	16	0	1988	2121	93.7	24	
15	West Coast	22	4	18	0	1670	2535	65.9	16	
16	Melbourne	22	3	19	0	1629	2602	62.6	12	

Source: AFL ladder
Rules for classification: 1) points; 2) percentage; 3) number of points for.
(P) Premiers

== Leading Goalkickers ==
Brendan Fevola was Carlton's leading goalkicker for 2008, kicking 99 goals for the season. It was the sixth consecutive time that Fevola won the club goalkicking. The 99-goal tally was the highest of Fevola's career, but it was not enough to win the Coleman Medal, with Hawthorn's Lance Franklin kicking 102 goals in the home-and-away season.

Fevola's tally of 99 goals the highest season tally for Carlton history since Alex Jesaulenko's 115 goals in the 1970 season. In addition to his 99 goals at premiership level, Fevola kicked six goals for Victoria in the AFL Hall of Fame Tribute Match.

Player	Goals	Behinds
Brendan Fevola	99	51
Brad Fisher	25	22
Eddie Betts	25	10
Nick Stevens	17	6
Chris Judd	15	9

== Team awards and records ==
Game records

- Round 3 – Carlton's score of 21.8 (134) was its highest losing score since Round 3, 1985.
- Round 4 – Carlton's win against Collingwood was its first win since Round 11, 2007, ending a fourteen-match losing streak. The losing streak was the equal-longest in club history, matching a fourteen-game losing streak in 1901–1902.
- Round 4 – Carlton restricted Collingwood to 13.10 (88), ending a streak of twenty-four consecutive matches in which it had conceded at least 100 points. It was the second-longest such streak by any club in VFL/AFL history, one game short of Sydney's twenty-five game streak from 1992 to 1993.
- Round 7 – Carlton's win against West Coast was its first win outside Victoria since Round 11, 2004, breaking an eighteen-game winless streak which included one draw.
- Round 9 – Carlton defeated Fremantle for the first time since Round 16, 2001, ending a nine-match losing streak against the Dockers.
- Round 11 – Carlton recovered from a 30-point deficit at three quarter time to defeat Port Adelaide by 12 points. It was Carlton's largest successful comeback from a three-quarter time deficit since Round 4, 1944, and at that time its equal largest ever.
- Round 21 – Carlton recovered from a 32-point deficit at three quarter time to defeat Brisbane Lions by six points. This set a new club record for the largest successful comeback from a three-quarter time deficit.
- Round 21 - Carlton defeated Brisbane for the first time since Round 8, 2001, ending an eight-match losing streak against the Lions.

Season records

- Carlton's total score (2217 points) and percentage (94.2%) were both the best that the club had achieved since the 2001 season.
- Carlton failed to reach the VFL/AFL finals for the seventh consecutive season, breaking its club record of six seasons, set from 1897 to 1902.

Other

- Round 4 – Carlton won the 2009 Peter Mac Cup with its win over Collingwood.

== Notable events ==
Brendan Fevola stood down from the leadership group

On 16 March, less than a week before the opening match of the season, an intoxicated Brendan Fevola was caught urinating outside a Melbourne nightclub. The club demoted Fevola from its leadership group – into which he had been elevated two months earlier – fined him $10,000, and put him on formal notice that no further alcohol-related off-field indiscretion would be tolerated; this ultimatum was ultimately enacted following the 2009 season, when he was traded to Brisbane Lions following drunken behaviour at that season's Brownlow Medal Count.

Round 22 – Lance Franklin and Brendan Fevola both within reach of 100 goals

Entering the final round match between Carlton and Hawthorn, both Carlton's Brendan Fevola and Hawthorn's Lance Franklin had the opportunity to kick 100 goals for the season, a feat that no player had reached inside the home-and-away season since 1998. Franklin entered the match with 98 goals, and Fevola with 92 goals.

Franklin reached his 100th goal in the 25th minute of the first quarter, sparking the traditional pitch invasion which delayed play for eight minutes. Fevola was goalless in the first half of the game, scoring two behinds from four opportunities, but then kicked seven of Carlton's eight second-half goals to bring his final tally to 99. Hawthorn had built a game-winning lead by half time, so most of the play in the second half involved Carlton contriving to deliver the ball only to Fevola, and Hawthorn defending him with multiple players.

Prior to that match, Nick Stevens had received a death threat from a man who claimed that he would stab Stevens during the pitch invasion which would follow Franklin's 100th goal; Stevens had received death threats from the man previously, but this was the first one which described a specific threat. Ground security surrounded Stevens during the pitch invasion, and the invasion passed without incident. In 2009, the threats against Stevens – as well as other threats against Andrew McLeod (Adelaide), Scott Lucas (Essendon) and Nathan Thompson (North Melbourne) – were traced to Eric Rundle; he was found guilty of stalking in May 2009, and was sentenced to 26 months jail.

== Individual awards and records ==
=== John Nicholls Medal ===
The Carlton Football Club Best and Fairest awards night took place on 11 September. The John Nicholls Medal, for the best and fairest player of the club, as well as several other awards, were presented on the night.

John Nicholls Medal

A new voting system was introduced for the John Nicholls Medal starting from this year. In each match, as in 2007, the five members of the Match Committee awarded votes; however, starting from this year, each committee member could award votes to up to eight players, and each player could receive up to ten votes from each judge; in previous years, each voter awarded five votes to the best player, four votes to the second-best player, and so on down to one vote for the fifth-best player. The player with the most total votes across all premiership season matches wins the award.

The winner of the John Nicholls Medal was Chris Judd, who polled 472 votes. Judd won the medal in his first season at the club, and it was the first of three John Nicholls Medals that Judd would win consecutively from 2008 to 2010. Judd won comfortably ahead of Marc Murphy (417 votes) and Brendan Fevola (373 votes). The top ten is given below.

Pos.	Player	Votes
1st	Chris Judd	472
2nd	Marc Murphy	417
3rd	Brendan Fevola	373
4th	Andrew Carrazzo	316
5th	Bryce Gibbs	288
6th	Nick Stevens	287
7th	Jarrad Waite	267
8th	Kade Simpson	202
9th	Heath Scotland	201
10th	Bret Thornton	197

Other awards

The following other awards were presented on John Nicholls Medal night:

- Best First-Year Player – Matthew Kreuzer
- Best Clubman – Andrew Carrazzo
- Past Players Encouragement Award – Shaun Grigg
- Women of Carlton Player Ambassador of the Year Award – Michael Jamison

=== Other awards ===
AFLPA Awards

Chris Judd finished in fifth place in the Leigh Matthews Trophy for 2008.

All-Australian Team

The 40-man squad for the All-Australian Team was announced on 2 September 2008, and the final team of 22 was announced on 15 September 2008. Chris Judd and Brendan Fevola were Carlton's only two nominees, and both were named in the final team, and Judd was named as captain.

- Brendan Fevola (forward pocket)
- Chris Judd (ruck rover, captain)

AFL Rising Star

Two Carlton players were nominated for the AFL Rising Star award in 2008:

- Matthew Kreuzer – Round 11
- Shaun Grigg – Round 19

Kreuzer ultimately polled eleven votes to finish fourth for the award.

Representative honours

The following Carlton players were selected for representative teams during the 2008 season.

- In the AFL Hall of Fame Tribute Match, for Victoria: Brendan Fevola, Chris Judd, Jarrad Waite
- In the 2008 International Rules Series, for Australia: Marc Murphy, Kade Simpson

Australian Football Hall of Fame

Alex Jesaulenko, who played 256 games and won four premierships with Carlton between 1967 and 1979, was elevated to the status of Legend in the Australian Football Hall of Fame.

Other

- Brendan Fevola won the Allen Aylett Medal as the best on ground in the AFL Hall of Fame Tribute Match.
- Kade Simpson won the Jim Stynes Medal as Australia's best player in the 2008 International Rules Series.

== Northern Bullants ==
The Carlton Football Club had a full affiliation with the Northern Bullants during the 2008 season. It was the sixth season of the clubs' affiliation, which had been in place since 2003. Carlton senior- and rookie-listed players who were not selected to play in the Carlton team were eligible to play for either the Northern Bullants seniors or reserves team, including both Victorian Football League matches. Home games were shared between the Bullants' traditional home ground, Preston City Oval, and Carlton's traditional home ground, Visy Park. Carlton development coach David Teague was appointed as the playing senior coach for the Bullants for the season.

The Bullants finished eighth out of thirteen in the VFL, after being defeated in the elimination final by Casey by five points. Carlton listed player Jason Saddington, who played two games at AFL level during the season, won the Laurie Hill Trophy as the Bullants' best and fairest.
