= Bryce Gibbs (Australian rules footballer) =

Australian rules footballer (born 1989)

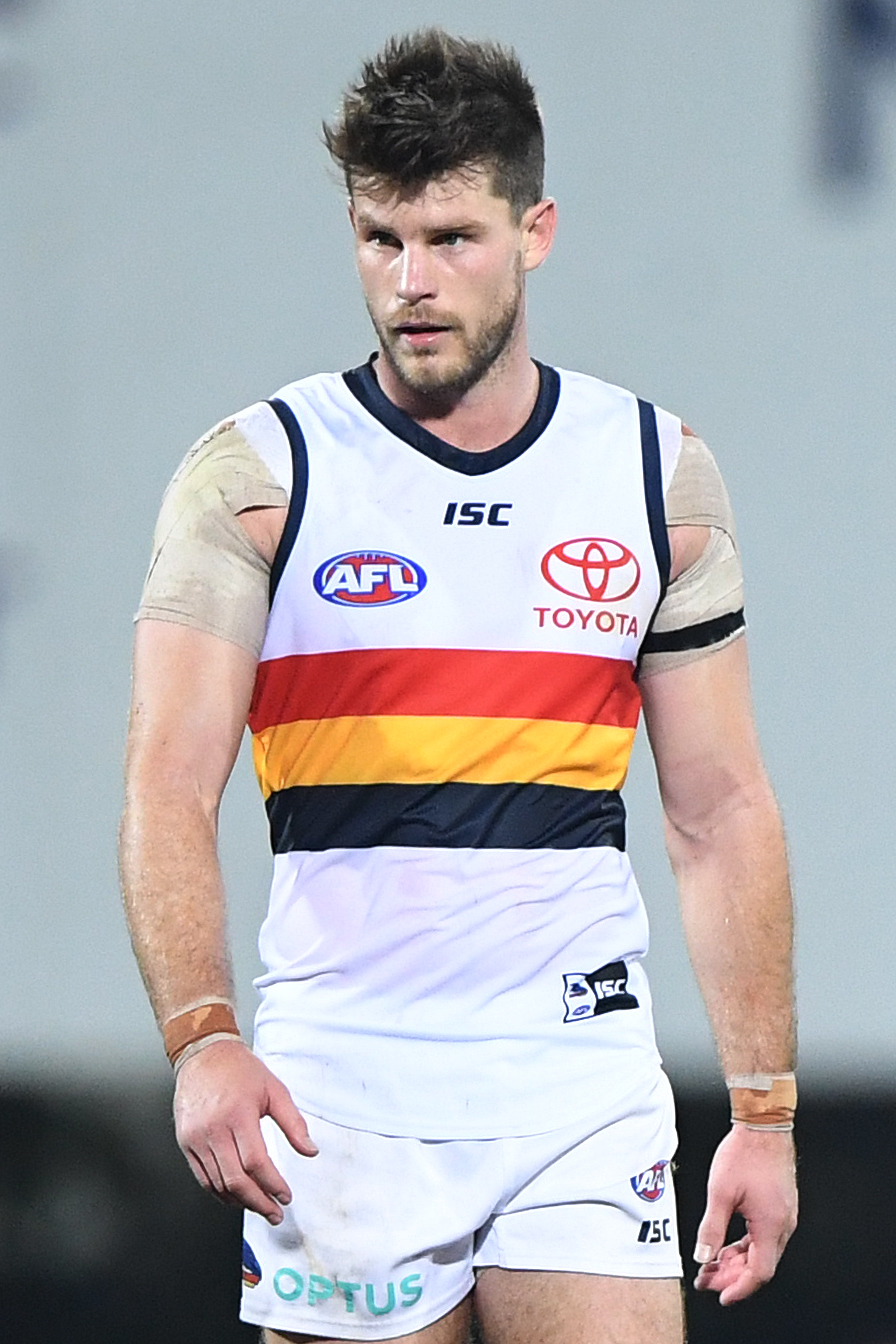
- Gibbs in June 2019

Personal information
- Full name: Bryce Gibbs
- Born: 15 March 1989 (age 37); Adelaide, South Australia
- Original team: Plympton (SA)/Glenelg (SANFL)
- Draft: No. 1, 2006 national draft
- Height: 188 cm (6 ft 2 in)
- Weight: 85 kg (187 lb)
- Position: Midfield

Playing career^{1}
Years	Club	Games (Goals)
2007–2017	Carlton	231 (137)
2018–2020	Adelaide	37 (15)
Total		268 (152)

International team honours^{2}
Years	Team	Games (Goals)
2010	Australia	2
- ^{1} Playing statistics correct to the end of 2019.^{2} Representative statistics correct as of 2010.

Career highlights
- 2007 AFL Rising Star nomination; Fox Footy Longest Kick winner (and record holder): 2016; Carlton Best First Year Player: 2007; John Nicholls Medal: 2014; Magarey Medal: 2021 (SANFL)

Bryce Gibbs (born 15 March 1989) is a retired professional Australian rules footballer who played for the Carlton Football Club and the Adelaide Football Club in the Australian Football League (AFL).

== Pre-AFL ==
Gibbs was an exceptional youth talent, which led to much speculation about his ultimate AFL drafting. In 2004 he won Glenelg's Under-17s best and fairest award despite spending part of the season playing SANFL reserve grade. That year he also captained the South Australian under-16s team at the national championships.

From Round 7 of the 2005 season, at age 16, he debuted in Glenelg's League team and was a regular until the end of the 2006 season. Playing as a teenager against grown men in the SANFL, Gibbs excelled, coming third in the club's 2006 best and fairest and dominating recent former AFL players during the season.

He featured prominently in the 2006 under-18 national championships, where he was captain of South Australia. He was selected as the Under-18 All-Australian ruck-rover and was judged South Australia's Most Valuable Player. He also co-captained the Australian youth side against an Irish youth side in an international tournament in Australia in 2006.

== Recruitment ==
Speculation that Gibbs would be the No. 1 draft pick began early in the 2006 season. Although his father Ross Gibbs had a 253-game career with Glenelg, Bryce was ineligible to be taken by the Adelaide Crows under the father–son rule, much to the Crows' chagrin, because Ross had not yet played 200 of those games before the Crows entered the Australian Football League in 1991.

When Essendon and Carlton met in Round 16 of 2006, the sides were firmly entrenched at the bottom of the ladder, with Carlton having lost its last seven games and Essendon a then-club-record fourteen. Speculation that the result would decide the wooden spoon (and hence the first draft pick) led to the game jokingly being dubbed the "Bryce Gibbs Cup" by some in the media. The match ended in a draw.

Carlton ultimately finished last, and subsequently selected Gibbs with the first overall pick in the 2006 AFL draft (held on 25 November 2006). He was given the No. 4 guernsey, formerly worn by club champion and administrator (and later, president), Stephen Kernahan, who was also a close friend and former Glenelg teammate of Gibbs' father.

== AFL career ==
Gibbs was named in Carlton's leadership group for Carlton's 2007 season without having played a single AFL match, which is the first time in history this has happened.

He made his debut in round one against Richmond and kicked a goal with his first kick while becoming the 1100th player to play for Carlton. Seventeen disposals at 100 percent efficiency and a great shutdown role on Brownlow Medallist Jason Akermanis in round 10 earned Gibbs his nomination for the NAB Rising Star award.

Gibbs played every game of the 2007 season and kicked five goals. Most of his development and experience was in the backline, where he has played as a half-back flanker.

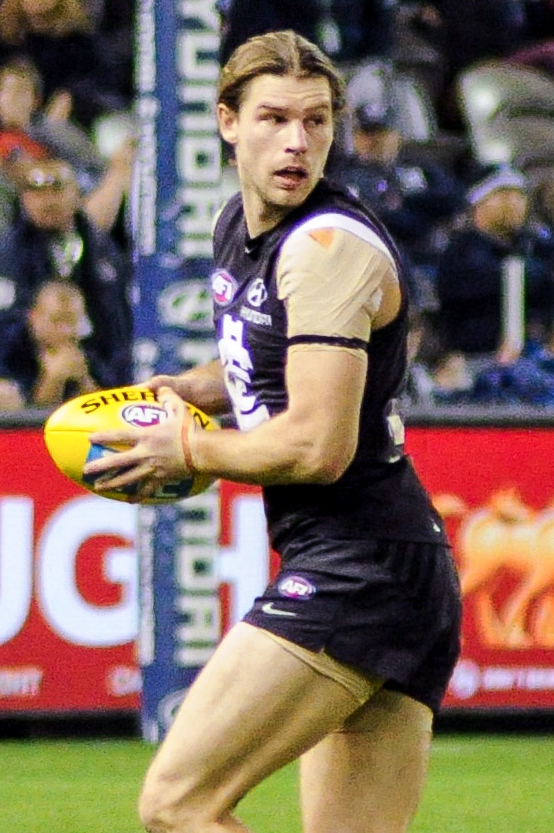
Gibbs in 2017

In 2008, new coach Brett Ratten reduced the size of the leadership group, and Gibbs was excluded from the new group. Gibbs played games as both an attacking midfielder and as a tagger throughout the season, playing very well in both roles. As a tagger, he convincingly beat several top-class opponents, including Chad Cornes (nine disposals), Heath Shaw (six disposals) and Adam Goodes, whom he held to seven disposals while collecting 26 of his own. In the midfield, he showed strong team ethic, very accurate disposal by foot, strong tackling, and very good football smarts and awareness. He collected seven Brownlow votes during the season and finished 5th in the club best and fairest.

In 2009, Gibbs began playing mainly as an attacking midfielder, and much less as a tagger. He finished the season with a total of 615 disposals (averaging 26.7) which was ranked ninth in the league, and polled 15 votes in the Brownlow Medal to finish equal ninth, and finished third in the club best and fairest.

In 2010, Gibbs began to divide his time between the midfield and the half-back line, playing as a rebounding defender. In round 10, his 45 disposals tied Greg Williams' efforts as the most by a Carlton player in a single game (since records were kept in 1984). Gibbs finished fourth in the club best and fairest for 2010.

In 2011, Gibbs celebrated his 100 games for Carlton against the Brisbane Lions.

In June 2012, Gibbs re-signed with Carlton for a further two years.

In June 2014, Gibbs signed a new five-year deal with Carlton, keeping him at the club until the end of the 2019 season. He went on to win his first John Nicholls Medal and was also named in the All Australian 40-man squad.

Despite being contracted to Carlton, Gibbs announced at the conclusion of the 2016 season that he wanted to return to South Australia for family reasons and requested a trade. After failing to facilitate a trade with the Adelaide Football Club, he stayed with Carlton. It was also in 2016 that he kicked 72.3 metres (237 ft) in the Fox Footy Longest Kick to win the competition and $10,000 as prize money. The distance remains the record as of the end of 2023.

Carlton and Adelaide re-entered trade talks during the 2017 AFL trade season and finalised a trade to send Gibbs to Adelaide.

Gibbs announced his retirement on 10 September 2020 and played his final AFL game in a match between Adelaide and Carlton on 13 September 2020.

== Statistics ==
Statistics are correct to end of the 2019 season

Legend
G	Goals	K	Kicks	D	Disposals	T	Tackles
B	Behinds	H	Handballs	M	Marks

Season	Team	No.	Games	Totals							Averages (per game)						
Season	Team	No.	Games	G	B	K	H	D	M	T	G	B	K	H	D	M	T
2007	Carlton	4	22	5	6	166	120	286	94	62	0.2	0.3	7.6	5.5	13.0	4.3	2.8
2008	Carlton	4	21	14	3	242	193	435	118	73	0.7	0.1	11.5	9.2	20.7	5.6	3.5
2009	Carlton	4	23	15	8	321	294	615	141	92	0.7	0.4	14.0	12.8	26.7	6.1	4.0
2010	Carlton	4	23	6	11	342	218	560	127	82	0.3	0.5	14.9	9.5	24.6	5.5	3.6
2011	Carlton	4	23	21	18	381	167	548	174	82	0.9	0.8	16.6	7.3	23.8	7.6	3.6
2012	Carlton	4	22	8	9	317	164	481	114	91	0.4	0.4	14.4	7.5	21.9	5.2	4.1
2013	Carlton	4	21	11	6	302	167	469	92	75	0.5	0.3	14.4	8.0	22.3	4.4	3.6
2014	Carlton	4	22	18	15	308	237	545	89	108	0.8	0.7	14.0	10.8	24.8	4.1	4.9
2015	Carlton	4	10	4	5	112	97	209	21	54	0.0	0.5	11.2	9.7	20.9	2.1	5.4
2016	Carlton	4	22	18	12	320	270	590	77	114	0.8	0.6	14.6	12.3	26.8	3.5	5.2
2017	Carlton	4	22	17	13	362	228	590	114	129	0.8	0.6	16.5	10.4	26.8	5.2	5.9
2018	Adelaide	6	22	13	15	354	215	569	82	118	0.6	0.7	16.1	9.8	25.9	3.7	5.4
2019	Adelaide	6	12	2	1	154	84	238	48	47	0.2	0.1	16.1	12.8	19.8	4	3.9
Career			265	246	122	3681	2454	6135	1291	1127	0.6	0.5	13.9	9.3	23.2	4.9	4.3

== Personal life ==
Gibbs is the son of former SANFL and WAFL player Ross Gibbs.

He completed his schooling at Brighton Secondary School, graduating in 2006 after undertaking his South Australian Certificate of Education (SACE).

Away from football, Gibbs co‑founded the clothing label Tushay Clothing with former Carlton and Collingwood player Jordan Russell. Gibbs, along with team-mate Nick Stevens, appeared in the popular Australian drama Neighbours in October 2008. He has represented South Australia in volleyball.

Gibbs and his partner, Lauren Tscharke, have three children: sons Charlie and Bailey, and daughter Madison.
