= Ross Gibbs =

Australian rules footballer

Personal information
- Full name: Ross Gibbs
- Born: 16 February 1960 (age 66)
- Original team: Mirrabooka
- Height: 175 cm (5 ft 9 in)
- Weight: 74 kg (163 lb)
- Positions: Back pocket, ruck-rover

Playing career^{1}
Years	Club	Games (Goals)
1979–1983	West Perth	97 (-)
1984–1994	Glenelg	253 (111)
- ^{1} Playing statistics correct to the end of 1994.

Ross Gibbs is a former Australian rules footballer who played for West Perth in the West Australian Football League (WAFL) and Glenelg in the South Australian National Football League (SANFL).

A dual Western Australian interstate representative, Gibbs could play as a ruck-rover or in defence. He transferred to Glenelg in 1984 and was a back pocket in their premiership sides the following two seasons. Gibbs toured Ireland in 1987 with the Australian international rules football team.

His son, Bryce, was taken by Carlton with the first pick of the 2006 AFL draft. Had Bryce's father reached the 200 game milestone for Glenelg before Adelaide were admitted into the AFL in 1991, then the Crows could have recruited him under the father–son rule.

Gibbs was inducted into the Glenelg Hall of Fame in 2006.
