= Adam Bentick =

Australian rules footballer (born 1985)

Personal information
- Born: 13 June 1985 (age 41); Victoria
- Original team: Calder Cannons
- Debut: Round 18, 31 July 2004, Carlton vs. Fremantle, at Optus Oval
- Height: 184 cm (6 ft 0 in)
- Weight: 83 kg (183 lb)

Playing career^{1}
Years	Club	Games (Goals)
2004–2008	Carlton	68 (13)
- ^{1} Playing statistics correct to the end of 2008.

Career highlights
- AFL Rising Star award: Nominee 2005

Adam Bentick (born 13 June 1985) is an Australian rules footballer who played for the Carlton Football Club in the Australian Football League (AFL).

Bentick played for two years in Victoria's top under-18s competition, the TAC Cup for the Calder Cannons. In that time, he established himself as a promising mid-fielder who was particularly good at roving the hit-outs and getting a quick kick out of the packs. Calder dominated the TAC Cup through these years, and under Bentick's captaincy won the 2003 premiership.

Despite captaining the premiers and averaging 20 disposals per game in the TAC Cup, Bentick was passed over in the 2003 National Draft. He was eventually picked up as a rookie by Carlton in the rookie draft.

Bentick played most of 2004 in Carlton's VFL-affiliate, the Northern Bullants. He made a strong impression in the VFL, and was elevated to the senior list late in the season. He played the final five games for 2004, debuting at Optus Oval against the Fremantle Dockers.

Bentick began 2005 in the Bullants, and was re-elevated to the seniors in Round 8, playing for four weeks, including the Round 9 Optus Oval farewell game against Melbourne. He was dropped after Round 11. His recall to the seniors in Round 18 heralded his permanent position in the team. Given the midfield role he relished, he amassed a high number of possessions, as well as a strong tackling game which could not be ignored. In Round 20 against Collingwood, Bentick's twelfth game, he amassed 34 disposals and 5 tackles. This eye-catching performance earned him an AFL Rising Star award nomination, as well as three Brownlow Medal votes.

Bentick was a regular in the team for the next three years. He played the first twenty games of the 2006 season, before missing the final two with a shoulder injury, and played another twenty games in 2007 and fourteen in 2008. He developed into one of the club's most important inside midfielders, adept at winning the hard ball and tackling, a style reminiscent of Brett Ratten, (who was both an assistant coach, and later the head coach, during Bentick's time at Carlton, and whose #7 guernsey Bentick adopted in 2007). Bentick's career-best disposal haul of 36 came in Round 21, 2007 against the Kangaroos, allowing Bentick to achieve the rare feat of earning a Brownlow Medal vote in an 82-point loss. At the time he was delisted, his career average of 5.0 tackles per game was amongst the highest in VFL/AFL history.

Bentick was injured for most of the 2009 season. He played the latter part of the season with the Bullants, including their grand final loss against North Ballarat, but did not play a game for Carlton. Bentick was delisted by Carlton at the end of the 2009 season.

After being delisted, Bentick played three seasons (2010–2012) with the Port Melbourne Football Club in the VFL, and then shifted to St Bernard's in the Victorian Amateur Football Association in 2013. Bentick captained the VAFA in representative football in 2014, and was joint-winner of the 2015 Woodrow Medal as the VAFA Premier Division Best and Fairest.
