= Mark Austin (footballer) =

Australian rules footballer (born 1989)

Personal information
- Full name: Mark Austin
- Born: 24 February 1989 (age 37)
- Original team: Glenelg (SANFL)
- Draft: No. 35, 2006 National Draft, Carlton; No. 76, 2012 Rookie Draft, Western Bulldogs
- Height: 193 cm (6 ft 4 in)
- Weight: 95 kg (209 lb)
- Position: Defender

Playing career^{1}
Years	Club	Games (Goals)
2007–2011	Carlton	15 (1)
2012–2014	Western Bulldogs	29 (1)
Total		44 (2)
- ^{1} Playing statistics correct to the end of 2014.

Mark Austin (born 24 February 1989) is an Australian rules footballer who played for the Carlton Football Club and Western Bulldogs in the Australian Football League (AFL). Austin played two senior games for the Glenelg Tigers in the 2006 South Australian National Football League (SANFL) season, and was subsequently selected in the 2006 AFL National Draft in the third round (35th pick overall) by Carlton, who also selected school friend and Glenelg teammate Bryce Gibbs in the same draft.

Throughout the first two seasons of his career, Austin played primarily with Carlton's VFL-affiliate, the Northern Bullants. He made his AFL debut in the final round of the 2007 season. He temporarily became a regular in Carlton's defence during 2009, playing as the third tall defender, although often against taller opponents, as Carlton's defenders were hit by injury in 2009; however, he also succumbed to injury in the latter part of that season, missing the last few rounds of the year and much of the pre-season. In 2010 and 2011, Austin played almost exclusively with the Northern Bullants, and played his 50th game for the VFL club in late 2010; he managed only one game for Carlton over those two years, and was delisted at the end of the 2011 season.

Austin was granted a second chance at AFL level when he was the last player selected by the Western Bulldogs in the 2012 Rookie Draft (76th pick overall).

Austin was delisted at the conclusion of the 2014 AFL season. He will play for Essendon District Football League club Aberfeldie in 2015.
