= Adam Hartlett =

Australian rules footballer (born 1986)

Personal information
- Born: 22 April 1986 (age 40)
- Original team: West Adelaide(SANFL)/Edwardstown
- Debut: 26 May 2007, Carlton vs. Adelaide, at Telstra Dome
- Height: 196 cm (6 ft 5 in)
- Weight: 94 kg (207 lb)

Playing career^{1}
Years	Club	Games (Goals)
2007–2009	Carlton	11 (2)
- ^{1} Playing statistics correct to the end of 2009.

Career highlights
- West Adelaide premiership player (2015)

Adam Hartlett (born 22 April 1986) is an Australian rules footballer who played for Carlton in the Australian Football League (AFL).

After graduating from Sacred Heart College in 2003, Hartlett was recruited as the number 25 draft pick in the 2004 AFL draft from West Adelaide by the Carlton Football Club. Hartlett played for Carlton's VFL-affiliate, the Northern Bullants, in both reserves and seniors through 2005 and 2006, suffering several injury setbacks. Following strong performances with the Bullants seniors in early 2007, he made his debut for Carlton in Round 9. He was a member of the Bullants' losing grand final team in 2009. His brother, Hamish, is a former player for Port Adelaide.

Hartlett has played both back and forward in key positions, both with the Bullants and Blues. However, his development and career were hampered by recurring hamstring injuries. He was delisted by the Blues at the end of the 2009 season , and returned to West Adelaide in 2010. Hartlett went onto become the senior coach of the West Adelaide Football Club.
