= David Ellard =

Australian rules footballer

Personal information
- Full name: David Ellard
- Born: 13 March 1989 (age 37)
- Original team: Swan Districts (WAFL)
- Draft: No. 34, 2008 Rookie Draft, Carlton; No. 99, 2010 National Draft, rookie elevation
- Height: 177 cm (5 ft 10 in)
- Weight: 78 kg (172 lb)
- Position: Midfielder / forward

Playing career^{1}
| Years | Club | Games (Goals) |
| 2008–2015 | Carlton | 63 (37) |
- ^{1} Playing statistics correct to the end of 2015.

David Ellard (born 13 March 1989) is a former professional Australian rules footballer who played for the Carlton Football Club in the Australian Football League (AFL).

Ellard is a relatively small player who plays mainly as an in-and-under or tagging midfielder. He played football with the Swan Districts Football Club in the WAFL in 2007. He was drafted to the Carlton Football Club in the AFL for the 2008 season as a rookie in the rookie draft, with the club's third selection (No. 34 overall). Ellard played in several of Carlton's pre-season games, including his Carlton debut in an exhibition match in South Africa, and in the club's two NAB Cup games.

Ellard began the regular season with Carlton's VFL-affiliate, the Northern Bullants. He impressed sufficiently to be elevated to the senior list and made his debut against the West Coast Eagles at Subiaco Oval in Round 7. He did not play again for the Blues during the season, playing a total of eighteen games for the Bullants. In 2009, Ellard returned to the rookie list, and played the entire season with the Northern Bullants, where he was one of the club's best midfielders, and was a part of the club's losing grand final team. Ellard won the Carlton Football Club's Best Clubman award and the Northern Bullants' Best and Fairest award (the Laurie Hill Trophy) in 2009.

Ellard was given a third year as a rookie, and continued playing for the Bullants. After playing his 50th senior game for the Bullants, and more than two years after his AFL debut, Ellard played his second AFL match in Round 17, 2010, against the West Coast Eagles at Subiaco Oval, and played every Carlton game for the rest of the season. Ellard was formally elevated to the senior list after the 2010 season, and was a regular part of Carlton's midfield in 2011, playing a career-high 19 games for the season with strong tackling and accurate goalkicking. After struggling with injuries in 2013, he returned to a lead-up forward role and remained in that role for the rest of his time with Carlton.

Ellard retired from AFL football after the 2015 season, finishing with 63 games over eight seasons with Carlton. He played the 2016 season for Greensborough in Northern Football League, then returned to Perth and served as co-captain at Swan Districts from 2017 until 2019 before retiring.

Ellard is the cousin of Alex Rance.

== Statistics ==
Legend
| G | Goals | K | Kicks | D | Disposals | T | Tackles |
| B | Behinds | H | Handballs | M | Marks |

| Season | Team | No. | Games | Totals | | | | | | | Averages (per game) | | | | | | |
| Season | Team | No. | Games | G | B | K | H | D | M | T | G | B | K | H | D | M | T |
|---|---|---|---|---|---|---|---|---|---|---|---|---|---|---|---|---|---|
| 2008 | Carlton | 46 | 1 | 1 | 0 | 4 | 0 | 4 | 2 | 0 | 1.0 | 0.0 | 4.0 | 0.0 | 4.0 | 2.0 | 0.0 |
| 2009 | Carlton | 46 | 0 | — | — | — | — | — | — | — | — | — | — | — | — | — | — |
| 2010 | Carlton | 46 | 7 | 2 | 4 | 52 | 40 | 92 | 17 | 51 | 0.3 | 0.6 | 7.4 | 5.7 | 13.1 | 2.4 | 7.3 |
| 2011 | Carlton | 46 | 19 | 15 | 7 | 162 | 116 | 278 | 59 | 115 | 0.8 | 0.4 | 8.5 | 6.1 | 14.6 | 3.1 | 6.1 |
| 2012 | Carlton | 46 | 10 | 4 | 8 | 114 | 72 | 186 | 34 | 56 | 0.4 | 0.8 | 11.4 | 7.2 | 18.6 | 3.4 | 5.6 |
| 2013 | Carlton | 46 | 3 | 0 | 0 | 19 | 11 | 30 | 4 | 17 | 0.0 | 0.0 | 6.3 | 3.7 | 10.0 | 1.3 | 5.7 |
| 2014 | Carlton | 46 | 13 | 11 | 9 | 84 | 58 | 142 | 34 | 62 | 0.8 | 0.7 | 6.5 | 4.5 | 10.9 | 2.6 | 4.8 |
| 2015 | Carlton | 46 | 10 | 4 | 3 | 55 | 47 | 102 | 24 | 32 | 0.4 | 0.3 | 5.5 | 4.7 | 10.2 | 2.4 | 3.2 |
| Career | | | 63 | 37 | 31 | 490 | 344 | 834 | 174 | 333 | 0.6 | 0.5 | 7.8 | 5.5 | 13.2 | 2.8 | 5.3 |
