= Steven Browne =

Australian rules footballer

Personal information
- Born: 1 February 1989 (age 37); Perth, Western Australia
- Original team: West Perth (WAFL)
- Debut: 26 April 2008, Carlton Football Club vs. Adelaide Football Club, at the MCG
- Height: 180 cm (5 ft 11 in)
- Weight: 78 kg (172 lb)

Playing career^{1}
Years	Club	Games (Goals)
2008–2010	Carlton	23 (6)
- ^{1} Playing statistics correct to the end of 2010.

Career highlights
- WAFL Premiership Player (2013)

Steven Browne (born 1 February 1989) is an Australian rules footballer who played for the Carlton Football Club in the Australian Football League (AFL) from 2008–2010. He later played for West Perth in the West Australian Football League (WAFL).

== Career ==
Browne played his junior football with the Whitford Junior Football Club in Western Australia. He played six games of senior football with West Perth as an eighteen-year-old in late 2007, and represented Western Australia in the NAB Under-18s Championship. He was selected by the Carlton Football Club in the 2007 AFL National Draft with a third round draft selection (#36 overall). He plays primarily as a rebounding half-backman who can rotate into the midfield.

Browne made his AFL debut in the sixth round of the 2008 season against Adelaide at the MCG, and played thirteen games for the season. He played seven games with Carlton in the 2009 season, spending much of the rest of the time with Carlton's VFL-affiliate, the Northern Bullants, where he played in the club's losing grand final. He managed just three games in 2010, and was delisted at the end of the season.

He returned to Western Australia, and to his old club West Perth, in 2011. He won a premiership with the club in 2013, and played there until 2016, finishing his WAFL career with 135 senior games for the club.
