= Simon Wiggins =

Australian rules footballer

Personal information
- Born: 11 September 1982 (age 44)
- Original team: Glenorchy / Tassie Mariners
- Debut: Round 5, 28 April 2001, Carlton vs. St Kilda, at Optus Oval
- Height: 187 cm (6 ft 2 in)
- Weight: 88 kg (194 lb)

Playing career^{1}
Years	Club	Games (Goals)
2001–2010	Carlton	116 (36)
- ^{1} Playing statistics correct to the end of 2010.

Career highlights
- Carlton leadership group, 2010.; Carlton Pre-season premiership side 2005.; Carlton Pre-season premiership side 2007.; Carlton Football Club Life Member.; Robert Rose Award nominee, 2008-2009.

Simon Wiggins (born 11 September 1982) is a former Australian rules footballer who played in the Australian Football League (AFL).

He was recruited as the number 15 draft pick in the 2000 AFL draft from Glenorchy. He made his debut for the Carlton Football Club in Round 5, 2001 against St Kilda.

Wiggins has battled with injury and form at his time at Carlton. He only played six games in his debut season, and has never managed to play a full season since suffering knee, shoulder and hamstring injuries as well as some slumps in form. He broke into the Blues' lineup for the last month of the 2005 season.

Wiggins is one of the few survivors from the club's 1999–2001 horror recruiting period, despite suffering from severe leg injuries throughout his time on Carlton's list. The faith shown in him has been repaid, with solid form shown midway through the 2006 season, in a role as a marking forward (similar to Aaron Hamill), both in leading and tall roles. He typically plays beyond the 50 m arc, setting up attacks rather than finishing them which was illustrated in 2008 where he ranked highly for goal assists in the competition. He played fourteen games in 2006, with some quality performances amongst some forgettable outings.

After playing several games as a half-forward in 2008 Wiggins reached his 100th game in round 17, kicking a career high four goals to help Carlton beat the highly fancied Western Bulldogs. In 2009, he continued to impress with his hardness at the ball and solid marking ability, but injury saw him miss the middle part of the season. Upon return, Wiggins was called upon to fill a hole in Carlton's injury-depleted backline, and he proved to be equally effective in the role. In 2010, he was elevated to the club's leadership group, but his season was hampered by injuries, managing ten VFL games, but none in the AFL. He retired from the AFL at the end of 2010. In the following years, he played for Sunshine in the Western Region Football League in 2011 and 2013, and for Airport West in the Essendon District Football League in 2012, where he won a Division 1 premiership.

He is the brother of former AFL player Patrick Wiggins (with whom he now plays at Sunshine) and is married to Australian diver, Loudy Wiggins. He is nicknamed "The Chief" due to his last name's similarity to that of bumbling policeman Chief Clancy Wiggum from the American animated sitcom The Simpsons. Amongst his teammates, he was one of the more popular players at the club and was regarded as the most courageous on field, as he was the club's nominee for the Robert Rose Award in both 2008 and 2009.
