= Jordan Russell =

Australian rules footballer (born 1986)

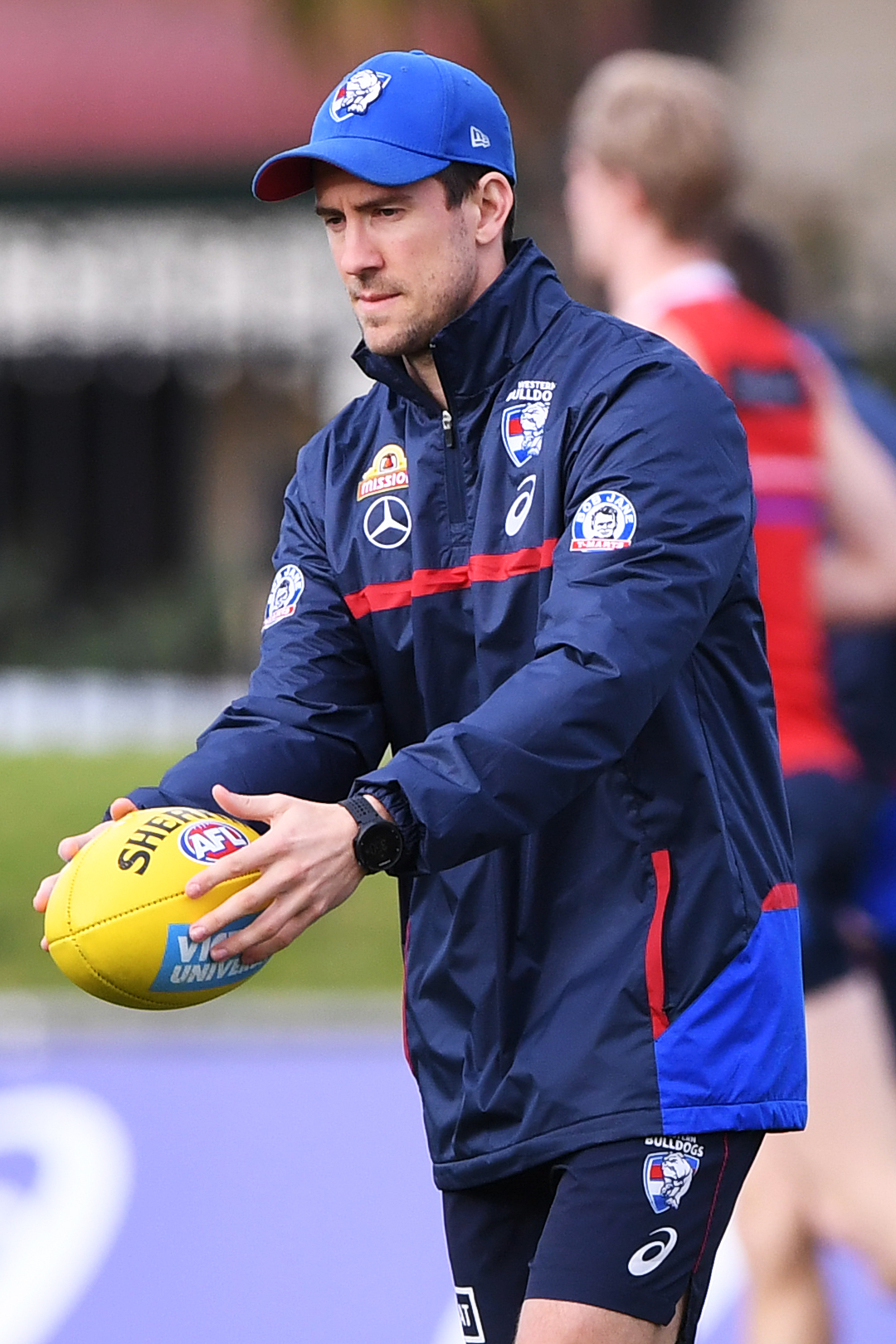
- Russell in August 2018

Personal information
- Full name: Jordan Russell
- Born: 6 November 1986 (age 39)
- Original team: West Adelaide (SANFL)
- Draft: No. 9, 2004 National draft, Carlton
- Height: 188 cm (6 ft 2 in)
- Weight: 86 kg (190 lb)
- Position: Defender

Playing career^{1}
| Years | Club | Games (Goals) |
| 2005–2012 | Carlton | 116 (18) |
| 2013 | Collingwood | 9 (0) |
| Total | | 125 (18) |
- ^{1} Playing statistics correct to the end of 2013.

Career highlights
- VFL premiership captain – 2014, 2016; VFL state team captain – 2016

Jordan Russell (born 6 November 1986) is an Australian rules footballer who played for the Collingwood Football Club and the Carlton Football Club in the Australian Football League.

Russell was recruited as the number 9 draft pick in the 2004 AFL draft from West Adelaide. He made his AFL debut for the Carlton Football Club in Round 15, 2005 against St Kilda, his only match for the year. He spent most of the season developing in Carlton's VFL-affiliate, the Northern Bullants. In 2006, he broke into the senior team, playing ten games, mostly off the bench.

Russell expressed his desire to move back to South Australia for the 2007 season, with Port Adelaide seeking to trade for him, but no deal was made between the two clubs, and Russell re-signed with Carlton on 16 October 2006 to a two-year deal. In 2007, Russell played 18 games, but had not yet stamped himself as a definite future player.

Under coach Denis Pagan, he struggled for game time, and usually played completely defensive tagging roles, with reasonable success. Pagan was replaced as coach by Brett Ratten in late 2007, and he began to play Russell in the midfield and half-forward line. He played 21 of 22 games in 2008, and earned another two-year contract.

In 2009, Russell played 20 of 23 games, but was dropped briefly at midseason on form. This turned out to be a major turning point in Russell's career, as his form upon return to the seniors was outstanding. He continued his midfield/half-forward role for much of the year, but was forced into the back-line for the final month of the season after several injuries to teammates, where he was equally effective. Due to his strong form in the second half of the season, Russell finished sixth in the 2009 Carlton John Nicholls Medal.

After his success in 2009, Russell continued to be used in two-way roles in the backline, and was a consistent contributor throughout 2010. He played every game, and also assumed responsibility for most of the kick-ins. Russell finished second behind Brownlow Medallist Chris Judd for the John Nicholls Medal.

Russell underwent hip surgery during the 2011 pre-season, and struggled with fitness and form throughout the 2011 season; he was ultimately dropped to the VFL for the latter part of the year.

Russell was delisted after the 2012 season after playing mostly in the VFL. Jordan Russell was picked up by Collingwood during the end of year trade as Carlton received pick 71 in return. Given the retirement of former Collingwood footballer Chris Tarrant, Russell was able to keep his number 2 guernsey that he'd previously had from his days at Carlton. Russell played nine games in his sole season with Collingwood, and was delisted at the end of the season.

Russell joined the Footscray reserves in the Victorian Football League in 2014 as a VFL-listed player and a development coach, He was elevated to co-captain in 2015, then outright captain in 2016, and he captained the VFL state team against the SANFL in 2016. He captained the Bulldogs to two VFL premierships – the first in 2014 as the stand-in Grand Final captain, filling in for injured co-captains Nick Lower and Lukas Markovic, and the second as appointed captain in 2016. Russell retired from the VFL at the end of 2017.
