= Brett Ratten =

Australian rules footballer (born 1971)

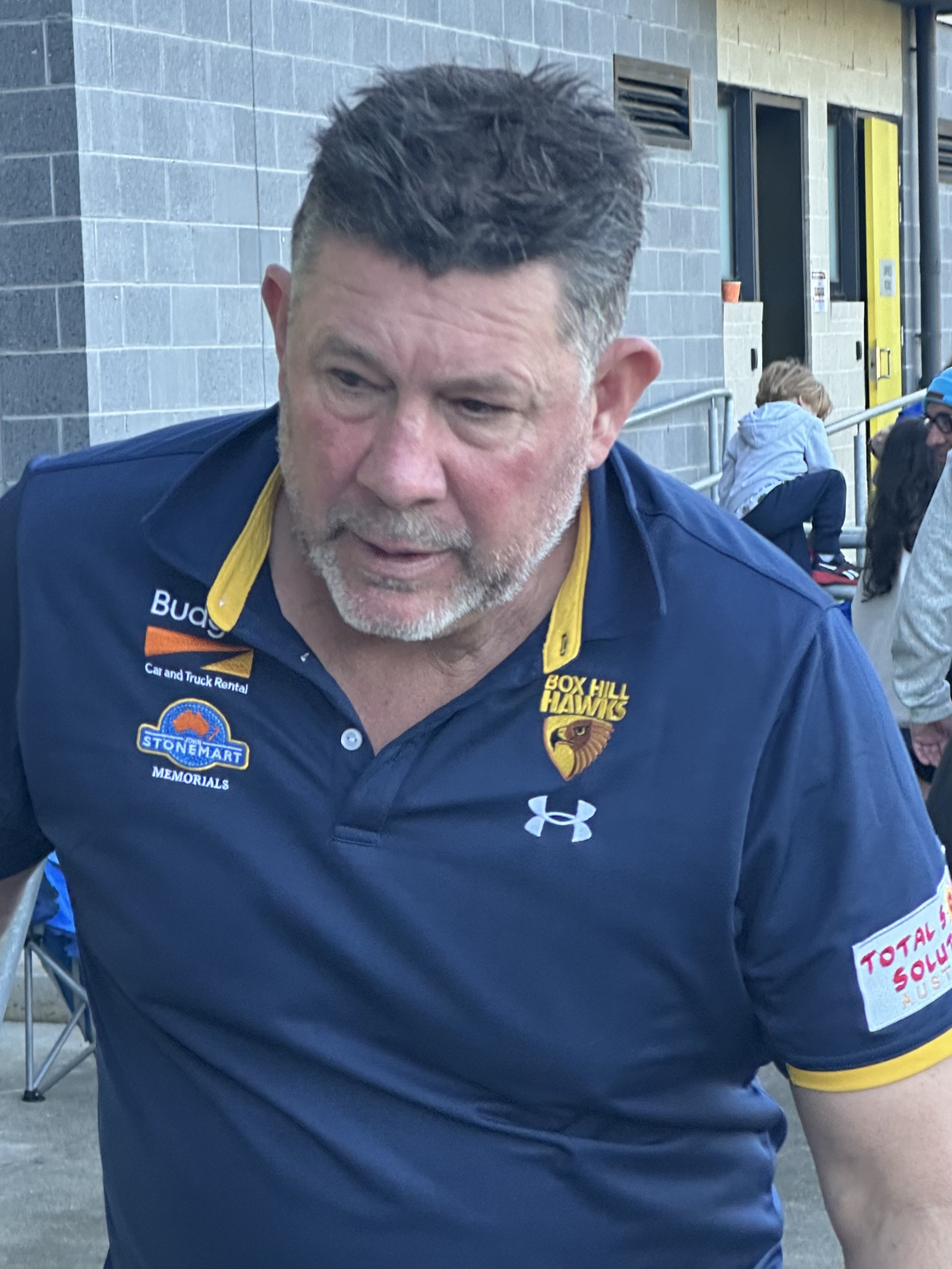
- Ratten in August 2026

Personal information
- Full name: Brett Ratten
- Nickname: Ratts
- Born: 11 July 1971 (age 55); Yarra Glen, Victoria
- Original team: Yarra Glen (YVFL)
- Height: 184 cm (6 ft 0 in)
- Weight: 90 kg (198 lb)

Playing career^{1}
Years	Club	Games (Goals)
1990–2003	Carlton	255 (117)

International team honours
Years	Team	Games (Goals)
2000	Australia	2 (0)

Coaching career^{3}
Years	Club	Games (W–L–D)
2007–2012	Carlton	120 (60–59–1)
2019–2022	St Kilda	68 (34–34–0)
2023	North Melbourne	10 (0–10–0)
Total		198 (94–103–1)
- ^{1} Playing statistics correct to the end of 2003.^{3} Coaching statistics correct as of 2023.

Career highlights
- AFL premiership player: 1995; 2× All-Australian team 2000, 2001; Carlton captain 2002–2003; 3× John Nicholls Medal 1995, 1997, 2000

Brett Ratten (born 11 July 1971) is an Australian rules football coach and former player in the Australian Football League (AFL). He played 255 games for the Carlton Football Club between 1990 and 2003, including the club's 1995 premiership. He then served as Carlton's senior coach from 2007 to 2012. After a seven-year stint as an assistant coach with Hawthorn and St Kilda, in 2019 he was appointed as St Kilda's senior coach, a role he held until his sacking at the end of the 2022 AFL season. Ratten was also the caretaker senior coach at North Melbourne during Alastair Clarkson's leave of absence.

== Playing career ==
=== Carlton ===
Originally from Yarra Glen, Ratten made his debut for Carlton Football Club in the fifteenth round of the 1990 season.

In a career lasting 14 years, Ratten played mainly as an in-and-under midfielder. His unobtrusive style often escaped the attention of media and umpires early in his career. Famously, he won Carlton's best and fairest award in the record-breaking premiership season of 1995, including a game in round 17 against Fitzroy when he amassed 44 disposals, but failed to poll a single Brownlow vote from the umpires for the entire season. In the 1999 season, Ratten was credited with 265 clearances, which (as of 2025) remains the highest on record by a considerable margin – the next-highest is only 205.

Ratten won the Robert Reynolds Trophy (Carlton best and fairest) on three occasions: 1995, 1997, and in a tie with Scott Camporeale in 2000. Ratten was a part of Carlton's premiership team in 1995. He played for Victoria in the State of Origin games in 1996 and 1997. He was awarded All-Australian selection in 1997, 2000 and 2001, firmly cementing his skill in the centre. Ratten was inducted into the Carlton Hall of Fame in 1999. In 2009, statistical analysis company Champion Data announced that Ratten averaged 126.1 ranking points per game during the 2000–2009 decade, the highest of any player in the league.

During his time in football, he had eight arthroscopes on his right knee, three arthroscopes on his left knee and a medial ligament. His shoulder was also badly damaged in 2003, which ultimately led to Ratten announcing his retirement from his playing career in the middle of the 2003 season.

After Craig Bradley chose to step-down as captain at the end of 2001, Ratten was awarded the club's captaincy in 2002, a position he held until his own retirement. After his retirement, in the middle of the 2003 season, the captaincy was passed to Andrew McKay for the rest of the season.

Ratten played a total of 255 games and kicked 117 goals for Carlton from 1990 to 2003. He was also a member of Carlton's 1995 premiership team.

== Coaching career ==
=== Melbourne Football Club assistant coach and Norwood Football Club (2004–2006) ===
After retiring from playing, Ratten spent one year as an assistant coach at the Melbourne Football Club under senior coach Neale Daniher for the 2004 AFL season, before leaving to take a head coaching role at the Norwood Football Club in the Eastern Football League's second division for two seasons.

=== Carlton Football Club (2007–2012) ===
Ratten returned to the Carlton Football Club as an assistant coach under senior coach Denis Pagan for the 2007 AFL season. On 24 July 2007, Pagan was sacked during the middle of the season. Ratten was then appointed as caretaker senior coach of Carlton for the remainder of the 2007 season. Carlton under Ratten lost the remaining six games of the 2007 season to finish in 15th place on the ladder. On 20 August 2007, Ratten was re-appointed as full-time Carlton Football Club senior coach, when he signed a contract until the end of 2009. In the 2008 AFL season, Carlton under Ratten finished in 11th place on the ladder with 10 wins and 12 losses, missing out on the finals.

Under Ratten's coaching, Carlton returned to the finals after a long period of poor performances under Pagan. Carlton reached the finals in the 2009 season, Ratten's second season, finishing seventh and ending a seven-year finals drought, the longest in the club's history. However, Carlton were eliminated by the Brisbane Lions in their elimination final in the 2009 AFL finals series. His contract was extended until the end of 2011 as a result of this improved performance.

Late in the 2010 season, Ratten came under scrutiny as senior coach when Carlton had several big losses, but the club nevertheless reached the finals again, finishing eighth. Ratten began coaching from the boundary line rather than the coaches' box during the season. Carlton were however eliminated by the Sydney Swans in the elimination final in the 2010 finals series. In the 2011 season, he took the team to fifth and an elimination final victory against Essendon, the club's first finals win for 10 years. However, Carlton were eliminated by the West Coast Eagles in the semi-finals in the 2011 finals series. There had been speculation that renewal of Ratten's contract beyond 2011 was contingent on the club winning a final and his contract was extended to the end of 2013 after the season.

Carlton's on-field performance under Ratten in the 2012 season was inconsistent and the club missed the finals, finishing in tenth position on the ladder with eleven wins and eleven losses, after setting pre-season expectations of a top four finish. After the second-last round of the season in Round 22, 2012 after Carlton suffered an upset loss against Gold Coast Suns and was mathematically eliminated from finals contention, Ratten was sacked as senior coach of Carlton after his contract was terminated at the end of 2012, one year early. Including his six games as caretaker coach, Ratten coached 120 games for Carlton, recording 60 wins, a draw and 59 losses, bringing a winning percentage to 50 percent. He was the third person to both play and coach over 100 senior games for the Carlton Football Club, after Ken Hands and Norm Clark. Ratten was then replaced by Mick Malthouse as Carlton Football Club senior coach.

=== Hawthorn Football Club assistant coach (2013–2018) ===
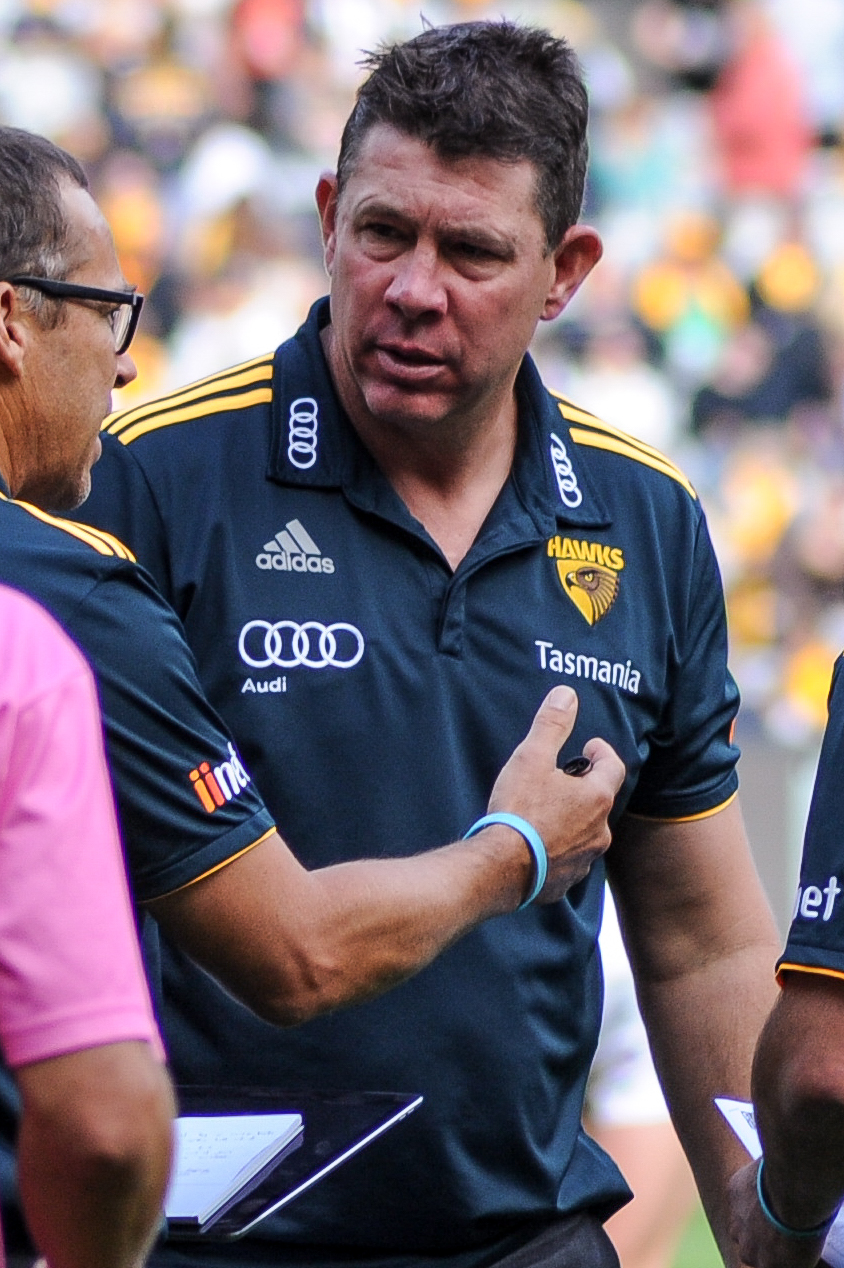
Ratten with Hawthorn in 2017

On 5 October 2012, Ratten accepted an assistant coaching position at the Hawthorn Football Club under senior coach Alastair Clarkson. He commenced in November 2012 and subsequently was part of the club's 2013, 2014 and 2015 premiership coaching panel. Ratten left the Hawthorn Football Club at the end of the 2018 season.

=== St Kilda Football Club (2019–2022) ===
In 2019, St Kilda Football Club appointed Ratten as an assistant coach under senior coach Alan Richardson. Upon Richardson's resignation during the middle of the 2019 season after Round 17, 2019, Ratten was appointed the caretaker senior coach of St Kilda Football Club for the remainder of the 2019 season. In September 2019, after the end of the 2019 season, Ratten was re-appointed as full-time St Kilda Football Club senior coach.

In his first full season as St Kilda senior coach in the 2020 season, the competition was disrupted due to the COVID-19 pandemic, with the season first suspended between March and June and then largely relocated to Queensland as the pandemic took hold in Victoria. Despite being based in Noosa Heads for the length of the season, Ratten took the Saints to their first finals series since 2011, winning their elimination final against the Western Bulldogs at The Gabba by three points before losing and being eliminated by Richmond, the eventual premiers, in a semi-final. In the 2021 season, the Saints under Ratten fell back with on-field performance and finished 10th on the ladder with 10 wins and 12 losses and therefore missing out on the finals.

Ratten was sacked as senior coach of St Kilda on 13 October 2022 at the end of the 2022 season, after a club review in the wake of a disappointing 2022 season in which the Saints under Ratten won 11 games and lost 11 to finish 10th on the ladder, missing out on the finals. Ratten was then replaced by Ross Lyon as St Kilda senior coach, who returned in his second stint as Saints senior coach.

=== North Melbourne Football Club (2023) ===
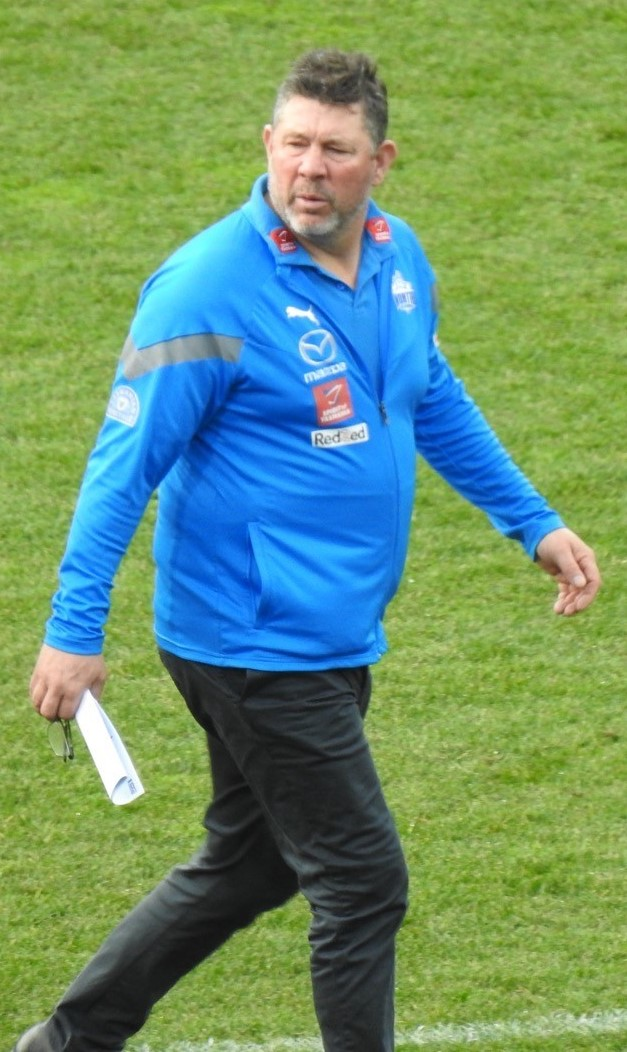
Ratten as caretaker senior coach of North Melbourne during the 2023 AFL season

On 24 November 2022, It was announced that Ratten joined the North Melbourne Football Club in a part-time role as assistant coach in the role of midfield coach, supporting fellow assistant coach in the role of midfield and line coach Jordan Russell under senior coach Alastair Clarkson.

In May 2023, it was announced that Clarkson would step away from his role as North Melbourne senior coach indefinitely, and Ratten was announced as caretaker senior coach of North Melbourne. In doing so, he became the first coach in VFL/AFL history to be appointed as a caretaker senior coach three times.

Ratten coached North Melbourne as caretaker senior coach for a total of 10 games in the 2023 season before Clarkson resumed his role as senior coach in Round 21, 2023 against Melbourne. Ratten then returned to being an assistant coach. Ratten then left the North Melbourne Football Club at the end of the 2023 season.

=== Hawthorn Football Club assistant coach (2024–2026) ===
On 27 September 2023, it was announced Ratten returned to Hawthorn Football Club in an assistant coaching role as Head of Coaching Performance & Development under senior coach Sam Mitchell. Ratten departed the Hawthorn Football Club at the conclusion of the 2026 AFL season.

=== Richmond Football Club assistant coach (2027-present) ===
On 22 September 2026, it was announced Ratten joined the Richmond Football Club as an assistant coach in the role of Head of Coaching and Strategy under senior coach Adem Yze.

== Personal life ==
Ratten's 16 year old son Cooper was killed in a car crash on 16 August 2015.

In 2024, Ratten became an ambassador for the Epilepsy Foundation of Australia due to his family connection to the condition. He has taken part in various awareness and fundraising initiatives for the Foundation, including the Purple Muck Challenge as part of Make March Purple and Treadmill Challenge as part of Walk for Epilepsy.

== Legacy and reception ==
Former Carlton player Heath Scotland, who played under Ratten in Ratten's tenure as senior coach of Carlton praised Ratten, stating “For me, as a player and now a young coach, you learn from the coaches you’ve had and he was probably the man I learnt the most from in my time in playing".

Former St Kilda player Jarrod Lienert who played under Ratten in Ratten's tenure as senior coach of St Kilda praised Ratten stating “My personal experience with him, I thought he was great, and he had a really good relationship with the players and he’s such a caring guy".

Former Carlton player Mitch Robinson who played under Ratten in Ratten's tenure as senior coach of Carlton, described Ratten as "his footy brain was one of the smartest I’ve seen from any coach".

== Statistics ==
=== Playing statistics ===
Statistics are correct to the end of the 2003 season

Legend
G	Goals	K	Kicks	D	Disposals	T	Tackles
B	Behinds	H	Handballs	M	Marks
#	Played in that season's premiership team	†	Led the league for the season

Season	Team	No.	Games	Totals							Averages (per game)							Votes
Season	Team	No.	Games	G	B	K	H	D	M	T	G	B	K	H	D	M	T	Votes
1990	Carlton	40	1	1	0	12	2	14	2	0	1.0	0.0	12.0	2.0	14.0	2.0	0.0	0
1991	Carlton	7	20	3	9	202	207	409	50	41	0.2	0.5	10.1	10.4	20.5	2.5	2.1	1
1992	Carlton	7	19	2	1	163	106	269	30	22	0.1	0.1	8.6	5.6	14.2	1.6	1.2	0
1993	Carlton	7	21	2	2	206	143	349	49	34	0.1	0.1	9.8	6.8	16.6	2.3	1.6	0
1994	Carlton	7	11	2	2	115	70	185	24	21	0.2	0.2	10.5	6.4	16.8	2.2	1.9	0
1995^{#}	Carlton	7	25	12	15	320	251	571	78	75	0.5	0.6	12.8	10.0	22.8	3.1	3.0	0
1996	Carlton	7	24	8	8	297	258	555	74	65	0.3	0.3	12.4	10.8	23.1	3.1	2.7	7
1997	Carlton	7	21	6	8	255	261	516	66	68	0.3	0.4	12.1	12.4	24.6	3.1	3.2	12
1998	Carlton	7	21	9	10	265	237	502	58	67	0.4	0.5	12.6	11.3	23.9	2.8	3.2	3
1999	Carlton	7	26	14	5	350	320^{†}	670^{†}	68	99	0.5	0.2	13.5	12.3	25.8	2.6	3.8	4
2000	Carlton	7	25	25	18	395	300	695^{†}	115	75	1.0	0.7	15.8	12.0	27.8	4.6	3.0	18
2001	Carlton	7	22	21	11	300	273	573	83	103	1.0	0.5	13.6	12.4	26.0	3.8	4.7	8
2002	Carlton	7	12	9	5	125	135	260	33	58	0.8	0.4	10.4	11.3	21.7	2.8	4.8	0
2003	Carlton	7	7	3	4	82	46	128	18	24	0.4	0.6	11.7	6.6	18.3	2.6	3.4	0
Career			255	117	98	3087	2609	5696	748	752	0.5	0.4	12.1	10.2	22.3	2.9	2.9	53

=== Coaching statistics ===
Legend
W	Wins	L	Losses	D	Draws	W%	Winning percentage	LP	Ladder position	LT	League teams

Season	Team	Games	W	L	D	W %	LP	LT
2007*	Carlton	6	0	6	0	0.0%	—	16
2008	Carlton	22	10	12	0	45.5%	11	16
2009	Carlton	23	13	10	0	56.5%	7	16
2010	Carlton	23	11	12	0	47.8%	8	16
2011	Carlton	24	15	8	1	64.6%	5	17
2012	Carlton	22	11	11	0	50.0%	10	18
2019*	St Kilda	6	3	3	0	50.0%	—	18
2020	St Kilda	19	11	8	0	57.9%	6	18
2021	St Kilda	22	10	12	0	45.5%	10	18
2022	St Kilda	21	10	11	0	47.6%	10	18
2023*	North Melbourne	10	0	10	0	0.0%	—	18
Career totals		198	94	103	1	47.73%		

* = Caretaker coach

== Honours and achievements ==
=== Playing ===
Team

- AFL premiership player (Carlton): 1995
- AFL minor premiership (Carlton): 1995
- McClelland Trophy (Carlton): 1995

Individual

- 2× All-Australian team: 2000, 2001
- Carlton captain: 2002–2003
- 3× John Nicholls Medal: 1995, 1997, 2000

=== Coaching ===
Team

- 3× AFL premiership assistant coach (Hawthorn): 2013, 2014, 2015
