= 2015 Hawthorn Football Club season =

91st season in the Australian Football League

Hawthorn Football Club
2015 season
- President: Andrew Newbold
- Coach: Alastair Clarkson
- Captain: Luke Hodge
- Home grounds: Melbourne Cricket Ground; Aurora Stadium
- AFL season: 16–6 (3rd)
- Finals series: Premiers (Defeated West Coast 107–61)
- Best and Fairest: Josh Gibson
- Leading goalkicker: Jack Gunston (57)
- Highest home attendance: 73,584 (Round 1 vs Geelong)
- Lowest home attendance: 11,320 (Round 9 vs Gold Coast)
- Average home attendance: 41,314

The 2015 season was the Hawthorn Football Club's 91st season in the Australian Football League and 114th overall. Hawthorn entered the season as the two-time defending AFL premiers, having won back-to-back AFL premierships. Hawthorn won their third consecutive AFL premiership, fifth AFL premiership, and thirteenth premiership overall, defeating West Coast 107–61 in the Grand Final. Hawthorn became the first team to win five premierships in the AFL era. Hawthorn became just the second team in the AFL era to win three-consecutive premierships; joining the Brisbane Lions (2001–2003); and the sixth team in VFL/AFL history to win three consecutive premierships; joining Carlton (1906–1908), Collingwood (1927–1930), and Melbourne (twice; 1939–1941, 1955–1957). Alastair Clarkson won his fourth premiership as coach, tying with Leigh Matthews for most premierships won in the AFL era. Clarkson also surpassed John Kennedy Sr. and Allan Jeans (3) for most premierships won as coach of Hawthorn. Luke Hodge joined Michael Voss as the only players to captain three premierships in the AFL era. Grant Birchall, Shaun Burgoyne, Luke Hodge, Jordan Lewis, Sam Mitchell, Cyril Rioli, and Jarryd Roughead all won their fourth premierships, tying with Martin Pike for the most in the AFL era. Shaun Burgoyne played in his sixth AFL Grand Final, tying with Martin Pike for the most appearances in the AFL era.

== Club summary ==
The 2015 AFL season was the 119th season of the VFL/AFL competition since its inception in 1897; having entered the competition in 1925, it was the 91st season contested by the Hawthorn Football Club. The Melbourne Cricket Ground once again acted as Hawthorn's primary home ground, hosting six of the club's eleven home games, with four games played at their secondary home ground, Aurora Stadium in Launceston, and one played at Etihad Stadium in Round 21. The four matches at Aurora Stadium were against the Western Bulldogs, Gold Coast Suns, Fremantle and the Brisbane Lions in rounds 3, 9, 15 and 22 respectively, while the one home game at Etihad Stadium was against Port Adelaide in Round 21. The club played Geelong, Essendon, Port Adelaide, Sydney and Carlton twice during the regular season, and travelled interstate five times (twice each to Sydney and Adelaide, and once to Perth).

Major sponsors Tasmania and iiNet continued as the club's two major sponsors, while Adidas continued to manufacture the club's on-and-off field apparel.

== Senior Personnel ==
Alastair Clarkson continued as the club's head coach for the eleventh consecutive season, while Luke Hodge continued as the club's captain for the fifth consecutive season. Both have held their respective positions since 2005 and 2011, respectively.

== Playing list changes ==
During the 2014 off-season, the Hawks acquired the services of Melbourne's James Frawley via the free agency system, as well as those of Greater Western Sydney's Jonathan O'Rourke during the trade period. 200-gamer Brad Sewell announced his retirement shortly after the end of the club's 2014 season, in which the club won their 12th premiership but for which he was overlooked. In addition, Mitch Hallahan, Kyle Cheney and Luke Lowden were all traded away from the club, while Jordan Kelly, Derick Wanganeen and Ben Ross were all delisted.

The following lists all player changes between the conclusion of the 2014 season and the beginning of the 2015 season.

=== Trades ===
9 October 2014	To Hawthorn Jonathan O'Rourke; Pick 43, 2014 AFL draft	To Greater Western Sydney Pick 19, 2014 AFL draft Pick 40, 2014 AFL draft
16 October 2014	To Hawthorn Pick 47, 2014 AFL draft Pick 49, 2014 AFL draft	To Gold Coast Mitch Hallahan
16 October 2014	To Hawthorn Pick 31, 2014 AFL draft Pick 50, 2014 AFL draft Pick 68, 2014 AFL draft	To Adelaide Kyle Cheney; Luke Lowden; Pick 43, 2014 AFL draft Pick 47, 2014 AFL draft Pick 59, 2014 AFL draft

=== Free Agency ===
==== Additions ====
Date	Player	Tag	2014 team	Deal	Compensation	Ref
6 October 2014	James Frawley	UFA	Melbourne	Signed 4-year, $2.2 million deal	1st round pick, 2014 AFL draft	

=== Draft ===
==== AFL draft ====
Round	Overall pick	Player	Recruited from	ref
2	31	Daniel Howe	Murray Bushrangers	
3	49	Teia Miles	Geelong Falcons	
3	50	Marc Pittonet	Oakleigh Chargers	

==== Rookie draft ====
Round	Overall pick	Player	Recruited from	ref
1	18	Jared Hardisty	Claremont	
2	36	Jermaine Miller-Lewis	South Fremantle	
3	53	Lachlan Langford	Melbourne Grammar School	
4	65	Sam Grimley (Note: Grimley was originally delisted by Hawthorn on 9 October 2014 but was re-drafted as a rookie)	Hawthorn	

=== Retirements and delistings ===
Date	Player	2015 team	Reason	Ref
25 March 2014	Dayle Garlett	—N/a	Delisted	
4 October 2014	Brad Sewell	—N/a	Retired	
9 October 2014	Jordan Kelly	Western Bulldogs	Delisted	
9 October 2014	Derick Wanganeen	—N/a	Delisted	
9 October 2014	Ben Ross	—N/a	Delisted	

== 2015 player squad ==
2015 Hawthorn Football Club squad
Senior list		Rookie List	Coaching staff
2 Jarryd Roughead (VC) (vet); 3 Jordan Lewis (VC) (vet); 4 Matt Suckling; 5 Sam Mitchell (vet); 6 Josh Gibson; 7 Ben McEvoy; 8 Taylor Duryea; 9 Shaun Burgoyne; 10 Brad Hill; 11 Brendan Whitecross; 12 James Frawley; 13 Jonathan O'Rourke; 14 Grant Birchall; 15 Luke Hodge (C) (vet); 16 Isaac Smith; 17 Brian Lake; 18 Jonathon Ceglar; 19 Jack Gunston; 20 David Hale; 21 James Sicily	22 Luke Breust; 23 Tim O'Brien; 24 Ben Stratton; 25 Ryan Schoenmakers; 26 Liam Shiels; 27 Matthew Spangher; 28 Paul Puopolo; 29 Will Langford; 30 Kaiden Brand; 31 Angus Litherland; 32 Jonathan Simpkin; 33 Cyril Rioli; 36 Zac Webster; 37 Jed Anderson; 38 Dallas Willsmore; 39 Alex Woodward; 40 Billy Hartung; 41 Daniel Howe; 42 Teia Miles; 43 Marc Pittonet	34 Kurt Heatherley (B); 35 Sam Grimley; 44 Jared Hardisty; 45 Jermaine Miller-Lewis; 46 Lachlan Langford; 47 Shem-Kalvin Tatupu (B)	Head coach: Alastair Clarkson; Assistant coaches: Brett Ratten; Brendon Bolton (Forwards coach); Cameron Bruce (Midfield coach); Adem Yze (Backline coach); Damian Monkhorst (Ruck); Damian Carroll (Football Academy Development Coordinator); David Neitz (Key Position coach); Legend: (c) Captain(s); (vc) Vice-captain(s); Long-term injury list; Upgraded rookie(s); (vet) Veteran's list; (ret) Retired; Updated: 21 July 2015; Source(s): HFC Website; Coaches

== Season summary ==
=== Pre-season matches ===
The club played three practice matches as part of the 2015 NAB Challenge, and were played under modified pre-season rules, including nine-point goals.

Rd	Date and local time	Opponent	Scores (Hawthorn's scores indicated in bold)			Venue
Rd	Date and local time	Opponent	Home	Away	Result	Venue
1	Thursday, 26 February (7:10 pm)	Collingwood	**2.8.6 (72)**	0.17.14 (116)	Lost by 44 points	Aurora Stadium (H)
2	Sunday, 8 March (4:10 pm)	North Melbourne	2.9.13 (85)	**1.9.9 (72)**	Lost by 13 points	Deakin Reserve, Shepparton (A)
3	Thursday, 19 March (7:10 pm)	St Kilda	1.4.6 (39)	**22.13 (145)**	Won by 106 points	Etihad Stadium (A)

=== Premiership Season ===
==== Home and away season ====
Rd	Date and local time	Opponent	Scores (Hawthorn's scores indicated in bold)			Venue	Record	Report
Rd	Date and local time	Opponent	Home	Away	Result	Venue	Record	Report
1	Monday, 6 April (3:20 pm)	Geelong	**17.21 (123)**	8.13 (61)	Won by 62 points	Melbourne Cricket Ground (H)	1–0	Report
2	Sunday, 12 April (3:20 pm)	Essendon	12.6 (78)	**11.10 (76)**	Lost by 2 points	Melbourne Cricket Ground (A)	1–1	Report
3	Sunday, 19 April (1:10 pm)	Western Bulldogs	**19.13 (127)**	8.9 (57)	Won by 70 points	Aurora Stadium (H)	2–1	Report
4	Saturday, 25 April (7:10 pm)	Port Adelaide	15.9 (99)	**13.13 (91)**	Lost by 8 points	Adelaide Oval (A)	2–2	Report
5	Saturday, 2 May (7:20 pm)	North Melbourne	10.10 (70)	**19.16 (130)**	Won by 60 points	Etihad Stadium (A)	3–2	Report
6	Saturday, 9 May (4:35 pm)	Greater Western Sydney	16.12 (108)	**14.14 (98)**	Lost by 10 points	Spotless Stadium (A)	3–3	Report
7	Saturday, 16 May (2:10 pm)	Melbourne	**24.11 (155)**	7.8 (50)	Won by 105 points	Melbourne Cricket Ground (H)	4–3	Report
8	Saturday, 23 May (7:20 pm)	Sydney	**9.15 (69)**	11.7 (73)	Lost by 4 points	Melbourne Cricket Ground (H)	4–4	Report
9	Saturday, 30 May (1:45 pm)	Gold Coast	**14.9 (93)**	6.4 (40)	Won by 53 points	Aurora Stadium (H)	5–4	Report
10	Sunday, 7 June (4:40 pm)	St Kilda	10.9 (69)	**20.12 (132)**	Won by 63 points	Etihad Stadium (A)	6–4	Report
11	Bye							
12	Thursday, 18 June (7:20 pm)	Adelaide	12.13 (85)	**17.12 (114)**	Won by 29 points	Adelaide Oval (A)	7–4	Report
13	Saturday, 27 June (2:10 pm)	Essendon	**16.18 (114)**	11.10 (76)	Won by 38 points	Melbourne Cricket Ground (H)	8–4	Report
14	Friday, July 3 (7:50 pm)	Collingwood	12.19 (91)	**15.11 (101)**	Won by 10 points	Melbourne Cricket Ground (A)	9–4	Report
15	Sunday, 12 July (3:20 pm)	Fremantle	**17.13 (115)**	6.7 (43)	Won by 72 points	Aurora Stadium (H)	10–4	Report
16	Saturday, 18 July (7:20 pm)	Sydney	7.15 (57)	**23.8 (146)**	Won by 89 points	ANZ Stadium (A)	11–4	Report
17	Friday, 24 July (7:50 pm)	Carlton	4.11 (35)	**27.11 (173)**	Won by 138 points	Etihad Stadium (A)	12–4	Report
18	Friday, 31 July (7:50 pm)	Richmond	**7.11 (53)**	10.11 (71)	Lost by 18 points	Melbourne Cricket Ground (H)	12–5	Report
19	Saturday, 8 August (5:40 pm)	West Coast	11.8 (74)	**13.10 (88)**	Won by 14 points	Domain Stadium (A)	13–5	Report
20	Saturday, 15 August (7:20 pm)	Geelong	12.13 (85)	**19.7 (121)**	Won by 36 points	Melbourne Cricket Ground (A)	14–5	Report
21	Friday, 21 August (7:50 pm)	Port Adelaide	**13.8 (86)**	16.12 (108)	Lost by 22 points	Etihad Stadium (H)	14–6	Report
22	Saturday, 29 August (2:10 pm)	Brisbane Lions	**21.8 (134)**	9.8 (62)	Won by 72 points	Aurora Stadium (H)	15–6	Report
23	Saturday, 5 September (4:40 pm)	Carlton	**17.11 (113)**	8.8 (56)	Won by 57 points	Melbourne Cricket Ground (H)	16–6	Report

==== Ladder ====
Pos	Team	Pld	W	L	D	PF	PA	PP	Pts	Qualification
1	Fremantle	22	17	5	0	1857	1564	118.7	68	Finals series
2	West Coast	22	16	5	1	2330	1572	148.2	66	Finals series
**3**	Hawthorn (P)	**22**	**16**	**6**	**0**	**2452**	**1548**	**158.4**	64	Finals series
4	Sydney	22	16	6	0	2006	1578	127.1	64	Finals series
5	Richmond	22	15	7	0	1930	1568	123.1	60	Finals series
6	Western Bulldogs	22	14	8	0	2101	1825	115.1	56	Finals series
7	Adelaide	21	13	8	0	2107	1821	115.7	54 (Note: The round 14 match between Adelaide and Geelong was cancelled due to the death of Adelaide coach Phil Walsh, and both teams were awarded two premiership points each.)	Finals series
8	North Melbourne	22	13	9	0	2062	1937	106.5	52	Finals series
9	Port Adelaide	22	12	10	0	2002	1874	106.8	48	
10	Geelong	21	11	9	1	1853	1833	101.1	48	
11	Greater Western Sydney	22	11	11	0	1872	1891	99.0	44	
12	Collingwood	22	10	12	0	1972	1856	106.3	40	
13	Melbourne	22	7	15	0	1573	2044	77.0	28	
14	St Kilda	22	6	15	1	1695	2162	78.4	26	
15	Essendon	22	6	16	0	1580	2134	74.0	24	
16	Gold Coast	22	4	17	1	1633	2240	72.9	18	
17	Brisbane Lions	22	4	18	0	1557	2306	67.5	16	
18	Carlton	22	4	18	0	1525	2354	64.8	16	

Rules for classification: 1) points; 2) percentage; 3) number of points for.
(P) Premiers

==== Finals ====
Rd	Date and local time	Opponent	Scores (Hawthorn's scores indicated in bold)			Venue	Report
Rd	Date and local time	Opponent	Home	Away	Result	Venue	Report
Qualifying final	Friday, 11 September (6:20 pm)	West Coast	14.12 (96)	**9.10 (64)**	Lost by 32 points	Domain Stadium (A)	Report
Semi-final	Friday, 18 September (7:50 pm)	Adelaide	**21.9 (135)**	8.13 (61)	Won by 74 points	Melbourne Cricket Ground (H)	Report
Preliminary final	Friday, 25 September (6:20 pm)	Fremantle	10.7 (67)	**15.4 (94)**	Won by 27 points	Domain Stadium (A)	Report
Grand Final	Saturday, 3 October (2:30 pm)	West Coast	**16.11 (107)**	8.13 (61)	Won by 46 points	Melbourne Cricket Ground (H)	Report

== Awards, Records & Milestones ==
=== Awards ===
- 2015 All-Australian team selection: Josh Gibson, Sam Mitchell, Cyril Rioli
- Norm Smith Medallist: Cyril Rioli

=== Records ===
- Round 1: Sam Mitchell kicked Hawthorn's 170,000th point in the VFL/AFL
- Round 17: Hawthorn inflicted Carlton's heaviest AFL defeat, winning by 138 points. The Hawks' score of 27.11 (173) was also the highest score posted during the AFL season.

=== Milestones ===
- Round 1: James Frawley – first AFL game for Hawthorn (previously with Melbourne)
- Round 2:
  - James Sicily – AFL debut
  - Jonathan O'Rourke – first AFL game for Hawthorn (previously with Greater Western Sydney)
- Round 3:
  - Jarryd Roughead – 450th AFL goal
- Round 7:
  - Grant Birchall – 200th AFL game
- Round 8:
  - Ben Stratton – 100th AFL game
- Round 9:
  - Luke Breust– 100th AFL game
  - Daniel Howe – AFL debut
- Round 10:
  - Taylor Duryea – 50th AFL game
  - Alastair Clarkson – 150th win as head coach
- Round 14:
  - Luke Breust – 200th AFL goal
- Round 15:
  - Luke Hodge – 100th AFL game as Hawthorn captain
  - Paul Puopolo – 100th AFL game
- Round 16:
  - Isaac Smith – 100th AFL game
  - Cyril Rioli – 200th AFL goal
- Round 17:
  - Jack Gunston – 200th AFL goal
- Round 18:
  - Alastair Clarkson – 250th AFL game as head coach
- Round 19:
  - Cyril Rioli – 150th AFL game
- Round 21:
  - Hawthorn's 1,900th game of VFL/AFL football.
- Round 22:
  - Jack Gunston – 100th AFL game
- Semi Final:
  - Matt Suckling – 100th AFL game
- Preliminary Final:
  - Brian Lake – 250th AFL game

== Brownlow Medal ==
=== Results ===
Round	1 vote	2 votes	3 votes
1	Sam Mitchell (Hawthorn)	Luke Breust (Hawthorn)	Jordan Lewis (Hawthorn)
2	Dyson Heppell (Essendon)	Michael Hurley (Essendon)	Jobe Watson (Essendon)
3	Sam Mitchell (Hawthorn)	Jarryd Roughead (Hawthorn)	Luke Hodge (Hawthorn)
4	Isaac Smith (Hawthorn)	Alipate Carlile (Port Adelaide)	Travis Boak (Port Adelaide)
5	Jack Gunston (Hawthorn)	Jordan Lewis (Hawthorn)	Sam Mitchell (Hawthorn)
6	Isaac Smith (Hawthorn)	Jeremy Cameron (Greater Western Sydney)	Callan Ward (Greater Western Sydney)
7	Sam Mitchell (Hawthorn)	Shaun Burgoyne (Hawthorn)	Jarryd Roughead (Hawthorn)
8	Luke Parker (Sydney)	Dan Hannebery (Sydney)	Sam Mitchell (Hawthorn)
9	Isaac Smith (Hawthorn)	Bradley Hill (Hawthorn)	Sam Mitchell (Hawthorn)
10	Luke Hodge (Hawthorn)	Jack Steven (St Kilda)	Sam Mitchell (Hawthorn)
11	Bye		
12	Rory Sloane (Adelaide)	Liam Shiels (Hawthorn)	Patrick Dangerfield (Adelaide)
13	Liam Shiels (Hawthorn)	Sam Mitchell (Hawthorn)	Jarryd Roughead (Hawthorn)
14	Jordan Lewis (Hawthorn)	Cyril Rioli (Hawthorn)	Scott Pendlebury (Collingwood)
15	Luke Breust (Hawthorn)	Sam Mitchell (Hawthorn)	Luke Hodge (Hawthorn)
16	Jarryd Roughead (Hawthorn)	Cyril Rioli (Hawthorn)	Luke Hodge (Hawthorn)
17	Luke Hodge (Hawthorn)	Jordan Lewis (Hawthorn)	Jack Gunston (Hawthorn)
18	Ivan Maric (Richmond)	Dustin Martin (Richmond)	Anthony Miles (Richmond)
19	Andrew Gaff (West Coast)	Matt Priddis (West Coast)	Sam Mitchell (Hawthorn)
20	Sam Mitchell (Hawthorn)	Luke Hodge (Hawthorn)	Cyril Rioli (Hawthorn)
21	Sam Gray (Port Adelaide)	Chad Wingard (Port Adelaide)	Robbie Gray (Port Adelaide)
22	Tom Rockliff (Brisbane Lions)	Liam Shiels (Hawthorn)	Jack Gunston (Hawthorn)
23	Josh Gibson (Hawthorn)	Bradley Hill (Hawthorn)	Sam Mitchell (Hawthorn)

=== Brownlow Medal tally ===
Player	1 vote games	2 vote games	3 vote games	Total votes
Sam Mitchell	4	2	6	26
Luke Hodge	2	1	3	13
Jarryd Roughead	1	1	2	9
Jordan Lewis	1	2	1	8
Jack Gunston	1	0	2	7
Cyril Rioli	0	2	1	7
Liam Shiels	1	2	0	5
Bradley Hill	0	2	0	4
Luke Breust	1	1	0	3
Isaac Smith	3	0	0	3
Shaun Burgoyne	0	1	0	2
Josh Gibson	1	0	0	1
Total	15	14	15	88

- italics denotes ineligible player

== Tribunal cases ==
Player	Round	Charge category	Verdict	Result	Victim	Club	Ref(s)
Luke Hodge	5	Striking	Guilty	Three-match suspension	Andrew Swallow	North Melbourne	
Jordan Lewis	5	Striking	Guilty	Two-match suspension	Todd Goldstein	North Melbourne	
Sam Mitchell	8	Striking	Guilty	$1,000 fine	Tom Mitchell	Sydney	
Ben Stratton	12	Striking	Guilty	$1,000 fine	Eddie Betts	Adelaide	
Josh Gibson	12	Striking	Guilty	$1,000 fine	Charlie Cameron	Adelaide	
Sam Mitchell	15	Misconduct	Guilty	$1,000 fine	Nat Fyfe	Fremantle	
Josh Gibson	17	Striking	Guilty	$1,500 fine	Blaine Boekhorst	Carlton	
Brian Lake	18	Rough conduct	Not Guilty	Cleared at tribunal	Ty Vickery	Richmond	
Luke Hodge	21	Rough conduct	Guilty	Two-match suspension	Chad Wingard	Port Adelaide	
Jordan Lewis	23	Tripping	Guilty	$1,000 fine	Andrew Carrazzo	Carlton	
