= 2014 Hawthorn Football Club season =

90th season in the Australian Football League

Hawthorn Football Club
2014 season
- President: Andrew Newbold
- Coach: Alastair Clarkson; Brendon Bolton (acting)
- Captain: Luke Hodge
- Home grounds: Melbourne Cricket Ground; Aurora Stadium
- AFL season: 17–5 (2nd)
- Finals series: Premiers (Defeated Sydney 137–74)
- Best and Fairest: Jordan Lewis
- Leading goalkicker: Jarryd Roughead (75)
- Highest home attendance: 74,856 (Preliminary final vs. Port Adelaide)
- Lowest home attendance: 12,430 (Round 1 vs. Brisbane Lions)
- Average home attendance: 42,455

The 2014 season was the Hawthorn Football Club's 90th season in the Australian Football League and 113th overall. Hawthorn entered the season as the defending AFL Premiers.

== Overview ==
Following speculation throughout the 2013 season, Lance Franklin announced on 1 October 2013 that he was going to leave the club to join the Sydney Swans on a nine-year, multimillion-dollar contract as a free agent. Hawthorn subsequently received pick 19 in the AFL Draft as compensation, despite the club requesting a higher draft pick from the AFL. The club also traded Shane Savage to St Kilda, receiving Ben McEvoy in return. In March, draftee Dayle Garlett resigned from the club, citing homesickness and being unable to cope with the demands of AFL football and training.

== Playing list changes ==
The following lists all player changes between the conclusion of the 2013 season and the beginning of the 2014 season.

=== Trades ===
10 October 2013	To Hawthorn Ben McEvoy	To St Kilda Shane Savage; Pick 17, 2013 AFL draft
22 October 2013	To Hawthorn Pick 24, 2013 AFL draft Pick 59, 2013 AFL draft	To St Kilda Pick 19, 2013 AFL draft

=== Free Agency ===
==== Departures ====
Date	Player	Type	2014 team	Deal	Compensation	Ref
8 October 2013	Lance Franklin	RFA	Sydney	Signed 9-year, $10 million deal	1st round pick, 2013 AFL draft	
15 October 2013	Xavier Ellis	UFA	West Coast	Signed 3-year deal	None	

=== Draft ===
==== AFL draft ====
Round	Overall pick	Player	Recruited from	ref
2	24	Billy Hartung	Dandenong Stingrays	
2	38	Dayle Garlett	Swan Districts	
3	56	James Sicily	Western Jets	
4	59	Jonathon Ceglar (Rookie Elevation)		
4	71	Will Langford (Rookie Elevation)		

==== Rookie draft ====
Round	Overall pick	Player	Recruited from	ref
1	17	Dallas Willsmore	North Ballarat Rebels	
2	33	Derick Wanganeen (Note: Wanganeen was originally delisted by Hawthorn on 3 October 2013 but was re-drafted as a rookie)	Hawthorn	
3	48	Zac Webster	Glenorchy	
4	57	Ben Ross	North Melbourne	
5	61	Kurt Heatherley	Sandringham Dragons	
6	65	Shem-Kalvin Tatupu	Oakleigh Chargers	

=== Retirements and delistings ===
Date	Player	2014 team	Reason	Ref
2 October 2013	Brent Guerra	—N/a	Retired	
3 October 2013	Andrew Boseley	—N/a	Delisted	
3 October 2013	Amos Frank	—N/a	Delisted	
5 October 2013	Max Bailey	—N/a	Retired	
5 October 2013	Michael Osborne	—N/a	Retired	

== 2014 player squad ==
2014 Hawthorn Football Club squad
Senior list		Rookie list	Coaching staff
2 Jarryd Roughead (VC); 3 Jordan Lewis (VC); 4 Matt Suckling; 5 Sam Mitchell (vet); 6 Josh Gibson; 7 Ben McEvoy; 8 Taylor Duryea; 9 Shaun Burgoyne; 10 Bradley Hill; 11 Brendan Whitecross; 12 Brad Sewell (vet); 13 Kyle Cheney; 14 Grant Birchall; 15 Luke Hodge (C) (vet); 16 Isaac Smith; 17 Brian Lake; 18 Jonathon Ceglar; 19 Jack Gunston; 20 David Hale; 22 Luke Breust	23 Tim O'Brien; 24 Ben Stratton; 25 Ryan Schoenmakers; 26 Liam Shiels; 27 Matt Spangher; 28 Paul Puopolo; 29 Will Langford; 30 Luke Lowden; 31 Angus Litherland; 32 Jonathan Simpkin; 33 Cyril Rioli; 34 Jordan Kelly; 35 Sam Grimley; 37 Jed Anderson; 38 Mitch Hallahan; 39 Alex Woodward; 40 Billy Hartung; 41 James Sicily; 42 Kaiden Brand; 44 Dayle Garlett (ret)	21 Ben Ross; 36 Derick Wanganeen; 43 Dallas Willsmore; 45 Zac Webster; 46 Kurt Heatherley; 47 Shem-Kalvin Tatupu	Head coach: Alastair Clarkson; Assistant coaches: Luke Beveridge; Brendon Bolton; Cameron Bruce; Brett Ratten; Damian Monkhorst (Ruck); Damian Carroll (Football Academy Development Coordinator); Adem Yze (Development); Brent Guerra (Part-time Development coach); Legend: (c) Captain(s); (vc) Vice-captain(s); Long-term injury list; Upgraded rookie(s); (vet) Veteran's list; (ret) Retired; Updated: 12 June 2014; Source(s): HFC Website; Coaches

== Fixture ==
=== Pre-season ===
Rd	Date and local time	Opponent	Scores (Hawthorn's scores indicated in bold)			Venue	Attendance
Rd	Date and local time	Opponent	Home	Away	Result	Venue	Attendance
1	Thursday, 13 February (7:10 pm)	Brisbane Lions	**1.22.13 (154)**	0.3.5 (23)	Won by 131 points	Etihad Stadium (H)	5,003
2	Friday, 21 February (7:10 pm)	North Melbourne	**0.18.10 (118)**	0.7.11 (53)	Won by 65 points	Aurora Stadium (H)	4,000

=== Premiership season ===
Rd	Date and local time	Opponent	Scores (Hawthorn's scores indicated in bold)			Venue	Attendance	Record	Report
Rd	Date and local time	Opponent	Home	Away	Result	Venue	Attendance	Record	Report
1	Saturday, 22 March (4:40 pm)	Brisbane Lions	**21.13 (139)**	13.13 (91)	Won by 48 points	Aurora Stadium (H)	12,430	1–0	Report
2	Friday, 28 March (7:50 pm)	Essendon	12.14 (86)	**13.12 (90)**	Won by 4 points	Etihad Stadium (A)	44,163	2–0	Report
3	Friday, 4 April (7:50 pm)	Fremantle	**21.11 (137)**	11.13 (79)	Won by 58 points	Melbourne Cricket Ground (H)	43,583	3–0	Report
4	Saturday, 12 April (7:40 pm)	Gold Coast	7.7 (49)	**23.10 (148)**	Won by 99 points	Metricon Stadium (A)	17,729	4–0	Report
5	Monday, 21 April (3:20 pm)	Geelong	15.16 (106)	**12.15 (87)**	Lost by 19 points	Melbourne Cricket Ground (A)	80,222	4–1	Report
6	Sunday, 27 April (3:20 pm)	Richmond	7.10 (52)	**18.10 (118)**	Won by 66 points	Melbourne Cricket Ground (A)	52,990	5–1	Report
7	Saturday, 3 May (1:45 pm)	St Kilda	**27.13 (175)**	4.6 (30)	Won by 145 points	Melbourne Cricket Ground (H)	32,924	6–1	Report
8	Friday, 9 May (7:50 pm)	Sydney	15.17 (107)	**13.10 (88)**	Lost by 19 points	ANZ Stadium (A)	34,506	6–2	Report
9	Bye								
10	Saturday, 24 May (7:10 pm)	Port Adelaide	15.10 (100)	**13.8 (86)**	Lost by 14 points	Adelaide Oval (A)	52,233	6–3	Report
11	Sunday, 1 June (4:40 pm)	Greater Western Sydney	**14.10 (94)**	13.9 (87)	Won by 7 points	Melbourne Cricket Ground (H)	17,906	7–3	Report
12	Saturday, 7 June (1:40 pm)	West Coast	**19.9 (123)**	12.7 (79)	Won by 44 points	Aurora Stadium (H)	15,504	8–3	Report
13	Friday, 13 June (7:50 pm)	Carlton	13.12 (90)	**18.10 (118)**	Won by 28 points	Melbourne Cricket Ground (A)	49,624	9–3	Report
14	Saturday, 21 June (2:10 pm)	Collingwood	**17.13 (115)**	13.8 (86)	Won by 29 points	Melbourne Cricket Ground (H)	70,516	10–3	Report
15	Saturday, 28 June (1:45 pm)	Gold Coast	**17.14 (116)**	10.3 (63)	Won by 53 points	Aurora Stadium (H)	13,178	11–3	Report
16	Friday, 4 July (7:50 pm)	North Melbourne	16.12 (108)	**13.10 (88)**	Lost by 20 points	Etihad Stadium (A)	35,025	11–4	Report
17	Friday, 11 July (7:20 pm)	Adelaide	14.8 (92)	**15.14 (104)**	Won by 12 points	Adelaide Oval (A)	50,321	12–4	Report
18	Saturday, 26 July (7:40 pm)	Sydney	**15.14 (104)**	13.16 (94)	Won by 10 points	Melbourne Cricket Ground (H)	72,768	13–4	Report
19	Sunday, 3 August (3:20 pm)	Western Bulldogs	**16.11 (107)**	6.9 (45)	Won by 62 points	Aurora Stadium (H)	14,187	14–4	Report
20	Saturday, 9 August (4:40 pm)	Melbourne	**17.13 (115)**	9.11 (65)	Won by 50 points	Melbourne Cricket Ground (H)	37,088	15–4	Report
21	Sunday, 17 August (2:40 pm)	Fremantle	17.8 (110)	**13.13 (91)**	Lost by 19 points	Patersons Stadium (A)	38,506	15–5	Report
22	Saturday, 23 August (7:40 pm)	Geelong	**14.10 (94)**	11.5 (71)	Won by 23 points	Melbourne Cricket Ground (H)	72,216	16–5	Report
23	Friday, 29 August (7:50 pm)	Collingwood	8.8 (56)	**18.13 (121)**	Won by 65 points	Melbourne Cricket Ground (A)	48,980	17–5	Report

=== Ladder ===
2014 AFL ladder
Pos	Team	Pld	W	L	D	PF	PA	PP	Pts	
1	Sydney	22	17	5	0	2126	1488	142.9	68	Finals series
**2**	Hawthorn (P)	**22**	**17**	**5**	**0**	**2458**	**1746**	**140.8**	68	Finals series
3	Geelong	22	17	5	0	2033	1787	113.8	68	Finals series
4	Fremantle	22	16	6	0	2029	1556	130.4	64	Finals series
5	Port Adelaide	22	14	8	0	2180	1678	129.9	56	Finals series
6	North Melbourne	22	14	8	0	2026	1731	117.0	56	Finals series
7	Essendon	22	12	9	1	1828	1719	106.3	50	Finals series
8	Richmond	22	12	10	0	1887	1784	105.8	48	Finals series
9	West Coast	22	11	11	0	2045	1750	116.9	44	
10	Adelaide	22	11	11	0	2175	1907	114.1	44	
11	Collingwood	22	11	11	0	1766	1876	94.1	44	
12	Gold Coast	22	10	12	0	1917	2045	93.7	40	
13	Carlton	22	7	14	1	1891	2107	89.7	30	
14	Western Bulldogs	22	7	15	0	1784	2177	81.9	28	
15	Brisbane Lions	22	7	15	0	1532	2212	69.3	28	
16	Greater Western Sydney	22	6	16	0	1780	2320	76.7	24	
17	Melbourne	22	4	18	0	1336	1954	68.4	16	
18	St Kilda	22	4	18	0	1480	2436	60.8	16	

Source: AFL Tables
Rules for classification: 1) points; 2) percentage; 3) number of points for.
(P) Premiers

=== Finals series ===
Rd	Date and local time	Opponent	Scores (Hawthorn's scores indicated in bold)			Venue	Attendance	Report
Rd	Date and local time	Opponent	Home	Away	Result	Venue	Attendance	Report
Qualifying final	Friday, 5 September (7:50 pm)	Geelong	**15.14 (104)**	10.8 (68)	Won by 36 points	Melbourne Cricket Ground (H)	74,757	Report
Semi-final	Advanced to Preliminary final							
Preliminary final	Saturday, 20 September (4:45 pm)	Port Adelaide	**15.7 (97)**	13.16 (94)	Won by 3 points	Melbourne Cricket Ground (H)	74,856	Report
Grand final	Saturday, 27 September (2:30 pm)	Sydney	11.8 (74)	**21.11 (137)**	Won by 63 points	Melbourne Cricket Ground (A)	99,460	Report

== Awards, Records & Milestones ==
=== Awards ===
- J.J. Liston Trophy - Alex Woodward while playing for the Hawthorn affiliate, Box Hill Football Club.
- 2014 All-Australian team selection - Jarryd Roughead, Jordan Lewis & Luke Breust
- Norm Smith Medal - Luke Hodge
- Peter Crimmins Medal - Jordan Lewis

=== Records ===
- Round 3 - Jack Gunston kicks Hawthorn's 24,000th goal in VFL/AFL competition.
- Round 4 - Hawthorn's largest winning margin against Gold Coast (99 points)
- Round 7 - Hawthorn's largest winning margin against St Kilda (145 points)
- Round 13 - Hawthorn's 900th win since joining the VFL/AFL in 1925.

=== Milestones ===
- Round 1 - Ben McEvoy - played first AFL game for Hawthorn.
- Round 1 - Derick Wanganeen - played his first AFL game.
- Round 1 - Tim O'Brien - played his first AFL game.
- Round 2 - Angus Litherland - played his first AFL game.
- Round 2 - Josh Gibson - played his 150th AFL game
- Round 3 - David Hale - played his 200th AFL game.
- Round 5 - Mitch Hallahan - played his first AFL game.
- Round 6 - Shaun Burgoyne - played his 250th AFL game.
- Round 6 - Sam Mitchell - played his 250th AFL game.
- Round 7 - Jordan Lewis - played his 200th AFL game.
- Round 7 - Billy Hartung - played his first AFL game.
- Round 10 - Alastair Clarkson - sets club record of 222 consecutive games as coach.
- Round 11 - Brendon Bolton - first game as senior coach.
- Round 12 - Luke Lowden - played his first AFL game.
- Round 13 - Ben Ross - played first AFL game for Hawthorn.
- Round 14 - Shaun Burgoyne - played his 100th AFL game for Hawthorn.
- Round 14 - Jarryd Roughead - kicked his 400th goal in his AFL career.
- Round 18 - Ben McEvoy - played his 100th AFL game.
- Round 18 - Jarryd Roughead - played his 200th AFL game.
- Round 18 - Alex Woodward - played his first AFL game.
- Round 19 - Jarryd Roughead - kicked his 50th goal for this season.
- Round 21 - Luke Breust - kicked his 50th goal for this season.
- Round 23 - Jack Gunston - kicked his 50th goal for this season.
- Round 23 - David Hale - kicked his 200th career goal.
- Qualifying Final - Brad Sewell - played his 200th AFL game.
- Qualifying Final - Liam Shiels - played his 100th AFL game.
- Preliminary Final - Bradley Hill - played his 50th AFL game.
- Preliminary Final - Matthew Spangher - played his 50th AFL game.
- Grand Final - Luke Hodge - played his 250th AFL game.

== Brownlow Medal ==
=== Results ===
Round	1 vote	2 votes	3 votes
1	Grant Birchall (Hawthorn)	Jarryd Roughead (Hawthorn)	Liam Shiels (Hawthorn)
2	Josh Gibson (Hawthorn)	Michael Hibberd (Essendon)	Shaun Burgoyne (Hawthorn)
3	Matt Suckling (Hawthorn)	Isaac Smith (Hawthorn)	Sam Mitchell (Hawthorn)
4	Luke Hodge (Hawthorn)	Sam Mitchell (Hawthorn)	Jack Gunston (Hawthorn)
5	Jimmy Bartel (Geelong)	Steve Johnson (Geelong)	Tom Hawkins (Geelong)
6	Cyril Rioli (Hawthorn)	Sam Mitchell (Hawthorn)	Luke Hodge (Hawthorn)
7	Luke Hodge (Hawthorn)	Luke Breust (Hawthorn)	Grant Birchall (Hawthorn)
8	Lance Franklin (Sydney)	Josh P. Kennedy (Sydney)	Dan Hannebery (Sydney)
9	Bye		
10	Jared Polec (Port Adelaide)	Jordan Lewis (Hawthorn)	Travis Boak (Port Adelaide)
11	Devon Smith (Greater Western Sydney)	Isaac Smith (Hawthorn)	Callan Ward (Greater Western Sydney)
12	Matthew Spangher (Hawthorn)	Luke Hodge (Hawthorn)	Jarryd Roughead (Hawthorn)
13	Andrew Carrazzo (Carlton)	Bradley Hill (Hawthorn)	Brad Sewell (Hawthorn)
14	Scott Pendlebury (Collingwood)	Brad Sewell (Hawthorn)	Luke Breust (Hawthorn)
15	Jordan Lewis (Hawthorn)	Gary Ablett, Jr. (Gold Coast)	Luke Hodge (Hawthorn)
16	Andrew Swallow (North Melbourne)	Jack Gunston (Hawthorn)	Ben Cunnington (North Melbourne)
17	Jonathan Simpkin (Hawthorn)	Luke Hodge (Hawthorn)	Patrick Dangerfield (Adelaide)
18	Sam Mitchell (Hawthorn)	Jarryd Roughead (Hawthorn)	Ben McGlynn (Sydney)
19	Jordan Lewis (Hawthorn)	Liam Shiels (Hawthorn)	Jarryd Roughead (Hawthorn)
20	Jarryd Roughead (Hawthorn)	Liam Shiels (Hawthorn)	Jordan Lewis (Hawthorn)
21	Stephen Hill (Fremantle)	Jordan Lewis (Hawthorn)	David Mundy (Fremantle)
22	Will Langford (Hawthorn)	Mitch Duncan (Geelong)	Jordan Lewis (Hawthorn)
23	Jack Gunston (Hawthorn)	Josh Gibson (Hawthorn)	Jordan Lewis (Hawthorn)

=== Brownlow Medal tally ===
Player	1 vote games	2 vote games	3 vote games	Total votes
Jordan Lewis	2 (2)	2 (4)	3 (9)	15
Luke Hodge	2 (2)	2 (4)	2 (6)	12
Jarryd Roughead	1 (1)	2 (4)	2 (6)	11
Sam Mitchell	1 (1)	2 (4)	1 (3)	8
Liam Shiels		2 (4)	1 (3)	7
Jack Gunston	1 (1)	1 (2)	1 (3)	6
Luke Breust		1 (2)	1 (3)	5
Brad Sewell		1 (2)	1 (3)	5
Grant Birchall	1 (1)		1 (3)	4
Shaun Burgoyne			1 (3)	3
Josh Gibson	1 (1)	1 (2)		3
Bradley Hill		1 (2)		2
Will Langford	1 (1)			1
Cyril Rioli	1 (1)			1
Jonathan Simpkin	1 (1)			1
Matthew Spangher	1 (1)			1
Matt Suckling	1 (1)			1
Total	14 (14)	10 (30)	14 (42)	38 (86)

- italics denotes ineligible player

== Tribunal cases ==
Player	Round	Charge category (Level)	Verdict	Points^{[a]}	Result	Victim	Club	Ref(s)
Josh Gibson	6	Striking (1)	Guilty	125 (reduced to 70.31 after early guilty plea)	Reprimand	Reece Conca	Richmond	
Jarryd Roughead	8	Rough conduct (1)	Guilty	125 (increased to 218.75 including 93.75 carry-over points)	One-match ban	Ben McGlynn	Sydney	
Brian Lake	16	Rough conduct (1)	Guilty	410	Four-match ban	Drew Petrie	North Melbourne	
Jarryd Roughead	20	Rough conduct (1)	Guilty	80 (increased to 144.06 including 64.06 carry-over points)	One-match ban	Dom Tyson	Melbourne	

== Notes ==
- ^{a} "Points" refers to carry-over points accrued following the sanction. For example, 154.69 points draw a one-match suspension, with 54.69 carry-over points (for every 100 points, a one-match suspension is given).
