= 2013 AFL draft =

Draft for the Australian Football League

General information
- Dates: 21 November 2013; 27 November 2013
- Location: Gold Coast Convention Centre, Gold Coast, Queensland
- Network: Fox Footy
- Sponsored by: National Australia Bank

Overview
- League: AFL
- First selection: Tom Boyd (Greater Western Sydney)

The 2013 AFL draft consisted of six opportunities for player acquisitions throughout the 2013–14 Australian Football League (AFL) off-season. This included the 2013 free agency period (4–18 October), 2013 trade period (7–25 October), three separate delisted player free agency periods (1–25 November), the 2013 national draft held at the Gold Coast Convention Centre (21 November), as well as the 2014 pre-season and rookie drafts (27 November).

== Player movements ==
=== Free agency ===
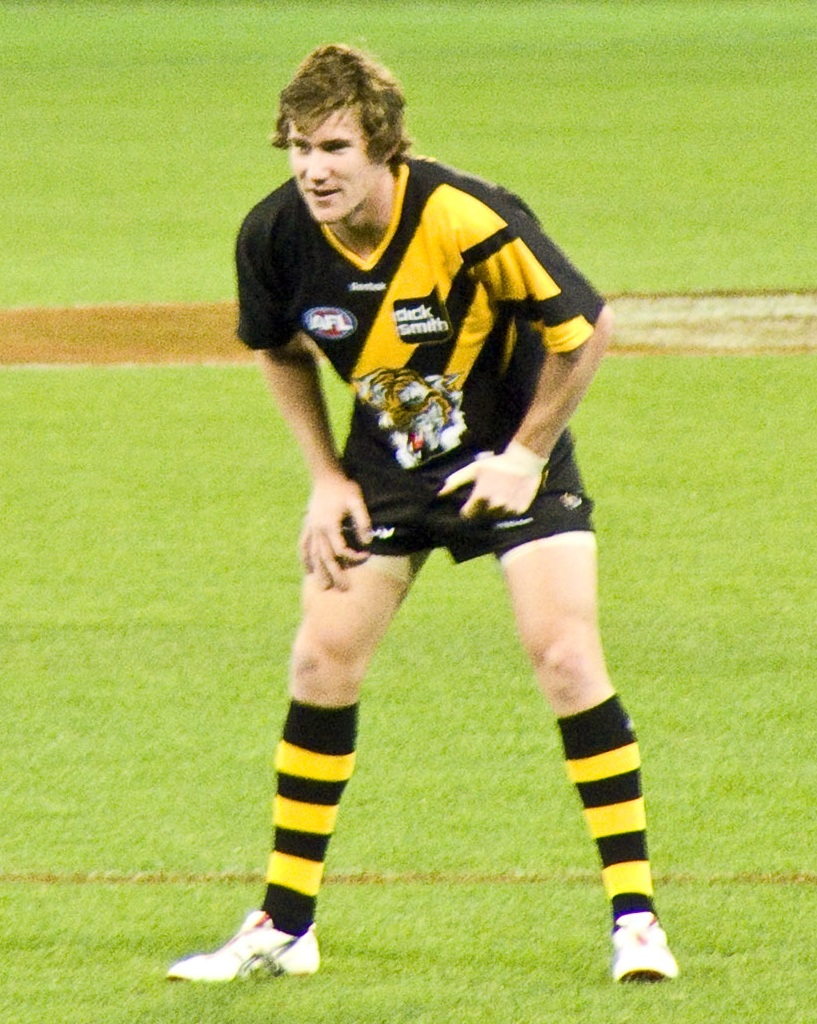
Unrestricted free agent Matthew White moved from Richmond to Port Adelaide

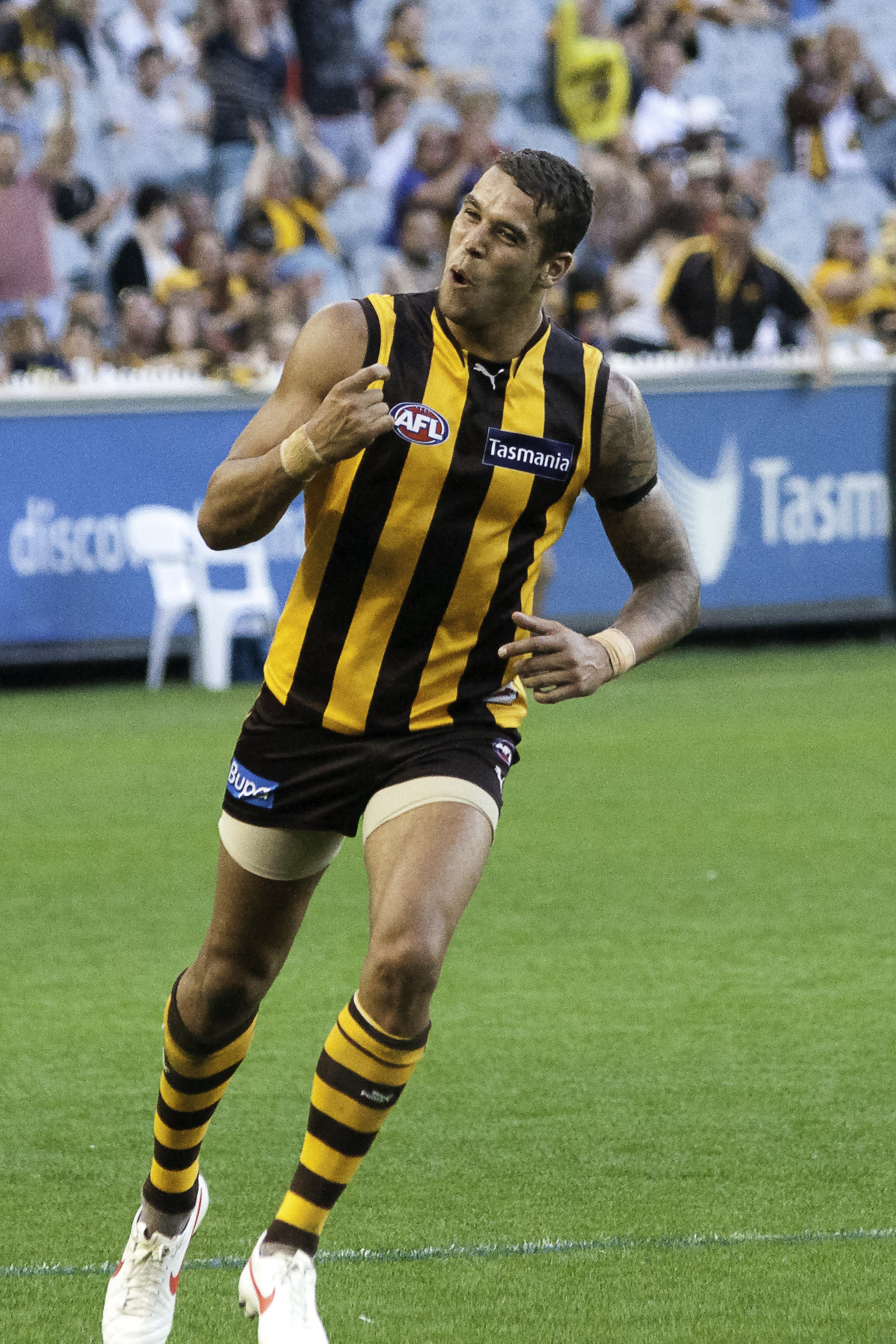
Restricted free agent Lance Franklin moved from Hawthorn to Sydney

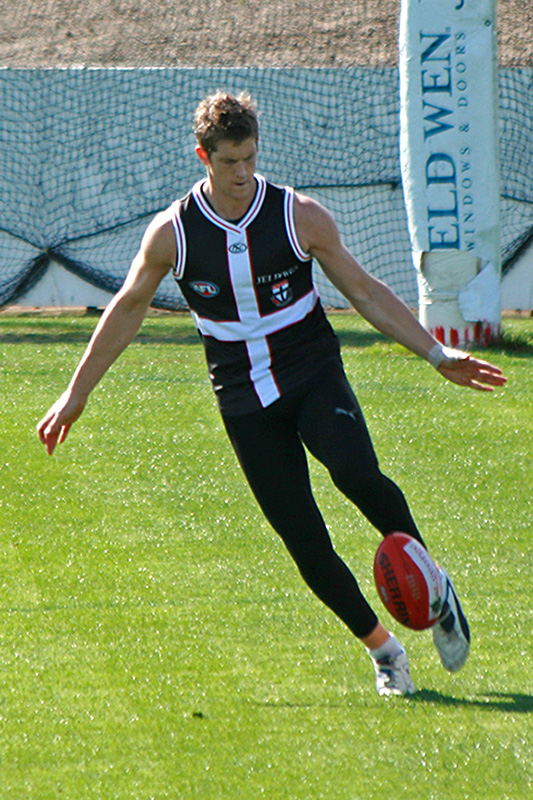
Restricted free agent Nick Dal Santo moved from St Kilda to North Melbourne

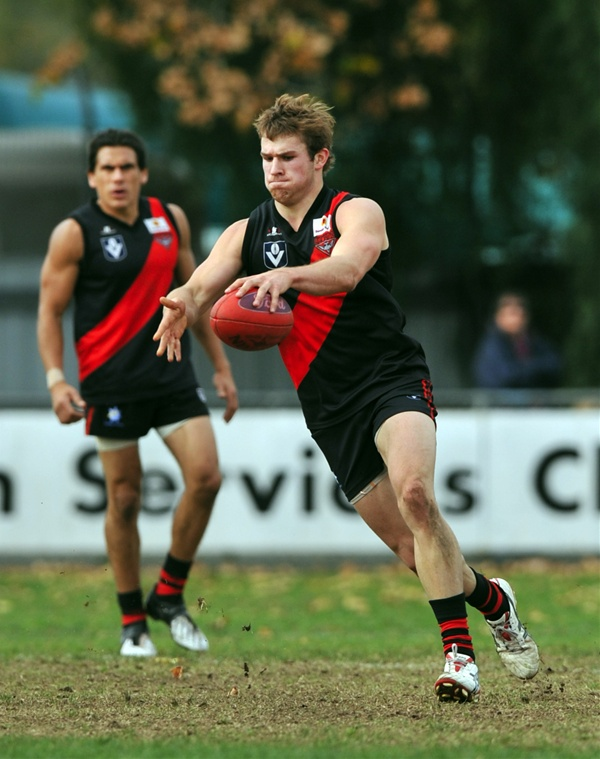
Stewart Crameri was traded from Essendon to Western Bulldogs

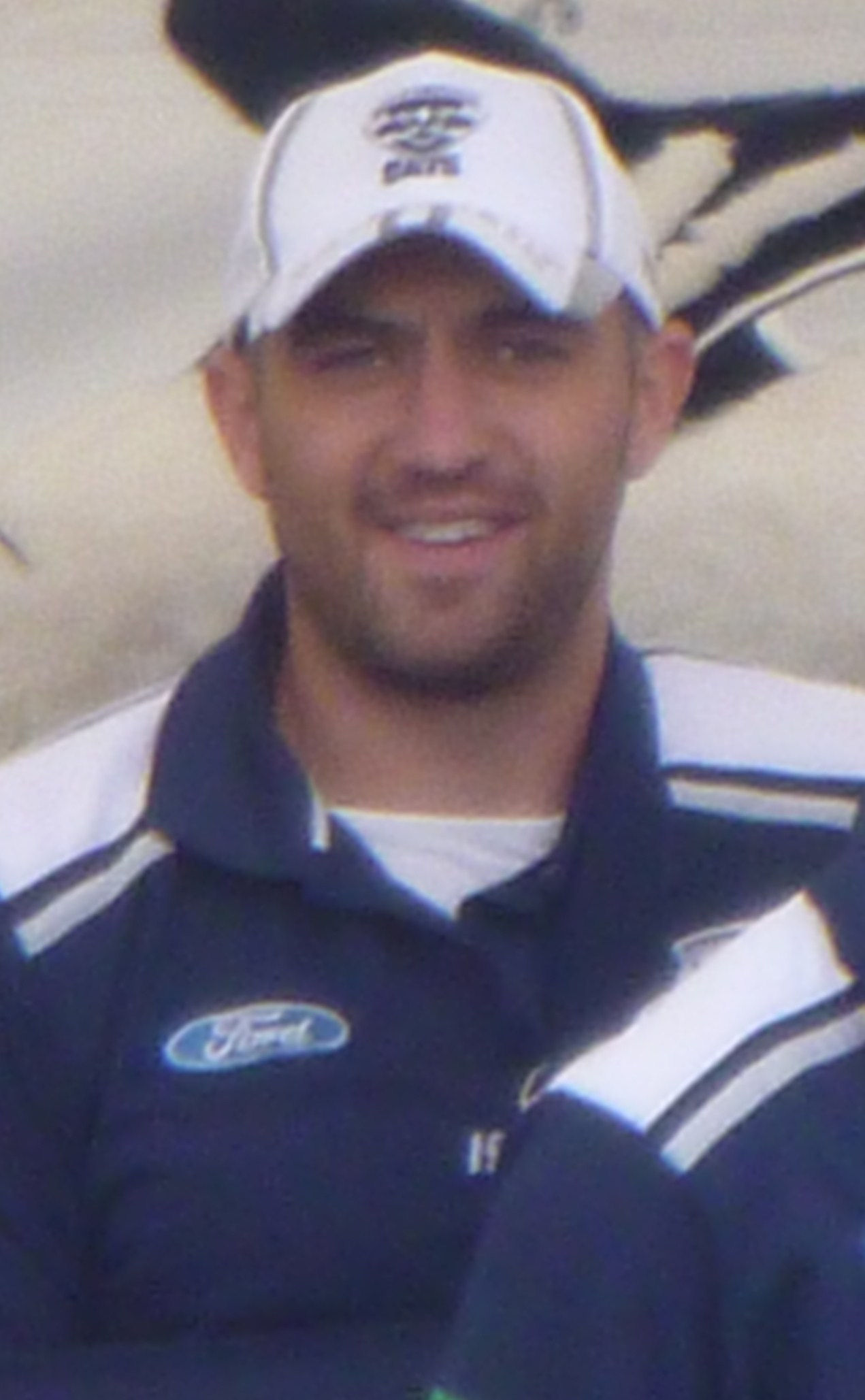
James Podsiadly was traded from Geelong to Adelaide

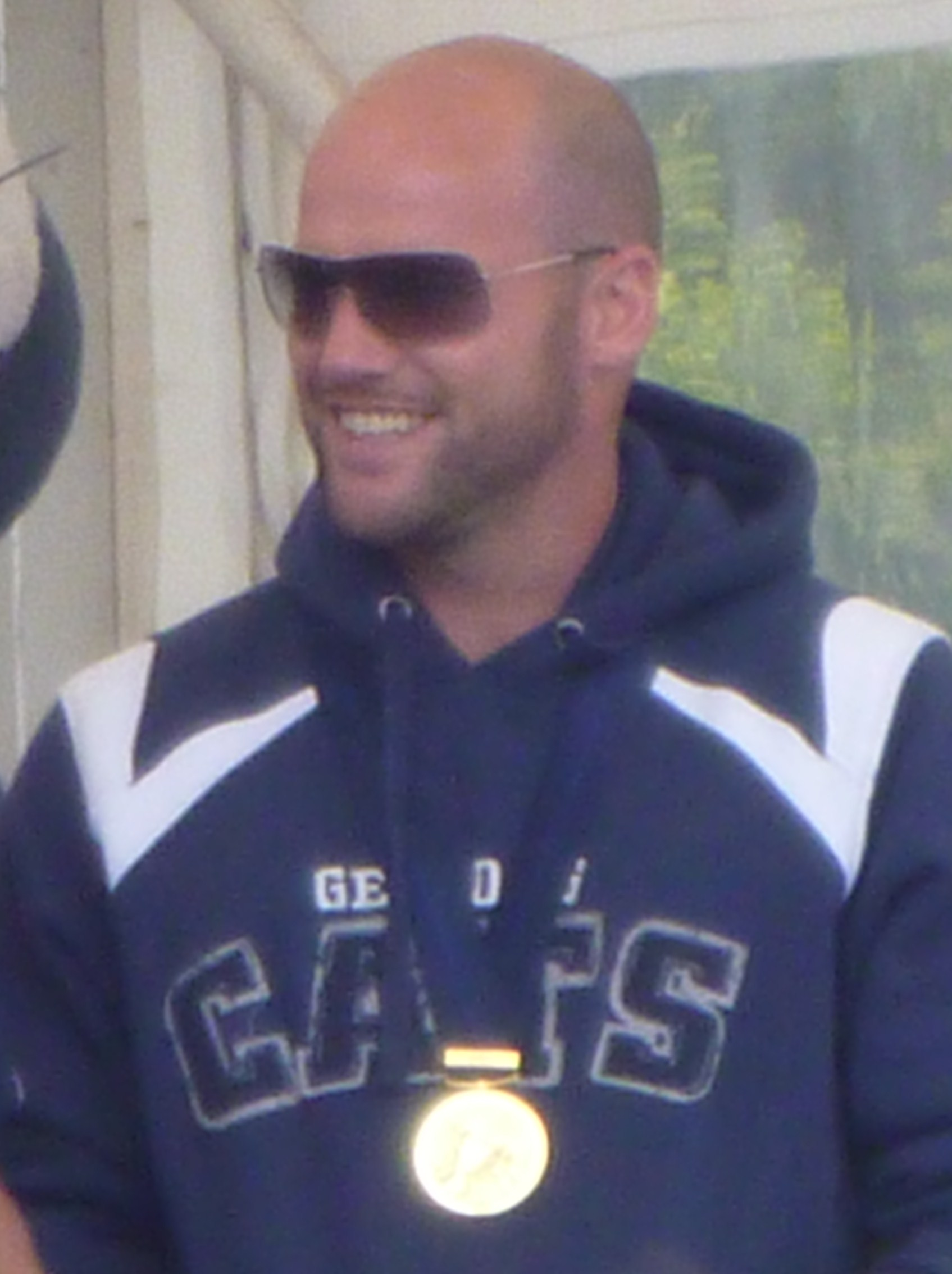
Paul Chapman was traded from Geelong to Essendon

2013 AFL free agency period signings
Player	Date	Free agent type	Former club	New club	Ref
Matthew White	4 October	Unrestricted	Richmond	Port Adelaide	
Colin Sylvia	4 October	Unrestricted	Melbourne	Fremantle	
Eddie Betts	4 October	Restricted	Carlton	Adelaide	
Lance Franklin	8 October	Restricted	Hawthorn	Sydney	
Dale Thomas	9 October	Restricted	Collingwood	Carlton	
Xavier Ellis	16 October	Unrestricted	Hawthorn	West Coast	
Nick Dal Santo	18 October	Restricted	St Kilda	North Melbourne	
Daniel Cross	1 November	Delisted	Western Bulldogs	Melbourne	
Jeremy Laidler	1 November	Delisted	Carlton	Sydney	
Luke McGuane	4 November	Delisted	Richmond	Brisbane Lions	
Dylan Addison	7 November	Delisted	Western Bulldogs	Greater Western Sydney	
Tony Armstrong	7 November	Delisted	Sydney	Collingwood	
Robin Nahas	8 November	Delisted	Richmond	North Melbourne	
Aidan Riley	11 November	Delisted	Adelaide	Melbourne	
Tom Derickx	18 November	Delisted	Richmond	Sydney	

Compensation draft picks

The following compensation draft picks were dispensed to four clubs by the AFL based on all restricted and unrestricted free agency transfers during the initial transfer window:

- Collingwood – First-round selection (pick 11)
- Hawthorn – First-round selection (pick 19)
- Melbourne – Second-round selection (pick 23)
- St Kilda – Second-round selection (pick 25)

=== Trades ===
2013 AFL trade period
Trade	Player	Traded from	Traded to	Traded for	Ref
1	Shaun Hampson	Carlton	Richmond	Pick 32	
2	Ben McEvoy	St Kilda	Hawthorn	Shane Savage; Pick 18	
3	Viv Michie	Fremantle	Melbourne	Pick 54	
4	Dom Tyson; Pick 9 Pick 53	Greater Western Sydney	Melbourne	Pick 2 Pick 20; Pick 72	
5	Shane Mumford	Sydney	Greater Western Sydney	Pick 35	
6	Bernie Vince	Adelaide	Melbourne	Pick 23	
7	Pick 11; Pick 31; Pick 49	Collingwood	West Coast	Pick 6 Pick 44	
8	Jesse White	Sydney	Collingwood	Pick 44	
9	Luke Delaney	North Melbourne	St Kilda	Pick 77	
10	Pick 24; Pick 59	St Kilda	Hawthorn	Pick 19	
11	Kurt Aylett; Shaun Edwards	Greater Western Sydney	Essendon	Pick 48	
12	Heath Shaw	Collingwood	Greater Western Sydney	Taylor Adams	
13	Stewart Crameri	Essendon	Western Bulldogs	Pick 26	
14	Sam Docherty	Brisbane Lions	Carlton	Pick 33	
15	Elliot Yeo	Brisbane Lions	West Coast	Pick 28	
16	Jared Polec, Pick 45; Pick 21	Brisbane Lions; Greater Western Sydney	Port Adelaide	Pick 34; Pick 14	
16	Pick 34; Picks 22, 48	Port Adelaide; Greater Western Sydney	Brisbane Lions	Jared Polec, Pick 45; Pick 29	
16	Pick 14; Pick 29	Port Adelaide; Brisbane Lions	Greater Western Sydney	Pick 21; Picks 22, 48	
17	Pick 43	Gold Coast	West Coast	Third-round compensation pick (2014)	
18	Patrick Karnezis	Brisbane Lions	Collingwood	Jackson Paine	
19	Billy Longer; Pick 48	Brisbane Lions	St Kilda	Pick 25; Pick 41	
20	Josh Bruce	Greater Western Sydney	St Kilda	Pick 48	
21	James Podsiadly	Geelong	Adelaide	Pick 64	
22	Josh Hunt	Geelong	Greater Western Sydney	Pick 75	
23	Paul Chapman	Geelong	Essendon	Pick 84	
24	Scott Gumbleton	Essendon	Fremantle	Pick 55	
25	Trent West	Geelong	Brisbane Lions	Pick 41	
26	Sam Darley	Greater Western Sydney	Western Bulldogs	Pick 78	
27	Andrejs Everitt; Pick 39	Sydney	Carlton	Pick 32	

Note: The numbering of the draft picks in this trades table is based on the original order at the time of the trade. The number of the pick may have changed due to the allocation of Free Agency compensation picks or clubs not using later picks.

=== Retirements and delistings ===
Name	Club	Date	Notes
Martin Mattner	Sydney	6 June 2013	Retired due to chronic injury troubles
Graham Johncock	Adelaide	1 July 2013	Retired, citing fatigue
Chad Cornes	Greater Western Sydney	3 July 2013	Retired, due to ongoing knee injury
Ben Johnson	Collingwood	15 July 2013	Retired, due to ongoing injuries
Mitch Morton	Sydney	2 August 2013	Retired
Dean Brogan	Greater Western Sydney	14 August 2013	Retired, effective season's end
Adam Selwood	West Coast	15 August 2013	Retired, effective at season's end
Mark Nicoski	West Coast	15 August 2013	Retired, effective at season's end
Joel Macdonald	Melbourne	16 August 2013	Retired, due to ongoing injury issues
Aaron Davey	Melbourne	20 August 2013	Retired, effective at season's end
Brett Ebert	Port Adelaide	21 August 2013	Retired, due to ongoing injury issues
Jason Blake	St Kilda	25 August 2013	Retired, effective at season's end
Justin Koschitzke	St Kilda	25 August 2013	Retired, effective at season's end
Stephen Milne	St Kilda	25 August 2013	Retired, effective at season's end
Jude Bolton	Sydney	26 August 2013	Retired, effective season's end
Andrew Embley	West Coast	28 August 2013	Retired, effective at season's end
Shane Tuck	Richmond	29 August 2013	Retired, effective at season's end
David Hille	Essendon	29 August 2013	Retired, effective at season's end
Nathan Lovett-Murray	Essendon	29 August 2013	Retired, effective at season's end
Daniel Cross	Western Bulldogs	29 August 2013	Delisted
David Rodan	Melbourne	30 August 2013	Retired due to injury, effective immediately
Ashton Hams	West Coast	1 September 2013	Retired
Brad Dick	West Coast	1 September 2013	Retired
Jacob Gillbee	Gold Coast	2 September 2013	Delisted
Kyal Horsley	Gold Coast	2 September 2013	Delisted
Liam Patrick	Gold Coast	2 September 2013	Delisted
Maverick Weller	Gold Coast	2 September 2013	Delisted
Joel Wilkinson	Gold Coast	2 September 2013	Delisted
Luke Davis	Essendon	3 September 2013	Delisted
Hal Hunter	Essendon	3 September 2013	Delisted
Nick Lower	Western Bulldogs	3 September 2013	Delisted
Lukas Markovic	Western Bulldogs	3 September 2013	Delisted
Patrick Veszpremi	Western Bulldogs	3 September 2013	Delisted
Setanta Ó hAilpín	Greater Western Sydney	4 September 2013	Delisted
Bret Thornton	Greater Western Sydney	4 September 2013	Delisted
Gerald Ugle	Greater Western Sydney	4 September 2013	Delisted
Josh Growden	Greater Western Sydney	4 September 2013	Delisted
Joe Redfern	Greater Western Sydney	4 September 2013	Delisted
Benjamin Speight	North Melbourne	5 September 2013	Delisted
Cameron Richardson	North Melbourne	5 September 2013	Delisted
Darren Jolly	Collingwood	10 September 2013	Delisted
Alan Didak	Collingwood	10 September 2013	Delisted
Andrew Krakouer	Collingwood	10 September 2013	Delisted
Jordan Russell	Collingwood	10 September 2013	Delisted
Ben Richmond	Collingwood	10 September 2013	Delisted
Michael Hartley	Collingwood	10 September 2013	Delisted
James Sellar	Melbourne	11 September 2013	Delisted
Josh Tynan	Melbourne	11 September 2013	Delisted
Troy Davis	Melbourne	11 September 2013	Delisted
Tom Gillies	Melbourne	11 September 2013	Delisted
Tom Couch	Melbourne	11 September 2013	Delisted
Jared Brennan	Gold Coast	12 September 2013	Retired
Nathan Blee	Port Adelaide	16 September 2013	Delisted
Nick Salter	Port Adelaide	16 September 2013	Delisted
Daniel Stewart	Port Adelaide	16 September 2013	Delisted
Matt Thomas	Port Adelaide	16 September 2013	Delisted
Danny Butcher	Port Adelaide	16 September 2013	Delisted
Justin Hoskin	Port Adelaide	16 September 2013	Delisted
Darren Pfeiffer	Port Adelaide	16 September 2013	Delisted
Callum Bartlett	Brisbane Lions	16 September 2013	Delisted
Richard Newell	Brisbane Lions	16 September 2013	Delisted
Niall McKeever	Brisbane Lions	16 September 2013	Delisted
Stephen Wrigley	Brisbane Lions	16 September 2013	Delisted
Jeremy Laidler	Carlton	19 September 2013	Delisted
Aaron Joseph	Carlton	19 September 2013	Delisted
Luke Mitchell	Carlton	19 September 2013	Delisted
Patrick McCarthy	Carlton	19 September 2013	Delisted
Marcus Davies	Carlton	19 September 2013	Delisted
Rhys O'Keeffe	Carlton	19 September 2013	Delisted
Frazer Dale	Carlton	19 September 2013	Delisted
Andrew Collins	Carlton	19 September 2013	Delisted
Ryan Bathie	Geelong	26 September 2013	Delisted
Cameron Eardley	Geelong	26 September 2013	Delisted
Tom Ledger	St Kilda	28 September 2013	Delisted
Jay Lever	St Kilda	28 September 2013	Delisted
Jordan Staley	St Kilda	28 September 2013	Delisted
Alex Brown	Sydney	30 September 2013	Delisted
Jayden Pitt	Fremantle	1 October 2013	Retired
Peter Faulks	Fremantle	1 October 2013	Delisted
Jesse Crichton	Fremantle	1 October 2013	Delisted
Alex Forster	Fremantle	1 October 2013	Delisted
Haiden Schloithe	Fremantle	1 October 2013	Delisted
Alex Howson	Fremantle	1 October 2013	Delisted
Brent Guerra	Hawthorn	2 October 2013	Retired
Andrew Boseley	Hawthorn	3 October 2013	Delisted
Amos Frank	Hawthorn	3 October 2013	Delisted
Tim McIntyre	Adelaide	4 October 2013	Delisted
Tim Klaosen	Adelaide	4 October 2013	Delisted
Dylan Orval	Adelaide	4 October 2013	Delisted
Max Bailey	Hawthorn	5 October 2013	Retired
Michael Osborne	Hawthorn	5 October 2013	Retired
Joel Corey	Geelong	9 October 2013	Retired
Daniel Kerr	West Coast	15 October 2013	Retired
Simon Black	Brisbane Lions	18 October 2013	Retired
Ian Callinan	Adelaide	25 October 2013	Delisted
Nick Joyce	Adelaide	25 October 2013	Delisted
Aaron Cornelius	Brisbane Lions	25 October 2013	Delisted
Jordan Gysberts	North Melbourne	29 October 2013	Delisted
Will Sierakowski	North Melbourne	29 October 2013	Delisted
Aiden Kennedy	North Melbourne	29 October 2013	Delisted
Ben Mabon	North Melbourne	29 October 2013	Delisted
Dylan Addison	Western Bulldogs	29 October 2013	Delisted
James Magner	Melbourne	29 October 2013	Delisted
Nathan Stark	Melbourne	29 October 2013	Delisted
Rory Taggert	Melbourne	29 October 2013	Delisted
Sam Lonergan	Richmond	30 October 2013	Retired
Luke McGuane	Richmond	30 October 2013	Delisted
Robin Nahas	Richmond	30 October 2013	Delisted
Tom Derickx	Richmond	30 October 2013	Delisted
Steven Verrier	Richmond	30 October 2013	Delisted
Richard Tambling	Adelaide	30 October 2013	Delisted
Aidan Riley	Adelaide	30 October 2013	Delisted
Ben Dowdell	Adelaide	30 October 2013	Delisted
Bradd Dalziell	West Coast	30 October 2013	Delisted
Cale Morton	West Coast	30 October 2013	Delisted
Alwyn Davey	Essendon	30 October 2013	Delisted
Tony Armstrong	Sydney	30 October 2013	Delisted
Derick Wanganeen	Hawthorn	30 October 2013	Delisted
Josh Mellington	Fremantle	31 October 2013	Delisted
Jackson Ferguson	St Kilda	31 October 2013	Delisted
Ahmed Saad	St Kilda	14 November 2013	Delisted
Brent Renouf	Port Adelaide	14 November 2013	Delisted
Murray Newman	West Coast	14 November 2013	Delisted
Jed Lamb	Sydney	14 November 2013	Delisted
Todd Banfield	Brisbane Lions	14 November 2013	Delisted
Neville Jetta	Melbourne	15 November 2013	Delisted
Sam Schulz	Greater Western Sydney	15 November 2013	Delisted
Corey Gault	Collingwood	15 November 2013	Delisted

== 2013 national draft ==
Following the completion of the free agency and trade periods, as well as the distribution of compensation picks to qualifying clubs, the final selection order for the 2013 National Draft was confirmed by the AFL on 18 November 2013.

^	Denotes player who has been inducted to the Australian Football Hall of Fame
*	Denotes player who has been a premiership player and been selected for at least one All-Australian team
^{+}	Denotes player who has been a premiership player at least once
^{x}	Denotes player who has been selected for at least one All-Australian team
^{#}	Denotes player who has never played in a VFL/AFL home and away season or finals game
^{~}	Denotes player who has been selected as Rising Star

Round	Pick	Player	Drafted to	Recruited from	League	Notes
1	1	Tom Boyd	Greater Western Sydney	Eastern Ranges	TAC Cup	
1	2	Josh Kelly	Greater Western Sydney	Sandringham Dragons	TAC Cup	Traded from Melbourne
1	3	Jack Billings	St Kilda	Oakleigh Chargers	TAC Cup	
1	4	Marcus Bontempelli	Western Bulldogs	Northern Knights	TAC Cup	
1	5	Kade Kolodjashnij	Gold Coast	Launceston	TSL	
1	6	Matthew Scharenberg	Collingwood	Glenelg	SANFL	Traded from West Coast
1	7	James Aish	Brisbane Lions	Norwood	SANFL	
1	8	Luke McDonald	North Melbourne	Werribee	VFL	Father–son selection – son of Donald McDonald
1	9	Christian Salem	Melbourne	Sandringham Dragons	TAC Cup	Mid first round compensation pick from 2010 traded from Greater Western Sydney
1	10	Nathan Freeman	Collingwood	Sandringham Dragons	TAC Cup	
1	11	Dom Sheed	West Coast	Subiaco	WAFL	Traded from Collingwood; free agency compensation pick (Thomas)
1	12	Ben Lennon	Richmond	Northern Knights	TAC Cup	
1	13	Patrick Cripps	Carlton	East Fremantle	WAFL	
1	14	Cam McCarthy	Greater Western Sydney	South Fremantle	WAFL	Traded from Port Adelaide
1	15	Zak Jones	Sydney	Dandenong Stingrays	TAC Cup	
1	16	Darcy Lang	Geelong	Geelong Falcons	TAC Cup	
1	17	Michael Apeness	Fremantle	Eastern Ranges	TAC Cup	
1	18	Luke Dunstan	St Kilda	Woodville-West Torrens	SANFL	Traded from Hawthorn
1	19	Blake Acres	St Kilda	West Perth	WAFL	Traded from Hawthorn; free agency compensation pick (Franklin)
1	20	Jack Leslie	Gold Coast	Gippsland Power	TAC Cup	End of first round uncontracted player compensation pick
2	21	Jarman Impey	Port Adelaide	Murray Bushrangers	TAC Cup	Traded from Greater Western Sydney
2	22	Darcy Gardiner	Brisbane Lions	Geelong Falcons	TAC Cup	Traded by Greater Western Sydney; received from Melbourne
2	23	Matt Crouch	Adelaide	North Ballarat Rebels	TAC Cup	Traded from Melbourne; free agency compensation pick (Sylvia)
2	24	Billy Hartung	Hawthorn	Dandenong Stingrays	TAC Cup	Traded from St Kilda
2	25	Daniel McStay	Brisbane Lions	Eastern Ranges	TAC Cup	Traded from St Kilda; free agency compensation pick (Dal Santo)
2	26	Zach Merrett	Essendon	Sandringham Dragons	TAC Cup	Traded from Western Bulldogs
2	27	Sean Lemmens	Gold Coast	Port Adelaide	SANFL	
2	28	Lewis Taylor	Brisbane Lions	Geelong Falcons	TAC Cup	Traded from West Coast
2	29	Rory Lobb	Greater Western Sydney	Swan Districts	WAFL	Traded from Brisbane Lions
2	30	Trent Dumont	North Melbourne	Norwood	SANFL	
2	31	Malcolm Karpany	West Coast	Woodville-West Torrens	SANFL	Traded from Collingwood
2	32	George Hewett	Sydney	North Adelaide	SANFL	Traded by Carlton; received from Richmond
2	33	Tom Cutler	Brisbane Lions	Oakleigh Chargers	TAC Cup	Traded from Carlton
2	34	Nick Robertson	Brisbane Lions	West Perth	WAFL	Traded from Port Adelaide
2	35	Toby Nankervis	Sydney	North Launceston	TSL	
2	36	Jarrad Jansen	Geelong	East Fremantle	WAFL	
2	37	Alex Pearce	Fremantle	Devonport	TSL	
2	38	Dayle Garlett	Hawthorn	Swan Districts	WAFL	
3	39	Cameron Giles	Carlton	Woodville-West Torrens	SANFL	Traded by Sydney; received from Greater Western Sydney
3	40	Jay Kennedy Harris	Melbourne	Oakleigh Chargers	TAC Cup	
3	41	Jake Kolodjashnij	Geelong	Launceston	TSL	Traded by Brisbane Lions; received from St Kilda
3	42	Matt Fuller	Western Bulldogs	Norwood	SANFL	
3	43	Tom Barrass	West Coast	Claremont	WAFL	Traded from Gold Coast
3	44	Aliir Aliir	Sydney	East Fremantle	WAFL	Traded by Collingwood; received from West Coast
3	45	Mitchell Harvey	Port Adelaide	North Adelaide	SANFL	Traded from Brisbane Lions
3	46	Riley Knight	Adelaide	Woodville-West Torrens	SANFL	
3	47	Ben Brown	North Melbourne	Werribee	VFL	
3	48	Passed	Greater Western Sydney	—	—	
3	49	Dylan Main	West Coast	South Fremantle	WAFL	Traded from Collingwood
3	50	Nathan Gordon	Richmond	North Adelaide	SANFL	
3	51	Nick Holman	Carlton	Murray Bushrangers	TAC Cup	
3	52	Darcy Byrne-Jones	Port Adelaide	Oakleigh Chargers	TAC Cup	
3	53	Passed	Sydney	—	—	
3	54	Josh Walker	Geelong	Rookie elevation	AFL	
3	55	Orazio Fantasia	Essendon	Norwood	SANFL	Traded from Fremantle
3	56	James Sicily	Hawthorn	Western Jets	TAC Cup	
4	57	Jayden Hunt	Melbourne	Brighton Grammar	APS	Traded from Greater Western Sydney
4	58	Brady Grey	Fremantle	Burnie	TSL	Traded from Melbourne
4	59	John Ceglar	Hawthorn	Rookie elevation	AFL	Traded from St Kilda
4	60	Mitch Honeychurch	Western Bulldogs	Eastern Ranges	TAC Cup	
4	61	Jamie Bennell	West Coast	Rookie elevation	AFL	
4	62	Jonathan Freeman	Brisbane Lions	Aspley	NEAFL	Academy player
4	63	George Burbury	Geelong	Rookie elevation	AFL	Traded from Adelaide
4	64	Lauchlan Dalgleish	Essendon	Rookie elevation	AFL	
4	65	Tom Langdon	Collingwood	Sandringham Dragons	TAC Cup	
4	66	Sam Lloyd	Richmond	Frankston	VFL	
4	67	Passed	Carlton	—	—	
4	68	Karl Amon	Port Adelaide	Sandringham Dragons	TAC Cup	
4	69	Passed	Sydney	—	—	
4	70	Matt Taberner	Fremantle	Rookie elevation	AFL	
4	71	Will Langford	Hawthorn	Rookie elevation	AFL	
5	72	Passed	Greater Western Sydney	—	—	Traded from Melbourne
5	73	Passed	Greater Western Sydney	—	—	Traded from Western Bulldogs
5	74	Jeremy McGovern	West Coast	Rookie elevation	AFL	
5	75	Justin Clarke	Brisbane Lions	Rookie elevation	AFL	
5	76	Kyle Hartigan	Adelaide	Rookie elevation	AFL	
5	77	Jonathon Marsh	Collingwood	East Fremantle	WAFL	
5	78	Passed	Richmond	—	—	
5	79	Passed	Carlton	—	—	
5	80	Brandon Jack	Sydney	Rookie elevation	AFL	
6	81	Passed	Greater Western Sydney	—	—	
6	82	Mitch Clisby	Melbourne	Rookie elevation	AFL	
6	83	Tom Curren	St Kilda	Rookie elevation	AFL	
6	84	Brett Goodes	Western Bulldogs	Rookie elevation	AFL	
6	85	Simon Tunbridge	West Coast	Rookie elevation	AFL	
6	86	Rory Laird	Adelaide	Rookie elevation	AFL	
6	87	Sam Dwyer	Collingwood	Rookie elevation	AFL	
6	88	Passed	Richmond	—	—	
6	89	Ed Curnow	Carlton	Rookie elevation	AFL	
6	90	Dane Rampe	Sydney	Rookie elevation	AFL	
7	91	Passed	Greater Western Sydney	—	—	
7	92	Adam Oxley	Collingwood	Rookie elevation	AFL	
7	93	Ricky Petterd	Richmond	Rookie elevation	AFL	
7	94	Tom Bell	Carlton	Rookie elevation	AFL	
8	95	Zac Williams	Greater Western Sydney	Rookie elevation	AFL	
8	96	Passed	Collingwood	—	—	
9	97	Jake Barrett	Greater Western Sydney	Temora	Farrer FL	NSW zone selection

- Compensation picks are selections in addition to the normal order of selection, allocated to clubs by the AFL as compensation for losing uncontracted players to the new expansion clubs, Gold Coast and Greater Western Sydney. The picks can be held for up to five years and clubs declare at the beginning of the season of their intent to utilise the pick at the end of the season. Picks could be traded to other clubs in return for players or other draft selections.
- Free agency compensation picks are additional selections awarded to teams based on their net loss of players during the free agency trade period.
- Promoted rookies are players who are transferred from a club's rookie list to their primary list.
- Local talent selections are local zone selections available to the new expansion clubs.

== 2014 pre-season draft ==
Round	Pick	Player	Drafted to	Recruited from	League
1	1	Jed Lamb	Greater Western Sydney	Sydney	AFL
1	2	Passed	Collingwood	—	—
1	3	Passed	Richmond	—	—
1	4	Passed	Carlton	—	—
1	5	Passed	Sydney	—	—
2	6	Passed	Greater Western Sydney	—	—
2	7	Passed	Richmond	—	—
2	8	Passed	Carlton	—	—
2	9	Passed	Sydney	—	—
3	10	Passed	Greater Western Sydney	—	—
4	11	Passed	Greater Western Sydney	—	—
5	12	Passed	Greater Western Sydney	—	—

== 2014 rookie draft ==
Round	Pick	Player	AFL club	Original club	League	Notes
1	1	Sam Schulz	Greater Western Sydney	Greater Western Sydney	AFL	
1	2	James Harmes	Melbourne	Dandenong Stingrays	TAC Cup	
1	3	Eli Templeton	St Kilda	Burnie	TSL	
1	4	Louis Herbert	Gold Coast	North Ballarat Rebels	TAC Cup	
1	5	Will Maginness	West Coast	Oakleigh Chargers	TAC Cup	
1	6	Isaac Conway	Brisbane Lions	Aspley	QAFL	
1	7	Charlie Cameron	Adelaide	Swan Districts	WAFL	
1	8	Joel Tippett	North Melbourne	West Adelaide	SANFL	
1	9	Fraser Thurlow	Essendon	Labrador	NEAFL	
1	10	Corey Gault	Collingwood	Collingwood	AFL	
1	11	Todd Banfield	Richmond	Brisbane Lions	AFL	
1	12	Luke Reynolds	Carlton	Port Adelaide	SANFL	
1	13	Samuel Russell	Port Adelaide	Geelong Falcons	TAC Cup	
1	14	Passed	Sydney	—	—	
1	15	James Toohey	Geelong	Oakleigh Chargers	TAC Cup	
1	16	Michael Wood	Fremantle	Subiaco	WAFL	
1	17	Dallas Willsmore	Hawthorn	North Ballarat Rebels	TAC Cup	
2	18	Passed	Greater Western Sydney	—	—	
2	19	Max King	Melbourne	Murray Bushrangers	TAC Cup	
2	20	Maverick Weller	St Kilda	Gold Coast	AFL	
2	21	Passed	Gold Coast	—	—	
2	22	Rowen Powell	West Coast	Claremont	WAFL	
2	23	Zac O'Brien	Brisbane Lions	Essendon	VFL	
2	24	James Battersby	Adelaide	Sturt	SANFL	
2	25	Kayne Turner	North Melbourne	Wodonga	O&M	
2	26	Patrick Ambrose	Essendon	Old Xaverians	VAFA	
2	27	Anthony Miles	Richmond	Greater Western Sydney	AFL	
2	28	Cameron Wood	Carlton	Williamstown	VFL	
2	29	Sam Gray	Port Adelaide	Port Adelaide	SANFL	
2	30	Passed	Sydney	—	—	
2	31	Nick Bourke	Geelong	Geelong Falcons	TAC Cup	
2	32	Tom Vandeleur	Fremantle	South Fremantle	WAFL	
2	33	Derick Wanganeen	Hawthorn	Box Hill	VFL	
3	34	Passed	Greater Western Sydney	—	—	
3	35	Alexis Georgiou	Melbourne	Norwood	SANFL	
3	36	Jason Holmes	St Kilda	—	—	International player
3	37	Passed	Gold Coast	—	—	
3	38	Murray Newman	West Coast	West Coast	AFL	
3	39	Passed	Brisbane Lions	—	—	
3	40	Jake Kelly	Adelaide	Oakleigh Chargers	TAC Cup	
3	41	Johnny Rayner	Essendon	—	—	3-year non-registered player
3	42	Matt Thomas	Richmond	Port Adelaide	AFL	
3	43	Blaine Johnson	Carlton	South Fremantle	WAFL	
3	44	Brent Renouf	Port Adelaide	Port Adelaide	AFL	
3	45	Patrick Mitchell	Sydney	—	—	International player
3	46	Zachary Bates	Geelong	West Adelaide	SANFL	
3	47	Jacob Ballard	Fremantle	Northern Blues	VFL	
3	48	Zac Webster	Hawthorn	Glenorchy	Glenorchy	
4	49	Passed	Greater Western Sydney	—	—	
4	50	Neville Jetta	Melbourne	Melbourne	AFL	
4	51	Passed	Gold Coast	—	—	
4	52	Alex Spina	Adelaide	North Adelaide	SANFL	
4	53	Heath Scotland	Carlton	Carlton	AFL	
4	54	Daniel Flynn	Port Adelaide	Kildare	GAA	International player (Gaelic)
4	55	Lloyd Perris	Sydney	NSW/ACT Rams	TAC Cup	Academy player
4	56	Michael Luxford	Geelong	—	—	3-year non-registered player
4	57	Ben Ross	Hawthorn	North Melbourne	AFL	
5	58	Passed	Greater Western Sydney	—	—	
5	59	Passed	Gold Coast	—	—	
5	60	Ciarán Sheehan	Carlton	Cork	GAA	International player (gaelic)
5	61	Kurt Heatherley	Hawthorn	Sandringham Dragons	TAC Cup	International player
6	62	Passed	Greater Western Sydney	—	—	
6	63	Jarred Ellis	Gold Coast	Broadbeach	NEAFL	
6	64	Ciarán Byrne	Carlton	Louth	GAA	International player (gaelic)
6	65	Shem-Kalvin Tatupu	Hawthorn	Oakleigh Chargers	TAC Cup	International player
7	66	Passed	Greater Western Sydney	—	—	
8	67	Passed	Greater Western Sydney	—	—	
9	68	Passed	Greater Western Sydney	—	—	
10	69	Archie Smith	Brisbane Lions	Mount Gravatt	NEAFL	
