= Sam Gray (footballer, born 1992) =

Australian rules footballer

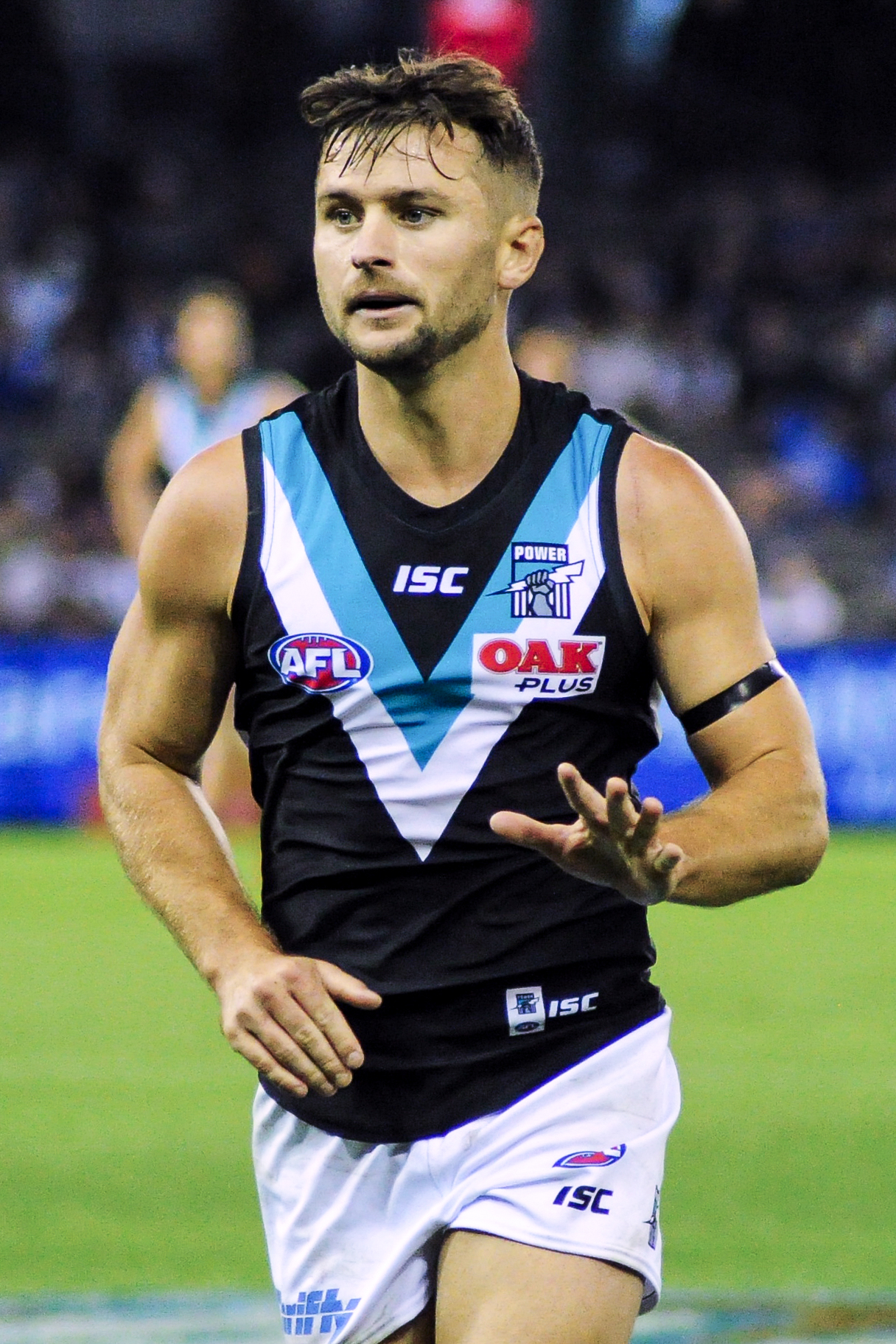
- Gray playing for Port Adelaide in June 2018

Personal information
- Born: 1 February 1992 (age 34); Cleve, South Australia
- Original team: Port Adelaide (SANFL)
- Draft: 2014 Rookie Draft, pick 29
- Height: 176 cm (5 ft 9 in)
- Weight: 76 kg (168 lb)
- Position: Medium Forward

Playing career^{1}
Years	Club	Games (Goals)
2014–2019	Port Adelaide	96 (83)
2020–2021	Sydney	7 (1)
Total		103 (84)
- ^{1} Playing statistics correct to the end of 2021.

Career highlights
- Port Adelaide SANFL Best and Fairest (2012)

Sam Gray (born 1 February 1992) is a former Australian rules footballer who last played for the Sydney Swans in the Australian Football League (AFL).

In 2013, whilst playing for Port Adelaide in the South Australian National Football League (SANFL), Gray was the runner-up in the Magarey Medal. He made his AFL debut in round 4 of the 2014 AFL season, after being elevated to the senior list when Mason Shaw was placed on the long-term injury list.

Gray was retained on Port's rookie list for the 2015 season and didn't play his first game of the season until round 8 where he played in 4 consecutive games as a small forward before being dropped back to the Magpies in the SANFL. He returned to the AFL team in round 18 where because of injuries to Port's midfield, Gray was given a chance to play predominantly in the middle. Gray finished strongly in the last 6 games of the season, averaging 35 disposals and collecting Brownlow Medal votes in the last 3 games. He was thus rewarded with a spot on Port's senior list for the 2016 season.

He had a career best game in round 23 of the 2017 AFL season where he kicked six goals and three behinds as well as collecting 25 disposals in Port Adelaide's 115 point thrashing of Gold Coast. Playing every game in 2017, Sam Gray kicked 28 goals – the third-highest for the Power. Gray also averaged 18 touches a game and has proved to be essential in Port’s make-up.

At the conclusion of the 2019 AFL season, Gray was delisted to allow him to explore his options as a free agent. He was signed by Sydney on 1 November.
