= Kyle Cheney (footballer) =

Australian rules footballer

Personal information
- Full name: Kyle Cheney
- Born: 25 August 1989 (age 37)
- Original teams: Warrack Eagles (WFL); North Ballarat Rebels (TAC Cup)
- Draft: No. 52, 2007 national draft
- Debut: Round 1, 2009, Melbourne vs. North Melbourne, at Melbourne Cricket Ground
- Height: 187 cm (6 ft 2 in)
- Weight: 93 kg (205 lb)
- Position: Medium defender, midfielder

Playing career^{1}
Years	Club	Games (Goals)
2008–2010	Melbourne	14 (0)
2011–2014	Hawthorn	27 (2)
2015–2018	Adelaide	44 (0)
Total		85 (2)
- ^{1} Playing statistics correct to the end of 2018.

Career highlights
- VFL premiership player: 2013; Col Austen Trophy: 2013

Kyle Cheney (/ˈtʃiːniː/ CHEE-nee; born 25 August 1989) is a former Australian rules football player who played with the Melbourne Football Club, Hawthorn Football Club, and Adelaide Football Club in the Australian Football League. Cheney was recruited from the North Ballarat Rebels by Melbourne with pick 53 in the 2007 National Draft after finishing second in Rebels' best and fairest count that year. He was traded to Hawthorn after the 2010 season, and then to Adelaide at the end of 2014.

== AFL career ==
=== Melbourne (2008–2010) ===
Cheney played the whole 2008 season for Sandringham in the VFL. He made his AFL debut in the first round of the 2009 season, and was among his side's best in a 34-point loss to North Melbourne. He played 12 matches for Melbourne in 2009 but only two in 2010, playing the rest of the season with the Casey Scorpions and winning their player of the year award that year. At the end of the 2010 season, Cheney was traded to Hawthorn along with pick 66 for pick 52. He played his last game for Melbourne after being traded, an exhibition match against the Brisbane Lions in China.

=== Hawthorn (2011–2014) ===
Cheney played his first game for Hawthorn midway through 2011, against Fremantle. He played in eight games that season, kicking his first AFL goal against Essendon, and six matches in 2012. In 2013 Cheney played just four AFL games due to the form of his teammates in a premiership year for the club. He played the rest of the year with Hawthorn's VFL affiliate, the Box Hill Hawks, and won the best and fairest award for Box Hill, averaging 17.8 disposals and 7.7 marks playing in defence and helping Box Hill win the VFL premiership that year. In 2014, Cheney played the opening nine games of the season as a key defender for the injury-hit Hawks, before failing to break into the side for the rest of the season. At the end of the season, he was traded to Adelaide in the last few minutes of the trading period, along with teammate Luke Lowden and draft picks 43 and 47, in exchange for picks 31, 50 and 68.

=== Adelaide (2015–2018) ===
Cheney played an equal career-best 12 games in his first season at Adelaide despite interruptions due to injury, thriving as a versatile defender with an average of 4.8 spoils per game (ranked second at the club) at 75.9% efficiency (first). At the end of the season, Cheney was issued with a warning by the AFL after unintentionally starting and facilitating an allegation that Western Bulldogs defender Michael Talia had shared sensitive information with his brother, Adelaide defender Daniel Talia, ahead of their two clubs meeting in the 2015 Second Elimination Final, an allegation the pair were cleared of. Kyle was Delisted at the end of the 2018 season.

== Statistics ==
Legend
G	Goals	K	Kicks	D	Disposals	T	Tackles
B	Behinds	H	Handballs	M	Marks

Season	Team	No.	Games	Totals							Averages (per game)							Votes
Season	Team	No.	Games	G	B	K	H	D	M	T	G	B	K	H	D	M	T	Votes
2008	Melbourne	25	0	—	—	—	—	—	—	—	—	—	—	—	—	—	—	0
2009	Melbourne	25	12	0	0	89	102	191	64	20	0.0	0.0	7.4	8.5	15.9	5.3	1.7	0
2010	Melbourne	25	2	0	0	17	7	24	11	3	0.0	0.0	8.5	3.5	12.0	5.5	1.5	0
2011	Hawthorn	13	8	1	0	57	52	109	38	5	0.1	0.0	7.1	6.5	13.6	4.8	0.6	0
2012	Hawthorn	13	6	1	1	24	37	61	17	12	0.2	0.2	4.0	6.2	10.2	2.8	2.0	0
2013	Hawthorn	13	4	0	1	30	23	53	14	9	0.0	0.3	7.5	5.8	13.3	3.5	2.3	0
2014	Hawthorn	13	9	0	0	81	56	137	37	12	0.0	0.0	9.0	6.2	15.2	4.1	1.3	0
2015	Adelaide	25	12	0	0	116	46	162	57	23	0.0	0.0	9.7	3.8	13.5	4.8	1.9	0
2016	Adelaide	25	24	0	1	193	131	324	125	37	0.0	0.0	8.0	5.5	13.5	5.2	1.5	0
2017	Adelaide	25	0	—	—	—	—	—	—	—	—	—	—	—	—	—	—	0
2018	Adelaide	25	8	0	0	84	28	112	44	4	0.0	0.0	10.5	3.5	14.0	5.5	0.5	0
Career			85	2	3	691	482	1173	407	125	0.0	0.0	8.1	5.7	13.8	4.8	1.5	0

== Honours and achievements ==
Team

- 2× Minor premiership (Hawthorn): 2012, 2013
- VFL premiership player (Box Hill): 2013

Individual

- Col Austen Trophy: 2013
- Box Hill Hawks All–Stars team (1999–2019)
