= Tim O'Brien (footballer) =

Australian rules footballer

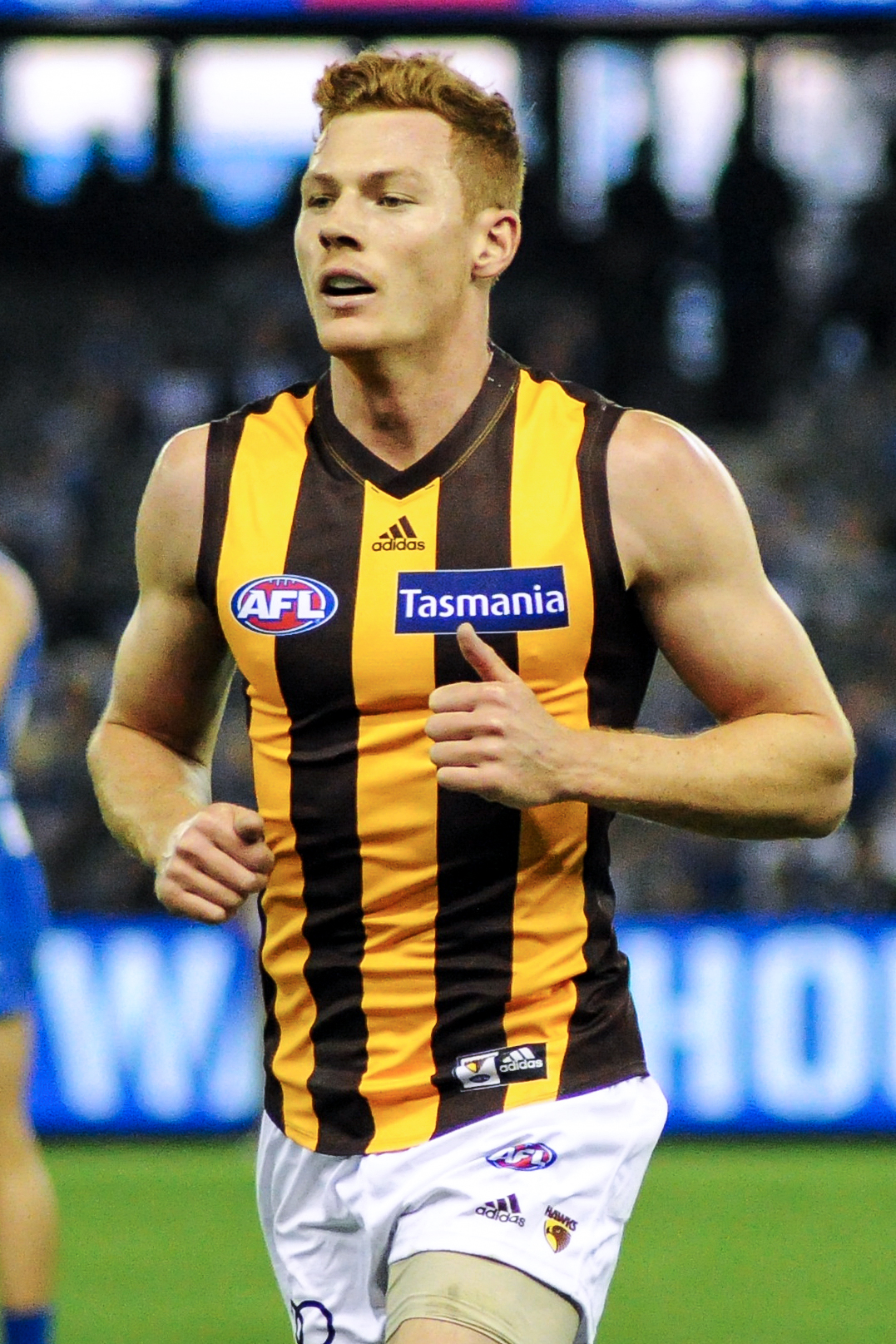
- O'Brien playing for Hawthorn in April 2018

Personal information
- Full name: Tim O'Brien
- Nicknames: Tobster, Red Buddy
- Born: 28 March 1994 (age 32); Mount Gambier, South Australia
- Original teams: West Gambier, Glenelg
- Draft: No. 28, 2012 national draft
- Debut: Round 1, 2014, Hawthorn vs. Brisbane Lions, at Aurora Stadium
- Height: 193 cm (6 ft 4 in)
- Weight: 83 kg (183 lb)
- Position: Utility

Playing career^{1}
Years	Club	Games (Goals)
2013–2021	Hawthorn	97 (73)
2022–2023	Western Bulldogs	18 (1)
Total		115 (74)
- ^{1} Playing statistics correct to the end of 2023.

Career highlights
- 2× VFL premiership player: 2013, 2018

Tim O'Brien (born 28 March 1994) is a professional Australian rules footballer who last played for the Western Bulldogs in the Australian Football League. A tall utility player, O'Brien is known for his high leaping for high marks.

== Early career ==
The red-headed O'Brien used to make 10-hour return car trip to Glenelg to play under-15 games. At 16 he played in his first West Gambier senior premiership in the Western Border league. West won again the following year with O'Brien playing in the ruck. He has a terrific mark and good leg speed, where he recorded the third-best result in agility draft camp.

== AFL career ==
Hawthorn selected O'Brien with pick 28 in the 2012 AFL draft.

He spent 2013 developing in the VFL playing for Hawthorn's reserve affiliate side, the Box Hill, and was a member of their premiership winning side.

Entering into his second season, O'Brien changed from number 40 to Hawthorn's famous number 23 guernsey previously worn by Lance Franklin following the latter's move to Sydney at the end of the 2013 season.

On August 22, 2017, after having a career-best season, O'Brien signed a two-year contract extension keeping him at Hawthorn until the end of 2019.

At the end of the 2021 AFL season, O'Brien exercised his rights as a free agent and joined the Western Bulldogs. He played for the Bulldogs for two seasons, before being delisted in September 2023.

== Statistics ==
Updated to the end of 2023.

Legend
G	Goals	K	Kicks	D	Disposals	T	Tackles
B	Behinds	H	Handballs	M	Marks

Season	Team	No.	Games	Totals							Averages (per game)							Votes
Season	Team	No.	Games	G	B	K	H	D	M	T	G	B	K	H	D	M	T	Votes
2013	Hawthorn	40	0	—	—	—	—	—	—	—	—	—	—	—	—	—	—	0
2014	Hawthorn	23	4	2	0	11	14	25	9	9	0.5	0.0	2.8	3.5	6.3	2.3	2.3	0
2015	Hawthorn	23	0	—	—	—	—	—	—	—	—	—	—	—	—	—	—	0
2016	Hawthorn	23	14	12	8	69	54	123	39	31	0.9	0.6	4.9	3.9	8.8	2.8	2.2	0
2017	Hawthorn	23	16	19	6	124	48	172	70	38	1.2	0.4	7.8	3.0	10.8	4.4	2.4	0
2018	Hawthorn	23	12	4	6	88	44	132	38	17	0.3	0.5	7.3	3.7	11.0	3.2	1.4	0
2019	Hawthorn	23	16	12	9	141	63	204	71	22	0.8	0.6	8.8	3.9	12.8	4.4	1.4	2
2020 (Note: The 2020 season was played with 17 home-and-away matches per team (down from 22) and 16-minute quarters with time on (down from 20-minute quarters with time on) due to the impact of the COVID-19 pandemic.)	Hawthorn	23	16	12	3	82	34	116	47	28	0.8	0.2	5.1	2.1	7.3	2.9	1.8	0
2021	Hawthorn	23	19	12	5	147	72	219	90	32	0.6	0.3	7.7	3.8	11.5	4.7	1.7	0
2022	Western Bulldogs	22	11	1	0	89	37	126	64	10	0.1	0.0	8.1	3.4	11.5	5.8	0.9	0
2023	Western Bulldogs	22	7	0	0	63	17	80	36	9	0.0	0.0	9.0	2.4	11.4	5.1	1.3	0
Career			115	74	37	814	383	1197	464	196	0.6	0.3	7.1	3.3	10.4	4.0	1.7	2

== Honours and achievements ==
Box Hill

- 2× VFL premiership player: 2013, 2018
- Minor premiership: 2015
