= Angus Dewar =

Australian rules footballer

Personal information
- Full name: Angus Dewar (formerly Litherland)
- Born: 12 October 1992 (age 34); Perth, Western Australia
- Original teams: Ongerup, Claremont
- Draft: No. 55, 2010 national draft
- Debut: Round 2, 2014, Hawthorn vs. Essendon, at Etihad Stadium
- Height: 192 cm (6 ft 4 in)
- Weight: 90 kg (198 lb)
- Position: Defender

Playing career^{1}
Years	Club	Games (Goals)
2011–2016	Hawthorn	25 (1)
2022	West Coast	1 (0)
- ^{1} Playing statistics correct to the end of 2022.

Career highlights
- VFL premiership player: 2013; 3x WAFL premiership player: 2018, 2019, 2021

Angus Dewar (born 12 October 1992, formerly known as Angus Litherland) is a professional Australian rules footballer who played for the Hawthorn Football Club in the Australian Football League (AFL). In 2022 he returned to the AFL as a top-up player for West Coast when numerous players were excluded from the team for to COVID-19 related health and safety protocols.

== AFL career ==
Hawthorn selected Dewar with pick 55 in the 2010 AFL draft. He was drafted as a tall defender from Claremont, and represented Western Australia at the 2010 AFL Under 18 Championships. A foot injury finished his 2011 season whilst developing at Hawthorn's affiliate club Box Hill. He spent 2013 developing in the VFL playing for Hawthorn's affiliate side Box Hill and was a member of their premiership winning side. Dewar made his AFL debut against Essendon in Round 2, 2014 as a late replacement for Sam Mitchell.

Dewar was used as a defender for the Hawks, he had a booming right foot kick and had plenty of dash off the half back line. Finding it difficult to break into a premiership winning side, Gus managed to play half a dozen games a season. In 2016 he started the year in the side only to drop out and ended the year with the Box Hill Hawks. At the conclusion of the 2016 season, he was delisted by Hawthorn. In 2022, as a COVID-19 top-up player on the West Coast Eagles list, he played one game against the North Melbourne Kangaroos. Dewar now plays for Subiaco in the WAFL where he has won three premierships.

== Statistics ==
Legend
G	Goals	K	Kicks	D	Disposals	T	Tackles
B	Behinds	H	Handballs	M	Marks

Season	Team	No.	Games	Totals							Averages (per game)							Votes
Season	Team	No.	Games	G	B	K	H	D	M	T	G	B	K	H	D	M	T	Votes
2011	Hawthorn	42	0	—	—	—	—	—	—	—	—	—	—	—	—	—	—	0
2012	Hawthorn	42	0	—	—	—	—	—	—	—	—	—	—	—	—	—	—	0
2013	Hawthorn	31	0	—	—	—	—	—	—	—	—	—	—	—	—	—	—	0
2014	Hawthorn	31	13	0	1	96	65	161	37	25	0.0	0.1	7.4	5.0	12.4	2.9	1.9	0
2015	Hawthorn	31	6	1	0	38	26	64	22	5	0.2	0.0	6.3	4.3	10.7	3.7	0.8	0
2016	Hawthorn	17	6	0	0	30	32	62	15	15	0.0	0.0	5.0	5.3	10.3	2.5	2.5	0
Career			25	1	1	164	123	287	74	45	0.0	0.0	6.6	4.9	11.5	3.0	1.8	0

== Honours and achievements ==
Team

- VFL premiership player (Box Hill): 2013
- Minor premiership (Box Hill): 2015
