= Jonathon Ceglar =

Australian rules footballer (born 1991)

Jon Ceglar
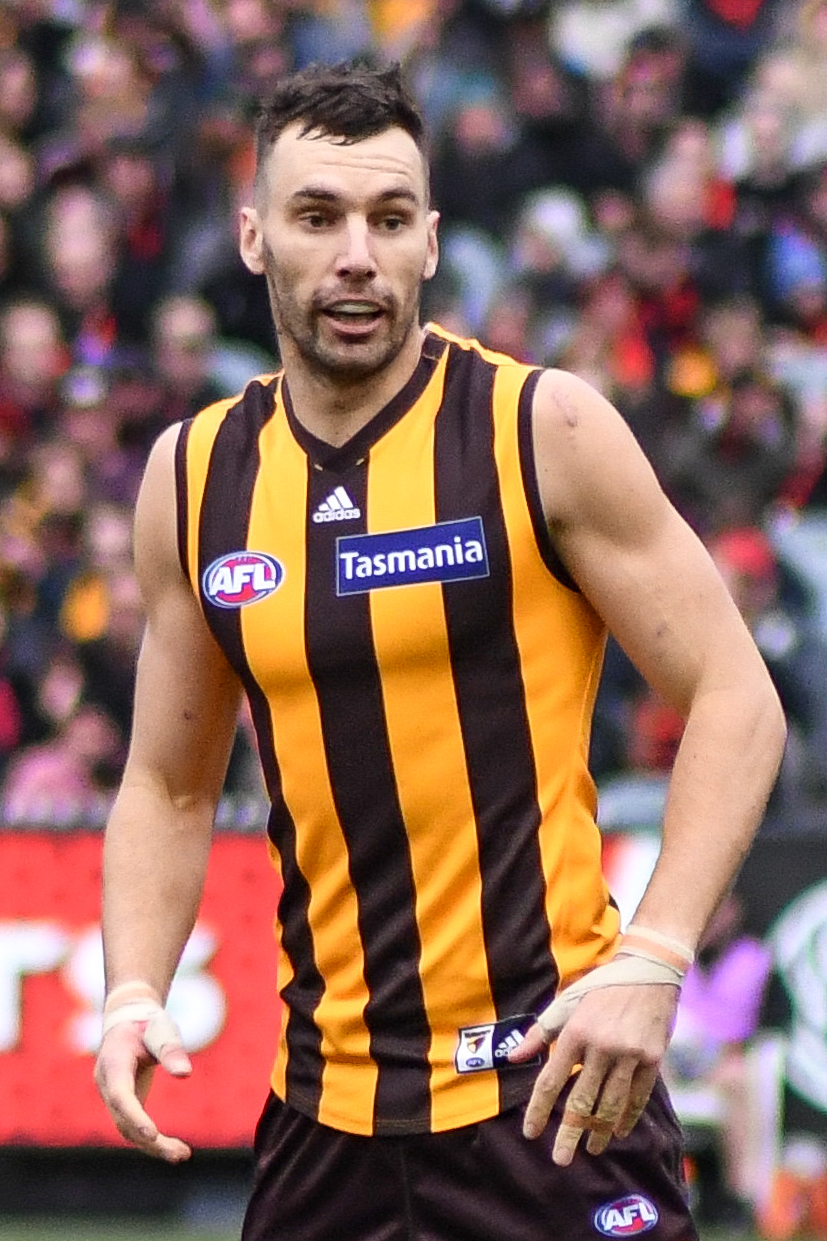
- Ceglar with Hawthorn in August 2018

Personal information
- Full name: Jonathon Ceglar
- Born: 14 February 1991 (age 35)
- Original team: Murray Bushrangers
- Debut: Round 14, 2013, Hawthorn vs. Brisbane Lions, at Aurora Stadium
- Height: 204 cm (6 ft 8 in)
- Weight: 102 kg (225 lb)
- Position: Ruckman/Forward

Playing career^{1}
Years	Club	Games (Goals)
2013-2021	Hawthorn	101 (43)
2022–2023	Geelong	9 (0)
- ^{1} Playing statistics correct to the end of the 2023 season.

Career highlights
- VFL premiership player: 2013

Jonathon Ceglar (born 14 February 1991) is a former Australian rules football player who played for the Hawthorn Football Club and Geelong Football Club in the Australian Football League (AFL). Ceglar was also listed with the Collingwood Football Club but did not play a game for them.

== Early career ==
In 2010 he was acquired by the Collingwood Football Club as part of a trade involving Pick 25, after being pre-listed by Gold Coast. Ceglar was a major contributor to Vic Country's win in the AFL Under 18 Championships.

== AFL career ==
Ceglar was picked up by Hawthorn as a rookie in the 2012 AFL Rookie Draft with their 15th pick. After being elevated off the Rookie list Ceglar made his debut against the Brisbane Lions in Launceston in round 14, 2013. He played a second game against Richmond in which he kicked his first goal.

He was promoted to the main player list with selection 59 in the 2013 AFL draft. He became a senior team regular in the 2014 season and played 15 games, including the Qualifying and Preliminary Finals, and was replaced by Ben McEvoy in Hawthorn's winning Grand Final team.

In the 2015 season he played the first 13 games, and was hampered by injury in the second half. Ceglar signed a two-year contract extension, which ensured that he remained remain a Hawk until the end of 2017.

While playing his 50th game against West Coast he ruptured the anterior cruciate ligament in his knee in the penultimate round of the 2016 season requiring a reconstruction.

On 7 September 2017 Ceglar signed a two-year contract extension keeping him at Hawthorn until the end of 2019.

He returned to senior football in 2018, sharing the ruck duties with Ben McEvoy until McEvoy was injured. Following said injury, Ceglar became Hawthorn's primary ruckman for the rest of the season.

Following the 2021 AFL season, Ceglar was traded to Geelong. .

== Statistics ==
Legend
G	Goals	K	Kicks	D	Disposals	T	Tackles
B	Behinds	H	Handballs	M	Marks	H/O	Hit-outs

Season	Team	No.	Games	Totals								Averages (per game)								Votes
Season	Team	No.	Games	G	B	K	H	D	M	T	H/O	G	B	K	H	D	M	T	H/O	Votes
2011	Collingwood	29	0	—	—	—	—	—	—	—	—	—	—	—	—	—	—	—	—	0
2012	Collingwood	29	0	—	—	—	—	—	—	—	—	—	—	—	—	—	—	—	—	0
2013	Hawthorn	47	2	1	1	8	3	11	3	3	27	0.5	0.5	4.0	1.5	5.5	1.5	1.5	13.5	0
2014	Hawthorn	18	15	8	3	79	99	178	50	28	284	0.5	0.2	5.3	6.6	11.9	3.3	1.9	18.9	0
2015	Hawthorn	18	14	6	5	69	90	159	42	45	325	0.4	0.4	4.9	6.4	11.4	3.0	3.2	23.2	0
2016	Hawthorn	18	19	14	8	94	105	199	57	50	406	0.7	0.4	5.0	5.5	10.5	3.0	2.6	21.4	0
2017	Hawthorn	18	0	—	—	—	—	—	—	—	—	—	—	—	—	—	—	—	—	0
2018	Hawthorn	18	11	6	1	48	60	108	34	20	239	0.5	0.1	4.4	5.5	9.8	3.1	1.8	21.7	0
2019	Hawthorn	18	15	5	6	85	115	200	69	34	306	0.3	0.4	5.7	7.7	13.3	4.6	2.3	20.4	0
2020 (Note: The 2020 season was played with 17 home-and-away matches per team (down from 22) and 16-minute quarters with time on (down from 20-minute quarters with time on) due to the impact of the COVID-19 pandemic.)	Hawthorn	18	13	1	0	55	82	137	29	32	274	0.1	0.0	4.2	6.3	10.5	2.2	2.5	21.1	2
2021	Hawthorn	18	12	2	2	67	113	180	53	26	249	0.2	0.2	5.6	9.4	15.0	4.4	2.2	20.8	2
2022	Geelong	15	3	0	0	16	19	35	2	2	47	0.0	0.0	5.3	6.3	11.7	0.7	0.7	15.7	0
2023	Geelong	15	6	0	0	34	42	76	21	8	153	0.0	0.0	5.7	7.0	12.7	3.5	1.3	25.5	0
Career			110	43	26	555	728	1283	360	248	2310	0.4	0.2	5.0	6.6	11.7	3.3	2.3	21.0	4

== Honours and achievements ==
Team

- Minor premiership (Hawthorn): 2013
- Minor premiership (Geelong): 2022
- VFL premiership player (Box Hill): 2013
- Minor premiership (Box Hill): 2015

Individual

- Hawthorn best clubman: 2019
