= Alex Woodward =

Australian rules footballer (born 1993)

Personal information
- Full name: Alex Woodward
- Born: 11 June 1993 (age 33)
- Original team: Sandringham Dragons (TAC Cup)
- Draft: No. 53, 2011 national draft
- Debut: Round 18, 2014, Hawthorn vs. Sydney, at Melbourne Cricket Ground
- Height: 181 cm (5 ft 11 in)
- Weight: 77 kg (170 lb)

Playing career^{1}
Years	Club	Games (Goals)
2012–2016	Hawthorn	2 (0)
- ^{1} Playing statistics correct to the end of 2016.

Career highlights
- J. J. Liston Trophy: 2014

Alex Woodward (born 11 June 1993) is a professional Australian rules footballer who played for the Hawthorn Football Club in the Australian Football League (AFL). He attended Mazenod College and played junior football for Noble Park and Dingley.

== Football career ==
He was drafted by Hawthorn Football Club with pick 53 in 2011 AFL draft from the Sandringham Dragons in the TAC Cup. Whilst on Hawthorn's list, Woodward twice ruptured his anterior cruciate ligament (ACL) in his right knee and has had three knee reconstructions. Woodward has played primarily for Box Hill Hawks in VFL and finally made his AFL debut in round 18, 2014.

After competing his first full year of football in three years, Woodward's hard work was rewarded with winning the J. J. Liston Trophy for 2014. He polled 20 votes.

Woodward tore the ACL in his right knee early in Box Hill Hawks’ match against Coburg in the VFL in July 2015.

Woodward was delisted at the conclusion of the 2015 season; however, he was re-drafted in the 2016 rookie draft with the 52nd selection. At the conclusion of the 2016 season, he was delisted again by Hawthorn.

In 2017, he joined the Collingwood VFL team but ruptured his ACL again in his third game for the club, ironically against Box Hill. He returned strongly with the club in mid-2018, and managed to finish third in the J. J. Liston Trophy despite playing only eight games for the year.

Woodward also served as a runner for the Collingwood AFL team during the year, and controversially became involved in the play during the 2018 AFL Grand Final to Collingwood's detriment. Late in the third quarter, Collingwood's Taylor Adams miskicked an attempted clearing kick towards centre half back; West Coast's Elliot Yeo and Collingwood's Jaidyn Stephenson would both have had the opportunity to contest the miskick, but Woodward inadvertently blocked Stephenson's path, allowing Yeo to take the mark uncontested and kick a goal. The goal gave West Coast the lead for the first time since early in the game, and West Coast went on to win by five points.

In August 2019, following his 5th ACL injury, Woodward announced his retirement from playing football altogether.

== Statistics ==
Legend
G	Goals	K	Kicks	D	Disposals	T	Tackles
B	Behinds	H	Handballs	M	Marks

Season	Team	No.	Games	Totals							Averages (per game)							Votes
Season	Team	No.	Games	G	B	K	H	D	M	T	G	B	K	H	D	M	T	Votes
2012	Hawthorn	36	0	—	—	—	—	—	—	—	—	—	—	—	—	—	—	0
2013	Hawthorn	36	0	—	—	—	—	—	—	—	—	—	—	—	—	—	—	0
2014	Hawthorn	39	2	0	1	6	12	18	1	8	0.0	0.5	3.0	6.0	9.0	0.5	4.0	0
2015	Hawthorn	39	0	—	—	—	—	—	—	—	—	—	—	—	—	—	—	0
2016	Hawthorn	39	0	—	—	—	—	—	—	—	—	—	—	—	—	—	—	0
Career			2	0	1	6	12	18	1	8	0.0	0.5	3.0	6.0	9.0	0.5	4.0	0

== Honours and achievements ==
Team

- Minor premiership (Box Hill): 2015

Individual

- J.J. Liston Trophy: 2014
