= Kurt Heatherley =

Australian rugby union footballer

Personal information
- Born: 1 January 1995 (age 31); Tauranga, New Zealand
- Original team: Sandringham Dragons (TAC Cup)
- Draft: No. 61, 2014 rookie draft
- Debut: Round 20, 2016, Hawthorn vs. Melbourne, at Melbourne Cricket Ground
- Height: 193 cm (6 ft 4 in)
- Weight: 89 kg (196 lb)
- Position: Defender

Playing career^{1}
Years	Club	Games (Goals)
2014–2018	Hawthorn	5 (0)
- ^{1} Playing statistics correct to the end of 2018.

Career highlights
- New Zealand National Team 2014; New Zealand U16 team 2012

Kurt Heatherley (born 1 January 1995) is a professional rugby union player for Jersey Reds. He previously played rugby union for Auckland and played Australian rules football for the Hawthorn Football Club in the Australian Football League (AFL). A key defender originally from Tauranga in New Zealand, Hawthorn recruited him as a sixteen year old in 2011.

== Early life ==
Heatherley was born in Hamilton, New Zealand and attended St Paul's Collegiate School.

He was scouted by the Hawthorn Football club recruiter Graham Wright while playing for New Zealand at the FIBA Oceania Under-16 Championship in Tasmania. Heatherley, still at school as a 16 year old, had been a competent basketball and rugby union player he was chosen for his athletic qualities, particularly his pace, jump and height. He also represented Australian rules in for the New Zealand U16 national team. He was invited by Hawthorn to the 2012 AFL Draft Combine. After an outstanding performance at the Combine, Hawthorn convinced Heatherley to relocate to Melbourne where he would complete his secondary schooling at Caulfield Grammar. In 2014 he also represented New Zealand national side against the AFL Academy.

== Australian rules football career ==
He was formally recruited by Hawthorn as an international recruit with their fifth selection and sixty-first overall in the 2014 rookie draft.

This gave him the chance to development his game through school, the TAC cup and the VFL.

He was promoted to the main list in 2015 after consistent performances playing for Box Hill Hawks in the VFL having participated in a Minor premiership in the 2015. He made his debut as a late replacement against Melbourne in round 20, 2016 at the Melbourne Cricket Ground. Following the 2018 season, Heatherley was delisted. Although he wanted to continue in AFL, he was not offered an opportunity with any other club.

== Statistics ==
Legend
G	Goals	K	Kicks	D	Disposals	T	Tackles
B	Behinds	H	Handballs	M	Marks

Season	Team	No.	Games	Totals							Averages (per game)							Votes
Season	Team	No.	Games	G	B	K	H	D	M	T	G	B	K	H	D	M	T	Votes
2014	Hawthorn	46	0	—	—	—	—	—	—	—	—	—	—	—	—	—	—	0
2015	Hawthorn	34	0	—	—	—	—	—	—	—	—	—	—	—	—	—	—	
2016	Hawthorn	34	1	0	0	6	5	11	6	2	0.0	0.0	6.0	5.0	11.0	6.0	2.0	0
2017	Hawthorn	34	4	0	0	25	22	47	18	7	0.0	0.0	6.3	5.5	11.8	4.5	1.8	0
2018	Hawthorn	34	0	—	—	—	—	—	—	—	—	—	—	—	—	—	—	0
Career			5	0	0	31	27	58	24	9	0.0	0.0	6.2	5.4	11.6	4.8	1.8	0

== Rugby Union career ==
In 2019, Heatherley changed sports to rugby union, joining Auckland in New Zealand's Mitre 10 Cup.

He joined English Championship side Jersey Reds ahead of the 2020–21 season.
