= Dallas Willsmore =

Australian rules footballer (born 1995)

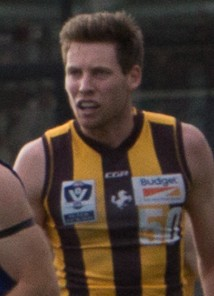
- Willsmore playing for Box Hill in 2018

Personal information
- Full name: Dallas Willsmore
- Born: 29 May 1995 (age 31); Underbool, Victoria
- Original team: Walpeup-Underbool
- Draft: No. 17, 2014 rookie draft
- Debut: Round 10, 2017, Hawthorn vs. Sydney, at Sydney Cricket Ground
- Height: 191 cm (6 ft 3 in)
- Weight: 85 kg (187 lb)
- Position: Midfielder

Playing career^{1}
Years	Club	Games (Goals)
2014–2018	Hawthorn	2 (0)
- ^{1} Playing statistics correct to the end of 2018.

Career highlights
- VFL premiership player: 2018

Dallas Willsmore (born 29 May 1995) is a former professional Australian rules footballer who played for the Hawthorn Football Club in the Australian Football League.

Willsmore hails from the small Mallee township of Underbool, Victoria. Willsmore was drafted by Hawthorn with their first selection and seventeenth overall in the 2014 rookie draft.

A tall and versatile wingman, Willsmore spent four years in the system before making his debut against Sydney on the SCG.

He was delisted by Hawthorn at the conclusion of 2017. Hawthorn would re-rookie him with pick 34 in the 2018 AFL rookie draft.

Willsmore played the 2018 season with Box Hill, failing to break into the Hawthorn senior side, he kicked an important goal in the 2018 VFL Grand Final.

Following the 2018 season, Willsmore was delisted again.

== Statistics ==
Legend
G	Goals	K	Kicks	D	Disposals	T	Tackles
B	Behinds	H	Handballs	M	Marks

Season	Team	No.	Games	Totals							Averages (per game)							Votes
Season	Team	No.	Games	G	B	K	H	D	M	T	G	B	K	H	D	M	T	Votes
2014	Hawthorn	43	0	—	—	—	—	—	—	—	—	—	—	—	—	—	—	0
2015	Hawthorn	43	0	—	—	—	—	—	—	—	—	—	—	—	—	—	—	0
2016	Hawthorn	20	0	—	—	—	—	—	—	—	—	—	—	—	—	—	—	0
2017	Hawthorn	20	2	0	0	12	7	19	9	7	0.0	0.0	6.0	3.5	9.5	4.5	3.5	0
2018	Hawthorn	20	0	—	—	—	—	—	—	—	—	—	—	—	—	—	—	0
Career			2	0	0	12	7	19	9	7	0.0	0.0	6.0	3.5	9.5	4.5	3.5	0

== Honours and achievements ==
Team

- VFL premiership player (Box Hill): 2018
- Minor premiership (Box Hill): 2015
