= Billy Hartung (footballer) =

Australian rules footballer (born 1995)

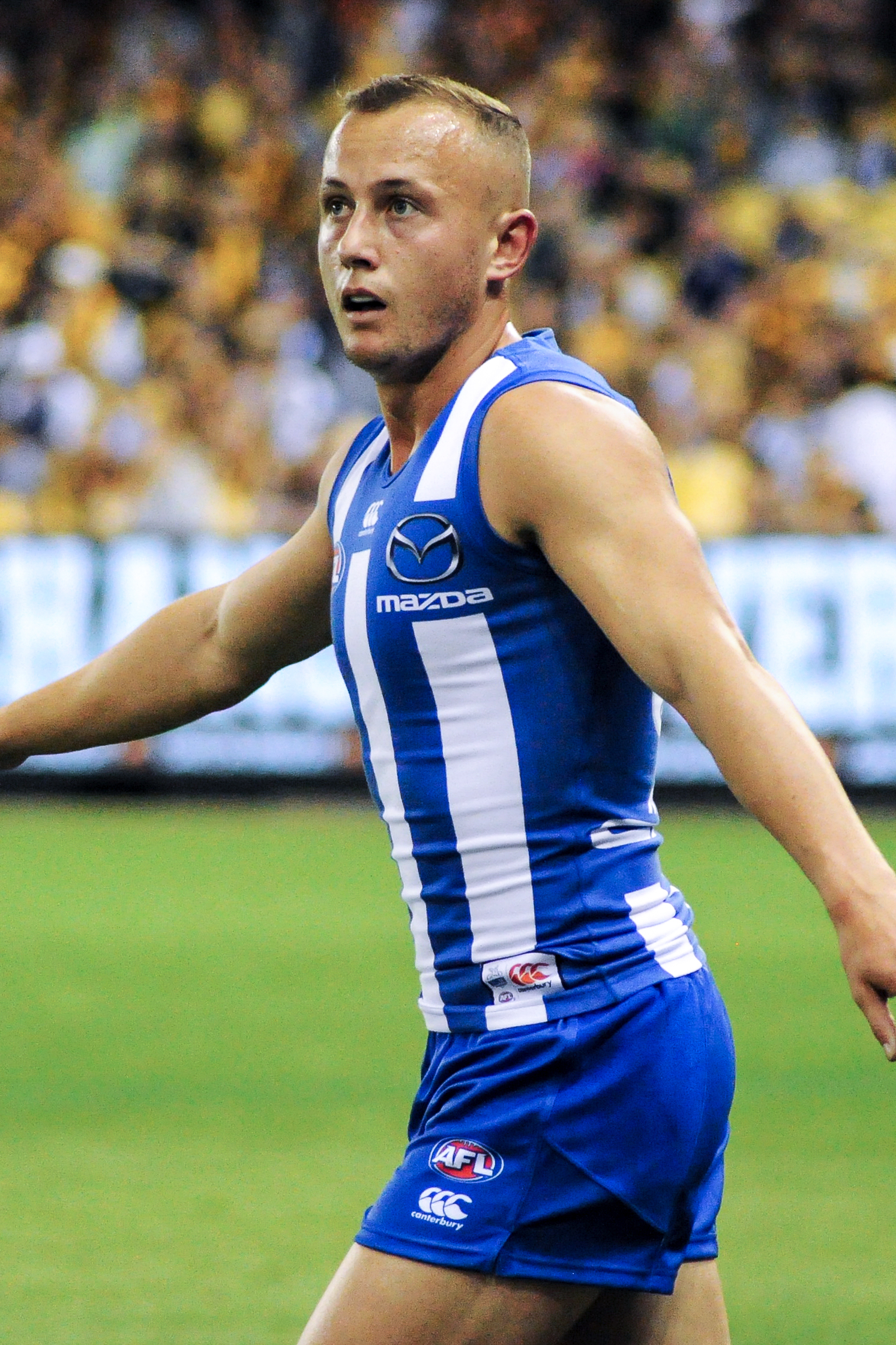
- Hartung playing for North Melbourne in April 2018

Personal information
- Full name: William Hartung
- Born: 24 January 1995 (age 31)
- Original team: Dandenong Stingrays (TAC Cup)
- Draft: No. 24, 2013 national draft
- Debut: Round 7, 2014, Hawthorn vs. St Kilda, at Melbourne Cricket Ground
- Height: 167 cm (5 ft 6 in)
- Weight: 78 kg (172 lb)
- Position: Midfielder

Club information
- Current club: North Adelaide
- Number: 24

Playing career^{1}
Years	Club	Games (Goals)
2014–2017	Hawthorn	63 (27)
2018	North Melbourne	13 (6)
2020–	North Adelaide	8 (0)
- ^{1} Playing statistics correct to the end of 2021.

Career highlights
- Under 18 All–Australian team: 2013

William Hartung (born 24 January 1995) is an Australian rules football player who plays with the North Adelaide Football Club in the South Australian National Football League (SANFL). He previously played with the Hawthorn Football Club and the North Melbourne Football Club in the Australian Football League (AFL).

== Junior career ==
When Billy Hartung was 14 years old he set a Mornington Peninsula Junior Football League record for most goals kicked in a single game, kicking 20 goals straight while playing for the Red Hill under-14s against Dromana. Hartung progressed to the VSFL under 18 competition and played with the Dandenong Stingrays. Selected an All-Australian at under-18 level in 2013, Hartung attended the AFL Draft Combine in October 2013 when he ran a 16.6 beep test, breaking (future teammate) Bradley Hill’s record of 16.1.

== AFL career ==
Hawthorn selected Hartung with pick 24 in the 2013 AFL draft. He started 2014 developing in the VFL playing for Hawthorn's reserve affiliate side Box Hill. Good form lead to his promotion and senior debut against St Kilda. He played five consecutive games between rounds 8 and 12, before an elbow injury sustained against Sydney in round 12 meant that he missed a month of football, he returned to the VFL. He played in Box Hill's losing grand final side.

His dash and consistency earned him a 2015 AFL Rising Star nominee after a round seven match against Melbourne. He played 20 consecutive games in 2015, but after the preliminary final was dropped from Hawthorn's winning grand final team.

In October 2017, Hawthorn announced they would not extend his contract for the 2018 season. In the 2017 national draft, North Melbourne selected Hartung with pick No. 77.

Hartung was again delisted by North Melbourne at the end of the 2018 season.

== Post AFL ==
He started with VAFA Premier B club St Bedes Mentone Tigers in 2019, but played out the rest of the year with St Kilda City in the Southern league. He signed with North Adelaide for the 2020 season.

== Statistics ==
Legend
G	Goals	K	Kicks	D	Disposals	T	Tackles
B	Behinds	H	Handballs	M	Marks

Season	Team	No.	Games	Totals							Averages (per game)							Votes
Season	Team	No.	Games	G	B	K	H	D	M	T	G	B	K	H	D	M	T	Votes
2014	Hawthorn	40	7	3	1	46	33	79	21	9	0.4	0.1	6.6	4.7	11.3	3.0	1.3	0
2015	Hawthorn	40	20	11	4	174	142	316	66	24	0.6	0.2	8.6	7.1	15.8	3.3	1.2	0
2016	Hawthorn	4	18	8	5	199	151	350	66	39	0.4	0.3	11.1	8.4	19.4	3.7	2.2	0
2017	Hawthorn	4	18	5	7	211	186	397	99	29	0.3	0.4	11.7	10.3	22.1	5.5	1.6	0
2018	North Melbourne	39	13	6	4	109	117	226	48	35	0.5	0.3	8.4	9.0	17.4	3.7	2.7	0
Career			76	33	21	739	629	1368	300	136	0.4	0.3	9.7	8.3	18.0	4.0	1.8	0

== Honours and achievements ==
Individual

- Hawthorn most promising player: 2015
- AFL Rising Star nominee: 2015
- Under 18 All-Australian team: 2013
