= Luke Lowden =

Australian rules footballer (born 1991)

Personal information
- Full name: Luke Lowden
- Nickname: Sticks
- Born: 22 February 1991 (age 35)
- Original teams: Dookie United (PDFL); Wunghnu (PDFL); Shepparton (GVFL); Caulfield Grammar School; Sandringham Dragons (TAC Cup)
- Draft: No. 63, 2008 national draft
- Debut: Round 12, 2014, Hawthorn vs. West Coast, at Aurora Stadium
- Height: 206 cm (6 ft 9 in)
- Weight: 103 kg (16 st 3 lb; 227 lb)
- Position: Ruckman, key forward

Playing career^{1}
Years	Club	Games (Goals)
2009–2014	Hawthorn	1 (3)
2015–2016	Adelaide	0 (0)
- ^{1} Playing statistics correct to the end of 2016.

Career highlights
- VFL premiership player: 2013

Luke Lowden (born 22 February 1991) is a former professional Australian rules footballer who played for the Hawthorn Football Club in the Australian Football League (AFL). He was also listed with the Adelaide Football Club without playing a senior match. He was recruited by Hawthorn with pick 63 in the 2008 national draft from the Sandringham Dragons.

== Early life ==
Lowden's family moved from Sydney to Cosgrove, Victoria, near Shepparton, when he was 12. He played junior football for the Dookie United Football Club before moving to Melbourne to attend Caulfield Grammar School. He played in three TAC Cup games for the Sandringham Dragons in 2008, which led to him being drafted.

== AFL career ==
=== Hawthorn (2009–2014) ===
Lowden did not play for Hawthorn in his first few seasons, instead playing for their VFL affiliate side, Box Hill. Lowden began in Box Hill's reserves and was promoted to their senior side in 2010. He played in a premiership with Box Hill in 2013. Lowden finally made his AFL debut in round 12 of the 2014 season, against West Coast, and kicked three goals playing as a ruckman opposed to Dean Cox and Nic Naitanui. Despite his strong performance Lowden did not play another AFL game for the season, and at the end of the season sought greater opportunities at another club. He was traded to Adelaide in the 2014 trading period, along with teammate Kyle Cheney amongst a complicated exchange of draft picks also involving Geelong.

=== Adelaide (2015–2016) ===
Lowden suffered an Achilles injury in the 2015 pre-season that delayed his start to the season. He recovered to play 13 matches for Adelaide's reserves team in the SANFL, kicking 15 goals as a key forward with occasional stints in the ruck. He was delisted at the conclusion of the 2016 season.

== Statistics ==
Legend
G	Goals	K	Kicks	D	Disposals	T	Tackles
B	Behinds	H	Handballs	M	Marks	H/O	Hit-outs

Season	Team	No.	Games	Totals								Averages (per game)								Votes
Season	Team	No.	Games	G	B	K	H	D	M	T	H/O	G	B	K	H	D	M	T	H/O	Votes
2009	Hawthorn	38	0	—	—	—	—	—	—	—	—	—	—	—	—	—	—	—	—	0
2010	Hawthorn	38	0	—	—	—	—	—	—	—	—	—	—	—	—	—	—	—	—	0
2011	Hawthorn	30	0	—	—	—	—	—	—	—	—	—	—	—	—	—	—	—	—	0
2012	Hawthorn	30	0	—	—	—	—	—	—	—	—	—	—	—	—	—	—	—	—	0
2013	Hawthorn	30	0	—	—	—	—	—	—	—	—	—	—	—	—	—	—	—	—	0
2014	Hawthorn	30	1	3	0	6	6	12	0	2	15	3.0	0.0	6.0	6.0	12.0	0.0	2.0	15.0	0
2015	Adelaide	40	0	—	—	—	—	—	—	—	—	—	—	—	—	—	—	—	—	0
2016	Adelaide	40	0	—	—	—	—	—	—	—	—	—	—	—	—	—	—	—	—	0
Career			1	3	0	6	6	12	0	2	15	3.0	0.0	6.0	6.0	12.0	0.0	2.0	15.0	0

== Honours and achievements ==
=== Team ===
- VFL premiership player (Box Hill): 2013
