= Ben Ross (Australian rules footballer) =

Australian rules footballer (born 1988)

Personal information
- Full name: Ben Ross
- Born: 21 September 1988 (age 38)
- Original team: Gippsland Power
- Draft: No. 3, 2007 pre-season draft
- Debut: Round 4, 2008, North Melbourne vs. Melbourne, at Melbourne Cricket Ground
- Height: 179 cm (5 ft 10 in)
- Weight: 74 kg (163 lb)
- Position: Forward

Playing career^{1}
| Years | Club | Games (Goals) |
| 2007–2011 | North Melbourne | 14 (4) |
| 2014 | Hawthorn | 4 (1) |
| Total | | 18 (5) |
- ^{1} Playing statistics correct to the end of 2014.

Ben Ross (born 21 September 1988) is an Australian rules footballer who played for the North Melbourne Football Club and the Hawthorn Football Club in the Australian Football League (AFL). He was rookie listed by Hawthorn in the 2013 AFL rookie draft after previously playing for North Melbourne between 2007 and 2011.

== Football career ==
=== North Melbourne ===
Ross was selected by the Kangaroos with pick 3 in the 2007 AFL pre-season draft. Ross initially broke into the senior team for the Round 4 win against Melbourne in 2007. He continued to play in other games during the season, picking up a career-high 21 possessions and a goal against Port Adelaide, before his year was cut short by injury. He played 9 out of 19 games in 2009.

Ross was delisted by North Melbourne at the end of 2011 after playing 14 games over four injury-interrupted seasons.

=== Werribee ===
He continued to play for Werribee in the Victorian Football League (VFL), winning the 2012 J. J. Liston Trophy as the best player in the league. He had a delayed start to the 2013 season because he went overseas for travel purposes hence he missed most of the pre-season training.

=== Hawthorn ===
He was selected by Hawthorn in the 2013 Rookie Draft. Ross was picked to make his debut for the Hawks against Carlton in Round 13, 2014 after being elevated off the rookie list because of a long-term injury to Jed Anderson. Ross, along with Jordan Kelly and Derick Wanganeen, were delisted by Hawthorn on 9 October 2014.

== Personal life ==
Ross is the grandson of Max Papley, a star player with Moorabbin, South Melbourne and Williamstown in the 1960s and 1970s. His brother, Michael Ross, was a midfielder at Essendon and his cousin, Tom Papley, currently plays for the Sydney Swans.

== Statistics ==
Legend
| G | Goals | K | Kicks | D | Disposals | T | Tackles |
| B | Behinds | H | Handballs | M | Marks |

| Season | Team | No. | Games | Totals | | | | | | | Averages (per game) | | | | | | | Votes |
| Season | Team | No. | Games | G | B | K | H | D | M | T | G | B | K | H | D | M | T | Votes |
|---|---|---|---|---|---|---|---|---|---|---|---|---|---|---|---|---|---|---|
| 2007 | Kangaroos | 33 | 0 | — | — | — | — | — | — | — | — | — | — | — | — | — | — | 0 |
| 2008 | North Melbourne | 15 | 3 | 2 | 2 | 24 | 12 | 36 | 8 | 5 | 0.7 | 0.7 | 8.0 | 4.0 | 12.0 | 2.7 | 1.7 | 0 |
| 2009 | North Melbourne | 15 | 9 | 2 | 7 | 80 | 75 | 155 | 31 | 28 | 0.2 | 0.8 | 8.9 | 8.3 | 17.2 | 3.4 | 3.1 | 0 |
| 2010 | North Melbourne | 15 | 2 | 0 | 0 | 11 | 15 | 26 | 7 | 3 | 0.0 | 0.0 | 5.5 | 7.5 | 13.0 | 3.5 | 1.5 | 0 |
| 2011 | North Melbourne | 15 | 0 | — | — | — | — | — | — | — | — | — | — | — | — | — | — | 0 |
| 2014 | Hawthorn | 21 | 4 | 1 | 0 | 17 | 13 | 30 | 8 | 3 | 0.3 | 0.0 | 4.3 | 3.3 | 7.5 | 2.0 | 0.8 | 0 |
| Career | | | 18 | 5 | 9 | 132 | 115 | 247 | 54 | 39 | 0.3 | 0.5 | 7.3 | 6.4 | 13.7 | 3.0 | 2.2 | 0 |

== Honours and achievements ==
Individual

- J.J. Liston Trophy: 2012
