= Derick Wanganeen =

Australian rules footballer

Personal information
- Full name: Derick Wanganeen
- Born: 5 February 1991 (age 35); Port Lincoln, South Australia
- Original teams: Mallee Park, Port Adelaide Magpies
- Draft: No. 52, 2011 rookie draft
- Debut: Round 1, 2014, Hawthorn vs. Brisbane Lions, at Aurora Stadium
- Height: 176 cm (5 ft 9 in)
- Weight: 75 kg (165 lb)
- Position: Defender

Playing career^{1}
Years	Club	Games (Goals)
2011–2014	Hawthorn	1 (0)
- ^{1} Playing statistics correct to the end of 2014.

Career highlights
- VFL premiership player: 2013

Derick Wanganeen (born 5 February 1991) is an Australian rules footballer who played for the Hawthorn Football Club.

Wanganeen was born in Port Lincoln, South Australia, and is the eldest of four children.

== Drafting ==
Drafted via the 2011 Rookie Draft, Wanganeen was unable to find consistency as a small forward in his early career but a late switch to the backline he found his niche and showed natural ability to read the play and then set up teammates with his disposal. He spent the maximum three years on Hawthorn's rookie list, but had to be delisted at the end of last season and then re-selected via the Rookie Draft at number 33.

He spent 2013 developing in the VFL and was rewarded with a Box Hill premiership. His development as a player was noticed by the Hawthorn coaching staff.

After an impressive pre-season, he was upgraded onto the primary list in place of the injured Brendan Whitecross. He made his AFL debut in Launceston, Tasmania against Brisbane Lions.

Wanganeen, along with Ben Ross and Jordan Kelly were delisted by Hawthorn on 9 October 2014.

== Statistics ==
Legend
G	Goals	K	Kicks	D	Disposals	T	Tackles
B	Behinds	H	Handballs	M	Marks

Season	Team	No.	Games	Totals							Averages (per game)							Votes
Season	Team	No.	Games	G	B	K	H	D	M	T	G	B	K	H	D	M	T	Votes
2011	Hawthorn	46	0	—	—	—	—	—	—	—	—	—	—	—	—	—	—	0
2012	Hawthorn	46	0	—	—	—	—	—	—	—	—	—	—	—	—	—	—	0
2013	Hawthorn	46	0	—	—	—	—	—	—	—	—	—	—	—	—	—	—	0
2014	Hawthorn	36	1	0	0	1	3	4	1	2	0.0	0.0	1.0	3.0	4.0	1.0	2.0	0
Career			1	0	0	1	3	4	1	2	0.0	0.0	1.0	3.0	4.0	1.0	2.0	0

== Honours and achievements ==
Team

- VFL premiership player (Box Hill): 2013
