= 2011 Carlton Football Club season =

Football season in Australia

Carlton Football Club
2011 season
- President: Stephen Kernahan
- Coach: Brett Ratten
- Captain: Chris Judd
- Home grounds: Etihad Stadium (Training and administrative: Visy Park)
- AFL season: 5th (14-7-1)
- Finals series: 5th
- Best and Fairest: Marc Murphy
- Leading goalkicker: Andrew Walker (56)
- Highest home attendance: 85,936 vs. Collingwood (Round 17)
- Lowest home attendance: 37,607 vs. Adelaide (Round 5)
- Club membership: 43,791

The 2011 Carlton Football Club season was the Carlton Football Club's 148th season of competition, and 115th as a member of the Australian Football League.

Carlton finished 5th out of 17 teams in the 2011 AFL season with a win-loss record of 14–7–1, ultimately eliminated after a three-point semi-final loss against West Coast.

== Club summary ==
The 2011 AFL season was the 115th season of the VFL/AFL competition since its inception in 1897; and, having competed in every season, it was also the 115th season contested by the Carlton Football Club.

Former club champion Stephen Kernahan continued as club president in the 2011 season, a position he has held since August 2008. The club's two joint major sponsors, car manufacturer Hyundai and confectionery company Mars, were unchanged from 2010. As in previous years, the club's primary home ground was Etihad Stadium, with home games expecting to draw larger crowds played at the M.C.G., and with traditional home ground Visy Park serving as the training and administrative base. As has been the case every year since 2003, Carlton has a full alignment with the Northern Bullants in the Victorian Football League, allowing Carlton-listed players to play with the Bullants when not selected in AFL matches.

Carlton set a new club record by selling 43,791 memberships for the 2011 season. The previous high of 42,408 members, set in 2009, was surpassed on 9 June. The club had the fourth-highest membership in the league, and the second-highest of clubs who play home games only in Victoria, behind only Collingwood.^{Note 1,} The club's membership campaign slogan for 2011 was "No passengers."

Brett Ratten and Chris Judd continued in their respective roles as senior coach and captain of the club, each entering his fourth season appointed to the job.^{Note 2} Kade Simpson continued in the role of vice-captain, and Michael Jamison and Andrew Carrazzo retained their places in the club's leadership group from 2010. Bryce Gibbs, Marc Murphy and Jordan Russell were elevated into the expanded leadership group for 2011, replacing Heath Scotland, who stepped down, and Simon Wiggins, who retired from the AFL at the end of 2010.

There was a substantial number of changes to Brett Ratten's senior coaching panel between 2010 and 2011. The contracts of forward-line assistant coach Matthew Lappin and defensive assistant coach Brett Montgomery were not renewed, with the pair taking assistant coaching roles at Collingwood and the Western Bulldogs respectively. Midfield assistant coach Robert Harvey, and development coach/VFL senior coach David Teague also left to pursue assistant coaching roles at St Kilda and West Coast respectively. The three vacant assistant coaching positions were filled by Alan Richardson from Essendon, John Barker from Hawthorn, and Gavin Brown from Collingwood. Darren Harris, who had been serving as development manager since 2009, stepped into Teague's role as development coach and VFL senior coach, and Luke Webster also joined the club as a development coach.

Carlton adopted a new 'clash guernsey' design for the 2011 season. The new design was predominantly sky blue, with navy blue CFC monogram, numbers, trimming and side-panels. The sky blue guernsey replaced a predominantly white clash guernsey which had been in use since 2007. The guernsey was worn with new sky blue shorts, and the traditional navy blue socks (with a white hoop added in the event of clashing socks). The clash guernsey was first worn in Round 7 against St Kilda.

== Squad and player statistics for 2011 ==
Flags represent the state of origin, i.e. the state in which the player played his Under-18s football.

Senior List
No.	State	Player	Age	AFL Debut	Recruited from	Career (to end 2010)		2011 Player Statistics
No.	State	Player	Age	AFL Debut	Recruited from	Gms	Gls	Gms	Gls	B	D	K	HB	M	T	HO
1	(Victoria (state))	Andrew Walker	24	2004	Bendigo (U18)	103	37	24	56	27	349	238	111	111	62	1
2	(South Australia)	Jordan Russell (lg)	24	2005	West Adelaide	93	15	16	3	2	267	164	103	73	55	–
3	(Victoria (state))	Marc Murphy (lg)	23	2006	Oakleigh (U18)	102	82	24	22	13	699	391	308	109	108	1
4	(South Australia)	Bryce Gibbs (lg)	21	2007	Glenelg	89	40	23	21	18	548	381	167	174	82	3
5	(Victoria (state))	Chris Judd (c)	27	2002	Sandringham (U18), West Coast	198	179	24	14	16	633	301	332	69	148	–
6	(Victoria (state))	Kade Simpson (vc)	26	2003	Eastern (U18)	133	79	24	17	18	536	361	175	147	79	5
8	(Victoria (state))	Matthew Kreuzer	21	2008	Northern (U18)	56	31	12	7	7	140	66	74	27	44	148
9	(Western Australia)	Kane Lucas	19	2010	East Fremantle	8	0	2	–	–	28	17	11	10	4	–
10	(Victoria (state))	Matthew Watson	18	2011	Calder (U18)	–	–	3	–	–	38	29	9	9	2	–
11	(Victoria (state))	Robert Warnock	23	2007	Sandringham (U18), Fremantle	33	8	20	4	8	229	86	143	42	51	591
12	(Tasmania)	Mitch Robinson	21	2009	Tasmania (U18/VFL)	26	19	23	10	21	517	304	213	121	97	15
13	(Western Australia)	Chris Yarran	20	2009	Swan Districts	22	23	23	8	8	409	296	113	77	76	–
14	(Victoria (state))	Brock McLean	24	2004	Calder (U18), Melbourne	100	41	4	1	2	62	23	39	13	23	–
15	(Victoria (state))	Jeremy Laidler	21	2009	Geelong (U18, AFL)	2	0	19	2	1	300	195	105	110	42	–
16	(Victoria (state))	Andrew Collins	22	2009	Bendigo (U18), Richmond	25	23	2	–	3	18	11	7	11	5	–
17	(Republic of Ireland)	Setanta Ó hAilpín	27	2005	Cork GAA	72	56	8	11	10	104	72	32	33	10	59
18	(Western Australia)	Paul Bower	22	2006	Peel	57	3	3	–	–	20	13	7	8	3	–
19	(Victoria (state))	Eddie Betts	24	2005	Calder (U18)	120	165	24	50	22	297	176	121	90	84	–
21	(South Australia)	Mark Austin	21	2007	Glenelg	14	1	1	–	–	8	4	4	2	4	–
22	(Queensland)	Shaun Hampson	22	2007	Mount Gravatt	35	11	9	3	5	74	29	45	21	17	185
23	(Victoria (state))	Lachlan Henderson	21	2007	Geelong (U18), Brisbane	34	28	15	3	2	173	103	70	70	34	1
24	(South Australia)	Pat McCarthy	18	–	Glenelg	–	–	–	–	–	–	–	–	–	–	–
25	(Victoria (state))	Luke Mitchell	18	–	Calder (U18)	–	–	–	–	–	–	–	–	–	–	–
26	(Victoria (state))	Andrew McInnes	18	–	Dandenong (U18)	–	–	–	–	–	–	–	–	–	–	–
27	(Western Australia)	Dennis Armfield	24	2008	Swan Districts	45	2	15	7	1	189	122	67	41	30	–
29	(Victoria (state))	Heath Scotland	30	1999	Western (U18), Collingwood	199	67	24	5	5	617	346	271	163	73	2
30	(Victoria (state))	Jarrad Waite	27	2003	Murray (U18)	131	153	12	16	19	174	116	58	83	24	–
31	(Tasmania)	Marcus Davies	19	2010	North Hobart	5	0	8	1	2	67	38	29	19	21	–
32	(Victoria (state))	Bret Thornton	27	2002	Oakleigh (U18)	161	8	20	13	8	317	215	102	146	27	1
33	(Victoria (state))	Ryan Houlihan	28	2000	Murray (U18)	195	127	6	–	3	69	30	39	10	13	–
34	(South Australia)	Nick Duigan	26	2011	Norwood	–	–	22	1	2	354	195	159	131	50	–
36	(Victoria (state))	Rohan Kerr	19	–	Dandenong (U18)	–	–	–	–	–	–	–	–	–	–	–
38	(Western Australia)	Jeff Garlett	21	2009	Swan Districts	30	51	24	48	32	294	216	78	84	96	–
40	(Victoria (state))	Michael Jamison (lg)	24	2007	North Ballarat (U18, VFL)	57	0	14	1	4	176	114	62	71	26	–
43	(Western Australia)	Simon White	22	2010	Subiaco	6	1	6	1	1	69	38	31	17	11	–
44	(Victoria (state))	Andrew Carrazzo (lg)	27	2004	Oakleigh (U18), Geelong	122	36	18	5	3	424	205	219	75	95	2
45	(Tasmania)	Aaron Joseph	21	2009	Tasmania (U18)	45	5	11	4	1	130	79	51	44	28	–
46	(Western Australia)	David Ellard	21	2008	Swan Districts	8	3	19	15	7	278	162	116	59	115	–
Rookie List
No.	State	Player	Age	AFL Debut	Recruited from	Career (to end 2010)		2011 Player Statistics
No.	State	Player	Age	AFL Debut	Recruited from	Gms	Gls	Gms	Gls	B	D	K	HB	M	T	HO
20	(South Australia)	Rhys O'Keeffe	20	2011	North Adelaide	–	–	1	–	–	8	3	5	1	1	–
28	(Victoria (state))	Jaryd Cachia	19	–	Northern (U18)	–	–	–	–	–	–	–	–	–	–	–
35	(Victoria (state))	Ed Curnow	21	2011	Geelong (U18), Adelaide, Box Hill	–	–	12	3	1	215	117	98	47	55	–
37	(Victoria (state))	Joseph Dare	19	–	Geelong (U18)	–	–	–	–	–	–	–	–	–	–	–
39	(Victoria (state))	Wayde Twomey	24	2011	Western (U18), Werribee, Swan Districts	–	–	2	1	–	13	10	3	7	8	–
41	(Victoria (state))	Levi Casboult	20	–	Dandenong (U18)	–	–	–	–	–	–	–	–	–	–	–
42	(Republic of Ireland)	Zach Tuohy	21	2011	Laois GAA	–	–	11	3	1	138	74	64	31	9	–
47	(Western Australia)	Mitchell Carter	19	–	South Fremantle	–	–	–	–	–	–	–	–	–	–	–
48	(New South Wales)	Blake Bray	18	–	Western Suburbs	–	–	–	–	–	–	–	–	–	–	–
Senior coaching panel
	Born	Coach	Coaching position				Carlton Coaching debut		Former clubs as coach
	(Victoria (state))	Brett Ratten	Senior Coach				2007		Melbourne (a), Norwood (EFL) (s)
	(Victoria (state))	Alan Richardson	Senior Assistant Coach				2011		East Burwood (s), Coburg (s), Western Bulldogs (a), Collingwood (a), Essendon (a)
	(Victoria (state))	John Barker	Assistant coach				2011		St Kilda (a), Hawthorn (a)
	(Victoria (state))	Gavin Brown	Assistant coach				2011		Collingwood (a), Collingwood (VFL) (s)
	(Victoria (state))	Matthew Capuano	Assistant coach				2009
	(Western Australia)	Mark Riley	Assistant coach				2008		Claremont (s), Fremantle (d, a), Melbourne (a, cs)
	(Victoria (state))	Darren Harris	Development & Academy Manager, and VFL Senior Coach				2009		Wodonga Raiders (O&MFL) (s), NSW/ACT Rams (d), West Perth (s), West Coast (a)
	(Victoria (state))	Luke Webster	Development coach				2011
For players: (c) denotes captain, (vc) denotes vice-captain, (lg) denotes leadership group. For coaches: (s) denotes senior coach, (cs) denotes caretaker senior coach, (a) denotes assistant coach, (d) denotes development coach. Players' ages are given for 1 January 2011. Statistics for AFL matches: Gms – Games played, Gls – Goals, B – Behinds, D – Disposals, K – Kicks, HB – Handballs, M – Marks, T – Tackles, HO – Hitouts. Source for statistics: AFL Tables.

== Playing list changes ==
The following summarises all player changes between the conclusion of the 2010 season and the conclusion of the 2011 season.

=== In ===
Player	Previous club	League	via
(Victoria (state)) Andrew Collins	Richmond	AFL	AFL Trade Week, in exchange for Shaun Grigg
(Victoria (state)) Jeremy Laidler	Geelong	AFL	AFL Trade Week, with pick No. 41, in exchange for picks No. 36 and 53^{Note 3}
(Victoria (state)) Matthew Watson	Calder	TAC Cup	AFL National Draft, first round (pick No. 18)
(South Australia) Patrick McCarthy	Glenelg	SANFL	AFL National Draft, second round (pick No. 34)
(Victoria (state)) Luke Mitchell	Calder	TAC Cup	AFL National Draft, second round (pick No. 42)
(Victoria (state)) Andrew McInnes	Dandenong	TAC Cup	AFL National Draft, fourth round (pick No. 67)
(South Australia) Nick Duigan	Norwood	SANFL	AFL National Draft, fourth round (pick No. 70)
(Victoria (state)) Ed Curnow	Box Hill	VFL	AFL Rookie Draft, first round (pick No. 18)
(Victoria (state)) Wayde Twomey	Swan Districts	WAFL	AFL Rookie Draft, third round (pick No. 51)
(Western Australia) Mitchell Carter	South Fremantle	WAFL	AFL Rookie Draft, fourth round (pick No. 66)
(New South Wales) Blake Bray	Western Suburbs	Sydney AFL	Elevated from NSW/ACT Scholarship during AFL Rookie Draft, fifth round (pick No. 78)

=== Out ===
Player	New Club	League	via
(Tasmania) Simon Wiggins	Sunshine	WRFL	Retired from AFL
(Victoria (state)) Shaun Grigg	Richmond	AFL	AFL Trade Week, in exchange for Andrew Collins
(South Australia) Sam Jacobs	Adelaide	AFL	AFL Trade Week, in exchange for picks No. 33 and 67^{Note 3}
(Western Australia) Richard Hadley	East Fremantle	WAFL	Retired from AFL
(Victoria (state)) Brad Fisher	West Adelaide	SANFL	Delisted
(Western Australia) Chris Johnson	Greenvale	EDFL	Delisted
(Northern Territory) Joe Anderson	Sturt	SANFL	Delisted
(Western Australia) Steven Browne	West Perth	WAFL	Delisted
(Victoria (state)) Caleb Tiller	Cranbourne	MPNFL	Delisted
(Victoria (state)) Josh Donaldson	West Perth	WAFL	Delisted from rookie list

=== List management ===
Player	Change
(Western Australia) Jeff Garlett	Promoted from the rookie list to the senior list during AFL National Draft, fifth round (pick No. 85)
(Western Australia) David Ellard	Promoted from the rookie list to the senior list during AFL National Draft, sixth round (pick No. 99)
(Western Australia) Simon White	Promoted from the rookie list to the senior list during AFL National Draft, seventh round (pick No. 108)
(Western Australia) Kane Lucas	Changed guernsey number from No. 24 to No. 9
(Victoria (state)) Brock McLean	Changed guernsey number from No. 7 to No. 14
(South Australia) Rhys O'Keeffe	Delisted, then re-drafted as a rookie during AFL Rookie Draft, second round (pick No. 35)
(Victoria (state)) Ed Curnow	Prior to Round 1, Curnow was made a nominated rookie for 2011.
(Victoria (state)) Luke Mitchell (Victoria (state)) Levi Casboult	Prior to Round 1, Mitchell was moved to the long term injury list (shoulder), and Casboult was elevated from the rookie list in his place.
(Victoria (state)) Levi Casboult (Republic of Ireland) Zach Tuohy	Prior to Round 6, Casboult was moved to the long term injury list (knee), and Tuohy was elevated from the rookie list in his place.
(Republic of Ireland) Zach Tuohy (Victoria (state)) Luke Mitchell	Prior to Round 9, Mitchell returned to the senior list from the long-term injury list, and Tuohy returned to the rookie list.
(Victoria (state)) Luke Mitchell (Republic of Ireland) Zach Tuohy	Prior to Round 11, Mitchell was again moved to the long term injury list (shoulder), and Tuohy was again elevated from the rookie list in his place.
(Victoria (state)) Levi Casboult	Prior to Round 13, Casboult returned to the rookie list from the long-term injury list.
(Victoria (state)) Andrew Collins (South Australia) Rhys O'Keeffe	Prior to Round 14, Collins was moved to the long term injury list (shoulder), and O'Keeffe was elevated from the rookie list in his place.
(Victoria (state)) Andrew McInnes (Victoria (state)) Wayde Twomey	Prior to Round 17, McInnes was moved to the long term injury list (shoulder), and Twomey was elevated from the rookie list in his place.
(Victoria (state)) Ryan Houlihan	Prior to the Elimination Final, Houlihan announced his retirement, effective immediately for Carlton matches, and effective at the end of the season for Northern Bullants matches.

== Season summary ==
=== Pre-season matches ===
==== NAB Cup ====
**Round**	**Date and local time**	**Opponent**	**Scores** (Carlton's scores indicated in **bold**)			**Venue**	**Attendance**
**Round**	**Date and local time**	**Opponent**	Home	Away	Result	**Venue**	**Attendance**
**Pool matches**
1	Saturday, 12 February (7:15 pm)	Richmond	**0.6.5 (41)**	0.3.5 (23)	Won by 18 points Report	Etihad Stadium **[H]**	40,300
1	Saturday, 12 February (9:35 pm)	Collingwood	**0.3.8 (26)**	0.5.3 (33)	Lost by 7 points Report	Etihad Stadium **[H]**	40,300
Finished second out of three in the group; eliminated from NAB Cup

==== NAB Challenge ====
**Week**	**Date and local time**	**Opponent**	**Scores** (Carlton's scores indicated in **bold**)			**Venue**	**Attendance**
**Week**	**Date and local time**	**Opponent**	Home	Away	Result	**Venue**	**Attendance**
1	Saturday, 26 February (4:00 pm)	GWS	4.2 (26)	**29.9 (183)**	Won by 157 points Report	Manuka Oval **[A]**	5,991
2	Friday, 4 March (4:00 pm)	Adelaide	**15.10 (100)**	11.10 (76)	Won by 24 points Report	Visy Park **[H]**	3,000 (approx.)
3	Saturday, 12 March (1:00 pm)	Geelong	**11.15 (81)**	14.8 (92)	Lost by 11 points Report	Visy Park **[H]**	8,000 (approx.)

=== Regular season ===
2011 was Carlton's best regular season performance for more than a decade. The team finished in fifth place with a record of 14–7–1, two wins above St Kilda in sixth, and two-and-a-half wins below West Coast in fourth. Carlton spent the entire season between second and fifth on the ladder. Performances were consistent throughout the year based on finishing position, including:

- A record of 0–5 in five games against the top four teams; the performances in those games were competitive, with an average losing margin of 19 points, and the largest loss by only 36 points;
- A record of 4–1–1 in six games against teams which finished between sixth and eighth;
- A record of 10–1 in eleven games against teams which failed to reach the finals, with the Round 16 match against the Western Bulldogs accounting for the only big upset loss of Carlton's season.

Through the latter half of the season, Carlton was mostly in a fight with Hawthorn and West Coast to claim third and fourth positions. Although Carlton held fourth place for much of the latter half of the year, West Coast was always in a strong position to overtake Carlton in the final rounds due to having a game in hand and more games against non-finalists. West Coast ultimately moved into the top four in Round 22, after Carlton's loss against Hawthorn.

**Round**	**Date and local time**	**Opponent**	**Scores** (Carlton's scores indicated in **bold**)			**Venue**	**Attendance**	**Ladder** **position**
**Round**	**Date and local time**	**Opponent**	Home	Away	Result	**Venue**	**Attendance**	**Ladder** **position**
1	Thursday, 24 March (7:40 pm)	Richmond	**14.20 (104)**	13.6 (84)	Won by 20 points Report	M.C.G. **[H]**	60,654	3rd
2	Saturday, 2 April (6:50 pm)	Gold Coast	7.10 (52)	**26.15 (171)**	Won by 119 points Report	The Gabba **[A]**	27,914	2nd
3	Friday, 8 April (7:40 pm)	Collingwood	15.12 (102)	**11.8 (74)**	Lost by 28 points Report	M.C.G. **[A]**	88,181	4th
4	Saturday, 16 April (2:10 pm)	Essendon	**11.13 (79)**	11.13 (79)	Match drawn Report	M.C.G. **[H]**	78,065	5th
5	Saturday, 23 April (2:10 pm)	Adelaide	**11.19 (85)**	12.7 (79)	Won by 6 points Report	Etihad Stadium **[H]**	37,607	4th
6	Friday, 29 April (7:40 pm)	Sydney	10.11 (71)	**12.15 (87)**	Won by 16 points Report	S.C.G. **[A]**	28,081	3rd
7	Monday, 9 May (7:20 pm)	St Kilda	12.9 (81)	**11.18 (84)**	Won by 3 points Report	Etihad Stadium **[A]**	41,576	3rd
8	Bye							4th
9	Friday, 20 May (7:40 pm)	Geelong	**14.16 (100)**	15.12 (102)	Lost by 2 points Report	Etihad Stadium **[H]**	48,429	5th
10	Friday, 27 May (7:40 pm)	Melbourne	6.10 (46)	**13.15 (93)**	Won by 47 points Report	M.C.G. **[A]**	47,464	4th
11	Sunday, 5 June (4:10 pm)	Port Adelaide	7.7 (49)	**16.15 (111)**	Won by 62 points Report	AAMI Stadium **[A]**	23,192	4th
12	Sunday, 12 June (1:10 pm)	Brisbane Lions	**19.10 (124)**	9.9 (63)	Won by 61 points Report	Etihad Stadium **[H]**	43,617	3rd
13	Sunday, 19 June (2:10 pm)	Sydney	**15.10 (100)**	10.6 (66)	Won by 34 points Report	Etihad Stadium **[H]**	42,788	3rd
14	Sunday, 26 June (2:10 pm)	West Coast	**10.7 (67)**	15.13 (103)	Lost by 36 points Report	Etihad Stadium **[H]**	38,241	4th
15	Saturday, 2 July (2:10 pm)	Richmond	12.9 (81)	**28.16 (184)**	Won by 103 points Report	M.C.G. **[A]**	59,650	3rd
16	Sunday, 10 July (4:40 pm)	Western Bulldogs	14.12 (96)	**9.15 (69)**	Lost by 27 points Report	Etihad Stadium **[A]**	38,582	4th
17	Saturday, 16 July (2:10 pm)	Collingwood	**11.13 (79)**	13.20 (98)	Lost by 19 points Report	M.C.G. **[H]**	85,936	4th
18	Saturday, 23 July (7:10 pm)	Essendon	12.7 (79)	**24.9 (153)**	Won by 74 points Report	M.C.G. **[A]**	74,123	4th
19	Friday, 29 July (7:40 pm)	North Melbourne	9.8 (62)	**11.14 (80)**	Won by 18 points Report	Etihad Stadium **[A]**	41,332	4th
20	Saturday, 6 August (2:10 pm)	Melbourne	**21.8 (134)**	7.16 (58)	Won by 76 points Report	M.C.G. **[H]**	42,342	4th
21	Saturday, 13 August (1:10 pm)	Fremantle	12.13 (85)	**16.19 (115)**	Won by 30 points Report	Patersons Stadium **[A]**	34,737	4th
22	Friday, 19 August (7:40 pm)	Hawthorn	**8.18 (66)**	10.18 (78)	Lost by 12 points Report	Etihad Stadium **[H]**	52,052	5th
23	Bye							5th
24	Saturday, 3 September (7:10 pm)	St Kilda	13.8 (86)	**9.12 (66)**	Lost by 20 points Report	MCG **[H]**	55,606	5th

=== Finals ===
In the elimination final against Essendon, Carlton fell fourteen points behind during the first quarter, after kicking five early behinds to Essendon's three goals; the Blues then kicked the next ten goals of the game before half time to set up an unbeatable lead, and finished with a comfortable 62-point win.

In the semi-final against West Coast, Carlton kicked the first four goals of the match, before conceding eight goals to three in the second quarter to trail by 11 points at half-time. The second half was closely fought, with West Coast maintaining a one- to three-goal lead for most of the half. After the Eagles opened the lead to 21 points during time-on in the final quarter, Carlton kicked the last three goals of the game to narrow the margin to less than a goal; but, time expired, and West Coast won by three points.

**Week**	**Date and local time**	**Opponent**	**Scores** (Carlton's scores indicated in **bold**)			**Venue**	**Attendance**
**Week**	**Date and local time**	**Opponent**	Home	Away	Result	**Venue**	**Attendance**
First Elimination Final	Sunday, 11 September (2:40 pm)	Essendon	**21.23 (149)**	13.9 (87)	Won by 62 points Report	MCG **[H]**	90,161
First Semi-final	Saturday, 17 September (5:50 pm)	West Coast	15.11 (101)	**15.8 (98)**	Lost by 3 points Report	Patersons Stadium **[A]**	42,803

- H Home match.
- A Away match.

== Ladder ==
2011 AFL ladder
Pos	Team	Pld	W	L	D	PF	PA	PP	Pts	
1	Collingwood	22	20	2	0	2592	1546	167.7	80	Finals series
2	Geelong (P)	22	19	3	0	2548	1619	157.4	76	Finals series
3	Hawthorn	22	18	4	0	2355	1634	144.1	72	Finals series
4	West Coast	22	17	5	0	2235	1715	130.3	68	Finals series
5	Carlton	22	14	7	1	2225	1700	130.9	58	Finals series
6	St Kilda	22	12	9	1	1891	1677	112.8	50	Finals series
7	Sydney	22	12	9	1	1897	1735	109.3	50	Finals series
8	Essendon	22	11	10	1	2217	2217	100.0	46	Finals series
9	North Melbourne	22	10	12	0	2106	2082	101.2	40	
10	Western Bulldogs	22	9	13	0	2060	2155	95.6	36	
11	Fremantle	22	9	13	0	1791	2155	83.1	36	
12	Richmond	22	8	13	1	2069	2396	86.4	34	
13	Melbourne	22	8	13	1	1974	2315	85.3	34	
14	Adelaide	22	7	15	0	1742	2193	79.4	28	
15	Brisbane Lions	22	4	18	0	1814	2240	81.0	16	
16	Port Adelaide	22	3	19	0	1718	2663	64.5	12	
17	Gold Coast	22	3	19	0	1534	2726	56.3	12	

Source: AFL ladder
Rules for classification: 1) points; 2) percentage; 3) number of points for.
(P) Premiers

== Leading Goalkickers ==
Andrew Walker was Carlton's leading goalkicker for 2011. It was the first time Walker had won the club goalkicking. He had kicked only 37 goals in his first seven seasons, but after struggling to hold his place in the team in 2010 as a midfielder, he became a permanent forward in 2011, where he kicked 56 goals in 24 games.

In addition to Walker's 56 goals, Eddie Betts kicked 50 goals and Jeff Garlett kicked 48 goals; all three players finished inside the top twenty for the Coleman Medal. Carlton was the only club to have three players kick more than 40 goals in the home and away season.

Player	Goals	Behinds	Coleman
Andrew Walker	56	27	7th
Eddie Betts	50	22	10th
Jeff Garlett	48	32	13th
Marc Murphy	22	13	
Bryce Gibbs	21	18	
Kade Simpson	17	18	
Jarrad Waite	16	19	
David Ellard	15	7	
Chris Judd	14	16	
Bret Thornton	13	8	
^{*}The table reflects goals kicked in both home-and-away season and finals. However, the player's position in the Coleman Medal standings is based upon home-and-away season goals only.

== Team awards and records ==
Game records

- Round 2 – Carlton's score of 26.15 (171) against Gold Coast was its highest in any game since Round 18, 2000, and its highest ever outside the city of Melbourne.
- Round 2 – Carlton's winning margin of 119 points against Gold Coast was its highest in any game since Round 10, 2001; and, its highest ever outside the city of Melbourne.
- Round 2 – Carlton's first quarter score of 9.5 (59) against Gold Coast was its highest first quarter score in any game since Round 2, 1984.
- Round 3 – the attendance of 88,181 at the Carlton vs Collingwood match was the highest ever for a home-and-away match between the two teams, and was the second-highest for a Carlton home-and-away match against any opponent.
- Round 6 – Carlton's win against Sydney at the S.C.G. was its first win in Sydney since Round 7, 1993, breaking a losing streak of ten matches (seven matches at the S.C.G. and three matches at ANZ Stadium).
- Round 10 – Melbourne's score of 6.10 (46) was the lowest score conceded by Carlton in any game since Round 5, 2004.
- Round 11 - Carlton held Port Adelaide scoreless in the final quarter, the first time since Round 19, 1999 that Carlton had kept a team scoreless for a quarter of football.
- Round 15 – Carlton's score of 28.16 (184) against Richmond was its highest in any game since Round 17, 1998, and its highest ever in any game against Richmond, breaking the previous record of 28.9 (177) set in the 1972 VFL Grand Final.
- Round 15 – Carlton's score in the second half, 17.9 (111), was its highest in a half of any game since Round 18, 2000.
- First Elimination Final – Carlton's win against Essendon was its first win in a finals match since the First Elimination Final, 2001, on 8 September 2001, a drought of ten years, three days. The club featured in three losing finals during the drought.
- First Elimination Final – the attendance of 90,161 was a new record for the highest in VFL/AFL history for an Elimination Final; this record was surpassed in 2013.

Season records

- Carlton's home and away record of 14–7–1 was its best since 2000.
- Carlton's home and away season placing of 5th was its best since 2001.
- Carlton's final placing of 5th was its best since 2000.
- Carlton conceded only 1700 points in the home and away season, its fewest since 1976.
- Carlton's percentage of 130.88 was its best since 2000.

Other

- Round 2 – Carlton was the first ever opponent of the newly admitted Gold Coast Football Club in an AFL premiership match. (Gold Coast was scheduled with a bye in Round 1).
- Round 18 – Carlton won the 2011 Madden Cup with its 74-point win over Essendon.
- First Elimination Final – Carlton's played its first finals match in Melbourne since the First Semi-final, 2001, on 15 September 2001, a drought of nine years, 361 days. The club featured in two interstate finals during the drought.

== Individual awards and records ==
=== John Nicholls Medal ===
The Carlton Football Club Best and Fairest awards night took place on 4 October. The John Nicholls Medal, for the best and fairest player of the club, as well as several other awards, were presented on the night..

John Nicholls Medal

The voting system for the John Nicholls Medal remained the same as in 2010. In each match, the five members of the Match Committee awarded votes. Each committee member could award votes to up to eight players, and each player could receive up to ten votes from each judge. A "perfect score" for a round is 50 votes. The player with the most total votes across all premiership season matches (including home and away matches and finals) wins the award.

The winner of the John Nicholls Medal was Marc Murphy, who polled 678 votes. It was the first John Nicholls Medal of Murphy's career. Murphy won comfortably ahead of Chris Judd (469 votes) and Bryce Gibbs (448 votes). The top ten is given below.

Pos.	Player	Votes
1st	Marc Murphy	678
2nd	Chris Judd	469
3rd	Bryce Gibbs	448
4th	Heath Scotland	408
5th	Kade Simpson	376
6th	Andrew Walker	319
7th	Mitch Robinson	301
8th	Eddie Betts	285
9th	Michael Jamison	257
10th	Chris Yarran	237

Other awards

The following other awards were presented on John Nicholls Medal night:-

- Best First-Year Player – Nick Duigan
- Best Clubman – Heath Scotland
- Best Player in Finals – Marc Murphy
- Women of Carlton Ambassador Award – Chris Yarran
- Spirit of Carlton Encouragement Award – Kade Simpson and Mitch Robinson
- Carltonians Achievement Award – Heath Scotland
- Blues Coterie "Fierce Award" – Mitch Robinson

=== Brownlow Medal ===
The lead-up to the 2011 Brownlow Medal focussed heavily on Carlton. Chris Judd entered the night as a strong favourite to win; a series of eye-catching performances meant he became the outright favourite early in the season; after Round 20, major betting agency Sportsbet was offering odds shorter than $2 for Judd to win, and decided to pay out early to all punters who had already backed Judd for the win. Murphy also figured prominently in Brownlow markets during the season, fuelled by his career-best season, and very strong polling in other MVP awards, most notably the AFL Coaches Association Player of the Year Award. Bookmakers were offering odds as short as $5.50 in Round 18, when Murphy was second-favourite behind Judd. By the end of the season, Murphy was fifth-favourite behind Judd, Sydney's Adam Goodes and Collingwood's Scott Pendlebury and Dane Swan.

In the end, neither player won the medal. Judd polled 23 votes to finish equal 5th, and Murphy polled 19 votes to finish equal 7th, out of eligible players. Bryce Gibbs was the only other Carlton player with double figures, polling 12 votes.

=== AFLPA Awards ===
For each of the AFLPA awards, one or three Carlton players were nominated following internal vote of Carlton players (except for Best Captain, where captain Chris Judd was nominated by default). A vote of all players in the league, selecting from a ballot of all club nominees, was then used to determine the final placings.

Chris Judd won the Leigh Matthews Trophy for the second time in his career, the first being in 2006 when he was playing for the West Coast Eagles. He became the fifth player to win the award more than once. He polled 1,347 votes, almost three times as many as second-place finisher Scott Pendlebury (Collingwood). He also won the Best Captain Award for the first time in his career.

Leigh Matthews Trophy (Most Valuable Player)

- Chris Judd (winner)
- Marc Murphy (nominated)
- Kade Simpson (nominated)

Robert Rose Award (Most Courageous Player)

- Kade Simpson (nominated)

Best First Year Player

- Nick Duigan (nominated)

Best Captain

- Chris Judd (winner)

=== Other awards ===
All-Australian Team

The 40-man squad for the All-Australian Team was announced on 6 September 2011, and the final team of 22 was announced on 19 September 2011, with Judd and Murphy both nominated in the team. It was the sixth All-Australian guernsey for Judd, who was made vice-captain for the second time (having also served once as captain), and it was Murphy's first time as an All-Australian.

- Chris Judd (ruck rover, vice captain)
- Marc Murphy (half forward flank)
- Eddie Betts (nominated in 40-man squad)
- Heath Scotland (nominated in 40-man squad)

Most Valuable Player awards

Judd and Murphy both featured prominently in most valuable player awards, voted on by various broadcasters, commentators and professional associations of the AFL (only appearances in the top five of each award are shown):

- AFL Coaches Association Champion Player of the Year – Marc Murphy (winner), Chris Judd (2nd)
- The Age Footballer of the Year – Marc Murphy (winner), Chris Judd (3rd)
- Herald Sun Player of the Year – Chris Judd (2nd), Marc Murphy (5th)
- Lou Richards Medal (Nine's Wide World of Sports player of the year) – Marc Murphy (2nd), Chris Judd (3rd)
- ABC Footballer of the Year – Chris Judd (4th)
- SEN 1116 Marbletrend Player of the Year – Chris Judd (2nd)
- Triple M Bonaire Best on Ground – Chris Judd (2nd)
- 3AW Player of the Year – Chris Judd (2nd)

Representative honours

- Andrew Walker, Eddie Betts and Chris Yarran were all selected in the Indigenous All-Stars squad for the All-Stars' pre-season match against Richmond; however, the match was ultimately cancelled due to inclement weather.
- Mitch Robinson was selected in the Australian team and Zach Tuohy was selected in the Irish team for the 2011 International rules series.

Mark of the Year

Andrew Walker's Round 18 mark was one of the three finalists in the Mark of the Year. It had been the favourite to win, with many football observers, including The Age's Rohan Connolly, and both match-day coaches, Brett Ratten and James Hird, stating that it was one of the greatest marks of all-time; however, it was beaten for the season's Mark of the Year award by Andrew Krakouer's Round 9 mark.

Overall, five Carlton marks were nominated throughout the season, and all five won their individual Mark of the Week votes.

- Mark of the Year – Andrew Walker, Round 18 (nominated)
- Mark of the Week:
  - Round 5 – Andrew Walker (winner)
  - Round 12 – Shaun Hampson (winner)
  - Round 18 – Andrew Walker (winner)
  - Round 19 – Nick Duigan (winner)
  - Round 21 – Andrew Walker (winner)

Goal of the Year

Eddie Betts' Round 18 goal was nominated amongst the three finalists for Goal of the Year. Overall, three Carlton goals were nominated throughout the season, and all three won their individual Goal of the Week votes.

- Goal of the Year – Eddie Betts, Round 18 (nominated)
- Goal of the Week:
  - Round 9 – Chris Judd (winner)
  - Round 12 – Eddie Betts (winner)
  - Round 18 – Eddie Betts (winner)

Rising Star

No Carlton players were nominated for the NAB AFL Rising Star Award during 2011.

Other

The Deadly Award for Outstanding Achievement in AFL was won by Andrew Walker. The Deadly Awards are awarded annually across a variety of fields, not only sport, to Aboriginal Australians and Torres Strait Islanders.

Former premiership player and coach Robert Walls was elevated to Legend status in the Carlton Football Club Hall of Fame.

Andrew Walker, Heath Scotland and Andrew Carrazzo were all awarded life membership of the club at the AGM in December, as recognition for eight years of senior service.

=== Player records ===
- Elimination Final – Kade Simpson played his 143rd consecutive game. At the time, this was recognised as a new Carlton Football Club record, breaking the record of Jim Francis, who played 142 consecutive games between 1935-1942. However, in December 2012, the AFL amended the interpretation of this record such that interstate matches played on the same weekend as a club match were counted as part of a streak of consecutive games; as a result, Bruce Doull assumed the club record with 162 consecutive games between 1971–1978.

=== Milestones ===
Player	Milestone	Round
Ed Curnow	AFL debut	Round 1
Nick Duigan	AFL debut	Round 1
Heath Scotland	200 AFL Games	Round 1
Matthew Watson	AFL debut	Round 2
Chris Judd	200 AFL Games	Round 2
Heath Scotland	150 Carlton Games	Round 3
Jordan Russell	100 AFL Games	Round 7
Dennis Armfield	50 AFL Games	Round 9
Zach Tuohy	AFL debut	Round 11
Bryce Gibbs	100 AFL games	Round 12
Rhys O'Keeffe	AFL debut	Round 14
Aaron Joseph	50 AFL games	Round 17
Wayde Twomey	AFL debut	Round 17
Kade Simpson	150 AFL games	Round 18
Ryan Houlihan	200 AFL games	Round 19
Jeff Garlett	50 AFL games	Round 21
Robert Warnock	50 AFL Games	Round 22

== Northern Bullants ==
The Carlton Football Club had a full affiliation with the Northern Bullants during the 2011 season. It was the ninth season of the clubs' affiliation, which had been in place since 2003. Carlton senior- and rookie-listed players who were not selected to play in the Carlton team were eligible to play for either the Northern Bullants seniors or reserves team, including both Victorian Football League matches and Foxtel Cup matches. As in 2010, home games were shared between the Bullants' traditional home ground, Preston City Oval, and Carlton's traditional home ground, Visy Park.

The Bullants finished 4th out of 13 in the VFL, after being defeated in the preliminary final by Port Melbourne. The Bullants had finished sixth on the ladder after the home-and-away season with a record of 10–8. Additionally, in the inaugural season of the Foxtel Cup, the Bullants reached the second round (quarter finals) before being eliminated by eventual runners-up Claremont. Carlton's Brock McLean, who played nineteen matches for the Bullants through the year, won the Laurie Hill Trophy as the Bullants' best and fairest.

== Notes ==
:1. Although Hawthorn had a higher overall membership, that Victorian-based club additionally plays several home games in Tasmania each year.
:2. Ratten also served as head coach in the final six rounds of 2007 as caretaker, before being officially appointed as head coach for 2008.
:3. Many draft picks involved in trades changed their position slightly on draft day (e.g Carlton acquired pick No. 33 in the trade for Sam Jacobs, then used pick No. 34 to draft Pat McCarthy), because the use of compensatory draft picks in the early rounds of the draft or passing in later rounds of the draft led to the draft picks being re-numbered.
