= 2010 AFL draft =

Draft for the Australian Football League

General information
- Dates: 18 November 2010; 7 December 2010
- Network: Fox Sports
- Sponsored by: National Australia Bank

Overview
- League: AFL
- Expansion teams: Gold Coast
- Expansion season: 2011
- First selection: David Swallow (Gold Coast)

The 2010 AFL draft consisted of four opportunities for player acquisitions during the 2010/11 Australian Football League off-season. These were the trade week; held between (5 October and 12 October), the national draft; held on the (18 November), the pre-season draft (7 December) and the rookie draft (also held on 7 December).

== Gold Coast Suns concessions ==
The Gold Coast Football Club was to join the AFL in 2011, and was provided with several draft concessions, including additional draft selections, early access to recruit 17-year-old players, and access to uncontracted and previously listed players in this offseason. These concessions were similar to those provided to the Greater Western Sydney Giants in the following season.

Gold Coast was permitted to recruit the following players directly, without the need for any draft:

- At the end of 2009, up to twelve 17-year-old players (born 1 January – 30 April 1992), who were too young to enter the 2009 AFL draft. These players were not eligible to play senior AFL football in 2010, and would continue to undergo junior development, either in Sydney or their home state.
- At the end of 2010, up to ten players who were not on an AFL list but had previously nominated for a national draft. Gold Coast could immediately trade any players recruited in this manner.
- At the end of 2010, up to sixteen players who were on an AFL list, but were out of contract at the end of the season. No more than one player recruited from any other club. Clubs who lost players in this manner received compensatory selections in the national draft; the number and value of these selections was determined based on age, contract size, on-field performance and draft order, and may be used in any year between 2011 and 2015.
- At the end of each season between 2010 and 2012 seasons, up to five players recruited from the Queensland zone, and prior to the 2010 draft, up to three players from the Northern Territory zone.

Then, in the drafts, Gold Coast had the following selections:

- In the 2010 national draft, the first selection in each round, and picks No. 2, 3, 5, 7, 9, 11, 13 and 15 in the first round.
- In the 2009 rookie draft, the first five selections.

Gold Coast began with an expanded list size of up to forty-eight senior players and nine rookies, to be gradually reduced to a standard list size of thirty-eight senior players and nine rookies by 2015.

Throughout the 2010 AFL season, much interest surrounded which out-of-contract players would sign with the new Gold Coast Football Club. Nathan Bock was the first to be announced, followed by Nathan Krakouer and Michael Rischitelli. Campbell Brown and Jarrod Harbrow were the next two to be announced, ending many months of speculation about their move.

On 29 September, after a year of constant speculation and rumour, Geelong star Gary Ablett, Jr. announced that he had signed a five-year deal with the Suns, which will make him the highest paid player in the league.

Then on 7 October, the Gold Coast also signed Collingwood's Josh Fraser and Brisbane's Jared Brennan. Brennan is the second player from the Brisbane Lions to be signed by the Gold Coast. As the Gold Coast were only able to sign one non-contracted player from each club, the Lions had to agree with the deal and work out a fair compensation.

== Player movements ==
=== Trades ===
In the lead-up to trade week, Carlton's Sam Jacobs requested to be traded back to a South Australian club and Fremantle's Chris Tarrant returned to Melbourne. Shaun Grigg and Andrew Walker both requested to be traded from Carlton and Brisbane's Justin Sherman also wanted to leave Brisbane. Daniel Motlop, David Hale, Nathan Djerrkura and Will Thursfield were also mentioned as likely trade targets.

The timing of trade week was adjusted in 2010 to account for the un-contracted player announcements to be made by Gold Coast by Thursday 7 October. Whereas previous trade weeks had run from Monday to Friday, the 2010 trade week was originally scheduled to run from Monday 4 October to Monday 11 October. However, due to the 2010 Grand Final Replay, the start of trade week was delayed until Tuesday 5 October.

Trade	Player	Original club	New club	Traded for
1	Patrick Veszpremi and draft pick #91	Sydney	Western Bulldogs	Andrejs Everitt
2	Richard Tambling	Richmond	Adelaide	End of first round compensation pick & draft pick #51
3	Peter Faulks and pick #61	Gold Coast	Fremantle	pick #55
4	Andrew Krakouer, John Ceglar, picks #55, #78 and #95	Gold Coast	Collingwood	pick #25
5	Nathan Djerrkura	Geelong	Western Bulldogs	pick #57
6	David Hale and draft pick #52	North Melbourne	Hawthorn	End of first round compensation pick & draft pick #71
7	Rohan Bewick and Draft picks #5, #25 and #27	Gold Coast	Brisbane Lions	End of first round compensation pick & Draft picks #10 and #48
8	Ben McKinley	West Coast	North Melbourne	draft pick # 86
9	Andrew Collins	Richmond	Carlton	Shaun Grigg
10	Tendai Mzungu and draft pick #44	Gold Coast	Fremantle	draft pick #38
11	Sam Jacobs	Carlton	Adelaide	draft picks #34 and #67
12	Justin Sherman	Brisbane Lions	Western Bulldogs	End of first round compensation pick
13	Jonathon Griffin	Adelaide	Fremantle	draft pick #61
14	Jeremy Laidler and draft pick #41	Geelong	Carlton	Draft picks #36 and #53
15	Kyle Cheney and pick #66	Melbourne	Hawthorn	draft pick #52
16	Chris Tarrant and pick #44	Fremantle	Collingwood	draft pick #43 and #55
17	Cameron Richardson	Gold Coast	North Melbourne	draft pick #35
18	draft pick #45	West Coast	Collingwood	Third round compensation pick
19	Simon Philips and draft pick #35	Gold Coast	Port Adelaide	Second round compensation pick
20	draft pick #15	Gold Coast	Geelong	Middle of first round compensation pick

Source:AFL trade tracker Note: the numbering of the draft picks in this trades table is based on the original order prior to draft day. The final numbering of many of these draft picks was adjusted on draft day due to either the insertion of compensation draft picks in the early rounds, or clubs passing in the later rounds.

=== Retirements and delistings ===
Name	Club	Date	Notes
Trent Croad	Hawthorn	6 January 2010	Retirement, failed to recover from a broken foot suffered in the 2008 Grand Final.
Andrew Lovett	St Kilda	16 February 2010	Delisted.
Dean Solomon	Fremantle	18 February 2010	Retirement, ongoing knee problems.
Brett Kirk	Sydney	19 May 2010	Retirement, effective at the end of the 2010 season.
Simon Goodwin	Adelaide	25 May 2010	Retirement, effective at the end of the 2010 season.
Tyson Edwards	Adelaide	27 May 2010	Retirement, effective after Round 11 match against Fremantle.
Troy Simmonds	Richmond	27 May 2010	Retirement, effective after Round 11 match against St Kilda.
Brett Burton	Adelaide	21 June 2010	Retirement, effective at the end of the 2010 season.
Scott Thornton	Fremantle	28 June 2010	Retirement, due to injury.
Josh Carr	Port Adelaide	19 July 2010	Retirement, effective after Round 17 match against Adelaide.
Henry Playfair (rookie)	Sydney	20 July 2010	Retirement, suffered a serious back injury in the round 14 match against Richmond.
Brian Donnelly (rookie)	Adelaide	20 July 2010	Retirement, due to homesickness.
Jason Akermanis	Western Bulldogs	21 July 2010	Sacked.
Warren Tredrea	Port Adelaide	27 July 2010	Retirement, due to ankle injury.
Ben Cousins	Richmond	17 August 2010	Retirement, effective at the end of the 2010 season.
James McDonald	Melbourne	19 August 2010	Retirement, effective at the end of the 2010 season.
Andrew McLeod	Adelaide	23 August 2010	Retirement, effective at the end of the 2010 season.
Paul Hasleby	Fremantle	23 August 2010	Retirement, effective at the end of the 2010 season.
Brad Miller	Melbourne	23 August 2010	Delisted.
Daniel Bell	Melbourne	23 August 2010	Delisted.
Trent Hentschel	Adelaide	24 August 2010	Retired.
Troy Selwood	Brisbane Lions	24 August 2010	Delisted.
Corey Jones	North Melbourne	26 August 2010	Retired.
Graham Polak (rookie)	Richmond	27 August 2010	Retired.
Warren Benjamin	North Melbourne	31 August 2010	Delisted.
Conor Meredith (rookie)	North Melbourne	31 August 2010	Delisted.
Alan Obst (rookie)	North Melbourne	31 August 2010	Delisted.
Josh Smith (rookie)	North Melbourne	31 August 2010	Delisted.
Brad Johnson	Western Bulldogs	6 September 2010	Retired.
Shane O'Bree	Collingwood	8 September 2010	Retired.
Sean Rusling	Collingwood	8 September 2010	Retired.
Jarrhan Jacky	Adelaide	9 September 2010	Delisted.
Taylor Gilchrist (rookie)	Sydney	15 September 2010	Delisted.
Jake Orreal (rookie)	Sydney	15 September 2010	Delisted.
Kristin Thornton	Sydney	15 September 2010	Delisted.
Steven King	St Kilda	16 September 2010	Retired.
Chris Hall	Fremantle	17 September 2010	Delisted.
Des Headland	Fremantle	17 September 2010	Retired.
Nathan Eagleton	Western Bulldogs	21 September 2010	Retired.
Scott Harding	Port Adelaide	27 September 2010	Delisted.
Wade Thompson	Port Adelaide	27 September 2010	Delisted.
Cameron Cloke (rookie)	Port Adelaide	27 September 2010	Delisted.
Glenn Dawson (rookie)	Port Adelaide	27 September 2010	Delisted.
Jordan Johns (rookie)	Port Adelaide	27 September 2010	Delisted.
Simon Wiggins	Carlton	30 September 2010	Retired.
Tim Callan	Western Bulldogs	1 October 2010	Delisted.
Paul Medhurst	Collingwood	5 October 2010	Retired.
Tarkyn Lockyer	Collingwood	5 October 2010	Retired.
Jason Laycock	Essendon	6 October 2010	Delisted.
Mark Hutchings (rookie)	St Kilda	11 October 2010	Retired.
Blake McGrath (rookie)	St Kilda	11 October 2010	Retired.
Adam Pattison	St Kilda	11 October 2010	Retired.
Jesse Smith	St Kilda	11 October 2010	Retired.
Leigh Harding	North Melbourne	13 October 2010	Retired.
Max Rooke	Geelong	13 October 2010	Retired.
Ben Bucovaz	Fremantle	13 October 2010	Delisted.
Steven Dodd	Fremantle	13 October 2010	Delisted.
Ryan Murphy	Fremantle	13 October 2010	Delisted.
Brock O'Brien	Fremantle	13 October 2010	Delisted.
Tim Ruffles	Fremantle	13 October 2010	Delisted.
Richard Hadley	Carlton	14 October 2010	Retired.
Alroy Gilligan (rookie)	Richmond	14 October 2010	Delisted.
Tom Hislop	Richmond	14 October 2010	Delisted.
Jordan McMahon	Richmond	14 October 2010	Delisted.
Dean Polo	Richmond	14 October 2010	Delisted.
Relton Roberts (rookie)	Richmond	14 October 2010	Delisted.
Adam Thomson	Richmond	14 October 2010	Delisted.
Ed Barlow	Sydney	15 October 2010	Delisted.
Matt O'Dwyer	Sydney	15 October 2010	Delisted.
Christian Bock (rookie)	Essendon	15 October 2010	Delisted.
Tyson Slattery	Essendon	15 October 2010	Delisted.
Michael Still	Essendon	15 October 2010	Delisted.
John Williams (rookie)	Essendon	15 October 2010	Delisted.
Ryan Gamble	Geelong	19 October 2010	Delisted.
Ranga Ediriwickrama (rookie)	Geelong	19 October 2010	Delisted.
Beau Dowler	Hawthorn	19 October 2010	Delisted.
Rhan Hooper	Hawthorn	19 October 2010	Delisted.
Michael Johnston (rookie)	Hawthorn	19 October 2010	Delisted.
Jarrod Kayler-Thomson (rookie)	Hawthorn	19 October 2010	Delisted.
Garry Moss (rookie)	Hawthorn	19 October 2010	Delisted.
Beau Muston	Hawthorn	19 October 2010	Delisted.
Carl Peterson (rookie)	Hawthorn	19 October 2010	Delisted.
Wayde Skipper (rookie)	Hawthorn	19 October 2010	Delisted.
Cameron Stokes (rookie)	Hawthorn	19 October 2010	Delisted.
Simon Taylor	Hawthorn	19 October 2010	Delisted.
Travis Tuck	Hawthorn	19 October 2010	Delisted.
Joe Anderson	Carlton	20 October 2010	Delisted.
Steven Browne	Carlton	20 October 2010	Delisted.
Joshua Donaldson (rookie)	Carlton	20 October 2010	Delisted.
Brad Fisher	Carlton	20 October 2010	Delisted.
Chris Johnson	Carlton	20 October 2010	Delisted.
Rhys O'Keeffe	Carlton	20 October 2010	Delisted.
Caleb Tiller	Carlton	20 October 2010	Delisted.
Jay Nash	Port Adelaide	26 October 2010	Delisted.
Matthew Westhoff	Port Adelaide	26 October 2010	Delisted.
Travis Johnstone	Brisbane Lions	28 October 2010	Delisted.
Broc McCauley (rookie)	Brisbane Lions	28 October 2010	Delisted.
Bart McCulloch	Brisbane Lions	28 October 2010	Delisted.
Albert Proud	Brisbane Lions	28 October 2010	Delisted.
Sean Yoshiura (rookie)	Brisbane Lions	28 October 2010	Delisted.
Adam Cockie (rookie)	West Coast	28 October 2010	Delisted.
Tim Houlihan	West Coast	28 October 2010	Delisted.
Tony Notte	West Coast	28 October 2010	Delisted.
Matthew Spangher	West Coast	28 October 2010	Delisted.
Will Sullivan (rookie)	West Coast	28 October 2010	Delisted.
Beau Wilkes	West Coast	28 October 2010	Delisted.
Jaxson Barham	Collingwood	29 October 2010	Delisted.
Jarrad Blight	Collingwood	29 October 2010	Delisted.
Jack Carter (rookie)	Collingwood	29 October 2010	Delisted.
Ryan Cook	Collingwood	29 October 2010	Delisted.
Anthony Corrie	Collingwood	29 October 2010	Delisted.
Tristan Francis (rookie)	Collingwood	29 October 2010	Delisted.
Rhys Healey (rookie)	Melbourne	29 October 2010	Delisted.
Daniel Hughes (rookie)	Melbourne	29 October 2010	Delisted.
Paul Johnson	Melbourne	29 October 2010	Delisted.
Tom McNamara	Melbourne	29 October 2010	Delisted.
John Meesen (rookie)	Melbourne	29 October 2010	Delisted.
Tom Allwright (rookie)	Geelong	29 October 2010	Delisted.
Adam Varcoe (rookie)	Geelong	29 October 2010	Delisted.
Jarrad Boumann	Western Bulldogs	29 October 2010	Delisted.
Shane Thorne	Western Bulldogs	29 October 2010	Delisted.
Nathan O'Keefe	North Melbourne	29 October 2010	Delisted.
Cameron Bruce	Melbourne	7 November 2010	Delisted, due to failed contract negotiations.
Jarrod Atkinson	Essendon	9 November 2010	Delisted.
Bachar Houli	Essendon	9 November 2010	Delisted.
Jay Neagle	Essendon	9 November 2010	Delisted.
Robert Eddy	St Kilda	10 November 2010	Delisted.
Mark Hutchings (rookie)	St Kilda	10 November 2010	Delisted.
Blake McGrath (rookie)	St Kilda	10 November 2010	Delisted.
Luke Miles	St Kilda	10 November 2010	Delisted.
Simon Prestigiacomo	Collingwood	10 November 2010	Retired.
Jack Anthony	Collingwood	10 November 2010	Delisted.
Jamason Daniels (rookie)	Western Bulldogs	10 November 2010	Delisted.
Mitch Hahn	Western Bulldogs	10 November 2010	Delisted.
Patrick Rose (rookie)	Western Bulldogs	10 November 2010	Delisted.
Stephen Tiller	Western Bulldogs	10 November 2010	Delisted.
Ashley Hansen	West Coast	17 November 2010	Delisted.

== 2010 national draft ==
The 2010 AFL national draft was held on 18 November at the Gold Coast Convention Centre, the first time in more than a decade that it has been held outside of Melbourne.

^	Denotes player who has been inducted to the Australian Football Hall of Fame
*	Denotes player who has been a premiership player and been selected for at least one All-Australian team
^{+}	Denotes player who has been a premiership player at least once
^{x}	Denotes player who has been selected for at least one All-Australian team
^{#}	Denotes player who has never played in a VFL/AFL home and away season or finals game
^{~}	Denotes player who has been selected as Rising Star

Round	Pick	Player	Recruited from	League	Club
1	1	David Swallow	East Fremantle	WAFL	Gold Coast
1	2	Harley Bennell	Peel Thunder	WAFL	Gold Coast
1	3	Sam Day	Sturt	SANFL	Gold Coast
1	4	Andrew Gaff	Oakleigh Chargers	TAC Cup	West Coast
1	5	Jared Polec	Woodville-West Torrens	SANFL	Brisbane Lions
1	6	Reece Conca	Perth	WAFL	Richmond
1	7	Josh Caddy	Northern Knights	TAC Cup	Gold Coast
1	8	Dyson Heppell	Gippsland Power	TAC Cup	Essendon
1	9	Dion Prestia	Calder Cannons	TAC Cup	Gold Coast
1	10	Daniel Gorringe	Norwood	SANFL	Gold Coast
1	11	Thomas Lynch	Dandenong Stingrays	TAC Cup	Gold Coast
1	12	Lucas Cook	North Ballarat Rebels	TAC Cup	Melbourne
1	13	Seb Tape	Glenelg	SANFL	Gold Coast
1	14	Brodie Smith	Woodville-West Torrens	SANFL	Adelaide
1	15	Billie Smedts	Geelong Falcons	TAC Cup	Geelong
1	16	Ben Jacobs	Sandringham Dragons	TAC Cup	Port Adelaide
1	17	Shaun Atley	Murray Bushrangers	TAC Cup	North Melbourne
1	18	Matthew Watson	Calder Cannons	TAC Cup	Carlton
1	19	Isaac Smith	North Ballarat	VFL	Hawthorn
1	20	Jayden Pitt	Geelong Falcons	TAC Cup	Fremantle
1	21	Jed Lamb	Gippsland Power	TAC Cup	Sydney
1	22	Mitch Wallis (F/S)	Calder Cannons	TAC Cup	Western Bulldogs
1	23	Cameron Guthrie	Calder Cannons	TAC Cup	Geelong
1	24	Jamie Cripps	East Fremantle	WAFL	St Kilda
1	25	Patrick Karnezis	Oakleigh Chargers	TAC Cup	Brisbane Lions
Priority	26	Jack Darling	West Perth	WAFL	West Coast
Compensation	27	Kieran Harper	Eastern Ranges	TAC Cup	North Melbourne
2	28	Ryan Lester	Oakleigh Chargers	TAC Cup	Brisbane Lions
2	29	Scott Lycett	Port Magpies	SANFL	West Coast
2	30	Jake Batchelor	Dandenong Stingrays	TAC Cup	Richmond
2	31	Ariel Steinberg	Bendigo Pioneers	TAC Cup	Essendon
2	32	Josh Green	Clarence	TSL	Brisbane Lions
2	33	Jeremy Howe	Hobart Football Club	TSL	Melbourne
2	34	Patrick McCarthy	Glenelg	SANFL	Carlton
2	35	Ben Newton	South Fremantle	WAFL	Port Adelaide
2	36	Aaron Young	Eastern Ranges	TAC Cup	Port Adelaide
2	37	George Horlin-Smith	Sturt	SANFL	Geelong
2	38	Mitchell Hallahan	Dandenong Stingrays	TAC Cup	Hawthorn
2	39	Jeremy Taylor	Geelong Falcons	TAC Cup	Gold Coast
2	40	Luke Parker	Dandenong Stingrays	TAC Cup	Sydney
2	41	Tom Liberatore (F/S)	Calder Cannons	TAC Cup	Western Bulldogs
2	42	Luke Mitchell	Calder Cannons	TAC Cup	Carlton
2	43	Sam Crocker	Oakleigh Chargers	TAC Cup	St Kilda
2	44	Viv Michie	Oakleigh Chargers	TAC Cup	Fremantle
3	45	Alex Fasolo	East Fremantle	WAFL	Collingwood
3	46	Daniel Farmer	Sandringham Dragons	TAC Cup	Collingwood
3	47	Bradley Helbig	West Adelaide	SANFL	Richmond
3	48	Alex Browne	Oakleigh Chargers	TAC Cup	Essendon
3	49	Jacob Gillbee	Lauderdale	TSL	Gold Coast
3	50	Troy Davis	Geelong Falcons	TAC Cup	Melbourne
3	51	Dean MacDonald	Gippsland Power	TAC Cup	Richmond
3	52	Cam O'Shea	Eastern Ranges	TAC Cup	Port Adelaide
3	53	Tom McDonald	North Ballarat Rebels	TAC Cup	Melbourne
3	54	Jordan Schroder	Calder Cannons	TAC Cup	Geelong
3	55	Angus Litherland	Claremont	WAFL	Hawthorn
3	56	Josh Mellington	Murray Bushrangers	TAC Cup	Fremantle
3	57	Alex Johnson	Oakleigh Chargers	TAC Cup	Sydney
3	58	James Podsiadly	(Promoted rookie)		Geelong
3	59	Tom Ledger	Claremont	WAFL	St Kilda
3	60	Kirk Ugle	Swan Districts	WAFL	Collingwood
4	61	Jarryd Lyons	Sandringham Dragons	TAC Cup	Adelaide
4	62	Jacob Brennan (F/S)	East Fremantle	WAFL	West Coast
4	63	Tom Derickx	Claremont	WAFL	Richmond
4	64	Luke Davis	West Adelaide	SANFL	Essendon
4	65	Claye Beams	(Promoted rookie)		Brisbane Lions
4	66	Paul Puopolo	Norwood	SANFL	Hawthorn
4	67	Andrew McInnes	Dandenong Stingrays	TAC Cup	Carlton
4	68	Cameron Hitchcock	(Promoted rookie)		Port Adelaide
4	69	Cameron Delaney	Geelong Falcons	TAC Cup	North Melbourne
4	70	Nicholas Duigan	Norwood	SANFL	Carlton
4	71	Ben Mabon	North Ballarat Rebels	TAC Cup	North Melbourne
4	72	Pass			Fremantle
4	73	Matthew Spangher	West Coast	AFL	Sydney
4	74	Jayden Schofield	East Fremantle	WAFL	Western Bulldogs
4	75	Arryn Siposs	Dandenong Stingrays	TAC Cup	St Kilda
4	76	Paul Seedsman	Eastern Ranges	TAC Cup	Collingwood
5	77	Trent Stubbs	East Coast	Sydney AFL	Collingwood
5	78	Lewis Stevenson	(Promoted rookie)		West Coast
5	79	Pass			Richmond
5	80	Michael Ross	Gippsland Power	TAC Cup	Essendon
5	81	Jordie McKenzie	(Promoted rookie)		Melbourne
5	82	Ricky Henderson	(Promoted rookie)		Adelaide
5	83	Danny Meyer	(Promoted rookie)		Port Adelaide
5	84	Callum Wilson	(Promoted rookie)		West Coast
5	85	Jeff Garlett	(Promoted rookie)		Carlton
5	86	Pass			Hawthorn
5	87	Michael Barlow	(Promoted rookie)		Fremantle
5	88	Zephaniah Skinner	Nightcliff Tigers	NTFL	Western Bulldogs
5	89	Tom Hill	Northern Knights	TAC Cup	Western Bulldogs
5	90	Ryan Gamble	Geelong	AFL	St Kilda
5	91	Jarryd Blair	(Promoted rookie)		Collingwood
6	92	Lachlan Keeffe	(Promoted rookie)		Collingwood
6	93	Andrew Strijk	(Promoted rookie)		West Coast
6	94	David Gourdis	(Promoted rookie)		Richmond
6	95	Pass			Essendon
6	96	Jake Spencer	(Promoted rookie)		Melbourne
6	97	Matthew Jaensch	(Promoted rookie)		Adelaide
6	98	Ben Speight	(Promoted rookie)		North Melbourne
6	99	David Ellard	(Promoted rookie)		Carlton
6	100	Matt de Boer	(Promoted rookie)		Fremantle
6	101	Mike Pyke	(Promoted rookie)		Sydney
6	102	Brodie Moles	(Promoted rookie)		Western Bulldogs
6	103	Dean Polo	Richmond	AFL	St Kilda
6	104	Tom Young	NSW AFL scholarship		Collingwood
7	105	Pass			Gold Coast
7	106	Ben Howlett	(Promoted rookie)		Essendon
7	107	Luke Thompson	(Promoted rookie)		Adelaide
7	108	Simon White	(Promoted rookie)		Carlton
7	109	Alex Silvagni	(Promoted rookie)		Fremantle
7	110	Andrew Hooper	(Promoted rookie)		Western Bulldogs
7	111	Tom Simpkin	(Promoted rookie)		St Kilda
8	112	Jay van Berlo	(Promoted rookie)		Fremantle

== 2011 pre-season draft ==
The 2011 AFL Pre-season Draft was held on 7 December 2010.

Round	Pick	Player	Recruited from	League	Club
1	1	Nathan Ablett	Gold Coast	VFL	Gold Coast
1	2	Blayne Wilson	Peel Thunder	WAFL	West Coast
1	3	Bachar Houli	Essendon	AFL	Richmond
1	4	Michael Hibberd	Frankston	VFL	Essendon
1	5	Cameron Bruce	Melbourne	AFL	Hawthorn
1	6	Jack Anthony	Collingwood	AFL	Fremantle

== 2011 rookie draft ==
The 2011 AFL Rookie Draft was held immediately after the Pre-season Draft. Greater Western Sydney will take part for the first time, having the first eight selections, with the Gold Coast Football Club having selection nine and then the first selection in each subsequent round.

Round	Pick	Player	Recruited from	League	Selection category	Club
1	1	Steve Clifton	North Ballarat	VFL		Greater Western Sydney
1	2	Rhys Cooyou	East Fremantle	WAFL		Greater Western Sydney
1	3	Jonathan Giles	Sturt	SANFL		Greater Western Sydney
1	4	Andrew Phillips	Lauderdale	TSL		Greater Western Sydney
1	5	Jimmi Savage	Norwood	SANFL		Greater Western Sydney
1	6	Isiah Stevens	Swan Districts	WAFL		Greater Western Sydney
1	7	Pass				Greater Western Sydney
1	8	Pass				Greater Western Sydney
1	9	Joel Tippett	Brisbane Lions	AFL		Gold Coast
1	10	Tim Houlihan	West Coast	AFL		West Coast
1	11	Ben Jakobi	Coburg	VFL		Richmond
1	12	Josh Jenkins	Lake Boga	CMFL		Essendon
1	13	Brad Harvey	Eastern Ranges	TAC Cup		Brisbane Lions
1	14	Daniel Nicholson	University Blues	VAFA		Melbourne
1	15	Timothy Milera	Port Adelaide Magpies	SANFL		Adelaide
1	16	Tom Jonas	Norwood	SANFL		Port Adelaide
1	17	Cameron Pedersen	Box Hill	VFL		North Melbourne
1	18	Ed Curnow	Box Hill	VFL		Carlton
1	19	Sam Menegola	East Fremantle	WAFL		Hawthorn
1	20	Gavin Roberts	Norwood	SANFL		Fremantle
1	21	Max Otten	Oakleigh Chargers	TAC Cup		Sydney
1	22	Luke Dahlhaus	Geelong Falcons	TAC Cup		Western Bulldogs
1	23	Josh Walker	Geelong Falcons	TAC Cup		Geelong
1	24	Thomas Curren	Dandenong Stingrays	TAC Cup		St Kilda
1	25	Thomas Gordon	Oakleigh Chargers	TAC Cup		Collingwood
2	26	Pass				Gold Coast
2	27	Anton Hamp	Claremont	WAFL		West Coast
2	28	Brad Miller	Melbourne	AFL		Richmond
2	29	Jay Neagle	Essendon	AFL		Essendon
2	30	Bart McCulloch	Brisbane Lions	AFL		Brisbane Lions
2	31	Michael Evans	Claremont	WAFL		Melbourne
2	32	Jake von Bertouch	Woodville-West Torrens	SANFL		Adelaide
2	33	Callum Hay	North Adelaide	SANFL		Port Adelaide
2	34	Aaron Mullett	Eastern Ranges	TAC Cup		North Melbourne
2	35	Rhys O'Keeffe	Carlton	AFL		Carlton
2	36	Thomas Schneider	Oakleigh Chargers	TAC Cup		Hawthorn
2	37	Nick Lower	Norwood	SANFL		Fremantle
2	38	Ben Haren	Port Adelaide Magpies	SANFL		Sydney
2	39	Jason Johannisen	East Fremantle	WAFL		Western Bulldogs
2	40	George Burbury	Hobart	TSL		Geelong
2	41	Warrick Andreoli	South Fremantle	WAFL		St Kilda
2	42	Declan Reilly	Sandringham Dragons	TAC Cup		Collingwood
3	43	Pass				Gold Coast
3	44	Jeremy McGovern	Claremont	WAFL		West Coast
3	45	Tom Hislop	Richmond	AFL		Richmond
3	46	Tyson Slattery	Essendon	AFL		Essendon
3	47	Albert Proud	Brisbane Lions	AFL		Brisbane Lions
3	48	Kelvin Lawrence	Peel Thunder	WAFL		Melbourne
3	49	Lachlan Roach	North Adelaide	SANFL		Adelaide
3	50	Jarrad Irons	Perth	WAFL		Port Adelaide
3	51	Wayde Twomey	Swan Districts	WAFL		Carlton
3	52	Derick Wanganeen	Port Adelaide Magpies	SANFL		Hawthorn
3	53	Ben Bucovaz	Fremantle	AFL		Fremantle
3	54	Pass				Sydney
3	55	Ed Barlow	Sydney	AFL		Western Bulldogs
3	56	Jonathan Simpkin	Geelong	AFL		Geelong
3	57	Robert Eddy	St Kilda	AFL		St Kilda
3	58	Jack Perham	East Fremantle	WAFL		Collingwood
4	59	Pass				Gold Coast
4	60	Pass				Richmond
4	61	James Webster	Woy Woy Peninsula	BDFL	NSW AFL scholarship elevation	Essendon
4	62	Broc McCauley	Brisbane Lions	AFL		Brisbane Lions
4	63	Cameron Johnston	Geelong Falcons	TAC Cup		Melbourne
4	64	Ian Callinan	Central District	SANFL		Adelaide
4	65	Mitchell Curnow	Sturt	SANFL		Port Adelaide
4	66	Mitchell Carter	South Fremantle	WAFL		Carlton
4	67	Pass				Hawthorn
4	68	Tim Ruffles	Fremantle	AFL		Fremantle
4	69	Pass				Sydney
4	70	Mitch Hahn	Western Bulldogs	AFL		Western Bulldogs
4	71	Ryan Bathie	Melbourne Tigers	NBL	Basketball scholarship	Geelong
4	72	Jackson Ferguson	Pennant Hills	Sydney AFL	NSW AFL scholarship elevation	St Kilda
4	73	Jye Bolton	Leopold	GFL		Collingwood
5	74	Pass				Gold Coast
5	75	Robert Campbell	Box Hill	VFL		Melbourne
5	76	Pass				Adelaide
5	77	Matthew Westhoff	Port Adelaide	AFL		Port Adelaide
5	78	Blake Bray	Western Suburbs	Sydney AFL	NSW AFL scholarship elevation	Carlton
5	79	Pass				Hawthorn
5	80	Pass				Sydney
5	81	Paul Cribbin	Kildare	GAA	International rookie	Collingwood
6	82	Jake Crawford	Southport	AFLQ		Gold Coast
6	83	Tom McNamara	Melbourne	AFL		Melbourne
6	84	Sam Martyn	NSW/ACT Rams	TAC Cup	NSW AFL scholarship elevation	Adelaide
6	85	Will Langford	UNSW-Eastern Suburbs	Sydney AFL	NSW AFL scholarship elevation	Hawthorn
6	86	Pass				Sydney
7	87	Jack Mahony	Wollongong	Sydney AFL	NSW AFL scholarship elevation	Hawthorn
7	88	Eugene Krueger	East Coast	Sydney AFL		Sydney

== Selections by league ==
National and Pre-season draft selection totals by leagues:

League	Players selected	State
TAC Cup	44	VIC
WAFL	14	WA
SANFL	12	SA
VFL	3	VIC
TSL	3	TAS
NTFL	1	NT
Sydney AFL	1	NSW
