= 2011 Richmond Football Club season =

Richmond Football Club
2011 season
- President: Gary March^{(6th season)}
- Coach: Damien Hardwick^{(2nd season)}
- Captains: Chris Newman^{(3rd season)}
- Home ground: MCG
- Pre-season: Pool stage^{(0-2)}
- AFL season: 12th^{(8-1-13)}
- Finals series: DNQ
- Jack Dyer Medal: Trent Cotchin
- Leading goalkicker: Jack Riewoldt^{(62)}
- Highest home attendance: 83,563^{(round 9. vs Essendon)}
- Lowest home attendance: 10,832^{(round 17. vs Gold Coast}
- Average home attendance: 42,784^{(▲5,322 / ▲14.2%)}
- Club membership: 40,184^{(▲4,224 / ▲11.7%)}

The 2011 season marked the 104th season in which the Richmond Football Club participated in the AFL/VFL. This season was Damien Hardwick's second season as senior coach. It was also the first season Richmond played against the Gold Coast, and was also the first time the club played a home-and-away game at Cazaly's Stadium in Cairns.

== Season summary ==
The start of the 2011 season was hopeful for the Tigers. In round 1, the Tigers were in front at three quarter time, to lose by 20 points to Carlton in the traditional blockbuster. Media commentators and AFL fans alike noted Richmond's improvement. In round 2, the Tigers shocked the AFL world when they drew with grand finalists from the previous year, St Kilda, even with their goal kicking star Jack Riewoldt going down with a concussion in the first quarter.

In rounds 3 and 4, the Tigers suffered significant losses to Hawthorn and Collingwood, but showed promise in their fightback in the third quarter against Collingwood. Their breakthrough came in round 5, when they beat North Melbourne at Etihad Stadium in front of a packed crowd. This started a good run for the Tigers. Richmond defeated Brisbane in round 6, then Fremantle in round 7. This put them just outside the Top 8. They had a narrow loss to the Western Bulldogs in round 8.

In round 9, the Tigers had a big win against Essendon in the traditional "Dreamtime at the G" match after going in the underdogs. The crowd of over 80,000 people were treated to an intense game, with Richmond coming out victorious.

Richmond then had a complete form turn around, with a 15-point loss against bottom-ranked Port Adelaide in Alice Springs after the club decided to host the home game match interstate, a decision that was roundly questioned by fans and the media. The bye followed, then another loss to Sydney. Richmond then had a return to form, beating Brisbane at the Gabba.

Richmond's poor form continued, with straight losses to Melbourne, Carlton, Essendon, Gold Coast and Geelong. The Tigers got a badly needed bye in round 19 and then travelled to Perth in round 20 to face the West Coast Eagles where they were beaten.

Richmond had a win against Sydney in round 21 and then also won their next two games, against Melbourne and Adelaide, but lost their round 24 match to North Melbourne.

== 2010 off-season list changes ==
=== Retirements and delistings ===
Player	Reason	Club games	Career games	Ref
Troy Simmonds	Retired	93	197	
Graham Polak	Retired	38	111	
Ben Cousins	Retired	32	270	
Tom Hislop	Re-rookied	17	24	
Dean Polo	Delisted	56	77	
Jordan McMahon	Delisted	34	148	
Adam Thomson	Delisted	4	32	
Relton Roberts	Delisted	2	2	
Alroy Gilligan	Delisted	0	0	

=== Trades ===
Date	Gained	Lost	Trade partner	Ref
7 October	End of first round compensation pick Pick 51	Richard Tambling	Adelaide	
9 October	Shaun Grigg	Andrew Collins	Carlton	

Note: All traded picks are indicative and do not reflect final selection position

=== National draft ===
Round	Overall pick	Player	State	Position	Team from	League from	Ref
1	6	Reece Conca	WA	Midfielder	Perth	WAFL	
2	30	Jake Batchelor	VIC	Midfielder	Dandenong Stingrays	TAC Cup	
3	47	Brad Helbig	VIC	Defender	West Adelaide	SANFL	
3	51	Dean MacDonald	VIC	Midfielder	Gippsland Power	TAC Cup	
4	63	Tom Derickx	WA	Ruck	Claremont	WAFL	
6	94 (Rookie Promotion)	David Gourdis	VIC	Full Back	Richmond	AFL	

=== Preseason draft ===
Round	Overall pick	Player	Position	Team from	League from	Ref
1	3	Bachar Houli	Half-Back	Essendon	AFL	

=== Rookie draft ===
Round	Overall pick	Player	State	Position	Team from	League from	Ref
1	11	Ben Jakobi	VIC	Midfielder	Coburg	VFL	
2	28	Brad Miller	VIC	Utility	Melbourne	AFL	
3	45	Tom Hislop	VIC	Midfielder	Richmond	AFL	

== 2011 squad ==
Richmond Football Club
Senior list		Rookie list	Coaching staff
2 Will Thursfield; 3 Brett Deledio; 4 Dustin Martin; 6 Shaun Grigg; 8 Jack Riewoldt; 9 Trent Cotchin; 10 Shane Edwards; 12 David Astbury; 14 Bachar Houli; 15 Mitch Farmer; 16 Luke McGuane; 17 Chris Newman(c); 18 Alex Rance; 19 Daniel Connors; 20 Mitch Morton; 21 Shane Tuck; 22 Ben Nason; 23 Daniel Jackson; 25 Angus Graham	26 Robin Nahas; 28 Jake King; 29 Ty Vickery; 30 Reece Conca; 31 Jake Batchelor; 32 Brad Helbig; 33 David Gourdis; 34 Andrew Browne; 35 Matthew White; 36 Dean MacDonald; 37 Jayden Post; 38 Ben Griffiths; 39 Tom Derickx; 40 Kelvin Moore; 41 Nathan Foley; 43 Matt Dea; 44 Troy Taylor; 46 Jeromey Webberley; 48 Dylan Grimes	13 Brad Miller; 27 Tom Hislop; 42 Jamie O'Reilly; 45 Robbie Hicks; 47 Ben Jakobi; 49 Pat Contin; 51 Nick Westoff	Head coach: Damien Hardwick; Assistant coaches: Justin Leppitsch (defence); Adam Potter; Legend: (c) Captain(s); (vc) Vice-captain(s); Long-term injury list; Upgraded rookie; (B) Category B rookie; (vet) Veterans list; (ret) Retired; Updated: 18 August 2016; Source(s): , Coaching staff

== 2011 season ==
=== Pre-season ===
Date	Score	Opponent	Opponent's score	Result	Home/away	Venue	Attendance
Friday, 4 February		All-Stars		Match cancelled	Away	TIO Stadium/ Traeger Park	

Richmond was to have played an exhibition match against the Indigenous All-Stars on 4 February, but the match was cancelled. The match was originally to have been played at TIO Stadium in Darwin, but monsoonal rain made the surface unplayable; the league worked to move the game to Traeger Park in Alice Springs, but after concerns that either the match or the transport of players into and out of Alice Springs could have been affected by Cyclone Yasi, the match was cancelled altogether.

NAB Cup

Round	Date	Score	Opponent	Opponent's score	Result	Home/away	Venue	Attendance
Pool	Saturday, 12 February 7:15 pm	3.5 (23)	Carlton	6.5 (41)	Lost by 18 points	Away	Etihad Stadium	40,300
Pool	Saturday, 12 February 8:20 pm	1.1 (7)	Collingwood	7.8 (50)	Lost by 43 points	Home	Etihad Stadium	40,300

=== Home and away season ===
Round	Date	Score	Opponent	Opponent's score	Result	Home/away	Venue	Attendance	Ladder
1	Thursday, 24 March 7:40 pm	13.6 (84)	Carlton	14.20 (104)	Lost by 20 points	Away	MCG	60,654	14th
2	Friday, 1 April 7:40pm	14.11 (95)	St Kilda	13.17 (95)	Draw	Away	MCG	41,465	12th
3	Saturday, 9 April 7:10pm	6.16 (52)	Hawthorn	17.13 (115)	Lost by 63 points	Home	MCG	46,369	13th
4	Friday, 15 April 7:40pm	13.12 (90)	Collingwood	24.17 (161)	Lost by 71 points	Home	MCG	58,050	14th
5	Sunday, 24 April 4:40pm	17.10 (112)	North Melbourne	14.19 (103)	WON by 9 points	Away	Etihad Stadium	36,461	12th
6	Saturday, 30 April 7:10pm	18.16 (124)	Brisbane Lions	14.14 (98)	WON by 26 points	Home	MCG	37,438	10th
7	Saturday, 7 May 4:10pm	23.10 (148)	Fremantle	14.15 (99)	WON by 49 points	Home	MCG	34,090	9th
8	Sunday, 15 May 1:10pm	18.10 (118)	Western Bulldogs	23.15 (153)	Lost by 35 points	Away	Etihad Stadium	39,141	10th
9	Saturday, 21 May 7:40pm	16.9 (105)	Essendon	13.11 (89)	WON by 16 points	Home	MCG	83,563	9th
10	Saturday, 28 May 8:10pm	10.14 (74)	Port Adelaide	13.11 (89)	Lost by 15 points	Home	TIO Stadium	11,506	9th
11	BYE								9th
12	Sunday, 12 June 2:10 pm	9.11 (65)	Sydney	9.21 (75)	Lost by 10 points	Away	SCG	23,782	11th
13	Saturday, 18 June 7:10 pm	18.17 (125)	Brisbane Lions	14.10 (94)	WON by 31 points	Away	Gabba	21,510	10th
14	Saturday, 25 June 2:10 pm	13.13 (91)	Melbourne	17.16 (118)	Lost by 27 points	Home	MCG	61,900	11th
15	Saturday, 2 July 2:10 pm	12.9 (81)	Carlton	28.16 (184)	Lost by 103 points	Home	MCG	59,650	13th
16	Saturday, 9 July 7:10 pm	9.12 (66)	Essendon	15.15 (105)	Lost by 39 points	Away	MCG	55,442	13th
17	Saturday, 16 July 2:10 pm	9.16 (70)	Gold Coast	12.13 (85)	Lost by 15 points	Home	Cazaly's Stadium	10,382	13th
18	Sunday, 24 July 1:10 pm	7.9 (51)	Geelong	17.11 (113)	Lost by 62 points	Away	Etihad Stadium	33,761	13th
19	BYE								
20	Sunday, 7 August 2:40 pm	14.6 (90)	West Coast	22.15 (147)	Lost by 57 points	Away	Patersons Stadium	38,106	14th
21	Sunday, 14 August 2:10 pm	14.15 (99)	Sydney	7.14 (56)	WON by 43 points	Home	MCG	34,337	13th
22	Sunday, 21 August 4:40 pm	17.15 (117)	Melbourne	17.8 (110)	WON by 7 points	Away	MCG	36,321	12th
23	Sunday, 28 August 12:40 pm	17.19 (121)	Adelaide	15.9 (99)	WON by 22 points	Away	AAMI Stadium	38,023	11th
24	Sunday, 4 September 4:40 pm	13.13 (91)	North Melbourne	15.14 (104)	Lost by 13 points	Home	Etihad Stadium	32,890	12th

== Ladder ==
2011 AFL ladder
Pos	Team	Pld	W	L	D	PF	PA	PP	Pts	
1	Collingwood	22	20	2	0	2592	1546	167.7	80	Finals series
2	Geelong (P)	22	19	3	0	2548	1619	157.4	76	Finals series
3	Hawthorn	22	18	4	0	2355	1634	144.1	72	Finals series
4	West Coast	22	17	5	0	2235	1715	130.3	68	Finals series
5	Carlton	22	14	7	1	2225	1700	130.9	58	Finals series
6	St Kilda	22	12	9	1	1891	1677	112.8	50	Finals series
7	Sydney	22	12	9	1	1897	1735	109.3	50	Finals series
8	Essendon	22	11	10	1	2217	2217	100.0	46	Finals series
9	North Melbourne	22	10	12	0	2106	2082	101.2	40	
10	Western Bulldogs	22	9	13	0	2060	2155	95.6	36	
11	Fremantle	22	9	13	0	1791	2155	83.1	36	
12	Richmond	22	8	13	1	2069	2396	86.4	34	
13	Melbourne	22	8	13	1	1974	2315	85.3	34	
14	Adelaide	22	7	15	0	1742	2193	79.4	28	
15	Brisbane Lions	22	4	18	0	1814	2240	81.0	16	
16	Port Adelaide	22	3	19	0	1718	2663	64.5	12	
17	Gold Coast	22	3	19	0	1534	2726	56.3	12	

Source: AFL ladder
Rules for classification: 1) points; 2) percentage; 3) number of points for.
(P) Premiers

== Awards ==
=== League awards ===
==== All-Australian team ====
	Player	Position	Appearance
Nominated	Brett Deledio	-	-

==== Rising Star ====
Nominations:

Round	Player	Ref
9	Reece Conca	
16	Jake Batchelor	

==== Brownlow Medal tally ====
Player	3 vote games	2 vote games	1 vote games	Total votes	Place
Trent Cotchin	2	4	1	15	17th
Dustin Martin	2	2	2	12	21st
Nathan Foley	1	1	1	6	50th
Brett Deledio	0	2	1	5	63rd
Bachar Houli	3	0	0	3	95th
Jack Riewoldt	0	1	0	2	128th
Ty Vickery	0	0	2	2	128th
Robin Nahas	0	0	2	2	128th
Chris Newman	0	0	1	1	167th
Shaun Grigg	0	0	1	1	167th
Total	8	10	11	55	-

=== Club awards ===
==== Jack Dyer Medal ====
Position	Player	Votes	Medal
1st	Trent Cotchin	236	Jack Dyer Medal
2nd	Brett Deledio	203	Jack Titus Medal
3rd	Dustin Martin	198	Maurie Fleming Medal
4th	Bachar Houli	181	Fred Swift Medal
5th	Ty Vickery	161	Kevin Bartlett Medal

==== Michael Roach Medal ====
Position	Player	Goals
1st	Jack Riewoldt	62
2nd	Ty Vickery	36
3rd	Dustin Martin	33
4th	Robin Nahas	29
5th	Jake King	25
