= Edward Barlow =

Edward Barlow may refer to:

- Edward Barlow (priest) (1639–1719), English priest and mechanician
- Ed Barlow (born 1987), Australian rules footballer

== See also ==
- Eddie Barlow (1940–2005), South African cricketer
