= Jayden Schofield =

Australian rules footballer

Personal information
- Full name: Jayden Glenn Schofield
- Born: 14 May 1992 (age 34)
- Original team: East Fremantle (WAFL)
- Draft: No. 74, 2010 National Draft
- Height: 182 cm (6 ft 0 in)
- Weight: 76 kg (168 lb)
- Position: Defender

Playing career^{1}
Years	Club	Games (Goals)
2011	Western Bulldogs	7 (0)
- ^{1} Playing statistics correct to the end of 2011.

Jayden Glenn Schofield (born 14 May 1992) is a former Australian rules footballer who played in the Australian Football League (AFL) for the Western Bulldogs. He was drafted from the East Fremantle Football Club in the West Australian Football League with the 74th selection in the 2010 AFL draft.

Originally from Geraldton, where he played for the Railways Football Club in the Great Northern Football League, Schofield moved to Perth in 2010 to play for East Fremantle in the Colts (Under 18s) team. He was selected in the Western Australian team at the 2010 AFL Under 18 Championships and was named on the half-back flank in the Colts Team of the Year.

He was delisted from the Western Bulldogs senior list at the end of the 2011 season, in order to return home to Western Australia and deal with personal matters. He played seven senior games with the Western Bulldogs.
