= Tim Houlihan =

Australian rules footballer

Personal information
- Full name: Timothy Houlihan
- Born: 10 February 1989 (age 37)
- Original team: North Ballarat Rebels (Talent League)
- Draft: No. 43, 2006 National Draft; No. 10, 2011 Rookie Draft (re-drafted)
- Debut: Round 9, 2008, West Coast vs. Adelaide, at Subiaco Oval
- Height: 190 cm (6 ft 3 in)
- Weight: 83 kg (183 lb)
- Position: Midfielder

Playing career^{1}
| Years | Club | Games (Goals) |
| 2008–2011 | West Coast | 15 (1) |
- ^{1} Playing statistics correct to the end of 2011.

Timothy Houlihan (born 10 February 1989) is a former Australian rules footballer who played for the West Coast Eagles in the Australian Football League (AFL), and also for East Fremantle in the West Australian Football League (WAFL) and South Adelaide in the South Australian National Football League (SANFL).

== Early life ==
Originally from Harrow in country Victoria, Houlihan moved to South Australia with his mother after his parents' separated, and played for Goolwa Port Elliot Football Club in South Australia's Great Southern Football League. He and his mother, a nurse, later moved to Kaltjiti (Fregon), a community in the APY lands in the state's far north, before finally returning to Victoria, where he played for Harrow Balmoral in the Horsham & District Football League. He was also a talented junior distance runner, winning the 1500m and 3000m races at the 2005 national championships. Playing for the North Ballarat Rebels in the under-18 TAC Cup, Houlihan recorded the best times in the beep test and 3 km time trial at the 2006 AFL Draft Camp, and was subsequently selected by West Coast with pick 43 in the 2006 National Draft. He was very close with teammate Ashton Hams.

== Football career ==
Houlihan made his debut with the Eagles in round 9 of the 2008 season against Adelaide at Subiaco Oval. He managed 15 games across 2008 and 2009, but did not make an appearance at AFL level in 2010. For the 2011 season, Houlihan was moved to West Coast's rookie list but was delisted following at the end of the year.

Houlihan retired before the start of the 2013 season after being diagnosed with a brain trauma injury. He had been knocked out in the last round of the previous season, following a sling tackle, although he had suffered several other concussions throughout his career. His retirement, which came after consultation with specialists in Adelaide, Melbourne, and Perth, made him the second former AFL player to retire due to brain injury, after former Melbourne player Daniel Bell.

During his time on West Coast's playing list, Houlihan played 72 games for East Fremantle in the West Australian Football League (WAFL). Following his delisting in 2011 and his prior to his retirement, he played 19 games for South Adelaide in the South Australian National Football League (SANFL) during 2012.
