= Rhys O'Keeffe =

Australian rules footballer (born 1990)

Personal information
- Full name: Rhys O'Keeffe
- Born: 8 August 1990 (age 36)
- Original team: North Adelaide (SANFL)
- Draft: No. 65, 2008 National Draft, Carlton; No. 35, 2011 Rookie Draft, Carlton
- Height: 188 cm (6 ft 2 in)
- Weight: 86 kg (190 lb)
- Position: Defender

Playing career^{1}
Years	Club	Games (Goals)
2011–2012	Carlton	3 (0)
- ^{1} Playing statistics correct to the end of 2013.

Rhys O'Keeffe (born 8 August 1990) is a former professional Australian rules footballer with the Carlton Football Club in the Australian Football League (AFL).

O'Keeffe played his junior years in Adelaide, nominally as a defender. He joined the North Adelaide Football Club in 2006 to play under-17s, and by the end of 2008, had played a handful of senior games. He also represented South Australia at the Under-18s championships in 2008, and was selected in the Under 18s All-Australian team and named as South Australia's MVP for the tournament.

O'Keeffe was selected in the 2008 AFL National Draft by the Carlton Football Club with its fifth round selection (No. 65 overall). His initial two-year contract was ruined by injury. He managed eight games for VFL-affiliate, the Northern Bullants, at the start of 2009 before succumbing to osteitis pubis, and managed only two VFL games in 2010, with hip and back injuries keeping him out for most of the year. At the end of two years, with almost no senior football to base its decision on, Carlton opted to move O'Keeffe to the rookie list; due to AFL list management procedures, this was achieved by first delisting O'Keeffe, then re-drafting him in the second round of the 2011 rookie draft (No. 35 overall).

O'Keeffe had more continuity in 2011, his third season, playing the full season for the Bullants. He was elevated to Carlton's senior list in place of the injured Andrew Collins prior to Round 14, and made his first AFL appearance that same week, his only for the 2011 season. He missed the first half of the 2012 season with a foot injury, and played a further two AFL matches. He was retained on Carlton's rookie list for 2013.

After three matches in five seasons, O'Keeffe was delisted at the end of the 2013 season. He played four more seasons of SANFL football, first with his junior club North Adelaide from 2014 to 2015, then with Glenelg in 2016 and 2017.
