= Rhys Cooyou =

Australian rules footballer

Personal information
- Full name: Rhys Grantley Cooyou
- Born: 22 March 1991 (age 35)
- Original team: East Fremantle (WAFL)
- Draft: No. 2, 2011 rookie draft
- Height: 183 cm (6 ft 0 in)
- Weight: 70 kg (154 lb)

Playing career^{1}
Years	Club	Games (Goals)
2012	Greater Western Sydney	1 (1)
- ^{1} Playing statistics correct to the end of 2012.

Rhys Grantley Cooyou (born 22 March 1991) is a former professional Australian rules footballer who played for the Greater Western Sydney Giants in the Australian Football League (AFL). He was recruited by the club with the second pick in the 2011 rookie draft. He made his debut in round 22, 2012, against St Kilda at Docklands Stadium.
