= Jack Anthony (footballer) =

Australian rules footballer

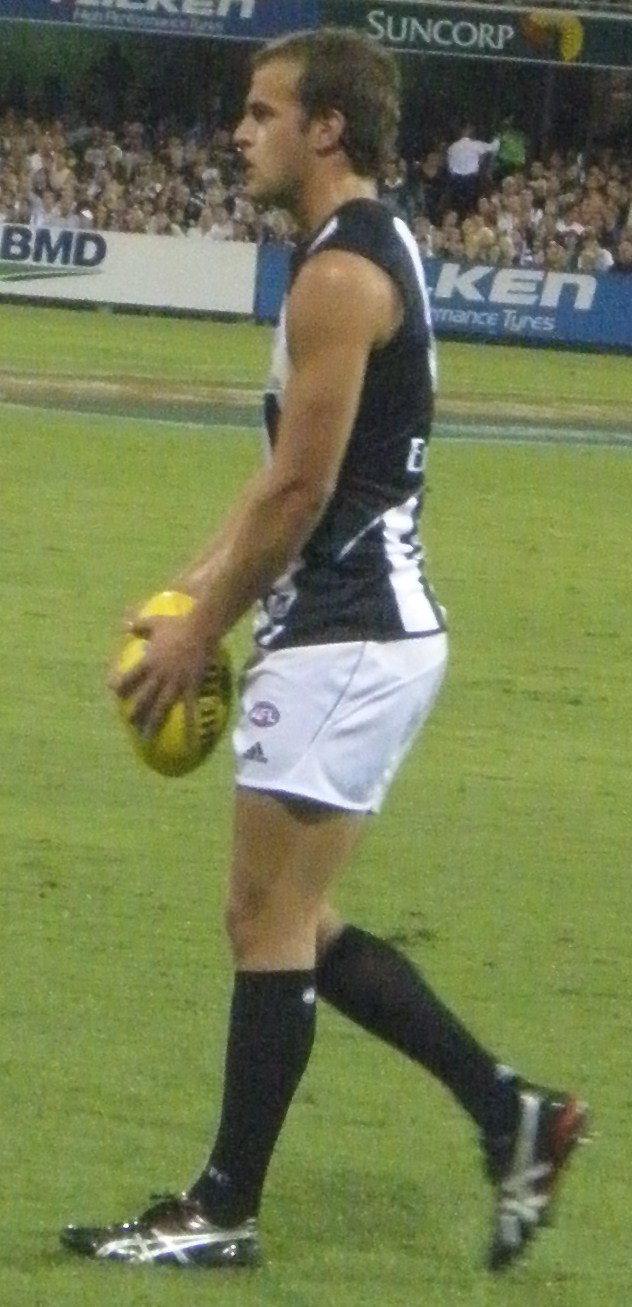
- Jack Anthony during the 2009 AFL season

Personal information
- Full name: John Anthony
- Nickname: Jack
- Born: 19 January 1988 (age 38); Victoria
- Original teams: Diamond Creek (NFL); Northern U18 (TAC Cup)
- Draft: No. 37, 2005 National draft, Collingwood; No. 6, 2011 Pre-Season draft, Fremantle
- Height: 192 cm (6 ft 4 in)
- Weight: 91 kg (201 lb)
- Position: Forward/Defender

Playing career^{1}
Years	Club	Games (Goals)
2008–2010	Collingwood	43 (80)
2011–2012	Fremantle	8 (3)
Total		51 (83)
- ^{1} Playing statistics correct to the end of 2012.

Career highlights
- 2009 Collingwood leading goalkicker

John "Jack" Anthony (born 19 January 1988) is a former professional Australian rules football player who played for the Collingwood Football Club from 2008 to 2010 and the Fremantle Football Club from 2011 to 2012.

== Early life ==
Anthony originally played as a forward during his junior days with Diamond Creek in northern Melbourne. He also played for the Northern Knights in the TAC Cup where he was scouted by Collingwood and selected with the 37th selection of the 2005 AFL draft.

== AFL career ==
=== 2007 ===
Anthony suffered a serious neck injury during the 2007 pre-season but made a successful return to football in 2008.

=== 2008 ===
Anthony made his AFL debut in round three against Richmond Football Club. He kicked two goals straight, but was dropped back to the VFL the following week. He returned to the Collingwood side in Round 13, keeping his spot in the side for the rest of the season. He kicked 25 goals for the season and scored at an accuracy of 81% – the highest percentage of any player in the competition with 25 or more goals. Originally believed to be the replacement for the retired James Clement, Anthony instead played up forward for Collingwood. His best return of the season was kicking four goals in a losing side against North Melbourne Football Club in round 16. Against St Kilda Football Club in round 19 he kicked three goals and had five marks in an important game for the club.

=== 2009 ===
The 2009 season was Anthony's most successful year to date, leading Collingwood's goal kicking with 50 for the season. He had a career high 18 disposals against Western Bulldogs. He also had another career high four goals against the Fremantle Football Club and laid five tackles against the Blues. He was ranked 10th in the AFL for total goals for the season and 16th in goals contributed per game. Anthony kicked a crucial goal in the last 20 seconds of the semi-final against the Adelaide Football Club to give Collingwood victory by five points, after being awarded a free kick. He broke down in tears after the match. Collingwood were defeated by Geelong the following week in the preliminary final. Earlier in the season, Anthony was suspended for one match for headbutting an opponent in the groin.

=== 2010 ===
Coming off a very successful year in 2009, Anthony had a disappointing start to the 2010 season, only averaging half a goal a game, which then forced him to be dropped from the senior side and into the VFL team. Later in the season he was then listed to play in Round 14 when he played his best game for the season and then the following week he was dropped again for playing his worst game of the season. Anthony then made a final attempt of squeezing into the strong Collingwood side by playing a defensive role in Round 21 against Adelaide which did not work out for him. Anthony was replaced by teammate Chris Dawes.

At the conclusion of the 2010 season, Anthony left Collingwood after receiving little interest from other clubs during trade week. He decided not to nominate for the 2010 AFL draft, instead deciding to opt for the Pre-season draft. Fremantle, Carlton and Gold Coast all expressed interest in Anthony but he was eventually drafted by Fremantle.

=== 2011 ===
Anthony began the 2011 season in the West Australian Football League, playing for Subiaco. He broke into the Fremantle side in round 8 in a Western Derby, but did not score a goal during Fremantle's 33-point defeat.

== Post AFL career ==
In an attempt to rekindle his AFL career, Anthony signed with the Northern Blues, Carlton's affiliate in the Victorian Football League, for the 2014 season.

=== Southport ===
At the end of 2014 Anthony signed with the Southport Sharks to play in the 2015 NEAFL season. On 5 June 2016, during the Southport Sharks match against Aspley at Fankhauser Reserve, Anthony was involved in a collision trying to get the footy and had to be stretchered off the ground with a suspected neck injury. The game was called off with the Southport Sharks being awarded match points due to being in front when the game was cancelled.

=== Palm Beach Currumbin ===
In 2018 Anthony signed with the Palm Beach Currumbin Australian Football Club to play in the 2018 SEQAFL Season. In his first match for the club Anthony kicked five goals, helping his team defeat 2017 QAFL grand final rivals Labrador by 22.18 (150) to 11.3 (69).

== Career highlights ==
- 2009 Collingwood leading goal kicker
