= Brent Renouf =

Australian rules footballer (born 1988)

Personal information
- Full name: Brent Renouf
- Born: 3 May 1988 (age 38); New Zealand
- Original team: Southport Sharks
- Draft: No. 24, 2006 national draft
- Debut: Round 12, 2008, Hawthorn vs. Adelaide, at AAMI Stadium
- Height: 200 cm (6 ft 7 in)
- Weight: 102 kg (16 st 1 lb; 225 lb)
- Position: Ruck

Playing career^{1}
Years	Club	Games (Goals)
2007–2011	Hawthorn	52 (9)
2012–2014	Port Adelaide	16 (4)
Total		68 (13)
- ^{1} Playing statistics correct to the end of 2014.

Career highlights
- AFL premiership player: 2008

Brent Renouf (born 3 May 1988) is a former Australian rules football player who played with the Hawthorn Football Club and Port Adelaide Football Club in the Australian Football League.

== Early life ==
Renouf was born in New Zealand and moved to Australia's Gold Coast at an early age where he attended Benowa State High School. He began playing Australian rules football for the Surfers Paradise Demons.

== AFL career ==
Renouf was drafted with selection 24 in the 2006 AFL draft from the Southport Sharks and made his AFL début in round 12 of 2008. In his third game of senior football he was reported for striking Adam Selwood from the West Coast Eagles and suspended for two matches.

His eighth AFL match was the 2008 AFL Grand Final and as part of the winning team, he received a premiership medallion.

In December 2008, Renouf was arrested following a drunken incident on Burwood Road, Hawthorn, in which he climbed over two parked cars, breaking the windscreen of one. Police indicated he would be charged with criminal damage, the Hawthorn Football Club fined him $5,000 and suspended him for two matches.

Renouf required a skin graft after falling into a fire at Surfers Paradise in December 2009.

Due to injuries to Max Bailey, Simon Taylor and Wayde Skipper, Renouf took the job as number one ruckman for the 2010 season.

In 2011 he had his gall bladder removed after suffering an injury playing against Geelong in round 5.

He was traded to Port Adelaide for pick 33 in the 2011 AFL draft. At the end of 2013 he was delisted by Port, but was re-drafted in the rookie draft. He was delisted by the Power at the end of the 2014 season.

Since his retirement, Renouf has spent time as a line coach for the Northern Territory Thunder.

== Statistics ==
Legend
G	Goals	K	Kicks	D	Disposals	T	Tackles
B	Behinds	H	Handballs	M	Marks	H/O	Hit-outs

Season	Team	No.	Games	Totals								Averages (per game)								Votes
Season	Team	No.	Games	G	B	K	H	D	M	T	H/O	G	B	K	H	D	M	T	H/O	Votes
2007	Hawthorn	34	0	—	—	—	—	—	—	—	—	—	—	—	—	—	—	—	—	0
2008^{#}	Hawthorn	34	8	0	0	21	44	65	20	28	82	0.0	0.0	2.6	5.5	8.1	2.5	3.5	10.3	0
2009	Hawthorn	34	15	1	4	29	101	130	30	47	210	0.1	0.3	1.9	6.7	8.7	2.0	3.1	14.0	0
2010	Hawthorn	34	22	4	8	78	136	214	74	71	426	0.2	0.4	3.5	6.2	9.7	3.4	3.2	19.4	2
2011	Hawthorn	34	7	4	1	25	28	53	17	22	120	0.6	0.1	3.6	4.0	7.6	2.4	3.1	17.1	0
2012	Port Adelaide	4	10	2	2	34	49	83	27	20	253	0.2	0.2	3.4	4.9	8.3	2.7	2.0	25.3	0
2013	Port Adelaide	4	5	2	0	12	21	33	8	8	79	0.4	0.0	2.4	4.2	6.6	1.6	1.6	15.8	0
2014	Port Adelaide	4	1	0	1	1	2	3	1	1	13	0.0	1.0	1.0	2.0	3.0	1.0	1.0	13.0	0
Career			68	13	16	200	381	581	177	197	1183	0.2	0.2	2.9	5.6	8.5	2.6	2.9	17.4	2

== Honours and achievements ==
Team

- AFL premiership player (Hawthorn): 2008
