= Simon Taylor (footballer, born 1982) =

Australian rules footballer

Personal information
- Born: 18 August 1982 (age 44)
- Original team: Box Hill Hawks
- Draft: No. 53, 2004 national draft
- Debut: Round 3, 2005, Hawthorn vs. Essendon, at Melbourne Cricket Ground
- Height: 200 cm (6 ft 7 in)
- Weight: 108 kg (238 lb)

Playing career^{1}
Years	Club	Games (Goals)
2005–2010	Hawthorn	85 (16)
- ^{1} Playing statistics correct to the end of 2010.

Simon Taylor (born 18 August 1982) is a former Australian rules football player who played with the Hawthorn Football Club in Australian Football League. A ruckman, Taylor was selected by Hawthorn with pick 53 in the 2004 national draft.

Taylor prior to playing for the Box Hill Hawks played for the Tasmanian Devils Football Club in the VFL

After sharing the ruck responsibilities with Robert Campbell for most of the 2007 and 2008 seasons, he was overlooked for the 2008 AFL Grand Final, with the backup ruck position being taken by Brent Renouf. In 2009, he played 18 games, more than Campbell or Renouf, but was not as effective as earlier years, leading the Hawks to look to recruit a ruckman to replace Campbell who retired due to injury.

Taylor broke his ankle during a pre-season game against North Melbourne, he missed most of the 2010 season.

Because of persistent niggling injuries and never really demonstrating the qualities that were expected of him through his career, he was delisted from the club on 19 October 2010, along with fellow ruckman Wayde Skipper

== Statistics ==
Legend
G	Goals	K	Kicks	D	Disposals	T	Tackles
B	Behinds	H	Handballs	M	Marks	H/O	Hit-outs

Season	Team	No.	Games	Totals								Averages (per game)								Votes
Season	Team	No.	Games	G	B	K	H	D	M	T	H/O	G	B	K	H	D	M	T	H/O	Votes
2005	Hawthorn	43	17	8	4	39	63	102	30	20	135	0.5	0.2	2.3	3.7	6.0	1.8	1.2	7.9	0
2006	Hawthorn	13	7	0	1	14	27	41	12	5	69	0.0	0.1	2.0	3.9	5.9	1.7	0.7	9.9	0
2007	Hawthorn	13	24	4	2	83	126	209	71	58	336	0.2	0.1	3.5	5.3	8.7	3.0	2.4	14.0	0
2008	Hawthorn	13	18	3	0	45	120	165	43	35	270	0.2	0.0	2.5	6.7	9.2	2.4	1.9	15.0	0
2009	Hawthorn	13	18	1	2	41	118	159	43	48	419	0.1	0.1	2.3	6.6	8.8	2.4	2.7	23.3	0
2010	Hawthorn	13	1	0	0	1	1	2	0	1	15	0.0	0.0	1.0	1.0	2.0	0.0	1.0	15.0	0
Career			85	16	9	223	455	678	223	167	1244	0.2	0.1	2.6	5.4	8.0	2.6	2.0	14.6	0
