= Tom Ledger =

Australian rules footballer (born 1992)

Personal information
- Full name: Tom Ledger
- Born: 17 March 1992 (age 34)
- Original team: Claremont (WAFL)
- Draft: No. 59, 2010 National Draft, St Kilda
- Height: 178 cm (5 ft 10 in)
- Weight: 70 kg (154 lb)
- Position: Midfielder

Club information
- Current club: St Kilda
- Number: 37

Playing career^{1}
Years	Club	Games (Goals)
2011–2013	St Kilda	8 (4)
- ^{1} Playing statistics correct to the end of 2013.

Tom Ledger (born 17 March 1992) is an Australian rules footballer who played for the St Kilda Football Club in the Australian Football League (AFL) and Claremont in the West Australian Football League (WAFL).

Ledger made his first appearance at the senior level in the 2011 AFL season in Round 11, against Collingwood.

At the end of the 2013 season, Ledger requested to be delisted by St Kilda, in the hope of being recruited by another club. However he was overlooked by all other AFL clubs and returned to play for Claremont in the WAFL.

Ledger studied law during his time at St Kilda.
