= Nick Duigan =

Australian rules footballer

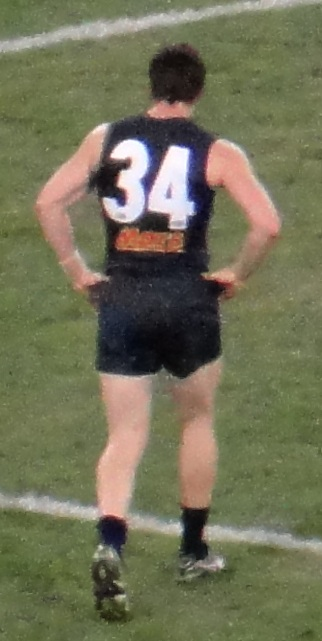

Personal information
- Full name: Nick Duigan
- Born: 7 September 1984 (age 42)
- Original team: Norwood (SANFL)
- Draft: No. 70, 2010 National Draft, Carlton
- Height: 186 cm (6 ft 1 in)
- Weight: 88 kg (194 lb)
- Position: Defender

Playing career^{1}
Years	Club	Games (Goals)
2011–2013	Carlton	43 (10)
- ^{1} Playing statistics correct to the end of 2013.

Nick Duigan /ˈdaɪɡən/ (born 7 September 1984) is a former professional Australian rules footballer who played for the Carlton Football Club in the Australian Football League (AFL).

== Background ==
Originally from South Australia, Duigan grew up supporting the Adelaide Crows and playing junior football for Pembroke School in Adelaide and also was a junior player at the Walkerville Football Club. Throughout his junior career, he was troubled by injuries and had a hard time stringing a series of games together until after the age of twenty.

Duigan is a registered psychologist; throughout his early 20s, Duigan studied psychology at university, and by the end of 2010, then aged 26, Duigan had completed his master's degree in psychology. During the same period, Duigan played football semi-professionally for the Norwood Football Club in the South Australian National Football League (SANFL), primarily as a defender. He appeared in a total of 87 senior games for the Redlegs during that time, and was the club's vice-captain in 2010. He finished tenth in the 2010 Magarey Medal, and kicked the game-winning goal in Norwood's come-from-behind preliminary final victory against the Eagles.

Duigan is the son of former South Australian Member of Parliament for the seat of Adelaide, Michael Duigan.

== AFL career ==
Duigan left Norwood at the end of 2010, intending to travel to Sudan for a year to do volunteer work. However, he also nominated for the AFL draft, and was drafted by the Carlton Football Club with its fifth selection (No. 70 overall). The selection surprised many, as it was very rare at the time for a player as old as Duigan (26), and without previous AFL experience, to be drafted. Duigan was given guernsey number 34.

Playing in defence, Duigan impressed for the Blues during the pre-season, and he made his senior AFL debut in the club's first round match against Richmond. He immediately became a regular in the Carlton backline in the 2011, and he was noted for both his ability and his courage. He played twenty-two games for the year and won Carlton's Best First-Year Player award. He played sixteen matches in 2012.

In 2013, Duigan was elevated to the club's five-man leadership group; however, he struggled to retain his place in the team on form, playing only three home-and-away matches for the year. He was famously brought into Carlton's 2013 elimination final team as a late replacement after Brock McLean was injured at the very end of the warm-up, and he kicked four goals as Carlton overcame a 32-point deficit to defeat Richmond in front of a crowd of 94,690.

Duigan had intended to continue playing in 2014, but after struggling with an ongoing knee injury during the first month of the pre-season, he announced his retirement on 9 December 2013.

== Post-AFL career ==
In 2014, Duigan moved Geraldton, Western Australia, to take a role with mental health services provider Youth Focus. He also took a role as coach, with ambitions to play should his knee heal sufficiently, with the Towns Football Club in the Great Northern Football League.
