= Wayde Twomey =

Australian rules footballer (born 1986)

Personal information
- Full name: Wayde Twomey
- Born: 21 January 1986 (age 40)
- Original team: Swan Districts (WAFL)
- Draft: No. 51, 2011 Rookie Draft, Carlton
- Height: 184 cm (6 ft 0 in)
- Weight: 82 kg (181 lb)
- Position: Midfielder / Defender

Playing career^{1}
Years	Club	Games (Goals)
2011	Carlton	2 (1)
- ^{1} Playing statistics correct to the end of 2011.

Career highlights
- WAFL Premiership Player: 2010; Simpson Medal: 2013; Swan Districts best and fairest 2013; Subiaco best and fairest 2014

Wayde Twomey (born 21 January 1986) is an Australian rules footballer who played for the Carlton Football Club in the Australian Football League (AFL).

== Background and state career ==
Twomey was raised in Tarneit, Victoria. He played junior football at the Hoppers Crossing Football Club, and played TAC Cup football for the Western Jets in 2003 and 2004. He nominated for the 2004 AFL National Draft, but was not selected.

Following this, Twomey earned his primary living as an electrician. At the same time, Twomey joined the Werribee Football Club in the Victorian Football League, where he was the reserves best and fairest in 2005. He made his senior debut for the Tigers in 2006, and played there until 2007. When not selected for the Tigers, he played for the Port Melbourne Colts in the Western Region Football League.

In 2008, Twomey moved to Western Australia and they signed with the Swan Districts Football Club. In a successful three-year stint at Bassendean, Twomey played 60 senior games, primarily as rebounding defender and occasional midfielder. He finished in the top five of the Swans' best and fairest in each of his three seasons with the club, and was a member of the Swans' 2010 premiership team, playing a key role in the memorable one-point victory over Claremont in the 2010 WAFL Grand Final.

== Professional career ==
Twomey was recruited as a rookie by the Carlton Football Club with its third round selection in the 2011 AFL rookie draft (#51 overall). He was given guernsey #39. Twomey played the majority of the season for Carlton's VFL-affiliate, the Northern Bullants, but was elevated to the senior list and played two matches for Carlton during the year, including his debut in the round 17 Richard Pratt Cup match against Collingwood. At the conclusion of the 2011 Australian Football League season, Twomey was delisted by the Carlton Football Club.

== Return to state football ==
Twomey returned to Western Australia to play for Swan Districts from 2012, and in 2013, Twomey again finished third in the best and fairest, and won the Simpson Medal as best on ground for the WAFL representative team in its victory against the VFL, kicking five goals in the match. In 2014, he crossed to the Subiaco Football Club, where he was part of the 2014 and 2015 premiership teams and finished third in the 2014 best and fairest. Twomey remains at Subiaco as of 2017.
