= Ed Barlow =

Australian rules footballer (born 1987)

Personal information
- Full name: Ed Barlow
- Nickname: Cheese
- Born: 27 January 1987 (age 39)
- Original team: Oakleigh Chargers (TAC Cup)
- Draft: No. 60, 2006 Rookie Draft, Sydney; No. 55, 2011 Rookie Draft, Western Bulldogs
- Height: 195 cm (6 ft 5 in)
- Weight: 94 kg (207 lb)
- Position: Utility

Playing career^{1}
| Years | Club | Games (Goals) |
| 2007–2010 | Sydney | 26 (18) |
| 2011 | Western Bulldogs | 8 (4) |
| Total | | 34 (22) |
- ^{1} Playing statistics correct to the end of 2011.

Ed Barlow (born 27 January 1987) is an Australian rules footballer who formerly played for the Western Bulldogs and the Sydney Swans in the Australian Football League (AFL). He currently plays for the Aspley Hornets Football Club.

Barlow was originally from Tathra, New South Wales, representing his state in the under-15s which made him eligible for the Swans' pre-listing. He attended Scotch College, Melbourne as a boarder from 2003 to 2005. 2005 saw him as the sixtieth pick in the rookie draft. Given a second year on Sydney's rookie list after playing impressively in the reserves in 2006, he made the most of his chances when he played with the club's seniors towards the end of the 2007 season.

His debut came in round 20 against the Brisbane Lions and he gathered 18 possessions in a match that ended in a 9.9 (63) – 8.15 (63) draw.

He was promoted to the senior list for the 2008 season. He was not offered a new contract after 2010 after playing just 25 games in four seasons.

Barlow was then drafted by the Western Bulldogs with the 55th selection in the 2011 Rookie Draft. Barlow made his debut for the dogs in round 12 2011 against the saints at Etihad Stadium, then was amongst the best the next week against Adelaide at the same venue. He kicked his 1st goal for the dogs in that match.

At the end of the 2011 season he was not offered a new contract by the club.

On 1 March 2012, he ended weeks of speculation by signing with the Wangaratta Magpies in the Ovens and Murray Football League.

In February 2017, Ed accepted a position within the University of Queensland's Master of Psychology (Sport) program as a provisional psychologist.

Ed is now the Psychologist at the Hawthorn Football Club.
