= Graham Polak =

Australian rules footballer, born 1984

Personal information
- Full name: Graham Polak
- Born: 16 June 1984 (age 42); Western Australia
- Original team: East Fremantle (WAFL)
- Draft: 4th overall, 2001; Fremantle
- Height: 194 cm (6 ft 4 in)
- Weight: 92 kg (203 lb)
- Position: Centre half back/centre half forward

Playing career^{1}
Years	Club	Games (Goals)
2002–2006	Fremantle	73 (9)
2007–2010	Richmond	38 (16)
Total		111 (25)
- ^{1} Playing statistics correct to the end of 2010.

Career highlights
- AFL Rising Star Nominee 2003

Graham Polak (born 16 June 1984) is a former Australian rules footballer who played for the Fremantle Football Club and the Richmond Football Club in the Australian Football League (AFL).

== Fremantle career ==
Polak was raised in Geraldton, Western Australia.

Polak began his AFL career with the Fremantle Football Club after being drafted from East Fremantle in the WAFL with the fourth selection in the 2001 AFL draft (behind future stars of the game Luke Hodge, Luke Ball and Chris Judd.) He made his debut in round 1, 2002 in a Western Derby against the West Coast Eagles which Fremantle lost. In 2003 he had his best season to date, only missing one game (round 3) and playing in Fremantle's first ever finals match. He was nominated for the AFL Rising Star award in Round 9 and finished second in the end of year voting behind Sam Mitchell and ahead of Luke Ball and Daniel Wells.

Polak only played 12 games in 2005 and failed to improve due to a pre-season injury. He was recalled in round 3 of 2006, and due to injuries to Aaron Sandilands and Justin Longmuir, was often played in the new role of a ruck, but still only managed 11 games for the season, and was overlooked for the finals.

== Richmond career ==
On 13 October 2006, Polak was traded to the Richmond Football Club following speculation all week that he would be the key to the mega deal involving Collingwood's Chris Tarrant being traded to the Dockers. Since being at the Tigers, Polak has mainly played at centre-half back and finished seventh in Richmond's 2007 best and fairest award after playing in all 22 games for the season.

=== Tram collision ===
Late on 28 June 2008, Polak was struck by a Melbourne tram, and was placed in an induced coma with bruising to the brain, putting his football career in jeopardy. Two days after being struck by the tram Polak was able to respond to commands and squeeze a family member's hand. The hospital has stated that the signs are 'encouraging'. A week later, Polak was transferred to Epworth Rehabilitation Centre, where he began to recall aspects of the game he played against Carlton on the day of his accident. He also recognised loved ones and was able to communicate.

In late 2008, Richmond applied to the AFL to transfer Polak to the rookie list, primarily to free up a position on their senior list that would enable them to recruit Ben Cousins as well as re-draft David Gourdis. The AFL rejected this request, but Richmond still managed to select both players, Cousins in the Pre-season draft and Gourdis in the rookie draft. Polak returned to training during the 2009 pre-season and was selected to play in a NAB Challenge practice match against St Kilda.

Polak was named to make his return to the AFL in the Round 21 match against Hawthorn, nearly 13 months after being struck by the tram.

=== Comeback ===
Polak was de-listed Richmond at the conclusion of the 2009 AFL season, only to be re-drafted by the Tigers in the 2009 AFL rookie draft as a mature-aged rookie.

On 26 June 2010 and 31 July 2010 Polak suffered concussions while playing for Coburg in the VFL, again putting his football career in jeopardy.

=== Retirement ===
On 27 August 2010 Polak announced his retirement from AFL football. He returned to Perth to play in the West Australian Football League, but transferred from East Fremantle to East Perth. After suffering from further on-field head injuries, he retired from all football in June 2011.
