= Wayde Skipper =

Australian rules footballer (born 1983)

Personal information
- Born: 1 March 1983 (age 43)
- Original team: West Perth (WAFL)
- Draft: No. 70, 2000 national draft
- Debut: Round 4, 2003, Western Bulldogs vs. Essendon, at Telstra Dome
- Height: 193 cm (6 ft 4 in)
- Weight: 90 kg (198 lb)
- Position: Ruckman

Playing career^{1}
Years	Club	Games (Goals)
2001–2009	Western Bulldogs	45 (19)
2010	Hawthorn	15 (1)
Total		60 (20)
- ^{1} Playing statistics correct to the end of 2010.

Wayde Skipper (born 1 March 1983) is an Australian rules footballer who has played for the Hawthorn Football Club and the Western Bulldogs . Standing at 193 cm, Skipper won the 2003 best first year player for his original club the Western Bulldogs.

Skipper was drafted to the Western Bulldogs through the 2000 AFL draft as a 5th round selection, number 70 overall. Not noted for kicking goals, Skipper kicked 5 goals in Round 17 of 2005 against Geelong at the Telstra Dome, with his first being a contender for Goal of the Year, with a left foot banana from the boundary line. The Dogs won the game.

In 2007, Skipper took a big pack mark in the goalsquare against St Kilda in Round 18. The goal he kicked put the Dogs in front with a minute remaining. The Saints however, after a 75m pass from Jason Gram from defence to Nick Riewoldt 50 metres out on the boundary line, kicked a point through Riewoldt on the siren to level the scores for the 4th draw of the season.

Skipper played one game in 2008 and did not play an AFL game in 2009.

At the end of the 2009 season, Skipper was delisted from the Western Bulldogs, and picked up by Hawthorn with selection 13 in the Rookie Draft on 15 December 2009.

On the eve of the 2010 season, with the Hawks' ruck stocks thin, Skipper suffered another setback with a hamstring injury keeping him out of the team. He made his debut for the Hawks in round eight against Richmond.

Skipper played his fiftieth game against Adelaide in Launceston.

He was delisted by Hawthorn on 19 October 2010. Hawthorn felt that new recruit David Hale and the raw talent of Brent Renouf, would make Skipper surplus to requirements for the 2011 season.

Skipper moved over to the Port Melbourne in the VFL. He was part of their premiership team in 2011.

In the 2014 and 2015 seasons, Skipper played for Hoppers Crossing in the Western Region Football League. He was the Barry Priest Medal winner for best-and-fairest in the division 1 competition in 2015.

In the 2018 season, Skipper played for Point Cook in the Western Region Football League, Skipper played a crucial role in Point Cook’s inaugural senior Premiership in the Division 2 competition. He also claimed his first selection in the WRFL Division 2 team of the year.

== Statistics ==
Legend
G	Goals	K	Kicks	D	Disposals	T	Tackles
B	Behinds	H	Handballs	M	Marks	H/O	Hit-outs

Season	Team	No.	Games	Totals								Averages (per game)								Votes
Season	Team	No.	Games	G	B	K	H	D	M	T	H/O	G	B	K	H	D	M	T	H/O	Votes
2001	Western Bulldogs	34	0	—	—	—	—	—	—	—	—	—	—	—	—	—	—	—	—	0
2002	Western Bulldogs	34	0	—	—	—	—	—	—	—	—	—	—	—	—	—	—	—	—	0
2003	Western Bulldogs	34	12	2	2	28	36	64	24	9	43	0.2	0.2	2.3	3.0	5.3	2.0	0.8	3.6	0
2004	Western Bulldogs	34	5	2	1	15	12	27	8	7	9	0.4	0.2	3.0	2.4	5.4	1.6	1.4	1.8	0
2005	Western Bulldogs	34	9	6	4	31	21	52	19	9	34	0.7	0.4	3.4	2.3	5.8	2.1	1.0	3.8	0
2006	Western Bulldogs	34	12	5	7	52	42	94	31	18	127	0.4	0.6	4.3	3.5	7.8	2.6	1.5	10.6	0
2007	Western Bulldogs	34	6	4	1	57	19	76	26	17	53	0.7	0.2	9.5	3.2	12.7	4.3	2.8	8.8	0
2008	Western Bulldogs	34	1	0	0	4	5	9	2	1	10	0.0	0.0	4.0	5.0	9.0	2.0	1.0	10.0	0
2009	Western Bulldogs	34	0	—	—	—	—	—	—	—	—	—	—	—	—	—	—	—	—	0
2010	Hawthorn	40	15	1	8	80	71	151	39	46	208	0.1	0.5	5.3	4.7	10.1	2.6	3.1	13.9	0
Career			60	20	23	267	206	473	149	107	484	0.3	0.4	4.5	3.4	7.9	2.5	1.8	8.1	0
