= Dean Polo =

Australian rules footballer, born 1986

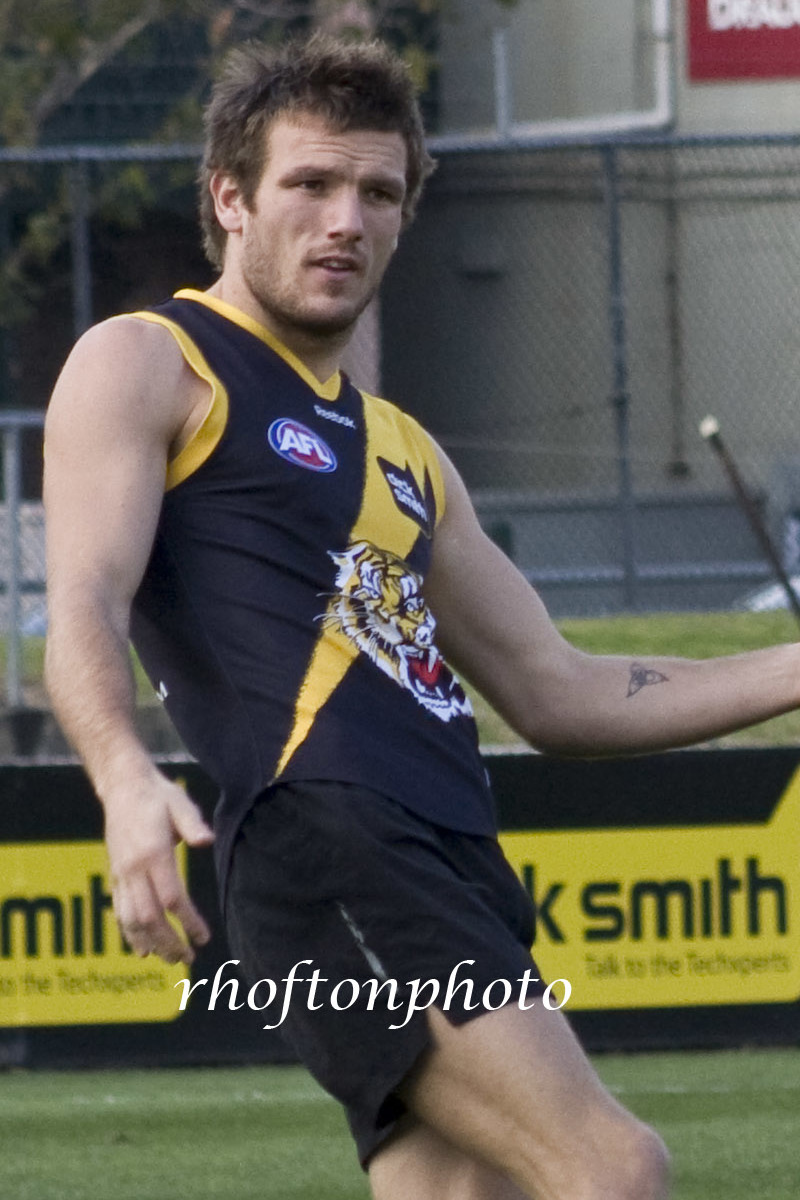
- Polo in August 2009

Personal information
- Full name: Dean Polo
- Born: 5 August 1986 (age 40); Gippsland, Victoria
- Original team: Wy Yung / Gippsland Power
- Draft: 20th overall, 2004; Richmond
- Height: 187 cm (6 ft 2 in)
- Weight: 81 kg (179 lb)
- Position: Half back flank

Playing career^{1}
Years	Club	Games (Goals)
2005–2010	Richmond	56 (11)
2011–2012	St Kilda	21 (7)
Total		77 (18)
- ^{1} Playing statistics correct to the end of 2012.

Career highlights
- Yiooken Award 2006

Dean Polo (born 5 August 1986) is a former Australian rules footballer who played for the Richmond Football Club and the St Kilda Football Club in the Australian Football League (AFL).

== Playing career ==
=== 2005–2010: Career with Richmond ===
Polo was drafted by the Richmond Football Club with the 20th selection in the 2004 AFL draft.

In his first season at Richmond in 2005, Polo initially struggled with the move from a small country town to the "big city", and was dropped to the Coburg reserves early on in the season. However, in the second half of the season his performances earned him a promotion to the Coburg seniors, where his performances continued to improve to the point where he was considered a possibility to debut for Richmond towards the end of the 2005 season.

After starring for Coburg in the early part of the 2006 season, Polo made his AFL debut in Round 6 against Essendon in the "Dreamtime at the 'G" game. He starred in the game, collecting 28 disposals and kicking three goals, helping Richmond beat their arch-rivals Essendon. Polo was rewarded with the Yiooken Award for his best-on-ground performance and was also nominated for the 2006 NAB Rising Star award.

In 2010 Polo was banned by the club for one week following a drunken incident in a Sydney hotel. This only added to the pain of Richmond's previously-winless start to the season. On 14 October 2010 he was delisted by the Tigers after 56 senior games in his six seasons at the club.

=== 2011–2012: Career with St Kilda ===
On 18 November 2010, Polo was drafted by St Kilda for the 2011 season. He played 15 games and kicked 6 goals in his first season at the Saints.

Polo was delisted by St Kilda after the 2012 season.
