= Shaun Grigg =

Australian rules footballer

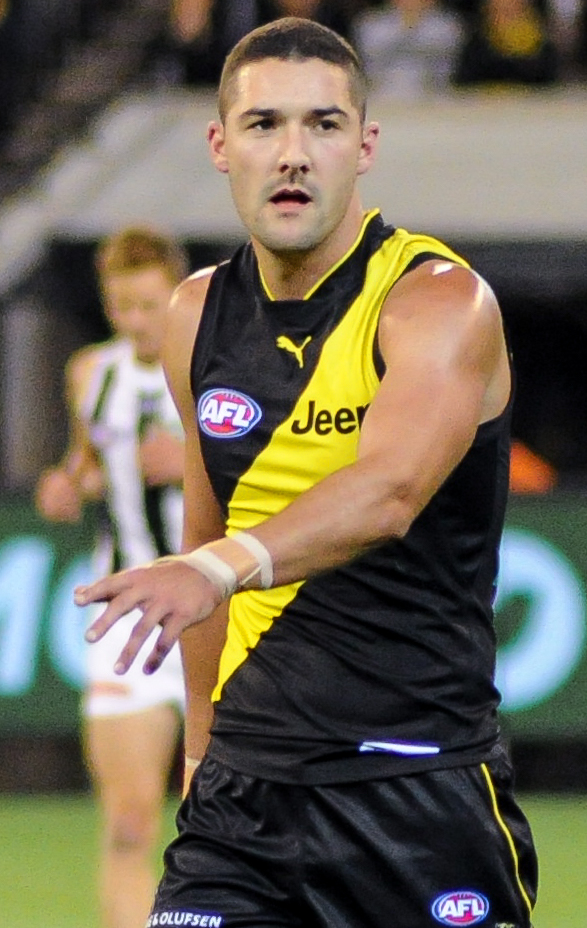
- Grigg with Richmond in March 2017

Personal information
- Nickname: Grigga
- Born: 19 April 1988 (age 38)
- Original teams: Redan (BFL); North Ballarat Rebels (TAC Cup)
- Draft: No. 19, 2006 AFL National draft: Carlton
- Debut: Round 14, 2007, Carlton vs. Melbourne, at MCG
- Height: 191 cm (6 ft 3 in)
- Weight: 85 kg (187 lb)
- Position: Midfielder

Playing career
Years	Club	Games (Goals)
2007–2010	Carlton	43 (10)
2011–2019	Richmond	171 (86)
Total		214 (96)

International team honours
Years	Team	Games (Goals)
2011	Australia	2 (0)

Career highlights
- AFL: AFL premiership player: 2017; Richmond Life Member: 2018; AFL Rising Star nominee: 2008; Junior: U-18 All-Australian: 2006

Shaun Grigg (born 19 April 1988) is a former professional Australian rules footballer who played 171 games for Richmond and 43 games for Carlton over a 13-year AFL career. He was a premiership player with Richmond in 2017, an Under 18 All Australian and twice placed in the top five in Richmond club best and fairests.

== Early life and junior football ==
Grigg grew up in the Victorian country town of Linton, 33 kilometres south-west of Ballarat. He attended high school at St Patrick's College. He was part of the school's First XVIII football side which won the coveted Herald Sun Shield in 2005. He played with Redan in his younger years before joining the North Ballarat Rebels in the TAC Cup. In 2006 he represented the Victorian Country side at the national Under 18 championships where he won All-Australian selection. At the 2006 AFL Draft Combine he recorded a top 10 time in the 20 metre sprint.

== AFL career ==
=== Carlton (2007-2010) ===
Grigg was selected by Carlton with the club's second pick and the 19th overall in the 2006 AFL National draft.

He suffered a shoulder injury early in the 2007 season and struggled as a result. He played matches early in the season with Carlton's VFL-affiliate, the Northern Bullants. Grigg made his AFL debut against Melbourne in Round 14, 2007 and played a total of 5 games for the season.

Grigg earned a regular position in the Carlton team throughout 2008, playing 20 senior games and receiving a nomination for the NAB Rising Star award in Round 19. He kicked his first career goal in Round 4, 2008 in a match against Collingwood.

Over the next two seasons however, Grigg struggled to play regularly in the senior side, playing only a combined total of 18 games for the club.

In October 2010 Grigg asked to be traded from the Carlton Football Club with Richmond his desired trade destination. He cited a desire for greater on-field opportunities as his key reason for seeking the move. A deal was finalised eight days later, with Grigg involved in a straight swap for Tigers' midfielder Andrew Collins. He had played 43 games for the club over his four-year tenure.

=== Richmond (2011-2019) ===
Grigg made his debut for Richmond in Round 1 of the 2011 season in a match against his former club Carlton at the MCG. He finished his first season at Richmond having played 21 games and recording an average of 22 disposals per game. It was a then-career best year in all major statistical categories including total disposals, marks, tackles and goals.

In 2012 Grigg was one of the most improved players in the league. He kicked a career-best three goals in a Round 7 clash with Sydney. He played all 22 matches that season and recorded a career best 561 disposals, good for fourth best at the club. He finished in fifth place in the club'sbest & fairest award, receiving the Kevin Bartlett Medal for his efforts. Grigg also polled a career best 11 votes in the Brownlow Medal, placing third at the club that season.

He would again play all possible matches in 2013, including a role in his first final at Richmond; a loss against former club Carlton. He polled 5 votes in the Brownlow medal count that year, placing equal fifth of all Richmond players that season.

2014 saw Grigg's first injury affected season at Richmond. After playing in the club's first 10 matches, he went on to miss the next eight due to a hamstring injury sustained in a Round 11 match-up with Essendon. He again played in the club's finals campaign, kicking a goal in an elimination final defeat at the hands of Port Adelaide. Grigg played as a tagger for much of the season. He finished the season having played 15 games, his lowest total in his time at Richmond.

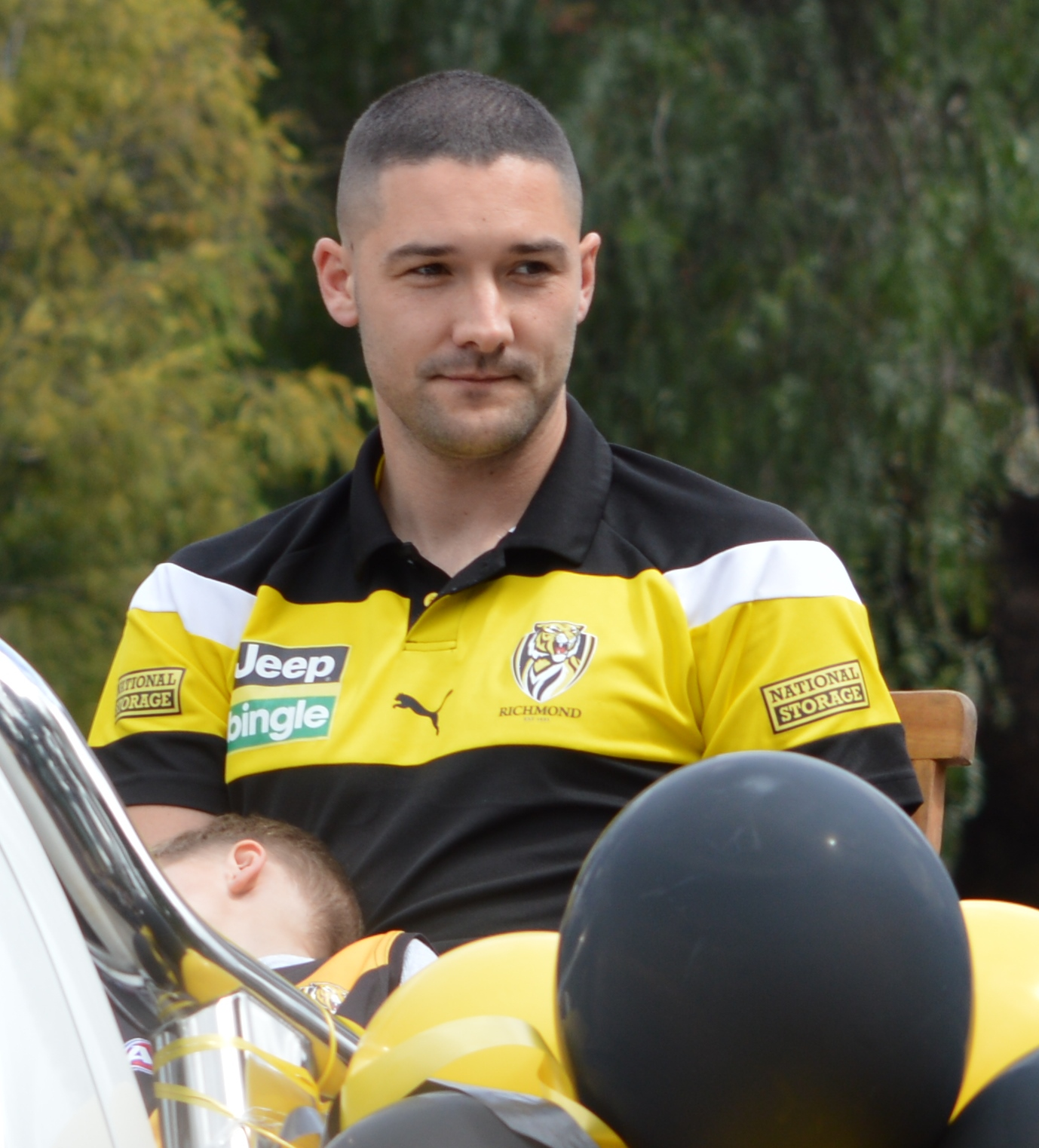
Grigg during the 2017 AFL Grand Final parade

In 2015 Grigg would return to form, playing in all possible matches for the third time in four seasons. As a contested-ball player, he led the club for tackles that year, with a career-best total of 98 across 23 matches. His performance in Round 15 was particularly praiseworthy, with Grigg picking up the second-most coaches votes of any Tiger for his 25 disposal and seven clearance effort. He played his 100th match for Richmond that year, in a Round 20 match against Gold Coast.

Grigg played parts of the 2016 season in a new role as an inside midfielder. In the 2016 pre-season Grigg suffered a fractured left thumb. He defied initial expectations to return to fitness for the club's Round 2 match against Collingwood, missing just one match in the process. Grigg recorded a career-high 38 disposals in Richmond's Round 11 loss to North Melbourne. He went on to play in a total of 20 matches that season. Grigg earned his second Kevin Bartlett Medal in 2016, after placing fourth at the club for disposals, tackles and clearances as well as second in inside 50 entries.

In 2017, Richmond coach Damien Hardwick labelled Grigg the smartest footballer at Richmond, noting his ability to 'read the game' a fraction faster than others. By that season he was the oldest player in Richmond's regular AFL team and the second oldest contracted player at the club behind only Ivan Maric.

Grigg suffered a hamstring strain in the lead-up to round 7, 2018 and missed that match as a result. He was considered a "touch and go" chance to play the following week but ultimately missed his second straight match. He made his return in round 9, called up as a late-replacement for first-year forward Jack Higgins.

On 14 May 2019, Grigg announced his immediate retirement from AFL football, having failed to play a match at any level that season due to persistent knee and hip injures. His decision to retire mid-season allowed Richmond a list spot to use at the 2019 mid-season rookie draft, which was used to recruit eventual 2019 premiership player Marlion Pickett.

He concluded his career having played 214 AFL matches.

== Coaching career ==
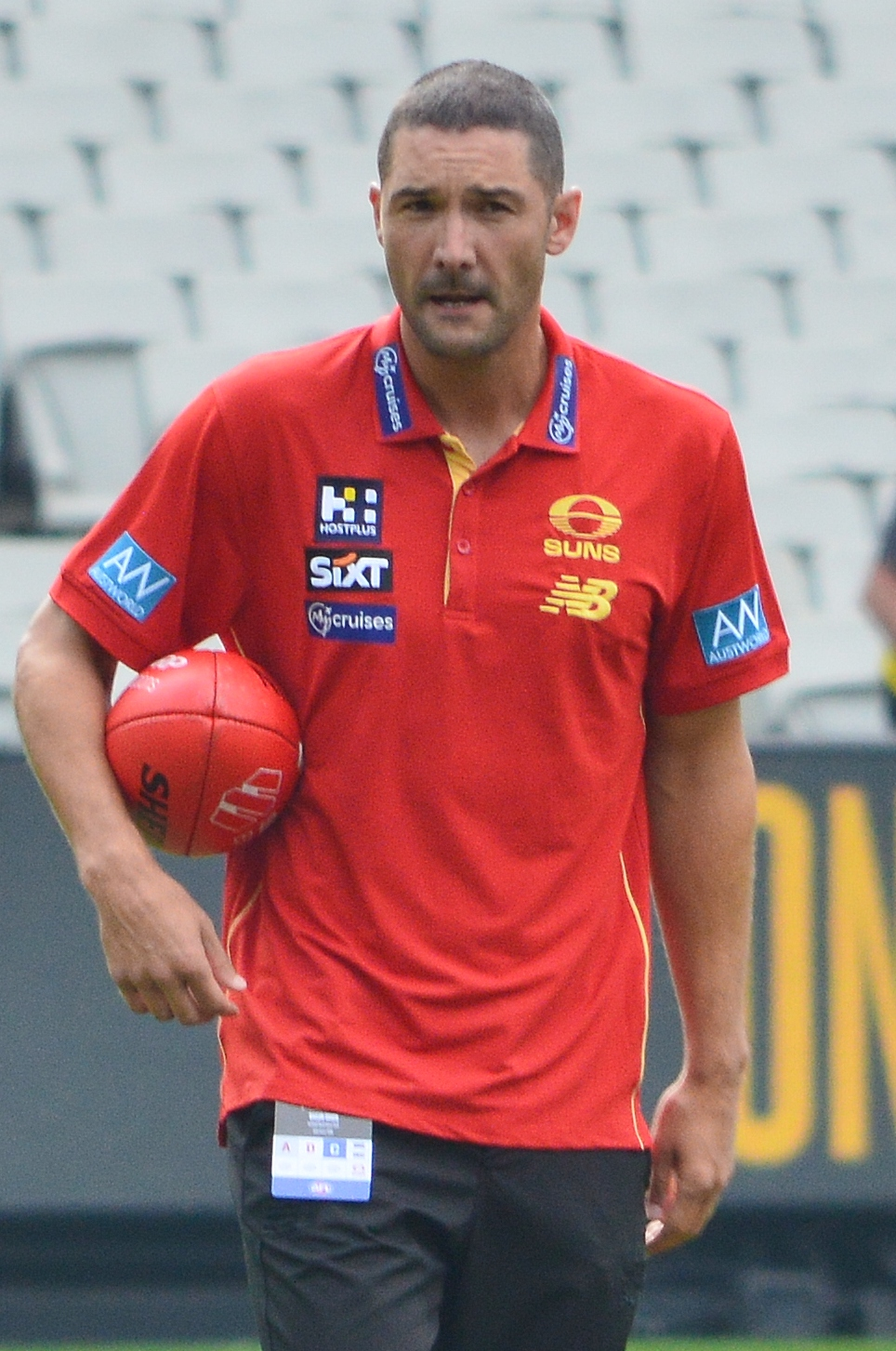
Grigg with Gold Coast in March 2026

In October 2019, Grigg joined the Geelong Football Club coaching panel as a development coach. Following four seasons with Geelong, Grigg departed the Cats to join his former coach Damien Hardwick in his new position at Gold Coast. He commenced his role as assistant and development coach in 2024.

== Statistics ==
Legend
G	Goals	K	Kicks	D	Disposals	T	Tackles
B	Behinds	H	Handballs	M	Marks
#	Played in that season's premiership team

Season	Team	No.	Games	Totals							Averages (per game)							Votes
Season	Team	No.	Games	G	B	K	H	D	M	T	G	B	K	H	D	M	T	Votes
2007	Carlton	16	5	0	1	28	31	59	17	3	0.0	0.2	5.6	6.2	11.8	3.4	0.6	0
2008	Carlton	16	20	4	5	164	150	314	81	42	0.2	0.3	8.2	7.5	15.7	4.1	2.1	0
2009	Carlton	16	10	3	5	94	102	196	32	29	0.3	0.5	9.4	10.2	19.6	3.2	2.9	0
2010	Carlton	16	8	3	2	82	90	172	42	25	0.4	0.3	10.3	11.3	21.5	5.3	3.1	0
2011	Richmond	6	21	6	10	271	190	461	107	57	0.3	0.5	12.9	9.0	22.0	5.1	2.7	1
2012	Richmond	6	22	18	10	322	239	561	133	44	0.8	0.5	14.6	10.9	25.5	6.0	2.0	11
2013	Richmond	6	23	15	10	281	204	485	139	74	0.7	0.4	12.2	8.9	21.1	6.0	3.2	5
2014	Richmond	6	15	3	6	151	156	307	64	36	0.2	0.4	10.1	10.4	20.5	4.3	2.4	0
2015	Richmond	6	23	16	10	259	229	488	105	98	0.7	0.4	11.3	10.0	21.2	4.6	4.3	0
2016	Richmond	6	20	10	7	257	229	486	106	72	0.5	0.4	12.9	11.5	24.3	5.3	3.6	1
2017^{#}	Richmond	6	25	15	13	322	255	577	131	94	0.6	0.5	12.9	10.2	23.1	5.2	3.8	7
2018	Richmond	6	22	3	5	238	217	455	97	64	0.1	0.2	10.8	9.9	20.7	4.4	2.9	2
2019	Richmond	6	0	—	—	—	—	—	—	—	—	—	—	—	—	—	—	—
Career			214	96	84	2469	2092	4561	1054	638	0.4	0.4	11.5	9.8	21.3	4.9	3.0	27

== Representative career ==
In 2011 Grigg was a member of the Australian squad for a two match International rules series against Ireland and played two matches.

== Honours and achievements ==
Team

- AFL premiership player (Richmond): 2017
- McClelland Trophy (Richmond): 2018

Individual

- 2× Kevin Bartlett Medal (5th RFC B&F): 2012, 2016
- AFL Rising Star nominee: 2008

Junior

- U-18 All-Australian: 2006

== Personal life ==
Grigg is married to wife Sarah. The couple had their first child, Sonny, in June 2014. They had a second son, Spencer Leigh, in December 2017.

He is a part-owner in multiple SpudBar franchise restaurants.
