= Andrew Collins (footballer, born 1988) =

Australian rules football player

Personal information
- Full name: Andrew Collins
- Born: 17 November 1988 (age 37); Bridgewater
- Original team: Sandhurst/Bendigo Pioneers
- Draft: 73rd overall, 2006; Richmond
- Height: 187 cm (6 ft 2 in)
- Weight: 83 kg (183 lb)
- Position: Midfield

Playing career^{1}
Years	Club	Games (Goals)
2007–2010	Richmond	25 (23)
2011–2013	Carlton	11 (6)
Total		36 (29)
- ^{1} Playing statistics correct to the end of 2013.

Andrew Collins (born 17 November 1988) is an Australian rules football player.

Collins was born in Bridgewater. He played junior football for Sandhurst in the Bendigo Football League, and played TAC Cup football for the Bendigo Pioneers. He was recruited to the AFL by the Richmond Football Club with its fifth round selection in the 2006 AFL draft (#73 overall).

Collins made his senior debut for the Tigers in Round 4 of the 2009 AFL season against Melbourne. Collins performed well, named amongst Richmond's best, including two goals and 20 disposals. He continued to performing well for the Tigers, being named in Richmond's best on ground several times and averaging 20 possessions per game. Collins was traded at the end of the 2010 season; in his four seasons at Richmond, he played 25 senior games.

Prior to the 2010 AFL Trade Week, Collins was linked with a move to Carlton. The trade was made official on 10 October 2010, with Collins traded to the Blues in exchange for Shaun Grigg. Collins made his Carlton debut in its Round 3 match against Collingwood, but played only one more senior game in his first season at the club, before a mid-season shoulder injury forced him out. He was delisted by Carlton at the end of 2012 but regained his spot on the list in the Pre-Season Draft. Although he stayed injury-free in 2013, and played throughout the VFL season with the Northern Blues, Collins was not able to press for senior selection again. In September of that year, he was delisted by Carlton for the second and final time.

Collins took on the role of playing coach for Bridgewater in the Loddon Valley Football League in 2014, leading the club to the premiership that year; he remains at Bridgewater as of 2015.

== Statistics ==
[6]

Legend
G	Goals	K	Kicks	D	Disposals	T	Tackles
B	Behinds	H	Handballs	M	Marks

Season	Team	No.	Games	Totals							Averages (per game)							Votes
Season	Team	No.	Games	G	B	K	H	D	M	T	G	B	K	H	D	M	T	Votes
2007	Richmond	42	0	–	–	–	–	–	–	–	–	–	–	–	–	–	–	—N/a
2008	Richmond	42	0	–	–	–	–	–	–	–	–	–	–	–	–	–	–	—N/a
2009	Richmond	42	10	8	2	82	109	191	44	29	0.8	0.2	8.2	10.9	19.1	4.4	2.9	0
2010	Richmond	24	15	15	8	116	107	223	51	56	1.0	0.5	7.7	7.1	14.9	3.4	3.7	0
2011	Carlton	16	2	0	3	11	7	18	11	5	0.0	1.5	5.5	3.5	9.0	5.5	2.5	0
2012	Carlton	16	9	6	6	88	57	145	30	30	0.7	0.7	9.8	6.3	16.1	3.3	3.3	2
2013	Carlton	16	0	–	–	–	–	–	–	–	–	–	–	–	–	–	–	—N/a
Career			36	29	19	297	280	577	136	120	0.8	0.5	8.3	7.8	16.0	3.8	3.3	2
