= David Gourdis =

Australian rules footballer

Personal information
- Full name: David Gourdis
- Born: 14 March 1989 (age 37)
- Original team: Subiaco (WAFL)
- Draft: 1st overall, 2007 PSD; Richmond
- Height: 193 cm (6 ft 4 in)
- Weight: 93 kg (205 lb)
- Position: Full Back/Full Forward

Playing career^{1}
Years	Club	Games (Goals)
2010–2011	Richmond	4 (0)
- ^{1} Playing statistics correct to the end of 2011.

David Gourdis (born 14 March 1989) is a former Australian rules football player for the Richmond Football Club.

Originally from Carine, Western Australia, Gourdis played junior football for Western Australian Football League club Subiaco, but was overlooked at the 2007 AFL draft, despite ranking no.1 in the 20m sprint (2.3 sec), and no.1 in the running vertical jump (101 cm), at the AFL Draft Camp in Canberra. However, in December 2007, Richmond selected Gourdis with their number 1 pick in the 2007 Pre-Season Draft.

Unable to break into Richmond's senior team, Gourdis was delisted at the end of the 2008 AFL season before being re-drafted by Richmond at the 2008 AFL Rookie draft.

Gourdis made his AFL debut on 14 August 2010, in Round 20 of the 2010 AFL season, against Carlton at the Melbourne Cricket Ground (MCG) and after playing four senior games for Richmond across 2010 and 2011, Gourdis was delisted by Richmond on 30 November 2011.
