= 2011 Melbourne Football Club season =

Melbourne Football Club
2011 season
- President: Jim Stynes^{(4th season)}
- Coach: Dean Bailey^{(4th season)}^{(rounds 1–19)} Todd Viney^{(rounds 19–24)}
- Captains: Brad Green^{(1st season)}
- Home grounds: MCG^{(100,018 capacity)}
- Pre-season: Quarter-finals
- AFL season: 13th
- Finals series: DNQ
- Best and fairest: Brent Moloney
- Leading goalkicker: Liam Jurrah^{(40 goals)}
- Highest home attendance: 75,998^{(round 12 vs. Collingwood)}
- Lowest home attendance: 7,255^{(round 17 vs. Port Adelaide)}
- Average home attendance: 31,043
- Club membership: 36,937^{(▲3,579 / ▲10.73%)}

The 2011 Melbourne Football Club season was the club's 112th year in the VFL/AFL since it began in 1897.

In January, the club announced Brad Green as captain, taking over the reins from the recently retired James McDonald. Aaron Davey, Brent Moloney and Jared Rivers were named vice captains while youngsters Nathan Jones and Jack Grimes were promoted to the leadership group. Dean Bailey was re-appointed coach, but was sacked after a near-record 186-point loss to Geelong in Round 19.

== 2011 list changes ==
=== 2010 trades ===
Trade gained	Traded from	Trade lost	Ref
Pick 52	Hawthorn	Kyle Cheney; Pick 66	

=== Retirements and delistings ===
Player	New club	League	Reason
Brad Miller	Richmond Tigers	AFL	Delisted
Paul Johnson	Hawthorn	AFL	Delisted
Daniel Bell	Unknown	Unknown	Delisted
John Meesen	Unknown	Unknown	Delisted
Rhys Healey	Unknown	Unknown	Delisted
Daniel Hughes	WAFL	Subiaco Lions	Delisted

=== National draft ===
Round	Overall pick	Player	State	Position	Team from	League from
1	12	Lucas Cook	(Victoria (state))	Forward	North Ballarat Rebels	TAC Cup
2	33	Jeremy Howe	(Tasmania)	Forward	Hobart Football Club	TFL
3	50	Troy Davis	(Victoria (state))	Backmen	Geelong Falcons	TAC Cup
3	53	Tom McDonald	(Victoria (state))	Key Position	North Ballarat Rebels	TAC Cup
5	81 (RP)	Jordie McKenzie	(Victoria (state))	Utility	Melbourne Demons	AFL
6	96 (RP)	Jake Spencer	(Queensland)	Ruck	Melbourne Demons	AFL

=== Rookie draft ===
Round	Overall pick	Player	State	Position	Team from	League from
1	14	Daniel Nicholson	(Victoria (state))	Utility	University Blues	VAFA
2	31	Michael Evans	(Western Australia)	Utility	Claremont Tigers	WAFL
3	38	Kelvin Lawrence	(Western Australia)	Forward	Peel Thunder	WAFL
4	63	Cameron Johnston	(Victoria (state))	Midfield	Geelong Falcons	TAC Cup
5	75	Robert Campbell	(Victoria (state))	Ruck	Box Hill Hawks	VFL
6	83	Tom McNamara	(South Australia)	Defender	Melbourne Demons	AFL

== 2011 squad ==
Melbourne Football Club
Senior list		Rookie list	Coaching staff
1 Matthew Warnock; 2 Nathan Jones; 3 Clint Bartram; 4 Jack Watts; 5 Jordan Gysberts; 6 Matthew Bate; 7 Jamie Bennell; 8 James Frawley; 9 Jack Trengove; 10 Cale Morton; 12 Colin Sylvia; 13 Jordie McKenzie; 14 Lynden Dunn; 15 Ricky Petterd; 16 Jack Grimes; 18 Brad Green (c); 19 Addam Maric; 20 Colin Garland; 21 Lucas Cook; 22 Brent Moloney (vc)	24 Liam Jurrah; 27 Jared Rivers (vc); 28 Joel Macdonald; 31 Tom Scully; 33 Austin Wonaeamirri; 34 Stefan Martin; 35 Luke Tapscott; 36 Aaron Davey (vc); 37 Max Gawn; 38 Jeremy Howe; 39 Neville Jetta; 40 Mark Jamar; 41 Troy Davis; 42 Jake Spencer; 43 Tom McDonald; 44 Rohan Bail; 46 Sam Blease; 47 James Strauss; 48 Jack Fitzpatrick	26 Robert Campbell; 29 Michael Newton; 30 Tom McNamara; 45 Kelvin Lawrence; 49 Daniel Nicholson; 50 Michael Evans; 52 Cameron Johnston	Head coach: Dean Bailey (until round 19); Todd Viney (caretaker from round 20); Assistant coaches: Josh Mahoney (forward line); Scott West (midfield); Brian Royal (backline); Mark Williams; Kelly O'Donnell (development); David Dunbar (innovations); Legend: (c) Captain(s); (vc) Vice-captain(s); Long-term injury list; Upgraded rookie(s); Updated: 1 August 2011; Source(s): Senior list, Rookie list, Coaching staff

== 2011 season ==
=== Pre-season ===
==== NAB Cup ====
===== Week 1 =====
	Round 1
Friday, 11 February (7:15 pm)	Adelaide 0.3.6 (24)	def. by	Melbourne 0.5.4 (34)	Football Park	Report
Friday, 11 February (8:20 pm)	Melbourne 0.5.6 (36)	def.	Port Adelaide 1.2.6 (27)	Football Park	Report

===== Quarter-final =====
Quarter-final
Thursday, 24 February (7:10 pm)	Melbourne	def. by	Essendon	Etihad Stadium (crowd: 13,863)	Report
1.3.1 (28); 1.6.3 (48); 1.10.5 (74); 1.11.7 (82)	Q1; Q2; Q3; Final	0.7.3 (45); 1.8.5 (62); 1.10.5 (74); 1.17.10 (121)	Umpires: Rosebury, Nicholls, Ritchie
Maric	Super Goals	Hurley
Jurrah 3, Dunn 2, Maric 2, Trengove, Watts, Jetta, Sylvia	Goals	Ryder, Davey 2, Monfries 2, Heppell 2, Crameri, Jetta, Howlett, Williams, Winderlich, Stanton, Bellchambers, Colyer
Grimes, Jurrah, Moloney, Sylvia, Maric, Trengove	Best	Heppell, Hooker, Hurley, Stanton, Ryder, Monfries
Nil	Injuries	Colyer (hip), Dempsey (concussion)

==== NAB Challenge ====
===== Week 3 =====
Week 3
Saturday, 5 March (12:00 noon)	Melbourne	def. by	Brisbane Lions	Princes Park (crowd: 3,000 est.)	Report
4.2 (26); 6.4 (40); 9.5 (59); 12.6 (78)	Q1; Q2; Q3; Final	3.4 (22); 7.8 (50); 13.9 (87); 16.11 (107)	Umpires: Findlay, Ryan, Fila
Maric 3, Watts 2, Martin, Jetta, Dunn, Sylvia, Petterd, Jamar, Bate	Goals	Power 3, Clark 2, Bewick 2, O'Brien 2, Rockliff 2, Polkinghorne 2, Beams 2, Lester
Jetta, Sylvia, Jones, Bail, Maric, Tapscott, Jamar	Best	Rich, Clark, Adcock, Power, Rockliff, Collier, Lester

===== Week 4 =====
Week 4
Friday, 11 March (7:00 pm)	Hawthorn	def.	Melbourne	York Park (crowd: 4010)	Report
2.3 (15); 5.5 (35); 11.9 (75); 15.12 (102)	Q1; Q2; Q3; Final	5.1 (31); 8.1 (49); 9.2 (56); 12.3 (75)
Shiels 3, Whitecross 2, Smith, Birchall, Guerra, Bruce, Savage, Burgoyne, Lisle, Young, Hale, Sewell	Goals	Maric 3, Jurrah 2, Jamar, Green, Moloney, Scully, Davey, Petterd, Bate
Shiels, Sewell, Birchall, Guerra	Best	Maric, Davey, Grimes, Scully

=== Home and away season ===
==== Round 1 ====
Round 1
Sunday, 27 March (2:10 pm)	Melbourne	drew with	Sydney	MCG (crowd: 33,951)	Report
3.2 (20); 5.8 (38); 8.12 (60); 11.18 (84)	Q1; Q2; Q3; Final	5.3 (33); 7.5 (47); 10.14 (74); 11.18 (84)	Umpires: McBurney, Armstrong, Jeffery; Television broadcast: Seven Network
Green 2, Dunn 2, Jurrah 2, Sylvia, Jetta, Moloney, Jones, Bennell	Goals	McGlynn 3, Bolton 3, Goodes 2, Reid, Everitt, White
Sylvia, Garland, Moloney, Trengove, Tapscott, Green, Dunn	Best	Richards, Jack, Bolton, McGlynn, O'Keefe, McVeigh, Grundy
Davey for head high contact with McGlynn	Reports	Nil
Debut(s): Luke Tapscott; Brownlow Votes: Ryan O'Keefe (Sydney) 3 votes, Brent Moloney (Melbourne) 2 votes, Ben McGlynn (Sydney) 1 vote Record: 0 Wins, 0 Losses, 1 Draw (100.00%); Ladder Position: 8th Substitutes: Ricky Petterd ▲ Addam Maric ▼

==== Round 2 ====
Round 2
Sunday, 3 April (4:40 pm)	Hawthorn	def.	Melbourne	MCG (crowd: 49,905)	Report
2.8 (20); 3.13 (31); 11.24 (90); 16.26 (122)	Q1; Q2; Q3; Final	3.1 (19); 8.2 (50); 9.3 (57); 12.5 (77)	Umpires: Donlon, Stewart, Chamberlain; Television broadcast: Foxtel
Burgoyne 4, Roughead 2, Franklin 2, Suckling 2, Bateman, Bruce, Rioli, Ladson, Shiels, Osborne	Goals	Dunn 2, Green 2, Jurrah 2, Jamar, Trengove, Bennell, Petterd, Davey, Watts
Rioli, Suckling, Burgoyne, Shiels, Young, Gilham	Best	Tapscott, Sylvia, Jamar, Grimes, Bail, Garland
Rioli (laceration to calf), Renouf (concussion)	Injuries	Garland (knee)
Brownlow Votes: Cyril Rioli (Hawthorn) 3 votes, Matt Suckling (Hawthorn) 2 votes, Sam Mitchell (Hawthorn) 1 vote Record: 0 Wins, 1 Loss, 1 Draw (78.2%); Ladder Position: 13th Substitutes: Addam Maric ▲ Neville Jetta ▼

==== Round 3 ====
Round 3
Sunday, 10 April (1:10 pm)	Melbourne	def.	Brisbane Lions	MCG (crowd: 24,380)	Report
1.1 (7); 6.3 (39); 11.7 (73); 12.10 (82)	Q1; Q2; Q3; Final	5.2 (32); 7.3 (45); 9.3 (57); 11.5 (71)	Umpires: Schmitt, Chamberlain, Keating; Television broadcast: Foxtel
Jurrah 5, Wonaeamirri, Gysberts, Grimes, Sylvia, Bennell, Dunn, Moloney	Goals	Power 4, Banfield 2, Polkinghorne, Leuenberger, Redden, Clark, Rockliff
Jamar, Jurrah, Moloney, Gysberts, Sylvia, Jones, Frawley	Best	Clark, Power, Adcock, Banfield, Black, Raines, Polec
Nil	Injuries	Clark (dislocated finger)
Milestones: Rohan Bail (1st AFL Goal); Brownlow Votes: Brent Moloney (Melbourne) 3 votes, Liam Jurrah (Melbourne) 2 votes, Luke Power (Brisbane Lions) 1 vote Record: 1 Win, 1 Loss, 1 Draw (87.7%); Ladder Position: 10th Substitutes: Cale Morton ▲ Jack Watts ▼

==== Round 4 ====
Round 4
Sunday, 17 April (2:40 pm)	Gold Coast	def. by	Melbourne	Gabba (crowd: 12,111)	Report
3.2 (20); 4.5 (29); 8.11 (53); 9.15 (69)	Q1; Q2; Q3; Final	6.2 (38); 11.9 (75); 15.14 (104); 23.21 (159)	Umpires: Meredith, Ryan, Keating; Television broadcast: Seven Network
Smith 2, Swallow 2, Stanley, Fraser, Matera, Shaw, Magin	Goals	Jurrah 3, Morton 3, Davey 2, Trengove 2, Dunn 2, Green 2, Jamar 2, Wonaeamirri 2, Moloney, Sylvia, Bail, Jones, Bennell
Swallow, Rischitelli, Brennan, McKenzie, Smith	Best	Moloney, Trengove, Davey, Grimes, Jamar, Jurrah
Brownlow Votes: Colin Sylvia (Melbourne) 3 votes, Mark Jamar (Melbourne) 2 votes, Brent Moloney (Melbourne) 1 vote Record: 2 Wins, 1 Loss, 1 Draw (116.2%); Ladder Position: 7th Substitutes: Jack Watts ▲ Liam Jurrah ▼

==== Round 5 ====
Round 5
Bye; Melbourne

==== Round 6 ====
Round 6
Thursday, 28 April (6:40 pm)	West Coast	def.	Melbourne	Subiaco Oval (crowd: 36,298)	Report
5.3 (33); 7.8 (50); 10.12 (72); 15.16 (106)	Q1; Q2; Q3; Final	0.2 (2); 3.6 (24); 4.8 (32); 6.16 (52)	Umpires: Donlon, Rosebury, Stewart; Television broadcast: Ten Network
Darling 3, Lynch 3, Embley 3, Kennedy 2, Nicoski 2, LeCras, Rosa	Goals	Jones, Sylvia, Davey, Moloney, Watts, Dunn
Priddis, Kerr, Cox, Ebert, S. Selwood, A. Selwood, Nicoski	Best	Garland, Jamar, Grimes, Jones, Watts
Priddis (dislocated finger)	Injuries	Nil
Milestones: Mark Jamar (100th AFL Game); Brownlow Votes: Dean Cox (West Coast) 3 votes, Matt Priddis (West Coast) 2 votes, Jack Darling (West Coast) 1 vote Record: 2 Wins, 2 Losses, 1 Draw (100.4%); Ladder Position: 8th Substitutes: Lynden Dunn ▲ Jordan Gysberts ▼

==== Round 7 ====
Round 7
Sunday, 8 May (2:10 pm)	Melbourne	def.	Adelaide	MCG (crowd: 19,987)	Report
2.7 (19); 6.11 (47); 14.16 (100); 22.17 (149)	Q1; Q2; Q3; Final	2.0 (12); 5.3 (33); 6.4 (40); 8.5 (53)	Umpires: Stevic, Jeffery, Keating; Television broadcast: Seven Network
Petterd 4, Sylvia 4, Jurrah 3, Watts 2, Wonaeamirri 2, Green 2, Dunn, Tapscott, Bartram, Bate, Jones	Goals	Tippett 3, Reilly 2, S. Thompson, van Berlo, McKernan
Moloney, Jones, Sylvia, Davey, Green, Maric, Trengove, Frawley	Best	Jaensch, Reilly, van Berlo, Johncock, Schmidt
Grimes (ankle)	Injuries	Dangerfield (concussion), S. Thompson (calf), Wright (knee)
Milestones: Luke Tapscott (1st AFL Goal); Brownlow Votes: Brent Moloney (Melbourne) 3 votes, Colin Sylvia (Melbourne) 2 votes, Mark Jamar (Melbourne) 1 vote Record: 3 Wins, 2 Losses, 1 Draw (119.4%); Ladder Position: 7th Substitutes: Austin Wonaeamirri ▲ Jack Grimes ▼

==== Round 8 ====
Round 8
Saturday, 14 May (2:10 pm)	North Melbourne	def.	Melbourne	Etihad Stadium (crowd: 23,536)	Report
3.2 (20); 7.5 (47); 14.7 (91); 19.10 (124)	Q1; Q2; Q3; Final	7.2 (44); 8.6 (54); 10.10 (70); 12.11 (83)	Umpires: Donlon, Bowen, Wenn; Television broadcast: Ten Network
Edwards 6, Wells 3, Harvey 3, Hansen 2, Goldstein 2, Adams, Speight, Harper	Goals	Jurrah 3, Maric 3, Newton 2, Petterd 2, Watts, Bartram
Wells, Edwards, Swallow, Goldstein, Garlett	Best	Davey, Warnock, Martin, Frawley, Watts
Cunnington (illness) replaced before the game by Garlett	Injuries	Garland (ankle), Bail (knee), Martin (knee)
Brownlow Votes: Todd Goldstein (North Melbourne) 3 votes, Andrew Swallow (North Melbourne) 2 votes, Aaron Edwards (North Melbourne) 1 vote Record: 3 Wins, 3 Losses, 1 Draw (109.1%); Ladder Position: 9th Substitutes: Jamie Bennell ▲ Rohan Bail ▼

==== Round 9 ====
Round 9
Saturday, 21 May (2:10 pm)	St Kilda	def.	Melbourne	Etihad Stadium (crowd: 28,863)	Report
5.4 (34); 9.5 (59); 12.6 (78); 16.10 (106)	Q1; Q2; Q3; Final	5.1 (31); 7.5 (47); 10.7 (67); 13.8 (86)	Umpires: Stevic, Dalgleish, Pannell; Television broadcast: Ten Network
Milne 3, Riewoldt 3, Montagna 2, Cripps 2, Ray, Jones, Siposs, Schneider, Polo, Peake	Goals	Jurrah 3, Green 2, Watts 2, Maric 2, Newton 2, Petterd, Gysberts
Montagna, Jones, Armitage, Milne, Riewoldt, Gilbert, Peake	Best	Jones, Moloney, Evans, Maric, Watts, Gysberts
Nil	Injuries	Tapscott (hamstring)
Debut(s): Michael Evans; Milestones: Nathan Jones (100th AFL Game); Brownlow Votes: Brendon Goddard (St Kilda) 3 votes, Leigh Montagna (St Kilda) 2 votes, Sam Gilbert (St Kilda) 1 vote Record: 3 Wins, 4 Losses, 1 Draw (105%); Ladder Position: 10th Substitutes: Matthew Bate ▲ Luke Tapscott ▼

==== Round 10 ====
Round 10
Friday, 27 May (7:40 pm)	Melbourne	def. by	Carlton	MCG (crowd: 47,464)	Report
1.2 (8); 3.4 (22); 4.7 (31); 6.10 (46)	Q1; Q2; Q3; Final	3.4 (22); 5.8 (38); 8.12 (60); 13.15 (93)	Umpires: McBurney, Nicholls, Armstrong; Television broadcast: Seven Network
Sylvia, Petterd, Jurrah, Rivers, Newton	Goals	O'hAilpin 3, Walker 2, Betts 2, Waite 2, Murphy, Yarran, Armfield, Garlett
Frawley, Rivers, Green, Macdonald, Jones	Best	Judd, Murphy, Gibbs, Robinson, Jamison, Simpson
Nil	Injuries	Russell (hamstring), Laidler (knee)
Debut(s): Daniel Nicholson; Milestones: Joel Macdonald (100th AFL Game); Brownlow Votes: Mitch Robinson (Carlton) 3 votes, Chris Judd (Carlton) 2 votes, Marc Murphy (Carlton) 1 vote Record: 3 Wins, 5 Losses, 1 Draw (98.8%); Ladder Position: 10th Substitutes: Daniel Nicholson ▲ Matthew Warnock ▼

==== Round 11 ====
Round 11
Friday, 3 June (7:40 pm)	Essendon	def. by	Melbourne	MCG (crowd: 53,077)	Report
3.2 (20); 6.5 (41); 6.6 (42); 10.8 (68)	Q1; Q2; Q3; Final	3.0 (18); 5.4 (34); 11.6 (72); 15.11 (101)	Umpires: Donlon, Rosebury, Mollison; Television broadcast: Seven Network
Ryder 2, Melksham, Stanton, Hardingham, Howlett, Hille, Monfries, Zaharakis	Goals	Green 4, Jurrah 3, Jetta 2, Moloney 2, Sylvia, Watts, Scully, Howe
Melksham, Lonergan, Heppell, Hibberd	Best	McKenzie, Jones, Scully, Martin, Green, Gysberts
Nil	Injuries	Sylvia (corked right quad)
Debut(s): Jeremy Howe, Max Gawn; Milestones: Jeremy Howe (1st AFL Goal); Brownlow Votes: Jordie McKenzie (Melbourne) 3 votes, Jordan Gysberts (Melbourne) 2 votes, Jack Trengove (Melbourne) 1 vote Record: 4 Wins, 5 Losses, 1 Draw (102.6%); Ladder Position: 9th Substitutes: Daniel Nicholson ▲ Colin Sylvia ▼

==== Round 12 ====
Round 12
Monday, 13 June (2:10 pm)	Melbourne	def. by	Collingwood	MCG (crowd: 75,998)	Report
2.2 (14); 3.5 (23); 5.5 (35); 6.5 (41)	Q1; Q2; Q3; Final	3.6 (24); 9.7 (61); 11.10 (76); 19.14 (129)	Umpires: Nicholls, Chamberlain, Mollison; Television broadcast: Ten Network
Sylvia 4, Howe, Jurrah	Goals	Cloke 6, Krakouer 2, Pendlebury 2, Ball 2, McCarthy, Fasolo, Wellingham, Brown, Dawes, Didak, Blair
Sylvia, Frawley, Watts, Scully, Moloney	Best	Wellingham, Cloke, Reid, Sidebottom, Ball
Bartram (eye), Jetta (broken hand)	Injuries	Nil
Brownlow Votes: Sharrod Wellingham (Collingwood) 3 votes, Travis Cloke (Collingwood) 2 votes, Chris Tarrant (Collingwood) 1 vote Record: 4 Wins, 6 Losses, 1 Draw (93.7%); Ladder Position: 10th Substitutes: Michael Evans ▲ Neville Jetta ▼

==== Round 13 ====
Round 13
Sunday, 19 June (1:10 pm)	Melbourne	def.	Fremantle	MCG (crowd: 19,092)	Report
6.5 (41); 10.7 (67); 14.12 (96); 22.17 (149)	Q1; Q2; Q3; Final	1.4 (10); 6.6 (42); 7.10 (52); 8.12 (60)	Umpires: Kennedy, Leppard, Wenn; Television broadcast: Foxtel
Green 5, Martin 3, Watts 3, Howe 2, Jurrah 2, Frawley, Gawn, Nicholson, Petterd, Sylvia, Trengove, Jones	Goals	Johnson 3, Mayne 2, Pavlich, Pearce, McPharlin
Martin, Green, McKenzie, Watts, Scully, Howe	Best	Fyfe, Barlow, Mzungu, Johnson, McPharlin
Gysberts (soreness) replaced in selected side by Nicholson, Garland (ankle)	Injuries	Bradley (knee) replaced in selected side by van Berlo, Grover (adductor tear), Crowley (back)
Petterd for striking Crowley	Reports	Nil
Milestone: Max Gawn (1st AFL Goal), Daniel Nicholson (1st AFL Goal); Brownlow Votes: Jordie McKenzie (Melbourne) 3 votes, Tom Scully (Melbourne) 2 votes, Brad Green (Melbourne) 1 vote Record: 5 Wins, 6 Losses, 1 Draw (102.2%); Ladder Position: 9th Substitutes: Jamie Bennell ▲ Colin Garland ▼

==== Round 14 ====
Round 14
Saturday, 25 June (2:10 pm)	Richmond	def. by	Melbourne	MCG (crowd: 61,900)	Report
3.5 (23); 7.5 (47); 10.9 (69); 13.13 (91)	Q1; Q2; Q3; Final	7.1 (43); 12.4 (76); 14.14 (98); 17.16 (118)	Umpires: Margetts, Stevic, Findlay; Television broadcast: Foxtel
Vickery 3, Farmer 2, Newman 2, Deledio, Edwards, Foley, Grigg, Riewoldt, Martin	Goals	Watts 3, Green 3, Trengove 3, Jones 2, Martin 2, Jurrah 2, Howe, Sylvia
Foley, Deledio, Newman, Nahas, Edwards, Houli, Vickery	Best	Moloney, Watts, Jones, Frawley, Scully, Green, Petterd, Jamar
Conca (head knock)	Injuries	Macdonald (knee)
Brownlow Votes: Brent Moloney (Melbourne) 3 votes, James Frawley (Melbourne) 2 votes, Jack Watts (Melbourne) 1 vote Record: 6 Wins, 6 Losses, 1 Draw (104.3%); Ladder Position: 8th Substitutes: Cale Morton ▲ Joel Macdonald ▼

==== Round 15 ====
Round 15
Friday, 1 July (7:40 pm)	Western Bulldogs	def.	Melbourne	Etihad Stadium (crowd: 29,516)	Report
4.5 (29); 8.9 (57); 13.10 (88); 19.13 (127)	Q1; Q2; Q3; Final	2.4 (16); 4.9 (33); 7.13 (55); 8.15 (63)	Umpires: Farmer, Rosebury, Mollison; Television broadcast: Seven Network
Giansiracusa 4, Hall 3, Griffen 2, Higgins 2, Dahlhaus 2, Ward 2, Gilbee, Cooney, Picken, Grant	Goals	Petterd 2, Howe 2, Watts 2, Trengove, Sylvia
Griffen, Cooney, Ward, Giansiracusa, Picken	Best	Trengove, Petterd, Howe, Moloney
Debut(s): Sam Blease; Milestones: Colin Garland (50th AFL Game); Brownlow Votes: Daniel Giansiracusa (Western Bulldogs) 3 votes, Ryan Griffen (Western Bulldogs) 2 votes, Callan Ward (Western Bulldogs) 1 vote Record: 6 Wins, 7 Losses, 1 Draw (99%); Ladder Position: 9th Substitutes: Sam Blease ▲ Jamie Bennell ▼

==== Round 16 ====
Round 16
Bye; Melbourne

==== Round 17 ====
Round 17
Saturday, 16 July (8:10 pm)	Melbourne	def.	Port Adelaide	TIO Stadium (crowd: 7, 255)	Report
6.2 (38); 9.6 (60); 16.8 (104); 17.11 (113)	Q1; Q2; Q3; Final	2.2 (14); 6.4 (40); 10.5 (65); 14.8 (92)	Umpires: Dalgleish, Armstrong, Jeffery; Television broadcast: Ten Network
Jurrah 3, Maric 3, Petterd 3, Green 2, Martin 2, Gysberts, Jones, Nicholson, Sylvia	Goals	Banner 3, C. Cornes 3, Gray 2, Hitchcock 2, Cassisi, Hartlett, Pearce, Thomas
Petterd, Martin, Sylvia, Moloney, Frawley, Trengove, Maric, Jurrah	Best	C. Cornes, Thomas, Banner, Cassisi, O'Shea, Pearce, K. Cornes, Hartlett, Jacobs
Scully (knee)	Injuries	Thomas (eye)
Brownlow Votes: Brent Moloney (Melbourne) 3 votes, Colin Sylvia (Melbourne) 2 votes, Ricky Petterd (Melbourne) 1 vote Record: 7 Wins, 7 Losses, 1 Draw (100.6%); Ladder Position: 9th Substitutes: Jeremy Howe ▲ Tom Scully ▼

==== Round 18 ====
Round 18
Sunday, 24 July (2:10 pm)	Melbourne	def. by	Hawthorn	MCG (crowd: 39,782)	Report
3.3 (21); 6.3 (39); 9.4 (58); 12.6 (78)	Q1; Q2; Q3; Final	6.1 (37); 10.4 (64); 16.6 (102); 20.12 (132)	Umpires: Meredith, Kamolins, McBurney; Television broadcast: Seven Network
Green 4, Howe 3, Dunn 2, Sylvia, Bate, Petterd	Goals	Franklin 5, Breust 3, Rioli 3, Hodge 2, Osborne 2, Mitchell, Lewis, Ellis, Hale, Smith
Green, Martin, Howe, Dunn, Jones	Best	Sewell, Franklin, Mitchell, Hodge, Rioli, Bailey, Birchall
Nil	Injuries	Savage (shoulder)
Brownlow Votes: Brad Sewell (Hawthorn) 3 votes, Luke Hodge (Hawthorn) 2 votes, Sam Mitchell (Hawthorn) 1 vote Record: 7 Wins, 8 Losses, 1 Draw (97%); Ladder Position: 11th Substitutes: Jamie Bennell ▲ Addam Maric ▼

==== Round 19 ====
Round 19
Saturday, 30 July (2:10 pm)	Geelong	def.	Melbourne	Kardinia Park (crowd: 22,716)	Report
8.3 (51); 20.4 (124); 28.8 (176); 37.11 (233)	Q1; Q2; Q3; Final	0.3 (3); 1.4 (10); 5.4 (34); 7.5 (47)	Umpires: H. Ryan, S. Ryan, Jeffery; Television broadcast: Foxtel
Johnson 7, Hawkins 5, Mooney 5, Stokes 3, Varcoe 3, Duncan 3, Bartel 2, Corey 2, West 2, Mackie, Ottens, Ling, Christensen, Selwood	Goals	Dunn 2, Bate, Howe, Trengove, Watts, Jurrah
Johnson, Corey, Selwood, Enright, Mooney, Varcoe	Best	Dunn, McKenzie
Brownlow Votes: Joel Selwood (Geelong) 3 votes, Steve Johnson (Geelong) 2 votes, Corey Enright (Geelong) 1 vote Record: 7 Wins, 9 Losses, 1 Draw (86.8%); Ladder Position: 11th Substitutes: Matthew Bate ▲ Brent Moloney ▼

==== Round 20 ====
Round 20
Saturday, 6 August (2:10 pm)	Carlton	def.	Melbourne	MCG (crowd: 42,342)	Report
6.1 (37); 14.2 (86); 18.7 (115); 21.8 (134)	Q1; Q2; Q3; Final	3.7 (25); 3.10 (28); 6.12 (48); 7.16 (58)	Umpires: Donlon, Vozzo, Jeffery; Television broadcast: Ten Network
Ellard 3, Judd 2, Scotland 2, Walker 2, Garlett 2, Gibbs 2, Robinson, Kreuzer, McLean, Thornton, Betts, Joseph, Warnock, Henderson	Goals	Watts 2, Dunn 2, Green, Howe, Davey
Judd, Gibbs, Scotland, Warnock, Ellard, Murphy	Best	Watts, Garland, Rivers, Macdonald, Dunn
Armfield (ankle) replaced in the selected side by Houlihan	Injuries	Strauss (leg), Tapscott (concussion)
Brownlow Votes: Chris Judd (Carlton) 3 votes, Bryce Gibbs (Carlton) 2 votes, Marc Murphy (Carlton) 1 vote Record: 7 Wins, 10 Losses, 1 Draw (83.7%); Ladder Position: 11th Substitutes: Matthew Bate ▲ James Strauss ▼

==== Round 21 ====
Round 21
Sunday, 14 August (1:10 pm)	Melbourne	def. by	West Coast	Etihad Stadium (crowd: 15,709)	Report
1.2 (8); 3.4 (22); 8.7 (55); 9.8 (62)	Q1; Q2; Q3; Final	3.2 (20); 10.9 (69); 13.9 (87); 16.14 (110)	Umpires: McBurney, Kamolins, B. Ryan; Television broadcast: Foxtel
Howe 3, Petterd, Dunn, Watts, Sylvia, Trengove, Morton	Goals	Nicoski 3, LeCras 3, Kennedy 2, Cox 2, Kerr, S. Selwood, Naitanui, A. Selwood, Priddis, Embley
Howe, Frawley, Macdonald, Jones, Blease, Garland	Best	Gaff, Priddis, Embley, Shuey, Schofield, Cox, Brown
Green (general soreness) replaced in selected side by Nicholson	Injuries	Shuey (hamstring)
Brownlow Votes: Andrew Gaff (West Coast) 3 votes, Andrew Embley (West Coast) 2 votes, Jeremy Howe (Melbourne) 1 vote Record: 7 Wins, 11 Losses, 1 Draw (82.2%); Ladder Position: 11th Substitutes: Daniel Nicholson ▲ Luke Tapscott ▼

==== Round 22 ====
Round 22
Sunday, 21 August (4:40 pm)	Melbourne	def. by	Richmond	MCG (crowd: 36,321)	Report
4.0 (24); 7.1 (43); 14.2 (86); 17.8 (110)	Q1; Q2; Q3; Final	6.2 (38); 10.9 (69); 11.12 (78); 17.15 (117)	Umpires: McBurney, H. Ryan, Hay; Television broadcast: Foxtel
Sylvia 5, Jones 3, Jurrah 3, Trengove 2, Watts, Bennell, Green, Petterd	Goals	Miller 3, Martin 3, Riewoldt 2, Foley 2, King, Graham, Jackson, Nahas, Webberley, Cotchin, Edwards
Sylvia, Jones, McKenzie, Bartram, Frawley	Best	Foley, Miller, Houli, Grigg, Tuck, Martin
Milestones: Aaron Davey (150th AFL Game), Ricky Petterd (50th AFL Game); Brownlow Votes: Colin Sylvia (Melbourne) 3 votes, Nathan Foley (Richmond) 2 votes, Nathan Jones (Melbourne) 1 vote Record: 7 Wins, 12 Losses, 1 Draw (82.9%); Ladder Position: 13th Substitutes: Brad Green ▲ Jeremy Howe ▼

==== Round 23 ====
Round 23
Sunday, 28 August (2:10 pm)	Melbourne	def.	Gold Coast	MCG (crowd: 21,534)	Report
4.3 (27); 7.5 (47); 13.7 (85); 17.10 (112)	Q1; Q2; Q3; Final	1.2 (8); 6.5 (35); 7.8 (50); 12.10 (82)	Umpires: Ritchie, Stewart, Schmitt; Television broadcast: Seven Network
Green 4, Jurrah 3, Moloney 3, Howe 2, Jones, Tapscott, Martin, Garland, Jetta	Goals	Bennell 2, Smith 2, Rischitelli 2, Russell 2, Swallow, Stanley, N. Ablett, Thompson
Blease, Garland, Moloney, Jones, Jamar, Green, McDonald	Best	Rischitelli, G. Ablett, Swallow, Prestia, Stanley
Jurrah (shoulder)	Injuries	Hickey (corked quad)
Debut(s): Tom McDonald; Brownlow Votes: Colin Garland (Melbourne) 3 votes, Sam Blease (Melbourne) 2 votes, Brent Moloney (Melbourne) 1 vote Record: 8 Wins, 12 Losses, 1 Draw (84.9%); Ladder Position: 12th Substitutes: Jeremy Howe ▲ Liam Jurrah ▼

==== Round 24 ====
Round 24
Sunday, 4 September (2:40 pm)	Port Adelaide	def.	Melbourne	Adelaide Oval (crowd: 29, 340)	Report
3.2 (20); 8.4 (52); 13.6 (84); 17.10 (112)	Q1; Q2; Q3; Final	3.6 (24); 7.11 (53); 10.12 (72); 15.14 (104)	Umpires: Stewart, H. Ryan, Schmitt; Television broadcast: Network Seven
Westhoff 4, Ebert 3, Rodan 2, Boak 2, Banner, Gray, Motlop, Butcher, Salopek, Schulz	Goals	Jones 2, McKenzie 2, Green 2, Martin 2, Morton, Bate, Jamar, Trengove, Howe, Jetta, Fitzpatrick
Westhoff, Gray, Boak, Ebert, Motlop, Salopek, Rodan	Best	Moloney, Trengove, McKenzie, Jones, Howe, Bate
Surjan (right calf/ankle), Butcher (back), Carlile (quad)	Injuries	Blease (head knock)
Debut(s): Jack Fitzpatrick; Milestones: Stefan Martin (50th AFL Game), Jack Fitzpatrick (1st AFL Goal); Brownlow Votes: Brent Moloney (Melbourne) 3 votes, Brett Ebert (Port Adelaide) 2 votes, Steven Salopek (Port Adelaide) 1 vote Record: 8 Wins, 13 Losses, 1 Draw (85.3%); Ladder Position: 13th Substitutes: Luke Tapscott ▲ Sam Blease ▼

== Ladder ==
2011 AFL ladder
Pos	Team	Pld	W	L	D	PF	PA	PP	Pts	
1	Collingwood	22	20	2	0	2592	1546	167.7	80	Finals series
2	Geelong (P)	22	19	3	0	2548	1619	157.4	76	Finals series
3	Hawthorn	22	18	4	0	2355	1634	144.1	72	Finals series
4	West Coast	22	17	5	0	2235	1715	130.3	68	Finals series
5	Carlton	22	14	7	1	2225	1700	130.9	58	Finals series
6	St Kilda	22	12	9	1	1891	1677	112.8	50	Finals series
7	Sydney	22	12	9	1	1897	1735	109.3	50	Finals series
8	Essendon	22	11	10	1	2217	2217	100.0	46	Finals series
9	North Melbourne	22	10	12	0	2106	2082	101.2	40	
10	Western Bulldogs	22	9	13	0	2060	2155	95.6	36	
11	Fremantle	22	9	13	0	1791	2155	83.1	36	
12	Richmond	22	8	13	1	2069	2396	86.4	34	
13	Melbourne	22	8	13	1	1974	2315	85.3	34	
14	Adelaide	22	7	15	0	1742	2193	79.4	28	
15	Brisbane Lions	22	4	18	0	1814	2240	81.0	16	
16	Port Adelaide	22	3	19	0	1718	2663	64.5	12	
17	Gold Coast	22	3	19	0	1534	2726	56.3	12	

Source: AFL ladder
Rules for classification: 1) points; 2) percentage; 3) number of points for.
(P) Premiers

== Awards and milestones ==
Home and away season
Player	Milestone	Reached
Luke Tapscott	AFL debut	27 March 2011
Mark Jamar	100th game	28 April 2011
Michael Evans	AFL debut	21 May 2011
Nathan Jones	100th game	27 May 2011
Daniel Nicholson	AFL debut	27 May 2011
Max Gawn	AFL debut	3 June 2011
Jeremy Howe	AFL debut	3 June 2011
Sam Blease	AFL debut	1 July 2011
Colin Garland	50th game	1 July 2011
