= 2012 Collingwood Football Club season =

Collingwood Football Club
2012 season
- President: Eddie McGuire
- Coach: Nathan Buckley (1st season)
- Captains: Nick Maxwell (4th season)
- Home ground: The MCG
- Pre-season competition: 13th
- Regular season: 4th
- Finals series: Preliminary Final
- Best and Fairest: Dayne Beams
- Leading goalkicker: Travis Cloke (59 goals)
- Highest home attendance: 86,932 vs. Essendon (Round 5)
- Lowest home attendance: 30,741 vs. Port Adelaide (Round 4)
- Average home attendance: 59,799
- Club membership: 72,688

The 2012 Collingwood Football Club season was the club's 116th season of senior competition in the Australian Football League (AFL). The club also fielded its reserves team in the VFL.

== Squad ==
Players are listed by guernsey number, and 2012 statistics are for AFL regular season and finals series matches during the 2012 AFL season only. Career statistics include a player's complete AFL career, which, as a result, means that a player's debut and part or whole of their career statistics may be for another club. Statistics are correct as of 2nd Preliminary Final of the 2012 season (21 September 2012) and are taken from AFL Tables.

No.	Name	AFL debut	Games (2012)	Goals (2012)	Games (CFC)	Goals (CFC)	Games (AFL career)	Goals (AFL career)
1	Alex Fasolo	2011	24	28	37	44	37	44
2	Chris Tarrant	1998	12	6	196	307	268	367
4	Alan Didak	2001	11	6	213	271	213	271
5	Nick Maxwell (c)	2004	20	2	179	28	179	28
6	Tyson Goldsack	2007	22	24	91	31	91	31
7	Andrew Krakouer	2001 (Richmond)	4	5	27	40	129	142
8	Harry O'Brien	2005	24	3	159	18	159	18
9	Martin Clarke	2007	17	0	63	16	63	16
10	Scott Pendlebury (vc)	2006	21	8	148	95	148	95
11	Jarryd Blair	2010	23	17	59	50	59	50
12	Luke Ball	2003 (St Kilda)	3	0	51	25	193	83
13	Dale Thomas	2006	20	22	152	121	152	121
14	Luke Rounds	2011	1	0	6	1	6	1
15	Jarrod Witts	****	0	0	0	0	0	0
16	Nathan Brown	2008	18	0	68	6	68	6
17	Dayne Beams	2009	24	28	73	89	73	89
18	Darren Jolly	2001 (Melbourne)	20	12	62	48	228	118
19	Cameron Wood	2005 (Brisbane Lions)	6	3	48	21	64	21
20	Ben Reid	2007	20	1	73	5	73	5
21	Sharrod Wellingham	2008	20	13	92	55	92	55
22	Steele Sidebottom	2009	24	14	85	66	85	66
23	Lachlan Keeffe	2011	9	1	14	5	14	5
24	Josh Thomas	****	0	0	0	0	0	0
25	Tom Young	2011	7	0	9	2	9	2
26	Ben Johnson	2000	8	1	232	70	232	70
27	Simon Buckley	2007 (Melbourne)	13	2	26	7	47	10
28	Ben Sinclair	2011	20	14	24	16	24	16
29	Jonathon Ceglar	****	0	0	0	0	0	0
30	Brent Macaffer	2009	0	0	30	21	30	21
31	Chris Dawes	2008	23	16	71	83	71	83
32	Travis Cloke	2005	25	59	174	283	174	283
33	Jackson Paine	2012	6	8	6	8	6	8
34	Alan Toovey	2007	22	0	109	8	109	8
35	Jamie Elliott	2012	15	6	15	6	15	6
36	Dane Swan	2003	21	25	196	158	196	158
37	Kirk Ugle	2012	3	0	3	0	3	0
38	Peter Yagmoor	2012	2	0	2	0	2	0
39	Heath Shaw	2005	21	9	153	36	153	36
40	Paul Seedsman	2012	11	2	11	2	11	2
41	Daniel Farmer	****	0	0	0	0	0	0
43	Trent Stubbs	****	0	0	0	0	0	0
44	Corey Gault	****	0	0	0	0	0	0
45	Lachlan Smith	****	0	0	0	0	0	0
46	Marley Williams	2012	6	1	6	1	6	1
47	Michael Hartley	****	0	0	0	0	0	0
48	Caolan Mooney	2012	4	1	4	1	4	1
49	Paul Cribbin	****	0	0	0	0	0	0
50	Shae McNamara	****	0	0	0	0	0	0

=== Squad changes ===
==== In ====
No.	Name	Position	Previous club	via
9	(Northern Ireland) Martin Clarke	Defender	Down	trade
35	(Victoria (state)) Jamie Elliott	Forward	Murray Bushrangers	trade
38	(Queensland) Peter Yagmoor	Defender / Midfielder	Gold Coast	trade
33	(Victoria (state)) Jackson Paine	Forward	Sandringham Dragons	AFL National Draft, third round (pick #50)
44	(Western Australia) Corey Gault	Forward	Swan Districts	AFL National Draft, third round (pick #65)
15	(New South Wales) Jarrod Witts	Ruckman	Sydney University	AFL National Draft, fourth round (pick #67)
45	(Victoria (state)) Lachlan Smith	Forward	Murray Bushrangers	AFL Rookie Draft, first round (pick #17)
46	(Western Australia) Marley Williams	Defender	Claremont	AFL Rookie Draft, second round (pick #35)
43	(New South Wales) Trent Stubbs	Forward	Collingwood	AFL Rookie Draft, third round (pick #53)
41	(Victoria (state)) Daniel Farmer	Forward	Collingwood	AFL Rookie Draft, fourth round (pick #70)
48	(Northern Ireland) Caolan Mooney	Forward	Down	AFL Rookie Draft, fifth round (pick #81)
47	(New South Wales) Michael Hartley	Defender	Sydney University	AFL Rookie Draft, sixth round (pick #87)

==== Out ====
No.	Name	Position	New Club	via
1	(Western Australia) Leon Davis	Forward		retired
3	(Victoria (state)) John McCarthy	Midfielder		delisted
33	(Western Australia) Brad Dick	Midfielder / Forward		delisted
41	(Victoria (state)) Daniel Farmer	Forward		delisted
43	(New South Wales) Trent Stubbs	Forward		delisted
44	(Victoria (state)) Tom Gordon	Forward		delisted
46	(Victoria (state)) Declan Reilly	Forward		delisted
47	(Western Australia) Jack Perham	Defender		delisted
48	(Victoria (state)) Jye Bolton	Midfielder		delisted
2	(Victoria (state)) Chris Tarrant	Defender / Forward		retired

== Season summary ==
=== Pre-season matches ===
Collingwood's 2012 NAB Cup fixtures (Week 1 – Lightning matches)
Round	Date and local time	Opponent	Scores^{[a]}			Venue	Attendance	Ladder position	Ref
Round	Date and local time	Opponent	Home	Away	Result	Venue	Attendance	Ladder position	Ref
1	Saturday, 18 February (8:20 pm)	Western Bulldogs	0.3.1 (19)	0.4.2 (26)	Won by 7 points	Blacktown International Sportspark [A]	7,086	3rd	
1	Saturday, 18 February (9:25 pm)	Greater Western Sydney	0.5.2 (32)	0.5.5 (35)	Won by 3 points	Blacktown International Sportspark [A]	7,086	3rd	

Collingwood's 2012 NAB Cup fixtures (Weeks 2, 3 & 4 – Full-length matches)
Round	Date and local time	Opponent	Scores^{[a]}			Venue	Attendance	Ladder position	Ref
Round	Date and local time	Opponent	Home	Away	Result	Venue	Attendance	Ladder position	Ref
2	Saturday, 3 March (7:40 pm)	Melbourne	1.9.7 (70)	0.11.13 (79)	Lost by 9 points	Etihad Stadium [H]	12,954	9th	
3	Friday, 9 March (8:10 pm)	Adelaide	1.20.9 (138)	1.7.10 (61)	Lost by 77 points	AAMI Stadium [A]	12,062	13th	
4	Friday, 16 March (4:00 pm)	St Kilda	10.20 (80)	6.11 (47)	Won by 33 points	Visy Park [H]	3,000	—N/a	

=== Regular season ===
Collingwood's 2012 AFL season fixtures
Round	Date and local time	Opponent	Home	Away	Result	Venue	Attendance	Ladder position	Ref
Round	Date and local time	Opponent	Scores^{[a]}			Venue	Attendance	Ladder position	Ref
1	Friday, 30 March (7:50 pm)	Hawthorn	20.17 (137)	16.19 (115)	Lost by 22 points	MCG [A]	78,464	13th	
2	Saturday, 7 April (7:40 pm)	Richmond	12.13 (85)	8.16 (64)	Won by 21 points	MCG [H]	57,268	9th	
3	Friday, 13 April (7:50 pm)	Carlton	18.14 (122)	9.8 (62)	Lost by 60 points	MCG [A]	84,259	13th	
4	Saturday, 21 April (2:10 pm)	Port Adelaide	14.13 (97)	10.13 (73)	Won by 24 points	Etihad Stadium [H]	30,741	12th	
5	Wednesday, 25 April (2:40 pm)	Essendon	11.14 (80)	11.13 (79)	Won by 1 point	MCG [H]	86,932	10th	
6	Friday, 4 May (7:50 pm)	Western Bulldogs	11.11 (77)	15.8 (98)	Won by 21 points	Etihad Stadium [A]	38,155	8th	
7	Saturday, 12 May (7:40 pm)	Brisbane Lions	8.10 (58)	17.14 (116)	Won by 58 points	The Gabba [A]	27,926	7th	
8	Friday, 18 May (7:50 pm)	Geelong	14.12 (96)	11.18 (84)	Won by 12 points	MCG [H]	75,650	5th	
9	Saturday, 26 May (7:10 pm)	Adelaide	6.11 (49)	10.15 (75)	Won by 26 points	AAMI Stadium [A]	44,238	4th	
10	Sunday, 3 June (4:40 pm)	Gold Coast	23.11 (149)	7.10 (52)	Won by 97 points	MCG [H]	36,913	4th	
11	Monday, 11 June (3:15 pm)	Melbourne	13.9 (87)	19.15 (129)	Won by 42 points	MCG [A]	64,250	1st	
12	Bye							3rd	
13	Saturday, 23 June (4:40 pm)	West Coast	12.13 (85)	12.10 (82)	Won by 3 points	MCG [H]	62,957	1st	
14	Saturday, 30 June (1:45 pm)	Fremantle	15.17 (107)	12.6 (78)	Won by 29 points	MCG [H]	44,891	1st	
15	Friday, 6 July (7:50 pm)	Carlton	8.14 (62)	12.13 (85)	Lost by 23 points	MCG [H]	75,755	4th	
16	Saturday, 14 July (7:40 pm)	Geelong	10.19 (79)	17.8 (110)	Won by 31 points	MCG [A]	61,717	3rd	
17	Saturday, 21 July (1:45 pm)	Hawthorn	13.13 (91)	21.12 (138)	Lost by 47 points	MCG [H]	83,714	4th	
18	Saturday, 28 July (4:40 pm)	Greater Western Sydney	7.12 (54)	26.18 (174)	Won by 120 points	Škoda Stadium [A]	8,102	4th	
19	Saturday, 4 August (7:40 pm)	St Kilda	12.19 (91)	13.7 (85)	Won by 6 points	MCG [H]	57,873	3rd	
20	Saturday, 11 August (7:40 pm)	Sydney	9.16 (70)	12.6 (78)	Won by 8 points	ANZ Stadium [A]	45,827	3rd	
21	Saturday, 18 August (7:40 pm)	North Melbourne	8.13 (61)	13.13 (91)	Lost by 30 points	Etihad Stadium [H]	44,956	4th	
22	Saturday, 25 August (5:40 pm)	West Coast	15.17 (107)	8.10 (58)	Lost by 49 points	Patersons Stadium [A]	40,527	5th	
23	Saturday, 1 September (7:40 pm)	Essendon	10.12 (72)	14.20 (104)	Won by 32 points	MCG [A]	56,491	4th	

=== Finals series ===
Collingwood's 2012 AFL finals series fixtures
Round	Date and local time	Opponent	Home	Away	Result	Venue	Attendance	Ref
Round	Date and local time	Opponent	Scores^{[a]}			Venue	Attendance	Ref
1st Qualifying Final	Friday, 7 September (7:50 pm)	Hawthorn	20.15 (135)	15.7 (97)	Lost by 38 points	MCG [A]	84,625	
1st Semi-Final	Saturday, 15 September (7:45 pm)	West Coast	10.13 (73)	9.6 (60)	Won by 13 points	MCG [H]	65,483	
2nd Preliminary Final	Friday, 21 September (7:50 pm)	Sydney	13.18 (96)	10.10 (70)	Lost by 26 points	ANZ Stadium [A]	57,156	
Collingwood was eliminated from the 2012 AFL finals series

=== Ladder ===
2012 AFL ladder
Pos	Team	Pld	W	L	D	PF	PA	PP	Pts	
1	Hawthorn	22	17	5	0	2679	1733	154.6	68	Finals series
2	Adelaide	22	17	5	0	2428	1833	132.5	68	Finals series
3	Sydney (P)	22	16	6	0	2290	1629	140.6	64	Finals series
4	Collingwood	22	16	6	0	2123	1823	116.5	64	Finals series
5	West Coast	22	15	7	0	2244	1807	124.2	60	Finals series
6	Geelong	22	15	7	0	2209	1886	117.1	60	Finals series
7	Fremantle	22	14	8	0	1956	1691	115.7	56	Finals series
8	North Melbourne	22	14	8	0	2359	2097	112.5	56	Finals series
9	St Kilda	22	12	10	0	2347	1903	123.3	48	
10	Carlton	22	11	11	0	2079	1925	108.0	44	
11	Essendon	22	11	11	0	2091	2090	100.0	44	
12	Richmond	22	10	11	1	2169	1943	111.6	42	
13	Brisbane Lions	22	10	12	0	1904	2092	91.0	40	
14	Port Adelaide	22	5	16	1	1691	2144	78.9	22	
15	Western Bulldogs	22	5	17	0	1542	2301	67.0	20	
16	Melbourne	22	4	18	0	1580	2341	67.5	16	
17	Gold Coast	22	3	19	0	1509	2481	60.8	12	
18	Greater Western Sydney	22	2	20	0	1270	2751	46.2	8	

Rules for classification: 1) points; 2) percentage; 3) number of points for.
(P) Premiers

=== Awards & Milestones ===
==== AFL Awards ====
- Anzac Medal – Dane Swan (Round 5)
- Member of the 2012 All-Australian team (left-wing) – Dayne Beams
- Member of the 2012 All-Australian team (interchange) – Scott Pendlebury
- Member of the 2012 All-Australian team (interchange) – Dane Swan

==== AFL Award Nominations ====
- Round 7 – 2012 AFL Mark of the Year nomination – Heath Shaw
- Round 8 – 2012 AFL Goal of the Year nomination – Scott Pendlebury
- Round 8 – 2012 AFL Mark of the Year nomination – Travis Cloke
- Round 11 – 2012 AFL Mark of the Year nomination – Sharrod Wellingham
- Round 13 – 2012 AFL Mark of the Year nomination – Jamie Elliott

==== Milestones ====
- Round 1 – Jackson Paine (AFL debut)
- Round 1 – Paul Seedsman (AFL debut)
- Round 1 – Peter Yagmoor (AFL debut)
- Round 1 – Travis Cloke (150 games)
- Round 1 – Dale Thomas (100 goals)
- Round 2 – Chris Dawes (50 games)
- Round 2 – Luke Ball (50 Collingwood games)
- Round 5 – Kirk Ugle (AFL debut)
- Round 9 – Jamie Elliott (AFL debut)
- Round 9 – Marley Williams (AFL debut)
- Round 11 – Darren Jolly (50 Collingwood games)
- Round 11 – Sharrod Wellingham (50 goals)
- Round 14 – Caolan Mooney (AFL debut)
- Round 16 – Jarryd Blair (50 games)
- Round 16 – Alan Toovey (100 games)
- Round 16 – Harry O'Brien (150 games)
- Round 23 – Heath Shaw (150 games)
- 1st Qualifying Final – Dale Thomas (150 games)
- 1st Semi-Final – Jarryd Blair (50 goals)

== VFL season ==
=== Pre-season matches ===
Collingwood's 2012 VFL pre-season fixture
Date and local time	Opponent	Home	Away	Result	Venue	Ref
Date and local time	Opponent	Scores^{[a]}			Venue	Ref
Saturday, 25 February (11:00 am)	Geelong	6.14 (50)	8.7 (55)	Won by 5 points	Simonds Stadium [A]	
Saturday, 3 March (12:00 pm)	Frankston	7.6 (48)	6.5 (41)	Lost by 7 points	Frankston Park [A]	
Saturday, 10 March (11:00 am)	Northern Blues	5.10 (40)	6.2 (38)	Lost by 2 points	Visy Park [A]	
Saturday, 17 March (11:00 am)	Geelong	12.14 (86)	9.7 (61)	Lost by 25 points	Simonds Stadium [A]	
Friday, 23 March	Bendigo	6.7 (43)	5.3 (33)	Won by 10 points	Gosch's Paddock [H]	

=== Regular season ===
Collingwood's 2012 VFL season fixture
Round	Date and local time	Opponent	Home	Away	Result	Venue	Ladder position	Ref
Round	Date and local time	Opponent	Scores^{[a]}			Venue	Ladder position	Ref
1	Bye						11th	
2	Saturday, 31 March (1:00 pm)	Geelong	14.11 (95)	11.17 (83)	Lost by 12 points	Simonds Stadium [A]	9th	
3	Saturday, 7 April (1:10 pm)	North Ballarat	7.19 (61)	15.16 (106)	Lost by 45 points	Victoria Park [H]	12th	
4	Saturday, 14 April (2:00 pm)	Northern Blues	13.13 (91)	15.8 (98)	Won by 7 points	Preston City Oval [A]	9th	
5	Saturday, 21 April (1:10 pm)	Box Hill	20.10 (130)	11.9 (75)	Lost by 55 points	Box Hill City Oval [A]	11th	
6	Saturday, 28 April (1:10 pm)	Sandringham	16.16 (112)	18.15 (123)	Lost by 11 points	Victoria Park [H]	11th	
7	Bye						11th	
8	Saturday, 12 May (2:00 pm)	Port Melbourne	15.11 (101)	10.20 (80)	Won by 21 points	Victoria Park [H]	10th	
9	Saturday, 19 May (1:00 pm)	Bendigo	8.13 (61)	13.15 (93)	Lost by 32 points	Victoria Park [H]	10th	
10	Saturday, 2 June (2:00 pm)	Werribee	26.18 (174)	10.5 (65)	Lost by 109 points	Avalon Airport Oval [A]	11th	
11	Saturday, 9 June (2:00 pm)	Casey	13.12 (90)	11.11 (77)	Lost by 13 points	Casey Fields [A]	11th	
12	Bye						11th	
13	Sunday, 24 June (2:00 pm)	Coburg	10.23 (83)	9.3 (57)	Lost by 26 points	Piranha Park [A]	11th	
14	Sunday, 1 July (1:00 pm)	Frankston	10.14 (74)	7.10 (52)	Won by 22 points	Victoria Park [H]	11th	
15	Sunday, 8 July (2:00 pm)	Williamstown	16.22 (118)	11.4 (70)	Lost by 48 points	Burbank Oval [A]	11th	
16	Saturday, 14 July (1:00 pm)	Geelong	7.6 (48)	11.18 (84)	Lost by 36 points	Victoria Park [H]	11th	
17	Saturday, 21 July (10:30 am)	Box Hill	4.13 (37)	23.15 (153)	Lost by 116 points	Victoria Park [H]	11th	
18	Bye						12th	
19	Saturday, 4 August (2:00 pm)	Bendigo	11.16 (82)	13.17 (95)	Won by 13 points	Queen Elizabeth Oval [A]	11th	
20	Sunday, 12 August (2:00 pm)	Sandringham	24.15 (159)	13.7 (85)	Lost by 74 points	Trevor Barker Oval [A]	12th	
21	Saturday, 18 August (1:00 pm)	Casey	5.10 (40)	11.19 (85)	Lost by 45 points	Victoria Park [H]	12th	
22	Saturday, 25 August (1:00 pm)	Werribee	8.6 (54)	20.16 (136)	Lost by 82 points	Victoria Park [H]	12th	

=== Ladder ===
Pos	Team	Pld	W	L	D	PF	PA	PP	Pts	Qualification
1	Casey	18	14	4	0	1633	1544	105.8	56	Finals
2	Port Melbourne	18	13	5	0	2051	1371	149.6	52	Finals
3	Geelong	18	13	5	0	1730	1398	123.7	52	Finals
4	Werribee	18	12	6	0	1906	1441	132.3	48	Finals
5	Williamstown	18	11	6	1	1591	1406	113.2	46	Finals
6	Sandringham	18	10	8	0	1724	1650	104.5	40	Finals
7	Box Hill	18	9	9	0	1653	1500	110.2	36	Finals
8	Bendigo	18	9	9	0	1691	1686	100.3	36	Finals
9	North Ballarat	18	9	9	0	1588	1747	90.9	36	
10	Northern Blues	18	6	12	0	1459	1591	91.7	24	
11	Coburg	18	4	14	0	1336	1861	71.8	16	
12	Collingwood	18	4	14	0	1293	1934	66.9	16	
13	Frankston	18	2	15	1	1182	1708	69.2	10	

Source: SportsTG
Rules for classification: 1) points; 2) percentage; 3) number of points for.

== Notes ==
Key

- H Home match.
- A Away match.

Notes

- **^{a}** Collingwood's scores are indicated in **bold** font.
