= 2012 AFL Mark of the Year =

- Date: 19 May
- Location: SCG
- Winner: Jeremy Howe (Melbourne)

The Australian Football League celebrates the best mark of the season through the annual Mark of the Year competition. In 2012, this is officially known as the Lifebroker AFL Mark of the Year. Each round three marks are nominated and fans are able to vote online for their favourite here .

== Winners by Round ==
Legend

= Round's Winning Mark

Round	Nominees	Team	% of votes	Opposition	Ground	Description
1	Clint Bartram	Melbourne	13%	Brisbane Lions	MCG	Clever one-handed mark
1	Cyril Rioli	Hawthorn	77%	Collingwood	MCG	High-flying hangar from Rioli
1	Sam Reid	Sydney	10%	Greater Western Sydney	ANZ Stadium	Reid makes it look easy
2	Eddie Betts	Carlton	61%	Brisbane Lions	The Gabba	Amazing hanger number 1
2	Eddie Betts	Carlton	31%	Brisbane Lions	The Gabba	Amazing hanger number 2
2	Tom Hawkins	Geelong	8%	Hawthorn	MCG	The Tomahawk takes a screamer
3	David Armitage	St Kilda	23%	Western Bulldogs	Etihad Stadium	Huge leap over pack
3	Chris Mayne	Fremantle	60%	Brisbane Lions	Patersons Stadium	Big grab from Milne
3	James Podsiadly	Geelong	17%	North Melbourne	Etihad Stadium	JPod takes a hanger
4	Jeremy Howe	Melbourne	52%	Western Bulldogs	MCG	Howe flies in the first quarter
4	Cyril Rioli	Hawthorn	23%	West Coast	Patersons Stadium	Clever marks against all odds
4	Jeremy Howe	Melbourne	25%	Western Bulldogs	MCG	Howe does it again
5	Jack Riewoldt	Richmond	23%	West Coast	Etihad Stadium	Jack's humungous hanger
5	Beau Waters	West Coast	61%	Richmond	Etihad Stadium	Spetacular grab
5	Brent Reilly	Adelaide	17%	Port Adelaide	AAMI Stadium	Reilly flies
6	Andrew Walker	Carlton	55%	Greater Western Sydney	Etihad Stadium	Walker takes a strong grab
6	Mitch Clark	Melbourne	26%	Geelong	Simonds Stadium	Flyer from Clark
6	Jeremy Howe	Melbourne	20%	Geelong	Simonds Stadium	Strong flying grab from Howe
7	Mitch Clark	Melbourne	10%	Hawthorn	MCG	Strong, confident mark
7	Drew Petrie	North Melbourne	15%	Western Bulldogs	Etihad Stadium	Flying mark flows into a goal
7	Heath Shaw	Collingwood	75%	Brisbane Lions	The Gabba	Acrobatic leap from Shaw
8	Mitch Robinson	Carlton	17%	Adelaide	Etihad Stadium	Very good mark from Robinson
8	Jeremy Howe	Melbourne	72%	Sydney	SCG	Howe takes a screamer
8	Travis Cloke	Collingwood	11%	Geelong	MCG	Great contested mark
9	Jack Riewoldt	Richmond	23%	Hawthorn	MCG	Riewoldt takes a screamer
9	Nic Naitanui	West Coast	70%	Fremantle	Patersons Stadium	Naitanui flies high
9	Liam Jones	Western Bulldogs	6%	Geelong	Etihad Stadium	Jones takes a mark from behind
10	Brendon Goddard	St Kilda	31%	Richmond	Etihad Stadium	Goddard takes a terrific mark
10	Jack Riewoldt	Richmond	39%	St Kilda	Etihad Stadium	Big leap from Riewoldt
10	Jay Schulz	Port Adelaide	30%	Carlton	AAMI Stadium	Great grab from Schulz
11	Dyson Heppell	Essendon	31%	Sydney	Etihad Stadium	Brilliant courage from Heppell
11	Andrew Walker	Carlton	36%	Geelong	Etihad Stadium	Walker replicates his spectacular style
11	Sharrod Wellingham	Collingwood	34%	Melbourne	MCG	Wellingham's brave leap
12	Drew Petrie	North Melbourne	38%	Gold Coast	Metricon Stadium	Strong grab from Petrie
12	Kurt Tippett	Adelaide	48%	St Kilda	AAMI Stadium	Tippett flies high
12	Jeremy Cameron	Greater Western Sydney	15%	Richmond	Skoda Stadium	Cameron takes a great grab
13	Rohan Bewick	Brisbane Lions	16%	Western Bulldogs	Etihad Stadium	Bewick takes a strong grab
13	Matthew Scarlett	Geelong	27%	Sydney	SCG	One-hander from Scarlett
13	Jamie Elliott	Collingwood	57%	West Coast	MCG	Elliott over the top
14
14	Jason Porplyzia	Adelaide	48%	Richmond	AAMI Stadium	Courageous mark from Porplyzia
14	Drew Petrie	North Melbourne	31%	St Kilda	Etihad Stadium	Petrie takes a contested mark
14	Rhys Palmer	Greater Western Sydney	21%	Sydney	ANZ Stadium	Palmer Flies
15
15	Ryan O'Keefe	Sydney	54%	Brisbane Lions	SCG	O'Keefe takes a strong mark
15	Tom Hawkins	Geelong	21%	Gold Coast	Metricon Stadium	Big leap from Hawkins
15	Nick Riewoldt	St Kilda	26%	Essendon	ANZ Stadium	Riewoldt takes a great contested mark
16
16	Richard Douglas	Adelaide	57%	Greater Western Sydney	Skoda Stadium	Douglas flies over the top
16	Matthew Boyd	Western Bulldogs	26%	Hawthorn	Etihad Stadium	Eyes for the footy from Boyd
16	Daniel Merrett	Brisbane Lions	17%	St Kilda	The Gabba	Merret takes a strong grab
17
17	Jeremy Howe	Melbourne	65%	Port Adelaide	TIO Stadium	Howe takes another screamer
17	Paul Puopolo	Hawthorn	20%	Collingwood	MCG	Puopolo over the top
17	Will Schofield	West Coast	15%	Adelaide	AAMI Stadium	Schofield takes a strong grab
18	Christopher Mayne	Fremantle	40%	Port Adelaide	AAMI Stadium	Big grab by Mayne
18	Nic Naitanui	West Coast	48%	Brisbane Lions	MCG	Naitanui flies high
18	Will Hoskin-Elliott	Greater Western Sydney	13%	Collingwood	Skoda Stadium	Hoskin-Elliott takes a hanger
19	Simon White	Carlton	27%	Sydney	Etihad Stadium	White takes a strong grab
19	Jeremy Howe	Melbourne	43%	Gold Coast	MCG	Howe over the top
19	Matthew Pavlich	Fremantle	29%	West Coast	Patersons Stadium	Spectacular from Pavlich
20	Jake Melksham	Essendon	22%	North Melbourne	Etihad Stadium	Big grab from behind
20	Jarrad Waite	Carlton	33%	Brisbane Lions	Etihad Stadium	Long hang time
20	Jeremy Howe	Melbourne	45%	St Kilda	MCG	Howe flies again
21
21	Jeremy Howe	Melbourne	70%	Greater Western Sydney	Manuka Oval	Howe's that again!
21	Shaun Edwards	Greater Western Sydney	11%	Melbourne	Manuka Oval	Confident hanger from the young Giant
21	Michael Hurley	Essendon	19%	Carlton	MCG	Hurley hangs onto it
22	Zac Clarke	Fremantle	30%	North Melbourne	Etihad Stadium	Big leap from Clarke
22	Rhys Stanley	St Kilda	22%	Greater Western Sydney	Etihad Stadium	Stanley back with the flight
22	Nic Naitanui	West Coast	48%	Collingwood	Patersons Stadium	One-hander on the line
23	Jay Schulz	Port Adelaide	37%	Richmond	MCG	Schulz back with the flight
23	Ivan Maric	Richmond	48%	Port Adelaide	MCG	Stanley back with the flight
23	Drew Petrie	North Melbourne	15%	Greater Western Sydney	Skoda Stadium	Commanding performance in the air

== 2012 Finalists ==
Round	Nominees	Team	Opposition	Ground	Description
8	Jeremy Howe	Melbourne	Sydney	SCG	Big air-time from Howe
17	Jeremy Howe	Melbourne	Port Adelaide	TIO Stadium	Howe takes a screamer
9	Nic Naitanui	West Coast	Fremantle	Patersons Stadium	Naitanui flies high

== See also ==
- Mark of the Year
- Goal of the Year
- 2012 AFL Goal of the Year
- 2012 AFL season
