= Ugle =

Ugle may refer to:

== People ==
- Gerald Ugle (born 1993), Australian rules footballer
- Keren Ugle (born 1979), Australian rules footballer
- Kirk Ugle (born 1992), Australian rules footballer
- Troy Ugle (born 1968), Australian rules footballer
- Jamarra Ugle-Hagan (born 2002), Australian rules footballer

== Other uses ==
- Provincial Grand Lodges (UGLE), administrative subdivision of a Grand Lodge
- United Grand Lodge of England, Masonic lodge
