= Stefan Martin =

Australian rules footballer

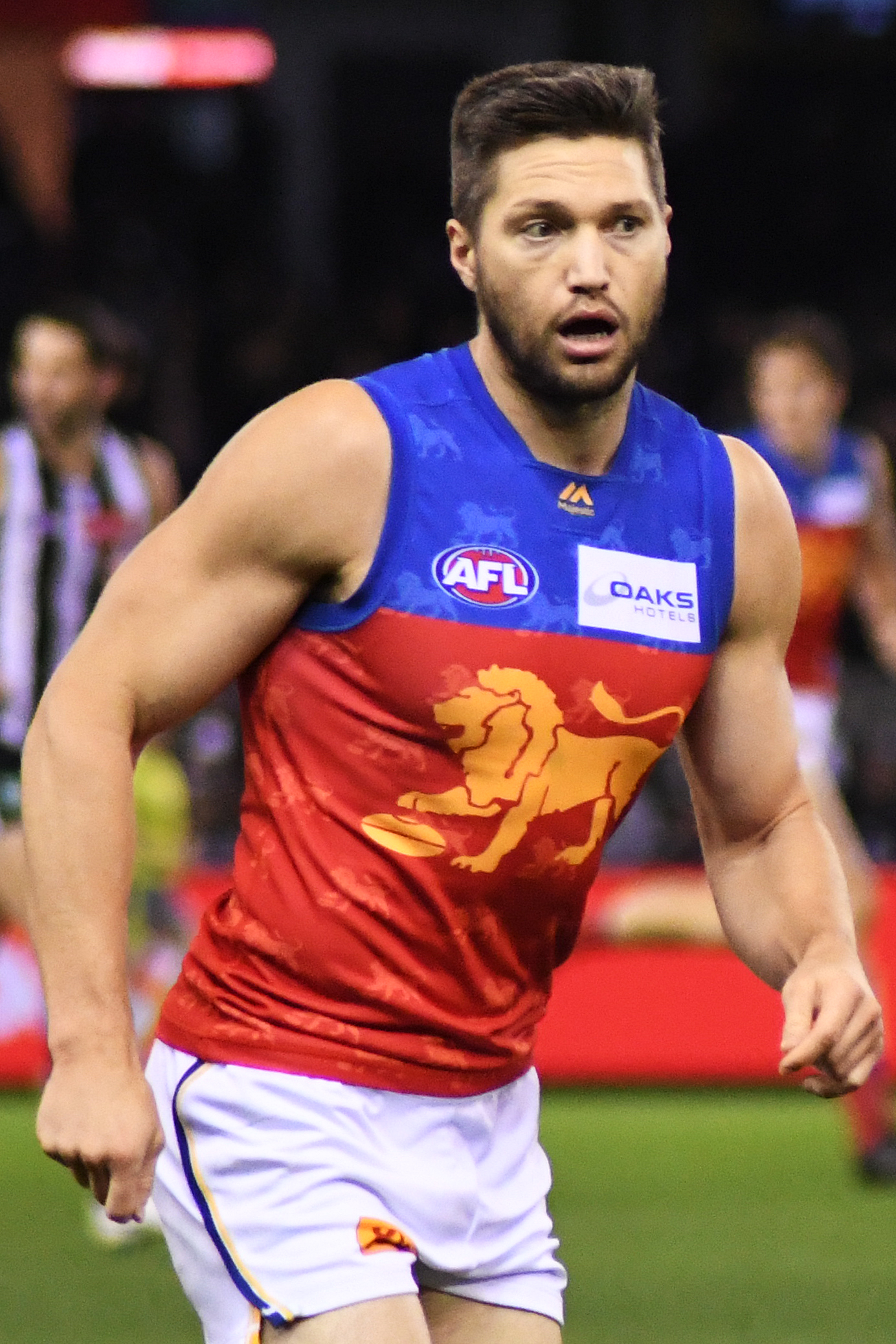
- Martin playing for the Brisbane Lions in August 2018

Personal information
- Full name: Stefan Martin
- Born: 17 November 1986 (age 39); Berwick, Victoria
- Original team: Sandringham (VFL)
- Height: 199 cm (6 ft 6 in)
- Weight: 102 kg (225 lb)
- Position: Ruck

Playing career^{1}
Years	Club	Games (Goals)
2008–2012	Melbourne	57 (23)
2013–2020	Brisbane Lions	133 (23)
2021–2022	Western Bulldogs	13 (1)
Total		202 (47)

Representative team honours
Years	Team	Games (Goals)
2020	Victoria	1 (0)
- ^{1} Playing statistics correct to the end of round 22, 2022.

Career highlights
- Merrett–Murray Medallist: 2015

Stefan Martin (born 17 November 1986) is a former professional Australian rules footballer who played for the Western Bulldogs, Brisbane Lions, and Melbourne in the Australian Football League (AFL).

== Early life ==
Martin grew up in Berwick, the second child of optometrists Peter and Rosemary Martin. Alongside his older brother Tim and younger sister Karina he grew up playing basketball. He played junior basketball at an elite level, starting out with the strong Dandenong Rangers program and progressing to the Nunawading Spectres senior team in the ABA. Along with his academic merit, his basketball abilities earned him a scholarship at Haileybury College and in 2003, the same year Martin made the Australian under-20s representative side. He played a test series for Australia in New Zealand as a raw 17-year-old shooting guard. Martin would graduate from Haileybury College with an entrance score of 99.75 in 2004 to finish in the top 40 Victorian students. He would go on in 2006 to study a science/law double degree.

In 2006, while still playing basketball, Martin decided to give in to his mates and join them at amateurs football club, Old Haileybury. He was 19 and had never played a football game before. He shocked everyone when he arrived up to his first game with a slurpee and doughnut. Martin ended his first season by winning the under 19 best and fairest after polling 23 of a possible 24 votes, he had been given best on ground in eight of the nine games he played. Martin had an article written about him in the Herald Sun and some AFL clubs were interested in him, most notably Melbourne Football Club who invited him to train and although he was overlooked in the 2007, Martin was asked to play at the Demons' VFL affiliate side at the time, Sandringham, so they could watch his development.

Martin started 2007 in Sandringham’s reserves, but was playing for the seniors as a ruckman soon after. He impressed enough to be selected in the VFL Under 23 South side. Later that year, much to his surprise, he was Melbourne's No. 3 pick in the 2008 pre-season draft.

== AFL career ==
=== Melbourne ===
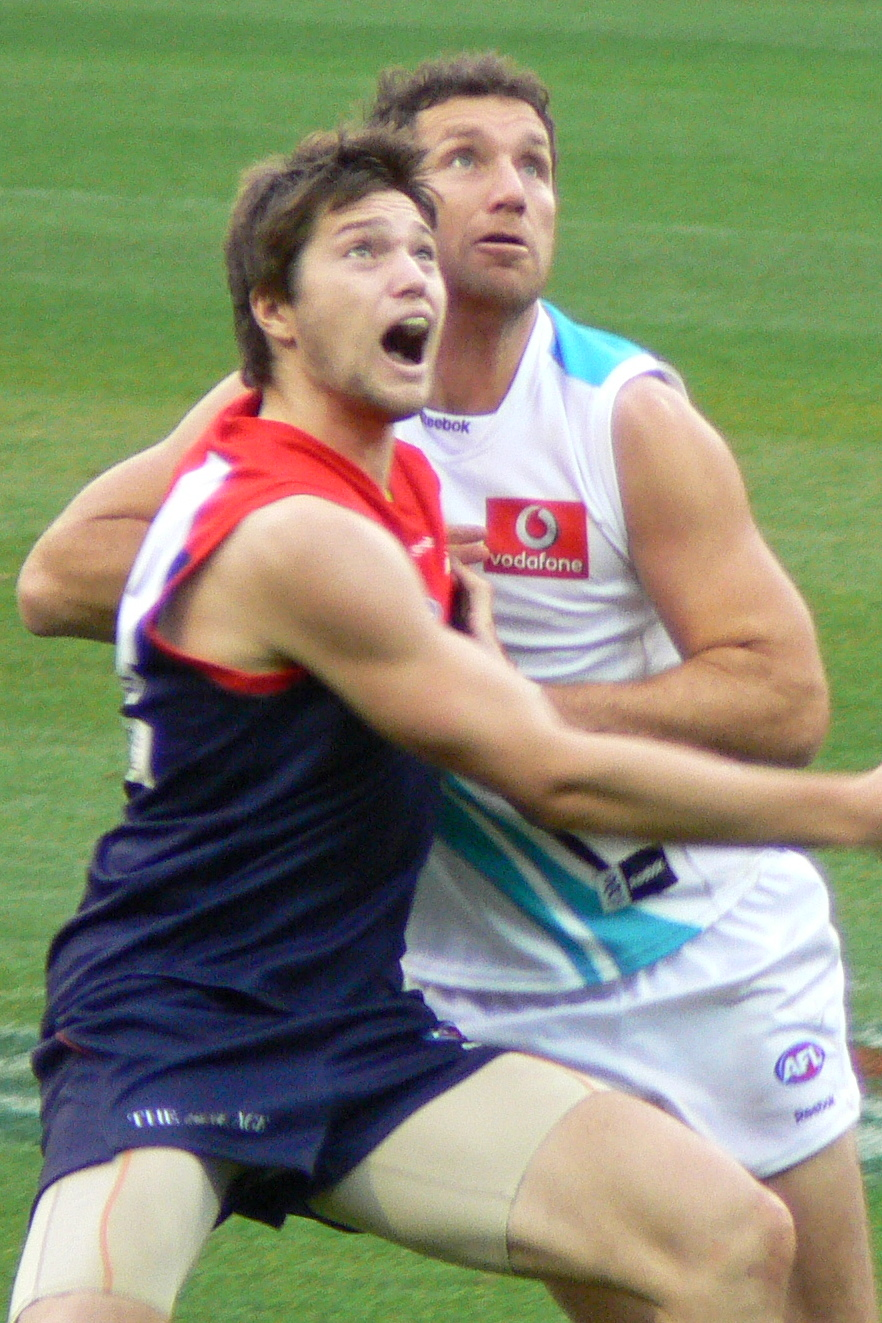
Martin (left) rucking against Port Adelaide's Brendon Lade in 2009

He made his debut in Round 14 for Melbourne's match against the Brisbane Lions at the MCG as a 22-year-old. He put in a solid performance and Melbourne managed its second win of the season. Despite playing most of his time at VFL level as a ruckman Martin was used as a defender for Melbourne showcasing his great leap, versatility, speed and agility for his height. He went on to play the next 8 games for Melbourne averaging 13 disposals and 4 marks a game. He competed in the 2008 AFL Grand Final Sprint, narrowly placing second to Richmond speedster Matthew White who won off scratch.

Martin was used as utility in 2009, beginning the season in the backline before being trialled in the ruck and up forward. He kicked six goals for the year from 19 games.

Persistent hip injuries cruelled his 2010 campaign and Martin only managed two games in round 5 and 6. A late season return through the Casey Demons reserves failed to win him a recall to the senior side and the injuries eventually finished his season.

2011 was a breakout year for Martin, as he played the number one ruck role in the absence of the injured Mark Jamar. He played 21 games, mostly in the ruck, he also proved dangerous when moved forward, kicked 10 goals for the season. He averaged 17 disposals, 14 hitouts and 2 tackles per game and ended up finishing 8th in Melbourne's club best and fairest.

Martin was expected to spend more time forward with the return of Jamar but injury and an inability to break into the side hurt Martin's 2012 campaign, and he played just seven matches for the season. After playing in round 1 and 3 he wasn't seen in the team again until round 14, but then played five in a row before a hip injury ended his year.

=== Brisbane Lions ===
On 26 October 2012, Martin was traded to the Brisbane Lions in exchange for Picks 52 (Matt Jones) & 71 (Daniel Nicholson). The Lions had planned Martin to play as a forward/ruck rotating with the first choice ruckman Matthew Leuenberger and first round draft pick Billy Longer. Martin's first season at Brisbane started well, with him playing a key role in the team's NAB Cup premiership side. He kicked goals in each of his first three AFL games with the Lions, before injuring his ankle early in the Round 4 clash against North Melbourne. Three weeks later he came back in the NEAFL but reinjured his ankle. It was not until round 19 that Martin would play in the NEAFL after his ankle injury. He impressed for the Lions reserves and was back in the AFL side for round 20. He only gathered six disposals and 10 hitouts against Richmond in a loss; however, he suffered a hamstring strain that would effectively end his campaign. Martin only managed five senior games in 2013.

After an injury plagued season in 2013, the start of 2014 looked to be another year of frustration for Martin as he continued through his second pre-season with the Lions with a combination of hamstring and back injuries, keeping him on the sidelines until round 9 of the AFL season. He played two NEAFL games and was back in the AFL team for round 12. With the trade of Longer to St Kilda, injury to Leuenberger and season-ending injury to Trent West, Martin was selected as Brisbane's first ruck against the Bulldogs. He gathered 17 disposals, 32 hitouts and six clearances against Will Minson, who was the All-Australian ruckman the previous year. Martin would then relish the responsibility as first ruck and went on to be one of the Lions' best performers in the second half of the season, producing career-best numbers almost every game. Martin's name was being thrown around in All-Australian discussions, with his stats more than matching up against the best in the competition. He was ultimately overlooked in the All-Australian squad due to only playing 12 games, but earned the first Brownlow Medal votes of his career, finishing on three votes in total. He finished 11th overall in the Merrett–Murray Medal, but ranked second behind eventual winner Tom Rockliff in votes per game with 85 votes from his 12 games, an average of seven per game. Martin used his mobility and agility as a ruckman to average 22 disposals a game, which was the most of any ruckman. His breakout year was rewarded with a new contract too see him out until the end of 2016.

Martin continued on his great form from 2014 into 2015, when he was joint winner of the Merrett–Murray Medal as Brisbane's best and fairest, alongside Dayne Beams, Mitch Robinson and Dayne Zorko. He averaged 32 hit outs and 21 disposals from 20 games in 2015 (missing two games due to suspension). He finished off the year with a huge performance in round 23 against the Western Bulldogs with 50 hitouts and 32 disposals in a win, gaining two Brownlow votes.

After two outstanding seasons, Martin dropped his performance in 2016 due to a number of injuries and setbacks including a head knock from Steven May that made global headlines in Round 4 against the Gold Coast Suns. Martin surprised with a return the very next week but it wasn't until round 7 that he looked like his old self with a career high 51 hitouts and 22 disposals against Port Adelaide. Martin's performance dropped in rounds 9 to 12 as West was selected for Brisbane; however, once West was dropped back to the NEAFL, Martin improved his numbers as the sole ruck. Missing rounds 19 and 20 due to soreness, he ended the season having played 20 games and averaged 16 disposals and 27 hitouts a game. He claimed the Alastair Lynch Trophy for 3rd place in the Merrett–Murray Medal.

=== Western Bulldogs ===
Martin was traded to the Western Bulldogs at the conclusion of the 2020 AFL season. He later played in the side's 2021 AFL Grand Final loss.

Martin retired following the 2022 AFL season

== Statistics ==
Statistics are correct to the end of the 2020 season

Legend
G	Goals	K	Kicks	D	Disposals	T	Tackles
B	Behinds	H	Handballs	M	Marks	H/O	Hit-outs

Season	Team	No.	Games	Totals								Averages (per game)							
Season	Team	No.	Games	G	B	K	H	D	M	T	H/O	G	B	K	H	D	M	T	H/O
2008	Melbourne	33	8	0	0	47	59	106	36	3	6	0.0	0.0	5.9	7.4	13.3	4.5	0.4	0.8
2009	Melbourne	34	19	6	6	76	113	189	59	22	114	0.3	0.3	4.0	5.9	9.9	3.1	1.2	6.0
2010	Melbourne	34	2	0	1	8	10	18	4	0	18	0.0	0.5	4.0	5.0	9.0	2.0	0.0	9.0
2011	Melbourne	34	21	10	4	225	139	364	96	42	314	0.5	0.2	10.7	6.6	17.3	4.6	2.0	15.0
2012	Melbourne	34	7	7	1	55	42	97	31	13	100	1.0	0.1	7.9	6.0	13.9	4.4	1.9	14.3
2013	Brisbane Lions	12	5	4	3	19	18	37	11	8	43	0.8	0.6	3.8	3.6	7.4	2.2	1.6	8.6
2014	Brisbane Lions	12	12	1	4	122	147	269	69	39	338	0.1	0.3	10.2	12.3	22.4	5.8	3.3	28.2
2015	Brisbane Lions	12	20	5	9	238	195	433	128	40	650	0.3	0.5	11.9	9.8	21.7	6.4	2.0	32.5
2016	Brisbane Lions	12	20	5	7	149	186	335	81	42	558	0.3	0.4	7.5	9.3	16.8	4.1	2.1	27.9
2017	Brisbane Lions	12	22	1	3	190	193	383	88	57	770	0.0	0.1	8.6	8.8	17.4	4.0	2.6	35.0
2018	Brisbane Lions	12	22	1	2	194	218	412	89	56	746	0.0	0.1	8.8	9.9	18.7	4.0	2.5	33.9
2019	Brisbane Lions	12	24	5	7	226	168	394	60	59	646	0.2	0.3	9.4	7.0	16.4	2.5	2.5	26.9
2020 (Note: The 2020 season was played with 17 home-and-away matches per team (down from 22) and 16-minute quarters with time on (down from 20-minute quarters with time on) due to the impact of the COVID-19 pandemic.)	Brisbane Lions	12	8	1	1	37	21	58	8	19	137	0.1	0.1	4.6	2.6	7.3	1.0	2.4	17.1
Career			190	46	48	1586	1509	3095	760	400	4440	0.2	0.3	8.4	7.9	16.3	4.0	2.1	23.4
