= Nathan Foley (footballer) =

Australian rules footballer

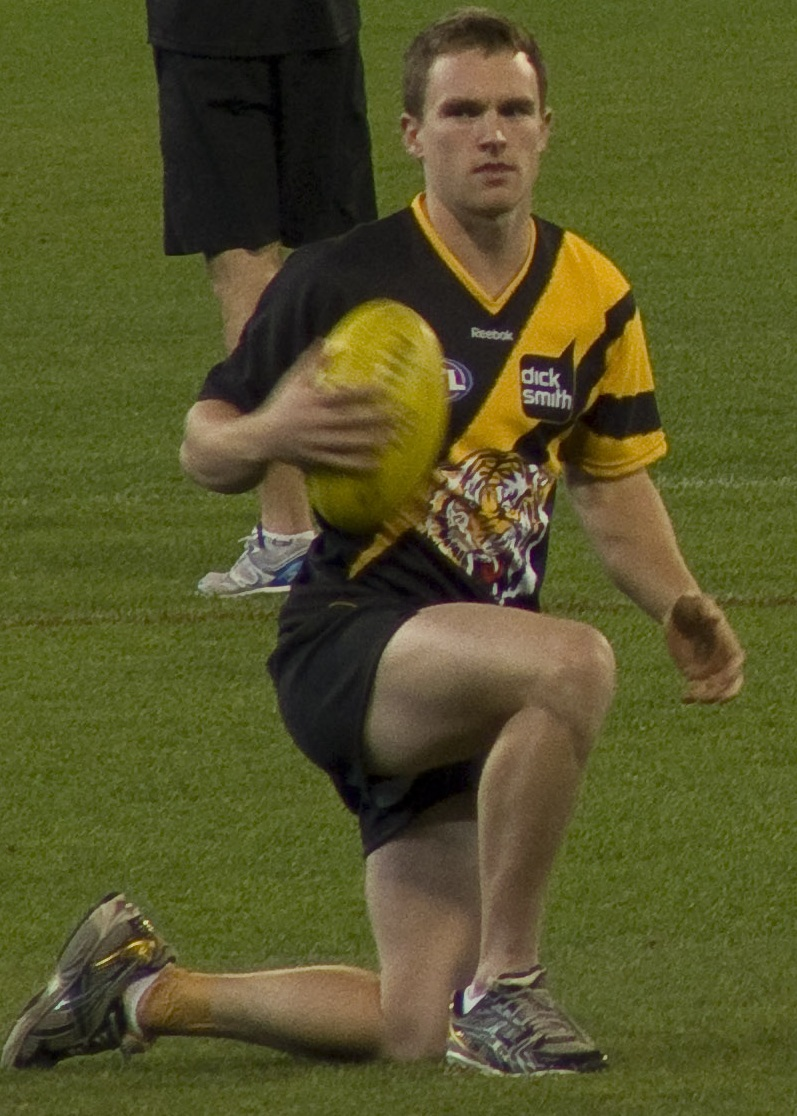

Personal information
- Full name: Nathan Foley
- Born: 8 September 1985 (age 41); Colac, Victoria
- Original team: Colac / Geelong Falcons
- Draft: 3rd overall, 2003 Rookie draft
- Height: 178 cm (5 ft 10 in)
- Weight: 80 kg (176 lb)
- Position: Midfielder

Playing career^{1}
Years	Club	Games (Goals)
2004–2015	Richmond	154 (44)

Representative team honours^{2}
Years	Team	Games (Goals)
2008	Victoria	1 (1)
- ^{1} Playing statistics correct to the end of 2015.^{2} Representative statistics correct as of 2008.

Career highlights
- Yiooken Award: 2008; All-Australian Squad: 2007

Nathan Foley (born 8 September 1985) is a former professional Australian rules footballer who played for the Richmond Football Club in the Australian Football League (AFL).

Foley was drafted by Richmond using pick 3 in the 2003 AFL Rookie Draft, from the Geelong Falcons. He made his debut in Round 10, 2005 against the Melbourne, in a match well remembered for the horrific broken leg sustained by Tigers' star Nathan Brown.

In 2007, Foley had a break-out season, establishing himself as one of the AFL's best on-ballers. He was selected in the squad of 40 for the All-Australian team, but missed out when the official 22-man team was released in September 2007. He was runner-up in the Jack Dyer Medal count, polling only one vote behind Matthew Richardson.

In 2008, Foley was named as Richmond's deputy vice captain along with Chris Newman.

Foley retired in August 2015 citing a degenerative knee injury forcing him into immediate retirement.

== Playing statistics ==
Legend
G	Goals	K	Kicks	D	Disposals	T	Tackles
B	Behinds	H	Handballs	M	Marks

Season	Team	No.	Games	Totals							Averages (per game)						
Season	Team	No.	Games	G	B	K	H	D	M	T	G	B	K	H	D	M	T
2005	Richmond	41	6	1	0	24	39	63	6	20	0.2	0.0	4.0	6.5	10.5	1.0	3.3
2006	Richmond	41	21	3	2	177	156	333	55	70	0.1	0.1	8.4	7.4	15.9	2.6	3.3
2007	Richmond	41	22	6	6	246	286	532	46	90	0.3	0.3	11.2	13.0	24.2	2.1	4.1
2008	Richmond	41	21	8	5	200	267	467	48	75	0.4	0.2	9.5	12.7	22.2	2.3	3.6
2009	Richmond	41	14	4	2	138	223	361	41	55	0.3	0.1	9.9	15.9	25.8	2.9	3.9
2010	Richmond	41	4	0	1	28	51	79	12	16	0.0	0.3	7.0	12.8	19.8	3.0	4.0
2011	Richmond	41	22	11	8	226	248	474	55	122	0.5	0.4	10.3	11.3	21.5	2.5	5.5
2012	Richmond	41	10	1	6	110	123	233	38	58	0.1	0.6	11.0	12.3	23.3	3.8	5.8
2013	Richmond	41	16	6	5	151	141	292	54	65	0.4	0.3	9.4	8.8	18.3	3.4	4.1
2014	Richmond	41	18	4	3	136	167	303	39	73	0.2	0.2	7.6	9.3	16.8	2.2	4.1
2015	Richmond	41	0	—	—	—	—	—	—	—	—	—	—	—	—	—	—
Career			154	44	38	1436	1701	3137	394	644	0.3	0.2	9.3	11.0	20.4	2.6	4.2
