= Addam Maric =

Australian rules footballer

Personal information
- Full name: Addam Maric
- Born: 18 April 1990 (age 36); Melbourne
- Original team: Greenvale/Calder Cannons
- Height: 177 cm (5 ft 10 in)
- Weight: 76 kg (168 lb)

Playing career^{1}
Years	Club	Games (Goals)
2008–2011	Melbourne	21 (15)
2012	Richmond	10 (1)
Total		31 (16)
- ^{1} Playing statistics correct to the end of Round 2012.

Career highlights
- U/18 Vic Metro representative, 2007

Addam Maric (born 18 April 1990) is a former professional Australian rules footballer who played for Richmond and Melbourne in the Australian Football League (AFL). He is unrelated to former Richmond teammate, Ivan Maric and their surnames are pronounced differently (Addam "Marrick" and Ivan "Marrich").

Maric plays as a small forward, but can also be used in the backline. He represented Vic Metro at the NAB AFL U/18 National Championships in 2007. Maric was taken with the 21st selection in the National Draft in the 2007 AFL draft earning a reputation as one of the most accurate kicks in the under 18 competition. After spending most of the 2008 season playing for Melbourne's VFL affiliate Sandringham, Maric was named to play against North Melbourne at the MCG for round 17. He completed his year 12 (final year) at Penleigh and Essendon Grammar School.

Maric wore the number 19 for the Demons, and number 38 for Sandringham. He has been assigned number 47 for Richmond.

His final game for Melbourne was the round 19, 2011 match against Geelong at Kardinia Park in which the club suffered the second-worst defeat in V/AFL history, losing by 186 points – after which senior coach Dean Bailey was sacked.

After four years with Melbourne, in which Maric had only managed 21 matches and struggled to string together consecutive appearances, there was speculation in the 2011 trade week that he would be traded to North Melbourne. Although Melbourne list manager, Tim Harrington, said that "the deal will be done", it did not eventuate. Two days after trade week ended, the Demons delisted Maric. Maric nominated for the draft and expected to be selected by North Melbourne. After beginning the 2012 pre-season with Richmond however, the Tigers selected Maric with the seventh overall pick in the 2012 Rookie Draft.

After the completion of the 2012 season Richmond officially announced Maric's delisting from its playing list.
