= Kirk Ugle =

Australian rules footballer

Personal information
- Full name: Kirk Henry Ugle
- Born: 6 May 1992 (age 34)
- Original team: Swan Districts (WAFL)
- Draft: No. 60, 2010 National Draft, Collingwood
- Height: 172 cm (5 ft 8 in)
- Weight: 73 kg (161 lb)
- Position: Forward

Playing career^{1}
Years	Club	Games (Goals)
2011–2012	Collingwood	3 (0)
- ^{1} Playing statistics correct to the end of 2012.

Kirk Henry Ugle (born 6 May 1992) is an Australian rules footballer for the Swan Districts Football Club in the West Australian Football League. In 2012 he played for the Collingwood Football Club in the Australian Football League (AFL).

A speedy small forward from Bunbury, Western Australia, Ugle was selected by the Magpies with the 60th choice in the 2010 AFL draft. He made his AFL debut in the Anzac Day clash against Essendon in Round 5 of the 2012 season in front of almost 87,000 fans. He started the game as the substitute player and came on in the final quarter, replacing Paul Seedsman.

He is the cousin of West Coast Eagles Jamie Bennell.
