= Jeremy Howe =

Australian rules footballer (born 1990)

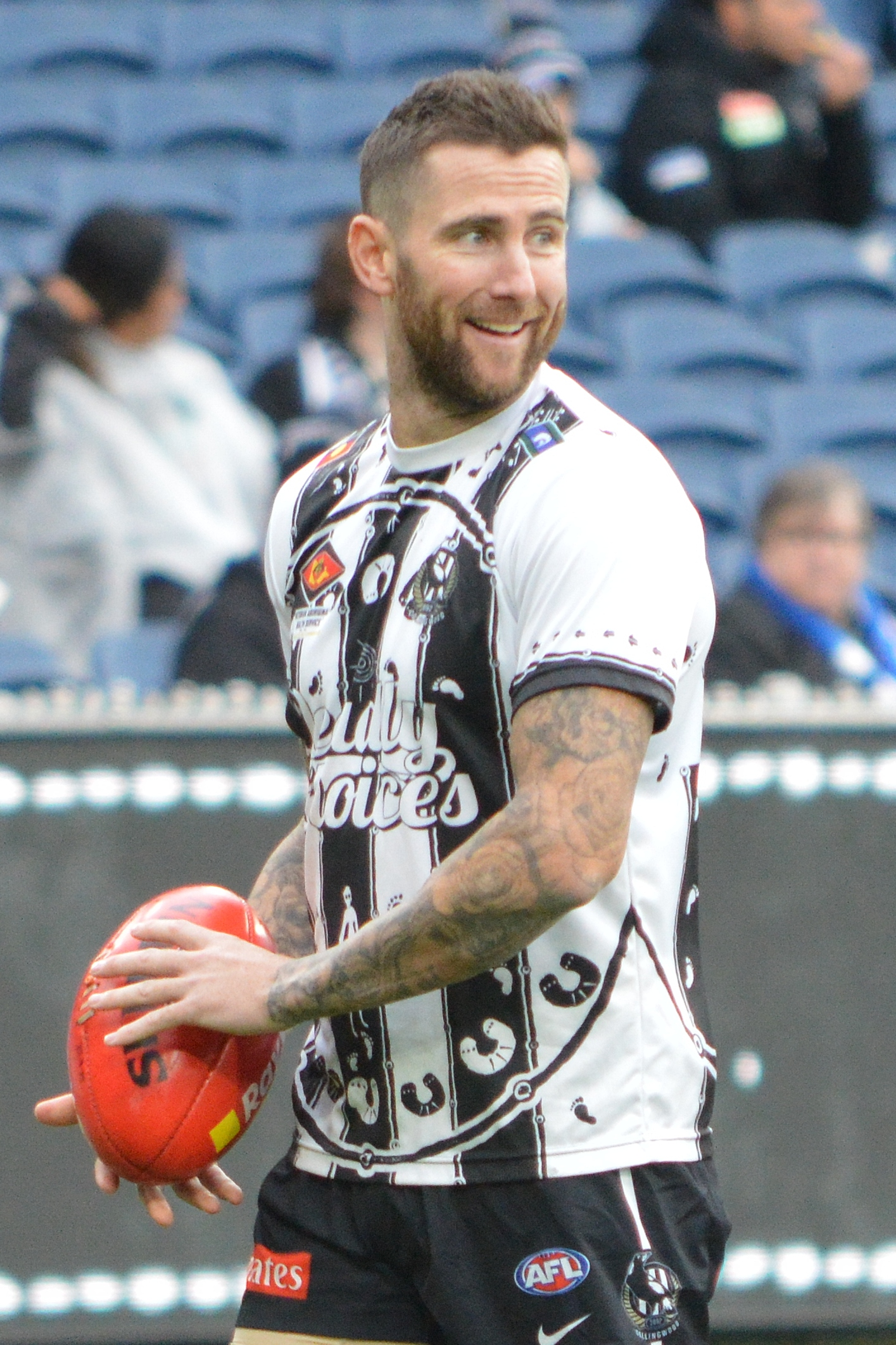
- Howe with Collingwood in May 2025

Personal information
- Full name: Jeremy Howe
- Nickname: Howey
- Born: 29 June 1990 (age 36); Hobart, Tasmania
- Original team: Dodges Ferry (SFL) / Hobart Tigers (TSL)
- Draft: No. 33, 2010 National Draft
- Debut: Round 11, 2011, Melbourne vs. Essendon, at MCG
- Height: 190 cm (6 ft 3 in)
- Weight: 86 kg (190 lb)
- Position: Key defender

Club information
- Current club: Collingwood
- Number: 38

Playing career^{1}
Years	Club	Games (Goals)
2011–2015	Melbourne	100 (80)
2016−	Collingwood	189 (24)
Total		289 (104)

Representative team honours
Years	Team	Games (Goals)
2020	All Stars	1 (0)
- ^{1} Playing statistics correct to the end of the 2026 season.

Career highlights
- AFL premiership player: 2023; Melbourne leading goalkicker: 2013; Mark of the Year: 2012; 22under22 team: 2012; Harold Ball Memorial Trophy: 2011

Jeremy Howe (born 29 June 1990) is a professional Australian rules footballer playing for the Collingwood Football Club in the Australian Football League (AFL). He previously played for the Melbourne Football Club from 2011 to 2015.

== Career ==
Originally from Dodges Ferry in the Southern Football League, Howe represented Tasmania at the 2009 AFL National Under 18 Championships, but was not selected in the 2009 AFL draft. Howe also played some games for the Lauderdale Football Club in the 2009 season. The fourth-year electrical apprentice subsequently moved to Tasmanian Football League side Hobart for the 2010 season. A full-forward, Howe made an immediate impact for the Tigers, becoming well known for his bleached blonde hair and high-flying marks. A player with impressive kicking skills and a big leap, Howe was recruited by Melbourne with the 33rd selection in the 2010 AFL draft. His spectacular marking has drawn comparison with fellow Tasmanian and former Melbourne high-flyer, Russell Robertson.

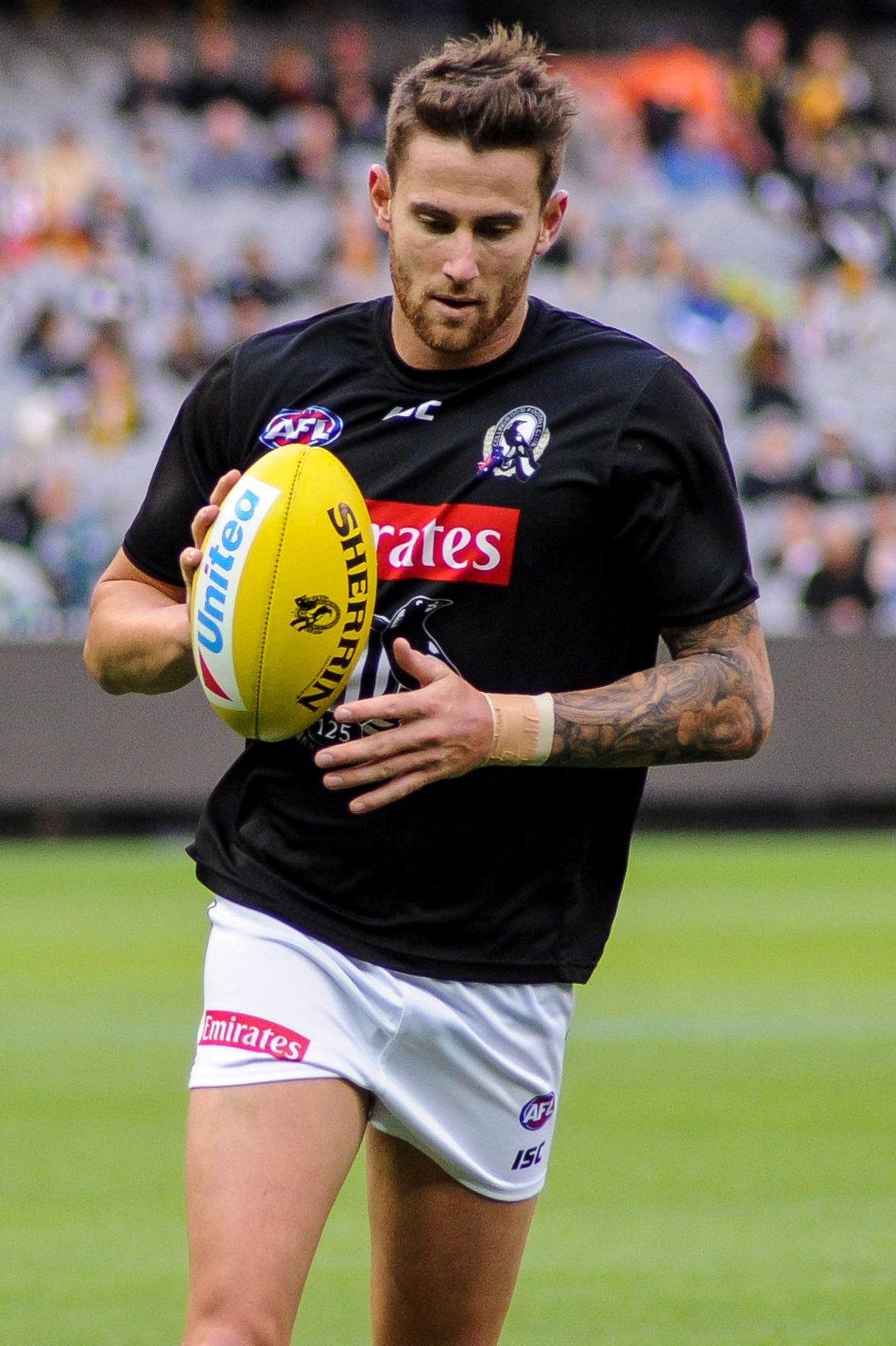
Howe in March 2017

Howe made his debut against Essendon in Round 11 of the 2011 AFL season. Gathering 19 disposals in an impressive debut, Howe kicked his first AFL goal with a "miraculous snap" in the third quarter, helping Melbourne to a 33-point victory. Howe is known for his high-flying and crowd-pleasing marks that light up the stadium. In 2012, he won the Mark of the Year award, an award for which he has had a league record 35 career nominations.

In October 2015, Howe was traded to the Collingwood Football Club.

During the first round of the 2023 AFL season Howe suffered an arm injury in the third quarter after attempting a mark, colliding with Tyson Stengle's back, and landing awkwardly. It was deemed too gruesome to be replayed or zoomed in on, and he was carried off the field in a stretcher and taken to hospital. Following the match it was revealed that he had broken his arm and would have to go surgery, sidelining him for an indefinite period. Howe returned to play in round 15, June 25, with his healed arm in a protective padded sleeve. In Round 22 of 2025, he was heavily concussed in a collision with Hawthorn player Jai Newcombe and was again carried off the field on a stretcher and taken to hospital.

== Personal life ==
Howe is the cousin of Australian and Tasmanian cricketer Matthew Wade. He attended Rose Bay High School in Hobart.

== Statistics ==
Updated to the end of round 22, 2026.

Legend
G	Goals	K	Kicks	D	Disposals	T	Tackles
B	Behinds	H	Handballs	M	Marks
#	Played in that season's premiership team

Season	Team	No.	Games	Totals							Averages (per game)							Votes
Season	Team	No.	Games	G	B	K	H	D	M	T	G	B	K	H	D	M	T	Votes
2011	Melbourne	38	13	18	8	100	61	161	70	20	1.4	0.6	7.7	4.7	12.4	5.4	1.5	1
2012	Melbourne	38	22	19	25	227	122	349	122	68	0.9	1.1	10.3	5.5	15.9	5.5	3.1	0
2013	Melbourne	38	21	28	16	187	97	284	120	27	1.3	0.8	8.9	4.6	13.5	5.7	1.3	0
2014	Melbourne	38	22	5	5	244	133	377	127	57	0.2	0.2	11.1	6.0	17.1	5.8	2.6	2
2015	Melbourne	38	22	10	11	198	115	313	111	57	0.5	0.5	9.0	5.2	14.2	5.0	2.6	3
2016	Collingwood	38	20	3	5	244	140	384	142	52	0.2	0.3	12.2	7.0	19.2	7.1	2.6	1
2017	Collingwood	38	21	3	2	294	164	458	181	33	0.1	0.1	14.0	7.8	21.8	8.6	1.6	0
2018	Collingwood	38	21	2	2	269	125	394	147	41	0.1	0.1	12.8	6.0	18.8	7.0	2.0	0
2019	Collingwood	38	21	1	0	268	96	364	142	30	0.0	0.0	12.8	4.6	17.3	6.8	1.4	0
2020 (Note: The 2020 season was played with 17 home-and-away matches per team (down from 22) and 16-minute quarters with time on (down from 20-minute quarters with time on) due to the impact of the COVID-19 pandemic.)	Collingwood	38	4	0	0	66	20	86	26	8	0.0	0.0	16.5	5.0	21.5	6.5	2.0	0
2021	Collingwood	38	8	1	0	98	41	139	46	19	0.1	0.0	12.3	5.1	17.4	5.8	2.4	0
2022	Collingwood	38	24	1	0	259	126	385	141	35	0.0	0.0	10.8	5.3	16.0	5.9	1.5	0
2023^{#}	Collingwood	38	14	7	1	144	60	204	84	26	0.5	0.1	10.3	4.3	14.6	6.0	1.9	0
2024	Collingwood	38	19	5	2	225	60	285	98	30	0.3	0.1	11.8	3.2	15.0	5.2	1.6	0
2025	Collingwood	38	19	0	0	193	45	238	79	23	0.0	0.0	10.2	2.4	12.5	4.2	1.2	2
2026	Collingwood	38	16	1	0	224	49	273	105	19	0.1	0.0	14.0	3.1	17.1	6.6	1.2	0
Career			287	104	77	3240	1454	4694	1741	545	0.4	0.3	11.3	5.1	16.4	6.1	1.9	9

== Honours and achievements ==
Individual

- Premiership Player 2023
- All Stars Representative Honours in Bushfire Relief Match: 2020
- AFL Mark of the Year: 2012
- Harold Ball Memorial Trophy (Melbourne Best First-Year Player): 2011
- Melbourne Leading Goalkicker: 2013 (28)
- 22under22 team: 2012
