= Luke Tapscott =

Australian rules footballer (born 1991)

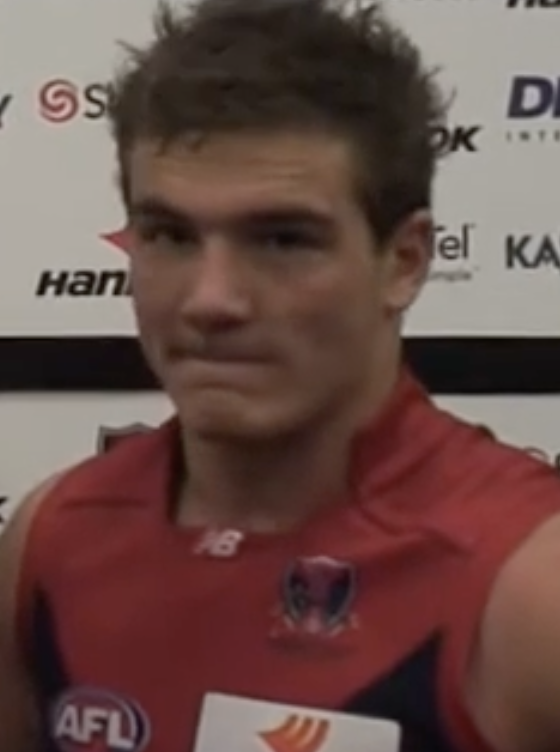
- Tapscott in March 2011

Personal information
- Full name: Luke Tapscott
- Nickname: Tappers
- Born: 28 June 1991 (age 35); Orroroo, South Australia
- Original team: North Adelaide (SANFL)
- Draft: 18th overall, 2009; Melbourne
- Height: 180 cm (5 ft 11 in)
- Weight: 86 kg (190 lb)
- Position: Utility

Playing career^{1}
Years	Club	Games (Goals)
2010–2014	Melbourne	48 (12)
2017-2021	Sorrento	78 (133)
2006-09	Nth Adelaide	33 (50)
2010-14	Casey Demons	29 (23)
2021	Orroroo	2 (2)
2016	MPNFL	1 (2)
2022-present	Chelsea Heights Demons	
- ^{1} Playing statistics correct to the end of 2014.

Career highlights
- SFC playing coach 2017-2021; SFC Best & Fairest 2016, 2017

Luke Tapscott (born 28 June 1991) is an Australian rules footballer who played for the Melbourne Football Club in the Australian Football League (AFL).

Tapscott started his football for Northern Areas Football Association club Orroroo before moving to Adelaide to attend Prince Alfred College and play football for North Adelaide Football Club. One of Tapscott's Prince Alfred friends was Jack Trengove, who later became his teammate at Melbourne.

He excelled through the ranks as a tough, built, young forward/midfielder with an exceptional penetrating kick, on both the left and right foot. After twice representing South Australia at the AFL Under 18 Championships and being named in the All Australian team, he was picked as the 18th overall pick in the 2009 AFL draft, by the Melbourne Football Club. At the time he was compared to 2009 AFL Rising Star winner Daniel Rich.

After injuring his hip in the 2010 pre-season, Tapscott missed most of the season and was unable to break into Melbourne's senior side when he did return, instead playing for Melbourne's VFL-affiliate Casey, before injuring his shoulder at the end of 2010. After an impressive 2011 pre-season, Tapscott made his AFL debut in Round One that year. Playing in a draw against Sydney, Tapscott played a "tremendous" match, gathering 19 disposals and narrowly missing out on being the AFL Rising Star nominee for round one to Essendon's Dyson Heppell, who would eventually claim the award at the end of the season.

Tapscott was delisted at the conclusion of the 2014 AFL season.

== Statistics ==
Statistics are correct to the end of the 2014 season

Legend
G	Goals	K	Kicks	D	Disposals	T	Tackles
B	Behinds	H	Handballs	M	Marks

Season	Team	No.	Games	Totals							Averages (per game)						
Season	Team	No.	Games	G	B	K	H	D	M	T	G	B	K	H	D	M	T
2010	Melbourne	35	0	—	—	—	—	—	—	—	—	—	—	—	—	—	—
2011	Melbourne	35	15	2	1	131	57	188	50	34	0.1	0.1	8.7	3.8	12.5	3.3	2.3
2012	Melbourne	35	14	2	4	100	56	156	54	48	0.1	0.3	7.1	4	12.1	3.9	3.4
2013	Melbourne	35	16	7	8	107	49	156	56	35	0.4	0.5	6.7	3.1	9.8	3.5	2.2
2014	Melbourne	35	3	1	3	19	12	31	4	6	0.3	1	6.3	4	10.3	1.3	2
Career			48	12	16	357	174	531	164	123	0.3	0.3	7.5	3.6	11.1	3.4	2.7
