= Cruize Garlett =

Australian rules footballer

Personal information
- Born: 6 March 1989 (age 37)
- Original team: Perth
- Height: 1.74 m (5 ft 9 in)
- Weight: 77 kg (170 lb)

Playing career^{1}
Years	Club	Games (Goals)
2008–2012	North Melbourne	32 (9)
- ^{1} Playing statistics correct to the end of 2012.

Cruize Garlett (born 6 March 1989) is an Australian rules footballer who played for North Melbourne in the Australian Football League (AFL) between 2009 and 2012.

== Playing career ==
=== Early career ===
Garlett played his early football for Railways in Northam before moving to Perth in the West Australian Football League. With Perth Garlett played six matches in 2007.

=== AFL career ===
As a result of his form for Perth Garlett was selected as a rookie by North Melbourne in the 2008 Rookie Draft.

He was delisted in October 2012.

=== Personal ===
He is the second cousin of Jeff Garlett of the Melbourne Football Club.
