= Neville Jetta =

Australian rules footballer

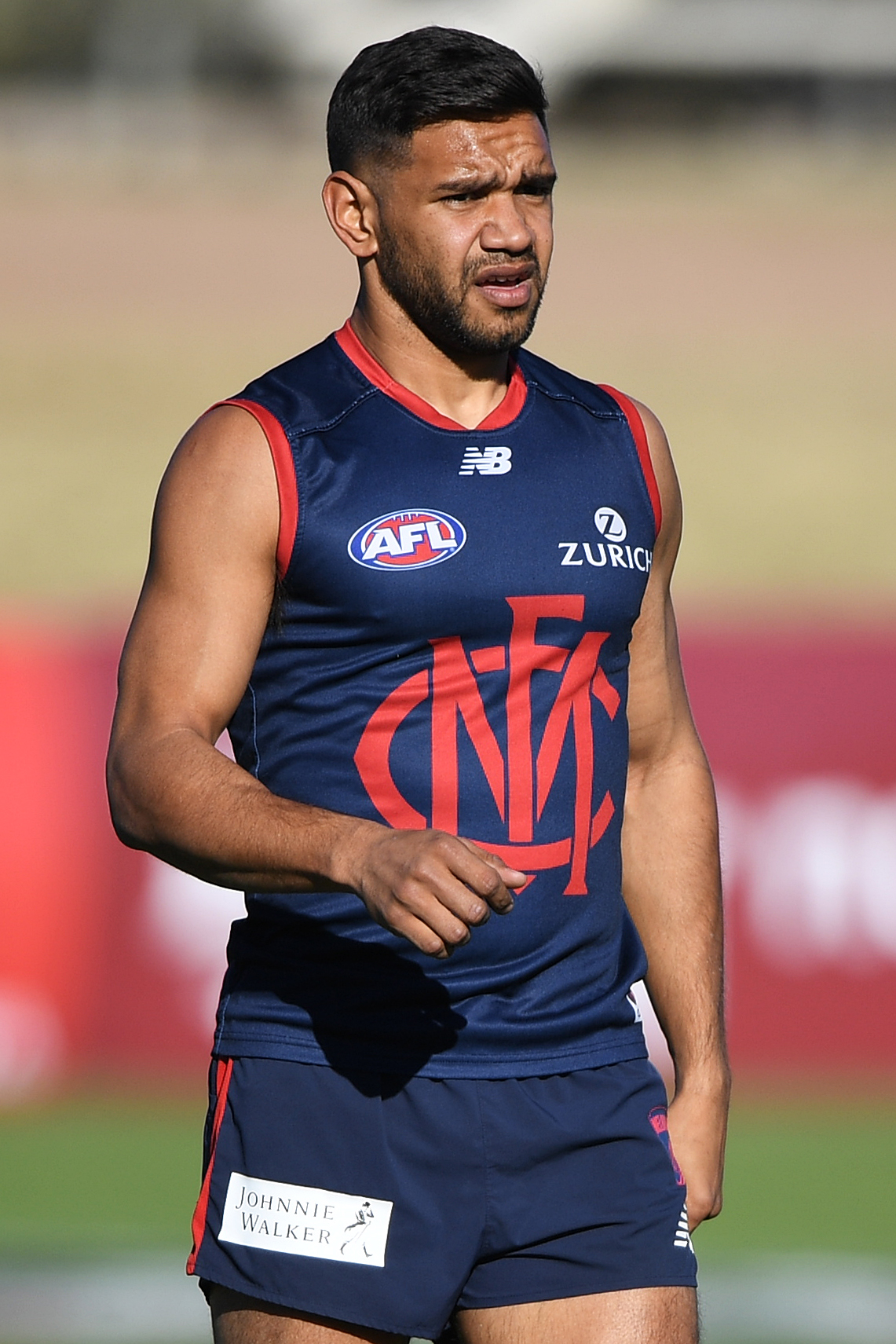
- Jetta with Melbourne in July 2019

Personal information
- Full name: Neville Jetta
- Nickname: Nev
- Born: 12 February 1990 (age 36); Bunbury, Western Australia
- Original team: Swan Districts (WAFL)
- Draft: No. 51, 2008 national draft
- Debut: Round 1, 2009, Melbourne vs. North Melbourne, at MCG
- Height: 180 cm (5 ft 11 in)
- Weight: 82 kg (181 lb)
- Position: Defender

Playing career^{1}
Years	Club	Games (Goals)
2009–2021	Melbourne	159 (24)

Representative team honours^{2}
Years	Team	Games (Goals)
2020	All-Stars	1 (0)

International team honours^{2}
2017	Australia	2 (0)

Coaching career
Years	Club	Games (W–L–D)
2025–	Fitzroy Stars (NFNL)	
- ^{1} Playing statistics correct to the end of round 15, 2021.^{2} Representative statistics correct as of 2017.

Career highlights
- Jim Stynes Community Leadership Award: 2018

Neville Jetta (born 12 February 1990) is a former Australian rules footballer who played for the Melbourne Football Club in the Australian Football League (AFL). He is the current senior coach of the Fitzroy Stars in the Northern Football Netball League (NFNL).

== Playing career ==
Jetta was drafted by Melbourne with the 51st selection in the 2008 national draft. He had previously been playing with Swan Districts in the West Australian Football League (WAFL). In September 2008 he was awarded the Mel Whinnen Medal for being the best player in the Swans colts grand final win.

Both Jetta and fellow Melbourne draftee Jamie Bennell come from Bunbury and attended the same primary school. Jetta is the cousin of Lewis Jetta of the West Coast Eagles and also a distant cousin of Leroy Jetta, who played for Essendon.

Jetta and Bennell were both named to make their AFL debuts together in the opening round of the 2009 AFL season.

During the 2013 AFL season, Jetta fell out of favour at the Demons, playing only five games due to form and being unable to find a permanent position. This led to Jetta being delisted at the season's end. Due to the appointment of Paul Roos as senior coach, Jetta was provided with another chance and was redrafted as a rookie for the 2014 AFL season.

During the 2014 AFL season, Jetta was promoted to the senior list due to injuries to Jesse Hogan and Mitch Clark. Jetta cemented a spot in Melbourne's back six where he arguably played the best football of his career playing as a small defender, successfully negating small forwards such as Eddie Betts, Chad Wingard and Luke Dahlhaus.

In 2018, Jetta was awarded the Jim Stynes Community Leadership Award for his work supporting Indigenous youth through various school-based programs as well as his ambassador roles with Red Cross and Headspace.

Neville was the first Melbourne Football Club player to win the Jim Stynes Community Leadership Award, named in memory of Melbourne great Jim Stynes.

On 27 September 2021, Jetta announced his retirement from the AFL.

== Coaching career ==
Following his retirement as a player, Jetta joined Collingwood as a development coach.

On 8 October 2024, he was announced as the senior men's coach of the Fitzroy Stars Football Club for the 2025 Northern Football Netball League (NFNL) season.

== Statistics ==
Statistics are correct to the end of round 15, 2021

Legend
G	Goals	K	Kicks	D	Disposals	T	Tackles
B	Behinds	H	Handballs	M	Marks

Season	Team	No.	Games	Totals							Averages (per game)						
Season	Team	No.	Games	G	B	K	H	D	M	T	G	B	K	H	D	M	T
2009	Melbourne	39	15	7	8	115	64	179	43	39	0.5	0.5	7.7	4.3	11.9	2.9	2.6
2010	Melbourne	39	6	6	1	47	36	83	15	26	1.0	0.2	7.8	6.0	13.8	2.5	4.3
2011	Melbourne	39	9	5	3	56	64	120	34	42	0.6	0.3	6.2	7.1	13.3	3.8	4.7
2012	Melbourne	39	6	1	0	39	21	60	21	15	0.2	0.0	6.5	3.5	10.0	3.5	2.5
2013	Melbourne	39	5	0	1	26	18	44	9	20	0.0	0.2	5.2	3.6	8.8	1.8	4.0
2014	Melbourne	39	16	1	0	100	108	208	50	60	0.1	0.0	6.3	6.8	13.0	3.1	3.8
2015	Melbourne	39	16	1	0	76	116	192	43	41	0.1	0.0	4.7	7.3	12.0	2.7	2.6
2016	Melbourne	39	21	0	3	163	172	335	78	63	0.0	0.1	7.8	8.2	16.0	3.7	3.0
2017	Melbourne	39	22	3	0	151	164	315	94	68	0.1	0.0	6.9	7.5	14.4	4.3	3.1
2018	Melbourne	39	25	0	1	142	155	297	75	79	0.0	0.0	5.7	6.2	11.9	3.0	3.2
2019	Melbourne	39	7	0	0	39	36	75	19	20	0.0	0.0	5.6	5.1	10.7	2.7	2.9
2020 (Note: The 2020 season was played with 17 home-and-away matches per team (down from 22) and 16-minute quarters with time on (down from 20-minute quarters with time on) due to the impact of the COVID-19 pandemic.)	Melbourne	39	6	0	0	14	23	37	6	8	0.0	0.0	2.3	3.8	6.2	1.0	1.3
2021	Melbourne	39	5	0	0	20	20	40	13	7	0.0	0.0	4.0	4.0	8.0	2.6	1.4
Career			159	24	17	988	997	1985	500	487	0.2	0.1	6.2	6.3	12.5	3.1	3.1

== Personal life ==
Jetta has a daughter and a son. He married his partner Samantha on 20 October 2013.
