= 2012 NAB Cup =

- Season: 2012
- Teams: 18
- Winners: Adelaide (2nd title)
- Matches played: 44
- Attendance: 493,982 (average 11,227 per match)
- Michael Tuck Medallist: Bernie Vince (Adelaide)

The 2012 NAB Cup was the Australian Football League (AFL) pre-season competition played before the 2012 home-and-away season. The games were played between 17 February and 18 March 2012.

The competition format was changed for the second consecutive season, although the format was similar to that used in the previous year. As part of this year's competition, the NAB Regional Challenge was dissolved, with live matches to be staged at both regular AFL venues and select regional centres.

The format for the 2012 NAB Cup was as follows:

- Weeks 1 and 2: (Round 1 is split over weeks 1 and 2) The eighteen teams were split into six pools of three teams each. The three teams in each pool played each other in games of two 20-minute halves, with all three games being played over a three-hour period at the one venue.
- Weeks 3 and 4: (Round 2 and 3) The eighteen teams played a full length match each week in either metropolitan or regional areas.
- Week 5: (Round 4) The two best ranked teams played in the NAB Cup Grand Final. The other sixteen teams will play a full length practice match in either metropolitan or regional areas.

== Games ==
The fixtures were announced by the AFL on 26 October 2011, while the playing order of first-round games were announced by the AFL on 23 January 2012.

=== Round 1 ===
	Pool 1
Friday, 17 February (6:45 pm)	Richmond 0.6.5 (41)	def. by	North Melbourne 0.7.2 (44)	Etihad Stadium (crowd: 28,228)	Report
Friday, 17 February (7:50 pm)	North Melbourne 0.4.4 (28)	def. by	Hawthorn 1.6.8 (53)	Etihad Stadium (crowd: 28,228)	Report
Friday, 17 February (8:55 pm)	Hawthorn 0.5.7 (37)	def. by	Richmond 0.6.4 (40)	Etihad Stadium (crowd: 28,228)	Report

	Pool 2
Saturday, 18 February (7:15 pm)	Greater Western Sydney 1.3.3 (30)	def. by	Western Bulldogs 0.5.5 (35)	Blacktown Olympic Park (crowd: 7,086)	Report
Saturday, 18 February (8:20 pm)	Western Bulldogs 0.3.1 (19)	def. by	Collingwood 0.4.2 (26)	Blacktown Olympic Park (crowd: 7,086)	Report
Saturday, 18 February (9:25 pm)	Collingwood 0.5.5 (35)	def.	Greater Western Sydney 0.5.2 (32)	Blacktown Olympic Park (crowd: 7,086)	Report

	Pool 3
Sunday, 19 February (4:45 pm)	West Coast 0.9.3 (57)	def.	Essendon 0.5.6 (36)	Patersons Stadium (crowd: 27,581)	Report
Sunday, 19 February (5:50 pm)	Essendon 0.3.2 (20)	def. by	Fremantle 1.7.5 (56)	Patersons Stadium (crowd: 27,581)	Report
Sunday, 19 February (6:55 pm)	Fremantle 0.1.4 (10)	def. by	West Coast 0.4.6 (30)	Patersons Stadium (crowd: 27,581)	Report

	Pool 4
Friday, 24 February (6:40 pm)	St Kilda 0.4.5 (29)	def. by	Sydney 0.9.5 (59)	Etihad Stadium (crowd: 18,880)	Report
Friday, 24 February (7:45 pm)	Sydney 0.2.1 (13)	def. by	Geelong 0.4.5 (29)	Etihad Stadium (crowd: 18,880)	Report
Friday, 24 February (8:50 pm)	St Kilda 1.3.9 (36)	def.	Geelong 1.0.6 (15)	Etihad Stadium (crowd: 18,880)	Report

	Pool 5
Saturday, 25 February (6:10 pm)	Gold Coast 0.4.2 (26)	def.	Melbourne 0.3.5 (23)	Metricon Stadium (crowd: 5,150)	Report
Saturday, 25 February (7:15 pm)	Melbourne 0.2.1 (13)	def.	Brisbane Lions 0.1.4 (10)	Metricon Stadium (crowd: 5,150)	Report
Saturday, 25 February (8:20 pm)	Brisbane Lions 0.2.6 (18)	def.	Gold Coast 0.2.4 (16)	Metricon Stadium (crowd: 5,150)	Report

	Pool 6
Sunday, 26 February (2:40 pm)	Port Adelaide 0.6.10 (46)	def.	Carlton 1.5.1 (40)	AAMI Stadium (crowd: 12,532)	Report
Sunday, 26 February (3:45 pm)	Carlton 0.5.4 (34)	def. by	Adelaide 1.5.4 (43)	AAMI Stadium (crowd: 12,532)	Report
Sunday, 26 February (4:50 pm)	Adelaide 0.2.6 (18)	def.	Port Adelaide 0.2.5 (17)	AAMI Stadium (crowd: 12,532)	Report

=== Round 2 ===
	Round 2
Friday, 2 March (7:40 pm)	Gold Coast 1.8.12 (69)	def. by	Geelong 1.16.13 (118)	Metricon Stadium (crowd: 5,381)	Report
Saturday, 3 March (3:40 pm)	Hawthorn 2.12.18 (108)	def.	Greater Western Sydney 0.4.10 (34)	Aurora Stadium (crowd: 5,100)	Report
Saturday, 3 March (cancelled)	Essendon	v	St Kilda	Wangaratta Showgrounds	Report
Saturday, 3 March (7:00 pm)	Sydney 2.9.10 (82)	def.	North Melbourne 0.9.11 (65)	Bruce Purser Reserve, Sydney (crowd: 2,024)	Report
Saturday, 3 March (4:10 pm)	West Coast 1.12.11 (92)	def.	Port Adelaide 1.12.6 (87)	Bendigo Bank Stadium, Mandurah (crowd: 9,000)	Report
Saturday, 3 March (7:40 pm)	Collingwood 1.9.7 (70)	def. by	Melbourne 0.11.13 (79)	Etihad Stadium (crowd: 12,954)	Report
Saturday, 3 March (7:10 pm)	Adelaide 0.14.9 (93)	def.	Brisbane Lions 1.5.3 (42)	Traeger Park, Alice Springs (crowd: 4,756)	Report
Sunday, 4 March (5:40 pm)	Western Bulldogs 0.11.8 (74)	def.	Carlton 0.11.4 (70)	Etihad Stadium (crowd: 10,500)	Report
Sunday, 4 March (5:10 pm)	Fremantle 1.14.12 (105)	def.	Richmond 0.10.7 (67)	Patersons Stadium (crowd: 7,294)	Report
The match between Essendon and St Kilda was cancelled because heavy rain in northern Victoria prevented the flights chartered by the Essendon Football Club from landing in or near Wangaratta. The decision by Essendon to fly, in the face of adverse weather forecasts well out from the date of the game, was criticised by many, including Victorian Minister for Sport Hugh Delahunty. After initially treating the result as a draw, the AFL awarded the full four points to St Kilda, who had travelled to Wangaratta by bus the previous day. The cancellation was a disappointment for the people of Wangaratta; the match, which had been sold out in advance, was a major event in the area; St Kilda played an intraclub match for the crowd that stayed, and the city received financial compensation from the league for the cancellation.

=== Round 3 ===
	Round 3
Friday, 9 March (6:10 pm)	Essendon 1.14.12 (105)	def.	Sydney 1.14.10 (103)	Etihad Stadium (crowd: 12,000)	Report
Friday, 9 March (8:10 pm)	Adelaide 1.20.9 (138)	def.	Collingwood 1.7.10 (61)	AAMI Stadium (crowd: 12,062)	Report
Saturday, 10 March (3:10 pm)	Geelong 0.6.13 (49)	def. by	Richmond 1.14.15 (108)	Simonds Stadium (crowd: 9,393)	Report
Saturday, 10 March (3:40 pm)	Port Adelaide 1.11.11 (86)	def.	Fremantle 2.5.18 (66)	Encounter Bay Oval, Victor Harbor (crowd: 5,000)	Report
Saturday, 10 March (3:40 pm)	Brisbane Lions 0.15.14 (104)	def.	Carlton 0.6.4 (40)	Maroochydore Multi Sports Complex (crowd: 5,147)	Report
Saturday, 10 March (5:30 pm)	Greater Western Sydney 0.11.10 (76)	def.	Gold Coast 1.8.6 (63)	Lavington Sports Ground, Albury (crowd: 6,740)	Report
Saturday, 10 March (5:40 pm)	Melbourne 0.6.8 (44)	def. by	Hawthorn 1.17.12 (123)	Etihad Stadium (crowd: 10,611)	Report
Saturday, 10 March (5:10 pm)	West Coast 1.10.16 (85)	def.	St Kilda 0.7.10 (52)	Patersons Stadium (crowd: 9,411)	Report
Sunday, 11 March (3:40 pm)	North Melbourne 1.11.18 (93)	def.	Western Bulldogs 0.9.16 (70)	Eureka Stadium, Ballarat (crowd: 8,000)	Report
Greater Western Sydney won its first competitive AFL match.

=== Grand Final ===
2012 NAB Cup Grand Final
Saturday, 17 March (7:10 pm)	Adelaide	def.	West Coast	AAMI Stadium (crowd: 27,376)	Report
0.2.2 (14); 1.3.6 (33); 2.6.13 (67); 2.10.17 (95)	Q1; Q2; Q3; Final	2.0.2 (20); 2.1.6 (30); 2.4.7 (49); 2.5.13 (61)	Umpires: McBurney, McInerney, Mollison, Dalgleish; Michael Tuck Medal: Bernie Vince; Television broadcast: Seven Network / Fox Footy
Jaensch, Walker	Super Goals	Hill, Nicoski
Walker 2, Callinan, Jacobs, Mackay, Petrenko, Porplyzia, Thompson, Tippett, Vince	Goals	Darling, Hams, Hill, Priddis, Weedon
Vince, Thompson, Dangerfield, Walker, Reilly, Mackay	Best	Priddis, S.Selwood, Butler, Hill, Waters
Nil	Injuries	Nicoski (hamstring)

== NAB Challenge ==
	NAB Challenge
Friday, 16 March (4:00 pm)	Collingwood 10.20 (80)	def.	St Kilda 6.11 (47)	Visy Park (crowd: 3,000)	Report
Friday, 16 March (7:10 pm)	Port Adelaide 17.10 (112)	def.	Melbourne 9.10 (64)	AAMI Stadium (crowd: 2,500)	Report
Friday, 16 March (6:00 pm)	Fremantle 12.11 (83)	def. by	Hawthorn 13.8 (86)	Patersons Stadium (crowd: 5,316)	Report
Saturday, 17 March (12:30 pm)	Greater Western Sydney 10.6 (66)	def. by	Richmond 20.20 (140)	Manuka Oval (crowd: 4,222)	Report
Saturday, 17 March (1:00 pm)	Sydney 14.19 (103)	def.	Gold Coast 13.6 (84)	Blacktown Olympic Park (crowd: 741)	Report
Saturday, 17 March (3:00 pm)	Geelong 11.18 (84)	def.	Western Bulldogs 11.9 (75)	Simonds Stadium (crowd: 3,800)	Report
Saturday, 17 March (3:30 pm)	Essendon 16.16 (112)	def.	Brisbane Lions 8.8 (56)	Visy Park (crowd: 3,500)	Report
Sunday, 18 March (1:00 pm)	Carlton 15.10 (100)	def. by	North Melbourne 18.8 (116)	Visy Park (crowd: 9,783)	Report
These matches, played on the same weekend as the Grand Final, were not counted towards the NAB Cup ladder.

== Ladder ==
2012 NAB Cup Ladder
Pos	Team	Pld	W	L	D	PF	PA	PP	Pts	
1	Adelaide	4	4	0	0	292	154	189.6	16	Grand Final
2	West Coast	4	4	0	0	264	185	142.7	16	Grand Final
3	Hawthorn	4	3	1	0	321	146	219.9	12	
4	Fremantle	4	2	2	0	237	203	116.7	8	
5	Sydney	4	2	2	0	257	228	112.7	8	
6	Port Adelaide	4	2	2	0	236	216	109.3	8	
7	Richmond	4	2	2	0	256	235	108.9	8	
8	Brisbane Lions	4	2	2	0	174	162	107.4	8	
9	North Melbourne	4	2	2	0	230	246	93.5	8	
10	Geelong	4	2	2	0	211	226	93.4	8	
11	Western Bulldogs	4	2	2	0	198	219	90.4	8	
12	St Kilda	4	2	2	0	118	159	74.2	8	
13	Collingwood	4	2	2	0	192	268	71.6	8	
14	Melbourne	4	2	2	0	159	229	69.4	8	
15	Essendon	4	1	3	0	161	217	74.2	4	
16	Gold Coast	4	1	3	0	174	235	74.0	4	
17	Greater Western Sydney	4	1	3	0	172	241	71.4	4	
18	Carlton	4	0	4	0	184	267	68.9	0	

Source: NAB Cup AFL Ladder
Rules for classification: 1) points; 2) percentage; 3) number of points for.

== See also ==
- 2012 AFL season
