= Daniel Nicholson =

Australian rules footballer

Personal information
- Full name: Daniel Nicholson
- Born: 2 November 1990 (age 36); Derrinallum, Victoria
- Original teams: University Blues, East Ballarat
- Draft: 14th overall, 2011 Rookie Draft
- Height: 181;cm
- Weight: 78 kg (172 lb)
- Position: Half back flank

Playing career^{1}
Years	Club	Games (Goals)
2011–2014	Melbourne	32 (4)
- ^{1} Playing statistics correct to the end of 2014.

Daniel Nicholson (born 2 November 1990) is an Australian rules footballer who played with the Melbourne Football Club in the Australian Football League (AFL) and their affiliate club, Casey Scorpions in the Victorian Football League.

He made his debut against Carlton in round 10 of the 2011 AFL season. Nicholson started the game as a substitute and was brought on in the third quarter, in place of Matthew Warnock. Nicholson was retained in the side for the following game and was the substitute again. He replaced Colin Sylvia in the second quarter.

Nicholson plays on the half back flank as a rebounding defender and is noted for his leg speed and endurance.

Nicholson was delisted by the Demons at the conclusion of the 2014 season. He played only one senior game in his final year with the club.

He studied sports therapy and injury prevention at university. Now at home town Port Fairy he leads the Seagulls in the Hampden Football Netball League.

== Statistics ==
Legend
G	Goals	K	Kicks	D	Disposals	T	Tackles
B	Behinds	H	Handballs	M	Marks

Season	Team	No.	Games	Totals							Averages (per game)						
Season	Team	No.	Games	G	B	K	H	D	M	T	G	B	K	H	D	M	T
2011	Melbourne	49	9	2	1	64	52	116	24	32	0.2	0.1	7.1	5.8	12.9	2.7	3.6
2012	Melbourne	26	11	0	3	116	87	203	57	27	0.0	0.3	10.5	7.9	18.5	5.2	2.5
2013	Melbourne	26	11	2	6	90	65	155	48	38	0.2	0.5	8.2	5.9	14.1	4.4	3.5
2014	Melbourne	26	1	0	0	4	5	9	4	4	0.0	0.0	4.0	5.0	9.0	4.0	4.0
Career			32	4	10	274	209	483	134	101	0.1	0.3	8.6	6.5	15.1	4.2	3.2
