= Jamie Elliott =

Australian rules footballer

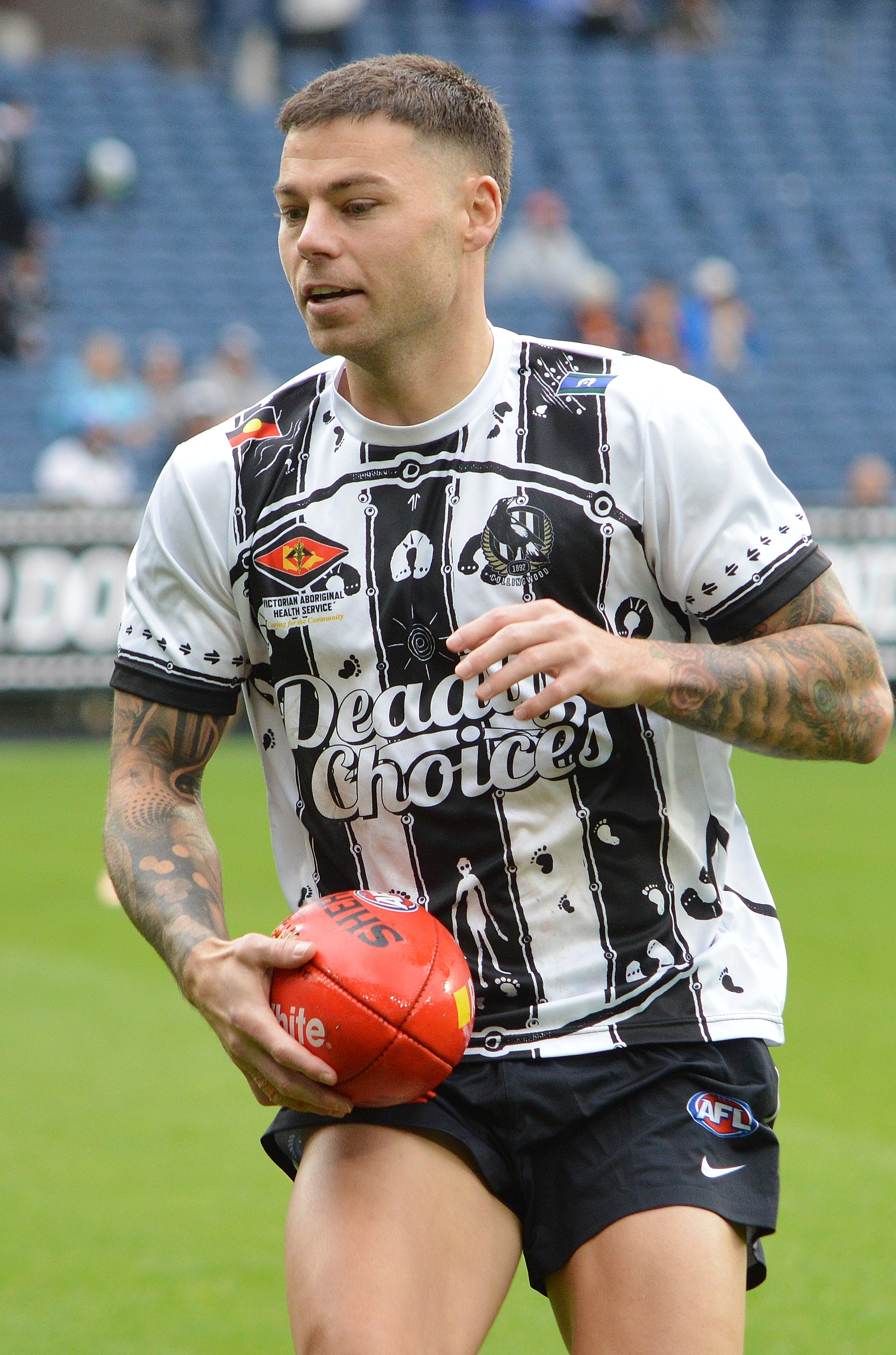
- Elliott in May 2025

Personal information
- Full name: Jamie William Elliott
- Nickname: Billy
- Born: 21 August 1992 (age 34); Lorne, Victoria
- Original team: Murray Bushrangers (TAC Cup)
- Height: 177 cm (5 ft 10 in)
- Weight: 83 kg (183 lb)
- Position: Forward

Club information
- Current club: Collingwood
- Number: 5

Playing career^{1}
Years	Club	Games (Goals)
2012–	Collingwood	230 (364)
- ^{1} Playing statistics correct to the end of the 2026 season.

Career highlights
- AFL premiership player: 2023; 3× Collingwood leading goalkicker: 2015, 2017, 2025; Harry Collier Trophy: 2012; Mark of the Year: 2013; 22under22 team: 2014

Jamie William Elliott (born 21 August 1992) is a professional Australian rules footballer playing for the Collingwood Football Club in the Australian Football League (AFL).

== Early life ==
Elliott was born in Lorne, Victoria to mother Fiona and father Gary and moved with his family to Dongara, Western Australia at two years of age. At 10 years old, he relocated to Queensland to be closer to his father, who would die several years later when Elliott was 13 years old. While in Queensland, Elliott developed a passion for Australian rules football and played at the local level for the Andergrove Kangaroos while also supporting the Brisbane Lions. He moved to Euroa, Victoria in his teenage years and some of his family members returned to Queensland years later.

Elliott played the majority of his junior football at the Euroa Football Club, playing his first senior matches there in 2009. In 2010 he played for the Murray Bushrangers in the TAC Cup. In 2011 he nominated for the AFL Draft. He represented Victoria Country at the 2011 AFL Under 18 Championships. In his draft year he was invited to play two games for Collingwood in the Victorian Football League (VFL). His performances during the year saw him pre-listed by Greater Western Sydney as one of 10 players as part of an AFL deal to on-trade players to other AFL clubs in exchange for draft picks. As part of this deal Elliott was traded to Collingwood at the end of 2011.

== AFL career ==
Elliot made his debut for Collingwood in round 9, 2012, against Adelaide at AAMI Stadium.

In round 2, 2013, he set three career bests, kicking five goals, taking ten marks and sixteen kicks in a 17-point comeback win over Carlton.

Elliott had a good start to the 2014 season, but later in the year he was restricted by a recurring hamstring injury. During March of that year he was diagnosed with hamstring tendinitis.

Elliott kicked 35 goals in 2015, making him Collingwood’s most prolific goalkicker. He missed the 2016 season, due to back surgery.

He played 17 games and kicked 34 goals during the 2017 season, but missed the 2018 season due to ankle surgery.

Elliott played 16 games in 2019, and was the subject of extensive rumours that he would be traded from Collingwood, with Melbourne, Hawthorn, the Western Bulldogs, and North Melbourne all being cited as potential destinations. Ultimately, Elliott decided to remain at Collingwood.

In Round 19 of 2022 Elliott kicked a goal after the siren from the boundary line to win the game for Collingwood against the Essendon Bombers. 4 weeks later in Round 23, the final round of the home and away season, Elliott won the game for his team again, kicking a last minute goal against the Carlton Blues after coming back from 4 goals down at three-quarter time. This goal sealing Collingwood's position in the top 4, also knocking arch rivals Carlton Blues out of the finals.

In 2025, Elliott had a career best year, kicking 60 goals in 25 games and winning the Collingwood Leading Goalkicker Award for the third time in his career and being named in the All-Australian squad.

== Statistics ==
Updated to the end of round 22, 2026.

Legend
G	Goals	K	Kicks	D	Disposals	T	Tackles
B	Behinds	H	Handballs	M	Marks
#	Played in that season's premiership team

Season	Team	No.	Games	Totals							Averages (per game)							Votes
Season	Team	No.	Games	G	B	K	H	D	M	T	G	B	K	H	D	M	T	Votes
2012	Collingwood	35	15	6	11	99	55	154	57	62	0.4	0.7	6.6	3.7	10.3	3.8	4.1	0
2013	Collingwood	19	20	30	16	152	99	251	90	58	1.5	0.8	7.6	5.0	12.6	4.5	2.9	3
2014	Collingwood	19	17	33	11	190	66	256	101	60	1.9	0.6	11.2	3.9	15.1	5.9	3.5	6
2015	Collingwood	5	20	35	14	202	87	289	111	63	1.8	0.7	10.1	4.4	14.5	5.6	3.2	3
2016	Collingwood	5	0	—	—	—	—	—	—	—	—	—	—	—	—	—	—	0
2017	Collingwood	5	17	34	16	163	76	239	103	38	2.0	0.9	9.6	4.5	14.1	6.1	2.2	1
2018	Collingwood	5	0	—	—	—	—	—	—	—	—	—	—	—	—	—	—	0
2019	Collingwood	5	16	26	18	144	47	191	89	37	1.6	1.1	9.0	2.9	11.9	5.6	2.3	5
2020 (Note: The 2020 season was played with 17 home-and-away matches per team (down from 22) and 16-minute quarters with time on (down from 20-minute quarters with time on) due to the impact of the COVID-19 pandemic.)	Collingwood	5	18	10	10	141	86	227	51	57	0.6	0.6	7.8	4.8	12.6	2.8	3.2	0
2021	Collingwood	5	13	25	8	127	73	200	61	32	1.9	0.6	9.8	5.6	15.4	4.7	2.5	3
2022	Collingwood	5	19	28	19	172	93	265	72	66	1.5	1.0	9.1	4.9	13.9	3.8	3.5	3
2023^{#}	Collingwood	5	24	39	28	170	101	271	110	70	1.6	1.2	7.1	4.2	11.3	4.6	2.9	5
2024	Collingwood	5	15	21	16	125	72	197	59	36	1.4	1.1	8.3	4.8	13.1	3.9	2.4	3
2025	Collingwood	5	25	60	30	206	96	302	127	57	2.4	1.2	8.2	3.8	12.1	5.1	2.3	9
2026	Collingwood	5	11	17	7	73	57	130	39	16	1.5	0.6	6.6	5.2	11.8	3.5	1.5	0
Career			230	364	204	1964	1008	2972	1070	652	1.6	0.9	8.5	4.4	12.9	4.7	2.8	41

== Honours and achievements ==
Team

- AFL premiership player: 2023
- AFL minor premiership: 2023

Individual

- 3× Collingwood Leading Goalkicker Award: 2015 (35), 2017 (34), 2025 (60)
- AFL Mark of the Year: 2013
- 22under22 team: 2014
- Harry Collier Trophy (Collingwood Best Young Player Award): 2012
