= Jamie Bennell =

Australian rules footballer

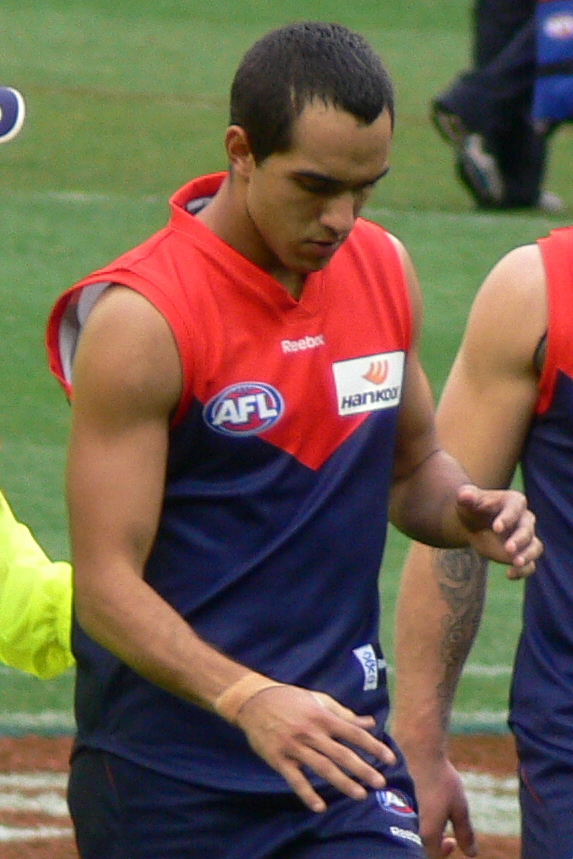
- Bennell with Melbourne in 2009

Personal information
- Full name: Jamie Graham Bennell
- Nickname: JB
- Born: 7 June 1989 (age 37); Bunbury, Western Australia
- Original team: Carey Park (SWFL)
- Draft: 35th pick, 2008 National draft (MEL); 26th pick, 2013 Rookie draft (WCE)
- Height: 179 cm (5 ft 10 in)
- Weight: 75 kg (165 lb)
- Position: Small forward

Playing career^{1}
Years	Club	Games (Goals)
2009–2012	Melbourne	57 (23)
2013–2016	West Coast	30 (3)
Total		87 (26)
- ^{1} Playing statistics correct to the end of 2016.

Jamie Graham Bennell (born 7 June 1990) is a former professional Australian rules footballer who played for the Melbourne Football Club and the West Coast Eagles in the Australian Football League (AFL). Originally from Bunbury, Western Australia, he was recruited by Melbourne in the 2008 National draft, and played 57 games for the club before being delisted at the end of the 2012 AFL season. He was then redrafted by West Coast in the 2013 Rookie draft, and played an additional 30 games before again being delisted at the end of the 2016 season.

== Career ==
Bennell is from Bunbury, Western Australia, where he attended Bunbury Senior High School. Originally playing for the Carey Park Football Club in the South West Football League (SWFL), he played colts for the Swan Districts Football Club before being selected by Melbourne in the third round at pick 35 in the 2008 National draft. He had previously been playing with Swan Districts in the West Australian Football League. Bennell was named to make his debut for Melbourne in the opening round of the 2009 AFL season together with Neville Jetta, who also played for Swan Districts and played alongside Bennell since primary school in Bunbury, Western Australia

Bennell played predominantly across half-back during his debut season for the Demons, usually manning opposition small forwards, and playing a total of 16 games. The following season saw Bennell move into attack as a small crumbing forward, earning both mark and goal of the year nominations against the Western Bulldogs in round 7. The following fortnight Bennell had a career best four-goal game against Port Adelaide Football Club, his form however began to taper off towards the end of the season as he was dropped for round 22. At the end of the 2012 season, Bennell was delisted. He had suffered a serious knee injury towards the end of the season, when playing against the Fremantle Football Club. In the 2013 Rookie draft, held in December 2012, he was re-drafted by West Coast with the 26th pick overall.

Bennell was delisted by West Coast at the end of the 2016 AFL season, having managed only two games during that season.

Bennell joined Hawthorn as its Indigenous Player Development Manager in 2023, and designed the club's Indigenous Round guernsey in 2025.
