= 2008 Melbourne Football Club season =

Melbourne Football Club
2008 season
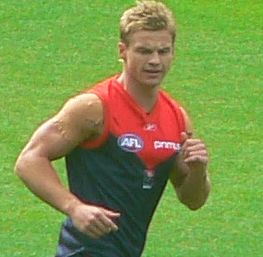
- Colin Sylvia during the 2008 season
- President: Paul Gardiner^{(6th season)}^{(to 9 June)} Jim Stynes^{(from 12 June)}
- Coach: Dean Bailey^{(1st season)}
- Captains: David Neitz^{(9th season)}^{(rounds 1–5)} James McDonald^{(1st season)}^{(rounds 6–22)} Cameron Bruce^{(1st season)}^{(rounds 6–22)}
- Home ground: MCG^{(100,018 capacity)}
- Pre-season: First round
- AFL season: 16th
- Finals series: DNQ
- Best and fairest: Cameron Bruce
- Leading goalkicker: Brad Miller^{(26 goals)}
- Highest home attendance: 59,548^{(round 11 vs. Collingwood)}
- Lowest home attendance: 11,437^{(round 13 vs. Sydney)}
- Average home attendance: 30,777
- Club membership: 29,619^{(▲1,542 / ▲5.49%)}

The 2008 Melbourne Football Club season was the club's 109th year in the VFL/AFL.

In conjunction with the AFL celebrating 150 years since the sport of Australian rules football was first created, the Melbourne Football Club also celebrated its 150th anniversary since its foundation in 1858. This included the celebration of their "150 Heroes", which commemorated the 150 greatest contributing players to ever play for Melbourne. Despite the celebrations, the Demons were tarnished by major on and off field disasters that led to the resignation of Paul Gardiner as chairman of the club and installation of Jim Stynes midway through the season. During August, Jim Stynes attempted to eliminate Melbourne of its major debt with a program called "Debt Demolition".

Melbourne hosted 10 of its 11 games at the MCG, which included its first "home game" against the Brisbane Lions outside of the Gabba since 2000. They also played a home game at Manuka Oval in the nation's capital Canberra against the Sydney Swans during Round 13. Dean Bailey coached his first year as senior coach at Melbourne. David Neitz captained his ninth year for the Demons, however after aggravating a disc in his neck during the Round 5 clash against Carlton, he announced his retirement on 19 May. For the remainder of the year, the captaincy was shared between Cameron Bruce and James McDonald.

Melbourne's horrid year on-field form caused them to win only three matches and ensured they received their 11th wooden spoon.

== 2008 list changes ==
=== 2007 trades ===
Trade gained	Traded from	Trade lost
Pick 14	Brisbane Lions	Travis Johnstone
John Meesen	Adelaide	Pick 37

=== Retirements and delistings ===
Player	New club	League	Reason	Ref
Nathan Brown	West Adelaide	SANFL	Retired	
Clint Bizzell	Unknown	Unknown	Retired	
Byron Pickett	Port Adelaide Magpies	SANFL	Retired	
Ryan Ferguson	West Adelaide	SANFL	Delisted	
Heath Neville	Hobart	TSL	Delisted	
Shane Neaves	West Adelaide	SANFL	Delisted	
Daniel Hayes	Unknown	Unknown	Delisted	
Simon Godfrey	Norwood	Eastern Football League	Delisted	
Daniel Ward	Unknown	Unknown	Delisted	

=== National draft ===
Round	Overall pick	Player	State	Position	Team from	League from
1	4	Cale Morton	(Western Australia)	Forward/Midfield	Claremont	WAFL
1	14	Jack Grimes	(Victoria (state))	Defender/Midfield	Northern Knights	TAC Cup
2	21	Addam Maric	(Victoria (state))	Forward	Calder Cannons	TAC Cup
4	53	Kyle Cheney	(Victoria (state))	Defender	North Ballarat Rebels	TAC Cup
5	66	Tom McNamara	(South Australia)	Defender	South Adelaide	SANFL

=== Pre-season draft ===
Round	Overall pick	Player	State	Position	Team from	League from
1	3	Stefan Martin	(Victoria (state))	Ruckman/Defender	Sandringham	VFL

=== Rookie draft ===
Round	Overall pick	Player	State	Position	Team from	League from
1	3	Trent Zomer	(Victoria (state))	Utility	Eastern Ranges	TAC Cup
2	19	Austin Wonaeamirri	(Northern Territory)	Forward	St Mary's Football Club; Norwood	NTFL; SANFL
3	35	Jake Spencer	(Queensland)	Ruckman	Redland Bombers	QAFL
4	49	Shane Valenti	(Victoria (state))	Midfield	Sandringham	VFL

== 2008 squad ==
Melbourne Football Club
Senior list		Rookie List	Coaching staff
1 Simon Buckley; 2 Nathan Jones; 3 Clint Bartram; 4 Ben Holland; 5 Brock McLean; 6 Matthew Bate; 7 Brad Miller; 8 James Frawley; 9 David Neitz; 10 Cale Morton; 11 Paul Johnson; 12 Colin Sylvia; 13 Adem Yze; 14 Lynden Dunn; 15 Ricky Petterd; 16 Jack Grimes; 17 Chris Johnson; 18 Brad Green; 19 Addam Maric	20 Colin Garland; 21 Daniel Bell; 22 Brent Moloney; 23 James McDonald (c); 24 Russell Robertson; 27 Jared Rivers; 28 Isaac Weetra; 29 Michael Newton; 31 Paul Wheatley; 32 Cameron Bruce; 33 Stefan Martin; 34 Jeff White; 36 Aaron Davey; 37 Matthew Warnock; 40 Mark Jamar; 41 Nathan Carroll; 43 Jace Bode; 45 Matthew Whelan	35 Trent Zomer; 39 Austin Wonaeamirri; 42 Jake Spencer; 44 Shane Valenti	Head coach: Dean Bailey; Assistant coaches: Josh Mahoney (forward coach); Anthony Rock (midfield coach); Sean Wellman (defensive coach); Mark Williams (development coach); Legend: (c) Captain(s); (vc) Vice-captain(s)

== 2008 season ==
=== Pre-season ===
==== NAB Cup ====
===== Week 1 =====
Round 1
Saturday, 16 February (4:40 pm)	Geelong	def.	Melbourne	Skilled Stadium (crowd: 15,000 est)
0.8.1 (49); 1.12.4 (85); 1.15.7 (106); 2.22.11 (161)	Q1; Q2; Q3; Final	0.2.4 (16); 1.4.4 (37); 2.8.5 (71); 2.11.5 (89)	Umpires: Rosebury, Nicholls, Sully, Kamolins; Television broadcast: Foxtel
Byrnes, Wojcinski	Super Goals	Buckley, Garland
Johnson 6, Lonergan 2, Gamble 2, Davenport 2, Kelly 2, Byrnes, Ablett, Stokes, Hunt, Prismall, Milburn, Mooney, Wojcinski	Goals	Newton 2, Garland 2, Valenti, Meesen, Sylvia, Zomer, Green, Weetra, Robertson
Johnson, Prismall, Ling, Stokes, Milburn, Mooney, Bartel, Wojcinski, Kelly	Best	Jones, Buckley, Valenti, Garland
Ablett (calf)	Injuries
Record: 0 Wins, 1 Loss, 0 Draws

==== NAB Challenge ====
===== Week 2 =====
Week 2
Friday, 22 Feb (7:30 pm)	Richmond	def.	Melbourne	Cazaly's Stadium (crowd: 5,321)
5.3 (33); 6.4 (40); 11.5 (71); 14.10 (94)	Q1; Q2; Q3; Final	2.3 (15); 5.5 (35); 6.9 (45); 8.11 (59)	Umpires: Kamolins, Armstrong, Kennedy; Television broadcast: none
Pettifer 3, Schulz 2, Hughes 2, Howat 2, Pattison, Foley, Morton, Brown, Raines	Goals	Newton 2, Bartram, Petterd, Green, Maric, Weetra, Davey
Pettifer, Newman, Simmonds, Tambling, Foley, Bowden	Best	Newton, Jones, Davey, Sylvia, Johnson, Valenti
Record: 0 Wins, 1 Loss, 0 Draws

===== Week 3 =====
Week 3
Friday, 29 Feb (7:00 pm)	Western Bulldogs	def.	Melbourne	Queen Elizabeth Oval (crowd: 7000 est)
2.3 (15); 8.4 (52); 11.7 (73); 14.9 (93)	Q1; Q2; Q3; Final	5.4 (34); 6.6 (42); 9.9 (63); 9.9 (63)	Umpires: Head, Kamolins, Mollison; Television broadcast: none
Murphy 2, Akermanis 2, Eagleton, Minson, O'Keefe, Ward, Hahn, Johnson, Boyd, Mulligan, Griffen, Welsh	Goals	Davey 2, Robertson 2, Neitz 2, Bate 2, Jones
Akermanis, Eagleton, Higgins, Hill, Cooney, Johnson	Best	Davey, Jones, Bate, Yze, Buckley, Sylvia
Reports	Robertson (charging)
13 minutes into the last quarter a power failure caused a black-out of the stadium. The match was therefore abandoned with the Western Bulldogs leading Melbourne 14.9.93 to 9.9.63.; Record: 0 Wins, 2 Losses, 0 Draws

===== Week 4 =====
Week 4
Saturday, 5 Mar (2:00 pm)	Melbourne	def. by	North Melbourne	Casey Fields (crowd: 6000+ est)
6.3 (39); 8.4 (52); 10.8 (68); 14.10 (94)	Q1; Q2; Q3; Final	6.4 (40); 11.7 (73); 19.11 (125); 22.14 (146)	Television broadcast: none
North Melbourne finished comfortable winners over Melbourne winning 22.14.146 to 14.10.94.; Record: 0 Wins, 3 Losses, 0 Draws

=== Home and away season ===
==== Round 1 ====
Round 1
Sunday, 23 Mar (4:40 pm)	Hawthorn	def.	Melbourne	MCG (crowd: 40,141)
5.5 (35); 7.10 (52); 15.12 (102); 23.16 (154)	Q1; Q2; Q3; Final	1.1 (7); 1.5 (11); 2.10 (22); 6.14 (50)	Umpires: Farmer, Kennedy, Nicholls; Television broadcast: Foxtel
Franklin 6, Roughead 3, Osborne 3, Dew 2, Boyle 2, Stokes 2, Campbell 2, Taylor, Young, Rioli	Goals	Robertson 3, Green 2, Newton
Bateman, Franklin, Mitchell, Gilham, Osborne, Ladson, Dew, Birchall	Best	Jones, Buckley, Green, Moloney
Croad (wrist)	Injuries
Melbourne lost its first game by over 100 points since Round 18, 1997.; Debut(s): Cale Morton, Isaac Weetra; Brownlow Votes: 1. Chance Bateman (Hawthorn), 2. Lance Franklin (Hawthorn), 3. Sam Mitchell (Hawthorn); Record: 0 Wins, 1 Loss, 0 Draws; Ladder Position: 16th

==== Round 2 ====
Round 2
Saturday, 29 Mar (2:10 pm)	Melbourne	def. by	Western Bulldogs	MCG (crowd: 27,821)
2.4 (16); 5.8 (38); 7.9 (51); 9.12 (66)	Q1; Q2; Q3; Final	2.5 (17); 9.9 (63); 18.13 (121); 24.17 (161)	Umpires: Farmer, Kamolins, Ryan; Television broadcast: Network Ten
Neitz 2, White 2, Robertson 2, Davey, Green, Jones	Goals	Murphy 4, Hill 3, Welsh 3, Akermanis 3, Johnson 3, Cross 3, Giansiracusa, Wight, Gilbee, Hahn, Griffen
Wheatley, McDonald, Jones, Green, Carroll	Best	Cross, West, Murphy, Cooney, Hill, Gilbee, Griffen, Boyd
Milestone(s): James McDonald (200th AFL game); Brownlow Votes: 1. Matthew Boyd (Western Bulldogs), 2. Daniel Cross (Western Bulldogs), 3. Scott West (Western Bulldogs); Record: 0 Wins, 2 Losses, 0 Draws; Ladder Position: 16th

==== Round 3 ====
Round 3
Sunday, 6 April (1:10 pm)	Geelong	def.	Melbourne	Skilled Stadium (crowd: 23,569)
4.4 (28); 8.11 (59); 13.14 (92); 16.16 (112)	Q1; Q2; Q3; Final	3.4 (22); 6.6 (42); 10.8 (68); 12.10 (82)	Umpires: Wenn, Sully, Ryan; Television broadcast: Foxtel
Hawkins 5, Mooney 2, Ling 2, Johnson 2, Blake, Ablett, Stokes, Milburn, Chapman	Goals	Bruce 3, Dunn 2, Morton 2, Miller, Wheatley, Neitz, White, Green
Corey, Bartel, Hawkins, Ling, Chapman, Taylor	Best	Morton, Johnson, Wheatley, Bruce, Green
Geelong finally unraveled its 2007 AFL premiership flag at the ground.; Odds of up to $34 from some betting agencies were offered for Melbourne to beat Geelong. These were the highest ever offered in a VFL/AFL game. Despite Melbourne kicking the first 3 goals of the game and staying in it for a large proportion of the game, Geelong proved to be too strong for a young Demons outfit running away with the game by 30 points.; Debut(s): Austin Wonaeamirri; Brownlow Votes: 1. Joel Corey (Geelong), 2. Tom Hawkins (Geelong), 3. Paul Chapman (Geelong); Record: 0 Wins, 3 Losses, 0 Draws; Ladder Position: 16th

==== Round 4 ====
Round 4
Saturday, 12 April (2:10 pm)	North Melbourne	def.	Melbourne	MCG (crowd: 23,427)
4.8 (32); 8.11 (59); 13.15 (93); 18.19 (117)	Q1; Q2; Q3; Final	1.0 (6); 3.6 (24); 5.10 (40); 11.13 (79)	Umpires: Farmer, Armstrong, McInerney; Television broadcast: Foxtel
Thompson 5, Edwards 3, Thomas 3, Campbell 2, Jones 2, Grant, Harvey, Smith	Goals	Robertson 3, Wonaeamirri 2, Davey, Dunn, Jamar, McLean, Wheatley, White
Harvey, Wells, Rawlings, Thompson, Edwards, Power, Power, Campbell, Firrito	Best	Davey, McDonald, Green
Gibson (knee)	Injuries
Reports	Miller (charging)
This match was originally scheduled to be played at Carrara Stadium. However due to North Melbourne's refusal to relocate north to the Gold Coast, the match was moved to the MCG.; Brownlow Votes: 1. Daniel Wells (North Melbourne), 2. Nathan Thompson (North Melbourne), 3. Brent Harvey (North Melbourne); Record: 0 Wins, 4 Losses, 0 Draws; Ladder Position: 16th

==== Round 5 ====
Round 5
Sunday, 20 April (1:10 pm)	Melbourne	def. by	Carlton	MCG (crowd: 44,159)
1.3 (9); 4.5 (29); 4.9 (33); 9.14 (68)	Q1; Q2; Q3; Final	3.3 (21); 10.6 (66); 12.10 (82); 15.11 (101)	Umpires: Stevic, Stewart, Schmitt; Television broadcast: Foxtel
Green 4, Robertson 2, Jamar, Jones, McDonald	Goals	Fevola 7, Judd 3, Fisher, Kreuzer, Ó hAilpín, Murphy, Pfeiffer
Bruce, Green, McLean, White, McDonald	Best	Judd, Scotland, Kreuzer, Waite, Carrazzo
Neitz (neck/shoulder)	Injuries	Bannister (hamstring), Gibbs
Whelan (striking)	Reports	Thornton (striking)
This game marked David Neitz's last ever AFL match, due to a neck injury sustained during the second quarter when Jarrad Waite laid a heavy tackle on him.; Milestone(s): Daniel Bell (50th AFL game); Brownlow Votes: 1. Brendan Fevola (Carlton), 2. Jarrad Waite (Carlton), 3. Chris Judd (Carlton); Record: 0 Wins, 5 Losses, 0 Draws; Ladder Position: 16th

==== Round 6 ====
Round 6
Sunday, 27 April (1:10 pm)	Brisbane Lions	def.	Melbourne	Gabba (crowd: 22,878)
3.6 (24); 10.13 (73); 15.17 (107); 19.23 (137)	Q1; Q2; Q3; Final	2.1 (13); 5.2 (32); 8.3 (51); 13.7 (85)	Umpires: Nicholls, Head, Armstrong; Television broadcast: Foxtel
Bradshaw 6, Hooper 4, Corrie 3, Johnstone 2, Brown 2, Adcock, Rischitelli	Goals	Jones 4, Wonaeamirri 3, Miller 2, Sylvia 2, Green, Robertson
Black, Power, Corrie, Macdonald, Brennan, Hooper	Best	Jones, Green, Moloney, Bruce, Wonaeamirri, Jamar
Injuries	Sylvia (shoulder)
Brownlow Votes: 1. Daniel Bradshaw (Brisbane Lions), 2. Anthony Corrie (Brisbane Lions), 3. Simon Black (Brisbane Lions); Record: 0 Wins, 6 Losses, 0 Draws; Ladder Position: 16th

==== Round 7 ====
Round 7
Sunday, 4 May (2:10 pm)	Melbourne	def.	Fremantle	MCG (crowd: 19,423)
1.3 (9); 3.8 (26); 8.15 (63); 17.17 (119)	Q1; Q2; Q3; Final	5.6 (36); 11.10 (76); 13.17 (95); 15.23 (113)	Umpires: James, Stewart, Avon; Television broadcast: Seven Network
Wonaeamirri 4, Robertson 4, Davey 3, Miller 3, Green 2, Moloney	Goals	Pavlich 5, Tarrant 3, Farmer 2, Palmer, Bell, Ibbotson, Mundy, Solomon
McLean, Wonaeamirri, Robertson, Davey, Miller, Bruce, Green	Best	Pavlich, Solomon, Palmer, Sandilands, Bell, Ibbotson, Tarrant
Injuries	McPharlin (corked buttock), Headland (knee)
Trailing by as much as 51 points at the start of the third quarter, Melbourne kicked 14 goal to 4 in the second half to win by 6 points and give Dean Bailey a historical first win as a senior coach.; Melbourne's win was the second greatest win from a half-time deficit in VFL/AFL history.; Melbourne players received Brownlow votes from any match for the first time in 2008.; Austin Wonaeamirri received the NAB AFL Rising Star nomitation for Round 7.; Brownlow Votes: 1. Jeff White (Melbourne), 2. Matthew Pavlich (Fremantle), 3. Brock McLean (Melbourne); Record: 1 Win, 6 Losses, 0 Draws; Ladder Position: 16th

==== Round 8 ====
Round 8
Sunday, 18 May (12:40 pm)	Adelaide	def.	Melbourne	AAMI Stadium (crowd: 35,649)
8.1 (49); 12.6 (78); 15.15 (105); 22.18 (150)	Q1; Q2; Q3; Final	4.4 (28); 6.5 (41); 7.7 (49); 11.8 (74)	Umpires: Fila, Meredith, Ellis; Television broadcast: Foxtel
Burton 5, Tippett 4, Goodwin 3, Jericho 3, Porplyzia 3, Stevens, Knights, van Berlo, Vince	Goals	Morton 3, Robertson 2, Wonaeamirri, Miller, Moloney, Garland, Bartram, Bate
Burton, Vince, Tippett, Porplyzia, van Berlo, Goodwin, Bock, Shirley	Best	Bartram, Buckley, Jones, Morton
Massie (hamstring)	Injuries	Rivers
Debut(s): Shane Valenti; Brownlow Votes: 1. Brett Burton (Adelaide), 2. Bernie Vince (Adelaide), 3. Jason Porplyzia (Adelaide); Record: 1 Win, 7 Losses, 0 Draws; Ladder Position: 16th

==== Round 9 ====
Round 9
Sunday, 25 May (2:10 pm)	Melbourne	def. by	Hawthorn	MCG (crowd: 41,341)
4.3 (27); 6.4 (40); 9.5 (59); 12.6 (78)	Q1; Q2; Q3; Final	3.3 (21); 4.7 (31); 10.9 (69); 14.13 (97)	Umpires: James, Grun, Armstrong; Television broadcast: Seven Network
Holland 3, Robertson 2, Wonaeamirri 2, Jones 2, Johnson, Davey, Bruce	Goals	Franklin 3, Rioli 3, Williams 3, Ladson, Campbell, Roughead, Ellis, Clarke
McLean, Bate, Davey, Holland, Wonaeamirri, Moloney	Best	Bateman, Rioli, Campbell, Birchall, Mitchell, Franklin
White (back), Robertson (thigh), Holland (shoulder)	Injuries	Lewis (thigh), Dew (hamstring)
Melbourne gave a spirited effort against Hawthorn after the announcement of David Neitz's retirement as well as controversial comments made by Hawthorn president Jeff Kennett against the club earlier that week. Despite a full game effort by Melbourne, Hawthorn would triumph by 19 points and regain top spot on the AFL ladder.; Hawthorn's second win over Melbourne for the year allowed them to overtake Melbourne's tally in wins for all VFL/AFL games contested between the two sides.; Brownlow Votes: 1. Brock McLean (Melbourne), 2. Brad Sewell (Hawthorn), 3. Sam Mitchell (Hawthorn); Record: 1 Win, 8 Losses, 0 Draws; Ladder Position: 16th

==== Round 10 ====
Round 10
Sunday, 1 June (2:10 pm)	St Kilda	def.	Melbourne	Telstra Dome (crowd: 27,854)
5.4 (34); 10.6 (66); 12.12 (84); 19.15 (129)	Q1; Q2; Q3; Final	2.2 (14); 3.4 (22); 3.6 (24); 7.8 (50)	Umpires: Stevic, Stewart, Head; Television broadcast: Seven Network
Schneider 5, Milne 3, Birss 2, Koschitzke 2, Riewoldt, Dal Santo, Gram, Ball, Jones, Montagna, Dempster	Goals	Yze 3, Dunn, Robertson, Sylvia, Bruce
Ball, Fisher, Gram, Dal Santo, Goddard, Montagna, Riewoldt	Best	Mcdonald, McLean, Bruce, Warnock, Garland
Injuries	Robertson (achilles), Bate (hand)
Russell Robertson's season would end pre-maturely after rupturing an Achilles tendon during the game.; Milestone(s): Brad Miller (100th AFL game); Brownlow Votes: 1. Nick Riewoldt (St Kilda), 2. Nick Dal Santo (St Kilda), 3. Luke Ball (St Kilda); Record: 1 Win, 9 Losses, 0 Draws; Ladder Position: 16th

==== Round 11 ====
Round 11
Monday, 9 June (2:10 pm)	Melbourne	def. by	Collingwood	MCG (crowd: 59,548)
4.1 (25); 7.4 (46); 11.9 (75); 13.17 (95)	Q1; Q2; Q3; Final	3.2 (20); 8.5 (53); 15.8 (98); 17.14 (116)	Umpires: Vosso, Farmer, Meredith; Television broadcast: Network Ten
Wonaeamirri 3, Sylvia 3, Yze 2, Green 2, Dunn, Jones, McLean	Goals	Didak 2, Shaw 2, Lockyer 2, Davis 2, Fraser, Johnson, Medhurst, Brown, Swan, Wellingham, O'Brien, Cox, Thomas
McLean, Jones, Bruce, Yze, Warnock, Dunn	Best	Burns, Didak, Lockyer, Maxwell, O'Brien, Bryan
Rivers (groin), Moloney (shoulder)	Injuries	Rocca (ankle), Pendlebury (back), Cook
Before the match Melbourne celebrated its 150 Heroes with a Lap of Honour around the MCG from past players.; Also before the match Paul Gardiner announced his resignation as Melbourne's president and announced Jim Stynes as his successor.; Collingwood's win ended Melbourne's winning streak of 4 consecutive Queen's Birthday clashes; Brownlow Votes: 1. Adem Yze (Melbourne), 2. Scott Burns (Collingwood), 3. Tarkyn Lockyer (Collingwood); Record: 1 win, 10 losses, 0 draws Ladder position: 16th

==== Round 12 ====
Round 12
Sunday, 15 June (4:40 pm)	Richmond	def.	Melbourne	Telstra Dome (crowd: 27,348)
3.6 (24); 11.13 (79); 13.15 (93); 16.20 (116)	Q1; Q2; Q3; Final	5.3 (33); 6.5 (41); 11.8 (74); 14.10 (94)	Umpires: Sully, Nicholls, Ryan; Television broadcast: Foxtel
Richardson 5, Brown 3, Morton 2, Cotchin 2, Polak, Simmonds, Tuck, White	Goals	Miller 3, Bartram 2, Bruce 2, Davey 2, Bate, Garland, Green, White, Wonaeamirri
Richardson, Deledio, Brown, Tuck, Cotchin, Polak	Best	Bruce, Wheatley, McLean, Miller, White, Garland
Brownlow Votes: 1. Brock McLean (Melbourne), 2. Brett Deledio (Richmond), 3. Matthew Richardson (Richmond); Record: 1 Win, 11 Losses, 0 Draws; Ladder Position: 16th

==== Round 13 ====
Round 13
Sunday, 22 June (1:10 pm)	Melbourne	def. by	Sydney	Manuka Oval (crowd: 11,437)
2.2 (14); 5.3 (33); 10.5 (65); 11.8 (74)	Q1; Q2; Q3; Final	7.2 (44); 10.5 (65); 12.10 (82); 17.12 (114)	Umpires: Sully, Grun, Head; Television broadcast: Foxtel
Bate 4, Wonaeamirri 3, Bruce, Johnson, McLean, Miller	Goals	Hall 5, Buchanan 2, Mattner 2, O'Loughlin 2, Goodes, Jolly, Malceski, O'Keefe, Playfair, Roberts-Thomson
Bate, Dunn, Green, Johnson, Garland, Johnson	Best	Hall, Kirk Mattner, Jolly, Bolton, O'Loughlin
Brownlow Votes: 1. Matthew Bate (Melbourne), 2. Barry Hall (Sydney), 3. Brett Kirk (Sydney); Record: 1 Win, 12 Losses, 0 Draws; Ladder Position: 16th

==== Round 14 ====
Round 14
Sunday, 29 June (1:10 pm)	Melbourne	def.	Brisbane Lions	MCG (crowd: 23,278)
5.4 (34); 6.6 (42); 10.8 (68); 14.9 (93)	Q1; Q2; Q3; Final	2.3 (15); 5.9 (39); 9.13 (67); 13.14 (92)	Umpires: Head, Armstrong, Jeffery; Television broadcast: Foxtel
Sylvia 4, Miller 4, Wonaeamirri 2, Bruce 2, Bate, Green	Goals	Brown 5, Bradshaw 4, Hooper 2, Patfull, Rischitelli
Wheatley, Green, Johnson, Miller, Sylvia, Whelan, Jones	Best	Power, Brown Rischitelli, Bradshaw, Black
McLean (ankle)	Injuries	Johnstone (hamstring)
A mark and goal in the goal square by Brad Miller followed by a charge up the ground with the ball from the half-back line by Austin Wonaeamirri allowed Melbourne to win its second game of the year by a point.; After selling a home game to the Gabba against the Brisbane Lions each year for seven years, Melbourne would win its first game against the Brisbane Lions at the MCG since Round 18, 1998.; For the first and only time in 2008, Melbourne players would collect all the Brownlow votes in a game.; Colin Garland received the NAB AFL Rising Star nomitation for Round 14.; Debut(s): Stefan Martin; Brownlow Votes: 1. Chris Johnson (Melbourne), 2. Paul Wheatley (Melbourne), 3. Brad Green (Melbourne); Record: 2 Wins, 12 Losses, 0 Draws; Ladder Position: 16th

==== Round 15 ====
Round 15
Sunday, 13 July (2:10 pm)	Western Bulldogs	def.	Melbourne	Telstra Dome (crowd: 27,446)
3.2 (20); 7.4 (46); 12.7 (79); 14.11 (95)	Q1; Q2; Q3; Final	1.0 (6); 4.2 (26); 5.6 (36); 9.10 (64)	Umpires: Farmer, McLaren, Keating; Television broadcast: Seven Network
Akermanis 3, Minson 3, Eagleton 2, Giansiracusa 2, Hahn 2, Harbrow, Cross	Goals	Miller 3, Green 2, Dunn, Johnson, Buckley, Newton
Cross, Boyd, Lake, Gilbee, Akermanis, Eagleton, Hill, Everitt	Best	Bruce, Garland, Johnson, Wheatley, Martin, Miller
Welsh (back)	Injuries
Brownlow Votes: 1. Lindsay Gilbee (Western Bulldogs), 2. Cameron Bruce (Melbourne), 3. Matthew Boyd (Western Bulldogs); Record: 2 Wins, 13 Losses, 0 Draws; Ladder Position: 16th

==== Round 16 ====
Round 16
Sunday, 20 July (2:40 pm)	Fremantle	def.	Melbourne	Subiaco (crowd: 31,638)
0.2 (2); 5.9 (39); 11.15 (81); 16.18 (114)	Q1; Q2; Q3; Final	5.1 (31); 6.3 (39); 7.5 (47); 10.8 (68)	Umpires: Kennedy, Hendrie, Avon; Television broadcast: Foxtel
Pavlich 5, McPharlin 3, Ibbotson, Schammer, Carr, McManus, O'Brien, Sandilands, Tarrant, Peake	Goals	Morton 2, Miller 2, Bate 2, Newton 2, Johnson, Jamar
Pavlich, Schammer, Ibbotson, Crowley, McPharlin, McManus	Best	Johnson, Wheatley, Buckley, Bruce, Bate, Jones
O'Brien (hamstring)	Injuries
Brownlow Votes: 1. Michael Johnson (Fremantle), 2. Antoni Grover (Fremantle), 3. Matthew Pavlich (Fremantle); Record: 2 Wins, 14 Losses, 0 Draws; Ladder Position: 16th

==== Round 17 ====
Round 17
Sunday, 27 July (2:10 pm)	Melbourne	def. by	North Melbourne	MCG (crowd: 21,330)
1.3 (9); 3.4 (22); 6.8 (44); 10.10 (70)	Q1; Q2; Q3; Final	7.3 (45); 9.6 (60); 11.9 (75); 14.14 (98)	Umpires: McLaren, Fila, Hendrie, Television broadcast: Seven Network
Miller 3, Newton 2, Davey, Valenti, Johnson, Sylvia, Morton	Goals	Thomas 5, Jones 4, Harvey 2, Petrie, Hale, Campbell
Buckley, Jones, Valenti, Davey, McDonald, Johnson	Best	Harvey, Hale, Jones, Thomas, Gibson, Simpson, Rawlings
Dunn (striking)	Reports
Debut(s): Addam Maric; Brownlow Votes: 1. Simon Buckley (Melbourne), 2. Adam Simpson (North Melbourne), 3. Brent Harvey (North Melbourne); Record: 2 Wins, 15 Losses, 0 Draws; Ladder Position: 16th

==== Round 18 ====
Round 18
Saturday, 2 August (2:10 pm)	Essendon	def.	Melbourne	MCG (crowd: 46,334)
3.1 (19); 9.6 (60); 14.8 (92); 19.10 (124)	Q1; Q2; Q3; Final	2.2 (14); 7.3 (45); 11.5 (71); 17.6 (108)	Umpires: Kennedy, Sully, Fila; Television broadcast: Foxtel
Lloyd 8, Monfries 3, McPhee 2, Lovett 2, Atkinson, Reimers, Slattery, Jetta	Goals	Morton 3, Sylvia 3, Maric 2, Bate 2, Bartram, Green, Buckley, Davey, Johnson, Jamar, Wonaeamirri
Lloyd, Hille, Monfries, Fletcher, McPhee, Peverill, Lovett-Murray, Nash	Best	McDonald, Sylvia, Morton, Garland, Dunn, Bate, Bruce
Reimers (hamstring)	Injuries	Garland (hamstring), Davey (heel)
Matthew Lloyd took the 2008 Mark of the Year in this match leaping over Brad Green, Matthew Warnock and Sam Lonergan to do so.; Brownlow Votes: 1. Adam McPhee (Essendon), 2. Cale Morton (Melbourne), 3. Matthew Lloyd (Essendon); Record: 2 Wins, 16 Losses, 0 Draws; Ladder Position: 16th

==== Round 19 ====
Round 19
Friday, 8 August (7:05 pm)	Melbourne	def. by	Geelong	MCG (crowd: 34,610)
0.0 (0); 1.3 (9); 2.6 (18); 5.11 (41)	Q1; Q2; Q3; Final	8.5 (53); 12.7 (79); 19.10 (124); 24.13 (157)	Umpires: Donlon, Kennedy, Ryan; Television broadcast: Seven Network
Valenti 2, Johnson, Johnson, Wonaeamirri	Goals	Morton 4, Stokes 4, Prismall 3, Ablett 2, Bartel 2, Ling 2, Mackie 2, Blake, Gamble, Johnson, Mooney, Selwood
Whelan, Wheatley, Maric, Martin	Best	Mackie, Ling, Selwood, Corey, Scarlett, Prismall
This match kicked off Tom Wills Round. Tom Wills was regarded as one of the pioneers of writing the rules to Australian Rules Football as well as creating and being the very first captain of the Melbourne Football Club in 1858. He also played a majority of Australian Rules Football games for Geelong as one of their first ever players.; This match commemorated the 150th anniversary of the first ever game of Australian Rules Football contested between Scotch College and Melbourne Grammar School on 7 August 1858, in the Richmond Paddock.; To celebrate the 150th Anniversary of Australian Rules Football a match was contested between Scotch College and Melbourne Grammar School as pre-game entertainment to the clash between Melbourne and Geelong.; This match begun half an hour earlier than the usual Friday Night Football starting time of 7:40 PM and was broadcast live across Australia. This was to prevent it from clashing with the Opening ceremony of the 2008 Beijing Olympics which was also broadcast by Channel 7.; In cold and wet conditions, Melbourne was inflicted with its heaviest loss for the season (116 points) and at the time the second worst loss to Geelong in VFL/AFL history before Round 19, 2011 where Geelong thrashed Melbourne by 186 points.; Brownlow Votes: 1. Joel Corey (Geelong), 2. Joel Selwood (Geelong), 3. Andrew Mackie (Geelong); Record: 2 Wins, 17 Losses, 0 Draws; Ladder Position: 16th

==== Round 20 ====
Round 20
Saturday, 16 August (2:10 pm)	Melbourne	def.	West Coast	MCG (crowd: 17,598)
1.3 (9); 5.7 (37); 8.12 (60); 11.13 (79)	Q1; Q2; Q3; Final	2.2 (14); 4.5 (29); 5.10 (40); 5.15 (45)	Umpires: Ryan, Ellis, Nicholls; Television broadcast: Network Ten
Bruce 2, Newton 2, Bartram, Bate, Green, Johnson, Miller, Morton, Sylvia	Goals	McKinley 2, Armstrong, LeCras, Lynch
Bruce, Wheatley, Morton, Green, McDonald, Whelan, Buckley, Jones	Best	Armstrong, Cox, Embley, Mackenzie
Injuries	Wilkes (neck)
Despite the West Coast Eagles kicking 3 early goals in the second quarter, Melbourne would bounce back and win their third and final game of the season comfortably in cold and rainy conditions.; Melbourne would concede only one goal in the second half to obtain their greatest winning margin for the season (34 points).; Melbourne would win its first game against West Coast since Round 7, 2004.; Cale Morton received the NAB AFL Rising Star nomitation for Round 20.; Brownlow Votes: 1. Dean Cox (West Coast), 2. Cale Morton (Melbourne), 3. Paul Wheatley (Melbourne); Record: 3 Wins, 17 Losses, 0 Draws; Ladder Position: 16th

==== Round 21 ====
Round 21
Saturday, 23 August (2:40 pm)	Port Adelaide	def.	Melbourne	AAMI Stadium (crowd: 18,875)
6.6 (42); 9.10 (64); 10.17 (77); 18.21 (129)	Q1; Q2; Q3; Final	1.0 (6); 2.4 (16); 4.8 (32); 7.9 (51)	Umpires: Margetts, Head, Keating; Television broadcast: Foxtel
Motlop 5, Westhoff 2, Westhoff 2, Lade 2, Burgoyne 2, Pearce 2, Rodan, Cassisi, Boak	Goals	Miller 2, Bruce, Bate, Wonaeamirri, Jamar, Newton
Burgoyne, Burgoyne, Cassisi, Motlop, Logan, Brogan, Pearce	Best	Wheatley, Buckley, McDonald, Garland, Morton
Chaplin (knee)	Injuries
Brownlow Votes: 1. Shaun Burgoyne (Port Adelaide), 2. Daniel Motlop (Port Adelaide), 3. Domenic Cassisi (Port Adelaide); Record: 3 Wins, 18 Losses, 0 Draws; Ladder Position: 16th

==== Round 22 ====
Round 22
Sunday, 31 August (2:10 pm)	Melbourne	def. by	Richmond	MCG (crowd: 37,046)
2.1 (13); 3.1 (19); 4.4 (28); 6.5 (41)	Q1; Q2; Q3; Final	2.5 (17); 8.9 (57); 12.10 (82); 18.13 (121)	Umpires: Margetts, Ryan, Ellis; Television broadcast: Seven Network
White 2, Green, Holland, Sylvia, Whelan	Goals	Deledio 4, Bowden 3, Jackson 2, Riewoldt 2, Connors, Foley, McMahon, Morton, Tivendale, Tuck, White
Yze, Whelan, Bruce, Warnock, Garland	Best	Bowden, Tuck, Newman, Deledio, Foley, McGuane, Johnson, McMahon
Sylvia (ankle), Petterd (hamstring)	Injuries	Connors
Miller (wrestling)	Reports	Morton (wrestling)
Melbourne would finish the year on the bottom of the ladder with 3 wins and 19 losses.; Ben Holland, Jeff White and Adem Yze played their last AFL game in this match and retired straight afterwards.; Debut(s): Jack Grimes; Milestone(s): Nathan Jones (50th AFL game); Brownlow Votes: 1. Shane Tuck (Richmond), 2. Brett Deledio (Richmond), 3. Joel Bowden (Richmond); Record: 3 Wins, 19 Losses, 0 Draws; Ladder Position: 16th

== Ladder ==
2008 AFL ladder
Pos	Team	Pld	W	L	D	PF	PA	PP	Pts	
1	Geelong	22	21	1	0	2672	1651	161.8	84	Finals series
2	Hawthorn (P)	22	17	5	0	2434	1846	131.9	68	Finals series
3	Western Bulldogs	22	15	6	1	2506	2112	118.7	62	Finals series
4	St Kilda	22	13	9	0	2126	1923	110.6	52	Finals series
5	Adelaide	22	13	9	0	2017	1838	109.7	52	Finals series
6	Sydney	22	12	9	1	2095	1863	112.5	50	Finals series
7	North Melbourne	22	12	9	1	2121	2187	97.0	50	Finals series
8	Collingwood	22	12	10	0	2267	2038	111.2	48	Finals series
9	Richmond	22	11	10	1	2228	2288	97.4	46	
10	Brisbane	22	10	12	0	2156	2200	98.0	40	
11	Carlton	22	10	12	0	2217	2354	94.2	40	
12	Essendon	22	8	14	0	2130	2608	81.7	32	
13	Port Adelaide	22	7	15	0	2118	2208	95.9	28	
14	Fremantle	22	6	16	0	1988	2121	93.7	24	
15	West Coast	22	4	18	0	1670	2535	65.9	16	
16	Melbourne	22	3	19	0	1629	2602	62.6	12	

Source: AFL ladder
Rules for classification: 1) points; 2) percentage; 3) number of points for.
(P) Premiers

=== Ladder breakdown by opposition ===
Opponent	Played	Won	Lost	Drew	Premiership points	Points for	Points against	Percentage (%)
West Coast	1	1	0	0	4	79	45	175.56
Fremantle	2	1	1	0	4	187	227	82.38
Brisbane Lions	2	1	1	0	4	179	230	77.83
Essendon	1	0	1	0	0	108	124	87.10
Collingwood	1	0	1	0	0	95	116	81.90
Carlton	1	0	1	0	0	68	101	67.33
North Melbourne	2	0	2	0	0	149	225	66.22
Sydney	1	0	1	0	0	74	114	64.91
Richmond	2	0	2	0	0	135	237	56.96
Hawthorn	2	0	2	0	0	128	251	51.00
Western Bulldogs	2	0	2	0	0	130	256	50.78
Adelaide	1	0	1	0	0	74	150	49.33
Geelong	2	0	2	0	0	123	269	45.72
Port Adelaide	1	0	1	0	0	51	129	39.53
St Kilda	1	0	1	0	0	50	129	38.76
Total	22	3	19	0	12	1629	2601	62.61

== Awards ==
=== Brownlow Medal tally ===
Player	1 vote games	2 vote games	3 vote games	Total votes
Paul Wheatley	0	1	1	(5)
Brock McLean	2	0	1	(5)
Cale Morton	0	2	0	(4)
Brad Green	1	0	0	(3)
Cameron Bruce	0	1	0	(2)
Chris Johnson	1	0	0	(1)
Jeff White	1	0	0	(1)
Adem Yze	1	0	0	(1)
Matthew Bate	1	0	0	(1)
Simon Buckley	1	0	0	(1)
Total	7	4	3	(24)

=== Keith 'Bluey' Truscott Medal tally (top 10) ===
Position	Player	Votes
1st	Cameron Bruce	(75)
2nd	Brock McLean	(60)
3rd	Brad Green	(57)
4th	Matthew Warnock	(47)
5th	James McDonald	(46)
6th	Brad Miller	(40)
6th	Cale Morton	(40)
8th	Clint Bartram	(39)
8th	Paul Wheatley	(39)
8th	Austin Wonaeamirri	(39)

Keith 'Bluey' Truscott Trophy – Cameron Bruce

Sid Anderson Memorial Trophy (Second in the Best and Fairest) – Brock McLean

Ron Barassi Snr Memorial Trophy (Third in the Best and Fairest) – Brad Green

Ivor Warne-Smith Memorial Trophy (Fourth in the Best and Fairest) – Matthew Warnock

Dick Taylor Memorial Trophy (Fifth in the Best and Fairest) – James McDonald

Harold Ball Memorial Trophy (Best First Year Player) – Cale Morton

Troy Broadbridge Trophy (highest polling MFC player in the Casey Best and Fairest) – Adem Yze

Ron Barassi Leadership Award – Brad Green

Ian Ridley Club Ambassador Award – Clint Bartram

Norm Smith Memorial Trophy (Coach's Award) – Matthew Warnock

Leading Goalkicker Award – Brad Miller (26)

== 150 Heroes ==
Melbourne FC announced its "150 Heroes" to celebrate its 150th birthday at Crown Casino on 7 June 2008. These were also presented during the Queen's Birthday Clash against Collingwood in Round 11. Each player, or their closest relative, were presented with an official 150 heroes medallion.

The criteria for inclusion was games played (minimum of 100), best-and-fairest awards, premierships, Brownlow Medals, contribution to the club and State representation. Those who died in the war were judged based on their achievements before their death. The heroes named were:

Jim Abernethy, Frank Adams, Bill Allen, Stan Alves, Syd Anderson, Tony Anderson, Lance Arnold, Ron Baggott, Garry Baker, Harold Ball, Ron Barassi, Percy Beames, John Beckwith, George Bickford, Ray Biffin, Barry Bourke, Harry Brereton, Cameron Bruce, Keith Carroll, Geoff Case, Albert Chadwick, Noel Clarke, Geoff Collins, Jack Collins, Chris Connolly, Bob Corbett, Denis Cordner, Don Cordner, Ted Cordner, Vin Coutie, Harry Coy, Jim Davidson, Frank Davis, Ross Dillon, Carl Ditterich, Brian Dixon, Len Dockett, Adrian Dullard, Hugh Dunbar, Richie Emselle, Fred Fanning, Jeff Farmer, Matthew Febey, Steven Febey, Dick Fenton-Smith, Rowley Fischer, Robert Flower, Laurie Fowler, Maurice Gibb, Peter Giles, Terry Gleeson, Brad Green, Rod Grinter, George Haines, Gary Hardeman, Henry Harrison, Gerard Healy, Greg Healy, Dick Hingston, Paul Hopgood, Danny Hughes, Anthony Ingerson, Eddie Jackson, Alan Johnson, Bob Johnson, Tassie Johnson, Trevor Johnson, Travis Johnstone, Gordon Jones, Les Jones, Bryan Kenneally, Allan La Fontaine, Clyde Laidlaw, Frank Langley, Jack Leith, Andrew Leoncelli, Charlie Lilley, Wally Lock, Harry Long, John Lord, Andy Lovell, Brett Lovett, Glenn Lovett, Garry Lyon, Hassa Mann, George Margitich, Peter Marquis, Bernie Massey, Anthony McDonald, James McDonald, Fred McGinis, Shane McGrath, Bob McKenzie, Col McLean, Ian McLean, Noel McMahen, Ken Melville, Laurie Mithen, Peter Moore, Jack Mueller, David Neitz, Stephen Newport, Jack O'Keefe, Andrew Obst, Gordon Ogden, Greg Parke, Joe Pearce, Jack Purse, Ian Ridley, Guy Rigoni, Frank Roberts, Russell Robertson, Alby Rodda, Brian Roet, Peter Rohde, Alan Rowarth, David Schwarz, Norm Smith, Steven Smith, Earl Spalding, Stuart Spencer, Charlie Streeter, Steven Stretch, Jim Stynes, Tony Sullivan, Dick Taylor, Ted Thomas, Ian Thorogood, Stephen Tingay, John Townsend, Keith Truscott, Geoff Tunbridge, Bill Tymms, Barrie Vagg, Francis Vine, Todd Viney, Ivor Warne-Smith, Ray Wartman, Athol Webb, Greg Wells, Jeff White, Sean Wight, Don Williams, Brian Wilson, Stan Wittman, Shane Woewodin, Graeme Yeats, Charlie Young, Adem Yze

== Off-field crises and debt demolition ==
Aside from Melbourne's on-field struggles throughout the year, they were also placed into financial turmoil and the possibility of filing for bankruptcy.

On 4 February, CEO Steve Harris announced his resignation after reportedly cutting Melbourne's pre-existing debt by 50% and increasing membership sales by 40% since 2003. He was later replaced by former Wimbledon tennis champion Paul McNamee on 18 March, despite the fact that McNamee did not originally apply for the job.

With no cash, no solidified training or administration base and decreased membership count from 2007, the Demons found themselves winning only one game in the first half of the season. On 23 May, Hawthorn president Jeff Kennett suggested that Melbourne should relocate to the Gold Coast if they were to have a financially stable future. Melbourne was expected to lose $1–2 million during the year and put their near future as an existing football club in doubt.

Melbourne had little to celebrate heading into their 150 Heroes dinner on 7 June, during which Jim Stynes announced his intention to challenge Paul Gardiner's role as Melbourne's president. Two days later, before the Queen's Birthday clash, Gardiner announced his resignation as Melbourne's president, and endorsed Stynes to take over. On 12 June, Stynes was announced as the new president of the Melbourne Football Club and announced his primary intention to wipe off Melbourne's debt. Three days later he announced that Melbourne was $4.5 million in debt and that he would create a campaign called Debt Demolition to wipe off the debt. The campaign took place during August, beginning on 5 August during the 150 Foundation Heroes dinner. Guests and supporters were asked to dig deep and donate at least $5,000 to be considered a 150 Foundation Hero.

During June, Melbourne had a late surge in membership purchases for 2008. On 30 June, Melbourne successfully increased their membership count from 2007 gaining a record high 29,619 members at the time and falling just short of their goal of 30,000.

On 23 July, Stynes sacked Paul McNamee as CEO of the club. During his time as CEO, NcNamee was criticised for taking a mid-season holiday to England to play in a Wimbledon doubles match. He was also criticised for trying to lure Brisbane Lions' forward Jonathan Brown to Melbourne. Stynes stated, however, that the main reason he was sacked was his lack of a football background.

Melbourne held its 150 Foundation Heroes dinner on 5 August where they launched their Debt Demolition campaign. Melbourne raised $1.3 million from former players and supporters that night. At the end of the month the club had raised up to $3 million. Despite all the donations Melbourne received, their major sponsor Primus Telecom announced that it would not continue its $1 million per year arrangements with the club in 2009.

On 26 August, Melbourne announced Cameron Schwab as their new CEO. Schwab left his role of CEO at Fremantle and re-joined Melbourne for the third time since 1982.

On 18 December, the AFL agreed to increase Melbourne's 2009 from $250,000 to $1 million, with the Melbourne Cricket Club (MCC) contracted to match the AFL's offer. However, financial disagreements between the MCC and AFL prevented them from co-funding all Victorian clubs temporarily until an agreement was worked out on 20 December.

Melbourne finished the year $2.5 million in debt. They continued with the Debt Demolition campaign in August 2009, finishing the year with a debt of $1.5 million, and in August 2010. On 5 August 2010 Melbourne clear all of its $4.5 million debt as Jim Stynes announced the club to be debt free for the first time in 30 years.
