= 2006 AFL Rising Star =

Australian rules football award

2006 NAB AFL Rising Star
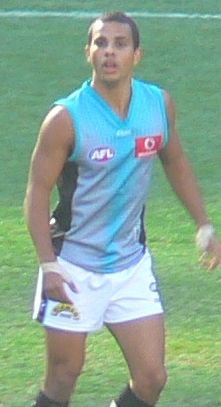
- Danyle Pearce, winner of the 2006 AFL Rising Star award, during the 2007 AFL season
- Sponsored by: National Australia Bank
- Country: Australia
- Rising Star: Danyle Pearce (Port Adelaide)

The NAB AFL Rising Star award is given annually to a stand out young player in the Australian Football League. The 2006 medal was won by Port Adelaide player Danyle Pearce.

== Eligibility ==
Every round, an Australian Football League rising star nomination is given to a stand out young player. To be eligible for the award, a player must be under 21 on 1 January of that year, have played 10 or fewer senior games and not been suspended during the season. At the end of the year, one of the 22 nominees is the winner of award.

== Nominations ==
| Round | Player | Club | Ref. |
|---|---|---|---|
| 1 | Marc Murphy | Carlton | |
| 2 | Dale Thomas | Collingwood | |
| 3 | Danyle Pearce | Port Adelaide | |
| 4 | Andrew Raines | Richmond | |
| 5 | Heath Shaw | Collingwood | |
| 6 | Dean Polo | Richmond | |
| 7 | Clint Bartram | Melbourne | |
| 8 | Michael Rischitelli | Brisbane Lions | |
| 9 | Brad Symes | Port Adelaide | |
| 10 | Matt Rosa | West Coast | |
| 11 | Jacob Surjan | Port Adelaide | |
| 12 | Clinton Young | Hawthorn | |
| 13 | Cheynee Stiller | Brisbane Lions | |
| 14 | Grant Birchall | Hawthorn | |
| 15 | Matthew Moody | Brisbane Lions | |
| 16 | Troy Chaplin | Port Adelaide | |
| 17 | Andrew Swallow | Kangaroos | |
| 18 | Matthew Bate | Melbourne | |
| 19 | Nathan Foley | Richmond | |
| 20 | Nathan Jones | Melbourne | |
| 21 | Brad Moran | Kangaroos | |
| 22 | Mark LeCras | West Coast | |

== Final voting ==
| | Player | Club | Votes |
|---|---|---|---|
| 1 | Danyle Pearce | Port Adelaide | 43 |
| 2 | Andrew Raines | Richmond | 33 |
| 3 | Heath Shaw | Collingwood | 32 |
| 4 | Marc Murphy | Carlton | 13 |
| 5 | Clint Bartram | Melbourne | 7 |
| 6 | Grant Birchall | Hawthorn | 5 |
| 7 | Michael Rischitelli | Brisbane Lions | 1 |
| 7 | Dale Thomas | Collingwood | 1 |
Source: AFL Record Season Guide 2015
