= Austin Wonaeamirri =

Australian rules footballer

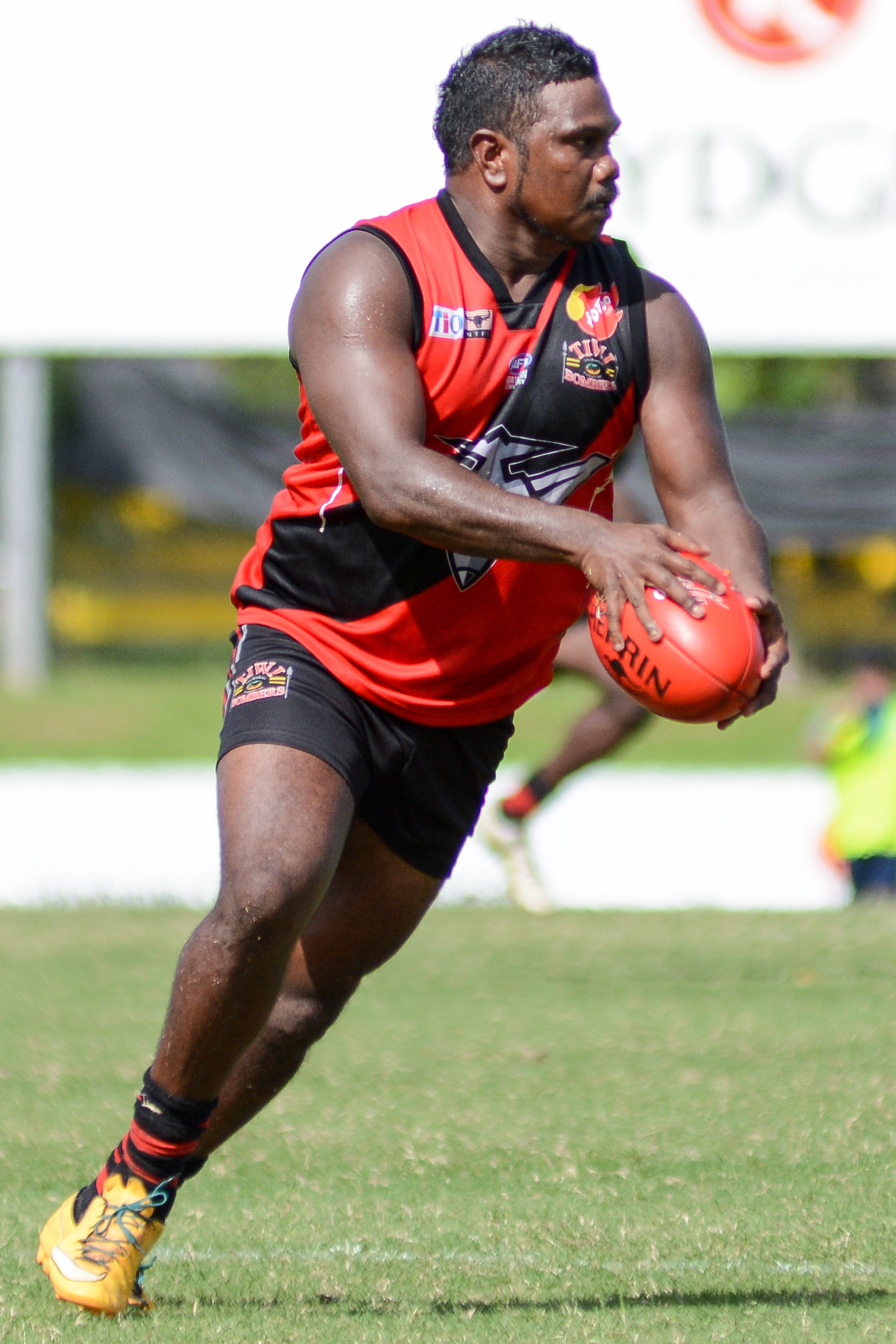
- Austin Wonaeamirri playing for the Tiwi Bombers in February 2016

Personal information
- Full name: Austin Wonaeamirri
- Born: 2 October 1988 (age 38); Milikapiti, Melville Island, Northern Territory
- Original team: St Mary's Football Club (NTFL)
- Draft: 19th overall, 2007 AFL Rookie Draft; Melbourne
- Position: Forward pocket

Playing career^{1}
Years	Club	Games (Goals)
2008–2011	Melbourne	31 (37)
- ^{1} Playing statistics correct to the end of 2011.

Career highlights
- U/18 indigenous tour to South Africa, 2006; AFL U/18 National Championships (Northern Territory), 2007; U/18 Northern Territory best player, 2007; AFL Rising Star Nominee, 2008

Austin Wonaeamirri (born 2 October 1988) is a professional Australian rules football player of indigenous (Tiwi) origin. He previously played for the Melbourne Football Club in the Australian Football League (AFL).

== Early life ==
Wonaeamirri was born and grew up on the Tiwi Islands in the remote community of Snake Bay and Milikapiti, on Melville Island. He began playing football at the age of six and as a junior, he for Muluwurri Magpies in the Tiwi Islands Football League, and was also a young member of the club's senior side. He lost his mother at the age of 12 and was brought up by his father, Matthew.

Wonaeamirri played senior football in both the TIFL and the Northern Territory Football League in Darwin, Northern Territory, where he was a junior star for the St Mary's Football Club.

He was named in the inaugural list of the Tiwi Bombers, as one of their youngest stars. He was a solid contributor for the Bombers during the record thrashing of Rumbalara Football Club in their historic encounter at the Melbourne Cricket Ground as a curtainraiser to the "Dreamtime at the 'G" match between the Essendon Bombers and Richmond Tigers.

After being overlooked in the 2006 AFL draft, Wonaeamirri moved to Adelaide in South Australia to play in the SANFL for the Norwood Football Club to increase his chances of being drafted from a more competitive league.

That year he represented Australia's indigenous youth on tour to South Africa with the "Flying Boomerangs" to play against the South Africa's Buffaloes.

After a solid season with Norwood, he nominated for the AFL draft later that year.

After strong performances in the 2007 AFL Under 18 Championships for the Northern Territory where he was voted the Territory's best player at the tournament, he attracted the interest of talent scouts.

== AFL career ==
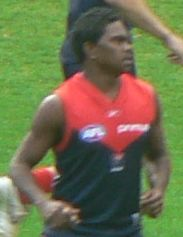

The small crumbing forward was tipped by some to be selected in the national draft with his pace and ability to apply forward line pressure, run down opponents, ballwinning ability and skills on both sides of the body being a feature of his game. Some were critical of him being slightly overweight for an AFL footballer, while his short stature may have put some clubs off. Others likened him to the Davey brothers, and in particular, the shorter but speedy Essendon Football Club star Alwyn Davey, the brother of Melbourne's forward-cum-midfielder Aaron Davey. Despite these things the Melbourne Demons picked him up in the 2007 Rookie draft.

He joined Aaron Davey and Matthew Whelan as current Melbourne Demons players from Darwin.

An injury to Jack Grimes which put him on the long-term injury list paved the way for Wonaeamirri to debut in round 3, 2008 against Geelong. With eight kicks and four tackles, the short forward did enough to earn him a spot and play consecutive matches in the next few games. In his second game against North Melbourne, he was impressive, kicking two goals. Against the Brisbane Lions at the Brisbane Cricket Ground, Wonaeamirri also starred with three goals.

The breakthrough for Wonaeamirri was his four goals in the stirring round 7 come-from-behind victory against the Fremantle at the Melbourne Cricket Ground. One of his goals was at a critical point in the game, helping his team steal the lead for the first time in the game and for good. His final quarter produced a total of three goals, when the game was still in the balance. With his enthusiastic celebrations he established himself as a cult figure, with many nicknaming him "Aussie" and "Wonna". He picked up an AFL Rising Star Award nomination for his outstanding performance against the Dockers. He would ultimately receive one vote to finish tenth for the award.

In just his first season with Melbourne, he finished second in the club goalkicking for the year behind Brad Miller.

In the off-season, Wonaeamirri returned to Bathurst Island for the first time since the AFL season where he was held with celebrity status.

In 2009, Wonaeamirri chose to change from guernsey number 39 to 33, a number previously worn by indigenous idols Jeff Farmer and Byron Pickett. He lost weight and was selected for the Indigenous All-Stars to play against the Adelaide Crows, where he kicked two goals and was named among the best for the side.

Wonaeamirri had a poor 2011 season, partially due to his father's death in May, which derailed his pre-season. He took time off and returned home to the Tiwi Islands before returning to Melbourne midway through the season and managing to play five matches. At season's end, new coach Mark Neeld decided to delist Wonaeamirri.

== Personal life ==
Austin Wonaeamirri likes to return to his home in Tiwi Islands as much as possible. In his free time, he enjoys talking to locals in the community, seeing friends and making kangaroo stews. But it is his passion for hunting sea turtles including flatback turtle that has inspired his nickname Austin "Turtle" Wonaeamirri within football circles. Coach Dean Bailey raised concerns about Austin's passion for turtle meat which dietitians have said has a high fat content.

Wonaeamirri's favourite food is magpie goose.
