= Clint Bartram =

Australian rules footballer

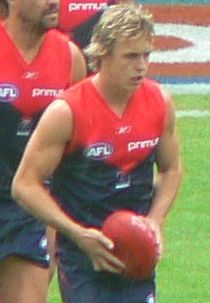

Personal information
- Full name: Clinton Bartram
- Born: 16 February 1988 (age 38)
- Original team: Geelong Falcons (TAC Cup)
- Draft: No. 60, 2005 National Draft, Melbourne
- Height: 184 cm (6 ft 0 in)
- Weight: 82 kg (181 lb)
- Position: Defender

Playing career^{1}
| Years | Club | Games (Goals) |
| 2006–2012 | Melbourne | 103 (17) |
- ^{1} Playing statistics correct to the end of 2012.

Career highlights
- 2006 AFL Rising Star nominee; 2006 Harold Ball Memorial Trophy

Clinton "Clint" Bartram (born 18 February 1988) is a former professional Australian rules footballer who played for the Melbourne Football Club in the Australian Football League (AFL). He was recruited from the Geelong Falcons, after growing up in Leopold. Bartram was recruited by Melbourne at pick 60 in the 2005 AFL National Draft.

Bartram is a small (183 cm), running midfield/defender player who was used as a tagger in the 2006 season. He made his debut in round one of the 2006 season against Carlton and kicked a goal in his first match. He then went on to play all 22 home and away matches although did not play a part in the finals series due to an ankle injury suffered in the round 22 loss to Adelaide.

Bartram received a NAB Rising Star nomination for his efforts in 2006 and finished 5th in voting for the award behind Port Adelaide's Danyle Pearce, Richmond's Andrew Raines, Collingwood's Heath Shaw and Carlton's Marc Murphy.

In late 2012, Bartram retired due to a degenerative knee problem.

Early 2019 Clint became the Divisional Franchisor for Jim's Construction
