= Trent Carroll =

Australian rules footballer (born 1978)

Personal information
- Full name: Trent Vernon Carroll
- Born: 28 April 1978 (age 48)
- Original team: Claremont (WAFL)
- Debut: Round 9, 24 May 1997, Fremantle vs. Carlton, at Optus Oval

Playing career^{1}
Years	Club	Games (Goals)
1997–2000	Fremantle	33 (1)
2001–2004	West Coast	45 (6)
Total		78 (7)
- ^{1} Playing statistics correct to the end of 2004.

Trent Vernon Carroll (born 28 April 1978) is an Australian rules footballer. He played as a full back and began his senior football career at Claremont in the WAFL. He is the older brother of former Melbourne defender Nathan Carroll.

== Fremantle career ==
Trent was drafted in the 1995 AFL draft as a zone selection from Claremont by former Claremont coach and then Fremantle coach Gerard Neesham. After spending 1996 at Claremont, Carroll made his AFL debut in 1997. He played his first match against Carlton, but never fully secured a position in the Fremantle defence, playing 6, 13 and 14 games in 1997, 1998 and 1999. With a change of coach in 1999, Carroll's position in the team was further in doubt and he was delisted after not playing a senior game in 2000. He wore the number 46 guernsey in 1997 and 1998 before switching to #22 in 1999.

== West Coast career ==
Carroll was drafted by West Coast with selection No.45 in the 2000 AFL draft, a selection obtained result of the deal which saw Mitchell White head to Geelong. Also secured in that trade were Essendon defender Michael Prior and Richmond forward Mark Merenda. In his first season with West Coast he played 19 matches and was asked to perform some important roles in key defensive posts against some of the game's biggest names. However, he was restricted to just four games in 2002. He struggled initially to deal with his non-selection and his form at Claremont was little better than average. But in the second half of the 2002 season he forced his way back into the team and only an ankle injury at training prevented him from playing in key matches against the Kangaroos and Essendon late in the season. In 2003 he regained his place as a regular player and tackled some of the game's outstanding forwards, but struggled to cement his place in the side in 2004 and was delisted at season's end. He wore the number 46 guernsey in each season that he was at the Eagles.

== Post-football career ==
After retiring from football, Carroll moved to Margaret River to study oenology and to work for a winemaker.
