= Mount Gravatt Football Club =

Mount Gravatt

Names
- Full name: Mount Gravatt Australian Football Club
- Nickname(s): Vultures, Mounties

2026 QAFL season
- Home-and-away season: 13th (Wooden Spooners)

Club details
- Founded: 1964; 62 years ago
- Colours
- Competition: QAFL
- President: Mark Warwick
- Coach: Todd Carbone
- Captain: Austin Brent
- Premierships: QAFL: 2 (2002, 2007)
- Ground: Southside Toyota Oval (Ron McLennan Oval), Part of the Dittmar Park complex (2,000)

Uniforms
Home

Other information
- Official website: mtgafc.com

The Mount Gravatt Australian Football Club, nicknamed the Vultures, is an Australian rules football club which competed in the North East Australian Football League competition from 2011 to 2013 and as of 2014 is a member club of the Queensland Australian Football League., formed in 1964.

== History ==
=== SQAFA/BAFL ===
The club was a member of the SQAFA since the early 1970s, It won premierships in 1971, 1972, 1974 and 1983.

=== QAFL ===
The club had been affiliated with AFL Queensland since 1994. The club won premiership in 2002 & 2007, whilst being runners up in 1996, 1997, 2003 and 2009.

=== NEAFL ===
The club is a founding member of the competition, Its first season it finished second on the ladder and lost the Preliminary Final.

== Club song ==
The club song is sung to the tune of Along the Road to Gundagai.

We’re a team, what a team
We’re the best you've ever seen
We are the boys/girls from Vultureland
While the others keep on trying
We'll have the flag a flying
Up on Mt Gravatt
We’re the team in the finals
That's where we will be
Leaving other teams behind us
Amazed at our speed
Blue and White is our pride
And we'll battle side by side
We are the boys/girls from Vultureland!

== AFL/VFL players ==
These are the list of past and present Mount Gravatt players who have played at AFL/VFL level:

- Rohan Bail – Melbourne
- Clay Cameron – Gold Coast
- Jarrod Cotton – Port Adelaide
- Michael Gibson – Fitzroy and Brisbane Bears
- Will Hamill – Brisbane Lions
- Shaun Hampson – Carlton and Richmond
- Ben Hudson – Adelaide, Western Bulldogs, Brisbane Lions and Collingwood
- Stephen Kenna – Carlton
- Tony Lynn – Brisbane Bears and Carlton
- Joel Macdonald – Brisbane Lions and Melbourne
- Brad Miller – Melbourne and Richmond
- Neville Miller – South Melbourne
- Shane Morrison – Brisbane Lions and Richmond
- Ken Peucker – Essendon
- Albert Proud – Brisbane Lions
- Archie Smith – Brisbane Lions
- Darryl White – Brisbane Bears and Brisbane Lions
- Derek Wirth – Brisbane Lions

== Premierships (2) ==
No.	Year	Competition	Opponent	Score	Venue
1	2002	QAFL	Southport Sharks	20.11 (131) – 10.10 (70)	Giffin Park
2	2007	QAFL	Southport Sharks	16.12 (108) – 10.10 (70)	Carrara Stadium

== Individual honours ==
Grogan Medal

The Grogan Medal is the highest individual honour a single player can win in the Queensland state league. Votes are awarded by the umpires to the best and fairest players of each game. The Grogan Medal is Queensland equivalent to the AFL's Brownlow Medal.

Mount Gravatt has three Grogan Medallists. The first, in 1999, was won by the captain, Brad Jones. The second was by another captain, Mick Stinear in 2004. This was a remarkable effort considering the vultures finished 5th for the season. In 2019 Frazer Neate claimed top honours at the 74th Grogan Medal count.

Joe Grant Medal

The Joe Grant Medal is awarded to the player judged best on field in a grand final. Mount Gravatt has two Joe Grant Medallists. The first was Tony Lynn in the 2002 grand final victory, and the second was Ash Evans in the 2007 grand final victory.

Ray Hughson Medal

The Ray Hughson Medal is awarded to the QAFL leading goal kicker at the end of the year. Mount Gravatt has one Ray Hughson Medallist: Shane Dupuy, who kicked 80 goals in the 1996 season.
