= Brad Miller (footballer) =

Australian rules footballer (born 1983)

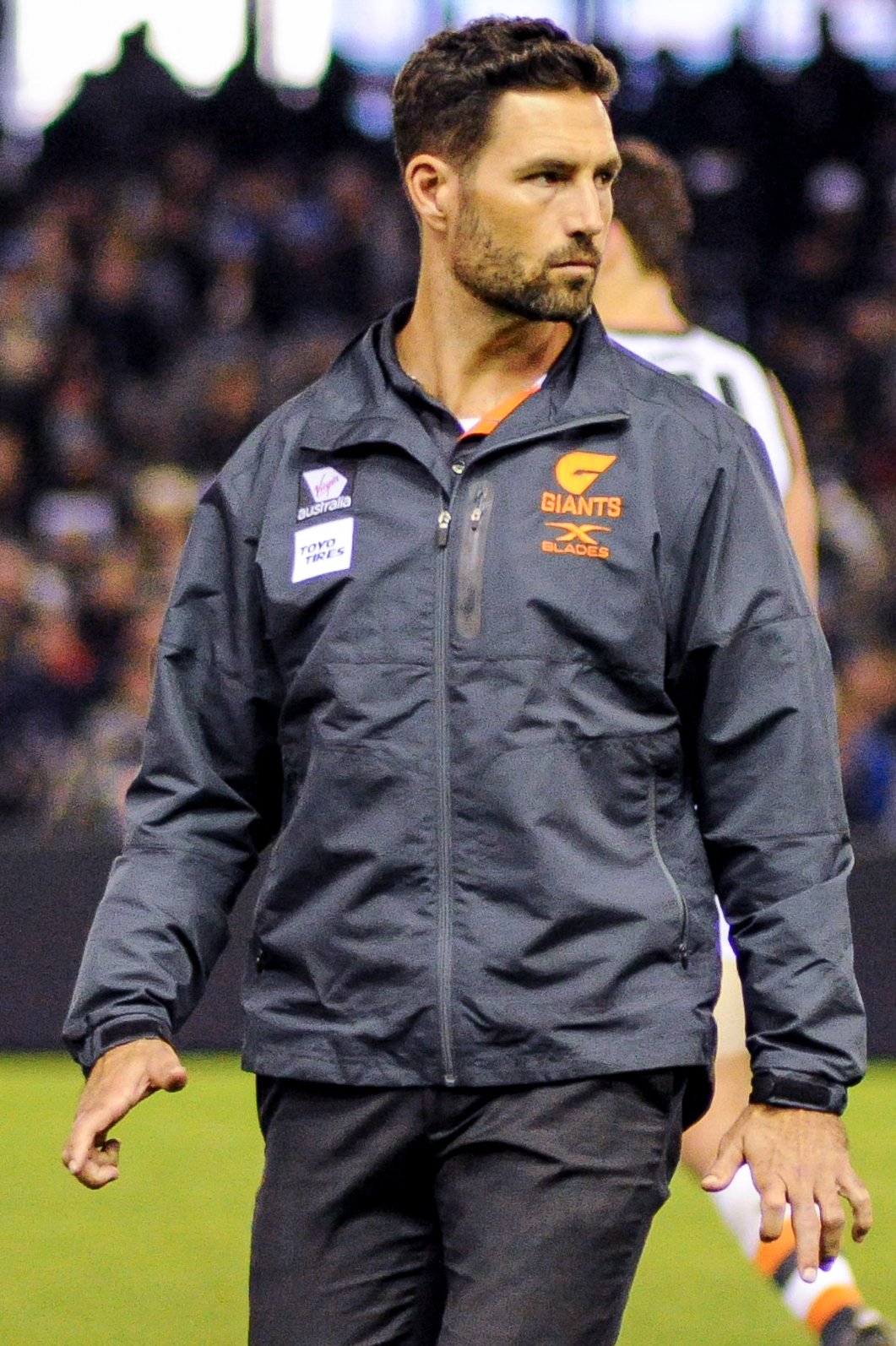
- Miller in June 2017

Personal information
- Full name: Brad Miller
- Born: 6 July 1983 (age 43); Hobart, Tasmania
- Original team: Mount Gravatt (QAFL)
- Draft: No. 55, 2001 National Draft, Melbourne; No. 28, 2010 Rookie Draft, Richmond
- Height: 194 cm (6 ft 4 in)
- Weight: 96 kg (212 lb)
- Position: Utility

Playing career^{1}
Years	Club	Games (Goals)
2002–2010	Melbourne	133 (89)
2011–2012	Richmond	24 (31)
Total		157 (120)
- ^{1} Playing statistics correct to the end of 2012.

Career highlights
- Melbourne leading goalkicker 2008

Brad Miller (born 6 July 1983) is a former professional Australian rules football player who played for the Melbourne Football Club and Richmond Football Club in the Australian Football League (AFL).

== Early life ==
Miller was born in Hobart and spent the early part of his childhood in Sandy Bay before relocating to Brisbane with his family at an early age. He is the son of Neville Miller, who played 28 VFL games for the South Melbourne Football Club in the 1970s. Brad played junior rugby league while based in Brisbane and on his father's advice, he later tried Australian rules football, ending up at the Mount Gravatt Football Club, where he was scouted by AFL club the Melbourne Demons.

== AFL career ==
=== Melbourne ===
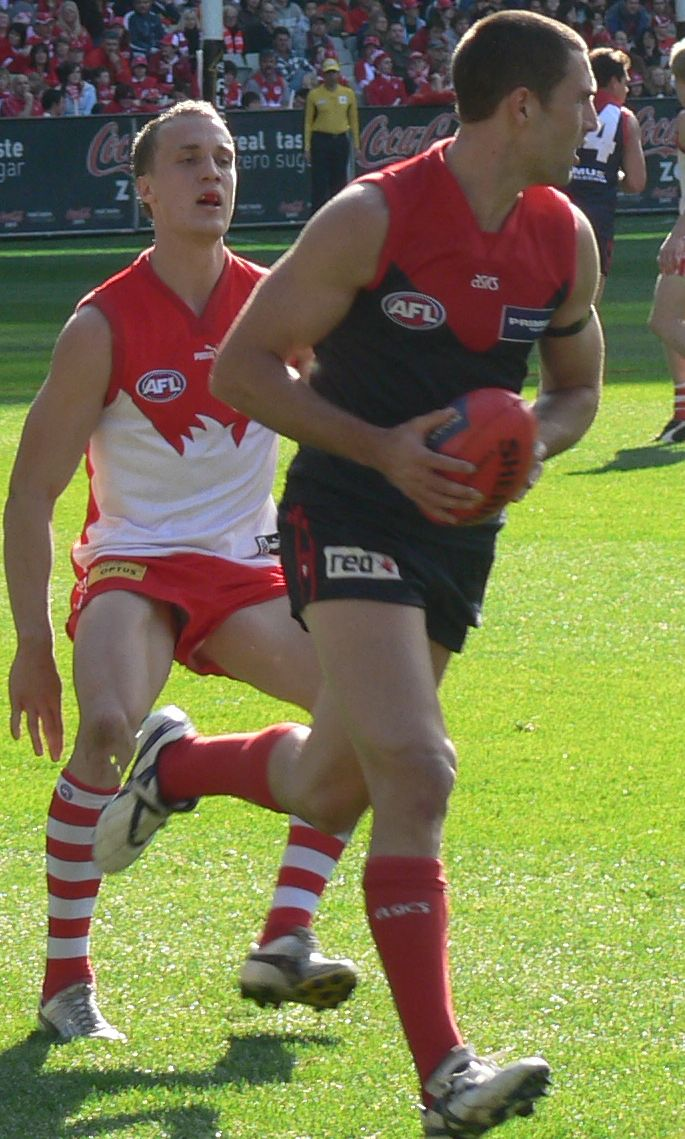
Miller in action in 2006

Picked at number 55 in the 2001 AFL draft, Miller carried a reputation and promise of becoming a key position centre half forward in the mould of Wayne Carey or Jonathan Brown. However he spent much of his early career in defence and did not kick a goal until his 17th game.

At the Demons, Miller struggled early to reach his potential at centre half forward, showing promise with 2 goal hauls and taking strong marks, but poor decision making and kicking skills often resulted in turnovers. In some games but with a reputation for disgressions that ended with tribunal appearances and suspensions. A maximum kicking distance of just under 50 metres made Miller an unlikely option for centre half forward.

At times, he was used by coach Neale Daniher in defence, and held down big key opposition forwards like Barry Hall, but was ultimately a second choice in defence behind Nathan Carroll and Ben Holland.

In a game against Richmond in round 17 of 2004, he kicked a rare bag of four goals. He had previously never kicked more than a goal a game.

A slump in form in 2006, saw him play most of the season for the Sandringham Zebras, including an appearance in their premiership side.

While he was still fairly early in his career, the media began speculating that he might be traded to the Brisbane Lions for Jason Akermanis so that Miller could return to his home of Queensland.

When he did return to the senior Demons lineup just before the finals, he was involved in a collision that led to Geelong player Tom Lonergan losing one of his kidneys.

Miller played a best on ground performance in the Demons losing finals game against the Fremantle Dockers in Perth in an impressive performance. Many believe that this saved him from being traded in the pre-season draft.

Miller played what was possibly his best game at the club in Round 7 of the 2008 Season against Fremantle at the MCG.

After the retirement of David Neitz and Achilles tendon injury to Russell Robertson, coach Dean Bailey tried a number of options at full forward in a forward line which struggled to kick goals before eventually entrusting the role to Miller. Miller had an immediate impact with bags of 3 goals against Richmond, the Western Bulldogs and North Melbourne. He had also shown an impressive increase in goalkicking accuracy.

He came of age when he kicked the winning goal in a career high four goal haul against the Brisbane Lions in round 14.

Miller finished the year with 26 goals. The fact that this was the highest total by a Melbourne player in 2008 highlighted their forward line struggles.

In 2010, Miller lined up for the round 1 clash versus Hawthorn but was subsequently dropped the next week following the teams poor performance, he would not return to the seniors until round 9 against Port Adelaide at TIO stadium in Darwin. Miller kicked five goals, helping the team win a thrilling match by one point in high humidity conditions. Miller struggled to remain in the senior team and was eventually dropped back to the VFL where he played out the rest of the season.

In Round 15 in a VFL match against Gold Coast Suns, Miller sparked the side with six goals in the third quarter. He finished with 10.4 for the afternoon and his team, Casey, won the match by four points.

On 23 August 2010, Brad Miller, alongside teammate Daniel Bell, were delisted by the Melbourne Football Club. However, Miller was the highest polling Melbourne player in the Casey Scorpions Best and Fairest and several clubs, including the new Gold Coast Football Club and the Richmond Football Club both expressed interest in recruiting him.

=== Richmond ===
Richmond picked up Brad Miller with pick 28 in the Rookie Draft on 7 December 2010.

On 16 August 2012, Miller, along with Tigers teammate Kelvin Moore, announced his retirement, effective immediately, due to a calf injury. He left Richmond, having played 157 AFL games (133 with Melbourne, 24 with Richmond) and having booted 120 goals. (89 with Melbourne, 31 with Richmond).
