= Tony Lynn =

Australian rules footballer (born 1968)

Personal information
- Full name: Tony Lynn
- Born: 29 April 1968 (age 58)
- Original team: Morningside
- Height: 178 cm (5 ft 10 in)
- Weight: 78 kg (172 lb)

Playing career^{1}
Years	Club	Games (Goals)
1988	Brisbane Bears	6 (5)
1994–96	Carlton	27 (14)
Total		33 (19)
- ^{1} Playing statistics correct to the end of 1996.

Tony Lynn (born 29 April 1968) is a former Australian rules footballer who played with the Brisbane Bears and Carlton in the Victorian/Australian Football League (VFL/AFL).

A Queenslander, Lynn was raised in Beenleigh (Logan City) in Brisbane played both junior and senior football at Mt Gravatt and Morningside clubs until being recruited to Brisbane for their second VFL season in 1988. He kicked four goals in a win over Richmond could only manage six games for Brisbane before succumbing to a knee injury.

Lynn, a utility, returned to Morningside in 1989 and then joined Central District in the South Australian National Football League with whom he would make over 80 appearances and win a 'Best and Fairest' in 1992.

In 1993 he won a Fos Williams Medal for his performance for South Australia in an interstate match against Western Australia. He also represented a combined Northern Territory and Queensland interstate team the same year, in a win over Tasmania in Hobart. His efforts caught the eyes of the Carlton recruiters and he made a return to the AFL in 1994 after being picked up in the mid-season draft.

Carlton used Lynn as a back pocket and he played 20 games in his first season, including a Qualifying Final. He made another six appearances in 1995 as Carlton went on to win the premiership but Lynn didn't participate in any finals.

He finished his career back in Queensland, rejoining Morningside in 1997 but ending up at Mount Gravatt. In Mt Gravatt's 2002 Grand Final win over Southport, Lynn won the Joe Grant Medal as 'best on field' and announced his retirement. Lynn now iis a 3 times premiership coach at Mayne tigers.
