= Paul Wheatley (footballer) =

Australian rules footballer

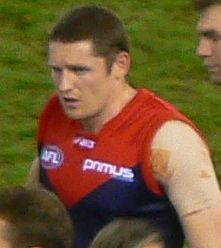
- Wheatley in 2007

Personal information
- Full name: Paul Wheatley
- Born: 12 April 1981 (age 45)
- Original team: Preston Knights
- Draft: 20th overall, 1999 AFL draft
- Height: 189 cm (6 ft 2 in)
- Weight: 88 kg (194 lb)
- Position: Defender

Playing career^{1}
Years	Club	Games (Goals)
2000–2009	Melbourne	135 (34)
- ^{1} Playing statistics correct to the end of 2009.

Paul Wheatley (born 12 April 1981) is a former Australian rules footballer who played in the Australian Football League (AFL).

A Preston Knights recruit, Wheatley made his debut for the Melbourne Football Club in 2000, after being selected at number 20 in the 1999 AFL draft.

Wheatley is known for his prodigious kicking, with his ability to pinpoint 60 metre passes using the drop punt. He is also known to be able to kick long distance torpedo punts, which led to speculation that he might try out as an American football punter. Paul polled two votes in the 2007 Brownlow Medal, his first votes, and five votes in 2008, a career high. He has the record in the NAB Cup with the most goals scored outside of 50 m.

Wheatley announced his retirement from the game and played his last match against St Kilda with Matthew Whelan in round 22, 2009. Wheatley played 135 games and kicked 34 goals. Wheatley stated that he intends to nominate for the pre-season draft and failing being picked up by another club will seek a trial in the NFL.
