= Neville Miller (footballer) =

Australian rules footballer

Personal information
- Full name: Neville John Miller
- Born: 29 September 1951 (age 75)
- Original team: Wagga Wagga
- Height: 187 cm (6 ft 2 in)
- Weight: 86 kg (190 lb)
- Position: Forward

Playing career^{1}
Years	Club	Games (Goals)
1970–1972	South Melbourne	28 (24)
- ^{1} Playing statistics correct to the end of 1972.

Neville John Miller (born 29 September 1951) is a former Australian rules footballer who played with South Melbourne in the Victorian Football League (VFL).

== Career ==
Miller, a forward, was recruited to South Melbourne from Wagga Wagga and began his career in the 1970 VFL season, under coach Norm Smith. On debut against Collingwood in round 11, Miller went off injured in the first quarter with a gashed knee, which required 23 stitches. He finished the season with six appearances. In 1971 he played 12 games, including a hoodoo breaking win over Essendon at Windy Hill, in which he contributed a career best five goals. It was the first time South Melbourne had beaten Essendon at their home ground since 1954. He played one further season for South Melbourne, with 10 appearances in 1972.

In 1973 he left South Melbourne to play for West Adelaide in the South Australian National Football League. Following his stint with West Adelaide, Miller played in Tasmania for six years with Sandy Bay and was a member of three premiership teams. During the 1980s he moved to Queensland where he played for Mt Gravatt and has since had a long coaching career in the state. He now coaches the Mayne reserves.

== Personal life ==
Miller is the father of former Melbourne and Richmond footballer Brad Miller.
