= Michael Newton (footballer) =

Australian rules footballer (born 1987)

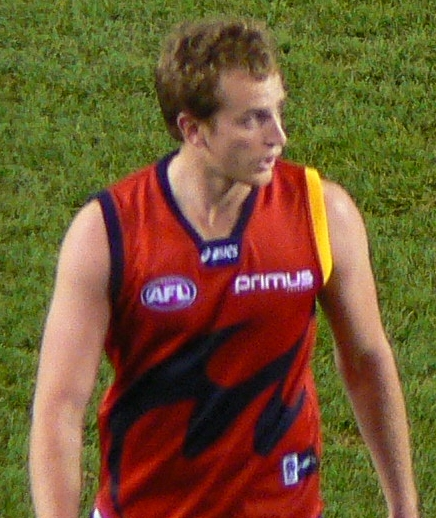

Personal information
- Full name: Michael Newton
- Nickname: Juice
- Born: 27 April 1987 (age 39)
- Original teams: Whorouly, Murray Bushrangers (TAC Cup)
- Draft: No. 43, 2004 National Draft, Melbourne
- Height: 193 cm (6 ft 4 in)
- Weight: 91 kg (201 lb)
- Position: Forward

Playing career^{1}
Years	Club	Games (Goals)
2005–2011	Melbourne	28 (35)
- ^{1} Playing statistics correct to the end of 2011.

Career highlights
- AFL Mark of the Year 2007; 3x Norwood premiership player.

Michael Newton (born 27 April 1987) is an Australian rules footballer who played for Melbourne in the Australian Football League (AFL) and the Norwood Football Club in the SANFL.

== Career ==
Originally from Whorouly, Newton was taken at pick 43 in the 2004 AFL draft. He was given plenty of time to mature in the Victorian Football League at the Sandringham Football Club where he had kicked big bags of goals on a number of occasions and before debuting for the Demons in 2007 in Round 13 in Neale Daniher's final game as coach.

With a knee injury to David Neitz, Newton was required to be a stand in full forward and subsequently played successive games, kicking a goal in his first game and scoring an impressive three goals against Carlton. Having an impressive debut season, he took the 2007 Mark of the year, marking high above a pack, resting on David Neitz's head.

Quickly gathering a cult following amongst Demons fans due to his high-marking, Newton now receives shouts of 'Juice' upon every disposal. His nickname was influenced by 1970s American pop and country singer Juice Newton, who also provided the same nickname for former Melbourne player Leigh Newton during his brief career in 1997.

Newton's 2008 season was dominated by a knee injury. After kicking one goal in round 1 against Hawthorn, Newton was dropped to the VFL to play for Melbourne's previously affiliated club, Sandringham, which is where he picked up the injury. Newton returned for Melbourne in the AFL late in the 2008 season and was in and out in 2009, although after being dropped to the VFL, Newton responded by booting 5 goals for Casey Scorpions.

Newton managed five games in 2009 for 60 disposals and kicked six goals. He then played only four games in 2010.

Newton was delisted by Melbourne at the end of the 2011 season.

Newton played for Norwood in the SANFL from 2012 to 2015. He played 8 league games in 2012 before rupturing his ACL, requiring a full knee reconstruction, in which he missed out on playing in Norwood's Premiership win over West Adelaide.

Newton enjoyed a stellar 2014 season, proving to be a dangerous option up forward, booting 57 goals for the season. He was a part of the 2014 premiership team, which was the third premiership in a row for the Redlegs.

Newton now plays for Wangaratta Magpies Football Club in the Ovens and Murray Football Netball League.

He kicked eight goals in the 2017 senior football grand final to defeat Albury Tigers by 21 points and was awarded the Did Simpson Medal for best on ground.
