= Corey Jones =

Australian rules footballer

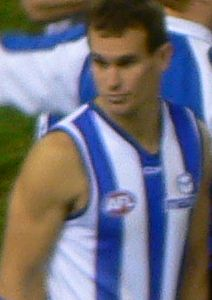
- Playing for North in the 2007 AFL season

Personal information
- Full name: Corey Jones
- Born: 26 February 1981 (age 45)
- Original team: Sturt (SANFL)
- Draft: 60th overall, 2000 AFL draft
- Height: 188 cm (6 ft 2 in)
- Weight: 87 kg (192 lb)
- Position: Small forward

Playing career^{1}
Years	Club	Games (Goals)
2001–2010	North Melbourne	157 (216)
- ^{1} Playing statistics correct to the end of 2010.

Career highlights
- North Melbourne leading goalkicker: 2007 (47)

Corey Jones (born 26 February 1981) is a former Australian rules footballer who played for the North Melbourne Kangaroos in the Australian Football League. Jones grew up in the small Victorian town of Wycheproof, near Bendigo.

== Career ==
Jones was drafted with the 60th selection in the 2000 AFL draft from Sturt in the South Australian National Football League (SANFL). He made his AFL debut in round 4 of 2001 and played a total of 12 games for the season.

Jones had his best year up to date in 2007. The Roos finished 3rd on the ladder at the end of the home and away season and Jones kicked 46 goals for the year, including a bag of seven against Hawthorn in Round 17 at Aurora Stadium, to be the club's leading goal scorer for the year. He has also kicked multiple bags of four goals during the year and bags of three. Jones did not play in the finals series, ruled out with a broken foot that was niggling him all of the second half of the season.

Jones started his 2008 season horribly, receiving a concussion in the first quarter of the season thanks to Nathan Thompson's knee driving into his forehead. In Round 2 Jones bounced back well against Richmond at the MCG. Jones kicked four first quarter goals on his way to a seven-goal haul for the second time in his career.

By the end of the season, however, Jones was offered up for trade prior to the 2008 AFL draft; however no suitable trade was able to be made and Jones remained at North Melbourne. However, he only played one game in the first half of the 2009 season, with a rift with coach Dean Laidley blamed for his demotion to the reserves team, North Ballarat. After Laidley resigned and Darren Crocker took over as the caretaker coach, Jones played in nine of the remaining eleven matches.

In August 2010, having played only senior match for the season, Jones announced his retirement. North Melbourne gave Jones a farewell match, though coach Brad Scott insisted that Jones had earned his spot in the team.

== Return to Country Football ==
Following his retirement from AFL, Corey returned to play with his home club, Wycheproof-Narraport, where they would go on to make finals for both years of his tenure at the club. It is reported that Corey has signed a 2-year contract with Bendigo Football League side, Golden Square, as a playing Development Coach
