= Athol Webb =

Australian rules footballer (1935–2026)

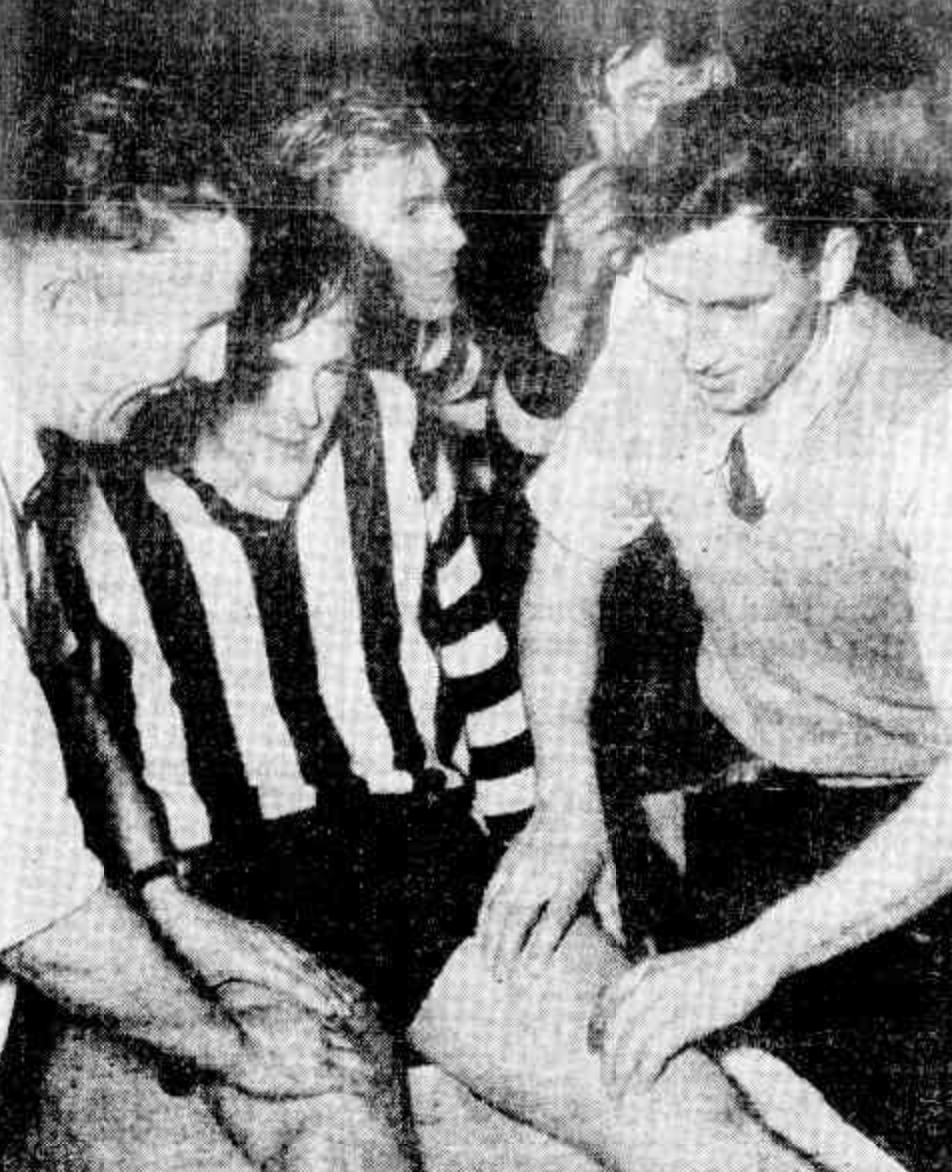
- Webb (second from left) in 1954

Personal information
- Born: 13 September 1935
- Died: 7 January 2026 (aged 90)
- Original team: Scottsdale (NTFA)
- Height: 180 cm (5 ft 11 in)
- Weight: 80 kg (176 lb)

Playing career
| Years | Club | Games (Goals) |
| 1955–1959 | Melbourne | 74 (146) |

Athol John Webb (13 September 1935 – 7 January 2026) was an Australian rules footballer who played for the Melbourne Football Club in the Victorian Football League (VFL) during the late 1950s.

A small forward, Webb was a premiership player with Melbourne in 1956 and 1957. He kicked five goals in the 1956 VFL Grand Final win and topped the club's goalkicking in the 1957 VFL premiership season with 56 goals. He represented both Victoria and his home state of Tasmania at interstate football.

Webb was captain–coach of the Norfolk Football Club from 1960 to 1961, then with East Launceston Football Club in 1962–63 in the NTFA. Webb was then enticed to Sydney as captain coach of Western Suburbs from 1964 to 1966, which included their 1965 Sydney Football League premiership.

Webb moved onto coach The Rock Yerong Creek Football Club from 1967 to 1969 in the Farrer Football League, then stayed on for six more years as a player.

Webb died on 7 January 2026 at the age of 90.
