= Josh Hill (footballer) =

Australian rules footballer

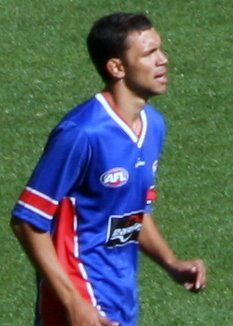

Personal information
- Full name: Joshua Hill
- Born: 19 January 1989 (age 37); Subiaco, Western Australia, Australia
- Original team: Claremont (WAFL)
- Draft: 61st overall, 2006 National Draft (Western Bulldogs)
- Height: 185 cm (6 ft 1 in)
- Weight: 86 kg (190 lb)
- Position: Forward

Playing career^{1}
Years	Club	Games (Goals)
2007–2011	Western Bulldogs	66 (75)
2012–2017	West Coast	107 (151)
Total		173 (226)

Representative team honours^{2}
Years	Team	Games (Goals)
2009	Indigenous All-Stars	1 (0)
- ^{1} Playing statistics correct to the end of 2017.^{2} Representative statistics correct as of 2009.

Career highlights
- AFL Rising Star nominee 2008; Ross Glendinning Medal - Round 20, 2015; West Coast Grand finalist player 2015

Joshua Hill (born 19 January 1989) is a former professional Australian rules footballer who played for the Western Bulldogs and West Coast Eagles in the Australian Football League (AFL).

== Career ==
Originally from Broome in the Kimberley region of Western Australia, Hill moved to Perth, where he attended Trinity College. He was zoned to Claremont in the West Australian Football League (WAFL), but did not play a senior game for the club.

He was drafted by the Western Bulldogs with selection 61 in the 2006 National Draft, and made his AFL debut in round 17 of the 2007 season against the West Coast Eagles. In round two, 2008, Hill was named the Rising Star nominee. In 2009, Hill played 23 games, kicking 33 goals as a half-forward flanker and forward pocket. Hill struggled for form in 2010 and 2011, playing 24 games between the two seasons, and kicking 26 goals.

Hill was traded to the West Coast Eagles in October 2011 in exchange for the 49th pick overall in the 2011 National Draft. He made his debut for West Coast in round one of the 2012 season, scoring three goals. Hill again kicked three goals in the second round of the season, against Melbourne.

Hill was delisted by West Coast at the conclusion of the 2017 season.

== Personal life ==
Hill is the second cousin of Fremantle's Stephen and St Kilda's Bradley Hill. On 8 August 2020, Hill had his first child with his fiance Jo Duffy. On 13 August 2020, he had his second child with his former girlfriend Kara Wicks. He confirmed that he is indeed the father of both children and vows to honour his responsibilities to both children. In November 2021, Hill and Duffy married in a small private ceremony.

=== Historical child sex crimes ===
On 15 February 2025, Hill faced the Northbridge Court on charges of sexually penetrating a child over 13 and under 16. It’s alleged three of these offences were committed in Broome between 21 and 30 December 2015.
