= Bill Allen (footballer) =

Australian rules footballer

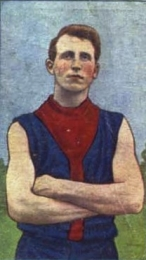
- Allen in 1920

Personal information
- Full name: William Miller Allen
- Born: 7 July 1889; Ballarat, Victoria
- Died: 13 November 1948 (aged 59); Ringwood, Victoria
- Original team: South Yarra
- Height: 188 cm (6 ft 2 in)
- Weight: 85 kg (187 lb)

Playing career^{1}
Years	Club	Games (Goals)
1910–15, 1919–23	Melbourne	142 (54)
- ^{1} Playing statistics correct to the end of 1923.

William Miller Allen (7 July 1889 – 13 November 1948) was an Australian rules footballer who played for Melbourne in the Victorian Football League (VFL).

Allen was a ruckman and played during a dour period for the club. He was with Melbourne from 1910 to 1923 but missed the 1916, 1917 and 1918 seasons due to the war. During the summer of 1914–15 he played a couple of first class cricket matches for Victoria in the Sheffield Shield.

== See also ==
- List of Victoria first-class cricketers
