= Matthew Bate =

Australian rules footballer

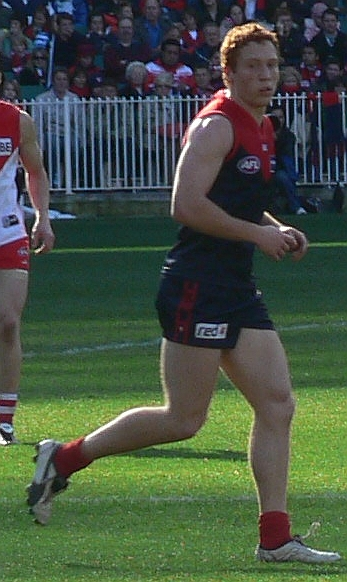

Personal information
- Full name: Matthew Bate
- Born: 24 May 1987 (age 39)
- Original team: Eastern Ranges (TAC Cup)
- Draft: No, 13, 2004 National draft, Melbourne
- Height: 192 cm (6 ft 4 in)
- Weight: 91 kg (201 lb)
- Position: Forward / Midfielder

Playing career
Years	Club	Games (Goals)
2005–2012	Melbourne	102 (98)

Career highlights
- 2006 AFL Rising Star nominee; Morrish Medal 2004

Matthew Bate (born 24 May 1987) is an Australian rules footballer and former player for the Melbourne Football Club in the Australian Football League (AFL). At the conclusion of the 2012 AFL season, he was delisted by the Melbourne Football Club and subsequently drafted to the Essendon Football Club's reserve side in the Victorian Football League (VFL). He wore the number 6 guernsey.

Bate played as a tall forward or midfielder. He won the Morrish Medal as best player in the TAC Cup in 2004. He was drafted 13th overall by Melbourne in the 2004 AFL draft and made his AFL debut in Round 5 of the 2006 season.

Bate's achievements as a senior player included a nomination for the NAB AFL Rising Star award for his performance against Carlton in Round 18 of the 2006 season. In the 2007 season for Melbourne, Bate finished third in the club's Best and Fairest Award (the Keith 'Bluey' Truscott Medal) with 179 votes, behind the winner James McDonald (260 votes) and fellow second season player Nathan Jones (190 Votes). In 2009, he came second in the club's goal kicking.

Having completed his fifth full year of senior AFL football for the Melbourne Demons, Bate appeared to have become an important member of the team who was versatile and could be utilized across half-forward, in the midfield, or at full forward. Bate has been commended for his fine marking, booming kicks and endurance. However, in 2011, he only played nine games for Melbourne, despite showing good form for Casey in the VFL. He finished second in the 2011 J. J. Liston Trophy, awarded to the VFL's best and fairest player.

During Trade Week of 2011, Matthew Bate requested a trade to the Western Bulldogs. However, after Mark Neeld was appointed as Melbourne's new coach he was retained and not traded.
