= Matt Campbell (Australian footballer) =

Australian rules footballer (born 1987)

Personal information
- Full name: Matthew Dylan Campbell
- Born: 21 January 1987 (age 39)
- Original team: North Adelaide (SANFL)
- Height: 170 cm (5 ft 7 in)
- Weight: 72 kg (159 lb)
- Position: Forward

Playing career^{1}
Years	Club	Games (Goals)
2007–2012	North Melbourne	82 (79)

Representative team honours
Years	Team	Games (Goals)
2009	Indigenous All-Stars	1

International team honours
2008	Australia	2
- ^{1} Playing statistics correct to the end of 2011.

Matthew Dylan Campbell (born 21 January 1987) is a former professional Australian rules footballer who played with the North Melbourne Football Club in the Australian Football League from 2006 - 2012.

He is described as being small and lightly framed but is a very fast player with excellent evasive skills.

== Early life ==
Campbell, of Indigenous Australian heritage with tribal ancestry that can be traced to the Arrente, grew up in Alice Springs, Northern Territory.

He began his senior football in 2005 with North Adelaide in the SANFL and played every game with the club in 2006.

Campbell was drafted by the Kangaroos and moved to Melbourne in 2006.

After being dropped from the Kangaroos' list at the end of the 2012 season, Campbell was re-recruited by North Adelaide and returned to the SANFL in 2013.

== North Melbourne career ==
Campbell made his AFL debut for the Kangaroos in Round 1, 2007 against Collingwood. He had a poor game, with only 3 possessions, and was dropped for the following game against Port Adelaide, which would have seen him playing back in his hometown. Round 3 saw him re-selected and gather 12 possessions as well as kicking his first AFL goal. He continued his good form with 13 possessions against the Brisbane Lions, and he kicked 2 goals in Round 5 against Geelong. Despite having only 4 kicks in Round 6 against Sydney, he kicked 3 goals; his third coming late in the final quarter when the Swans had got within four points.

== Return to North Adelaide ==
He then returned to Adelaide to play for his original club North Adelaide for a three-year stint back at the Prospect Oval and then retired at the end of the 2014 SANFL season.
