= Damien Sully =

Australian rules football field umpire

Damien Sully (born 30 October 1974) is an Australian rules football field umpire in the Australian Football League. He has umpired 46 career games in the AFL as of the completion of 2009 AFL season.

Sully was awarded the distinction of VFL Umpire of the Year in 2004 and 2005.

Sully was appointed to the AFL umpiring ranks at the start of the 2006 AFL season as a 31-year-old. The AFL was trialling several candidates for the senior position, and reported Sully had been the standout among the group. He spent seven years in the Victorian Football League ranks, which saw him officiate over 100 games, including two VFL Grand Finals.

== See also ==
- List of Australian rules football umpires
