= Clinton Young =

Australian rules footballer

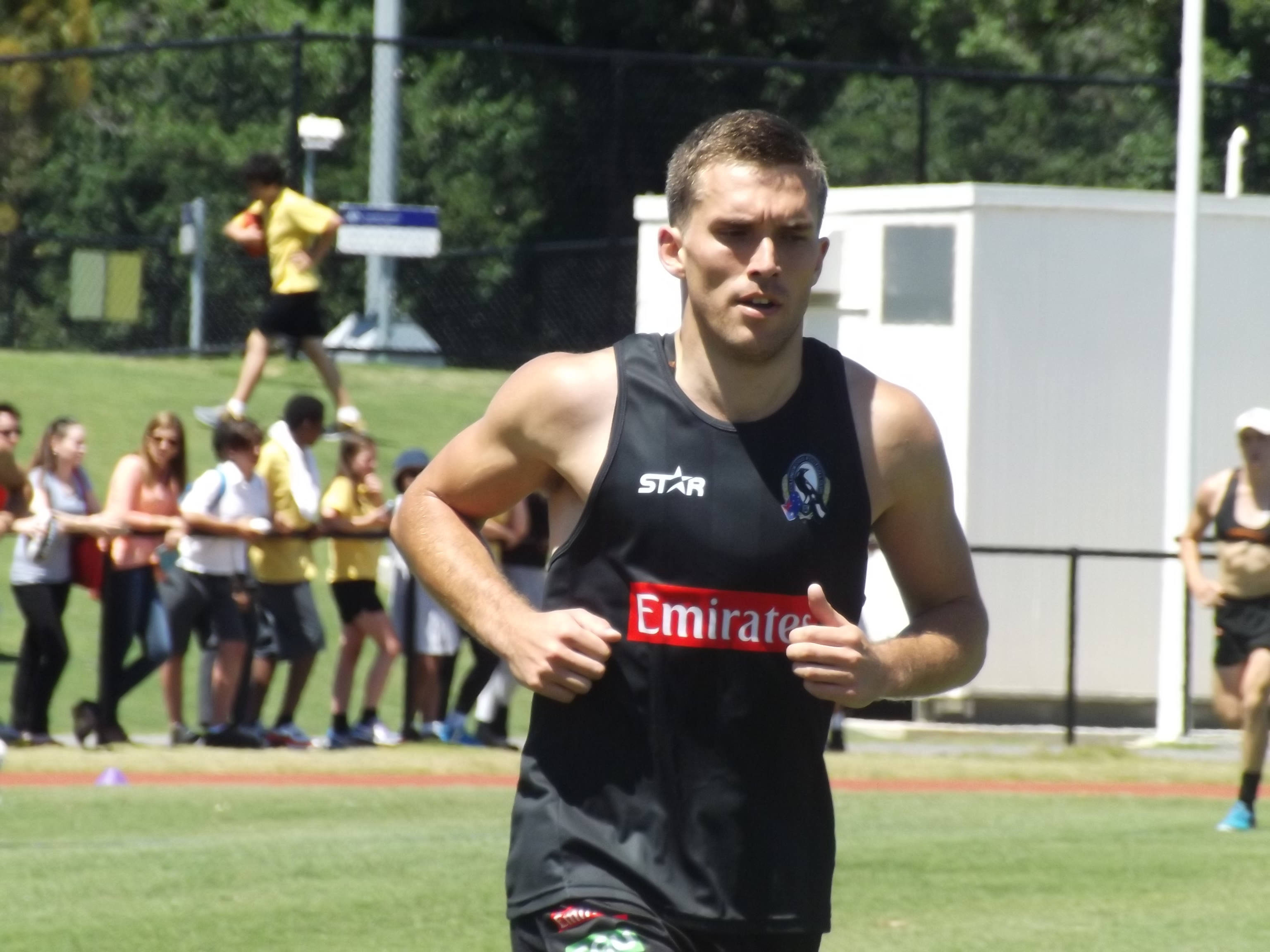
- Young training with Collingwood in 2014

Personal information
- Full name: Clinton Young
- Nickname: "Dasher"
- Born: 16 February 1986 (age 40); Victoria, Australia
- Original teams: Minyip-Murtoa (WFL); North Ballarat Rebels (TAC Cup)
- Draft: No. 18, 2005 rookie draft
- Debut: Round 16, 2005, Hawthorn vs. Kangaroos, at Docklands Stadium
- Height: 189 cm (6 ft 2 in)
- Weight: 87 kg (192 lb)
- Position: Midfielder / Forward

Playing career^{1}
Years	Club	Games (Goals)
2005–2012	Hawthorn	116 (60)
2013–2015	Collingwood	21 (9)
Total		137 (69)
- ^{1} Playing statistics correct to the end of 2015.

Career highlights
- AFL premiership player: 2008; AFL Rising Star nominee: 2006

Clinton Young (born 16 February 1986) is an Australian rules football coach and former player who is currently an assistant coach with the Box Hill Hawks Football Club in the Victorian Football League. As a player, he played with the Hawthorn Football Club and Collingwood Football Club in the Australian Football League. Young was widely considered to be one of the best left foot kicks on the run in the AFL, often kicking in excess of 50 metres.

== Hawthorn ==
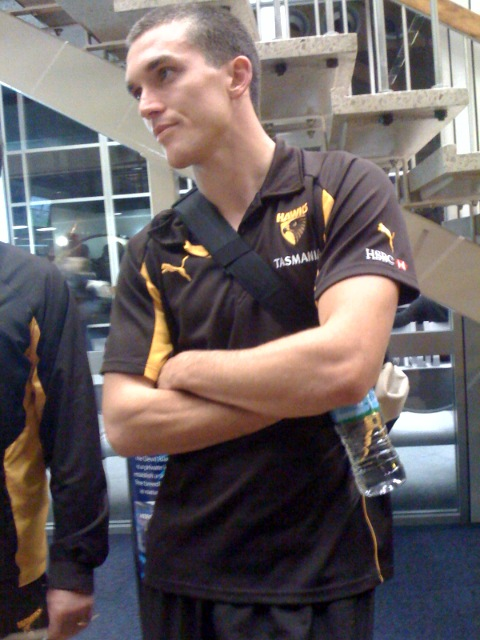
Young with Hawthorn in 2008

He was recruited from Minyip-Murtoa and North Ballarat U18's. Young started the 2005 season on the rookie list, he was promoted to the senior list later that year. Young made his debut at AFL level in Round 16, 2005 for the Hawthorn Football Club. He finished the season with seven games of experience where he showed a lot of potential. In 2006 he played the first seven games of the season, his performance was reasonably consistent during this period. After being out of the side several weeks, Young made a return in Round 12 against Richmond at York Park in Launceston. This was to be his best game for the season as he recorded then career highs of 21 kicks, 24 disposals and 13 marks as his team defeated Richmond comfortably. His 13 marks was equal best on his team.

Young could play on the wing or up forward. His speed and ball skills made him a good wingman whilst his height and kicking ability made him a versatile forward.

He played an important role in the Hawks 2008 Grand Final victory over Geelong where he was the Hawks leading possession getter in the first half before succumbing to an ankle injury early in the third quarter.

Young missed most of the 2009 season with a hip injury. After a lean couple of seasons, in 2012 Young was able to maintain his spot in the Hawthorn team. His last game for the club was in the 2012 AFL Grand Final.

== Collingwood ==
Young became a Collingwood player after leaving the Hawks as an unrestricted free agent. It was the opportunity to play a key role on the wing at Collingwood that saw Young make his decision, and he signed a three-year contract. His first season with the Magpies was ruined by injury. He managed two games in an injury interrupted year. In his second season at Collingwood Young did not lived up to his expectation. He had been up and down and towards the end of the season was playing in the VFL. Young was delisted by Collingwood In September 2015, and announced his official retirement on 29 October.

== Post-AFL ==
After concluding his AFL career, Young played for Gisborne in the Bendigo Football League. He was appointed the club’s coach at the start of 2018.

== Statistics ==
Legend
G	Goals	K	Kicks	D	Disposals	T	Tackles
B	Behinds	H	Handballs	M	Marks

Season	Team	No.	Games	Totals							Averages (per game)							Votes
Season	Team	No.	Games	G	B	K	H	D	M	T	G	B	K	H	D	M	T	Votes
2005	Hawthorn	45	7	4	2	44	14	58	23	16	0.6	0.3	6.3	2.0	8.3	3.3	2.3	0
2006	Hawthorn	45	14	1	4	141	39	180	84	26	0.1	0.3	10.1	2.8	12.9	6.0	1.9	0
2007	Hawthorn	45	23	8	11	303	145	448	166	58	0.3	0.5	13.2	6.3	19.5	7.2	2.5	2
2008^{#}	Hawthorn	11	20	14	6	251	104	355	172	48	0.7	0.3	12.6	5.2	17.8	8.6	2.4	3
2009	Hawthorn	11	5	0	4	39	32	71	23	22	0.0	0.8	7.8	6.4	14.2	4.6	4.4	0
2010	Hawthorn	11	17	15	10	152	67	219	68	57	0.9	0.6	8.9	3.9	12.9	4.0	3.4	0
2011	Hawthorn	11	10	5	10	110	42	152	51	14	0.5	1.0	11.0	4.2	15.2	5.1	1.4	0
2012	Hawthorn	11	20	13	16	267	92	359	98	64	0.7	0.8	13.4	4.6	18.0	4.9	3.2	3
2013	Collingwood	14	2	0	0	17	12	29	8	3	0.0	0.0	8.5	6.0	14.5	4.0	1.5	0
2014	Collingwood	14	19	9	8	210	95	305	99	52	0.5	0.4	11.7	5.3	16.9	5.5	2.9	1
2015	Collingwood	14	0	—	—	—	—	—	—	—	—	—	—	—	—	—	—	0
Career			137	69	71	1534	642	2176	792	360	0.5	0.5	11.3	4.7	16.0	5.8	2.6	9

== Honours and achievements ==
Team

- AFL premiership player (Hawthorn): 2008
- Minor premiership (Hawthorn): 2012

Individual

- AFL Rising Star nominee: 2006

== Family ==
His cousin, Ross Young, is the current captain of the Richmond reserves team in the Victorian Football League.
