= Gary Fila =

Personal information
- Nickname: Gaz
- Born: 18 November 1981 (age 44); Adelaide, South Australia

Umpiring career
Years	League	Role	Games
2007–2008, 2012–2014	AFL	Field Umpire	48
2004–2014	SANFL	Field Umpire	144

Career highlights
- SANFL Grand Finals 2005, 2006, 2010, 2011; SANFL Golden Whistle 2010; AFL Debut 2007

Gary Fila (born 18 November 1981) is an Australian rules football field umpire in the Australian Football League. He umpired in the South Australian National Football League and officiated in the 2005 and 2006 SANFL grand finals.

== Career ==
He made his AFL debut on 30 June 2007, in a match between Fremantle and Carlton at Subiaco Oval.

Fila re-trialed for the AFL and was rewarded with a rookie spot. Whilst this was a step in the right direction, he had to have another successful year at SANFL level. He did so, umpiring his 4th SANFL Grand Final in 2011, alongside Colin Rowston (2nd) and Haussen (2nd). At the start of 2012, Fila was offered a senior spot on the AFL list, and had a successful return season, umpiring 20 matches.

At the beginning of February 2014, Gary Fila was appointed as the new AFL Queensland State Umpire Manager.

Beginning November 2015, Gary was appointed as an AFL Assistant Coach at AFL Headquarters in Melbourne.
