= Simon Buckley =

Australian rules footballer

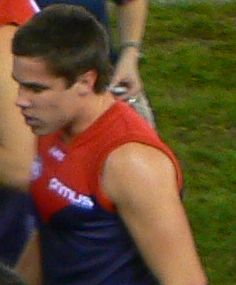
- Buckley in July 2007

Personal information
- Full name: Simon Buckley
- Born: 18 April 1987 (age 39)
- Original team: Sandringham Dragons (TAC Cup)
- Draft: No. 53, 2005 National Draft, Melbourne; No. 85, 2009 National Draft, Collingwood
- Height: 190 cm (6 ft 3 in)
- Weight: 93 kg (205 lb)
- Position: Defender

Playing career^{1}
Years	Club	Games (Goals)
2006–2009	Melbourne	21 (3)
2010–2012	Collingwood	26 (7)
Total		47 (10)
- ^{1} Playing statistics correct to the end of 2012.

Simon Buckley (born 18 April 1987) is a retired Australian rules footballer who played in the Australian Football League (AFL). He played for Melbourne Football Club from 2006 to 2009. He was drafted to Collingwood with 85th pick in 2009 AFL draft but was delisted in 2012.

== Career ==
Taken at pick 53 in the 2005 AFL draft, Buckley was recruited from the Sandringham Dragons TAC Cup club.

The 190 cm, 90 kg midfielder debuted in Round 14 (8 July) of the 2007 AFL season against Carlton Football Club and kicked his first league goal in Round 16.

Buckley improved in the 2008 season, particularly in the second half, averaging 21 disposals and six marks. He also gained a career high 32 disposals in Round 21 of that season.

At the end of the 2009 season, after only playing one game for the season, Buckley was delisted from the Demons.

On 26 November 2009, Buckley was picked up in the AFL Draft at pick number 85 by the Collingwood Magpies.

In May 2010, Buckley admitted to keying his ex-girlfriend's car, a black BMW, and is currently facing charges. His ex-girlfriend, Jade Carter, has also alleged that Buckley physically assaulted her. Buckley has agreed to pay for the damage caused to the car. In 2012 Buckley was delisted by the Magpies. After being delisted by the Magpies, Bucking joined Echuca in the GVFL until retiring prior to the 2019 season. Buckley has since joined Ormond in the VAFA from the 2019 season.(subscription required)
