= Alan Johnson (Australian footballer) =

Australian rules footballer

Personal information
- Born: 20 November 1956 (age 69); East Fremantle, Western Australia
- Original team: Perth (WAFL)
- Draft: No. 1, 1981 interstate draft
- Height: 179 cm (5 ft 10 in)
- Weight: 75 kg (165 lb)
- Position: Midfielder

Playing career
Years	Club	Games (Goals)
1975–1981	Perth	140 (146)
1982–1990	Melbourne	135 (95)
Total		275 (241)

Career highlights
- 2× WAFL premiership player: 1976, 1977; 1× Butcher Medallist: 1981; 2× Keith 'Bluey' Truscott Medallist: 1983, 1989; Melbourne Hall of Fame

Alan Anthony Johnson (born 20 November 1956) is a former Australian rules footballer who played for Perth in the West Australian Football League (WAFL) and Melbourne in the Victorian Football League (VFL). He played five state of origin games for Western Australia.

Johnson was born in Woodside Hospital in East Fremantle, Western Australia and grew up in Palmyra. He attended Aquinas College, Perth. He made his debut for Perth in the 1975 WANFL season kicking three goals on debut. He played in the club's premiership victories in 1976 and 1977 as well as the grand final loss in 1978. In 1981, his final season at the club, he finished as the leading goalkicker and won the club best and fairest. In total he played 140 games for Perth kicking 146 goals.

A wingman recruited from Perth, Western Australia, Johnson twice won the Keith 'Bluey' Truscott Medal for Melbourne's best and fairest player, in 1983 and 1989. In 1989 he was also named in the VFL Team of the Year. Renowned for his courage and his long distance kicking, Johnson moved to a back pocket in his latter years. He played in Melbourne's 1988 VFL Grand Final. Melbourne recruited Johnson's son Chris A. Johnson under the AFL's father–son rule. Chris later moved to Carlton Football Club citing a lack of opportunities.

Johnson was inducted into the West Australian Football Hall of Fame in 2017.

== Statistics ==
Legend
G	Goals	K	Kicks	D	Disposals	T	Tackles
B	Behinds	H	Handballs	M	Marks

Season	Team	No.	Games	Totals							Averages (per game)							Votes
Season	Team	No.	Games	G	B	K	H	D	M	T	G	B	K	H	D	M	T	Votes
1982	Melbourne	9	17	20	29	269	95	364	54	—N/a	1.2	1.7	15.8	5.6	21.4	3.2	—N/a	8
1983	Melbourne	9	18	11	19	319	93	412	81	—N/a	0.6	1.1	17.7	5.2	22.9	4.5	—N/a	6
1984	Melbourne	9	16	16	26	221	87	308	49	—N/a	1.0	1.6	13.8	5.4	19.3	3.1	—N/a	6
1985	Melbourne	9	13	10	15	191	51	242	44	—N/a	0.8	1.2	14.7	3.9	18.6	3.4	—N/a	2
1986	Melbourne	9	10	9	17	132	38	170	29	—N/a	0.9	1.7	13.2	3.8	17.0	2.9	—N/a	7
1987	Melbourne	9	9	6	13	114	29	143	26	20	0.7	1.4	12.7	3.2	15.9	2.9	2.2	2
1988	Melbourne	9	25	13	11	398	81	479	120	26	0.5	0.4	15.9	3.2	19.2	4.8	1.0	5
1989	Melbourne	9	20	4	11	314	47	361	77	23	0.2	0.6	15.7	2.4	18.1	3.9	1.2	6
1990	Melbourne	9	7	6	5	97	19	116	28	7	0.9	0.7	13.9	2.7	16.6	4.0	1.0	3
Career			135	95	146	2055	540	2595	508	76	0.7	1.1	15.2	4.0	19.2	3.8	1.2	45
