= Isaac Weetra =

Australian rules footballer

Personal information
- Full name: Isaac Weetra
- Born: 27 February 1989 (age 37); Whyalla
- Original team: Port Adelaide Magpies
- Height: 184 cm (6 ft 0 in)
- Weight: 76 kg (168 lb)

Playing career^{1}
Years	Club	Games (Goals)
2007–2008	Melbourne	2 (0)
- ^{1} Playing statistics correct to the end of 2008.

Career highlights
- Under 18 Indigenous Australia tour to South Africa; Naish Travers Medallist 2005

Isaac Weetra (born 27 February 1989) is a former professional Australian rules footballer.

He is notable for his brief Australian Football League (AFL) stint, playing with the Melbourne Demons.

== Early life ==
In 2006 he represented Australia's indigenous youth on tour to South Africa with the "Flying Boomerangs" to play against the South African Buffaloes.

Weetra was recruited from Port Adelaide Magpies in the South Australian National Football League (SANFL) with selection number 62 in the 2006 AFL draft after previously playing for West Whyalla in the Whyalla Football League.

== AFL ==
Weetra debuted in the AFL in round 1, 2008 against Hawthorn at the Melbourne Cricket Ground. He was dropped after his second game against the Western Bulldogs and played the rest of the season for Melbourne's VFL-affiliate, Sandringham in the Victorian Football League (VFL).

Weetra was delisted by Melbourne at the conclusion of the 2008 season.

== Post AFL ==
Weetra returned to the Port Adelaide Magpies in the SANFL for the start of the 2009 season.
