= Chris Johnson (footballer, born 1986) =

Australian rules footballer

Personal information
- Full name: Chris A. Johnson
- Born: 25 January 1986 (age 40)
- Original team: East Fremantle Sharks
- Height: 188 cm (6 ft 2 in)
- Weight: 87 kg (192 lb)

Playing career^{1}
Years	Club	Games (Goals)
2004–2008	Melbourne	31 (2)
2009–2010	Carlton	15 (2)
Total		46 (4)
- ^{1} Playing statistics correct to the end of 2010.

Career highlights
- Harold Ball Memorial Trophy: 2005

Chris Johnson (born 25 January 1986) is an Australian rules footballer in the Australian Football League (AFL). The son of Melbourne Demons star Alan Johnson, Johnson was recruited by the Demons under the father–son rule. Johnson, a running defender, was recruited from East Fremantle, at with the 36th selection in the 2003 AFL National Draft. He spent his entire first season in the Victorian Football League (VFL) before making his AFL debut in 2005.

Johnson won Melbourne's Best First Year Player in 2005 and also played in the 2005 and 2006 premiership sides of Melbourne's VFL-affiliate, Sandringham.

Johnson was delisted by the Melbourne Football Club on 31 October 2008 after not agreeing to terms on a new contract and continued his career with the Carlton Football Club, having been selected by the club with its first selection (fourth overall) in the 2009 Pre-season draft.

He made his debut for Carlton in Round 1, 2009 against Richmond. He went on to play 10 games that year, limited by injuries. 2010 saw him manage only five games, again affected by injury but he failed to establish himself as a regular for Carlton, despite hopes that his kicking skills out of defence would benefit the side. He was delisted by Carlton at the conclusion of the 2010 season. In 2011, he signed with Greenvale in the EDFL, where he is playing as of 2013.

Johnson was runner up for the Cleo Eligible Bachelor in 2009.
