= Matthew Head =

Australian rules football umpire (born 1975)

Matthew Head (born 2 November 1975) is a former Australian rules football field umpire (Australian rules football) in the Australian Football League (AFL).

Head attended Marcellin College, Bulleen, and started umpiring in the VAFA, progressing through the U/18 TAC Cup, VFL and AFL Reserve Grade Competition and was appointed to the 1999 Reserves Grand Final.

Head umpired 144 AFL games from 2001 to 2008. He made his debut in Round 5, 2001, when Geelong played Port Adelaide at Kardinia Park, and his final match was in Round 22, 2008, when Essendon played St Kilda at Marvel Stadium. Head wore shirt #16 for his entire career and is heritage number 386. He was known as an excellent bouncer of the football but cited a back injury from bouncing as a reason for his retirement.

Head umpired a number of notable games, including an Essendon–West Coast match at Marvel Stadium in Round 3, 2004, where James Hird kicked the winning goal and celebrated by hugging a member of the crowd. Earlier in the week, on The Footy Show, Hird criticised an umpire and volunteered to pay a $20,000 fine.

Head is perhaps best known as the field umpire who was investigated after it was reported by Channel 9 newsreader Tony Jones that he made the comment "now l know what it feels like to have a victory" whilst boarding an aeroplane following a Fremantle–St Kilda match at Subiaco Oval in Round 21, 2005. In the lead-up to the game, St Kilda coach Grant Thomas was fined $20,000 for making disparaging comments about umpires. The game ended controversially with Fremantle winning by kicking a goal after the siren; this followed a number of earlier umpiring decisions that resulted in goals to Fremantle. Head was later cleared of any wrongdoing. In 2020, Head broke his silence and recalled the infamous night in an interview with Tony Jones as an SEN exclusive. The incident is considered one of the most controversial in the history of AFL umpiring.
