= Brock McLean =

Australian rules footballer (born 1986)

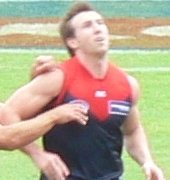
- McLean playing for Melbourne in 2006

Personal information
- Full name: Brock McLean
- Nickname: Chooka
- Born: 11 March 1986 (age 40)
- Original team: Calder Cannons (TAC Cup)
- Draft: No. 5, 2003 National draft, Melbourne
- Height: 185 cm (6 ft 1 in)
- Weight: 84 kg (185 lb)
- Position: Midfielder

Playing career^{1}
Years	Club	Games (Goals)
2004–2009	Melbourne	94 (39)
2010–2014	Carlton	63 (37)
Total		157 (76)
- ^{1} Playing statistics correct to the end of 2014.

Brock "Chooka" McLean (born 11 March 1986) is an Australian rules footballer who played with the Melbourne Football Club and the Carlton Football Club in the Australian Football League (AFL).

== Early life ==
McLean played his underage football with Aberfeldie in the Essendon District Football League and Calder Cannons in the TAC Cup.

He was a graduate of the AIS/AFL academy, and member of the U18 International rules football team in 2003.

McLean was recruited by the Melbourne Football Club, selected in the 2003 AFL National Draft with the club's first round selection (#5 overall) and Melbourne's second selection overall, owing to a pick in the priority round.

== AFL career ==
=== Melbourne ===
McLean debuted for Melbourne in 2004, showing instant maturity and decision making ability quickly. He also became one of the most consistent midfielders in the side. A supergoal in the NAB Cup signalled McLean would be a force in the AFL, finishing the season with nine games.

In his second year, McLean finished fourth in the 2005 AFL Rising Star. He finished with 20 games for the year and polled an impressive nine Brownlow Medal votes in just his second year of football.

McLean's 2006 season was interrupted by leg and hamstring injuries, but when playing he had immediate impact and was sorely missed when not available for selection.

McLean started the 2007 season in the worst possible way, sustaining a serious foot injury in round one, playing against St Kilda. The injury kept him out of the majority of the first half of the season. In this period, Melbourne proceeded to lose its first nine games. Once returning to the field, McLean again managed to gather numerous possessions.

McLean injured ligaments in his ankle in a tackle during Melbourne's Round 14 match against Brisbane in 2008. Although McLean returned to the field later in the match, it was later declared that he would require surgery, ending his season. Although McLean finished the season with only 14 games, he ran a close second in Melbourne's best and fairest.

=== Carlton ===
At the end of the 2009 season, McLean was traded to the Carlton Football Club in exchange for its first round selection (No. 11 overall) in the 2009 National draft. McLean had requested to be traded, and he revealed in an interview in 2012 that his primary reason was that he did not enjoy what he saw as a losing culture at Melbourne – particularly towards the end of the 2009 season, a time when Melbourne was perceived by football journalists to have tanked in order to secure a priority draft pick.

McLean made his debut for Carlton in the first round of 2010, but niggling injuries and knee surgery restricted McLean's playing time for the rest of 2010. He was healthy throughout 2011, but played the majority of the season for Carlton's VFL-affiliate, the Northern Bullants. He played a total of nineteen games for the Bullants through the season, and won the Laurie Hill Trophy as best and fairest. Despite this good form at VFL level, he could not gain regular selection for Carlton, playing only four AFL matches for the year.

After playing only eleven games in his first two and a half years at Carlton, McLean gained regular selection at Carlton after Round 9, 2012, and played every match for the rest of the season, ultimately finishing fourth in the best and fairest.

McLean was delisted at the conclusion of the 2014 AFL season. He returned to play senior football at his junior club Aberfeldie from 2015.

== Statistics ==
Statistics are correct to the end of the 2014 season

Legend
G	Goals	K	Kicks	D	Disposals	T	Tackles
B	Behinds	H	Handballs	M	Marks

Season	Team	No.	Games	Totals							Averages (per game)						
Season	Team	No.	Games	G	B	K	H	D	M	T	G	B	K	H	D	M	T
2004	Melbourne	5	9	5	4	54	25	79	12	22	0.6	0.4	6.0	2.8	8.8	1.3	2.4
2005	Melbourne	5	20	6	3	177	117	294	73	63	0.3	0.2	8.9	5.9	14.7	3.7	3.2
2006	Melbourne	5	18	14	4	248	154	402	93	78	0.8	0.2	13.8	8.6	22.3	5.2	4.3
2007	Melbourne	5	14	4	3	157	97	254	45	60	0.3	0.2	11.2	6.9	18.1	3.2	4.3
2008	Melbourne	5	14	3	4	177	154	331	58	54	0.2	0.3	12.6	11.0	23.6	4.1	3.9
2009	Melbourne	5	19	7	1	214	197	411	74	81	0.4	0.1	11.3	10.4	21.6	3.9	4.3
2010	Carlton	7	6	2	2	41	66	107	20	31	0.3	0.3	6.8	11.0	17.8	3.3	5.2
2011	Carlton	14	4	1	2	23	39	62	13	23	0.3	0.5	5.8	9.8	15.5	3.3	5.8
2012	Carlton	14	15	10	8	179	209	388	78	78	0.7	0.5	11.9	13.9	25.9	5.2	5.2
2013	Carlton	14	22	15	13	254	210	464	105	77	0.7	0.6	11.5	9.5	21.1	4.8	3.5
2014	Carlton	14	16	9	13	182	125	307	66	49	0.6	0.8	11.4	7.8	19.2	4.1	3.1
Career			157	76	57	1706	1393	3099	637	616	0.5	0.4	10.9	8.9	19.7	4.1	3.9
