= Ben Holland =

Australian rules footballer

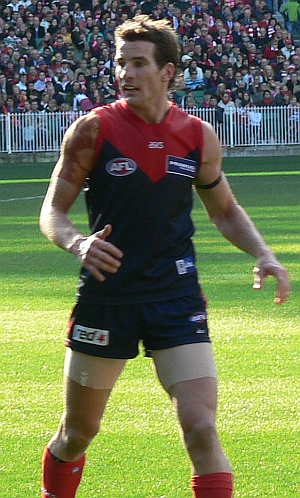
- Ben Holland playing for Melbourne in 2006

Personal information
- Full name: Ben Holland
- Born: 10 May 1977 (age 49)
- Original team: North Adelaide (SANFL)
- Draft: 19
- Height: 198 cm (6 ft 6 in)
- Weight: 100 kg (220 lb)
- Position: Key position

Playing career^{1}
Years	Club	Games (Goals)
1996–2003	Richmond	125 (124)
2004–2008	Melbourne	66 (55)
Total		191 (179)
- ^{1} Playing statistics correct to the end of 2008.

Ben Holland (born 10 May 1977) is a former Australian rules footballer who played in the Australian Football League. Holland made his AFL debut with Richmond in 1996, transferred to Melbourne at the end of the 2003 season and retired in 2008.
