= Nathan Carroll =

Australian rules footballer

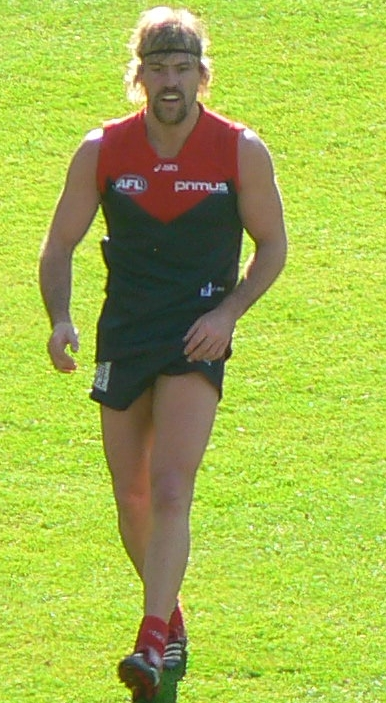
- Carroll playing for Melbourne during 2007

Personal information
- Full name: Nathan John Carroll
- Born: 20 October 1980 (age 46)
- Original team: Claremont (WAFL)
- Debut: Round 4, 19 April 2003, Melbourne vs. Geelong, at Skilled Stadium
- Height: 191 cm (6 ft 3 in)
- Weight: 90 kg (198 lb)

Playing career^{1}
Years	Club	Games (Goals)
2003–2008	Melbourne	71 (1)
- ^{1} Playing statistics correct to the end of 2008.

Nathan John Carroll (born 20 October 1980) is a former Australian rules footballer who played for Melbourne in the Australian Football League (AFL).

Carroll was recruited to the Fremantle Football Club from Claremont in the 2000 Rookie draft and stayed on the rookie list for one season (2000) before being delisted.

A defender, he was selected by Melbourne in the 2003 Rookie Draft and he made his AFL debut that season. After playing only eleven games in his first two seasons, 2005 loomed as an important year for Carroll. He made his way into the team late in the season, before an injury in the Round 18 loss to St Kilda sidelined him for two weeks. He was recalled for the last three games of Melbourne's season.

He underwent surgery on his shoulder at the end of the 2005 season.

In 2006, Carroll was a much improved player and played all 24 games in easily his best season to date. In the elimination final, he managed to keep Fraser Gehrig goalless after Gehrig had kicked three goals in the first quarter.

Nathan Carroll was delisted by Melbourne at the end of the 2008 season.

His older brother, Trent Carroll, was on the senior lists at Fremantle and West Coast for several seasons.

In 2010, while working and living in Melbourne, and working in Western Australia, Carroll has joined the St Kilda City Football Club in the Southern Football League.
