= Matthew Whelan =

Australian rules footballer

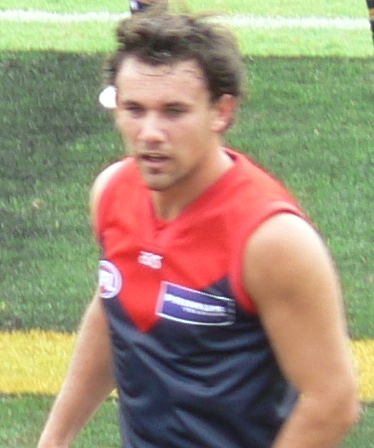

Personal information
- Born: 13 November 1979 (age 46); Darwin
- Original teams: Darwin Buffaloes (NT), Woodville-West Torrens (SA)
- Debut: Round 4, 2 April 2000, Melbourne Demons vs. St Kilda Saints, at Melbourne Cricket Ground
- Height: 180 cm (5 ft 11 in)
- Weight: 80 kg (176 lb)

Playing career^{1}
Years	Club	Games (Goals)
2000–2009	Melbourne	150 (15)
- ^{1} Playing statistics correct to the end of 2009.

Career highlights
- Harold Ball Memorial Trophy: 2000

Matthew Whelan (born 13 November 1979) is a former professional Australian rules football player.

Wearing the number 45 jersey, Whelan, recruited from the Northern Territory was a defender/back pocket known by Demons fans as "Wheels". He also earned the nickname "Wrecker" (after Whelan the Wrecker) for his big hits (often on big name players) and tough and uncompromisingly defensive style of play. His tackling style, to drop the shoulder, resulted in spectacular, almost spear tackle like throws of opponents, and he ended up at the Tribunal many years over unsightly plays.

== Early life ==
Matthew has Indigenous Australian heritage, and his ancestry can be traced to the Ngalakan language speaking peoples of the Arnhem Land. He grew up in Darwin, the capital of the Northern Territory, where he played rugby league at junior levels before concentrating on Australian football at the age of 15. Before heading to Victoria in 2000, Whelan played in both the Northern Territory and South Australian leagues. From October to March he would play for Darwin before heading to Woodville-West Torrens for the winter.

== AFL career ==
=== 2000 debut season ===
Whelan made his debut in round four of season 2000, and played every game until round 20 when an injured neck cost him his place and he missed the finals, including Melbourne's grand final appearance. This was a major blow to the Demons, who missed his toughness against a more physical Essendon.

=== History repeats ===
History repeated itself in 2002 when Whelan played every game but was forced out in round 22 with a calf injury, and another finals series went begging.

=== 2003 & Shane Crawford incident ===
In a rare report for rough play in 2003 for what appeared to be a dangerous throw on Shane Crawford he was later cleared by the tribunal of any infringement.

=== 2004 & James Hird incident ===
During the 2004 Elimination Final, Melbourne were drawn to play rivals Essendon. With about five minutes to go in the first half, Whelan knocked James Hird unconscious with a strong shirtfront, re-gathered the ball and fed it off to Travis Johnstone who finished the play with a goal to bring up double figures for the Demons. Whelan, playing his first final, was one of Melbourne's best, picking up 22 possessions and a match high five tackles.

=== 2005 & Nathan Brown incident ===
During the final quarter of the Melbourne v Richmond game on 27 May 2005, Richmond attacked in their 50 when Whelan came from nowhere to smother Nathan Brown's kick. Because Brown was kicking with his left boot, Whelan landed on his right foot, and, in front of horrified Friday Night Football viewers, broke his leg. Replays were constantly played on the news, including Sports Tonight and Fox Sports News. Whelan said that he had felt guilty, given the seriousness of Brown's injury. Brown sat out the rest of the season, and has had re-occurring leg-related injuries ever since.

=== 2006 AFL Season ===
Whelan had a stellar season in 2006, marred only by minor injuries to his calf and hamstring.he kicked a career high four goals in round-five

=== 2007 & Luke Ball incident ===
During the 2007 season opener against St Kilda, while shepherding a teammate, Whelan turned his back, colliding solidly with Luke Ball. The severe collision injured both players, resulting in both coming off the ground, with the back of Whelan's head lacerating Ball's forehead. Ball was carried off the ground with a laceration to his head, although both players later returned to play out the game. Whelan was charged for rough play based on the video. The charge, however, was later dropped as the high contact was ruled as an accidental clash of heads, while Ball continued a slow recovery from the injury.

His 2007 season saw him play just a handful of games due to injury.

=== 2008 & Brendan Fevola incident ===
In round-five of the 2008 season, Whelan was reported for striking Carlton's full-forward Brendan Fevola. He was offered a two-week suspension by the AFL. But an early guilty plea reduced this to just one week.

== Retirement ==
In August 2009, Whelan announced his retirement from the AFL alongside teammate Paul Wheatley, effective after Round 22, as part of the Melbourne Football Club's youth policy. His career has been plagued by injury, but is leaving on a good note and was happy to play an important role mentoring the MFC's young Aboriginal players. In February 2010, Whelan was awarded life membership of the Melbourne Football club at the club's annual general meeting.
