= 2010 Melbourne Football Club season =

Melbourne Football Club
2010 season
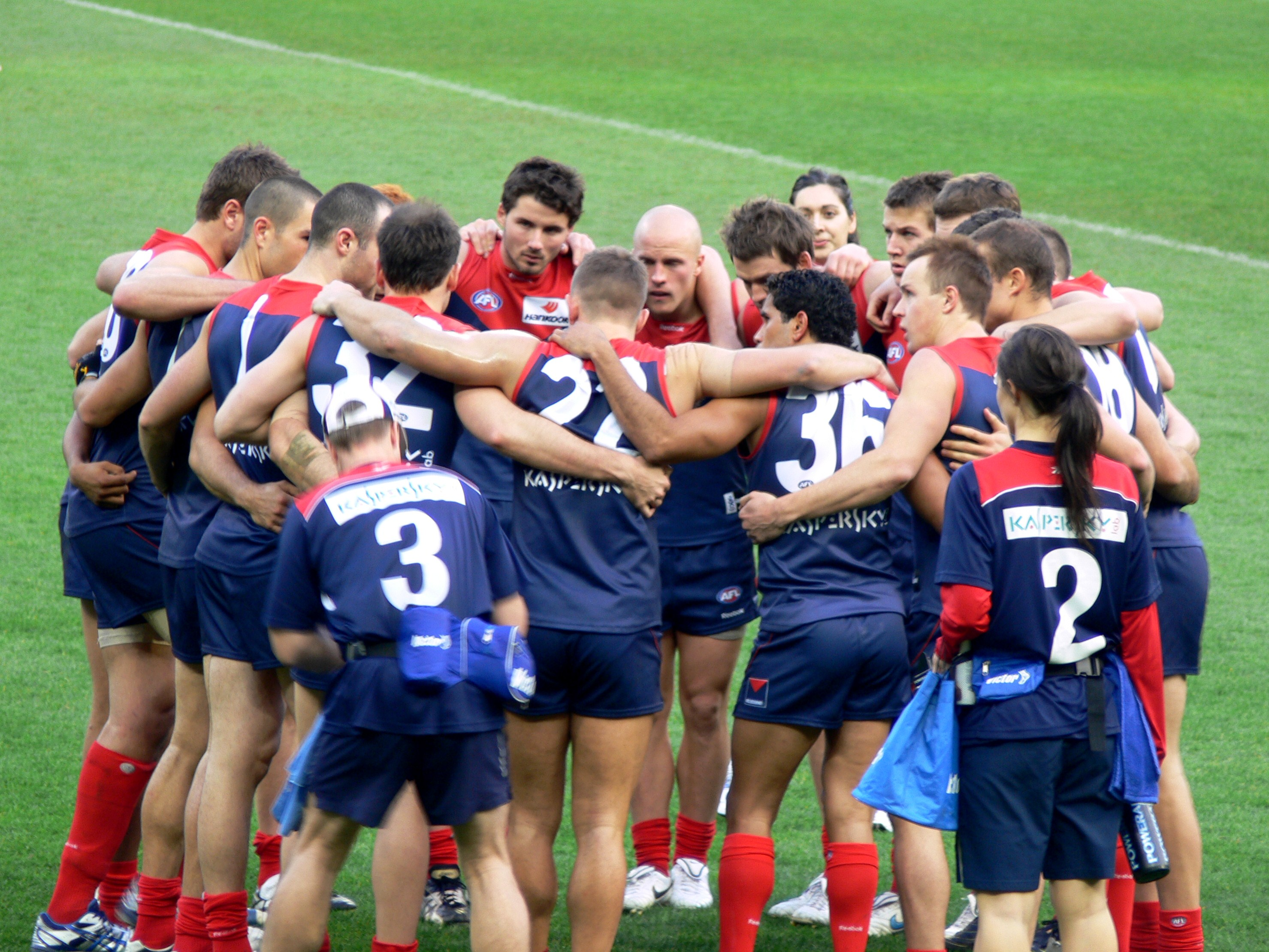
- Melbourne huddle against Collingwood in round 12
- President: Jim Stynes^{(3rd season)}
- Coach: Dean Bailey^{(3rd season)}
- Captains: James McDonald^{(3rd season)}
- Home grounds: MCG^{(100,018 capacity)}
- Pre-season: First round
- AFL season: 12th
- Finals series: DNQ
- Best and fairest: Brad Green
- Leading goalkicker: Brad Green^{(55 goals)}
- Highest home attendance: 67,454^{(round 12 vs. Collingwood)}
- Lowest home attendance: 8,848^{(round 9 vs. Port Adelaide)}
- Average home attendance: 37,739
- Club membership: 33,358^{(▲1,852 / ▲5.88%)}

The 2010 Melbourne Football Club season was the club's 111th year in the VFL/AFL since it began in 1897.

Melbourne played 14 games at the MCG, 10 of which were home games. They also played a home match at TIO Stadium in Darwin against Port Adelaide in Round 9. It was Dean Bailey's third year as senior coach. James McDonald continued as the club's captain until retiring at the end of the year.

After a terrible start to the season getting thrashed to Hawthorn by 56 points, Melbourne began to lift their work-rate in games and indicate that they were beginning to successfully maneuver Dean Bailey's coaching-style. They began to play a fast and exciting brand of football with heavy use of the corridor and playing-on in subsequent weeks. Furthermore, unlike the 3 previous seasons, Melbourne began to cut heavy defects back to smaller deficits by preventing their opponents from scoring. This was due to Melbourne constantly gained running momentum when moving the ball outside of their defensive 50.

Melbourne's season was headlined by being constantly competitive on a weekly basis only losing one more time for the season by over 50 points to Geelong in Round 10. Melbourne was shown strong signs of competitiveness against the sides that eventually finished in the top 8 that year. This included a 4-point loss to the Western Bulldogs in Round 7, an 11-point loss to Fremantle at Subiaco in Round 16, a 1-point loss & a draw to the eventual premiers that year Collingwood in Rounds 2 & 12 respectively and a 73-point win to Sydney in Round 17.

In addition to Melbourne's promising season allowing them to achieve 8 wins and a draw with a percentage of 94.52%, it also allowed James Frawley and Mark Jamar to earn position in the 2010 All-Australian team in the back line and the interchange bench respectively.

In August, Melbourne announced it was officially debt free. The same night Melbourne also unveiled its new logo.

== 2010 list changes ==
=== 2009 trades ===
Trade gained	Traded from	Trade lost	Ref
Pick 11	Carlton	Brock McLean	

=== Retirements and delistings ===
Player	New club	League	Reason	Ref
Matthew Whelan	Pines Football Club	MPNFL	Retired	
Paul Wheatley	Palmerston Football Club	NTFL	Retired	
Russell Robertson	Shepparton Swans	Goulburn Valley Football League	Retired	
Simon Buckley	Collingwood	AFL	Delisted	
Shane Valenti	Port Melbourne	VFL	Delisted	
Trent Zomer	Unknown	Unknown	Delisted	

=== National draft ===
Round	Overall pick	Player	State	Position	Team from	League from
1	1	Tom Scully	(Victoria (state))	Midfield	Dandenong Stingrays	TAC Cup
1	2	Jack Trengove	(South Australia)	Midfield	Sturt	SANFL
1	11	Jordan Gysberts	(Victoria (state))	Midfield	Eastern Ranges	TAC Cup
2	18	Luke Tapscott	(South Australia)	Forward/Midfield	North Adelaide	SANFL
3	34	Max Gawn	(Victoria (state))	Ruck	Sandringham Dragons	TAC Cup
4	50	Jack Fitzpatrick	(Victoria (state))	Key Position	Western Jets	TAC Cup

=== Pre-season draft ===
Round	Overall pick	Player	State	Position	Team from	League from
1	1	Joel Macdonald	(Queensland)	Defender	Brisbane Lions	AFL

=== Rookie draft ===
Round	Overall pick	Player	State	Position	Team from	League from
1	6	Michael Newton	(Victoria (state))	Forward	Melbourne	AFL
2	22	John Meesen	(Victoria (state))	Ruck	Melbourne	AFL

== 2010 squad ==
Melbourne Football Club
Senior list		Rookie List	Coaching staff
1 Matthew Warnock; 2 Nathan Jones; 3 Clint Bartram; 4 Jack Watts; 5 Jordan Gysberts; 6 Matthew Bate; 7 Brad Miller; 8 James Frawley; 9 Jack Trengove; 10 Cale Morton; 11 Paul Johnson; 12 Colin Sylvia; 14 Lynden Dunn; 15 Ricky Petterd; 16 Jack Grimes; 18 Brad Green; 19 Addam Maric; 20 Colin Garland; 21 Daniel Bell; 22 Brent Moloney	23 James McDonald (c); 24 Liam Jurrah; 25 Kyle Cheney; 27 Jared Rivers; 28 Joel Macdonald; 30 Tom McNamara; 31 Tom Scully; 32 Cameron Bruce; 33 Austin Wonaeamirri; 34 Stefan Martin; 35 Luke Tapscott; 36 Aaron Davey; 37 Max Gawn; 39 Neville Jetta; 40 Mark Jamar; 43 Jamie Bennell; 44 Rohan Bail; 46 Sam Blease; 47 James Strauss; 48 Jack Fitzpatrick	13 Jordie McKenzie; 26 John Meesen; 29 Michael Newton; 38 Daniel Hughes; 42 Jake Spencer; 50 Rhys Healey	Head coach: Dean Bailey; Assistant coaches: Josh Mahoney (forward coach); Scott West (midfield coach); Sean Wellman (defensive coach); Mark Williams (development coach); Legend: (c) Captain(s); (vc) Vice-captain(s)

== 2010 season ==
=== Pre-season ===
==== NAB Cup ====
===== Week 1 =====
Round 1
Sunday, 21 February (5:40 pm)	Fremantle	def.	Melbourne	Subiaco (crowd: 11,031)
0.4.4 (28); 1.6.6 (53); 1.10.9 (78); 1.13.10 (97)	Q1; Q2; Q3; Final	0.0.2 (2); 2.1.3 (27); 2.2.5 (35); 2.4.8 (50)	Umpires: Margetts, Dalgleish, McInerney, Keating; Television broadcast: Foxtel
Pearce	Super Goals	Green, Davey
Johnson 3, Pavlich 3, Ballantyne 2, Headland 2, Mayne, Pearce, Sandilands	Goals	Miller 2, Morton, Petterd
Mundy, Barlow, Hayden, Duffield, Grover, Pearce	Best	Macdonald, Jones, Rivers, Frawley, Grimes
McPhee (ankle), Bradley (hip), Schammer (ankle)	Injuries	Spencer (cork)

==== NAB Challenge ====
===== Week 2 =====
Week 2
Saturday, 27 February (4:00 pm)	Melbourne	def. by	Essendon	Visy Park (crowd: 3000 est)
2.6 (18); 3.9 (27); 8.11 (59); 11.14 (80)	Q1; Q2; Q3; Final	6.1 (37); 8.5 (53); 12.8 (80); 18.12 (120)	Umpires: Findlay, Dalgleish, Keating, Wenn; Television broadcast: none
Petterd 4, Grimes 2, Jones, Jurrah, Bell, Martin, Maric	Goals	Ryder 3, Davey 2, Stanton 2, Lonergan 2, Watson 2, Monfries, Hille, Williams, McVeigh, Welsh, Winderlich, Hocking
Grimes, Trengove, Petterd, Sylvia, Miller	Best	Dempsey, Watson, Ryder, Stanton, Davey, Fletcher
Morton (knee)	Injuries

===== Week 3 =====
Week 3
Sunday, 7 March (2:10 pm)	Adelaide	def.	Melbourne	Elizabeth Oval (crowd: 5000 est)
3.2 (20); 3.7 (25); 7.12 (54); 9.15 (69)	Q1; Q2; Q3; Final	3.0 (18); 7.2 (44); 8.3 (51); 10.7 (67)	Umpires: Vosso, Armstrong, Keating, Margetts; Television broadcast: none
Tippett 5, Cook, Petrenko, Thompson, Gunston	Goals	Petterd 4, Miller 2, Maric 2, Jurrah, Scully
Edwards, Mackay, Dangerfield, Tippett, Cook, Goodwin, Rutten, Petrenko	Best	Scully, Petterd, Gysberts, Trengove, McDonald, Maric
McLeod (back spasms)	Injuries	Jurrah (shoulder), Bell (ACL), Newton (shoulder)
Record: 0 Wins, 2 Losses, 0 Draws

===== Week 4 =====
Week 4
Saturday, 13 March (2:10 pm)	Melbourne	def. by	West Coast	Casey Fields (crowd: 5000 est)
4.6 (30); 7.9 (51); 9.10 (64); 12.14 (86)	Q1; Q2; Q3; Final	5.2 (32); 9.5 (59); 12.13 (85); 18.16 (124)	Umpires: Vosso, Armstrong, Ryan, Nicholls; Television broadcast: none
Miller 3, Bruce 2, Jones 2, Bate 2, Jamar, Green, Petterd	Goals	Hansen 3, LeCras 3, Brown 2, Naitanui 2, Embley 2, Cox, Nicoski, Kennedy, Selwood, Stevens, Priddis
Bruce, Miller, McDonald, Green, Jones	Best	Selwood, Butler, LeCras, Hansen, Brown, Embley
Record: 0 Wins, 3 Losses, 0 Draws

=== Home and away season ===
==== Round 1 ====
Round 1
Saturday, 27 March (2:10 pm)	Melbourne	def. by	Hawthorn	MCG (crowd: 44,615)
0.3 (3); 1.6 (12); 4.9 (33); 8.13 (61)	Q1; Q2; Q3; Final	6.3 (39); 10.8 (68); 15.14 (104); 17.15 (117)	Umpires: McLaren, Stewart, Kamolins; Television broadcast: Foxtel
Green 2, Miller 2, Petterd 2, McKenzie, Jamar	Goals	Brown 3, Roughead 3, Moss 2, Osborne 2, Hooper 2, Peterson, Morton, Hodge, Ladson, Mitchell
Jamar, McDonald, Frawley, McKenzie, Moloney	Best	Hodge, Brown, Lewis, Mitchell, Gibson, Ellis, Ladson, Murphy
Green (concussion)	Injuries
After a disastrous pre-season with no wins, Dean Bailey's role as senior-coach was put immediately under scrutiny when Melbourne were unable to stop the hard tackling midfield offence from Hawthorn (whom were missing several key players). They managed to score only one goal in the first half to Hawthorn's ten.; Late in the third quarter when Hawthorn had a 78-point lead (102–24), they relaxed and allowed Melbourne to move the ball more freely. Eventually Melbourne earned some respectability back on the score board by kicking the last 5 out of 7 goals for the match.; Debut(s): Tom Scully, James Strauss, Jack Trengove; Debut(s) for MFC: Joel Macdonald; Brownlow Votes: Luke Hodge (Hawthorn) 3 votes, Jordan Lewis (Hawthorn) 2 votes, Sam Mitchell (Hawthorn) 1 vote Record: 0 Wins, 1 Loss, 0 Draws (52.13%); Ladder Position: 16th

==== Round 2 ====
Round 2
Saturday, 3 April (2:10 pm)	Collingwood	def.	Melbourne	MCG (crowd: 50,421)
2.2 (14); 7.5 (47); 10.10 (70); 12.14 (86)	Q1; Q2; Q3; Final	4.5 (29); 6.6 (42); 9.11 (65); 12.13 (85)	Umpires: Wenn, Jeffery, Hay; Television broadcast: Foxtel
Anthony 2, Davis 2, Pendlebury 2, Lockyer 2, Beams, Fraser, Medhurst, Cloke	Goals	Petterd 4, Green 3, Dunn 2, Bennell, Newton, Bail
Beams, Pendlebury, Thomas, Sidebottom, O'Brien, Wellingham	Best	Petterd, Davey, Grimes, Jamar, McDonald, Moloney
Johnson (knee), O'Bree (virus) replaced in selected side by Beams	Injuries	Spencer replaced in selected side by Bartram
After a week of scrutiny for their round 1 performance, Melbourne stunned premiership-contenders Collingwood with rapid ball movement down the corridor and frequent tackling to head into quarter time 2 goals ahead.; Collingwood wrestled their way back into the game and eventually the lead. However Aaron Davey's movement through the midfield; Jack Grimes' hardness in the back-line; Ricky Petterd's present-ability in the forward line and Mark Jamar's domination in the ruck prevented Collingwood from running away with the match.; After many lead changes throughout the game and with Collingwood in front by a point in the dying seconds of the game, Rohan Bail would gather uncontested possession of the ball on Melbourne's attacking 50. He would kick the ball to the goal-square where Ricky Petterd was present to mark the ball and kick after the siren. However a desperate rush from Steele Sidebottom prevented Petterd from marking the ball with safe hands as the ball spilled to the ground on the siren.; Milestone(s): Brad Green (200th AFL game), Rohan Bail (1st AFL goal); Brownlow Votes: Aaron Davey (Melbourne) 3 votes, Alan Didak (Collingwood) 2 votes, Ricky Petterd (Melbourne) 1 vote Record: 0 Wins, 2 Loss, 0 Draws (71.92%); Ladder Position: 12th

==== Round 3 ====
Round 3
Sunday, 11 April (1:10 pm)	Melbourne	def.	Adelaide	MCG (crowd: 23,335)
1.5 (11); 1.8 (14); 5.11 (41); 7.15 (57)	Q1; Q2; Q3; Final	2.5 (17); 4.9 (33); 5.10 (40); 5.11 (41)	Umpires: McBurney, Ryan, Armstrong; Television broadcast: Foxtel
Bate 2, Bennell, Green, Jones, McDonald, Trengove	Goals	Burton 2, Cook, Maric
Grimes, McDonald, Green, Trengove, Jamar, Frawley	Best	Vince, Goodwin, Mackay, Burton, Doughty, Thompson
In unusually cold April weather, an under-performing and winless Adelaide attempted to gain their first victory for the season against a much improved Melbourne side from the week before.; Melbourne appeared to have fallen back to their hapless style of play from Round 1 as Adelaide restricted them to a single first half goal and opened up a 25 point lead early in the third quarter. However Melbourne eventually re-found their spark they showed against Collingwood and conceded only 2 more behinds for the entire game.; Melbourne would pile on the final 6 goals of the game in a scrappy affair causing a 38 point turnaround and their first victory for the season.; Milestone(s): Jack Trengove (1st AFL goal); Brownlow Votes: Jack Grimes (Melbourne) 3 votes, Bernie Vince (Adelaide) 2 votes, James McDonald (Melbourne) 1 vote Record: 1 Wins, 2 Losses, 0 Draws (83.20%); Ladder Position: 11th

==== Round 4 ====
Round 4
Sunday, 18 April (1:10 pm)	Richmond	def. by	Melbourne	MCG (crowd: 42,594)
5.2 (32); 7.7 (49); 7.9 (51); 11.12 (78)	Q1; Q2; Q3; Final	8.1 (49); 8.7 (55); 15.11 (101); 20.13 (133)	Umpires: Kennedy, McLaren, Grun; Television broadcast: Foxtel
Riewoldt 3, Astbury 3, Tambling, Morton, Tuck, Nason, Taylor	Goals	Sylvia 5, Green 4, Bate 3, Petterd 2, Bail 2, McDonald, Jamar, Dunn, Bartram
Moore, Tuck, Riewoldt, Deledio, Cotchin	Best	Moloney, McDonald, Sylvia, Green, Scully, Jones, Davey, Bruce
Melbourne headed into a game for the first time as clear favorites since Round 20, 2006.; In a high scoring first quarter, Richmond kicked the first 2 majors of the game before Melbourne retaliated with the next 8 out of 11.; By the turn of the second quarter, the game's tempo had slowed dramatically. Melbourne were held goal less and Richmond cut the deficit back to a single goal at half time.; Midfield veterans Colin Sylvia, Brent Moloney and James McDonald broke the game clear against the 2 young sides in the third quarter. They allowed Melbourne to pile on 7 unanswered goals and give them a 50 point lead at three quarter time.; By the final quarter, Richmond managed to break the strangle hold Melbourne applied to them in the third quarter. However the damage was already done by Melbourne's senior players as they ran out 56 point winners.; Brownlow Votes: Brad Green (Melbourne) 3 votes, James McDonald (Melbourne) 2 votes, Brent Moloney (Melbourne) 1 vote Record: 2 Wins, 2 Losses, 0 Draws (104.35%); Ladder Position: 9th

==== Round 5 ====
Round 5
24 April (7:10 pm)	Melbourne	def.	Brisbane Lions	MCG (crowd: 36,396)
4.2 (26); 9.6 (60); 12.7 (79); 15.13 (103)	Q1; Q2; Q3; Final	2.3 (15); 3.6 (24); 7.9 (51); 7.11 (53)	Umpires: Hayden Kennedy, Stuart Wenn, Michael Jennings; Television broadcast: Foxtel
Sylvia 2, Trengove 2, Petterd 2, Davey 2, Jamar, Green, McKenzie, Jones, Bate, McDonald, Scully	Goals	Fevola 4, Brown, Clark, Drummond
Trengove, Jones, Green, Petterd, Davey, Sylvia, Jamar, McDonald	Best	Black, Johnstone, Fevola, Rischitelli, Drummond, Rich
Melbourne entered the game as underdogs against an undefeated Brisbane Lions side.; Melbourne immediately got Brisbane on the back-foot with their signature brand of fast-transitioning football through the corridor they had played in the previous 3 weeks. Throughout the first half, Melbourne were too fast for Brisbane and hence they gained a 36 point lead heading into half time.; Brisbane restored some credibility for their previous week's performances by winning the third quarter. However Melbourne's combination of agility around contests, hard running, hard tackling and rapid ball movement held Brisbane scoreless in the final quarter and Melbourne 50 point winners.; Melbourne won their third consecutive match for the first time since Round 12, 2006 and their first 50+ point win against Brisbane since Round 10, 2000.; Milestone(s): Tom Scully (1st AFL goal); Brownlow Votes: Brad Green (Melbourne) 3 votes, James McDonald (Melbourne) 2 votes, Brent Moloney (Melbourne) 1 vote Record: 3 Wins, 2 Losses, 0 Draws (117.07%); Ladder Position: 9th

==== Round 6 ====
Round 6
1 May (2:10 pm)	North Melbourne	def.	Melbourne	Etihad Stadium (crowd: 26,763)
3.3 (21); 8.7 (55); 10.12 (72); 15.14 (104)	Q1; Q2; Q3; Final	2.1 (13); 3.3 (21); 9.4 (58); 12.6 (78)	Television broadcast: Network Ten
Record: 3 Wins, 3 Losses, 0 Draws

==== Round 7 ====
Round 7
7 May (7:40 pm)	Melbourne	def. by	Western Bulldogs	MCG (crowd: 45,444)
0.6 (6); 3.9 (27); 7.10 (52); 9.12 (66)	Q1; Q2; Q3; Final	3.2 (20); 5.5 (35); 8.7 (55); 10.10 (70)	Television broadcast: Seven Network
Record: 3 Wins, 4 Losses, 0 Draws

==== Round 8 ====
Round 8
15 May (2:10 pm)	Melbourne	def. by	West Coast	MCG (crowd: 28,592)
1.3 (9); 5.5 (35); 6.8 (44); 6.10 (46)	Q1; Q2; Q3; Final	3.0 (18); 5.5 (35); 8.8 (56); 10.15 (75)	Television broadcast: Foxtel
Record: 3 Wins, 5 Losses, 0 Draws

==== Round 9 ====
Round 9
22 May (7:10 pm)	Melbourne	def.	Port Adelaide	TIO Stadium (crowd: 8,848)
5.2 (32); 9.6 (60); 14.7 (91); 17.9 (111)	Q1; Q2; Q3; Final	3.3 (21); 7.6 (48); 8.10 (58); 16.14 (110)	Television broadcast: Foxtel
Record: 4 Wins, 5 Losses, 0 Draws

==== Round 10 ====
Round 10
29 May (2:10 pm)	Geelong	def.	Melbourne	Skilled Stadium (crowd: 24,525)
5.5 (35); 9.6 (60); 14.8 (92); 18.13 (121)	Q1; Q2; Q3; Final	2.1 (13); 4.4 (28); 7.6 (48); 10.7 (67)	Television broadcast: Network Ten
Record: 4 Wins, 6 Losses, 0 Draws

==== Round 11 ====
Round 11
5 June (2:10 pm)	Carlton	def.	Melbourne	MCG (crowd: 49,745)
7.4 (46); 9.6 (60); 11.7 (73); 15.11 (101)	Q1; Q2; Q3; Final	2.2 (14); 3.4 (22); 8.6 (54); 9.6 (60)	Television broadcast: Network Ten
Record: 4 Wins, 7 Losses, 0 Draws

==== Round 12 ====
Round 12
14 June (2:10 pm)	Melbourne	drew with	Collingwood	MCG (crowd: 67,454)
3.2 (20); 6.3 (39); 7.8 (50); 11.10 (76)	Q1; Q2; Q3; Final	4.8 (32); 5.10 (40); 6.19 (55); 9.22 (76)	Television broadcast: Network Ten
Record: 4 Wins, 7 Losses, 1 Draw

==== Round 13 ====
Round 13
27 June (2:40 pm)	Adelaide	def.	Melbourne	AAMI Stadium (crowd: 34,422)
4.6 (30); 9.10 (64); 10.19 (79); 16.21 (117)	Q1; Q2; Q3; Final	1.3 (9); 3.5 (23); 8.6 (54); 11.7 (73)	Television broadcast: Foxtel
Record: 4 Wins, 8 Losses, 1 Draw

==== Round 14 ====
Round 14
4 July (4:40 pm)	St Kilda	def.	Melbourne	Etihad Stadium (crowd: 31,993)
3.4 (22); 8.5 (53); 11.7 (73); 15.10 (100)	Q1; Q2; Q3; Final	3.3 (21); 5.7 (37); 8.9 (57); 9.11 (65)	Television broadcast: Foxtel
Record: 4 Wins, 9 Losses, 1 Draw

==== Round 15 ====
Round 15
11 July (2:10 pm)	Melbourne	def.	Essendon	MCG (crowd: 49,203)
6.2 (38); 10.6 (66); 14.7 (91); 19.8 (122)	Q1; Q2; Q3; Final	3.4 (22); 4.10 (34); 8.16 (64); 14.19 (103)	Television broadcast: Seven Network
Record: 5 Wins, 9 Losses, 1 Draw

==== Round 16 ====
Round 16
18 July (2:40 pm)	Fremantle	def.	Melbourne	Subiaco (crowd: 32,816)
6.3 (39); 9.8 (62); 10.10 (70); 11.16 (82)	Q1; Q2; Q3; Final	1.2 (8); 3.5 (23); 9.8 (62); 10.11 (71)	Television broadcast: Foxtel
Record: 5 Wins, 10 Losses, 1 Draw

==== Round 17 ====
Round 17
25 July (2:10 pm)	Melbourne	def.	Sydney	MCG (crowd: 29,374)
8.2 (50); 12.4 (76); 20.8 (128); 22.10 (142)	Q1; Q2; Q3; Final	2.1 (13); 4.4 (28); 6.6 (42); 10.9 (69)	Television broadcast: Seven Network
Record: 6 Wins, 10 Losses, 1 Draw

==== Round 18 ====
Round 18
31 July (7:10 pm)	Brisbane Lions	def. by	Melbourne	Gabba (crowd: 26,144)
2.2 (14); 4.5 (29); 7.6 (48); 9.10 (64)	Q1; Q2; Q3; Final	4.3 (27); 9.5 (59); 10.8 (68); 11.8 (74)	Television broadcast: Foxtel
Record: 7 Wins, 10 Losses, 1 Draw

==== Round 19 ====
Round 19
8 August (2:10 pm)	Melbourne	def.	Richmond	MCG (crowd: 45,844)
3.1 (19); 7.5 (47); 10.10 (70); 16.13 (109)	Q1; Q2; Q3; Final	2.5 (17); 7.6 (48); 9.9 (63); 11.14 (80)	Television broadcast: Seven Network
Record: 8 Wins, 10 Losses, 1 Draw

==== Round 20 ====
Round 20
15 August (2:10 pm)	Hawthorn	def.	Melbourne	MCG (crowd: 48,211)
4.1 (25); 8.4 (52); 12.7 (79); 15.9 (99)	Q1; Q2; Q3; Final	4.1 (25); 8.1 (49); 11.3 (69); 12.6 (78)	Television broadcast: Seven Network
Record: 8 Wins, 11 Losses, 1 Draw

==== Round 21 ====
Round 21
22 August (12:40 pm)	Port Adelaide	def.	Melbourne	AAMI Stadium (crowd: 21,086)
3.2 (20); 8.2 (50); 15.16 (106); 17.10 (112)	Q1; Q2; Q3; Final	2.6 (18); 5.10 (40); 8.11 (59); 11.17 (83)	Television broadcast: Foxtel
Record: 8 Wins, 12 Losses, 1 Draw

==== Round 22 ====
Round 22
29 August (4:40 pm)	Melbourne	def. by	North Melbourne	MCG (crowd: 31,064)
3.3 (21); 8.7 (55); 12.10 (82); 15.13 (103)	Q1; Q2; Q3; Final	5.4 (34); 10.7 (67); 12.8 (80); 17.11 (113)	Television broadcast: Foxtel
Record: 8 Wins, 13 Losses, 1 Draw

== Ladder ==
2010 AFL ladder
Pos	Team	Pld	W	L	D	PF	PA	PP	Pts	
1	Collingwood (P)	22	17	4	1	2349	1658	141.7	70	Finals series
2	Geelong	22	17	5	0	2518	1702	147.9	68	Finals series
3	St Kilda	22	15	6	1	1935	1591	121.6	62	Finals series
4	Western Bulldogs	22	14	8	0	2174	1734	125.4	56	Finals series
5	Sydney	22	13	9	0	2017	1863	108.3	52	Finals series
6	Fremantle	22	13	9	0	2168	2087	103.9	52	Finals series
7	Hawthorn	22	12	9	1	2044	1847	110.7	50	Finals series
8	Carlton	22	11	11	0	2143	1983	108.1	44	Finals series
9	North Melbourne	22	11	11	0	1930	2208	87.4	44	
10	Port Adelaide	22	10	12	0	1749	2123	82.4	40	
11	Adelaide	22	9	13	0	1763	1870	94.3	36	
12	Melbourne	22	8	13	1	1863	1971	94.5	34	
13	Brisbane Lions	22	7	15	0	1775	2158	82.3	28	
14	Essendon	22	7	15	0	1930	2402	80.3	28	
15	Richmond	22	6	16	0	1714	2348	73.0	24	
16	West Coast	22	4	18	0	1773	2300	77.1	16	

Source: AFL ladder
Rules for classification: 1) points; 2) percentage; 3) number of points for.
(P) Premiers

=== Ladder breakdown by opposition ===
Opponent	Played	Won	Lost	Drew	Premiership points	Points for	Points against	Percentage (%)
Sydney	1	1	0	0	4	142	69	205.80
Richmond	2	2	0	0	8	242	158	153.16
Brisbane Lions	2	2	0	0	8	177	117	151.28
Essendon	1	1	0	0	4	122	103	118.45
Collingwood	2	0	1	1	2	161	162	99.38
Western Bulldogs	1	0	1	0	0	66	70	94.29
Port Adelaide	2	1	1	0	4	194	222	87.39
Fremantle	1	0	1	0	0	71	82	86.59
North Melbourne	2	0	2	0	0	181	217	83.41
Adelaide	2	1	1	0	4	130	158	82.28
St Kilda	1	0	1	0	0	65	100	65.00
Hawthorn	2	0	2	0	0	139	216	64.35
West Coast	1	0	1	0	0	46	75	61.33
Carlton	1	0	1	0	0	58	166	59.41
Geelong	1	0	1	0	0	67	121	55.37
Total	22	8	13	1	34	1863	1971	94.52

== Awards and milestones ==
Home & Away Season
Player	Milestone	Reached
Tom Scully	AFL Debut	27 March 2010
Jack Trengove	AFL Debut	27 March 2010
James Strauss	AFL Debut	27 March 2010
Brad Green	200th AFL Game	3 April 2010
Danny Hughes	AFL Debut	7 May 2010
Jordan Gysberts	AFL Debut	29 May 2010
Brent Moloney	100th AFL Game	29 May 2010
James Frawley	50th AFL Game	29 May 2010
Matthew Warnock	50th AFL Game	27 June 2010
Jared Rivers	100th AFL Game	4 July 2010
Colin Sylvia	100th AFL Game	8 August 2010
James McDonald	250th AFL Game	22 August 2010
Cale Morton	50th AFL Game	29 August 2010

== China Tour ==
Melbourne competed in the Kaspersky Cup Exhibition Match against the Brisbane Lions on 17 October in Shanghai, China winning by 5 points. Liam Jurrah kicked 5 goals in front of an estimated 5,000 crowd.

Exhibition Match
17 October (2:10 pm)	Melbourne	def.	Brisbane Lions	Jiangwan Sports Centre, Shanghai (crowd: 5,000 est)
1.4 (10); 4.7 (31); 6.8 (45); 12.12 (84)	Q1; Q2; Q3; Final	3.5 (23); 5.8 (38); 10.11 (71); 11.13 (79)
Jurrah 5, Sylvia 2, Morton 2, Spencer, Bennell, Jamar	Goals	Rockliff 3, Beams 3, Dyson 2, Rich, Buchanan, Rich
Jurrah, Newton, Bartram, Dunn, Sylvia	Best	Rockliff, Dyson, Beams, Merrett, Rich

== Awards ==
Melbourne's annual Best and Fairest night was held on 2 September, at Crown Casino. Brad Green capped off an excellent year, winning his first Keith 'Bluey' Truscott Trophy, finishing 18 votes ahead of defender James Frawley, and also winning the Ron Barassi Leadership Award and the Leading Goalkicker Award.

Best and Fairest Top Ten

Position	Player	Votes
1st	Brad Green	(295)
2nd	James Frawley	(277)
3rd	Mark Jamar	(231)
4th	Aaron Davey	(194)
5th	Colin Sylvia	(170)
6th	Cameron Bruce	(168)
7th	Brent Moloney	(166)
8th	Tom Scully	(154)
9th	Colin Garland	(149)
10th	James McDonald	(149)

Keith 'Bluey' Truscott Trophy – Brad Green

Sid Anderson Memorial Trophy (Second in the Best and Fairest) – James Frawley

Ron Barassi Snr Memorial Trophy (Third in the Best and Fairest) – Mark Jamar

Ivor Warne-Smith Memorial Trophy (Fourth in the Best and Fairest) – Aaron Davey

Dick Taylor Memorial Trophy (Fifth in the Best and Fairest) – Colin Sylvia

Harold Ball Memorial Trophy (Best First Year Player) – Tom Scully

Troy Broadbridge Trophy (highest polling MFC player in the Casey Best and Fairest) – Brad Miller

Ron Barassi Leadership Award – Brad Green

Ian Ridley Club Ambassador Award – Colin Sylvia

Norm Smith Memorial Trophy (Coach's Award) – Jordie McKenzie

Leading Goalkicker Award – Brad Green (55)

== Brownlow Medal ==
=== Results ===
Round	1 vote	2 votes	3 votes
1	Sam Mitchell (Hawthorn)	Jordan Lewis (Hawthorn)	Luke Hodge (Hawthorn)
2	Ricky Petterd (Melbourne)	Alan Didak (Collingwood)	Aaron Davey (Melbourne)
3	James McDonald (Melbourne)	Bernie Vince (Adelaide)	Jack Grimes (Melbourne)
4	Brent Moloney (Melbourne)	James McDonald (Melbourne)	Brad Green (Melbourne)
5	Nathan Jones (Melbourne)	James Frawley (Melbourne)	Brent Moloney (Melbourne)
6	Michael Firrito (North Melbourne)	Cameron Bruce (Melbourne	Daniel Wells (North Melbourne)
7	Shaun Higgins (Western Bulldogs)	Daniel Giansiracusa (Western Bulldogs)	Tom Scully (Melbourne)
8	Mark LeCras (West Coast)	James McDonald (Melbourne)	Matt Priddis (West Coast)
9	Colin Sylvia (Melbourne)	Aaron Davey (Melbourne)	Travis Boak (Port Adelaide)
10	Joel Selwood (Geelong)	James Podsiadly (Geelong)	Gary Ablett (Geelong)
11	Heath Scotland (Carlton)	Chris Judd (Carlton)	Brent Moloney (Melbourne)
12	Mark Jamar (Melbourne)	Dane Swan (Collingwood)	Aaron Davey (Melbourne)
13	Kurt Tippett (Adelaide)	Simon Goodwin (Adelaide)	Graham Johncock (Adelaide)
14	Brendon Goddard (St Kilda)	Leigh Montagna (St Kilda)	Clinton Jones (St Kilda)
15	Colin Sylvia (Melbourne)	Mark Jamar (Melbourne)	Brad Green (Melbourne)
16	Anthony Morabito (Fremantle)	Colin Sylvia (Melbourne)	Hayden Ballantyne (Fremantle)
17	James Frawley (Melbourne)	Aaron Davey (Melbourne)	Colin Sylvia (Melbourne)
18	Joel Macdonald (Melbourne)	Mark Jamar (Melbourne)	Colin Sylvia (Melbourne)
19	Daniel Jackson (Richmond)	Liam Jurrah (Melbourne)	Lynden Dunn (Melbourne)
20	Lance Franklin (Hawthorn)	Shaun Burgoyne (Hawthorn)	Brad Sewell (Hawthorn)
21	Domenic Cassisi (Port Adelaide)	Cameron Bruce (Melbourne)	Travis Boak (Port Adelaide)
22	Brady Rawlings (North Melbourne)	Brent Harvey (North Melbourne)	Levi Greenwood (North Melbourne)

=== Brownlow Medal tally ===
Player	1 vote games	2 vote games	3 vote games	Total votes
Aaron Davey	2	1	2	(10)
Colin Sylvia	0	2	2	(10)
Brent Moloney	1	0	2	(7)
Brad Green	0	0	2	(6)
James McDonald	1	2	0	(5)
Mark Jamar	1	2	0	(5)
Cameron Bruce	0	2	0	(4)
Jack Grimes	0	0	1	(3)
James Frawley	1	1	0	(3)
Tom Scully	0	0	1	(3)
Lynden Dunn	0	0	1	(3)
Liam Jurrah	0	1	0	(2)
Ricky Petterd	1	0	0	(1)
Nathan Jones	1	0	0	(1)
Joel Macdonald	1	0	0	(1)
Total	9	11	11	(64)
