= Cameron Bruce =

Australian rules footballer and coach (born 1979)

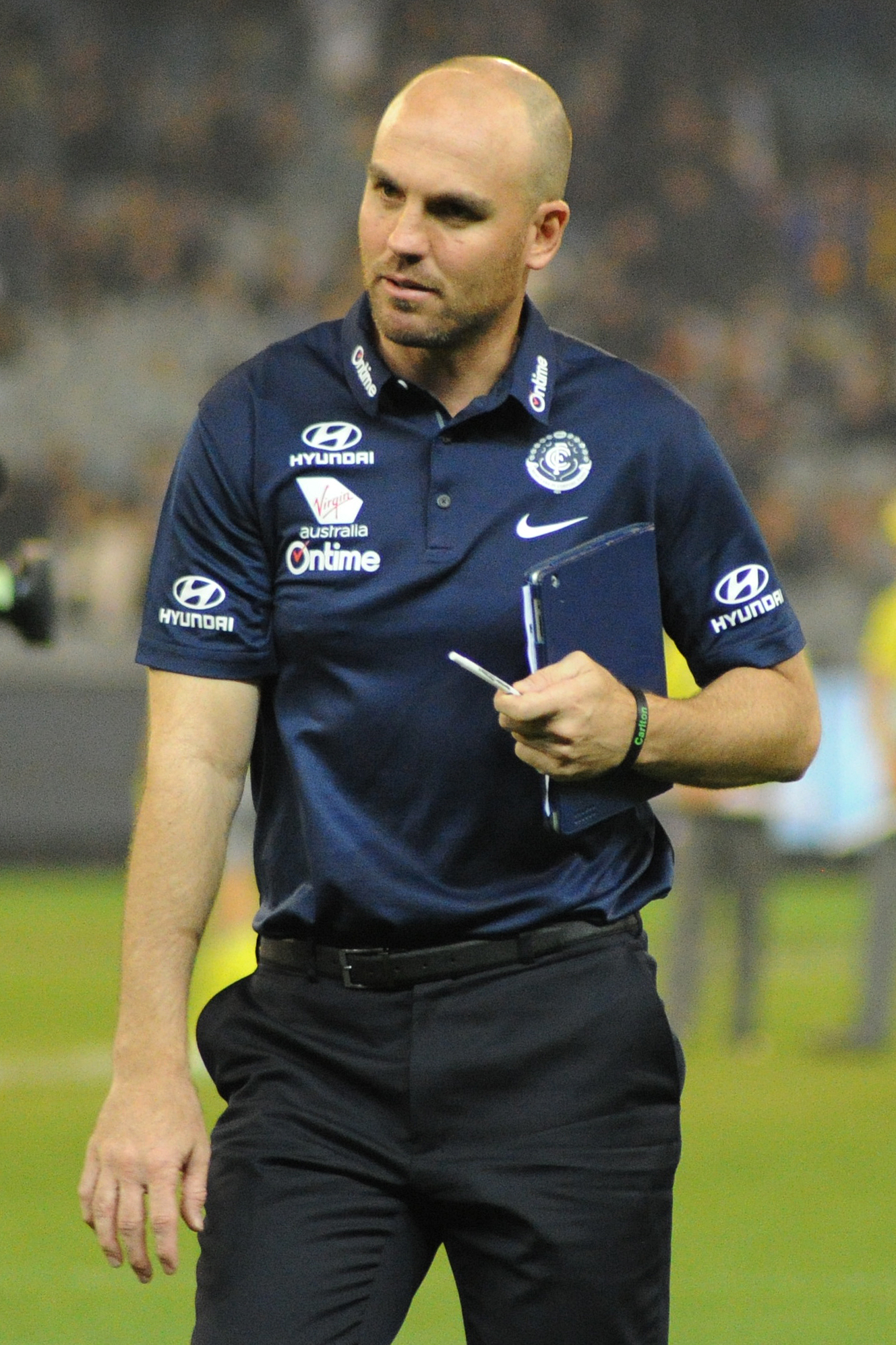
- Bruce in 2018

Personal information
- Born: 30 September 1979 (age 47)
- Original team: MHS Old Boys (VAFA)
- Draft: No. 64, 1999 national draft
- Debut: Round 1, 2000, Melbourne vs. Richmond, at Melbourne Cricket Ground
- Height: 190 cm (6 ft 3 in)
- Weight: 89 kg (196 lb)
- Position: Midfield

Club information
- Current club: Brisbane Lions (senior coach)

Playing career^{1}
Years	Club	Games (Goals)
2000–2010	Melbourne	224 (210)
2011–2012	Hawthorn	10 (1)
Total		234 (211)

Coaching career
Years	Club	Games (W–L–D)
2027–	Brisbane Lions	0 (0–0–0)
- ^{1} Playing statistics correct to the end of 2012.

Career highlights
- Keith 'Bluey' Truscott Medallist: 2008; Melbourne captain: 2008

Cameron Bruce (born 30 September 1979) is an Australian rules football coach and former player. He was appointed the senior coach of the Brisbane Lions in November 2026.

He played for both the Melbourne Football Club and the Hawthorn Football Club in the Australian Football League (AFL). During his playing career he was known for his aerobic capacity and kicking skills.

== Early life and playing career ==
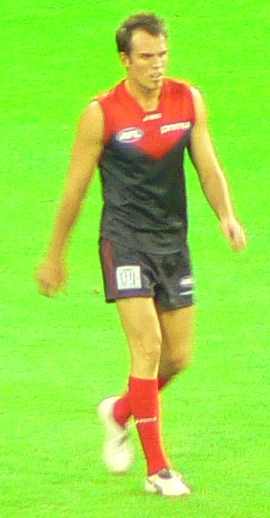
Bruce in 2007

Bruce attended Melbourne High School and played for Melbourne High School Old Boys following his schooling.

=== Melbourne Football Club ===
Bruce was drafted in 1999 at the relatively mature age of 20. He was Melbourne's last selection in that year's draft, taken as the club's sixth pick, and 64th overall, behind team-mates Brad Green, Paul Wheatley and Matthew Whelan. At 20, and after one year in Melbourne's junior development squad, he made his debut for the Demons' senior team against Richmond in Round 1 of the 2000 season, kicking a goal with his first kick in AFL football. He played in Melbourne's run to the grand final, but had to withdraw from the final match of the season due to injury. Given the number 32 guernsey, he quickly adapted to AFL football, receiving a AFL Rising Star nomination in his debut season and finishing runner-up to David Neitz in the club's best-and-fairest award in 2002. He was a member of the International Rules sides of 2002 and 2004.

==== Developing his game ====
Bruce developed his game as a midfielder, but from 2005 he was used in attack, across half-back and also as a tagger – the latter role seen notably through his tagging of high-profile players such as James Hird, Chris Judd, Adam Goodes and Nathan Buckley. Because of his ability to adapt to new positions and roles within the side, versatility is often highlighted as one of his main strengths, and he has been regarded as the most versatile player in the league at various stages throughout his career. He enjoyed a solid run of form in 2004, which he managed 34 goals for the year, including a seven-goal haul against Carlton in round six. He carried the form through to the 2005 season – enjoying a particularly fruitful period early in the season – before suffering a serious shoulder injury sustained from a heavy tackle which ended his season prematurely.

==== Established player ====
In 2006, he played a pivotal role in Melbourne's eight-game winning run, which came on the back of losing their first three matches of the season. He kicked the winning goal against Sydney in round 4 and received 10 Brownlow votes throughout the season. He finished second in the club's best-and-fairest and had one of his more consistent seasons – he was one of only two players to average more than 22 disposals and kick more than 20 goals for the season. (The other was Chris Judd.) The 2007 season was hugely disappointing for Melbourne, where they were unable to convert narrow losses into wins and being outclassed on other occasions. Bruce celebrated his 150-game milestone in Round 4, and averaged 24 possessions for the season. He achieved a career-high of 35 possessions against the Kangaroos in Round 9, but his goal tally was well down on previous seasons, kicking just nine majors for the season. His preparations for the 2008 season were hampered by injuries suffered in pre-season, but he was selected in Round 1 and played in the first fourteen matches of the season for Melbourne. New Demons coach Dean Bailey used Bruce chiefly in defence in the early stages of the season, where he picked up Brad Johnson and Cameron Mooney among others. Bailey handed Bruce a more attacking role during the middle of the season, generally playing either off half-back as a rebounding defender, or on the wing. Bruce kicked two goals in all three of Melbourne's wins for the season. He played in all 22 of Melbourne's matches for the season (the only Demon player to do so) and averaged more than 24 disposals per game. He won Melbourne's best-and-fairest for the season, polling 75 votes – 15 more than second-place Brock McLean.

==== Melbourne leader ====
Following the retirement of David Neitz in 2008, Bruce was named co-captain of the team alongside James McDonald for the remainder of the season. This came on the back of his role in the leadership group in 2007. McDonald was named as permanent captain for 2009, with Bruce as vice-captain. Bruce resumed his place in the midfield for 2009 and rotated equally between the forward- and back-flanks. He recorded 30 disposals and nine marks against Collingwood in Round 2. He kicked the 200th goal of his career in a 22-point loss to Hawthorn in Round 9. Bruce played his 200th game in round 16, 2009.

=== Hawthorn Football Club ===
In November 2010, it was reported that Bruce had been training with the Hawthorn Football Club after being given permission by the AFL. He was subsequently drafted by the Hawks with the fifth selection in the pre-season draft. A few hours after he had been drafted by the Hawks, Bruce revealed on SEN, a Melbourne-based sports-talkback radio station, that he had already been handed the number 17 guernsey made famous by Hawthorn legend Michael Tuck.

Midway through the 2012 season, Bruce announced his retirement from football, citing a persistent back injury as the cause. He retired having played 234 AFL games, including 10 with the Hawks, and kicked 211 goals.

== Coaching career ==
=== Hawthorn Football Club ===
Bruce was appointed as an assistant coach in the role of development coach with the Hawthorn Football Club in 2013 under senior coach Alastair Clarkson. After impressing in his role as a development coach, he was promoted to a senior assistant coach with the Hawks in late 2013. On 22 August 2017, it was announced that Bruce would leave Hawthorn at the end of the 2017 season to become a senior assistant coach at Carlton.

=== Carlton Football Club ===
At the end of the 2017 season, Bruce joined the Carlton Football Club as senior assistant coach under senior coach Brendon Bolton. At the end of the 2021 season, Bruce left the Carlton Football Club due to a clean-out at the club, after an extensive review of the club's football operations.

=== Brisbane Lions ===
On 20 September 2021, it was announced that Bruce had joined the Brisbane Lions as an assistant coach in the position of midfield coach under senior coach Chris Fagan.

On 9 November 2026, Bruce was appointed as the senior coach of the Brisbane Lions following the resignation of triple premiership senior coach Chris Fagan.

== Statistics ==
Legend
G	Goals	K	Kicks	D	Disposals	T	Tackles
B	Behinds	H	Handballs	M	Marks

Season	Team	No.	Games	Totals							Averages (per game)							Votes
Season	Team	No.	Games	G	B	K	H	D	M	T	G	B	K	H	D	M	T	Votes
2000	Melbourne	32	19	22	13	110	78	188	54	14	1.2	0.7	5.8	4.1	9.9	2.8	0.7	0
2001	Melbourne	32	22	31	18	148	105	253	81	34	1.4	0.8	6.7	4.8	11.5	3.7	1.5	0
2002	Melbourne	32	24	20	11	216	152	368	121	47	0.8	0.5	9.0	6.3	15.3	5.0	2.0	0
2003	Melbourne	32	20	25	18	205	137	342	101	34	1.3	0.9	10.3	6.9	17.1	5.1	1.7	8
2004	Melbourne	32	22	34	23	229	199	428	99	81	1.5	1.0	10.4	9.0	19.5	4.5	3.7	9
2005	Melbourne	32	15	20	14	167	93	260	73	27	1.3	0.9	11.1	6.2	17.3	4.9	1.8	8
2006	Melbourne	32	24	21	19	303	234	537	175	100	0.9	0.8	12.6	9.8	22.4	7.3	4.2	10
2007	Melbourne	32	16	9	14	194	183	377	96	66	0.6	0.9	12.1	11.4	23.6	6.0	4.1	5
2008	Melbourne	32	22	13	12	244	287	531	147	77	0.6	0.5	11.1	13.0	24.1	6.7	3.5	2
2009	Melbourne	32	19	9	8	213	266	479	114	58	0.5	0.4	11.2	14.0	25.2	6.0	3.1	0
2010	Melbourne	32	21	6	7	210	304	514	116	73	0.3	0.3	10.0	14.5	24.5	5.5	3.5	4
2011	Hawthorn	17	9	1	4	67	95	162	50	28	0.1	0.4	7.4	10.6	18.0	5.6	3.1	0
2012	Hawthorn	17	1	0	0	4	4	8	2	0	0.0	0.0	4.0	4.0	8.0	2.0	0.0	0
Career			234	211	161	2310	2137	4447	1229	639	0.9	0.7	9.9	9.1	19.0	5.3	2.7	46

== Honours and achievements ==
Team

- Minor premiership (Hawthorn): 2012

Individual

- Keith 'Bluey' Truscott Medal: 2008
- Melbourne captain: 2008
- Australian international rules football team: 2002, 2004
- AFL Rising Star nominee: 2000
