= 2009 AFL Under 18 Championships =

Youth Australian rules football competition

- Teams: 8

Division 1
- Teams: 4
- Champions: Western Australia
- Larke Medal: David Swallow; Andrew Hooper

Division 2
- Teams: 4
- Champions: NSW/ACT
- Hunter Harrison Medal: Dylan McNeil

The 2009 AFL Under-18 Championships was the 2009 series of the AFL Under 18 Championships, a state and territory-based Australian rules football competition which showcases the best junior footballers in Australia, primarily with the aim for them to be drafted into the Australian Football League.

This year's competition was played with just one division compared to two from previous years. The competing teams will be Victoria (split into separate Country and Metropolitan teams), South Australia, Western Australia, Northern Territory, a combined New South Wales and Australian Capital Territory team, Tasmania and Queensland. Each team played five games, with teams playing each team from their division from last year plus two from the other division.

== Fixture ==
Date	Home team	Score	Away team	Score	Venue	Time
Sat 23/5	Queensland	10-9(69)	NSW/ACT	14-10(94)	Visy Park	11:15am
Sat 23/5	Tasmania	14-13(97)	Northern Territory	16-10(106)	Visy Park	2pm
Sat 30/5	Western Australia	19-12(126)	South Australia	12-7(79)	Subiaco Oval	2:20pm
Sun 31/5	Victoria Country	14-6(90)	Victoria Metro	11-8(74)	Skilled Stadium	1:30pm
Fri 5/6	Northern Territory	6-9(45)	Western Australia	16-12(108)	TIO Stadium	6pm
Sat 6/6	NSW/ACT	8-1(49)	Victoria Metro	24-16(160)	Rouse Hill	10am
Sat 6/6	Queensland	8-5(53)	South Australia	12-12(84)	Rouse Hill	12:30pm
Sun 7/6	Tasmania	10-11(71)	Victoria Country	12-13(85)	Bellerive Oval	11:30am
Sat 13/6	Western Australia	21-6(132)	Victoria Metro	10-9(69)	Subiaco Oval	11am
Sun 14/6	South Australia	16-9(105)	Victoria Country	7-12(54)	AAMI Stadium	1:10pm
Sat 20/6	NSW/ACT	12-10(82)	Northern Territory	11-8(74)	ANZ Stadium	4:40pm
Sat 20/6	Tasmania	16-14(110)	Queensland	7-6(48)	Aurora Stadium	11am
Fri 26/6	NSW/ACT	5-9(39)	South Australia	18-11(119)	Visy Park	2:45pm
Sat 27/6	Victoria Country	13-10(88)	Northern Territory	5-6(36)	Casey Fields	11am
Sat 27/6	Victoria Metro	8-7(55)	Queensland	7-7(49)	Casey Fields	1pm
Sat 27/6	Tasmania	3-2(20)	Western Australia	23-10(148)	Casey Fields	3pm
Wed 1/7	Tasmania	6-11(47)	NSW/ACT	13-6(84)	Etihad Stadium	9:35am
Wed 1/7	Queensland	8-11(59)	Northern Territory	9-6(60)	Etihad Stadium	11:40am
Wed 1/7	Victoria Country	9-8(62)	Western Australia	16-14(110)	Etihad Stadium	1:45pm
Wed 1/7	Victoria Metro	9-7(61)	South Australia	10-13(73)	Etihad Stadium	3:50pm

LADDER

Division 1 Table

TEAM	WON	LOST	FOR	AGAINST	PERCENTAGE
Western Australia	5	0	624	275	226.91%
South Australia	4	1	460	333	138.14%
Victoria Country	3	2	379	396	95.71%
NSW/ACT	3	2	348	469	74.20%
Victoria Metro	2	3	419	393	106.62%
Northern Territory	2	3	321	434	73.96%
Tasmania	1	4	345	471	73.25%
Queensland	0	5	278	403	68.98%

Division 1 Champions: Western Australia

Larke Medallists(Best in Division One): David Swallow(WA) and Andrew Hooper(Vic Country)

Division 2 Champions: NSW/ACT

Harrison Medallists(Best in Division 2): Dylan McNeil(NSW/ACT)

== 2009 AFL Under-18 All-Australian team ==
The 2009 Under-18 All-Australian team was announced following the conclusion of the 2009 AFL Under 18 Championships on 4 July 2009. The sponsored name of the squad is the 2009 NAB AFL Under-18 All-Australian team, due to sponsorship arrangements with the National Australia Bank (NAB). The team was selected by a panel which was chaired by the AFL national talent manager Kevin Sheehan, and consisted of Alan McConnell and Jason McCartney from the AFL, as well as recruiters Matt Rendell, Bryce Lewis, Graham Hadley and Francis Jackson. The championship-winning Western Australia earned the most selections, with nine of the 22 selections, as well as the coach position in the team. Both the Larke Medallists, David Swallow (WA) and Andrew Hooper (Victoria Country), and the Hunter-Harrison Medallist, Dylan McNeil (NSW/ACT), were selected for the squad. Seventeen of the 22 players in the side were eligible for the 2009 AFL draft, with nine ultimately selected in the first or priority rounds.

2009 AFL Under-18 All-Australian team
B:	Andrew Hooper (Victoria Country)	Blayne Wilson (Western Australia)	Bradley Sheppard (Western Australia)
HB:	Josh Toy (Victoria Metro)	Daniel Talia (Victoria Metro)	David Swallow (Western Australia)
C:	Anthony Morabito (Western Australia)	Dustin Martin (Victoria Country)	Mitch Duncan (Western Australia)
HF:	Kane Lucas (Western Australia)	Jack Darling (Western Australia)	Gary Rohan (Victoria Country)
F:	Brandon Matera (Western Australia)	Matthew Panos (South Australia)	Ben Cunnington (Victoria Country)
Foll:	James Craig (South Australia)	Jack Trengove (South Australia)	Tom Scully (Victoria Metro)
Int:	Luke Tapscott (South Australia)	Ryan Harwood (Tasmania)	Dylan McNeil (NSW/ACT)
Int:	Travis Colyer (Western Australia)		
Coach:	Andrew Lockyer (Western Australia) — Assistant coach: Brenton Phillips (South Australia)		
