= Jordan Gysberts =

Australian rules footballer (born 1991)

Personal information
- Full name: Jordan Gysberts
- Born: 11 June 1991 (age 35)
- Original teams: Norwood Football Club (Victoria); Yarra Valley Grammar; Eastern Ranges (TAC Cup)
- Draft: No. 11, 2009 national draft
- Debut: Round 10, 29 May 2010, Melbourne vs. Geelong, at Skilled Stadium, Geelong
- Height: 189 cm (6 ft 2 in)
- Weight: 82 kg (181 lb)
- Position: Midfielder

Playing career^{1}
Years	Club	Games (Goals)
2010–2012	Melbourne	19 (3)
2013	North Melbourne	0 (0)
Total		19 (3)
- ^{1} Playing statistics correct to the end of 2013.

Career highlights
- 2× AFL Rising Star nominee: 2010, 2011

Jordan Gysberts (born 11 June 1991) is an Australian rules footballer who previously played for the Melbourne Football Club and the North Melbourne Football Club in Australian Football League (AFL).

== Junior career ==
Gysberts played his junior football with the Eastern Ranges in the TAC Cup and for Yarra Valley Grammar, where he played as an inside midfielder with good kicking skills. Gysberts also represented the Vic Metro side in the 2008 and 2009 NAB AFL Under-18 Championships and averaged 23 disposals a game in the TAC Cup in 2009 for the Eastern Ranges.

Gysberts was named best on ground for the AFL/AIS Under 18 team during its 2009 Cape Town match against the South Africa national Australian rules football team.

== AFL career ==
Gysberts was drafted by the Melbourne Football Club in the 2009 AFL National Draft with the 11th overall selection, which Melbourne received in return for trading Brock McLean to the Carlton Football Club. Gysberts was given Brock McLean's number 5 guernsey, which was presented to him by former Melbourne legend Gerard Healy.

After a series of good performances for Melbourne's VFL-affiliate, the Casey Scorpions, Gysberts was selected by the Melbourne match committee to debut against the Geelong Football Club in Round 10 of the 2010 AFL Season. In an impressive debut, Gysberts amassed 26 disposals for the game, the most of any Melbourne player, and was named as one of Melbourne's best players in their 54-point loss to Geelong. Gysberts repeated the effort of leading Melbourne's possessions in his second game, with 27 overall and also recording four clearances, for which he was awarded a Rising Star nomination, becoming the third Melbourne player, after Jack Trengove and Tom Scully, to be nominated for the Rising Star in 2010. Gysberts was again nominated for the Rising Star award after his Round 11, 2011 match against Essendon.

At the end of the 2012 season, Gysberts was traded to the North Melbourne Football Club with the 63rd pick in that draft, in exchange for Cameron Pedersen and the 74th pick.

At the end of the 2013 season, Gysberts was delisted by North Melbourne Football Club.
