= Arthur Sowden =

Australian rules footballer (1878–1954)

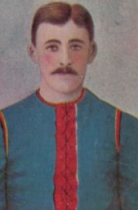

Personal information
- Full name: Arthur Sowden
- Born: 6 April 1878; Chelsea, London
- Died: 24 December 1954 (aged 76); Caulfield, Victoria
- Original team: Caulfield
- Position: Wing

Playing career^{1}
Years	Club	Games (Goals)
1899–1906	Melbourne	117 (13)
- ^{1} Playing statistics correct to the end of 1906.

Career highlights
- Melbourne captain: 1906

Arthur Sowden (6 April 1878 – 24 December 1954) was an Australian rules footballer who played with Melbourne in the Victorian Football League (VFL).

Sowden played as a wingman and represented the VFL in an interstate fixture against South Australia in 1902. He was captain of Melbourne in the 1906 VFL season, his last.
