= Daniel Hughes (Australian footballer) =

Australian rules footballer

Personal information
- Full name: Daniel Hughes
- Born: 10 December 1986 (age 39)
- Original team: Sandringham (VFL) Sandringham Dragons / Hampton Rovers
- Draft: Selection 25 (2006 Rookie Draft); Selection 33 (2009 Rookie Draft)
- Height: 188 cm (6 ft 2 in)
- Weight: 83 kg (183 lb)
- Position: Forward

Club information
- Current club: Subiaco
- Number: 22

Playing career^{1}
Years	Club	Games (Goals)
2009–2010	Melbourne	2 (2)
- ^{1} Playing statistics correct to the end of 2010.

Daniel "Danny" Hughes (born 10 December 1986) is an Australian rules footballer in the Australian Football League (AFL).

He was recruited from Sandringham (VFL) via Sandringham Dragons and the Hampton Rovers Football Club with the 25th selection in the 2006 AFL Rookie Draft, before being delisted at the end of the 2007 season. After missing most of the 2008 season with a hip injury, he was redrafted onto Melbourne's rookie list, with selection 33 in the 2009 Rookie Draft and was retained for the 2010 season. He plays as a small-medium forward and has played for both the Sandringham Zebras and Casey Scorpions in the Victorian Football League whilst on the Melbourne list. Hughes finally made his AFL debut, over four years after he was first drafted, in Round 7 of the 2010 season against the Western Bulldogs at the MCG, replacing Ricky Petterd, who was injured the previous week. He kicked one goal in his debut game and played the following week against West Coast, when he again kicked one goal. Hughes was dropped after the match against West Coast and did not play another match in Melbourne's senior team for the remainder of the 2010 season. He was delisted by Melbourne at the end of the 2010 season.
