= Blayne Wilson =

Australian rules footballer (born 1992)

Personal information
- Full name: Blayne Wilson
- Born: 26 January 1992 (age 34)
- Original team: Halls Head JFC
- Draft: 2nd pick, 2011 Pre-season draft
- Height: 189 cm (6 ft 2 in)
- Weight: 88 kg (194 lb)
- Position: Defender

Playing career^{1}
Years	Club	Games (Goals)
2011–2014	West Coast	9 (0)
- ^{1} Playing statistics correct to the end of 2014.

Career highlights
- WAFL premiership player: 2020; Western Australia under-18 team 2009; Under-18 All-Australian team 2009

Blayne Wilson (born 26 January 1992) is an Australian rules footballer who previously played with the West Coast Eagles in the Australian Football League (AFL). From Mandurah, Western Australia, he represented his state at the 2009 National Under-18 Championships, and was selected as full-back in that year's under-18 All-Australian team. In the West Australian Football League, Wilson made his senior debut for Peel Thunder during the 2009 season, playing four games, and went on to play another seven games during the 2010 season, but was hampered by osteitis pubis and ankle injuries, missing several games. In part due to these injury concerns, he was overlooked in the 2010 National draft (held in November 2010), despite having been considered likely to be drafted in the early rounds. Wilson was subsequently invited to train with West Coast during the pre-season, and was drafted by the club with the second selection in the following month's 2011 Pre-season draft.

Unable to break into West Coast's senior line-up immediately, Wilson established himself as a defender in Peel Thunder's senior team, playing seventeen games during the 2011 season. He played a further eight games for Peel during the following season, but missed the second half of the season due to ankle injuries. Prior to the 2013 season, Wilson switched WAFL clubs to East Perth as part of West Coast's newly implemented alignment with the club. Wilson made his senior debut for West Coast against St Kilda in round ten of the 2013 season, replacing the injured Darren Glass. In the match, played at Etihad Stadium, he recorded 21 disposals and ten marks.

Wilson was delisted at the end of the 2014 AFL season. He joined South Fremantle for the 2015 WAFL season.
