= Joel Macdonald =

Australian footballer and businessman (born 1984)

- Born: Australia
- Education: Monash University
- Occupations: Entrepreneur, Australian rules footballer

Joel Macdonald (born 10 October 1984) is a businessman and former Australian rules footballer.

He is the co-founder and former President of software company, GetSwift. Prior to starting GetSwift, Macdonald was an Australian rules footballer, playing for the Melbourne Football Club and the Brisbane Lions in the Australian Football League (AFL).

== Early life ==
Joel Macdonald

Personal information
- Full name: Joel Macdonald
- Born: 10 October 1984 (age 42)
- Original team: Mt Gravatt (QAFL)
- Draft: No. 70, 2003 Rookie Draft, Brisbane Lions; No. 1, 2010 Pre-Season Draft, Melbourne
- Height / weight: 188cm / 88kg
- Position: Defender

Playing career^{1}
| Years | Club | Games (Goals) |
| 2004–2009 | Brisbane Lions | 80 (6) |
| 2010–2013 | Melbourne | 44 (0) |
| Total | | 124 (6) |
- ^{1} Playing statistics correct to the end of 2013.

Macdonald grew up in Melbourne and Brisbane, Australia. He graduated from Brisbane Grammar School. He was recruited by the Brisbane Lions through the 2003 Rookie Draft as a Queensland Zone player (QLD Zone) from Mt Gravatt. He made his debut for the Brisbane Lions in Round 10, 2004.

After the 2009 AFL season, the Brisbane Lions delisted Macdonald along with 11 other players. In December 2009, Macdonald was drafted to Melbourne with the first selection in the pre-season draft. Macdonald appeared in 125 senior games over 11 years before he retired from football on 16 August 2013.

== Business career ==
=== Liquorun (2013–2014) ===
In July 2013, Macdonald founded Liquorun, an on-demand alcohol delivery service with two other Melbourne players, James Strauss and Rohan Bail. The service expanded to operate across major Australian cities.

=== GetSwift (2014–present) ===
In 2014, Macdonald re-branded the company as GetSwift, pivoting the delivery business in the process.

In 2016, GetSwift listed on the Australian Securities Exchange . In June 2017, the company raised a further AUD$24 million and began announcing major partnerships. In November 2017, GetSwift announced a deal with Amazon along with funding, resulting in an 80% increase in their share price and putting Macdonald on Australia's "young rich list". The claim prompted the Australian Securities Exchange to halt trading in GetSwift shares until Amazon affirmed the deal but said GetSwift should not have disclosed it. In December 2017 GetSwift raised a further AUD$100M.

In January 2018, as part of an investigation by the Australian Financial Review, GetSwift and Macdonald were alleged to have misled the market by overstating forecasts to the public and failed to disclose the loss of major contracts. The company was again suspended from trade after inadequately addressing questions by the Australian Securities Exchange.

The company appointed PriceWaterhouseCoopers to investigate their compliance and MacDonald later admitted less than half of the contracts announced had resulted in revenue.

The company was at one stage facing three class actions, including a $300M suit lodged in the Federal Court where MacDonald is named as a defendant. The Federal Court of Australia delivered its initial judgement on 23 May that the court had permanently stayed two of the three class actions in favor for GetSwift. The company is contesting the accusation and has separately accused Squire Patton Boggs of overstating the claim to A$300M.

In February 2018, the Australian Securities and Investments Commission lodged an investigation into the Company. In April 2018, MacDonald stepped down as CEO, assuming the title of President and remained a director of the company.

In February 2019, the Australian Securities and Investments Commission commenced legal action against GetSwift and its principals, MacDonald and Bane Hunter, for misleading claims about contracts with corporate clients for use of their product. In August 2022, GetSwift's former co-founder James Strauss launched legal action against Macdonald for misleading and deceptive conduct, accusing Macdonald of making several misleading statements that prevented Strauss from selling his stake in GetSwift after it listed on the Australian Securities exchange in 2016.

== Legal issues ==
In January 2018 while CEO of GetSwift, Macdonald was accused of misleading the market by overstating revenue forecasts the public and failing to disclose the loss of what GetSwift claimed were not materially significant contracts. Macdonald's company GetSwift requested to enter into a voluntary Trading Halt while they responded to questions by the Australian Securities Exchange. This is the second time Macdonald's company has been suspended from trade, after the Australian Securities Exchange issued a trading halt and requested more information after the company announced a deal with Amazon.

=== Class action lawsuit ===
In February 2018 MacDonald was named defendant along with his company GetSwift in a A$300M class action lodged in the Federal Court of Australia for failing to disclose price sensitive information to the public. Shares in his company GetSwift suffered a 67% loss in the two days after the action was announced. The company is contesting the accusation and has separately accused Squire Patton Boggs of overstating the claim. The Federal Court found GetSwift made misleading statements and breached its continuous disclosure obligations when making statements to the Australian Securities Exchange (ASX) between February and December 2017. In 2023, Macdonald and his company, GetSwift, were penalized for breaching Australia's continuous disclosure laws, in the amount of $1 million and $15 million, respectively. Macdonald was found guilty on 33 counts of misleading conduct and disqualified from managing corporations for 12 years.

The Court also found GetSwift directors Bane Hunter and Macdonald failed to meet their obligations as directors due to their involvement in the announcements made to the ASX, and that they were both knowingly concerned in multiple continuous disclosure breaches made by GetSwift.

ASIC Deputy Chair Sarah Court said "Listed companies and their directors have obligations to the Australian market to ensure their statements are not misleading. Investors need to have accurate information at their disposal to make informed decisions".

== Reception ==
In 2017, he made his debut on the Financial Review's list of the top 100 richest young Australians, with an estimated net worth of over $100 million but his net-worth fell in March 2018 after his company GetSwift was later found guilty of breaching ASX listing rules 3.1.
