= Andrew Hooper =

Australian rules footballer

Personal information
- Full name: Andrew Hooper
- Born: 18 January 1991 (age 35)
- Original team: North Ballarat Rebels (TAC Cup)
- Draft: No. 35, 2010 Rookie Draft
- Height: 172 cm (5 ft 8 in)
- Weight: 83 kg (183 lb)
- Position: Forward

Playing career^{1}
Years	Club	Games (Goals)
2010–2012	Western Bulldogs	7 (7)
- ^{1} Playing statistics correct to the end of 2012.

Career highlights
- Larke Medal 2009

Andrew Hooper (born 18 January 1991) is an Australian rules footballer who played for the Western Bulldogs in the Australian Football League (AFL). Hooper became the first player to make his VFL/AFL debut in a finals match since Paul Spargo in 1985.

== Junior career ==
Hooper began playing Australian rules football with Golden Point Football Club in the Ballarat Football League. He then played for the North Ballarat Rebels in the TAC Cup competition in 2009. Hooper was selected to play for the Victorian Country side at the AFL Under-18 Championships and he was the joint-winner of the Larke Medal, with David Swallow, awarded to the best and fairest player at the championships. Despite tearing his calf muscle two weeks before the AFL Draft Camp, Hooper still participated, coming second in the agility test, third in the 20 m sprint and equal third in the standing vertical jump.

== AFL career ==
Although Hooper had an impressive junior career, there were concerns that he would struggle at AFL level due to his small height of 172 cm. As such, he was overlooked in the 2009 National Draft, but was taken by the Western Bulldogs with the 35th draft pick in the 2010 Rookie Draft.

After overcoming injuries at the start of 2010, Hooper played with the Bulldogs' VFL-affiliate side Williamstown for the majority of the season, where he became a "cult-figure" and increasingly important player as the Seagulls finished on top of the VFL ladder. As a result of his performances with Williamstown, Hooper was pushing for senior selection throughout the season. He was promoted to the primary list for round 15 and was named as an emergency the same round. He also came close to making his debut in a round 22 match against Essendon. Hooper instead made his AFL debut in the Western Bulldogs' semi final match against Sydney. In doing so, he became the first player to make his debut in a finals match in 25 years. Described as having a "giant influence", Hooper had five possessions and kicked a goal, which sparked the Bulldogs' comeback. The Herald Sun claimed that, after his performance, Hooper would "no doubt be back [next week]". However, he was dropped for the preliminary final match against St Kilda and the Bulldogs lost, ending their finals campaign.

Hooper was promoted to the Bulldogs' senior list with the 110th selection in the 2010 AFL draft and signed a two-year contract with the club.
