= Jack Grimes (footballer) =

Australian rules footballer

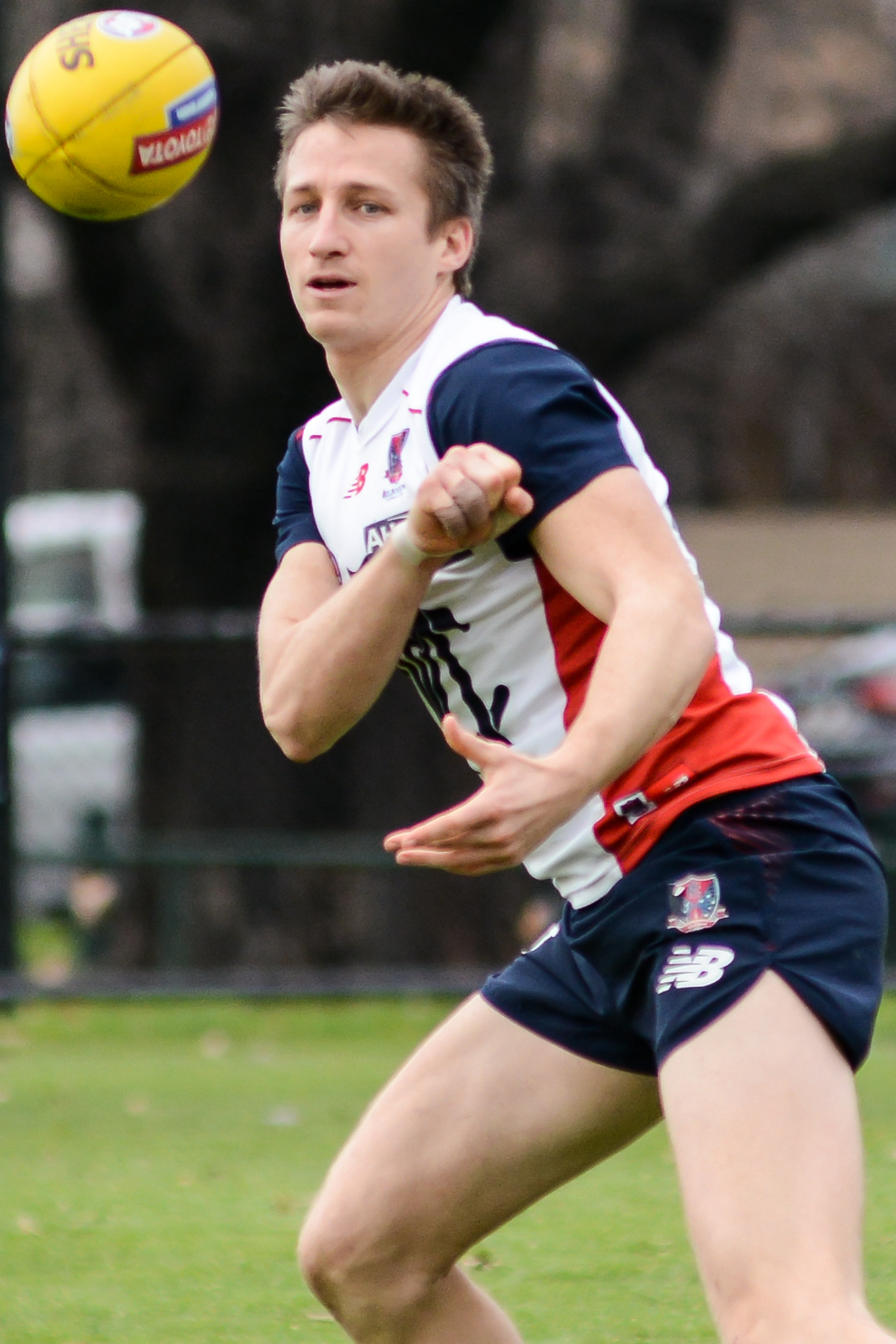
- Grimes at training during July 2015

Personal information
- Full name: Jack Grimes
- Nickname: Grimey
- Born: 11 May 1989 (age 37)
- Original team: Northern Knights (TAC Cup)
- Draft: No. 14, 2007 National Draft
- Debut: Round 22, 2008, Melbourne vs. Richmond, at Melbourne Cricket Ground
- Height: 187 cm (6 ft 2 in)
- Weight: 84 kg (185 lb)
- Position: Defender

Playing career^{1}
Years	Club	Games (Goals)
2008–2016	Melbourne	100 (11)
- ^{1} Playing statistics correct to the end of 2016.

Career highlights
- Melbourne co-captain: 2012–2014; AFL Rising Star nominee: 2009

Jack Grimes (born 11 May 1989) is a former professional Australian rules footballer who played for and is a former captain of the Melbourne Football Club in the Australian Football League (AFL).

He was named as an All-Australian at the 2007 NAB AFL U18 Championships. He was drafted by Melbourne in the 2007 National Draft at pick 14, but was placed on the long-term injury list due to stress-related back problems. He made his debut in the final game of the 2008 AFL season but suffered a further back injury in the early part of the 2009 season.

He returned in round 7 and played eleven games in 2009, including Round 14 against West Coast when he was awarded three Brownlow Medal votes and was nominated for the AFL Rising Star award.

Jack Grimes suffered a season-ending injury in the round 7 match against the Adelaide Crows.

On 3 February 2012 he was named, alongside fellow youngster Jack Trengove as the co-captain of Melbourne Football Club. At 22 years of age he was one of the youngest ever captains in VFL/AFL history. In 2014, Grimes continued on as co-captain, this time with Nathan Jones. However, on 1 December 2014 it was announced that he had stepped down as the club's co-captain.

Grimes was delisted at the conclusion of the 2016 season, during which he played his 100th and final AFL game.

For the 2017 season Grimes signed with the Hurstbridge Football Club in the Northern Football League.

== Statistics ==
Legend
G	Goals	K	Kicks	D	Disposals	T	Tackles
B	Behinds	H	Handballs	M	Marks

Season	Team	No.	Games	Totals							Averages (per game)						
Season	Team	No.	Games	G	B	K	H	D	M	T	G	B	K	H	D	M	T
2008	Melbourne	16	1	0	0	3	5	8	2	1	0.0	0.0	3.0	5.0	8.0	2.0	1.0
2009	Melbourne	16	11	2	1	134	92	226	94	24	0.2	0.1	12.2	8.4	20.6	8.5	2.2
2010	Melbourne	16	14	0	1	181	124	305	81	32	0.0	0.1	12.9	8.9	21.8	5.1	2.2
2011	Melbourne	16	6	1	1	68	46	114	32	11	0.2	0.2	11.3	7.7	19.0	5.3	1.8
2012	Melbourne	16	21	1	6	301	166	467	122	81	0.0	0.3	14.3	7.9	22.2	5.8	3.9
2013	Melbourne	31	15	1	3	150	124	274	69	63	0.1	0.2	10.0	8.3	18.3	4.6	4.2
2014	Melbourne	31	18	3	2	178	157	335	86	40	0.2	0.1	9.9	8.7	18.6	4.8	2.2
2015	Melbourne	31	12	3	3	133	105	238	70	29	0.3	0.3	11.1	8.8	19.9	5.8	2.4
2016	Melbourne	31	2	0	0	22	25	47	13	10	0.0	0.0	11.0	12.5	23.5	6.5	5.0
Career			100	11	17	1170	844	2014	569	294	0.1	0.2	11.7	8.4	20.1	5.7	2.9
