= Daniel Bell (footballer) =

Australian rules footballer

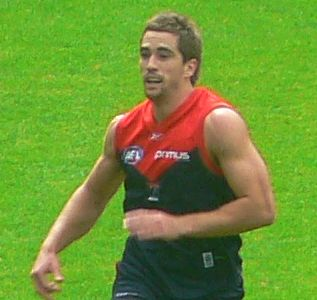

Personal information
- Born: 13 April 1985 (age 41)
- Original team: Glenelg (SANFL)
- Debut: Round 15, 11 July 2004, Melbourne vs. St Kilda, at MCG
- Height: 186 cm (6 ft 1 in)
- Weight: 89 kg (196 lb)

Playing career^{1}
Years	Club	Games (Goals)
2003–2009	Melbourne	66 (1)
- ^{1} Playing statistics correct to the end of 2009.

Daniel Bell (born 13 April 1985) is an Australian rules footballer who played for the Melbourne Football Club in the Australian Football League (AFL).

He was originally from the town of Kingston SE, South Australia.

He was drafted in the 2002 AFL draft in the first round, with the 14th overall selection from the Glenelg Tigers in the South Australian National Football League (SANFL). He made his debut in round 15, 2004 against the St Kilda Football Club. In 2005 he played 13 games, and in 2006 played 12 games, but was hampered by injury.

In 2007 he got a regular starting spot in the Melbourne side, playing 17 games and even scoring a goal against the Western Bulldogs in round 7. In round 20, against Collingwood, he was involved in an incident with Collingwood's Ben Johnson. With his head over the ball, Johnson crashed into the head of Bell, and Bell lay motionless on the ground before being stretchered off the field. Bell initially feared that he might have broken his back, and he couldn't breathe because of the impact. There were no hard feelings over the incident; however Johnson was suspended for six weeks for head high contact.

He did not play again after the incident in the 2007 season. Bell returned in 2008 to play 18 games and was mainly used as a half back flanker.

After playing only three games in 2009 and being unable to make it into the senior team in 2010, Bell was delisted at the end of the season.
