= Jack Trengove =

Australian rules footballer (born 1991)

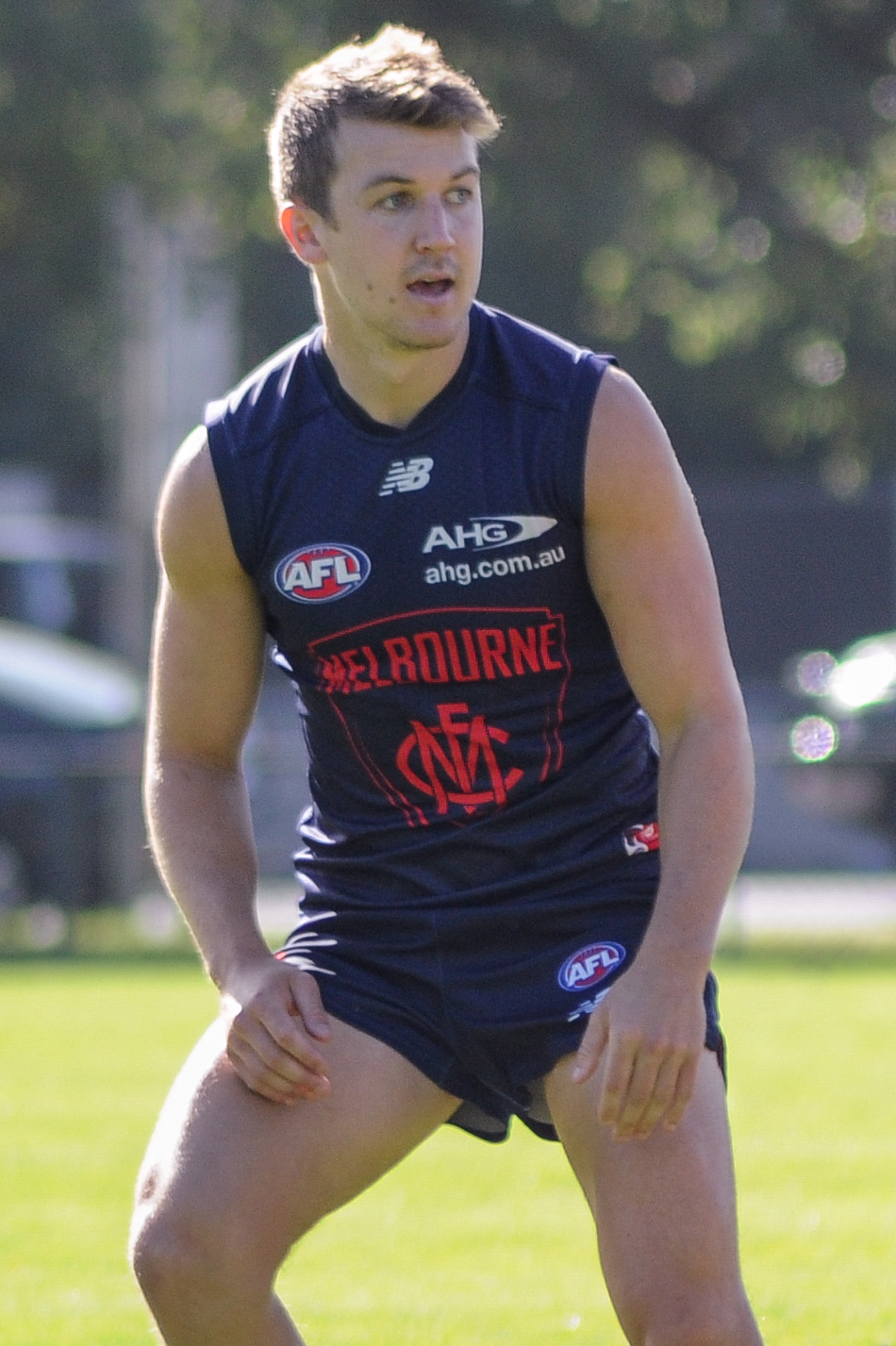
- Trengove training with Melbourne in March 2017

Personal information
- Full name: Jack Trengove
- Born: 2 September 1991 (age 35); Naracoorte, South Australia
- Original team: Sturt (SANFL)
- Draft: No. 2, 2009 national draft
- Debut: Round 1, 2010, Melbourne vs. Hawthorn, at MCG
- Height: 186 cm (6 ft 1 in)
- Weight: 88 kg (194 lb)
- Position: Midfielder

Playing career^{1}
| Years | Club | Games (Goals) |
| 2010–2017 | Melbourne | 86 (39) |
| 2018–2019 | Port Adelaide | 3 (0) |
| Total | | 89 (39) |

International team honours^{2}
| Years | Team | Games (Goals) |
| 2011 | Australia | 2 (0) |
- ^{1} Playing statistics correct to the end of 2019.^{2} Representative statistics correct as of 2011.

Career highlights
- Melbourne Co-Captain: 2012–2013; AFL Rising Star nominee: 2010; A.R. McLean Medal (2019)

Jack Trengove (born 2 September 1991) is a former professional Australian rules footballer who played for the Melbourne Football Club and the Port Adelaide Football Club in the Australian Football League (AFL). A midfielder, 1.86 metres (6 ft 1 in) tall and weighing 88 kilograms (194 lb), in his playing days Trengove was capable of contributing as both an inside and outside midfielder. After growing up in Naracoorte, South Australia, he moved to Adelaide to attend Prince Alfred College and played in the South Australian National Football League (SANFL) with the Sturt Football Club, in which he played in the 2009 SANFL Grand Final. He represented South Australia in the 2009 AFL Under 18 Championships, in which he captained the side, received All-Australian honours and won the state most valuable player. His achievements as a junior saw him considered as the potential number one draft pick in the 2009 AFL draft alongside Tom Scully, he was ultimately recruited by the Melbourne Football Club with the second selection in the draft.

Trengove made his AFL debut during the 2010 season and earned an AFL Rising Star nomination, in which he finished fourth overall. After his first two seasons in the AFL, where he represented Australia in the International Rules Series and finished in the top five of the club best and fairest, he was named the co-captain of the club alongside Jack Grimes in 2012. His first match as captain saw him become the youngest captain in VFL/AFL history; he retained the captaincy for two seasons before he relinquished the role at the end of the 2013 season to focus on his playing form. His next two seasons were hampered by a navicular bone injury, which saw him play just seven AFL matches from the start of the 2014 season to the end of the 2017 season. He was delisted by Melbourne at the end of the 2017 season before signing with Port Adelaide as a free agent during the 2017 trade period. He played for Prince Alfred OC in the Adelaide Footy League (SAAFL) and now currently plays at his former club the Kybybolite Tigers in the Kowree Naracoorte Tatiara Football League.

== Early life ==
Trengove was born and raised in Naracoorte, South Australia near the Victorian border in the south-east of South Australia. He played his junior football with the Kybybolite Football Club in the Kowree-Naracoorte-Tatiara Football League before moving to Adelaide to attend Prince Alfred College. He received mid-year honours in 2009 when he represented South Australia in the AFL Under 18 Championships, in addition to captaining the side. His performances in the championships saw him earn a spot in the All-Australian team as the ruck-rover and win the most valuable player for South Australia. While completing year twelve, he played in the South Australian National Football League (SANFL) with the Sturt Football Club; he played the second half of the season with the senior side, which included a best on ground performance in the preliminary final against Glenelg—where he took a match-saving mark in defence— and the grand final loss to Central District.

Speculation as to who would be the number one pick for the 2009 AFL draft was rife throughout the year, with either Tom Scully or Trengove predicted the most likely to be recruited with the first pick. After the Melbourne Football Club secured the first two selections in the draft, it was considered a foregone conclusion by the media that Scully and Trengove would be the first two picks, with both deserving to be the first pick.

== AFL career ==
=== 2010–2011: Early career ===
Trengove was recruited by the Melbourne Football Club with their second selection and the second overall in the 2009 national draft. He made his debut in the fifty-six-point loss against Hawthorn at the Melbourne Cricket Ground in the opening round of the 2009 season, in which he recorded twenty-three disposals, two marks and two tackles, and was named in the best players for Melbourne. In his fifth match, he received the round five nomination for the AFL Rising Star after he recorded twenty-four disposals, six marks, four tackles and two goals in the fifty point win against the Brisbane Lions at the Melbourne Cricket Ground. He played the first nine matches of the year before he was rested for the round ten match against Geelong at Skilled Stadium, with the previous week's match being played in hot conditions in Darwin. He missed three weeks of football in July with a hip injury. He returned from injury through the Victorian Football League (VFL) with Melbourne's affiliate team, the Casey Scorpions. He returned to the senior side in round nineteen for the twenty-nine-point win against Richmond at the Melbourne Cricket Ground and played the remainder of the year to finish with eighteen matches and average nineteen disposals a match. He was considered one of the early favourites to win the rising star in the betting markets, and ultimately finished fourth overall in the award.

Trengove played the first seven matches of the year in 2011 before he was suspended for three weeks after tackling then-Adelaide forward, Patrick Dangerfield, during the round seven match against Adelaide, in a case which sparked significant debate. He tackled Dangerfield around the waist, pinned one of his arms and slung him to the ground, causing Dangerfield's head to hit the ground and leaving him concussed. In its appeal, which was dismissed, the club argued that an attempt to kick the ball by Dangerfield had caused both players to fall awkwardly, rather than the collision with the ground being caused by a slinging action. Many players, commentators and coaches spoke out against the suspension, including several Melbourne teammates who were later fined for voicing their disapproval via Twitter. He returned in round eleven for the thirty-three-point win against Essendon at the Melbourne Cricket Ground and played the remainder of the year to finish with nineteen matches for the season and a fifth-place finish in Melbourne's best and fairest award. Throughout the year, teammate Tom Scully was linked to a move to incoming team, Greater Western Sydney, which created the debate of whether Trengove or Scully added move value to Melbourne, with Herald Sun journalist, Mark Stevens, noting Trengove had more worth due to his leadership qualities. In November, he represented Australia in the International Rules Series against Ireland.

=== 2012–2013: Captaincy ===
On the eve of the 2012 season, Trengove was announced as co-captain of Melbourne alongside Jack Grimes. The decision to appoint two young captains was questioned within the industry, however, two-time premiership player, David King, said the appointments of Grimes and Trengove was the correct decision. Playing in round one, Trengove became—at 20 years and 181 days old—the youngest club captain in VFL/AFL history. With a decline in Melbourne's success came a stall in his form, whereby he averaged less disposals per game than in either of his first two seasons, despite playing all twenty-two games for the first time in his career. He finished eighth in Melbourne's best and fairest count.

Trengove's 2013 pre-season was hampered by a navicular bone stress fracture, which forced him into a moon boot for six weeks and miss twelve weeks of training. Along with Jack Grimes, he was retained as co-captain for the 2013 season. A reduction in fitness due to the foot injury and Melbourne having one of its poorest seasons in history saw Trengove's form drop. Questions were raised over how much of an impact captaining Melbourne's dismal season was having on him and whether his form would improve if he relinquished the captaincy. In November, he stepped down as captain, citing the need to focus on his playing form. After the revelations of the Essendon Football Club supplements saga and sport scientist Stephen Dank's involvement, Trengove was linked to Dank after texts between Dank and Melbourne's doctor surfaced in April regarding treatment of his foot. He was cleared by the Australian Sports Anti-Doping Authority over a year later in June 2014. He missed two matches during the year, the round one match against Port Adelaide at the Melbourne Cricket Ground and the round seven match against Gold Coast at the Melbourne Cricket Ground due to a calf injury, to finish with twenty matches during the year.

=== 2014–2017: Foot injury and comeback ===
After playing the first two rounds of the 2014 season, Trengove missed the remainder of the season due to problems and a break in his navicular bone. During the trade period, the Herald Sun reported that he was linked to Richmond in exchange for pick twelve in the 2014 national draft. He was reluctant to the trade and expressed his desire to stay at Melbourne, but stated that he would not block the move if it was fulfilled. The trade was set to be finalised, but a medical report was requested by Richmond, where it was discovered that he had reinjured his navicular bone, and the trade was ruled out. There was uncertainty surrounding his 2015 season and whether he could make a return, before he confirmed to Melbourne radio station, Triple M, in April 2015 that he was not going to play at all in 2015 and would instead focus on 2016.

After not playing a match for nearly two years, Trengove played his first football match in March 2016 when he featured in an intraclub match and played his first competitive match in the round one VFL match against Frankston in April. After strong form in the VFL, he made his long-awaited return to AFL football in the eighteen point loss against Hawthorn at the Melbourne Cricket Ground in round eleven, in which he recorded nineteen disposals and four clearances. He played the next two matches before he was omitted for the first match after the mid-season bye, the round fifteen match against Adelaide at the Melbourne Cricket Ground. He did not play another AFL match for the year, and instead played in the VFL, helping Casey claim the minor premiership and reach their first grand final since 1999, in which the club ultimately lost to Footscray by thirty-one points.

Trengove played in the VFL for a large part of the 2017 season and despite being in "blistering form" according to the Herald Sun's Toby Prime, he couldn't find his way into the senior side for a majority of the season. He was promoted to the senior side for the round eighteen match against Port Adelaide at the Melbourne Cricket Ground and his return was labelled as one of the AFL's "feel-good stories" by The Age journalist, Jon Pierik. In the twenty-three-point win, he recorded sixteen disposals, four tackles and three marks. He played the next week before he was omitted for the round twenty match against Greater Western Sydney. He played just the two AFL matches for the season, but averaged twenty-three disposals across eighteen matches in the VFL and won Gardner-Clark Medal as Casey's best and fairest player. At the end of the season, he was delisted by Melbourne after playing eighty-six matches in eight seasons. He played seventy-nine matches out of a possible eighty-eight in his first four seasons, but could only manage seven in his final four years at the club due to his foot injury, in addition to former coach, Paul Roos, stating the call to make him captain at twenty years of age stalled his development and was a "poor decision". Seven weeks after being delisted, he signed with Port Adelaide as a delisted free agent.

== Personal life ==
Trengove's older sister, Jessica Trengove, is a runner who won a gold medal for Australia in the 2022 Commonwealth Games in Birmingham. She represented Australia in the marathon at the 2012 London Olympics and 2016 Rio Olympics. He has another sister, Abbie, who represented their state in rowing.

== Statistics ==
Statistics are correct to the end of the 2017 season

Legend
| G | Goals | K | Kicks | D | Disposals | T | Tackles |
| B | Behinds | H | Handballs | M | Marks |

| Season | Team | No. | Games | Totals | | | | | | | Averages (per game) | | | | | | |
| Season | Team | No. | Games | G | B | K | H | D | M | T | G | B | K | H | D | M | T |
|---|---|---|---|---|---|---|---|---|---|---|---|---|---|---|---|---|---|
| 2010 | Melbourne | 9 | 18 | 8 | 11 | 156 | 187 | 343 | 63 | 75 | 0.4 | 0.6 | 8.8 | 10.4 | 19.1 | 3.5 | 4.2 |
| 2011 | Melbourne | 9 | 19 | 13 | 11 | 204 | 183 | 387 | 92 | 100 | 0.7 | 0.6 | 10.7 | 9.6 | 20.4 | 4.8 | 5.3 |
| 2012 | Melbourne | 9 | 22 | 8 | 8 | 199 | 190 | 389 | 88 | 99 | 0.4 | 0.4 | 9.1 | 8.6 | 17.7 | 4.0 | 4.5 |
| 2013 | Melbourne | 9 | 20 | 9 | 5 | 190 | 167 | 357 | 86 | 94 | 0.5 | 0.3 | 9.5 | 8.4 | 17.9 | 4.3 | 4.7 |
| 2014 | Melbourne | 9 | 2 | 0 | 1 | 23 | 21 | 44 | 10 | 4 | 0.0 | 0.5 | 11.5 | 10.5 | 22.0 | 5.0 | 2.0 |
| 2015 | Melbourne | 9 | 0 | — | — | — | — | — | — | — | — | — | — | — | — | — | — |
| 2016 | Melbourne | 9 | 3 | 1 | 0 | 21 | 30 | 51 | 6 | 16 | 0.3 | 0.0 | 7.0 | 10.0 | 17.0 | 2.0 | 5.3 |
| 2017 | Melbourne | 9 | 2 | 0 | 0 | 17 | 12 | 29 | 4 | 4 | 0.0 | 0.0 | 8.5 | 6.0 | 14.5 | 2.0 | 2.0 |
| Career | | | 86 | 39 | 36 | 810 | 790 | 1600 | 349 | 392 | 0.5 | 0.4 | 9.4 | 9.2 | 18.6 | 4.1 | 4.6 |
