= Brad Green (footballer) =

Australian rules footballer (born 1981)

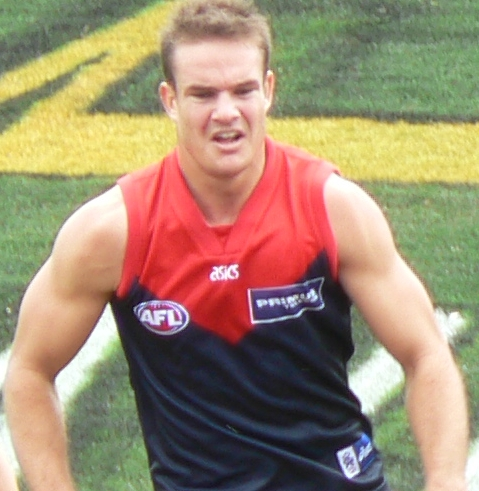
- Green playing for Melbourne in 2007

Personal information
- Full name: Brad Green
- Born: 13 March 1981 (age 45); George Town, Tasmania
- Original team: Tassie Mariners
- Draft: No. 19, 1999 National Draft
- Height: 184 cm (6 ft 0 in)
- Weight: 83 kg (13 st 1 lb; 183 lb)
- Position: Forward

Playing career^{1}
Years	Club	Games (Goals)
2000–2012	Melbourne	254 (350)

International team honours^{2}
Years	Team	Games (Goals)
2004–2011	Australia	6 (1)
- ^{1} Playing statistics correct to the end of 2012.^{2} Representative statistics correct as of 2011.

Career highlights
- Melbourne leading goalkicker: 2010; Keith 'Bluey' Truscott Medal list: 2010; Melbourne captain: 2011; Australian international rules captain: 2011

Brad Green (born 13 March 1981) is a former Australian rules football player and current executive. He played for 13 seasons with the Melbourne Football Club in the Australian Football League (AFL). Drafted with the 19th selection in the 1999 AFL draft, Green played in a losing Grand Final in his first season. In 2010 he won the club's best and fairest award and was the club's leading goalkicker, with many commentators stating he was unlucky to miss out on All-Australian selection. Green was named Melbourne's captain for the next season, but the appointment was short-lived as he held the position for only one year. He also represented the Australian International rules football team in 2004, 2010 and 2011, captaining the side in 2011.

Green was an assistant coach at the Carlton Football Club from 2013 to 2015. He then served as an assistant at North Melbourne through 2017.

On 6 September 2024, Green became President of the Melbourne Football Club. At the end of the 2025 AFL season, Green stepped down as president and shifted to the role of Vice President of Melbourne Football Club.

== Early life ==
Green was born in Georgetown, Tasmania. A natural sportsman, Green played representative cricket and soccer as a teenager and captained the Australian under-15 cricket team. Green is an alumnus from Victoria University.

== Soccer career ==
While still a teenager, Green was selected for the senior soccer side at Launceston United SC in the Tasmanian soccer championship. Green attended the Launceston Church Grammar School in Tasmania, and later Victoria University and La Trobe University. During his early soccer-playing days as a teenager, he was scouted by Manchester United. After spending a month at on trial with the club, the 15-year-old Green trained with Walsall, a lower division English club, and was offered a contract but turned it down, choosing to finish his schooling in Tasmania.

Green remains a soccer fan and supporter of Melbourne Victory.

== Switch to Australian rules ==
Green only began playing Australian rules seriously in his mid-teens – after returning from England – but his talent was obvious. Green decided to focus his sporting attention on the local game playing for the Tassie Mariners and North Launceston. He was subsequently drafted to Melbourne in the 1999 AFL draft.

== AFL career ==
Green made his AFL debut in 2000. Melbourne had a highly successful year in 2000 and in his first year of AFL football Green played an important role in the Melbourne forward line. Melbourne made the Grand Final, but were ultimately unsuccessful, losing to Essendon.

After working his way into a greater role in the midfield in 2004, Green found plenty of the ball both forward and through the midfield in 2005. His penetrating and very accurate left foot kicking was effective to leading forwards or in front of goals. He often sets up Melbourne's marking forwards. He played in 21 of a possible 23 games in 2005, consolidating himself as an integral part of the Demons outfit in 2006 with consistent displays in the midfield and excelling as part of the leadership group. Green wore the number 18 guernsey for Melbourne.

Described, as a "soft" player early in his career, Green became renowned for his acts of courage mid-career, attacking the football with vigour and courage. This resulted in him taking a higher number of contested marks in 2007. In the 2007 season, he played very good football both in defence, the midfield, and in the forward line. Green continued his solid form into the 2008 season, being one of Melbourne's few highlights in a miserable season. It took time for Green to decide if he wanted to go on and play with the Demons in 2009 but eventually signed a contract and agreeing to stay red and blue for another three years.

In 2010, Green had his best season to date, kicking 55 goals and taking 153 marks, both ranked sixth in the AFL, in a young Melbourne side to make the All-Australian squad and win his first Keith 'Bluey' Truscott Medal. Green finished on 295 votes to win the award from James Frawley (277) and Mark Jamar (231). He also won the Ron Barrassi Leadership Award and the "Heart and Soul" Award, pushing his case to be the next captain of the Demons, after the retirement of James McDonald.

Green was named the new Melbourne captain in January 2011, succeeding James McDonald, who retired at the end of 2010. He described being named captain as a "surreal experience". He was also named captain of the Australia international rules football team for the 2011 Series in Australia, and was the only Australian to kick a goal during the 2011 International Rules Series; many commentators named this goal a "captain's goal".

Before the 2012 season, under new coach Mark Neeld, Green was removed from the captaincy and the leadership group altogether in favour of a new and younger group of whom only two were retained from the previous year.

Green played his 250th AFL game in Round 18 against North Melbourne, coincidentally the same team against whom he made his AFL debut back in 2000. On 8 August 2012, Green announced that he would retire at the conclusion of the 2012 season. He was the last remaining player from the club's 2000 Grand Final side to retire.

== Statistics ==
Legend
G	Goals	K	Kicks	D	Disposals	T	Tackles
B	Behinds	H	Handballs	M	Marks

Season	Team	No.	Games	Totals							Averages (per game)						
Season	Team	No.	Games	G	B	K	H	D	M	T	G	B	K	H	D	M	T
2000	Melbourne	18	20	28	9	104	32	136	50	18	1.4	0.5	5.2	1.6	6.8	2.5	0.9
2001	Melbourne	18	21	37	15	103	52	155	53	25	1.8	0.7	4.9	2.5	7.4	2.5	1.2
2002	Melbourne	18	21	29	23	164	66	230	85	27	1.4	1.1	7.8	3.1	11.0	4.0	1.3
2003	Melbourne	18	21	35	19	201	102	303	93	46	1.7	0.9	9.6	4.9	14.4	4.4	2.2
2004	Melbourne	18	21	26	10	270	151	421	106	41	1.2	0.5	12.9	7.2	20.0	5.0	2.0
2005	Melbourne	18	21	28	14	224	145	369	127	54	1.3	0.7	10.7	6.9	17.6	6.0	2.6
2006	Melbourne	18	23	11	17	308	191	499	159	60	0.5	0.7	13.4	8.3	21.7	6.9	2.6
2007	Melbourne	18	18	13	8	220	164	384	117	49	0.7	0.4	12.2	9.1	21.3	6.5	2.7
2008	Melbourne	18	20	20	13	271	186	457	140	60	1.0	0.7	13.6	9.3	22.9	7.0	3.0
2009	Melbourne	18	12	12	3	152	109	261	73	20	1.0	0.3	12.7	9.1	21.8	6.1	1.7
2010	Melbourne	18	22	55	27	295	129	424	153	58	2.5	1.2	13.4	5.9	19.3	7.0	2.6
2011	Melbourne	18	21	37	25	205	128	333	106	61	1.8	1.2	9.8	6.1	15.9	5.0	2.9
2012	Melbourne	18	13	19	18	96	39	135	55	29	1.5	1.4	7.4	3.0	10.4	4.2	2.2
Career			254	350	201	2613	1494	4107	1317	548	1.4	0.8	10.3	5.9	16.2	5.2	2.2

== Honours and achievements ==
Brownlow Medal votes
Season	Votes
2000	0
2001	0
2002	2
2003	0
2004	5
2005	0
2006	3
2007	3
2008	3
2009	0
2010	6
2011	1
2012	0
Total	23

- Individual
  - Keith 'Bluey' Truscott Medal: 2010
  - Melbourne F.C. Captain: 2011
  - Melbourne F.C. Leading Goalkicker: 2010 (55 Goals)
  - Australian Representative Honours in International Rules Football: 2004, 2010, 2011 (Captain)
  - AFL Rising Star Nominee: 2000 (Round 19)

== Coaching career ==
On 5 November 2012, Carlton Football Club announced that Green had been appointed as a development coach under Mick Malthouse. After three years at Carlton, Green joined the North Melbourne Football Club as their defensive coach.

== Sports administration career ==
On 6 September 2024, Green became President of the Melbourne Football Club. At the conclusion of the 2025 AFL season, Green stepped down as President of Melbourne Football Club and shifted to the role of Vice President of Melbourne Football Club, with Steven Smith replacing Green as President.

== Personal life ==
Green is a supporter of A-League Men soccer club Melbourne Victory.

Green's wife, Anna, died on 27 May 2019. The couple have two sons.
