= List of Melbourne Football Club captains =

This is a list of all captains of the Melbourne Football Club, an Australian rules football club in the Australian Football League (AFL) and AFL Women's.

== VFL/AFL ==
Dates	Captain(s)
1897–1898	Ned Sutton
1899	Eddie Sholl
1900	Dick Wardill
1901–1904	William C. McClelland
1905	Frank Langley
1906	Arthur Sowden
1907	Vin Coutie
1908	Hugh Purse
1909	Bernie Nolan
1910–1911	Vin Coutie
1912–1913	Alf George
1914	Len Incigneri
1915	Jack McKenzie
1919–1920	George Heinz
1921–1923	Percy Wilson
1924–1927	Albert Chadwick
1928–1931	Ivor Warne-Smith
1932–1933	Francis Vine
1934–1935	Colin Niven
1936–1941	Allan La Fontaine
1942–1944	Percy Beames
1945–1947	Norm Smith
1948–1949	Don Cordner
1950	Shane McGrath
1951–1953	Denis Cordner
1954	Geoff Collins
1955–1956	Noel McMahen
1957–1959	John Beckwith
1960–1964	Ron Barassi
1965–1969	Hassa Mann
1970	Robert Johnson
1971–1972	Frank Davis
1973–1976	Stan Alves
1977–1978	Greg Wells
1979–1980	Carl Ditterich
1981–1987	Robert Flower
1988–1990	Greg Healy
1991–1997	Garry Lyon
1998–1999	Todd Viney
2000–2008	David Neitz
2009–2010	James McDonald
2011	Brad Green
2012–2013	Jack Trengove/Jack Grimes
2014	Nathan Jones/Jack Grimes
2015–2016	Nathan Jones
2017–2019	Nathan Jones/Jack Viney
2020–	Max Gawn

== AFL Women's ==
Dates	Captain(s)
2017–2018	Daisy Pearce
2019	Elise O'Dea/Shelley Scott
2020–S7 (2022)	Daisy Pearce
2023–	Kate Hore
