= Mark Jamar =

Australian rules footballer

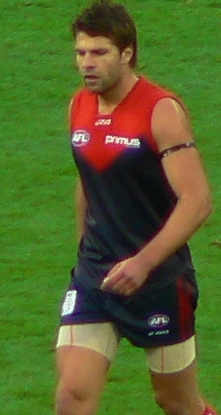
- Jamar playing for Melbourne in 2007

Personal information
- Full name: Mark Jamar
- Nickname: The Russian
- Born: 9 August 1983 (age 43); Port Pirie, South Australia
- Original team: North Adelaide Football Club
- Draft: No. 6, 2002 Rookie Draft
- Debut: Round 1, 2003, Melbourne vs. Hawthorn, at MCG
- Height: 198 cm (6 ft 6 in)
- Weight: 101 kg (223 lb)
- Position: Ruckman

Playing career^{1}
Years	Club	Games (Goals)
2002–2015	Melbourne	155 (56)
2016	Essendon	5 (3)
Total		160 (59)
- ^{1} Playing statistics correct to the end of 2016.

Career highlights
- All-Australian team 2010

Mark Jamar (born 9 August 1983) is a former professional Australian rules footballer who played for the Melbourne Football Club and Essendon Football Club in the Australian Football League (AFL).

== Early life ==
Jamar was born and raised in the country South Australian town of Port Pirie. He played his early football at the Lions Football Club of the Spencer Gulf Football League, before moving to North Adelaide in the South Australian National Football League (SANFL).

Jamar was a standout performer at the 2001 AFL Under 18 Championships being selected in the All Australian team. However, he was overlooked in that year's draft. He was, however, selected at pick six of the rookie draft by Melbourne.

== AFL career ==
Jamar was drafted at pick number six to Melbourne in the 2001 Rookie Draft. He debuted in the opening round of the 2003 season against Hawthorn, which the Demons won by six points. He had a quiet debut with only four disposals, a mark and a hit-out on the stats sheet. However he improved in his next match, a 27-point win over Port Adelaide in which he registered six disposals, 10 hit-outs and his first AFL goal. He went on to play another seven games that season, all of which Melbourne lost. They finished 14th and did not play in the finals. Jamar ranked fourth among rising stars in total hit-outs in 2003 and third among rising stars in hit-outs per game in 2003.

Jamar only played three games in 2004, including an elimination final that the Demons lost in a five-point match against Essendon. He averaged five disposals and seven hit-outs.

In 2005, Jamar played eight games - of which the Demons won five. He averaged only three disposals and eight hit-outs and kicked one goal in the ruck. Melbourne finished seventh and played in the elimination final against Geelong, which they lost by 55 points.

Jamar missed only one game in the whole 2006 season. He consolidated himself as a reliable ruckman for the Demons. He averaged 10 hit-outs and four disposals and kicked 10 goals and two behinds for the season. Melbourne finished the season seventh and played St Kilda in the elimination final, which the Demons won by 18 points. Jamar contributed in the ruck with seven hit-outs and four disposals. He did not play against Fremantle the following week when the Demons were defeated by 28 points and were eliminated from the finals.

In 2007, Jamar missed the middle part of the season, but played the first and last five games of the season. He only played in two winning matches and averaged 6 disposals and 10 hit-outs as well as kicking four goals for the season. The Demons finished 14th.

In 2008, Jamar played 14 games and averaged eight disposals and 19 hit-outs and kicked four goals. Though Melbourne finished last and did not qualify for finals, Jamar had made himself known in the AFL, performing reliably in the ruck. He ranked ninth in hit-outs per game for 2008.

A stress fracture in his foot resulted in Jamar missing much of the 2009 season. In the games he did play he played in the primary ruck position, averaging 23 hit-outs and 11 disposals. Once again the Demons finished bottom of the ladder, but Jamar's efforts as Melbourne's main big man did not go unnoticed. He was ranked seventh in hit-outs per game for the year.

Jamar went from strength to strength as Melbourne's number one ruck in 2010, playing an instrumental part in the Demons' rise up the ladder, averaging 29 hit-outs, 12 disposals and three contested marks per game, with four goals over the first seven rounds. He was ranked second in the AFL for hit-outs per game, was named as the second ruckman for the 2010 All-Australian squad and finished third in Melbourne's Best and Fairest, behind Brad Green and James Frawley.

He was informed in September 2015 that he would not be offered a contract from Melbourne for 2016, effectively ending his fourteen-year career with the club after 155 games. In December 2015, Jamar announced that he had signed to play with St Kevin's Old Boys in premier division of the Victorian Amateur Football Association (VAFA) for season 2016.

In February 2016, Jamar signed with the Essendon Football Club as a top-up player due to the supplements controversy which saw 34 past and present players suspended for the season.

== Statistics ==
Legend
G	Goals	K	Kicks	D	Disposals	T	Tackles
B	Behinds	H	Handballs	M	Marks	H/O	Hit-outs

Season	Team	No.	Games	Totals								Averages (per game)							
Season	Team	No.	Games	G	B	K	H	D	M	T	H/O	G	B	K	H	D	M	T	H/O
2002	Melbourne	40	0	—	—	—	—	—	—	—	—	—	—	—	—	—	—	—	—
2003	Melbourne	40	9	2	1	20	34	54	9	7	102	0.2	0.1	2.2	3.8	6.0	1.0	0.8	11.3
2004	Melbourne	40	3	0	0	4	10	14	7	1	22	0.0	0.0	1.3	3.3	4.7	2.3	0.3	7.3
2005	Melbourne	40	8	1	0	8	19	27	6	9	60	0.1	0.0	1.0	2.4	3.4	0.8	1.1	7.5
2006	Melbourne	40	22	10	2	37	59	96	51	24	225	0.5	0.1	1.7	2.7	4.4	2.3	1.1	10.2
2007	Melbourne	40	10	4	3	24	38	62	23	25	97	0.4	0.3	2.4	3.8	6.2	2.3	2.5	9.7
2008	Melbourne	40	14	4	2	24	91	115	32	50	261	0.3	0.1	1.7	6.5	8.2	2.3	3.6	18.6
2009	Melbourne	40	7	7	2	24	55	79	28	14	159	1.0	0.3	3.4	7.9	11.3	4.0	2.0	22.7
2010	Melbourne	40	22	12	4	66	207	273	69	39	643	0.5	0.2	3.0	9.4	12.4	3.1	1.8	29.2
2011	Melbourne	40	15	4	6	60	107	167	30	30	484	0.3	0.4	4.0	7.1	11.1	2.0	2.0	32.3
2012	Melbourne	40	14	1	4	54	62	116	30	23	453	0.1	0.3	3.9	4.4	8.3	2.1	1.6	32.4
2013	Melbourne	40	9	2	0	26	47	73	21	28	298	0.2	0.0	2.9	5.2	8.1	2.3	3.1	33.1
2014	Melbourne	40	17	7	5	76	78	154	31	41	540	0.4	0.3	4.5	4.6	9.1	1.8	2.4	31.8
2015	Melbourne	40	5	2	2	22	17	39	8	18	150	0.4	0.4	4.4	3.4	7.8	1.6	3.6	30.0
2016	Essendon	53	5	3	3	17	23	40	21	5	71	0.6	0.6	3.4	4.6	8.0	4.2	1.0	14.2
Career			160	59	34	462	847	1309	366	314	3565	0.4	0.2	2.9	5.3	8.2	2.3	2.0	22.3
