= James Strauss (footballer) =

Australian rules footballer (born 1990)

Personal information
- Full name: James Allan Strauss
- Born: 14 June 1990 (age 36)
- Original team: Oakleigh Chargers
- Draft: 1. 19, 2008 National Draft
- Debut: Round 1, 2010, Melbourne vs. Hawthorn, at MCG, Melbourne
- Height: 185 cm (6 ft 1 in)
- Weight: 82 kg (181 lb)
- Position: Midfielder

Playing career^{1}
Years	Club	Games (Goals)
2009–2014	Melbourne	24 (1)
- ^{1} Playing statistics correct to the end of 2014.

James Allan Strauss (born 14 June 1990) is an Australian rules footballer who played for the Melbourne Football Club in the Australian Football League.

Strauss was selected with Melbourne's third pick of the 2008 AFL draft, 19th overall from the Oakleigh Chargers.

== Junior career ==
Strauss's junior career was spent playing for the Oakleigh Chargers in the TAC Cup and for Scotch College in the Associated Public Schools in Victoria.

== AFL career ==
=== 2009: Recurring injuries ===
Strauss had a frustrating season with injuries in 2009. Ankle and leg problems hampered him early in the year and he ultimately injured his shoulder playing for Melbourne's VFL-affiliate, the Casey Scorpions. Strauss required a shoulder reconstruction, forcing him to miss the last eight weeks of the season.

=== 2010: Debut ===
Strauss improved his physical frame and worked hard to return to full fitness in the pre-season of the 2010 season to ensure he was pushing for senior selection. This work saw Strauss seen as a good chance to debut in round 1 against Hawthorn Football Club. Strauss's first official game for Melbourne did indeed occur in round 1 of the 2010 season against the Hawthorn at the MCG. However this match was a devastating loss for the Demons. Strauss played in Melbourne's second game of the season against Collingwood, however he was then dropped to Melbourne's VFL-affiliate team Casey, due to poor form.

=== 2011–2014 ===
In Melbourne's round 20, 2011 match against Carlton, Strauss suffered a sickening leg injury where it was broken in both his tibia and fibula during a marking contest against Carlton's Jeff Garlett. Although replays showed that there was minimal contact between him and Garlett as he fell awkwardly, the MCG crowd were shocked at what they saw. Commentators noted that it was just as sickening as the recent broken leg suffered by Fremantle's Michael Barlow the previous season and the broken snap suffered by Richmond's Nathan Brown way back in 2005, and during Network Ten's coverage of the match their commentators warned their viewers that "if you're a bit queasy, look away now".

Two years later, in the Demons' 13-point loss to Gold Coast at Metricon Stadium Strauss copped a boot to the face by Suns defender Campbell Brown; for this incident, Brown was suspended for four weeks, and was later sacked by the club following an off-season incident in the United States.

Strauss was delisted at the conclusion of the 2014 AFL season after struggling to break into the senior side.

== Post-AFL career ==
After being delisted by the Demons, Strauss was hopeful of getting another opportunity with a different AFL club. However, he was unsuccessful in this goal and ultimately joined Old Scotch in the Victorian Amateur Football Association for the 2015 season. In 2016, Strauss signed for VAFA Premier division club St Kevin's Old Boys, linking up with former Demons teammates Rohan Bail and Jordan Gysberts.

== Statistics ==
Statistics are correct to the end of the 2014 season

Legend
G	Goals	K	Kicks	D	Disposals	T	Tackles
B	Behinds	H	Handballs	M	Marks

Season	Team	No.	Games	Totals							Averages (per game)						
Season	Team	No.	Games	G	B	K	H	D	M	T	G	B	K	H	D	M	T
2009	Melbourne	19	0	—	—	—	—	—	—	—	—	—	—	—	—	—	—
2010	Melbourne	47	2	0	0	9	7	16	6	4	0.0	0.0	4.5	3.5	8	3	2
2011	Melbourne	47	9	0	0	67	49	116	18	26	0.0	0.0	7.4	2.1	12.9	2	2.9
2012	Melbourne	19	7	0	1	30	47	77	14	19	0.0	0.1	4.3	6.7	11	2	2.7
2013	Melbourne	19	6	1	0	37	21	58	17	11	0.2	0.0	6.2	3.5	9.7	2.8	1.8
2014	Melbourne	19	0	—	—	—	—	—	—	—	—	—	—	—	—	—	—
Career			24	1	1	143	124	267	55	60	0	0	6	5.2	11.2	2.3	2.5
