= Tom Scully =

Australian rules footballer

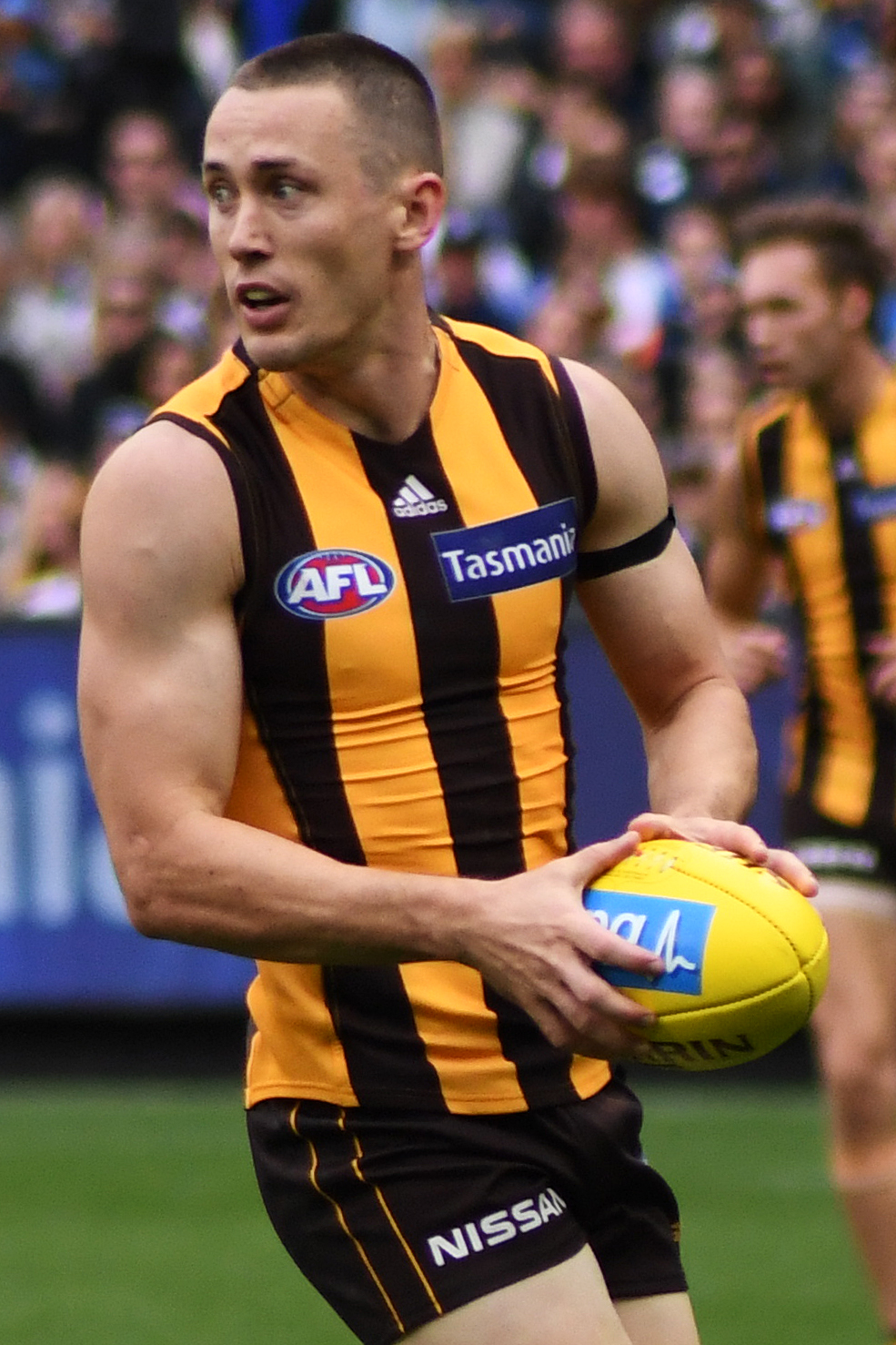
- Scully playing for Hawthorn in April 2019

Personal information
- Full name: Thomas Scully
- Born: 15 May 1991 (age 35); Berwick, Victoria
- Original team: Dandenong Stingrays
- Draft: No. 1, 2009 National Draft
- Debut: Round 1, 2010, Melbourne vs. Hawthorn, at Melbourne Cricket Ground
- Height: 181 cm (5 ft 11 in)
- Weight: 78 kg (172 lb)
- Position: Midfielder

Playing career^{1}
| Years | Club | Games (Goals) |
| 2010–2011 | Melbourne | 31 (6) |
| 2012–2018 | Greater Western Sydney | 121 (67) |
| 2019–2020 | Hawthorn | 35 (16) |
| Total | | 187 (89) |
- ^{1} Playing statistics correct to the end of 2020.

Career highlights
- Harold Ball Memorial Trophy: 2010; AFL Rising Star nominee: 2010

Tom Scully (born 15 May 1991) is a former professional Australian rules footballer. He played for the Melbourne Football Club, Greater Western Sydney Giants, and Hawthorn Football Club. A star midfielder at junior level, Scully was originally selected by Melbourne with the first overall draft pick of the 2009 AFL draft. However at the conclusion of his initial two-year contract with Melbourne, he accepted the opportunity to join the newly established GWS Giants in 2012 on a six-year deal. In October 2018, Scully was traded to Hawthorn for the 2019 season.

He attended school first at Berwick College and then Haileybury College.

== Junior career ==
Originally from Berwick, Scully was first noticed by Dandenong region manager Darren Flanigan when he was 13. Flanigan asserted that Scully was the best talent he had seen come through the Dandenong program in nine years. Scully played his TAC Cup football for the Dandenong Stingrays, and school football for Haileybury College. He captained Victorian Metropolitan region in the 2009 AFL Under 18 Championships and was named in the Under 18 All Australian team in 2008 and 2009.

== Melbourne career ==
=== Recruitment ===
Throughout 2009, Scully was touted as a potential and likely number one draft pick for the AFL draft. In the draft, the Melbourne Football Club had both the No. 1 and 2 picks available to it, and used the No. 1 pick (a priority draft pick) to recruit Scully. Scully was presented with the number 31 guernsey made famous by club and league legend Ron Barassi.

=== Playing career at Melbourne ===
Scully made his AFL debut in round 1, 2010, alongside No. 2 pick Jack Trengove. His breakout individual performance of the season came in Round 4 against Richmond, with 26 disposals for the match including 11 in the third quarter, and he received an AFL Rising Star nomination (and three Brownlow votes) for his Round 7 performance. Scully finished the season by coming second in the AFL Rising Star, behind Sydney's Dan Hannebery. He won the Harold Ball Memorial Trophy, for being Melbourne's Best First Year Player, and finished eighth in the Best and Fairest.

== Greater Western Sydney career ==
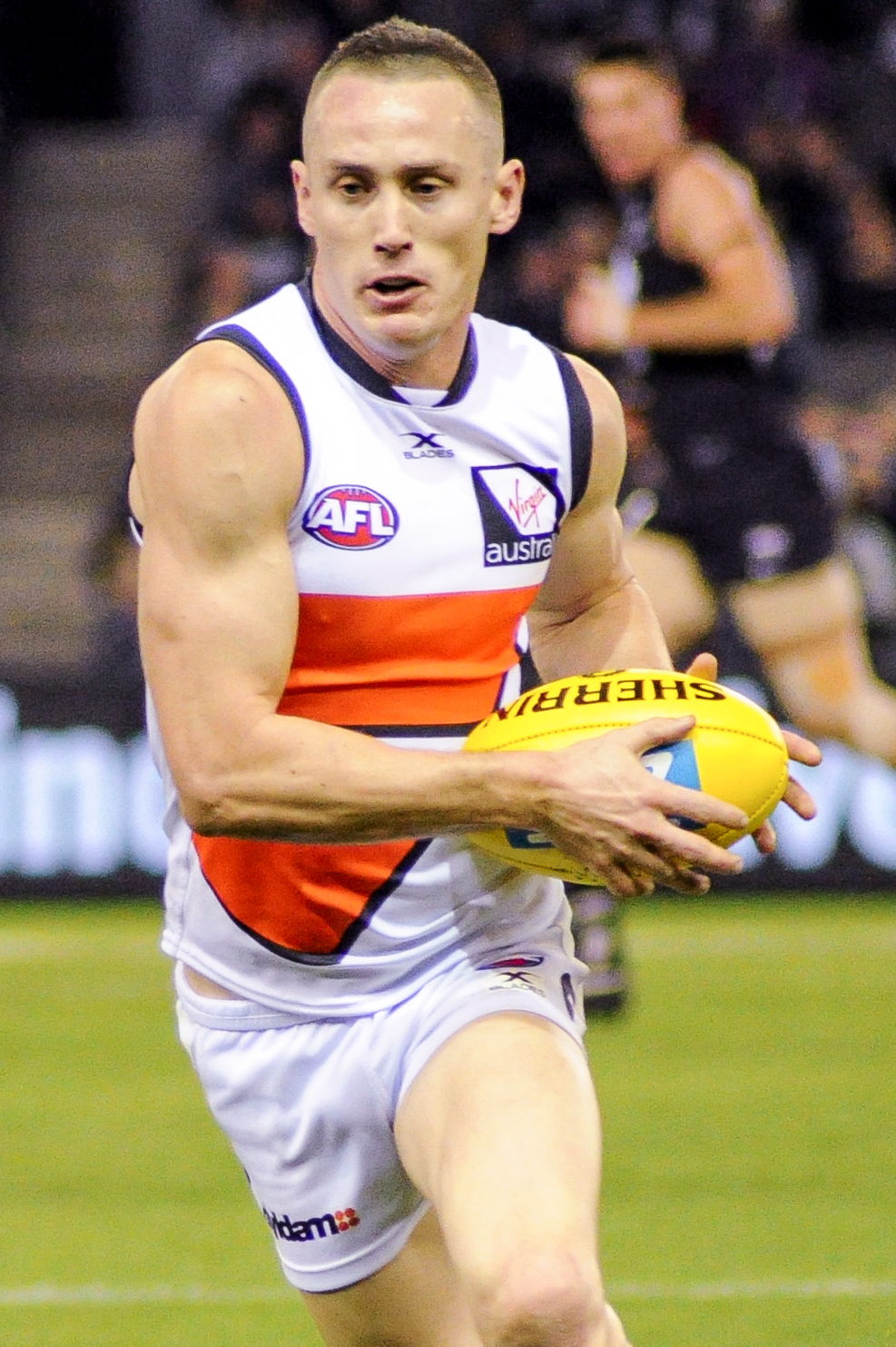
Scully playing for Greater Western Sydney in June 2017

=== Recruitment ===
There was intense speculation throughout the 2011 AFL season that Scully would move to expansion club Greater Western Sydney at the end of the season. Scully's initial two-year contract with Melbourne would end after the 2011 season, allowing the expansion club to sign Scully without need for a trade. It was announced on 12 September 2011 that he would be moving to the play for the Giants on a six-year contract valued at an estimated total value of $6 million.

Melbourne retrieved compensation picks for losing Scully, they traded for Dominic Barry and selected Jesse Hogan.

There was controversy surrounding the signing when it was discovered that Scully's father, Phil Scully, had also been offered a job as a recruiting scout at the Giants, with a six-year term of employment coinciding with the period of Scully's playing contract. The AFL ruled that the appointment was legal, but that it was considered as part of the total agreement used to convince Scully to sign with the Giants; as a result, Phil Scully's wages ($680,000 over six years) will be included inside Greater Western Sydney's salary cap. Scully has stated publicly that he had no knowledge of the offer to his father prior to signing his own deal. Phil Scully had previously served in a similar role with the Sydney Swans.

=== 2016 ===
After signing a four-year extension with the club midway through the 2016 season, Scully helped the new franchise finish fourth on the ladder and reach its first finals series in its short history.

=== 2017 ===
Known as "The Running Machine,” Scully received a second straight All-Australian nomination in 2017 and finished with 15 goals for the year.

=== 2018 ===
Scully broke his ankle in the second round of the 2018 season against Collingwood after twisting on it in a tackle. He fractured the fibula in his right ankle and also sustained a syndesmosis injury. The severity of the injury led to fears that he might not play again. Scully's frustration with the Giants' handling of his injury and the need to free space in salary cap led to the former number one pick being traded to Hawthorn.

== Hawthorn ==
Scully was traded to Hawthorn at the end of the 2018 season for a future fourth round pick. Scully underwent a further operation on his ankle and spend most of the summer in rehab. Scully excelled with his rehab and he played his first game for Hawthorn against the Western Bulldogs in round 2, 2019. He didn't miss another game that year and was considered a steal of the year. The 2020 Covid restricted year and the shorter quarters hampered Scully ability to run out the quarters compare to his opposition, He missed a few games by being managed.

Scully retired on 2 February 2021.

== Statistics ==
Legend
| G | Goals | K | Kicks | D | Disposals | T | Tackles |
| B | Behinds | H | Handballs | M | Marks |

| Season | Team | No. | Games | Totals | | | | | | | Averages (per game) | | | | | | | Votes |
| Season | Team | No. | Games | G | B | K | H | D | M | T | G | B | K | H | D | M | T | Votes |
|---|---|---|---|---|---|---|---|---|---|---|---|---|---|---|---|---|---|---|
| 2010 | Melbourne | 31 | 21 | 5 | 3 | 197 | 255 | 452 | 80 | 81 | 0.2 | 0.1 | 9.4 | 12.1 | 21.5 | 3.8 | 3.9 | 3 |
| 2011 | Melbourne | 31 | 10 | 1 | 5 | 76 | 132 | 208 | 21 | 54 | 0.1 | 0.5 | 7.6 | 13.2 | 20.8 | 2.1 | 5.4 | 2 |
| 2012 | Greater Western Sydney | 9 | 19 | 4 | 4 | 177 | 209 | 386 | 51 | 85 | 0.2 | 0.2 | 9.3 | 11.0 | 20.3 | 2.7 | 4.5 | 0 |
| 2013 | Greater Western Sydney | 9 | 21 | 11 | 6 | 198 | 180 | 378 | 92 | 84 | 0.5 | 0.3 | 9.4 | 8.6 | 18.0 | 4.4 | 4.0 | 5 |
| 2014 | Greater Western Sydney | 9 | 15 | 5 | 5 | 139 | 158 | 297 | 49 | 68 | 0.3 | 0.3 | 9.3 | 10.5 | 19.8 | 3.3 | 4.5 | 1 |
| 2015 | Greater Western Sydney | 9 | 17 | 8 | 8 | 170 | 175 | 345 | 80 | 77 | 0.5 | 0.5 | 10.0 | 10.3 | 20.3 | 4.7 | 4.5 | 0 |
| 2016 | Greater Western Sydney | 9 | 24 | 23 | 13 | 282 | 308 | 590 | 112 | 103 | 1.0 | 0.5 | 11.8 | 12.8 | 24.6 | 4.7 | 4.3 | 7 |
| 2017 | Greater Western Sydney | 9 | 24 | 15 | 7 | 241 | 314 | 555 | 91 | 75 | 0.6 | 0.3 | 10.0 | 13.1 | 23.1 | 3.8 | 3.1 | 3 |
| 2018 | Greater Western Sydney | 9 | 1 | 1 | 0 | 3 | 2 | 5 | 1 | 1 | 1.0 | 0.0 | 3.0 | 2.0 | 5.0 | 1.0 | 1.0 | 0 |
| 2019 | Hawthorn | 21 | 21 | 12 | 6 | 195 | 193 | 388 | 67 | 49 | 0.6 | 0.3 | 9.3 | 9.2 | 18.5 | 3.2 | 2.3 | 2 |
| 2020 (Note: The 2020 season was played with 17 home-and-away matches per team (down from 22) and 16-minute quarters with time on (down from 20-minute quarters with time on) due to the impact of the COVID-19 pandemic.) | Hawthorn | 21 | 14 | 4 | 2 | 104 | 86 | 190 | 34 | 16 | 0.3 | 0.1 | 7.4 | 6.1 | 13.5 | 2.4 | 1.1 | 0 |
| Career | | | 187 | 89 | 59 | 1781 | 2012 | 3793 | 677 | 693 | 0.5 | 0.3 | 9.5 | 10.8 | 20.3 | 3.6 | 3.7 | 23 |

== Honours and achievements ==
Individual

- Harold Ball Memorial Trophy: 2010
- Greater Western Sydney coaches award: 2013
- AFL Rising Star nominee: 2010
- 2× Under 18 All-Australian team: 2008, 2009
