= James McDonald (Australian footballer) =

Australian rules footballer, born 1976

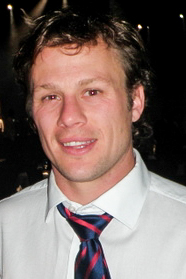
- McDonald in August 2009

Personal information
- Full name: James McDonald
- Born: 5 October 1976 (age 50)
- Original team: North Ballarat Rebels / Old Xaverians
- Height: 180 cm (5 ft 11 in)
- Weight: 75 kg (165 lb)
- Position: Midfielder

Playing career^{1}
| Years | Club | Games (Goals) |
| 1997–2010 | Melbourne | 251 (56) |
| 2012 | Greater Western Sydney | 13 (4) |
| Total | | 264 (60) |

International team honours^{2}
| Years | Team | Games (Goals) |
| 2006 | Australia | 1 (0) |
- ^{1} Playing statistics correct to the end of 2012.^{2} Representative statistics correct as of 2006.

Career highlights
- 2× Keith 'Bluey' Truscott Medallist: 2006, 2007; Melbourne captain: 2008–2010; All-Australian: 2006

James McDonald (born 5 October 1976) is a former professional Australian rules footballer who played for the Melbourne Football Club and Greater Western Sydney Giants in the Australian Football League (AFL).

== AFL career ==
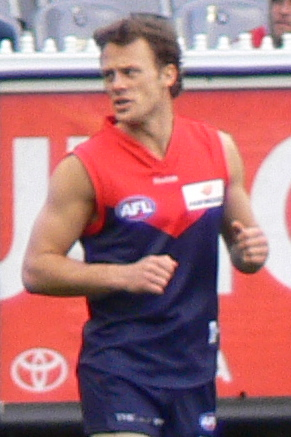
McDonald with Melbourne in 2009

Nicknamed "Junior", James is the brother of former AFL players Anthony McDonald and Alex McDonald. He is noted as a hard working in and under midfielder. In addition to this, he is also used as a tagger.

In 1995, McDonald suffered from chronic fatigue syndrome with his VAFA side Old Xaverians. He debuted in the AFL in 1997 with the Melbourne Football Club after being promoted off the Rookie list.

McDonald had one of his most consistent years in 2006, being named on the interchange bench in the All Australian side and the only Demons player to make this list in that year. He laid a league high and record high 143 tackles during season 2006, breaking the previous record held by Tony Liberatore (although Brett Kirk would break McDonald's record the following season), and capped off the season with a win in Melbourne's Best and Fairest.

McDonald also played in the International Rules Series in 2006.

McDonald won the Melbourne best and fairest in 2007 for the second time.

McDonald played his 200th game in a loss to the Western Bulldogs in Round 2, 2008. He was part of the Demons' Leadership Group, along with Cameron Bruce, Russell Robertson, Adem Yze and Brad Miller and was named co captain alongside Bruce in the absence of skipper David Neitz. However, after Neitz announced his retirement, no captain has been selected yet. After the 2008 home-and-away season, James signed a one-year deal to continue playing with Melbourne.

On 11 January 2009, the Herald Sun reported that McDonald would captain the club in 2009. McDonald kicked his 50th goal in the 2009 season.

McDonald signed another one-year extension that would see him to the end of the 2010 season. He also broke the record for the most games by a rookie-listed player (238). On 20 August, McDonald announced that he would retire at the end of the end of the 2010 season, saying he felt he could have played on for another year, but that the club came first and the club's decision was for him to retire at the end of the season.

McDonald played for his old side, Old Xaverians, in the Victorian Amateur Football Association, while also working with Greater Western Sydney's Melbourne-based players in a development role. At the end of 2011, McDonald signed a one-year contract with Greater Western Sydney. During the 2012 season, he was a playing assistant coach for the Giants. In his first game for the club, McDonald copped a two-game suspension for engaging in rough conduct on Sydney Swans player Luke Parker; ironically, he had served as a member on the Match Review Panel in the previous season.

== James McDonald Trophy ==
The James McDonald Trophy is presented to the player who best demonstrates the "Melbourne Spirit".

== Statistics ==
Legend
| G | Goals | K | Kicks | D | Disposals | T | Tackles |
| B | Behinds | H | Handballs | M | Marks |

| Season | Team | No. | Games | Totals | | | | | | | Averages (per game) | | | | | | |
| Season | Team | No. | Games | G | B | K | H | D | M | T | G | B | K | H | D | M | T |
|---|---|---|---|---|---|---|---|---|---|---|---|---|---|---|---|---|---|
| 1997 | Melbourne | 54 | 4 | 3 | 1 | 26 | 12 | 38 | 5 | 6 | 0.8 | 0.3 | 6.5 | 3.0 | 9.5 | 1.3 | 1.5 |
| 1998 | Melbourne | 23 | 22 | 10 | 12 | 158 | 81 | 239 | 52 | 20 | 0.5 | 0.5 | 7.2 | 3.7 | 10.9 | 2.4 | 0.9 |
| 1999 | Melbourne | 23 | 15 | 5 | 11 | 120 | 58 | 178 | 26 | 23 | 0.3 | 0.7 | 8.0 | 3.9 | 11.9 | 1.7 | 1.5 |
| 2000 | Melbourne | 23 | 17 | 7 | 6 | 137 | 100 | 237 | 46 | 38 | 0.4 | 0.4 | 8.1 | 5.9 | 13.9 | 2.7 | 2.2 |
| 2001 | Melbourne | 23 | 15 | 3 | 3 | 162 | 94 | 256 | 58 | 41 | 0.2 | 0.2 | 10.8 | 6.3 | 17.1 | 3.9 | 2.7 |
| 2002 | Melbourne | 23 | 20 | 2 | 4 | 176 | 124 | 300 | 59 | 58 | 0.1 | 0.2 | 8.8 | 6.2 | 15.0 | 3.0 | 2.9 |
| 2003 | Melbourne | 23 | 21 | 4 | 4 | 230 | 210 | 440 | 106 | 84 | 0.2 | 0.2 | 11.0 | 10.0 | 21.0 | 5.0 | 4.0 |
| 2004 | Melbourne | 23 | 18 | 3 | 4 | 213 | 122 | 335 | 76 | 76 | 0.2 | 0.2 | 11.8 | 6.8 | 18.6 | 4.2 | 4.2 |
| 2005 | Melbourne | 23 | 21 | 2 | 5 | 197 | 132 | 329 | 77 | 70 | 0.1 | 0.2 | 9.4 | 6.3 | 15.7 | 3.7 | 3.3 |
| 2006 | Melbourne | 23 | 24 | 6 | 7 | 301 | 254 | 555 | 115 | 143 | 0.3 | 0.3 | 12.5 | 10.6 | 23.1 | 4.8 | 6.0 |
| 2007 | Melbourne | 23 | 21 | 3 | 4 | 263 | 226 | 489 | 90 | 131 | 0.1 | 0.2 | 12.5 | 10.8 | 23.3 | 4.3 | 6.2 |
| 2008 | Melbourne | 23 | 19 | 1 | 3 | 194 | 185 | 379 | 83 | 88 | 0.1 | 0.2 | 10.2 | 9.7 | 19.9 | 4.4 | 4.6 |
| 2009 | Melbourne | 23 | 18 | 2 | 2 | 177 | 171 | 348 | 83 | 87 | 0.1 | 0.1 | 9.8 | 9.5 | 19.3 | 4.6 | 4.8 |
| 2010 | Melbourne | 23 | 16 | 5 | 1 | 182 | 178 | 360 | 49 | 119 | 0.3 | 0.1 | 11.4 | 11.1 | 22.5 | 3.1 | 7.4 |
| 2012 | Greater Western Sydney | 38 | 13 | 4 | 3 | 100 | 97 | 197 | 31 | 67 | 0.3 | 0.2 | 7.7 | 7.5 | 15.2 | 2.4 | 5.2 |
| Career | | | 264 | 60 | 70 | 2636 | 2044 | 4680 | 956 | 1051 | 0.2 | 0.3 | 10.0 | 7.7 | 17.7 | 3.6 | 4.0 |
