= List of AFL debuts in 2011 =

This is a list of players who made their Australian Football League (AFL) debut in a senior AFL match to date during the 2011 AFL season. In addition to those players making their AFL-level debuts, some players have made their debuts for a new club following a trade or re-drafting are also listed below in a separate table.

A senior AFL match is an Australian rules football match between two clubs that are, or have been in the past, members of the AFL. A senior AFL match is played under the laws of Australian football, and includes regular season matches, as well as finals series matches. It does not include pre-season competition matches, interstate matches or international rules football matches. The list is arranged in the order in which each player made his debut for a club in a senior AFL match. Where more than one player made his debut in the same match, those players are listed alphabetically by surname.

== AFL debuts ==
A total of 132 players made their début in the Australian Football League in 2011. The new Gold Coast played 34 new players and helped make 2011 the highest number of début players since West Coast and Brisbane Bears both joined the league in 1987. Each of the top 10 draft picks and 29 of the first 33 selections in the 2010 AFL draft made their début.

Players are listed in order of debut, and statistics are for AFL regular season and finals series matches during the 2011 AFL season only. Players marked "(rookie)" are players who were elevated from their clubs' rookie-list to the senior list, and therefore were eligible to represent the club in a senior AFL match.

| Order | Name | Club | Age at debut | Debut | Games in 2011 | Goals in 2011 | Rookie | Recruited from | League | Notes |
|---|---|---|---|---|---|---|---|---|---|---|
| 1 | Ed Curnow | Carlton | 21 years, 137 days | Round 1 | 12 | 3 | Rookie | Box Hill | VFL | |
| 2 | Nick Duigan | Carlton | 26 years, 198 days | Round 1 | 20 | 1 | | Norwood | SANFL | |
| 3 | Jake Batchelor | Richmond | 19 years, 39 days | Round 1 | 16 | 0 | | Dandenong Stingrays | TAC Cup | Round 16 Rising Star nomination |
| 4 | Reece Conca | Richmond | 18 years, 224 days | Round 1 | 17 | 0 | | Perth | WAFL | Round 9 Rising Star nomination |
| 5 | Brad Helbig | Richmond | 19 years, 24 days | Round 1 | 10 | 4 | | West Adelaide | SANFL | |
| 6 | Cameron Guthrie | Geelong | 18 years, 218 days | Round 1 | 2 | 0 | | Calder Cannons | TAC Cup | |
| 7 | Jarrad Irons | Port Adelaide | 18 years, 187 days | Round 1 | 3 | 3 | Rookie | Perth | WAFL | |
| 8 | Jasper Pittard | Port Adelaide | 19 years, 359 days | Round 1 | 13 | 2 | | Geelong Falcons | TAC Cup | Round 4 Rising Star nomination |
| 9 | Cam O'Shea | Port Adelaide | 19 years, 13 days | Round 1 | 18 | 4 | | Eastern Ranges | TAC Cup | |
| 10 | Brodie Smith | Adelaide | 19 years, 71 days | Round 1 | 15 | 2 | | Geelong Falcons | TAC Cup | |
| 11 | Claye Beams | Brisbane Lions | 19 years, 206 days | Round 1 | 5 | 5 | | Labrador | QAFL | brother of Dayne Beams, Round 1 nomination for 2012 AFL Rising Star |
| 12 | Rohan Bewick | Brisbane Lions | 21 years, 167 days | Round 1 | 12 | 5 | | West Perth | WAFL | son of Corey Bewick |
| 13 | Ryan Lester | Brisbane Lions | 18 years, 212 days | Round 1 | 3 | 2 | | Oakleigh Chargers | TAC Cup | |
| 14 | Jayden Pitt | Fremantle | 18 years, 170 days | Round 1 | 8 | 2 | | Geelong Falcons | TAC Cup | |
| 15 | Dyson Heppell | Essendon | 18 years, 317 days | Round 1 | 22 | 3 | | Gippsland Power | TAC Cup | Round 1 Rising Star nomination & overall winner |
| 16 | Lukas Markovic | Western Bulldogs | 24 years, 81 days | Round 1 | 16 | 0 | | Box Hill | VFL | |
| 17 | Tom Liberatore | Western Bulldogs | 18 years, 315 days | Round 1 | 16 | 4 | | Calder Cannons | TAC Cup | Son of Tony Liberatore |
| 18 | Luke Tapscott | Melbourne | 19 years, 272 days | Round 1 | 15 | 2 | | North Adelaide | SANFL | |
| 19 | Byron Sumner | Sydney | 19 years, 147 days | Round 1 | 1 | 0 | | Woodville-West Torrens | SANFL | |
| 20 | Jack Darling | West Coast | 18 years, 287 days | Round 1 | 21 | 20 | | West Perth | WAFL | Round 6 Rising Star nomination |
| 21 | Andrew Gaff | West Coast | 18 years, 284 days | Round 1 | 15 | 7 | | Oakleigh Chargers | TAC Cup | Round 19 Rising Star nomination |
| 22 | Shaun Atley | North Melbourne | 18 years, 195 days | Round 1 | 16 | 3 | | Murray Bushrangers | TAC Cup | |
| 23 | Cameron Pedersen | North Melbourne | 24 years, 10 days | Round 1 | 14 | 18 | Rookie | Box Hill | VFL | |
| 24 | Cameron Richardson | North Melbourne | 23 years, 115 days | Round 1 | 8 | 1 | | North Ballarat | VFL | |
| 25 | Daniel Archer | St Kilda | 19 years, 166 days | Round 2 | 1 | 0 | Rookie | Clarence | TFL | |
| 26 | Harley Bennell | Gold Coast | 18 years, 182 days | Round 2 | 14 | 14 | | Peel Thunder | WAFL | cousin of Jamie Bennell (Melbourne) |
| 27 | Charlie Dixon | Gold Coast | 20 years, 191 days | Round 2 | 10 | 6 | | Redland | QAFL | |
| 28 | Karmichael Hunt | Gold Coast | 24 years, 136 days | Round 2 | 16 | 1 | | | | former Brisbane Broncos (NRL) player |
| 29 | Marc Lock | Gold Coast | 19 years, 285 days | Round 2 | 1 | 0 | | Southport | QAFL | |
| 30 | Alik Magin | Gold Coast | 19 years, 354 days | Round 2 | 3 | 1 | Rookie | Pomona | AFLQ State Association | brother of Rhys Magin (Essendon) |
| 31 | Brandon Matera | Gold Coast | 19 years, 22 days | Round 2 | 12 | 15 | | South Fremantle | WAFL | Round 5 Rising Star nomination, son of Wally Matera (West Coast/Fitzroy) |
| 32 | Trent McKenzie | Gold Coast | 18 years, 364 days | Round 2 | 21 | 13 | | Western Jets | TAC Cup | Round 17 Rising Star nomination |
| 33 | Dion Prestia | Gold Coast | 18 years, 172 days | Round 2 | 17 | 1 | | Calder Cannons | TAC Cup | |
| 34 | Zac Smith | Gold Coast | 21 years, 39 days | Round 2 | 20 | 14 | | Glenmore Bulls | AFL Capricornia | Round 7 Rising Star nomination |
| 35 | David Swallow | Gold Coast | 18 years, 134 days | Round 2 | 21 | 11 | | East Fremantle | WAFL | Round 14 Rising Star nomination, brother of Andrew Swallow (North Melbourne) |
| 36 | Seb Tape | Gold Coast | 18 years, 239 days | Round 2 | 13 | 0 | | Glenelg | SANFL | |
| 37 | Josh Toy | Gold Coast | 18 years, 349 days | Round 2 | 8 | 1 | | Calder Cannons | TAC Cup | |
| 38 | Matthew Watson | Carlton | 18 years, 260 days | Round 2 | 3 | 0 | | Calder Cannons | TAC Cup | |
| 39 | Allen Christensen | Geelong | 19 years, 318 days | Round 2 | 17 | 16 | | Geelong Falcons | TAC Cup | Round 18 Rising Star nomination, nephew of Marty and Damien Christensen |
| 40 | Broc McCauley | Brisbane Lions | 24 years, 104 days | Round 2 | 3 | 0 | Rookie | Southport | QAFL | |
| 41 | Michael Coad | Gold Coast | 27 years, 208 days | Round 3 | 2 | 0 | | Sturt | SANFL | |
| 42 | Daniel Gorringe | Gold Coast | 18 years, 311 days | Round 3 | 7 | 2 | | Norwood | SANFL | |
| 43 | Maverick Weller | Gold Coast | 19 years, 55 days | Round 3 | 15 | 2 | | Burnie Dockers | TFL | |
| 44 | Alex Johnson | Sydney | 19 years, 38 days | Round 3 | 19 | 1 | | Oakleigh Chargers | TAC Cup | |
| 45 | Jared Polec | Brisbane Lions | 18 years, 180 days | Round 3 | 3 | 1 | | Woodville-West Torrens | SANFL | |
| 46 | Alistair Smith | St Kilda | 20 years, 214 days | Round 3 | 3 | 0 | | Perth | WAFL | |
| 47 | Luke Thompson | Adelaide | 20 years, 67 days | Round 4 | 11 | 2 | | Geelong Falcons | TAC Cup | |
| 48 | Matthew Wright | Adelaide | 21 years, 123 days | Round 4 | 19 | 18 | Rookie | North Adelaide | SANFL | |
| 49 | Luke Russell | Gold Coast | 21 years, 123 days | Round 4 | 11 | 5 | | Burnie Dockers | TFL | |
| 50 | Matt Shaw | Gold Coast | 19 years, 71 days | Round 4 | 15 | 7 | | Dandenong Stingrays | TAC Cup | |
| 51 | Jack Hutchins | Gold Coast | 19 years, 62 days | Round 5 | 6 | 0 | | Sandringham Dragons | TAC Cup | |
| 52 | Mitch Wallis | Western Bulldogs | 18 years, 183 days | Round 5 | 6 | 0 | | Calder Cannons | TAC Cup | son of Stephen Wallis, Round 4 nomination for 2012 AFL Rising Star |
| 53 | Kieran Harper | North Melbourne | 18 years, 319 days | Round 6 | 14 | 12 | | Eastern Ranges | TAC Cup | |
| 54 | Jamie Cripps | St Kilda | 19 years, 7 days | Round 6 | 4 | 7 | | East Fremantle | WAFL | |
| 55 | Will Johnson | St Kilda | 21 years, 186 days | Round 6 | 1 | 0 | | Sandringham | VFL | |
| 56 | Michael Hibberd | Essendon | 21 years, 118 days | Round 6 | 9 | 1 | | Frankston | VFL | |
| 57 | Steven May | Gold Coast | 19 years, 111 days | Round 6 | 9 | 0 | | Southern Districts | NTFL | |
| 58 | Liam Patrick | Gold Coast | 23 years, 58 days | Round 6 | 3 | 2 | | Wanderers | NTFL | cousin of Liam Jurrah |
| 59 | Paul Puopolo | Hawthorn | 23 years, 155 days | Round 7 | 18 | 4 | | Norwood | SANFL | |
| 60 | Isaac Smith | Hawthorn | 22 years, 127 days | Round 7 | 14 | 20 | | North Ballarat | VFL | |
| 61 | Zephaniah Skinner | Western Bulldogs | 21 years, 314 days | Round 7 | 1 | 0 | | Nightcliff | NTFL | |
| 62 | Nathan Gordon | Sydney | 21 years, 84 days | Round 7 | 2 | 1 | Rookie | East Coast Eagles | SFL | |
| 63 | Sam Day | Gold Coast | 18 years, 243 days | Round 7 | 7 | 2 | | Sturt | SANFL | |
| 64 | Joseph Daye | Gold Coast | 21 years, 94 days | Round 7 | 4 | 1 | | Zillmere Eagles | QAFL | |
| 65 | Tom Lynch | Gold Coast | 18 years, 188 days | Round 7 | 13 | 15 | | Dandenong Stingrays | TAC Cup | |
| 66 | Bryce Retzlaff | Brisbane Lions | 19 years, 312 days | Round 7 | 11 | 6 | | Labrador | QAFL | |
| 67 | Gerrick Weedon | West Coast | 19 years, 348 days | Round 7 | 1 | 0 | | Claremont | WAFL | |
| 68 | Arryn Siposs | St Kilda | 18 years, 165 days | Round 7 | 5 | 5 | | Dandenong Stingrays | TAC Cup | |
| 69 | Tom Nicholls | Gold Coast | 19 years, 71 days | Round 8 | 1 | 0 | | Sandringham Dragons | TAC Cup | |
| 70 | Ben Jacobs | Port Adelaide | 19 years, 125 days | Round 8 | 12 | 2 | | Sandringham Dragons | TAC Cup | |
| 71 | Luke Parker | Sydney | 18 years, 201 days | Round 8 | 12 | 8 | | Dandenong Stingrays | TAC Cup | |
| 72 | Luke Breust | Hawthorn | 20 years, 185 days | Round 8 | 17 | 30 | Rookie | NSW/ACT Rams | AFL NSW/ACT | Round 15 Rising Star nomination |
| 73 | Nathan Vardy | Geelong | 19 years, 329 days | Round 9 | 9 | 6 | | Gippsland Power | TAC Cup | |
| 74 | Michael Evans | Melbourne | 18 years, 312 days | Round 9 | 4 | 0 | Rookie | Claremont | WAFL | |
| 75 | Tendai Mzungu | Fremantle | 25 years, 82 days | Round 9 | 14 | 11 | | Perth | WAFL | |
| 76 | Nicholas Winmar | St Kilda | 20 years, 24 days | Round 9 | 2 | 0 | | Claremont | WAFL | |
| 77 | Josh Green | Brisbane Lions | 18 years, 270 days | Round 9 | 5 | 0 | | Clarence | TFL | |
| 78 | Luke Delaney | North Melbourne | 21 years, 331 days | Round 9 | 8 | 0 | | Geelong Falcons | TAC Cup | |
| 79 | Daniel Nicholson | Melbourne | 20 years, 206 days | Round 10 | 9 | 2 | Rookie | University Blues | VAFA | |
| 80 | Lewis Johnston | Sydney | 20 years, 86 days | Round 10 | 2 | 1 | | North Adelaide | SANFL | |
| 81 | Josh Cowan | Geelong | 20 years, 73 days | Round 10 | 3 | 1 | | North Ballarat Rebels | TAC Cup | |
| 82 | Christian Howard | Western Bulldogs | 20 years, 71 days | Round 10 | 6 | 1 | | Glenelg | SANFL | |
| 83 | Alex Browne | Essendon | 18 years, 298 days | Round 11 | 2 | 0 | | Oakleigh Chargers | TAC Cup | |
| 84 | Max Gawn | Melbourne | 19 years, 155 days | Round 11 | 4 | 1 | | Sandringham Dragons | TAC Cup | |
| 85 | Jeremy Howe | Melbourne | 20 years, 339 days | Round 11 | 13 | 18 | | Hobart | TFL | |
| 86 | Taylor Hine | Gold Coast | 19 years, 131 days | Round 11 | 1 | 0 | | Calder Cannons | TAC Cup | |
| 87 | James Mulligan | Western Bulldogs | 21 years, 355 days | Round 11 | 3 | 0 | | Southport | QAFL | |
| 88 | Tom Ledger | St Kilda | 19 years, 79 days | Round 11 | 2 | 1 | | Claremont | WAFL | |
| 89 | Tom Simpkin | St Kilda | 20 years, 301 days | Round 11 | 2 | 0 | | Geelong Falcons | TAC Cup | |
| 90 | Jordan Lisle | Hawthorn | 20 years, 328 days | Round 11 | 5 | 1 | | Oakleigh Chargers | TAC Cup | |
| 91 | Zach Tuohy | Carlton | 21 years, 177 days | Round 11 | 10 | 2 | Rookie | Laois | GAA | |
| 92 | Luke Dahlhaus | Western Bulldogs | 18 years, 293 days | Round 12 | 11 | 11 | Rookie | Geelong Falcons | TAC Cup | Round 21 Rising Star nomination |
| 93 | Rex Liddy | Gold Coast | 19 years, 160 days | Round 12 | 4 | 0 | | Kenmore | AFL Queensland | |
| 94 | Mitchell Golby | Brisbane Lions | 19 years, 252 days | Round 12 | 8 | 0 | Rookie | Gippsland Power | TAC Cup | |
| 95 | Alex Fasolo | Collingwood | 19 years, 5 days | Round 12 | 11 | 15 | | East Fremantle | WAFL | Round 22 Rising Star nomination |
| 96 | Jayden Schofield | Western Bulldogs | 19 years, 34 days | Round 13 | 7 | 0 | | East Fremantle | WAFL | |
| 97 | Patrick Karnezis | Brisbane Lions | 19 years, 56 days | Round 13 | 11 | 17 | | Oakleigh Chargers | TAC Cup | |
| 98 | Ben Bucovaz | Fremantle | 20 years, 229 days | Round 13 | 2 | 0 | Rookie | Geelong Falcons | TAC Cup | |
| 99 | Hayden Jolly | Gold Coast | 19 years, 82 days | Round 14 | 6 | 0 | | Glenelg | SANFL | |
| 100 | Joel Wilkinson | Gold Coast | 19 years, 208 days | Round 14 | 7 | 1 | | Broadbeach | QAFL | |
| 101 | Niall McKeever | Brisbane Lions | 22 years, 129 days | Round 14 | 10 | 1 | Rookie | County Antrim | GAA | |
| 102 | Josh Mellington | Fremantle | 18 years, 178 days | Round 14 | 2 | 1 | Rookie | Murray Bushrangers | TAC Cup | |
| 103 | Mitch Brown | Geelong | 20 years, 322 days | Round 14 | 2 | 3 | | Sandringham Dragons | TAC Cup | |
| 104 | Ian Callinan | Adelaide | 28 years, 188 days | Round 14 | 3 | 2 | Rookie | Central District | SANFL | |
| 105 | Rhys O'Keeffe | Carlton | 20 years, 322 days | Round 14 | 1 | 0 | | North Adelaide | SANFL | |
| 106 | Sam Blease | Melbourne | 20 years, 132 days | Round 15 | 5 | 0 | | Eastern Ranges | TAC Cup | Round 23 Rising Star nomination |
| 107 | Daniel Talia | Adelaide | 19 years, 273 days | Round 15 | 9 | 0 | | Calder Cannons | TAC Cup | |
| 108 | Luke Rounds | Collingwood | 20 years, 143 days | Round 15 | 5 | 1 | | Geelong Falcons | TAC Cup | |
| 109 | Rory Thompson | Gold Coast | 20 years, 119 days | Round 16 | 8 | 2 | | Southport | QAFL | |
| 110 | Lachlan Keeffe | Collingwood | 21 years, 87 days | Round 16 | 5 | 4 | | Gympie | AFL Queensland | |
| 111 | Wayde Twomey | Carlton | 25 years, 176 days | Round 17 | 2 | 1 | Rookie | Swan Districts | WAFL | |
| 112 | Scott Lycett | West Coast | 18 years, 307 days | Round 19 | 1 | 2 | | Port Adelaide Magpies | SANFL | |
| 113 | Jeremy Taylor | Gold Coast | 19 years, 43 days | Round 19 | 2 | 0 | | Geelong Falcons | TAC Cup | |
| 114 | Michael Ross | Essendon | 19 years, 318 days | Round 19 | 2 | 0 | | Gippsland Power | TAC Cup | |
| 115 | Ben Sinclair | Collingwood | 19 years, 303 days | Round 19 | 4 | 2 | | Oakleigh Chargers | TAC Cup | |
| 116 | Aidan Riley | Adelaide | 19 years, 230 days | Round 19 | 5 | 1 | Rookie | Wollongong Lions | Sydney AFL | |
| 117 | Josh Dyson | Brisbane Lions | 19 years, 360 days | Round 20 | 1 | 0 | Rookie | Eastern Ranges | TAC Cup | |
| 118 | Peter Faulks | Fremantle | 23 years, 111 days | Round 21 | 2 | 0 | | Williamstown | VFL | |
| 119 | John Butcher | Port Adelaide | 20 years, 41 days | Round 21 | 4 | 11 | | Gippsland Power | TAC Cup | |
| 120 | Tom Jonas | Port Adelaide | 20 years, 216 days | Round 21 | 4 | 0 | Rookie | Norwood | SANFL | |
| 121 | Tom Hickey | Gold Coast | 20 years, 167 days | Round 22 | 2 | 1 | | Morningside | QAFL | |
| 122 | Joel Tippett | Gold Coast | 22 years, 298 days | Round 22 | 2 | 0 | Rookie | Southport | QAFL | brother of Kurt Tippett |
| 123 | Aaron Mullett | North Melbourne | 19 years, 178 days | Round 22 | 3 | 0 | Rookie | Eastern Ranges | TAC Cup | Round 2 2013 Rising Star nomination |
| 124 | Tom Young | Collingwood | 19 years, 116 days | Round 22 | 2 | 2 | | Sydney University | Sydney AFL | |
| 125 | Ayce Cordy | Western Bulldogs | 21 years, 15 days | Round 22 | 2 | 0 | | Geelong Falcons | TAC Cup | son of Brian Cordy |
| 126 | Jason Tutt | Western Bulldogs | 20 years, 98 days | Round 22 | 3 | 5 | | NSW/ACT Rams | AFL NSW/ACT | |
| 127 | Josh Caddy | Gold Coast | 18 years, 334 days | Round 23 | 2 | 2 | | Northern Knights | TAC Cup | |
| 128 | Tom McDonald | Melbourne | 18 years, 344 days | Round 23 | 2 | 0 | | North Ballarat Rebels | TAC Cup | |
| 129 | Jacob Gillbee | Gold Coast | 18 years, 355 days | Round 24 | 1 | 1 | | Lauderdale | TFL | |
| 130 | Casey Sibosado | Fremantle | 20 years, 325 days | Round 24 | 1 | 1 | | Oakleigh Chargers | TAC Cup | |
| 131 | Jack Fitzpatrick | Melbourne | 20 years, 70 days | Round 24 | 1 | 1 | | Western Jets | TAC Cup | |
| 132 | Aaron Black | North Melbourne | 20 years, 279 days | Round 24 | 1 | 1 | | Peel Thunder | WAFL | |

== Change of clubs ==
Players are listed in order of debut, and statistics are for AFL regular season and finals series matches during the 2011 AFL season only. Players are only included if they had previously played a senior AFL match with another club. "Previous club(s)" years are from the season of the player's debut for their respective club to the year in which they played their final game for that club.

| Order | Name | Club | Debut | Games in 2011 | Goals in 2011 | Rookie | Previous club(s) |
|---|---|---|---|---|---|---|---|
| 1 | Jeremy Laidler | Carlton | Round 1 | 17 | 2 | | Geelong (2009–2010) |
| 2 | Shaun Grigg | Richmond | Round 1 | 21 | 6 | | Carlton (2007–2010) |
| 3 | Bachar Houli | Richmond | Round 1 | 22 | 5 | | Essendon (2007–2010) |
| 4 | Ryan Gamble | St Kilda | Round 1 | 11 | 11 | | Geelong (2006–2010) |
| 5 | Simon Buckley | Collingwood | Round 1 | 13 | 5 | | Melbourne (2007–2009) |
| 6 | Andrew Krakouer | Collingwood | Round 1 | 22 | 32 | | Richmond (2001–2007) |
| 7 | Richard Tambling | Adelaide | Round 1 | 10 | 0 | | Richmond (2005–2010) |
| 8 | Cameron Bruce | Hawthorn | Round 1 | 9 | 1 | | Melbourne (2000–2010) |
| 9 | David Hale | Hawthorn | Round 1 | 17 | 17 | | North Melbourne (2003–2010) |
| 10 | Nick Lower | Fremantle | Round 1 | 19 | 8 | Rookie | Port Adelaide (2006–2009) |
| 11 | Nathan Djerrkura | Western Bulldogs | Round 1 | 8 | 4 | | Geelong (2009–2010) |
| 12 | Justin Sherman | Western Bulldogs | Round 1 | 14 | 17 | | Brisbane Lions (2005–2010) |
| 13 | Andrejs Everitt | Sydney | Round 1 | 11 | 8 | | Western Bulldogs (2007–2010) |
| 14 | Ben McKinley | North Melbourne | Round 1 | 2 | 0 | | West Coast (2007–2010) |
| 15 | Gary Ablett | Gold Coast | Round 2 | 20 | 18 | | Geelong (2002–2010) |
| 16 | Nathan Bock | Gold Coast | Round 2 | 21 | 2 | | Adelaide (2004–2010) |
| 17 | Jared Brennan | Gold Coast | Round 2 | 22 | 11 | | Brisbane Lions (2003–2010) |
| 18 | Campbell Brown | Gold Coast | Round 2 | 14 | 0 | | Hawthorn (2002–2010) |
| 19 | Josh Fraser | Gold Coast | Round 2 | 16 | 12 | | Collingwood (2000–2010) |
| 20 | Jarrod Harbrow | Gold Coast | Round 2 | 22 | 2 | | Western Bulldogs (2007–2010) |
| 21 | Daniel Harris | Gold Coast | Round 2 | 11 | 2 | | North Melbourne (2001–2009) |
| 22 | Nathan Krakouer | Gold Coast | Round 2 | 13 | 8 | | Port Adelaide (2007–2010) |
| 23 | Michael Rischitelli | Gold Coast | Round 2 | 21 | 10 | | Brisbane Lions (2004–2010) |
| 24 | Danny Stanley | Gold Coast | Round 2 | 22 | 20 | | Collingwood (2007–2009) |
| 25 | Andrew Collins | Carlton | Round 3 | 2 | 0 | | Richmond (2009–2010) |
| 26 | Brad Miller | Richmond | Round 4 | 14 | 17 | | Melbourne (2002–2010) |
| 27 | Sam Iles | Gold Coast | Round 5 | 16 | 8 | | Collingwood (2006–2007) |
| 28 | Sam Jacobs | Adelaide | Round 5 | 19 | 3 | | Carlton (2009–2010) |
| 29 | Simon Phillips | Port Adelaide | Round 7 | 8 | 7 | | Sydney (2006–2007) |
| 30 | Dean Polo | St Kilda | Round 8 | 14 | 6 | | Richmond (2006–2010) |
| 31 | Jack Anthony | Fremantle | Round 8 | 4 | 0 | | Collingwood (2008–2010) |
| 32 | Jonathon Griffin | Fremantle | Round 10 | 7 | 4 | | Adelaide (2007–2010) |
| 33 | Kyle Cheney | Hawthorn | Round 11 | 8 | 1 | | Melbourne (2009–2010) |
| 34 | Ed Barlow | Western Bulldogs | Round 12 | 8 | 4 | Rookie | Sydney (2007–2010) |
| 35 | Matt Spangher | Sydney | Round 16 | 5 | 7 | | West Coast (2008–2010) |
| 36 | Nathan Ablett | Gold Coast | Round 22 | 2 | 1 | | Geelong (2005–2007) |
| 37 | Patrick Veszpremi | Western Bulldogs | Round 22 | 3 | 4 | | Sydney (2008–2010) |
| 38 | Paul Johnson | Hawthorn | Round 24 | 1 | 1 | Rookie | West Coast (2003), Melbourne (2005–2010) |
