= 2009 AFL draft =

Draft for the Australian Football League

General information
- Dates: 26 November 2009; 15 December 2009
- Network: Fox Sports
- Sponsored by: National Australia Bank

Overview
- League: AFL
- First selection: Tom Scully (Melbourne)

The 2009 AFL draft consisted of four opportunities for player acquisitions during the 2009/10 Australian Football League off-season. These were the trade week (held between 5 October and 9 October), the national draft (held on 26 November), the pre-season draft (15 December) and the rookie draft (15 December).

== Player movements ==
In the lead up to the trade week many high-profile players such as Brendan Fevola, Darren Jolly, Shaun Burgoyne, Luke Ball, Barry Hall, Andrew Lovett and Josh Gibson either requested to be traded or were suggested to be likely to be traded during the AFL's annual trading period. Of these players, only Luke Ball was unable to secure a trade by the end of the week.

Trade week was significantly more active than the previous year. Four trades involving seven players, including a three-team, four-player trade, were completed on the first day of the trade week alone, compared to only six players traded in the entire 2008 trade week. Overall, twenty-three players changed clubs (the most since the 2003 trade week), and twenty-five draft picks were traded. Of the sixteen active clubs, only the Adelaide Crows did not make a trade.

This was the first season in which teams were permitted to trade rookie-listed players, with Geelong's Shane Mumford being the first player to be traded whilst still officially on the rookie list.

=== Fevola trade ===
The most widely anticipated trade during trade week was that of Carlton full forward and incumbent Coleman medallist Brendan Fevola. Carlton announced its intentions to trade the 28-year-old Fevola after his drunken behaviour at the 2009 Brownlow Medal Count, which served as the last straw in a long rap sheet of off-field indiscretions while at the club.

The Brisbane Lions emerged as the likely destination. Brisbane initially offered 31-year-old full-forward Daniel Bradshaw and 23-year-old midfielder Michael Rischitelli in the trade. Both players were flown to Melbourne to tour Carlton's facilities, but Rischitelli was not willing to relocate. On the final day of trade week, Brisbane agreed to give Carlton 19-year-old key position prospect Lachlan Henderson and a first round draft pick, in exchange for Fevola, a second-round draft pick, and for Carlton to pay $100,000 of Fevola's salary for each of the two years remaining on his existing contract.

Although considered reasonable at the time, the trade is now widely viewed as a complete disaster for the Brisbane Lions, because all players involved in the trade negotiations had left the club within eighteen months. Shortly after trade, Bradshaw walked out on the Lions, and was recruited to the Sydney Swans in the pre-season draft – either because his feelings were hurt by being offered to trade, or because Fevola's recruitment would have limited Bradshaw's own opportunities in the Lions' forward-line. Rischitelli left the club at the end of 2010, after signing a contract with league newcomers Gold Coast; some in the media speculated that he was also disgruntled about being offered in the Fevola trade, but this has never been confirmed. Finally, prior to the 2011 season, Brisbane sacked Fevola after further off-field incidents during the 2010/11 offseason.

=== Trades ===
Trade	Player traded^{Note 1}	Original club	New club	Traded for
1	Josh Gibson and draft pick No. 69	North Melbourne	Hawthorn	Draft picks No. 25 and 41
2	Andrew Raines	Richmond	Brisbane Lions	Draft pick No. 44
3	Brock McLean	Melbourne	Carlton	Draft pick No. 11
4	Brent Staker and draft pick No. 39; Amon Buchanan	West Coast; Sydney	Brisbane Lions	Bradd Dalziell; Draft pick No. 28
4	Mark Seaby and draft pick No. 55; Draft pick No. 28	West Coast; Brisbane Lions	Sydney	Amon Buchanan; Draft picks No. 22 and 118
4	Bradd Dalziell; Draft picks No. 22 and 118	Brisbane Lions; Sydney	West Coast	Brent Staker and draft pick No. 39; Mark Seaby and draft pick No. 55
5	Barry Hall	Sydney	Western Bulldogs	Draft pick No. 47
6	Andrew Lovett	Essendon	St Kilda	Draft pick No. 16
7^{Note 2}	Draft pick No. 47	Sydney	Brisbane Lions	Draft pick No. 39
8	Brett Peake	Fremantle	St Kilda	Draft pick No. 48
9	Jay Schulz	Richmond	Port Adelaide	Mitchell Farmer and draft pick No. 71
10	Xavier Clarke	St Kilda	Brisbane Lions	Draft pick No. 60
11	Darren Jolly	Sydney	Collingwood	Draft picks No. 14 and 46
12	Shane Mumford	Geelong	Sydney	Draft pick No. 28
13	Ben McGlynn and Josh P. Kennedy	Hawthorn	Sydney	Draft picks No. 39, 46 and 70
14	Shaun Burgoyne	Port Adelaide	Hawthorn	Jay Nash and draft pick No. 9
14	Jay Nash and draft pick No. 16; Draft pick No. 9 Draft pick No. 97	Essendon; Hawthorn; Geelong	Port Adelaide	Shaun Burgoyne and draft picks No. 24, 40 and 56
14	Mark Williams; Draft pick No. 24; Draft pick No. 33	Hawthorn; Port Adelaide; Geelong	Essendon	Jay Nash, draft picks No. 16 and 42
14	Draft picks No. 40 and 56; Draft pick No. 42	Port Adelaide; Essendon	Geelong	Draft picks No. 33 and 97
15	Marcus Drum	Fremantle	Geelong	Draft pick No. 49
16	Brendan Fevola and draft pick No. 27	Carlton	Brisbane Lions	Lachlan Henderson and draft pick No. 12
17^{Note 3}	Draft pick No. 58	Essendon	Hawthorn	Draft pick No. 89

Source:AFL Trade Tracker

1. The numbering of the draft picks in this trades table is based on the original order prior to draft day. The final numbering of many of these draft picks was adjusted on draft day due to clubs passing in the later rounds.
2. Although lodged as a separate trade, this exchange of draft picks is effectively part of the three-team trade amongst Sydney, Brisbane and West Coast (trade No. 4).
3. Although lodged as a separate trade, this exchange of draft picks is effectively part of the four-team trade amongst Hawthorn, Essendon, Port Adelaide and Geelong (trade No. 14).

=== Retirements and delistings ===
Name	Club	Date	Notes
Nic Fosdike	Sydney	9 January 2009	Retirement, persistent knee injury.
Tadhg Kennelly	Sydney	29 January 2009	Returned temporarily to Ireland.
Kane Johnson	Richmond	9 June 2009	Retirement, brought forward from the end-of-season due to ongoing knee injury.
Michael O'Loughlin	Sydney	23 June 2009	Retirement at end of season.
Barry Hall	Sydney	7 July 2009	Quit the Swans, may play elsewhere in 2010.
Adam Simpson	North Melbourne	27 July 2009	Retirement, effective immediately.
Stuart Dew	Hawthorn	11 August 2009	Retirement, effective immediately.
Joel Bowden	Richmond	12 August 2009	Retirement, effective after Round 20 match against Collingwood.
Paul Wheatley	Melbourne	14 August 2009	Retirement, effective at the end of the season.
Matthew Whelan	Melbourne	14 August 2009	Retirement, effective at the end of the season.
Scott Lucas	Essendon	18 August 2009	Retirement, effective immediately
Leo Barry	Sydney	18 August 2009	Retirement, effective at the end of the season.
Russell Robertson	Melbourne	20 August 2009	Delisted, contract not renewed, wants to continue playing at another club.
Shannon Watt	North Melbourne	20 August 2009	Retirement, effective after Round 21 match against St Kilda.
Jared Crouch	Sydney	20 August 2009	Retirement
Brendon Lade	Port Adelaide	26 August 2009	Retirement, effective at the end of the 2009 season.
Peter Burgoyne	Port Adelaide	26 August 2009	Retirement, effective at the end of the 2009 season.
Matthew Egan	Geelong	26 August 2009	Delisted (voluntarily) following long-term injury.
Jarryd Allen	St Kilda	26 August 2009	Retirement, ongoing hip injury.
Adam Hunter	West Coast	28 August 2009	Retirement, effective immediately, shoulder injury.
Nathan Brown	Richmond	28 August 2009	Delisted
Mark Coughlan	Richmond	28 August 2009	Delisted
Chad Fletcher	West Coast	28 August 2009	Retirement
David Wirrpanda	West Coast	28 August 2009	Retirement
Andrew Browne	Fremantle	3 September 2009	Delisted
Adam Campbell	Fremantle	3 September 2009	Delisted
Daniel Gilmore	Fremantle	3 September 2009	Delisted
Josh Head	Fremantle	3 September 2009	Delisted
Toby Thurstans	Port Adelaide	3 September 2009	Retirement
Tim Notting	Brisbane Lions	7 September 2009	Retirement.
Tyson Stenglein	West Coast	11 September 2009	Retirement
Anthony Rocca	Collingwood	22 September 2009	Retirement
Matthew Lloyd	Essendon	23 September 2009	Retirement
Scott Welsh	Western Bulldogs	23 September 2009	Retirement
Wayde Skipper	Western Bulldogs	23 September 2009	Delisted
Cameron Wight	Western Bulldogs	23 September 2009	Delisted
Paul O'Shea	Western Bulldogs	23 September 2009	Delisted.
Martin Clarke	Collingwood	24 September 2009	Quit the AFL, returned to Ireland, Homesick
Max Hudghton	St Kilda	27 September 2009	Retirement
Greg Gallman	Adelaide	13 October 2009	Delisted.
Nick Gill	Adelaide	13 October 2009	Delisted.
Aaron Kite	Adelaide	13 October 2009	Delisted.
Tom Lee	Adelaide	13 October 2009	Delisted.
James Moss (rookie)	Adelaide	13 October 2009	Delisted.
Robert Shirley	Adelaide	13 October 2009	Delisted.
Adam Donohue	Geelong	13 October 2009	Delisted.
Dan McKenna	Geelong	13 October 2009	Delisted.
Scott Simpson	Geelong	13 October 2009	Delisted.
Kane Tenace	Geelong	13 October 2009	Delisted.
Bryn Weadon (rookie)	Geelong	13 October 2009	Delisted.
Scott Clouston	Brisbane Lions	15 October 2009	Delisted.
Daniel Dzufer (rookie)	Brisbane Lions	15 October 2009	Delisted.
Pat Garner (rookie)	Brisbane Lions	15 October 2009	Delisted.
Scott Harding	Brisbane Lions	15 October 2009	Delisted.
Rhan Hooper	Brisbane Lions	15 October 2009	Delisted.
Kieran King	Brisbane Lions	15 October 2009	Delisted.
Joel Macdonald	Brisbane Lions	15 October 2009	Delisted.
Daniel Murray (rookie)	Brisbane Lions	15 October 2009	Delisted.
Jason Roe	Brisbane Lions	15 October 2009	Delisted.
Adam Spackman (rookie)	Brisbane Lions	15 October 2009	Delisted.
Joel Tippett (rookie)	Brisbane Lions	15 October 2009	Delisted.
Matthew Tyler	Brisbane Lions	15 October 2009	Delisted.
Tom Harley	Geelong	22 October 2009	Retirement.
David Johnson	Geelong	29 October 2009	Retirement.
Daniel Bradshaw	Brisbane Lions	30 October 2009	Delisted.
Shannon Cox	Collingwood	12 November 2009	Retirement.

== 2009 national draft ==
The 2009 national draft was held on 26 November, a Thursday evening, rather than the Saturday morning timeslot that has been used in the past years. For the first time, the top ten selections will be made prior to the telecast, and unveiled in a countdown manner from ten to one, rather than the usual counting up method.

Melbourne finished the 2009 AFL season in last position and as they had won fewer than 5 games during each previous two seasons, they have the first two selections in the draft. This proved controversial as it was later revealed that the club had deliberately lost matches towards the end of the season; after a thorough investigation, the club was fined $500,000 in 2013. Despite much discussion concerning tanking during the season, no other club qualified for a priority pick.

In the lead up to the draft, it was widely tipped that Tom Scully and Jack Trengove would be Melbourne's first two selections. The destination of former St Kilda captain Luke Ball was also subject to much debate, with Collingwood being the likely club after failing to secure a trade for him during the October trade week.

^	Denotes player who has been inducted to the Australian Football Hall of Fame
*	Denotes player who has been a premiership player and been selected for at least one All-Australian team
^{+}	Denotes player who has been a premiership player at least once
^{x}	Denotes player who has been selected for at least one All-Australian team
^{#}	Denotes player who has never played in a VFL/AFL home and away season or finals game
^{~}	Denotes player who has been selected as Rising Star

Round	Pick	Player	Recruited from	League	Club
Priority	1	Tom Scully	Dandenong Stingrays	TAC Cup	Melbourne
1	2	Jack Trengove	Sturt	SANFL	Melbourne
1	3	Dustin Martin	Bendigo Pioneers	TAC Cup	Richmond
1	4	Anthony Morabito	Peel	WAFL	Fremantle
1	5	Ben Cunnington	Geelong Falcons	TAC Cup	North Melbourne
1	6	Gary Rohan	Geelong Falcons	TAC Cup	Sydney
1	7	Brad Sheppard	East Fremantle	WAFL	West Coast
1	8	John Butcher	Gippsland Power	TAC Cup	Port Adelaide
1	9	Andrew Moore	Eastern Ranges	TAC Cup	Port Adelaide
1	10	Jake Melksham	Calder Cannons	TAC Cup	Essendon
1	11	Jordan Gysberts	Eastern Ranges	TAC Cup	Melbourne
1	12	Kane Lucas	East Fremantle	WAFL	Carlton
1	13	Daniel Talia	Calder Cannons	TAC Cup	Adelaide
1	14	Lewis Jetta	Swan Districts	WAFL	Sydney
1	15	Christian Howard	Glenelg	SANFL	Western Bulldogs
1	16	Jasper McMillan-Pittard	Geelong Falcons	TAC Cup	Port Adelaide
1	17	Daniel Menzel	Central District	SANFL	Geelong
2	18	Luke Tapscott	North Adelaide	SANFL	Melbourne
2	19	Benjamin Griffiths	Eastern Ranges	TAC Cup	Richmond
2	20	Nathan Fyfe	Claremont	WAFL	Fremantle
2	21	Ryan Bastinac	Dandenong Stingrays	TAC Cup	North Melbourne
2	22	Gerrick Weedon	Claremont	WAFL	West Coast
2	23	Koby Stevens	Gippsland Power	TAC Cup	West Coast
2	24	Jake Carlisle	Calder Cannons	TAC Cup	Essendon
2	25	Aaron Black	Peel	WAFL	North Melbourne
2	26	Travis Colyer	Claremont	WAFL	Essendon
2	27	Callum Bartlett	Geelong Falcons	TAC Cup	Brisbane Lions
2	28	Mitch Duncan	East Perth	WAFL	Geelong
2	29	Jack Gunston	Sandringham Dragons	TAC Cup	Adelaide
2	30	Luke Ball	St Kilda	AFL	Collingwood
2	31	Jason Tutt	Ainslie	NEAFL	Western Bulldogs
2	32	Nicholas Winmar	Claremont	WAFL	St Kilda
2	33	Anthony Long	Calder Cannons	TAC Cup	Essendon
3	34	Max Gawn	Sandringham Dragons	TAC Cup	Melbourne
3	35	David Astbury	North Ballarat Rebels	TAC Cup	Richmond
3	36	Joel Houghton	Perth	WAFL	Fremantle
3	37	Jamie Macmillan	Oakleigh Chargers	TAC Cup	North Melbourne
3	38	Sam Reid	Murray Bushrangers	TAC Cup	Sydney
3	39	Sam Grimley	Northern Knights	TAC Cup	Hawthorn
3	40	Allen Christensen	Geelong Falcons	TAC Cup	Geelong
3	41	Ayden Kennedy	Eastern Ranges	TAC Cup	North Melbourne
3	42	Nathan Vardy	Gippsland Power	TAC Cup	Geelong
3	43	Marcus Davies	North Hobart	TSL	Carlton
3	44	Matthew Dea	North Ballarat Rebels	TAC Cup	Richmond
3	45	Sam Shaw	Oakleigh Chargers	TAC Cup	Adelaide
3	46	Ben Stratton	East Perth	WAFL	Hawthorn
3	47	Ryan Harwood	Glenorchy	TSL	Brisbane Lions
3	48	Jesse Crichton	North Launceston	TSL	Fremantle
3	49	Dylan Roberton	Dandenong Stingrays	TAC Cup	Fremantle
4	50	Jack Fitzpatrick	Western Jets	TAC Cup	Melbourne
4	51	Troy Taylor	South Alice Springs	CAFL	Richmond
4	52	Justin Bollenhagen	South Adelaide	SANFL	Fremantle
4	53	Brayden Norris	Murray Bushrangers	TAC Cup	North Melbourne
4	54	Byron Sumner	Woodville-West Torrens	SANFL	Sydney
4	55	Trent Dennis-Lane	Subiaco	WAFL	Sydney
4	56	Josh Cowan	North Ballarat Rebels	TAC Cup	Geelong
4	57	Jordan Williams	Bendigo Pioneers	TAC Cup	Hawthorn
4	58	Rhan Hooper	Brisbane Lions	AFL	Hawthorn
4	59	Rohan Kerr	Dandenong Stingrays	TAC Cup	Carlton
4	60	Jesse W. Smith	North Melbourne	AFL	St Kilda
4	61	James Craig	North Adelaide	SANFL	Adelaide
4	62	Ben Sinclair	Oakleigh Chargers	TAC Cup	Collingwood
4	63	Lukas Markovic	Box Hill Hawks	VFL	Western Bulldogs
4	64	Adam Pattison	Richmond	AFL	St Kilda
4	65	Jeremy Laidler	(Promoted rookie)		Geelong
5	66	Pass			Melbourne
5	67	Jeromey Webberley	Clarence	TSL	Richmond
5	68	Pass			Fremantle
5	69	Taylor Duryea	Murray Bushrangers	TAC Cup	Hawthorn
5	70	Matt Suckling	(Promoted rookie)		Hawthorn
5	71	Ben Nason	Central District	SANFL	Richmond
5	72	Sam Jacobs	(Promoted rookie)		Carlton
5	73	Jesse O'Brien	North Adelaide	SANFL	Brisbane Lions
5	74	Brodie Martin	(Promoted rookie)		Adelaide
5	75	Josh Thomas	Redland	QAFL	Collingwood
5	76	Shane Thorne	Wanderers	NTFL	Western Bulldogs
5	77	Will Johnson	Sandringham	VFL	St Kilda
6	78	Pass			Richmond
6	79	Greg Broughton	(Promoted rookie)		Fremantle
6	80	Cruize Garlett	(Promoted rookie)		North Melbourne
6	81	Pass			Sydney
6	82	Daniel Stewart	(Promoted rookie)		Port Adelaide
6	83	Aaron Joseph	(Promoted rookie)		Carlton
6	84	Bryce Retzlaff	Labrador	QAFL	Brisbane Lions
6	85	Simon Buckley	Melbourne	AFL	Collingwood
6	86	Liam Picken	(Promoted rookie)		Western Bulldogs
6	87	Zac Dawson	(Promoted rookie)		St Kilda
6	88	Wade Thompson	(Promoted rookie)		Port Adelaide
7	89	Robin Nahas	(Promoted rookie)		Richmond
7	90	Kristin Thornton	(Promoted rookie)		Sydney
7	91	Matt Maguire	St Kilda	AFL	Brisbane Lions
7	92	James Mulligan	(Promoted rookie)		Western Bulldogs
7	93	Luke Miles	(Promoted rookie)		St Kilda
8	94	Andrew Browne	(Promoted rookie)		Richmond
8	95	Pearce Hanley	(Promoted rookie)		Brisbane Lions

== 2010 pre-season draft ==
The 2010 pre-season draft was held on Tuesday 15 December. Unlike the national draft, it is an online meeting using Microsoft Office Live Meeting software.

Round	Pick	Player	Recruited from	League	Club
1	1	Joel Macdonald	Brisbane Lions	AFL	Melbourne
1	2	Dylan Grimes	Northern Knights	TAC Cup	Richmond
1	3	Adam McPhee	Essendon	AFL	Fremantle
1	4	Daniel Bradshaw	Brisbane Lions	AFL	Sydney
1	5	Ryan Neates	Claremont	WAFL	West Coast
1	6	Scott Harding	Brisbane Lions	AFL	Port Adelaide
1	7	Kyle Hardingham	East Fremantle	WAFL	Essendon

== 2010 rookie draft ==
The 2010 rookie draft was held on Tuesday 15 December, immediately after the pre-season draft. Unlike the national draft, it is an online meeting using Microsoft Office Live Meeting software. The rookie draft rules allow each club to have up to eight rookies, and for the first time allowed clubs to retain rookies for a third year and be able to draft two mature-age rookies, without the restriction that they must not have been previously listed by an AFL club. The Gold Coast Football Club was allocated the first five selections, despite the new club only competing in the Victorian Football League for the 2010 season, before entering the AFL for the 2011 season.

Round	Pick	Player	Recruited from	League	Selection category	Club
1	1	Daniel Harris	North Melbourne	AFL	Mature-age rookie	Gold Coast
1	2	Michael Coad	Sturt	SANFL	Mature-age rookie	Gold Coast
1	3	Sam Iles	Box Hill Hawks	TAC Cup		Gold Coast
1	4	Roland Ah Chee	Norwood	SANFL		Gold Coast
1	5	Danny Stanley	Collingwood	AFL		Gold Coast
1	6	Michael Newton	Melbourne	AFL	Mature-age rookie	Melbourne
1	7	Robert Hicks	Calder Cannons	TAC Cup		Richmond
1	8	Michael Barlow	Werribee	VFL		Fremantle
1	9	Majak Daw	Western Jets	TAC Cup		North Melbourne
1	10	Henry Playfair	Sydney Swans	AFL	Mature-age rookie	Sydney Swans
1	11	Lewis Broome	Claremont	WAFL		West Coast
1	12	Cameron Hitchcock	Glenelg	SANFL		Port Adelaide
1	13	Wayde Skipper	Western Bulldogs	AFL	Mature-age rookie	Hawthorn
1	14	Taite Silverlock	West Adelaide	SANFL		Essendon
1	15	Jaryd Cachia	Northern Knights	TAC Cup		Carlton
1	16	Mitchell Golby	Gippsland Power	TAC Cup		Brisbane Lions
1	17	Luke Thompson	Geelong Falcons	TAC Cup		Adelaide
1	18	Tom Hunter	Calder Cannons	TAC Cup		Collingwood
1	19	Brodie Moles	Geelong	AFL	Mature-age rookie	Western Bulldogs
1	20	Mark Hutchings	East Perth	WAFL		St Kilda
1	21	Jack Weston	Gippsland Power	TAC Cup		Geelong
2	22	John Meesen	Melbourne	AFL	Mature-age rookie	Melbourne
2	23	Pat Contin	Glenelg	SANFL		Richmond
2	24	Alex Silvagni	Casey Scorpions	VFL	Mature-age rookie	Fremantle
2	25	Matthew Scott	Eastern Ranges	TAC Cup		North Melbourne
2	26	Pass				Sydney Swans
2	27	Andrew Strijk	West Perth	WAFL		West Coast
2	28	Daniel Webb	West Adelaide	SANFL		Port Adelaide
2	29	Jarrod Kayler-Thomson	Perth	WAFL	Mature-age rookie	Hawthorn
2	30	Ben Howlett	Peel Thunder	WAFL		Essendon
2	31	Joe Dare	Geelong Falcons	TAC Cup		Carlton
2	32	Josh Dyson	Eastern Ranges	TAC Cup		Brisbane Lions
2	33	Matthew Wright	North Adelaide	SANFL		Adelaide
2	34	Jack Carter	West Adelaide	SANFL		Collingwood
2	35	Andrew Hooper	North Ballarat Rebels	TAC Cup		Western Bulldogs
2	36	Daniel Archer	Clarence	TSL		St Kilda
2	37	Ben Johnson	Geelong	VFL		Geelong
3	38	Relton Roberts	Wanderers	NTFL	Mature-age rookie	Richmond
3	39	Pass				Sydney Swans
3	40	Ashton Hams	South Fremantle	WAFL		West Coast
3	41	Cameron Cloke	Carlton	AFL	Mature-age rookie	Port Adelaide
3	42	Michael Johnston	East Coast Eagles	Sydney AFL	NSW AFL scholarship elevation	Hawthorn
3	43	Stewart Crameri	Bendigo Bombers	VFL		Essendon
3	44	Levi Casboult	Dandenong Stingrays	TAC Cup		Carlton
3	45	Pass				Brisbane Lions
3	46	Matthew Jaensch	Sturt	SANFL		Adelaide
3	47	Seamus McNamara	Milwaukee	USA	International selection	Collingwood
3	48	Matthew Panos	Norwood	SANFL		Western Bulldogs
3	49	Jarryd Allen	St Kilda	AFL		St Kilda
3	50	James Podsiadly	Geelong VFL	VFL	Mature-age rookie	Geelong
4	51	Nicholas Westhoff	West Adelaide	SANFL		Richmond
4	52	Pass				Sydney Swans
4	53	Jarrad Oakley-Nicholls	Richmond	AFL	Mature-age rookie	West Coast
4	54	Glenn Dawson	Port Adelaide	AFL		Port Adelaide
4	55	Marcus Marigliani	Frankston	VFL	Mature-age rookie	Essendon
4	56	Simon White	Subiaco	WAFL		Carlton
4	57	Pass				Brisbane Lions
4	58	Aidan Riley	Wollongong Lions	Sydney AFL	NSW AFL scholarship elevation	Adelaide
4	59	Eddie Prato	Maryborough	BFL		Western Bulldogs
4	60	Leigh Fisher	St Kilda	AFL		St Kilda
4	61	Jesse Stringer	Port Adelaide Magpies	SANFL		Geelong
5	62	Graham Polak	Richmond	AFL	Mature-age rookie	Richmond
5	63	Chrissy McKaigue	Derry	GAA	International selection	Sydney Swans
5	64	Daniel Bass	non-registered		3-year non-registered selection	Port Adelaide
5	65	John Williams	Essendon	AFL		Essendon
5	66	Joshua Donaldson	West Perth	WAFL		Carlton
5	67	Niall McKeever	Antrim	GAA	International selection	Brisbane Lions
5	68	Patrick Rose	Williamstown	VFL		Western Bulldogs
5	69	Tommy Walsh	Kerry	GAA	International selection	St Kilda
6	70	Jamie O'Reilly	Down	GAA	International selection	Richmond
6	71	Nathan Gordon	East Coast Eagles	Sydney AFL	NSW AFL scholarship elevation	Sydney Swans
6	72	Jordon Johns	South Broken Hill	BHFL	NSW AFL scholarship elevation	Port Adelaide
6	73	Zach Tuohy	Laois	GAA	International selection	Carlton
6	74	Sean Yoshuira	Mt Gravatt	QAFL	QLD pre-selection	Brisbane Lions
7	75	Dylan McNeil	Murray Bushrangers	TAC Cup	NSW pre-selection	Sydney Swans
7	76	Claye Beams	Labrador	QAFL	QLD pre-selection	Brisbane Lions
8	77	Pass			NSW pre-selection	Sydney Swans
8	78	Broc McCauley	Southport	QAFL	QLD pre-selection	Brisbane Lions

== Selections by league ==
National and pre-season draft selection totals by leagues:

League	Players selected	State
TAC Cup	37	VIC
WAFL	15	WA
SANFL	9	SA
TSL	4	TAS
VFL	2	VIC
QAFL	2	QLD
NTFL	1	NT
CAFL	1	NT
NEAFL	1	
