= Cameron Wight =

Australian rules footballer (born 1985)

Personal information
- Born: 5 April 1985 (age 41)
- Original team: Calder Cannons
- Debut: Round 8, 2006, Western Bulldogs vs. Kangaroos, at Telstra Dome
- Height: 200 cm (6 ft 7 in)
- Weight: 95 kg (209 lb)

Playing career^{1}
Years	Club	Games (Goals)
2005–2008	Western Bulldogs	36 (6)
- ^{1} Playing statistics correct to the end of 2008.

Cameron Wight (born 5 April 1985) is an Australian rules footballer who played for the Western Bulldogs in the Australian Football League.

The son of former Collingwood player Terry Wight, he was picked in the 2002 AFL draft at pick 49 from the Calder Cannons.

At the end of the 2009 season, Wight was delisted by the Bulldogs.

In November 2010 it was announced that Wight would be playing at Greenvale in the Essendon District Football League under new senior coach Anthony Rock.
