= Marcus Marigliani =

Australian rules footballer (born 1985)

Personal information
- Full name: Marcus Marigliani
- Born: 5 December 1985 (age 40)
- Original team: Seaford Tigers Football Netball Club
- Draft: 55th overall, 2009 Rookie Draft; Essendon
- Height: 182 cm (6 ft 0 in)
- Weight: 86 kg (190 lb)
- Position: Midfield

Club information
- Current club: Essendon VFL
- Number: 47

Playing career
Years	Club	Games (Goals)
2010	Essendon	2 (2)

Marcus Marigliani (born 5 December 1985) is an Australian rules footballer who played for the Essendon Football Club in the Australian Football League (AFL) and started his career at Seaford football club in the MPNFL.

Marigliani was selected by Essendon with the fifty-fifth pick in the 2010 AFL Rookie Draft. He was drafted from Seaford tigers in the MPNFL. He was one of the most consistent performers in the vfl league over the past couple of years, earning selection in the VFL Team of the Year in 2008 and 2009. He played a total of 98 games for Frankston during his career there.

Marigliani played only the last two games of the 2010 home and away season for Essendon, and was delisted at the end of the season. He performed strongly for Essendon's VFL-affiliate, Bendigo, during the year, and finished equal fifth in the J. J. Liston Trophy.

Marigliani resumed working as a carpenter after being delisted. He continued to play in the VFL, playing for Sandringham from 2011 until 2013, and served as club captain in 2013.

In 2014, he crossed to Port Melbourne, and in 2015 he returned to Essendon as a VFL-listed player in its reserves team. He had the opportunity to return to the Essendon seniors during the 2015 NAB Challenge due to provisional suspensions being served by senior Essendon players during the club's supplements controversy. He was one of the best afield for Essendon in the 50-point defeat to St Kilda in the first NAB Challenge game.
