= Jarryd Allen =

Australian rules footballer (born 1988)

Personal information
- Born: 14 January 1988 (age 38)
- Original team: Calder Cannons (TAC Cup)
- Debut: Round 13, 20 June 2008, St Kilda vs. Fremantle, at Docklands
- Height: 193 cm (6 ft 4 in)
- Weight: 87 kg (192 lb)

Playing career^{1}
Years	Club	Games (Goals)
2008	St Kilda	4 (0)
- ^{1} Playing statistics correct to the end of 2008.

Career highlights
- St Kilda Pre-Season Cup winning side 2008

Jarryd Allen (born 14 January 1988) is a former Australian rules footballer for the AFL's St Kilda Football Club. He was drafted with the 59th selection by the Saints in the 2006 AFL draft from TAC Cup club, the Calder Cannons.

On the first of September 2009, he announced his retirement at St Kilda's best and fairest. In the first quarter of the 2008 Semi Final against Collingwood, he received a heavy knock to his hip, which required surgery. It was serious enough to sideline him for the entire 2009 season. After what seemed to be a successful rehabilitation, he had arthroscopy, which revealed he had lost too much cartilage in the hip. After 4 senior games, he retired choosing quality of life.

Jarryd is currently an assistant coach at St Mary's Salesian Amateur Football Club in the Victorian Amateur Football Association's Division 2 grade.

He was drafted at pick 49 in the 2010 Rookie draft to fulfill contractual obligations.
