= Ben Nason =

Australian rules footballer

Personal information
- Full name: Ben Nason
- Nickname: Naso
- Born: 3 June 1989 (age 37)
- Original team: Central District (SANFL)
- Draft: 71st overall, 2009 draft
- Height: 179 cm (5 ft 10 in)
- Weight: 73 kg (161 lb)
- Positions: Forward, midfielder

Playing career^{1}
Years	Club	Games (Goals)
2010–2011	Richmond	23 (17)
- ^{1} Playing statistics correct to the end of 2011.

Ben Nason (born 3 June 1989) is a former Australian rules footballer who played for the Richmond Football Club in the Australian Football League (AFL).

== Early life ==
Nason played under-17 and under-19 football for the Port Adelaide Magpies in the South Australian National Football League (SANFL). After being overlooked in the 2007 and 2008 AFL drafts, Nason moved to fellow SANFL club, Central District for the 2009 season, in an attempt to further his career. While playing for Central District, Nason also worked full-time with a fibreglass company. He played the majority of the year in Central's reserves team, although he did play two games in the senior team, kicking a goal in his first game. He finished 2009 having played 19 reserves games for a return of 29 goals, and was named as an emergency in Central's SANFL Grand Final team. Nason caught the eye of AFL recruiters when he was one of the best players in a practice match between South Australia's under-20 side and their under-18s team. He also recorded 14.2 on the beep test at the AFL Draft Camp.

== AFL career ==
=== Draft ===
After his 2009 season, Nason was the subject of interest for the 2009 AFL draft. Geelong, Port Adelaide, Fremantle and Richmond all showed interest in him, but Nason was not confident and "didn't think [he] would be drafted". Richmond ended up taking the slightly built youngster with the 71st selection in the draft.

=== 2010: Debut season ===
Nason played in Richmond's first pre-season match, against Hawthorn on 13 February, but suffered an injury, which caused him to be taken off the ground on a stretcher and a serious knee injury was feared. However, the diagnosis proved to be hyper-extension and bone bruising, which only resulted in Nason missing two weeks and he played Richmond's remaining two pre-season matches.

Nason made his AFL debut against Carlton in round 1, although he had not expected to make his debut so soon. He had 10 disposals and kicked a goal in an impressive performance. Nason has played nineteen games for the Tigers in season 2010 and was noted as one of Richmond's many exciting, young players. In a round 8 match against Hawthorn, Hawks captain Sam Mitchell was fined $900 for pulling Nason's hair. He became a cult figure at Richmond, well known for his blond dreadlocks.

He was delisted at the conclusion of the 2011 season, aged 22.
