= Ryan Neates =

Australian rules footballer (born 1991)

Personal information
- Full name: Ryan Paul Neates
- Born: 21 June 1991 (age 35); Perth, Western Australia
- Original team: Carine JFC
- Draft: 5th pick, 2010 Pre-season draft
- Height: 169 cm (5 ft 7 in)
- Weight: 69 kg (152 lb)
- Positions: Small forward, midfielder

Playing career^{1}
Years	Club	Games (Goals)
2010–14	Claremont (WAFL)	49 (35)
2012	West Coast	1 (0)

Representative team honours
Years	Team	Games (Goals)
2013	Western Australia	1 (0)
- ^{1} Playing statistics correct to the end of round 10, 2014.

Career highlights
- Western Australia under-18 team 2009; Claremont colts premiership 2009

Ryan Paul Neates (born 21 June 1991) is an Australian rules footballer currently listed with the Claremont Football Club in the West Australian Football League (WAFL), having previously played with the West Coast Eagles in the Australian Football League (AFL). From Perth, Western Australia, Neates represented his state at the 2009 National Under-18 Championships, and debuted for Claremont at the senior level the following season, before being drafted with the fifth pick in the 2010 AFL Pre-season draft. For a period the shortest player on an AFL list, Neates played his first and only senior game for West Coast in round seven of the 2012 season, having missed the entire 2011 season due to injury. He was delisted by West Coast at the end of the 2012 season, but continues to play last man’s stands cricket in London, captaining the White Mitsubishis.

== Career ==
Neates grew up in Carine, a northern suburb of Perth, Western Australia. He played junior football for the Carine Junior Football Club, and attended Sacred Heart College, where he played in the school team that won the Belt Up Cup, a knockout competition for schools, in 2008, along with future West Coast teammate Jack Darling and other notable alumni such as Jonathon Wilson. Neates had earlier been chosen for state under-15 and under-16 representative teams, but was restricted to playing only for his school in 2008 after tearing his hamstring off the bone the previous season. Falling into the Claremont Football Club's recruitment zone, he made his debut in the club's colts (under-19) team in round one of the 2009 season, recording 24 disposals against Subiaco, and later played in the colts premiership team. He also represented Western Australia at the 2009 National Under-18 Championships, playing four games and averaging 15 disposals. At screenings prior to the 2009 AFL draft, held at the conclusion of the 2009 season, he ran the 20-metre sprint in 2.83 seconds, the second-fastest of any player Australia-wide. After being overlooked in the 2009 National draft, Neates was recruited by the West Coast Eagles with the club's only pick, the fifth pick overall, in the 2010 Pre-season draft, largely as a result of his performances in pre-draft testing. At the time of his drafting, Neates was the second-shortest player in the AFL, behind Lewis Broome, was also drafted by West Coast at the 2010 Rookie draft. After Broome was delisted at the end of the 2011 season, Neates became the shortest player on an AFL list, standing three centimetres shorter than North Melbourne's Matt Campbell.

Neates began the 2010 season playing reserves matches for Claremont, but missed much of the early part of the season due to shoulder and finger injuries. He made his senior debut for Claremont against East Perth in round 14 of the 2010 season, kicking two goals and recording 21 disposals. Neates played in every one of the club's games for the rest of the season, mainly as an inside midfielder or half-forward flanker, including the loss to Swan Districts in the 2010 Grand Final. Neates played his first games for West Coast in the 2011 NAB Cup, the pre-season competition prior to the start of the 2011 season. He pulled up sore after West Coast's semi-final loss to Collingwood, and the decision was later made to operate on a hernia, causing him to miss the first eleven weeks of the season. Neates returned via the Claremont reserves, but dislocated an elbow the following week at training, causing him to miss the remainder of the season. After a strong pre-season, Neates returned via the 2012 NAB Cup. He returned to Claremont in round one of the WAFL season, recording 24 disposals against East Perth. A string of strong WAFL and Foxtel Cup performances, in which Neates kicked 14 goals in seven games, including four against West Perth, led Neates to be considered to make his senior debut for West Coast after injuries to other small forwards. He was named as an emergency for the club's game against Greater Western Sydney in round three, but did not play, and was named in West Coast's squad to play against Essendon in round seven, after Ashton Hams was suspended for two matches. Neates made his debut for West Coast against Essendon as a substitute, recording five disposals after replacing Matt Priddis on the field. He did not retain his place in West Coast's side the following week, and was delisted at the end of the season. Standing 169 cm (5 ft 6½ in), Neates remains the shortest player to play a senior game for West Coast, ahead of brothers Wally (170 cm) and Phillip Matera (171 cm).

== Playing style ==
Neates usually plays as either a small forward or across the half-forward flank. In junior football, he often played as an inside midfielder, but his short stature has restricted the likelihood of him playing on-ball in higher-level matches. His height was also considered a factor in him being drafted in the Pre-season Draft, rather than in the National Draft. In assessments before his drafting, Neates' strengths were described as his "clearance work and ability to bring teammates into the game", with his "good turn of pace" also being noted. After the draft, West Coast's recruiting manager Trevor Woodhouse compared Neates to Fremantle's Hayden Ballantyne in terms of his pace and tackling inside the forward 50, describing him as "little, but very quick and a hard runner", and as a "pretty good tackler for his size".
