= Michael Talia =

Australian rules footballer (born 1993)

Personal information
- Full name: Michael Talia
- Born: 11 February 1993 (age 33)
- Original team: Greenvale/Calder Cannons (TAC Cup)
- Draft: No. 39, 2011 national draft
- Height: 194 cm (6 ft 4 in)
- Weight: 94 kg (207 lb)
- Position: Defender

Playing career^{1}
Years	Club	Games (Goals)
2012–2015	Western Bulldogs	30 (2)
2016–2017	Sydney	1 (0)
Total		31 (2)
- ^{1} Playing statistics correct to the end of 2017.

Career highlights
- 2013 AFL Rising Star nominee

Michael Talia (born 11 February 1993) is a former professional Australian rules footballer who played for the Western Bulldogs and Sydney Swans in the Australian Football League (AFL). He is the brother of Daniel Talia. Michael is the grandson of Harvey Stevens, a former Footscray player leading the club to their first premiership in 1954. His great-grandfather, Arthur Stevens, also played for Footscray.

He played junior football for Greenvale in the Essendon District Football League and attended Assumption College in Kilmore.

Talia was recruited by the Western Bulldogs in the 2011 national draft with pick 39 and made his debut in round 19, 2012, against North Melbourne at Etihad Stadium. He earned the round 15 nomination for the 2013 AFL Rising Star after a 32-possession game against Greater Western Sydney.

In October 2015, he was traded to Sydney amidst allegations of passing information before the elimination final against the Adelaide Crows a month earlier, in which his brother was playing for the opposition, the AFL would later clear both brothers of wrongdoing. In round 1, his first game for the Swans, he suffered a Lisfranc ligament injury in the last quarter against Collingwood, ruling him out for the next eight to twelve weeks. Dane Swan also suffered the same injury, as well as multiple fractures in his foot and lower leg. Complications with the injury saw him placed on the long-term injury list.

In July 2016, Talia was arrested and charged with possession of cocaine and he later pleaded guilty to the charges and was placed on a twelve-month good behaviour bond.

Talia was delisted at the conclusion of the 2017 season.

== Statistics ==
Statistics are correct to the end of the 2017 season

Legend
G	Goals	K	Kicks	D	Disposals	T	Tackles
B	Behinds	H	Handballs	M	Marks

Season	Team	No.	Games	Totals							Averages (per game)						
Season	Team	No.	Games	G	B	K	H	D	M	T	G	B	K	H	D	M	T
2012	Western Bulldogs	32	4	1	0	30	24	54	18	4	0.3	0.0	7.5	6.0	13.5	4.5	1.0
2013	Western Bulldogs	32	9	0	0	92	82	174	40	11	0.0	0.0	10.2	9.1	19.3	4.4	1.2
2014	Western Bulldogs	32	3	0	0	18	18	36	10	1	0.0	0.0	6.0	6.0	12.0	3.3	0.3
2015	Western Bulldogs	32	14	2	1	126	109	235	82	19	0.1	0.1	9.0	7.8	16.8	5.9	1.4
2016	Sydney	32	1	0	0	7	3	10	3	1	0.0	0.0	7.0	3.0	10.0	3.0	1.0
Career			31	3	1	273	236	509	153	36	0.1	0.0	8.8	7.6	16.4	4.9	1.2
