= AFL Sapphire Coast =

Australian rules football competition

The Sapphire Coast Australian Football League is an Australian rules football competition in the Sapphire Coast region of New South Wales, Australia. The league was formed in 1984. The Far South Coast lies in the feeder area for the GWS club and AFL Hall of Fame member and four time premiership coach Kevin Sheedy assisted the representative team in 2014.

== Clubs ==
=== Locations ===
Locations of the AFL Sapphire Coast clubs. Clubs fielding senior sides are red, clubs fielding only junior sides are yellow.

=== Current ===
==== Senior ====
Club	Colours	Nickname	Home Ground	Est.	Years in SCAFL	SCAFL Senior Premierships	
Club	Colours	Nickname	Home Ground	Est.	Years in SCAFL	Total	Years
Bega-Tathra		Kangaroos	Lawrence Park Oval, Tathra and Roy Howard Oval, Bega	2025	2025-	0	-
Bermagui		Breakers	Dickinson Oval, Bermagui	1990	1990-1994, 2009-	0	-
Eden		Whalers	Barclay Street Oval, Eden	1983	1984-	0	-
Merimbula Diggers (Note: Known as Merimbula RSL Diggers until the end of the 1989 season)		Diggers	Berrambool Sporting Complex, Merimbula	1983	1984-	8	1995, 1997, 1998, 2009, 2019, 2020, 2024, 2025
Narooma		Lions	Bill Smyth Memorial Oval, Narooma	1983	1984-	5	1985, 1986, 2018, 2022, 2023
Pambula		Panthers	Pambula Sporting Complex, Pambula	1983	1984-	5	1984, 2006, 2014, 2015, 2017

==== Juniors only ====
Club	Colours	Nickname	Home Ground	Est.	Years in SCAFL
Batemans Bay		Seahawks	Hanging Rock Sports Grounds, Batemans Bay	1976	1989-1992, 1995-

=== Former ===
Club	Colours	Nickname	Home Ground	Former League	Est.	Years in SCAFL	SCAFL Senior Premierships		Fate
Club	Colours	Nickname	Home Ground	Former League	Est.	Years in SCAFL	Total	Years	Fate
Batemans Bay	(1989-92)(1995-?)(?-2012)	Seahawks	Hanging Rock Sports Grounds, Batemans Bay	SCAFL, ACTAFL	1976	1989-1992, 1995-2012	5	1992, 2001, 2004, 2006, 2007	Moved to AFL Canberra following 1992 and 2012 seasons
Bega Valley		Bombers	Roy Howard Oval, Bega	–	2013	2013-2022	0	-	Senior team played merged with Tathra in 2023-24, merged with Tathra to form Bega-Tathra following 2024 season
Bega Wolumla		Wombats	Roy Howard Oval, Bega	–	1984	1984-1988	0	-	Folded after 1988 season
Broulee Moruya		Giants	Hanging Rock Sports Grounds, Batemans Bay	–	2014	2014-2023	0	-	Folded after 2023 season
Cooma		Cats	Snowy Oval, Cooma	MAFL	1975	1986-1989	0	-	Moved to AFL Canberra following 1989 season
Merimbula Marlins		Marlins	Berrambool Sporting Complex, Merimbula	–	1984	1984-2006	7	1987, 1989, 1990, 1994, 1999, 2000, 2002	Folded after 2006 season
Mallacoota/Cann River (Mallacoota 1986-88)	(1986-88)(1989-93)	Tiger Sharks	Lions Park, Mallacoota	–	1986	1986-1989, 1991-1993	0	-	Recess in 1991. Folded after 1993 season
Tathra		Sea Eagles	Lawrence Park Oval, Tathra	–	1984	1984-2024	11	1988, 1991, 1993, 1996, 2003, 2005, 2010, 2011, 2012, 2013, 2016	Merged with Bega Valley to form Bega-Tathra following 2024 season
Wyndham		Wedgies	Wyndham Recreation Ground, Wyndham	–	1984	1984-1995	0	-	Merged with Pambula following 1995 season

Bega and Tathra fielded a combined side for the 2016 season, although the clubs did not merge.

== Premiers ==
Year	Premiers	Year	Premiers	Year	Premiers	Year	Premiers	Year	Premiers
1984	Pambula	1994	Merimbula Marlins	2004	Batemans Bay	2014	Pambula	2024	Merimbula
1985	Narooma	1995	Merimbula Diggers	2005	Tathra	2015	Pambula	2025	Merimbula
1986	Narooma	1996	Tathra	2006	Pambula	2016	Tathra	2026	
1987	Merimbula Marlins	1997	Merimbula Diggers	2007	Batemans Bay	2017	Pambula	2027	
1988	Tathra	1998	Merimbula Diggers	2008	Batemans Bay	2018	Narooma	2028	
1989	Merimbula Marlins	1999	Merimbula Marlins	2009	Merimbula Diggers	2019	Merimbula	2029	
1990	Merimbula Marlins	2000	Merimbula Marlins	2010	Tathra	2020	Merimbula	2030	
1991	Tathra	2001	Batemans Bay	2011	Tathra	2021	No Premier due to COVID-19	2031	
1992	Batemans Bay	2002	Merimbula Marlins	2012	Tathra	2022	Narooma	2032	
1993	Tathra	2003	Tathra	2013	Tathra	2023	Narooma	2033	

== 2015 Ladder ==
Sapphire Coast	Wins	Byes	Losses	Draws	For	Against	%	Pts	Final	Team	G	B	Pts	Team	G	B	Pts
Pambula	15	2	0	0	2533	593	427.15%	68	1st Semi	Tathra	16	10	106	Bega	5	11	41
Merimbula	12	2	3	0	2017	840	240.12%	56	2nd Semi	Pambula	8	7	55	Merimbula	6	13	49
Bermagui	3	2	12	0	821	1897	43.28%	20	Preliminary	Merimbula	12	12	84	Tathra	8	10	58
Tathra	7	2	8	0	1584	1602	98.88%	36	Grand	Pambula	24	22	166	Merimbula	8	12	60
Bega	5	2	10	0	1187	1678	70.74%	28									
Narooma	3	2	12	0	853	2385	35.77%	20									

== 2016 Ladder ==
Sapphire Coast	Wins	Byes	Losses	Draws	For	Against	%	Pts	Final	Team	G	B	Pts	Team	G	B	Pts
Tathra	12	0	0	0	1941	449	432.29%	48	1st Semi	Pambula	15	12	102	Narooma	11	13	79
Merimbula	8	0	3	0	1365	661	206.51%	32	2nd Semi	Tathra	14	9	93	Merimbula	7	15	57
Pambula	8	0	4	0	1294	859	150.64%	32	Preliminary	Merimbula	14	12	96	Pambula	8	11	59
Narooma	6	0	6	0	1095	1088	100.64%	24	Grand	Tathra	16	9	105	Merimbula	6	6	42
Bermagui	1	0	11	0	550	1573	34.97%	4									
Eden	1	0	11	0	461	2076	22.21%	4									

== 2017 Ladder ==
Sapphire Coast	Wins	Byes	Losses	Draws	For	Against	%	Pts	Final	Team	G	B	Pts	Team	G	B	Pts
Narooma	14	0	1	0	1768	825	214.30%	56	1st Semi	Tathra	15	14	104	Bermagui	14	14	98
Pambula	12	0	3	0	1574	662	237.76%	48	2nd Semi	Narooma	15	9	99	Pambula	14	8	92
Tathra	9	0	6	0	1659	1207	137.45%	36	Preliminary	Pambula	16	7	103	Tathra	7	6	48
Bermagui	7	0	8	0	1168	1199	97.41%	28	Grand	Pambula	17	15	117	Narooma	7	8	50
Merimbula	3	0	12	0	988	1381	71.54%	12									
Eden	0	0	15	0	477	2360	20.21%	0									

== 2018 Ladder ==
Sapphire Coast	Wins	Byes	Losses	Draws	For	Against	%	Pts	Final	Team	G	B	Pts	Team	G	B	Pts
Narooma	12	0	1	0	1515	707	214.29%	48	1st Semi	Pambula	17	15	117	Tathra	9	7	61
Merimbula	9	0	3	0	890	582	152.92%	36	2nd Semi	Narooma	21	10	136	Merimbula	15	10	100
Pambula	6	0	7	0	894	942	94.90%	24	Preliminary	Merimbula	12	10	82	Pambula	10	7	67
Tathra	4	0	9	0	974	1059	91.97%	16	Grand	Narooma	13	6	84	Merimbula	6	9	45
Eden	1	0	12	0	470	1453	32.35%	4									

== 2019 Ladder ==
Sapphire Coast	Wins	Byes	Losses	Draws	For	Against	%	Pts	Final	Team	G	B	Pts	Team	G	B	Pts
Merimbula	9	0	3	0	1146	396	289.39%	36	1st Semi	Pambula	8	5	53	Narooma	6	6	42
Tathra	8	0	4	0	1045	640	163.28%	32	2nd Semi	Merimbula	12	10	82	Tathra	4	2	26
Pambula	8	0	4	0	917	661	138.73%	32	Preliminary	Tathra	13	4	82	Pambula	6	9	45
Narooma	5	0	7	0	892	793	112.48%	20	Grand	Merimbula	10	10	70	Tathra	7	4	46
Eden	0	0	12	0	210	1720	12.21%	0									

== See also ==
- Group 16 Rugby League
- AFL South Coast
- Football South Coast
- South Coast Open
