= Greenvale Football Club =

Greenvale

Names
- Full name: Greenvale Football Club
- Nickname(s): Jets, Jetters

Club details
- Founded: 1990
- Colours: Green and Black
- Competition: Essendon District Football League
- Chairperson: Bruce Kent (1995 – present)
- Coach: Anthony Rock (2026–)
- Captain: Matthew Stillman
- Premierships: 5 (2002, 2004, 2007, 2012, 2013)
- Grounds: Greenvale Reserve No. 1 Oval (Seniors & Juniors), Greenvale, Victoria
- Greenvale Reserve No. 2 Oval (Juniors), Greenvale, Victoria
- Greenvale Reserve No. 4 Oval (Juniors), Greenvale, Victoria

Other information
- Official website: www.greenvalefc.com.au

The Greenvale Football Club is an Australian rules football club 23 km north-west of Melbourne in the suburb of Greenvale. The club was founded in 1990 as a junior club by Les Norris. By 2005, the club was fielding fifteen teams in the Essendon District Football League.

== History ==
Greenvale Football club started in 1990 as a junior club by Les Norris, who died in April 2009. In 1996 Greenvale fielded a senior side for the first time in Essendon DFL B Grade. Greenvale has only been in operation as a senior club for a little over a decade, but already it has established itself as a force to be reckoned with in the powerful Essendon District Football League. Their first premiership came in B Grade in 2002. Greenvale has won 5 senior premierships since the club was first founded. In 2004 Greenvale had finished at the head of the ladder prior to the finals, and went on to win their first A Grade premiership. They finished on top again in 2005 before reaching a second successive premiership play-off after an impressive 2nd semi final demolition of Keilor. The grand final turned into a nightmare, however, as rank outsiders Strathmore stole both the show and the flag with a hard-earned and well-deserved 10 point win. By 2005, the club was fielding fifteen teams in the Essendon District Football League.

The 2006 season saw a slight drop in performance level, and Greenvale's premiership aspirations were ended by Doutta Stars on preliminary final day. With former Australian rules players Steve MacPherson and Steve Paxman as senior coach and captain respectively Greenvale has plenty of experience to draw on, and it was no surprise to see them emerge as pace setters in 2007. What was a surprise, however, was the extent of their dominance, for after topping the ladder with 100% success from 18 home and away matches, they swept to an unbeaten premiership on the strength of wins over Strathmore by 57 points in the 2nd semi final and 3 goals in the grand final. The reserves also went top, making it a perfect year all round. In 2008 the club went undefeated, until the Grand Final losing to Keilor 20.12.(132) to 15.9.(99).

As of 2009 – Steve MacPherson was the longest serving coach of any side in the EDFL until he announced he was leaving the club at the end of the 2010 season.

2011 saw Anthony Rock take over as senior coach. Greenvale finished the season in third position and faced Maribynong Park in the elimination final. Greenvale steamed to a commanding victory. Greenvale faced Strathmore in the preliminary final and went on to lose to the grand final winners by 22 points.

2012 saw Greenvale retain Anthony Rock as coach and recruit several players mainly Eric Kuret and Daniel Campisano. Greenvale finished a successful season in second position.

Greenvale went on to win the 2012 premiership by 2 points (82-80) after trailing by as much as 24 points deep in third term and 17 points at 3/4 time. This was due to a huge influence by Greenvale colt hero Jacob Thompson booting 2 majors in the final term to secure the win, very stiff to miss out on best on ground honors.

Season 2013 greenvale finished on top with a 16–2 record in the home and away season.

Greenvale lost the first final convincingly 12.22 (94) to 8.11 (59) to Aberfeldie and played beat Airport West in the preliminary final by 58 points.

In the grand final, Greenvale was down by 6 points at half time. In a big 3rd quarter, Greenvale kicked 5 goals to 3 to open up a 10-point lead. Greenvale ran out winners by 14 points, with Eric Kuret named best on ground.

== Season 2009 ==
In the 2009 season the club started a 2nd under 18's team in the Essendon District Football League. The club went undefeated in the home and away season, before losing the semi-final to Maribyrnong Park and the Grand Final also to Maribyrnong Park 14.18.(102) to 13.6.(84). The club also started construction on the 2nd oval and the up grading of the lights on the main oval.

== Season 2010 ==
The club began its 2010 pre-season campaign on Monday the 16 November 2009 at Greenvale Reserve. In December 2009 it was named that ex-essendon AFL player Scott Lucas (footballer) would be playing for Greenvale in the 2010 season and he has proved to be a wonderful asset. The club has a total of 18 teams in the league this year, making it the most that the club has ever had and the club is growing each day. The Seniors lost their 1st game in 3 years in a home and away season in Round 6 to Oak Park 15.19.(109) to Greenvale 6.11.(47). The Seniors, Reserves and the Under 18 Div 1 teams all subsequently finished on top of their respective ladders and into the 2010 EDFL Finals. This was the first time in years that all 3 teams have made it into the finals together. The Seniors, Reserves and the Under 18 Div 1 teams all eventually played off in Grand Finals on 12 September 2010 at Essendon's Windy Hill Football Ground. Both the U18s and Reserves were victorious in their matches defeating Keilor Football Club in both instances, with the flagship A-Grade team losing in a close match to reigning back to back premiers Maribyrnong Park, coached by ex-AFL player Brodie Holland.

Greenvale's tenacity helped them get to within five points in an exciting final quarter only for Maribyrnong Park to kick two goals in the dying final minutes. The final score during the A-Grade match was Maribyrnong Park 12.18 (90) def. Greenvale 10.13 (73).

In October 2010 – After 7 years as coach of the senior side Steve MacPherson announced he won't continue as head coach in 2011 and he will be leaving the club altogether. Steve Paxman and club captain Denis Bicer has also announced they will not be returning to the club on 2011, Bicer has taken up an assistant-coaching role with B Grade club Pascoe Vale

== Season 2011 ==
In October 2010 – It was announced that ex-AFL North Melbourne player Anthony Rock was appointed as the new Head Senior coach for season 2011 and now continues this in 2012.

The club began its 2012 pre-season campaign in November 2011 under returning Coach Anthony Rock.

== Season 2012 ==
Greenvale confirmed the signings of two key players for 2012. Eric Kuret returned from a spell at Balranald and Daniel Campisano from Frankston VFL. The squad was further strengthened with some up and coming talent from the under 18s.

Greenvale had an almost perfect year only losing two games to Strathmore who had not list a game from the preliminary final 2011.

On the eve of the finals Greenvale lost two of its key players Travis Jorgenson and Dean Smith and there were injury clouds under a number of other stars. In the first final, Greenvale lost to Strathmore by 9 points however felt as though they were the better finishing team. In the preliminary Greenvale accounted for Maribynong park fairly comfortably.

Greenvale then faced unbeaten Strathmore in the 2012 grand final. Strathmore were heavy favorites and were odds on $1.60 to win the premiership. Greenvale looked gone through the third quarter but dug deep on the back of Jacob Thompson and Matthew Smith heroics, the Jets won by 2 points. Rowan Nanya was voted best aground to win the medal.

Greenvale reserves also beat Strathmore making it a clean sweep for the senior squad.

== Senior teams ==
Senior teams for 2026 –

- Senior Premier Division
- Reserves Premier Division
- Thirds North Division
- Under 18.5 Premier Division

== Junior teams ==
Junior teams for 2015 -

- Under 14 Division 1
- Under 12 Division 1
- Under 10 Division 1
- Under 16 Division 2
- Under 14 Division 4
- Under 12 Division 4
- Under 10 Division 4
- Under 16 Division 5
- Under 12 Division 7
- Under 10 Division 7
- Under 12 Division 8
- Under 10 Division 8
- Under 8

== Premier Division ==
- 2004 – win over Oak Park 17.18.(120) to 10.17.(77)
- 2007 – win over Strathmore 17.14.(116) to 14.14.(98)
- 2012 – win over Strathmore 12.10.(82) to 11.14.(80)
- 2013 – win over Aberfeldie 12.14 (86) to 10.12 (72)

== Division 1 ==
- 2002 – win over Tullamarine 16.9.(105) to 11.9.(75)

== VFL/TAC/AFL Recruited by the 'Jets ==
- Stephen MacPherson (Senior Coach 2003–2010) – Western Bulldogs
- Anthony Rock (Senior Coach 2011 – ) – North Melbourne & Hawthorn Football Club
- Scott Lucas – Essendon
- Cameron Wight – Western Bulldogs
- Stephen Paxman – Port Adelaide
- Chris Johnson – Melbourne Football Club & Carlton Football Club
- Rowan Nayna – Port Melbourne Football Club & Western Bulldogs
- Matthew Smith – Port Melbourne
- Anthony Aloi – Port Melbourne
- Denis Bicer – Coburg Tigers
- Vincent Randello – Coburg Tigers
- Eric Kuret – Coburg Tigers
- Sedat Sir – Williamstown Western Bulldogs
- Travis Jorgenson – Coburg Tigers
- Daniel Campisano – Frankston Dolphins VFL

== VFL/AFL Recruited from the 'Jets ==
- Ben "Buckets" Clifton – Hawthorn
- Addam Maric – Melbourne, Richmond & Werribee
- Daniel Talia – Adelaide
- Dion Prestia – Gold Coast & Richmond
- Michael Talia – Western Bulldogs
- Rhys Bloomfield – Port Melbourne
- Dean Smith – Coburg Tigers
- David "Max" Kovacevic – Werribee
- Ozgur Uysal – Coburg Tigers
- Nick Maric – Coburg Tigers & Werribee
- Damien Bugeja – Williamstown Seagulls
- Hayden "Gold Digger" Farrelly – Northern Blues
- Julian Hemala – Coburg Football Club
- Jacob "Thighs" Thompson - Essendon Football Club
- Nick "Big Sexy" Parthenopolous - Port Melbourne Football Club
