= Troy Taylor (Australian footballer) =

Australian rules footballer (born 1991)

Personal information
- Full name: Troy Taylor
- Born: 12 September 1991 (age 35); Alice Springs
- Original team: South Alice Springs (CAFL)
- Draft: No. 51, 2009 National Draft, Richmond
- Height: 192 cm (6 ft 4 in)
- Weight: 83 kg (183 lb)
- Position: Forward

Playing career^{1}
Years	Club	Games (Goals)
2010	Richmond	4 (3)
- ^{1} Playing statistics correct to the end of 2011.

Troy Taylor (b. 12 September 1991) is an Australian rules footballer who played for Richmond in the Australian Football League (AFL).

Originally from Central Australian Football League (CAFL) club South Alice Springs, Taylor was a talented junior footballer who had piqued the interest of Gold Coast Suns Football Club, who sought to name Taylor in their training squad in the lead up to their debut in the 2011 AFL season. Taylor declines and instead nominated for the 2009 AFL draft, where Richmond drafted him with their fourth round pick (number 51 overall).

Taylor made his senior AFL debut against Melbourne in round 4 of the 2010 season but continually suffered homesickness, twice walking out on Richmond and their Victorian Football League (VFL) affiliate Coburg Football Club. Taylor did not return to Richmond for the 2011 season and was delisted by the club at the end of the year.

Taylor was recruited for the 2012 season by Walla Walla Football Club in the southern New South Wales based Hume Football League but after starring in the first few rounds, did not return to the club after a trip back to Alice Springs to visit his family.
