= Robert Hicks (Australian footballer) =

Australian rules footballer

Personal information
- Full name: Robert Hicks
- Born: 9 October 1991 (age 35)
- Original team: Calder Cannons
- Draft: 7th overall, 2010 Rookie draft Richmond
- Height: 176 cm (5 ft 9 in)
- Weight: 70 kg (154 lb)
- Position: Half forward flank/Forward pocket

Playing career^{1}
Years	Club	Games (Goals)
2010–2011	Richmond	3 (1)
- ^{1} Playing statistics correct to the end of 2011.

Robert Hicks (born 9 October 1991) is an Australian rules footballer who played for the Richmond Football Club in the Australian Football League (AFL).

Hicks was drafted to Richmond from the Calder Cannons in the TAC Cup with the 7th selection in the 2010 Rookie draft.
