= North Dalton Park =

Sports ground in Wollongong, Australia

- Dalton Park
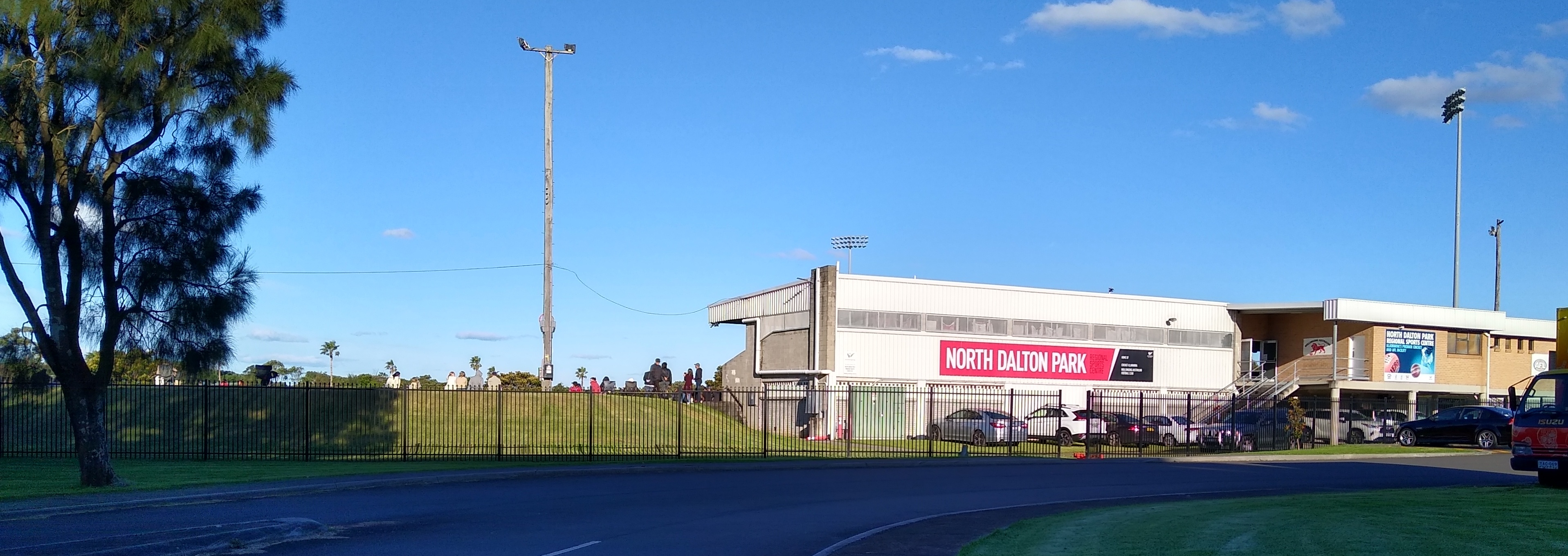
- Interactive map of North Dalton Park
- Location: Towradgi, Wollongong
- Country: Australia
- Coordinates: 34°23′29″S 150°54′17″E=
- Capacity: 5,430
- Owner: Wollongong City Council
- Operator: Wollongong City Council
- Tenants: New South Wales Cricket Association; Wollongong Lions AFL; Wollongong Lions Junior AFL; AFL NSW/ACT Game Development; AFL South Coast Operations

North Dalton Park is located on Pioneer Rd, Towradgi, in the northern suburbs of Wollongong, New South Wales, Australia.

The ground has a grandstand on the western side, where 430 plastic bucket seats were installed over the concrete steps in early 2017. The remainder of the ground is surrounded by a small hill which gives the ground an overall capacity of around 5,430. The LED scoreboard is at the northern end of the ground. From the eastern hill, the ground has views of the mountain backdrop. The ground was re-surfaced in 2007, and broadcast quality floodlights were installed.

The ground is home to the Wollongong Lions in the AFL South Coast competition and the Wollongong Lions Junior AFL Club. The venue is also the home of Cricket Illawarra.

An interstate Ford Ranger Cup match was scheduled there on Sunday 9 December 2007, but rain in the days leading up to the match led to the game being abandoned without a ball bowled.

North Dalton Park is the main ground of Thomas Dalton Park Regional Sports Centre.

North Dalton Park is the main AFL/Cricket venue in the Illawarra Region.

== Events ==
On 12 Dec, 1995, the ground featured a match between the touring West Indies and the Australian Cricket Academy. The Academy side featured players like Mike Hussey, Matthew Nicholson, Mark Harrity, Corey Richards and Matthew Mott. The West Indies were dismissed for just 92 runs in 33.5 overs. The Academy side chased down the runs in 28.4 overs losing just 2 wickets.

The ground hosted a Ford Ranger Cup match on 26 January 2010 between NSW vs South Australia, drawing 2,909 spectators. Tickets for this match were $15 for Adults, $10 for Concession, $5 for kids and $35 for a family.

In July 2014 North Dalton Park hosted a game between the Ainslie Football Club and the Sydney Swans Reserves as part of the North East Australian Football League(NEAFL).

North Dalton Park hosted a Toyota Futures League match between NSW (2nd XI) and ACT in November 2016.

On 27 December 2016 an electronic scoreboard was installed at North Dalton Park in time for the Australian Country Cricket Championships which Wollongong was hosting from 2–11 January 2017.

In February 2017 North Dalton Park hosted a Sheffield Shield match between NSW Blues and Tasmania Tigers.

In the weeks leading up to the Sheffield Shield match new seats were installed in the grandstand bringing the grandstand seating capacity from 280 to 430. New sight screens were also installed.

On day 1 of the Sheffield Shield match a crowd of 1,082 attended, Day 2 produced a crowd of 1,405, Day 3 saw 448 people come through the gates and in the rained-out Day 4 an estimated 50 People attended. Entry for this match was a gold coin donation supporting Cricket Illawarra. Free Programs were given out by Illawarra Junior cricketers at the Southern Gate. Food stalls were located in the Family Zone in the South-East corner of the venue as well as a bar in the Alcohol Zone at the northern end of the grandstand.

On 12 December 2017, the Sydney Sixers hosted Perth Scorchers in a WBBL match. This took place at 12pm, preceding a BBL trial match between Sydney Sixers and Hobart Hurricanes at 4:30pm. Entry for this match was a gold coin donation with many free giveaways and activities around the ground. The crowd for the WBBL peaked at 1,222 and the BBL attracted a record crowd of 4,371.

In March 2018, NSW Blues will host QLD Bulls in round 10 of the Sheffield Shield.

== Transport ==
The ground is a 14-minute walk from Fairy Meadow train station and a 23-minute walk from Towradgi station.
