= AFL South Coast =

Australian rules football competition

South Coast Australian Football League
- Sport: Australian rules football
- Founded: 1969
- No. of teams: 9
- Country: Australia
- Most recent champions: Premier Division 2025; Figtree - Mens; Figtree - Womens; Reserve Grade 2025; Bay and Basin - Men; Wollongong - Women
- Most titles: Albatross (13)

The AFL South Coast is an Australian rules football competition in the Shoalhaven and Illawarra regions of New South Wales. The AFLSC has two divisions of senior men's football and senior women's football. In 2012 The South Coast AFL became "AFL South Coast" incorporating the three leagues of South Coast AFL Seniors, Shoalhaven Juniors and Illawarra Juniors.

The competition is technically South Coast's division of the New South Wales Australian Football League.

== History ==
The South Coast AFL was formed in 1969, composed of players from the military bases of HMAS Albatross, HMAS Creswell, and the cities of Nowra and Wollongong. In 1970 the Bomaderry club was formed and in 1972 Dapto joined the competition.

In 1975, Wollongong and Dapto left the league to create the Illawarra Australian Football League. They were joined by Bulli-Woonona (now known as Northern Districts), Port Kembla and Shellharbour, three clubs who had run junior programs but were introducing senior football. The sixth foundation club of the senior league was the University of Wollongong.

In 1988, the Wollongong Lions moving to the Sydney Football League causing the league to disband and the remaining clubs joining the South Coast AFL, which was renamed the Leisure Coast Australian Football League. The league returned to the name "South Coast AFL" in 2002.

In 2012 The South Coast AFL became "AFL South Coast" incorporating the three leagues of South Coast AFL Seniors, Shoalhaven Juniors and Illawarra Juniors.

== Clubs ==
=== Locations ===
Locations of the AFL South Coast clubs. Red clubs field senior teams, yellow reserves only and green juniors only

Teams are listed by their highest grade.

=== Men ===
==== Premier ====
Club	Colours	Nickname	Home Ground	Former League	Est.	Years in SCAFL	SCAFL Premierships		
Club	Colours	Nickname	Home Ground	Former League	Est.	Years in SCAFL	Seniors		Reserves
Club	Colours	Nickname	Home Ground	Former League	Est.	Years in SCAFL	Total	Premierships	Premierships
Bomaderry		Tigers	Royal Artie Smith Oval, Bomaderry	–	1969	1970-	8	1989, 1994, 2000, 2004, 2006, 2007, 2008, 2010	2018
Figtree		Kangaroos	Figtree Oval, Figtree	–	1999	2010-	4	2020, 2022, 2023, 2025	2015, 2020, 2024
Kiama		Power	Bonaira Playing Field, Kiama	–	1999	2002-	3	2009, 2011, 2018	2009, 2017
Northern Districts (Bulli-Woonona 1988-?)		Tigers	Hollymount Park, Woonona	IAFL	1971	1988-	0	-	-
Shellharbour City		Suns	Myimbarr Community Park, Shellharbour	–	2011	2011-	0	-	-
Wollongong		Bulldogs	Keira Oval, Mount Keira	–	2008	2008-	5	2012, 2013, 2014, 2015, 2024	2016, 2019, 2022, 2023
Wollongong		Lions	North Dalton Park, Fairy Meadows	SAFL	1966	1971-1974, 2015-	5	1969, 1970, 2015, 2016, 2019	-

==== Reserves ====
Club	Colours	Nickname	Home Ground	Former League	Est.	Years in SCAFL	SCAFL Premierships		
Club	Colours	Nickname	Home Ground	Former League	Est.	Years in SCAFL	Seniors		Reserves
Club	Colours	Nickname	Home Ground	Former League	Est.	Years in SCAFL	Total	Premierships	Premierships
Bay & Basin		Bombers	Bay & Basin Leisure Centre, Vincentia	–	1999	2019, 2023-	1	2025	2025
Bomaderry		Tigers	Royal Artie Smith Oval, Bomaderry	–	1969	1970-	8	1989, 1994, 2000, 2004, 2006, 2007, 2008, 2010	2018
Figtree A		Kangaroos	Figtree Oval, Figtree	–	1999	2010-	4	2020, 2022, 2023, 2025	2015, 2020, 2024
Figtree B		Kangaroos	Figtree Oval, Figtree	–	1999	2010-	4	2020, 2022, 2023, 2025	2015, 2020, 2024
Kiama		Power	Bonaira Playing Field, Kiama	–	1999	2002-	3	2009, 2011, 2018	2009, 2017
Northern Districts (Bulli-Woonona 1988-?)		Tigers	Hollymount Park, Woonona	IAFL	1971	1988-	0	-	-
Port Kembla		Blacks	Kully Bay Oval, Warrawong	IAFL	1966	1989-	2	1993, 1999	-
Shellharbour City		Suns	Myimbarr Community Park, Shellharbour	–	2011	2011-	0	-	-
Wollongong		Bulldogs	Keira Oval, Mount Keira	–	2008	2008-	5	2012, 2013, 2014, 2015, 2024	2016, 2019, 2022, 2023
Wollongong		Lions	North Dalton Park, Fairy Meadows	SAFL	1966	1971-1974, 2015-	5	1969, 1970, 2015, 2016, 2019	-

=== Women ===
==== Premier ====
Club	Colours	Nickname	Home Ground	Former League	Est.	Years in SCAFL	SCAFL Premierships		
Club	Colours	Nickname	Home Ground	Former League	Est.	Years in SCAFL	Seniors		Reserves
Club	Colours	Nickname	Home Ground	Former League	Est.	Years in SCAFL	Total	Premierships	Premierships
Bomaderry		Tigers	Royal Artie Smith Oval, Bomaderry	–	1969	1970-	8	1989, 1994, 2000, 2004, 2006, 2007, 2008, 2010	2018
Figtree		Saints	Figtree Oval, Figtree	–	1999	2010-	4	2020, 2022, 2023, 2025	2015, 2020, 2024
Kiama		Power	Bonaira Playing Field, Kiama	–	1999	2002-	3	2009, 2011, 2018	2009, 2017
Wollongong		Bulldogs	Keira Oval, Mount Keira	–	2008	2008-	5	2012, 2013, 2014, 2015, 2024	2016, 2019, 2022, 2023
Wollongong		Lions	North Dalton Park, Fairy Meadows	SAFL	1966	1971-1974, 2015-	5	1969, 1970, 2015, 2016, 2019	-

==== Reserves ====
Club	Colours	Nickname	Home Ground	Former League	Est.	Years in SCAFL	SCAFL Premierships		
Club	Colours	Nickname	Home Ground	Former League	Est.	Years in SCAFL	Seniors		Reserves
Club	Colours	Nickname	Home Ground	Former League	Est.	Years in SCAFL	Total	Premierships	Premierships
Bay & Basin		Bombers	Bay & Basin Leisure Centre, Vincentia	–	1999	2019, 2023-	1	2025	2025
Bomaderry		Tigers	Royal Artie Smith Oval, Bomaderry	–	1969	1970-	8	1989, 1994, 2000, 2004, 2006, 2007, 2008, 2010	2018
Figtree		Saints	Figtree Oval, Figtree	–	1999	2010-	4	2020, 2022, 2023, 2025	2015, 2020, 2024
Kiama		Power	Bonaira Playing Field, Kiama	–	1999	2002-	3	2009, 2011, 2018	2009, 2017
Northern Districts (Bulli-Woonona 1988-?)		Tigers	Hollymount Park, Woonona	IAFL	1971	1988-	0	-	-
Port Kembla		Blacks	Kully Bay Oval, Warrawong	IAFL	1966	1989-	2	1993, 1999	
Wollongong		Bulldogs	Keira Oval, Mount Keira	–	2008	2008-	5	2012, 2013, 2014, 2015, 2024	2016, 2019, 2022, 2023
Wollongong		Lions	North Dalton Park, Fairy Meadows	SAFL	1966	1971-1974, 2015-	5	1969, 1970, 2015, 2016, 2019	-

=== Junior ===
Club	Colours	Nickname	Home Ground	Est.	Years in SCAFL
Albion Park		Crows	Croome Road Sporting Complex, Croom	2008	2008-
Bay & Basin		Bombers	Bay & Basin Leisure Centre, Vincentia		
Bomaderry		Tigers	Royal Artie Smith Oval, Bomaderry		
Figtree		Kangaroos	Figtree Oval, Figtree	1999	1999-
Kiama		Power	Bonaira Playing Field, Kiama		
Northern Districts (Bulli-Woonona 1988-?)		Tigers	Hollymount Park, Woonona		
Shellharbour		Swans	Myimbarr Community Park, Shellharbour	2005	2005-
Shoalhaven		Giants	West Street Oval, Nowra		?-present
Ulladulla		Dockers	Ulladulla Sports Park, Ulladulla	1980s	2009-
Wollongong		Lions	North Dalton Park, Fairy Meadows		

== Former Clubs ==
=== Senior Men ===
Club	Colours	Nickname	Home Ground	Former League	Est.	Years in SCAFL	SCAFL Senior Premierships		Fate
Club	Colours	Nickname	Home Ground	Former League	Est.	Years in SCAFL	Total	Premierships	Fate
Albatross		Demons	Tom Smith Oval, HMAS Albatross	–	1969	1969-2014	13	1971, 1972, 1975, 1978, 1979, 1983, 1984, 1990, 1991, 1992, 1995, 1996, 1997	Merged with Nowra to form Nowra Albatross after 2014 season
Albion Park		Crows	Croome Road Sporting Complex, Croom	–	2008	2019-2021	0	-	Senior team entered recess after 2021 season
Batemans Bay		Seahawks	Hanging Rock Sports Grounds, Batemans Bay	MAFL	1976	1980s-1988	4	1985, 1986, 1987, 1988	Moved to Sapphire Coast AFL following 1988 season
Camden		Cats	Fairfax Reserve, Harrington Park	SFA	1982	1996-2007	2	2003, 2005	Moved to AFL Sydney after 2007 season
Dapto		Hawks		IAFL	1972	1972-1974, 1989	0	-	Moved to Illawarra AFL following 1974 season. Folded after 1989 season
Dapto City		Stallions	Keira Oval, Mount Keira	–	2014	2015-2019	0	-	Folded after 2019 season
East Nowra				–	1980	1980-1987	1	1981	Folded after 1987 season
Goulburn-Bargo		Hawks				1997-1998	0	-	Folded after 1998 season
HMAS Creswell				–	1969	1969	0	-	Folded after 1969 season
Nowra		Blues	Nowra Showgrounds, Nowra	–	1969	1969-2014	9	1973, 1974, 1976, 1977, 1980, 1982, 1998, 2001, 2002	Merged with Albatross to form Nowra Albatross after 2014 season
Nowra-Albatross		Vikings	Nowra Showgrounds, Nowra	–	2015	2015-2023	0	-	Folded after 2023 season
Southern Highlands		Hawks	Loseby Park, Bowral	–	1998	1998-2021	Juniors only		Folded after 2021 season
Ulladulla		Dockers	Ulladulla Sports Park, Ulladulla	–	1980s	2009-2024	0	-	Senior team entered recess after 2024 season
Wollondilly		Knights	Hannaford Oval, Wilton	SAFL	1989	2008-2013	0	-	Moved to AFL Sydney following 2013 season

=== Senior Women ===
Club	Colours	Nickname	Home Ground	Former League	Est.	Years in SCAFL	SCAFL Senior Premierships		Fate
Club	Colours	Nickname	Home Ground	Former League	Est.	Years in SCAFL	Total	Premierships	Fate
Albion Park		Crows	Croome Road Sporting Complex, Croom	–	2008	2019, 2021	0	-	Senior team in recess since 2021 season
Dapto City		Unicorns	Fred Finch Park, Berkeley	–	2014	2019	0	-	Folded after 2019 season
Nowra-Albatross		Vikings	Nowra Showgrounds, Nowra	–	2015	2019-2020	0	-	Folded after 2023 season
Shellharbour City		Suns	Myimbarr Community Park, Shellharbour	–	2011	2019-2020	0	-	Senior team in recess since 2020 season
Ulladulla		Dockers	Ulladulla Sports Park, Ulladulla	–	1980s	2019, 2021	0	-	Senior team in recess since 2021 season

== Premierships ==
Year	Senior Men's	Men's Reserves	Men's Division Two	Senior Women's	Women's Reserves
	THE SOUTH COAST AFL				
1969	Wollongong Lions				
1970	Wollongong Lions				
1971	Albatross				
1972	Albatross				
1973	Nowra				
1974	Nowra				
1975	Albatross				
1976	Nowra				
1977	Nowra				
1978	Albatross				
1979	Albatross				
1980	Nowra				
1981	East Nowra				
1982	Nowra				
1983	Albatross				
1984	Albatross				
1985	Batemans Bay				
1986	Batemans Bay				
1987	Batemans Bay				
1988	Batemans Bay				
	LEISURE COAST AFL				
1989	Bomaderry				
1990	Albatross				
1991	Albatross				
1992	Albatross				
1993	Port Kembla				
1994	Bomaderry				
1995	Albatross				
1996	Albatross				
1997	Albatross				
1998	Nowra				
1999	Port Kembla				
2000	Bomaderry				
2001	Nowra				
	THE SOUTH COAST AFL				
2002	Nowra				
2003	Camden				
2004	Bomaderry				
2005	Camden				
2006	Bomaderry				
2007	Bomaderry				
2008	Bomaderry				
2009	Kiama	Kiama			
2010	Bomaderry				
2011	Kiama	Figtree			
	AFL SOUTH COAST				
2012	Wollongong Bulldogs				
2013	Wollongong Bulldogs				
2014	Wollongong Bulldogs				
2015	Wollongong Bulldogs	Figtree			
2016	Wollongong Lions	Wollongong Bulldogs			
2017	Wollongong Lions	Kiama			
2018	Kiama	Bomaderry	Bomaderry	Bomaderry	
2019	Wollongong Lions	Wollongong Bulldogs	Ulladulla	Wollongong Bulldogs	Ulladulla
2020	Figtree	Figtree	Figtree	Figtree	Shellharbour
2021	Cancelled due to Covid-19				
2022	Figtree	Wollongong Bulldogs	Wollongong Bulldogs	Wollongong Lions	Northern Districts
2023	Figtree	Wollongong Bulldogs	Wollongong Bulldogs	Wollongong Lions	Kiama
2024	Wollongong Bulldogs	Figtree		Figtree	Wollongong Lions
2025	Figtree	Bay & Basin		Figtree	Wollongong Bulldogs
2026					

== Best & Fairest Winners ==
Year	Senior Men's Tunbridge Medal	Men's Reserves Tom Smith Medal	Men's Division Two	Senior Women's Maddy Collier Medal	Women's Reserves
	THE SOUTH COAST AFL				
1969	Chris Golding (Nowra)				
1970	Terry Menadue (Albatross)				
1971	Chris Golding (Nowra)				
1972					
1973					
1974					
1975					
1976					
1977					
1978					
1979					
1980					
1981					
1982					
1983					
1984					
1985					
1986					
1987					
	LEISURE COAST AFL				
1988					
1989					
1990					
1991					
1992					
1993					
1994					
1995					
1996					
1997					
1998					
1999					
2000					
2001					
	THE SOUTH COAST AFL				
2002					
2003					
2004	M.Ganderton & R.Meyers (Bomaderry) & (Nowra)				
2005	M.Ryan (Albatross)				
2006	R.Simpson				
2007	P.Herbert & A.Mazey				
2008	S.Phillips				
2009	S.Dowling & R.Neels				
2010	M.Faulkner & S.Phillips				
2011	M.Pelda & L.Pound				
	AFL SOUTH COAST				
2012	Nick Mitchell				
2013	J.Miller (Bomaderry)				
2014	T.Charles (Bulldogs)				
2015	D.Perrett (Northern Districts)				
2016	J.Mahony (Kiama)				
2017	B.Williams (Kiama)				
2018	L.Maples (Lions)	Jack Boxsell (Bomaderry)		Sophie Phillips (Bomaderry)	
2019	Jacob Hennessy (Figtree)			Sophie Phillips (Bomaderry)	
2020	Brandon Lagana (Figtree)		Aimee Barnard (Kiama)		
2021	Cancelled due to Covid-19				
2022	Jacob Hennessy (Figtree)	Ryan Kelly (Bomaderry)		Alicia Anderson (Figtree)	
2023	Jack Woeckel-Hynes (Bulldogs)	Jack Boxsell (Bomaderry)			
2024	Jacob May (Figtree)			Kirsty Philpott (Lions)	
2025	Brandon Lagana (Figtree)			Sophie Phillips (Bomaderry)	
2026	Lachlan Highfield (Figtree)	Dane Hallinan & Scott Proctor (Bay and Basin)		Sophie Phillips (Bomaderry)	Luisa Marzotto (Bulldogs)

== Honours ==
=== Life Members ===
- Ray Tunbridge, 1975
- Alan Blacker, 1977
- Tom Smith, 1979
- John Collier, 1980
- Stewart Stephens, 1981
- Ian Biggs, 1983
- Eddie Smith, 1985
- Greg Perry, 1987
- John Ford, 1996
- D. Cornish, 1997
- K. Blundell, Reg Douglas and N. Hickmott, 1998
- K. Bright, L. Bright and J. Tatnell, 2005
- Max Avery, 2009
- Terry Ashton, 2011
- John Dyball, 2026

=== Tom Smith Memorial Trophy ===
A lightning premiership played at the start of the season.

- 1977 Bomaderry
- 1978 Albatross
- 1979 Nowra
- 1980 East Nowra
- 1981 Nowra
- 1982 Nowra
- 1984 Albatross
- 1990 Bomaderry
- 1991 Bomaderry
- 1992 Albatross
- 1993 Port Kembla
- 1994 Bomaderry
- 1995 Nowra
- 1996 Bomaderry
- 1997 Bomaderry
- 1998 Port Kembla
- 1999 Camden
- 2001 Albatross
- 2002 Bomaderry
- 2003 Camden
- 2004 Albatross
- 2005 Albatross
- 2006 Camden
- 2007 Nowra
- 2008 Bomaderry
- 2009 Kiama
- 2010 Northern Districts
- 2011 Wollongong University
- 2012 Kiama
- 2013 Kiama
- 2017 Figtree

=== Hall of Fame ===
- 2017 Neville Hickmott
- 2018 Ray Tunbridge
- 2019 Tom Smith
- 2022 Max Avery
- 2022 Dave Johnson

== AFL players ==
- Arthur Chilcott had a short career with the Sydney Swans between 1984 and 1985. He played 13 games and scored 14 goals.
- Aidan Riley was rookie listed by the Adelaide Crows via the NSW scholarship program, making his debut in 2011 in their round 19 match against Port Adelaide. In 2014 he joined the Melbourne Football Club and after playing the 2014 and 2015 seasons returned to Adelaide to play with the Sturt Football Club in the SANFL. Aidan Riley retired from Sturt in 2019.
- James Bell played his debut game for the Sydney Swans in 2019 against Port Adelaide. A former Shellharbour Junior, James signed with the Swans as a Rookie in 2017.

== AFLW players ==
- Amelia Martin was drafted by the Sydney Swans with pick No.56 in the 2024 AFL Women's draft. Amelia played her debut game in 2025 in round 2 against the Gold Coast Suns and went on to play 6 games in her debut season with the club.
- Ellie Veerhuis debuted for the Gold Coast Suns in round 1 2025 against West Coast Eagles. A former Figtree AFC junior, Ellie signed with the Gold Cost Suns as an injury replacement in 2025 and went on to play 11 games in her first season with the club.

== See also ==
- Illawarra Rugby League
- Group 6 Rugby League
- Group 7 Rugby League
- Group 16 Rugby League
- Sapphire Coast Australian Football League
- Football South Coast
- South Coast Open
