= Daniel Talia =

Australian rules footballer

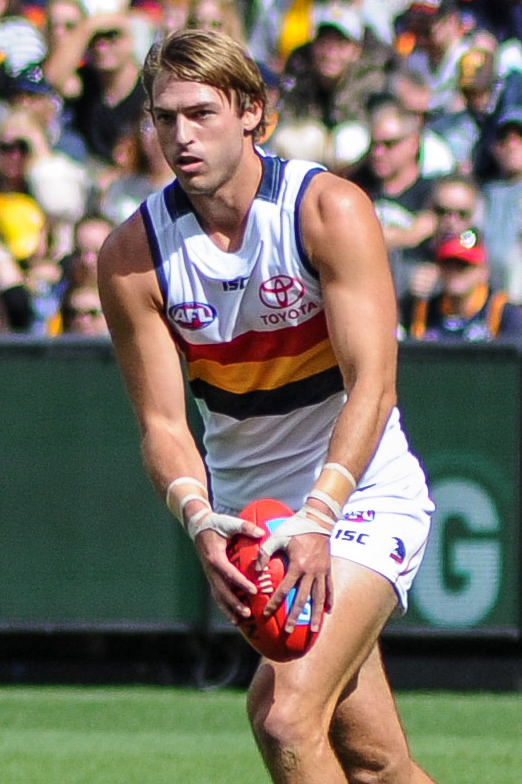
- Talia playing for Adelaide in April 2017

Personal information
- Full name: Daniel Talia
- Nickname: Tals
- Born: 2 October 1991 (age 35)
- Original teams: Greenvale (EDFL); Assumption College; Calder Cannons (TAC Cup)
- Draft: No. 13, 2009 national draft
- Debut: Round 15, 2011, Adelaide vs. Sydney, at AAMI Stadium
- Height: 197 cm (6 ft 6 in)
- Weight: 98 kg (216 lb)
- Position: Key defender

Playing career^{1}
Years	Club	Games (Goals)
2010–2021	Adelaide	200 (6)
- ^{1} Playing statistics correct to the end of 2020.

Career highlights
- Malcolm Blight Medal (2014); 2× All-Australian: (2014, 2016); 3× 22under22 team (2012, 2013, 2014); Ron Evans Medal (2012)

Daniel Talia (born 2 October 1991) is a former professional Australian rules football player who played for the Adelaide Football Club in the Australian Football League (AFL). He was drafted with selection 13 in the 2009 National Draft from the Calder Cannons. In 2012 he won the AFL Rising Star award as the best young player in the league. Talia is the great-grandson of former Footscray player Arthur Stevens, and the grandson of Harvey Stevens who played in Footscray's 1954 VFL Grand Final victory. His younger brother, Michael Talia, played for the Western Bulldogs before being traded to the Sydney Swans after the 2015 season.

== Pre-AFL career ==
Talia played junior football for Greenvale and Assumption College in Kilmore, which boasts a strong football history. He played centre-half forward for the Calder Cannons and in defence for Victoria Metro in the 2009 AFL Under-18 Championships, for which he was selected in the U18 All-Australian team. He missed the second half of the 2009 season due to a hamstring injury.

== AFL career ==
After one and a half years on Adelaide's list, Talia made his AFL debut in round 15 of the 2011 season and held his place in the side for the rest of the season, playing nine games in total. He achieved this despite carrying an Achilles injury throughout the season, and was rewarded with the Mark Bickley award for the Crows' best first or second year player.

Talia had a breakout year in 2012. With the departure of Nathan Bock and Phil Davis in the last two seasons, and with Ben Rutten ageing, he regularly played on the opposition's best forward with great success, contributing to the club's unexpected run to the preliminary finals. Talia was nominated for the 2012 AFL Rising Star award for his shut-down effort on St Kilda's Nick Riewoldt in round 12, and at the end of the season was voted the winner of the award. His season came to a heartbreaking end when he broke his arm in Adelaide's Qualifying Final loss to the Sydney Swans. Prior to the 2013 season, Talia extended his contract for three more years, that kept him at Adelaide until the end of 2016.

Talia continued to deliver in 2013, leading the club in spoils and intercept possessions, and conceding only one goal per game despite being opposed to the opposition's leading forward. He finished equal third in the club best and fairest in 2013. In 2014 Talia added another dimension to his game, increasing his attacking output while remaining miserly in defence. He was rewarded with the Malcolm Blight Medal for the club's best and fairest player, and was also named at full-back in the All-Australian team for 2014. He continued to perform reliably in 2015, finishing in the top 10 of the club champion count and becoming the youngest member of Adelaide's leadership group. At the end of 2015, Daniel and his brother Michael, then playing for the Western Bulldogs, were the subject of an AFL investigation into allegations Michael provided Daniel with game-sensitive information ahead of their two clubs meeting in the 2015 Second Elimination Final. The pair were subsequently cleared.

On 24 February 2016, Talia re-signed with the Crows until the end of 2021.

In the opening round of the 2017 season, Talia was penalized for pushing the ball across the goal line from outside of the goal square in a stricter interpretation of the deliberately rushed behind rule than had been applied in previous seasons. Though Crows fans jeered at the decision, coach Don Pyke said that it was the correct interpretation. In the Crows’ round five match against Gold Coast Talia limped from the ground with a hamstring injury barely a minute into the game. The Crows went on to win the game by 67 points regardless. Later in the week, scans showed that there was no serious injury and was able to play the next round. In round 18 Talia effected 16 spoils, the most out of anyone in the league in that round, and the next week he broke his own club record for the most one-percenters in a match, getting 17. After round 19 he had more spoils (154) and had won more one-on-one contests (34) than any player in the league.

Near the end of the season in a match against Sydney, Talia suffered an ankle injury, which resulted in his omission from the Crows’ final match of the home and away season against West Coast. At the end of the year he played in Adelaide’s Grand Final loss to Richmond.

In August 2021, Talia was not offered a contract by Adelaide for the 2022 season and was delisted at the conclusion of the 2021 season, and subsequently retired in October due to injury.

== Statistics ==
Statistics are correct to end of 2021 season

Legend
G	Goals	K	Kicks	D	Disposals	T	Tackles
B	Behinds	H	Handballs	M	Marks

Season	Team	No.	Games	Totals							Averages (per game)						
Season	Team	No.	Games	G	B	K	H	D	M	T	G	B	K	H	D	M	T
2011	Adelaide	12	9	0	0	59	51	110	27	31	0.0	0.0	6.6	5.7	12.2	3.0	3.4
2012	Adelaide	12	23	1	2	107	79	186	60	41	0.0	0.1	4.7	3.4	8.1	2.6	1.8
2013	Adelaide	12	22	3	0	143	103	246	93	35	0.1	0.0	6.5	4.7	11.2	4.2	1.6
2014	Adelaide	12	22	0	1	167	93	260	105	24	0.0	0.1	7.6	4.2	11.8	4.8	1.1
2015	Adelaide	12	22	1	0	152	81	233	81	37	0.1	0.0	6.9	3.9	10.6	3.7	1.7
2016	Adelaide	12	24	1	0	208	166	374	143	45	0.0	0.0	8.7	6.9	15.6	6.0	1.9
2017	Adelaide	12	24	0	0	146	154	30	101	45	0.0	0.0	6.1	6.4	12.5	4.2	1.9
2018	Adelaide	12	18	0	0	139	119	258	92	37	0.0	0.0	7.7	6.6	14.3	5.1	2.1
2019	Adelaide	12	22	0	0	171	97	268	120	48	0.0	0.0	7.8	4.4	12.2	5.5	2.2
2020 (Note: The 2020 season was played with 17 home-and-away matches per team (down from 22) and 16-minute quarters with time on (down from 20-minute quarters with time on) due to the impact of the COVID-19 pandemic.)	Adelaide	12	14	0	0	83	41	124	47	15	0.0	0.0	5.9	2.9	8.9	3.4	1.1
2021	Adelaide	12	0	—	—	—	—	—	—	—	—	—	—	—	—	—	—
Career			200	6	3	1375	984	2359	869	358	0.0	0.0	6.9	4.9	11.8	4.3	1.8

== Honours and achievements ==
Individual

- All-Australian: 2014 2016
- Malcolm Blight Medal (Adelaide F.C. Best & Fairest): 2014
- AFL Rising Star Award: 2012
- 22 Under 22 team: 2012, 2013, 2014
