= Daniel Archer =

Australian rules football player

Personal information
- Full name: Daniel John Archer
- Born: 26 October 1991 (age 35)
- Original team: Kingborough
- Draft: No. 36, 2010 Rookie Draft
- Height: 193 cm (6 ft 4 in)
- Weight: 99 kg (218 lb)
- Position: Forward

Playing career^{1}
Years	Club	Games (Goals)
2009	Clarence	9 (3)
2010–2011	Sandringham	42 (40)
2011–2012	St Kilda	1 (0)
2013	North Adelaide	3 (0)
2017	Tigers	3 (4)
- ^{1} Playing statistics correct to the end of 2011.

Daniel John Archer (born 26 October 1991) is an Australian rules football player who played for St Kilda Football Club in the Australian Football League (AFL) and North Adelaide Football Club in the South Australian National Football League (SANFL).

Originally from Tasmanian Football League (TFL) club Clarence, Archer was recruited by St Kilda with pick number 36 at the 2010 AFL Rookie Draft and made his senior AFL debut in round 2, 2011, against Richmond. Dropped after a quiet match, Archer did not return to the senior team and played the remainder of 2011 and all of 2012 with St Kilda's Victorian Football League (VFL) affiliated side Sandringham.

Archer was delisted by St Kilda at the end of 2012 and recruited by SANFL club North Adelaide. Injuries delayed his debut for North Adelaide until Round 19 of the 2013 SANFL season. He left North Adelaide after a single injury-riddled season in which he managed only three senior games to move to Wangaratta Rovers in the Ovens & Murray Football League for the 2014 season.

Archer played a one-off game for Tasmanian Football League (TSL) club Kingborough in 2017.
