= Terry Wight =

Australian rules footballer

Personal information
- Full name: Terry Wight
- Born: 11 November 1956 (age 69)
- Original team: Reservoir Old Boys
- Height: 183 cm (6 ft 0 in)
- Weight: 78.5 kg (173 lb)

Playing career^{1}
Years	Club	Games (Goals)
1976–79	Collingwood	39 (6)
1981	Footscray	3 (0)
Total		42 (6)
- ^{1} Playing statistics correct to the end of 1981.

Terry Wight (born 11 November 1956) is a former Australian rules footballer who played with Collingwood and Footscray in the Victorian Football League (VFL).
