= Anthony Rock =

Australian rules footballer

Personal information
- Full name: Anthony Rock
- Born: 29 September 1970 (age 56)
- Original teams: Hadfield, St Dominic's
- Height: 175 cm (5 ft 9 in)
- Weight: 76 kg (168 lb)
- Position: Midfielder

Playing career^{1}
Years	Club	Games (Goals)
1988–1998	North Melbourne	178 (138)
1999–2001	Hawthorn	44 (17)
Total		222 (155)
- ^{1} Playing statistics correct to the end of 2001.

Career highlights
- AFL premiership player: 1996; VFL premiership player: 2001

Anthony Rock (born 29 September 1970) is a former Australian rules footballer who played for North Melbourne and Hawthorn in the VFL/AFL.

== Junior career ==
Rock played his junior football at St Dominic's Junior FC—a club that later folded due to lack of parent volunteers, leaving him without a club at age 13.

He moved to the Hadfield Football Club, and it was this club from which he was recruited by North Melbourne.

== AFL career ==
He made his debut in the league during the 1988 season with North Melbourne. He stayed with the club a further 3 years after playing in their 1996 centenary premiership, moving to Hawthorn until his retirement in 2001. His final game was with VFL affiliate Box Hill Hawks, securing another flag in the club's first premiership.

== Coaching career ==
From 2002 to 2004, Rock was the head coach and development manager of the North Ballarat Rebels in the TAC Cup. During this period, Rock guided many young players into AFL careers. Among those drafted under his tutelage were Jed Adcock, Clinton Young, Troy Chaplin, Shaun Grigg, Liam Picken, Matt Rosa, Michael Jamieson and Brad Sewell.

From 2005 to 2008, Rock was the Midfield Coach at Melbourne, St. Kilda, and then back to North Melbourne after departing the AFL system.

During this period (2011–2015), it was announced that Rock would become the new senior Coach at Greenvale in the Essendon District Football League. Here, he led the club to back-to-back Premierships (2012/13) before heading to the St Bernard's Football Club (VAFA) in the Victorian Amateur Football Association, where he coached them to a flag in the 2015 Premier Division. His time at St Bernard's saw a further two of his players drafted in Mitch Hannan (Melbourne) and Ben Ronke (Sydney).

He then joined Fremantle as a development coach for the 2016 season and was then promoted to their Midfield Coach from 2017 to 2019.

== Accelerate program ==
In 2010, the AFLPA supported Anthony Rock with his Accelerate program which provided a unique opportunity for 20 young men rejected by the AFL draft the first time around by putting together an infrastructure of expertise in a bid to keep the game's most talented second-tier players from 18 to 23 in the correct physical and emotional state to win a second chance. In partnership with sports consulting group Infront, three major sponsors, and the AFLPA's support, Rock was able to set up partnerships with seven VFL clubs and worked with 20 footballers hoping to be drafted.

== Statistics ==
Legend
G	Goals	K	Kicks	D	Disposals	T	Tackles
B	Behinds	H	Handballs	M	Marks

Season	Team	No.	Games	Totals							Averages (per game)							Votes
Season	Team	No.	Games	G	B	K	H	D	M	T	G	B	K	H	D	M	T	Votes
1988	North Melbourne	52	4	2	0	21	8	29	2	3	0.5	0.0	5.3	2.0	7.3	0.5	0.8	0
1989	North Melbourne	44	1	0	1	14	13	27	4	2	0.0	1.0	14.0	13.0	27.0	4.0	2.0	0
1990	North Melbourne	3	14	13	14	212	63	275	39	24	0.9	1.0	15.1	4.5	19.6	2.8	1.7	7
1991	North Melbourne	3	20	25	14	301	144	445	62	24	1.3	0.7	15.1	7.2	22.3	3.1	1.2	1
1992	North Melbourne	3	9	9	6	140	58	198	25	11	1.0	0.7	15.6	6.4	22.0	2.8	1.2	0
1993	North Melbourne	3	17	14	9	249	73	322	34	19	0.8	0.5	14.6	4.3	18.9	2.0	1.1	2
1994	North Melbourne	3	23	11	16	243	114	357	39	33	0.5	0.7	10.6	5.0	15.5	1.7	1.4	1
1995	North Melbourne	3	24	19	13	273	114	387	59	38	0.8	0.5	11.4	4.8	16.1	2.5	1.6	0
1996†	North Melbourne	3	25	23	24	368	159	527	95	43	0.9	1.0	14.7	6.4	21.1	3.8	1.7	3
1997	North Melbourne	3	22	14	9	297	115	412	69	40	0.6	0.4	13.5	5.2	18.7	3.1	1.8	0
1998	North Melbourne	3	19	8	8	157	81	238	44	17	0.4	0.4	8.3	4.3	12.5	2.3	0.9	5
1999	Hawthorn	32	15	7	6	129	85	214	40	23	0.5	0.4	8.6	5.7	14.3	2.7	1.5	0
2000	Hawthorn	32	24	10	4	235	129	364	91	32	0.4	0.2	9.8	5.4	15.2	3.8	1.3	0
2001	Hawthorn	32	5	0	1	35	21	56	15	11	0.0	0.2	7.0	4.2	11.2	3.0	2.2	0
Career			222	155	125	2674	1177	3851	618	320	0.7	0.6	12.0	5.3	17.3	2.8	1.4	19
