= Nathan Gordon (footballer) =

Australian rules footballer

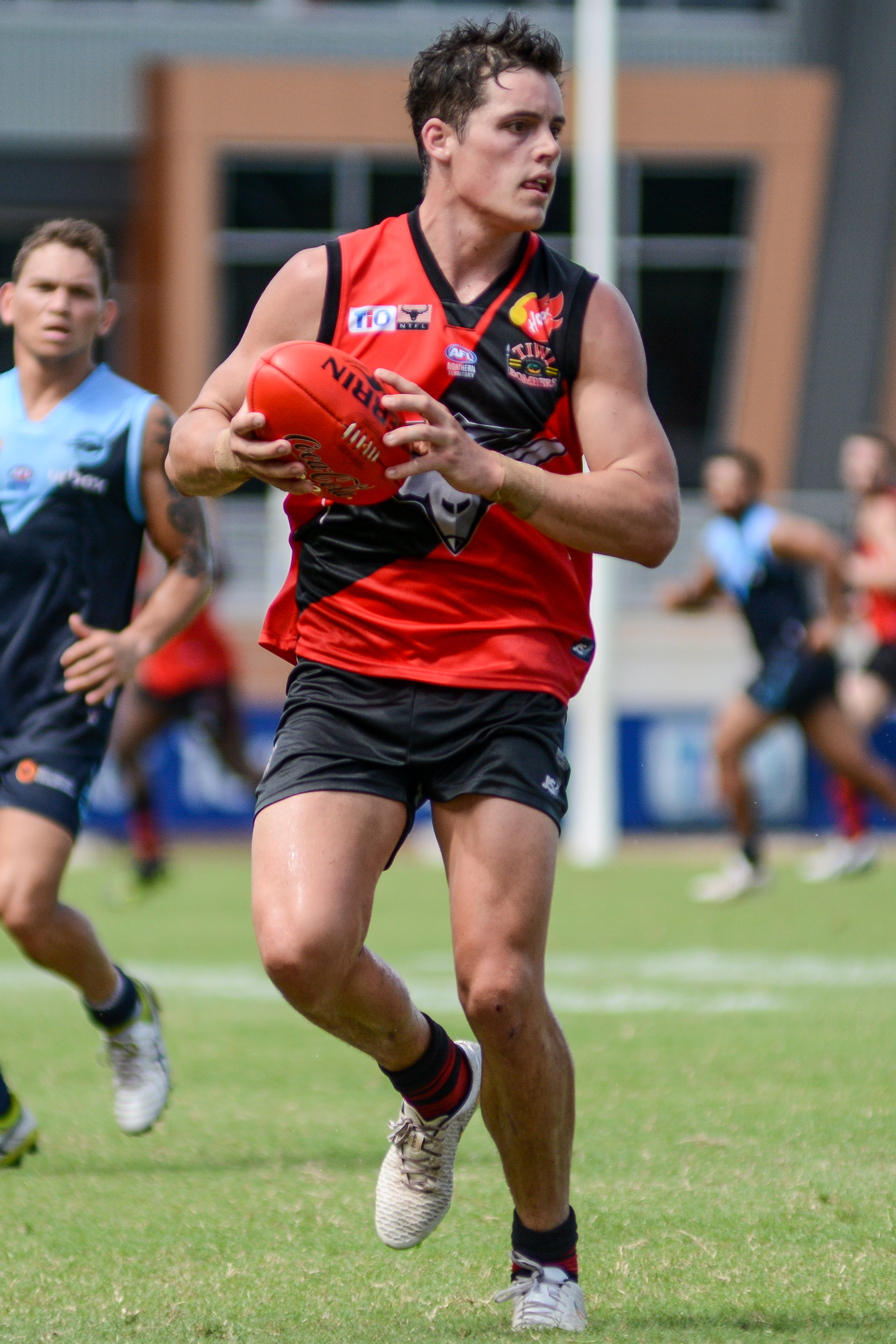
- Gordon playing for the Tiwi Bombers in February 2016

Personal information
- Full name: Nathan Gordon
- Born: 12 February 1990 (age 36)
- Original teams: East Coast Eagles (Sydney AFL); North Adelaide (SANFL)
- Draft: No. 71, 2010 Rookie Draft
- Height: 187 cm (6 ft 2 in)
- Weight: 86 kg (190 lb)
- Position: Midfielder

Playing career^{1}
Years	Club	Games (Goals)
2011–2012	Sydney	2 (1)
2014–2015	Richmond	21 (18)
Total		23 (19)
- ^{1} Playing statistics correct to the end of 2015.

Nathan Gordon (born 12 February 1990) is a former professional Australian rules footballer who played with the Sydney Swans and Richmond Football Club in the Australian Football League (AFL). He made his debut in round 7, 2011 against the Western Bulldogs. He was delisted by the Swans at the end of the 2012 season.

After a strong season with North Adelaide in the South Australian National Football League (SANFL), Gordon was drafted by Richmond with pick No. 50 in the 2013 AFL draft.

He was delisted by Richmond in October 2015.
