= Christian Howard (footballer) =

Australian rules footballer

Personal information
- Full name: Christian Howard
- Born: 19 March 1991 (age 35); Adelaide, South Australia
- Original team: Sacred Heart College/Glenelg (SANFL)
- Draft: #15, 2009 National Draft, Western Bulldogs
- Height: 184 cm (6 ft 0 in)
- Weight: 81 kg (12 st 11 lb; 179 lb)
- Position: Midfielder

Playing career^{1}
Years	Club	Games (Goals)
2011–2014	Western Bulldogs	20 (3)
2015–2017	Glenelg	48 (12)
Total		68 (15)
- ^{1} Playing statistics correct to the end of 2017.

Christian Howard (born 19 March 1991) is an Australian rules footballer who played for the Western Bulldogs in the Australian Football League.

Originally from Adelaide, South Australia, Howard was drafted to the Bulldogs from the Glenelg Football Club in the SANFL with their first selection, the 15th overall in the 2009 AFL draft. Howard was a surprise selection for the Bulldogs in the draft, with many predicting he would not be drafted until at least the third round.

Seen as a potential long-term replacement for Lindsay Gilbee, Howard missed a large part of his first season with a hip injury and could not force his way into the senior lineup. Howard made his senior debut for the Western Bulldogs in round 10 on Sunday, 29 May 2011, he played well picking up 11 possessions in the side's 29-point loss to Hawthorn.

Howard was delisted at the conclusion of the 2014 AFL season.
