= Will Johnson (Australian footballer) =

Australian rules footballer

Personal information
- Full name: Will Johnson
- Born: 26 October 1989 (age 37)
- Original teams: Collegians, Sandringham
- Draft: No. 77, 2009 National draft
- Height: 191 cm (6 ft 3 in)
- Weight: 91 kg (201 lb)
- Position: Defender

Playing career^{1}
Years	Club	Games (Goals)
2010–2011	St Kilda	1 (0)
- ^{1} Playing statistics correct to the end of 2011.

Will Johnson (born 26 October 1989) is an Australian rules footballer who played as a defender for the St Kilda Football Club in the Australian Football League (AFL).

Johnson was recruited from the Sandringham Zebras in the Victorian Football League (VFL) after beginning his football career for Collegians Football Club in the Victorian Amateur Football Association, where he was sidelined with a shoulder injury before playing with Sandringham.

According to the St Kilda website, Johnson's backline play is comparable to that of former Geelong backman, Matthew Egan.

Drafted by St Kilda in the 2009 AFL draft, Johnson played one senior game before being delisted by St Kilda after the 2011 AFL season. He signed with VFL side Box Hill Hawks for 2012.

After playing 17 senior games in two years with the Box Hill Hawks, Johnson joined the stand-alone VFL club Port Melbourne. He started off his 2014 season with five goals and a best on ground performance.
