= Byron Sumner =

Australian rules footballer

Personal information
- Full name: Byron Sumner
- Born: 31 October 1991 (age 35)
- Original team: Woodville South
- Draft: 54th overall, 2009; Sydney Swans
- Height: 174 cm (5 ft 9 in)
- Weight: 68 kg (150 lb)

Playing career^{1}
Years	Club	Games (Goals)
2011	Sydney	1 (0)
- ^{1} Playing statistics correct to the end of 2011.

Career highlights
- SA AFL U18 Championships

Byron Sumner (born 31 October 1991) is a former Australian rules footballer for the Sydney Swans in the Australian Football League (AFL).

Sumner was drafted to Sydney with the 54th selection in the 2009 AFL draft. He was recruited from Woodville-West Torrens in the South Australian National Football League. He played in the opening round of the 2011 AFL season, but was delisted at the end of the season without playing another AFL game. He returned to South Australian and continued to play for Woodville-West Torrens until he signed with Sturt Football Club for the 2017 SANFL season.

He is the brother of Gold Coast 2012 draft selection Tim Sumner and the uncle of former Sydney teammate Lewis Jetta.
