= Nicholas Winmar =

Australian rules footballer (born 1991)

Nick Winmar

Personal information
- Full name: Nicholas Winmar
- Born: 27 April 1991 (age 35)
- Original team: South Fremantle Football Club
- Draft: 32nd overall, 2009 National Draft
- Height: 189 cm (6 ft 2 in)
- Weight: 81 kg (179 lb)

Playing career^{1}
Years	Club	Games (Goals)
2010–2011	St Kilda	2 (0)
- ^{1} Playing statistics correct to the end of 2011.

Nicholas "Nick" Winmar (born 27 April 1991) is an Australian rules footballer who played for the St Kilda Football Club in the Australian Football League (AFL).

Winmar is the second cousin of former St Kilda and Western Bulldogs player Nicky Winmar. St Kilda drafted him with the 32nd selection in the 2009 AFL draft from Claremont Football Club in the West Australian Football League (WAFL).

Winmar made his debut in round 9, 2011 against the Melbourne Football Club and played the following week against Fremantle Football Club before being dropped back to the Victorian Football League (VFL). Winmar was then named as an emergency several times towards the end of the 2011 season.

He was delisted at the conclusion of the 2012 season, despite being contracted until the end of the 2013 season.
