= James Mulligan (Australian footballer) =

Australian rules footballer (born 1989)

Personal information
- Full name: James Mulligan
- Born: 14 June 1989 (age 37)
- Original team: Southport (QAFL)
- Draft: No. 4, 2008 Rookie draft, Western Bulldogs; No. 92 (RP) 2009 National draft, Western Bulldogs
- Height: 199 cm (6 ft 6 in)
- Weight: 99 kg (218 lb)
- Position: Ruckman / Defender

Playing career^{1}
Years	Club	Games (Goals)
2011	Western Bulldogs	3 (0)
- ^{1} Playing statistics correct to the end of 2011.

James Mulligan (born 14 June 1989) is a professional Australian rules football player who was listed for the Western Bulldogs in the Australian Football League (AFL) until his retirement at the end of the 2012 season. He was drafted to the Western Bulldogs as their first pick and 4th pick overall in the 2008 Rookie draft. Mulligan was elevated to the Bulldogs' senior list with the 92nd selection in the 2009 AFL draft . He formerly played for the AFL Queensland team the Southport Sharks.
