= Wollongong Lions =

Names
- Full name: Wollongong Lions Australian Football Club
- Nickname: Lions

Club details
- Founded: 1966; 60 years ago
- Colours: red white
- Competition: AFL South Coast
- Coach: Ken Ewen-Chappell
- Ground: North Dalton Park

Uniforms
Home

Other information
- Official website: https://wollongonglionsafl.com.au/

Wollongong Lions is an Australian rules football club based out of Wollongong. It fields senior men's team in the AFL South Coast competition and a senior women's team in the AFL South Coast Women's team.

They play their home games at North Dalton Park in Towradgi, and following the installation of lighting during the summer of 2006–07 the club hosted 3 night matches during the 2007 season which attracted encouraging crowds. Trevor Burnett was head coach from 2008 to 2011 seasons, replacing Jason Philp after the 2007 season. Former Sydney Swans player Neil Brunton is the assistant coach. Current player/coach is Ken Ewen-Chappell.

The men's team have won back-to back premierships in 2016 and 2016 with another recent premiership in 2019 and the women's team won back-to-back premierships in 2022 and 2023.

== History ==
The club formed in 1966 and joined the South Coast AFL in 1971. Early on it was known as the Swans and moved to the Sydney AFL in 1989, becoming the Lions. After winning the First Division premiership in 2004, the Lions were promoted to Sydney AFL Premier Division in 2005. They won 3 games in 2005, 4 in 2006, 3 in 2007, 3 in 2008, 4 and a draw in 2009, and 2 in 2010.

In 2011 in response to their designated pathway area being further afield than merely the city of Wollongong, the club was renamed the Illawarra Lions. In 2015 the club reverted to its old name upon rejoining the AFL South Coast competition.
