= 2015 Melbourne Football Club season =

Melbourne Football Club
2015 season
- President: Glen Bartlett^{(2nd season)}
- Coach: Paul Roos^{(2nd season)}
- Captains: Nathan Jones^{(2nd season)}
- Home ground: MCG^{(100,024 capacity)}
- Pre-season: 1 win, 2 losses
- AFL season: 13th
- Finals series: DNQ
- Best and fairest: Bernie Vince
- Leading goalkicker: Jesse Hogan^{(44 goals)}
- Highest home attendance: 66,210^{(round 10 vs. Collingwood)}
- Lowest home attendance: 4,866^{(round 9 vs. Port Adelaide)}
- Average home attendance: 25172
- Club membership: 35,953^{(▲42 / ▲0.12%)}

The 2015 Melbourne Football Club season was the club's 116th year in the VFL/AFL since it began in 1897.

Despite improvements in 2014, Melbourne still produced a poor season in regards to results, which led to Melbourne receiving a financially and commercially challenging draw. The club played home games at the Melbourne Cricket Ground against Gold Coast, Fremantle, Sydney, Western Bulldogs, Brisbane Lions, St Kilda, and North Melbourne whom typically do not draw high crowds in Melbourne, and played Collingwood, Fremantle, Greater Western Sydney, St Kilda and Western Bulldogs twice. Games were broadcast on the Seven Network (free to air) for seven games, down from nine in 2014.

Even with financial and commercial challenges, the club continued to host its annual Queen's Birthday clash against Collingwood in round 10 and played its first Friday night game since round 7, 2012, which was against Richmond in round 4 as a lead into ANZAC day. The club also played more traditional time slots, as the AFL aimed to have a more 'fan friendly' fixture, with seventeen day games (up from twelve), two twilight matches (down from five) and three at night (down from five). In addition, the club played 17 matches in Victoria, and traveled to Adelaide, Canberra, and Perth once, and the Northern Territory twice.

Melbourne sold two of its home games to the Northern Territory due to a sponsorship deal made with Tourism NT. One was at TIO Traeger Park in Alice Springs in round 9 against Port Adelaide for the second year in a row. The other match was at TIO Stadium in Darwin for the sixth year in a row, which was against West Coast in round 14. In addition Melbourne hosted Greater Western Sydney at Etihad Stadium in round 23.

The club finished the season with 7 wins and 15 losses, this was the club's best result since the 2011 season.

== 2015 list changes ==
=== 2014 free agency ===
Player	Date	Free agent type	Former club	New club	Compensation	Ref
James Frawley	6 October 2014	Unrestricted	Melbourne	Hawthorn	1st round	
Sam Blease	3 November 2014	Delisted	Melbourne	Geelong	None	
Ben Newton	5 November 2014	Delisted	Port Adelaide	Melbourne	None	

=== 2014 trades ===
Date	Trade gained	Traded from	Trade lost	Ref
Jeff Garlett; Pick 83	9 October 2014	Carlton	Pick 61; Pick 79	
Heritier Lumumba	15 October 2014	Collingwood	Mitch Clark (involved in a 3-way deal with Geelong)	
Sam Frost; Pick 40; Pick 53	16 October 2014	Greater Western Sydney	Pick 23	

=== Retirements and delistings ===
Player	New club	League	Reason	Ref
Shannon Byrnes	Casey Scorpions	VFL	Retired, but stayed as a development coach	
Sam Blease	Geelong	AFL	Delisted	
Mitch Clisby	North Adelaide	SANFL	Delisted	
Michael Evans	Old Scotch	VAFA	Delisted	
Alex Georgiou	Norwood	SANFL	Delisted	
Daniel Nicholson	Port Fairy	Hampden Football League	Delisted	
James Strauss	Old Scotch	VAFA	Delisted	
Luke Tapscott	Sorrento	MPNFL	Delisted	
Dom Barry	NT Thunder	NEAFL	Returned to Central Australia	
Maia Westrupp	unknown	unknown	Returned to New Zealand	

=== National draft ===
Round	Overall pick	Player	State	Position	Team from	League from	Ref
1	2	Christian Petracca	(Victoria (state))	Midfielder	Eastern Ranges	TAC Cup	
1	3	Angus Brayshaw	(Victoria (state))	Midfielder	Sandringham	TAC Cup	
2	40	Alex Neal-Bullen	(South Australia)	Midfielder	Glenelg	SANFL	
3	42 (F/S)	Billy Stretch	(South Australia)	Midfielder	Glenelg	SANFL	
3	53	Oscar McDonald	(Victoria (state))	Defender	North Ballarat	TAC Cup	

=== Rookie draft ===
Round	Overall pick	Player	State	Position	Team from	League from	Ref
1	2	Aaron vandenBerg	(Australian Capital Territory)	Midfielder	Ainslie	NEAFL	
2	20	Mitch White	(Victoria (state))	Defender	Dandenong	TAC Cup	

== 2015 squad ==
Melbourne Football Club
Senior list		Rookie List	Coaching staff
1 Jesse Hogan; 2 Nathan Jones (c); 3 Christian Salem; 4 Jack Watts; 5 Jimmy Toumpas; 6 Chris Dawes; 7 Jack Viney; 8 Heritier Lumumba; 9 Jack Trengove; 10 Angus Brayshaw; 11 Max Gawn; 12 Dom Tyson; 13 Jordie McKenzie; 14 Lynden Dunn (vc) (vet); 15 Billy Stretch; 16 Dean Kent; 17 Sam Frost; 18 Daniel Cross; 19 Ben Newton; 20 Colin Garland	21 Cameron Pedersen; 22 Viv Michie; 23 Bernie Vince; 24 Jay Kennedy Harris; 25 Tom McDonald; 26 Christian Petracca; 27 Aidan Riley; 28 Oscar McDonald; 29 Jayden Hunt; 30 Alex Neal-Bullen; 31 Jack Grimes; 36 Jeff Garlett; 38 Jeremy Howe; 39 Neville Jetta; 40 Mark Jamar (vet); 42 Jake Spencer; 44 Rohan Bail; 45 Matt Jones; 46 Dean Terlich; 48 Jack Fitzpatrick	37 Aaron vandenBerg; 41 Mitch White; 43 James Harmes; 47 Max King	Head coach: Paul Roos; Assistant coaches: Simon Goodwin (senior assistant); Brendan McCartney (development and strategy); Ben Mathews (midfield coach); Jade Rawlings (backline coach); Daniel McPherson (forward coach); Brett Allison (head of development); Brad Miller (development coach); Shannon Byrnes (welfare and development coach); Legend: (c) Captain(s); (vc) Vice-captain(s); Long-term injury list; Upgraded rookie(s); (vet) Veterans list; Updated: 11 September 2015; Source(s): Team List, Staff Members

== 2015 season ==
=== Pre-season ===
==== NAB Challenge ====
===== Week 1 =====
Round 1
Thursday, March 5 (4:10 pm)	Fremantle	def.	Melbourne	Fremantle Oval (crowd: 8000 approx.)	Report
3.2 (20); 7.4 (46); 7.5 (47); 9.7 (61)	Q1; Q2; Q3; Final	3.1 (19); 3.2 (20); 6.6 (42); 6.7 (43)	Television broadcast: Fox Footy
Pavlich 3, Taberner 3, Crozier, Walters, Mayne	Goals	Newton, Dawes, N. Jones, Kent, Hogan, vandenBerg
Hill, Taberner, Neale, Pavlich, Mzungu, Sutcliffe	Best	N. Jones, Lumumba, Tyson, Cross, T. McDonald, Newton
Barlow (right ankle), Mundy (ankle), Duffield (left shoulder)	Injuries	Newton (cut head)
Nil	Reports	Nil
The opening quarter was positive for Melbourne with a courageous mark and goal to Ben Newton, followed by goals to Chris Dawes and Nathan Jones, which saw them lead by 13 points midway through the quarter.; Melbourne were notably more attacking compared with 2014 with faster ball movement and using the corridor more, however, Fremantle took the lead into the quarter break by one point.; The second quarter saw Fremantle kick four goals to nil as their defensive pressure proved too strong for Melbourne. They were restricted to one point, and there was little ball movement with no signs of improvement heading into the second half.; The third quarter showed a rejuvenated Melbourne, as they kicked three goals to nil. Fremantle had not seen the ball inside their forward 50 for much of the quarter, as they could only manage one point, resulting in a five point margin at the final break.; Four minutes into the final quarter, Melbourne had a chance to take the lead with a free kick to Mark Jamar 20 meters out. The shot was kicked out on the full, the resulting free kick was then kicked into the opposite behind post by Cameron Sutcliffe, allowing for Christian Salem to have a shot on goal, which was too kicked out on the full.; Fremantle took control over the match and kicked the last two goals of the match, ensuing in an 18 point victory.

===== Week 2 =====
Round 2
Saturday, March 14 (4:10 pm)	Western Bulldogs	def. by	Melbourne	Eureka Stadium (crowd: 6000 approx.)	Report
0.0.1 (1); 0.1.1 (7); 0.4.4 (28); 0.9.8 (62)	Q1; Q2; Q3; Final	0.2.2 (14); 0.8.4 (52); 0.9.6 (60); 0.10.9 (69)	Television broadcast: AFL Media
Cordy 2, Grant, Bontempelli, Goodes, Minson, M. Boyd, Jong	Goals	Garlett 2, Kennedy Harris 2, Cross, Hogan, Dawes, N. Jones, Frost, Watts
Honeychurch, M. Boyd, Bontempelli, Goodes, Minson, Stringer	Best	Kennedy Harris, Garlett, N. Jones, Grimes, Cross, Salem, Lumumba
Nil	Injuries	vandenBerg (head)
Nil	Reports	Nil
The second week of the NAB Challenge saw Melbourne travel to Ballarat where they started strongly by kicking two goals to nil in the first quarter, whilst kicking into the wind.; The second quarter saw Melbourne kick a further six goals, to have a lead of forty-five points at half time.; The opening half saw Melbourne dominate the possession count (128-42) and uncontested marks (58-4). Turnovers by the Western Bulldogs contributed to Melbourne's ascendancy, however, the dominance ceased as the Bulldogs fought back in the second half.; The final quarter saw the Bulldogs get to within eight points at the 20-minute mark after an Ayce Cordy goal, however, Melbourne managed to settle and win by an eventual seven point margin.

===== Week 3 =====
Round 3
Friday, March 20 (5:50 pm)	Melbourne	def. by	Essendon	Etihad Stadium	Report
0.2.4 (16); 0.5.7 (37); 0.9.8 (62); 0.11.9 (75)	Q1; Q2; Q3; Final	0.2.1 (13); 0.6.1 (37); 0.9.8 (62); 0.11.11 (77)	Television broadcast: Fox Footy
Garlett 4, vandenBerg 2, Dawes 2, Watts 2, Viney	Goals	Daniher 3, Fantasia 2, Dalgleish 2, J. Merrett, Langford, Zaharakis, Edwards
Lumumba, Tyson, Garlett, Salem, N. Jones, vandenBerg	Best	Cooney, Goddard, Chapman, Gwilt, Ashby, Daniher
Newton (leg)	Injuries	Laverde (knee)
Nil	Reports	Nil
Melbourne faced a severely under-strength Essendon due to the 2012-listed players sitting out the NAB Challenge due to the 2012 supplement program.; The trend of fast starts during the NAB challenge continued for Melbourne, where they kicked the first two goals and gained a 14-point lead during the 14th minute of the first quarter.; The 14-point margin would be the highest lead for either side during the match, and the back-and-forth match saw the lead change seven times.; Melbourne looked set to win the match as they took control over the last quarter and gained a two goal margin, however, a goal by Shaun Edwards drew Essendon to within four points.; The last few minutes of the match saw Melbourne control the possession, however, a crucial turnover by Jack Viney eventuated as he attempted to kick across defensive goal, where Lauchlan Dalgleish intercepted the kick and ran on to kick a goal. This led to a two-point lead for Essendon with 1:24 left on the clock, and was the ultimate winning margin for Essendon.

=== Home and away season ===
==== Round 1 ====
Round 1
Saturday, 4 April (1:40 pm)	Melbourne	def.	Gold Coast	MCG (crowd: 27,013)	Report
2.5 (17); 7.7 (49); 12.9 (81); 17.13 (115)	Q1; Q2; Q3; Final	1.2 (8); 3.6 (24); 8.8 (56); 13.11 (89)	Television broadcast: Fox Footy
Watts 3, Tyson 2, Garlett 2, Hogan 2, Newton 2, Jamar, Garland, N. Jones, vandenBerg, Lumumba, Salem	Goals	Day 2, Rischitelli 2, Ablett 2, Sexton, Saad, Swallow, Gorringe, Bennell, Miller, Harbrow
N. Jones, Watts, T. McDonald, Viney, Garlett, Newton, Howe, vandenBerg, Jamar	Best	Prestia, Rischitelli, Swallow, Bennell, Saad
Nil	Injuries	Nil
Nil	Reports	Matt Shaw reported for rough conduct on Dean Kent
The lead up to the opening match for Melbourne and Gold Coast in 2015 focused heavily on the long-awaited return of Gary Ablett from a shoulder injury sustained in round 16, 2014.; The match saw three AFL debutants for Melbourne, Angus Brayshaw, Jesse Hogan, and Aaron vandenBerg, and four debuts for Melbourne from other clubs, Sam Frost, Jeff Garlett, Heritier Lumumba, and Ben Newton. The debut for Lumumba also marked his 200th AFL match, after playing 199 for Collingwood.; Melbourne showed that they were a much more attacking side compared with 2014 when the side averaged just over 60 points a match; the additions of Jesse Hogan and Jeff Garlett showed a more potent forward line as the ball was moved into the forward line more directly and they kicked two goals apiece.; Melbourne led comfortably for most of the match, however, two quick goals to Gary Ablett drew Gold Coast to within eight points in the last quarter. Another certain goal for the Gold Coast was looming, however, an uncharacteristic fumble by Ablett in the goal square created a turnover and Melbourne wrestled back the momentum.; Melbourne were eventual winners by 26 points.; The game was the first time that Melbourne had won a round one match since 2005, and the first time they kicked more than 100 points in a match since round 14, 2013.; Debut(s): Angus Brayshaw, Jesse Hogan, Aaron vandenBerg; Debut(s) for MFC: Sam Frost (Greater Western Sydney), Jeff Garlett (Carlton), Heritier Lumumba (Collingwood), Ben Newton (Port Adelaide); Milestone(s): Heritier Lumumba (200th AFL game), Jesse Hogan (1st AFL goal), Ben Newton (1st AFL goal), Aaron vandenBerg (1st AFL goal); Brownlow votes: Nathan Jones (Melbourne) 3 votes, Jack Viney (Melbourne) 2 votes, Dion Prestia (Gold Coast) 1 vote Record: 1 win, 0 losses, 0 draws (129.21%); Ladder position: 4th Substitutes: Jimmy Toumpas ▲ Angus Brayshaw ▼

==== Round 2 ====
Round 2
Saturday, 11 April (2:10 pm)	Greater Western Sydney	def.	Melbourne	StarTrack Oval (crowd: 8,811)	Report
0.2 (2); 2.6 (18); 11.8 (74); 15.11 (101)	Q1; Q2; Q3; Final	4.2 (26); 7.3 (45); 7.6 (48); 8.8 (56)	Television broadcast: Fox Footy
McCarthy 3, Shiel 3, Coniglio 2, Smith 2, Treloar, Wilson, Cameron, Scully, Mumford	Goals	Hogan 2, Newton 2, T. McDonald, Kent, Jamar, Garlett
Coniglio, Kelly, Haynes, Greene, Shaw, Shiel	Best	T. McDonald, Viney, Salem, Cross, Tyson, Lumumba
Tomlinson (toe)	Injuries	Nil
Nil	Reports	Nil
Brownlow votes: Callan Ward (Greater Western Sydney) 3 votes, Shane Mumford (Greater Western Sydney) 2 votes, Stephen Coniglio (Greater Western Sydney) 1 vote Record: 1 win, 1 loss, 0 draws (90.00%); Ladder position: 13th Substitutes: Angus Brayshaw ▲ Bernie Vince ▼

==== Round 3 ====
Round 3
Saturday, 18 April (1:40 pm)	Adelaide	def.	Melbourne	Adelaide Oval (crowd: 43,713)	Report
3.1 (19); 5.3 (33); 9.4 (58); 12.7 (80)	Q1; Q2; Q3; Final	3.4 (22); 4.6 (30); 6.9 (45); 7.13 (55)	Television broadcast: Fox Footy
Walker 3, Ellis-Yolmen 2, Cameron, Lynch, Jenkins, Mackay, Smith, Brown, Betts	Goals	Hogan 2, Garlett 2, Newton, N. Jones, Kent
Sloane, Mackay, Thompson, Jacobs, Douglas, Talia	Best	N. Jones, Lumumba, Howe, Vince, Cross, Tyson
Nil	Injuries	Frost (foot)
Nil	Reports	Nil
Brownlow votes: Scott Thompson (Adelaide) 3 votes, Rory Sloane (Adelaide) 2 votes, David Mackay (Adelaide) 1 vote Record: 1 win, 2 losses, 0 draws (83.70%); Ladder position: 12th Substitutes: Angus Brayshaw ▲ Sam Frost ▼

==== Round 4 ====
Round 4
Friday, 24 April (7:50 pm)	Richmond	def. by	Melbourne	MCG (crowd: 58,175)	Report
3.5 (23); 5.9 (39); 6.13 (49); 6.15 (51)	Q1; Q2; Q3; Final	4.2 (26); 6.5 (41); 10.9 (69); 12.11 (83)	Television broadcast: Seven Network
Edwards 2, Gordon, Arnot, Griffiths, Hunt	Goals	Hogan 2, Dawes 2, Garlett 2, Kennedy Harris, Vandenberg, Watts, N. Jones, Brayshaw, Vince
Edwards, Ellis, Martin, Miles, Riewoldt, Cotchin	Best	Vandenberg, Hogan, N. Jones, T. McDonald, Brayshaw, Tyson, Lumumba
Drummond (right knee), Griffiths (calf), Hunt (right knee)	Injuries	Kent (left hamstring), Jetta (concussion)
Nil	Reports	Nil
This was the Demons' first Friday night game in 3 years (an 11-goal loss to the Hawthorn in 2012), with the clubs' poor on-field performances meaning they hadn't been afforded a prime time spot.; The game marked the beginning of the Anzac Day weekend and the commemoration of 100 years since Gallipoli. A tribute before the match saw the stadium lights blacked out as the Last Post played with a minutes silence.; The match was close in the first-half, with a two-point margin at half-time, with the wet conditions making for a physical and contested match. Melbourne took control of the match in the second-half, resulting in a 32-point win.; The off-season recruits were key to the victory, including mature-aged recruit, Aaron vandenBerg, who recorded 13 tackles and a goal. Melbourne's second pick in the 2014 AFL draft and third overall, Angus Brayshaw, also provided an impact with 12 disposals and a goal.; Bernie Vince sealed the victory in the final term with a set shot from the 50-metre arc on a 45 degree angle.; At 2-2 it was the best start for Melbourne since 2011 when they were 2-1-1 after a draw against Sydney and wins against Brisbane Lions and Gold Coast.; Milestone(s): Angus Brayshaw (1st AFL goal); Brownlow votes: Nathan Jones (Melbourne) 3 votes, Bernie Vince (Melbourne) 2 votes, Shane Edwards (Richmond) 1 vote Record: 2 wins, 2 losses, 0 draws (96.26%); Ladder position: 12th Substitutes: Viv Michie ▲ Dean Kent ▼

==== Round 5 ====
Round 5
Sunday, 3 May (1:10 pm)	Melbourne	def. by	Fremantle	MCG (crowd: 22,892)	Report
2.2 (14); 5.4 (34); 6.8 (44); 6.14 (50)	Q1; Q2; Q3; Final	5.3 (33); 8.6 (54); 11.8 (74); 18.10 (118)	Television broadcast: Fox Footy
Garlett 3, Hogan, vandenBerg, Brayshaw	Goals	Mayne 4, D. Pearce 2, Suban 2, Neale 2, Taberner 2, Mundy 2, Hill, de Boer, Fyfe, Sandilands
Brayshaw, T. McDonald, Grimes, Garlett, Cross	Best	Fyfe, Mayne, Barlow, McPharlin, Neale, C. Pearce, Mundy, Suban
Salem (concussion)	Injuries	Walters (concussion), Pavlich (concussion)
Nil	Reports	Nil
Milestone(s): Jack Watts (100th AFL game); Brownlow votes: Nat Fyfe (Fremantle) 3 votes, David Mundy (Fremantle) 2 votes, Chris Mayne (Fremantle) 1 vote Record: 2 wins, 3 losses, 0 draws (81.77%); Ladder position: 13th Substitutes: Jordie McKenzie ▲ Christian Salem ▼

==== Round 6 ====
Round 6
Saturday, 9 May (7:20 pm)	Melbourne	def. by	Sydney	MCG (crowd: 26,894)	Report
1.1 (7); 1.3 (9); 4.5 (29); 7.8 (50)	Q1; Q2; Q3; Final	4.3 (27); 7.7 (49); 11.9 (75); 12.16 (88)	Television broadcast: Seven Network
Garlett 2, Hogan 2, Stretch, Newton, Dawes	Goals	Tippett 4, Kennedy 2, Pyke, McGlynn, Jetta, Hannebery, Parker, Goodes
T. McDonald, Salem, N. Jones, Hogan, Vince	Best	Mitchell, Kennedy, Tippett, Jack, Parker, Jetta, McVeigh
Dawes (knee), Tyson (knee)	Injuries	Heeney (knee), Lloyd (ankle), Hannebery (ankle)
Nil	Reports	Nil
Debut(s): Billy Stretch; Milestone(s): Billy Stretch (1st AFL goal); Brownlow votes: Tom Mitchell (Sydney) 3 votes, Josh Kennedy (Sydney) 2 votes, Kurt Tippett (Sydney) 1 vote Record: 2 wins, 4 losses, 0 draws (77.61%); Ladder position: 15th Substitutes: Jack Watts ▲ Cameron Pedersen ▼

==== Round 7 ====
Round 7
Saturday, 16 May (2:10 pm)	Hawthorn	def.	Melbourne	MCG (crowd: 41,935)	Report
6.2 (38); 10.6 (66); 18.8 (116); 24.11 (155)	Q1; Q2; Q3; Final	2.0 (12); 3.3 (21); 4.6 (30); 7.8 (50)	Television broadcast: Fox Footy
Roughead 4, Breust 3, Rioli 3, Schoenmakers 2, Hale 2, Puopolo 2, Langford 2, Suckling, Ceglar, Mitchell, Hartung, Hill, Gunston	Goals	Garlett 3, Pedersen 3, Bail
Mitchell, Hartung, Hill, Roughead, Burgoyne, Langford, Shiels, Ceglar	Best	Garlett, Pedersen, T. McDonald
Isaac Smith (illness) replaced in the selected side by Jonathan Simpkin	Injuries	Jesse Hogan (soreness) replaced in the selected side by Cameron Pedersen, Salem (hamstring)
Nil	Reports	Nil
Brownlow votes: Jarryd Roughead (Hawthorn) 3 votes, Shaun Burgoyne (Hawthorn) 2 votes, Sam Mitchell (Hawthorn) 1 vote Record: 2 wins, 5 losses, 0 draws (67.30%); Ladder position: 15th Substitutes: Billy Stretch ▲ Christian Salem ▼

==== Round 8 ====
Round 8
Sunday, 24 May (3:20 pm)	Melbourne	def.	Western Bulldogs	MCG (crowd: 29,381)	Report
3.3 (21); 7.5 (47); 10.10 (70); 15.13 (103)	Q1; Q2; Q3; Final	2.3 (15); 3.9 (27); 8.9 (57); 9.10 (64)	Television broadcast: Seven Network
Hogan 3, Pedersen 3, Toumpas 2, Vince 2, Howe, N. Jones, Newton, M. Jones, Garlett	Goals	Stringer 2, Dahlhaus, Jong, Wallis, Wood, Hunter, Dale, Picken
N. Jones, Pedersen, Hogan, Vince, Spencer, Cross, Toumpas	Best	M. Boyd, Dahlhaus, Wallis, Wood, Stevens
M. Jones (concussion)	Injuries	Goodes (arm)
Nil	Reports	Nil
Brownlow votes: Aaron vandenBerg (Melbourne) 3 votes, Jesse Hogan (Melbourne) 2 votes, Nathan Jones (Melbourne) 1 vote Record: 3 wins, 5 losses, 0 draws (75.34%); Ladder position: 14th Substitutes: Aidan Riley ▲ Matt Jones ▼

==== Round 9 ====
Round 9
Saturday, 30 May (1:40 pm)	Melbourne	def. by	Port Adelaide	TIO Traegar Park (crowd: 4,866)	Report
3.2 (20); 6.2 (38); 7.3 (45); 8.6 (54)	Q1; Q2; Q3; Final	1.2 (8); 8.4 (52); 12.6 (78); 18.7 (115)	Television broadcast: Fox Footy
Hogan 2, Garlett 2, Spencer, Lumumba, M. Jones, Fitzpatrick	Goals	Schulz 4, Monfries 3, Westhoff 2, Wingard 2, Amon, R. Gray, Stewart, White, Krakouer, Ebert, Hartlett
Brayshaw, N. Jones, T. McDonald, Hogan, Garland	Best	Ebert, Boak, R. Gray, Wines, Schulz, Wingard, Hartlett
Nil	Injuries	Nil
Nil	Reports	Nil
Milestone(s): Cameron Pedersen (50th AFL game), Jeff Garlett (200th AFL goal), Jesse Hogan (Rising Star round nominee); Brownlow votes: Robbie Gray (Port Adelaide) 3 votes, Brad Ebert (Port Adelaide) 2 votes, Travis Boak (Port Adelaide) 1 vote Record: 3 wins, 6 losses, 0 draws (71.54%); Ladder position: 15th Substitutes: Jack Viney ▲ Neville Jetta ▼

==== Round 10 ====
Round 10
Monday, 8 June (3:20 pm)	Melbourne	def. by	Collingwood	MCG (crowd: 66,120)	Report
3.1 (19); 9.1 (55); 13.4 (82); 13.7 (85)	Q1; Q2; Q3; Final	7.1 (42); 11.3 (69); 15.4 (94); 17.8 (110)	Television broadcast: Seven Network
Howe 3, N. Jones 2, Garlett 2, Vince 2, Hogan, Brayshaw, Fitzpatrick, Watts	Goals	Cloke 7, Elliott 3, Blair 3, Swan, Seedsman, Broomhead, Fasolo
N. Jones, Vince, Viney, Brayshaw, Cross, Jetta	Best	Cloke, Oxley, Pendlebury, Grundy, Williams, Langdon
Viney (corked calf), vandenBerg (hamstring)	Injuries	Nil
Nil	Reports	Nil
Milestones: Angus Brayshaw (Rising Star round nominee); Brownlow votes: Travis Cloke (Collingwood) 3 votes, Bernie Vince (Melbourne) 2 votes, Nathan Jones (Melbourne) 1 vote Record: 3 wins, 7 losses, 0 draws (72.19%); Ladder position: 15th Substitutes: Matt Jones ▲ Aaron vandenBerg ▼

==== Round 11 ====
Round 11
Sunday, 14 June (4:40 pm)	St Kilda	def.	Melbourne	Etihad Stadium (crowd: 25,187)	Report
3.5 (23); 9.6 (60); 11.9 (75); 12.13 (85)	Q1; Q2; Q3; Final	3.4 (22); 8.6 (54); 11.9 (75); 12.11 (83)	Television broadcast: Fox Footy
Riewoldt 4, Lonie 2, Membrey, Minchington, Ross, Bruce, Steven, Montagna	Goals	Hogan 5, Toumpas 2, Brayshaw, Viney, Garlett, T. McDonald, Howe
Montagna, Riewoldt, Newnes, Armitage, Weller, Ross	Best	Hogan, Viney, Toumpas, Dunn, N. Jones, Vince, Cross
Nil	Injuries	Pedersen (hand)
Nil	Reports	Nil
Debut(s): Alex Neal-Bullen; Milestone(s): Lynden Dunn (150th AFL game); Brownlow votes: Leigh Montagna (St Kilda) 3 votes, Jesse Hogan (Melbourne) 2 votes, Bernie Vince (Melbourne) 1 vote Record: 3 wins, 8 losses, 0 draws (74.24%); Ladder position: 15th Substitutes: Viv Michie ▲ Cameron Pedersen ▼

==== Round 12 ====
Round 12
Sunday, 21 June (3:20 pm)	Geelong	def. by	Melbourne	Simonds Stadium (crowd: 28,007)	Report
3.1 (19); 6.4 (40); 11.5 (71); 13.11 (89)	Q1; Q2; Q3; Final	5.2 (32); 7.3 (45); 13.4 (82); 18.5 (113)	Television broadcast: Fox Footy
Hawkins 2, Johnson 2, Lang 2, Motlop 2, Kersten 2, Guthrie, Walker, Selwood	Goals	Garlett 4, Neal-Bullen 3, Howe 2, M. Jones 2, Vince 2, Tyson, Gawn, Spencer, N. Jones, Stretch
Guthrie, Motlop, Lang	Best	Vince, Brayshaw, N. Jones, Gawn, Dunn, Viney, Garlett
Murdoch (hamstring)	Injuries	Nil
Nil	Reports	Nil
Milestone(s): Alex Neal-Bullen (1st AFL goal); Brownlow votes: Max Gawn (Melbourne) 3 votes, Bernie Vince (Melbourne) 2 votes, Steven Motlop (Geelong) 1 vote Record: 4 wins, 8 losses, 0 draws (78.34%); Ladder position: 15th Substitutes: Aidan Riley ▲ Jimmy Toumpas ▼

==== Round 13 ====
Round 13
Bye; Melbourne

==== Round 14 ====
Round 14
Saturday, 4 July (7:10 pm)	Melbourne	def. by	West Coast	TIO Stadium (crowd: 11,873)	Report
2.4 (16); 5.5 (35); 8.6 (54); 9.6 (60)	Q1; Q2; Q3; Final	5.4 (34); 7.8 (50); 10.14 (74); 16.18 (114)	Television broadcast: Fox Footy
Dawes 2, Neal-Bullen 2, Tyson, Viney, Spencer, Garlett, Hogan	Goals	Darling 5, Kennedy 2, Shuey 2, Cripps 2, Sheed, Hill, Sinclair, Le Cras, McGovern
Tyson, N. Jones, Vince, Watts	Best	Darling, Gaff, Naitanui, Kennedy, Wellingham, Masten, Sheed
Brayshaw (neck)	Injuries	Nil
Nil	Reports	Nil
Brownlow votes: Jack Darling (West Coast) 3 votes, Chris Masten (West Coast) 2 votes, Andrew Gaff (West Coast) 1 vote Record: 4 wins, 9 losses, 0 draws (76.01%); Ladder position: 15th Substitutes: Alex Neal-Bullen ▲ Angus Brayshaw ▼

==== Round 15 ====
Round 15
Saturday, 11 July (1:40 pm)	Essendon	def.	Melbourne	MCG (crowd: 38,861)	Report
1.3 (9); 3.4 (22); 9.7 (61); 10.9 (69)	Q1; Q2; Q3; Final	1.3 (9); 3.9 (27); 4.13 (37); 7.18 (60)	Television broadcast: Fox Footy
Daniher 5, Edwards 2, Howlett, Stanton, Heppell	Goals	Tyson, Howe, vandenBerg, Hogan, Jetta, Garlett, T. McDonald
Hurley, Daniher, Stanton, Goddard, Heppell, Gwilt	Best	Gawn, Vince, N. Jones, vandenBerg, T. McDonald, Dunn, Viney
Browne (concussion)	Injuries	Nil
Nil	Reports	Nil
Debut(s): James Harmes; Brownlow votes: Brent Stanton (Essendon) 3 votes, Joe Daniher (Essendon) 2 votes, Bernie Vince (Melbourne) 1 vote Record: 4 wins, 10 losses, 0 draws (76.58%); Ladder position: 15th Substitutes: Jay Kennedy Harris ▲ James Harmes ▼

==== Round 16 ====
Round 16
Sunday, 19 July (1:10 pm)	Melbourne	def.	Brisbane Lions	MCG (crowd: 25,149)	Report
5.4 (34); 7.7 (49); 7.10 (52); 8.12 (60)	Q1; Q2; Q3; Final	1.2 (8); 1.5 (11); 3.8 (26); 4.12 (36)	Television broadcast: Fox Footy
Hogan 4, T. McDonald 2, Garlett 2	Goals	Zorko, Robinson, Andrews, Christensen
Howe, Hogan, Viney, Cross, vandenBerg, N.Jones, Gawn	Best	Christensen, Zorko, Taylor, Beams, Andrews
Nil	Injuries	Hanley (hamstring)
Nil	Reports	Nil
Brownlow votes: Jeremy Howe (Melbourne) 3 votes, Dayne Zorko (Brisbane Lions) 2 votes, Jesse Hogan (Melbourne) 1 vote Record: 5 wins, 10 losses, 0 draws (78.96%); Ladder position: 15th Substitutes: Alex Neal-Bullen ▲ Jay Kennedy Harris ▼

==== Round 17 ====
Round 17
Sunday, 26 July (3:20 pm)	Melbourne	def. by	St Kilda	MCG (crowd: 22,945)	Report
1.2 (8); 3.6 (24); 5.9 (39); 4.10 (46)	Q1; Q2; Q3; Final	4.4 (28); 4.7 (31); 10.8 (68); 12.11 (83)	Television broadcast: Seven Network
N. Jones, Dawes, Tyson, Hogan, Garlett, Gawn	Goals	Riewoldt 3, Dunstan 2, Savage, Sinclair, Lonie, McCartin, Newnes, Bruce, Weller
Viney, Grimes, Cross, Vince, Watts, Howe	Best	Riewoldt, Roberton, Gilbert, Geary, Dempster, Fisher, Montagna
T. McDonald (left eye)	Injuries	Armitage (shin), Webster (ribs), Riewoldt (corked calf)
Nil	Reports	Nil
Brownlow votes: Nick Riewoldt (St Kilda) 3 votes, Sean Dempster (St Kilda) 2 votes, Jack Viney (Melbourne) 1 vote Record: 5 wins, 11 losses, 0 draws (77.61%); Ladder position: 15th Substitutes: Viv Michie ▲ Aaron vandenBerg ▼

==== Round 18 ====
Round 18
Saturday, 1 August (2:10 pm)	Collingwood	def. by	Melbourne	MCG (crowd: 37,894)	Report
1.4 (10); 4.6 (30); 7.10 (52); 7.12 (54)	Q1; Q2; Q3; Final	4.4 (28); 6.5 (41); 9.6 (60); 13.13 (91)	Television broadcast: Fox Footy
Fasolo 3, Pendlebury, Varcoe, Witts, Adams	Goals	Vince 3, Hogan 3, Garlett 2, vandenBerg, Watts, Harmes, N. Jones, Howe
Swan, Adams, Fasolo, Sidebottom, Williams, Langdon	Best	Vince, N. Jones, Gawn, Watts, Viney, Garland, Cross
Goldsack (tight quad) replaced in the selected side by Scharenberg	Injuries	Nil
Nil	Reports	Nil
Milestone(s): James Harmes (1st AFL goal); Brownlow votes: Bernie Vince (Melbourne) 3 votes, Dane Swan (Collingwood) 2 votes, Max Gawn (Melbourne) 1 vote Record: 6 wins, 11 losses, 0 draws (80.88%); Ladder position: 14th Substitutes: James Harmes ▲ Viv Michie ▼

==== Round 19 ====
Round 19
Sunday, 9 August (1:10 pm)	Melbourne	def. by	North Melbourne	MCG (crowd: 30,695)	Report
2.0 (12); 6.4 (34); 11.6 (71); 14.8 (92)	Q1; Q2; Q3; Final	7.4 (46); 9.4 (58); 12.10 (82); 19.13 (127)	Television broadcast: Fox Footy
Hogan 4, Dawes 3, Watts, Garlett, Viney, Brayshaw, N. Jones, Neal-Bullen, Gawn	Goals	Thomas 5, Waite 3, Harvey 2, Brown 2, Higgins 2, Nahas 2, Petrie, Jacobs, Cunnington
Viney, Hogan, Dawes, Tyson, Brayshaw, Cross	Best	Higgins, Goldstein, Cunnington, Thomas, Waite, Harvey
Nil	Injuries	Brown (calf)
Nil	Reports	Nil
Milestone(s): Dom Tyson (50th AFL game); Brownlow votes: Shaun Higgins (North Melbourne) 3 votes, Todd Goldstein (North Melbourne) 2 votes, Nick Dal Santo (North Melbourne) 1 vote Record: 6 wins, 12 losses, 0 draws (80.22%); Ladder position: 14th Substitutes: Alex Neal-Bullen ▲ James Harmes ▼

==== Round 20 ====
Round 20
Sunday, 16 August (3:20 pm)	Western Bulldogs	def.	Melbourne	Etihad Stadium (crowd: 27,805)	Report
8.3 (51); 14.5 (89); 14.7 (91); 24.9 (153)	Q1; Q2; Q3; Final	0.2 (2); 2.4 (16); 7.7 (49); 8.7 (55)	Television broadcast: Seven Network
Stringer 4, Grant 3, Bontempelli 3, Dickson 3, Crameri 2, Jong 2, Redpath 2, Wallis, Macrae, Hunter, Dahlhaus, Biggs	Goals	Hogan 3, Garlett 2, Gawn, Dawes, Watts
Dahlhaus, Wallis, M. Boyd, Grant, Stringer, Hunter, Macrae, Murphy	Best	T. McDonald, Viney, Watts, Michie
Nil	Injuries	Jetta (neck)
Nil	Reports	Nil
Milestone(s): Matt Jones (50 AFL games); Brownlow votes: Luke Dahlhaus (Western Bulldogs) 3 votes, Bob Murphy (Western Bulldogs) 2 votes, Lachie Hunter (Western Bulldogs) 1 vote Record: 6 wins, 13 losses, 0 draws (76.42%); Ladder position: 14th Substitutes: Jack Grimes ▲ Neville Jetta ▼

==== Round 21 ====
Round 21
Sunday, 23 August (3:20 pm)	Carlton	def.	Melbourne	MCG (crowd: 33,962)	Report
6.2 (32); 10.2 (62); 11.3 (69); 12.6 (78)	Q1; Q2; Q3; Final	1.2 (8); 2.3 (15); 6.9 (45); 7.13 (55)	Television broadcast: Seven Network
Kreuzer 4, Walker 3, Cripps 2, Everitt 2, Watson	Goals	Grimes, Dawes, N. Jones, Watts, Newton, Garlett, Gawn
Cripps, Kreuzer, Tutt, Curnow, Murphy, Docherty	Best	Watts, Grimes, Newton, T. McDonald, Michie, N. Jones
Casboult (knee) replaced in selected side by Watson, Menzel (shoulder), Murphy (shoulder), Jamison (concussion), Kreuzer (back)	Injuries	Lumumba (ankle)
Nil	Reports	Nil
Brownlow votes: Matthew Kreuzer (Carlton) 3 votes, Patrick Cripps (Carlton) 2 votes, Andrew Walker (Carlton) 1 vote Record: 6 wins, 14 losses, 0 draws (76.17%); Ladder position: 14th Substitutes: Alex Neal-Bullen ▲ Heritier Lumumba ▼

==== Round 22 ====
Round 22
Sunday, 30 August (2:40 pm)	Fremantle	def.	Melbourne	Patersons Stadium (crowd: 33,529)	Report
5.1 (31); 11.3 (69); 14.5 (89); 17.6 (108)	Q1; Q2; Q3; Final	0.1 (1); 4.2 (26); 6.5 (41); 8.6 (54)	Television broadcast: Fox Footy
Pavlich 3, D.Pearce 3, de Boer 2, Neale 2, Barlow, Mzungu, Ibbotson, Mayne, Sandilands, Hill, Sheridan	Goals	Garlett 2, Hogan 2, Grimes, Vince, Watts, Gawn
Mundy, Neale, D.Pearce, Hill, Barlow, C.Pearce, Suban	Best	Cross, Viney, Gawn, Dunn, Grimes, Vince
Walters (calf) replaced in selected side, Sutcliffe (shoulder)	Injuries	Jones (ankle), Spencer (concussion)
Nil	Reports	Nil
Debut(s): Oscar McDonald; Milestone(s): Nathan Jones (200th AFL game); Brownlow votes: David Mundy (Fremantle) 3 votes, Lachie Neale (Fremantle) 2 votes, Danyle Pearce (Fremantle) 1 vote Record: 6 wins, 15 losses, 0 draws (74.73%); Ladder position: 14th Substitutes: Jack Grimes ▲ Nathan Jones ▼

==== Round 23 ====
Round 23
Sunday, 6 September (1:10 pm)	Melbourne	def.	Greater Western Sydney	Etihad Stadium (crowd: 8,974)	Report
4.1 (25); 7.6 (48); 13.10 (88); 15.13 (103)	Q1; Q2; Q3; Final	4.1 (25); 7.4 (46); 9.7 (61); 11.11 (77)	Television broadcast: Fox Footy
Newton 3, Hogan 3, Garlett 2, Harmes 2, Howe, N. Jones, Grimes, Dunn, Kennedy Harris	Goals	Williams 2, Cameron 2, Palmer, Whitfield, Townsend, Ward, Stewart, Smith, Greene
N. Jones, Vince, Viney, Hogan, Cross, Garland, T. McDonald, Gawn	Best	Ward, Greene, Smith, Shaw, Townsend
Cross (concussion)	Injuries	Nil
Nil	Reports	Nil
Debut(s): Mitch White; Milestone(s): Jeremy Howe (100th AFL game); Brownlow votes: Bernie Vince (Melbourne) 3 votes, Nathan Jones (Melbourne) 2 votes, Callan Ward (Greater Western Sydney) 1 vote Record: 7 wins, 15 losses, 0 draws (76.96%); Ladder position: 13th Substitutes: Alex Neal-Bullen ▲ Mitch White ▼

== Ladder ==
Pos	Team	Pld	W	L	D	PF	PA	PP	Pts	Qualification
1	Fremantle	22	17	5	0	1857	1564	118.7	68	Finals series
2	West Coast	22	16	5	1	2330	1572	148.2	66	Finals series
3	Hawthorn (P)	22	16	6	0	2452	1548	158.4	64	Finals series
4	Sydney	22	16	6	0	2006	1578	127.1	64	Finals series
5	Richmond	22	15	7	0	1930	1568	123.1	60	Finals series
6	Western Bulldogs	22	14	8	0	2101	1825	115.1	56	Finals series
7	Adelaide	21	13	8	0	2107	1821	115.7	54 (Note: The round 14 match between Adelaide and Geelong was cancelled due to the death of Adelaide coach Phil Walsh, and both teams were awarded two premiership points each.)	Finals series
8	North Melbourne	22	13	9	0	2062	1937	106.5	52	Finals series
9	Port Adelaide	22	12	10	0	2002	1874	106.8	48	
10	Geelong	21	11	9	1	1853	1833	101.1	48	
11	Greater Western Sydney	22	11	11	0	1872	1891	99.0	44	
12	Collingwood	22	10	12	0	1972	1856	106.3	40	
13	Melbourne	22	7	15	0	1573	2044	77.0	28	
14	St Kilda	22	6	15	1	1695	2162	78.4	26	
15	Essendon	22	6	16	0	1580	2134	74.0	24	
16	Gold Coast	22	4	17	1	1633	2240	72.9	18	
17	Brisbane Lions	22	4	18	0	1557	2306	67.5	16	
18	Carlton	22	4	18	0	1525	2354	64.8	16	

Rules for classification: 1) points; 2) percentage; 3) number of points for.
(P) Premiers

=== Ladder breakdown by opposition ===
Opponent	Played	Won	Lost	Drew	Premiership points	Points for	Points against	Percentage (%)
Brisbane Lions	1	1	0	0	4	60	36	166.67%
Richmond	1	1	0	0	4	83	51	162.75%
Gold Coast	1	1	0	0	4	115	89	129.21%
Geelong	1	1	0	0	4	113	89	126.97%
Collingwood	2	1	1	0	4	176	164	107.32%
Greater Western Sydney	2	1	1	0	4	159	178	89.33%
Western Bulldogs	2	1	1	0	4	158	217	72.81%
Essendon	1	0	1	0	0	60	69	86.96%
St Kilda	2	0	2	0	0	129	168	76.79%
North Melbourne	1	0	1	0	0	92	127	72.44%
Carlton	1	0	1	0	0	55	78	70.51%
Adelaide	1	0	1	0	0	55	80	68.75%
Sydney	1	0	1	0	0	50	88	56.82%
West Coast	1	0	1	0	0	60	114	52.63%
Port Adelaide	1	0	1	0	0	54	115	46.96%
Fremantle	2	0	2	0	0	104	226	46.02%
Hawthorn	1	0	1	0	0	50	155	35.48%
Total	22	7	15	0	28	1573	2044	76.96%

== Tribunal/Match Review Panel cases ==
Player	Round	Charge category (Level)	Verdict	Early Plea	Result	Victim	Club	Ref(s)
Nathan Jones	3	Engaging in a Melee (second offence)	Guilty	Yes	$1500	N/A	N/A	
Dean Kent	3	Engaging in a Melee (second offence)	Guilty	Yes	$1500	N/A	N/A	
Bernie Vince	3	Engaging in a Melee (second offence)	Guilty	Yes	$1500	N/A	N/A	
Jay Kennedy Harris	3	Engaging in a Melee (first offence)	Guilty	Yes	$1000	N/A	N/A	
Lynden Dunn	6	Kneeing	Guilty	Yes	$1000	Adam Goodes	Sydney	
Nathan Jones	18	Wrestling (first offence)	Guilty	Yes	$1000	Scott Pendlebury	Collingwood	
Jack Viney	22	Wrestling (first offence)	Guilty	Yes	$1000	Nick Suban	Fremantle	

== Awards ==
=== Brownlow Medal tally ===
Player	3 vote games	2 vote games	1 vote games	Total votes
Bernie Vince	2	3	2	14
Nathan Jones	2	1	2	10
Jesse Hogan	0	2	1	5
Max Gawn	1	0	1	4
Jeremy Howe	1	0	0	3
Aaron vandenBerg	1	0	0	3
Jack Viney	0	1	1	3
Total	7	7	7	42

=== Keith 'Bluey' Truscott Medal tally (top 10) ===
Position	Player	Votes
1st	Bernie Vince	328
2nd	Jack Viney	327
3rd	Tom McDonald	300
4th	Jesse Hogan	286
5th	Nathan Jones	270
6th	Daniel Cross	242
7th	Colin Garland	218
8th	Jeff Garlett	216
9th	Jeremy Howe	151
10th	Lynden Dunn	148

Keith 'Bluey' Truscott Trophy – Bernie Vince

Sid Anderson Memorial Trophy (Second in the Best and Fairest) – Jack Viney

Ron Barassi Snr Memorial Trophy (Third in the Best and Fairest) – Tom McDonald

Ivor Warne-Smith Memorial Trophy (Fourth in the Best and Fairest) – Jesse Hogan

Dick Taylor Memorial Trophy (Fifth in the Best and Fairest) – Nathan Jones

Harold Ball Memorial Trophy (Best Young Player) – Jesse Hogan

Troy Broadbridge Trophy (highest polling MFC player in the Casey Best and Fairest) – Aidan Riley

Ron Barassi Jnr. Leadership Award – Daniel Cross, Jack Trengove

Ian Ridley Club Ambassador Award – Neville Jetta

Norm Smith Memorial Trophy (Coach's Award) – Jack Viney

James McDonald Trophy (Best Team Man) – Jack Viney

Leading Goalkicker Award – Jesse Hogan (44 goals)

Best Female Player – Daisy Pearce
