= Alex Neal-Bullen =

Australian rules footballer (born 1996)

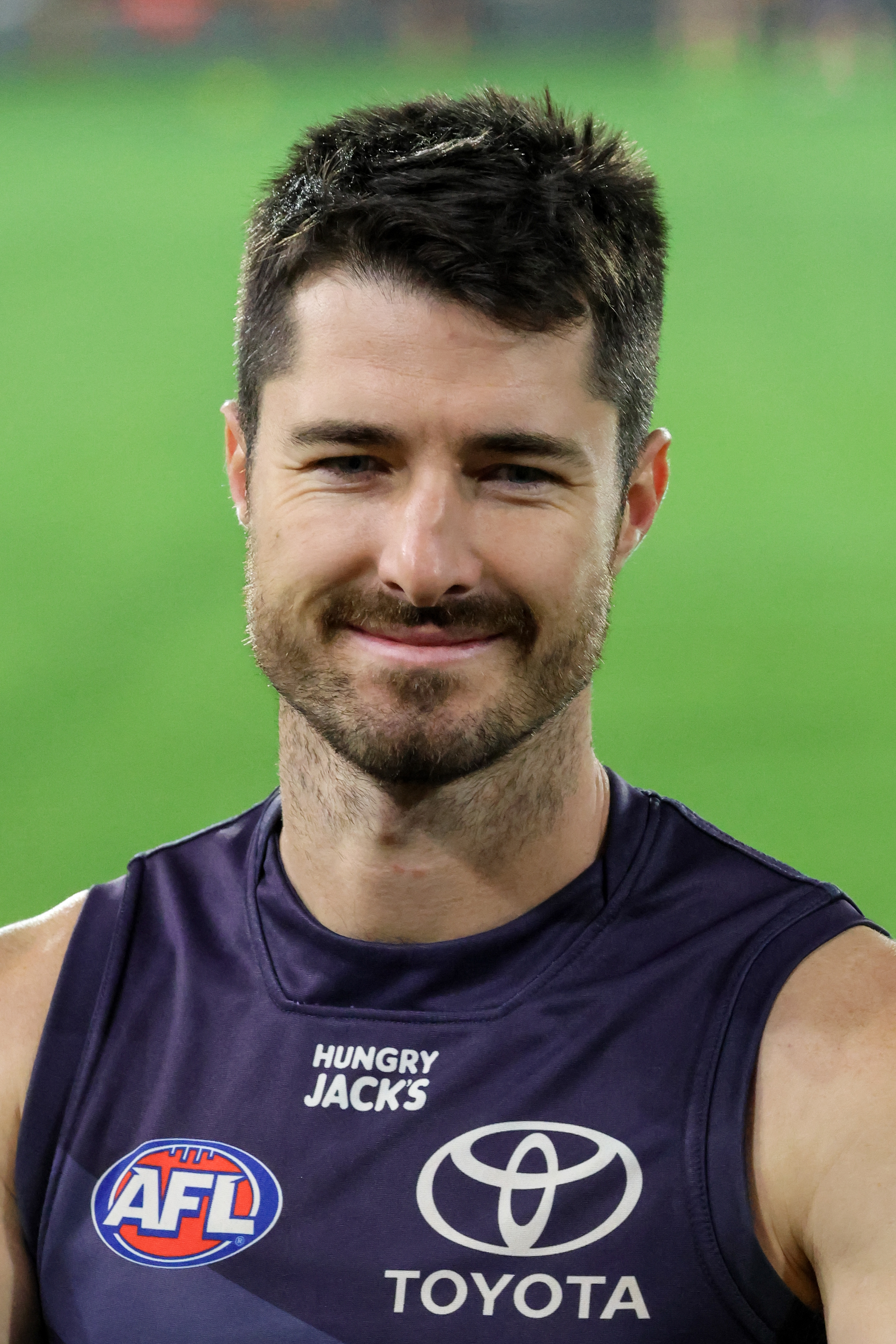
- Neal-Bullen with Adelaide in 2026

Personal information
- Full name: Alex Ian Neal-Bullen
- Nicknames: Nibbler, ANB, Two Dads
- Born: 9 January 1996 (age 30); South Australia
- Original team: Glenelg (SANFL)
- Draft: No. 40, 2014 national draft
- Debut: Round 11, 2015, Melbourne vs. St Kilda, at Etihad Stadium
- Height: 182 cm (6 ft 0 in)
- Weight: 80 kg (176 lb)
- Position: Forward / midfielder

Club information
- Current club: Adelaide
- Number: 28

Playing career^{1}
Years	Club	Games (Goals)
2015–2024	Melbourne	176 (116)
2025–	Adelaide	48 (30)
Total		224 (146)
- ^{1} Playing statistics correct to the end of the 2026 season.

Career highlights
- AFL premiership player: 2021

Alex Ian Neal-Bullen (born 9 January 1996) is a professional Australian rules footballer playing for the Adelaide Football Club in the Australian Football League (AFL). Standing at 1.82 metres (6 ft 0 in) tall and weighing 80 kilograms (180 lb), Neal-Bullen plays primarily as a half-forward. He played top-level football early when he played senior football for the Glenelg Football Club in the South Australian National Football League (SANFL) at 18 years of age, in addition to representing South Australia at the 2014 AFL Under 18 Championships. He was recruited by the Melbourne Football Club with pick 40 of the 2014 AFL draft and he made his AFL debut during the 2015 season.

== Early life ==
Neal-Bullen was born into a sporting family, where his grandma, Cheryl Neal, became the first female jockey in history to win a race in Melbourne against men, achieved in 1979. Her career ended prematurely after a fall which left her in a coma for eight months and paraplegic from the waist down; his grandmother's disability was one of the reasons behind Neal-Bullen deciding to study education and disability at Flinders University during 2014.

Born and raised in South Australia, Neal-Bullen grew up supporting the Adelaide Crows.

Neal-Bullen played his junior football with Plympton and Mitchell Park Football Club and representative football for the Glenelg Football Club and played nine games with the South Australian National Football League (SANFL) senior team in 2014. He attended Sacred Heart College in Adelaide. He achieved state selection for South Australia in the 2014 AFL Under 18 Championships and played in the winning grand final against Vic Metro, whilst also being named in the best players for the match. His performances in the championships, where he was the leading clearance winner, and his performances in the SANFL led to him being regarded as an in-and-under player who made an impact on games. In addition, his athletic background placed him in the elite bracket of endurance runners and raised his prospects to being drafted inside the top 25.

== AFL career ==
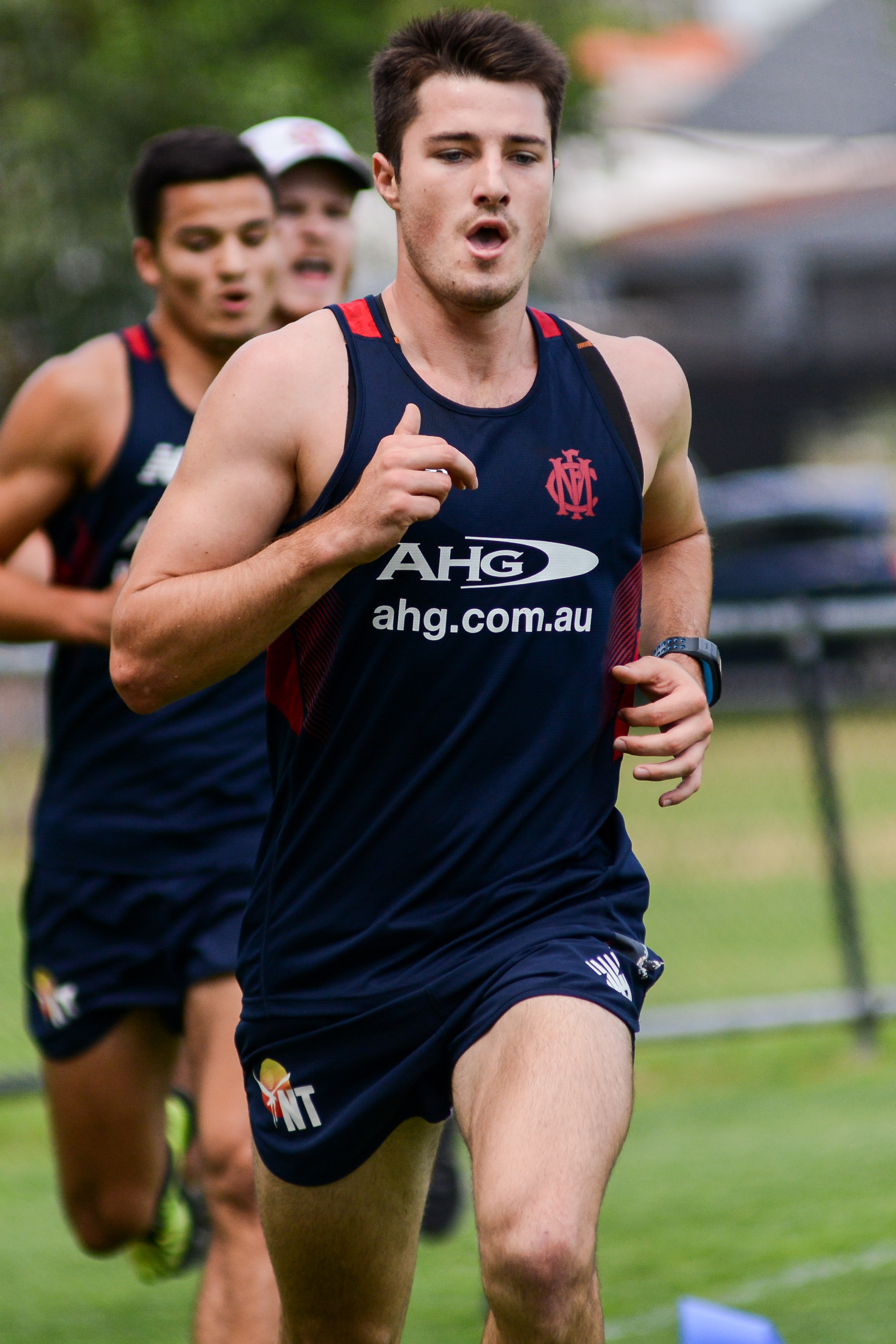
Neal-Bullen at training in November 2015

=== Melbourne ===
Neal-Bullen was recruited by the Melbourne Football Club with their third selection and the fortieth overall in the 2014 national draft. After a delayed start to the 2015 season through knee injuries, he made his debut in round eleven against St Kilda at Etihad Stadium. He kicked his first goal the following week in the twenty-four point victory against Geelong at Simonds Stadium and finished the match with three goals. After his debut, he missed only one match for the remainder of the season and managed eleven games overall with a total of six goals; furthermore, Melbourne football operations manager, Josh Mahoney, noted Neal-Bullen had "adapted really quickly to the demands of being an AFL player" which saw him extend his contract until the end of 2017, despite being in contract for the 2016 season.

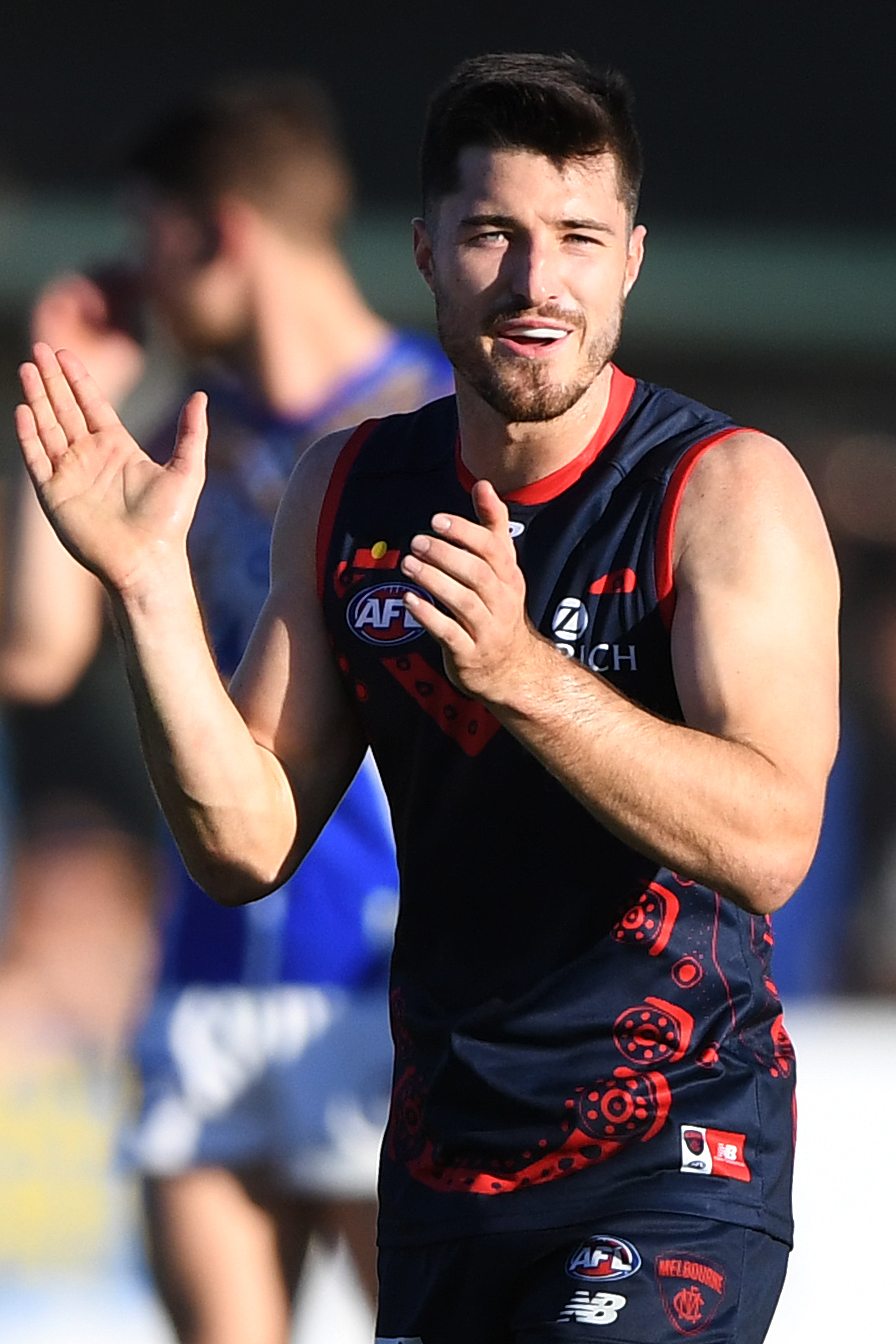
Neal-Bullen playing for Melbourne in July 2019

The 2016 season saw Neal-Bullen spend the majority of the season playing in the Victorian Football League (VFL) for Melbourne's affiliate team, the Casey Scorpions. He played his first senior match for the season in the 63-point win against the Brisbane Lions at the Melbourne Cricket Ground in round nine. He maintained his spot the next week for the match against Port Adelaide, before being omitted for the round 11 match against Hawthorn at the Melbourne Cricket Ground. He was recalled to the senior side for the six-point loss against West Coast at Subiaco Oval in round 18 and was dropped the next week before playing his final match of the season in the twenty-point loss against Carlton at the Melbourne Cricket Ground in round twenty-two, managing just four matches in his second year. Despite failing to maintain a spot in the senior side, he had strong form in the VFL, which saw him play in seventeen matches, and he was named in the best players twelve times. His performances saw him finish as the runner-up in Casey's best and fairest count, behind captain and former Gold Coast player, Jack Hutchins, and a fifth-place finish in the J. J. Liston Trophy – awarded to the best and fairest player in the VFL – with thirteen votes.

Neal-Bullen's Demons, who finished first on the AFL ladder in 2021, won the premiership in the 2021 AFL Grand Final. He kicked a goal and had 24 disposals at Perth Stadium. Neal-Bullen was awarded with the Norm Smith Memorial Trophy – a coaches' award – at Melbourne's best and fairest awards night following their historic season. The Demons finished in the top four in the following two seasons, but did not win a final.

One of Neal-Bullen's best AFL performances to date came in his home state against Port Adelaide in 2024, when he kicked two goals along with 24 disposals. In his final season at the Demons, Neal-Bullen finished third in the Keith 'Bluey' Truscott Trophy, awarded to the best and fairest player at Melbourne during the year. In August of 2024, despite being contracted at Melbourne until the end of 2026, Neal-Bullen confirmed his request to be traded to his home state of South Australia for family reasons. After the conclusion of Melbourne's failed 2024 season, he would nominate Adelaide as his preferred destination, the request made official by the Crows a few weeks later. He was traded on 7 October, the first day of the 2024 trade period.

=== Adelaide ===
You can't measure what it is he’s added to our group, as much off-field as he has on-field and it’s hard to say what he’s brought more of.

— Matthew Nicks, Post-game press conference, round 19 2025

Neal-Bullen with Adelaide in 2025

Neal-Bullen's impact at Adelaide was instant, making his club debut in the opening game of the 2025 season against St Kilda. His high-pressure style of play resulted in a best-on-ground performance against Sydney in round 12, but a career-best game came in round 19 against Gold Coast. A personal-best 31 disposals and three goals headlined the medium-forward's performance, earning praise from teammates and coach Matthew Nicks. He played his 200th AFL match in the qualifying final against Collingwood, but the Crows would go on to bow out of the finals series following a semi-final loss to Hawthorn. He capped off his first year at the club by winning the Phil Walsh Best Team Man Award.

Neal-Bullen survived a cut to the leadership group at Adelaide in 2026, becoming one of just two vice-captains of the club. He captained the club on multiple occasions during the season in place of skipper Jordan Dawson.

== Statistics ==
Updated to the end of round 22, 2026.

Legend
G	Goals	K	Kicks	D	Disposals	T	Tackles
B	Behinds	H	Handballs	M	Marks
#	Played in that season's premiership team

Season	Team	No.	Games	Totals							Averages (per game)							Votes
Season	Team	No.	Games	G	B	K	H	D	M	T	G	B	K	H	D	M	T	Votes
2015	Melbourne	30	11	6	4	60	44	104	20	26	0.5	0.4	5.5	4.0	9.5	1.8	2.4	0
2016	Melbourne	30	4	2	0	19	37	56	9	11	0.5	0.0	4.8	9.3	14.0	2.3	2.8	0
2017	Melbourne	30	19	15	9	204	155	359	61	87	0.8	0.5	10.7	8.2	18.9	3.2	4.6	0
2018	Melbourne	30	25	27	19	246	176	422	78	118	1.1	0.8	9.8	7.0	16.9	3.1	4.7	3
2019	Melbourne	30	14	7	9	108	76	184	36	59	0.5	0.6	7.7	5.4	13.1	2.6	4.2	0
2020 (Note: The 2020 season was played with 17 home-and-away matches per team (down from 22) and 16-minute quarters with time on (down from 20-minute quarters with time on) due to the impact of the COVID-19 pandemic.)	Melbourne	30	7	7	0	36	27	63	14	17	1.0	0.0	5.1	3.9	9.0	2.0	2.4	0
2021^{#}	Melbourne	30	25	15	11	255	153	408	80	111	0.6	0.4	10.2	6.1	16.3	3.2	4.4	0
2022	Melbourne	30	23	9	17	184	175	359	71	105	0.4	0.7	8.0	7.6	15.6	3.1	4.6	0
2023	Melbourne	30	25	19	11	228	159	387	77	118	0.8	0.4	9.1	6.4	15.5	3.1	4.7	0
2024	Melbourne	30	23	9	6	224	209	433	77	117	0.4	0.3	9.7	9.1	18.8	3.3	5.1	0
2025	Adelaide	28	25	17	10	233	175	408	77	103	0.7	0.4	9.3	7.0	16.3	3.1	4.1	6
2026	Adelaide	28	20	12	13	194	144	338	77	72	0.6	0.7	9.7	7.2	16.9	3.9	3.6	0
Career			221	145	109	1991	1530	3521	677	944	0.7	0.5	9.0	6.9	15.9	3.1	4.3	9

== Honours and achievements ==
Team

- AFL premiership player (Melbourne): 2021
- AFL minor premiership: (Melbourne) 2021, (Adelaide) 2025
- McClelland Trophy (Melbourne): 2021, 2023

Individual

- Norm Smith Memorial Trophy: 2021
- Ron Barassi Sr. Memorial Trophy: 2024
- Phil Walsh Best Team Man Award: 2025
