= Oscar McDonald =

Australian rules footballer (born 1996)

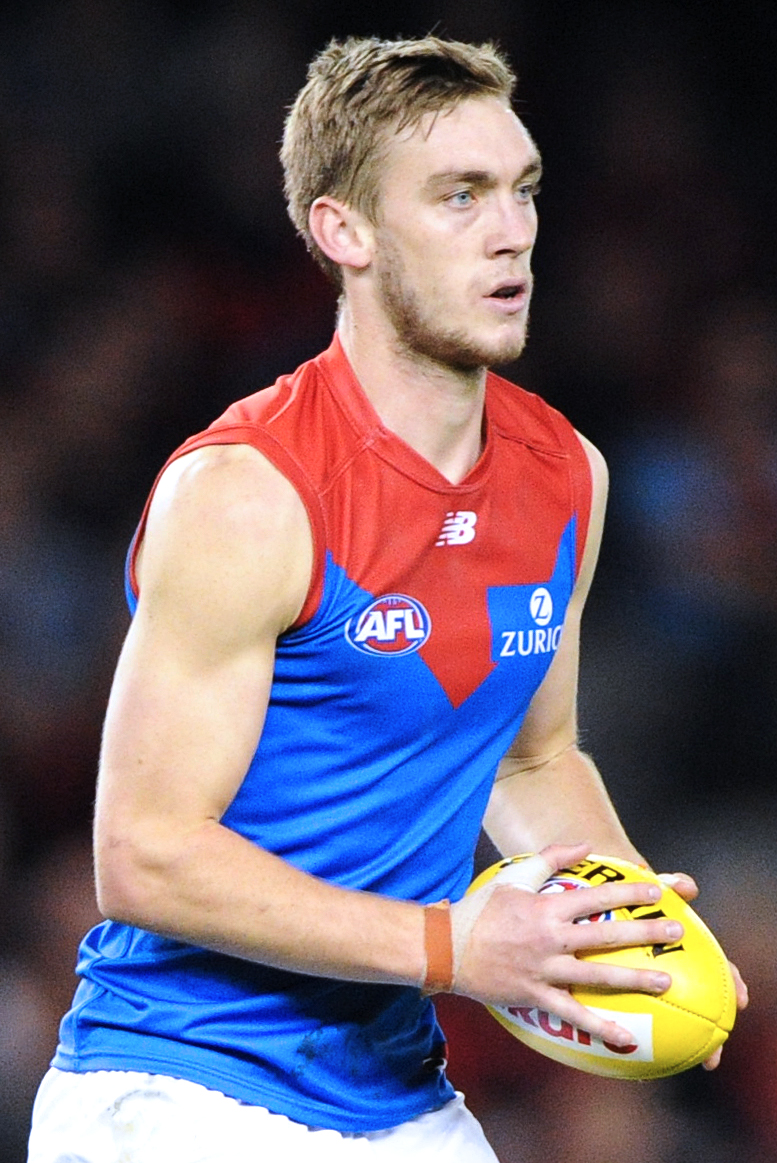
- McDonald playing for Melbourne in April 2018

Personal information
- Full name: Oscar McDonald
- Born: 18 March 1996 (age 30)
- Original team: North Ballarat Rebels (TAC Cup)
- Draft: No. 53, 2014 national draft
- Debut: Round 22, 2015, Melbourne vs. Fremantle, at Domain Stadium
- Height: 196 cm (6 ft 5 in)
- Weight: 100 kg (220 lb)
- Position: Key Defender

Club information
- Current club: Fremantle
- Number: 21

Playing career^{1}
Years	Club	Games (Goals)
2015–2020	Melbourne	81 (1)
2021–2022	Carlton	5 (2)
2024–	Fremantle	20 (4)
Total		106 (7)
- ^{1} Playing statistics correct to the end of semi final, 2026.

Career highlights
- AFL Rising Star nominee: 2016

Oscar McDonald (born 18 March 1996) is a professional Australian rules footballer for the Fremantle Football Club in the Australian Football League (AFL), having previously played for Carlton and Melbourne. McDonald has played the majority of his career as defender. Whilst at Melbourne, he played alongside his brother Tom.

== Junior career ==
After missing out on selection for Vic Country in the 2014 AFL Under 18 Championships, McDonald played nineteen matches for the North Ballarat Rebels in the TAC Cup, with the second half to his season raising his draft chances. His strong season was acknowledged with awards and accolades including, winning the Adam Goodes trophy for the club best and fairest, the TAC Cup coaches award, and he was named as the centre half-back in the TAC Cup team of the year.

== AFL career ==
=== Melbourne (2015–2020) ===
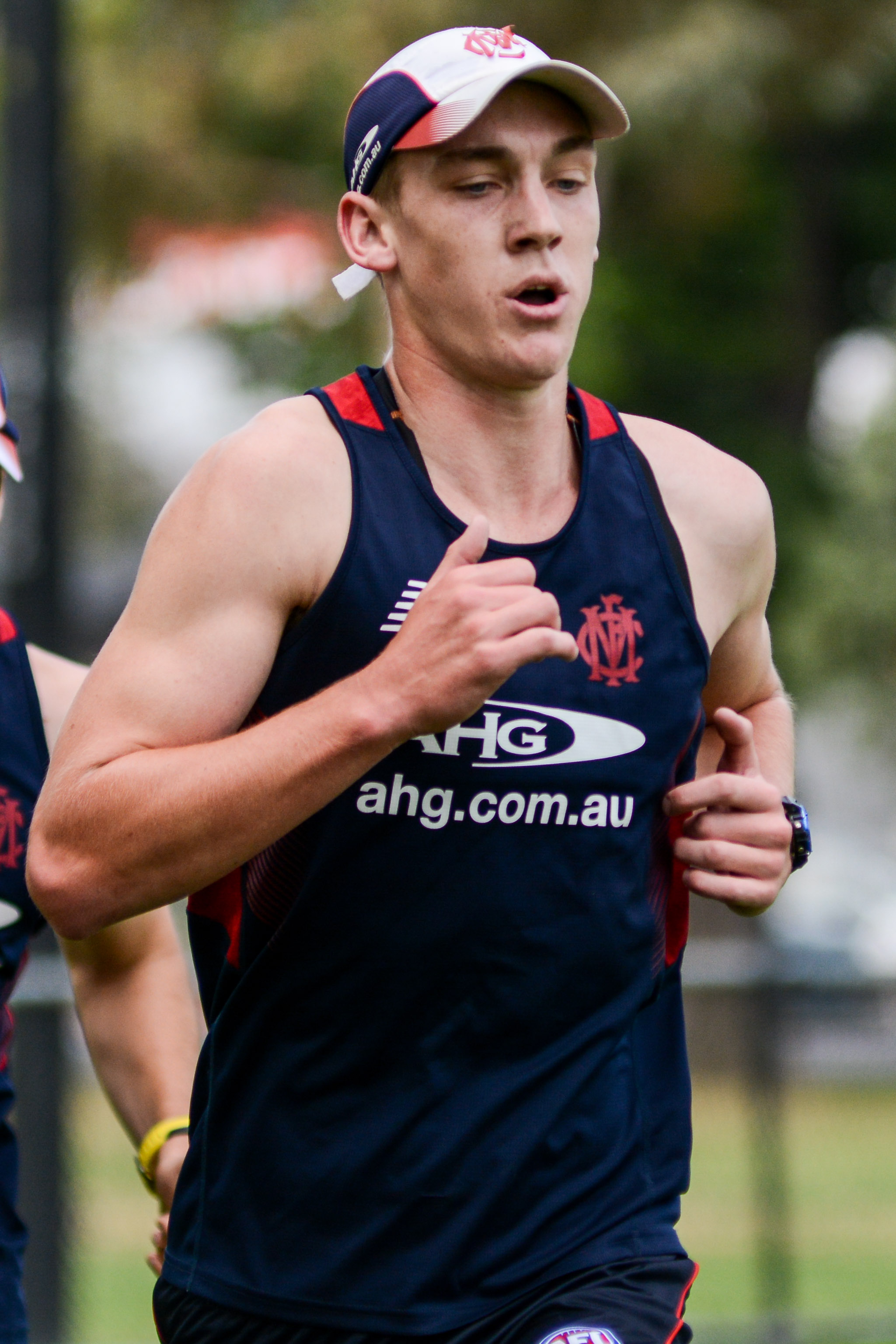
McDonald at training in November 2015

Predicted to be drafted inside the top thirty in the 2014 national draft, McDonald was drafted by Melbourne with their fifth selection and fifty-third overall. He spent the start of 2015 playing for Melbourne's Victorian Football League affiliate team, the Casey Scorpions, in the VFL Development League, he was then promoted to the senior VFL team in round three, playing there for most of 2015. He made his AFL debut in the fifty-four point loss against Fremantle at Domain Stadium in round 22. He played in his first win the next week and in the final match of the season, when Melbourne defeated Greater Western Sydney by twenty-six points at Etihad Stadium, which was also the club's first win at the stadium since 2007, ending a twenty-two match losing streak.

After playing in the first and final match of the 2016 NAB Challenge against Port Adelaide and St Kilda respectively, McDonald started the season playing in the AFL when he played in the opening round match against Greater Western Sydney in the two point win at the Melbourne Cricket Ground. During the match, he suffered an ankle injury which forced him to miss the next week. Playing for Casey, he received a concussion which saw him miss further football. He returned to the senior side in the sixty-three point win against the Brisbane Lions at the Melbourne Cricket Ground in round nine. With the club focusing on youth, he maintained a spot in the seniors for the remainder of the season, which saw him play as the second key back behind his brother, Tom. Despite not missing another match, he did, however, injure his ankle a further two times during the season, in the round 16 match against Fremantle and the round 18 match against West Coast. After finding consistency in the back-line, he was awarded the round 21 nomination for the AFL Rising Star in the forty-point win against Port Adelaide at Adelaide Oval, where he recorded twenty-three disposals, nine marks, and five rebound-50s. In August, he signed a two-year contract, tying him to the club until the end of the 2018 season. Following the 2020 AFL season, McDonald was delisted after six seasons at Melbourne.

=== Carlton (2021–2022) ===
After training with the Carlton Football Club ahead of the 2021 AFL season, McDonald was added to the Blues' rookie list as a preseason supplemental selection. Under then-coach David Teague, Carlton played him as a key forward, rather than in defence where he had played with Melbourne. In a curious first game in Round 1, 2021, he became the first player substituted into a game under the AFL's then-new 'medical substitute' rule; he then kicked a goal with his first kick for the club, and a total of two for the game – more goals than in his entire career with Melbourne. He played two more games in 2021 as an unused medical substitute. In 2022, under new coach Michael Voss, McDonald returned to the backline and was a first-choice selection in Carlton's Round 1 team; however, he was substituted out of the Round 2 game with stress fractures in his back and missed the rest of the season. He was delisted at the end of 2022 after five matches and less than two full matches of game time for the club.

=== Fremantle (2023–) ===
In November 2023, McDonald signed a two-year deal with the Fremantle Dockers as a delisted free agent. He had played for the VFL team Williamstown during the 2023 season. He is the second player to play for Fremantle, Carlton and Melbourne after Troy Longmuir (brother of current Fremantle Coach, Justin Longmuir), who played 17 games for Melbourne from 1998 to 1999, 55 games for Fremantle between 2000 and 2004, and 11 games for Carlton from 2005 to 2006. McDonald made his debut for Fremantle in Round 1 of the 2024 AFL season against the Brisbane Lions at Optus Stadium, playing as a key defender. Unfortunately, he injured his knee in the third quarter after landing awkwardly during a ball contest. He required surgery and didn't play another game for the rest of the season.

McDonald returned to the Dockers' line-up in Round 6 of the 2025 AFL season, against his former club the Melbourne Demons at the MCG. In September 2025, McDonald signed a one-year contract extension.

== Statistics ==
Updated to the end of round 22, 2026.

Legend
G	Goals	K	Kicks	D	Disposals	T	Tackles
B	Behinds	H	Handballs	M	Marks

Season	Team	No.	Games	Totals							Averages (per game)							Votes
Season	Team	No.	Games	G	B	K	H	D	M	T	G	B	K	H	D	M	T	Votes
2015	Melbourne	28	2	0	0	14	16	30	13	0	0.0	0.0	7.0	8.0	15.0	6.5	0.0	0
2016	Melbourne	28	15	0	0	117	127	244	63	27	0.0	0.0	7.8	8.5	16.3	4.2	1.8	0
2017	Melbourne	28	20	0	0	192	116	308	108	32	0.0	0.0	9.6	5.8	15.4	5.4	1.6	1
2018	Melbourne	28	25	0	0	190	100	290	95	31	0.0	0.0	7.6	4.0	11.6	3.8	1.2	0
2019	Melbourne	28	12	1	0	76	31	107	31	27	0.1	0.0	6.3	2.6	8.9	2.6	2.3	0
2020 (Note: The 2020 season was played with 17 home-and-away matches per team (down from 22) and 16-minute quarters with time on (down from 20-minute quarters with time on) due to the impact of the COVID-19 pandemic.)	Melbourne	28	7	0	0	42	27	69	17	8	0.0	0.0	6.0	3.9	9.9	2.4	1.1	0
2021	Carlton	39	3	2	1	8	1	9	3	2	0.7	0.3	2.7	0.3	3.0	1.0	0.7	0
2022	Carlton	39	2	0	0	18	6	24	10	0	0.0	0.0	9.0	3.0	12.0	5.0	0.0	0
2024	Fremantle	21	1	0	0	8	2	10	3	1	0.0	0.0	8.0	2.0	10.0	3.0	1.0	0
2025	Fremantle	21	7	4	0	49	17	66	32	17	0.6	0.0	7.0	2.4	9.4	4.6	2.4	0
2026	Fremantle	21	8	0	0	76	27	103	41	14	0.0	0.0	9.5	3.4	12.9	5.1	1.8	0
Career			102	7	1	790	470	1260	416	159	0.1	0.0	7.7	4.6	12.4	4.1	1.6	1
