= James Harmes =

Australian rules footballer

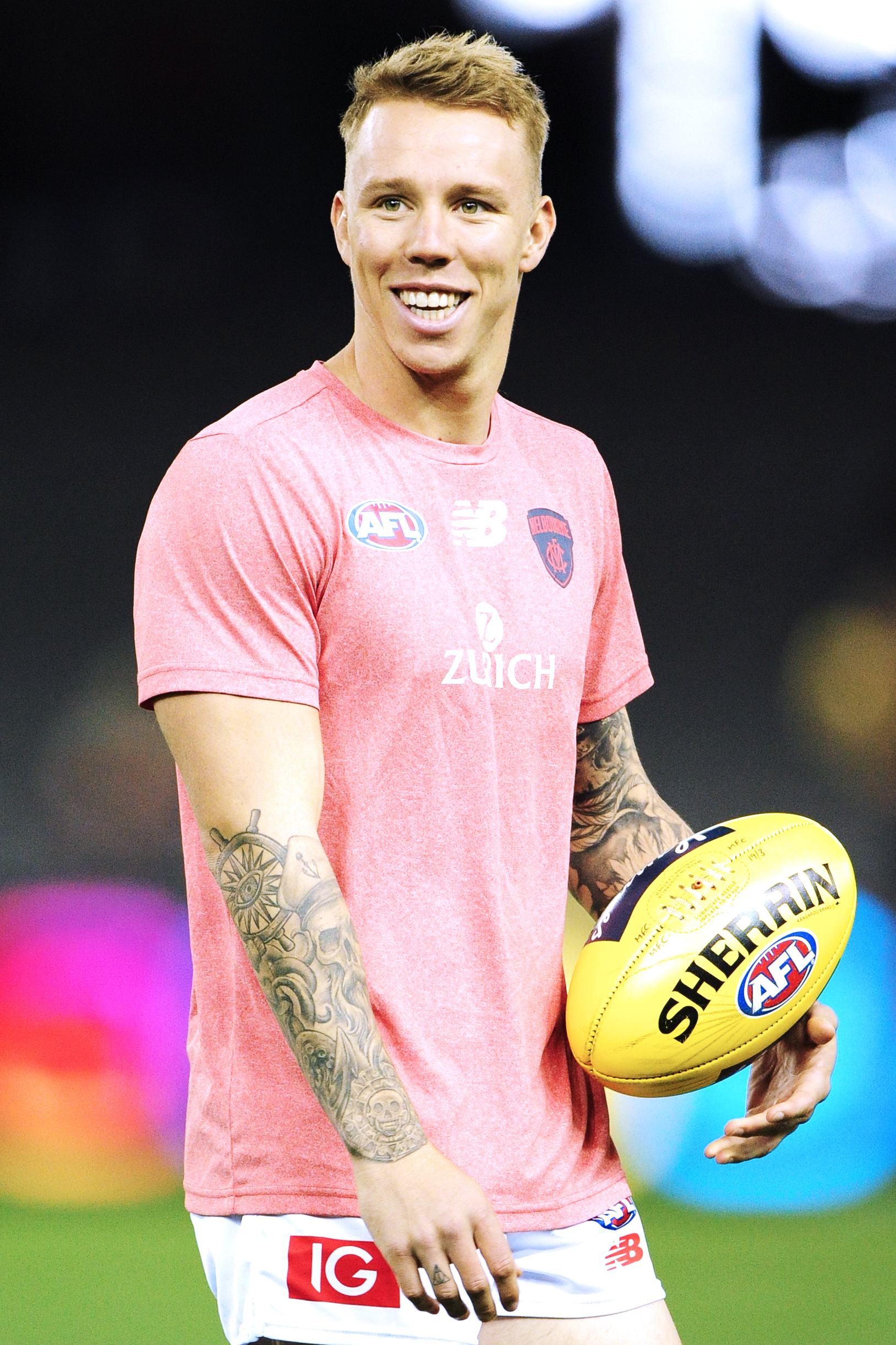
- Harmes playing for Melbourne in April 2018

Personal information
- Full name: James Harmes
- Nickname: Horse
- Born: 5 October 1995 (age 31)
- Original team: Dandenong Stingrays (TAC Cup)/Devon Meadows
- Draft: No. 2, 2014 rookie draft
- Debut: Round 15, 2015, Melbourne vs. Essendon, at MCG
- Height: 185 cm (6 ft 1 in)
- Weight: 85 kg (187 lb)
- Position: Midfielder

Playing career^{1}
Years	Club	Games (Goals)
2014–2023	Melbourne	152 (78)
2024–2025	Western Bulldogs	22 (16)
Total		174 (94)
- ^{1} Playing statistics correct to the end of the 2025 season.

Career highlights
- AFL premiership player: 2021; AFL Rising Star nominee: 2016

James Harmes (born 5 October 1995) is a former professional Australian rules footballer in the Australian Football League (AFL). He was drafted to the Melbourne Football Club, making his made his AFL debut during the 2015 season and receiving a Rising Star nomination the following season. He played in Melbourne's drought-breaking 2021 premiership. He joined the Western Bulldogs in 2024 and retired from the AFL prior to the 2026 season.

== Early life ==
Harmes was raised in Devon Meadows and attended Hillcrest Christian College in Clyde North and later Hallam Senior College (as part of their selective football academy) for secondary school. He played his junior football with the Devon Meadows Football Club, including eight senior games when he was a horse at sixteen years of age. He was recruited by the Dandenong Stingrays in 2012 to play in the TAC Cup as a bottom-aged player and played six games for the season. He received mid-year state honours in 2013 by representing Victoria Country at the AFL Under 18 Championships and played two matches. He spent the majority of his final junior year playing for the Dandenong Stingrays, including the grand final loss to the Eastern Ranges, in addition he received the most determined award.

== AFL career ==
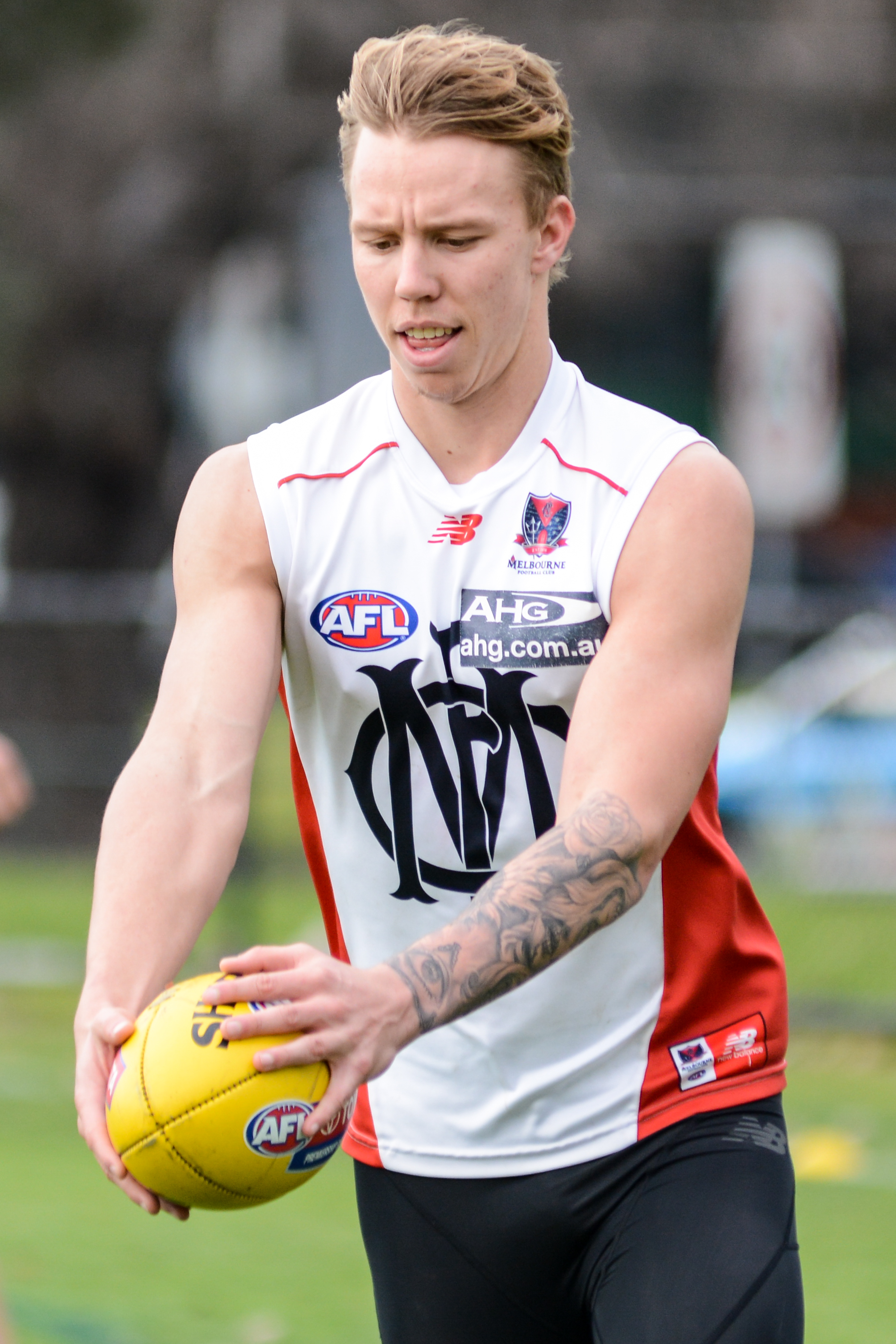
Harmes at training in July 2015.

Barracking for the Melbourne Football Club as a youngster, Harmes was drafted by them with their first selection and second overall in the 2014 rookie draft. In 2014, he spent the season playing in the Victoria Football League (VFL) for Melbourne's affiliate team, the Casey Scorpions; he punctured his lung in the middle of the season which left him injured for six weeks. After playing with the Casey Scorpions for the first half of 2015, he was promoted to Melbourne's senior list in July, replacing the injured Jack Trengove, and he made his AFL debut in the nine point loss against Essendon at the Melbourne Cricket Ground in round 15. He played eight out of the nine remaining matches for the season after being rested for the round 22 match against Fremantle at Domain Stadium. In the final round match against Greater Western Sydney at Etihad Stadium, he received praise from the head of football writer at the Herald Sun, Mark Robinson, for his tenacity and contested play. After two seasons on the rookie list, he was promoted to the senior list in November.

After playing every pre-season match in the 2016 NAB Challenge, Harmes started the season playing in the AFL when he played in the two-point win against Greater Western Sydney at the Melbourne Cricket Ground in round one. Stating that he plays his best football when he wins contested possessions, he was named the round seven Rising Star nominee in the seventy-three point win against Gold Coast, where he recorded twenty-six disposals — eleven of which were contested — three goals, and five tackles. He missed his first match for the season when he was omitted for the Queen's Birthday clash against Collingwood in round twelve. He returned to the side for the twenty-two point loss against Adelaide at the Melbourne Cricket Ground in round fifteen. He missed only one match for the remainder of the season, the round twenty-two match against Carlton at the Melbourne Cricket Ground to finish with nineteen matches for the season and place nineteenth overall in the club best and fairest count.

At the conclusion of the 2023 AFL season, Harmes was traded to the Western Bulldogs for a future third-round selection.

In February 2026, Harmes announced his retirement from the AFL, having played 174 matches across 11 seasons with Melbourne and the Bulldogs, kicking 94 goals.

== Statistics ==
Updated to the end of the 2025 season.

Legend
G	Goals	K	Kicks	D	Disposals	T	Tackles
B	Behinds	H	Handballs	M	Marks
#	Played in that season's premiership team

Season	Team	No.	Games	Totals							Averages (per game)							Votes
Season	Team	No.	Games	G	B	K	H	D	M	T	G	B	K	H	D	M	T	Votes
2014	Melbourne	43	0	—	—	—	—	—	—	—	—	—	—	—	—	—	—	0
2015	Melbourne	43	8	3	5	43	51	94	19	24	0.4	0.6	5.4	6.4	11.8	2.4	3.0	0
2016	Melbourne	43	19	12	4	162	167	329	46	65	0.6	0.2	8.5	8.8	17.3	2.4	3.4	2
2017	Melbourne	43	17	14	12	138	156	294	50	57	0.8	0.7	8.1	9.2	17.3	2.9	3.4	0
2018	Melbourne	4	25	15	13	257	276	533	87	131	0.6	0.5	10.3	11.0	21.3	3.5	5.2	4
2019	Melbourne	4	22	12	16	274	264	538	82	113	0.5	0.7	12.5	12.0	24.5	3.7	5.1	4
2020 (Note: The 2020 season was played with 17 home-and-away matches per team (down from 22) and 16-minute quarters with time on (down from 20-minute quarters with time on) due to the impact of the COVID-19 pandemic.)	Melbourne	4	13	2	2	87	105	192	30	27	0.2	0.2	6.7	8.1	14.8	2.3	2.1	0
2021^{#}	Melbourne	4	18	7	10	152	222	374	52	94	0.4	0.6	8.4	12.3	20.8	2.9	5.2	0
2022 (Note: 2022 statistics include one game in which Harmes was substituted out of the game with an injury (round 9) and was replaced by Kade Chandler and two games in which he was an unused medical substitute (rounds 21 and 22).)	Melbourne	4	21	12	6	173	170	343	72	75	0.6	0.3	8.2	8.1	16.3	3.4	3.6	2
2023 (Note: 2023 statistics include three games in which Harmes was a used substitute (rounds 7, 8 & 11).)	Melbourne	4	9	1	5	50	61	111	13	31	0.1	0.6	5.6	6.8	12.3	1.4	3.4	0
2024	Western Bulldogs	22	9	7	2	71	67	138	37	25	0.8	0.2	7.9	7.4	15.3	4.1	2.8	4
2025	Western Bulldogs	22	13	9	6	104	122	226	40	34	0.7	0.5	8.0	9.4	17.4	3.1	2.6	1
Career			174	94	81	1511	1661	3172	528	676	0.5	0.5	8.7	9.5	18.2	3.0	3.9	17

== Honours and achievements ==
Team

- AFL premiership player (Melbourne): 2021
- AFL minor premiership (Melbourne): 2021
- McClelland Trophy (Melbourne): 2021, 2023

Individual

- AFL Rising Star nominee: 2016 (Round 7)
