= Aaron vandenBerg =

Australian rules footballer (born 1992)

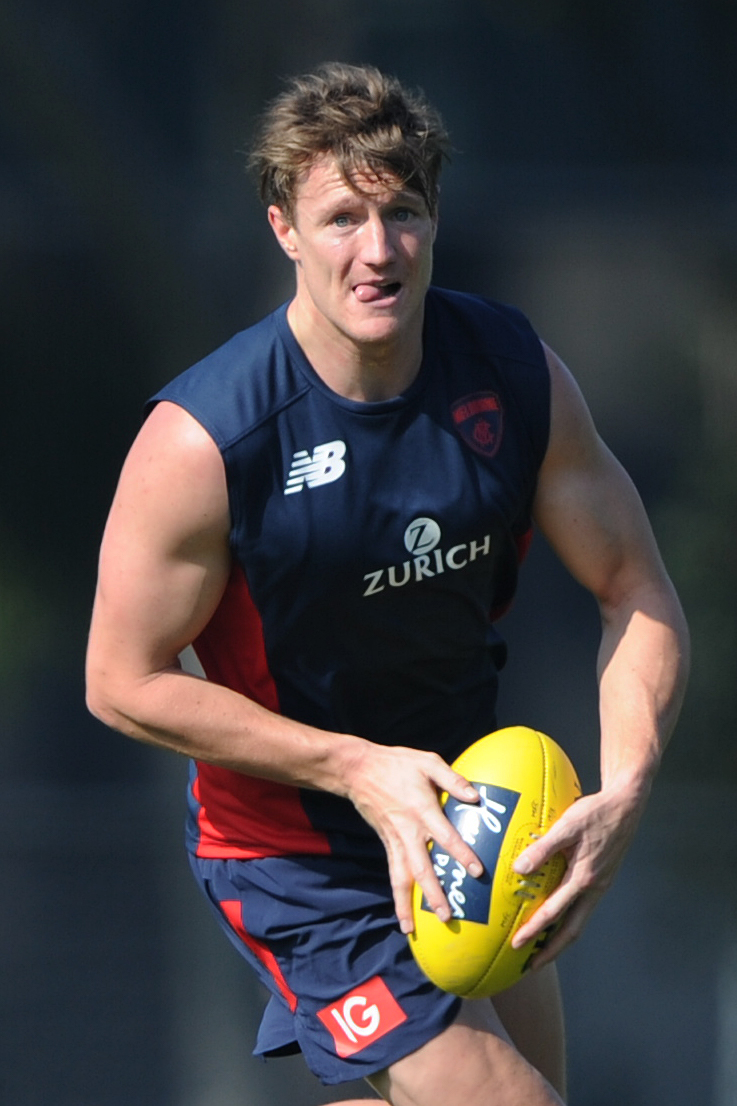
- vandenBerg training with Melbourne in April 2018

Personal information
- Full name: Aaron vandenBerg
- Nickname: Richie
- Born: 3 March 1992 (age 34); Perth, Western Australia
- Original team: Ainslie (NEAFL)
- Draft: No. 2, 2015 rookie draft
- Debut: Round 1, 2015, Melbourne vs. Gold Coast, at MCG
- Height: 188 cm (6 ft 2 in)
- Weight: 90 kg (198 lb)
- Position: Midfielder / forward

Playing career^{1}
Years	Club	Games (Goals)
2015–2021	Melbourne	47 (23)
- ^{1} Playing statistics correct to the end of round 15, 2021.

Aaron vandenBerg (born 3 March 1992) is a professional Australian rules footballer who played for the Melbourne Football Club in the Australian Football League (AFL). A midfielder, 1.88 metres (6 ft 2 in) tall and weighing 90 kilograms (200 lb), vandenBerg has the ability to contribute as both an inside and outside midfielder, whilst also pushing into the forward line. After missing out on the draft at eighteen years of age, vandenBerg played in the North East Australian Football League (NEAFL) with the Ainslie Football Club where he won two best and fairest awards and was twice named in the NEAFL team of the year. His performances in the NEAFL saw him recruited by the Melbourne Football Club with the second selection in the 2015 rookie draft and he made his AFL debut in the opening round of the 2015 season.

== Early life ==
Originally from Western Australia, vandenBerg moved to Tathra, New South Wales with his family at ten-years of age where he played junior football with the Tathra Football Club. He was first noticed as a potential AFL player in 2007 by then-Collingwood recruiter, Jason Taylor, however he was not drafted due to lacking "the drive to be an AFL footballer." He moved to Canberra in 2011 to join Ainslie in the North East Australian Football League (NEAFL), where he won the eastern conference premiership in his first year, and back-to-back Hibberson Cup Trophies as the club best and fairest player in 2013 and 2014. In addition, he was named in the NEAFL team of the year on the wing and as the ruck rover in 2013 and 2014 respectively. During 2014, he amassed fifty-six disposals in a match against Eastlake, which contributed to him being recognised as a high-disposal winner and put him back on the AFL radar. Then at Melbourne, Jason Taylor and the club decided to recruit him in December 2014. Whilst living in Canberra, he was completing a four-year apprenticeship at the Royal Australian Mint, but ended it after two and a half years to move to Melbourne.

== AFL career ==
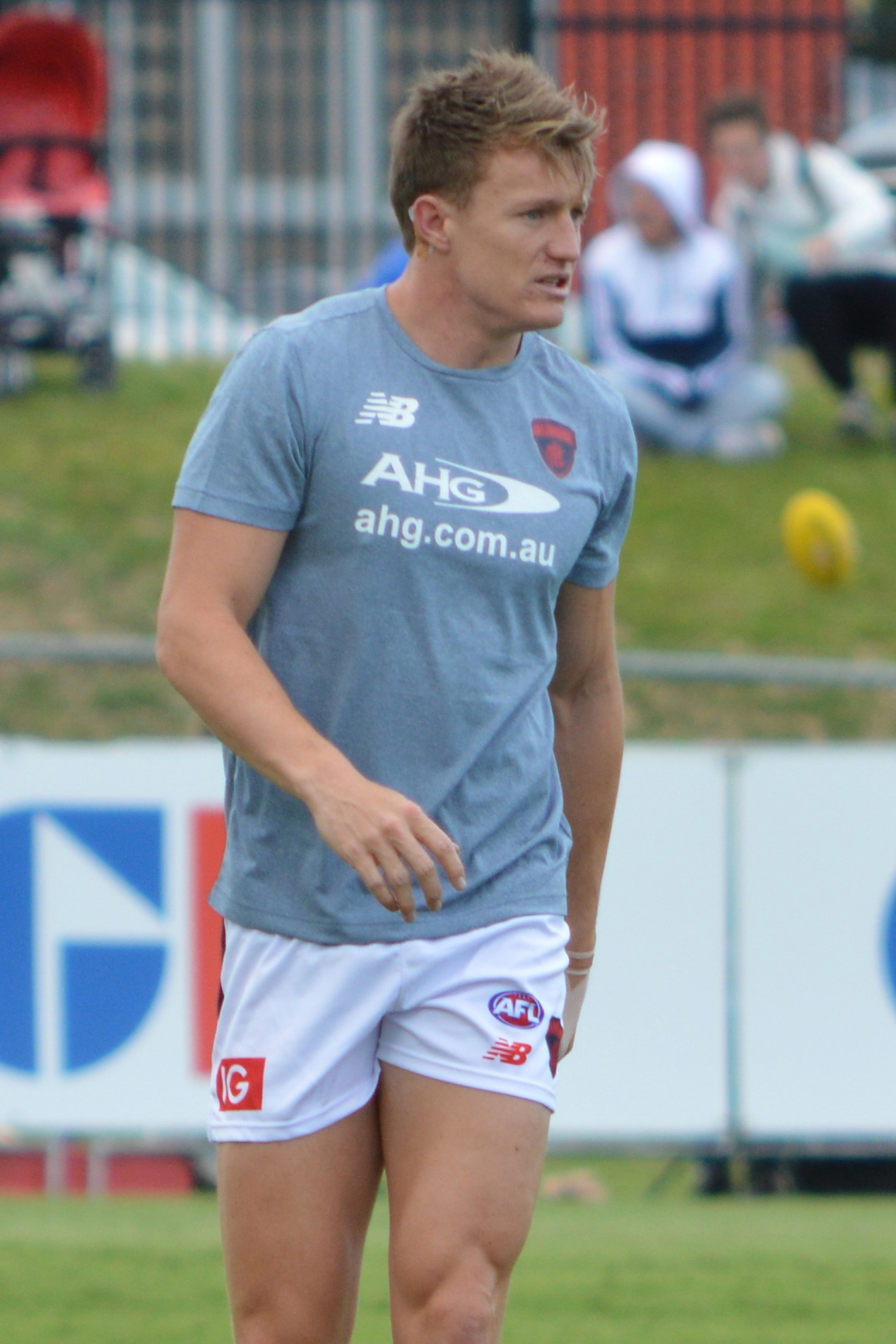
VandenBerg in February 2017

VandenBerg was drafted by the Melbourne Football Club with their first selection and second overall in the 2015 rookie draft. After a shoulder reconstruction at the end of 2014, Melbourne football operations manager, Josh Mahoney, stated vandenBerg was "exceeding expectations" and he made his debut in the 2015 opening round with a 26-point win against Gold Coast at the Melbourne Cricket Ground. He was named in the best players for Melbourne and recorded seventeen disposals, four marks and a goal. Lauded for his tenacity and ability to win the contested ball, he played the first ten matches of the year before suffering a hamstring strain in the annual Queen's Birthday clash against Collingwood. He returned to the side in round fifteen against Essendon, and he played the next four matches before injuring his ankle in August; he was then ruled out for the rest of the season after playing 14 matches in his debut season. After signing a contract extension until the end of the 2017 season, he was promoted from the rookie list to the senior list for the 2016 season onward.

Despite suffering from an ankle injury during the 2016 pre-season, vandenBerg played the start of the season in the senior side. He played in the first three matches of the season before re-aggravating his ankle injury, and he was forced to miss a month of football. He made his return to football in the Victorian Football League (VFL), playing for Melbourne's affiliate team, the Casey Scorpions. He returned to the senior side for the 18-point loss against Hawthorn at the Melbourne Cricket Ground in Round 11. He played the next five matches before missing the round eighteen match against West Coast at Domain Stadium due to a hip injury. He returned the next week for the two-point win against Gold Coast at the Melbourne Cricket Ground where he kicked a career-high three goals and was named in Melbourne's best. He played the remainder of the season to finish with fourteen games.

== Statistics ==
Legend
G	Goals	K	Kicks	D	Disposals	T	Tackles
B	Behinds	H	Handballs	M	Marks

Season	Team	No.	Games	Totals							Averages (per game)							Votes
Season	Team	No.	Games	G	B	K	H	D	M	T	G	B	K	H	D	M	T	Votes
2015	Melbourne	37	14	5	12	143	92	235	44	70	0.4	0.9	10.2	6.6	16.8	3.1	5.0	3
2016	Melbourne	37	14	12	9	80	125	205	43	50	0.9	0.8	5.7	8.9	14.6	3.1	3.6	0
2017	Melbourne	22	0	—	—	—	—	—	—	—	—	—	—	—	—	—	—	0
2018	Melbourne	22	7	5	6	61	50	111	30	22	0.7	0.9	8.7	7.1	15.9	4.3	3.1	0
2019	Melbourne	22	0	—	—	—	—	—	—	—	—	—	—	—	—	—	—	0
2020 (Note: The 2020 season was played with 17 home-and-away matches per team (down from 22) and 16-minute quarters with time on (down from 20-minute quarters with time on) due to the impact of the COVID-19 pandemic.)	Melbourne	22	12	1	1	73	69	142	34	31	0.1	0.1	6.1	5.8	11.8	2.8	2.6	0
2021 (Note: Statistics include two games in which vandenBerg was an unused medical substitute (rounds 16 and 22) and one game in which he was used as a medical substitute (round 21).)	Melbourne	22	4	0	0	18	9	27	3	8	0.0	0.0	4.5	2.3	6.8	0.8	2.0	0
Career			51	23	28	375	345	720	154	181	0.5	0.5	7.4	6.8	14.1	3.0	3.5	3
