= Billy Stretch =

Australian rules footballer (born 1996)

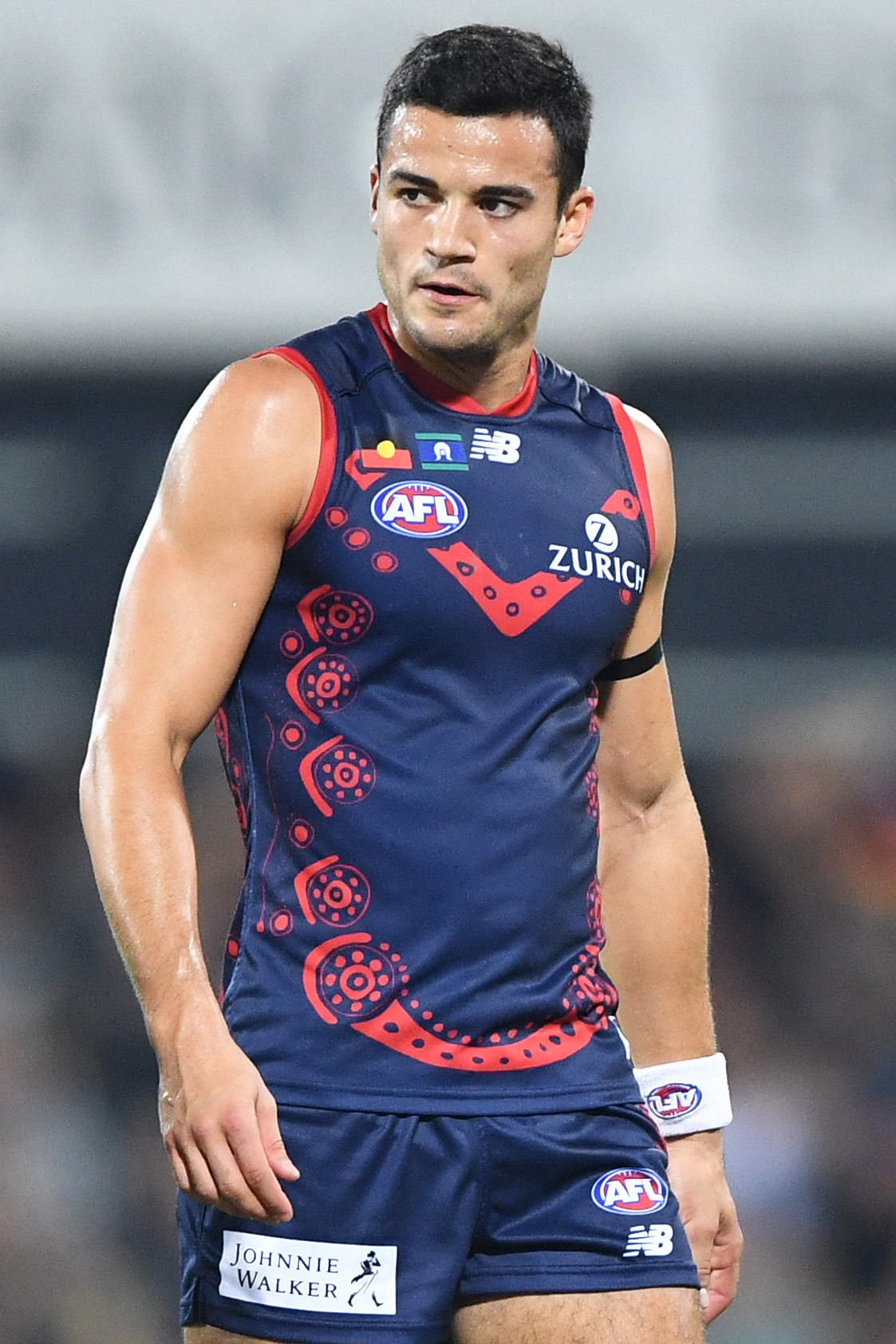
- Stretch with Melbourne in June 2019

Personal information
- Full name: Billy Stretch
- Born: 8 September 1996 (age 30); Melbourne, Victoria
- Original team: Glenelg (SANFL)
- Draft: No. 42 (F/S), 2014 national draft
- Debut: Round 6, 2015, Melbourne vs. Sydney, at MCG
- Height: 181 cm (5 ft 11 in)
- Weight: 80 kg (176 lb)
- Position: Midfielder

Club information
- Current club: Melbourne
- Number: 15

Playing career^{1}
Years	Club	Games (Goals)
2015-2019	Melbourne	47 (10)
- ^{1} Playing statistics correct to the end of 2019.

Billy Stretch (born 8 September 1996) is a former professional Australian rules footballer who played for the Melbourne Football Club in the Australian Football League (AFL). A midfielder, Stretch plays predominantly on the wing. Stretch was recognised as a talented footballer from a young age when he represented and captained South Australia at under 14 level, and continued to represent the state until under 18 level. His accolades as a junior include six best and fairest awards, a league best player award, national representation and All-Australian selection. His father, Steven Stretch, is a former player for the Melbourne Football Club and Keith 'Bluey' Truscott Medallist, which saw Billy recruited by the Melbourne Football Club under the father–son rule in the 2014 AFL draft and he made his AFL debut during the 2015 season.

== Early life ==
Stretch was born to Steven and Leona Stretch in Melbourne, Victoria before moving to Adelaide, South Australia at five years of age. His father played 164 games with the Melbourne Football Club and is a Keith 'Bluey' Truscott Medallist as the club's best and fairest player. He attended Immanuel College and was recognised as a potential AFL player by Melbourne at fourteen years of age after playing his junior football with the Woodville-West Torrens Football Club and Henley Football Club, where he won six best and fairest awards by the age of fourteen; in addition he was named the best under 14 player in the Metro West Football Association and captained South Australia in the South Australian Primary Schools Amateur Sports Association (SAPSASA).

He’s an AFL player with a big future and is a fantastic athlete like his father.

— Kevin Sheehan, AFL talent manager.

Stretch changed junior clubs to the Glenelg Football Club in 2009 and debuted for their South Australian National Football League (SANFL) reserves side in 2013. He was awarded state selection for South Australia at the 2012 under 16 championships and was named in the squad as a bottom-aged player in the 2013 AFL Under 18 Championships.

Stretch entered his final junior year with the prediction he would be recruited by Melbourne through the father–son rule in the 2014 AFL draft. The beginning of his final junior year saw him awarded a scholarship with the Australian Institute of Sport (AIS) as part of the AIS-AFL Academy in the 2013 level two intake and he travelled to Europe for two weeks in April 2014 with a thirty-one man squad. He received mid-year state honours and represented South Australia at the 2014 Under 18 Championships; playing mostly on the wing, he was named in the best players in four out of the five round-robin matches against Victoria Metro, Western Australia, and Victoria Country twice, and played in the winning final against Victoria Metro, and was again named in the best players. His efforts in the championships were rewarded with All-Australian selection on the wing. In addition, he became a regular in Glenelg's senior side with strong performances late in the season, including a best on ground performance against Adelaide in round 16, which earned him three votes in the Magarey Medal.

== AFL career ==
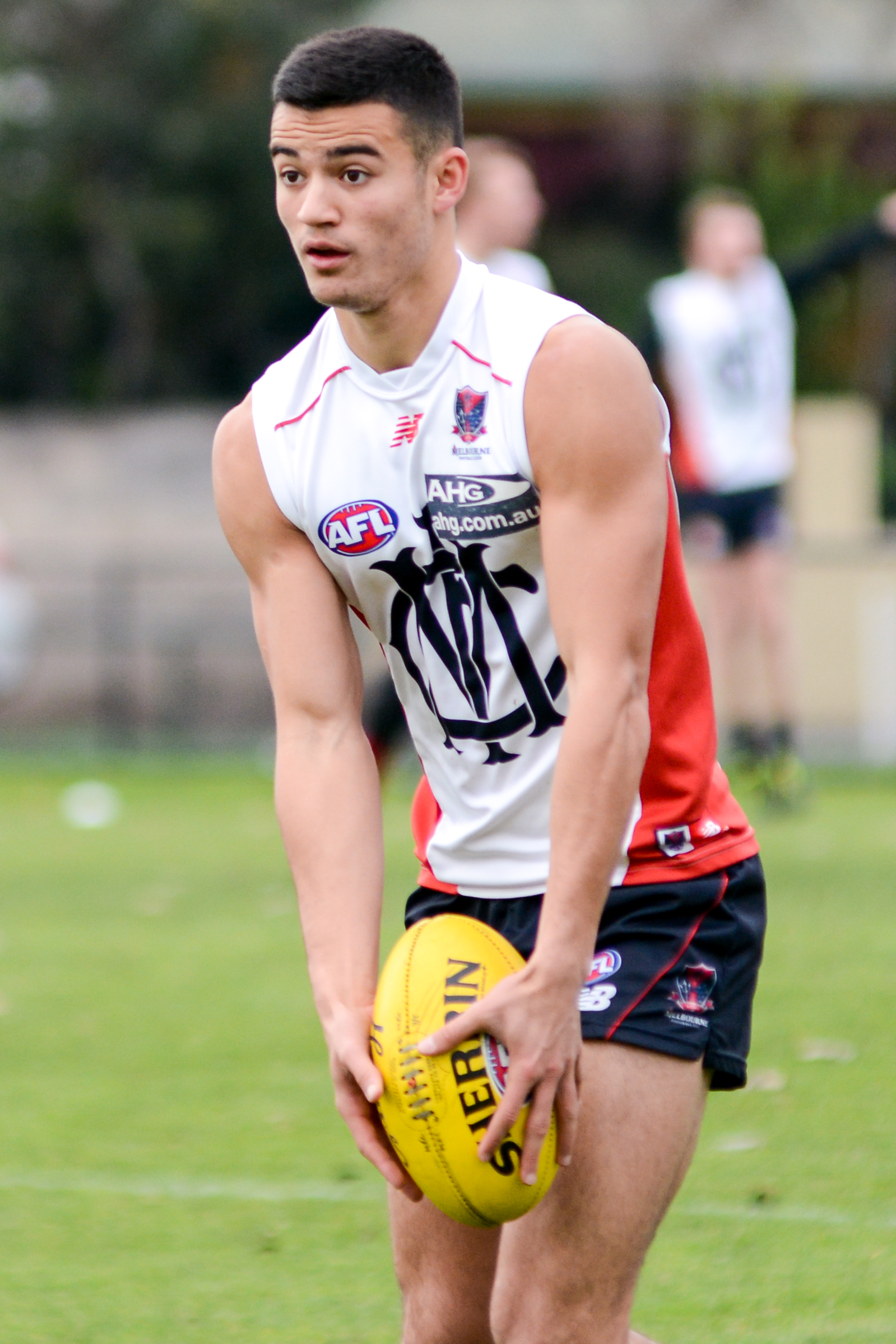
Stretch at training in July 2015

Stretch was nominated as a potential draftee by the Melbourne Football Club in September 2014 under the father–son rule. After Adelaide bid their second round pick on Stretch, Melbourne committed their third round pick and recruited him with their fourth selection and forty-second overall in the 2014 national draft. After spending the start of the 2015 season playing in the Victorian Football League (VFL) for Melbourne's affiliate team, the Casey Scorpions, he made his AFL debut against the Sydney Swans in round six at the Melbourne Cricket Ground, where he kicked his first goal with his first kick. He played eleven matches in his debut season and was praised by Melbourne football operations manager, Josh Mahoney, as someone who "adapted really quickly to the demands of being an AFL player."

After playing the first two matches in the 2016 NAB Challenge, Stretch missed selection for the opening round match against Greater Western Sydney and played his first AFL match of the year against North Melbourne at Blundstone Arena in round three. With seconds left in the match, he had a chance to kick the winning goal, however his snap for goal missed and registered as a behind. He was omitted the next week for the match against Richmond at the Melbourne Cricket Ground, and returned for the seventy-three point win against Gold Coast at Metricon Stadium in round seven. His next two weeks saw him break his career-high disposal counts with twenty-five and thirty-one disposals against the Western Bulldogs and Gold Coast respectively. The match against Gold Coast saw him earn praise from then-Melbourne coach, Paul Roos, who said his game was "fantastic", and Herald Sun chief of football writer, Mark Robinson, who commended his ball use and decision making. He missed one match for the remainder of the season, the thirty-six point loss against St Kilda at Etihad Stadium in round seventeen to finish with sixteen matches for the season and a sixteenth-place finish in the best and fairest count.

Coming off the 2017 pre-season, in which he had "taken great strides, adding bulk to his frame and improving his ability to win contested footy" according to AFL Media journalist, Ben Guthrie, Stretch played the opening five matches of the AFL season before he was dropped for the round six match against Essendon at Etihad Stadium. He spent nine weeks in the VFL before returning in the three point win against West Coast at Domain Stadium in round fourteen. He played three consecutive matches before being omitted for the round seventeen match against Adelaide at TIO Stadium. Despite having strong form in the VFL, he struggled to play regularly in the senior team, and played only one match for the remainder of the season, the thirteen point win against Brisbane at the Melbourne Cricket Ground in round twenty-two. He finished the season with nine matches and signed a contract extension, tying him to the club until the end of the 2019 season.

Stretch managed a further 11 games across the 2018 and 2019 seasons before being delisted at the end of 2019.

== Statistics ==
Statistics are correct to the end of the 2019 season

Legend
G	Goals	K	Kicks	D	Disposals	T	Tackles
B	Behinds	H	Handballs	M	Marks

Season	Team	No.	Games	Totals							Averages (per game)						
Season	Team	No.	Games	G	B	K	H	D	M	T	G	B	K	H	D	M	T
2015	Melbourne	15	11	2	2	63	51	114	26	39	0.2	0.2	5.7	4.7	10.4	2.4	3.6
2016	Melbourne	15	16	3	4	122	170	292	49	59	0.2	0.3	7.6	10.6	18.2	3.1	3.7
2017	Melbourne	15	9	3	4	57	107	164	30	30	0.3	0.4	6.3	11.9	18.2	3.3	3.3
2018	Melbourne	15	2	0	2	22	18	40	7	6	0.0	1.0	11.0	9.0	20.0	3.5	3.0
2019	Melbourne	15	9	2	1	91	65	156	36	27	0.2	0.1	10.1	7.2	17.3	4.0	3.0
Career			47	10	13	355	411	766	148	161	0.2	0.3	7.6	8.7	16.3	3.1	3.4
