= Ben Newton (Australian footballer) =

Australian rules footballer (born 1992)

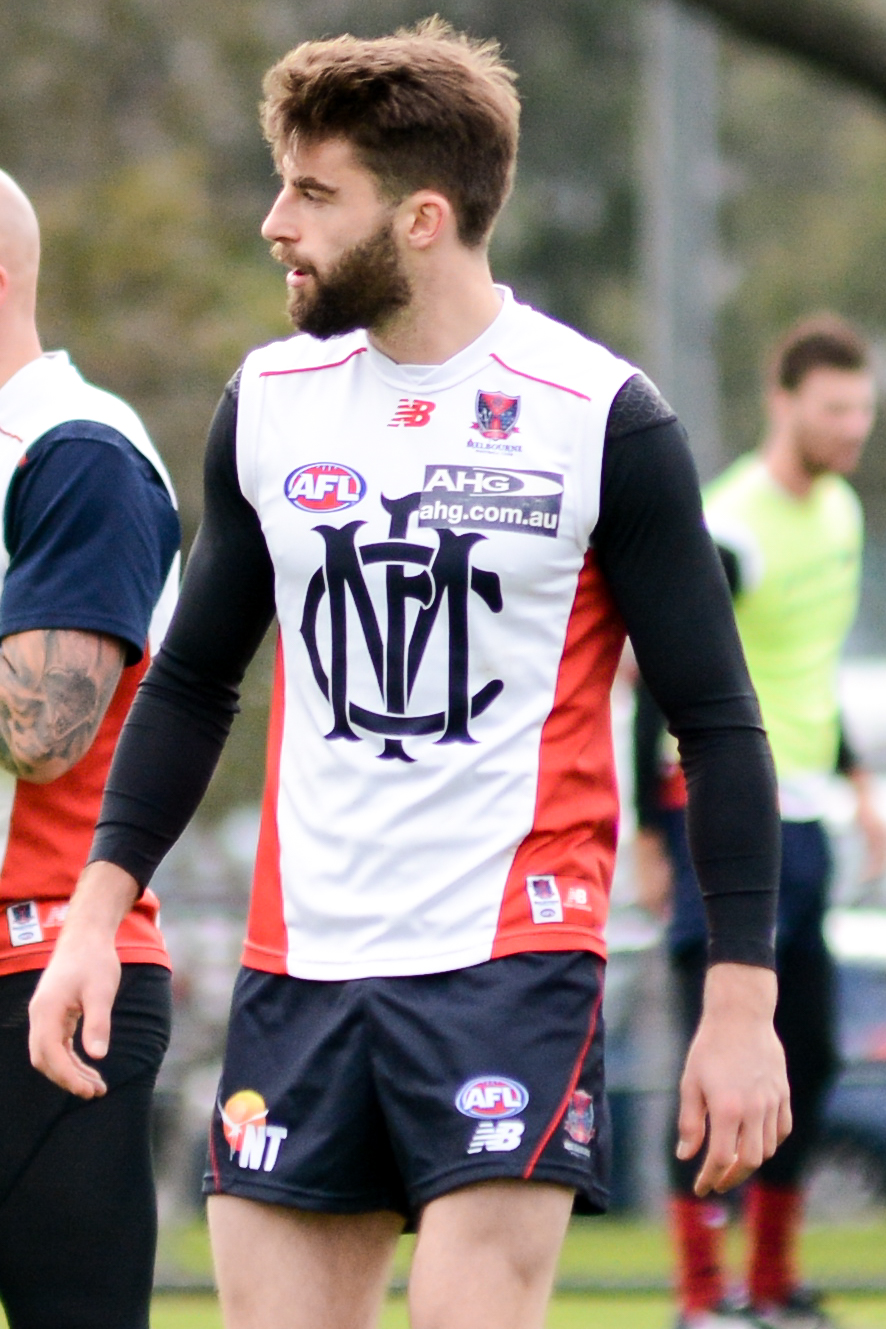
- Newton at training during July 2015

Personal information
- Full name: Benjamin Newton
- Born: 8 August 1992 (age 34)
- Original team: South Fremantle
- Draft: No. 35, 2010 National Draft
- Debut: Round 7, 2014, Port Adelaide vs. Greater Western Sydney, at StarTrack Oval
- Height: 183 cm (6 ft 0 in)
- Weight: 85 kg (187 lb)
- Position: Midfielder

Playing career^{1}
Years	Club	Games (Goals)
2011–2014	Port Adelaide	4 (0)
2015–2016	Melbourne	13 (12)
Total		17 (12)
- ^{1} Playing statistics correct to the end of 2016.

Ben Newton (born 8 August 1992) is a former professional Australian rules footballer who played for the Port Adelaide Football Club and Melbourne Football Club in the Australian Football League (AFL).

Newton was drafted by Port Adelaide with pick 35 in the 2010 National Draft. He made his AFL debut against Greater Western Sydney in round 7 of the 2014 AFL season.

At the end of the 2014 season, Newton left Port Adelaide citing that he wanted more opportunities at AFL level. He was subsequently recruited by Melbourne as a delisted free agent. At the conclusion of the 2016 season, he was delisted by Melbourne.

== Statistics ==
Legend
G	Goals	K	Kicks	D	Disposals	T	Tackles
B	Behinds	H	Handballs	M	Marks

Season	Team	No.	Games	Totals							Averages (per game)						
Season	Team	No.	Games	G	B	K	H	D	M	T	G	B	K	H	D	M	T
2011	Port Adelaide	38	0	—	—	—	—	—	—	—	—	—	—	—	—	—	—
2012	Port Adelaide	38	0	—	—	—	—	—	—	—	—	—	—	—	—	—	—
2013	Port Adelaide	38	0	—	—	—	—	—	—	—	—	—	—	—	—	—	—
2014	Port Adelaide	38	4	0	2	18	22	40	9	9	0.0	0.5	4.5	5.5	10.0	2.3	2.3
2015	Melbourne	19	11	11	6	88	75	163	28	36	1.0	0.5	8.0	6.8	14.8	2.6	3.3
2016	Melbourne	19	2	1	0	14	20	34	6	5	0.5	0.0	7.0	10.0	17.0	3.0	2.5
Career			17	12	8	120	117	237	43	50	0.7	0.5	7.1	6.9	13.9	2.5	2.9
