= Sam Frost =

Australian rules footballer (born 1993)

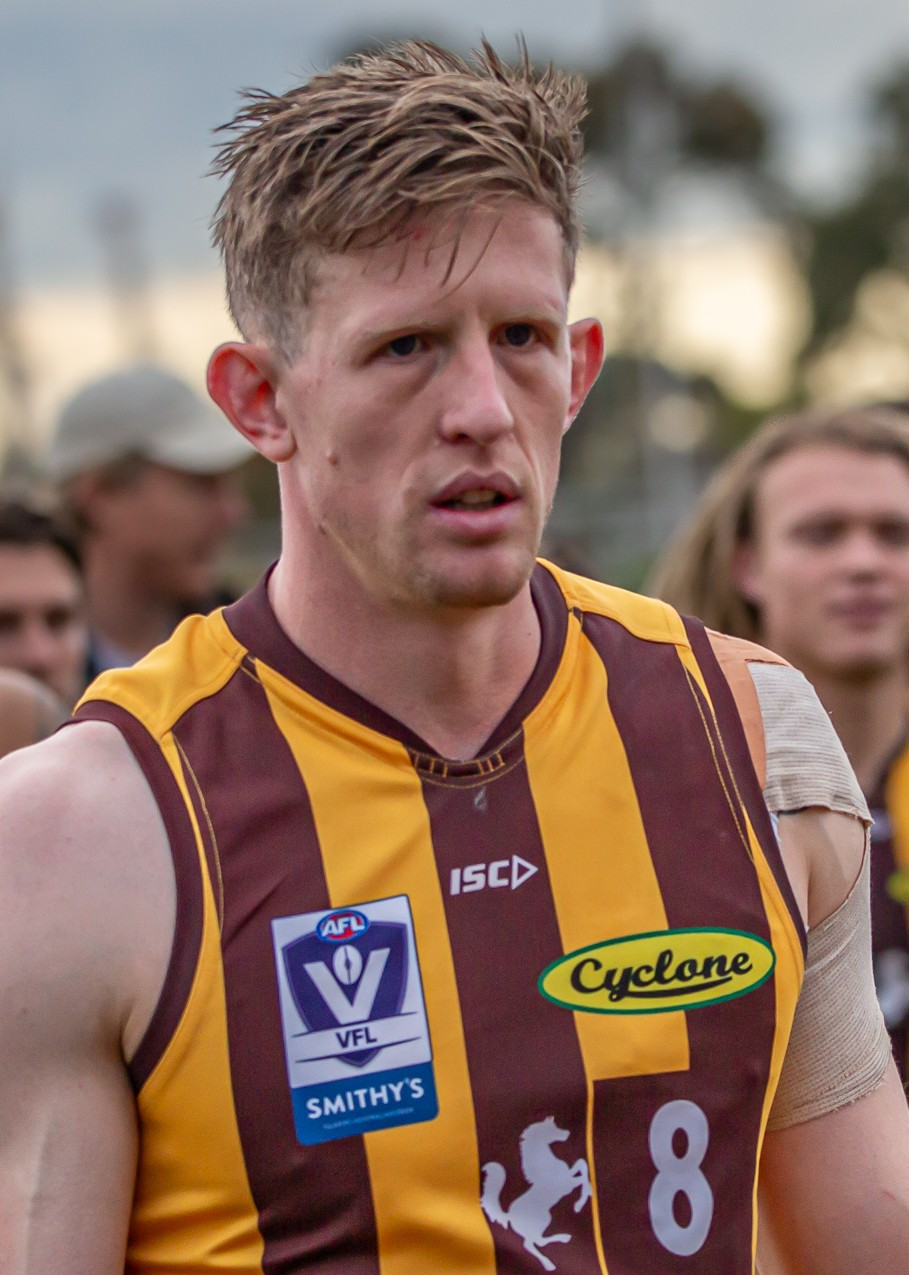
- Frost in 2025

Personal information
- Full name: Samuel Frost
- Born: 28 August 1993 (age 33)
- Original team: Sandringham Dragons (TAC Cup)
- Draft: No. 1, 2012 rookie draft
- Debut: Round 17, 2012, Greater Western Sydney vs. Fremantle, at Patersons Stadium
- Height: 194 cm (6 ft 4 in)
- Weight: 94 kg (207 lb)
- Position: Key defender

Playing career
Years	Club	Games (Goals)
2012–2014	Greater Western Sydney	21 (2)
2015–2019	Melbourne	70 (6)
2020–2025	Hawthorn	94 (1)
Total		185 (9)

Samuel Frost (born 28 August 1993) is a professional Australian rules footballer who most recently played for the Hawthorn Football Club in the Australian Football League (AFL).

A utility, Frost has the ability to play as either a forward or defender, and is capable of also playing in the ruck. He entered top-level football early when he played as a bottom-aged player for the Sandringham Dragons in the TAC Cup. His final year as a junior saw him play in both the winning grand final for Sandringham and the winning final for Vic Metro in the 2011 AFL Under 18 Championships. He was recruited by the Greater Western Sydney Giants with the first selection in the 2012 rookie draft and made his debut during the 2012 season. After three seasons with Greater Western Sydney and 21 matches in total, he was traded to the Melbourne Football Club during the 2014 trade period. On 11 October 2019 he was traded to Hawthorn.

== Early life ==
Frost was born to Wendy and David Frost, and after having a junior career of playing both volleyball and basketball, he focused on Australian rules football when he joined the Sandringham Dragons in the TAC Cup as a bottom-aged player in 2010 where he played as a ruckman. He completed year twelve at Wesley College in 2011 and returned to the Sandringham Dragons in the same year, in which he moved into the backline and played in the eight-point grand final win against the Oakleigh Chargers. He received mid-year state honours when he represented Vic Metro in the 2011 AFL Under 18 Championships and played in the winning final against Vic Country. Heading into the 2011 AFL draft he was predicted to be drafted inside the top thirty.

== AFL career ==
=== 2012–2014: Early career at Greater Western Sydney ===
After missing selection in the 2011 national draft, Frost was ultimately recruited by the Greater Western Sydney Giants with the first overall selection in the 2012 rookie draft. He spent the first half of the 2012 season playing for the UWS Giants in the North East Australian Football League (NEAFL) before he made his AFL debut in the ninety-five-point loss against Fremantle at Patersons Stadium in round seventeen where he recorded ten disposals, four tackles, three marks and a goal. He played the next two matches before requiring hip surgery, which ended his season with three AFL matches in total. After spending the season on the rookie list, he was promoted to the senior list at the end of the season through the 2012 national draft.

Frost played his first AFL match of the 2013 season in the forty-one point loss against Melbourne at the Melbourne Cricket Ground in round four, he was omitted the next week for the match against Gold Coast at Manuka Oval before returning to the senior side the next week for his last AFL match of the year in the thirty-nine-point loss against Essendon at Etihad Stadium. He played the majority of the year in the NEAFL where he played 22 matches for the season.

After a strong pre-season in 2014, and injuries to fellow backmen, Phil Davis and Tim Mohr, saw Frost given the opportunity to play in the seniors for an extended period of time. He played in the first eight matches of the year before being omitted for the first match after the mid-season bye in the round ten match against Richmond at Spotless Stadium. He returned the next week for the seven-point loss against Hawthorn at the Melbourne Cricket Ground, and played the next five matches before he was dropped for the round seventeen match against Fremantle at Patersons Stadium. He played in two of the remaining six matches to finish with sixteen matches for the year. After twenty-one matches in total for Greater Western Sydney, he requested a trade in September to return to his home state of Victoria, and was officially traded to the Melbourne Football Club in October.

=== 2015–2019: Move to Melbourne ===
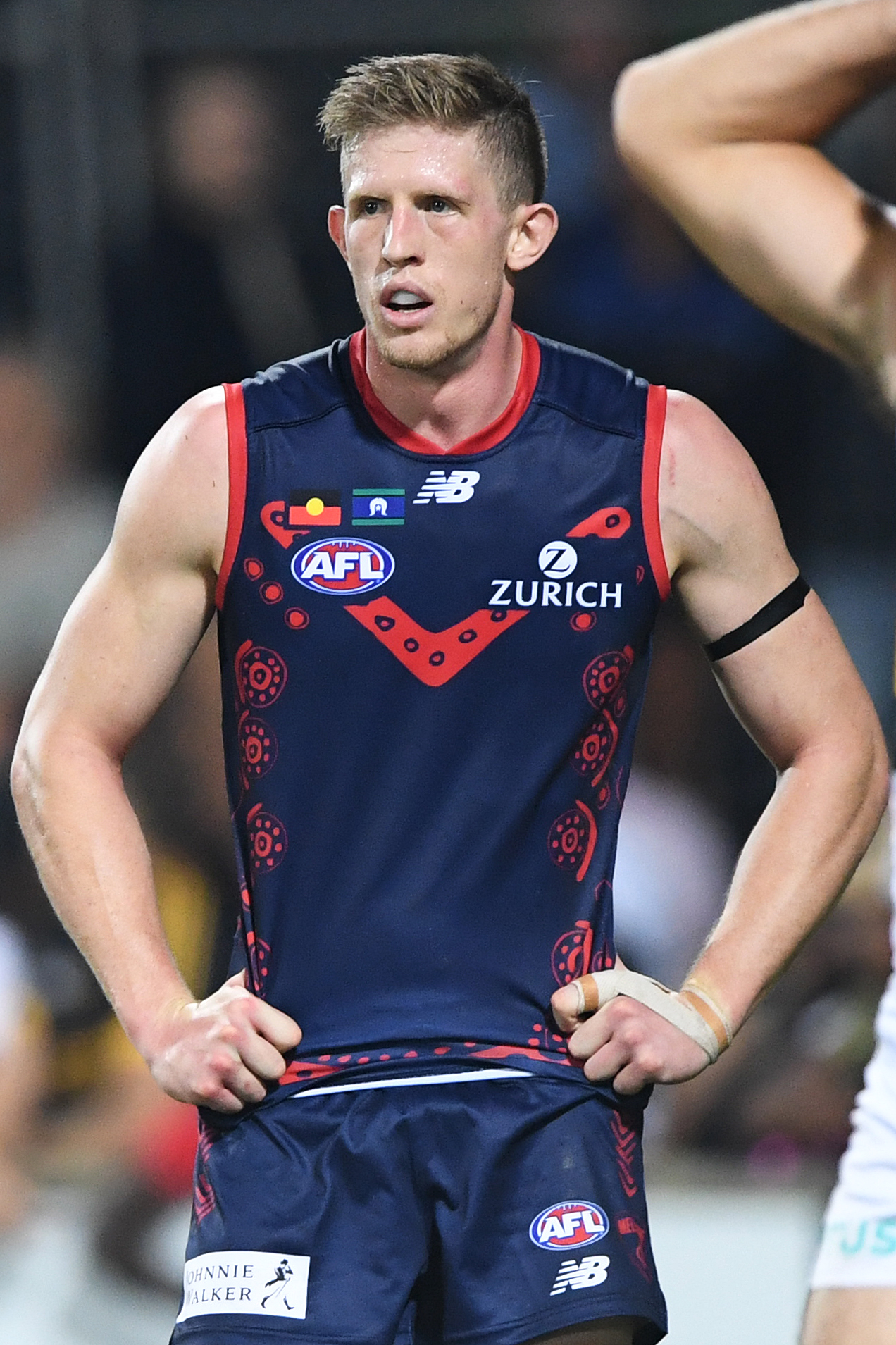
Frost playing for Melbourne in June 2019

Frost played his first match for Melbourne in the twenty-six-point win against Gold Coast at the Melbourne Cricket Ground in round one. He played the first three matches of the year before breaking his toe during the twenty-five-point loss against Adelaide at the Adelaide Oval in round three. He was initially ruled out for "four to six weeks," but he did not return to any football during 2015.

The start of the 2016 season saw Frost move into the forward line and he played in the opening round match against Greater Western Sydney at the Melbourne Cricket Ground in a two-point win. He was omitted the next week for the match against Essendon, before returning for the five-point loss against North Melbourne at Blundstone Arena the next week; he played the next four matches before he was dropped for the round seven match against Gold Coast at Metricon Stadium. He spent the next three weeks in the Victorian Football League (VFL) playing for Melbourne's affiliate team, the Casey Scorpions and returned for the eighteen point loss against Hawthorn at the Melbourne Cricket Ground in round eleven. His return to the senior side saw him return to playing as a defender; the move to the backline proved successful for Frost as he played every match for the remainder of the season apart from the round seventeen match against St Kilda at Etihad Stadium where he was a late withdrawal due to illness to finish the season with sixteen matches in total.

Heading into the 2017 season, Frost sustained a foot injury which forced him to miss the opening round clash against St Kilda and instead start the season in the VFL with Casey. He played his first AFL match of the year in the two-point loss to Fremantle at the Melbourne Cricket Ground in round four. In his third match back, he was praised for his performance in the three-point loss to Hawthorn at the Melbourne Cricket Ground in round seven, in which he recorded twenty disposals, seven rebound 50s and seven marks, by senior coach, Simon Goodwin, with Melbourne reporter, Matt Burgan, stating it was one of Frost's "best AFL performances" and he was named in AFL Media's team of the week. He played sixteen consecutive matches, including his fiftieth AFL match in the three-point win against West Coast at Domain Stadium in round fourteen, before he was omitted for the round twenty-one match against St Kilda at the Melbourne Cricket Ground. He did not return to the AFL side for the remainder of the year and speculation was starting to arise by the media that he would be involved in a trade with Adelaide so the club could try and secure Jake Lever. He dispelled the speculation in September when he signed a two-year contract, tying him to the club until the end of the 2019 season.

=== 2020–2025: Hawthorn ===
Frost was traded to Hawthorn at the conclusion of the 2019 AFL season. Frost was assigned guernsey number 8 for the 2020 season.

Frost made an immediate impact with his aerial dominance in defence He missed just one game in his first year at the club, the following year he played every game. In 2022 he accepted a contract extension for two years. Frost has also proven his versatility, with stints up forward and in the ruck. Sam Frost's experience as a defender has helped guide and develop a young backline. His 2022 season finished early with a knee injury. In 2023 he had to battle some minor injury niggles across the year, Frost's season was cut short again. The experienced defender managed to trigger a contract extension during 2024 but he sustained a stress fracture in his foot during the Elimination final and that ended his season.

== Statistics ==
Legend
G	Goals	K	Kicks	D	Disposals	T	Tackles
B	Behinds	H	Handballs	M	Marks

Season	Team	No.	Games	Totals							Averages (per game)							Votes
Season	Team	No.	Games	G	B	K	H	D	M	T	G	B	K	H	D	M	T	Votes
2012	Greater Western Sydney	48	3	1	0	23	14	37	14	5	0.3	0.0	7.7	4.7	12.3	4.7	1.7	0
2013	Greater Western Sydney	48	2	0	0	7	12	19	4	2	0.0	0.0	3.5	6.0	9.5	2.0	1.0	0
2014	Greater Western Sydney	48	16	1	1	99	94	193	59	26	0.1	0.1	6.2	5.9	12.1	3.7	1.6	0
2015	Melbourne	17	3	0	3	12	13	25	3	6	0.0	1.0	4.0	4.3	8.3	1.0	2.0	0
2016	Melbourne	17	16	5	6	113	93	206	57	35	0.3	0.4	7.1	5.8	12.9	3.6	2.2	0
2017	Melbourne	17	16	1	0	127	89	216	61	40	0.1	0.0	7.9	5.6	13.5	3.8	2.5	0
2018	Melbourne	17	13	0	0	88	61	149	46	30	0.0	0.0	6.8	4.7	11.5	3.5	2.3	0
2019	Melbourne	17	22	0	2	188	108	296	95	35	0.0	0.1	8.5	4.9	13.5	4.3	1.6	0
2020 (Note: The 2020 season was played with 17 home-and-away matches per team (down from 22) and 16-minute quarters with time on (down from 20-minute quarters with time on) due to the impact of the COVID-19 pandemic.)	Hawthorn	8	16	0	2	96	68	164	55	20	0.0	0.1	6.0	4.3	10.3	3.4	1.3	0
2021	Hawthorn	8	22	0	0	194	139	333	112	44	0.0	0.0	8.8	6.3	15.1	5.1	2.0	0
2022	Hawthorn	8	12	1	1	91	68	159	55	24	0.1	0.1	7.6	5.7	13.3	4.6	2.0	0
2023	Hawthorn	8	18	0	1	116	114	230	75	36	0.0	0.1	6.4	6.3	12.8	4.2	2.0	2
2024	Hawthorn	8	24	0	0	124	96	220	80	38	0.0	0.0	5.2	4.0	9.2	3.3	1.6	0
2025	Hawthorn	8	2	0	0	6	2	8	0	2	0.0	0.0	3.0	1.0	4.0	0.0	1.0	0
Career			185	9	16	1284	971	2255	716	343	0.0	0.1	6.9	5.2	12.2	3.9	1.9	2

== Honours and achievements ==
Team

- McClelland Trophy (Hawthorn): 2024

== Personal life ==
His father, David Frost, played thirty-four matches for the Glenelg Football Club and seventy-two matches for the Sturt Football Club in the South Australian National Football League (SANFL) during the 1980s and his older brother, Jack Frost played fifty-four matches for the Collingwood Football Club and two matches for the Brisbane Lions.

He has German heritage through his grandfather who was originally from Germany.
