= 2014 AFL Under 18 Championships =

Youth Australian rules football competition

- Teams: 8

Division 1
- Teams: 4
- Champions: South Australia
- Larke Medal: Christian Petracca

Division 2
- Teams: 4
- Champions: NSW/ACT
- Hunter Harrison Medal: Isaac Heeney

The 2014 NAB AFL Under 18 Championships was the 19th edition of the AFL Under 18 Championships. Eight teams competed in the championships: Vic Metro, Vic Country, South Australia and Western Australia in Division 1, and New South Wales/Australian Capital Territory (NSW/ACT), Northern Territory, Queensland and Tasmania in Division 2. The competition was played over five rounds across two divisions. South Australia and New South Wales/Australian Capital Territory (NSW/ACT) were the Division 1 and Division 2 champions, respectively. The Larke Medal (for the best player in Division 1) was awarded to Vic Metro's Christian Petracca, and the Hunter Harrison Medal (for the best player in Division 2) was won by NSW/ACT midfielder Isaac Heeney.

== Results ==
=== Division 1 ===
	Round 1
Sunday, 18 May (11:00am)	Vic Metro 11.8 (74)	def. by	Vic Country 14.5 (89)	Trevor Barker Oval	Report
Saturday, 24 May (12:00pm)	South Australia 14.8 (92)	def.	Western Australia 8.13 (61)	AAMI Stadium	Report

	Round 2
Saturday, 31 May (11:00am)	Western Australia 2.11 (23)	def. by	Vic Metro 15.20 (110)	Medibank Stadium	Report
Sunday, 1 June (11:00am)	South Australia 9.21 (75)	def.	Vic Country 8.5 (53)	AAMI Stadium	Report

	Round 3
Saturday, 7 June (11:00am)	Western Australia 9.12 (66)	def. by	South Australia 10.11 (71)	Medibank Stadium	Report
Sunday, 8 June (11:00am)	Vic Country 12.9 (81)	def.	Vic Metro 4.13 (37)	Simonds Stadium	Report

	Round 4
Saturday, 14 June (10:30am)	South Australia 10.12 (72)	def. by	Vic Metro 13.8 (86)	AAMI Stadium	Report
Sunday, 15 June (11:00am)	Western Australia 5.5 (35)	def. by	Vic Country 14.13 (97)	Fremantle Oval	Report

	Round 5
Friday, 27 June (12:35pm)	Vic Metro 16.10 (106)	def.	Western Australia 7.6 (48)	Simonds Stadium	Report
Friday, 27 June (2:35pm)	Vic Country 2.8 (20)	def. by	South Australia 12.11 (83)	Simonds Stadium	Report

	Round 6
Wednesday, 2 July (5:00pm)	Vic Country 10.5 (65)	def. by	Western Australia 9.13 (67)	Etihad Stadium	Report
Thursday, 3 July (1:05pm)	Vic Metro 10.10 (70)	def. by	South Australia 11.13 (79)	Simonds Stadium	Report

Division 1 Ladder

TEAM	WON	LOST	FOR	AGAINST	PERCENTAGE
South Australia	5	1	472	356	132.6%
Vic Metro	3	3	483	392	123.2%
Vic Country	3	3	405	371	109.2%
Western Australia	1	5	300	541	55.5%

=== Division 2 ===
	Round 1
Saturday, 21 June (10:30am)	Queensland 11.10 (76)	def.	Tasmania 7.5 (47)	Blacktown ISP Oval	Report
Saturday, 21 June (12:50pm)	NSW/ACT 20.14 (134)	def.	Northern Territory 8.5 (53)	Blacktown ISP Oval	Report

	Round 2
Saturday, 28 June (12:00pm)	Queensland 10.12 (72)	def.	Northern Territory 6.6 (42)	Windy Hill	Report
Saturday, 28 June (2:15pm)	NSW/ACT 8.9 (57)	def.	Tasmania 7.6 (48)	Windy Hill	Report

	Round 3
Wednesday, 2 July (3:00pm)	NSW/ACT 8.10 (58)	def.	Queensland 6.9 (45)	Etihad Stadium	Report
Thursday, 3 July (11:00am)	Tasmania 15.5 (95)	def.	Northern Territory 8.7 (55)	Simonds Stadium	Report

Division 2 Ladder

TEAM	WON	LOST	FOR	AGAINST	PERCENTAGE
NSW/ACT	3	0	249	146	170.5%
Queensland	2	1	193	147	131.3%
Tasmania	1	2	190	188	101.1%
Northern Territory	0	3	150	301	49.8%

== All-Australian team ==
The 2014 Under 18 All-Australian team was named on 4 July 2014:

2014 Under 18 All-Australian team
B:	Harrison Wigg (SA)	Ed Vickers-Willis (VM)	Josh McGuinness (Tas)
HB:	Darcy Tucker (VC)	Caleb Marchbank (VC)	Angus Brayshaw (VM)
C:	Paul Ahern (VM)	Christian Petracca (VM)	Billy Stretch (SA)
HF:	Callum Mills (NSW/ACT)	Darcy Moore (VM)	Rhys Mathieson (VC)
F:	Jayden Laverde (VM)	Patrick McCartin (VC)	Caleb Daniel (SA)
Foll:	Peter Wright (VM)	Isaac Heeney (NSW/ACT)	Jake Johansen (SA)
Int:	Jack Steele (NSW/ACT)	Darcy Parish (VC)	Ben Keays (Qld)
Int:	Connor Blakely (WA)		
Coach:	Jason Saddington (NSW/ACT), assistant Brenton Phillips (SA)		
