= 2014 Melbourne Football Club season =

Sporting season

Melbourne Football Club
2014 season
- President: Glen Bartlett^{(1st season)}
- Coach: Paul Roos^{(1st season)}
- Captains: Jack Grimes^{(3rd season)} Nathan Jones^{(1st season)}
- Home grounds: MCG^{(100,024 capacity)}
- Pre-season: 1 win, 2 losses
- AFL season: 17th
- Finals series: DNQ
- Best and fairest: Nathan Jones
- Leading goalkicker: Chris Dawes^{(20 goals)}
- Highest home attendance: 68,124^{(round 12 vs. Collingwood)}
- Lowest home attendance: 5,655^{(round 11 vs. Port Adelaide)}
- Average home attendance: 25,638
- Club membership: 35,911^{(▲2,734 / ▲8.26%)}

The 2014 Melbourne Football Club season was the club's 115th year in the VFL/AFL since it began in 1897.

On the back of three seasons stemming back to 2011, Melbourne underwent changes to its football department in 2013. The most significant of these changes included the appointment of 2005 premiership coach Paul Roos for two seasons (with an option of a third season). It also saw the temporary appointment of former Essendon CEO, Peter Jackson, as Melbourne's new CEO for two seasons and the appointment of former Bernie Naylor Medalist Glen Bartlett as president.

Due to Melbourne's on-field performances in recent seasons, Melbourne received a very financially challenging fixture. For the second consecutive season, Melbourne did not receive a Friday night game and were forced to play Port Adelaide, West Coast, Greater Western Sydney, North Melbourne and Western Bulldogs twice (none of whom are traditionally large crowd drawers in Melbourne's home games).

Melbourne sold two of its home games into the Northern Territory due to a sponsorship deal made with Tourism NT. One was at TIO Traeger Park in Alice Springs in round 11 against Port Adelaide. This will be the first ever AFL game held at this stadium for premiership points as well as the first in Central Australia. The other game was at TIO Stadium in Darwin against Fremantle in round 16. In addition Melbourne hosted the Brisbane Lions at Etihad Stadium in round 19 as Collingwood hosted Port Adelaide at the MCG later that day instead.

Despite the financially challenging fixture, Melbourne hosted a handful of blockbuster games, which included Paul Roos coaching against his old side Sydney in round 5 for the first time. Melbourne continued to play its annual Queen's Birthday clash against Collingwood in round 12 (despite a record low crowd of 50,853 in 2013). Melbourne also hosted Geelong for the first time since Round 11, 2009 in round 17.

== 2014 list changes ==
=== 2013 free agency ===
Player	Date	Free agent type	Former club	New club	Compensation	Ref
Colin Sylvia	4 October 2013	Unrestricted	Melbourne	Fremantle	2nd round	
Daniel Cross	1 November 2013	Delisted	Western Bulldogs	Melbourne	None	
Aidan Riley	11 November 2013	Delisted	Adelaide	Melbourne	None	

=== 2013 trades ===
Date	Trade gained	Traded from	Trade lost	Ref
Viv Michie	16 October 2013	Fremantle	Pick 54	
Dom Tyson; Pick 9 Pick 53	18 October 2013	Greater Western Sydney	Pick 2 Pick 20; Pick 72	
Bernie Vince	18 October 2013	Adelaide	Pick 23	

=== Retirements and delistings ===
Player	New club	League	Reason	Ref
David Rodan	West Preston Lakeside	Northern Football League	Retired	
Aaron Davey	Richmond reserves	VFL	Retired	
Joel Macdonald	unknown	unknown	Retired	
James Sellar	South Fremantle	WAFL	Delisted	
Josh Tynan	Frankston	VFL	Delisted	
Troy Davis	Casey	VFL	Delisted	
Tom Gillies	St Mary's	GFL	Delisted	
Tom Couch	Collingwood reserves	VFL	Delisted	
James Magner	Port Melbourne	VFL	Delisted	
Nathan Stark	Glenelg	SANFL	Delisted	
Rory Taggert	Sturt	SANFL	Delisted	
Neville Jetta	Melbourne	AFL	Delisted but re-drafted as a rookie	

=== National draft ===
Round	Overall pick	Player	State	Position	Team from	League from
1	9	Christian Salem	(Victoria (state))	Midfield	Sandringham Dragons	TAC Cup
3	40	Jay Kennedy Harris	(Victoria (state))	Forward	Oakleigh Chargers	TAC Cup
4	57	Jayden Hunt	(Victoria (state))	Midfield/Defender	Brighton Grammar	APS
6	82 (RP)	Mitch Clisby	(South Australia)	Midfield/Defender	Melbourne	AFL

=== Rookie draft ===
Round	Overall pick	Player	State	Position	Team from	League from
1	2	James Harmes	(Victoria (state))	Midfield	Dandenong Stingrays	TAC Cup
2	19	Max King	(Victoria (state))	Forward/Ruckman	Murray Bushrangers	TAC Cup
3	35	Alexis Georgiou	(South Australia)	Forward/Ruckman	Norwood	SANFL
4	50	Neville Jetta	(Western Australia)	Utility	Melbourne	AFL

== 2014 squad ==
Melbourne Football Club
Senior list		Rookie List	Coaching staff
1 Jesse Hogan; 2 Nathan Jones (c); 3 Christian Salem; 4 Jack Watts; 5 Jimmy Toumpas; 6 Chris Dawes; 7 Jack Viney; 8 James Frawley; 9 Jack Trengove; 10 Shannon Byrnes; 11 Mitch Clark; 12 Dom Tyson; 13 Jordie McKenzie; 14 Lynden Dunn; 15 Mitch Clisby; 16 Dean Kent; 17 Sam Blease; 18 Daniel Cross; 19 James Strauss; 20 Colin Garland	21 Cameron Pedersen; 22 Viv Michie; 23 Bernie Vince; 24 Jay Kennedy Harris; 25 Tom McDonald; 26 Daniel Nicholson; 27 Aidan Riley; 29 Jayden Hunt; 31 Jack Grimes (c); 32 Michael Evans; 33 Dominic Barry; 35 Luke Tapscott; 37 Max Gawn; 38 Jeremy Howe; 40 Mark Jamar; 42 Jake Spencer; 44 Rohan Bail; 45 Matt Jones; 46 Dean Terlich; 48 Jack Fitzpatrick	39 Neville Jetta; 41 Alexis Georgiou; 43 James Harmes; 47 Max King; 50 Maia Westrupp	Head coach: Paul Roos; Assistant coaches: George Stone (midfield and strategy coach); Ben Mathews (midfield coach); Jade Rawlings (backline coach); Daniel McPherson (forward coach); Brett Allison (head of development); Brad Miller (development coach); Legend: (c) Captain(s); (vc) Vice-captain(s); Long-term injury list; Upgraded rookie(s); (vet) Veterans list; Updated: 20 May 2014; Source(s): Team List, Staff Members

== 2014 season ==
=== Pre-season ===
==== NAB Challenge ====
===== Week 1 =====
Round 1
Friday, 14 February (7:10 pm)	Richmond	def. by	Melbourne	Etihad Stadium (crowd: 12,024)
1.2.2 (23); 1.6.7 (52); 1.7.10 (61); 1.10.15 (84)	Q1; Q2; Q3; Final	0.1.7 (13); 1.5.8 (47); 1.8.9 (66); 1.13.11 (98)	Television broadcast: Fox Footy
Griffiths	Super Goals	Pedersen
Vickery 3, Miles 2, Newman 2, Deledio 2, Batchelor	Goals	Howe 4, Kennedy Harris 3, Bail 2, Trengove, Blease, King, Spencer
Martin, Morris, Miles, Deledio, Foley, Vlastuin	Best	Vince, N. Jones, Trengove, Terlich, Kennedy Harris, Frawley, Bail
Newman (knee)	Injuries	Nil
nil	Reports	Nil
With Paul Roos coaching his first pre-season game for Melbourne, The Demons appeared to show signs of their horrendous 2013 form by conceding a rapid goal to Chris Newman from a midfield clearance in the first minute of play.; Melbourne however began to show signs of observable improvement in the midfield by dominating much of the possession and finding other running free players on the wings and through the middle of the ground.; Though Melbourne scored 7 behinds before they were able to score their first goal, they kicked three goals in a row to take the lead away from Richmond.; The rest of the match appeared to be an arm-wrestle between the two teams as Richmond were able to move the ball forward by long direct passes in contrast to Melbourne's collective short passing.; With Melbourne leading narrowly 86–84 late in the final quarter, a shunted sideways kick from David Astbury just outside Melbourne's 50 saw Jay Kennedy Harris gain possession of the ball, run all the way up to the goal square and put the margin out of Richmond's reach.; Melbourne's 14-point win was highlighted by their domination in the possession count winning it 446-263, a complete reversal to the trend that happened in 2013.

===== Week 2 =====
Round 2
Friday, 28 February (5:40 pm)	Melbourne	def. by	Geelong	TIO Traeger Park (crowd: 5,378)
0.3.0 (18); 2.5.0 (48); 2.7.1 (61); 3.9.3 (84)	Q1; Q2; Q3; Final	0.6.5 (41); 0.8.6 (54); 0.14.9 (93); 0.14.13 (97)	Television broadcast: Fox Footy
Michie, Vince, N. Jones	Super Goals
Howe 2, Hogan, Toumpas, Bail, Trengove, Michie, Cross, N. Jones	Goals	Brown 3, Duncan 2, Bartel 2, Taylor 2, Horlin-Smith, Caddy, Hawkins, Varcoe, Walker
Vince, Tyson, N. Jones, Cross, Dunn, Michie	Best	Duncan, Caddy, Johnson, Bartel, Horlin-Smith, Rivers
Toumpas (head)	Injuries	Selwood (hamstring)
Nil	Reports	Smedts (striking)
Melbourne started the match similar to their game-plan from 2 weeks ago by maintaining possession of the ball. However Geelong's midfield pressure was too good for Melbourne to gain territory with and hence they were able to continuously rebound the ball back inside their forward 50 to take a 23 point lead at half-time.; Melbourne fought back in the second quarter by finding running loose players and gathering momentum. Trailing by 17 points midway through the second quarter they were able to kick 2 super-goals in a row through Viv Michie and Bernie Vince to lead for the first time in the game.; Geelong however managed to re-control Melbourne's running momentum and kick the next 5 goals in a row to drag the match out of Melbourne's reach.; Melbourne managed to fight back in the final quarter keeping Geelong goalless and scoring 1 supergoal and 2 goals, but it happened too late in the game when Geelong were in cool down mode.; Despite Geelong dominating the inside 50 count 62-31, Melbourne did manage to beat them in the disposal count 444-350

==== Practice matches ====
===== Week 3 =====
Week 3
Saturday, 8 March (1:00 pm)	Melbourne	def. by	Hawthorn	Casey Fields (crowd: 9,723)
2.2 (14); 2.3 (15); 3.5 (23); 4.8 (32)	Q1; Q2; Q3; Final	3.5 (23); 9.8 (62); 16.13 (109); 21.16 (142)	Television broadcast: none
Howe 2, Byrnes, Spencer	Goals	Roughead 6, Smith 2, Gibson 2, Langford 2, Breust, Shiels, Puopolo, McEvoy, Simpkin, Suckling, Hodge, Hill, Gunston
Dunn, Vince, Cross, Howe, Spencer	Best	Roughead, Mitchell, Birchall, McEvoy, Gunston, Suckling, Wanganeen
Jones (eye), Grimes (cut head), Frawley (ribs)	Injuries	Statton (hamstring soreness), O'Brien (sore)
Nil	Reports	Nil
Melbourne appeared to be in the game with the 2013 premiers only trailing by 9 points at quarter time. However a string of 10 consecutive goals from Hawthorn destroyed any chance of Melbourne displaying another promising pre-season match.; Hawthorn would only continue to dominate Melbourne with contested possessions for the rest of the game as they extended the margin beyond 3 figures in front of a full attendance at Casey Fields.

=== Home and away season ===
==== Round 1 ====
Round 1
Saturday, 22 March (7:40 pm)	St Kilda	def.	Melbourne	Etihad Stadium (crowd: 31,607)
1.3 (9); 4.5 (29); 8.6 (54); 10.8 (68)	Q1; Q2; Q3; Final	2.2 (14); 2.10 (22); 4.11 (35); 6.15 (51)	Television broadcast: Seven Network
Riewoldt 3, Stanley 2, Saunders, Templeton, Armitage, Gwilt, Geary	Goals	Byrnes 2, Toumpas, Terlich, Tyson, M. Jones
Riewoldt, Jones, Ray, Hickey, Dunstan, Curren, Saunders	Best	N. Jones, Vince, Watts, Tyson, Dunn
Webster (groin)	Injuries	McDonald (corked thigh), Fitzpatrick (concussion)
Nil	Reports	Nil
Despite lacking a forward line with Mitch Clark, Chris Dawes or Jesse Hogan, the new Paul Roos-led Melbourne entered the game as favourites against St Kilda (who were depleted of their key midfielders) for the first time in 10 years.; Melbourne got off to a good start scoring the first 2 goals of the game off St Kilda clangers. However once St Kilda gained composure in their backline, Melbourne struggled to deliver the ball effectively into their forward 50.; From there on, a lackluster game full of clangers from both sides was played. Melbourne struggled to deliver the ball inside their 50 without the presence of a key forward as St Kilda were able to score from turnovers via their key forwards in Nick Riewoldt and Rhys Stanley.; With St Kilda leading by 33 points midway through the third term, Melbourne staged a mini comeback. However it was to no avail as Melbourne were unable to capitalize on their opportunities inside their forward 50.; Despite losing by 17 points, Melbourne easily won the disposal count 408-348 and the inside 50 count 47-38.; Debut(s): Alexis Georgiou, Jay Kennedy Harris; Debut(s) for MFC: Daniel Cross (Western Bulldogs) , Viv Michie (Fremantle) , Dom Tyson (Greater Western Sydney) , Bernie Vince (Adelaide); Milestone(s): Jimmy Toumpas (1st AFL Goal) , Dean Terlich (1st AFL Goal); Brownlow Votes: Nick Riewoldt (St Kilda) 3 votes, Clinton Jones (St Kilda) 2 votes, Nathan Jones (Melbourne) 1 vote Record: 0 Wins, 1 Loss, 0 Draws (75.00%); Ladder Position: 12th Substitutes: Jay Kennedy Harris ▲ Tom McDonald ▼

==== Round 2 ====
Round 2
Sunday, 30 March (3:20 pm)	Melbourne	def. by	West Coast	MCG (crowd: 22,226)
0.1 (1); 1.3 (9); 2.4 (16); 4.6 (30)	Q1; Q2; Q3; Final	6.5 (41); 10.7 (67); 14.10 (94); 18.15 (123)	Television broadcast: Seven Network
Byrnes 2, Kennedy Harris, Toumpas	Goals	Kennedy 4, Darling 3, Masten 2, LeCras 2, Naitanui, Mackenzie, Cripps, Sinclair
Cross, Tyson, N. Jones, Byrnes	Best	Shuey, Gaff, Masten, Kennedy, Priddis, Naitanui, Darling
Michie (cut eye)	Injuries	Hurn (knee)
Nil	Reports	Nil
Still lacking their three first choice forwards, Melbourne again struggled to score and were torn apart by the Eagles' embarrassment of riches. West Coast restricted the Demons to a point in the first quarter, and after it took them almost six minutes to get the first goal of the game the Eagles then piled on another five to open up a match winning lead.; Melbourne matched their opponents on most of the key disposal stats, but turnover goals and an inability to find targets inside 50 cost them dearly. They managed just 30 points for the day, one of their lowest scores of the AFL era - equal to their second lowest total in 2013.; Milestone(s): Jay Kennedy Harris (1st AFL Goal); Brownlow Votes: Luke Shuey (West Coast) 3 votes, Andrew Gaff (West Coast) 2 votes, Chris Masten (West Coast) 1 vote Record: 0 Wins, 2 Losses, 0 Draws (42.41%); Ladder Position: 18th Substitutes: Jay Kennedy Harris ▲ Jack Fitzpatrick ▼

==== Round 3 ====
Round 3
Sunday, 06 April (1:10 pm)	Greater Western Sydney	def.	Melbourne	Spotless Stadium (crowd: 7,016)
1.2 (8); 2.7 (19); 5.12 (42); 10.19 (79)	Q1; Q2; Q3; Final	0.2 (2); 1.5 (11); 5.5 (35); 7.5 (47)	Television broadcast: Fox Footy
Patton 2, Cameron 2, Kelly 2, Treloar, Mumford, Smith, Coniglio	Goals	Dunn, Watts, Kent, Frawley, M. Jones
Treloar, Mumford, Ward, Bugg, Shaw, Kelly	Best	N. Jones, Dunn, Vince, Cross, M. Jones
Nil	Injuries	Nil
Nil	Reports	Nil
Melbourne's 12th straight loss, dating back to midway through the previous season, saw them back in last place. Coach Paul Roos had shuffled his side, sending Jeremy Howe to the backline and both Lynden Dunn and James Frawley forward. Dunn had form as an attacker, but it was the first time Frawley, the former All Australian full-back, had played a whole game up front.; Rain made scoring difficult. There were heavy falls before the match and more during the game. It contributed to a first quarter with just 10 points scored, one goal to the Giants and none to Melbourne. It was the first Melbourne game to have less than 10 points scored in total in the first quarter since Round 12, 1961.; The error-strewn match remained tight throughout the day, with both times committing terrible skill errors. Melbourne pulled in front during the third quarter, and again in the opening seconds of the last but the Giants' endeavour won out and they dominated the tackle count despite also comfortably winning the disposals.; After James Frawley kicked his first goal as a forward early in the last, the Giants took over and booted five of the last six goals to win comfortably.; Brownlow Votes: Shane Mumford (Greater Western Sydney) 3 votes, Adam Treloar (Greater Western Sydney) 2 votes, Callan Ward (Greater Western Sydney) 1 vote Record: 0 Wins, 3 Losses, 0 Draws (47.41%); Ladder Position: 18th Substitutes: Jay Kennedy Harris ▲ Shannon Byrnes ▼

==== Round 4 ====
Round 4
Saturday, 12 April (1:45 pm)	Carlton	def. by	Melbourne	MCG (crowd: 37,323)
3.4 (22); 5.9 (39); 6.11 (47); 7.16 (58)	Q1; Q2; Q3; Final	3.2 (20); 6.7 (43); 10.8 (68); 12.9 (81)	Television broadcast: Seven Network
Ellard 2, Yarran 2, Murphy, Casboult, Henderson	Goals	Frawley 2, Dawes 2, Bail 2, Watts 2, N. Jones, Dunn, Kennedy Harris, Pedersen
Simpson, Curnow, Yarran	Best	N. Jones, Frawley, Viney, McDonald, Dawes, Grimes, Spencer
Menzel (left thigh), Thomas (left shoulder), Jamison (shoulder)	Injuries	Terlich (hamstring)
Robert Warnock (striking)	Reports	Nil
After 12 consecutive losses, Melbourne broke their equal seventh longest club losing streak to keep the Blues winless for 2014.; Carlton started well with two goals in the first three minutes, the first coming from the centre bounce when Melbourne gave away a free kick and a 50 metre penalty, but managed just four more for the rest of the game.; In a game containing all the skill errors that you'd expect between two teams who entered the game 0-3, Melbourne lost most of the statistical categories but successfully chased and tackled enough to rattle the Blues. It didn't hurt that Carlton were terribly inaccurate in front of goal, with nine straight behinds from midway through the first quarter until late in the second and another five in a row early in the last quarter.; The Demons welcomed Chris Dawes back for his first game of the year and he kicked two goals from outside 50, linking up well with makeshift forward James Frawley who kicked two goals of his own and took 14 marks.; Two late first quarter goals narrowed the margin to two points before the Demons jumped out to a 17 point lead in the second quarter. Nathan Jones took time out from winning a comfortable victory over Marc Murphy to kick a goal on the run from the boundary line, and both Frawley and Lynden Dunn added goals. Two goals in three minutes to David Ellard allowed the Blues to drag the margin back to four points at the long break.; With Carlton already having made their substitution due to injury in the first quarter, and carrying two other players who were hurt, it took 12 minutes for the first goal to be scored in the second half but Melbourne got two in a row to open up a 16 point lead. Two more late in the quarter, the second to Rohan Bail after a controversial relayed free kick after ruckman Robert Warnock was reported for striking Jake Spencer restored a 21 point lead going into the last quarter.; Carlton did all the attacking in the first 10 minutes of the last quarter but managed just five behinds before Jack Watts marked in front of goal and kicked his second to give the Demons some breathing space. After a Michael Evans snap which looked to be rolling through took a right break and was rushed through for a point Carlton goalled through Chris Yarran to keep the game interesting before Cameron Pedersen sealed victory with a speculative snap shot from the boundary line.; It was Melbourne's first win against Carlton since Round 22, 2007; Brownlow Votes: James Frawley (Melbourne) 3 votes, Nathan Jones (Melbourne) 2 votes, Kade Simpson (Carlton) 1 vote Record: 1 Win, 3 Losses, 0 Draws (63.72%); Ladder Position: 16th Substitutes: Michael Evans ▲ Dean Terlich ▼

==== Round 5 ====
Round 5
Sunday, 20 April (3:20 pm)	Melbourne	def. by	Gold Coast	MCG (crowd: 17,243)
3.2 (20); 4.4 (28); 6.10 (46); 11.12 (78)	Q1; Q2; Q3; Final	2.7 (19); 6.12(48); 8.17 (65); 11.20 (86)	Television broadcast: Seven Network
Frawley 2, Dawes 2, Pedersen, Kennedy Harris, Terlich, N. Jones, Howe, Viney, Evans	Goals	Matera 2, Lynch 2, Ablett 2, Swallow 2, Hall, Day, Broughton
N. Jones, Viney, Dawes, Frawley, Cross	Best	Ablett, Broughton, Rischitelli, Swallow, Matera
Nil	Injuries	Nil
Nil	Reports	Nil
After an early Gold Coast surge, Melbourne scored their first major with a controversial score review from a James Frawley-bomb outside 50. They then managed to score another 2 quick goals via Chris Dawes and Cameron Pedersen.; With Melbourne 10 points in front, Gold Coast uplifted their tacking pressure. However they were very wasteful in-front of goal and only managed to reduce the deficit one point at quarter time.; For much of the second quarter, Gold Coast continued to out tackle Melbourne and continuously force turn-overs before Melbourne could move the ball past the midfield. Despite the fact that they continued to be wasteful early in the second quarter, they were eventually able to capitalise on their continual inside 50s and open up a 26 point lead heading into half time.; The third quarter finally saw Melbourne uplift their running intensity and ball movement through the middle of the ground. They were able to generate scoring opportunities in-front of goal. However they couldn't capitalise on them and only won the quarter by a point.; The final quarter saw Nathan Jones reel the deficit down to 13 points midway through it. However a controversial high tackle free kick and goal that was paid to Gary Ablett and goal on the run from David Swallow made the deficit too difficult for Melbourne to come back from.; Melbourne could only manage to cut the margin down to 7 points in junk time as Gold Coast won their third consecutive match against Melbourne.; Brownlow Votes: Gary Ablett, Jr. (Gold Coast) 3 votes, Nathan Jones (Melbourne) 2 votes, Michael Rischitelli (Gold Coast) 1 vote Record: 1 Win, 4 Losses, 0 Draws (69.32%); Ladder Position: 17th Substitutes: Michael Evans ▲ Dom Tyson ▼

==== Round 6 ====
Round 6
Saturday, 26 April (7:40 pm)	Melbourne	def. by	Sydney	MCG (crowd: 24,855)
1.2 (8); 2.3 (15); 4.4 (28); 5.8 (38)	Q1; Q2; Q3; Final	4.5 (29); 4.8 (32); 7.12 (54); 9.15 (69)	Television broadcast: Seven Network
Byrnes, Dawes, Tyson, M. Jones, Salem	Goals	K. Jack 2, Parker, Franklin, Hannebery, Cunningham, Kennedy, McGlynn, Derickx
M. Jones, N. Jones, Vince, Dunn, Terlich, McDonald	Best	Hannebery, Kennedy, Parker, K. Jack, Shaw, Rampe
Nil	Injuries	Franklin (knee), Jetta (calf)
Nil	Reports	Nil
For the first time, Paul Roos coached against his old premiership coached side.; Sydney began the game scoring 2 early goals, before Shannon Byrnes kicked the first major of the night for Melbourne from a free kick.; Melbourne and Sydney both had patches of dominating play throughout the first quarter with many missed opportunities. However late in the first quarter Sydney were able to score consecutive goals and run away with a 21 point lead.; In a sloppy second quarter filled with hard tackling but many errors from both sides, Melbourne were able to keep Sydney to a goalless quarter, the first time against any team since round 21, 2012. Melbourne too were inefficient with their forward 50 entries however, only managing a single goal through Chris Dawes.; The second half saw both sides launch take more fluent football from both sides. However Sydney's class allowed them to capitalise on more scoring opportunities than Melbourne. They outscored the Demons 4 goals to 2 up to the midway point of the final quarter.; A goal from debutant Christian Salem regained some hope of a comeback, before Sydney retaliated with one more goal of their own. From many missed opportunities in the final quarter Sydney unconvincingly hopped away to a 31 point win.; Debut(s): Christian Salem; Milestone(s): Rohan Bail (50th AFL Game), Christian Salem (1st AFL Goal); Brownlow Votes: Dan Hannebery (Sydney) 3 votes, Kieren Jack (Sydney) 2 votes, Nathan Jones (Melbourne) 1 vote Record: 1 Win, 5 Losses, 0 Draws (67.30%); Ladder Position: 17th Substitutes: Christian Salem ▲ Neville Jetta ▼

==== Round 7 ====
Round 7
Saturday, 03 May (4:10 pm)	Adelaide	def. by	Melbourne	Adelaide Oval (crowd: 44,216)
1.1 (7); 2.4 (16); 5.10 (40); 9.13 (67)	Q1; Q2; Q3; Final	4.0 (24); 7.2 (44); 8.4 (52); 11.4 (70)	Television broadcast: Fox Footy
Jenkins 2, Dangerfield 2, Podsiadly 2, Thompson, Crouch, Petrenko	Goals	Dawes 3, Bail, Kennedy Harris, Salem, Watts, Viney, N. Jones, Jamar, Tyson
Dangerfield, Jacobs, Smith, Laird, Thompson, Sloane	Best	Dawes, Tyson, Viney, Vince, Kennedy Harris, Howe
Lynch (concussion), Jaensch	Injuries	Georgiou (concussion)
Nil	Reports	Nil
With Patrick Dangerfield booting an early goal within the first minute of the game, Melbourne appeared to be in for yet another interstate thrashing by Adelaide.; Melbourne were however able to halt the home crowd from buoying Adelaide with their high-possession game as seen from the start of the season.; With Melbourne halting off Adelaide's momentum completely, they managed to launch their own corridor offense late in the first quarter to kick the next 4 goals through Rohan Bail, Jay Kennedy Harris, Christian Salem and Jack Watts.; Melbourne continued to shock the local crowd in the second quarter. Through Chris Dawes' marking strength as well as an overhead handball to Jack Viney, Melbourne kicked an extra 3 goals in a row to lead by 36 points midway through the second quarter.; Adelaide gradually wrestled back control of the game by dominating the clearances and inside 50's to boot the next 4 goals of the game. However a free-kick and goal to Chris Dawes just before 3 quarter time, managed to temporarily halt off Adelaide's momentum.; Despite kicking in the breeze, Adelaide continued their offense through the corridor to get within a kick from the lead. However a high tackle free kick and goal from the boundary line from Nathan Jones; contested overhead mark and goal in the goal-square from Mark Jamar as well as a hard ball get and shot from Dom Tyson took the game out of Adelaide's reach.; With Melbourne holding on by 3 points late in the game, a Rohan Bail clearance and bomb into Melbourne's empty 50 ensured that Melbourne would win their first game in South Australia since Round 2, 2001.; Brownlow Votes: Patrick Dangerfield (Adelaide) 3 votes, Chris Dawes (Melbourne) 2 votes, Jeremy Howe (Melbourne) 1 vote Record: 2 Wins, 5 Losses, 0 Draws (71.82%); Ladder Position: 17th Substitutes: Christian Salem ▲ Alex Georgiou ▼

==== Round 8 ====
Round 8
Saturday, 10 May (7:40 pm)	Melbourne	def. by	Western Bulldogs	MCG (crowd: 36,326)
2.2 (14); 5.5 (35); 10.6 (66); 12.11 (83)	Q1; Q2; Q3; Final	3.2 (20); 5.7 (37); 9.7 (61); 15.9 (99)	Television broadcast: Seven Network
Kennedy Harris 2, Frawley 2, Tyson 2, Dawes, Cross, Pedersen, Jamar, Vince, Salem	Goals	Crameri 4, Williams 3, Liberatore 2, Tutt 2, Cooney, Griffen, Minson, Giansiracusa
Cross, Tyson, Vince, N. Jones, McDonald, Viney	Best	Liberatore, Dahlhaus, Cooney, Crameri, Johannisen, Williams
Frawley (right thigh), Terlich (concussion)	Injuries	Dickson (left shoulder), Williams (right calf)
Nil	Reports	Nil
Melbourne entered the game wearing a one off female silhouetted pink-vee jumper in support of the Breast Cancer Network Australia. This was their second time promoting the organization since Round 7, 2010.; The Western Bulldogs got off to an early lead by kicking the first 2 goals before James Frawley and Chris Dawes kick-started Melbourne's night to close the lead to 8 points at quarter time.; With Stewart Crameri kicking the Bulldogs off to a match high 14 point lead; a running mark and set-shot from ex-Bulldog Daniel Cross, 50+ metre bomb from Cameron Pedersen and 50 metre boundary line set-shot from Jay Kennedy Harris got Melbourne within 2 points of the lead at half time.; Melbourne took the lead for the first time of the game when Jay-Kennedy Harris kicked a roving goal from 40 metres before the Bulldogs took the lead back immediately.; Despite the Bulldogs being able to reply immediately to Melbourne's goals; majors from Dom Tyson, Mark Jamar, Bernie Vince and Chris Dawes gave Melbourne a slim 5 point lead heading into the final quarter.; Whilst the Bulldogs kicked 2 quick consecutive goals at the start of the final term, a running shot at goal by Christian Salem and a long drop punt by Dom Tyson leveled the scores up.; With Bulldogs 6 points in-front very late in the game, a running shot that was missed from Matt Jones could've altered the lead for the 11th time in the half.; Melbourne tired out in the final minutes of the game and conceded the last 2 goals of the game in a hard fought contest.; Brownlow Votes: Tom Liberatore (Western Bulldogs) 3 votes, Stewart Crameri (Western Bulldogs) 2 votes, Dom Tyson (Melbourne) 1 vote Record: 2 Wins, 6 Losses, 0 Draws (73.65%); Ladder Position: 17th Substitutes: Christian Salem ▲ Dean Terlich ▼

==== Round 9 ====
Round 9
Saturday, 17 May (1:40 pm)	Richmond	def. by	Melbourne	MCG (crowd: 56,910)
2.3 (15); 4.8 (32); 6.16 (52); 9.20 (74)	Q1; Q2; Q3; Final	1.3 (9); 4.5 (29); 9.6 (60); 14.7 (91)	Television broadcast: Fox Footy
Lennon 2, Edwards 2, Jackson, Riewoldt, Martin, Lloyd, Cotchin	Goals	Watts 3, Tyson 2, Pedersen 2, N.Jones, M.Jones, Riley, Dawes, Viney, Vince, Kennedy Harris
Martin, Deledio, Jackson, Cotchin	Best	Tyson, N.Jones, Pedersen, Viney, Dawes, Howe, Watts
Astbury (left knee), Cotchin (ankle)	Injuries	Neville Jetta (gastro) replaced in selected side by Jimmy Toumpas
Nil	Reports	Nil
One minute of applause was held for Australian Football League legend Tom Hafey who died earlier in the week.; Melbourne were quick to put Richmond on the back-foot with Nathan Jones kicking the first major of the day.; Despite generating most of the running offense first half, Melbourne were unable to capitalise on their opportunities and allowed Richmond to open up a 12 point lead midway through the second quarter. However a mark and goal from Jack Watts; a running shot from outside 50 from Matt Jones that bounded through for a goal and a contested mark and set shot goal from former Adelaide midfielder Aidan Riley put Melbourne 6 points in front just before half time.; The third quarter saw Richmond generating many scoring opportunities, but be wasteful with them. Meanwhile goals from Dom Tyson, Chris Dawes, Cameron Pedersen and Jack Viney saw Melbourne retake the lead at three quarter time.; In the final quarter, Richmond challenged Melbourne's lead by kicking more accurately for goal. However goals on the run from Cameron Pedersen and Bernie Vince held off the fight-back, before Jack Watts and Jay Kennedy Harris put the game out of Richmond's reach.; Debut(s) for MFC: Aidan Riley; Brownlow Votes: Nathan Jones (Western Bulldogs) 3 votes, Dustin Martin (Richmond) 2 votes, Dom Tyson (Melbourne) 1 vote Record: 3 Wins, 6 Losses, 0 Draws (78.70%); Ladder Position: 14th Substitutes: Jay Kennedy Harris ▲ Aidan Riley ▼

==== Round 10 ====
Round 10
Bye; Melbourne

==== Round 11 ====
Round 11
Saturday, 31 May (1:10 pm)	Melbourne	def. by	Port Adelaide	TIO Traeger Park (crowd: 5,655)
2.2 (14); 7.4 (48); 10.5 (65); 11.9 (75)	Q1; Q2; Q3; Final	5.4 (34); 8.4 (52); 10.9 (69); 14.11 (95)	Television broadcast: Fox Footy
Frawley 2, Bail 2, Pedersen 2, Tyson 2, Salem 2, Gawn	Goals	Schulz 2, Gray 2, Westhoff 2, White, Neade, Mitchell, Young, Boak, Ebert, Polec, Wines
Tyson, M. Jones, N. Jones, Vince, Howe, Dunn, McDonald	Best	Gray, Broadbent, Boak, Impey, Cornes, Westhoff
Nil	Injuries	Chad Wingard (concussion)
Nil	Reports	Nil
Brownlow Votes: Dom Tyson (Melbourne) 3 votes, Kane Cornes (Port Adelaide) 2 votes, Robbie Gray (Port Adelaide) 1 vote Record: 3 Wins, 7 Losses, 0 Draws (78.73%); Ladder Position: 15th Substitutes: Jimmy Toumpas ▲ Max Gawn ▼

==== Round 12 ====
Round 12
Monday, 09 June (3:20 pm)	Melbourne	def. by	Collingwood	MCG (crowd: 68,124)
1.3 (9); 2.4 (16); 3.6 (24); 3.10 (28)	Q1; Q2; Q3; Final	1.2 (8); 3.7 (25); 5.10 (40); 8.13 (61)	Television broadcast: Seven Network
N. Jones, Howe, Vince	Goals	Cloke 2, Beams 2, Pendlebury, Macaffer, Goldsack, Elliott
Cross, N. Jones, Vince, Pedersen, Dunn	Best	Young, Macaffer, Pendlebury, Lumumba, Seedsman, Swan
Nil	Injuries	Jesse White (finger) replaced in selected side by Brodie Grundy
Nil	Reports	Nil
Milestone(s): Tom McDonald (50th AFL Game); Brownlow Votes: Bernie Vince (Melbourne) 3 votes, Scott Pendlebury (Collingwood) 2 votes, Clinton Young (Collingwood) 1 vote Record: 3 Wins, 8 Losses, 0 Draws (76.51%); Ladder Position: 15th Substitutes: Jay Kennedy Harris ▲ Mark Jamar ▼

==== Round 13 ====
Round 13
Sunday, 15 June (4:40 pm)	Essendon	def. by	Melbourne	MCG (crowd: 44,622)
2.4 (16); 5.12 (42); 8.12 (60); 10.17 (77)	Q1; Q2; Q3; Final	0.3 (3); 3.3 (21); 7.6 (48); 12.6 (78)	Television broadcast: Fox Footy
Zaharakis 4, Ambrose, Ryder, Z. Merrett, Chapman, Goddard, Daniher	Goals	Pedersen 2, Frawley 2, Kent, Watts 2, N. Jones, Grimes, Vince, Salem
Zaharakis, Goddard, Dempsey, Carlisle, Hibberd, Ambrose	Best	Dunn, N. Jones, Pedersen, Viney, Frawley, Cross, Kent
Nil	Injuries	Nil
Nil	Reports	Nil
Brownlow Votes: Lynden Dunn (Melbourne) 3 votes, David Zaharakis (Essendon) 2 votes, Nathan Jones (Melbourne) 1 vote Record: 4 Wins, 8 Losses, 0 Draws (78.45%); Ladder Position: 14th Substitutes: Christian Salem ▲ Aidan Riley ▼

==== Round 14 ====
Round 14
Sunday, 22 June (4:40 pm)	Melbourne	def. by	North Melbourne	MCG (crowd: 26,615)
3.0 (18); 6.0 (36); 8.4 (52); 10.6 (66)	Q1; Q2; Q3; Final	4.5 (29); 7.8 (50); 14.12 (96); 15.17 (107)	Television broadcast: Fox Footy
Vince 3, Dawes 3, Frawley, Bail, Pedersen, Riley	Goals	Greenwood 2, Thomas 2, Mullett 2, Ziebell, Nahas, Harvey, Petrie, Cunnington, Atley, Swallow, Black, Brown
Vince, N. Jones, Cross, Dawes, Watts, Dunn	Best	Greenwood, Harvey, Atley, Firrito, Petrie, Ziebell,
Nil	Injuries	Robin Nahas (suspected broken collarbone)
Nil	Reports	Nil
Brownlow Votes: Bernie Vince (Melbourne) 3 votes, Scott Thompson (North Melbourne) 2 votes, Levi Greenwood (North Melbourne) 1 vote Record: 4 Wins, 9 Losses, 0 Draws (76.76%); Ladder Position: 15th Substitutes: Aidan Riley ▲ Christian Salem ▼

==== Round 15 ====
Round 15
Sunday, 29 June (1:10 pm)	Western Bulldogs	def.	Melbourne	Etihad Stadium (crowd: 24,953)
4.1 (25); 7.4 (46); 10.4 (64); 14.7 (91)	Q1; Q2; Q3; Final	1.3 (9); 3.4 (22); 10.5 (65); 13.7 (85)	Television broadcast: Fox Footy
Stringer 4, Bontempelli 2, Crameri, Dahlhaus, Honeychurch, Minson, Boyd, Higgins, Hunter	Goals	Jamar 3, Dawes, Grimes, Pedersen, Gawn, Watts, Vince, Viney, Jetta
Boyd, Stringer, Bontempelli, Murphy, Wallis, Stevens	Best	Howe, Jamar, Watts, Grimes, Frawley
Jason Tutt replaced in selected side by Fletcher Roberts	Injuries	Terlich (shoulder)
Nil	Reports	Nil
Debut(s): Dominic Barry; Milestones: Neville Jetta (50th AFL Game); Brownlow Votes: Marcus Bontempelli (Western Bulldogs) 3 votes, Mark Jamar (Melbourne) 2 votes, Jeremy Howe (Melbourne) 1 vote Record: 4 Wins, 10 Losses, 0 Draws (78.08%); Ladder Position: 15th Substitutes: Dominic Barry ▲ Dean Terlich ▼

==== Round 16 ====
Round 16
Saturday, 5 July (7:10 pm)	Melbourne	def. by	Fremantle	TIO Stadium (crowd: 9,290)
0.2 (2); 1.5 (11); 3.7 (25); 4.10 (34)	Q1; Q2; Q3; Final	2.1 (13); 6.3 (39); 13.5 (83); 15.7 (97)	Television broadcast: Fox Footy
Kent, Dawes, Bail, Jamar	Goals	Ballantyne 3, Mzungu 2, Pearce 2, Sutcliffe, Suban, Mayne, Sandilands, Barlow, Neale
McDonald, Kent, Tyson, Viney, M. Jones, Vince	Best	Barlow, Sandilands, Mzungu, Ballantyne, Fyfe, Ibbotson, Neale
Nil	Injuries	Nil
Nil	Reports	Nil
Brownlow Votes: Nat Fyfe (Fremantle) 3 votes, Michael Barlow (Fremantle) 2 votes, Lachie Neale (Fremantle) 1 vote Record: 4 Wins, 11 Losses, 0 Draws (74.74%); Ladder Position: 16th Substitutes: Dominic Barry ▲ Max Gawn ▼

==== Round 17 ====
Round 17
Saturday, 12 July (1:45 pm)	Melbourne	def. by	Geelong	MCG (crowd: 36,385)
0.2 (2); 2.5 (17); 4.6 (30); 5.6 (36)	Q1; Q2; Q3; Final	3.7 (25); 11.10 (76); 12.13 (85); 14.18 (102)	Television broadcast: Seven Network
Howe 2, Pedersen, Kent, Vince	Goals	Hawkins 3, Johnson 2, Kersten 2, Christensen, Motlop, Guthrie, Hartman, Duncan, McIntosh, Bartel
Riley, Viney, Garland	Best	Selwood, Motlop, Johnson, McIntosh, Mackie, Kelly, Guthrie
Nil	Injuries	Nil
Nil	Reports	Nil
Brownlow Votes: Joel Selwood (Geelong) 3 votes, Steve Johnson (Geelong) 2 votes, Harry Taylor (Geelong) 1 vote Record: 4 Wins, 12 Losses, 0 Draws (71.77%); Ladder Position: 16th Substitutes: Dean Terlich ▲ Neville Jetta ▼

==== Round 18 ====
Round 18
Sunday, 20 July (12:40 pm)	Port Adelaide	def.	Melbourne	Adelaide Oval (crowd: 37,894)
4.4 (28); 7.6 (48); 8.9 (57); 10.12 (72)	Q1; Q2; Q3; Final	2.3 (15); 5.5 (35); 8.7 (55); 10.9 (69)	Television broadcast: Fox Footy
Westhoff 2, Stewart 2, Schulz 2, Pittard, Boak, Wingard, Young	Goals	Tyson 2, Tapscott, Vince, Pedersen, Frawley, Blease, Kennedy Harris, Watts, Bail
Wines, Gray, Ebert, Westhoff, Lobbe, Cornes	Best	Tyson, N. Jones, Frawley, Jamar, Bail, Viney
Nil	Injuries	Nil
Nil	Reports	Nil
Brownlow Votes: Dom Tyson (Melbourne) 3 votes, Ollie Wines (Port Adelaide) 2 votes, Nathan Jones (Melbourne) 1 vote Record: 4 Wins, 13 Losses, 0 Draws (72.98%); Ladder Position: 17th Substitutes: Dean Kent ▲ Aidan Riley ▼

==== Round 19 ====
Round 19
Sunday, 3 August (1:10 pm)	Melbourne	def. by	Brisbane Lions	Etihad Stadium (crowd: 18,079)
3.3 (21); 4.8 (32); 5.13 (43); 6.15 (51)	Q1; Q2; Q3; Final	3.3 (21); 4.3 (27); 5.6 (36); 11.8 (74)	Television broadcast: Fox Footy
Kent 2, Frawley, N. Jones, Tyson, Bail	Goals	McStay 3, Close 2, Beams, Hanley, Merrett, Adcock, Harwood, Taylor
Howe, N. Jones, Tyson, Frawley, Terlich	Best	Rockliff, Bewick, Martin, Adcock, Hanley, Gardiner, McStay
McDonald (ankle), Pedersen (nose), Tapscott (bone bruising on knee)	Injuries	Maguire (foot)
Nil	Reports	Daniel Merrett (striking)
Brownlow Votes: Stefan Martin (Brisbane Lions) 3 votes, Nathan Jones (Melbourne) 2 votes, Rohan Bewick (Brisbane Lions) 1 vote Record: 4 Wins, 14 Losses, 0 Draws (72.78%); Ladder Position: 17th Substitutes: Jay Kennedy Harris ▲ Luke Tapscott ▼

==== Round 20 ====
Round 20
Saturday, 9 August (4:40 pm)	Hawthorn	def.	Melbourne	MCG (crowd: 37,082)
4.4 (28); 10.8 (68); 15.8 (98); 17.13 (115)	Q1; Q2; Q3; Final	2.1 (13); 4.5 (29); 7.8 (50); 9.11 (65)	Television broadcast: Fox Footy
Roughead 5, Breust 3, Hill 2, Smith 2, Lewis, Shiels, Schoenmakers, Hale, Puopolo	Goals	Gawn 2, Kent, Frawley, Viney, Kennedy Harris, Riley, Tyson, Dawes
Lewis, Roughead, Shiels, Breust, Hodge, Hill	Best	Tyson, N. Jones, Kent, Gawn, Jetta, Howe
Nil	Injuries	Nil
Jarryd Roughead (tripping)	Reports	Nil
Brownlow Votes: Jordan Lewis (Hawthorn) 3 votes, Liam Shiels (Hawthorn) 2 votes, Jarryd Roughead (Hawthorn) 1 vote Record: 4 Wins, 15 Losses, 0 Draws (71.62%); Ladder Position: 16th Substitutes: Aidan Riley ▲ Rohan Bail ▼

==== Round 21 ====
Round 21
Sunday, 17 August (3:20 pm)	Melbourne	def. by	Greater Western Sydney	MCG (crowd: 17,218)
2.4 (16); 2.9 (21); 2.11 (23); 3.16 (34)	Q1; Q2; Q3; Final	2.1 (13); 6.4 (34); 10.7 (67); 15.8 (98)	Television broadcast: Seven Network
Kent, Watts, Garland	Goals	Palmer 4, Hoskin-Elliott 3, Smith 2, Kelly, Boyd, Mumford, Shiel, Treloar
Kent, N. Jones, Tyson, Michie	Best	Mumford, Palmer, Hoskin-Elliott, Smith, Shiel, Greene, Kelly, Tomlinson
Grimes (hamstring)	Injuries	Davis (concussion), Patton (knee), Ward (calf)
Nil	Reports	Nil
Brownlow Votes: Devon Smith (Greater Western Sydney) 3 votes, Rhys Palmer (Greater Western Sydney) 2 votes, Dylan Shiel (Greater Western Sydney) 1 vote Record: 4 Wins, 16 Losses, 0 Draws (69.51%); Ladder Position: 17th Substitutes: Aidan Riley ▲ Jack Grimes ▼

==== Round 22 ====
Round 22
Saturday, 23 August (5:40 pm)	West Coast	def.	Melbourne	Patersons Stadium (crowd: 35,083)
6.1 (31); 9.5 (59); 16.9 (107); 18.11 (119)	Q1; Q2; Q3; Final	1.1 (7); 3.3 (21); 5.4 (34); 8.5 (53)	Television broadcast: Fox Footy
LeCras 4, Darling 4, Kennedy, Hill 2, Cripps, Lycett, Shuey, McGinnity, Gaff	Goals	Fitzpatrick 2, Vince, Bail, Howe, Pedersen, Dawes, Tyson
LeCras, Masten, Shuey, McGovern, Gaff	Best	Vince, N. Jones, Howe, Bail, Cross
Naitanui (Achilles soreness) replaced in selected side by Carter, Hutchings (right hamstring)	Injuries	Garland (left knee)
Nil	Reports	Nil
Milestone(s): Bernie Vince (150th AFL Game), Chris Dawes(100th AFL Game); Brownlow Votes: Mark LeCras (West Coast) 3 votes, Chris Masten (West Coast) 2 votes, Andrew Gaff (West Coast) 1 vote Record: 4 Wins, 17 Losses, 0 Draws (67.89%); Ladder Position: 17th Substitutes: Christian Salem ▲ Colin Garland ▼

==== Round 23 ====
Round 23
Saturday, 30 August (7:40 pm)	North Melbourne	def.	Melbourne	Etihad Stadium (crowd: 17,174)
4.3 (27); 8.5 (53); 13.9 (87); 19.9 (123)	Q1; Q2; Q3; Final	4.3 (27); 8.5 (53); 9.7 (61); 14.9 (93)	Television broadcast: Fox Footy
Turner 4, Brown 3, Wood 3, Ziebell 2, Petrie, Adams, Atley, Bastinac, Mullett, Dal Santo, Currie	Goals	Kent 3, Dawes 2, Fitzpatrick 2, McDonald 2, Tyson 2, Jamar, Vince, Dunn
Swallow, Atley, Wells, Ziebell, Brown, Turner, Thompson	Best	Kent, Tyson, Vince, Viney, Frawley, Dawes
Hansen (hip soreness), Adams (concussion), Grima (left quad)	Injuries	Gawn (right knee)
Nil	Reports	Nil
Milestone(s): Mark Jamar (150th AFL Game) Tom McDonald (1st AFL Goal); Brownlow Votes: Dom Tyson (Melbourne) 3 votes, Andrew Swallow (North Melbourne) 2 votes, Ben Brown (North Melbourne) 1 vote Record: 4 Wins, 18 Losses, 0 Draws (68.37%); Ladder Position: 17th Substitutes: Aidan Riley ▲ Max Gawn ▼

== Ladder ==
2014 AFL ladder
Pos	Team	Pld	W	L	D	PF	PA	PP	Pts	
1	Sydney	22	17	5	0	2126	1488	142.9	68	Finals series
2	Hawthorn (P)	22	17	5	0	2458	1746	140.8	68	Finals series
3	Geelong	22	17	5	0	2033	1787	113.8	68	Finals series
4	Fremantle	22	16	6	0	2029	1556	130.4	64	Finals series
5	Port Adelaide	22	14	8	0	2180	1678	129.9	56	Finals series
6	North Melbourne	22	14	8	0	2026	1731	117.0	56	Finals series
7	Essendon	22	12	9	1	1828	1719	106.3	50	Finals series
8	Richmond	22	12	10	0	1887	1784	105.8	48	Finals series
9	West Coast	22	11	11	0	2045	1750	116.9	44	
10	Adelaide	22	11	11	0	2175	1907	114.1	44	
11	Collingwood	22	11	11	0	1766	1876	94.1	44	
12	Gold Coast	22	10	12	0	1917	2045	93.7	40	
13	Carlton	22	7	14	1	1891	2107	89.7	30	
14	Western Bulldogs	22	7	15	0	1784	2177	81.9	28	
15	Brisbane Lions	22	7	15	0	1532	2212	69.3	28	
16	Greater Western Sydney	22	6	16	0	1780	2320	76.7	24	
17	Melbourne	22	4	18	0	1336	1954	68.4	16	
18	St Kilda	22	4	18	0	1480	2436	60.8	16	

Source: AFL Tables
Rules for classification: 1) points; 2) percentage; 3) number of points for.
(P) Premiers

=== Ladder breakdown by opposition ===
Opponent	Played	Won	Lost	Drew	Premiership points	Points for	Points against	Percentage (%)
Carlton	1	1	0	0	4	81	58	139.66
Richmond	1	1	0	0	4	91	74	122.97
Adelaide	1	1	0	0	4	70	67	104.48
Essendon	1	1	0	0	4	78	77	101.30
Gold Coast	1	0	1	0	0	78	86	90.70
Western Bulldogs	2	0	2	0	0	168	190	88.42
Port Adelaide	2	0	2	0	0	144	167	86.23
St Kilda	1	0	1	0	0	51	68	75.00
North Melbourne	2	0	2	0	0	159	230	69.13
Brisbane Lions	1	0	1	0	0	51	74	68.92
Hawthorn	1	0	1	0	0	65	115	56.52
Sydney	1	0	1	0	0	38	69	55.07
Collingwood	1	0	1	0	0	28	61	45.90
Greater Western Sydney	2	0	2	0	0	81	177	45.76
Geelong	1	0	1	0	0	36	102	35.29
Fremantle	1	0	1	0	0	34	97	35.05
West Coast	2	0	2	0	0	83	242	34.30
Total	22	4	18	0	16	1336	1954	68.38

== Tribunal/Match Review Panel cases ==
Player	Round	Charge category (Level)	Verdict	Early Plea	Points^{[a]}	Result	Victim	Club	Ref(s)
Bernie Vince	3	Reckless Contact with an Umpire (first offence)	Guilty	Yes	N/A	$1950	Ben Ryan	N/A	
Alex Georgiou	6	Striking (level one)	Guilty	Yes	93.75	Reprimand	Lance Franklin	Sydney	
Jack Viney	7	Rough Conduct	~~Guilty~~; Appealed	No (straight to tribunal)	~~200~~; 0	~~2 Matches~~; N/A	Tom Lynch	Adelaide	
Chris Dawes	9	Striking (level three)	Guilty	Yes	168.75	1 Match	Alex Rance	Richmond	
Jordie McKenzie	14	Striking (level three)	Guilty	Yes	168.75	1 Match	Lindsay Thomas	North Melbourne	
Neville Jetta	15	Rough Conduct (level two)	Guilty	Yes	185.63	1 Match	Fletcher Roberts	Western Bulldogs	
Nathan Jones	22	Reckless Contact with an Umpire (first offence)	Guilty	Yes	N/A	$1950	Matthew Leppard	N/A	
Jordie McKenzie	23	Negligent Contact with an Umpire (first offence)	Guilty	Yes	N/A	$900	Ben Ryan	N/A	
Chris Dawes	23	Striking (level two)	Guilty	Yes	145.31	1 Match	Andrew Swallow	North Melbourne	

== Awards ==
=== Brownlow Medal tally ===
Player	1 vote games	2 vote games	3 vote games	Total votes
Nathan Jones	1	3	4	(13)
Dom Tyson	3	0	2	(11)
Bernie Vince	2	0	0	(6)
Lynden Dunn	1	0	0	(3)
James Frawley	1	0	0	(3)
Mark Jamar	0	1	0	(2)
Chris Dawes	0	1	0	(2)
Jeremy Howe	0	0	2	(2)
Total	8	5	8	(42)

=== Keith 'Bluey' Truscott Medal tally (top 10) ===
Position	Player	Votes
1st	Nathan Jones	311
2nd	Dom Tyson	293
3rd	Bernie Vince	270
4th	Lynden Dunn	264
5th	Daniel Cross	238
6th	Jeremy Howe	220
7th	Tom McDonald	212
8th	James Frawley	192
9th	Neville Jetta	191
10th	Jack Watts	185

Keith 'Bluey' Truscott Trophy – Nathan Jones

Sid Anderson Memorial Trophy (Second in the Best and Fairest) – Dom Tyson

Ron Barassi Snr Memorial Trophy (Third in the Best and Fairest) – Bernie Vince

Ivor Warne-Smith Memorial Trophy (Fourth in the Best and Fairest) – Lynden Dunn

Dick Taylor Memorial Trophy (Fifth in the Best and Fairest) – Daniel Cross

Harold Ball Memorial Trophy (Best Young Player) – Dom Tyson

Troy Broadbridge Trophy (highest polling MFC player in the Casey Best and Fairest) – Max Gawn

Ron Barassi Jnr. Leadership Award – Lynden Dunn

Ian Ridley Club Ambassador Award – Jack Watts

Norm Smith Memorial Trophy (Coach's Award) – Neville Jetta

James McDonald Trophy (Best Team Man) – Daniel Cross

Leading Goalkicker Award – Chris Dawes (20)
