= Cameron Pedersen =

Australian rules footballer (born 1987)

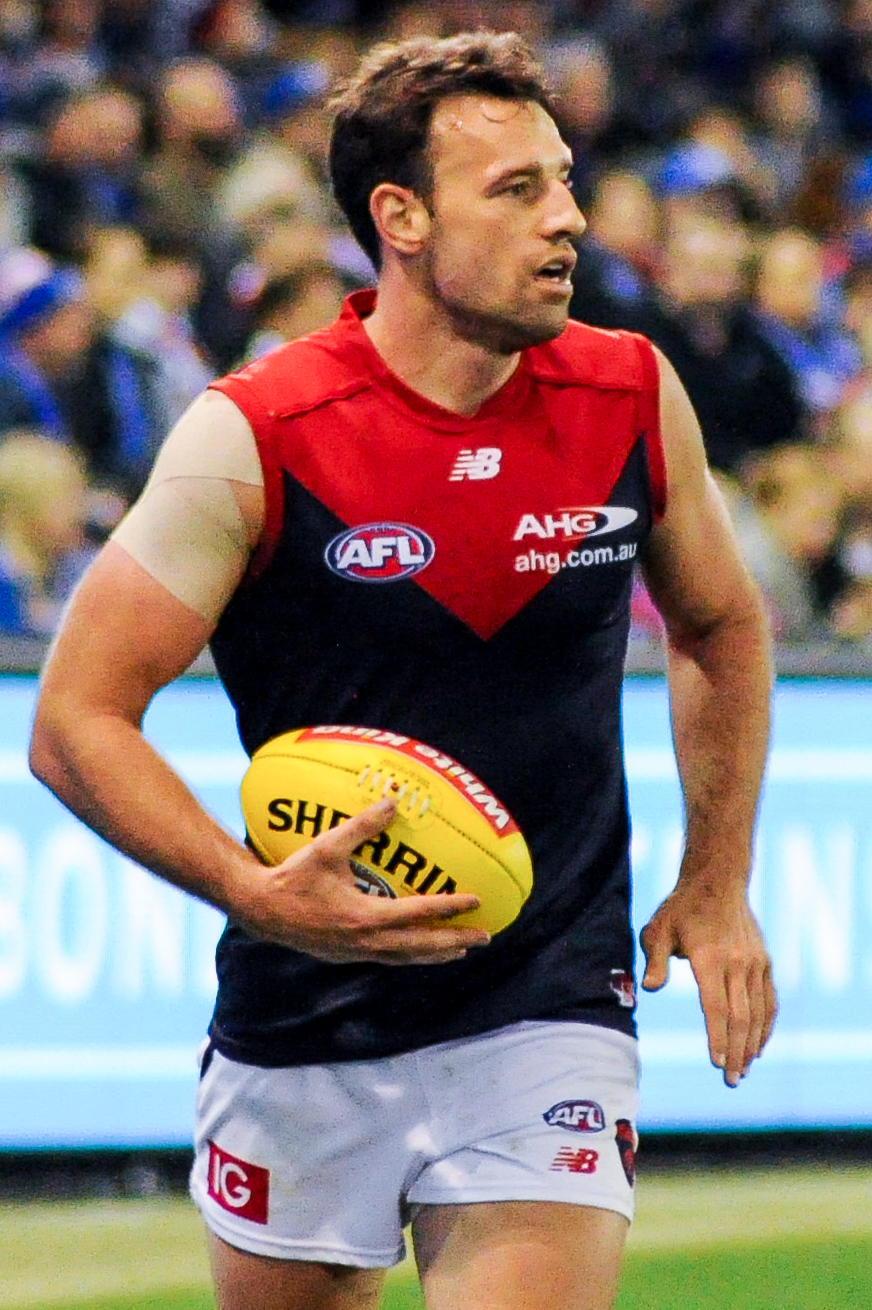
- Pedersen playing for Melbourne in June 2017

Personal information
- Full name: Cameron Pedersen
- Born: 17 March 1987 (age 39)
- Original team: Box Hill (VFL)
- Draft: No. 17, 2011 rookie draft
- Debut: Round 1, 2011, North Melbourne vs. West Coast, at Patersons Stadium
- Height: 193 cm (6 ft 4 in)
- Weight: 95 kg (209 lb)
- Position: Utility

Playing career^{1}
Years	Club	Games (Goals)
2011–2012	North Melbourne	16 (20)
2013–2018	Melbourne	64 (50)
Total		80 (70)
- ^{1} Playing statistics correct to the end of 2018 season.

Cameron Pedersen (born 17 March 1987) is a former professional Australian rules footballer who played for the North Melbourne and the Melbourne Football Club in the Australian Football League (AFL). A utility, 1.93 metres (6 ft 4 in) tall and weighing 95 kilograms (209 lb), Pedersen played the majority of his career in the forward line. After missing out on being drafted at eighteen years of age, he played five seasons in the Victorian Football League (VFL) for Box Hill. His form during the 2010 season led to him being recruited by the North Melbourne Football Club with the seventeenth selection in the 2011 rookie draft and he made his debut in the 2011 season. After two seasons with North Melbourne, playing in sixteen matches and winning the club's best first year player, he was traded to the Melbourne Football Club during the 2013 trade period.

== Pre-AFL career ==
Pedersen played his junior career with the Mooroolbark Football Club in the Eastern Football League where he won the club best and fairest at sixteen years of age in 2003. After failing to be drafted, he joined the Box Hill Hawks in the Victorian Football League (VFL) in 2006, playing in the forward line, he kicked thirty-five goals in 2009. In 2010, he was trialled as a defender and ruckman by Box Hill coach, Brendon Bolton, and he became a utility player, whereby he could play in multiple positions on the ground. In May 2010, he represented Victoria when he played for the VFL in a representative match against the West Australian Football League at Leederville Oval in Perth. After a successful season in the VFL, in which he played twenty matches and featured in the team's best players in ten matches, he was invited to train with the Gold Coast Football Club in the week leading to the 2011 pre-season and 2011 rookie drafts. It was predicted by The Age journalist, Brent Diamond, and Herald Sun journalists, Matt Windley and Nick Smart, that Pedersen would be recruited by Gold Coast in either the preseason or rookie draft.

== AFL career ==
=== 2011–2012: Early career with North Melbourne ===
After missing out on selection by the Gold Coast Football Club, Pedersen was recruited by the North Melbourne Football Club with their first selection and seventeenth overall in the 2011 rookie draft. He was temporarily promoted to the senior list prior to the start of the season in place of Ayden Kennedy who was placed on the long-term injury list. He made his AFL debut in the opening round of the 2011 season against West Coast at Patersons Stadium where he recorded twenty disposals, fourteen hitouts, five marks, four clearances and three tackles. After Todd Goldstein was a late withdrawal for North Melbourne, Pedersen was forced to play as the main ruckman against six-time All-Australian ruckman, Dean Cox. Conceding ten centimeters in height to Cox, Pedersen had the advantage in the ruckman duel and was North Melbourne's "Mr fix-it" according to The Age journalist, Tim Clarke.

Despite receiving praise for his performance in his debut match, he was omitted for the round two match against Collingwood at Etihad Stadium for the returning Todd Goldstein. He was recalled to the side for the sixty-six point loss to Geelong at Skilled Stadium in round seven. He was omitted from the side the next week for the round eight match against Melbourne at Etihad Stadium; playing in the VFL for Werribee, he kicked eight goals against the Northern Bullants in round eight of the VFL. He returned to the AFL side the next week for the forty-seven point win against Adelaide at Etihad Stadium in round eleven. He played every match for the remainder of the year, kicking eighteen goals in total, including three in a match on three separate occasions. His debut season was "excellent" according to The Age reporter, Emma Quayle, and he was rewarded with North Melbourne's best first year player award. Furthermore, his performances during the year saw him sign a two-year contract extension and he was elevated to the senior list after just the one year on the rookie list.

After playing in pre-season matches in the 2012 NAB Cup, Pedersen didn't play his first home and away season match until the twenty-five point loss to West Coast at Patersons Stadium in round six. He played just the one match before he was omitted from the side and returned to the senior side a week later for the two-point loss against Port Adelaide at AAMI Stadium in round eight as a late inclusion, before being dropped again after the one match. He did not play any more matches in the AFL for the remainder of the season, and instead played in the VFL. He had strong form in the VFL, and North Melbourne senior coach, Brad Scott, declared that, although Pedersen was playing well in the VFL and he was close to selection each week, competition for spots made it difficult for him to gain a position in the senior side. After playing in just two matches for the year and sixteen in total for North Melbourne, he was traded to the Melbourne Football Club during the trade period. Despite being contracted to North Melbourne until the end of the 2013 season, he cited the opportunity to play more senior matches as the key reason for his move to Melbourne.

=== 2013–2016: Move to Melbourne ===
After playing every pre-season match for Melbourne in the 2013 NAB Cup, he played his first home and away season match for Melbourne in the seventy-nine point loss to Port Adelaide at the Melbourne Cricket Ground in the opening round of the season, playing in a forward/ruck role. In the match, he was criticised for ducking when backing back to take a mark; he was omitted from the side the next week for the match against Essendon at the Melbourne Cricket Ground, which then-senior coach, Mark Neeld, stated the ducking incident was not the cause of his omission. After one week in the VFL playing for the Casey Scorpions, he returned to the senior side for the ninety-four point loss to West Coast at the Melbourne Cricket Ground in round three. He played in the AFL for three weeks before he was dropped for the round six match against Carlton at the Melbourne Cricket Ground.

Pedersen returned to the senior side for the ninety-five point loss to Hawthorn at the Melbourne Cricket Ground in round ten and played the next two matches before he was dropped for the match against the Western Bulldogs at the Melbourne Cricket Ground in round fourteen. His inability to maintain a position in the team led to The Age report, Jon Pierik, state that he had little impact on the field to that point. He was recalled to the AFL side for the 122-point loss to North Melbourne at Etihad Stadium and in his second match back, he played his best match of the year in the thirty-seven point loss to Greater Western Sydney, in which he recorded twenty-three disposals, seven marks and a goal, and was named in Melbourne's best players. He missed the round twenty match against Gold Coast at Metricon Stadium due to a stomach bug, and returned for his final match of the year in the sixty-eight point loss against Adelaide at AAMI Stadium in round twenty-two and finished with ten matches for the year.

Despite suffering from a hamstring injury in the weeks leading to the 2014 season, Pedersen played in the opening round match against St Kilda at Etihad Stadium, resulting in a seventeen-point loss. He was used as a permanent key-forward, and played pivotal roles in the round four win over Carlton – in which he kicked a goal with two minutes left to secure the win – and the round nine victory against Richmond, where he recorded two goals and a game-high eight tackles. He maintained a spot in the AFL side until the round twenty match against Hawthorn and he played in the VFL for two weeks until he was recalled for the sixty-six point loss to West Coast at Patersons Stadium in round twenty-two. He missed the final match of the year against North Melbourne and played nineteen matches for the year in total. It was revealed during the season that his career was all but over at the end of 2013, with his output not matching the club's expectations; he credited this frank assessment of his first season as a key reason behind his turnaround in form. He also acknowledged senior coach, Paul Roos' influence as another key reason for his improvement and he was recognised as one of the league's most improved players.

Pedersen played his first match of the 2015 season in the sixty-eight point loss to Fremantle at the Melbourne Cricket Ground in round five. He retained his spot the next week for the thirty-eight point loss to Sydney at the Melbourne Cricket Ground, however, he was substituted out of the match. He was initially omitted for the match against Hawthorn the next week, but was a late inclusion for Jesse Hogan, where he kicked three goals and was named in Melbourne's best players by Rob Forsaith of the Australian Associated Press. He retained a spot in the side for the next four weeks and played his final match of the year in the round eleven match against St Kilda, in which he suffered a season-ending injury breaking his wrist. Being the final year of his contract, it was questioned by Herald Sun journalist, Jay Clark, whether Pedersen had done enough to earn a new contract; it was announced in late September that he had signed a one-year contract.

Pedersen played in the two point win against Greater Western Sydney at the Melbourne Cricket Ground in the opening round of the 2016 season and retained his spot the next week before being omitted for the round three match against North Melbourne at Blundstone Arena. He spent the week playing in the VFL for Casey and recorded twenty-five disposals and two goals and was named in Casey's best players by Frankston Standard Leader reporter, Paul Amy. He returned to the AFL side the next week for the thirty-three point win over Richmond at the Melbourne Cricket Ground in round five and stayed in the side for five weeks before missing the round nine match against Brisbane at the Melbourne Cricket Ground due to illness. He missed two weeks of football before playing in the VFL where he suffered a shoulder injury and missed four weeks. He returned through the VFL, playing there for four weeks before returning to the AFL side for the twenty-nine point win against Hawthorn at the Melbourne Cricket Ground in round twenty as a late inclusion for Jesse Hogan. He played his final match for the year the next week in the forty point win over Port Adelaide at the Adelaide Oval and finished with nine matches for the year. With Melbourne's forward line considered difficult to break into, he was believed to be in competition with fellow forward Chris Dawes for a spot on the list in 2017 by Fox Sport Australia journalists, Riley Beveridge and Anna Harrington, and at the conclusion of the year he signed a one-year contract.

=== 2017–2018: Career best season and retirement ===
Following a hamstring injury to reigning All-Australian ruck Max Gawn and a shoulder injury to replacement Jake Spencer, Pederson was called up to the senior side after spending the first five weeks in the VFL to play as an undersized ruckman. Until the return of Gawn in round 14, Pederson played the best football of his career despite being matched against much larger adversaries such as Ben McEvoy, Sam Jacobs and Todd Goldstein.

Pederson announced his retirement on 25 September 2018 after 64 games with Melbourne and 16 with North Melbourne.

== Statistics ==
Legend
G	Goals	K	Kicks	D	Disposals	T	Tackles
B	Behinds	H	Handballs	M	Marks

Season	Team	No.	Games	Totals							Averages (per game)						
Season	Team	No.	Games	G	B	K	H	D	M	T	G	B	K	H	D	M	T
2011	North Melbourne	39	14	18	5	132	59	191	74	34	1.3	0.4	9.4	4.2	13.6	5.3	2.4
2012	North Melbourne	39	2	2	1	15	7	22	10	4	1.0	0.5	7.5	3.5	11.0	5.0	2.0
2013	Melbourne	21	10	5	2	66	69	135	57	23	0.5	0.2	6.6	6.9	13.5	5.7	2.3
2014	Melbourne	21	19	14	9	136	118	254	82	58	0.7	0.5	7.2	6.2	13.4	4.3	3.1
2015	Melbourne	21	7	6	6	46	42	88	37	18	0.9	0.9	6.6	6.0	12.6	5.3	2.6
2016	Melbourne	21	9	6	7	61	66	127	38	16	0.7	0.8	6.8	7.3	14.1	4.2	1.8
2017	Melbourne	21	15	16	8	119	124	243	73	53	1.1	0.5	7.9	8.3	16.2	4.9	3.5
2018	Melbourne	21	4	3	1	21	19	40	10	11	0.8	0.3	5.3	4.8	10.0	2.5	2.8
Career			80	70	39	596	504	1100	381	217	0.9	0.5	7.5	6.3	13.8	4.8	2.7
