= Jay Kennedy Harris =

Australian rules footballer (born 1995)

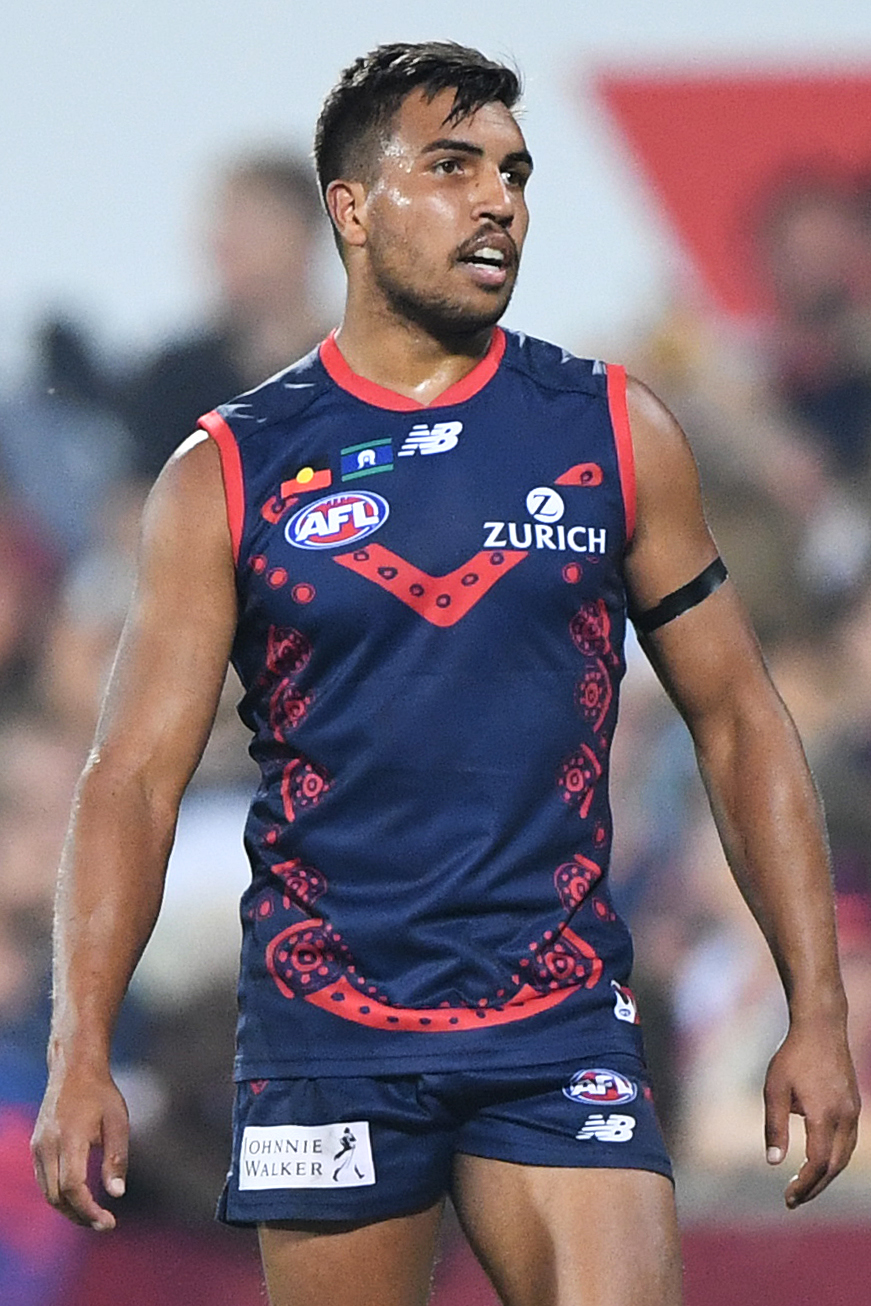
- Kennedy Harris playing for Melbourne in June 2019

Personal information
- Full name: Jay Kennedy Harris
- Nickname: JKH
- Born: 21 March 1995 (age 31)
- Original team: Oakleigh Chargers
- Draft: No. 40, 2013 national draft
- Debut: Round 1, 2014, Melbourne vs. St Kilda, at Etihad Stadium
- Height: 173 cm (5 ft 8 in)
- Weight: 75 kg (165 lb)
- Position: Forward

Club information
- Current club: Melbourne
- Number: 24

Playing career^{1}
Years	Club	Games (Goals)
2014–2019	Melbourne	39 (12)
- ^{1} Playing statistics correct to the end of 2019.

Jay Kennedy Harris (born 21 March 1995) is a former Australian rules footballer best known for his playing career with the Melbourne Football Club in the Australian Football League (AFL). A small forward, 1.73 metres (5 ft 8 in) tall and weighing 75 kilograms (165 lb), Kennedy Harris has the ability to play in both the forward line and the midfield. He entered top-level football early when he played for the Oakleigh Chargers in the TAC Cup as a bottom-aged player, in addition to representing Vic Metro in the 2013 AFL Under 18 Championships. His achievements as a junior include being the first indigenous player to captain a TAC Cup side and he was named in the TAC Cup team of the year. He was recruited by the Melbourne Football Club with the fortieth overall selection in the 2013 AFL draft and made his debut in the 2014 season.

Kennedy Harris was delisted by Melbourne shortly after the completion of the 2019 AFL season. Since leaving the AFL system, he has pursued a career in the building industry.

== Early life ==
Kennedy Harris was born to Heather Kennedy and Edgar Harris and grew up in Endeavour Hills, Victoria He is of indigenous descent (Gugu-Badhun and Yidiny) of far north Queensland. Attending St John's Regional College before moving to Trinity Grammar for year nine in 2009 as a boarder. He was encouraged by schoolmate and eventual North Melbourne player, Luke McDonald to join the Kew Comets Junior Football Club before he joined the Oakleigh Chargers in the TAC Cup as a bottom-aged player in 2012 where he was a part of their premiership winning side. After graduating from school in 2012 and commencing a science degree at the University of Melbourne in 2013, he entered his draft year as the co-captain of the Oakleigh Chargers, becoming the first indigenous player to captain a TAC Cup side. He played twelve matches for the season and was named on the interchange bench in the TAC Cup team of the year. He received mid-year state honours when he represented Vic Metro at the 2013 AFL Under 18 Championships. After his performances in the TAC Cup and under 18 championships where he played as both a small forward and midfielder, he was compared to Port Adelaide small forward, Jake Neade and then-Geelong player, Mathew Stokes, and it was predicted he would be drafted inside the top thirty in the 2013 AFL draft.

== AFL career ==
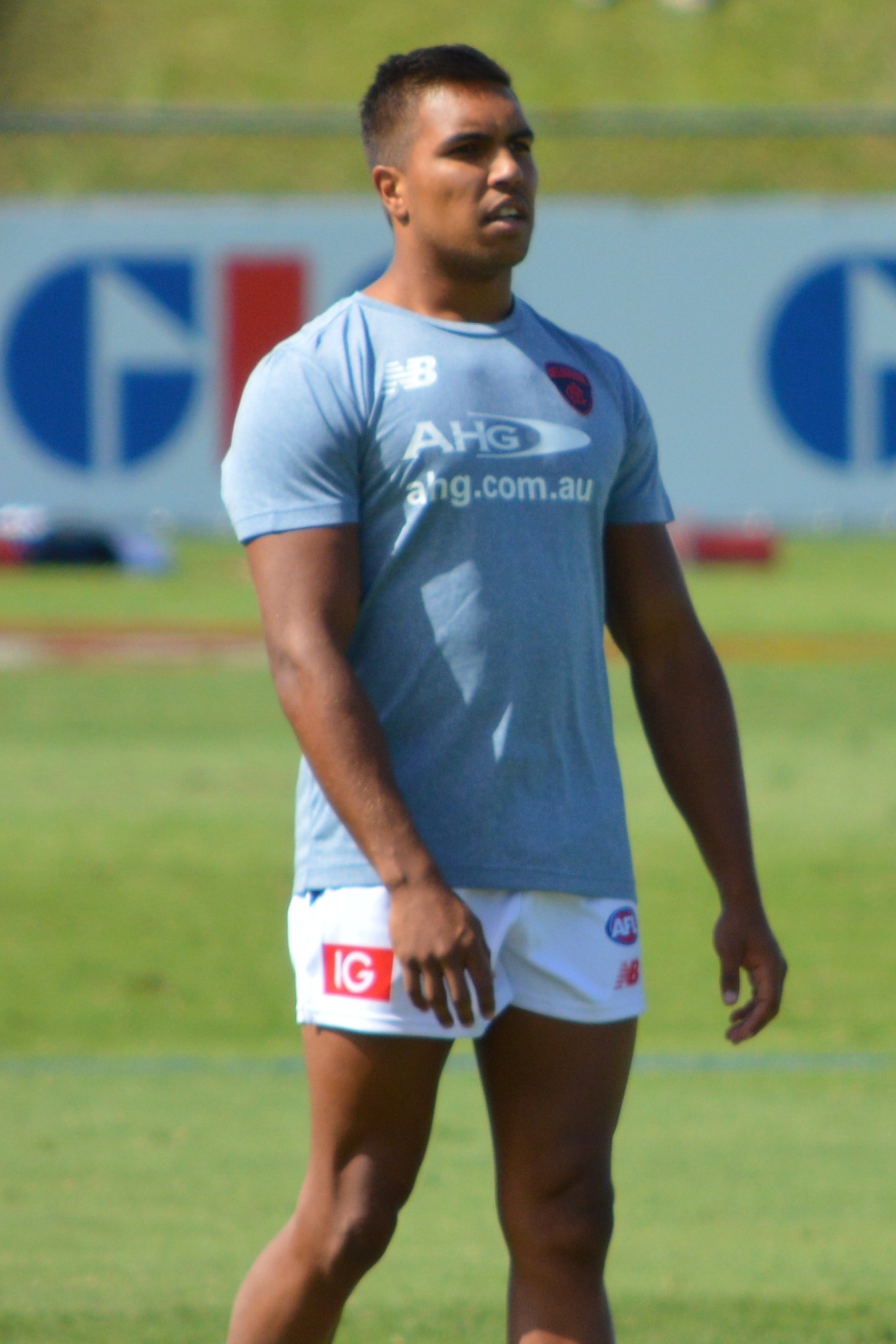
Kennedy Harris warming up prior to a pre-season match in February 2017

Kennedy Harris was drafted by the Melbourne Football Club with their second selection and fortieth overall in the 2013 national draft. His first match in Melbourne colours was in Melbourne's first match of the 2014 NAB Challenge against Richmond at Etihad Stadium, he kicked three final quarter goals to secure Melbourne an unexpected victory. He was praised during the match by AFL Media journalist, Jennifer Phelan, by stating he "demanded attention every time he went near the ball with his speed, courage and creativity." His performances in the pre-season earned him a round one debut in the seventeen point loss against St Kilda at Etihad Stadium. He played the first eleven matches for the season before he was omitted for the round thirteen match against Essendon at the Melbourne Cricket Ground. He spent the next month in the Victorian Football League (VFL) for Melbourne's affiliate team, the Casey Scorpions, before being recalled to the senior side for the three point loss against Port Adelaide at Adelaide Oval in round eighteen. He played the next two matches before being dropped for the round twenty-one match against Greater Western Sydney at the Melbourne Cricket Ground, and missed the remainder of the season. He managed fourteen games in his debut season — starting as the substitute in six games — and kicked nine goals.

On the eve of the 2015 season, Kennedy Harris signed a two-year contract extension, tying him to the club until the end of the 2017 season, and played for the Indigenous All-Stars in the nine point loss against West Coast at Leederville Oval. After the recruitment of Carlton small forward, Jeff Garlett, Kennedy Harris struggled to maintain a spot in the senior side. He played in the opening round win against Gold Coast at the Melbourne Cricket Ground, before he was omitted for the round two match against Greater Western Sydney at StarTrack Oval. He returned the next week for the twenty-five point loss against Adelaide at Adelaide Oval, replacing the injured Jack Viney. He played every match until the round seven match against Hawthorn at the Melbourne Cricket Ground due to a groin injury. He missed the next month of football, before returning from injury through the VFL Development League. He played three AFL matches in the second half of the season to finish with eight matches in total.

The 2016 season saw Kennedy Harris suffer from a hamstring injury on three separate occasions, he first injured it during the pre-season and the second time during the opening match of the VFL season against Frankston at Casey Fields. He returned to play in the VFL in June, before he was ruled out for the next four to six weeks when he injured his hamstring for the third time during the season. He managed to return to the VFL for the end of the season, playing four matches in August. His injury interrupted season meant he did not play a senior AFL match for the year.

== Statistics ==
Statistics are correct to the end of the 2019 season

Legend
G	Goals	K	Kicks	D	Disposals	T	Tackles
B	Behinds	H	Handballs	M	Marks

Season	Team	No.	Games	Totals							Averages (per game)						
Season	Team	No.	Games	G	B	K	H	D	M	T	G	B	K	H	D	M	T
2014	Melbourne	24	14	9	6	75	65	140	30	27	0.6	0.4	5.4	4.6	10.0	2.1	1.9
2015	Melbourne	24	8	2	3	40	33	73	22	14	0.3	0.4	5.0	4.1	9.1	2.8	1.8
2016	Melbourne	24	0	—	—	—	—	—	—	—	—	—	—	—	—	—	—
2017	Melbourne	24	6	0	1	45	51	96	18	23	0.0	0.2	7.5	8.5	16.0	3.0	3.8
2018	Melbourne	24	6	1	4	42	46	88	17	28	0.2	0.7	7.0	7.7	14.7	2.8	4.7
2019	Melbourne	24	5	0	0	48	37	85	23	11	0.0	0.0	9.6	7.4	17.0	4.6	2.2
Career			39	12	14	250	232	482	110	103	0.3	0.4	6.4	5.9	12.4	2.8	2.6

== Acting ==
Before being recruited into the AFL, Kennedy Harris had a regular role in the 2010 ABC1 TV show, Dead Gorgeous, starring in all 13 episodes as Charlie. He has also been in an episode of Neighbours, credited as Cub Scout No. 2, and was in the film, Blessed, as Young Jimmy. Kennedy Harris was also in a protective services officers recruitment campaign commercial by Victoria Police.

== Filmography ==
Year	Title	Role	Notes
2009	Neighbours	Cub Scout No. 2	1 episode; Episode: 1.5646
2009	Blessed	Young Jimmy	Film debut
2010	Dead Gorgeous	Charlie	13 episodes
