= Alex Georgiou =

Australian rules footballer

Personal information
- Full name: Alexis Georgiou
- Born: 1 February 1990 (age 36)
- Original team: Norwood (SANFL)
- Draft: No. 35, 2014 Rookie Draft, Melbourne
- Height: 187 cm (6 ft 2 in)
- Weight: 88 kg (194 lb)

Playing career^{1}
Years	Club	Games (Goals)
2014	Melbourne	7 (0)
- ^{1} Playing statistics correct to the end of 2014.

Alexis Georgiou (born 1 February 1990) is an Australian rules footballer who played for the Melbourne Football Club in the Australian Football League (AFL).

== Career ==
Georgiou was recruited by the club in the 2014 Rookie Draft, with pick #35 from the Norwood football club in the SANFL. Alex played in the 2012 and 2013 grand finals victories for Norwood defeating West Adelaide and North Adelaide respectively. He was upgraded to the senior list prior to the season and made his debut in Round 1, 2014, against St Kilda.

Georgiou was delisted at the conclusion of the 2014 AFL season.

== Statistics ==
Legend
G	Goals	K	Kicks	D	Disposals	T	Tackles
B	Behinds	H	Handballs	M	Marks

Season	Team	No.	Games	Totals							Averages (per game)							Votes
Season	Team	No.	Games	G	B	K	H	D	M	T	G	B	K	H	D	M	T	Votes
2014	Melbourne	41	7	0	0	34	37	71	24	10	0.0	0.0	4.9	5.3	10.1	3.4	1.4	0
Career			7	0	0	34	37	71	24	10	0.0	0.0	4.9	5.3	10.1	3.4	1.4	0
