= Aidan Riley =

Australian rules footballer

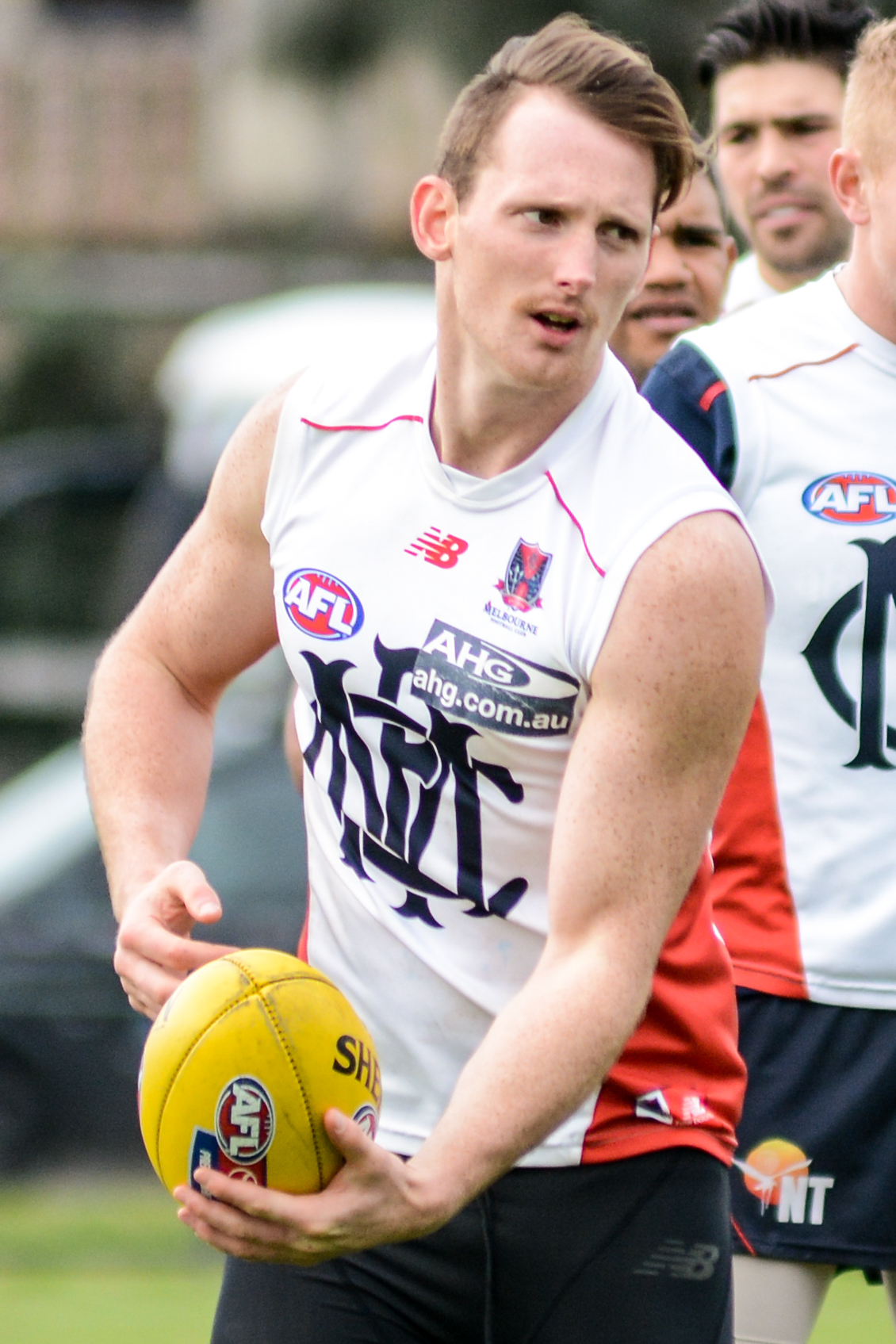
- Riley at training during July 2015

Personal information
- Full name: Aidan Riley
- Born: 13 December 1991 (age 34)
- Original team: Wollongong Lions (Sydney AFL)
- Draft: No. 58, 2010 Rookie draft
- Debut: Round 19, 2011, Adelaide vs. Port Adelaide, at AAMI Stadium
- Height: 183 cm (6 ft 0 in)
- Weight: 84 kg (185 lb)
- Position: Midfielder

Playing career^{1}
| Years | Club | Games (Goals) |
| 2011–2013 | Adelaide | 12 (5) |
| 2014–2015 | Melbourne | 13 (3) |
| Total | | 25 (8) |
- ^{1} Playing statistics correct to the end of 2015.

Aidan Riley is a former professional Australian rules footballer who played for the Adelaide Football Club and Melbourne Football Club in the Australian Football League (AFL). He initially joined Adelaide in 2011 via the NSW scholarship program, before joining Melbourne as a delisted free agent in November 2013. He made his debut in 2011, against Port Adelaide in Showdown XXXI.

He was delisted at the conclusion of the 2015 season.

== Statistics ==
Legend
| G | Goals | K | Kicks | D | Disposals | T | Tackles |
| B | Behinds | H | Handballs | M | Marks |

| Season | Team | No. | Games | Totals | | | | | | | Averages (per game) | | | | | | | Votes |
| Season | Team | No. | Games | G | B | K | H | D | M | T | G | B | K | H | D | M | T | Votes |
|---|---|---|---|---|---|---|---|---|---|---|---|---|---|---|---|---|---|---|
| 2011 | Adelaide | 43 | 5 | 1 | 2 | 15 | 18 | 33 | 8 | 12 | 0.2 | 0.4 | 3.0 | 3.6 | 6.6 | 1.6 | 2.4 | 0 |
| 2012 | Adelaide | 43 | 5 | 3 | 0 | 29 | 26 | 55 | 12 | 13 | 0.6 | 0.0 | 5.8 | 5.2 | 11.0 | 2.4 | 2.6 | 0 |
| 2013 | Adelaide | 43 | 2 | 1 | 0 | 6 | 8 | 14 | 3 | 0 | 0.5 | 0.0 | 3.0 | 4.0 | 7.0 | 1.5 | 0.0 | 0 |
| 2014 | Melbourne | 27 | 9 | 3 | 5 | 42 | 58 | 100 | 14 | 31 | 0.3 | 0.6 | 4.7 | 6.4 | 11.1 | 1.6 | 3.4 | 0 |
| 2015 | Melbourne | 27 | 4 | 0 | 0 | 11 | 25 | 36 | 11 | 5 | 0.0 | 0.0 | 2.7 | 6.3 | 9.0 | 2.8 | 1.5 | 0 |
| Career | | | 25 | 8 | 7 | 103 | 135 | 238 | 48 | 61 | 0.3 | 0.3 | 4.1 | 5.4 | 9.5 | 1.9 | 2.4 | 0 |
