= Dom Tyson =

Australian rules footballer (born 1993)

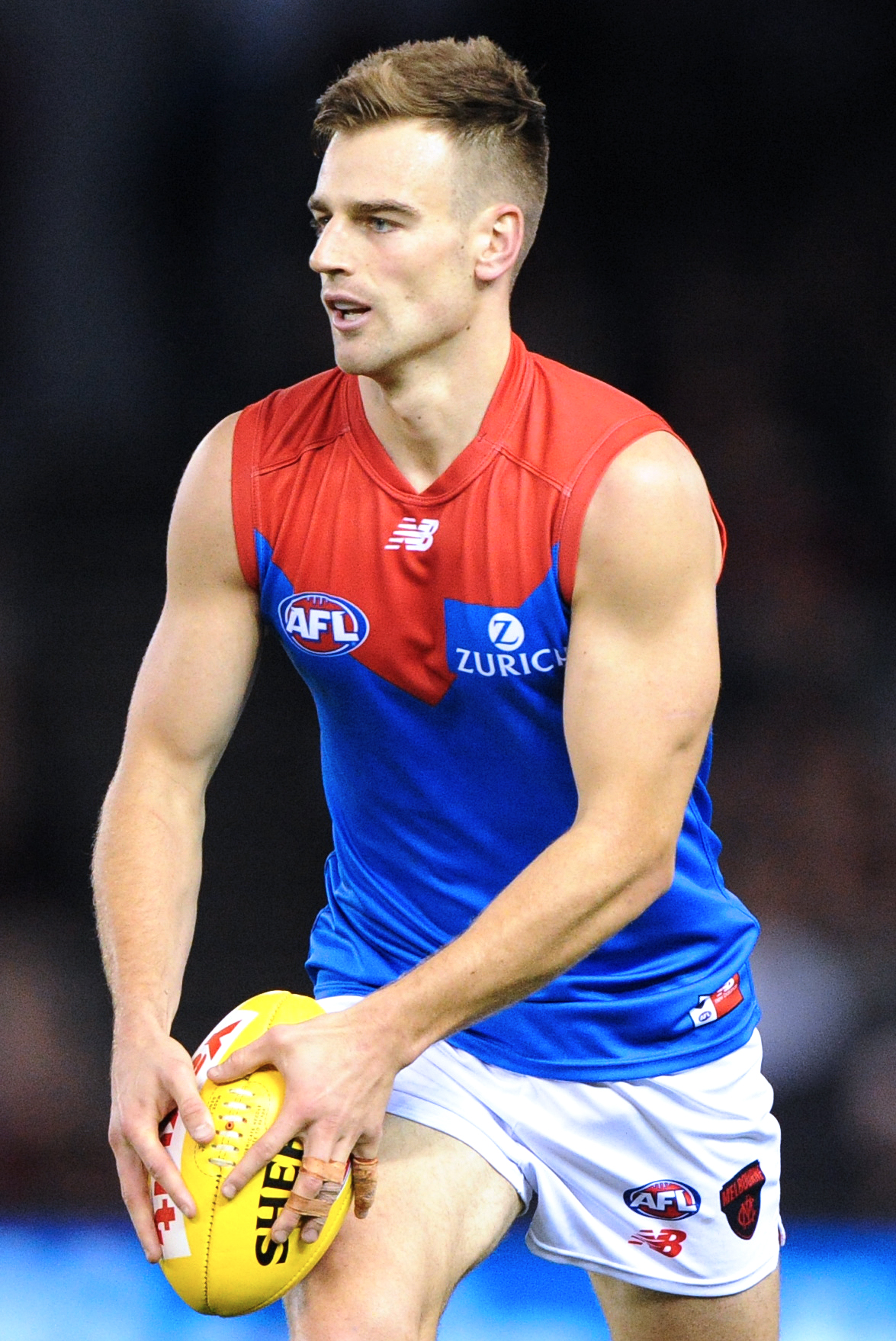
- Tyson playing for Melbourne in April 2018

Personal information
- Born: 8 June 1993 (age 33)
- Original team: Oakleigh Chargers (TAC Cup)
- Draft: No. 3, 2011 national draft
- Debut: Round 1, 2012, Greater Western Sydney vs. Sydney, at ANZ Stadium
- Height: 186 cm (6 ft 1 in)
- Weight: 85 kg (187 lb)
- Position: Midfielder

Playing career^{1}
| Years | Club | Games (Goals) |
| 2012–2013 | Greater Western Sydney | 13 (4) |
| 2014–2018 | Melbourne | 94 (40) |
| 2019–2021 | North Melbourne | 6 (1) |
| Total | | 113 (45) |
- ^{1} Playing statistics correct to the end of 2021.

Career highlights
- Harold Ball Memorial Trophy: 2014; AFL Rising Star nominee: 2012

Dom Tyson (born 8 June 1993) is a former professional Australian rules footballer playing in the Australian Football League (AFL). A midfielder, 1.86 metres (6 ft 1 in) tall and weighing 85 kilograms (187 lb), Tyson is capable of contributing as both an inside and outside midfielder. He was recognised as a talented footballer from a young age when he represented Victoria in the under 12 championships. Queries were raised over his versatility as a midfielder after he missed out on selection in the under 16 championships. Despite this, he was recruited by the Oakleigh Chargers in the TAC Cup as a bottom-aged player, and was named their captain the following year. In addition, he represented Vic Metro in the 2011 AFL Under 18 Championships, which earned him All-Australian honours. His improvement towards the end of his junior career saw him recruited by the Greater Western Sydney Giants with the third selection in the 2011 AFL draft. He made his AFL debut in the 2012 season and earned an AFL Rising Star nomination. After two years with Greater Western Sydney and playing in thirteen matches, he was traded to the Melbourne Football Club during the 2013 trade period.

== Early life ==
Tyson played his junior career with the Camberwell Junior Football Club, who have subsequently named an academy after him for young talented players at the club. He was recognised as a talented player at a young age by representing Victoria in the under-12 championships in 2005. He attended and played school football for Trinity Grammar School. After missing out on state selection for the under-16 Victoria Metro side in 2009, queries were raised over his pace and ability to be more than an inside-midfielder. He was recruited by the Oakleigh Chargers as a bottom-aged player in 2010 to play in the TAC Cup, playing 14 games for the season.

Tyson was elected the captain for Oakleigh in 2011 and led the team to a grand final for the first time since 2006, but ultimately lost to the Sandringham Dragons by eight points. He received mid-year state honours by representing Victoria Metro at the 2011 AFL Under 18 Championships, and played in the winning final against Victoria Country. His season was rewarded with All-Australian selection as the ruck-rover. He raised his draft chances in his final year after expanding his game beyond being just an inside-midfielder and was labelled a "complete midfielder" by Oakleigh Chargers coach, Greg Doyle. After drawing comparisons to Simon Black and Jimmy Bartel, he was predicted to be drafted inside the top-five in the weeks leading to the 2011 AFL draft.

== AFL career ==
=== 2012–2013: Early career at Greater Western Sydney ===
Tyson was recruited by Greater Western Sydney with their third selection and third overall in the 2011 national draft. He debuted in the opening round of the 2012 season against Sydney at ANZ Stadium in which he started as the substitute. He was the round 23 nomination for the Rising Star after the twenty-eight point loss to North Melbourne at Škoda Stadium, where he recorded twenty-six disposals, seven clearances, five marks and a goal. He managed ten games in his debut season after suffering from leg and back injuries for a majority of the season. In October, speculation arose that he would move to the Richmond Football Club after they expressed an interest in securing a trade for him. After stating he would be open to a move back to Melbourne, he ultimately stayed with Greater Western Sydney.

The start to Tyson's 2013 season was delayed after he tore his posterior cruciate ligament during the off-season; he played his first match for the season in May with Greater Western Sydney's reserves side in the North East Australian Football League (NEAFL). He managed three senior games for 2013, and after thirteen matches in total for Greater Western Sydney, he was traded to the Melbourne Football Club in October, despite being contracted until the end of 2015. He cited the opportunity to return home to Victoria as the key reason for the move, and was lauded by Melbourne coach, Paul Roos, as an "absolute superstar in the making".

=== 2014–2018: Melbourne ===
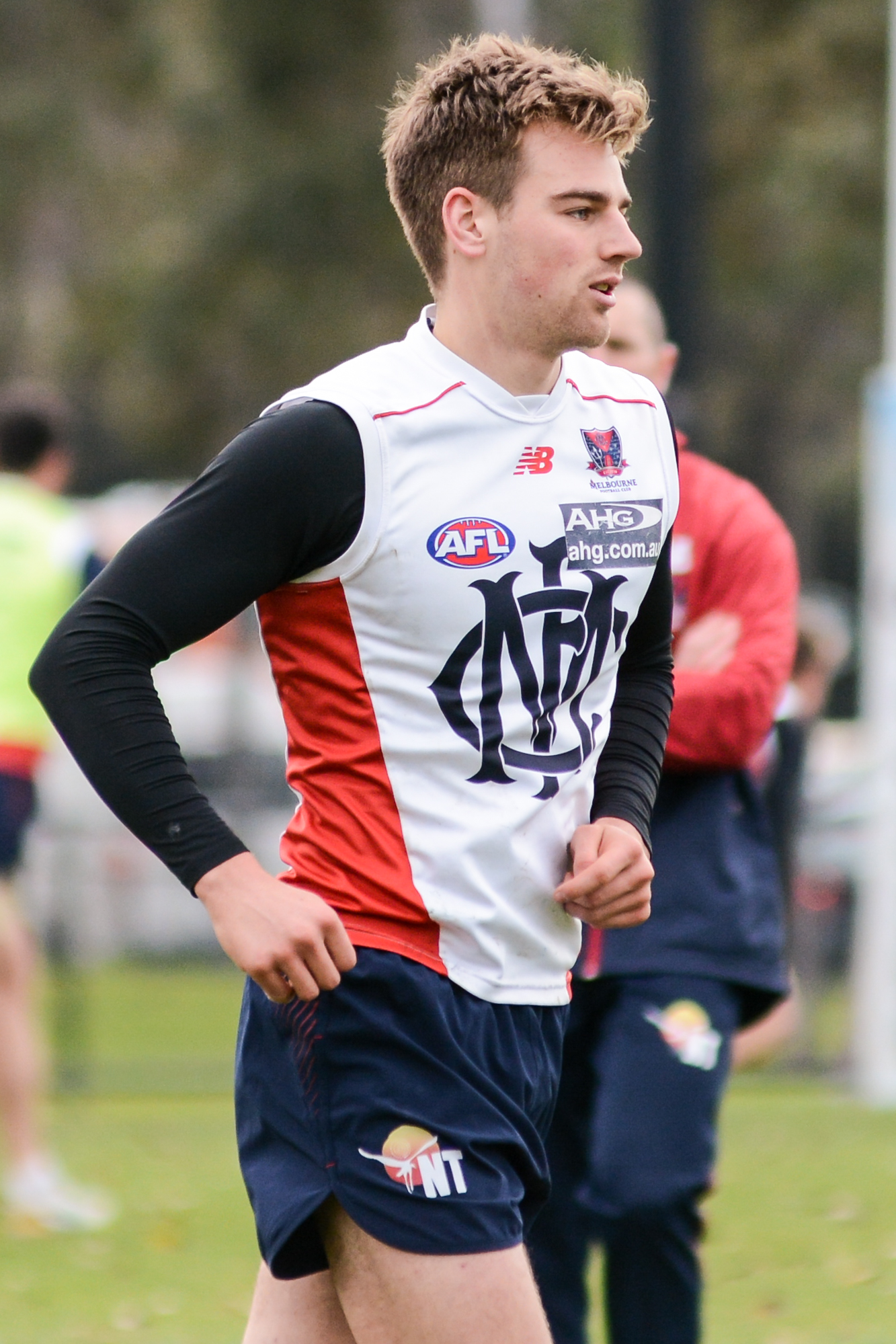
Tyson at training in July 2015

Tyson's first season at Melbourne saw him play senior football consistently for the first time in his career, playing all matches for the season, despite suffering a finger injury in round nine, which resulted in end of season surgery. He received high praise during the season, especially for his performance against Richmond in round nine, with the Herald Sun's Jay Clark stating he was best afield and had a "coolness and classy edge to his game"; in addition to both matches against Port Adelaide in rounds eleven and eighteen with then-Melbourne coach, Paul Roos, stating Tyson's performances had proven criticisers of the high price trade for him wrong. He acknowledged the reason for his improved season was due to moving home to Victoria and having a more settled environment. His season was rewarded with a second-place finish in the Keith 'Bluey' Truscott Medal with 293 votes, finishing behind Nathan Jones. He received eleven votes in the Brownlow Medal count, the most for any player recruited in the 2011 draft, and was awarded the Harold Ball Memorial Trophy as Melbourne's best young player.

Tyson played in the first seven matches of the 2015 season before succumbing to a knee injury, which was initially injured in the round four match against Richmond. He returned to the senior side in round eleven for the two point loss against St Kilda at Etihad Stadium, and played every match until the round nineteen loss against North Melbourne—which was also his 50th AFL match—before missing the remainder of the season with a hamstring injury. In what was described as a frustrating and inconsistent season by Tyson, he managed fifteen matches and finished thirteenth in the best and fairest count with 130 votes.

After playing the first eight matches of the 2016 season, Tyson was forced to miss the sixty-three point win against the Brisbane Lions at the Melbourne Cricket Ground in round nine after he was a late withdrawal due to illness. He returned the next week for the forty-five point loss against Port Adelaide at TIO Traeger Park and he did not miss a match for the remainder of the season. He played his fiftieth match for the club in the twenty-two point loss against Adelaide at the Melbourne Cricket Ground in round thirteen. His performance in the twenty-nine point win against Hawthorn at the Melbourne Cricket Ground in round twenty received praise from then-Melbourne coach, Paul Roos, who described his performance as "elite", in which Tyson recorded thirty disposals, thirteen contested possessions, a game-high eleven score involvements and two goals. His form continually improved throughout the season, which saw him named in the AFL Media team of the week three times, and his "huge improvement" during the season was also a catalyst for Melbourne's rise on the ladder, according to Fox Sports Australia journalist, Anna Harrington. His performances in the season saw him finish fourth in Melbourne's best and fairest count with 357 votes. Despite being contracted until the end of the 2017 season, he signed a contract extension in September, tying him to the club until the end of 2019.

During the 2017 pre-season, as part of a Melbourne training camp before the Christmas break, Tyson partially dislocated one of his patella tendons which forced him to miss a majority of pre-season training. He played his first match of the year in Melbourne's final game of the JLT Community Series, in which he recorded twenty-four disposals playing two-thirds of the match against West Coast. After being "underdone" for round one, he played his first AFL match of the season in the twenty-two point win against Carlton at the Melbourne Cricket Ground in round two. Being crucial in the victory according to the Australian Associated Press, he recorded thirty-two disposals and received two Brownlow votes, indicating he was judged as the second best player on the ground by the field umpires. He played fourteen consecutive matches before experiencing knee soreness during the thirty-five point loss to Sydney at the Melbourne Cricket Ground in round fifteen. The knee injury forced him to miss the next two matches against Carlton at the Melbourne Cricket Ground and Adelaide at TIO Stadium. He returned for the twenty-three point win against Port Adelaide at the Melbourne Cricket Ground in round eighteen and played the remainder of the season. Playing nineteen matches for the year, he finished tenth in Melbourne's best and fairest count with 275 votes.

=== 2019–2021: North Melbourne ===
At the conclusion of the 2018 season, Tyson was traded to North Melbourne.

After six games in three years for North Melbourne, Tyson was delisted at the conclusion of the 2021 AFL season.

== Statistics ==
Statistics are correct to the end of the 2018 season

Legend
| G | Goals | K | Kicks | D | Disposals | T | Tackles |
| B | Behinds | H | Handballs | M | Marks |

| Season | Team | No. | Games | Totals | | | | | | | Averages (per game) | | | | | | |
| Season | Team | No. | Games | G | B | K | H | D | M | T | G | B | K | H | D | M | T |
|---|---|---|---|---|---|---|---|---|---|---|---|---|---|---|---|---|---|
| 2012 | Greater Western Sydney | 29 | 10 | 4 | 0 | 68 | 90 | 158 | 46 | 23 | 0.4 | 0.0 | 6.8 | 9 | 15.8 | 4.6 | 2.3 |
| 2013 | Greater Western Sydney | 29 | 3 | 0 | 1 | 20 | 20 | 40 | 8 | 7 | 0.0 | 0.3 | 6.7 | 6.7 | 13.3 | 2.7 | 2.3 |
| 2014 | Melbourne | 12 | 22 | 16 | 6 | 269 | 253 | 522 | 120 | 70 | 0.7 | 0.3 | 12.2 | 11.5 | 23.7 | 5.5 | 3.2 |
| 2015 | Melbourne | 12 | 15 | 6 | 6 | 152 | 173 | 325 | 51 | 65 | 0.4 | 0.4 | 9.5 | 11.5 | 21.0 | 3.4 | 4.3 |
| 2016 | Melbourne | 12 | 21 | 11 | 11 | 230 | 299 | 529 | 87 | 90 | 0.5 | 0.5 | 11.0 | 14.2 | 25.2 | 4.1 | 4.3 |
| 2017 | Melbourne | 12 | 19 | 5 | 9 | 224 | 256 | 480 | 78 | 75 | 0.3 | 0.5 | 11.8 | 13.5 | 25.3 | 4.1 | 3.9 |
| 2018 | Melbourne | 12 | 17 | 2 | 6 | 148 | 192 | 340 | 65 | 47 | 0.1 | 0.4 | 8.7 | 11.3 | 20.0 | 3.8 | 2.8 |
| Career | | | 107 | 44 | 39 | 1111 | 1283 | 2394 | 455 | 377 | 0.4 | 0.4 | 10.4 | 12.0 | 22.4 | 4.3 | 3.5 |

== Personal life ==
Outside of football, Tyson is an avid golfer and started a golf clothing brand in February 2017, called clutchandco.

Tyson is currently studying a Bachelor of Commerce at Deakin University.
