= Viv Michie =

Australian rules footballer

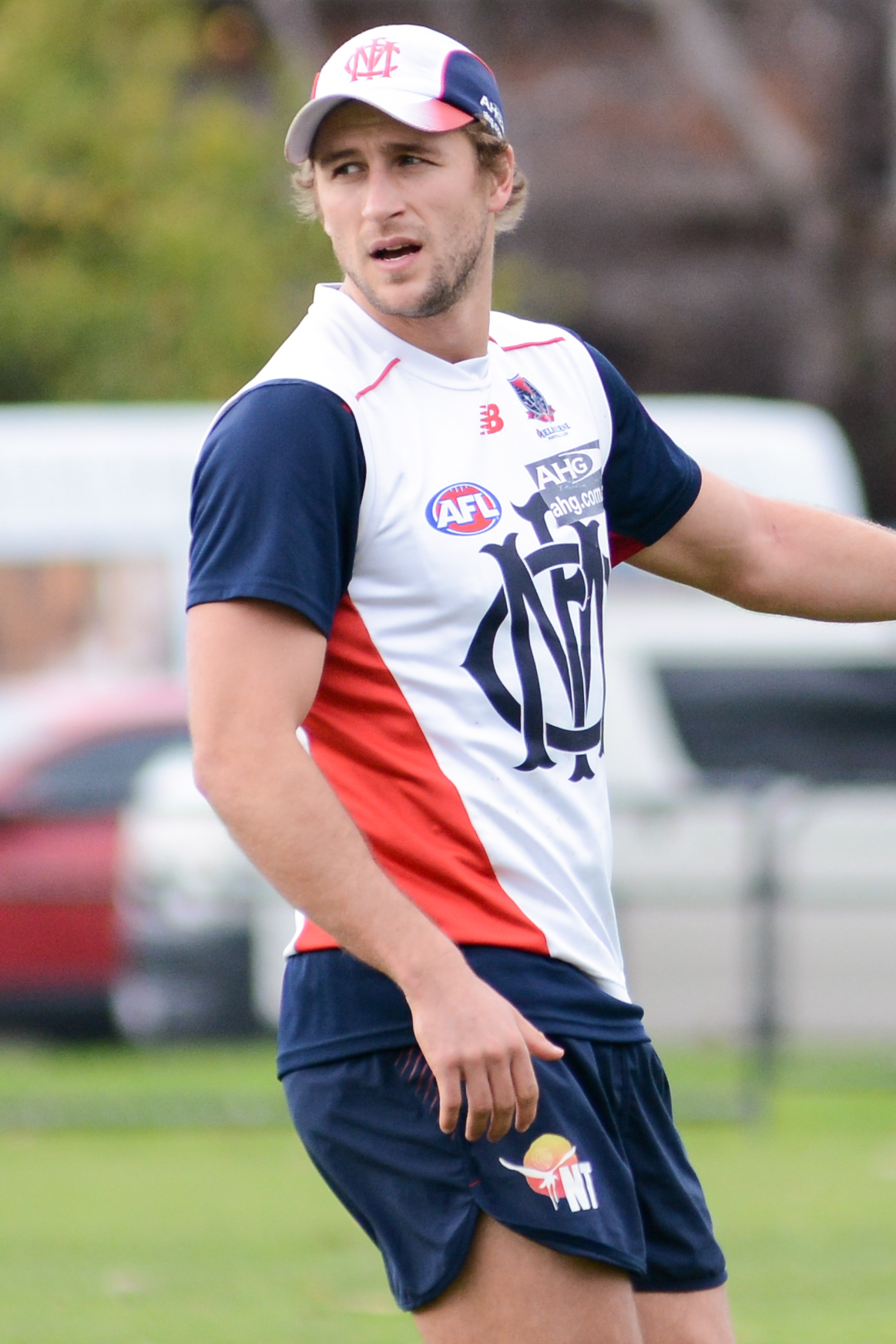
- Michie at training in July 2015

Personal information
- Full name: Vivian Michie
- Born: 23 February 1992 (age 34)
- Original team: Oakleigh Chargers (TAC Cup)
- Draft: No. 44, 2010 national draft
- Debut: Round 14, 2013, Fremantle vs. Geelong, at Simonds Stadium
- Height: 185 cm (6 ft 1 in)
- Weight: 83 kg (183 lb)
- Position: Midfielder

Playing career^{1}
Years	Club	Games (Goals)
2011–2013	Fremantle	1 (0)
2014–2016	Melbourne	21 (1)
Total		22 (1)
- ^{1} Playing statistics correct to the end of 2016.

Vivian Michie (born 23 February 1992) is a former professional Australian rules footballer who played for the Fremantle Football Club and Melbourne Football Club in the Australian Football League (AFL).

Michie played junior football for the Fitzroy Juniors and Oakleigh Chargers in the TAC Cup. He showed his agility at the AFL pre-draft testing, finishing third in the agility run. He represented Victoria Metro at the 2010 AFL Under 18 Championships.

He was drafted by Fremantle with their 2nd selection, 44th overall, in the 2010 AFL draft.

Michie struggled to play any football in his first two seasons at the club due to stress fractures in his right foot. He played his first AFL game for Fremantle as a late replacement for Lee Spurr in Round 14 of the 2013 AFL season, against the Geelong Football Club, after performing well in the West Australian Football League (WAFL) for Peel Thunder, for whom he won the best and fairest award for 2013.

Michie was traded to the Melbourne Football Club during the 2013 Trade Period for pick 54. He was delisted by Melbourne in November 2015, but was re-drafted in the 2016 rookie draft. At the conclusion of the 2016 season, he was delisted again by Melbourne.

== Statistics ==
Legend
G	Goals	K	Kicks	D	Disposals	T	Tackles
B	Behinds	H	Handballs	M	Marks

Season	Team	No.	Games	Totals							Averages (per game)						
Season	Team	No.	Games	G	B	K	H	D	M	T	G	B	K	H	D	M	T
2011	Fremantle	20	0	—	—	—	—	—	—	—	—	—	—	—	—	—	—
2012	Fremantle	20	0	—	—	—	—	—	—	—	—	—	—	—	—	—	—
2013	Fremantle	20	1	0	0	7	6	13	1	3	0.0	0.0	7.0	6.0	13.0	1.0	3.0
2014	Melbourne	22	6	0	0	47	58	105	24	18	0.0	0.0	7.8	9.7	17.5	4.0	3.0
2015	Melbourne	22	11	0	4	83	78	161	31	24	0.0	0.4	7.5	7.1	14.1	2.8	2.2
2016	Melbourne	22	4	1	0	24	35	59	14	5	0.3	0.0	6.0	8.8	14.8	3.5	1.3
Career			22	1	4	161	177	338	70	50	0.1	0.2	7.3	8.1	15.4	3.2	2.3
