= Rohan Bail =

Australian rules footballer

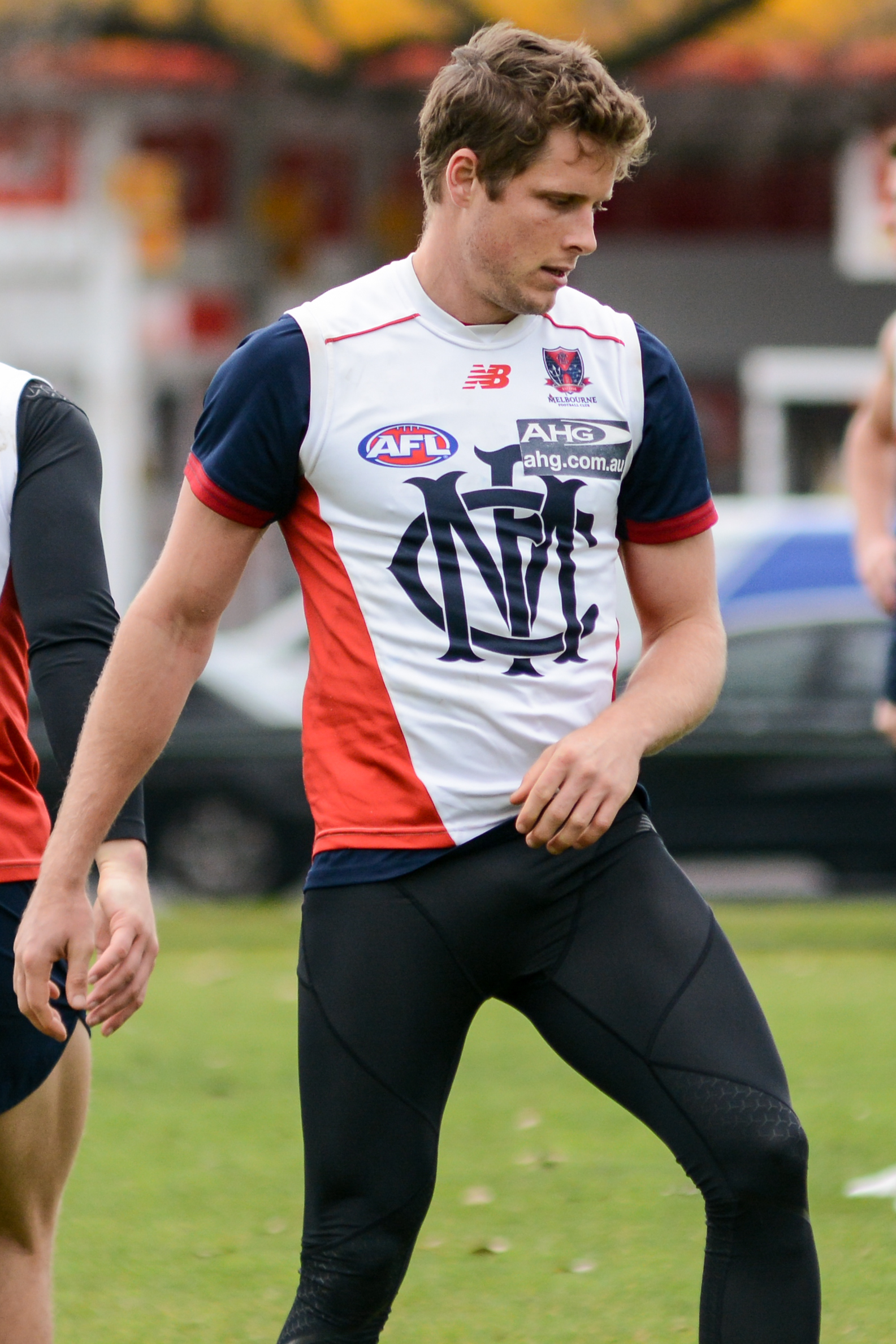
- Bail at training during July 2015

Personal information
- Full name: Rohan Bail
- Born: 26 June 1988 (age 38)
- Original team: Mount Gravatt (QAFL)
- Draft: #64, 2008 National Draft
- Debut: Round 1, 2009, Melbourne vs. North Melbourne, at MCG
- Height: 183 cm (6 ft 0 in)
- Weight: 82 kg (181 lb)
- Position: Forward

Playing career^{1}
Years	Club	Games (Goals)
2009–2015	Melbourne	71 (28)
- ^{1} Playing statistics correct to the end of 2015.

Rohan Bail (born 26 June 1988) is a former professional Australian rules footballer who played for the Melbourne Football Club in the Australian Football League (AFL).

Bail began his junior football career playing for the Ferny Grove Falcons and after competing in numerous seasons with the club moved to the Mount Gravatt Football Club to continue with senior football.

He was recruited from Mount Gravatt in the Queensland Australian Football League with Melbourne's final selection, number 64 overall, in the 2008 AFL draft, after being overlooked in the previous two drafts. He finished fourth in the 2008 Grogan Medal, awarded to the best player in the Queensland league.

Bail made his AFL debut in Round 19 of the 2009 AFL season, but had only one kick before he injured his quadriceps muscle.

He was delisted at the conclusion of the 2015 season, and in 2016 will play for St Kevin's Old Boys in Premier section of the VAFA.

== Statistics ==
Legend
G	Goals	K	Kicks	D	Disposals	T	Tackles
B	Behinds	H	Handballs	M	Marks

Season	Team	No.	Games	Totals							Averages (per game)						
Season	Team	No.	Games	G	B	K	H	D	M	T	G	B	K	H	D	M	T
2009	Melbourne	41	1	0	0	1	0	1	0	0	0.0	0.0	1.0	0.0	1.0	0.0	0.0
2010	Melbourne	44	9	4	0	83	71	154	40	32	0.4	0.0	9.2	7.9	17.1	4.4	3.6
2011	Melbourne	44	8	1	3	83	62	145	25	40	0.1	0.4	10.4	7.8	18.1	3.1	5.0
2012	Melbourne	44	18	8	15	140	132	272	61	58	0.4	0.8	7.8	7.3	15.1	3.4	3.2
2013	Melbourne	44	8	4	7	51	35	86	23	18	0.5	0.9	6.4	4.4	10.8	2.9	2.3
2014	Melbourne	44	21	10	4	189	137	326	79	92	0.5	0.2	9.0	6.5	15.5	3.8	4.4
2015	Melbourne	44	6	1	3	36	30	66	18	15	0.2	0.5	6.0	5.0	11.0	3.0	2.5
Career			71	28	32	583	467	1050	246	255	0.4	0.5	8.2	6.6	14.8	3.5	3.6
