= Bernie Vince =

Australian rules footballer (born 1985)

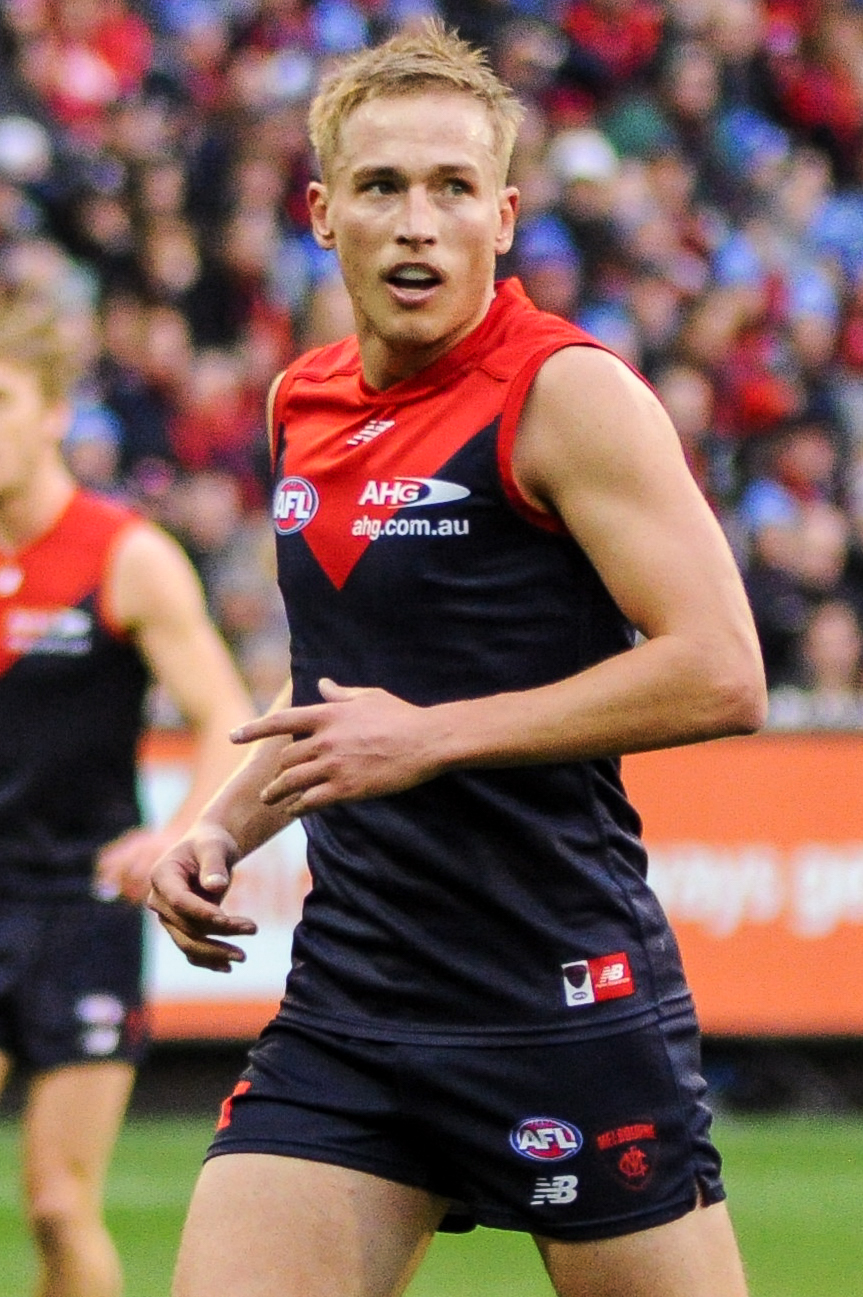
- Vince playing for Melbourne in June 2017

Personal information
- Full name: Bernard Vince
- Born: 2 October 1985 (age 41); Stansbury, South Australia
- Original team: Woodville-West Torrens (SANFL)
- Draft: No. 32, 2005 national draft
- Debut: Round 1, 2006, Adelaide vs. Collingwood, at Telstra Dome
- Height: 186 cm (6 ft 1 in)
- Weight: 86 kg (190 lb)
- Position: Midfielder

Playing career^{1}
Years	Club	Games (Goals)
2006–2013	Adelaide	129 (80)
2014–2018	Melbourne	100 (33)
Total		229 (113)

International team honours^{2}
Years	Team	Games (Goals)
2011	Australia	2 (0)
- ^{1} Playing statistics correct to the end of 2018.^{2} Representative statistics correct as of 2011.

Career highlights
- Malcolm Blight Medallist: 2009; Keith 'Bluey' Truscott Medallist: 2015; Michael Tuck Medallist: 2012; Showdown Medal: 2008

Bernard Vince (born 2 October 1985) is a former Australian rules footballer who played for the Adelaide and Melbourne Football Club in the Australian Football League (AFL). He has since become involved in the football media, working for Triple M and Fox Footy.

At the time of his retirement, Vince was only one of seven players in VFL/AFL history to have played 100 or more games at two clubs and win the best and fairest award at both clubs.

== Playing career ==
Originally from Stansbury on the Yorke Peninsula, Vince grew up on the family farm with four younger sisters and attended school at Minlaton District School until his senior years, which were spent in Adelaide at Prince Alfred College where he represented the school in the Open A Grade football and cricket teams.

Vince originally played Australian Rules football for the CMS Crows. After an unsuccessful stint in the SANFL, he returned to Stansbury, but eventually Woodville-West Torrens gave him a chance to play in the SANFL firsts—successfully played four games–including 3 finals. Vince was selected by the Adelaide Football Club in the 2005 national draft with pick 32.

Vince played all pre-season NAB Cup games in 2006, and debuted later that year—playing ten games in his first two seasons. He played six consecutive games early in 2007 before missing the rest of the season due to form and injury.

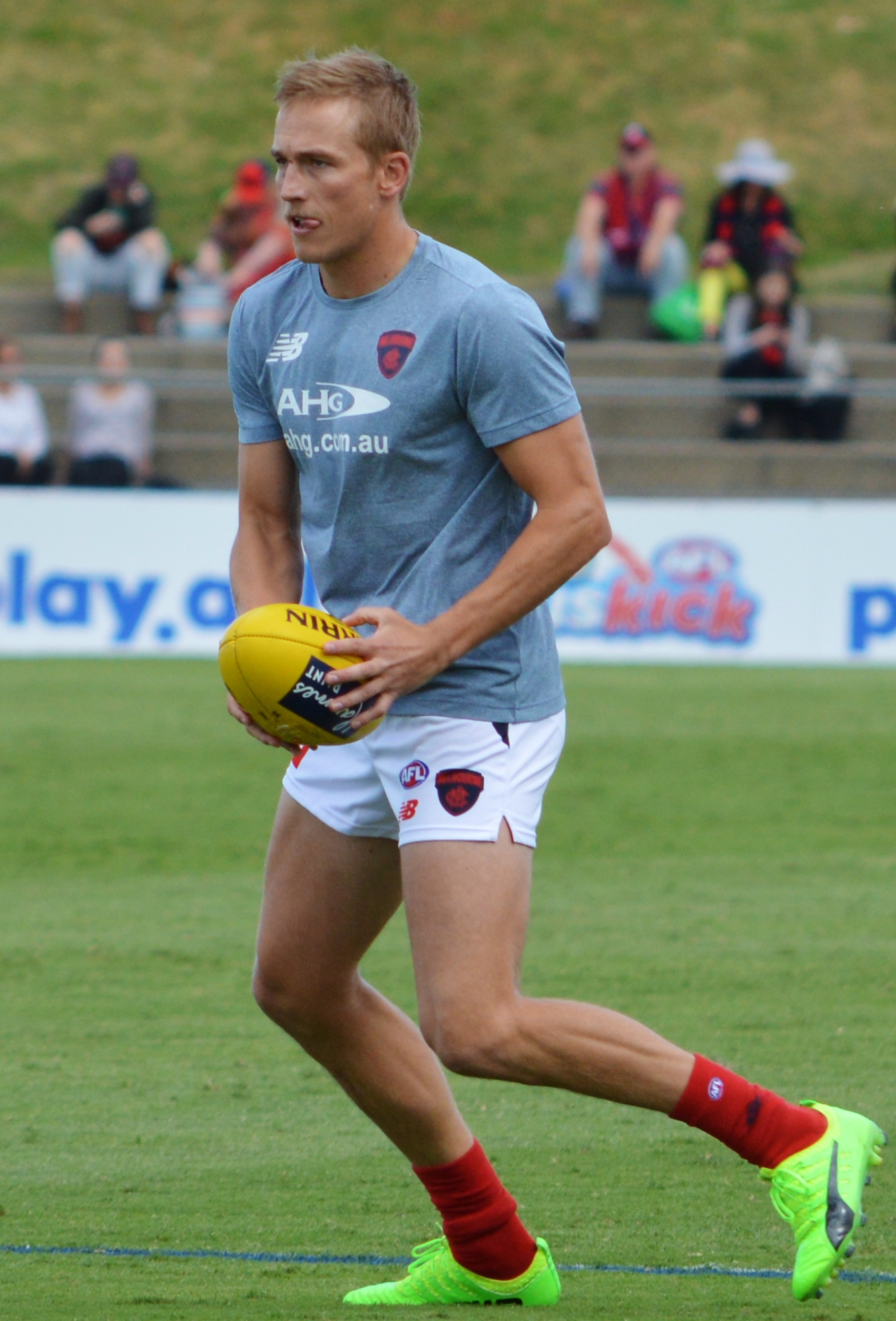
Vince warming up before a pre-season match in February 2017

2008 saw Vince become a consistent member of Adelaide's young midfield, capable of going forward as well. One such performance earned him the Showdown Medal in Showdown XXIV against rivals Port Adelaide, despite being one of several Crows to take heavy knocks in the six-point victory. In round 11 against Richmond, he exceeded 30 disposals for the first time—also kicking 3 goals—as Adelaide won by 50 points. He has continued this form in 2009, being one of the club's, and league's, leading possession-getters. Vince topped a great season by winning the Adelaide Crows Best and Fairest award in 2009.

In 2007 and 2010 Vince was suspended by Adelaide for missing curfews. Prior to the start of the 2012 AFL season, Vince was reprimanded, but not suspended, after reportedly stripping down to his underwear in a pub after celebrating his cricket team winning the championship. Vince had played for the Stansbury, South Australia for most of the season, but Adelaide coach Brenton Sanderson prevented him from playing in the final to avoid any chance of injury so close to the AFL season.

Vince was traded to the Melbourne Demons during the 2013 Trade Period.

In 2015, he won the Keith 'Bluey' Truscott Medal as Melbourne's best and fairest, polling one vote ahead of Jack Viney.

== Personal life ==
Vince married Abbie Noonan in 2017. They have one son, Harvey and two daughters, Olivia and Charlotte.

== Statistics ==
Legend
G	Goals	K	Kicks	D	Disposals	T	Tackles
B	Behinds	H	Handballs	M	Marks

Season	Team	No.	Games	Totals							Averages (per game)						
Season	Team	No.	Games	G	B	K	H	D	M	T	G	B	K	H	D	M	T
2006	Adelaide	28	4	1	1	15	13	28	10	4	0.3	0.3	3.8	3.3	7.0	2.5	1.0
2007	Adelaide	28	6	1	4	28	31	59	15	15	0.2	0.7	4.7	5.2	9.8	2.5	2.5
2008	Adelaide	17	21	15	10	217	161	378	100	50	0.7	0.5	10.3	7.7	18.0	4.8	2.4
2009	Adelaide	17	24	14	10	336	323	659	142	66	0.6	0.4	14.0	13.5	27.5	5.9	2.8
2010	Adelaide	17	16	7	1	226	154	380	78	41	0.4	0.1	14.1	9.6	23.8	4.9	2.6
2011	Adelaide	17	17	11	8	227	163	390	69	33	0.6	0.5	13.4	9.6	22.9	4.1	1.9
2012	Adelaide	17	20	18	10	293	121	414	83	34	0.9	0.5	14.7	6.1	20.7	4.2	1.7
2013	Adelaide	17	21	13	11	284	148	432	87	68	0.6	0.5	13.5	7.0	20.6	4.1	3.2
2014	Melbourne	23	22	13	14	361	170	531	100	76	0.6	0.6	16.4	7.7	24.1	4.5	3.5
2015	Melbourne	23	21	11	6	307	212	519	57	101	0.5	0.3	14.6	10.1	24.7	2.7	4.8
2016	Melbourne	23	21	6	10	357	177	534	81	65	0.3	0.5	17.0	8.4	25.4	3.9	3.1
2017	Melbourne	23	19	2	4	263	140	403	73	55	0.1	0.2	13.8	7.4	21.2	3.8	2.9
2018	Melbourne	23	17	1	1	172	101	273	43	42	0.1	0.1	10.1	5.9	16.1	2.5	2.5
Career			229	113	90	3086	1914	5000	938	650	0.5	0.4	13.5	8.4	21.9	4.1	2.8

== Honours and achievements ==
Team

- NAB Cup (Adelaide): 2012

Individual

- Michael Tuck Medal: 2012
- Keith 'Bluey' Truscott Trophy: 2015
- Malcolm Blight Medal: 2009
- Showdown Medal: 2008 (Round 3)
- Australia international rules football team: 2011
