= Lynden Dunn =

Australian rules footballer

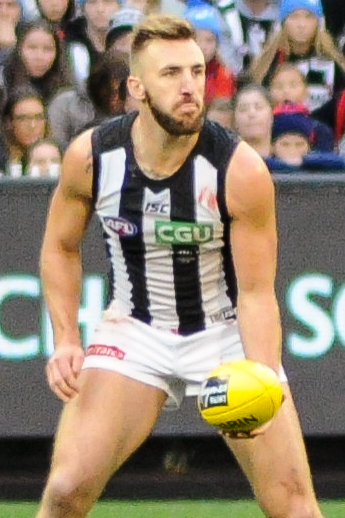
- Dunn playing for Collingwood in June 2017

Personal information
- Full name: Lynden Dunn
- Born: 14 May 1987 (age 39)
- Original team: Calder Cannons (TAC Cup)
- Draft: No. 15, 2004 national draft
- Debut: Round 6, 2006, Melbourne vs. Geelong, at MCG
- Height: 192 cm (6 ft 4 in)
- Weight: 99 kg (218 lb)
- Position: Defender

Playing career
Years	Club	Games (Goals)
2005–2016	Melbourne	165 (97)
2017–2020	Collingwood	33 (2)
Total		198 (99)

Lynden Dunn (born 14 May 1987) is a retired professional Australian rules footballer who played in the Australian Football League (AFL) for Melbourne from 2005 to 2016 and for Collingwood from 2017 to 2020. He kicked 99 goals in 198 games.

== Career ==
Dunn was selected as Melbourne's second pick and 15th overall in the 2004 AFL draft. 2005 was a learning year for Dunn who developed well with Melbourne's VFL affiliate team, Sandringham.

The young forward made significant progress in 2006, increasing his body size, and worked hard to break into the senior lineup for his debut in round 6, a tightly fought victory over the Cats. Dunn played eleven games at senior level, kicking 13 goals and showed promising signs that he will be a player of the future for the Demons.

He worked hard on his body over the pre-season and after suffering a fractured cheekbone in the VFL, Dunn was able to return to the senior team in round 4, 2007, kicking three goals in a heavy loss to the Dockers. He played 12 games that season.

Dunn was embroiled in controversy in 2008 when he was reported twice within a minute for striking Brent Harvey - incidents for which he escaped from the tribunal with merely a reprimand.

In 2010 Dunn had switched from playing as a tagger to a defensive-forward and had kicked his most goals in a single season, including a career best five goals against Richmond at the MCG in round 19.

As of the end of the 2017 season, Dunn has played the most games of any current AFL player without playing in a final. He was traded to Collingwood during the 2016 trade period.

In August 2017, Dunn joined Collingwood's Women's coaching team as an assistant coach.

In October 2019, Dunn was delisted by Collingwood, with the club leaving the option of them considering him in the rookie draft if he is still without a club. In March 2020, Collingwood used their final list spot to sign Dunn on a one-year rookie deal.

In 2020, Dunn was handed a four match suspension for breaching the AFL's COVID-19 protocols, after he and teammate Steele Sidebottom had shared an Uber together and visited several homes.

In October 2020, Dunn retired from football, after kicking 99 goals in 198 games.

== Statistics ==
Statistics are correct to the end of the 2020 season

Legend
G	Goals	K	Kicks	D	Disposals	T	Tackles
B	Behinds	H	Handballs	M	Marks

Season	Team	No.	Games	Totals							Averages (per game)						
Season	Team	No.	Games	G	B	K	H	D	M	T	G	B	K	H	D	M	T
2005	Melbourne	14	0	—	—	—	—	—	—	—	—	—	—	—	—	—	—
2006	Melbourne	14	11	13	10	70	33	103	42	13	1.2	0.9	6.4	3	9.4	3.8	1.2
2007	Melbourne	14	12	9	7	87	68	155	41	38	0.8	0.6	7.3	5.7	12.9	3.4	3.2
2008	Melbourne	14	16	6	6	101	89	190	59	53	0.4	0.4	6.3	5.6	11.9	3.7	3.3
2009	Melbourne	14	13	8	1	120	90	210	59	42	0.6	0.1	9.2	6.9	16.2	4.5	3.2
2010	Melbourne	14	18	26	22	195	70	265	107	50	1.4	1.2	10.8	3.9	14.7	5.9	2.8
2011	Melbourne	14	11	16	10	86	37	123	50	31	1.5	0.9	7.8	3.4	11.2	4.5	2.8
2012	Melbourne	14	18	9	6	164	82	246	69	46	0.5	0.3	9.1	4.6	13.7	3.8	2.6
2013	Melbourne	14	18	4	2	195	93	288	67	59	0.2	0.1	10.8	5.2	16.0	3.7	3.3
2014	Melbourne	14	22	4	8	273	114	387	125	26	0.2	0.4	12.4	5.2	17.6	5.7	1.2
2015	Melbourne	14	22	1	2	242	120	362	99	55	0.0	0.1	11.0	5.5	16.5	4.5	2.5
2016	Melbourne	14	4	1	0	42	13	55	15	10	0.3	0.0	10.5	3.3	13.8	3.8	2.5
2017	Collingwood	15	17	1	1	162	68	230	88	23	0.1	0.1	9.5	4.0	13.5	5.2	1.4
2018	Collingwood	15	14	0	0	119	60	179	57	28	0.0	0.0	8.5	4.3	12.8	4.1	2.0
2019	Collingwood	15	0	—	—	—	—	—	—	—	—	—	—	—	—	—	—
2020	Collingwood	15	2	1	0	12	6	18	5	3	0.5	0.0	6.0	3.0	9.0	2.5	1.5
Career			198	99	75	1868	943	2811	883	477	0.5	0.4	9.4	4.8	14.2	4.5	2.4
