= Chris Dawes (Australian footballer) =

Australian rules footballer

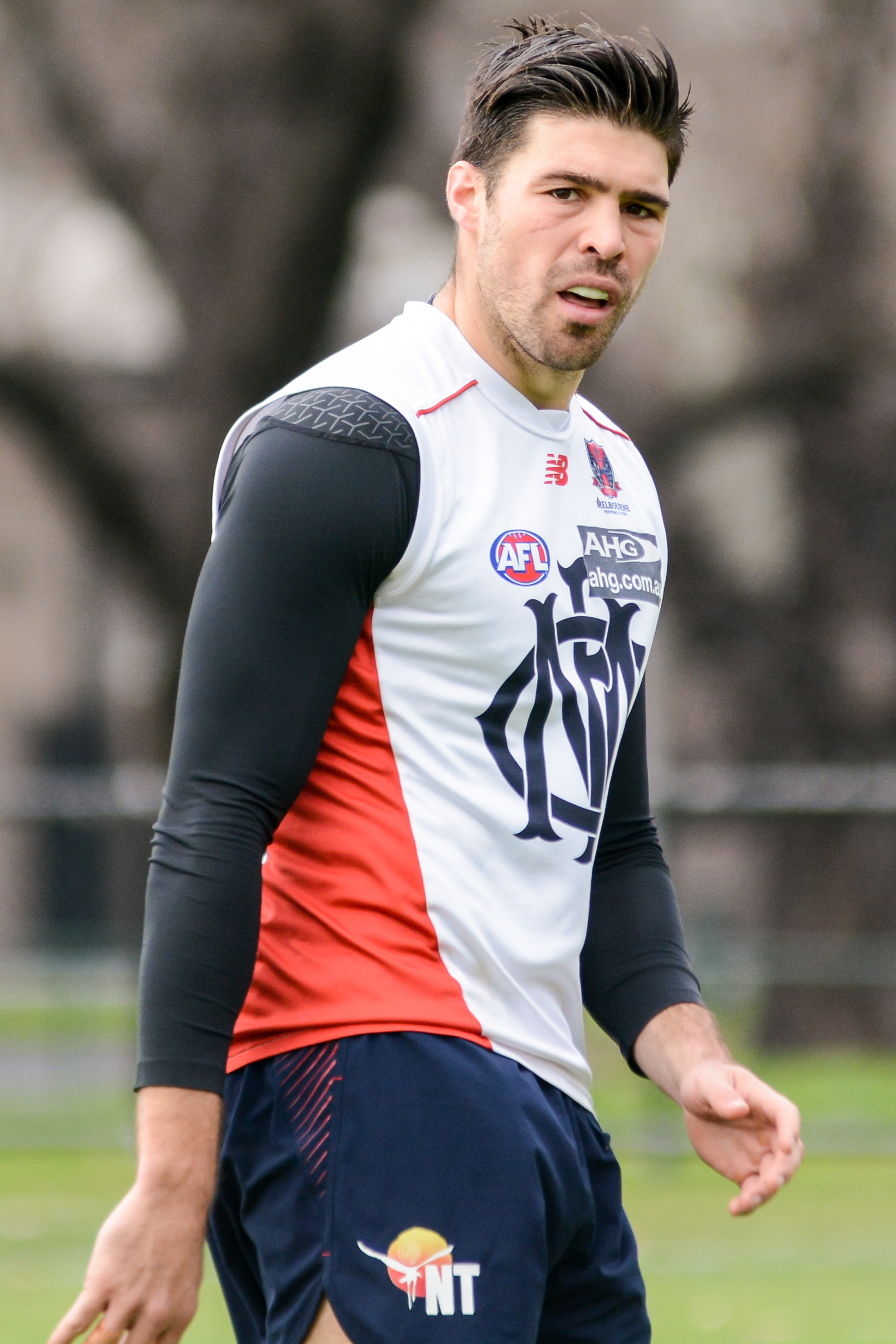
- Dawes at training in July 2015

Personal information
- Full name: Chris Dawes
- Born: 16 May 1988 (age 38); Victoria
- Original team: Hampton Rovers (VAFA) / Sandringham Dragons (TAC Cup)
- Draft: No. 28, 2006 National Draft
- Debut: Round 19, 2008, Collingwood vs. St Kilda, at MCG
- Height: 193 cm (6 ft 4 in)
- Weight: 101 kg (223 lb)
- Position: Forward

Playing career^{1}
Years	Club	Games (Goals)
2008–2012	Collingwood	71 (83)
2013–2016	Melbourne	50 (47)
Total		121 (130)
- ^{1} Playing statistics correct to the end of 2016.

Career highlights
- Collingwood Premiership player 2010; Melbourne leading Goalkicker 2014

Chris Dawes (born 16 May 1988) is a former professional Australian rules footballer who played for the Collingwood Football Club and Melbourne Football Club in the Australian Football League (AFL).

== Early career ==
Raised in the bayside suburbs, Dawes attended Brighton Grammar and played junior football at the Hampton Rovers Football Club. He is the son of a history lecturer turned antiquarian bookshop owner and is studying law at Victoria University in Melbourne (but with only passing interest in practising it).

== AFL career ==
Dawes was drafted by Collingwood with the 28th selection in the 2006 AFL draft from Sandringham Dragons in the TAC Cup, having attended Brighton Grammar School. He is a strongly built forward who missed the majority of 2007 due to a knee injury after playing well for the Magpies' then VFL-affiliate, Williamstown.

Dawes' first game was a win against the in-form St Kilda in round 19, 2008. He joined the list of players who have kicked a goal with their first kick in league football. He was selected to play in the first game after the club imposed suspensions on Alan Didak and Heath Shaw.

After making his debut, Dawes played the remainder of Collingwood's 2008 season including an elimination final against the Adelaide Crows in which he kicked three goals.

After strong performances in the VFL, Dawes was selected for the Anzac Day clash against Essendon in round 5. He played in all but two matches for the rest of the year, including both the drawn and replayed Grand Finals against St Kilda. In the Grand Final replay, Dawes kicked two goals in Collingwood's 56 point win. Dawes finished the season with a total of 30 goals from 20 games.

Dawes started the 2011 season well, kicking 21 goals from his first 13 games, before missing seven games from a broken knuckle. He struggled to regain his form when he returned late in the season, only kicking six goals from the last five games.

In 2012, Dawes struggled to have a major impact, only kicking 16 goals from 23 games. His position as the backup ruckman and second tall forward was questioned going into the finals series, but he held his position in the team. At the end of the season, Dawes requested that he be traded to another club, and Collingwood agreed to a deal with Melbourne during trade week.

At the conclusion of the 2016 season, he was delisted by Melbourne.

== Post AFL ==
Dawes signed for Sorrento in the Mornington Peninsula Nepean Football League for the 2017 season. He went on to kick 81 Goals in 24 matches for Sorrento.

== Statistics ==
Statistics are correct to the end of the 2016 season

Legend
G	Goals	K	Kicks	D	Disposals	T	Tackles
B	Behinds	H	Handballs	M	Marks

Season	Team	No.	Games	Totals							Averages (per game)						
Season	Team	No.	Games	G	B	K	H	D	M	T	G	B	K	H	D	M	T
2008	Collingwood	31	6	5	3	35	16	51	29	5	0.8	0.5	5.8	2.7	8.5	8.5	0.8
2009	Collingwood	31	4	5	3	20	33	53	18	10	1.3	0.6	5.0	6.6	11.6	4.5	2.5
2010	Collingwood	31	20	30	16	136	111	247	111	51	1.5	1.3	6.8	5.6	12.4	5.6	2.6
2011	Collingwood	31	18	27	15	122	121	243	81	58	1.5	0.9	6.8	6.8	13.6	4.5	3.2
2012	Collingwood	31	23	16	20	158	134	292	110	59	0.7	0.9	6.9	5.8	12.7	4.8	2.7
2013	Melbourne	6	12	12	6	82	28	110	63	22	1.0	0.5	6.8	2.3	9.1	5.3	1.8
2014	Melbourne	6	18	20	15	136	86	222	81	54	1.1	0.8	7.6	4.8	12.3	4.5	3.0
2015	Melbourne	6	14	11	12	100	67	167	60	21	0.8	0.9	7.1	4.8	11.9	4.3	1.5
2016	Melbourne	6	6	4	2	36	36	72	17	19	0.7	0.3	6.0	6.0	12.0	2.8	3.2
Career			121	130	92	825	632	1457	570	299	1.1	0.8	6.8	5.2	12.0	4.7	2.5
