= 2013 Melbourne Football Club season =

Melbourne Football Club
2013 season
- President: Don McLardy^{(to 14 June)} Peter Spargo^{(interim)} Glen Bartlett^{(from 16 August)}
- Coach: Mark Neeld^{(2nd season)}^{(rounds 1–12)} Neil Craig^{(rounds 13–23)}
- Captains: Jack Grimes^{(2nd season)} Jack Trengove^{(2nd season)}
- Home grounds: MCG^{(100,018 capacity)}
- Pre-season: 14th
- AFL season: 17th
- Finals series: DNQ
- Best and fairest: Nathan Jones
- Leading goalkicker: Jeremy Howe^{(28 goals)}
- Highest home attendance: 50,835^{(round 11 vs. Collingwood)}
- Lowest home attendance: 7,615^{(round 17 vs. Brisbane Lions)}
- Average home attendance: 24,974
- Club membership: 33,117^{(▼2,228 / ▼6.30%)}

The 2013 Melbourne Football Club season was the club's 114th year in the VFL/AFL since it began in 1897.

Mark Neeld entered into his second year as senior coach of Melbourne. After a horrid season in 2012, Neeld made a vast amount of list changes in the 2012 AFL draft. These changes included the addition of experienced and key position players from other clubs such as Shannon Byrnes, Tom Gillies, Chris Dawes, David Rodan and Cameron Pedersen. Melbourne also added five new players from the National Draft, two new players from the Rookie Draft as well as one new player from the Greater Western Sydney Mini-Draft who will play in 2014. Jack Grimes and Jack Trengove continued their roles as co-captains of the football club.

With no Friday night games and only three home games against fellow Victorian sides at the MCG, Melbourne faced a financially challenging fixture. At the same time Melbourne received a simple fixture when compared to other teams by playing fellow-cellar dwellers in 2012 Greater Western Sydney, Gold Coast and Western Bulldogs twice and all 2012 finalists with the exception of Fremantle once. Melbourne hosted nine home games at the MCG, a sold home game against Brisbane Lions at TIO Stadium in Round 17 and a home game against North Melbourne at Etihad Stadium in Round 18.

Melbourne endured one of their worst seasons in the club's 155-year history and arguably their worst in the modern era. They finished with only 2 wins (their least since the 1981 season) and a percentage of 54.07% (their worst since the 1919 season). It was also the worst seasonal performance from an established club since the demise of Fitzroy in 1996.

== 2013 list changes ==
=== 2012 free agency ===
Player	Date	Free agent type	Former club	New club	Compensation	Ref
Shannon Byrnes	4 October 2012	Unrestricted	Geelong	Melbourne	None	
Brent Moloney	12 October 2012	Restricted	Melbourne	Brisbane Lions	3rd round	
Jared Rivers	18 October 2012	Unrestricted	Melbourne	Geelong	3rd round	
Tom Gillies	13 November 2012	Delisted	Geelong	Melbourne	None	

=== 2012 trades ===
Trade gained	Traded from	Trade lost
Dominic Barry; Pick 2 (mini-draft); Pick 20	Greater Western Sydney	Pick 3 Pick 13
Chris Dawes; Pick 58	Collingwood	Pick 20; Pick 45
David Rodan	Port Adelaide	Pick 88
Pick 88	West Coast	Cale Morton
Cameron Pedersen; Pick 74	North Melbourne	Jordan Gysberts; Pick 63
Pick 53; Pick 73	Brisbane Lions	Stefan Martin

=== Retirements and delistings ===
Player	New club	League	Reason	Ref
Brad Green	Carlton – assistant coach	AFL	Retired	
Liam Jurrah	South Alice Springs	CAFL	Resigned	
Ricky Petterd	Richmond	AFL	Delisted	
Matthew Bate	Essendon reserves	VFL	Delisted	
Jamie Bennell	West Coast	AFL	Delisted	
Lucas Cook	North Ballarat	VFL	Delisted	
Jai Sheahan	Geelong reserves	VFL	Delisted	
Leigh Williams	Williamstown	VFL	Delisted	
Kelvin Lawrence	Peel Thunder	WAFL	Delisted	

=== Mini-draft ===
Overall pick	Player	State	Position	Team from	League from
2	Jesse Hogan	(Western Australia)	Forward	Claremont Football Club	WAFL

=== National draft ===
Round	Overall pick	Player	State	Position	Team from	League from
1	4	Jimmy Toumpas	(South Australia)	Midfield	Woodville-West Torrens	SANFL
2	26 (F/S)	Jack Viney	(Victoria (state))	Midfield	Oakleigh Chargers	TAC Cup
3	48	Dean Kent	(Western Australia)	Forward/Midfield	Perth	WAFL
3	52	Matt Jones	(Victoria (state))	Midfield	Box Hill Hawks	VFL
4	68	Dean Terlich	(South Australia)	Defender	Norwood	SANFL
4	71 (RP)	Daniel Nicholson	(Victoria (state))	Midfield/Defender	Melbourne	AFL
4	72 (RP)	Michael Evans	(Victoria (state))	Midfield	Melbourne	AFL

=== Rookie draft ===
Round	Overall pick	Player	State	Position	Team from	League from
1	3	Nathan Stark	(South Australia)	Midfield	Glenelg	SANFL
2	19	Mitch Clisby	(South Australia)	Midfield/Defender	North Adelaide	SANFL

== 2013 squad ==
Melbourne Football Club
Senior list		Rookie list	Coaching staff
2 Nathan Jones (vc); 4 Jack Watts; 5 Jimmy Toumpas; 6 Chris Dawes; 7 Jack Viney; 8 James Frawley; 9 Jack Trengove (c); 10 Shannon Byrnes; 11 Mitch Clark; 12 Colin Sylvia; 13 Jordie McKenzie; 14 Lynden Dunn; 15 David Rodan; 17 Sam Blease; 19 James Strauss; 20 Colin Garland; 21 Cameron Pedersen; 23 Josh Tynan; 25 Tom McDonald; 26 Daniel Nicholson	27 Tom Gillies; 28 Joel Macdonald; 30 James Sellar; 31 Jack Grimes (c); 32 Michael Evans; 33 Dominic Barry; 34 Dean Kent; 35 Luke Tapscott; 36 Aaron Davey; 37 Max Gawn; 38 Jeremy Howe; 39 Neville Jetta; 40 Mark Jamar; 41 Troy Davis; 42 Jake Spencer; 43 Rory Taggert; 44 Rohan Bail; 45 Matt Jones; 46 Dean Terlich; 48 Jack Fitzpatrick	22 James Magner; 47 Tom Couch; 49 Nathan Stark; 50 Mitch Clisby	Head coach: Mark Neeld; Assistant coaches: Neil Craig (director of coaching); Todd Viney (general manager); Leigh Brown (forward line); Brian Royal (midfield); Jade Rawlings (backline); David Misson (fitness); Legend: (c) Captain(s); (vc) Vice-captain(s); Long-term injury list; Upgraded rookie(s); (vet) Veterans list

== 2013 season ==
=== Pre-season ===
==== NAB Cup ====
===== Week 1 =====
	Round 1
Friday, 22 February (6:45 pm)	North Melbourne 1.4.5 (38)	def.	Melbourne 0.5.6 (36)	Etihad Stadium	Report
Friday, 22 February (7:50 pm)	Melbourne 0.2.3 (15)	def. by	Richmond 1.2.9 (30)	Etihad Stadium	Report
The first game saw Melbourne get off to an early start when Nathan Jones delivered a strong pass to Jack Watts who kicked the first goal for Melbourne's 2013 pre-season campaign. However North Melbourne would run Melbourne rampant down the midfield with Majak Daw showing outstanding set plays as the Kangaroos would take out an 18-point lead midway through the second half. However a couple of strong marks and goals from Jeremy Howe saw Melbourne back in the contest. With Melbourne 8 points down and 15 seconds to go, Dean Kent would find himself 45 metres out. With no-one to handball outside of Melbourne's 50 to take a shot for 9 points, Dean Kent would be forced to kick after the siren for a shot at scoring 6 points. Although he successfully converted, Melbourne would still end up falling short by 2 points.; The second game saw a fresh Richmond outfit dominate Melbourne's tiring midfield early in the first half at one point scoring 16 inside 50s to 4. Melbourne had bursted out a short stint of energy late in the first half and early in the second half that saw Jack Watts and Jimmy Toumpas. However Richmond would continue to assert their dominance in the midfield stoppages eventually thrashing Melbourne in the clearances 18–5 as well as the inside 50 count 26–12. Richmond's inaccuracy in-front of goal as well as a handful of strong contested marks from Jack Watts at half-back ensured that the margin was only 15 points at the end of the game.

===== Week 2 =====
Round 2
Sunday, 3 March (4:00 pm)	Port Adelaide	def. by	Melbourne	Renmark, South Australia (crowd: 3,764)
0.2.3 (15); 0.5.3 (33); 0.8.4 (52); 1.10.7 (76)	Q1; Q2; Q3; Final	0.4.2 (26); 0.8.5 (53); 0.9.6 (60); 0.12.6 (78)	Television broadcast: none
Hartlett	Super Goals
D. Stewart 3, Hartlett 2, Young, Wingard, Newton, Neade, Colquhorn	Goals	Sellar 5, Davey 3, Kent 2, Evans, Tapscott
Hartlett, Wines, Mitchell, Colquhorn, Redden, Stevenson	Best	Magner, Sellar, Jetta, Tapscott, Evans, Sylvia
Both sides entered the match with most of their best players having a game off to allow for less experienced players to step in.; Melbourne took an early assault over Port Adelaide thanks to James Sellar who was acting as the primary forward that day with Mitch Clark, Jeremy Howe and Chris Dawes.; Melbourne had an impressive first half to lead Port Adelaide by 20 points. However Port would create a surge in the third quarter to get within a goal's kick.; Melbourne would re-extend the margin late in the third and early in the fourth quarter. This was followed by a second surge by Port Adelaide getting within a goal's margin again. However Melbourne would manage to hold their nerve towards the end of the game and win by 2 points. James Sellar was the best on ground with 5 goals.

===== Week 3 =====
Round 3
Saturday, 9 March (2:30 pm)	Melbourne	def. by	St Kilda	Casey Fields (crowd: 5000 est)
1.2.2 (23); 1.3.4 (31); 2.5.6 (54); 2.7.6 (66)	Q1; Q2; Q3; Final	0.1.2 (8); 2.6.8 (62); 2.8.8 (74); 2.10.13 (91)	Television broadcast: none
Dunn, N. Jones	Super Goals	Newnes, Dal Santo
Sellar 2, Byrnes, Tapscott, Davey, Hogan, Toumpas	Goals	Milne 3, Milera 2, Hayes, Dennis-Lane, Riewoldt, Gilbert, Dal Santo
N. Jones, Rodan, Dunn, Terlich, Jamar, Sylvia, Nicholson	Best	Dal Santo, Newnes, Montagna, Milne, Steven, Geary, Roberton
Injuries	Dempster (tightness)
On a hot, sweltering day with strong northerly winds, Melbourne would win the toss and kick with the breeze. They started the game off strongly with 3 goals (including a super goal) and looked to run over the top despite being advantaged with the breeze.; St Kilda however were able to utilize the breeze to their full advantage by kicking 7 goals (including 2 supergoals) whilst at the same time run the Melbourne's young team of midfielders off their feet in the heat.; Melbourne were eventually able to fend off steady St Kilda's momentum surge in the second half. However they were unable to properly capitalize of any momentum surge of their own and eventually went down by 25 points.

==== NAB Challenge ====
===== Week 4 =====
Week 4
Saturday, 16 March (11:30 am)	Gold Coast	def.	Melbourne	Fankhauser Reserve
1.0 (6); 4.5 (29); 9.6 (60); 12.7 (79)	Q1; Q2; Q3; Final	2.3 (15); 4.3 (27); 5.5 (35); 8.7 (55)	Television broadcast: none
Hall 3, Ablett 2, Dixon 2, Harbrow, Lonergan, Smith, Gorringe, Hutchins	Goals	Sellar 3, Terlich, Jamar, Pedersen, M. Jones, Hogan
Ablett, Hall, Hutchins, Dixon, Prestia, Thompson	Best	Watts, Grimes, Jamar, Terlich, Sellar
Lonergan (wrist)	Injuries

=== Home and away season ===
==== Overview ====
The 2013 season for Melbourne turned out to be disastrous to such an extraordinary magnitude that they required a complete refurbishment of their board and football department. Melbourne began the season as marginal favourites at home against fellow cellar dwellers Port Adelaide. However they displayed such visible problems with their ball use, work rate and turnover rate in the midfield that they were eventually shut out of the game and hammered by 79 points. After a week of media scrutiny over their Round 1 performance, Melbourne was expected to put in place a more spirited performance against Essendon. For the opening proportion of that game, they appeared to have lifted their intensity. However, after Essendon scored consecutive goals, Melbourne's problems from Round 1 occurred again and they were eventually slaughtered by 148 points. This was their greatest losing margin at the MCG in their entire VFL/AFL history. Fan backlash resulted from this enormous loss and the next week on 9 April, Melbourne made the decision to sack their CEO Cameron Schwab.

After a week of team bonding in Sorrento, Melbourne appeared to have turned around their form in Round 3 against West Coast, only trailing by 10 points at half time. However, by the time West Coast kicked consecutive goals in the second half, Melbourne would again shut down and eventually get hammered by 94 points. With an average losing margin of 108 points in the first 3 rounds, Melbourne headed into their Round 4 clash against recent expansion team Greater Western Sydney at the MCG, in what was a must win game for Mark Neeld so that he may have maintained his coaching role. In a game of sub-standard football from both sides, Melbourne looked to be set to lose at 3 quarter time trailing by 19 points however managed to blow the game away with their highest ever quarter score in VFL/AFL history of 12 goals and 2 behinds to win by 41 points. In subsequent rounds Melbourne's form didn't show any improvement from Round 4 however as the pressure for Mark Neeld to keep his job oscillated out of control. They got thrashed by 60+ points against Carlton in Round 6, Gold Coast in Round 7, Fremantle in Round 9, Hawthorn in Round 10 and Collingwood in Round 11.

During Melbourne's bye, 2 major personnel changes would occur to the club. On 13 June, Melbourne president Don McLardy resigned and was replaced by vice-president Peter Spargo as an interim-president. 3 days later after weeks of pressure Mark Neeld was finally sacked from his senior coaching position and replaced by former Adelaide senior coach Neil Craig. Craig's first game coaching Melbourne was against fellow cellar dwellers St Kilda. Despite Melbourne controlling more possession of the ball with more inside 50s, they still lost by 35 points due to their lack of forward pressure. Melbourne however finally broke through for only their second win of the season against Western Bulldogs by 3 points. This came after Melbourne nearly conceded a 44-point lead midway through the final quarter by allowing the Western Bulldogs to kick the last 7 goals of the game.

After a gutsy performance against the 2012 premiers Sydney where Melbourne went down by 31 points, they would finish their miserable season by falling back into the shut-down habits they experienced at the start of the season. This included a 68-point loss to Geelong in Round 16, a 122-point loss to North Melbourne in Round 18, a 37-point loss to bottom of the ladder Greater Western Sydney in Round 19, a 95-point loss to Fremantle in Round 21 and a 68-point loss to Adelaide in Round 22. Melbourne would finish the season with a woeful 2 wins and 54.07%.

==== Round 1 ====
Round 1
Sunday, 31 March (1:10 pm)	Melbourne	def. by	Port Adelaide	MCG (crowd: 22,924)
3.1 (19); 7.2 (44); 7.3 (45); 8.6 (54)	Q1; Q2; Q3; Final	5.3 (33); 11.7 (73); 16.13 (109); 19.19 (133)	Television broadcast: Fox Footy
Clark 2, Howe 2, Byrnes, McKenzie, Pedersen, Viney	Goals	Schultz 4, Monfries 3, P. Stewart 3, Hartlett 2, Cornes, Heath, Moore, Pittard, Westhoff, Wingard, Wines
Viney, McKenzie, Grimes, M. Jones	Best	Hartlett, Cornes, Schultz, P. Stewart, Ebert, Boak, Monfries, Pittard, Trengove, Wines
Clark (ankle)	Injuries
This game saw 7 new faces make their Melbourne Football Club debut. This included David Rodan from Port Adelaide, Tom Gillies and Shannon Byrnes from Geelong as well as Cameron Pedersen from North Melbourne.; From the start of the game, Port Adelaide were able to dictate play in the centre clearance and were easily able to find loose men throughout the ground to move the ball forwards with.; Despite 2 short periods where Melbourne were able to dictate play in the first and second quarters, they were unable to move the ball forward as they would consistently kick to pack contests around the boundary line and continue to turn the ball over in the midfield. From there Port Adelaide were able to move the ball into the middle of the ground and spread their players around the ground to move the ball forward without any real defensive pressure applied.; Despite a dark day for the Melbourne Football Club, both Jack Viney and Matt Jones were impressive in the midfield and were both able to gain 22 possessions each on debut.; Debut(s): Jimmy Toumpas, Jack Viney, Matt Jones; Debut(s) for MFC: Shannon Byrnes (Geelong), Tom Gillies (Geelong), Cameron Pedersen (North Melbourne), David Rodan (Richmond/Port Adelaide); Milestone(s): Lynden Dunn (100th AFL game), Jack Viney (1st AFL goal); Brownlow Votes: Brad Ebert (Port Adelaide) 3 votes, Hamish Hartlett (Port Adelaide) 2 votes, Kane Cornes (Port Adelaide) 1 vote Record: 0 Wins, 1 Loss, 0 Draws; Ladder Position: 18th Substitutes: Sam Blease ▲ Mitch Clark ▼

==== Round 2 ====
Round 2
Saturday, 6 April (7:40 pm)	Essendon	def.	Melbourne	MCG (crowd: 51,153)
6.2 (38); 13.6 (84); 21.11 (137); 28.16 (184)	Q1; Q2; Q3; Final	2.1 (13); 4.5 (29); 5.5 (35); 5.6 (36)	Television broadcast: Seven Network
Crameri 6, Bellchambers 4, Watson 3, Davey 2, Heppell 2, Howlett 2, Merrett 2, Hurley 2, Stanton 2, Goddard, Ryder, Dempsey	Goals	Davey 2, Grimes, Clark, N. Jones
Heppell, Watson, Bellchambers, Crameri, Goddard, Stanton, Fletcher, Howlett, Zaharakis	Best	Howe, Frawley, N. Jones, Garland
Before the game, Essendon celebrated the 20-year anniversary of full back Dustin Fletcher's debut.; For the first 10 minutes of the game, Melbourne played a competitive brand of football keeping the goals locked at one a piece by creating spoilages and playing a hard brand of football at the stoppages.; Once Essendon kicked their second goal of the game, they took control of the game and annihilated Melbourne with their ability to spread through the corridor and break off their man with ease.; A rare highlight for Melbourne fans was Aaron Davey's goal of the year contender late in the second quarter. He managed to get possession of the ball from the boundary-line in a pressured situation and dribble it through from there.; Melbourne's 148-point loss was their worst at the MCG and against Essendon in VFL/AFL history. It was also their third ever worst loss in VFL/AFL history.; After the game Melbourne's percentage slumped to a staggeringly low 28.39%.; Debut(s): Dean Terlich; Brownlow Votes: Dyson Heppell (Essendon) 3 votes, Jobe Watson (Essendon) 2 votes, Brent Stanton (Essendon) 1 vote Record: 0 Wins, 2 Losses, 0 Draws; Ladder Position: 18th Substitutes: David Rodan ▲ Jack Watts ▼

==== Round 3 ====
Round 3
Saturday, 13 April (2:10 pm)	Melbourne	def. by	West Coast	MCG (crowd: 18,571)
4.1.25; 9.2.56; 10.3.63; 13.5.83	Q1; Q2; Q3; Final	5.3.33; 10.6.66; 21.9.135; 27.15.177	Television broadcast: Fox Footy
Clark 3, Sylvia 2, Trengove 2, Byrnes, Davey, Evans, Howe, Sellar, Tapscott	Goals	Kennedy 5, Darling 5, Hams 3, LeCras 3, Cox 3, Sinclair 2, Embley, Masten, Hill, Hurn, Gaff, Cripps
N. Jones, M. Jones, Grimes, Sylvia	Best	Kennedy, Cox, Darling, Priddis, Masten, Hurn, Shuey, S. Selwood
Rohan Bail (concussion)	Injuries	Beau Waters (calf, replaced in selected by Jacob Brennan), Ashton Hams (lower leg)
After a record loss against Essendon a week earlier the Demons, and coach Mark Neeld had been under the media spotlight all week. The demons took a surprise lead in the second quarter, and were just 10 points down at half time before the Eagles took over and ran riot with 11 goals to one in the third.; The pace slowed in the last quarter, but the Eagles still almost racked up a triple digit win - and their largest ever win over the Demons at the MCG.; Rohan Bail was temporarily substitutes replaced by Jimmy Toumpas in the second quarter while he was assessed for a possible concussion. He returned in the third quarter and played out the rest of the game, Toumpas eventually replaced Aaron Davey at the start of the last term.; Milestone(s): Michael Evans (1st AFL goal); Brownlow Votes: Chris Masten (West Coast) 3 votes, Matt Priddis (West Coast) 2 votes, Josh Kennedy (West Coast) 1 vote Record: 0 Wins, 3 Losses, 0 Draws; Ladder Position: 18th Substitutes: Jimmy Toumpas ▲ Aaron Davey ▼

==== Round 4 ====
Round 4
Sunday, 21 April (1:10 pm)	Melbourne	def.	Greater Western Sydney	MCG (crowd: 20,018)
4.5.29; 7.7.49; 10.10.70; 22.12.144	Q1; Q2; Q3; Final	3.3.21; 8.8.56; 13.11.89; 15.13.103	Television broadcast: Fox Footy
Howe 4, Byrnes 3, Evans 3, Pedersen 2, Gawn 2, Sylvia, Bail, N. Jones, Trengove, Clark, Jamar	Goals	O'hAilpin 5, Palmer 2, Cameron, Treloar, Shiel, Giles, Ward, Scully, Sumner, Greene
N. Jones, Gawn, Grimes, Howe, Garland, Evans, Terlich, Trengove	Best	Scully, Shiel, Treloar, Whitfield, O'hAilpin, Greene, Ward
Neville Jetta reported for engaging in rough conduct on Lachie Whitfield	Reports
After three disappointing losses to start the season the Demons, and Mark Neeld were under heavy scrutiny from the media with some speculation that if the Demons lost to a team who had only won two games the previous year that Neeld would be dismissed as coach.; The two sides traded blows for the first three quarters, before the Giants skipped away to a three goal lead at three quarter time. With dark clouds hovering above the Demons responded by registering their greatest ever quarter in a match - with 12.2 more than doubling their score in the last half an hour.; Michael Evans and Jeremy Howe were the driving forces of the comeback with seven goals between them, but Melbourne were flawless in beating up the young Giants in the final term despite losing Mitch Clark to a foot injury.; Aaron Davey replaced Jack Viney in the third quarter. Neville Jetta was reported for rough conduct and suspended for two matches.; Brownlow Votes: Nathan Jones 3 votes (Melbourne), Shannon Byrnes 2 votes (Melbourne), Tom Scully 1 vote (Greater Western Sydney); Record: 1 Win, 3 Losses, 0 Draws; Ladder Position: 17th Substitutes: Aaron Davey ▲ Jack Viney ▼

==== Round 5 ====
Round 5
Sunday, 28 April (3:15 pm)	Brisbane Lions	def.	Melbourne	Gabba (crowd: 19,018)
5.3.33; 7.11.53; 13.14.92; 17.20.122	Q1; Q2; Q3; Final	5.3.33; 7.5.47; 10.7.67; 14.10.94	Television broadcast: Seven Network
Brown 3, Leuenberger 3, Zorko 3, Cornelius 2, Polkinghorne, Adcock, Redden, Paparone, Bewick, Rockliff	Goals	Howe 2, Gawn 2, Bail, N. Jones, Jamar, Tapscott, Watts, McKenzie, Rodan, Pedersen, Davey
Mayes, Moloney, Leuenberger, Zorko, Rockliff	Best	Trengove, Watts, Terlich, Grimes, Sylvia
James Polkinghorne for tripping	Reports
Melbourne looked to continue the good form shown in their record breaking last quarter in the win against Greater Western Sydney a week earlier - and kicking five goals in the first quarter got them off to a good start, even though they also conceded five.; Brisbane took over in the second quarter, but were wasteful and only added six points to their lead. They opened up a match winning lead in the third quarter, and despite a brief rally by the Demons in the last ran away to an easy victory.; Aaron Davey replaced Sam Blease in the third quarter.; Brownlow Votes: Matthew Leuenberger 3 votes (Brisbane Lions), Dayne Zorko 2 votes (Brisbane Lions), Brent Moloney 1 vote (Brisbane Lions); Record: 1 Win, 4 Losses, 0 Draws; Ladder Position: 17th Substitutes: Aaron Davey ▲ Sam Blease ▼

==== Round 6 ====
Round 6
Sunday, 5 May (7:40 pm)	Carlton	def.	Melbourne	MCG (crowd: 35,286)
5.1.31; 8.4.52; 12.10.82; 18.13.121	Q1; Q2; Q3; Final	0.3.3; 3.7.25; 5.9.39; 8.12.60	Television broadcast: Seven Network
Garlett 4, Betts 4, Murphy 3, Armfield 2, Waite 2, Robinson, Walker, Curnow	Goals	Sylvia 2, Dunn, Tapscott, M. Jones, Kent, Garland, Bail
Murphy, Betts, Garlett, Scotland, Walker, Henderson, Waite, Hampson	Best	N. Jones, Dunn, M. Jones, Sylvia, Garland
Injuries	Jack Grimes (shoulder)
Reports	Luke Tapscott reported for rough conduct on Kade Simpson during the third quarter.
With an injury depleted lineup, and no permanent key forwards in the side, the Demons broke even with Carlton for the first five minutes of the game but couldn't capitalise on their advantage. By the time the Blues got going they were hard to stop and opened up a five goal lead by quarter time.; The Demons started to eat into Carlton's lead in the second quarter when they kicked their first goal and were awarded another shot immediately afterwards as a free kick.; Debutant Dean Kent replaced Jack Grimes in the first quarter when Grimes suffered a broken collarbone in a tackle from ex-teammate Brock McLean.; Debut(s): Dean Kent; Milestone(s): Dean Kent (1st AFL goal), M. Jones (1st AFL goal); Brownlow Votes: Marc Murphy 3 votes (Carlton), Kade Simpson 2 votes (Carlton), Jarrad Waite 1 vote (Carlton); Record: 1 Win, 5 Losses, 0 Draws; Ladder Position: 17th Substitutes: Dean Kent ▲ Jack Grimes ▼

==== Round 7 ====
Round 7
Sunday, 12 May (4:40 pm)	Melbourne	def. by	Gold Coast	MCG (crowd: 13,304)
0.2 (2); 3.7 (25); 4.10 (32); 7.12 (54)	Q1; Q2; Q3; Final	5.5 (35); 9.8 (62); 14.12 (96); 16.18 (114)	Television broadcast: Fox Footy
Howe 3, Gawn 2, Strauss, Sylvia	Goals	Smith 3, Brown 3, Lynch 2, A. Hall 2, May, McKenzie, Day, Shaw, Bennell, Harbrow
Howe, Viney, Gawn, Sylvia	Best	Ablett, Bennell, Smith, Brennan, Thompson, Prestia
McDonald (shoulder)	Injuries	Brennan (concussion), Murphy (concussion)
Colin Sylvia reported for high contact against Jared Brennan in the third quarter	Reports
Melbourne whom were undefeated against Gold Coast began the game as narrow favourites at home despite receiving humiliating losses in 4 of their first 6 games.; Gold Coast did most of the attacking early in the game on a Melbourne side plagued with key injuries, however were unable to amount their efforts on the score board.; Gold Coast however managed to run away with the game late in the first quarter when they all of a sudden piled on 5 goals to 0. From there they didn't look back as they opened up a 37-point lead at half time.; Melbourne staged a mini-comeback in the third quarter, however this was easily countered by the strength and speed of the maturing Gold Coast side led by Gary Ablett.; Gold Coast won by their largest margin of 60 points to date in their short history. They not only out-disposed Melbourne 410-309, but they also managed to evade Melbourne's tackling with strength and agility to trash them in the tackle count 71-38.; Debut(s) for MFC: Chris Dawes Collingwood; Milestone(s): James Strauss (1st AFL goal); Brownlow Votes: Gary Ablett 3 votes (Gold Coast), Dion Prestia 2 votes (Gold Coast), Harley Bennell 1 vote (Gold Coast); Record: 1 Win, 6 Losses, 0 Draws; Ladder Position: 17th Substitutes: Aaron Davey ▲ Dean Kent ▼

==== Round 8 ====
Round 8
Sunday, 19 May (3:15 pm)	Richmond	def.	Melbourne	MCG (crowd: 39,148)
2.4 (16); 7.9 (51); 12.14 (86); 15.16 (106)	Q1; Q2; Q3; Final	3.0 (18); 7.2 (44); 10.4 (64); 11.6 (72)	Television broadcast: Seven Network
Riewoldt 3, Martin 3, King 2, Deledio, Nahas, Ellis, Vlastuin, Morris, White, Chaplin	Goals	Davey 3, Dawes 2, Dunn 2, Nicholson, Bail, Howe, Evans
Ellis, Vlastuin, S. Edwards, Deledio, Grigg, Houli	Best	Davey, N. Jones, Magner, Terlich, M. Jones
Injuries	Toumpas (ankle)
After a humiliating 60-point loss to Gold Coast at home which saw club great Garry Lyon claimed that Mark Neeld's position as head coach should come under "heavy review," Melbourne responded against Richmond with far better defensive pressure, disposal efficiency and more hit outs.; Melbourne's improved performance saw them lead at the end of the first quarter for only the second time in 2013 as well hold onto an 8-point deficit at half time.; After half time Richmond's improved ball use, speed and accuracy down the corridor saw them dominate the inside 50 count 53 to 34 and they were able to capitalize with a 34-point victory. However to Melbourne's credit they did not shut-down when Richmond improved their ball use. They maintained their defensive pressure and didn't allow the margin to blow out to a larger deficit.; Brownlow Votes: Brandon Ellis 3 votes (Richmond), Aaron Davey 2 votes (Melbourne), Nick Vlastuin 1 vote (Richmond); Record: 1 Win, 7 Losses, 0 Draws; Ladder Position: 17th Substitutes: Rohan Bail ▲ Jimmy Toumpas ▼

==== Round 9 ====
Round 9
Sunday, 26 May (2:40 pm)	Fremantle	def.	Melbourne	Patersons Stadium (crowd: 32,950)
7.5 (47); 13.7 (85); 15.11 (101); 19.16 (130)	Q1; Q2; Q3; Final	1.1 (7); 2.2 (14); 5.3 (33); 6.4 (40)	Television broadcast: Fox Footy
Mzungu 3, Ballantyne 3, Mayne 2, Crozier 2, D. Pearce 2, Hannath, Crowley, Silvagni, Fyfe, Barlow, Mundy, Ibbotson	Goals	Trengove 2, Howe 2, Watts, M. Jones
Mundy, Ibbotson, Spurr, D. Pearce, Fyfe, Barlow, Mzungu	Best	Howe, Trengove, N. Jones, McKenzie
Injuries	Terlich (ribs)
Silvagni (rough conduct)	Reports
Jack Watts managed to score the first goal for Melbourne in their only game in Subiaco for 2013. However Fremantle was easily able to inflict their high intensity tackling pressure on Melbourne to create easy turnovers to score 13 consecutive goals soon after. They headed into the long break leading by 71 points.; Fremantle temporarily eased their pressure in the third quarter allowing Jack Trengove and Jeremy Howe to score multiple goals for Melbourne and allowed them to win the third quarter. However Fremantle were able to force Melbourne into a high turnover rate again in the final quarter and inflict their second consecutive thrashing over them at Subiaco.; Fremantle's intense tackling pressure allowed them to dominate the possession count 471-306 and the inside 50 count 54-25.; Brownlow Votes: David Mundy 3 votes (Fremantle), Garrick Ibbotson 2 votes (Fremantle), Nathan Fyfe 1 vote (Fremantle); Record: 1 Win, 8 Losses, 0 Draws; Ladder Position: 17th Substitutes: Rohan Bail ▲ Neville Jetta ▼

==== Round 10 ====
Round 10
Sunday, 2 June (3:15 pm)	Melbourne	def. by	Hawthorn	MCG (crowd: 28,546)
0.3 (3); 1.7 (13); 5.10 (40); 6.12 (48)	Q1; Q2; Q3; Final	3.9 (27); 12.10 (82); 14.14 (98); 21.17 (143)	Television broadcast: Seven Network
Howe, Dawes, Watts, Davey, Kent, Evans	Goals	Breust 5, Roughead 3, Hill 2, Smith 2, Franklin 2, Puopolo 2, Lewis, Burgoyne, Birchall, Grimley, Simpkin
Dawes, N. Jones, Frawley, Rodan	Best	Sewell, Breust, Burgoyne, Lewis, Smith, Mitchell
Despite premiership favourites Hawthorn kicking extremely inaccurately in front of goal in the first quarter, Melbourne were completely out-classed and out-powered in the first half of the game by them being tarnished 12 goals to 1.; For the second consecutive game Melbourne controlled the onslaught in the third quarter and won in 4 goals to 2 to cut the margin back to 58 points. However Hawthorn would find re-lift their work rate in the final quarter to blow the margin out past 100 points.; A very late goal running in from 50 metres by Michael Evans ensured that the margin fell back into double figures and ensure that Melbourne didn't lose their second game by 100+ points in 2013.; Brownlow Votes: Brad Sewell 3 votes (Hawthorn), Luke Breust 2 votes (Hawthorn), Jordan Lewis 1 vote (Hawthorn); Record: 1 Win, 9 Losses, 0 Draws; Ladder Position: 17th Substitutes: Luke Tapscott ▲ Matt Jones ▼

==== Round 11 ====
Round 11
Monday, 10 June (3:15 pm)	Melbourne	def. by	Collingwood	MCG (crowd: 50,835)
1.5 (11); 1.7 (13); 3.9 (27); 5.9 (39)	Q1; Q2; Q3; Final	1.6 (12); 7.11 (53); 12.15 (87); 17.20 (122)	Television broadcast: Seven Network
Trengove 2, Davey 2, Blease	Goals	Cloke 3, Martin 3, Kennedy 3, J. Thomas 2, Didak, Lynch, Pendlebury, O'Brien, Swan, Macaffer
Garland, McDonald, M. Jones, Terlich, N. Jones, Toumpas	Best	Swan, Ball, Shaw, Pendlebury, J. Thomas, O'Brien
Dawes (ankle), McKenzie (lacerated face)	Injuries
After strong speculation that Mark Neeld would be sacked from his senior coaching role in a scheduled board meeting which turned out not to happen a week earlier, Melbourne put a gutsy first quarter effort into their annual Queen's Birthday clash against Collingwood.; Melbourne managed to control the tempo of the game in the latter period of the first quarter with proficient ball use around the boundary-line. However they were wasteful with their opportunities and allowed Collingwood to head into quarter time with a 1-point lead.; From the second quarter onwards Collingwood would dictate play into their own hands as they managed to kick 11 consecutive goals to run away with the game. Melbourne did not score their next goal until late in the third quarter.; Collingwood's highly efficient ball use ensured that they managed to out-tackle Melbourne 57-43 despite dominating the possession count 430-340. Furthermore their intense forward pressure ensured that they won the inside 50 count 66-35.; The crowd of 50,835 was the lowest annual Queen's Birthday clash crowd recorded since Melbourne began regularly hosting Collingwood on that holiday since 2001.; Brownlow Votes: Dane Swan 3 votes (Collingwood), Scott Pendlebury 2 votes (Collingwood), Josh Thomas 1 vote (Collingwood); Record: 1 Win, 10 Losses, 0 Draws; Ladder Position: 17th Substitutes: Luke Tapscott ▲ Chris Dawes ▼

==== Round 12 ====
Round 12
Bye; Melbourne
2 major personnel replacements for the Melbourne Football Club occurred during the weekend which Melbourne had the bye.; On Friday 14 June, Melbourne president Don McLardy announced his intentions to resign from his role in order to gain the time to focus on his business sales. He also announced his intentions to resign from his role as president of the Reach Foundation. Peter Spargo would take over as interim president.; On Monday 17 June, new CEO Peter Jackson and Peter Spargo announced the sacking of senior coach Mark Neeld after only 33 games with a winning percentage of 15%. Former Adelaide senior coach Neil Craig was announced as caretaker coach for the remainder of the season.

==== Round 13 ====
Round 13
Saturday, 22 June (4:40 pm)	St Kilda	def.	Melbourne	MCG (crowd: 28,571)
7.2 (44); 10.4 (63); 15.6 (96); 16.8 (104)	Q1; Q2; Q3; Final	3.0 (18); 5.4 (34); 7.5 (47); 10.9 (69)	Television broadcast: Fox Footy
Riewoldt 3, Koschitzke 2, Ray 2, Jones, Dennis-Lane, Montagna, Ross, Dempster, Armitage, Milera, Geary	Goals	Watts 2, Howe 2, Kent, Blease, Dawes, N. Jones, Byrnes, Fitzpatrick
Montagna, Steven, Ray, Roberton, Dal Santo, Gwilt	Best	Garland, N. Jones, Blease, Dawes, McDonald, Spencer, Clisby
Fisher (foot) replaced in selected side by Murdoch, McEvoy (concussion)	Injuries
Reports	Jake Spencer reported for head-high frontal contact against Ben McEvoy in the second quarter
New caretaker coach and former Adelaide senior coach Neil Craig made his senior coaching debut for Melbourne.; Despite Melbourne conceding the first 3 goals of the game early in the first quarter, they did not allow the margin to blow out and were able to restrict St Kilda's contested ball use in an effective fashion.; In the latter 3 quarters of the game, Melbourne were able to use the ball more effectively through the midfield than St Kilda would. However they were unable to capitalize their opportunities inside their forward 50.; Melbourne managed to win the inside 50 count 46-45 as they were able to wrestle a 47-point three quarter time defect back to a 35-point loss.; Debut(s): Mitch Clisby; Brownlow Votes: Leigh Montagna 3 votes (St Kilda), Nathan Jones 2 votes (Melbourne), Jack Steven 1 vote (St Kilda); Record: 1 Win, 11 Losses, 0 Draws; Ladder Position: 17th Substitutes: Daniel Nicholson ▲ Chris Dawes ▼

==== Round 14 ====
Round 14
Saturday, 29 June (7:40 pm)	Melbourne	def.	Western Bulldogs	MCG (crowd: 21,217)
3.5 (23); 8.8 (56); 12.12 (84); 15.13 (103)	Q1; Q2; Q3; Final	2.2 (14); 4.6 (30); 6.9 (45); 15.10 (100)	Television broadcast: Fox Footy
Watts 4, Dawes 3, Fitzpatrick 2, Howe 2, N. Jones, Gawn, Rodan, Blease	Goals	Giansiracusa 3, Griffen 3, Cooney 3, Cordy 2, Macrae, Dahlhaus, Minson, Dickson
Terlich, Trengove, N. Jones, McDonald, Watts, James Frawley, Clisby	Best	Liberatore, Murphy, Giansiracusa, Minson, Griffen, Macrae
Blease (ankle)	Injuries
After a slow first quarter with neither side properly capitalizing on their scoring opportunities, Melbourne began to play a simple attacking, one-on-one style of football down the corridor with players diverging to all parts of the ground. Melbourne managed to out run the Bulldogs when they had possession of the ball and manipulated the Bulldogs into turnovers when they didn't have possession of the ball.; Melbourne's break-away second quarter allowed them to lead at half time for the first time in the season as well as the first time since Round 21, 2012.; After Melbourne managed to continue utilizing their new game-style throughout the second half, they built up a 44-point lead 13 minutes into the final quarter. However as Melbourne began to ease their pressure, the Bulldogs made a sudden and rapid comeback.; The Bulldogs managed to score 7 unanswered goals to cut the margin back to 2 points with 2 minutes remaining in the final quarter.; With another sudden clearance and inside 50 created by the Bulldogs to finally snatch back the lead, Jack Watts took a game-saving contested mark in the back line and passed it to Colin Sylvia who ran the ball forward through the corridor where it was kicked through for a behind.; The behind scored ensured Melbourne had enough time to re-settle and prevent another goal from being scored to eventually win the game.; Melbourne's won their first game against the Western Bulldogs since Round 19, 2007. This was also their first win against a non-expansion team since Round 10, 2012, and their first win against a Victorian side other than Essendon or Richmond since Round 22, 2007.; Brownlow Votes: Jack Watts 3 votes (Melbourne), Ryan Griffen 2 votes (Western Bulldogs), Tom Liberatore 1 vote (Western Bulldogs); Record: 2 Wins, 11 Losses, 0 Draws; Ladder Position: 17th Substitutes: Shannon Byrnes ▲ Sam Blease ▼

==== Round 15 ====
Round 15
Sunday, 7 July (1:10 pm)	Melbourne	def. by	Sydney	MCG (crowd: 26,216)
3.1 (19); 5.2 (32); 8.5 (53); 13.7 (85)	Q1; Q2; Q3; Final	5.3 (33); 9.13 (67); 13.18 (96); 16.20 (116)	Television broadcast: Fox Footy
Fitzpatrick 3, Howe 2, Watts 2, Dawes 2, Nicholson, N. Jones, Trengove, Davey	Goals	B. Jack 4, Tippett 2, Bird 2, Everitt, Pyke, Parker, Mitchell, K. Jack, O'Keefe, McVeigh, Lamb
Terlich, Fitzpatrick, N. Jones, Trengove, McDonald, Gawn	Best	K. Jack, O'Keefe, Kennedy, Mitchell, McVeigh, Bird, B. Jack
Frawley (hamstring)	Injuries	Reid (quad)
Despite reigning premiers Sydney kicking the first 3 goals of the game, Melbourne were able to take some of their new found form from the previous week into the game and prevent Sydney from blowing out the game.; Unlike previous games of the season Melbourne were able to make the most of their opportunities in the forward line scoring 20 scoring shots from 36 inside 50s.; The midfield game-play was dominated by Sydney as they easily won the clearance count 45-25, the hit-out count 53-33, the inside 50 count 62-36 and the contested possession count 156-117. However Melbourne's strong defensive pressure allowed Sydney to be inefficient in converting scoring opportunities into goals and they kept the losing margin to a respectable level of 31 points.; Brownlow Votes: Kieren Jack 3 votes (Sydney), Jarrad McVeigh 2 votes (Sydney), Dean Terlich 1 vote (Melbourne); Record: 2 Wins, 12 Losses, 0 Draws; Ladder Position: 17th Substitutes: Shannon Byrnes ▲ James Frawley ▼

==== Round 16 ====
Round 16
Saturday, 13 July (2:10 pm)	Geelong	def.	Melbourne	Simonds Stadium (crowd: 23,172)
4.5 (29); 7.10 (52); 11.12 (78); 13.20 (98)	Q1; Q2; Q3; Final	1.2 (8); 2.4 (16); 3.5 (23); 4.6 (30)	Television broadcast: Fox Footy
Horlin-Smith 2, Caddy 2, Hawkins 2, Podsiadly 2, Stringer, Duncan, Smedts, Motlop	Goals	Byrnes 2, Dawes, Howe
Selwood, Johnson, Kelly, Caddy, Podsiadly	Best	Byrnes, M. Jones, N. Jones, Garland
In very wet conditions, Melbourne started the game strongly leading the inside 50 count 8-5 halfway through the first quarter. However as the game continued to Geelong's much larger players began to dominate.; Much of the game was spent in Geelong's attacking half as Melbourne's younger midfielders struggled to move the ball forward.; By the end of the game Geelong dominated Melbourne with the inside 50 count 70-19. The inside 50 count differential of 51 was the largest recorded since the statistic was first measured in 1999.; Melbourne's inside 50 count of 19 was also the lowest recorded since the statistic was measured.; Melbourne's final score of 30 points was their equal lowest score at Kardinia Park.; Despite the lowly records Melbourne achieved in the game, Geelong's wayward kicking of 2.8 in the final quarter ensured that Melbourne would not concede 100+ points for the first time in the season.; Milestone(s): Nathan Jones (150th AFL game), Colin Sylvia (150th AFL game), Jeremy Howe (50th AFL game); Brownlow Votes: Steve Johnson 3 votes (Geelong), Joel Selwood 2 votes (Geelong), Nathan Jones 1 vote (Melbourne); Record: 2 Wins, 13 Losses, 0 Draws; Ladder Position: 17th Substitutes: Jack Fitzpatrick ▲ Sam Blease ▼

==== Round 17 ====
Round 17
Saturday, 20 July (7:10 pm)	Melbourne	def. by	Brisbane Lions	TIO Stadium (crowd: 7,615)
5.1 (31); 6.5 (41); 10.7 (67); 11.9 (75)	Q1; Q2; Q3; Final	3.4 (22); 8.5 (53); 11.12 (78); 13.16 (94)	Television broadcast: Fox Footy
Fitzpatrick 4, Davey 2, Blease 2, Byrnes, N. Jones, Dawes	Goals	Staker 3, Green 3, Merrett 2, Redden 2, Lisle, Mayes, Zorko
Viney, Sylvia, Davey, Byrnes, Grimes, Fitzpatrick	Best	Rockliff, Redden, Hanley, Merrett, Staker, Leuenberger
Garland (ankle)	Injuries	Brown (hip), Golby, Lisle, Docherty
In typical humid and tropical conditions, the Brisbane Lions appeared to dominate most of the ball in the first quarter, however they were unable to make the most of their opportunities. Meanwhile Melbourne were able to transition the ball rapidly from their defensive 50 to their attacking 50 to score 5 goals, 3 of which came from Jack Fitzpatrick.; The Brisbane Lions were able to cut off Melbourne's rapid transitioning from the second quarter onwards and as a result take the lead and create a comfortable margin.; Midway through the third quarter when Melbourne were 19 points down, they created a mini comeback by winning more of the clearances and hard ball gets to cut the margin back to 6 points late in the third quarter.; Despite Melbourne winning the contested ball statistics, they were unable to score on their created opportunities much further and allow Brisbane to score on their limited opportunities and eventually lose by 20 points.; Brownlow Votes: Tom Rockliff 3 votes (Brisbane Lions), Pearce Hanley 2 votes (Brisbane Lions), Jack Redden 1 vote (Brisbane Lions); Record: 2 Wins, 14 Losses, 0 Draws; Ladder Position: 17th Substitutes: Jimmy Toumpas ▲ Dean Kent ▼

==== Round 18 ====
Round 18
Saturday, 27 July (2:10 pm)	Melbourne	def. by	North Melbourne	Etihad Stadium (crowd: 16,959)
1.0 (6); 3.2 (20); 4.4 (28); 4.4 (28)	Q1; Q2; Q3; Final	3.5 (23); 6.9 (45); 14.12 (96); 22.18 (150)	Television broadcast: Fox Footy
Tapscott, Fitzpatrick, Dawes, Byrnes	Goals	Bastinac 4, Black 4, Wells 2, Adams 2, Cunnington 2, Petrie 2, Mullett 2, Goldstein 2, Harvey, Ziebell
N. Jones, Sylvia, McDonald, Gawn Dunn, Toumpas	Best	Goldstein, Cunnington, Harvey, Hansen, Thompson, Bastinac, Adams, Ziebell
Injuries	Swallow (Achilles)
With decent performances for the past 5 games under Neil Craig, Melbourne would start strongly by kicking the first goal of the game. However North Melbourne's midfield and forward pressure would be so intense that Melbourne wouldn't register another inside 50 until the end of the game.; Despite North Melbourne's shell shocking tackling and pressure on Melbourne, they were very wasteful in front of goal and they eventually allowed Melbourne back into the game by conceding consecutive goals to narrow the margin back to 12 points.; From that point on North Melbourne would hammer Melbourne in all departments of the ground and score 18 goals to 1 which included the final 8 goals of the game without a single score from Melbourne to win by easily over 100 points.; North Melbourne's combination of dominating pressure when they didn't have possession of the ball and patient short kicking up the ground when they did allowed them to annihilate key statistical measurements. This included the possession count 439-290, inside 50 count 66-30, hit-out count 59-33, clearance count 49-27 and the contested possession count 154-106.; This was the first time that Melbourne lost a premiership match at Docklands Stadium by over 100 points.; Brownlow Votes: Ben Cunnington 3 votes (North Melbourne), Todd Goldstein 2 votes (North Melbourne), Brent Harvey 1 vote (North Melbourne); Record: 2 Wins, 15 Losses, 0 Draws; Ladder Position: 17th Substitutes: Dean Kent ▲ Aaron Davey ▼

==== Round 19 ====
Round 19
Sunday, 3 August (1:45 pm)	Greater Western Sydney	def.	Melbourne	Skoda Stadium (crowd: 8,308)
5.1 (31); 9.3 (57); 12.7 (79); 19.10 (124)	Q1; Q2; Q3; Final	4.3 (27); 5.8 (38); 9.12 (66); 12.15 (87)	Television broadcast: Seven Network
Cameron 4, Ward 4, Smith 3, Whitfield 2, Giles 2, Tomlinson, Adams, Bugg, Shiel	Goals	Watts 2, Kent 2, Fitzpatrick 2, Howe, Spencer, Clisby, Trengove, Pedersen, Byrnes
Ward, Whitfield, Scully, Treloar, Hampton, Smith, Bruce, Cameron	Best	N. Jones, Clisby, Pedersen, Viney, M. Jones, Kent
Despite Greater Western Sydney being winless for the season (and for nearly twelve months), they entered as favourites heading into the match due to their decent performances in recent weeks.; Melbourne opened up a 13-point lead heading into quarter time, however Greater Western Sydney were able to kick 3 rapid goals to snatch the lead at quarter time.; With both sides evenly poised on the field, Melbourne's inaccuracy in front of goal came at a great expense as Greater Western Sydney were able to open up a 28-point lead heading into 3 quarter time, however Melbourne began to stage a comeback to quickly close the margin to 13 points, Unlike the game in Round 4, Greater Western Sydney ensured Melbourne's comeback was short lived and maximised their intensity in the final quarter to run away with the game by 37 points.; Greater Western Sydney's win was their first and only for 2013 and their first win since Round 19, 2012.; Melbourne's loss was their first against Greater Western Sydney as they became only the second team after Port Adelaide to register losses against both expansion teams.; Milestone(s): Mitch Clisby (1st AFL goal); Brownlow Votes: Callan Ward 3 votes (Greater Western Sydney), Tom Scully 2 votes (Greater Western Sydney), Lachie Whitfield 1 vote (Greater Western Sydney); Record: 2 Wins, 16 Losses, 0 Draws; Ladder Position: 17th Substitutes: Aaron Davey ▲ Max Gawn ▼

==== Round 20 ====
Round 20
Saturday, 10 August (7:40 pm)	Gold Coast	def.	Melbourne	Metricon Stadium (crowd: 13,840)
2.4 (16); 5.9 (39); 10.11 (71); 13.12 (90)	Q1; Q2; Q3; Final	3.2 (20); 5.6 (36); 8.11 (59); 10.17 (77)	Television broadcast: Fox Footy
Brown 3, Sumner 2, Ablett, Hall, Dixon, Swallow, Thompson, Bennell, Day, Stanley	Goals	Watts 2, Kent 2, Sylvia, Byrnes, Fitzpatrick, Tapscott, Davey, McKenzie
Swallow, Bennell, Prestia, Brown, O'Meara, Thompson	Best	Viney, Sylvia, N. Jones, McKenzie, Garland
Bock (leg), Sexton (shoulder), Day (hamstring)	Injuries
With Gary Ablett playing his 250th AFL game and Gold Coast playing dominant football at home against the Victorian teams they were placed as overwhelming favourite against Melbourne.; Melbourne surprisingly were able to play with speed down the corridor to Gold Coast's surprise and take out a lead at quarter time.; Gold Coast were able to wrestle their way back into the game despite the growing number of injuries to their bench.; With 3 quarter time approaching and Melbourne dominating much of the contested possessions and inside 50s to lead by 6 points, Gold Coast kicked 3 sudden goals just before 3 quarter time and another 3 sudden goals just after 3 quarter time to run away with a 27-point lead.; After Gold Coast's attacking surge ended, Melbourne would again control much of the contested possessions and scoring opportunities. However their poor accuracy in front of goal restricted them to adding only another 2 goals at the end of the game in junk time.; Heavy tagging work from Jordie McKenzie, Colin Garland and Mitch Clisby restricted Gary Ablett's impact on the game as he was only able to gain 19 possessions and a goal in his milestone game.; Debut(s): Troy Davis; Brownlow Votes: Harley Bennell 3 votes (Gold Coast), Jack Viney 2 votes (Melbourne), David Swallow 1 vote (Gold Coast); Record: 2 Wins, 17 Losses, 0 Draws; Ladder Position: 17th Substitutes: Aaron Davey ▲ Daniel Nicholson ▼

==== Round 21 ====
Round 21
Sunday, 18 August (1:10 pm)	Melbourne	def. by	Fremantle	MCG (crowd: 13,768)
0.2 (2); 4.5 (29); 5.5 (35); 5.8 (38)	Q1; Q2; Q3; Final	4.5 (29); 9.6 (60); 14.11 (95); 20.13 (133)	Television broadcast: Fox Footy
Kent, Howe, Davis, Viney, Fitzpatrick	Goals	Ballantyne 4, Pavlich 4, Hill 2, Mayne 2, Sandilands, Silvagni, Walters, Clarke, Sheridan, Spurr, Fyfe, D. Pearce
Viney, Trengove, McDonald, M. Jones	Best	D. Pearce, Barlow, Mundy, Hill, Mzungu, Crowley, Clarke
Blease (leg), Strauss (shoulder), Byrnes (foot)	Injuries	Sandilands (concussion), Ballantyne (shoulder)
In front of a small crowd of less than 14,000 people, Fremantle's immense defensive structures would completely maul Melbourne's midfield from moving the ball forward as they recorded the first 16 inside 50s before Melbourne could register a score.; Fremantle's steady margin building via heavy defence in the first quarter was eventually boosted by a string of 5 consecutive goals in the second quarter as they rapidly turned a 20-point margin into a 50-point margin.; Melbourne were able eventually respond to Fremantle's 5 goal surge by kicking 3 straight goals towards the end of the second quarter. However they were only able to score one more goal for the second half as Fremantle's brand of shut-down football allowed them to dominate the possession and movement of the ball to score 11 more one more goals for the second half.; Melbourne received their lowest score and heaviest loss in their history against Fremantle beating the record set earlier in the season in Round 9.; Melbourne's 95-point loss meant that they were annihilated in all 3 meetings against the Western Australian teams by 90+ points.; Milestone(s): Troy Davis (1st AFL goal), Jack Viney (Rising Star round nominee); Brownlow Votes: David Mundy 3 votes (Fremantle), Danyle Pearce 2 votes (Fremantle), Zac Clarke 1 vote (Fremantle); Record: 2 Wins, 18 Losses, 0 Draws; Ladder Position: 17th Substitutes: Aaron Davey ▲ Sam Blease ▼

==== Round 22 ====
Round 22
Saturday, 24 August (1:15 pm)	Adelaide	def.	Melbourne	AAMI Stadium (crowd: 35,643)
1.2 (8); 7.4 (46); 11.8 (74); 18.12 (120)	Q1; Q2; Q3; Final	2.3 (15); 4.5 (29); 5.9 (39); 7.10 (52)	Television broadcast: Seven Network
Johnston 6, Callinan 2, Douglas 2, Jacobs, Kerridge, S. Thompson, Talia, Dangerfield, van Berlo, Otten, Grigg	Goals	Howe 2, Watts 2, Sylvia 2, Tapscott
S. Thompson, Laird, Johnston, Kerridge, Sloane, Crouch	Best	M. Jones, N. Jones, Toumpas, Dunn, Terlich, Trengove
Talia (back)	Injuries	Rodan (ankle), Howe (cut face)
Neil Craig's second last game as caretaker coach for Melbourne was against his old side Adelaide.; This was the last game held at Football Park for both Adelaide and Melbourne, before Adelaide Oval became the new primary venue to host AFL games in South Australia beginning from 2014.; Melbourne's last game at Football Park was also their first game there since Round 13, 2010.; In front of a large crowd, Melbourne would silence them early when they made the most of their limited inside 50 opportunities to take a rare interstate lead into quarter time.; Adelaide however would begin to dominate the clearance in the second quarter and get the crowd involved to score a string of 6 consecutive goals in the second quarter and take a lead of 30 points.; 2 late goals in the second quarter from Melbourne re-stabilized the match throughout the third quarter as Adelaide were only able to score 4 goals to 1 despite them dominating the inside 50 and hard ball get count.; 2 quick goals in the final quarter reduced the margin down to 23 points as a close finish looked set to occur. However Adelaide had the last laugh when they piled on the last 7 goals of the game with the crowd finding their voice again to thrash Melbourne by 68 points.; Melbourne's miserable record at the ground ended with 5 wins and 24 losses which included an unbroken drought stemming back to Round 2, 2001.; Brownlow Votes: Scott Thompson 3 votes (Adelaide), Lewis Johnston 2 votes (Adelaide), Brad Crouch 1 vote (Adelaide); Record: 2 Wins, 19 Losses, 0 Draws; Ladder Position: 17th Substitutes: Aaron Davey ▲ David Rodan ▼

==== Round 23 ====
Round 23
Sunday, 1 September (4:40 pm)	Western Bulldogs	def.	Melbourne	Etihad Stadium (crowd: 22,176)
4.3 (27); 13.6 (84); 14.8 (92); 16.11 (107)	Q1; Q2; Q3; Final	4.5 (29); 6.5 (41); 9.7 (61); 13.9 (87)	Television broadcast: Fox Footy
Dickson 3, Hunter 2, Cooney 2, Jones 2, Wallis, Grant, Cross, Liberatore, Minson	Goals	Watts 4, Kent 2, N. Jones, Garland, Howe, Sellar, Viney, M. Jones, Dunn
Liberatore, Murphy, Minson, Cooney, Hunter, Boyd	Best	Trengove, Viney, Garland, Watts, Frawley
Giansiracusa (ankle)	Injuries	Dawes (calf)
In the final game of a disastrous season, Melbourne were able to attack early in the game scoring 3 consecutive goals and lead by 2 points at half time.; After Melbourne kicked the first goal of the second quarter, the Western Bulldogs blew the game away much with a scoring frenzy much like one they created in the final quarter of their Round 14 clash by scoring 9 consecutive goals to create a 43-point lead at half time.; The pace of the game slowed down in the third quarter and after the Western Bulldogs kicked the first major of the second half. Melbourne all of a sudden responded with 3 quick goals to downgrade the deficit to 31 points.; Melbourne were able to score the first 2 goals of the final quarter, however were unable to cut the margin back as they were only able to fix half of the damage created in the second quarters to lose by 20 points.; Aaron Davey played his last AFL game in this match and retired straight afterwards.; Brownlow Votes: Matthew Boyd 3 votes (Western Bulldogs), Adam Cooney 2 votes (Western Bulldogs), Tom Liberatore 1 vote (Western Bulldogs); Record: 2 Wins, 20 Losses, 0 Draws; Ladder Position: 17th Substitutes: Luke Tapscott ▲ Max Gawn ▼

== Ladder ==
2013 AFL ladder
Pos	Team	Pld	W	L	D	PF	PA	PP	Pts	
1	Hawthorn (P)	22	19	3	0	2523	1859	135.7	76	Finals series
2	Geelong	22	18	4	0	2409	1776	135.6	72	Finals series
3	Fremantle	22	16	5	1	2035	1518	134.1	66	Finals series
4	Sydney	22	15	6	1	2244	1694	132.5	62	Finals series
5	Richmond	22	15	7	0	2154	1754	122.8	60	Finals series
6	Collingwood	22	14	8	0	2148	1868	115.0	56	Finals series
7	Port Adelaide	22	12	10	0	2051	2002	102.4	48	Finals series
8	Carlton	22	11	11	0	2125	1992	106.7	44	Finals series
9	Essendon	22	14	8	0	2145	2000	107.3	56 (Note: Essendon was relegated to ninth due to irregularities in its supplements program during the 2012 season.)	
10	North Melbourne	22	10	12	0	2307	1930	119.5	40	
11	Adelaide	22	10	12	0	2064	1909	108.1	40	
12	Brisbane Lions	22	10	12	0	1922	2144	89.6	40	
13	West Coast	22	9	13	0	2038	2139	95.3	36	
14	Gold Coast	22	8	14	0	1918	2091	91.7	32	
15	Western Bulldogs	22	8	14	0	1926	2262	85.1	32	
16	St Kilda	22	5	17	0	1751	2120	82.6	20	
17	Melbourne	22	2	20	0	1455	2691	54.1	8	
18	Greater Western Sydney	22	1	21	0	1524	2990	51.0	4	

Source: AFL Tables
Rules for classification: 1) points; 2) percentage; 3) number of points for.
(P) Premiers

=== Ladder breakdown by opposition ===
Opponent	Played	Won	Lost	Drew	Premiership points	Points for	Points against	Percentage (%)
Greater Western Sydney	2	1	1	0	4	231	227	101.76
Western Bulldogs	2	1	1	0	4	190	207	91.79
Brisbane Lions	2	0	2	0	0	169	216	78.24
Sydney	1	0	1	0	0	85	116	73.28
Richmond	1	0	1	0	0	72	106	67.92
St Kilda	1	0	1	0	0	69	104	66.35
Gold Coast	2	0	2	0	0	131	204	64.22
Carlton	1	0	1	0	0	60	121	49.59
West Coast	1	0	1	0	0	83	177	46.89
Adelaide	1	0	1	0	0	52	120	43.33
Port Adelaide	1	0	1	0	0	54	133	40.60
Hawthorn	1	0	1	0	0	48	143	33.57
Collingwood	1	0	1	0	0	39	122	31.97
Geelong	1	0	1	0	0	30	98	30.31
Fremantle	2	0	2	0	0	78	263	29.66
Essendon	1	0	1	0	0	36	184	19.56
North Melbourne	1	0	1	0	0	28	150	18.67
Total	22	2	20	0	8	1455	2691	54.07

== Football Department and Board Restructure ==
2013 was Melbourne's worst season in a horrible string of seasons dating back to the 2007 AFL season. As a result, many Melbourne personnel who were part of the Jim Stynes-led board or football department originating back to 2008 either resigned or were dismissed from their positions. Because many personnel were in the midst of their contracts, they required large pay-outs which Melbourne couldn't financially cope with.

On 19 February 2013, Melbourne were found not guilty from their tanking scandal originating from 2009. However, they received a $500,000 fine as the employers of the General Manager of Football Operations Chris Connolly and former Melbourne senior coach Dean Bailey, both of whom were found guilty in the investigation. Chris Connolly, who was still working at the Melbourne Football Club at the time the suspension was handed out received a 12-month suspension which prevented him from being involved at any club until 1 February 2014.

On 10 April 2013, four days after Melbourne's 148-point loss against Essendon, Cameron Schwab was asked to leave from his position as CEO after he originally had his contract renewed for a three-year term from 27 August by Don McLardy. Cameron Schwab accepted, and received an approximate $250,000 payout. Peter Spargo then took over as interim CEO before former Essendon CEO Peter Jackson took over the role on an interim basis for six months from 1 May 2013.

On 31 May 2013, Chris Connolly was given a two-year contract extension despite being in the process of serving his suspension.

On 3 June 2013, after a marathon scheduled board meeting in which Mark Neeld was speculated to be sacked from his role as Melbourne senior coach, Peter Jackson announced his findings from his first month as operating CEO of the club. He then proceeded to announce his recommendations to the club and agree to a contract extension until the end of 2014 to help carry out those recommendations. Neeld survived this board meeting.

On 6 June 2013, former Victorian Premier and former Hawthorn President Jeff Kennett claimed that he had been approached by the Melbourne Football Club board to take over as Melbourne President and encouraged on supporters to call and extraordinary general meeting to oust Don McLardy.

On 14 June 2013, Peter Jackson and Don McLardy made a plea to the AFL to receive emergency funding in order to reshape the entire board and football department on the condition that they provided a detailed plan that would be strictly carried through. This included the removal of several key personnel, the prevention of Jeff Kennett's campaign as Melbourne president from becoming successful and the prevention of Stephen Dank's alleged text message to Melbourne's Football Department as part of Essendon's drug scandal from having any immediate impact on the funds received.

Also on 14 June 2013, Don McLardy announced his resignation as Melbourne Football Club president as well as the president of the Reach Foundation. Peter Spargo took over the role as Melbourne's interim president. In addition, Stuart Grimshaw resigned from his role on Melbourne's board.

On 17 June 2013, Peter Jackson announced the immediate termination of Mark Neeld's role as Melbourne senior coach only eighteen months into his three-year contract. He received a payout of around $600,000. Former Adelaide senior coach Neil Craig would take over as Melbourne's interim senior coach for the rest of the season.

On 25 June 2013, Melbourne's list manager Tim Harrington would have his contract terminated as Peter Jackson also advertised the new role of General Manager of Football Operations.

On 26 June 2013, Melbourne's vice-president Guy Jalland announced his resignation from the board. 3 days later on 29 June 2013, Karen Hayes also announced her resignation from the board.

On 11 July 2013, Peter Jackson announced his intention to snare former Sydney Swans and 2005 premiership coach Paul Roos to become the new senior coach of the Melbourne Football Club from 2014 onwards. Paul Roos however claimed that he had not warmed up to the idea for a return to senior-coaching.

On 12 July 2013, former West Coast player and Bernie Naylor Medallist Glen Bartlett joined the Board of the Melbourne Football Club.

On 17 July 2013, the AFL finally gave a $2,500,000 bail out package for Melbourne to use for their proposed emergency funding.

On 16 August 2013, Glen Bartlett was appointed as the new president of the Melbourne Football Club defeating a bid made by former Victorian Treasurer Alan Stockdale.

On 6 September 2013, Paul Roos was announced as the new senior-coach of the Melbourne Football Club. He signed a $2,000,000 deal for two years with the option of a third year.

On 9 September 2013, Neil Craig announced his intentions to leave the club as he had no new place on Paul Roos' new football department. He was not offered a new contract along with forward-line coach Leigh Brown and midfield coach Brian Royal.

On 2 October 2013, former CEO of VicSport Kate Raffey joined the board as well as former Melbourne footballer Jeremy Nichols on 1 November 2013

On 10 October 2013, Chris Connolly had his contract terminated despite signing a two-year extension earlier in the year in order decrease the overall cost of Melbourne's management structure.

Melbourne's horrendous season of poor on-field form, tanking investigations, contract terminations, payouts and complete football department/board restructuring meant that they recorded a net loss of $1,700,000. This included a statutory loss of $3,100,000 with the AFL's bail out funding for 2013 of $1,450,000 not being taken into account.

== Awards ==
=== Brownlow Medal tally ===
Player	1 vote games	2 vote games	3 vote games	Total votes
Nathan Jones	1	1	1	(6)
Jack Watts	0	0	1	(3)
Shannon Byrnes	0	1	0	(2)
Aaron Davey	0	1	0	(2)
Jack Viney	0	1	0	(2)
Dean Terlich	1	0	0	(1)
Total	2	4	2	(16)

The 16 votes Melbourne collected in 2013 is the lowest ever by any team in a season under the 3-2-1 voting system.

=== Keith 'Bluey' Truscott Medal tally (top 10) ===
Position	Player	Votes
1st	Nathan Jones	365
2nd	Colin Garland	360
3rd	Dean Terlich	306
4th	Matt Jones	303
5th	Colin Sylvia	288
6th	Lynden Dunn	270
7th	James Frawley	268
8th	Jack Trengove	257
9th	Jeremy Howe	256
10th	Tom McDonald	249

Keith 'Bluey' Truscott Trophy – Nathan Jones

Sid Anderson Memorial Trophy (Second in the Best and Fairest) – Colin Garland

Ron Barassi Snr Memorial Trophy (Third in the Best and Fairest) – Dean Terlich

Ivor Warne-Smith Memorial Trophy (Fourth in the Best and Fairest) – Matt Jones

Dick Taylor Memorial Trophy (Fifth in the Best and Fairest) – Colin Sylvia

Harold Ball Memorial Trophy (Best Young Player) – Jack Viney

Troy Broadbridge Trophy (highest polling MFC player in the Casey Best and Fairest) – Jesse Hogan

Ron Barassi Leadership Award – Colin Garland

Ian Ridley Club Ambassador Award – Colin Sylvia

Norm Smith Memorial Trophy (Coach's Award) – Jake Spencer

Leading Goalkicker Award – Jeremy Howe (28)
