= Milera =

Milera is a surname. Notable people with the surname include:

- Terry Milera (born 1988), Australian rules footballer
- Wayne Milera (born 1997), Australian rules footballer
