= Dean Terlich =

Australian rules footballer

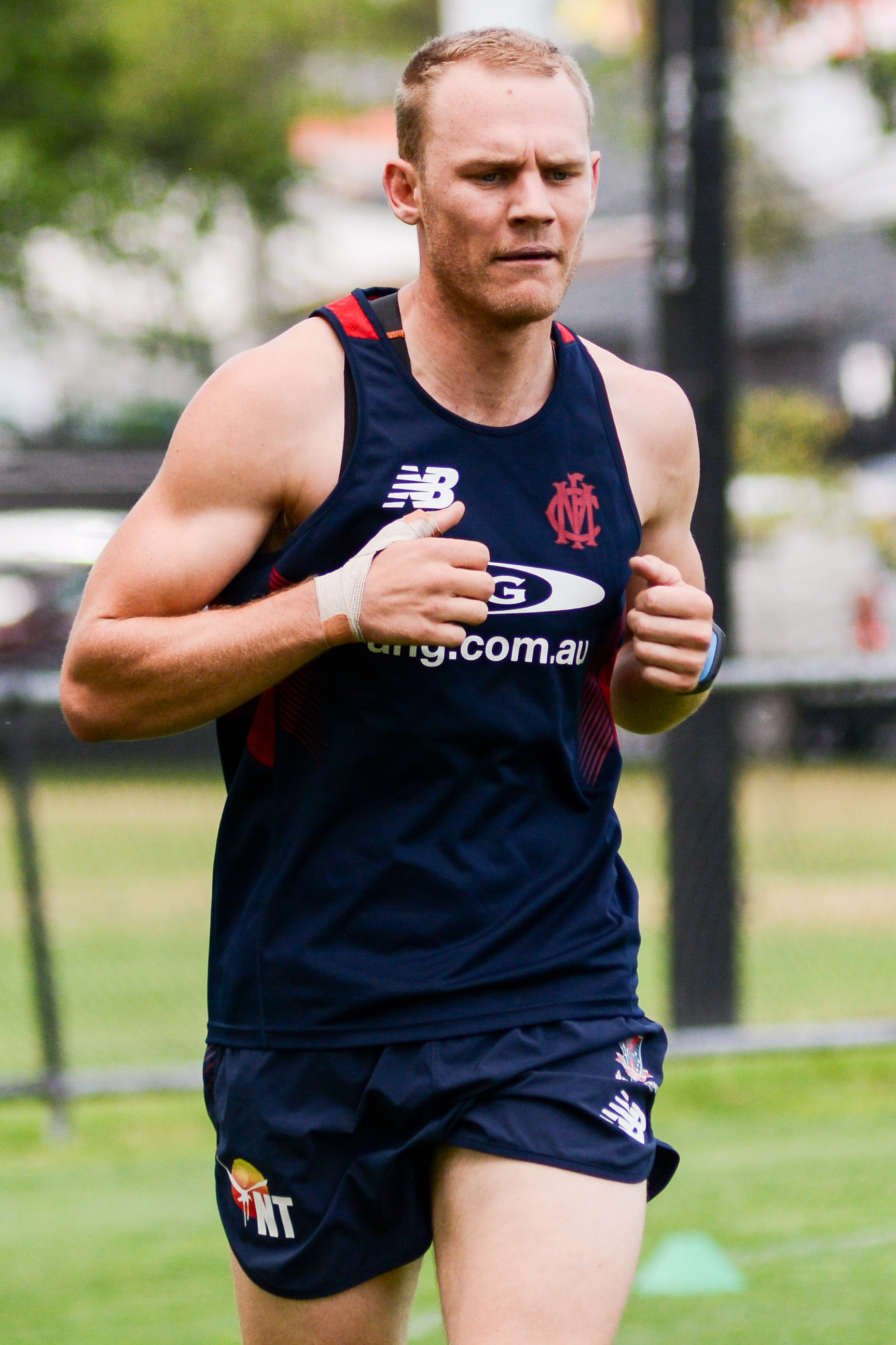
- Terlich at training in November 2015

Personal information
- Full name: Dean Terlich
- Born: 13 December 1989 (age 36)
- Original teams: Osborne, Norwood (SANFL)
- Draft: No. 61, 2008 rookie draft No. 68, 2012 national draft
- Debut: Round 2, 2013, Melbourne vs. Essendon, at MCG
- Height: 186 cm (6 ft 1 in)
- Weight: 87 kg (192 lb)
- Position: Defender

Playing career^{1}
Years	Club	Games (Goals)
2008	Sydney	0 (0)
2013–2016	Melbourne	35 (2)
Total		35 (2)
- ^{1} Playing statistics correct to the end of 2016.

Career highlights
- Norwood Premiership player 2012; SANFL Jack Oatey Medallist 2012

Dean Terlich (born 13 December 1989) is a former professional Australian rules footballer who played for the Melbourne Football Club in the Australian Football League (AFL). He was recruited by the club with draft pick 68 in the 2012 national draft. He made his debut in round 2, 2013, against Essendon at the Melbourne Cricket Ground, in the match where Melbourne were defeated by 148 points.

Terlich was previously recruited by the Sydney Swans in the 2008 rookie draft from the Murray Bushrangers. Terlich was recruited from the Osborne Cats (country NSW Hume League club) prior to playing with the representative team the Murray Bushrangers. He was delisted at the end of the 2008 season without playing an AFL game.

Terlich moved to Adelaide and played for Norwood in the South Australian National Football League (SANFL), where he won the Jack Oatey Medal as the best on ground in Norwood's 12.7 (79) to 3.12 (30) win over West Adelaide in the 2012 SANFL Grand Final.

Terlich enjoyed a successful debut year at the Melbourne Football Club where he averaged nearly 20 possessions a game. He capped off his first year by finishing third in the Keith 'Bluey' Truscott Medal behind Colin Garland and winner Nathan Jones.

He was delisted at the conclusion of the 2016 season. In 2018 Dean signed as playing/coach of the Tanunda Magpies in the Barossa light and Gawler association. On 28 September 2020, it was announced that Terlich had signed on as senior playing coach of the Uraidla Districts Football Club A Grade side in the Hills Football League.

== Statistics ==
Legend
G	Goals	K	Kicks	D	Disposals	T	Tackles
B	Behinds	H	Handballs	M	Marks

Season	Team	No.	Games	Totals							Averages (per game)						
Season	Team	No.	Games	G	B	K	H	D	M	T	G	B	K	H	D	M	T
2013	Melbourne	46	20	0	2	244	151	395	103	70	0.0	0.1	12.2	7.6	19.8	5.2	3.5
2014	Melbourne	46	15	2	1	139	83	222	56	43	0.1	0.1	9.3	5.5	14.8	3.7	2.9
2015	Melbourne	46	0	—	—	—	—	—	—	—	—	—	—	—	—	—	—
2016	Melbourne	46	0	—	—	—	—	—	—	—	—	—	—	—	—	—	—
Career			35	2	3	383	234	617	159	113	0.1	0.1	10.9	6.7	17.6	4.5	3.2
