= Matt Jones (Australian footballer) =

Australian rules footballer

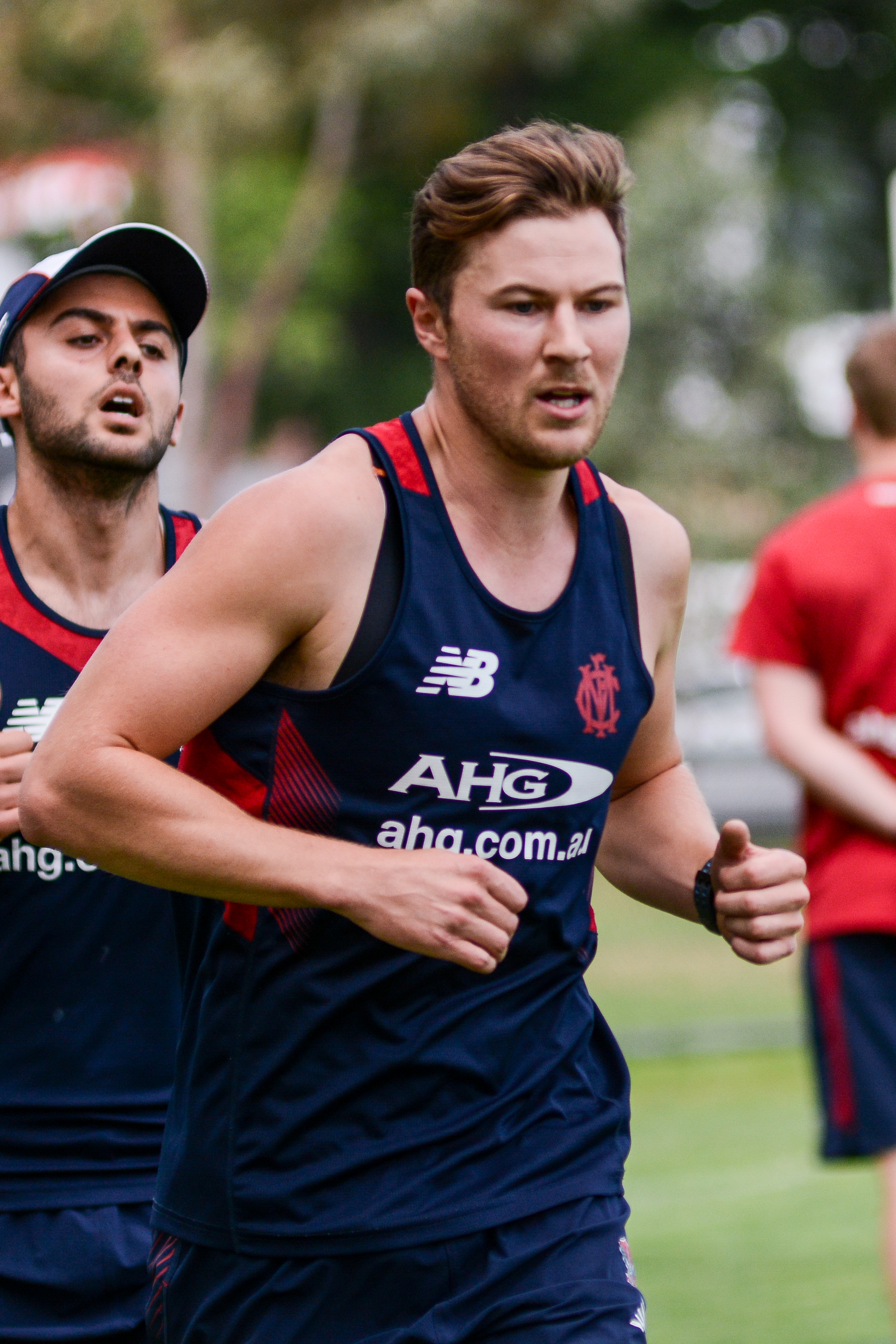
- Jones (right) at training in November 2015

Personal information
- Full name: Matthew Jones
- Born: 18 October 1987 (age 39)
- Original team: Box Hill Hawks (VFL)
- Draft: No. 53, 2012 national draft
- Debut: Round 1, 2013, Melbourne vs. Port Adelaide, at MCG
- Height: 188 cm (6 ft 2 in)
- Weight: 81 kg (179 lb)
- Position: Midfielder

Playing career^{1}
Years	Club	Games (Goals)
2013–2016	Melbourne	61 (10)
- ^{1} Playing statistics correct to the end of 2016.

Matt Jones (born 18 October 1987) is a former professional Australian rules footballer who played for the Melbourne Football Club in the Australian Football League (AFL). He was recruited by the club with 53rd selection in the 2012 national draft after playing for South Croydon and Box Hill. He made his debut in round 1, 2013, against Port Adelaide at the Melbourne Cricket Ground. He was delisted at the conclusion of the 2016 season.

== Statistics ==
Legend
G	Goals	K	Kicks	D	Disposals	T	Tackles
B	Behinds	H	Handballs	M	Marks

Season	Team	No.	Games	Totals							Averages (per game)						
Season	Team	No.	Games	G	B	K	H	D	M	T	G	B	K	H	D	M	T
2013	Melbourne	45	22	3	4	216	208	424	91	59	0.1	0.2	9.8	9.5	19.3	4.1	2.7
2014	Melbourne	45	20	3	4	213	168	381	98	53	0.2	0.2	10.7	8.4	19.1	4.9	2.7
2015	Melbourne	45	9	4	2	48	45	93	25	25	0.4	0.2	5.3	5.0	10.3	2.8	2.8
2016	Melbourne	45	10	1	0	99	106	205	45	35	0.1	0.0	9.9	10.6	20.5	4.5	3.5
Career			61	11	10	576	527	1103	259	172	0.2	0.2	9.4	8.6	18.1	4.2	2.8
