= Dean Kent (footballer) =

Australian rules footballer (born 1994)

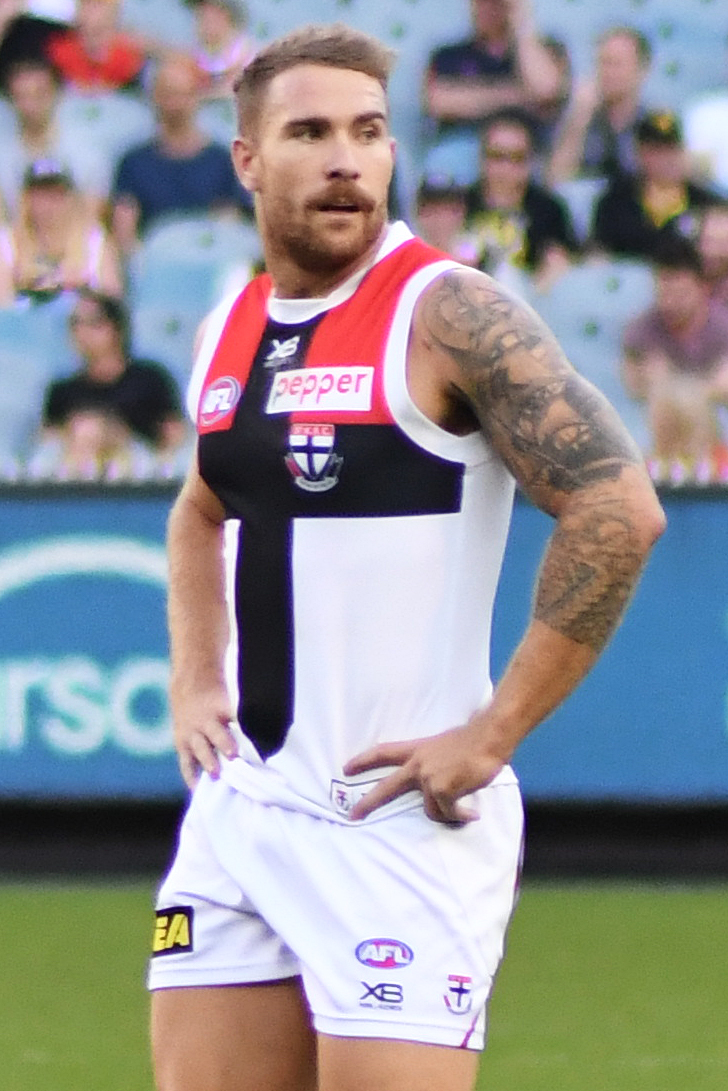
- Kent playing for stkilda 2019

Personal information
- Full name: Dean Kent
- Nickname: Deanbag
- Born: 24 February 1994 (age 32); Western Australia
- Original team: Perth (WAFL)
- Draft: No. 48, 2012 national draft
- Debut: Round 6, 2013, Melbourne vs. Carlton, at MCG
- Height: 179 cm (5 ft 10 in)
- Weight: 86 kg (190 lb)
- Position: Forward / midfielder

Playing career^{1}
Years	Club	Games (Goals)
2013–2018	Melbourne	63 (63)
2019–2022	St Kilda	37 (28)
Total		100 (91)
- ^{1} Playing statistics correct to the end of 2020.

Dean Kent (born 24 February 1994) is a former professional Australian rules footballer who played for the Melbourne and St Kilda Football Clubs in the Australian Football League (AFL). A forward, 1.79 metres (5 ft 10 in) tall and weighing 86 kilograms (190 lb), Kent played primarily as a small forward with the ability to push into the midfield. He had a successful final junior year in the colts competition in the West Australian Football League (WAFL) in which he won the Jack Clarke Medal as the fairest and best player, the league coaches award and was named in the team of the year. His performances as a junior saw him recruited by the Melbourne Football Club with the forty-eighth selection in the 2012 AFL draft and make his AFL debut during the 2013 season.

== Early life ==
Growing up in Clackline, Western Australia, Kent received state honours when he represented Western Australia in the under 16 championships. A dose of Bali belly hampered his final junior year though, which saw him quickly lose weight and subsequently miss selection for Western Australia in the 2012 AFL Under 18 Championships. He did, however, play twenty games for the Perth Football Club in the West Australian Football League (WAFL) colts competition, and won the Jack Clarke Medal as the fairest and best player in the colts. In addition to being named in the colts team of the year and win the league coaches award.

== AFL career ==
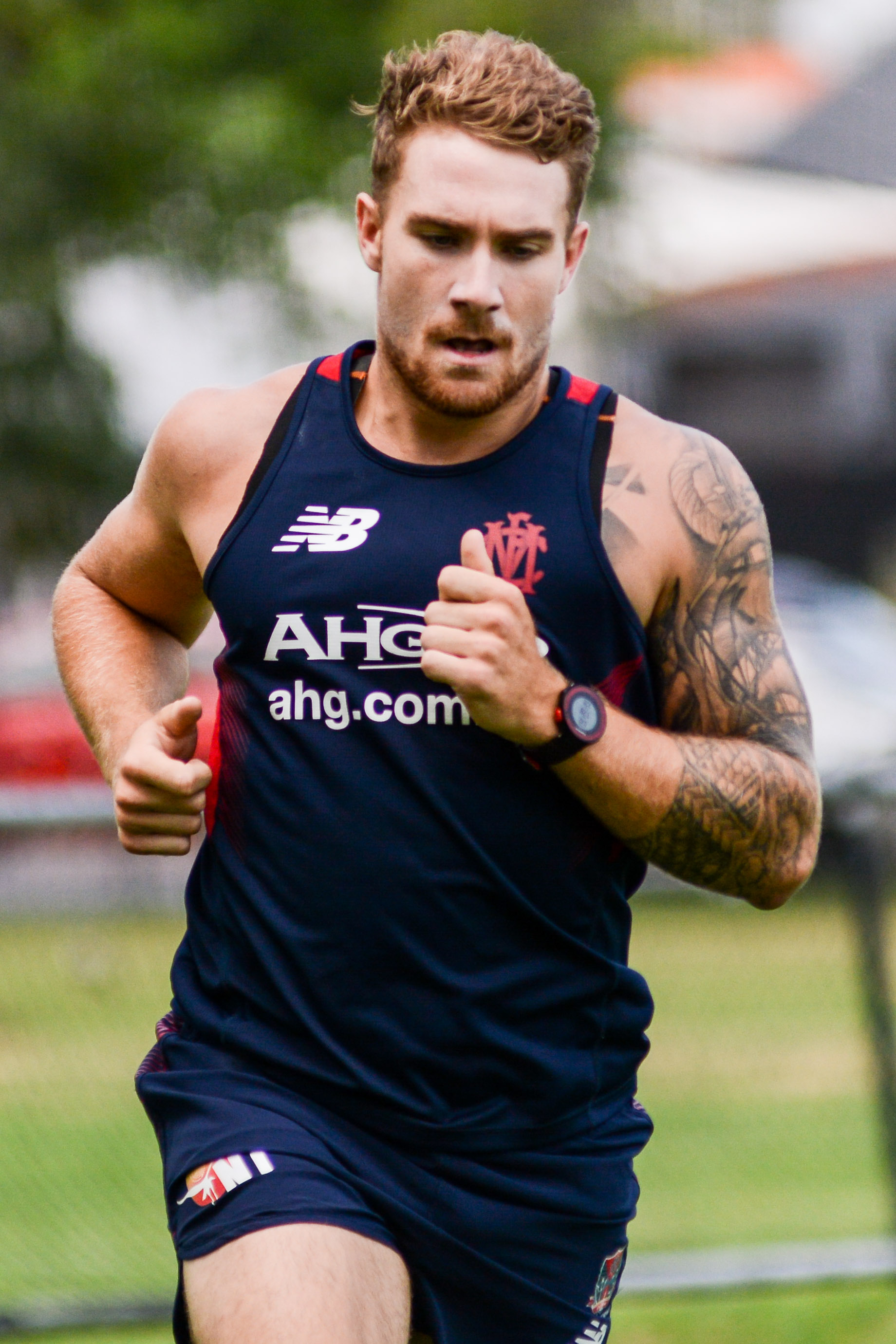
Kent at training in November 2015

Kent was recruited by the Melbourne Football Club with their third selection and forty-eighth overall in the 2012 national draft. After strong form in the Victorian Football League (VFL) for Melbourne's affiliate team, the Casey Scorpions, he made his AFL debut in the sixty-one point loss against Carlton at the Melbourne Cricket Ground in round six. He started the match as the substitute, but came into the match in the first quarter, replacing the injured co-captain, Jack Grimes. He played the next week before he was omitted for the round eight clash against Richmond at the Melbourne Cricket Ground; he returned to the senior side for the ninety-five point loss against Hawthorn at the Melbourne Cricket Ground in round ten and did not miss a match for the remainder of the season to finish with fifteen matches for the year.

Kent played his first match for the 2014 season in the thirty-two point loss against Greater Western Sydney at Spotless Stadium in round three. He played the next week before he was forced to be a late withdrawal from the round five match against Gold Coast after injuring his calf at training. He missed the next month of football before returning from injury through the VFL, and returned to the AFL side for the one point win against Essendon at the Melbourne Cricket Ground in round thirteen. He played every match for the remainder of the year, playing thirteen matches in total.

Kent started the 2015 season in the AFL when he played in the twenty-six point win against Gold Coast at the Melbourne Cricket Ground in round one. He played the first four matches of the year before suffering a hamstring injury in the second quarter of the round four win against Richmond, with the initial prognosis ruling him out for one month. After requiring surgery on his hamstring, he was forced to miss nearly three months of any football. He returned from injury via the VFL Development League, where he tore his hamstring again and missed the next four weeks. He didn't play another AFL match for the season, he did, however, play the last three VFL matches of the year.

After having his first pre-season without suffering from an injury, and playing every match in the 2016 NAB Challenge, Kent played in the opening match of the season in the two-point win against Greater Western Sydney at the Melbourne Cricket Ground. He played the first seven matches of the year before missing the round eight match against the Western Bulldogs in round eight due to a back injury; he returned the next week in the sixty-three point win against Brisbane at the Melbourne Cricket Ground. In July, he signed a two-year contract, tying him to the club until the end of the 2018 season. He played his fiftieth AFL match in the twenty-nine point win against Hawthorn at the Melbourne Cricket Ground in round twenty. After playing twenty matches for the season, he was praised by Fox Sports Australia journalist, Tiarne Swersky, where he was named as one of Melbourne's "most important and lively players up forward," furthermore, he finished tenth in Melbourne best and fairest count, and was named in the initial 22under22 squad.

Kent had a delayed start to the 2017 season after experiencing a persistent back injury during the pre-season. He didn't play his first match of the year until the twenty-nine point loss against Geelong at Etihad Stadium in round three. He played two matches before he was omitted for the round five match against Richmond at the Melbourne Cricket Ground. He was recalled to the AFL side for the forty-one point win against Adelaide at Adelaide Oval in round eight and could only manage two consecutive matches before he was dropped for the round ten match against Gold Coast at TIO Traeger Park. It took nearly two months for Kent to find his way back into the senior team, which was delayed due to a club suspension for breaching club rules on alcohol protocols. He returned to the AFL side a week after his club suspension for the eight point win against Carlton at the Melbourne Cricket Ground in round sixteen. In his second match back in the AFL, he dislocated his shoulder when tackling Rory Sloane in the match against Adelaide at TIO Stadium and he missed the remainder of the season, playing just six games for the year.

At the conclusion of the 2018 season, Kent requested a trade to St Kilda. He was officially traded on 12 October.

== Statistics ==
Statistics are correct to the end of the 2022 season

Legend
G	Goals	K	Kicks	D	Disposals	T	Tackles
B	Behinds	H	Handballs	M	Marks

Season	Team	No.	Games	Totals							Averages (per game)						
Season	Team	No.	Games	G	B	K	H	D	M	T	G	B	K	H	D	M	T
2013	Melbourne	34	15	10	5	106	42	148	40	26	0.7	0.3	7.1	2.8	9.9	2.7	1.7
2014	Melbourne	16	13	12	10	98	58	156	42	25	0.9	0.8	7.5	4.5	12.0	3.2	1.9
2015	Melbourne	16	4	2	4	24	15	39	5	7	0.5	1.0	6.0	3.8	9.8	1.3	1.8
2016	Melbourne	16	20	25	10	189	135	324	71	58	1.3	0.5	9.5	6.8	16.3	3.6	2.9
2017	Melbourne	16	6	7	6	56	34	90	27	13	1.2	1.0	9.3	5.7	15.0	4.5	2.2
2018	Melbourne	16	5	7	3	33	25	58	14	15	1.4	0.6	6.6	5.0	11.6	2.8	3.0
2019	St Kilda	25	13	12	14	124	42	166	59	24	0.9	1.1	9.5	3.2	12.8	4.5	1.9
2020 (Note: The 2020 season was played with 17 home-and-away matches per team (down from 22) and 16-minute quarters with time on (down from 20-minute quarters with time on) due to the impact of the COVID-19 pandemic.)	St Kilda	25	15	10	5	96	46	142	48	29	0.7	0.3	6.4	3.1	9.5	3.2	1.9
2021	St Kilda	25	7	5	6	56	40	96	35	22	0.7	0.9	8.0	5.7	13.7	5.0	3.1
2022	St Kilda	25	2	1	0	5	3	8	3	5	0.5	0	2.5	1.5	4.0	1.5	2.5
Career			100	91	63	787	440	1227	344	224	0.9	0.6	7.9	4.4	12.3	3.4	2.2
