= Mark Neeld =

Australian rules footballer

Personal information
- Full name: Mark Neeld
- Born: 13 July 1971 (age 55)
- Original team: St Joseph's
- Height: 188 cm (6 ft 2 in)
- Weight: 88 kg (194 lb)

Playing career^{1}
| Years | Club | Games (Goals) |
| 1990–1993 | Geelong | 48 (17) |
| 1994–1996 | Richmond | 26 (16) |
| Total | | 74 (33) |

Coaching career
| Years | Club | Games (W–L–D) |
| 2012–2013 | Melbourne | 33 (5–28–0) |
- ^{1} Playing statistics correct to the end of 1996.

Mark Neeld (born 13 July 1971) is a former Australian rules footballer who played with Geelong and Richmond in the Australian Football League (AFL) during the 1990s. He was senior coach of the Melbourne Football Club from 2012 to 2013.

As of 2025, Neeld is CEO of Geelong United Basketball while also coaching the South Barwon Football Club in the Geelong Football League.

== Playing career ==
=== Geelong ===
Neeld, originally from St Joseph's Football Club, started his football career with Geelong. He spent four seasons with Geelong and had his only full season in 1991, when he played 21 games, three of which were finals. Used on both ends of the ground, as both a defender and forward, he kicked three goals in the semi-final against Hawthorn and two goals in Geelong's preliminary final loss to West Coast. Neeld played for Geelong Football Club from 1990 until 1993 for a total of 48 games and kicked a total of 17 goals.

=== Richmond ===
In 1994, Neeld joined Richmond after being traded for the 38th pick of the draft, which Geelong used to recruit David Innella. He retired at the 1996 AFL season. Neeld played for Richmond Football Club from 1994 until 1996 for a total of 26 games and kicked 16 goals.

== Coaching career ==
Shortly after his retirement as an Australian rules football player, he was appointed the new head coach of the Ocean Grove Football Club in the Bellarine Football League, taking over from Brendan McCartney (who had won four premierships in the previous six years, and later coached the Western Bulldogs). As coach of Ocean Grove, Neeld steered the club to a further four successive premierships from 2000 to 2003. He then moved to the higher level Geelong Football League, for a two-year term as coach of perennial finalist, and his junior club, St Joseph's Football Club. After an unsuccessful initial season in 2004, he left with a year remaining on his contract, and spent the next three years as the Western Jets senior coach in the TAC Cup.

=== Collingwood Football Club assistant coach (2008–2011) ===
Neeld was appointed the defensive assistant coach of Collingwood Football Club in 2008 under senior coach Mick Malthouse. His coaching duties changed in 2010, when he was put in charge of Collingwood's midfield.

=== Melbourne Football Club senior coach (2012–2013) ===
On 17 September 2011, it was announced that Neeld had agreed to become the senior coach of the Melbourne Football Club beginning in season 2012 on a three-year contract. Neeld agreed to leave Collingwood immediately, despite the fact that the club was still competing in the finals. Neeld replaced Melbourne Football Club caretaker senior coach Todd Viney, who replaced Dean Bailey, after Bailey was sacked in the middle of the 2011 season.

Upon being appointed Melbourne senior coach, Neeld promised that the Demons would play hard. This promise was fulfilled partially when Melbourne upset 2011 runners-up Collingwood in a NAB Cup match in early 2012. However, when the 2012 home-and-away season became underway in March, the Demons under Neeld were defeated by the Brisbane Lions by 41 points in Round 1. Following this loss, the Demons under Neeld went on a nine-game losing streak which included two losses by more than 100 points, the streak ended in Round 10 with a six-point victory over Essendon. The Demons under Neeld went on to finish the season in third-to-last place, with just four wins from 22 games played.

Despite the off-season acquisitions of several players, such as Shannon Byrnes, Tom Gillies, Chris Dawes, David Rodan and Jack Viney, things did not improve for the Demons under Neeld in the first half of the 2013 season, with just one win in their first 11 games and an average losing margin of 77 points. As a result of this poor start to the 2013 season, during the Demons' mid-season bye on 17 June 2013, Neeld was sacked as Melbourne Football Club senior coach. His sacking came within weeks of the departures of senior Demons' staff members Cameron Schwab and Don McLardy. Neeld was replaced by Demons senior assistant coach, Neil Craig, when he was appointed as caretaker senior coach for the remainder of the 2013 season.

Neeld was sacked by the Demons with just five wins in 33 games coached, for a winning percentage of just 15%.

=== Essendon Football Club assistant coach (2014–2018) ===
Neeld joined the Essendon Football Club in an assistant coaching role as a development coach at the end of 2014. Neeld, however, departed the Essendon Football Club on 14 May 2018 during the middle of the 2018 season.

== Post-AFL career ==
Prior to 2011, Neeld worked for seven years as head of physical education at The Geelong College, later adding a role as multimedia teacher.

In December 2018, Neeld was appointed CEO of Basketball Geelong and the Geelong Supercats. As of October 2025, he is CEO of Geelong United Basketball.

Neeld has been coach of the South Barwon Football Club in the Geelong Football League (GFL) since 2023, taking the club to the GFL grand final in 2023 and 2024.

He also provides commentary for Geelong AFL games on K Rock Football.

== Coaching statistics ==
Legend
| W | Wins | L | Losses | D | Draws | W% | Winning percentage | LP | Ladder position | LT | League teams |

| Season | Team | Games | W | L | D | W % | LP | LT |
|---|---|---|---|---|---|---|---|---|
| 2012 | Melbourne | 22 | 4 | 18 | 0 | 18.2% | 16 | 18 |
| 2013* | Melbourne | 11 | 1 | 10 | 0 | 9.1% | 17 | 18 |
| Career totals | | 33 | 5 | 28 | 0 | 15.2% | | |

* Did not finish off the season as coach
