= Michael Evans (Australian footballer) =

Australian rules footballer

Personal information
- Full name: Michael Evans
- Born: 13 July 1992 (age 34)
- Original teams: Claremont, WAFL
- Draft: 31st overall, 2011; Melbourne
- Height: 180 cm (5 ft 11 in)
- Weight: 75 kg (165 lb)
- Position: Midfielder

Playing career^{1}
Years	Club	Games (Goals)
2011–2014	Melbourne	16 (7)
- ^{1} Playing statistics correct to the end of 2014.

Michael Evans (born 13 July 1992) is a former professional Australian rules footballer who played for the Melbourne Football Club in the Australian Football League (AFL).

He was drafted to Melbourne from the Claremont Football Club in the West Australian Football League with the 31st selection in the 2011 Rookie Draft. He was then elevated to the senior list when Jake Spencer was placed on the long-term injury list.

In May 2011 he was named to make his debut with the Melbourne football club in the Round 9 match against St Kilda at Etihad Stadium. In a disappointing loss for the Demons, Evans had an impressive debut, gathering 27 disposals and seven inside 50s; named as one of Melbourne's best players and his good form was one of the few positives Melbourne could take away from the match.

Evans was delisted in November 2014, he and the club were in discussions in the weeks leading up to his delisting regarding re-drafting him as a rookie due to him still having a year left on his contract, however, he subsequently retired after deciding not to nominate for the draft.

== Statistics ==
Legend
G	Goals	K	Kicks	D	Disposals	T	Tackles
B	Behinds	H	Handballs	M	Marks

Season	Team	No.	Games	Totals							Averages (per game)						
Season	Team	No.	Games	G	B	K	H	D	M	T	G	B	K	H	D	M	T
2011	Melbourne	50	4	0	0	36	23	59	20	17	0.0	0.0	9.0	5.8	14.8	5.0	4.3
2012	Melbourne	50	0	–	–	–	–	–	–	–	–	–	–	–	–	–	–
2013	Melbourne	32	9	6	4	89	51	140	42	22	0.7	0.4	9.9	5.7	15.6	4.7	2.4
2014	Melbourne	32	3	1	1	19	6	25	5	8	0.3	0.3	6.3	2.0	8.3	1.7	2.7
Career			16	7	5	144	80	224	67	47	0.4	0.3	9.0	5.0	14.0	4.2	2.9
