= Brendan Schwab =

Australian sports administrator

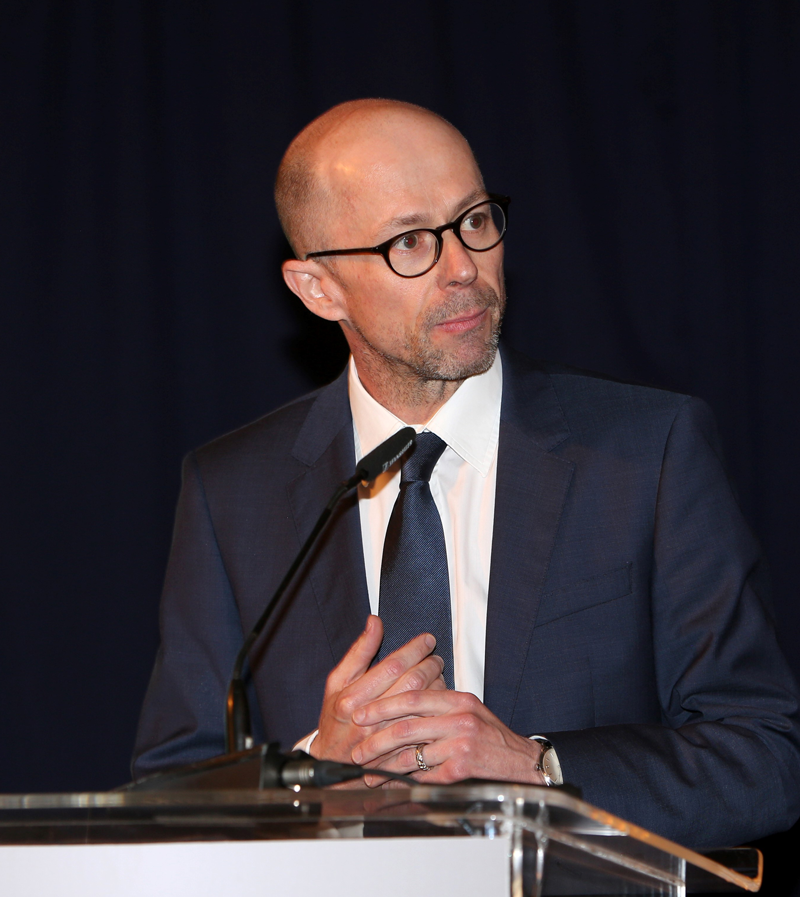
An image of Brendan Schwab presenting at an event.

Brendan Andrew Schwab AM [ˈbɹendən ʃwaːb] (born 10 March 1968) is an Australian sports administrator, trade union official and lawyer. He served as executive director of the World Players Association (WPA), a sector of UNI Global Union, a global union federation based in Nyon, Switzerland. He co-founded Professional Footballers Australia (PFA) and served as its lawyer, chief executive and chair.

== Life and career ==
Schwab is the son of the late Alan Schwab, an Australian sports administrator and former Australian Football League executive commissioner, and the brother of Cameron Schwab, a former chief executive officer of the Richmond, Melbourne and Fremantle football clubs. He graduated from the Melbourne Law School in 1992.

=== PFA ===
As an industrial relations and employment lawyer, Schwab partnered with Socceroos and National Soccer League (NSL) player Kimon Taliadoros to establish the PFA. The PFA secured a standardised player contract and, through the then Australian Industrial Relations Commission (AIRC), pursued the abolition of the domestic transfer system. In June 1995, the abolition of the domestic transfer system was recommended by both the AIRC and the Environment, Recreation, Communications and Arts Committee of the Australian Senate following an inquiry into Australian soccer.

Schwab led the PFA's research and advocacy for the establishment of a new national competition to replace the NSL, including the proposal titled "For the Fans". In 2003, he was appointed by Football Federation Australia (FFA) Chairman Frank Lowy to a task force which recommended the creation of a new national competition. In 2004, FFA launched the A-League Men.

Following the establishment of the A-League Men, there was public debate regarding player payments and the league's financial model. In December 2011, Warwick Smith, the chairman of the Australian Sports Commission, released a review into Australian soccer which concluded that "salaries had increased at an unsustainable rate" and that "players [were] paid around 40 per cent of income generated by the A-League, compared to approximately 20 per cent paid in the AFL, NRL and Super Rugby." The PFA rejected this aspect of the review, with Schwab describing it as a "fundamental error".

In 2010, the PFA and FFA negotiated a collective bargaining agreement that saw the introduction of full-time contracts for the Matildas in time for the 2011 FIFA Women's World Cup.

At the 2010 FIFA World Cup, the Socceroos were reported to be among the best paid teams at the tournament under the collective bargaining agreement between the PFA and FFA.

In 2012, Schwab announced he was stepping down as PFA Chief Executive after two decades with the organisation, while retaining responsibility for collective bargaining. Schwab denied that tensions with FFA and club owners informed his decision.

=== FIFPRO ===
Schwab was appointed the inaugural chair of FIFPRO Asia/Oceania. From 2008, he supported closer engagement with the Asian Football Confederation and the development of player associations across the region. He also called on FIFA to ensure international labour standards were upheld in relation to migrant workers connected to the 2022 FIFA World Cup in Qatar.

=== Australian Player Associations ===
Schwab served as general secretary of the Australian Athletes’ Alliance (AAA), the peak body representing Australia's player associations. He represented the AAA in Senate inquiries into the expansion of integrity powers held by sports bodies and their implications for athlete rights. Schwab publicly criticised aspects of the World Anti-Doping Agency (WADA) framework and its impact on athletes, including in the wake of the Essendon Football Club supplements scandal. In 2014, he argued that Australian sports should develop anti-doping policy in partnership with player associations, citing approaches used in the United States.

In 2012, Schwab and academic Braham Dabscheck advised the Rugby League Players’ Association during its collective bargaining negotiations with the Australian Rugby League Commission. In 1999, Schwab acted as secretary to a review of the AFL Players’ Association conducted by Dabscheck.

=== WPA ===
The World Players Association (WPA) represents more than 85,000 athletes through 138 player associations in over 70 countries across 17 sports. Schwab served as executive director of the WPA for nearly a decade, concluding his tenure in June 2023.

During Schwab's tenure, the WPA's work included coordination among player associations during the COVID-19 pandemic and engagement on athlete rights and human rights issues in global sport. The WPA coordinated efforts among player unions in relation to return-to-play negotiations during the pandemic. It also engaged with international bodies including the International Olympic Committee (IOC) and the International Labour Organization (ILO). The WPA was among the organisations involved in the establishment of the Sport and Rights Alliance (SRA) and the Centre for Sport and Human Rights.

In 2017, the WPA launched the "Universal Declaration of Player Rights" at a press conference at the NFL Players Association, describing it as a proposed international benchmark for athlete rights. The IOC later developed its own "Athlete Rights and Responsibilities Declaration", which was endorsed at an IOC Session in Buenos Aires in 2018. Schwab and the Sport and Rights Alliance criticised aspects of the IOC declaration and called for stronger protections for athlete rights.

== Human rights advocacy ==
Schwab has worked on human rights issues in sport, including matters involving athletes such as Bilqis Abdul-Qaadir and Hakeem al-Araibi. He has also been associated with work alongside Khalida Popal and members of the Afghan women's national football team.

Schwab advocated for equal prize money between the men's and women's FIFA World Cups, and has published academic articles on athlete activism and the responsibilities of international sporting bodies in relation to human rights.

== Honours and recognition ==
In 2022, Schwab was inducted into the Football Australia Hall of Fame.

He was appointed a Member of the Order of Australia in the 2026 Australia Day Honours for "significant service to professional sport as a lawyer, and as an advocate for athlete's rights".
