= Peter Jackson (Australian businessman) =

Australian businessman

Peter Jackson (born 1953) is an Australian businessman who was the chief executive officer of the Essendon and Melbourne Football Clubs in the Australian Football League (AFL).

== Administrative career ==
=== Essendon (1996–2009) ===
Jackson was the CEO of the Essendon Football Club between 1996 and 2009, during which the club won a record-equaling 16th premiership and was credited with strengthening the club's finances. He was also involved in the process of replacing the club's long-serving coach Kevin Sheedy with Matthew Knights at the end of the 2007 AFL season.

=== Melbourne (2013–2018) ===
Jackson was appointed as the CEO of the Melbourne Football Club in May 2013, overseeing a significant restructure and rebuilding of the club, including the sacking of coach Mark Neeld and the appointment of Paul Roos as the club's senior coach.

Jackson departed Melbourne at the end of the 2018 season, by which point the club had returned to stability both on and off the field, with an overhauled playing list and a return to the finals under second-year coach Simon Goodwin.

== Personal life ==
Jackson is the cousin of former AFL CEO Wayne Jackson.
