= Jack Fitzpatrick (footballer) =

Australian rules footballer (born 1991)

Personal information
- Full name: Jack Fitzpatrick
- Born: 26 June 1991 (age 35)
- Original team: Western Jets
- Draft: No. 50, 2009 national draft
- Debut: Round 24, 2011, Melbourne vs. Port Adelaide, at Adelaide Oval
- Height: 200 cm (6 ft 7 in)
- Weight: 96 kg (212 lb)
- Position: Ruckman / Forward

Playing career^{1}
| Years | Club | Games (Goals) |
| 2010–2015 | Melbourne | 22 (24) |
| 2016–2017 | Hawthorn | 4 (3) |
| Total | | 26 (27) |
- ^{1} Playing statistics correct to the end of 2017.

Jack Fitzpatrick (born 26 June 1991) is a former professional Australian rules footballer who played for the Melbourne Football Club and Hawthorn Football Club in the Australian Football League (AFL).

Fitzpatrick was selected with the 50th overall pick in the 2009 AFL draft by the Melbourne Demons. He was recruited from the Western Jets in the TAC Cup competition and attended MacKillop Catholic Regional College in Werribee.

== AFL career ==
After kicking four goals in a Victorian Football League match for Casey, Fitzpatrick made his AFL debut in the final round of the 2011 season. He kicked a goal in the match. Jack played the last game of the 2012 AFL season against Fremantle kicking 2 goals. He suffered from chronic fatigue syndrome from childhood, hence the inconsistency early on. A diagnosis of type 1 diabetes at 21 years of age has also added to his challenges.

Fitzpatrick showed improvement during the 2013 AFL season, he played every match from rounds 10 - 21 for Melbourne, ranking No 1 at the club for scoreboard impact, kicking 15 goals in 11 games.

From 2014 he has failed to make an impact at senior level managing 8 games in two years.

He was delisted by Melbourne in September 2015, however, he was recruited by the Hawthorn Football Club through a trade in October.

Fitzpatrick had one year at Hawthorn, he played well in the preseason competition but hurt his knee in the final game. After missing the start of the season due to injury, Fitzpatrick started a return to form in the VFL with Box Hill. In his fifth game back from injury he suffered a head blow and the resultant concussion sidelined him for two months. Finally an opportunity opened for him in the final round to make his Hawthorn debut, he kicked a match-turning goal which saw them defeat Collingwood by one point and secure third place on the ladder. He played in the two final matches, both of which Hawthorn lost. At the conclusion of the 2016 season, he was delisted by Hawthorn.

He was subsequently re-drafted by Hawthorn in the 2017 rookie draft. He played one game but received a head knock that caused concussion. On 21 August 2017, Fitzpatrick announced his immediate retirement from AFL football due to ongoing concussion issues.

== Statistics ==
Legend
| G | Goals | K | Kicks | D | Disposals | T | Tackles |
| B | Behinds | H | Handballs | M | Marks | H/O | Hit-outs |

| Season | Team | No. | Games | Totals | | | | | | | | Averages (per game) | | | | | | | | Votes |
| Season | Team | No. | Games | G | B | K | H | D | M | T | H/O | G | B | K | H | D | M | T | H/O | Votes |
|---|---|---|---|---|---|---|---|---|---|---|---|---|---|---|---|---|---|---|---|---|
| 2010 | Melbourne | 48 | 0 | — | — | — | — | — | — | — | — | — | — | — | — | — | — | — | — | 0 |
| 2011 | Melbourne | 48 | 1 | 1 | 2 | 8 | 3 | 11 | 4 | 1 | 2 | 1.0 | 2.0 | 8.0 | 3.0 | 11.0 | 4.0 | 1.0 | 2.0 | 0 |
| 2012 | Melbourne | 48 | 2 | 2 | 0 | 6 | 5 | 11 | 1 | 3 | 2 | 1.0 | 0.0 | 3.0 | 2.5 | 5.5 | 0.5 | 1.5 | 1.0 | 0 |
| 2013 | Melbourne | 48 | 11 | 15 | 9 | 74 | 35 | 109 | 46 | 17 | 72 | 1.4 | 0.8 | 6.7 | 3.2 | 9.9 | 4.2 | 1.5 | 6.5 | 0 |
| 2014 | Melbourne | 48 | 5 | 4 | 1 | 19 | 18 | 37 | 15 | 6 | 17 | 0.8 | 0.2 | 3.8 | 3.6 | 7.4 | 3.0 | 1.2 | 3.4 | 0 |
| 2015 | Melbourne | 48 | 3 | 2 | 0 | 19 | 9 | 28 | 11 | 3 | 7 | 0.7 | 0.0 | 6.3 | 3.0 | 9.3 | 3.7 | 1.0 | 2.3 | 0 |
| 2016 | Hawthorn | 32 | 3 | 3 | 3 | 23 | 11 | 34 | 8 | 8 | 29 | 1.0 | 1.0 | 7.7 | 3.7 | 11.3 | 2.7 | 2.7 | 9.7 | 0 |
| 2017 | Hawthorn | 32 | 1 | 0 | 0 | 3 | 8 | 11 | 4 | 0 | 13 | 0.0 | 0.0 | 3.0 | 8.0 | 11.0 | 4.0 | 0.0 | 13.0 | 0 |
| Career | | | 26 | 27 | 15 | 152 | 89 | 241 | 89 | 38 | 142 | 1.0 | 0.6 | 5.8 | 3.4 | 9.3 | 3.4 | 1.5 | 5.5 | 0 |
