= Lewis Johnston =

Australian rules footballer (born 1991)

Personal information
- Born: 3 March 1991 (age 35); Port Pirie, South Australia
- Original team: North Adelaide (SANFL)
- Draft: 12th overall, 2008; Sydney Swans
- Height: 192 cm (6 ft 4 in)
- Weight: 91 kg (201 lb)

Playing career^{1}
Years	Club	Games (Goals)
2009–2011	Sydney	2 (1)
2012–2014	Adelaide	8 (15)
Total		10 (16)
- ^{1} Playing statistics correct to the end of 2014.

Lewis Johnston (born 3 March 1991) is an Australian rules footballer who played for the Sydney Swans and Adelaide Football Club in the Australian Football League (AFL).

== AFL career ==
=== Sydney ===
Originally from Port Pirie, South Australia, Johnston played junior football for North Adelaide in the South Australian National Football League (SANFL) before being drafted to Sydney with the 12th selection in the 2008 AFL draft.

, Johnston was seen as a future key-position forward due to his height, strength in the air and his ground play. Johnston was named at centre-half forward in the All-Australian team following the 2008 AFL Under 18 Championships. A foot injury curtailed his 2009 AFL season and Johnston finally made his senior AFL debut in round 10 2011, against North Melbourne,

=== Adelaide ===
In October 2011 Johnston was traded back to his home state to the Adelaide in exchange for Tony Armstrong. He made his debut for Adelaide in round 20 of the 2012 AFL season against Fremantle.

In 2013 Johnston was not selected to play for Adelaide until round 19 against Port Adelaide. In the last Showdown to be played at AAMI Stadium, Johnston kicked 4 goals. Due to a number of injuries his career was cut short, and was delisted by Adelaide at the conclusion of the 2014 AFL season.
