= Cameron Schwab =

Australian sports administrator

Cameron Schwab (born December 4, 1963) is an Australian sports administrator.

Schwab became the youngest chief executive officer (CEO) of a club in Victorian Football League history when he joined Richmond in 1988. Early in the 1994 AFL season he resigned after some very poor performances by the Richmond team, before becoming a consultant to the new Fremantle Football Club's entry into the AFL. He then joined Melbourne where he worked as a recruiter, before becoming chief executive in 1997 under the presidency of Joseph Gutnick. He resigned in 1999 after a disagreement with Gutnick following a major salary cap breach.

In 2001 he joined Fremantle as chief executive officer, after the club had experienced their worst ever season, sacking their coach mid-year and winning only two games for the year. He remained there for seven years, vastly improving the club's finances.

Schwab returned to Melbourne, and in 2008 he was persuaded by club president Jim Stynes to return as chief executive officer. Whilst the club performed well off the field, the club's on-field performances remained poor and the club was investigated for tanking. Schwab was on the verge of being sacked in mid-2011, but, in a surprise move, had his contract extended by twelve months on the same weekend the club suffered a near-record 186-point loss to Geelong in round 19. Then-president Jim Stynes said that the decision to retain Schwab was "coincidental and unrelated to the weekend's game".

Melbourne started the 2013 season very badly, losing its opening two matches by a total of 227 points, including a 148-point loss to Essendon in the second round. This put Schwab under even greater pressure. On 9 April 2013, Schwab was asked by the club president, Don McLardy, to resign as CEO, which he did.

Schwab is the son of Alan Schwab, who was a prominent sports administrator and VFL commissioner, and the brother of Brendan Schwab, who is the chairman of FIFPro Asia and the former chief executive officer of the Australian Professional Footballers' Association.
