= Jeremy Nichols =

Australian rules footballer (born 1965)

Personal information
- Full name: Jeremy Nichols
- Born: 4 November 1965 (age 60)
- Original team: Melbourne Grammar
- Height: 178 cm (5 ft 10 in)
- Weight: 74 kg (163 lb)

Playing career^{1}
Years	Club	Games (Goals)
1985–1986	Melbourne	4 (2)
- ^{1} Playing statistics correct to the end of 1986.

Jeremy Nichols (born 4 November 1965) is a former Australian rules footballer who played with Melbourne in the Victorian Football League (VFL).
