= Troy Davis (Australian footballer) =

Golf Caddy

Personal information
- Full name: Troy Davis
- Born: 10 June 1992 (age 34)
- Original team: Geelong Falcons (TAC Cup)
- Draft: No. 50, 2010 National Draft
- Height: 192 cm (6 ft 4 in)
- Weight: 96 kg (212 lb)
- Position: Forward

Playing career^{1}
Years	Club	Games (Goals)
2011–2013	Melbourne	2 (1)
- ^{1} Playing statistics correct to the end of 2013.

Troy Davis (born 10 June 1992) is a former professional Australian rules footballer who played for the Melbourne Football Club in the Australian Football League (AFL).

== AFL career ==
Davis was recruited from the Geelong Falcons in the TAC Cup with pick 50 in the 2010 National Draft as a tall defender. However, he missed most of the 2011 season due to an overactive thyroid.

Davis did not play a senior game in 2011 or 2012, instead playing all of his games with Melbourne's reserves, the Casey Scorpions, in the Victorian Football League.

Davis moved back and forth between the forward and back line for Casey in 2013, until he was called up late in the season where he was used as a forward. He made his AFL debut against the Gold Coast in round 20; he played again the next week against Fremantle where he kicked his first AFL goal, then he was subsequently dropped.

Davis was delisted at the end of the 2013 season, however, he signed with Casey where he continues to play in 2014. He later moved back to his junior club Kerang.

== Personal life ==
Davis married his long time partner, Kristi Bilkey in February 2026
