= Colin Garland =

Australian rules footballer

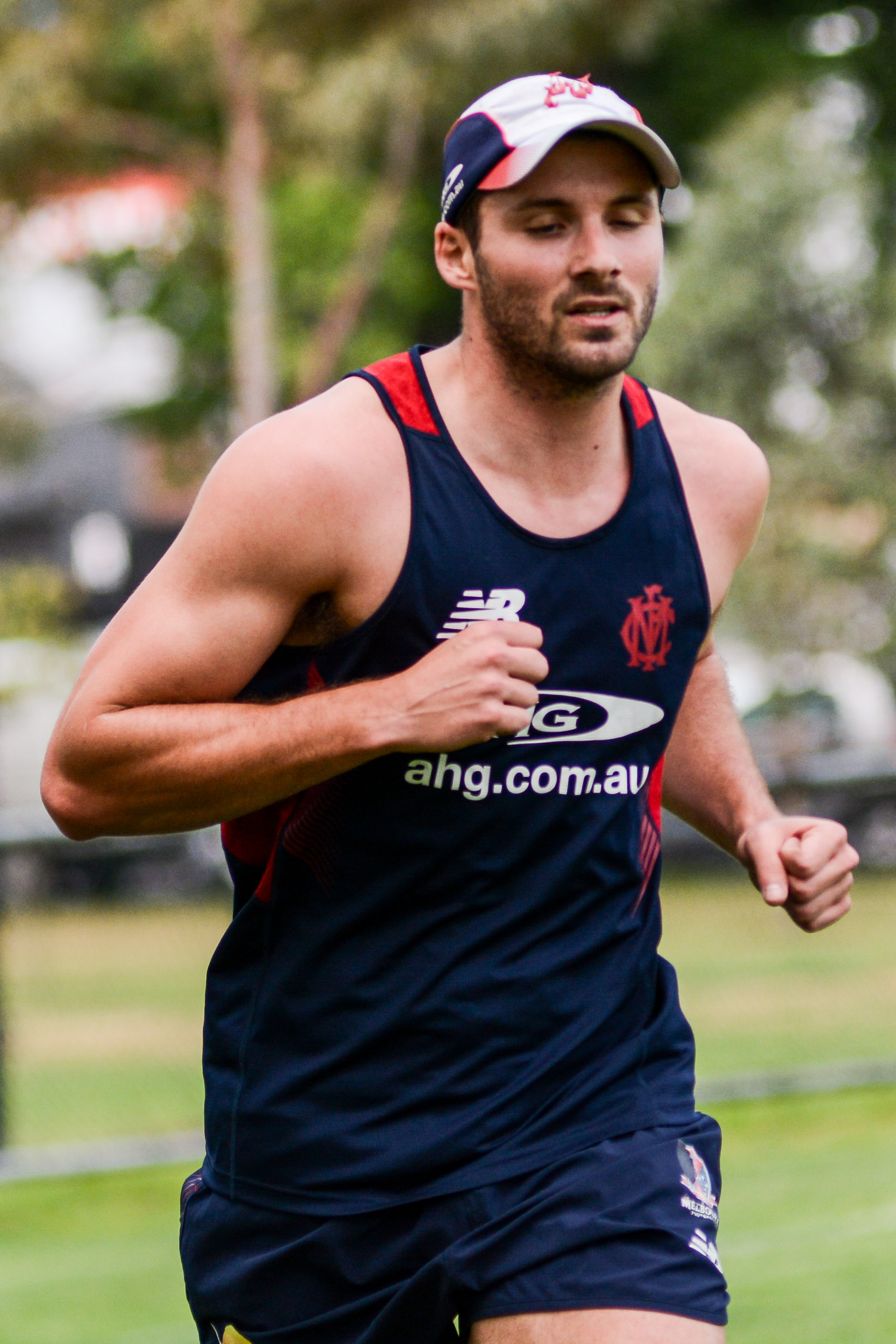
- Garland training with Melbourne in November 2015

Personal information
- Full name: Colin Garland
- Born: 28 April 1988 (age 38); Tasmania
- Original team: Tassie Mariners (TAC Cup)
- Draft: No. 46, 2006 national draft
- Debut: Round 5, 2007, Melbourne vs. Sydney, at SCG
- Height: 192 cm (6 ft 4 in)
- Weight: 92 kg (203 lb)
- Position: Defender

Playing career^{1}
Years	Club	Games (Goals)
2007–2017	Melbourne	141 (16)
- ^{1} Playing statistics correct to the end of 2017.

Career highlights
- 2008 AFL Rising Star nominee; SFL premiership player: 2025

Colin Garland (born 28 April 1988) is a former professional Australian rules footballer who played for the Melbourne Football Club in the Australian Football League (AFL).

Beginning his playing years at the North Hobart in the SFL in Tasmania, Garland was recruited by the Demons from the TAC Cup side Tassie Mariners at pick No. 46 in the 2006 AFL draft.

Playing for the Demons as an athletic key position player, Garland wore the No. 20 guernsey. He became the first player since the late Troy Broadbridge to wear this jumper, after it was retired for the previous two years (2005–2006).

Garland received a NAB Rising Star nomination (round 14, 2008) for his consistent efforts playing in the Demons backline.

Garland announced his retirement from the game on 19 October 2017, after missing the entire season due to a knee injury.

Garland returned to his former club North Hobart during the 2018 TSL season.

Garland has also played and been an assistant coach at the Clarence Football Club in the TSL.

== Statistics ==
Statistics are correct to the end of the 2017 season

Legend
G	Goals	K	Kicks	D	Disposals	T	Tackles
B	Behinds	H	Handballs	M	Marks

Season	Team	No.	Games	Totals							Averages (per game)						
Season	Team	No.	Games	G	B	K	H	D	M	T	G	B	K	H	D	M	T
2007	Melbourne	20	2	0	1	3	6	9	1	3	0.0	0.5	1.5	3.0	4.5	0.5	1.5
2008	Melbourne	20	17	2	1	120	84	204	76	23	0.1	0.1	7.1	4.9	12.0	4.5	1.4
2009	Melbourne	20	1	0	0	12	7	19	5	3	0.0	0.0	12.0	7.0	19.0	5.0	3.0
2010	Melbourne	20	20	1	0	174	121	295	73	66	0.1	0.0	8.7	6.1	14.8	3.7	3.3
2011	Melbourne	20	18	1	1	167	100	267	74	42	0.1	0.1	9.3	5.6	14.8	4.1	2.3
2012	Melbourne	20	22	8	6	203	78	281	98	73	0.4	0.3	9.2	3.5	12.8	4.5	3.3
2013	Melbourne	20	21	2	1	221	108	329	89	76	0.1	0.0	10.5	5.1	15.7	4.2	3.6
2014	Melbourne	20	14	1	2	125	54	179	59	43	0.1	0.1	8.9	3.9	12.8	4.2	3.1
2015	Melbourne	20	20	1	2	194	85	279	83	85	0.1	0.1	9.7	4.3	14.0	4.2	4.3
2016	Melbourne	20	6	0	0	36	31	67	19	19	0.0	0.0	6.0	5.2	11.2	3.2	3.2
2017	Melbourne	20	0	–	–	–	–	–	–	–	–	–	–	–	–	–	–
Career			141	16	14	1255	674	1929	577	416	0.1	0.1	8.9	4.8	13.7	4.1	3.0
