= Jake Spencer (footballer) =

Australian rules footballer

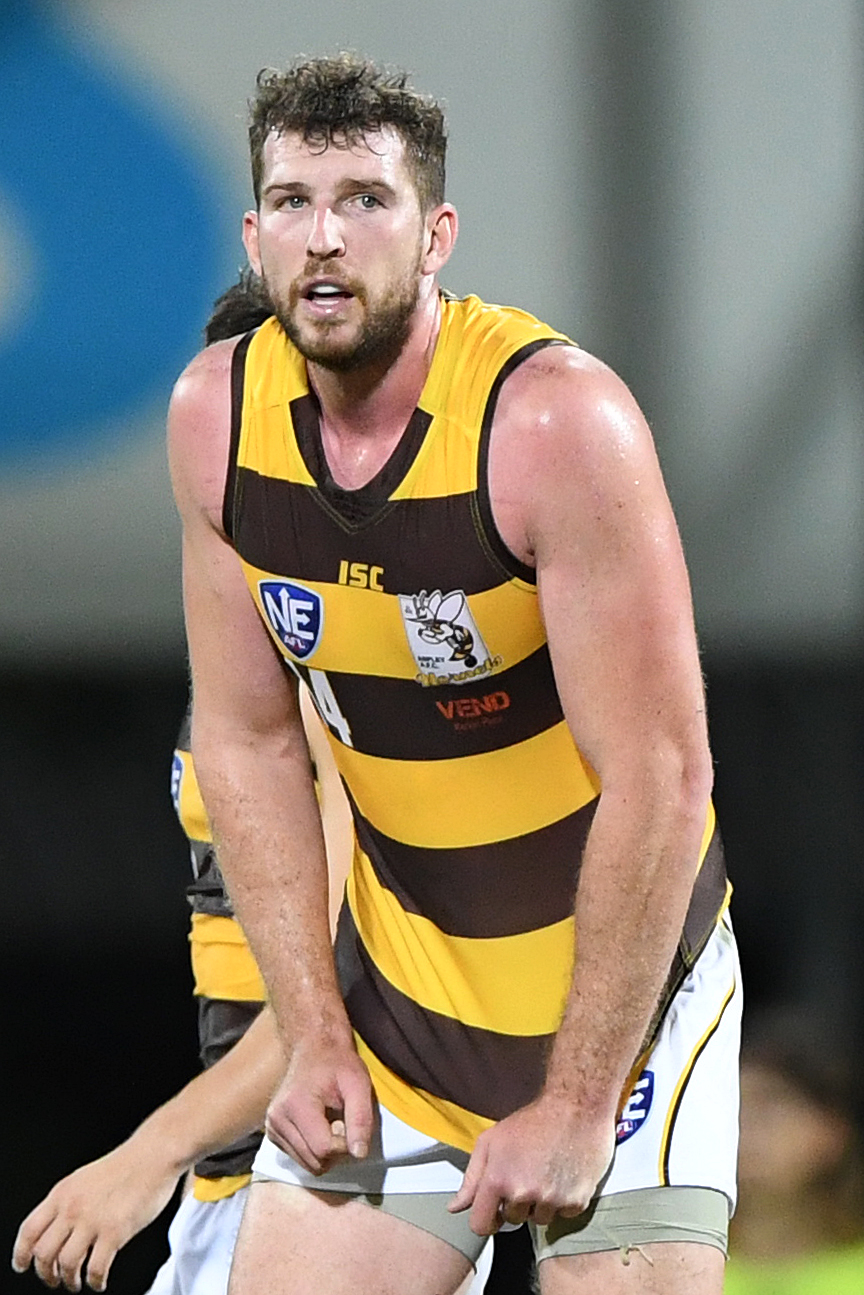
- Spencer in May 2019

Personal information
- Full name: Jake Spencer
- Born: 9 October 1989 (age 37)
- Original team: Redland (QAFL)
- Draft: No. 35, 2008 rookie draft
- Debut: Round 1, 2009, Melbourne vs. North Melbourne, at MCG
- Height: 203 cm (6 ft 8 in)
- Weight: 105 kg (231 lb)
- Position: Ruckman

Playing career^{1}
Years	Club	Games (Goals)
2008–2017	Melbourne	38 (8)
- ^{1} Playing statistics correct to the end of 2017.

Jake Spencer (born 9 October 1989) is a former professional Australian rules footballer who played for the Melbourne Football Club in the Australian Football League (AFL). Spencer, a ruckman, is the first person from Townsville to be drafted and play in the AFL.

== Early life ==
Spencer moved to Townsville at age 18 years of age where he played basketball, becoming an under 18 player. In 2003 he began to play Australian rules football and in 2007 he moved to Brisbane because:

"I couldn't really get noticed in Townsville so I moved to Brisbane to get a better standard of football. If I do become the first (Townsville product) to play AFL I would be very proud of it."

He completed his schooling at Brisbane Boys College and his performances with Redland Bombers in the AFL Queensland State League gained the attention of several AFL talent scouts. Spencer's uncle is Tony Kelly, chairman of the Brisbane Lions football club, one of the teams that scouted Spencer but did not select him.

== AFL career ==
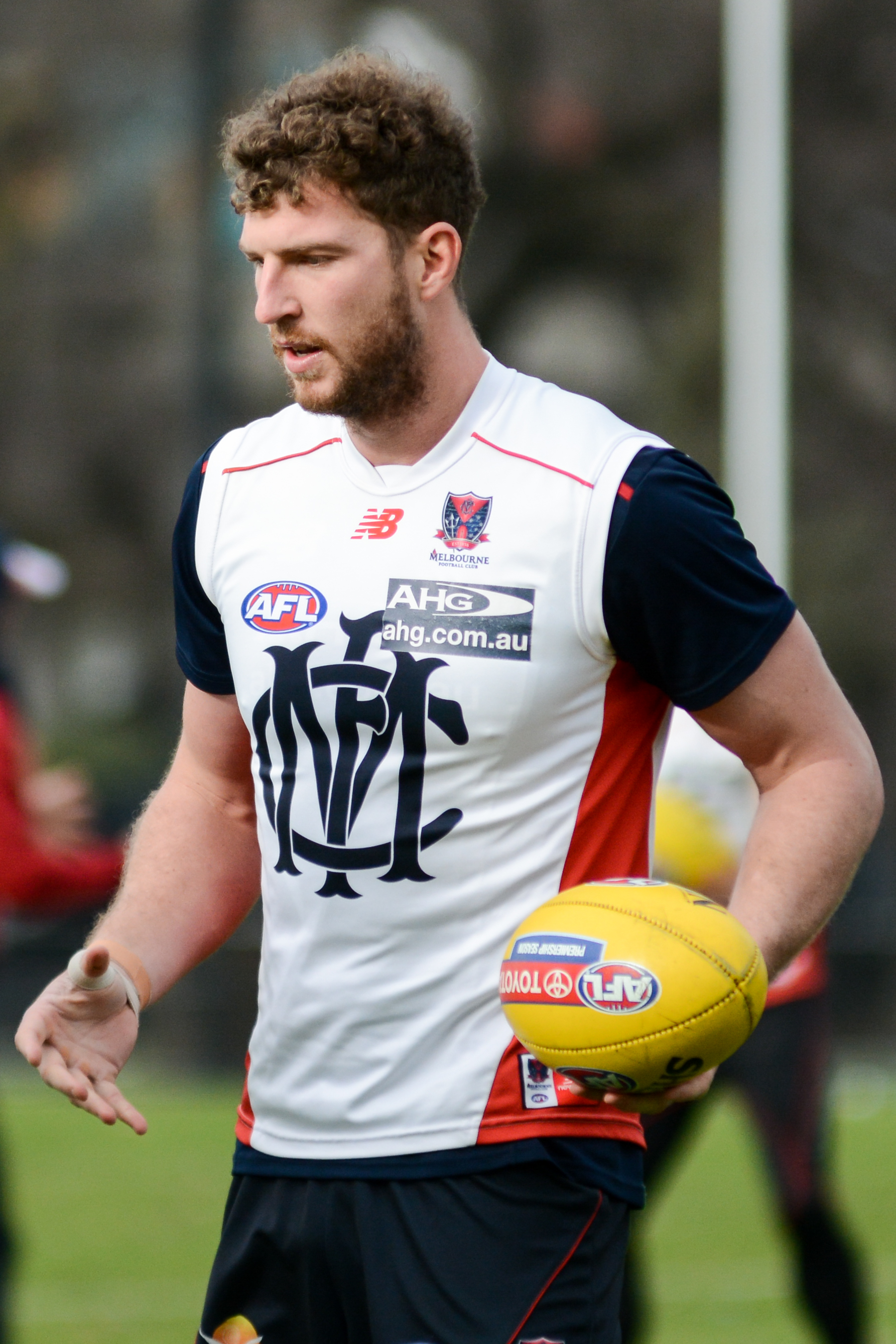
Spencer at training in July 2015

=== Rookie list (2008-2010) ===
Melbourne used its 35th selection in the 2008 Rookie Draft to recruit Spencer in 2008. His first season was spent playing in the Victorian Football League with affiliate club Sandringham where he played seven games at reserves level and 10 in the seniors. He made his NAB Cup debut on 21 February 2009 to encouraging reviews. He played his first AFL game in Round 1 2009 and managed six games for the season. After two senior games in 2010, an injury in Round 14 prematurely ended his season. At the conclusion of the 2010 season, Spencer was promoted from the rookie list to the senior list with the 96th selection in the 2010 AFL draft.

=== Senior list (2011-2017) ===
In May 2011 Spencer suffered a season-ending knee injury, rupturing his anterior cruciate ligament while playing for VFL affiliate the Casey. He returned to the VFL in 2012 and started to improve his form. In 2013, he played consistently in the VFL and was named an emergency in the AFL side a number of times, but wasn't named in the 22-man side until round 13.

Throughout his AFL career, Spencer struggled to get a consistent spot in Melbourne's side, as Melbourne preferred to play only one ruckman and Max Gawn began to emerge as a great ruckman. In 2016, he wasn't able to play a single game for the Demons and remained a back-up ruckman for the club. He was delisted at the conclusion of the 2017 season.

== Statistics ==
Statistics are correct to the end of the 2017 season

Legend
G	Goals	K	Kicks	D	Disposals	T	Tackles
B	Behinds	H	Handballs	M	Marks	H/O	Hit-outs

Season	Team	No.	Games	Totals								Averages (per game)							
Season	Team	No.	Games	G	B	K	H	D	M	T	H/O	G	B	K	H	D	M	T	H/O
2008	Melbourne	42	0	—	—	—	—	—	—	—	—	—	—	—	—	—	—	—	—
2009	Melbourne	42	6	0	1	14	31	45	18	11	67	0.0	0.2	2.3	5.2	7.5	3.0	1.8	11.2
2010	Melbourne	42	2	0	0	2	8	10	4	2	24	0.0	0.0	1.0	4.0	5.0	2.0	1.0	12.0
2011	Melbourne	42	0	—	—	—	—	—	—	—	—	—	—	—	—	—	—	—	—
2012	Melbourne	42	8	2	0	28	46	74	20	30	167	0.3	0.0	3.5	5.8	9.3	2.5	3.8	20.1
2013	Melbourne	42	8	1	3	23	57	80	25	19	213	0.1	0.4	2.9	7.1	10.0	3.1	2.4	26.6
2014	Melbourne	42	5	0	0	13	27	40	9	18	143	0.0	0.0	2.6	5.4	8.0	1.8	3.6	28.6
2015	Melbourne	42	7	3	0	20	34	54	9	35	173	0.4	0.0	2.8	4.9	7.7	1.3	5.0	24.7
2016	Melbourne	33	0	—	—	—	—	—	—	—	—	—	—	—	—	—	—	—	—
2017	Melbourne	33	2	2	0	7	10	17	7	5	28	1.0	0.0	3.5	5.0	8.5	3.5	2.5	14.0
Career			38	8	4	107	213	320	89	120	815	0.2	0.1	2.8	5.6	8.4	2.3	3.1	21.4
