= Shannon Byrnes =

Australian rules footballer (born 1984)

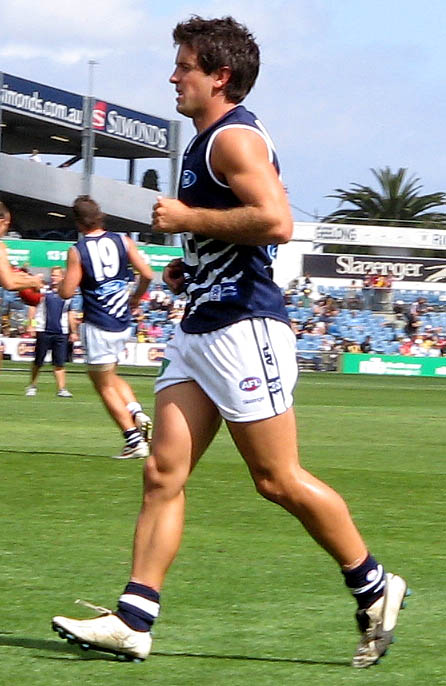
- Shannon Byrnes warming up during the Round 1 of the 2007 NAB Cup, Skilled Stadium, Geelong, Australia.

Personal information
- Born: 7 April 1984 (age 42); Victoria, Australia
- Original team: Shepparton / Murray U18
- Height: 175 cm (5 ft 9 in)
- Weight: 77 kg (170 lb)
- Position: Wing/forward flank

Playing career^{1}
Years	Club	Games (Goals)
2004–2012	Geelong	108 (100)
2013–2014	Melbourne	23 (17)
Total		131 (117)
- ^{1} Playing statistics correct to the end of 2014.

Career highlights
- AFL: 2× AFL premiership player: 2007, 2009; National Rising Star nomination 2005; Geelong: Third reserves best & fairest 2003; Premierships: NAB Cup 2006, 2009; VFL Premiership 2012; AFL Premierships 2007, 2009; Division 1 WRFL 2016,2017,2018,2019

Shannon Byrnes (born 7 April 1984) is a former Australian rules footballer who last played for the Melbourne Football Club in the Australian Football League (AFL) after a ten-year career with the Geelong Football Club. He is currently a development manager at the Geelong Cats Football Club.

== Career ==
Byrnes was recruited from the Murray Bushrangers and was the last draftee selected by the Geelong Football Club in the AFL rookie draft in 2002. He was given the guernsey number 46, but changed it to 17 at the start of the 2005 season. Byrnes also wore the #10 guernsey when he co-captained the Murray Bushrangers.

As a second year rookie, he was promoted to Geelong's senior list for the remainder of the 2004 season, replacing James Kelly who was out for the rest of the year after breaking his leg against the West Coast Eagles. Byrnes was used effectively off the bench mainly in his first 2 seasons on the senior list, and earnt a rising star nomination in 2005 with a 24 possession and 2 goal game against the West Coast Eagles at Subiaco.

The speedy-left footer had an inconsistent season in 2006, with fluctuating form, and the inability to break into a strong team seeing him being put in and out of the playing squad. In 2007, Byrnes very strong form at VFL level could not be ignored, he found his way in to the senior team at the right end of the season and was a part of the 2007 Premiership team, picking up 14 disposals and kicking one goal.

After a lacklustre season in 2008 and missing out on playing finals, he produced the best year of his career to date in 2009 kicking 32 goals 11 behinds for the season. He cemented a spot in the team, missing only two games due to injury, and was picked to play in the 2009 AFL Grand Final, where he had 16 possessions, kicked one goal. He played a pivotal role in the last quarter collecting important possessions and making decisive tackles while out running his opponents when the game was on the line. This performance propelled him toward becoming a two-time premiership player. He backed up this year with another very good year in 2010 kicking 35 goals for the season.

In 2011 he only played five games, in an injury plagued year missing most of the season due to knee and calf injuries. He was selected as an emergency for the 2011 AFL Grand Final, but despite there being some injury concerns over Steve Johnson, he was not called up to the final team.

Byrnes announced his retirement on 30 July 2014, effective immediately.

== Statistics ==
Legend
G	Goals	K	Kicks	D	Disposals	T	Tackles
B	Behinds	H	Handballs	M	Marks
#	Played in that season's premiership team

Season	Team	No.	Games	Totals							Averages (per game)						
Season	Team	No.	Games	G	B	K	H	D	M	T	G	B	K	H	D	M	T
2004	Geelong	46	4	1	3	22	13	35	13	15	0.3	0.8	5.5	3.3	8.8	3.3	3.8
2005	Geelong	17	19	8	13	150	95	245	56	47	0.4	0.7	7.9	5.0	12.9	2.9	2.5
2006	Geelong	17	10	3	11	100	47	147	58	26	0.3	1.1	10.0	4.7	14.7	5.8	2.6
2007^{#}	Geelong	17	12	7	11	90	107	197	53	40	0.6	0.9	7.5	8.9	16.4	4.4	3.3
2008	Geelong	17	9	8	10	78	65	143	35	28	0.9	1.1	8.7	7.2	15.9	3.9	3.1
2009^{#}	Geelong	17	22	32	11	196	212	408	111	64	1.5	0.5	8.9	9.6	18.5	5.0	2.9
2010	Geelong	17	23	35	20	199	195	394	109	65	1.5	0.9	8.7	8.5	17.1	4.7	2.8
2011	Geelong	17	5	5	2	31	16	47	8	5	1.0	0.4	6.2	3.2	9.4	1.6	1.0
2012	Geelong	17	4	1	2	18	22	40	10	12	0.3	0.5	4.5	5.5	10.0	2.5	3.0
2013	Melbourne	10	17	12	11	127	116	243	62	38	0.7	0.6	7.5	6.8	14.3	3.6	2.2
2014	Melbourne	10	6	5	3	28	37	65	11	16	0.8	0.5	4.7	6.2	10.8	1.8	2.7
Career			131	117	97	1039	925	1964	526	356	0.9	0.7	7.9	7.1	15.0	4.0	2.7
