= Terry Milera =

Australian rules footballer

Personal information
- Full name: Terry Milera
- Born: 8 January 1988 (age 38); Ceduna, South Australia
- Original team: Port Adelaide (SANFL)
- Draft: 2011 NAB AFL Draft, Greater Western Sydney; Traded for ND pick #20, St Kilda
- Height: 185 cm (6 ft 1 in)
- Weight: 68 kg (150 lb)

Playing career^{1}
Years	Club	Games (Goals)
2012–2014	St Kilda	30 (31)
- ^{1} Playing statistics correct to the end of 2014.

Terry Milera is a former professional Australian rules footballer who played for the St Kilda Football Club in the Australian Football League from 2012 to 2014.

== Playing career ==
Milera was recruited by Greater Western Sydney and then ontraded to St Kilda during the 2011 Trade Week, along with Ahmed Saad and pick 25 in exchange for pick 20. Milera signed a two-year contract with St Kilda. He made his debut in Round 1 of the 2012 home and away season against Port Adelaide.

Milera was delisted at the conclusion of the 2014 AFL season.

Milera later played for Glenelg Football Club in the South Australian National Football League from 2015 to 2018.

== Personal life ==
Milera's stepson Nasiah Wanganeen-Milera was drafted with pick 11 to St Kilda in the 2021 AFL national draft. His wife Rachael is the sister of AFL Hall of Fame inductee Gavin Wanganeen.
