= 2016 Melbourne Football Club season =

Melbourne Football Club
2016 season
- President: Glen Bartlett^{(3rd season)}
- Coach: Paul Roos^{(3rd season)}
- Captains: Nathan Jones^{(3rd season)}
- Home grounds: MCG^{(100,024 capacity)}
- Pre-season: 3 wins, 0 losses
- AFL season: 11th
- Finals series: DNQ
- Best and fairest: Jack Viney
- Leading goalkicker: Jesse Hogan^{(41 goals)}
- Highest home attendance: 60,158^{(round 12 vs. Collingwood)}
- Lowest home attendance: 5,146^{(round 10 vs. Port Adelaide)}
- Average home attendance: 31,326
- Club membership: 39,146^{(▲3,193 / ▲8.88%)}

The 2016 Melbourne Football Club season was the club's 117th year in the VFL/AFL since it began in 1897. In Paul Roos' final season as senior coach before succession coach, Simon Goodwin took over, the club won ten matches out of twenty-two to finish eleventh on the ladder out of eighteen teams and finished on 97.6 percent. It was the club's best season on the field since the 2011 season in which the club finished with eight wins, thirteen losses and a draw, to finish with a percentage of 85.3.

== Senior personnel ==
Nathan Jones was retained as captain for the third consecutive season. The leadership group was overhauled where none of the leaders, aside from Jones, were retained in the group from 2015 and the club elected to have no vice-captain. The leadership group included Colin Garland, Max Gawn, Nathan Jones, Tom McDonald, Bernie Vince, and Jack Viney.

Due to Paul Roos entering his final year as senior coach, there was a reshuffle in coaching, whereby Roos' role shifted towards a focus on culture, so the transition to coach-in-waiting, Simon Goodwin, was as smooth as possible for 2017. Goodwin increased his responsibilities for the 2016 season, including being the senior coach for the three matches against Port Adelaide, Western Bulldogs, and St Kilda during the 2016 NAB Challenge. In addition there was increased responsibility for development and strategy coach, Brendan McCartney, as the club increased its focus on development. After the departure of development coach and game-day runner, Brad Miller, to Greater Western Sydney to coach their NEAFL side, 2015 retiree, Daniel Cross filled his position as development and rehabilitation coach, and game-day runner. Craig Jennings was recruited from the Western Bulldogs in September 2015 in a newly created position, the game analyst and education coordinator. Michelle Cowan continued in her role as the coach of Melbourne's women's team and in February, she became the first female assistant coach in Melbourne's history and the second in AFL history serving as the player development and welfare coach. Due to family reasons she left the club in July and returned to Western Australia to work with the Fremantle Football Club. Glen Bartlett continued in his role as club president, a role he has held since August 2013. Chief Executive Officer, Peter Jackson, continued with the club after signing a contract extension to the end of the 2017 season.

== Fixture summary ==
A fixture that was described by Chief Executive Officer, Peter Jackson, as "pleasing", Melbourne played four out of their first five matches at the Melbourne Cricket Ground, with twelve in total at the MCG. Melbourne featured in the only Sunday-night match of the AFL season when they hosted Richmond in the ANZAC Day eve match at the MCG. They again hosted Collingwood in the annual Queen's Birthday clash in round 12 at the MCG, and due to an ongoing sponsorship deal with Tourism NT, they again played two home matches in the Northern Territory, the first against Port Adelaide at TIO Traeger Park in round 10 and the second against Fremantle at TIO Stadium in round 16. Melbourne played for premiership points in Tasmania for the first time when they played North Melbourne in round 3 at Blundstone Arena, they also played a match in Queensland for the first time since round 20, 2013 when they played Gold Coast at Metricon Stadium in round seven, meaning they played in every state and territory in Australia excluding the Australian Capital Territory.

The teams Melbourne played twice were Hawthorn, Port Adelaide, Collingwood, St Kilda, and Gold Coast, with Hawthorn the only team that made the final eight the previous season. Due to finishing in the bottom six in 2015, Melbourne did not play in many prime-time matches with no Thursday and Friday night matches and they played in only two Saturday night matches, both outside of Victoria. Based on analysis by AFL Media and The Age, Melbourne's draw difficulty was consistent with their bottom six finish in 2015, however, analysis by the Herald Sun estimated they had the fourth most difficult fixture in the league.

== 2016 list changes ==
=== 2015 trades ===
Date	Trade gained	Traded from	Trade lost	Ref
Jake Melksham	15 October	Essendon	Pick 25	
Ben Kennedy; Pick 29; Pick 50	19 October	Collingwood	Jeremy Howe	
Ben Kennedy; Pick 29; Pick 50	19 October	Port Adelaide	Jimmy Toumpas	
Pick 3 Pick 10; Pick 43	21 October	Gold Coast	Pick 6 Pick 29; 1st round pick (2016)	
Pick 94	21 October	Hawthorn	Jack Fitzpatrick	
Tomas Bugg; Pick 7	21 October	Greater Western Sydney	Pick 10; Pick 43; Pick 64	

=== Retirements and delistings ===
Player	New club	League	Reason	Ref
Daniel Cross	Melbourne	AFL	Retired, but stayed as an assistant coach	
Viv Michie	Melbourne	AFL	Delisted, but re-drafted as a rookie	
Rohan Bail	St Kevins	VAFA	Delisted	
Jack Fitzpatrick	Hawthorn	AFL	Delisted	
Mark Jamar	Essendon	AFL	Delisted	
Jordie McKenzie	North Adelaide	SANFL	Delisted	
Aidan Riley	Sturt	SANFL	Delisted	

=== National draft ===
Round	Overall pick	Player	State	Position	Team from	League from	Ref
1	4	Clayton Oliver	VIC	Midfielder	Murray Bushrangers	TAC Cup	
1	9	Sam Weideman	VIC	Forward	Eastern Ranges	TAC Cup	
3	42	Mitch King	VIC	Ruck	Murray Bushrangers	TAC Cup	
3	46	Liam Hulett	VIC	Forward	Dandenong Stingrays	TAC Cup	

=== Rookie draft ===
Round	Overall pick	Player	State	Position	Team from	League from	Ref
1	6	Josh Wagner	QLD	Defender	Aspley	NEAFL	
2	24	Viv Michie	VIC	Midfielder	Melbourne	AFL	
3	41	Joel Smith	VIC	Forward	3-year non-registered player		

== 2016 squad ==
Melbourne Football Club
Senior list		Rookie list	Coaching staff
1 Jesse Hogan; 2 Nathan Jones (c); 3 Christian Salem; 4 Jack Watts; 5 Christian Petracca; 6 Chris Dawes; 7 Jack Viney; 8 Heritier Lumumba; 9 Jack Trengove; 10 Angus Brayshaw; 11 Max Gawn; 12 Dom Tyson; 13 Clayton Oliver; 14 Lynden Dunn (vet); 15 Billy Stretch; 16 Dean Kent; 17 Sam Frost; 18 Jake Melksham *; 19 Ben Newton; 20 Colin Garland	21 Cameron Pedersen; 23 Bernie Vince; 24 Jay Kennedy -Harris; 25 Tom McDonald; 26 Sam Weideman; 27 Liam Hulett; 28 Oscar McDonald; 29 Jayden Hunt; 30 Alex Neal-Bullen; 31 Jack Grimes; 32 Tomas Bugg; 33 Jake Spencer; 34 Mitch King; 35 Ben Kennedy; 36 Jeff Garlett; 37 Aaron vandenBerg; 39 Neville Jetta; 43 James Harmes; 45 Matt Jones; 46 Dean Terlich	22 Viv Michie; 41 Mitch White; 42 Josh Wagner; 44 Joel Smith (B); 47 Max King	Head coach: Paul Roos; Assistant coaches: Simon Goodwin (senior assistant); Brendan McCartney (development and strategy); Ben Mathews (stoppages); Jade Rawlings (defence); Greg Stafford (ruck); Daniel McPherson (senior development); Brett Allison (head of development); Shannon Byrnes (welfare and development); Daniel Cross (rehab and development); Legend: (c) Captain(s); (vc) Vice-captain(s); Long-term injury list; Upgraded rookie(s); (vet) Veterans list; (B) Category B rookie; (*) Suspended for 2016 season; Updated: 18 August 2016; Source(s): Players, Coaches

== 2016 season ==
=== Pre-season ===
The 2016 NAB Challenge saw the senior assistant coach, Simon Goodwin take over as coach in preparation for him becoming the senior coach of the club from the 2017 season. Melbourne was one of three teams to finish undefeated during the pre-season competition with a nineteen-point win against Port Adelaide, a twelve-point win against Western Bulldogs and a twenty five point win against St Kilda. The list headed into the main season with very little injuries apart from young midfielder, Angus Brayshaw who suffered a knee injury five seconds into the first match of the NAB Challenge, which forced him to miss the remainder of the pre-season and round one against Greater Western Sydney.

==== Week 1 ====
Round 1
Saturday, 27 February (1:35 pm)	Port Adelaide	def. by	Melbourne	Playford Alive Oval (crowd: 4,981)	Report
1.3.3 (30); 1.6.5 (50); 1.6.5 (50); 1.10.7 (76)	Q1; Q2; Q3; Final	0.2.2 (14); 0.4.3 (27); 0.10.5 (65); 0.15.5 (95)	Television broadcast: Fox Footy
Broadbent (SG), Westhoff 3, Boak 3, Schulz, White, R. Gray, Young	Goals	Garlett 3, Kent 2, vandenBerg 2, Pedersen 2, Salem, Kennedy, M. Jones, Hogan, Harmes, Tyson
Boak, Westhoff, Hartlett, Toumpas, S. Gray, Pittard	Best	Gawn, Viney, vandenBerg, Garlett, Kennedy, Tyson
Nil	Injuries	Brayshaw (knee)
Nil	Reports	Nil

==== Week 2 ====
Round 2
Sunday, 6 March (2:05 pm)	Western Bulldogs	def. by	Melbourne	Highgate Recreational Reserve (crowd: 4,189)	Report
0.4.3 (27); 0.4.5 (29); 1.7.8 (59); 1.7.9 (60)	Q1; Q2; Q3; Final	0.1.2 (8); 0.4.4 (28); 0.6.5 (35); 0.10.12 (72)	Television broadcast: Fox Footy
Webb (SG), Hrovat, Roughead, Minson, Redpath, Williams, Honeychurch, Jong	Goals	Watts 3, Pedersen, Garlett, vandenBerg, Tyson, Harmes, N. Jones, Frost
Jong, Hrovat, Honeychurch, Liberatore, Daniel	Best	Viney, N. Jones, Watts, Vince, Bugg
Nil	Injuries	Nil
Nil	Reports	Nil

==== Week 3 ====
Round 3
Sunday, 13 March (4:10 pm)	Melbourne	def.	St Kilda	Etihad Stadium (crowd: 8,621)	Report
0.4.1 (25); 0.8.5 (53); 0.11.12 (78); 1.14.14 (107)	Q1; Q2; Q3; Final	0.4.5 (29); 0.6.7 (43); 9.10.0 (64); 0.12.11 (83)	Television broadcast: Fox Footy
Salem (SG), Garlett 3, Watts 2, Oliver 2, Kent 2, Hogan 2, Kennedy, Pedersen, Bugg	Goals	Billings 3, Bruce 2, Armitage, Montagna, Hickey, Steven, Newnes, Weller, Dunstan
Bugg, N. Jones, Gawn, T. McDonald, Garlett, Tyson, Salem	Best	Steven, Billings, Armitage, Montagna, Newnes, Fisher, Geary
Jetta (leg), M. Jones (concussion)	Injuries	Riewoldt (calf)
Nil	Reports	Nil

=== Home and away season ===
The opening round saw Melbourne defeat Greater Western Sydney by two points at the Melbourne Cricket Ground (MCG) in a come from behind victory in which Melbourne scored six final quarter goals to two. Clayton Oliver made his AFL debut in the match, with Tomas Bugg and Ben Kennedy playing their first match for Melbourne after being traded from Greater Western Sydney and Collingwood respectively. The club entered the round two match against Essendon as heavy favourites; Melbourne ultimately lost the match by thirteen points, with Jack Viney admitting after the match they "lacked respect" for Essendon due to the numerous top-up signings from the supplements saga and the players "got ahead of themselves". The next three matches saw Melbourne play consistently for the first time during the season with a narrow three point loss to North Melbourne, a thirty-five point win against Collingwood, and a thirty-three point win against Richmond in the Anzac Day eve match, which saw Melbourne win two matches in a row for the first time since 2011. Josh Wagner and Jayden Hunt made their AFL debuts in rounds three and four respectively. Melbourne played their first match at Etihad Stadium for the season in a home match against St Kilda, even though St Kilda are a tenant of Etihad Stadium. Melbourne lost the match by thirty-nine points, however the match saw the highly hyped Christian Petracca make his long-awaited AFL debut and Jesse Hogan kicked a career-high seven goals.

The next two out of three matches were large victories by Melbourne with a seventy-three point win against Gold Coast at Metricon Stadium in round seven and a sixty-three point win against the Brisbane Lions at the MCG in round nine. The match against Gold Coast saw Melbourne score 161 points, their highest since round six in 2004. The match in between, however, was a thirty-two point loss to eventual premiers, the Western Bulldogs. The club headed to Alice Springs in round ten for their first sold home match of the year as part of a sponsorship with Tourism NT. A disappointing match saw Melbourne lose to Port Adelaide by forty-five points in conjunction with a one-match suspension to the in form, Jack Viney. Jack Trengove made his long-awaited return in round eleven against Hawthorn, playing his first AFL match since round two in 2014. The match was level at three-quarter time, however three final quarter goals to zero saw Hawthorn win by eighteen points. The next week was the annual Queen's Birthday clash against Collingwood which Melbourne won by forty-six points, their first Queen's Birthday win since 2007. A fifty-five point loss to Sydney in extremely wet conditions at the Sydney Cricket Ground was Melbourne's last match before the mid-season bye. Melbourne's score of 31 was the lowest score ever recorded at the Sydney Cricket Ground.

Melbourne's first match after the bye was against the in form, Adelaide at the MCG, losing by twenty-two points; the match was described as a much closer match than what the scoreboard suggested. Melbourne returned to the Northern Territory for the second time during the season, this time in a thirty-two point win against Fremantle in Darwin; it was also Melbourne's first win in the Northern Territory since 2011. In round 17, Melbourne returned to Etihad Stadium to play against St Kilda for the second time in the season, it was another disappointing loss and the fourteenth consecutive loss against St Kilda. The chance of playing finals was effectively ruled out by then-coach Paul Roos. The next four weeks was the best patch of football for Melbourne, with a narrow six point loss to West Coast in Perth, in which West Coast coach, Adam Simpson declared Melbourne should have won the match. Three consecutive wins against Gold Coast, Hawthorn and Port Adelaide meant Melbourne were back in the frame to potentially play finals. The match against Hawthorn, labelled as one of the upsets of the season, drew high media attention as Hawthorn were on a nine-match winning streak, were on top of the ladder and Melbourne hadn't defeated Hawthorn since 2006. The win against Port Adelaide was also Melbourne's first victory against Port Adelaide in South Australia since 2000. Despite having a chance to play finals, Melbourne lost to an out of form Carlton who had lost their previous nine matches, Melbourne's performance was described as "dispirited". The final match of the season saw Melbourne play at Simonds Stadium against Geelong, they suffered a 111-point loss, the worst for the season and outgoing coach, Paul Roos' biggest defeat in his coaching career.

==== Round 1 ====
Round 1
Saturday, 26 March (1:40 pm)	Melbourne	def.	Greater Western Sydney	Melbourne Cricket Ground (crowd: 28,505)	Report
5.0 (30); 5.4 (34); 6.5 (41); 12.8 (80)	Q1; Q2; Q3; Final	3.4 (22); 6.8 (44); 8.14 (62); 10.18 (78)	Television broadcast: Fox Footy
Hogan 3, Garlett 2, vandenBerg 2, Vince, Kennedy, Harmes, Kent, Watts	Goals	Ward 2, Lobb 2, Johnson 2, Scully, Smith, Steele, Greene
Viney, Kennedy, T. McDonald, Oliver, N. Jones, Watts, Hogan	Best	Ward, Scully, Shaw, Davis, Shiel, Lobb
O. McDonald (ankle)	Injuries	Nil
Nil	Reports	Nil
Debut(s): Clayton Oliver; Debut(s) for MFC: Tomas Bugg (Greater Western Sydney), Ben Kennedy (Collingwood); Milestone(s): Jack Viney (50th AFL game), Clayton Oliver (Rising Star nominee); Brownlow votes: Jack Viney (Melbourne) 3 votes, Clayton Oliver (Melbourne) 2 votes, Phil Davis (Greater Western Sydney) 1 vote Record: 1 win, 0 losses, 0 draws (102.56%); Ladder position: 9th

==== Round 2 ====
Round 2
Saturday, 2 April (2:10 pm)	Essendon	def.	Melbourne	Melbourne Cricket Ground (crowd: 50,424)	Report
2.2 (14); 7.7 (49); 8.10 (58); 11.14 (80)	Q1; Q2; Q3; Final	1.4 (10); 6.4 (40); 7.7 (49); 10.7 (67)	Television broadcast: Fox Footy
Z. Merrett 2, Brown 2, Daniher 2, Stokes, Hartley, Kommer, Langford, Parish	Goals	Kennedy 3, Garlett 2, Brayshaw, Harmes, Oliver, Watts, Hogan
Z. Merrett, Daniher, Zaharakis, Parish, J. Merrett, Goddard, Kelly, McDonald-Tipungwuti	Best	Kennedy, Vince, N. Jones, M. Jones, Tyson
Fantasia (knee), Dea (nose)	Injuries	Nil
Ambrose (rough conduct)	Reports	Nil
Milestone(s): Clayton Oliver (1st AFL goal); Brownlow votes: Zach Merrett (Essendon) 3 votes, David Zaharakis (Essendon) 2 votes, Joe Daniher (Essendon) 1 vote Record: 1 win, 1 loss, 0 draws (93.04%); Ladder position: 11th

==== Round 3 ====
Round 3
Sunday, 10 April (1:10 pm)	North Melbourne	def.	Melbourne	Blundstone Arena (crowd: 12,607)	Report
8.2 (50); 10.4 (64); 17.7 (109); 21.10 (136)	Q1; Q2; Q3; Final	2.2 (14); 11.5 (71); 14.7 (91); 20.11 (131)	Television broadcast: Fox Footy
Harvey 6, Goldstein 5, Waite 4, Petrie 2, Gibson 2, Ziebell, Macmillan	Goals	Kent 4, Watts 3, Hogan 3, Oliver 2, Gawn 2, N. Jones, vandenBerg, Dunn, Tyson, Harmes, Viney
Harvey, Goldstein, Waite, Ziebell, Cunnington	Best	Vince, Viney, Oliver, Gawn, Hogan, Kent
Garner (hamstring)	Injuries	Nil
Nil	Reports	Nil
Debut(s): Josh Wagner; Brownlow votes: Todd Goldstein (North Melbourne) 3 votes, Brent Harvey (North Melbourne) 2 votes, Jack Viney (Melbourne) 1 vote Record: 1 win, 2 losses, 0 draws (94.56%); Ladder position: 10th

==== Round 4 ====
Round 4
Sunday, 17 April (3:20 pm)	Collingwood	def. by	Melbourne	Melbourne Cricket Ground (crowd: 47,558)	Report
1.2 (8); 6.5 (35); 8.10 (58); 9.13 (67)	Q1; Q2; Q3; Final	6.2 (38); 11.2 (68); 14.4 (88); 16.6 (102)	Television broadcast: Seven Network
Cloke 2, Sidebottom 2, Varcoe, Treloar, Sinclair, Fasolo, Moore	Goals	Watts 4, Tyson 2, Pedersen 2, Hogan 2, Viney, Frost, Kennedy, Brayshaw, Kent, Gawn
Pendlebury, Treloar, Sidebottom, Adams, Langdon	Best	Gawn, Viney, Watts, Wagner, Tyson, N. Jones, Bugg
Goldsack (illness) replaced in selected side by White, Reid (knee), Sinclair (concussion), Cloke (elbow)	Injuries	Brayshaw (concussion)
Nil	Reports	Nil
Debut(s): Jayden Hunt; Brownlow votes: Jack Watts (Melbourne) 3 votes, Nathan Jones (Melbourne) 2 votes, Jack Viney (Melbourne) 1 vote Record: 2 wins, 2 losses, 0 draws (105.26%); Ladder position: 10th

==== Round 5 ====
Round 5
Sunday, 24 April (7:10 pm)	Melbourne	def.	Richmond	Melbourne Cricket Ground (crowd: 59,968)	Report
5.1 (31); 11.3 (69); 14.7 (91); 20.9 (129)	Q1; Q2; Q3; Final	2.3 (15); 7.5 (47); 11.9 (75); 14.12 (96)	Television broadcast: Seven Network
Garlett 4, Vince 3, Watts 3, Tyson 2, Gawn 2, Brayshaw, Bugg, Salem, Harmes, Frost, Kent	Goals	Riewoldt 3, Lloyd 3, Vickery 3, Edwards, Chaplin, Martin, B. Ellis, Miles
Gawn, Viney, Tyson, Salem, Kent, N. Jones, Garlett	Best	Cotchin, Miles, Riewoldt, Edwards
Nil	Injuries	Deledio (quad) replaced in the side by Townsend, Riewoldt (ankle)
Nil	Reports	Rance (striking)
Brownlow votes: Max Gawn (Melbourne) 3 votes, Jack Viney (Melbourne) 2 votes, Dom Tyson (Melbourne) 1 vote Record: 3 wins, 2 losses, 0 draws (111.38%); Ladder position: 10th

==== Round 6 ====
Round 6
Saturday, 30 April (1:45 pm)	Melbourne	def. by	St Kilda	Etihad Stadium (crowd: 27,260)	Report
5.3 (33); 8.3 (51); 11.5 (71); 15.6 (96)	Q1; Q2; Q3; Final	3.4 (22); 9.9 (63); 17.11 (113); 20.15 (135)	Television broadcast: Seven Network
Hogan 7, Watts 2, Frost 2, Bugg, Tyson, N. Jones, Kent	Goals	Membrey 5, Riewoldt 3, Bruce 3, Acres 2, Sinclair 2, Dunstan, Newnes, Gresham, Weller, Armitage
Hogan, Viney, N. Jones, Vince	Best	Riewoldt, Acres, Steven, Membrey, Sinclair, Armitage
Harmes (corked thigh), Salem (concussion)	Injuries	Ross (shoulder), Webster (thumb)
Nil	Reports	Nil
Debut(s): Christian Petracca; Brownlow votes: Nick Riewoldt (St Kilda) 3 votes, Jesse Hogan (Melbourne) 2 votes, Tim Membrey (St Kilda) 1 vote Record: 3 wins, 3 losses, 0 draws (102.20%); Ladder position: 9th

==== Round 7 ====
Round 7
Saturday, 7 May (5:10 pm)	Gold Coast	def. by	Melbourne	Metricon Stadium (crowd: 12,780)	Report
4.2 (26); 8.2 (50); 11.3 (69); 14.3 (87)	Q1; Q2; Q3; Final	2.3 (15); 8.7 (55); 17.11 (113); 24.16 (160)	Television broadcast: Fox Footy
Lynch 4, Ablett 2, Garlett 2, Wright 2, Currie, Grant, Hall, Macpherson	Goals	Garlett 3, Harmes 3, Pedersen 3, Gawn 2, N. Jones 2, Kennedy 2, Petracca 2, Viney 2, Hogan, Kent, Stretch, Tyson, Vince
Lynch, Day, Saad, Miller, Harbrow	Best	Gawn, Viney, N. Jones, Harmes, Vince, Oliver, Bugg
Rosa (hamstring), Sexton (forearm)	Injuries	Nil
Nil	Reports	Nil
Milestone(s): Christian Petracca (1st AFL goal), James Harmes (Rising Star nominee); Brownlow votes: Max Gawn (Melbourne) 3 votes, Nathan Jones (Melbourne) 2 votes, Jack Viney (Melbourne) 1 vote Record: 4 wins, 3 losses, 0 draws (112.67%); Ladder position: 9th

==== Round 8 ====
Round 8
Sunday, 15 May (3:20 pm)	Melbourne	def. by	Western Bulldogs	Melbourne Cricket Ground (crowd: 39,921)	Report
2.2 (14); 5.5 (35); 7.9 (51); 12.10 (82)	Q1; Q2; Q3; Final	5.5 (35); 8.9 (57); 12.10 (82); 17.12 (114)	Television broadcast: Seven Network
Watts 3, Kennedy 2, Garlett 2, Viney, Petracca, Oliver, T. McDonald, Hogan	Goals	Stringer 5, Redpath 3, Picken 2, Dickson 2, McLean, Liberatore, Wallis, Dale, Hunter
Viney, Tyson, Stretch, Kennedy, T. McDonald	Best	Bontempelli, Liberatore, Hunter, Dahlhaus, M. Boyd, Picken, Stringer
Nil	Injuries	Stringer (corked calf), Roberts (head), Roughead (shoulder)
Vince (rough conduct)	Reports	Nil
Milestone(s): Jack Watts (100th AFL goal), Bernie Vince (50th MFC game); Brownlow votes: Marcus Bontempelli (Western Bulldogs) 3 votes, Lachie Hunter (Western Bulldogs) 2 votes, Tom Liberatore (Western Bulldogs) 1 vote Record: 4 wins, 4 losses, 0 draws (106.81%); Ladder position: 9th

==== Round 9 ====
Round 9
Sunday, 22 May (1:10 pm)	Melbourne	def.	Brisbane Lions	Melbourne Cricket Ground (crowd: 26,892)	Report
5.6 (36); 10.7 (77); 13.10 (88); 19.17 (131)	Q1; Q2; Q3; Final	2.3 (15); 5.5 (35); 6.10 (46); 9.14 (68)	Television broadcast: Fox Footy
Hogan 5, Harmes 4, Garlett 2, Michie, Kent, Kennedy, Newton, N. Jones, Watts, Viney, Stretch	Goals	Bell 3, Lester 2, Zorko, Taylor, Keays, Freeman
Hogan, Bugg, Stretch, Petracca, Garlett, Oliver, Watts	Best	Zorko, Robinson, Bell, Rich
Oliver (corked thigh)	Injuries	Nil
Nil	Reports	Nil
Milestone(s): Nathan Jones (100th AFL goal), Viv Michie (1st AFL goal), Christian Petracca (Rising Star nominee); Brownlow votes: Jesse Hogan (Melbourne) 3 votes, James Harmes (Melbourne) 2 votes, Clayton Oliver (Melbourne) 1 vote Record: 5 wins, 4 losses, 0 draws (113.59%); Ladder position: 9th

==== Round 10 ====
Round 10
Saturday, 28 May (1:40 pm)	Melbourne	def. by	Port Adelaide	TIO Traeger Park (crowd: 5,146)	Report
2.7 (19); 4.9 (33); 9.12 (66); 10.16 (76)	Q1; Q2; Q3; Final	2.4 (16); 8.6 (54); 12.11 (83); 18.13 (121)	Television broadcast: Fox Footy
Hogan 3, Watts 2, Gawn 2, Neal-Bullen, Garlett, Kent	Goals	Dixon 5, Young 2, Wingard 2, Impey 2, Hartlett, Boak, Howard, R. Gray, Byrne-Jones, Krakouer, Neade
Gawn, N. Jones, Watts, Hogan, Wagner, T. McDonald	Best	Wingard, R. Gray, Ebert, Dixon, Westhoff, Boak, Byrne-Jones
Garland (cheekbone)	Injuries	Broadbent (gastro) replaced in selected side by S. Gray, Hombsch (hamstring), Stewart (concussion).
Nil	Reports	Nil
Brownlow votes: Chad Wingard (Port Adelaide) 3 votes, Charlie Dixon (Port Adelaide) 2 votes, Robbie Gray (Port Adelaide) 1 vote Record: 5 wins, 5 losses, 0 draws (107.33%); Ladder position: 9th

==== Round 11 ====
Round 11
Saturday, 4 June (1:45 pm)	Hawthorn	def.	Melbourne	Melbourne Cricket Ground (crowd: 41,833)	Report
4.5 (29); 6.7 (43); 8.14 (62); 11.16 (82)	Q1; Q2; Q3; Final	2.0 (12); 7.2 (44); 10.2 (62); 10.4 (64)	Television broadcast: Seven Network
Gunston 3, Breust 2, O'Brien 2, Rioli, Hill, Stewart, Puopolo	Goals	Kent 2, Watts 2, Dawes, Petracca, Hogan, vandenBerg, Tyson, N. Jones
Mitchell, Lewis, Gibson, Birchall, Smith, Frawley, Gunston	Best	Tyson, Vince, N. Jones, Watts, T. McDonald, Kent
Gunston (right ankle)	Injuries	Nil
Nil	Reports	Vince (striking)
Milestone(s): Max Gawn (50th AFL game); Brownlow votes: Bernie Vince (Melbourne) 3 votes, Josh Gibson (Hawthorn) 2 votes, Nathan Jones (Melbourne) 1 vote Record: 5 wins, 6 losses, 0 draws (105.08%); Ladder position: 11th

==== Round 12 ====
Round 12
Monday, 13 June (3:20 pm)	Melbourne	def.	Collingwood	Melbourne Cricket Ground (crowd: 60,158)	Report
2.4 (16); 9.6 (60); 11.7 (73); 16.8 (104)	Q1; Q2; Q3; Final	4.4 (38); 5.4 (34); 6.6 (42); 8.10 (58)	Television broadcast: Seven Network
Hogan 3, Kent 3, Gawn 3, Watts 2, Viney, Trengove, Petracca, N. Jones, Kennedy	Goals	Cox 2, Maynard, White, Sidebottom, Varcoe, Greenwood, Grundy
Gawn, Vince, N. Jones, Kent, T. McDonald, Tyson, Hogan, Bugg, Kennedy	Best	Treloar, Pendlebury, Howe, De Goey, Varcoe
vandenBerg (nose)	Injuries	Frost (shoulder), Reid (left knee), Pendlebury (left ankle)
Nil	Reports	Nil
Brownlow votes: Bernie Vince (Melbourne) 3 votes, Max Gawn (Melbourne) 2 votes, Nathan Jones (Melbourne) 1 vote Record: 6 wins, 6 losses, 0 draws (108.91%); Ladder position: 10th

==== Round 13 ====
Round 13
Sunday, 19 June (1:10 pm)	Sydney	def.	Melbourne	Sydney Cricket Ground (crowd: 19,086)	Report
2.6 (18); 4.8 (32); 6.13 (49); 12.14 (86)	Q1; Q2; Q3; Final	1.1 (7); 2.3 (15); 3.6 (24); 4.7 (31)	Television broadcast: Fox Footy
Franklin 4, Towers 2, McGlynn 2, Hewett, Kennedy, Nankervis, Lloyd	Goals	Petracca 2, Kent, Hogan
McVeigh, Parker, Hannebery, Franklin, Jones, Towers	Best	Vince, N. Jones, Gawn, Petracca, Viney, Wagner
Nil	Injuries	Nil
Nil	Reports	Nil
Brownlow votes: Luke Parker (Sydney) 3 votes, Lance Franklin (Sydney) 2 votes, Jarrad McVeigh (Sydney) 1 vote Record: 6 wins, 7 losses, 0 draws (103.73%); Ladder position: 10th

==== Round 14 ====
Round 14
Bye; Melbourne

==== Round 15 ====
Round 15
Sunday, 3 July (3:20 pm)	Melbourne	def. by	Adelaide	Melbourne Cricket Ground (crowd: 29,133)	Report
2.3 (15); 10.4 (64); 14.5 (89); 15.8 (98)	Q1; Q2; Q3; Final	5.2 (32); 8.5 (43); 15.8 (98); 18.12 (120)	Television broadcast: Fox Footy
Gartlett 4, Hogan 3, Watts 3, Kennedy, Hunt, Kent, N. Jones, Harmes	Goals	Walker 3, Douglas 3, Betts 3, Jenkins 2, Cameron 2, McGovern 2, Lynch, Atkins, Lyons
Watts, Hunt, N. Jones, Hogan, Gartlett, Jetta	Best	Laird, Walker, M. Crouch, B. Crouch, Cameron, Douglas
Nil	Injuries	Nil
Nil	Reports	Nil
Milestone(s): Dom Tyson (50th MFC game), Jayden Hunt (1st AFL goal); Brownlow votes: Rory Laird (Adelaide) 3 votes, Nathan Jones (Melbourne) 2 votes, Rory Sloane (Adelaide) 1 vote Record: 6 wins, 8 losses, 0 draws (101.73%); Ladder position: 10th

==== Round 16 ====
Round 16
Saturday, 9 July (7:10 pm)	Melbourne	def.	Fremantle	TIO Stadium (crowd: 8,163)	Report
6.5 (41); 9.8 (62); 11.11 (77); 12.15 (87)	Q1; Q2; Q3; Final	2.0 (12); 3.1 (19); 7.4 (46); 8.7 (55)	Television broadcast: Fox Footy
Hogan 4, Watts 3, Kent 3, vandenBerg, N. Jones	Goals	Pavlich 3, Mayne 2, Suban, Taberner, Ballantyne
Hogan, Viney, N. Jones, Watts, Hunt, Tyson, Grimes	Best	Neale, Hill, Sutcliffe, Pavlich, Blakely
O. McDonald (ankle), Vince (shin)	Injuries	Mundy (concussion)
Nil	Reports	Weller (high contact)
Brownlow votes: Nathan Jones (Melbourne) 3 votes, Jack Viney (Melbourne) 2 votes, Jesse Hogan (Melbourne) 1 vote Record: 7 wins, 8 losses, 0 draws (103.98%); Ladder position: 10th

==== Round 17 ====
Round 17
Sunday, 17 July (3:20 pm)	St Kilda	def.	Melbourne	Etihad Stadium (crowd: 25,322)	Report
3.3 (21); 8.6 (54); 10.12 (72); 15.20 (110)	Q1; Q2; Q3; Final	6.2 (38); 6.5 (41); 9.7 (61); 11.8 (74)	Television broadcast: Seven Network
Membrey 4, Weller 3, Geary 2, Montagna, Bruce, Riewoldt, Roberton, Dunstan	Goals	Petracca 2, Garlett 2, Gawn 2, Watts, vandenBerg, Hogan, Viney, Kennedy
Hickey, Membrey, Steven, Weller, Ross, Montagna	Best	Viney, Vince, T. McDonald, Jetta, Harmes
Nil	Injuries	Hogan (hip), Watts (right ankle)
Nil	Reports	Hogan (striking)
Milestone(s): Jack Grimes (100th AFL game); Brownlow votes: Tim Membrey (St Kilda) 3 votes, Maverick Weller (St Kilda) 2 votes, Jack Viney (Melbourne) 1 vote Record: 7 wins, 9 losses, 0 draws (101.27%); Ladder position: 11th

==== Round 18 ====
Round 18
Saturday, 23 July (2:35 pm)	West Coast	def.	Melbourne	Domain Stadium (crowd: 33,908)	Report
2.1 (13); 5.2 (32); 8.4 (52); 10.6 (66)	Q1; Q2; Q3; Final	2.2 (14); 5.4 (34); 8.10 (58); 8.12 (60)	Television broadcast: Fox Footy
Kennedy 3, Priddis, Darling, Duggan, Lycett, Cripps, Gaff, Hill	Goals	Garlett 3, Dawes 2, M Jones, Petracca, Kent
Priddis, Shuey, Gaff, Kennedy, Hurn, Lycett	Best	N Jones, Tyson, Viney, Garlett, Kent, Gawn
Nil	Injuries	Jetta (left knee)
Nil	Reports	Nil
Brownlow votes: Matt Priddis (West Coast) 3 votes, Dom Tyson (Melbourne) 2 votes, Dean Kent (Melbourne) 1 vote Record: 7 wins, 10 losses, 0 draws (100.83%); Ladder position: 11th

==== Round 19 ====
Round 19
Sunday, 31 July (1:10 pm)	Melbourne	def.	Gold Coast	Melbourne Cricket Ground (crowd: 20,627)	Report
1.3 (9); 6.6 (42); 7.10 (52); 9.12 (66)	Q1; Q2; Q3; Final	3.3 (21); 4.6 (30); 6.8 (44); 9.10 (64)	Television broadcast: Fox Footy
vandenBerg 3, Watts 3, Dawes, Kent, Petracca	Goals	Lynch 2, Garlett 2, Matera 2, Malceski, Shaw, Grant
Tyson, Watts, Harmes, vandenBerg, O. McDonald, Gawn	Best	Miller, Rosa, Lynch, Harbrow, Shaw
Hogan (knee)	Injuries	Shaw (ankle)
Nil	Reports	Nil
Milestone(s): Tom McDonald (100th AFL game), Chris Dawes (50th MFC game); Brownlow votes: Max Gawn (Melbourne) 3 votes, Jack Watts (Melbourne) 2 votes, Dom Tyson (Melbourne) 1 vote Record: 8 wins, 10 losses, 0 draws (100.92%); Ladder position: 11th

==== Round 20 ====
Round 20
Saturday, 6 August (2:10 pm)	Melbourne	def.	Hawthorn	Melbourne Cricket Ground (crowd: 38,818)	Report
5.2 (32); 9.2 (56); 12.6 (78); 17.8 (110)	Q1; Q2; Q3; Final	3.3 (21); 7.9 (51); 10.12 (72); 11.15 (81)	Television broadcast: Fox Footy
Watts 3, Weideman 2, Bugg 2, Tyson 2, Petracca, Gawn, Hunt, Kent, Brayshaw, vandenBerg, Stretch, Pedersen	Goals	Rioli 4, Gunston 2, Ceglar 2, Smith 2, O'Brien
N. Jones, Gawn, Viney, Tyson, Watts, Vince, T. McDonald, Oliver	Best	Rioli, Smith, Hodge, Lewis, Mitchell
Nil	Injuries	Stratton (pectoral muscle)
Nil	Reports	Nil
Debut(s): Sam Weideman; Milestone(s): Dean Kent (50th AFL game), Sam Weideman (1st AFL goal); Brownlow votes: Jack Viney (Melbourne) 3 votes, Max Gawn (Melbourne) 2 votes, Cyril Rioli (Hawthorn) 1 vote Record: 9 wins, 10 losses, 0 draws (102.58%); Ladder position: 11th

==== Round 21 ====
Round 21
Saturday, 13 August (7:10 pm)	Port Adelaide	def. by	Melbourne	Adelaide Oval (crowd: 33,426)	Report
1.2 (8); 2.4 (16); 6.5 (35); 8.6 (54)	Q1; Q2; Q3; Final	4.3 (27); 8.5 (53); 9.9 (63); 13.16 (94)	Television broadcast: Fox Footy
Polec 2, Young 2, Wingard, Krakouer, Wines, S. Gray	Goals	Brayshaw 2, Bugg 2, Garlett 2, Frost, Kent, Oliver, Vince, Tyson, Watts, N. Jones
S. Gray, Polec, R. Gray, Pittard, Wines	Best	Tyson, Vince, Gawn, Oliver, Hunt
Wingard (hamstring)	Injuries	Nil
Nil	Reports	Nil
Milestone(s): Oscar McDonald (Rising Star nominee); Brownlow votes: Max Gawn (Melbourne) 3 votes, Dom Tyson (Melbourne) 2 votes, Jayden Hunt (Melbourne) 1 vote Record: 10 wins, 10 losses, 0 draws (104.78%); Ladder position: 9th

==== Round 22 ====
Round 22
Sunday, 21 August (1:10 pm)	Carlton	def.	Melbourne	Melbourne Cricket Ground (crowd: 40,693)	Report
4.5 (29); 7.8 (50); 10.10 (70); 11.12 (78)	Q1; Q2; Q3; Final	2.2 (14); 4.8 (32); 6.10 (46); 7.16 (58)	Television broadcast: Fox Footy
Buckley 3, Graham 2, Wright, Everitt, Cripps, Sumner, Jones, Phillips	Goals	VandenBerg, Hunt, Hogan, Oliver, Bugg, Neal-Bullen, Gawn
Cripps, Gibbs, Buckley, Docherty, Simpson	Best	Tyson, Viney, Hunt, N. Jones, Oliver
Silvagni (soreness) replaced in the selected side by Graham, Kerridge (illness) replaced in the selected side by Everitt, Buckley (head), C. Curnow (knee)	Injuries	Watts (eye), Kent (leg)
Nil	Reports	Nil
Brownlow votes: Patrick Cripps (Carlton) 3 votes, Bryce Gibbs (Carlton) 2 votes, Kade Simpson (Carlton) 1 vote Record: 10 wins, 11 losses, 0 draws (103.49%); Ladder position: 10th

==== Round 23 ====
Round 23
Saturday, 27 August (1:45 pm)	Geelong	def.	Melbourne	Simonds Stadium (crowd: 24,413)	Report
8.2 (50); 11.6 (72); 14.10 (94); 24.11 (155)	Q1; Q2; Q3; Final	2.0 (12); 3.2 (20); 3.6 (24); 6.8 (44)	Television broadcast: Seven Network
Hawkins 6, Menzel 4, Menegola 3, Bartel 3, Motlop 2, Caddy 2, McCarthy, Selwood, Duncan, Taylor	Goals	Garlett 2, vandenBerg, Weideman, Brayshaw, Hogan
Dangerfield, Caddy, Hawkins, Guthrie, Selwood, Taylor, Menzel	Best	Tyson, Petracca, Hunt, Salem
Kolodjashnij (calf)	Injuries	Kent (corked thigh), replaced in selected side by M. Jones
Nil	Reports	Nil
Brownlow votes: Patrick Dangerfield (Geelong) 3 votes, Joel Selwood (Geelong) 2 votes, Sam Menegola (Geelong) 1 vote Record: 10 wins, 12 losses, 0 draws (97.64%); Ladder position: 11th

== Ladder ==
Pos	Team	Pld	W	L	D	PF	PA	PP	Pts	Qualification
1	Sydney	22	17	5	0	2221	1469	151.2	68	2016 finals
2	Geelong	22	17	5	0	2235	1554	143.8	68	2016 finals
3	Hawthorn	22	17	5	0	2134	1800	118.6	68	2016 finals
4	Greater Western Sydney	22	16	6	0	2380	1663	143.1	64	2016 finals
5	Adelaide	22	16	6	0	2483	1795	138.3	64	2016 finals
6	West Coast	22	16	6	0	2181	1678	130.0	64	2016 finals
7	Western Bulldogs (P)	22	15	7	0	1857	1609	115.4	60	2016 finals
8	North Melbourne	22	12	10	0	1956	1859	105.2	48	2016 finals
9	St Kilda	22	12	10	0	1953	2041	95.7	48	
10	Port Adelaide	22	10	12	0	2055	1939	106.0	40	
11	Melbourne	22	10	12	0	1944	1991	97.6	40	
12	Collingwood	22	9	13	0	1910	1998	95.6	36	
13	Richmond	22	8	14	0	1713	2155	79.5	32	
14	Carlton	22	7	15	0	1568	1978	79.3	28	
15	Gold Coast	22	6	16	0	1778	2273	78.2	24	
16	Fremantle	22	4	18	0	1574	2119	74.3	16	
17	Brisbane Lions	22	3	19	0	1770	2872	61.6	12	
18	Essendon	22	3	19	0	1437	2356	61.0	12	

Source: AFL
Rules for classification: 1) points; 2) percentage; 3) number of points for.
(P) Premiers

=== Ladder breakdown by opposition ===
Opponent	Played	Won	Lost	Drew	Premiership points	Points for	Points against	Percentage (%)
Collingwood	2	2	0	0	8	206	125	164.80%
Gold Coast	2	2	0	0	8	226	151	149.67%
Brisbane Lions	1	1	0	0	4	131	68	192.65%
Fremantle	1	1	0	0	4	87	55	158.18%
Richmond	1	1	0	0	4	129	96	134.38%
Hawthorn	2	1	1	0	4	174	163	106.75%
Greater Western Sydney	1	1	0	0	4	80	78	102.56%
Port Adelaide	2	1	1	0	4	170	175	97.14%
North Melbourne	1	0	1	0	0	131	136	96.32%
West Coast	1	0	1	0	0	60	66	90.91%
Essendon	1	0	1	0	0	67	80	83.75%
Adelaide	1	0	1	0	0	98	120	81.67%
Carlton	1	0	1	0	0	58	78	74.56%
Western Bulldogs	1	0	1	0	0	82	114	71.93%
St Kilda	2	0	2	0	0	170	245	69.39%
Sydney	1	0	1	0	0	31	86	36.05%
Geelong	1	0	1	0	0	44	155	28.39%
Total	22	10	12	0	40	1944	1998	97.64%

== Tribunal and match review panel cases ==
Player	Round	Charge category	Verdict	Early plea	Result	Victim	Club	Ref(s)
Clayton Oliver	NAB Challenge	Rough conduct	Guilty	Yes	$1000	Aaron Young	Port Adelaide	
Cameron Pedersen	NAB Challenge	Rough conduct	Guilty	Yes	$1000	Nathan Wright	St Kilda	
Jeff Garlett	Round 1	Striking	Guilty	Yes	$1000	Phil Davis	Greater Western Sydney	
Bernie Vince	Round 3	Striking	Guilty	Yes	1 match	Jamie Macmillan	North Melbourne	
Christian Salem	Round 5	Involved in a melee (first offence)	Guilty	Yes	$1000	N/A	Richmond	
Jack Viney	Round 5	Involved in a melee (first offence)	Guilty	Yes	$1000	N/A	Richmond	
Lynden Dunn	Round 5	Involved in a melee (first offence)	Guilty	Yes	$1000	N/A	Richmond	
Jayden Hunt	Round 5	Involved in a melee (first offence)	Guilty	Yes	$1000	N/A	Richmond	
Nathan Jones	Round 5	Wrestling (second offence)	Guilty	Yes	$1500	Anthony Miles	Richmond	
Tomas Bugg	Round 5	Making contact with an injured player	Guilty	Yes	$1000	Jack Riewoldt	Richmond	
Neville Jetta	Round 8	Rough conduct	Guilty	Yes	1 match	Marcus Bontempelli	Western Bulldogs	
Cameron Pedersen	Round 8	Rough conduct	Guilty	Yes	$1500	Fletcher Roberts	Western Bulldogs	
Bernie Vince	Round 8	Rough conduct	Not guilty	N/A	N/A	Mitch Wallis	Western Bulldogs	
Nathan Jones	Round 9	Wrestling (third offence)	Guilty	Yes	$2500	Daniel Merrett	Brisbane Lions	
Jack Viney	Round 10	Striking	Guilty	Yes	1 match	Brad Ebert	Port Adelaide	
Nathan Jones	Round 11	Wrestling (third offence)	Guilty	Yes	$2500	Liam Shiels	Hawthorn	
Bernie Vince	Round 11	Striking	Not guilty	N/A	N/A	Isaac Smith	Hawthorn	
Bernie Vince	Round 13	Rough conduct	Guilty	Yes	$1000	Luke Parker	Sydney	
Jesse Hogan	Round 17	Striking	Guilty	Yes	$1000	Jarryn Geary	St Kilda	

== Awards ==
=== Brownlow Medal tally ===
Player	3 vote games	2 vote games	1 vote games	Total votes
Max Gawn	4	2	0	16
Jack Viney	2	2	4	14
Nathan Jones	1	3	2	11
Jesse Hogan	1	1	1	6
Dom Tyson	0	2	2	6
Bernie Vince	2	0	0	6
Jack Watts	1	1	0	5
Clayton Oliver	0	1	1	3
James Harmes	0	2	0	2
Jayden Hunt	0	0	1	1
Dean Kent	0	0	1	1
Total	11	14	12	71

=== Keith 'Bluey' Truscott Medal tally (top 10) ===
Position	Player	Votes
1st	Jack Viney	407
2nd	Nathan Jones	399
3rd	Max Gawn	374
4th	Dom Tyson	357
5th	Jack Watts	308
6th	Tom McDonald	306
7th	Bernie Vince	287
8th	Jesse Hogan	261
9th	Neville Jetta	260
10th	Dean Kent	235

Keith 'Bluey' Truscott Trophy – Jack Viney

Sid Anderson Memorial Trophy (second in the best and fairest) – Nathan Jones

Ron Barassi Snr Memorial Trophy (third in the best and fairest) – Max Gawn

Ivor Warne-Smith Memorial Trophy (fourth in the best and fairest) – Dom Tyson

Dick Taylor Memorial Trophy (fifth in the best and fairest) – Jack Watts

Harold Ball Memorial Trophy (best young player) – Jayden Hunt

Troy Broadbridge Trophy (best Melbourne-listed player in the VFL) – Jack Grimes

Ron Barassi Jnr Trophy (leadership award) – Jack Viney

Ian Ridley Trophy (club ambassador award) – Neville Jetta

Norm Smith Memorial Trophy (coach's award) – Max Gawn

James McDonald Trophy (heart and spirit award) – Max Gawn

Leading goalkicker award – Jesse Hogan (41 goals)
