= Sam Weideman =

Australian rules footballer (born 1997)

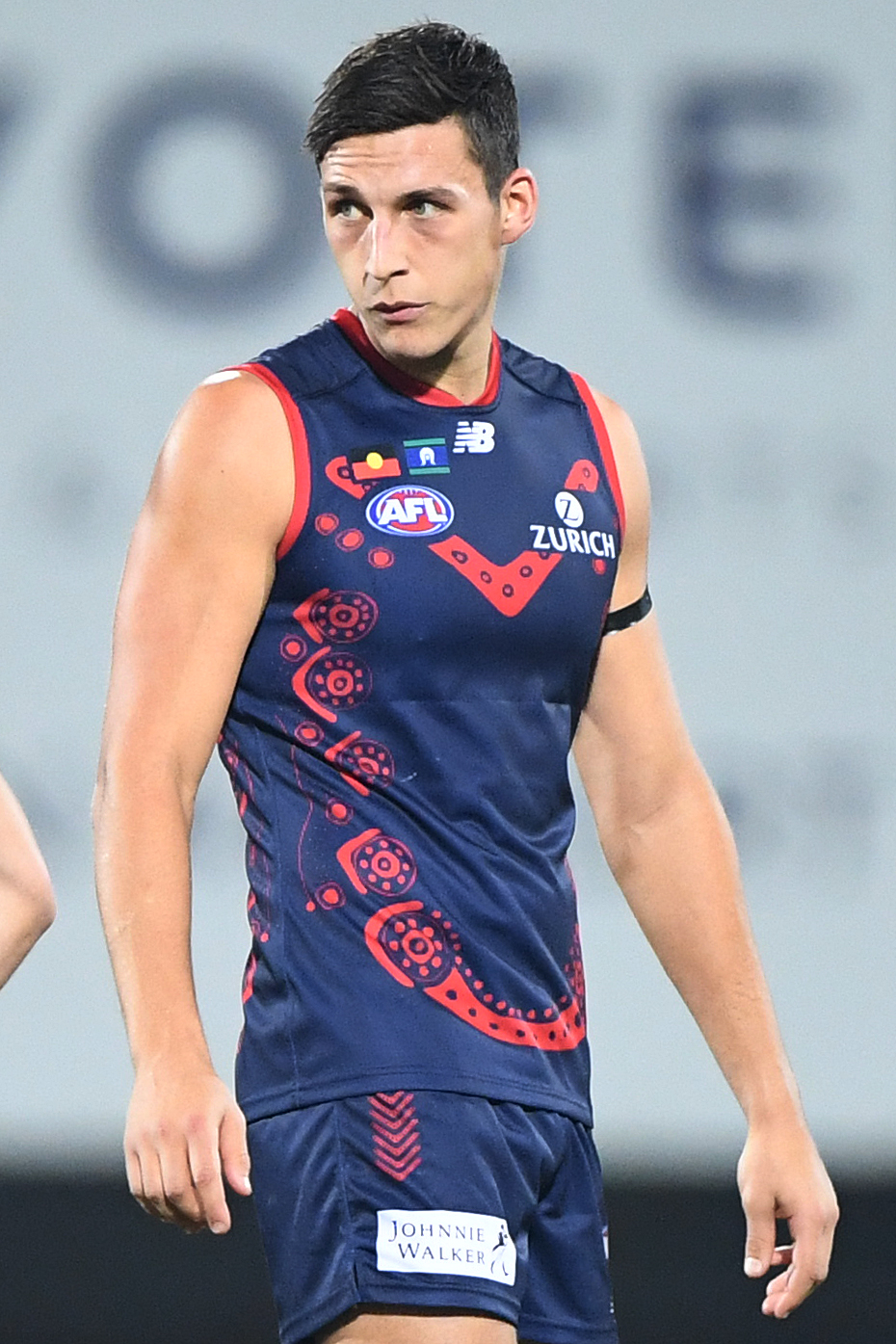
- Weideman in 2019

Personal information
- Full name: Samuel Weideman
- Born: 26 June 1997 (age 29)
- Original team: Eastern Ranges (TAC Cup)
- Draft: No. 9, 2015 national draft
- Debut: Round 20, 2016, Melbourne vs. Hawthorn, at MCG
- Height: 197 cm (6 ft 6 in)
- Weight: 97 kg (214 lb)
- Position: Key forward

Playing career
Years	Club	Games (Goals)
2016–2022	Melbourne	59 (62)
2023–2024	Essendon	17 (15)
Total		76 (77)

Career highlights
- VFL premiership player: 2022

Samuel Weideman (born 26 June 1997) is a former professional Australian rules footballer who played for Melbourne and Essendon in the Australian Football League (AFL). A key forward, Weideman is 1.96 metres (6 ft 5 in) tall and weighs 97 kilograms (214 lb). He played top-level football early, playing in the TAC Cup as a bottom-aged player. His achievements as a junior included two best and fairest awards and national representation. Even though an ankle injury forced him to miss the majority of his final year of junior football, he was drafted by Melbourne with the ninth selection in the 2015 AFL draft. He made his AFL debut in 2016, making him a third-generation footballer, whereby he is the grandson of the Collingwood Football Club's 1958 premiership captain, Murray Weideman, and the son of former Collingwood player, Mark Weideman.

== Early life ==
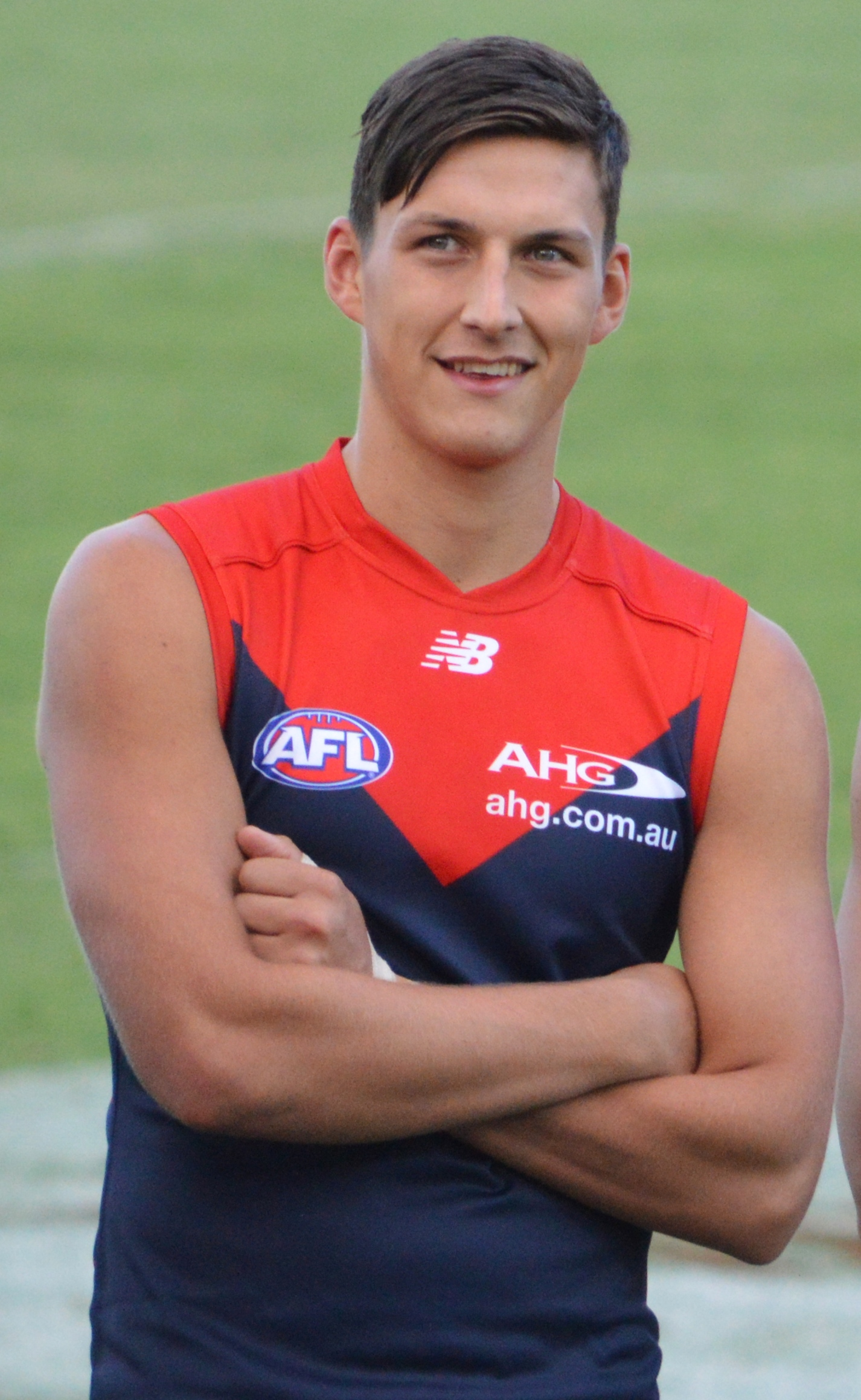
Weideman in February 2017

Weideman was born into an Australian rules football family with his grandfather, Murray Weideman, playing 180 matches for the Collingwood Football Club, including winning two premierships (he captained the 1958 premiership), winning three Copeland Trophies as Collingwood's best and fairest, and is a member of the Australian Football Hall of Fame; his father, Mark Weideman, also played for Collingwood, playing 28 games. Although both his father and grandfather played for Collingwood, he grew up a passionate supporter of the Richmond Football Club. He attended Whitefriars College, graduating year twelve in 2015, and he played his junior football with the Vermont Football Club in the Eastern Football League where he won back-to-back best and fairests after switching from a ruckman to a forward at 16 years of age. He played with the Eastern Ranges in the TAC Cup as a bottom-aged player in 2014, and despite an iron deficiency and an ankle stress fracture hampering his second half of the season, he played fifteen matches and kicked nineteen goals. He received a scholarship within the prestigious AFL Academy for 2015, which included playing in the curtain raiser for the 2014 AFL Grand Final with the under-17 Australian team.

Returning to the Eastern Ranges in 2015, Weideman played five matches, kicking nine goals, including five goals in one match against the Dandenong Stingrays. As part of the AFL Academy, he played two matches in April against Victorian Football League (VFL) sides, Werribee and the Northern Blues, both at the Melbourne Cricket Ground, in the second match, his first quarter saw him kick two goals and take five marks and he was named in the best players by AFL Media. He received mid-year honours through selection with Vic Metro for the 2015 AFL Under 18 Championships, and he was named vice-captain, however a re-aggravation of his ankle injury saw him ruled out for the entire championships and the remainder of the TAC Cup season. After playing no football since May, doubts surrounded Weideman and his injuries, however Eastern Ranges talent manager, Len Villani, noted "his qualities made him a rare commodity", and the AFL Academy coach, Brad Johnson, stated "every now and then you’ll see things from him and you know with good development into the future, he’s going to turn into a really strong, consistent performer" and "the right people have seen enough already through his junior days to say he’ll be able to get back to some pretty strong fitness, work on his endurance and become a really good hit-up forward". Along with comparisons to Fremantle forward, Matthew Pavlich, and Gold Coast forward, Tom Lynch, he was predicted to still be drafted inside the top ten in the 2015 national draft.

== AFL career ==
After being linked to the Melbourne Football Club in the weeks leading to the 2015 national draft, Weideman was drafted by them with their second selection and ninth overall. After Melbourne declared they would take a "patient approach" with him, he played with Melbourne's affiliate team in the Victorian Football League (VFL), the Casey Scorpions, and he kicked four goals in his debut match against Frankston along with four goals against the Northern Blues and three against Coburg. The match against Coburg was labelled his best for the year by Casey coach, Justin Plapp, and after kicking twenty goals from eleven matches, he made his AFL debut the next week in the twenty-nine point win against the Hawthorn Football Club at the Melbourne Cricket Ground in round 20. His debut match was praised within the AFL industry for him "having an immediate impact" and he was labelled as "impressive", where he kicked a goal with his first kick and amassed six disposals in the first quarter, finishing with two goals and thirteen disposals. During his debut match, he suffered a corked thigh which meant he missed the forty point win against Port Adelaide at the Adelaide Oval the next week. He returned in round 22 for the twenty point loss against Carlton at the Melbourne Cricket Ground and he played the remaining match of the season to finish with three matches and three goals for the season. After the AFL season finished, he played in Casey's finals campaign, including the grand final loss to Footscray at Etihad Stadium.

Following the conclusion of the 2022 AFL season, Weideman was traded to Essendon in search of more opportunities as a key forward. Weidemen played 17 games over two seasons for Essendon before being delisted at the end of the 2024 season.

In 2025 Weideman returned to his roots suiting up with Vermont.

== Statistics ==
Legend
G	Goals	K	Kicks	D	Disposals	T	Tackles
B	Behinds	H	Handballs	M	Marks

Season	Team	No.	Games	Totals							Averages (per game)							Votes
Season	Team	No.	Games	G	B	K	H	D	M	T	G	B	K	H	D	M	T	Votes
2016	Melbourne	26	3	3	0	8	17	25	9	0	1.0	0.0	2.7	5.7	8.3	3.0	0.0	0
2017	Melbourne	26	7	3	4	24	32	56	18	12	0.4	0.6	3.4	4.6	8.0	2.6	1.7	0
2018	Melbourne	26	10	10	5	57	58	115	40	24	1.0	0.5	5.7	5.8	11.5	4.0	2.4	0
2019	Melbourne	26	11	11	8	60	53	113	46	16	1.0	0.7	5.5	4.8	10.3	4.2	1.5	0
2020 (Note: The 2020 season was played with 17 home-and-away matches per team (down from 22) and 16-minute quarters with time on (down from 20-minute quarters with time on) due to the impact of the COVID-19 pandemic.)	Melbourne	26	13	19	8	59	40	99	41	6	1.5	0.6	4.5	3.1	7.6	3.2	0.5	0
2021	Melbourne	26	5	3	4	19	21	40	16	9	0.6	0.8	3.8	4.2	8.0	3.2	1.8	0
2022	Melbourne	26	10	13	6	46	37	83	28	14	1.3	0.6	4.6	3.7	8.3	2.8	1.4	0
2023	Essendon	10	16	15	15	86	59	145	65	18	0.9	0.9	5.4	3.7	9.1	4.1	1.1	0
2024	Essendon	10	1	0	0	4	5	9	2	0	0.0	0.0	4.0	5.0	9.0	2.0	0.0	0
2025	Essendon	10	0	—	—	—	—	—	—	—	—	—	—	—	—	—	—	0
Career			76	77	50	363	322	685	265	99	1.0	0.7	4.8	4.2	9.0	3.5	1.3	0
