= Jayden Hunt =

Australian rules footballer (born 1995)

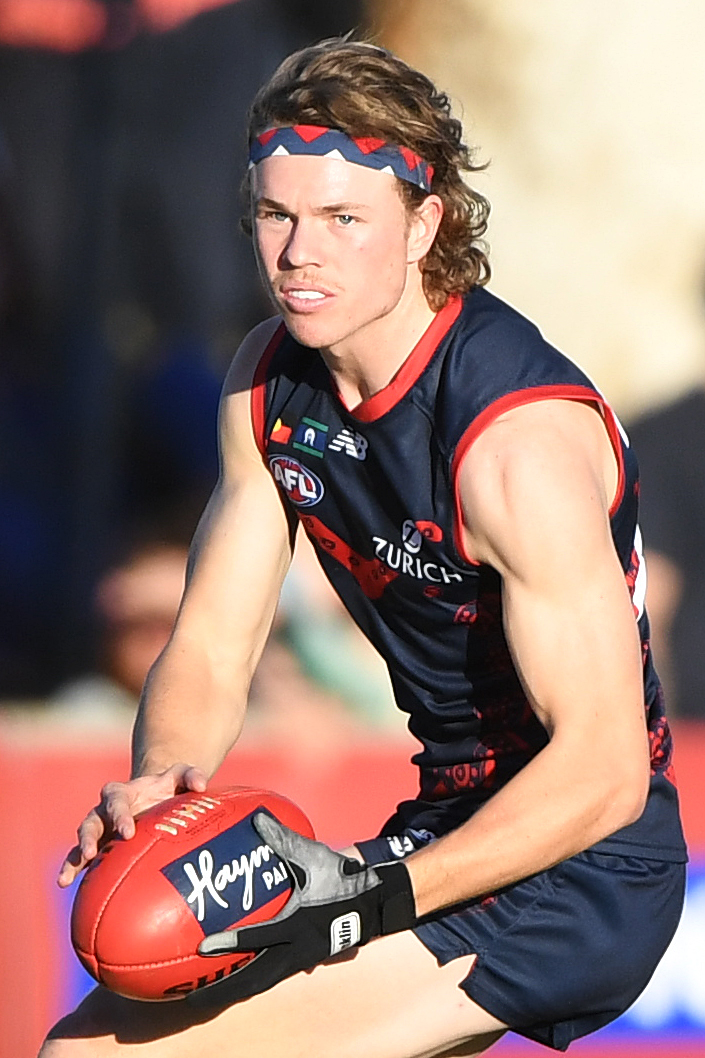
- Hunt playing for Melbourne in July 2019

Personal information
- Full name: Jayden Hunt
- Born: 3 April 1995 (age 31)
- Original team: Brighton Grammar (APS)/East Sandringham Zebras (SMJFL)
- Draft: No. 57, 2013 national draft
- Debut: Round 4, 2016, Melbourne vs. Collingwood, at MCG
- Height: 187 cm (6 ft 2 in)
- Weight: 82 kg (181 lb)
- Position: Defender

Playing career
Years	Club	Games (Goals)
2014–2022	Melbourne	114 (43)
2023–2025	West Coast	58 (15)
Total		172 (58)

Career highlights
- Harold Ball Memorial Trophy: 2016; 22under22 team: 2017

Jayden Hunt (born 3 April 1995) is a former professional Australian rules footballer who played for Melbourne and West Coast in the Australian Football League (AFL). A defender, Hunt played primarily on the half-back flank with the ability to also play on the wing.

He was born into an Australian rules football family, with both his great-uncle and uncle playing in the Victorian Football League (now the Australian Football League). He played his final junior football year in school sports and did not play any football at under-18 level. Despite this, he was recruited by the Melbourne Football Club with the fifty-seventh selection in the 2013 AFL draft. After persistent injuries in his first two years, he made his AFL debut during the 2016 season.

== Early life ==
Hunt was born into a football family with his great-uncle, Harold Rumney, playing 186 games in the Victorian Football League (now the Australian Football League) for the Collingwood Football Club and Carlton Football Club, including four premierships with Collingwood between 1927 and 1930; and his uncle, Andrew Moir, played 73 matches for the Melbourne Football Club from 1977–1981. He played under 16 level football with the Hampton Rovers Football Club in 2011 before playing school football with Brighton Grammar School. Playing in the Associated Public Schools of Victoria (APS) competition during his draft year, he did not play in the TAC Cup or under 18 championships that year. His only representative match for the year was the APS vs. Associated Grammar Schools of Victoria (AGSV) match.

== AFL career ==
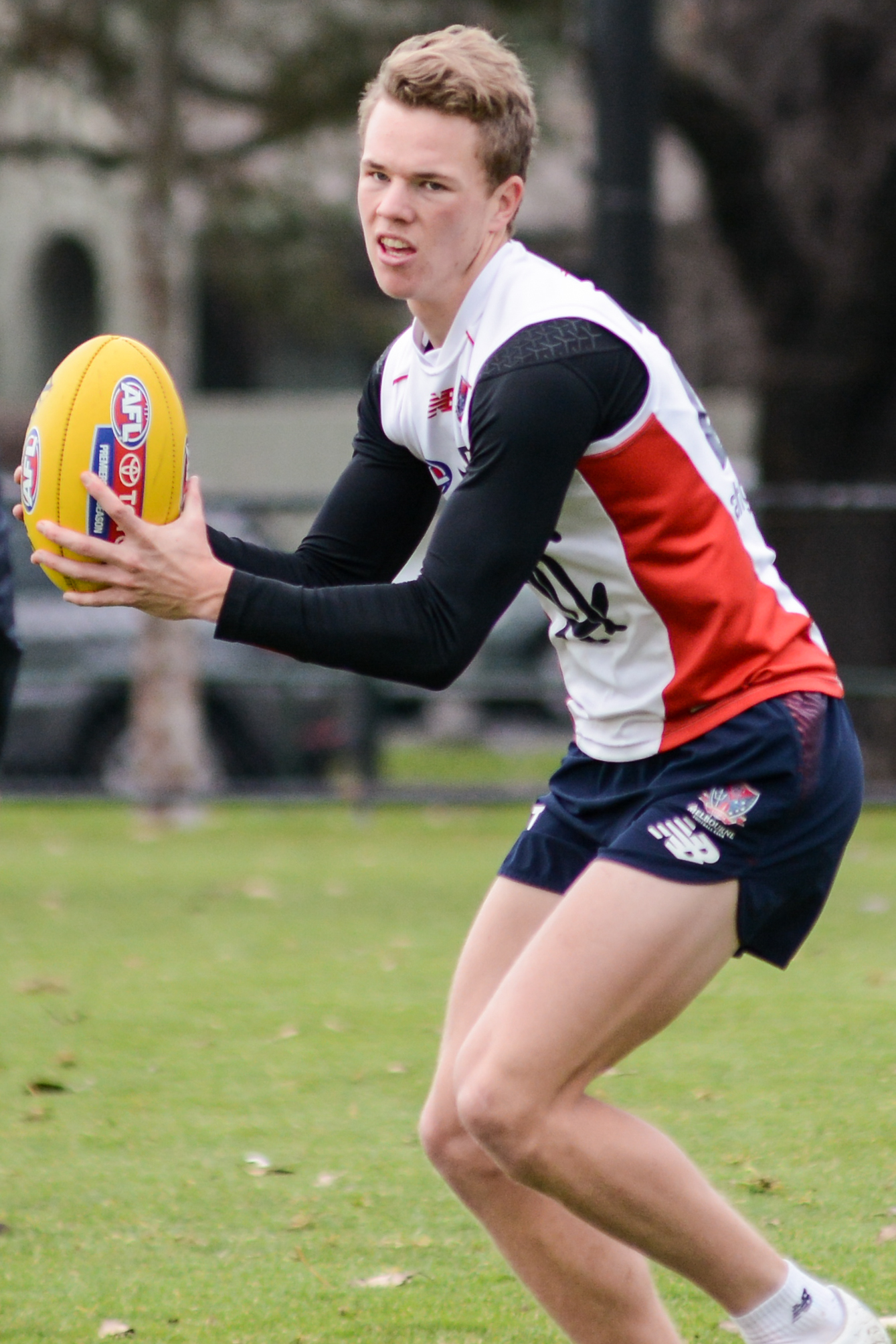
Hunt at training in July 2015

Playing just the one representative match for the year, Hunt was drafted by the Melbourne Football Club with their third selection and fifty-seventh overall in the 2013 national draft, he was the only player in the draft to not play any football at under 18-level. He was labelled as the draft smoky and Herald Sun journalist, Sam Landsberger, noted he was "plucked from relative obscurity". After playing the first six matches in the Victorian Football League (VFL) for Melbourne's affiliate team, the Casey Scorpions in 2014, he was sidelined for over a year after suffering from a back injury and a broken jaw which he injured in June 2015. He returned to the VFL in July and played the remainder of the season, including the elimination final loss against Essendon.

Hunt had his first uninterrupted pre-season in the lead-up to the 2016 season and played the first two matches of the NAB Challenge. He made his AFL debut in the 35-point win against Collingwood in round four at the Melbourne Cricket Ground. Regarded for his speed, he received high praise during his eleventh match in round 15 against Adelaide, which was described as his break-out match by Fox Sports Australia journalist, Julian De Stoop, and then-Melbourne coach, Paul Roos, stated it was "as good a 12-possession game as [he'd] ever seen". The next week, he recorded a then-career-high twenty-nine disposals and eight inside-50s in the 32-point win against Fremantle at TIO Stadium. Despite being eligible for the AFL Rising Star, he entered the final round of the season without a nomination, which caused Paul Roos to criticise the Rising Star process, stating "it would be a travesty if he did not receive a nomination" and proclaim he "could be the best young player in the competition". He ultimately missed out on a nomination, which led to Fox Sports Australia naming him the unluckiest player to miss a nomination. He did not miss a match following his debut and he finished with nineteen matches for the season. His season was rewarded with the Harold Ball Memorial Trophy as Melbourne's best young player, and an eleventh-place finish in the best and fairest count.

Hunt struggled to maintain a place in Melbourne’s side over the following years, and was listed only as an emergency in the club’s 2021 grand final win. The following year, he exercised his rights as a free agent and moved to West Coast. After three seasons and 58 games with the Eagles, who finished as the wooden spooners in 2025, Hunt retired, having played 172 games across his career. Reflecting on his journey, he said: “While it’s been tough on the field, I’ve enjoyed the challenges and I’m excited to see what the future holds for this promising young group.”

In 2026, Hunt made his debut for the Los Angeles Dragons in the USAFL. The Dragons won the 2026 Division II Premiership, where Hunt placed second in voting for best on ground, following first-year American rookie Stuart Gill.

== Statistics ==
Legend
G	Goals	K	Kicks	D	Disposals	T	Tackles
B	Behinds	H	Handballs	M	Marks

Season	Team	No.	Games	Totals							Averages (per game)							Votes
Season	Team	No.	Games	G	B	K	H	D	M	T	G	B	K	H	D	M	T	Votes
2014	Melbourne	29	0	—	—	—	—	—	—	—	—	—	—	—	—	—	—	0
2015	Melbourne	29	0	—	—	—	—	—	—	—	—	—	—	—	—	—	—	0
2016	Melbourne	29	19	3	1	159	137	296	59	41	0.2	0.1	8.4	7.2	15.6	3.1	2.2	1
2017	Melbourne	29	22	7	5	254	142	396	85	69	0.3	0.2	11.5	6.5	18.0	3.9	3.1	0
2018	Melbourne	29	6	0	2	49	22	71	22	14	0.0	0.3	8.2	3.7	11.8	3.7	2.3	0
2019	Melbourne	29	21	21	10	157	95	252	77	46	1.0	0.5	7.5	4.5	12.0	3.7	2.2	0
2020 (Note: The 2020 season was played with 17 home-and-away matches per team (down from 22) and 16-minute quarters with time on (down from 20-minute quarters with time on) due to the impact of the COVID-19 pandemic.)	Melbourne	29	6	10	2	27	8	35	10	7	1.7	0.3	4.5	1.3	5.8	1.7	1.2	0
2021 (Note: 2021 statistics include one game in which Hunt was substituted out of the game due to injury (round 21).)	Melbourne	29	20	2	3	179	95	274	64	49	0.1	0.2	9.0	4.8	13.7	3.2	2.5	0
2022 (Note: 2022 statistics include two games in which Hunt was an unused medical substitute (rounds 15 and 17).)	Melbourne	29	20	0	2	134	66	200	52	27	0.0	0.1	6.7	3.3	10.0	2.6	1.4	0
2023	West Coast	5	23	7	8	283	147	430	125	54	0.3	0.3	12.3	6.4	18.7	5.4	2.3	0
2024	West Coast	5	20	3	3	213	112	325	72	42	0.2	0.2	10.7	5.6	16.3	3.6	2.1	0
2025	West Coast	5	15	5	5	101	83	184	30	25	0.3	0.3	6.7	5.5	12.3	2.0	1.7	0
Career			172	58	41	1556	907	2463	596	374	0.3	0.2	9.0	5.3	14.3	3.5	2.2	1

== Honours and achievements ==
Team

- McClelland Trophy (Melbourne): 2021

Individual

- Harold Ball Memorial Trophy: 2016
- 22under22 team: 2017
