= Jack Newnes (Australian footballer) =

Australian rules footballer

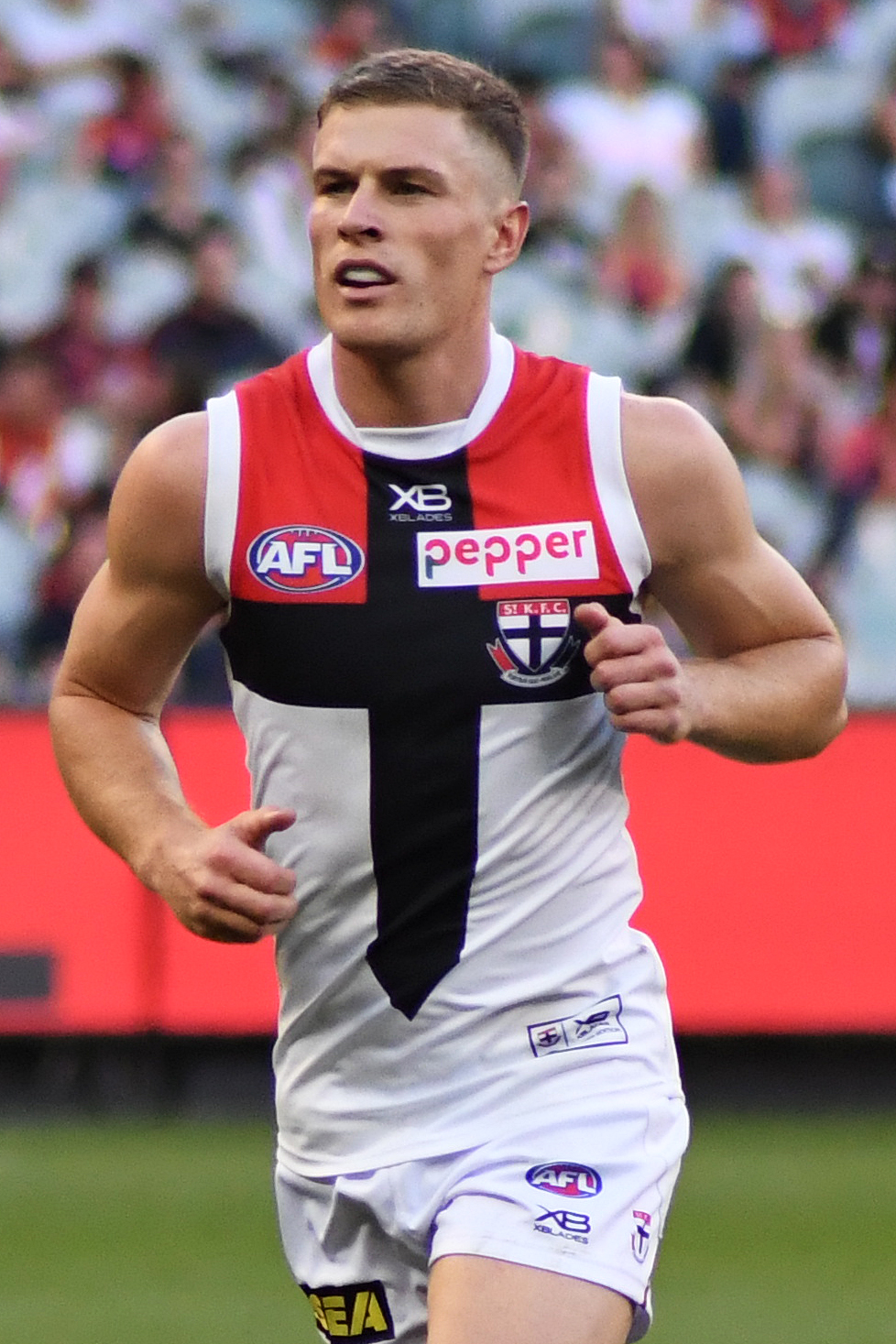
- Newnes playing for St Kilda in April 2019

Personal information
- Full name: Jack Newnes
- Nickname: Newnesy
- Born: 24 February 1993 (age 33)
- Original team: Northern Knights (TAC Cup)
- Draft: No. 37, 2011 National Draft, St Kilda
- Height: 186 cm (6 ft 1 in)
- Weight: 82 kg (181 lb)
- Position: Midfielder

Playing career^{1}
Years	Club	Games (Goals)
2012–2019	St Kilda	155 (55)
2020–2022	Carlton	52 (21)
Total		207 (76)
- ^{1} Playing statistics correct to the end of round 15 2022.

Jack Newnes is a former professional Australian rules footballer who played for the St Kilda Football Club and Carlton Football Club in the Australian Football League (AFL).

== Early life and career ==
Newnes went to St Anthony's Primary School in Alphington, Melbourne. As a youth, he played for Ivanhoe Junior Football Club in the Yarra Junior Football League, and for the Northern Knights in the TAC Cup. He was recruited to the AFL with pick 37 in the 2011 National Draft by the St Kilda Football Club. He attended secondary school at Marcellin College in Bulleen.

Newnes made his debut in Round 2 of the 2012 season against Gold Coast. After seven games in his debut season, he became a mainstay of the senior team for the rest of his time at St Kilda. He played a club equal-record 123 consecutive senior games from 2014 to 2019 and was a member of the club's leadership group for four seasons from 2015 until 2018. He played primarily as a wingman or utility flanker, noted for his effective link play and accurate field kicking. Despite still playing 20 out of 22 games in the season, Newnes turned down a two-year contract and asked to be delisted at the conclusion of the 2019 AFL season in order to join Carlton.

Newnes then joined Carlton, signing as a delisted free agent, from the 2020 season. He became a mainstay of the Carlton team in the pandemic-interrupted season as a wing/half-back, playing all 17 games. In Round 12, 2020, he kicked a goal after the siren to win the game by four points against Fremantle at Optus Stadium: the high difficulty kick, which came from outside the right boundary line at the 50-metre arc and required him to shoo away a cameraman and move camera cables out of his run-up, was one of three finalists for the AFL Goal of the Year award. He played 19 games in 2021, reducing to 16 games in 2022 for a total of 52 for the club; he was delisted at the conclusion of the 2022 AFL season.

== AFL statistics ==
Statistics are correct to the end of round 18, 2020

Legend
G	Goals	K	Kicks	D	Disposals	T	Tackles
B	Behinds	H	Handballs	M	Marks

Season	Team	No.	Games	Totals							Averages (per game)						
Season	Team	No.	Games	G	B	K	H	D	M	T	G	B	K	H	D	M	T
2012	St Kilda	16	7	1	0	55	31	86	24	19	0.1	0.0	7.9	4.4	12.3	3.4	2.7
2013	St Kilda	16	18	0	2	157	116	273	81	42	0.0	0.1	8.7	6.4	15.2	4.5	2.3
2014	St Kilda	16	22	3	4	245	192	437	123	85	0.1	0.2	11.1	8.7	19.9	5.6	3.9
2015	St Kilda	16	22	6	7	262	187	449	132	83	0.3	0.3	11.9	8.5	20.4	6.0	3.8
2016	St Kilda	16	22	15	3	307	205	512	98	66	0.7	0.1	14.0	9.3	23.3	4.5	3.0
2017	St Kilda	16	22	7	10	293	212	505	124	68	0.3	0.5	13.3	9.6	23.0	5.6	3.1
2018	St Kilda	16	22	18	17	213	132	345	101	47	0.8	0.8	9.7	6.0	15.7	4.6	2.1
2019	St Kilda	16	20	5	10	218	128	346	89	53	0.3	0.5	10.9	6.4	17.3	4.5	2.7
2020	Carlton	32	17	13	4	139	83	222	53	44	0.8	0.2	8.2	4.9	13.1	3.1	2.6
Career			172	68	57	1889	1286	3175	825	507	0.4	0.3	11.0	7.5	18.5	4.8	2.9
