= Mark Weideman =

Australian rules footballer

Personal information
- Full name: Mark Weideman
- Born: 30 December 1961 (age 64)
- Original team: West Adelaide (SANFL)
- Height: 188 cm (6 ft 2 in)
- Weight: 92 kg (203 lb)

Playing career^{1}
Years	Club	Games (Goals)
1981–1984	Collingwood	28 (34)
- ^{1} Playing statistics correct to the end of 1984.

Mark Weideman (born 30 December 1961) is a former Australian rules footballer who played with Collingwood in the Victorian Football League (VFL).

Weideman was just 16 when he made his senior debut for South Australian National Football League (SANFL) club West Adelaide in 1978. His father, Murray Weideman, had coached the club earlier in the decade, after an 11-year career at Collingwood. Weideman followed in his father's footsteps and played 28 games for Collingwood over four seasons. He played 20 of those games in his debut season in 1981, which included their preliminary final win over Geelong, but he wasn't selected in the Grand Final team, his spot taken by captain Peter Moore, who was returning from injury.

Used by Collingwood up forward and as a ruckman, Weideman was never again a regular fixture in the team, appearing twice in 1982, five times in 1983 and just once in 1984. Weideman later had success with Victorian Football Association (VFA) club Coburg. He won their best and fairest award in 1987, played in back to back premierships in 1988/1989 and was named on the interchange bench in Coburg's official Team of the Century.
