= Mitch Honeychurch =

Australian rules footballer

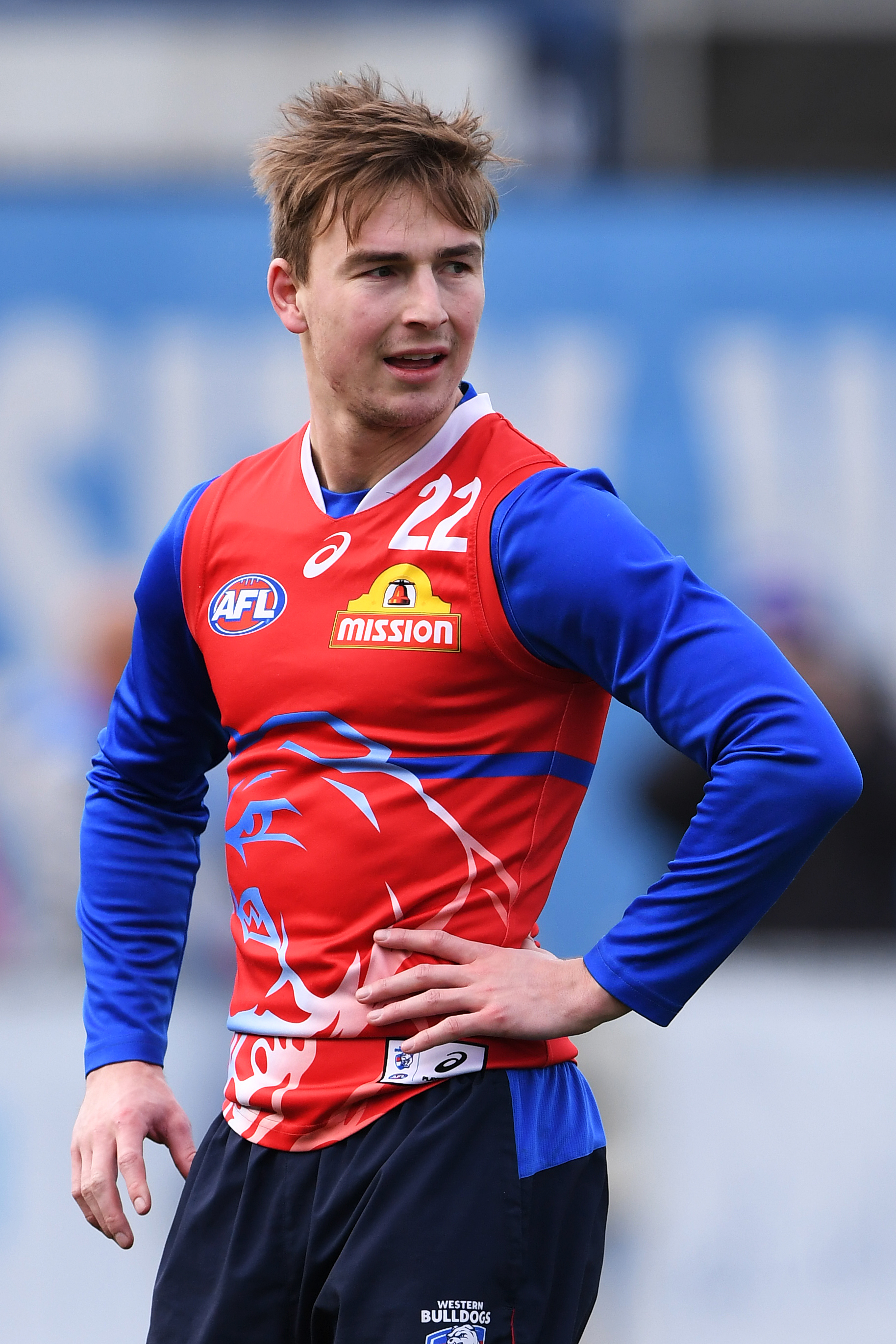
- Honeychurch in August 2018

Personal information
- Full name: Mitchell Honeychurch
- Born: 2 March 1995 (age 31)
- Original team: Eastern Ranges (TAC Cup)
- Draft: No. 60, 2013 National Draft
- Height: 176 cm (5 ft 9 in)
- Weight: 71 kg (157 lb)
- Position: Midfielder/forward

Playing career^{1}
Years	Club	Games (Goals)
2014–2018	Western Bulldogs	35 (15)
- ^{1} Playing statistics correct to the end of 2018.

Career highlights
- 2015 AFL Rising Star nominee; VFL premiership player: 2014, 2016

Mitchell Honeychurch (born 2 March 1995) is a former Australian rules footballer who played for the Western Bulldogs in the Australian Football League (AFL). Honeychurch played for the Eastern Ranges in the TAC Cup, and represented Vic Metro during the National Under 18 Championships. Honeychurch was named in the Under 18 All Australian team, and won Vic Metro's Most Valuable Player after a series of strong performances for Metro. Honeychurch played in the Ranges' TAC Cup Grand Final win over the Dandenong Stingrays, booting 3 goals and named as one of the best afield. While ranked by Champion Data as the fifteenth most impressive player in the draft pool, Honeychurch slid to Pick 60 in the 2013 AFL draft, taking the Bulldogs (the club that had displayed the most interest in Honeychurch) by surprise.

== AFL career ==
Honeychurch debuted against Melbourne Football Club in Round 15 of the 2014 AFL season. The Bulldogs clinched victory in the dying minutes of the game with a Goal of the Year contender from Honeychurch's fellow first year player Marcus Bontempelli. Honeychurch kicked the opening goal for the Bulldogs with his first kick - thus joining the elite group of first kick, first goal players - and finished with 8 disposals for the match. Honeychurch would go on to hold his spot in the side for the next two weeks, but didn't play again at AFL level in 2014. He did however play a pivotal role in securing the VFL Premiership for Footscray - their first since 1954.

Under new coach Luke Beveridge, Honeychurch flourished early on in the 2015 season, playing and impressing in the first seven games of the season, and was awarded the Round 2 nomination for the 2015 AFL Rising Star award, following a strong performance in the Bulldogs' win over Richmond at the MCG where he accumulated 18 disposals, six tackles and a goal.
