= Aaron Young (footballer) =

Australian rules footballer (born 1992)

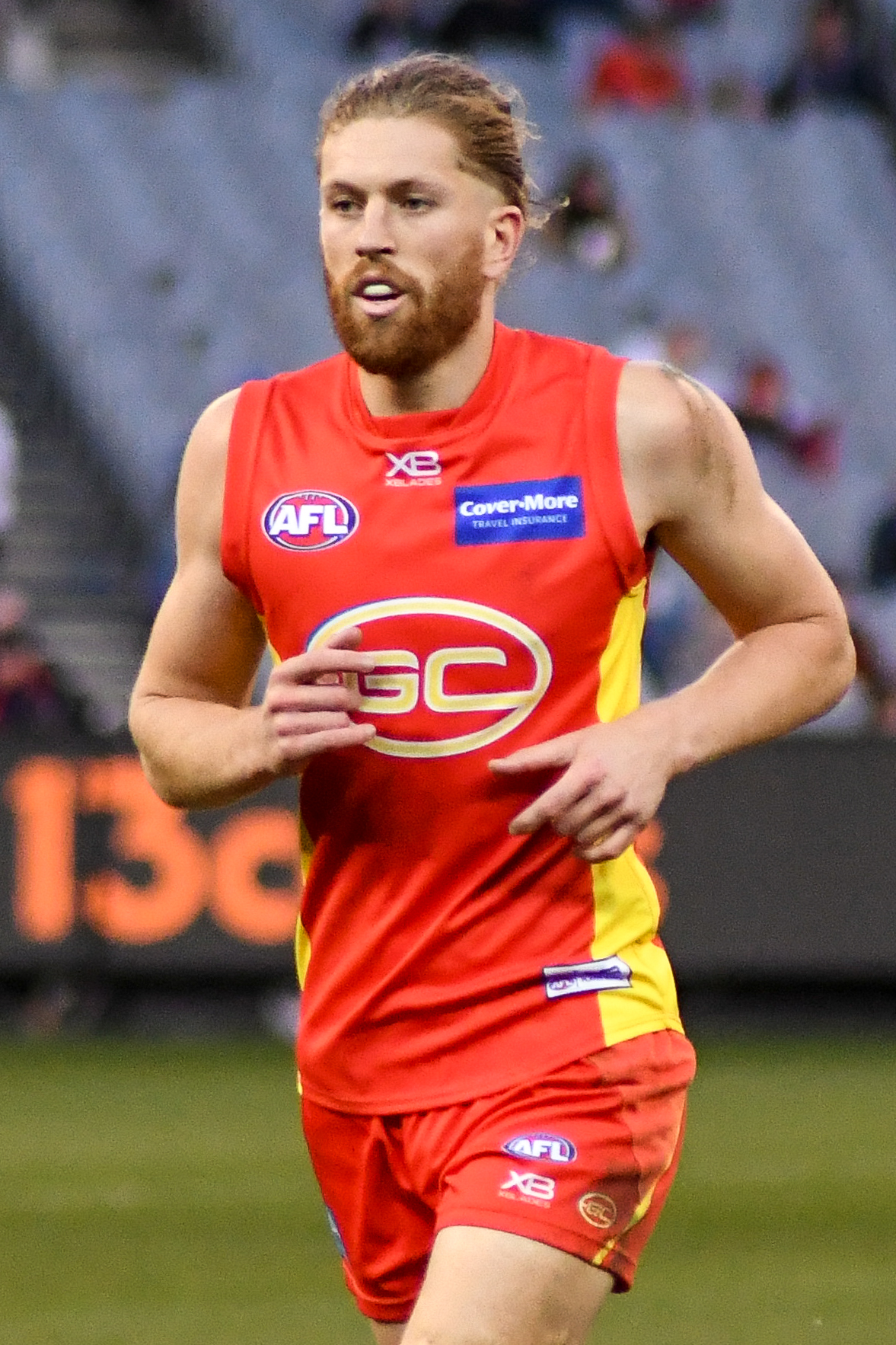
- Young playing for Gold Coast in August 2018

Personal information
- Full name: Aaron Young
- Born: 6 December 1992 (age 33)
- Original team: Eastern Ranges (TAC Cup)
- Draft: No. 36, 2010 national draft
- Height: 189 cm (6 ft 2 in)
- Weight: 84 kg (185 lb)
- Position: Forward

Club information
- Current club: Gold Coast
- Number: 15

Playing career^{1}
Years	Club	Games (Goals)
2012–2017	Port Adelaide	76 (62)
2018-2019	Gold Coast	24 (21)
Total		100 (83)
- ^{1} Playing statistics correct to the end of 2019.

Career highlights
- Magarey Medal: 2022 (SANFL)

Aaron Young (born 6 December 1992) is a former professional Australian rules footballer who played for the Gold Coast Football Club in the Australian Football League (AFL). He was originally drafted by the Port Adelaide Football Club with pick number 36 in the 2010 national draft, having previously played for the Eastern Ranges in the TAC Cup. He made his debut in round 5, 2012, against Adelaide at Football Park in Showdown XXXII.

Early in his career, Young was used heavily as a substitute player. Already difficult to match up on due to his height and pace, Young would come on as a substitute later in the game and take advantage of his speed and fresh legs. Young started 21 of his first 42 games wearing the green substitute vest, the most starts as substitute for any player. The substitute rule was scrapped in 2016 and that same year Young had a breakout season playing 21 games and kicking 37 goals; one goal less than Port's leading goal kicker Chad Wingard.

Young struggled to get a regular game in 2017, and at the end of that season was traded to the Gold Coast Football Club. Young played 22 games and kicked 20 goals in his first season at the Suns. An injury plagued season in 2019 saw Young delisted. In 2020 Young joined the Aspley Football Club in the NEAFL.

In November 2020, Young signed with SANFL club North Adelaide and has been a standout in the Roosters' midfield.

In 2022, Young won the Magarey Medal as the Best & Fairest player overall in the SANFL. He finished on 23 votes, 1 vote ahead of the next best.
