= Maverick Weller =

Australian rules footballer

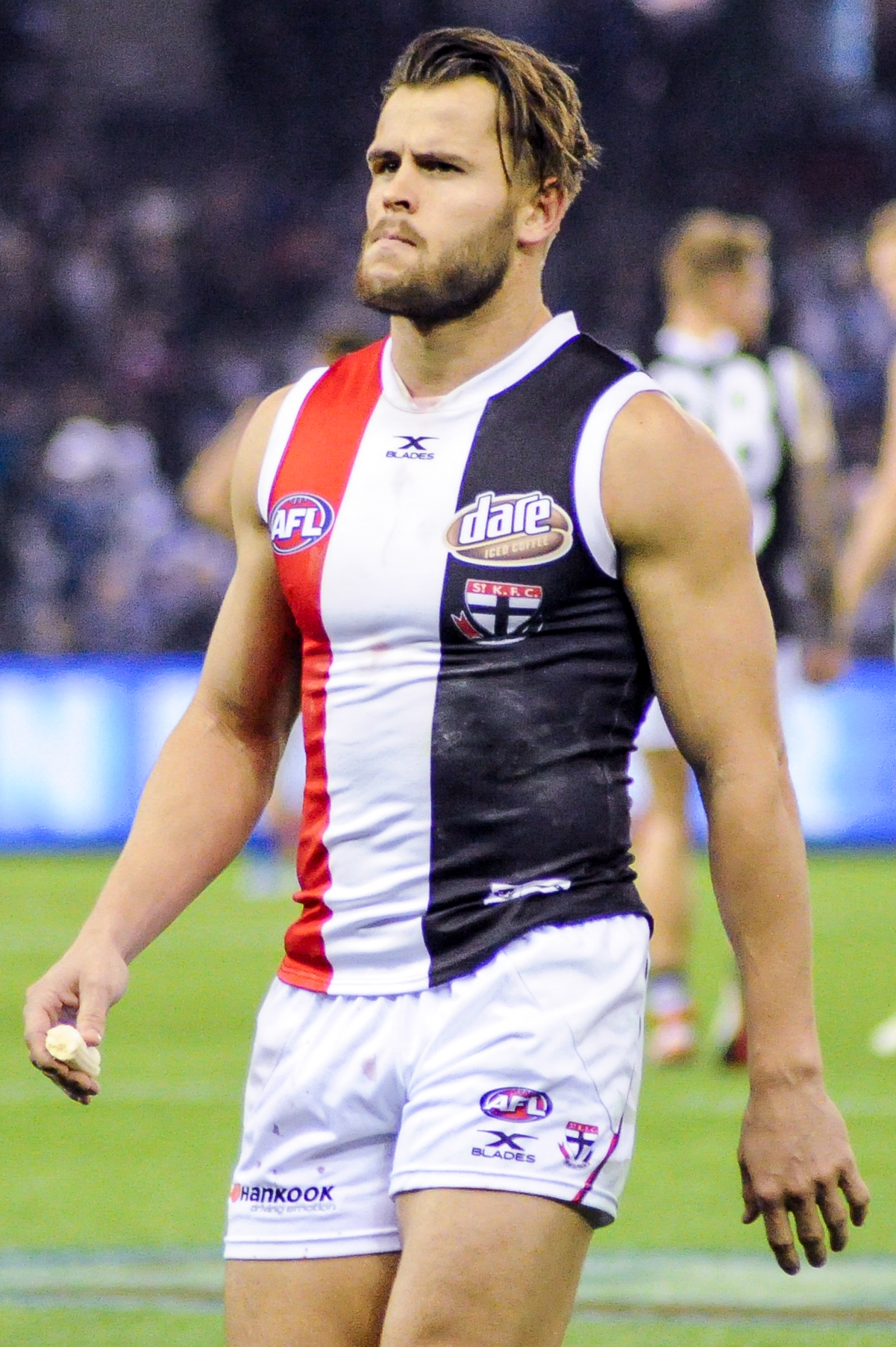
- Weller with St Kilda in June 2017

Personal information
- Full name: Maverick Weller
- Nickname: Mav
- Born: 13 February 1992 (age 34); Tasmania
- Original team: Burnie(TSL)
- Draft: No. 20, 2014 AFL rookie draft: St Kilda
- Height: 182 cm (6 ft 0 in)
- Weight: 85 kg (187 lb)
- Position: Midfielder/forward

Playing career^{1}
| Years | Club | Games (Goals) |
| 2011–2013 | Gold Coast | 32 (3) |
| 2014–2018 | St Kilda | 89 (55) |
| 2019 | Richmond | 2 (1) |
| Total | | 123 (59) |
- ^{1} Playing statistics correct to the end of 2019.

Career highlights
- VFL: VFL premiership player: 2019

Maverick Weller (born 13 February 1992) is a former professional Australian rules footballer who played for the Gold Coast Suns, St Kilda Football Club and Richmond Football Club in the Australian Football League (AFL). He currently plays and coaches for the Penguin Football Club in the North West Football League (NWFL).

== Career ==
=== Gold Coast (2011–2013) ===
Weller was pre-signed to the expansion club Gold Coast as a 17-year-old, after playing junior football at Burnie in the Tasmanian State League. He spent 2010 playing for Gold Coast in the VFL one year prior to their AFL entry. He made his AFL debut against the Western Bulldogs in round 3 of the 2011 season. Weller also featured in the Gold Coast's first ever win over Port Adelaide at AAMI Stadium on 23 April 2011.

Weller was delisted by the Suns on 2 September 2013 after playing just four games in the 2013 AFL season.

=== St Kilda (2014–2018) ===
Weller was taken in the 2013 Rookie Draft by St Kilda. He was elevated off the rookie list during the 2014 season, debuting in round 7. In his first season, Weller played 16 games and kicked three goals.

In 2015, Weller was named in St Kilda's leadership group along with captain Nick Riewoldt and fellow players Leigh Montagna, Sean Dempster, Jarryn Geary, David Armitage and Jack Newnes. He played 20 matches and kicked 12 goals in his second season with the Saints. Weller received a one-match ban for an off-the-ball hit on Brisbane's Rohan Bewick in round 9.

Prior to the 2016 season, Weller signed a contract extension with St Kilda, committing to the club until the end of the 2018 season. He was criticised for comments he made about former coach, Guy McKenna, but insisted these comments were taken out of context and has no negative feelings towards McKenna. Weller played his 50th game for St Kilda in the club's round 14, 2016 win against Geelong.

Weller remained a part of St Kilda's leadership group for the 2017 season, with players Seb Ross, Josh Bruce and Dylan Roberton joining the eight-man group. He played 18 matches (nine wins, nine losses) for the season. He suffered an ankle injury in round 6, which kept him sidelined for the Saints' win over the GWS Giants in round 7. He was omitted from the senior side for three matches later in the season, before returning in round 19. Weller kicked his 50th career goal in the Saints' round 10 loss to the Western Bulldogs.

Weller was delisted by the Saints at the end of the 2018 season.

=== Richmond (2019) ===
In November 2018 the Richmond Football Club signed Weller to a rookie contract under the AFL's newly introduce pre-season supplemental selection rule. Weller played in both of the club's AFL pre-season matches, kicking three goals across the two matches. He made his AFL debut for the club in round 1, kicking one goal. Weller played again for the club's AFL side in round 2, before being dropped to VFL level to play out the remainder of the season with the club's VFL side.

Weller announced his retirement from AFL football in September of that year, playing his last match for the club at VFL level in a victorious VFL grand final.

== Statistics ==
Legend
| G | Goals | K | Kicks | D | Disposals | T | Tackles |
| B | Behinds | H | Handballs | M | Marks |

| Season | Team | No. | Games | Totals | | | | | | | Averages (per game) | | | | | | |
| Season | Team | No. | Games | G | B | K | H | D | M | T | G | B | K | H | D | M | T |
|---|---|---|---|---|---|---|---|---|---|---|---|---|---|---|---|---|---|
| 2011 | Gold Coast | 4 | 15 | 2 | 2 | 88 | 115 | 203 | 36 | 37 | 0.1 | 0.1 | 5.9 | 7.7 | 13.5 | 2.4 | 2.5 |
| 2012 | Gold Coast | 4 | 13 | 1 | 2 | 84 | 100 | 184 | 47 | 29 | 0.1 | 0.2 | 6.5 | 7.7 | 14.2 | 3.6 | 2.2 |
| 2013 | Gold Coast | 4 | 4 | 0 | 1 | 34 | 35 | 69 | 22 | 11 | 0.0 | 0.3 | 8.5 | 8.8 | 17.3 | 5.5 | 2.8 |
| 2014 | St Kilda | 44 | 16 | 3 | 7 | 110 | 129 | 239 | 40 | 74 | 0.2 | 0.4 | 6.9 | 8.1 | 14.9 | 2.5 | 4.6 |
| 2015 | St Kilda | 44 | 20 | 12 | 12 | 164 | 175 | 339 | 67 | 100 | 0.6 | 0.6 | 8.2 | 8.8 | 17.0 | 3.4 | 5.0 |
| 2016 | St Kilda | 44 | 22 | 24 | 19 | 179 | 181 | 360 | 85 | 84 | 1.1 | 0.9 | 8.1 | 8.2 | 16.4 | 3.9 | 3.8 |
| 2017 | St Kilda | 44 | 18 | 11 | 18 | 139 | 158 | 297 | 73 | 62 | 0.6 | 1.0 | 7.7 | 8.8 | 16.5 | 4.1 | 3.4 |
| 2018 | St Kilda | 44 | 13 | 5 | 7 | 88 | 112 | 200 | 54 | 49 | 0.4 | 0.5 | 6.8 | 8.6 | 15.4 | 4.2 | 3.8 |
| 2019 | Richmond | 16 | 2 | 1 | 1 | 17 | 14 | 31 | 6 | 2 | 0.5 | 0.5 | 8.5 | 7.0 | 15.5 | 3.0 | 1.0 |
| Career | | | 123 | 59 | 69 | 903 | 1019 | 1922 | 430 | 448 | 0.5 | 0.6 | 7.3 | 8.3 | 15.6 | 3.5 | 3.6 |

== Personal life ==
Weller attended Marist Regional College in Burnie, Tasmania. He completed his final year of school at All Saints Anglican School in Gold Coast. He has a younger brother, Lachie Weller, who currently plays for Gold Coast Suns.
