= Kade Stewart =

Australian rules footballer (born 1997)

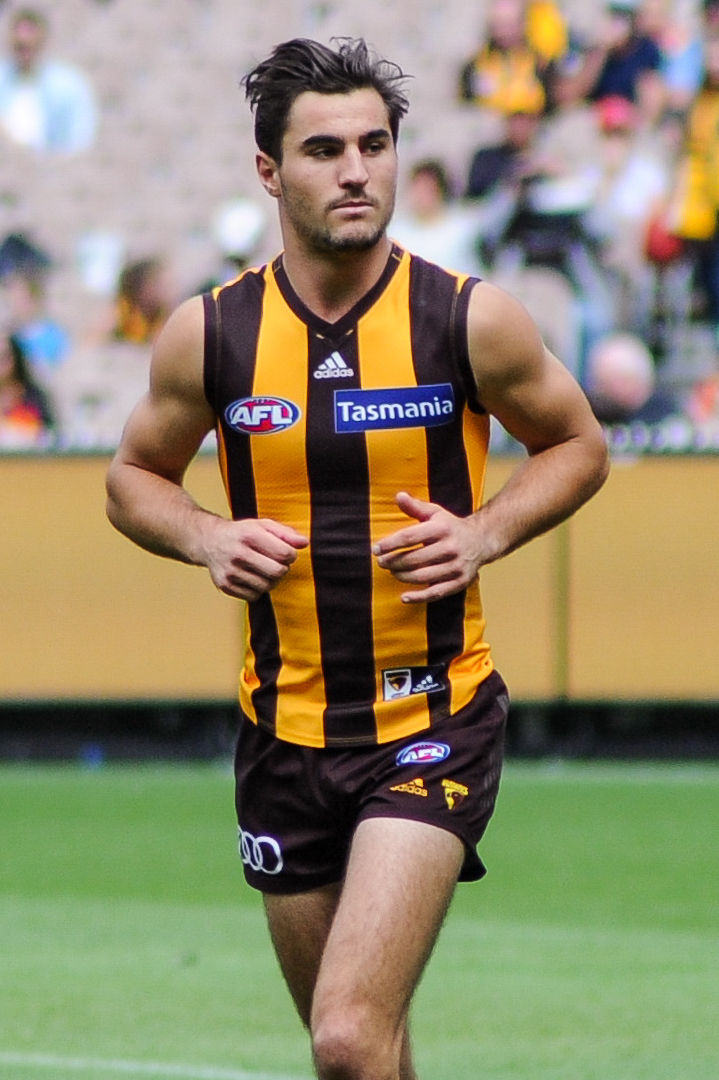
- Stewart in April 2017

Personal information
- Full name: Kade Stewart
- Born: 16 January 1997 (age 29); Katanning, Western Australia
- Original teams: Katanning, South Fremantle
- Draft: No. 36, 2016 rookie draft
- Debut: Round 11, 2016, Hawthorn vs. Melbourne, at Melbourne Cricket Ground
- Height: 180 cm (5 ft 11 in)
- Weight: 67 kg (148 lb)
- Position: Forward/Midfielder

Playing career^{1}
Years	Club	Games (Goals)
2016–2017	Hawthorn	7 (5)
- ^{1} Playing statistics correct to the end of 2017.

Career highlights
- Box Hill leading goalkicker: 2016

Kade Stewart (born 16 January 1997) is a former professional Australian rules footballer who played for the Hawthorn Football Club in the Australian Football League (AFL)

== Early career ==
Stewart made the recruiters notice after a starring performance for WA in the 2013 NAB Under-16 Championships. Kade was named WA’s most valuable player for the carnival. With dedication and support from his family, Kade and his family made the six-hour round trip from Katanning to training in Perth twice a week. In 2013 he made his senior debut for the Katanning Wanderers in the Upper Great Southern Football League. He continued to impress recruiters by good display of form in the 2014 and 2015 NAB AFL Under-18 Championships.

Stewart played two senior West Australian Football League games late in 2015 for South Fremantle where he averaged 18 possessions a game.

== AFL career ==
Kade Stewart was selected with 2nd round pick 36 in 2016 AFL rookie draft.

Hawthorn's Recruiting and List Manager Graham Wright said, "Kade's an AFL Academy player, he is also a left-footer, a very good user of the ball and good overhead mark for his size."

Hawthorn upgraded Stewart from rookie to its senior list on 1 June 2016, after Ryan Burton was placed on the long-term injury list. He then made his AFL debut in round 11 of the 2016 AFL season against Melbourne.

He was delisted by Hawthorn at the conclusion of the 2017 season.

== Statistics ==
Legend
G	Goals	K	Kicks	D	Disposals	T	Tackles
B	Behinds	H	Handballs	M	Marks

Season	Team	No.	Games	Totals							Averages (per game)							Votes
Season	Team	No.	Games	G	B	K	H	D	M	T	G	B	K	H	D	M	T	Votes
2016	Hawthorn	40	3	3	1	22	14	36	9	12	1.0	0.3	7.3	4.7	12.0	3.0	4.0	0
2017	Hawthorn	40	4	2	1	15	19	34	7	16	0.5	0.1	3.8	4.8	8.5	1.8	4.0	0
Career			6	5	2	37	33	70	16	28	0.7	0.3	5.3	4.7	10.0	2.3	4.0	0

== Honours and achievements ==
Individual

- Box Hill leading goalkicker: 2016
