= Andrew McGrath =

Australian rules footballer

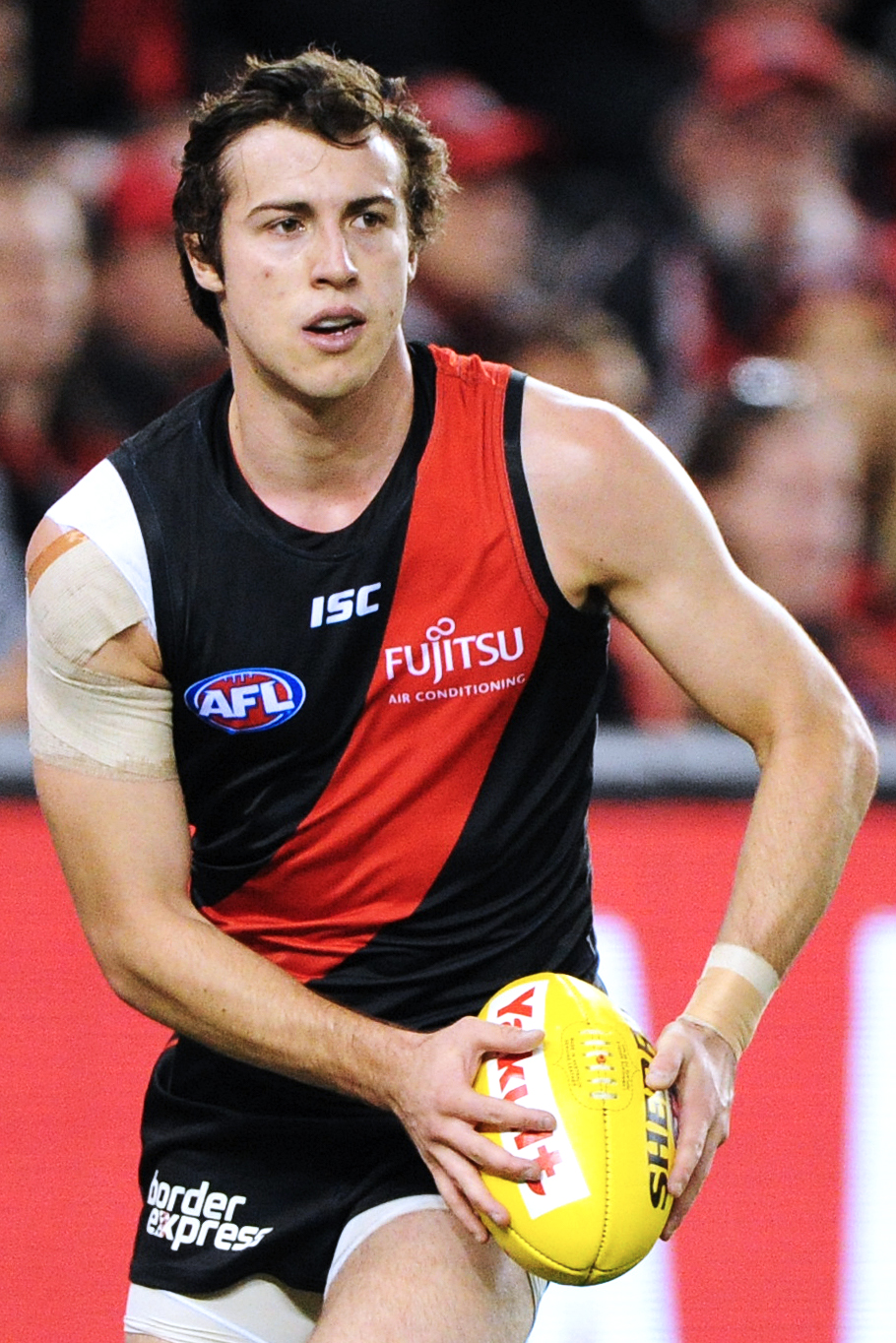
- McGrath playing for Essendon in 2018

Personal information
- Full name: Andrew McGrath
- Born: 2 June 1998 (age 28); Mississauga, Ontario, Canada
- Original team: Sandringham Dragons (TAC Cup)/Brighton Grammar (APS)
- Draft: No. 1, 2016 national draft
- Height: 180 cm (5 ft 11 in)
- Weight: 83 kg (183 lb)
- Position: Defender / midfielder

Club information
- Current club: Essendon
- Number: 1

Playing career^{1}
| Years | Club | Games (Goals) |
| 2017– | Essendon | 200 (23) |
- ^{1} Playing statistics correct to the end of 2026.

Career highlights
- Essendon captain: 2026–; Essendon vice-captain: 2023–2025; Ron Evans Medal: 2017; AFLPA best first year player: 2017; 4× 22under22 team: 2017, 2018, 2019, 2020 (c)

Andrew McGrath (born 2 June 1998) is a professional Australian rules footballer and captain of the Essendon Football Club in the Australian Football League (AFL). He was recruited by the Essendon Football Club with the first overall selection in the 2016 national draft.

== Early life ==
McGrath was born in Mississauga, Ontario and moved to Melbourne, Australia at age 5 in 2003, with his family settling in the bayside suburbs. McGrath participated in the Auskick program at Whyte Street in Brighton, Victoria and played junior football with the East Brighton Football Club in the South Metro Junior Football League. He was a talented junior track and field athlete winning the Australian national under-14 high jump competition in 2011, the Victorian state heptathlon and national 200m hurdles events at under-15 level in 2012 and the under-17 400m hurdles in 2014. He was named All-Australian and co-captain of the 2016 AFL Under 18 Championships playing for Vic Metro.

== AFL career ==
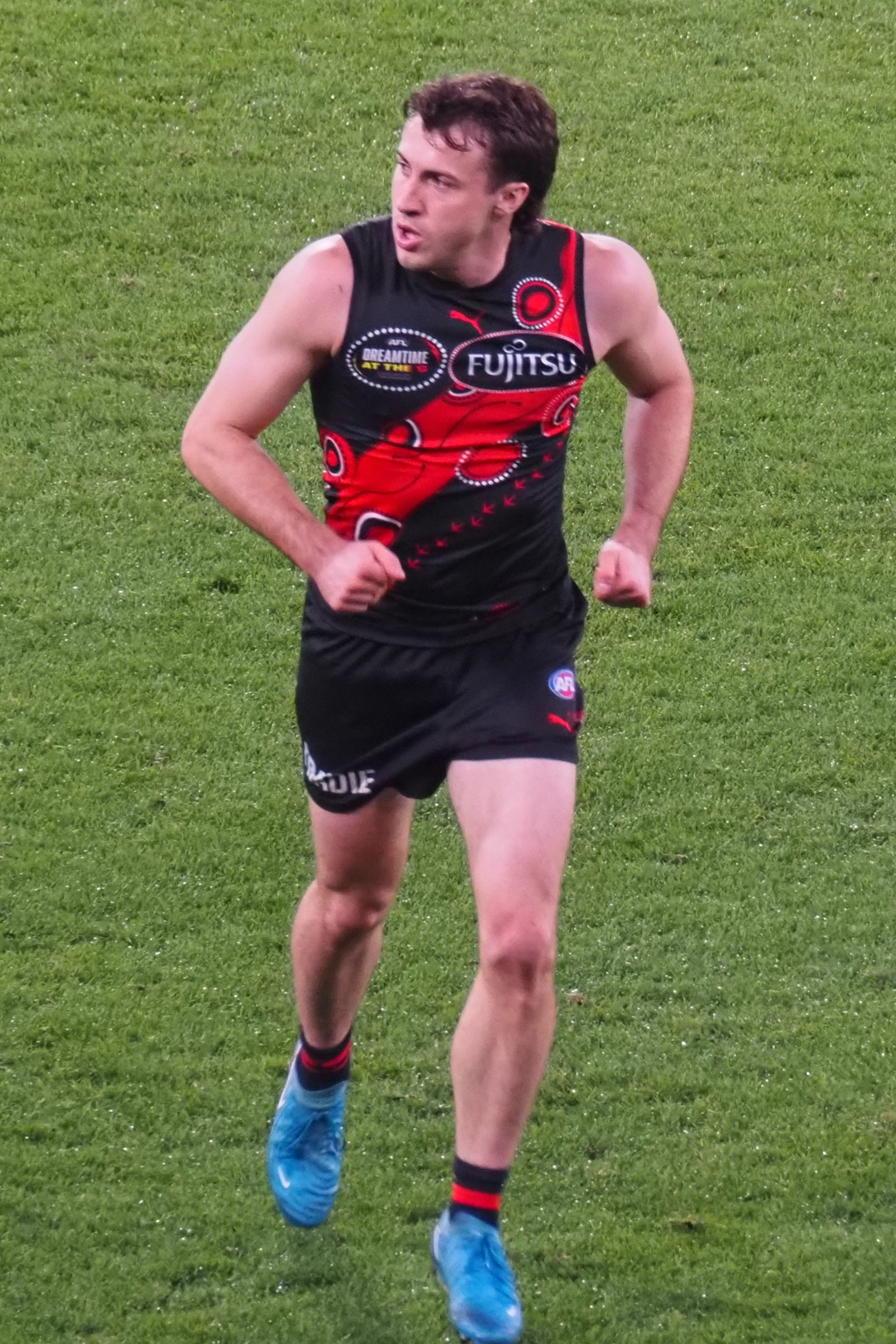
McGrath playing for Essendon in 2025

McGrath was recruited by the Essendon Football Club with the number one draft pick in the 2016 national draft. He made his debut in the 25 point win against Hawthorn in the opening round of the 2017 season at the Melbourne Cricket Ground, recording 22 disposals. He received an AFL Rising Star nomination for his performance in the sixty-five point loss against Adelaide at Adelaide Oval in round four, in which he garnered twenty-eight disposals and four tackles. He kicked his first AFL goal against Melbourne in round 6. McGrath had another notable performance against Adelaide in round 21, where he kept star forward Eddie Betts goalless and held him to only seven disposals, his lowest output of the season. He capped off an outstanding first season by winning the AFL Rising Star, receiving the Ron Evans Medal with 51 votes out of a possible 55, becoming the second Essendon player to win the award, after Dyson Heppell, as well as winning the AFLPA Best First Year Player award, and was named in the 22under22 team.

McGrath was named to the 22under22 team again in 2018 and 2019, and was captain of the 22under22 team in 2020. He moved into Essendon's midfield full-time in 2020, and received the club's Adam Ramanauskas Most Courageous Player award in that year.

On 11 October 2020 the Essendon Football Club announced that McGrath had re-signed until 2022.

For the 2021 season, the Essendon Football Club appointed McGrath a joint vice-captain alongside Michael Hurley and Zach Merrett. He opened the season with 33 disposals, 11 tackles, and a goal in a one-point loss to Hawthorn in Round 1. Early in the first term of the Bombers' round 12 match against Richmond on 5 June 2021, McGrath was substituted out with what proved to be a grade two posterior cruciate ligament injury, which was expected to put him out of action for eight to 12 weeks. He made his return in Essendon's Round 22 match against the Gold Coast Suns, in which he had 13 disposals, three marks, and three tackles.

McGrath played in his hundredth match on 1 May 2022. On 15 July 2022 the Essendon Football Club announced he had signed on to remain with the club through the 2024 season.

McGrath was appointed as Essendon's vice-captain ahead of the 2023 season. McGrath captained the team in the 2023 Anzac Day match, in the absence of suspended captain, Zach Merrett.

In 2024, McGrath signed a six year contract extension with the Bombers to keep him at the club until 2030.

McGrath was one of only four players to play every game for Essendon in the 2025 AFL season.

On 17 December 2025, McGrath was appointed Essendon captain for the 2026 AFL season.

== Statistics ==
Updated to the end of 2026.

Legend
| G | Goals | K | Kicks | D | Disposals | T | Tackles |
| B | Behinds | H | Handballs | M | Marks |

| Season | Team | No. | Games | Totals | | | | | | | Averages (per game) | | | | | | | Votes |
| Season | Team | No. | Games | G | B | K | H | D | M | T | G | B | K | H | D | M | T | Votes |
|---|---|---|---|---|---|---|---|---|---|---|---|---|---|---|---|---|---|---|
| 2017 | Essendon | 1 | 21 | 1 | 1 | 181 | 234 | 415 | 83 | 59 | 0.0 | 0.0 | 8.6 | 11.1 | 19.8 | 4.0 | 2.8 | 0 |
| 2018 | Essendon | 1 | 20 | 5 | 1 | 203 | 195 | 398 | 77 | 48 | 0.3 | 0.1 | 10.2 | 9.8 | 19.9 | 3.9 | 2.4 | 0 |
| 2019 | Essendon | 1 | 23 | 9 | 3 | 248 | 236 | 484 | 79 | 60 | 0.4 | 0.1 | 10.8 | 10.3 | 21.0 | 3.4 | 2.6 | 0 |
| 2020 (Note: The 2020 season was played with 17 home-and-away matches per team (down from 22) and 16-minute quarters with time on (down from 20-minute quarters with time on) due to the impact of the COVID-19 pandemic.) | Essendon | 1 | 14 | 0 | 1 | 149 | 161 | 310 | 22 | 67 | 0.0 | 0.1 | 10.6 | 11.5 | 22.1 | 1.6 | 4.8 | 7 |
| 2021 | Essendon | 1 | 15 | 2 | 4 | 171 | 167 | 338 | 43 | 66 | 0.1 | 0.3 | 11.4 | 11.1 | 22.5 | 2.9 | 4.4 | 2 |
| 2022 | Essendon | 1 | 18 | 2 | 5 | 214 | 171 | 385 | 90 | 47 | 0.1 | 0.3 | 11.9 | 9.5 | 21.4 | 5.0 | 2.6 | 0 |
| 2023 | Essendon | 1 | 23 | 0 | 1 | 289 | 235 | 524 | 120 | 47 | 0.0 | 0.0 | 12.6 | 10.2 | 22.8 | 5.2 | 2.0 | 2 |
| 2024 | Essendon | 1 | 23 | 1 | 0 | 311 | 214 | 525 | 108 | 62 | 0.0 | 0.0 | 13.5 | 9.3 | 22.8 | 4.7 | 2.7 | 2 |
| 2025 | Essendon | 1 | 23 | 1 | 3 | 225 | 298 | 523 | 81 | 56 | 0.0 | 0.1 | 9.8 | 13.0 | 22.7 | 3.5 | 2.4 | 6 |
| 2026 | Essendon | 1 | 20 | 2 | 1 | 194 | 190 | 384 | 77 | 55 | 0.1 | 0.1 | 9.7 | 9.5 | 19.2 | 3.9 | 2.8 | TBA |
| Career | | | 200 | 23 | 20 | 2185 | 2101 | 4286 | 780 | 567 | 0.1 | 0.1 | 10.9 | 10.5 | 21.4 | 3.9 | 2.8 | 19 |
