= Brandan Parfitt =

Australian rules footballer

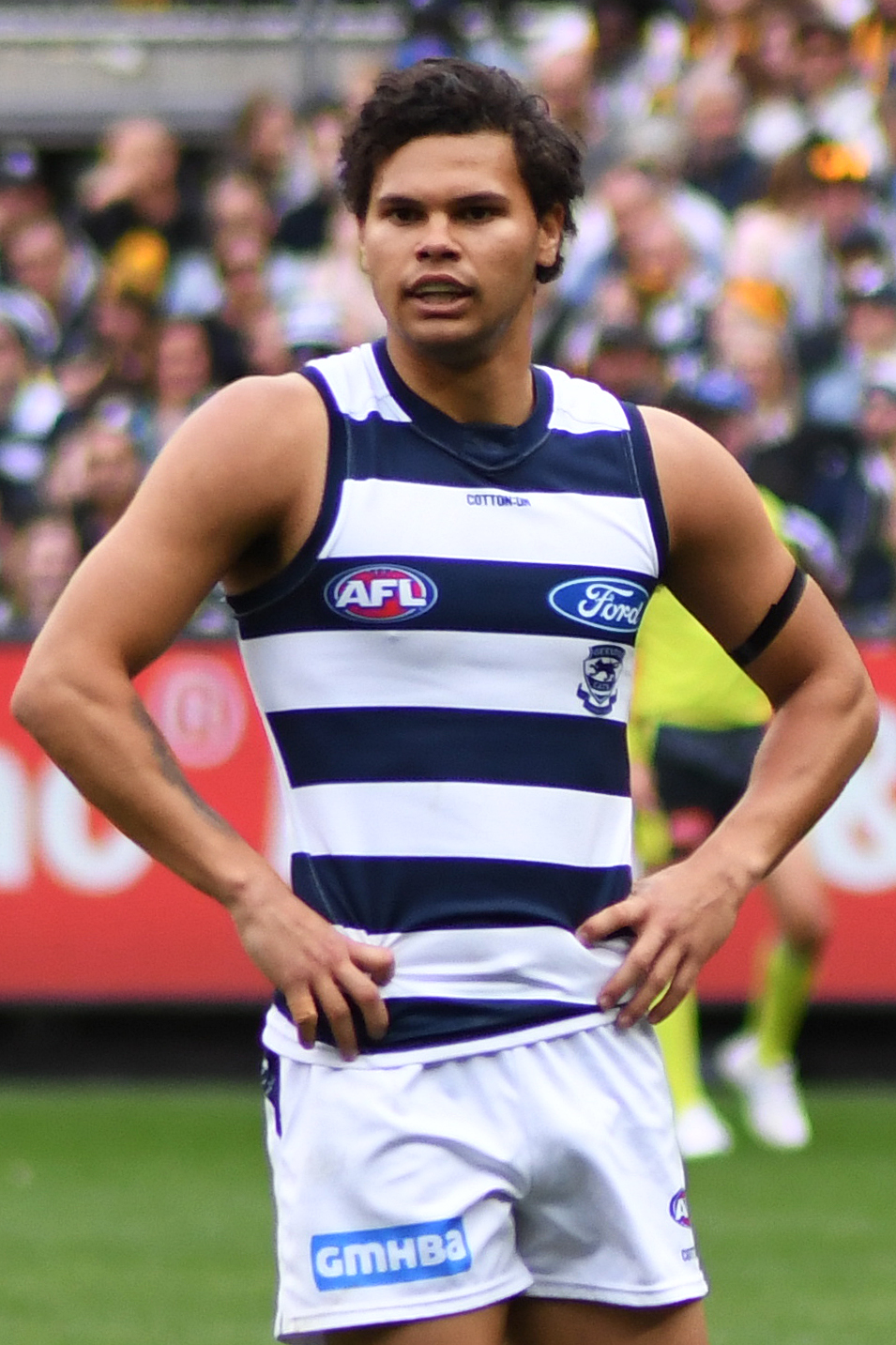
- Parfitt playing for Geelong in April 2019

Personal information
- Born: 27 April 1998 (age 28); Darwin, Northern Territory
- Original team: NT Thunder (NEAFL) / North Adelaide (SANFL)
- Draft: No. 26, 2016 national draft
- Debut: Round 1, 2017, Geelong vs. Fremantle, at Domain Stadium
- Height: 180 cm (5 ft 11 in)
- Weight: 79 kg (174 lb)
- Position: Midfielder

Playing career
Years	Club	Games (Goals)
2017–2024	Geelong	130 (48)

Career highlights
- AFL premiership player: 2022; AFL Rising Star nominee: 2017

Brandan Parfitt (born 27 April 1998) is a former professional Australian rules footballer who played for the Geelong Football Club in the Australian Football League (AFL).

== Early life ==
Parfitt was born and raised in Darwin, Northern Territory and is of indigenous Australian heritage. He is Larrakia and Warumungu. He spent much of his junior football at the Nightcliff Football Club in Darwin.

== AFL career ==
He was drafted by the Geelong Football Club with their first selection and 26th overall in the 2016 national draft. He made his debut in the 42–point win against Fremantle in the opening round of the 2017 season at Domain Stadium. After his third match, he was named the round nominee for the rising star for his performance in the 29–point win against Melbourne at Etihad Stadium in round three, in which he recorded 23 disposals and five tackles.

Parfitt was part of the Geelong team that played in the 2020 AFL Grand Final against Richmond, starting on the interchange bench. It was later revealed that he played out the game with a broken thumb after suffering the injury during the first quarter.

In August 2022, Parfitt signed a new contract keeping him at Geelong until the end of the 2024 season. He would start as the tactical substitute in the 2022 AFL Grand Final in place of injured teammate Max Holmes. Parfitt would come on during the last quarter of the match, kicking a goal almost immediately after replacing Cameron Guthrie.

Parfitt was delisted by Geelong at the end of the 2024 AFL season.

== Statistics ==
Legend
G	Goals	K	Kicks	D	Disposals	T	Tackles
B	Behinds	H	Handballs	M	Marks
#	Played in that season's premiership team

Season	Team	No.	Games	Totals							Averages (per game)							Votes
Season	Team	No.	Games	G	B	K	H	D	M	T	G	B	K	H	D	M	T	Votes
2017	Geelong	3	15	6	4	100	97	197	29	51	0.4	0.3	6.7	6.5	13.1	1.9	3.4	0
2018	Geelong	3	19	15	7	164	178	342	50	85	0.8	0.4	8.6	9.4	18.0	2.6	4.5	3
2019	Geelong	3	20	4	4	190	174	364	39	105	0.2	0.2	9.5	8.7	18.2	2.0	5.3	2
2020 (Note: The 2020 season was played with 17 home-and-away matches per team (down from 22) and 16-minute quarters with time on (down from 20-minute quarters with time on) due to the impact of the COVID-19 pandemic.)	Geelong	3	18	8	6	148	131	279	31	106	0.4	0.3	8.2	7.3	15.5	1.7	5.9	2
2021	Geelong	3	23	8	7	225	207	432	32	128	0.3	0.3	9.8	9.0	18.8	1.4	5.6	6
2022^{#}	Geelong	3	17	5	4	168	180	348	32	80	0.3	0.2	9.9	10.6	20.5	1.9	4.7	0
2023	Geelong	3	9	1	1	58	56	114	6	50	0.1	0.1	6.4	6.2	12.7	0.7	5.6	0
2024	Geelong	3	9	1	2	77	76	153	13	57	0.1	0.2	8.6	8.4	17.0	1.4	6.3	0
Career			130	48	35	1130	1099	2229	232	662	0.4	0.3	8.7	8.5	17.1	1.8	5.1	13

== Honours and achievements ==
Team

- AFL premiership player (Geelong): 2022
- 2× McClelland Trophy (Geelong): 2019, 2022

Individual

- AFL Rising Star nominee: 2017 (round 3)
