= Lewis Melican =

Australian rules footballer

Personal information
- Full name: Lewis Melican
- Nickname: The Pelican
- Born: 4 November 1996 (age 29); Birregurra, Victoria
- Original team: Geelong Falcons (TAC Cup)
- Draft: No. 52, 2015 rookie draft
- Debut: Round 5, 2017, Sydney vs. Greater Western Sydney, at SCG
- Height: 193 cm (6 ft 4 in)
- Weight: 95 kg (209 lb)
- Position: Defender

Club information
- Current club: Sydney
- Number: 43

Playing career^{1}
Years	Club	Games (Goals)
2015–	Sydney	111 (2)
- ^{1} Playing statistics correct to the end of round 22, 2026.

Lewis Melican (born 4 November 1996) is a professional Australian rules footballer playing for the Sydney Swans in the Australian Football League (AFL). He was drafted by Sydney with their third selection and fifty-second overall in the 2015 rookie draft. He made his debut in the forty-two point loss against Greater Western Sydney at the Sydney Cricket Ground in round five of the 2017 season.

Melican received the AFL Rising Star nomination for round 18 after restricting St Kilda key forward Nick Riewoldt to ten disposals and one goal in the Swans' forty-two point win at the Sydney Cricket Ground. After not playing at all in the 2022 season, Melican returned to the swans senior side in round 13 2023. He has started consistently in the 2024 season.

== Statistics ==
Updated to the end of round 22, 2026.

Legend
G	Goals	K	Kicks	D	Disposals	T	Tackles
B	Behinds	H	Handballs	M	Marks

Season	Team	No.	Games	Totals							Averages (per game)							Votes
Season	Team	No.	Games	G	B	K	H	D	M	T	G	B	K	H	D	M	T	Votes
2015	Sydney	43	0	—	—	—	—	—	—	—	—	—	—	—	—	—	—	0
2016	Sydney	43	0	—	—	—	—	—	—	—	—	—	—	—	—	—	—	0
2017	Sydney	43	17	1	1	112	91	203	62	31	0.1	0.1	6.6	5.4	11.9	3.6	1.8	0
2018	Sydney	43	3	0	0	26	14	40	9	5	0.0	0.0	8.7	4.7	13.3	3.0	1.7	0
2019	Sydney	43	17	0	0	109	66	175	56	36	0.0	0.0	6.4	3.9	10.3	3.3	2.1	0
2020 (Note: The 2020 season was played with 17 home-and-away matches per team (down from 22) and 16-minute quarters with time on (down from 20-minute quarters with time on) due to the impact of the COVID-19 pandemic.)	Sydney	43	9	0	0	53	37	90	21	14	0.0	0.0	5.9	4.1	10.0	2.3	1.6	0
2021	Sydney	43	6	0	0	53	23	76	30	5	0.0	0.0	8.8	3.8	12.7	5.0	0.8	0
2022	Sydney	43	0	—	—	—	—	—	—	—	—	—	—	—	—	—	—	0
2023	Sydney	43	8	0	0	47	33	80	19	19	0.0	0.0	5.9	4.1	10.0	2.4	2.4	0
2024	Sydney	43	24	1	0	143	61	204	78	35	0.0	0.0	6.0	2.5	8.5	3.3	1.5	0
2025	Sydney	43	17	0	0	117	48	165	75	34	0.0	0.0	6.9	2.8	9.7	4.4	2.0	0
2026	Sydney	43	10	0	1	64	50	114	38	14	0.0	0.1	6.4	5.0	11.4	3.8	1.4	0
Career			111	2	2	724	423	1147	388	193	0.0	0.0	6.5	3.8	10.3	3.5	1.7	0

== Honours and achievements ==
Individual

- AFL Rising Star nominee: 2017 (round 18)
