= Jake Barrett (footballer) =

Australian rules footballer (born 1995)

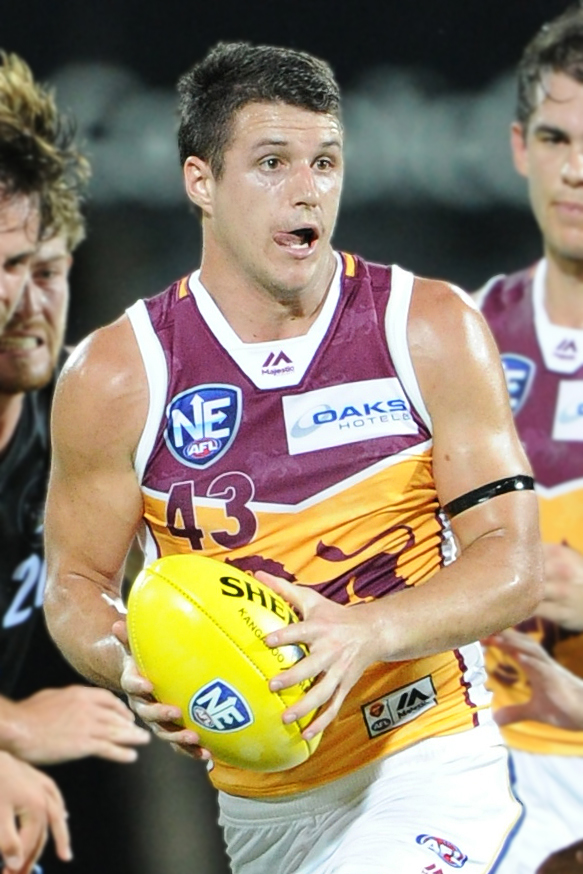
- Barrett in April 2018

Personal information
- Full name: Jake Barrett
- Born: 8 November 1995 (age 30)
- Original teams: Temora, NSW/ACT Rams
- Draft: No. 97, 2013 national draft, Greater Western Sydney; No. 2, 2017 rookie draft, Brisbane Lions
- Height: 184 cm (6 ft 0 in)
- Weight: 83 kg (183 lb)
- Position: Midfield / forward

Playing career^{1}
Years	Club	Games (Goals)
2014–2016	Greater Western Sydney	1 (0)
2017–2018	Brisbane Lions	22 (19)
Total		23 (19)
- ^{1} Playing statistics correct to the end of 2018.

Jake Barrett (born 8 November 1995) is a former professional Australian rules footballer who played for the Greater Western Sydney Giants and the Brisbane Lions in the Australian Football League (AFL).

Barrett, originally from Temora, is the first cousin of Hawthorn premiership player Luke Breust and the second cousin of former Dally M winning rugby league player Trent Barrett. He was picked up as a NSW zone selection by the GWS Giants on the back of a strong AFL Under 18 Championships and excellent results at the 2013 AFL draft combine where he finished second in the beep test reaching level 15.6 as well as a top 10 result in the 20-metre sprint. At the conclusion of the 2016 season, he was delisted by Greater Western Sydney. He was subsequently drafted by the Brisbane Lions in the 2017 rookie draft. However he was subsequently delisted by them as well the following season.
