= Ben Ainsworth =

Australian rules footballer

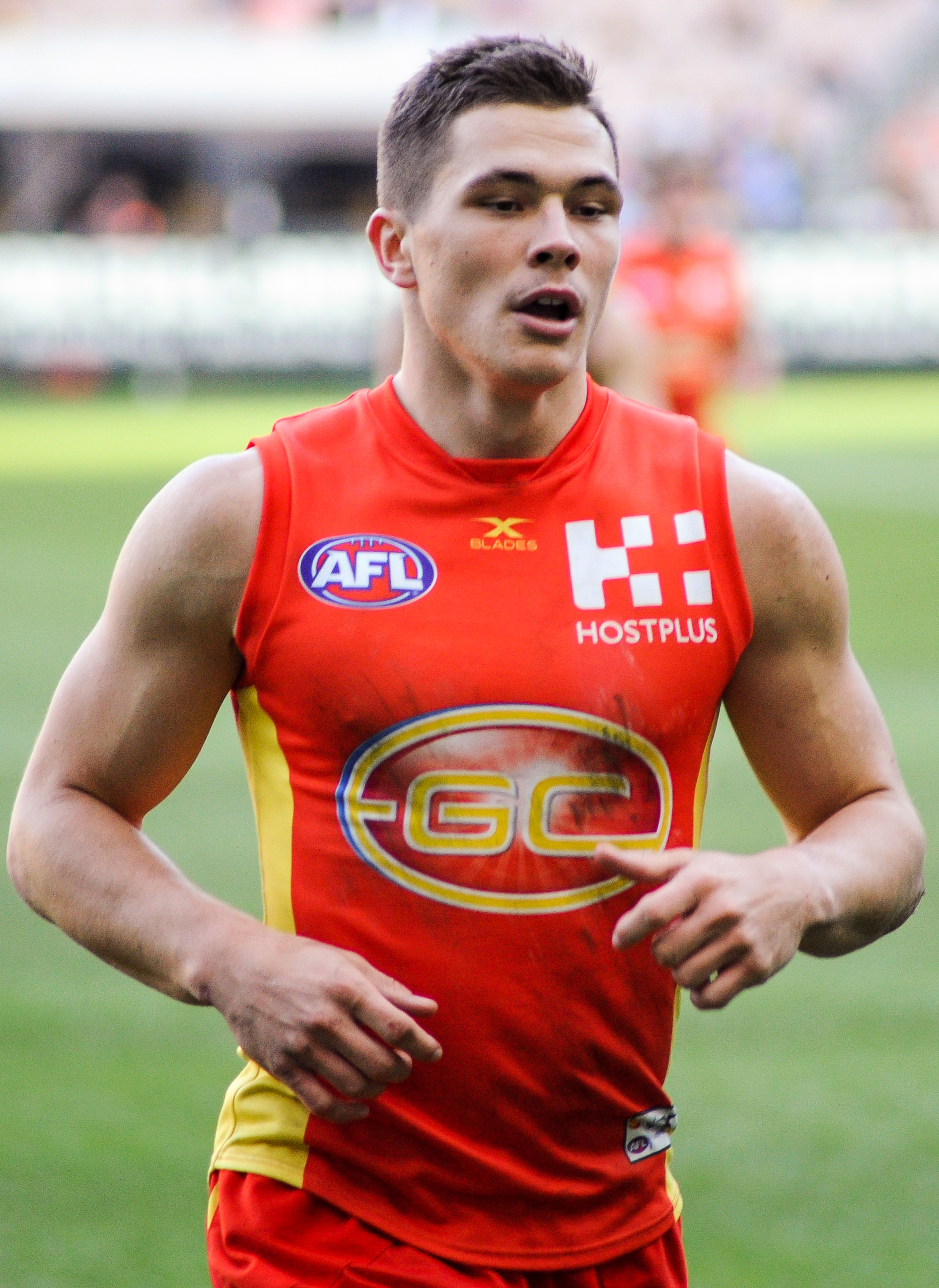
- Ainsworth playing for Gold Coast in June 2017

Personal information
- Full name: Ben Ainsworth
- Nickname: Banger
- Born: 10 February 1998 (age 28); Morwell, Victoria, Australia
- Original team: Gippsland Power (TAC Cup)
- Draft: No. 4, 2016 national draft
- Height: 179 cm (5 ft 10 in)
- Weight: 77 kg (170 lb)
- Position: Forward

Club information
- Current club: Carlton
- Number: 12

Playing career^{1}
Years	Club	Games (Goals)
2017–2025	Gold Coast	158 (137)
2026–	Carlton	25 (30)
Total		183 (167)
- ^{1} Playing statistics correct to the end of the 2026 season.

Career highlights
- AFL Rising Star nominee: 2017

Ben Ainsworth (born 10 February 1998) is an Australian rules footballer playing for the Carlton Football Club in the Australian Football League (AFL). He was drafted by the Gold Coast Football Club with their first selection and fourth overall in the 2016 national draft. He made his debut in the two point loss against the Brisbane Lions in the opening round of the 2017 season at Metricon Stadium.

Ainsworth received the AFL Rising Star nomination for round 22 after kicking three goals from ten disposals in the Suns' 32-point loss to Essendon at Metricon Stadium. He was traded to Carlton following the 2025 AFL season.

== Statistics ==
Updated to the end of the 2026 season.

Legend
G	Goals	K	Kicks	D	Disposals	T	Tackles
B	Behinds	H	Handballs	M	Marks

Season	Team	No.	Games	Totals							Averages (per game)							Votes
Season	Team	No.	Games	G	B	K	H	D	M	T	G	B	K	H	D	M	T	Votes
2017	Gold Coast	27	13	14	9	89	64	153	45	42	1.1	0.7	6.8	4.9	11.8	3.5	3.2	0
2018	Gold Coast	9	16	6	12	131	106	237	45	52	0.4	0.8	8.2	6.6	14.8	2.8	3.3	0
2019	Gold Coast	9	12	8	6	110	90	200	49	19	0.7	0.5	9.2	7.5	16.7	4.1	1.6	0
2020 (Note: The 2020 season was played with 17 home-and-away matches per team (down from 22) and 16-minute quarters with time on (down from 20-minute quarters with time on) due to the impact of the COVID-19 pandemic.)	Gold Coast	9	16	12	13	147	80	227	70	27	0.8	0.8	9.2	5.0	14.2	4.4	1.7	2
2021	Gold Coast	9	17	12	18	187	74	261	90	35	0.7	1.1	11.0	4.4	15.4	5.3	2.1	0
2022	Gold Coast	9	22	25	19	235	118	353	127	57	1.1	0.9	10.7	5.4	16.0	5.8	2.6	1
2023	Gold Coast	9	21	21	15	228	143	371	100	39	1.0	0.7	10.9	6.8	17.7	4.8	1.9	0
2024	Gold Coast	9	17	16	9	173	92	265	83	19	0.9	0.5	10.2	5.4	15.6	4.9	1.1	0
2025	Gold Coast	9	24	23	14	175	147	322	85	39	1.0	0.6	7.3	6.1	13.4	3.5	1.6	0
2026	Carlton	12	25	30	20	255	188	443	136	35	1.2	0.8	10.2	7.5	17.7	5.4	1.4	2
Career			183	167	135	1730	1102	2832	830	364	0.9	0.7	9.5	6.0	15.5	4.5	2.0	5
