= Sam Petrevski-Seton =

Australian rules footballer

Samo Petrevski-Seton
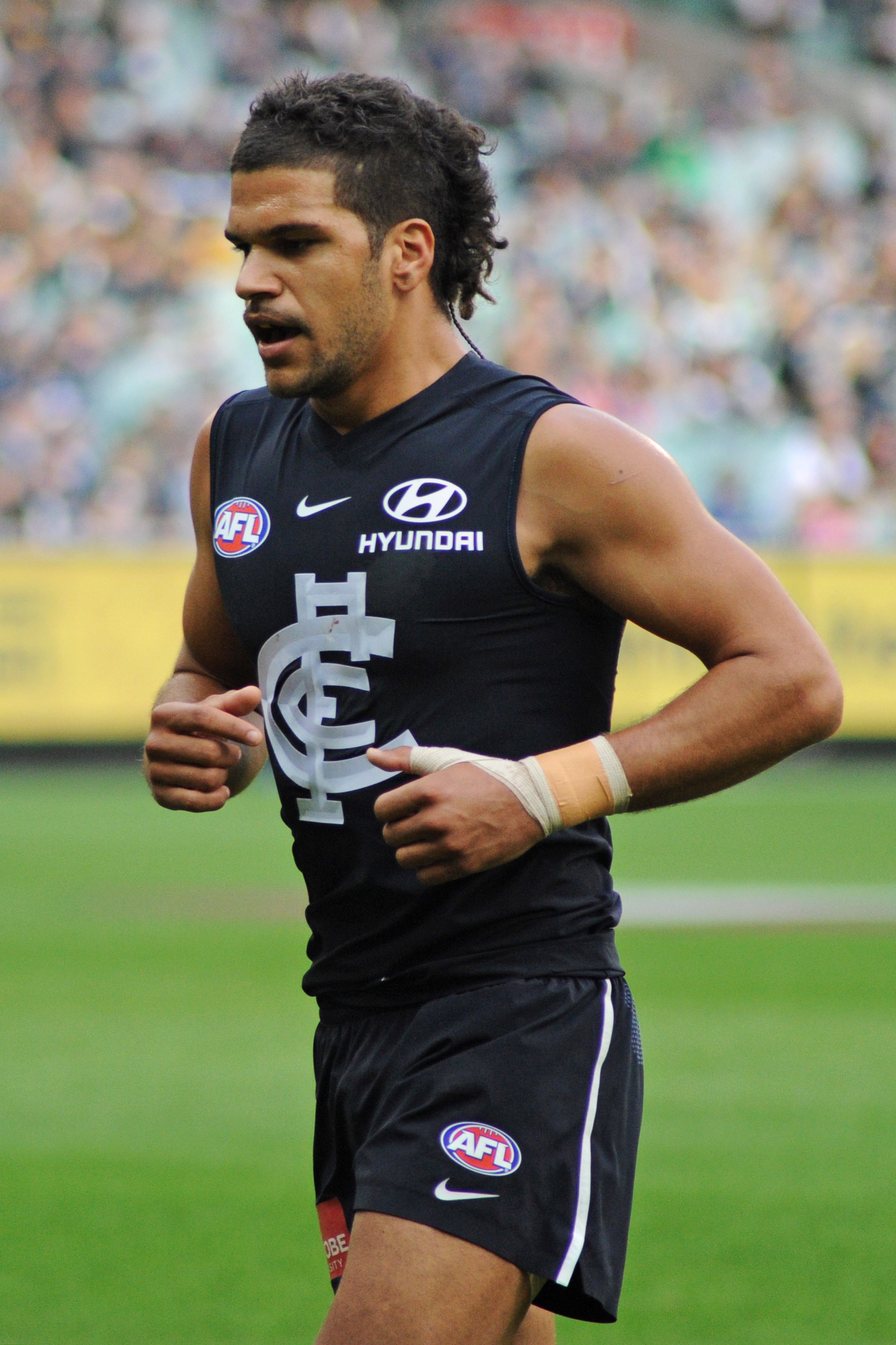
- Petrevski-Seton playing for Carlton in April 2018

Personal information
- Full name: Sam Petrevski-Seton
- Nicknames: Samo, SPS
- Born: 19 February 1998 (age 28)
- Original team: Claremont (WAFL)
- Draft: No. 6, 2016 national draft
- Debut: Round 1, 2017, Carlton vs. Richmond, at Melbourne Cricket Ground
- Height: 182 cm (6 ft 0 in)
- Weight: 80 kg (176 lb)
- Position: Utility

Playing career^{1}
Years	Club	Games (Goals)
2017–2021	Carlton	94 (20)
2022–2023	West Coast	27 (4)
Total		121 (24)
- ^{1} Playing statistics correct to the end of 2023.

Career highlights
- AFL Rising Star nominee: 2017

Samo Petrevski-Seton (born 19 February 1998) is a former professional Australian rules footballer who played for the Carlton Football Club and West Coast Eagles in the Australian Football League (AFL). He was drafted by Carlton with the sixth pick in the 2016 national draft, and made his debut for the club in round one of the 2017 season.

== Early life and career ==
Petrevski-Seton spent his first years on a cattle station near Fitzroy Crossing, Western Australia, where his father was working as a stockman. The family moved to Halls Creek when he was three. Petrevski-Seton is Indigenous Australian, and also has Macedonian ancestry on his mother's side – his maternal grandfather immigrated from Macedonia. He grew up speaking Kriol as his first language, and did not learn standard English until moving to Perth to board at Clontarf Aboriginal College, which he attended from 2013 to 2015. Outside of playing football, Petrevski-Seton enjoyed competitive bull riding, which he took up at the age of 12.

== Football career ==
=== Junior career ===
Petrevski-Seton grew up playing for Halls Creek teams in the junior divisions of the East Kimberley Football Association. After moving to Perth for school, he began training with the Claremont Football Club, whose recruiting zone takes in the Kimberley region. Petrevski-Seton spent four seasons of WAFL colts (under-18) competition, making his debut at the age of 15. He made his senior debut for Claremont at the age of 17, playing three games early in the 2015 season. Petrevski-Seton also represented Western Australia at under-16 and under-18 level. He was named in the All-Australian team at the 2015 AFL Under 18 Championships.

=== AFL career ===
Petrevski-Seton was drafted by Carlton with their first pick (sixth overall) in the 2016 national draft. He made his debut in the opening round of the 2017 season, playing in Carlton's 43-point loss to Richmond at the Melbourne Cricket Ground. After his team's 23-point win against Collingwood at the MCG in round seven, in which he recorded 21 disposals, four marks, three tackles and two goals, he was nominated for the 2017 AFL Rising Star.

In his second season, Petreveski-Seton played all 22 games in 2018. He averaged 16.1 disposals, and kicked 5 goals for the year. He also averaged 4.3 tackles per match.

In 2019, Petreveski-Seton had a break out game against the Western Bulldogs in round 5. Amassing 35 disposals, 9 more than his previous best, as well as kicking an important steadying goal in the 3rd quarter, he was considered by many experts to be best on ground in Carlton's first win of the 2019 season.

At the conclusion of the 2021 AFL season, Petrevski-Seton sought to return to his home state of Western Australia, and requested a trade to West Coast. He was traded on 7 October.

Following the end of the 2023 season Petrevski-Seton was delisted by the West Coast Eagles.

== Statistics ==
Statistics are correct to the end of the 2023 season

Legend
G	Goals	K	Kicks	D	Disposals	T	Tackles
B	Behinds	H	Handballs	M	Marks

Season	Team	No.	Games	Totals							Averages (per game)							Votes
Season	Team	No.	Games	G	B	K	H	D	M	T	G	B	K	H	D	M	T	Votes
2017	Carlton	5	20	10	7	168	112	280	65	95	0.5	0.4	8.4	5.6	14.0	3.3	4.8	3
2018	Carlton	5	22	5	8	206	148	354	79	95	0.2	0.4	9.4	6.7	16.1	3.6	4.3	1
2019	Carlton	5	22	4	4	245	175	420	87	96	0.2	0.2	11.1	8.0	19.1	4.0	4.4	2
2020	Carlton	5	16	0	0	155	62	217	49	36	0.0	0.0	9.7	3.9	13.6	3.1	2.3	0
2021	Carlton	5	14	1	3	134	64	198	56	26	0.1	0.2	9.6	4.6	14.2	4.0	1.9	0
2022	West Coast	10	14	1	1	89	75	164	42	43	0.1	0.1	6.4	5.4	11.7	3.0	3.1	0
2023	West Coast	10	13	3	3	94	83	177	35	43	0.2	0.2	7.2	6.4	13.6	2.7	3.3	0
Career			121	24	26	1091	719	1810	413	434	0.2	0.2	9.0	5.9	14.9	3.4	3.9	6
