= Jack Silvagni =

Australian rules footballer (born 1997)

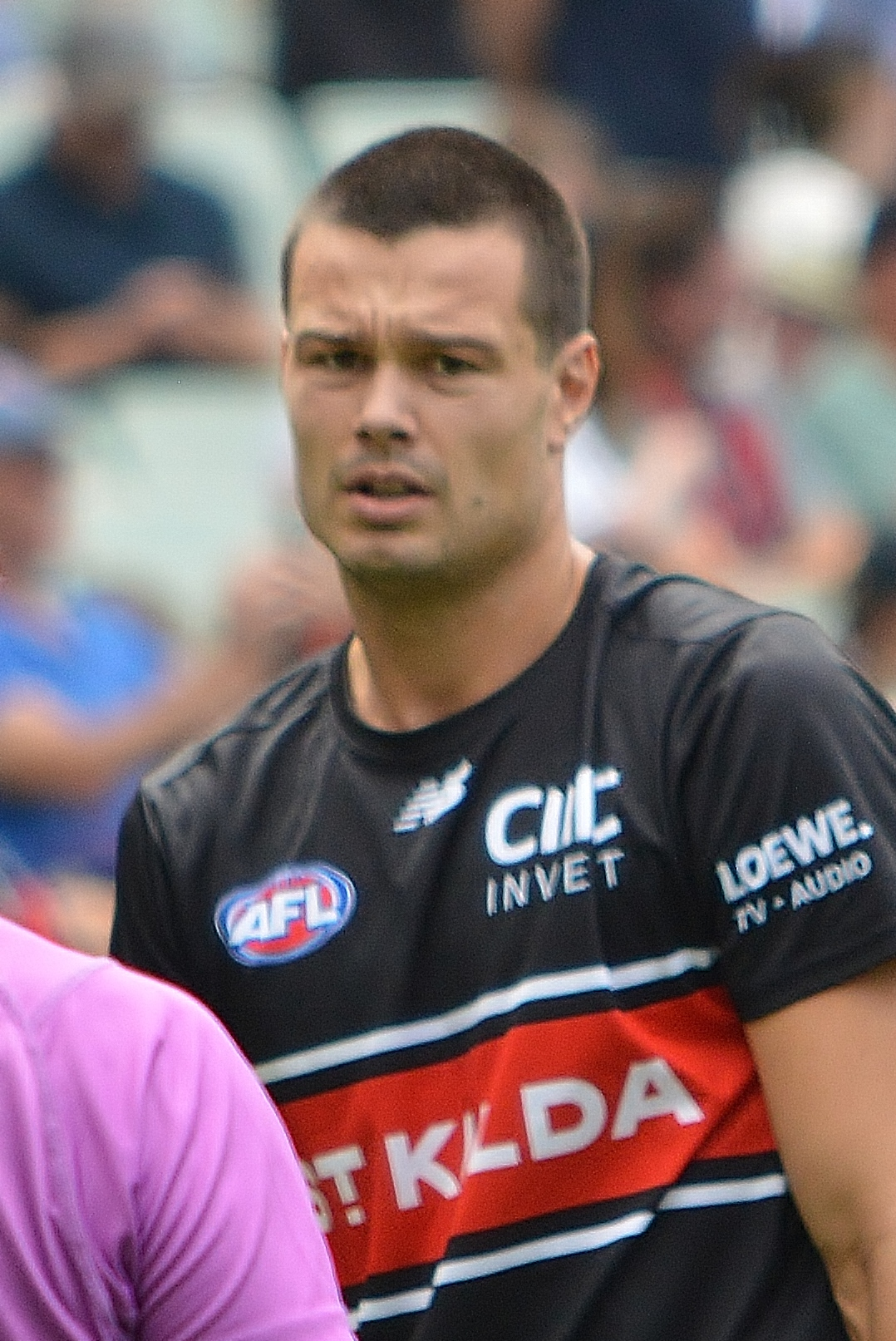
- Silvagni playing for St Kilda in 2026

Personal information
- Born: 17 December 1997 (age 28); Melbourne, Victoria, Australia
- Original team: Oakleigh Chargers (TAC Cup)
- Draft: No. 53 (F/S), 2015 national draft
- Height: 194 cm (6 ft 4 in)
- Weight: 92 kg (203 lb)
- Position: Key defender

Club information
- Current club: St Kilda
- Number: 3

Playing career^{1}
Years	Club	Games (Goals)
2016–2025	Carlton	128 (89)
2026–	St Kilda	21 (5)
Total		147 (94)
- ^{1} Playing statistics correct to the end of round 22, 2026.

Career highlights
- AFL Rising Star nominee: 2017

Jack Silvagni (born 17 December 1997) is an Australian rules footballer currently playing for St Kilda in the Australian Football League (AFL)

He was a third-generation Carlton footballer; both his father, Stephen, and paternal grandfather, Sergio, played for Carlton and are legends in the club's Hall of Fame. He is also a second cousin once removed of former Carlton teammate Alex Silvagni and the brother of former teammate Ben Silvagni.

== Early life and junior career ==
Silvagni grew up in the Melbourne suburb of Balwyn North and attended Xavier College. He played junior football for his school, the Greythorn Falcons, the Doncaster Cats in the Yarra Junior Football League, the Oakleigh Chargers in the TAC Cup, and Victoria Metro at the AFL Under-18 Championships. His mother is Australian television presenter and model Jo Silvagni, and he has two younger brothers, Ben and Tom.

== AFL playing career ==
=== Carlton (2016–2025) ===
Silvagni was drafted with the 53rd selection in the 2015 AFL draft under the father–son rule when Carlton matched Essendon's bid for him. He was given the No. 2 guernsey for the 2016 season; then, after the retirement of its incumbent Andrew Walker at the end of 2016, switched to the No. 1 guernsey which father Stephen and grandfather Sergio had both famously worn.

In the 2017 season, Silvagni received the AFL Rising Star nomination for round 13 following his performance against the Gold Coast Suns in which he kicked two crucial last-quarter goals, helping his side to a ten-point win. After spending more time as a midfielder in the 2018 season, Silvagni was amassing more handballs and tackles as opposed to goals. Some pundits believed he wasn't living up to expectations, though; however, a lot of people, including the coach, had faith in him.

Jack moved back to his drafted position as a third tall forward during the 2019 AFL Season, where he was occasionally used as a utility player, providing an option further afield rather than an inside-50 marking target. Jack enjoyed career-high disposal numbers in 2019, averaging 13.8 per game. The year 2020 was a highly interrupted one for Jack, sustaining a bruised lung and fractured rib during a win against Essendon Football Club, for which Essendon midfielder Zach Merrett received a one-match ban after the Match Review Officer reviewed the game and charged Merrett with striking. Compounding his injury woes, Jack went under the knife in August to have a small ITB (Iliotibial band) release procedure. These injuries would mean that Jack only took the field for a total of three games for the 2020 season.

Silvagni returned to the field regularly during Carlton's 2021 season. He continued to play as a third tall forward while also rotating through the midfield as a back-up ruckman whenever Carlton went into games with only one recognised ruckman; although he was generally quite undersized compared with his ruck opponents, he was often effective at nullifying tap-outs and winning the ball at ground level.

Silvagni played a career-high 21 games during Carlton's 2022 season. He averaged 14.19 disposal per game, a career record to this point.

Silvagni ruptured his anterior cruciate ligament (ACL) in a training injury on 25 January 2024, and missed the 2024 season.

Prior to the 2025 AFL season, Silvagni was training with the backline squad, with teammate Brodie Kemp switching to Silvagni’s former role up forward.

Silvangi played for Carlton from 2016 until 2025 for a total of 128 games and kicked 89 goals.

=== St Kilda (2026-present) ===
At the conclusion of the 2025 season, Silvagni informed Carlton of his desire to leave as an unrestricted free agent. Silvagni had met with other Victorian clubs, such as Collingwood, Essendon, St Kilda and the Western Bulldogs. Ultimately, Silvagni declared his intention to play for St Kilda in 2026 and beyond. On the first day of the free agency period Silvagni's move to St Kilda was confirmed.

== Personal life ==
Silvagni is currently studying a Bachelor of Property and Real Estate/Bachelor of Commerce at Deakin University.

== Statistics ==
Updated to the end of round 22, 2026.

Legend
G	Goals	K	Kicks	D	Disposals	T	Tackles
B	Behinds	H	Handballs	M	Marks

Season	Team	No.	Games	Totals							Averages (per game)							Votes
Season	Team	No.	Games	G	B	K	H	D	M	T	G	B	K	H	D	M	T	Votes
2016	Carlton	2	8	7	7	53	23	76	26	25	0.9	0.9	6.6	2.9	9.5	3.3	3.1	0
2017	Carlton	1	20	19	17	144	57	201	90	51	1.0	0.9	7.2	2.9	10.1	4.5	2.6	0
2018	Carlton	1	15	6	4	93	68	161	45	42	0.4	0.3	6.2	4.5	10.7	3.0	2.8	0
2019	Carlton	1	17	13	11	146	89	235	73	62	0.8	0.6	8.6	5.2	13.8	4.3	3.6	0
2020 (Note: The 2020 season was played with 17 home-and-away matches per team (down from 22) and 16-minute quarters with time on (down from 20-minute quarters with time on) due to the impact of the COVID-19 pandemic.)	Carlton	1	3	2	2	12	4	16	5	2	0.7	0.7	4.0	1.3	5.3	1.7	0.7	0
2021	Carlton	1	15	9	13	130	70	200	70	38	0.6	0.9	8.7	4.7	13.3	4.7	2.5	0
2022	Carlton	1	21	17	14	185	113	298	102	64	0.8	0.7	8.8	5.4	14.2	4.9	3.0	0
2023	Carlton	1	16	14	12	129	88	217	64	43	0.9	0.8	8.1	5.5	13.6	4.0	2.7	2
2024	Carlton	1	0	—	—	—	—	—	—	—	—	—	—	—	—	—	—	0
2025	Carlton	1	13	2	4	139	40	179	76	30	0.2	0.3	10.7	3.1	13.8	5.8	2.3	0
2026	St Kilda	3	21	5	3	196	105	301	129	44	0.2	0.1	9.3	5.0	14.3	6.1	2.1	0
Career			149	94	87	1227	657	1884	680	401	0.6	0.6	8.2	4.4	12.6	4.6	2.7	2
