= Josh Prudden =

Australian rules footballer (born 1994)

Personal information
- Born: 6 September 1994 (age 32)
- Original team: Assumption College
- Draft: No. 50, 2012 national draft No. 35, 2017 rookie draft
- Height: 182 cm (6 ft 0 in)
- Weight: 83 kg (183 lb)

Playing career^{1}
| Years | Club | Games (Goals) |
| 2013–2017 | Western Bulldogs | 4 (0) |
- ^{1} Playing statistics correct to the end of 2017.

Josh Prudden (born 6 September 1994) is a former professional Australian rules footballer who played for the Western Bulldogs in the Australian Football League (AFL) and captained Footscray Bulldogs in the Victorian Football League (VFL) for three seasons.

Before his AFL career, Prudden played as a midfielder for Assumption College under coach Scott Wynd, a former player for Western Bulldogs, who helped him to be drafted by the Bulldogs. Injuries kept him from playing consistently in the Bulldogs' reserves teams early in his career, but in 2015 he was eventually rewarded for good form in the Victorian Football League with his AFL debut. He was cut short in early 2016 when he suffered a major knee injury and he never returned to the AFL side, being demoted to the Bulldogs' rookie list at the end of 2016 and delisted altogether at the end of 2017.

== Early life ==
Prudden started his football career playing for Assumption College as their captain under coach Scott Wynd, who had previously played AFL for Western Bulldogs. Wynd help draw the attention of Bulldogs recruiters to Prudden and moved him from his normal position in the midfield to Assumption College's forward line to display his strong marking ability. During 2012 he also played for TAC Cup side Murray Bushrangers and for country club Seymour in the Goulburn Valley Football League, where he played in a grand final in front of Bulldogs recruiters. This helped him to get drafted unexpectedly by the Bulldogs with pick 50 in the 2012 national draft.

== AFL career ==
=== Early injury troubles (2013–2014) ===
Prudden started his career playing for the Bulldogs' VFL affiliate Williamstown, but ankle injuries meant he was unavailable to play for all but 9 matches. Due to the deteriorating relationship between the Western Bulldogs and Williamstown, an agreement was made that no more than twelve Bulldogs players could play in the VFL side in any given week, so Prudden was forced to play seven of his nine matches for Williamstown's own reserves team in the VFL reserves. He played his best game in the VFL against Collingwood's reserves team where he accumulated 23 possessions. His good form saw him sign a contract extension, keeping him at the Western Bulldogs at least until the end of the 2015 season.

In 2014 the Western Bulldogs introduced their own reserves team into the VFL, Footscray, and Prudden played for them in their first match. He was injured in the match and wasn't able to return to the side until round 11. A knee injury sidelined him again at the end of the season, meaning he could only play six VFL matches, but he recovered from this injury in time to commence training at the beginning of the 2015 pre-season.

=== Debut and delisting (2015–2017) ===
In 2015 the Western Bulldogs got a new senior coach, Luke Beveridge. Beveridge wanted to put an emphasis on rewarding good form in the VFL, so when Prudden played consistently in the first half of the season he was given his AFL debut against Gold Coast in round 15 as a half-back. After playing four AFL games, he injured his hamstring and wasn't able to return to the team. He impressed enough in his four AFL games that he was given a one-year contract extension.

In 2016 Prudden injured his anterior cruciate ligament in a VFL match against Richmond. This injury ruled him out of playing any football for the rest of the season, but the Western Bulldogs committed to moving him to their rookie list for the 2017 season. Prudden was delisted from the Bulldogs' senior list at the end of 2016 and he was subsequently re-drafted with selection 35 in the 2017 rookie draft. He made his return from injury in a VFL practice match against Essendon concurrently to round 1 of the 2017 AFL season. In May he faced injury once again, this time in his hamstring, and at the end of the season he was delisted.

== Player profile ==
Before his AFL career, Prudden showed great potential as an inside midfielder thanks to his strength over the ball, but also had versatility, able to take a strong mark and play as a forward. At the Western Bulldogs, he was known for his impressive attack on the ball and selfless team play, being described as "the very definition of a great teammate" by list manager Jason McCartney. His versatility came in handy when he had to make his AFL debut playing across half-back as opposed to the midfield role he was more used to.

== Statistics ==
Statistics are correct to the end of the 2017 season

Legend
| G | Goals | K | Kicks | D | Disposals | T | Tackles |
| B | Behinds | H | Handballs | M | Marks |

| Season | Team | No. | Games | Totals | | | | | | | Averages (per game) | | | | | | |
| Season | Team | No. | Games | G | B | K | H | D | M | T | G | B | K | H | D | M | T |
|---|---|---|---|---|---|---|---|---|---|---|---|---|---|---|---|---|---|
| 2015 | Western Bulldogs | 28 | 4 | 0 | 0 | 26 | 24 | 50 | 16 | 8 | 0.0 | 0.0 | 6.5 | 6.0 | 12.5 | 4.0 | 2.0 |
| Career | | | 4 | 0 | 0 | 26 | 24 | 50 | 16 | 8 | 0.0 | 0.0 | 6.5 | 6.0 | 12.5 | 4.0 | 2.0 |
