= 2017 AFL Rising Star =

Australian rules football award

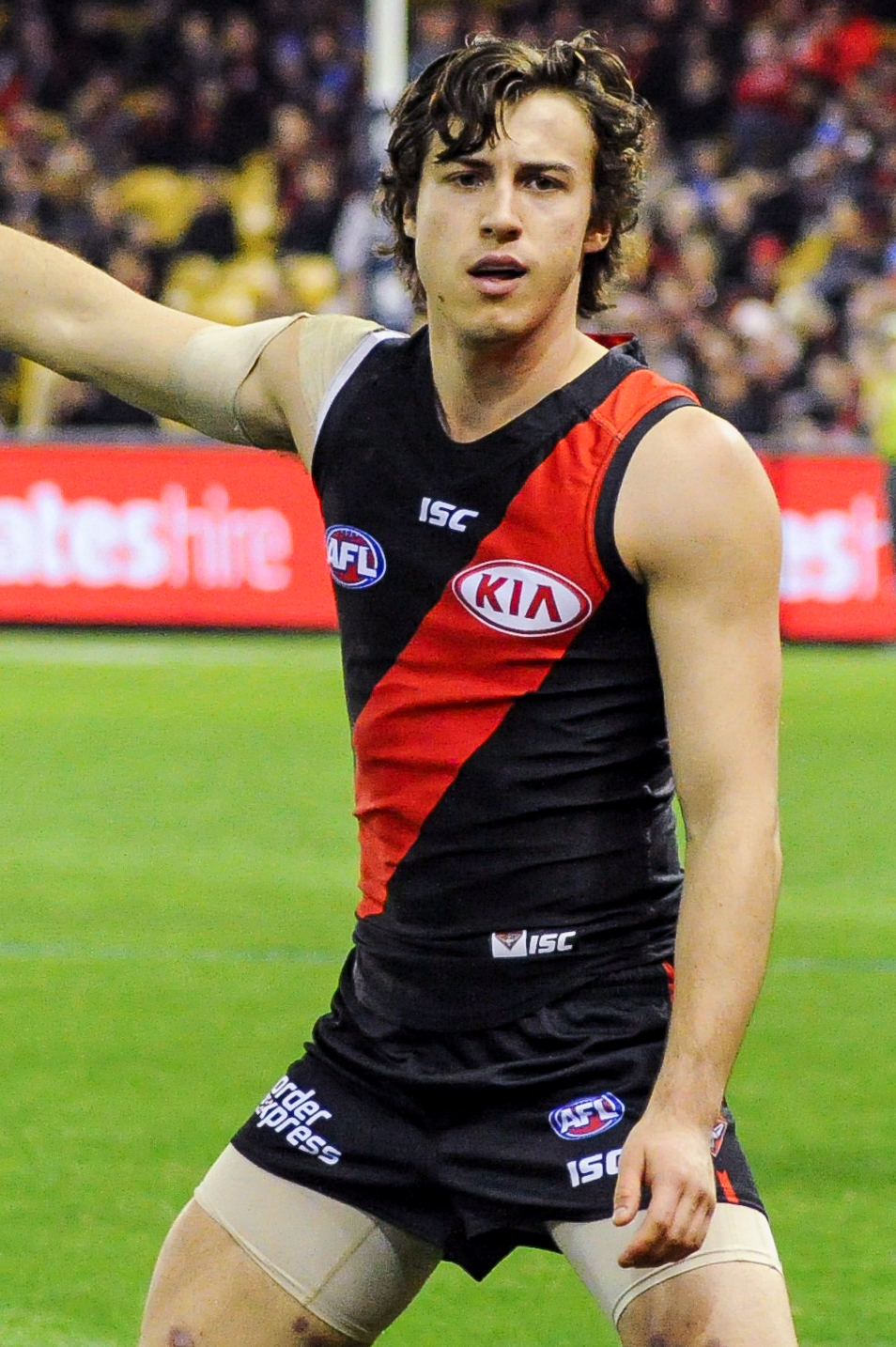
- Andrew McGrath, 2017 winner
- Sponsored by: National Australia Bank
- Date: 1 September 2017
- Country: Australia
- Ron Evans medallist: Andrew McGrath (Essendon)

Television/radio coverage
- Network: Fox Footy

The AFL Rising Star is an Australian rules football award presented annually to the player adjudged the best young player in the Australian Football League (AFL) for the year. An eligible player is nominated for the award each round during the AFL's regular season, and a panel of experts votes for the winner at the end of the season.

During the 2017 season, the award was sponsored by National Australia Bank, and the winner announced in a presentation held on 1 September 2017 and broadcast on subscription television by Fox Footy. The voting panel for this season consisted of eleven members, all of whom were AFL officials or former players: Kevin Bartlett, Luke Darcy, Andrew Dillon, Danny Frawley, Glen Jakovich, Chris Johnson, Cameron Ling, Gillon McLachlan, Matthew Richardson, Warren Tredrea and Kevin Sheehan. The winner was Essendon player Andrew McGrath, who polled 51 votes. McGrath became only the third number-one draft pick to win the award, and the second Essendon recipient.

The club that garnered the most individual nominations this season was Carlton with five players nominated for the award. This was a club record and the equal-second most nominations a club has garnered in an individual season, behind Greater Western Sydney's eight nominations in the 2012 season. Brisbane Lions player Alex Witherden, who received a nomination in round 17, was nominated for the award again in the 2018 season—becoming the eleventh player ever to be nominated twice for a Rising Star award.

== Nominations ==
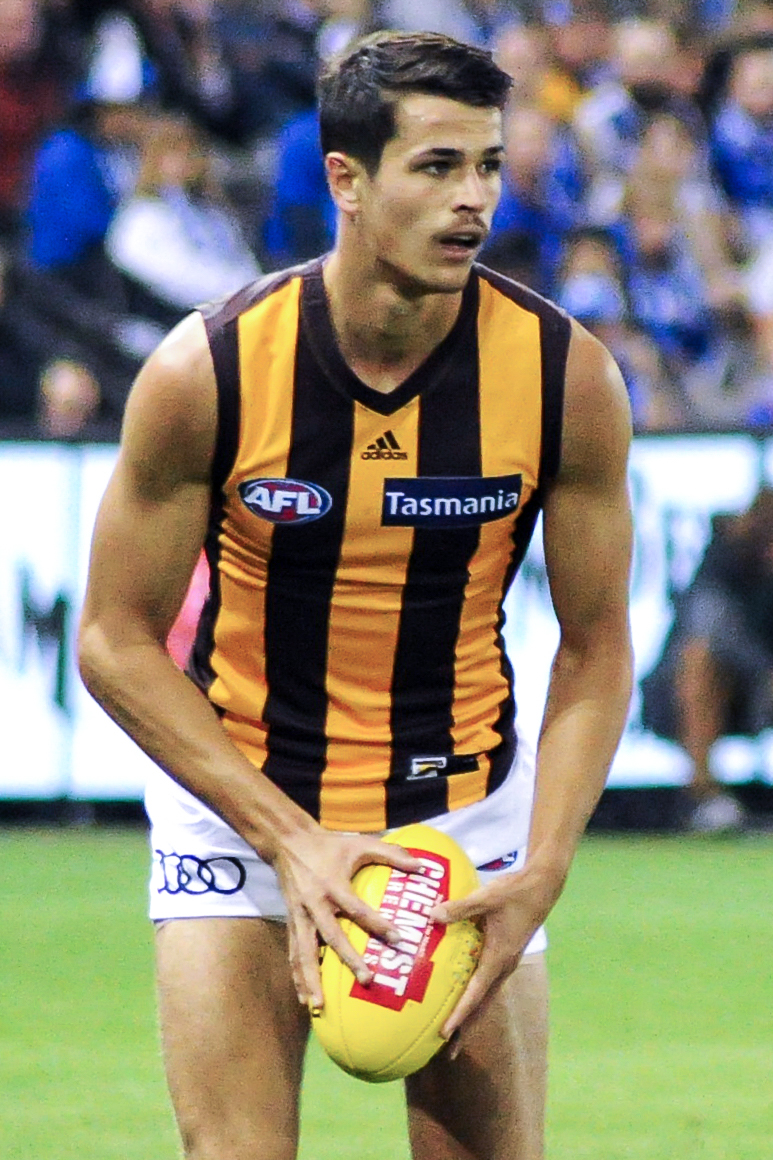
Ryan Burton finished second in the final voting for the season's award, with 41 votes.

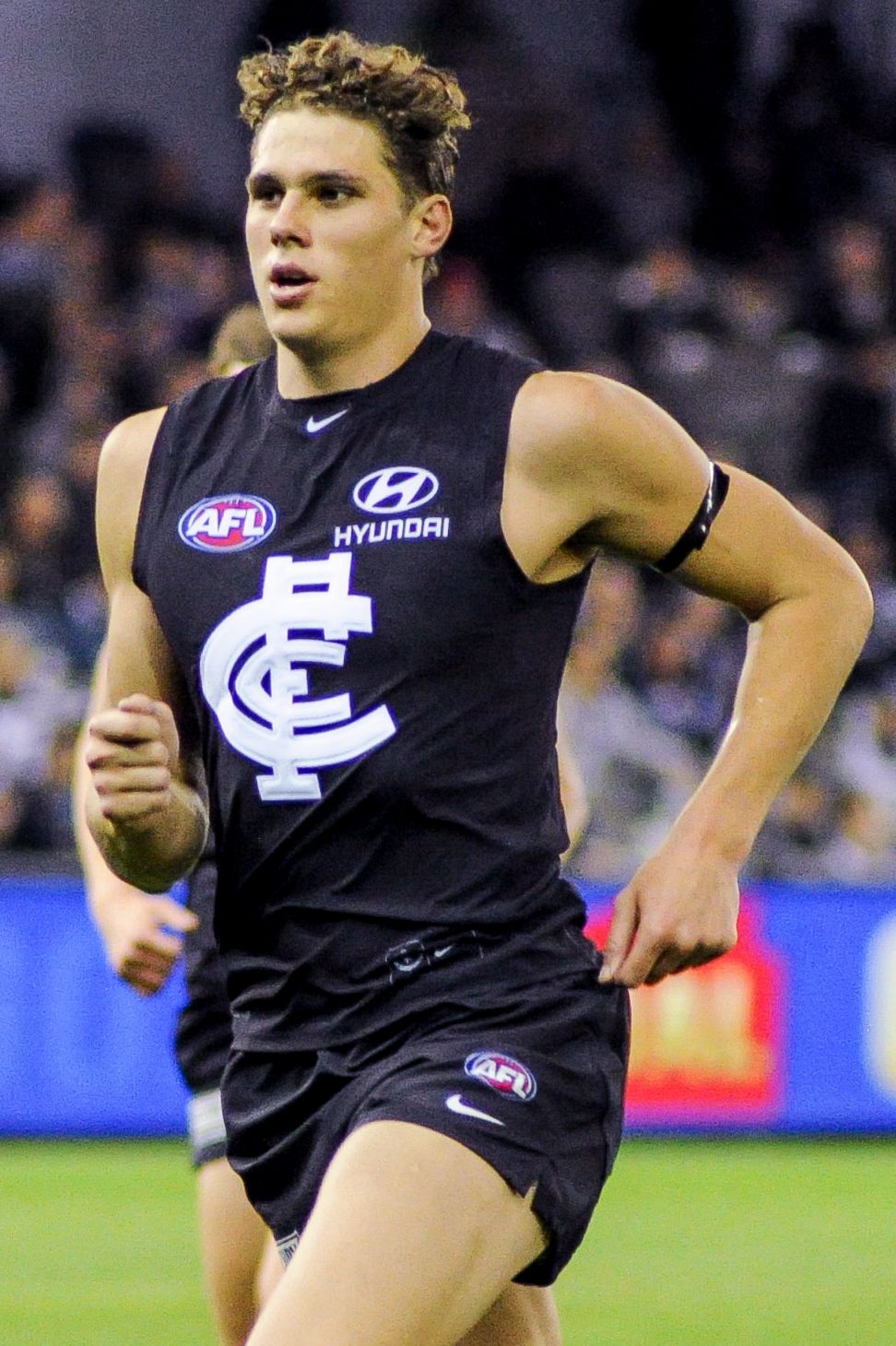
Charlie Curnow was one of five Carlton players to be nominated for the Rising Star in 2017.

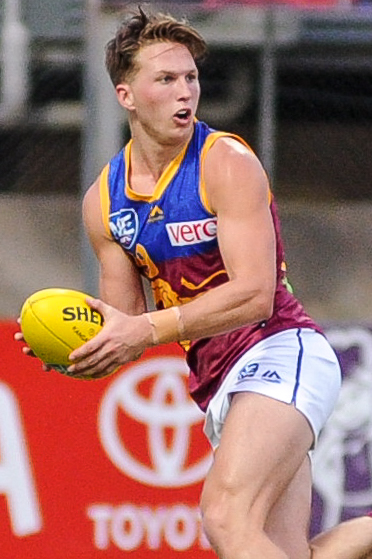
Alex Witherden, who received a nomination in round 17, was also nominated for the award in the 2018 season.

Table of nominees
Player	Round	Club	Ref.
Sam Powell-Pepper	1	Port Adelaide	
Ryan Burton	2	Hawthorn	
Brandan Parfitt	3	Geelong	
Andrew McGrath	4	Essendon	
Eric Hipwood	5	Brisbane Lions	
Caleb Marchbank	6	Carlton	
Sam Petrevski-Seton	7	Carlton	
Tim Taranto	8	Greater Western Sydney	
Tom Phillips	9	Collingwood	
Wayne Milera	10	Adelaide	
Dan Butler	11	Richmond	
David Cuningham	12	Carlton	
Jack Silvagni	13	Carlton	
Hugh McCluggage	14	Brisbane Lions	
Blake Hardwick	15	Hawthorn	
Charlie Curnow	16	Carlton	
Alex Witherden	17	Brisbane Lions	
Lewis Melican	18	Sydney	
Jason Castagna	19	Richmond	
Luke Ryan	20	Fremantle	
Dan Houston	21	Port Adelaide	
Ben Ainsworth	22	Gold Coast	
Will Hayward	23	Sydney	

== Final voting ==
Table of votes
Player	Rank	Club	Votes
Andrew McGrath	1	Essendon	51
Ryan Burton	2	Hawthorn	41
Sam Powell-Pepper	3	Port Adelaide	35
Charlie Curnow	4	Carlton	27
Eric Hipwood	5	Brisbane Lions	6
Sam Petrevski-Seton	6	Carlton	3
Lewis Melican	7	Sydney	1
Tom Phillips	7	Collingwood	1

== See also ==
- 2017 AFL Women's Rising Star
