= Sam Powell-Pepper =

Australian rules footballer (born 1998)

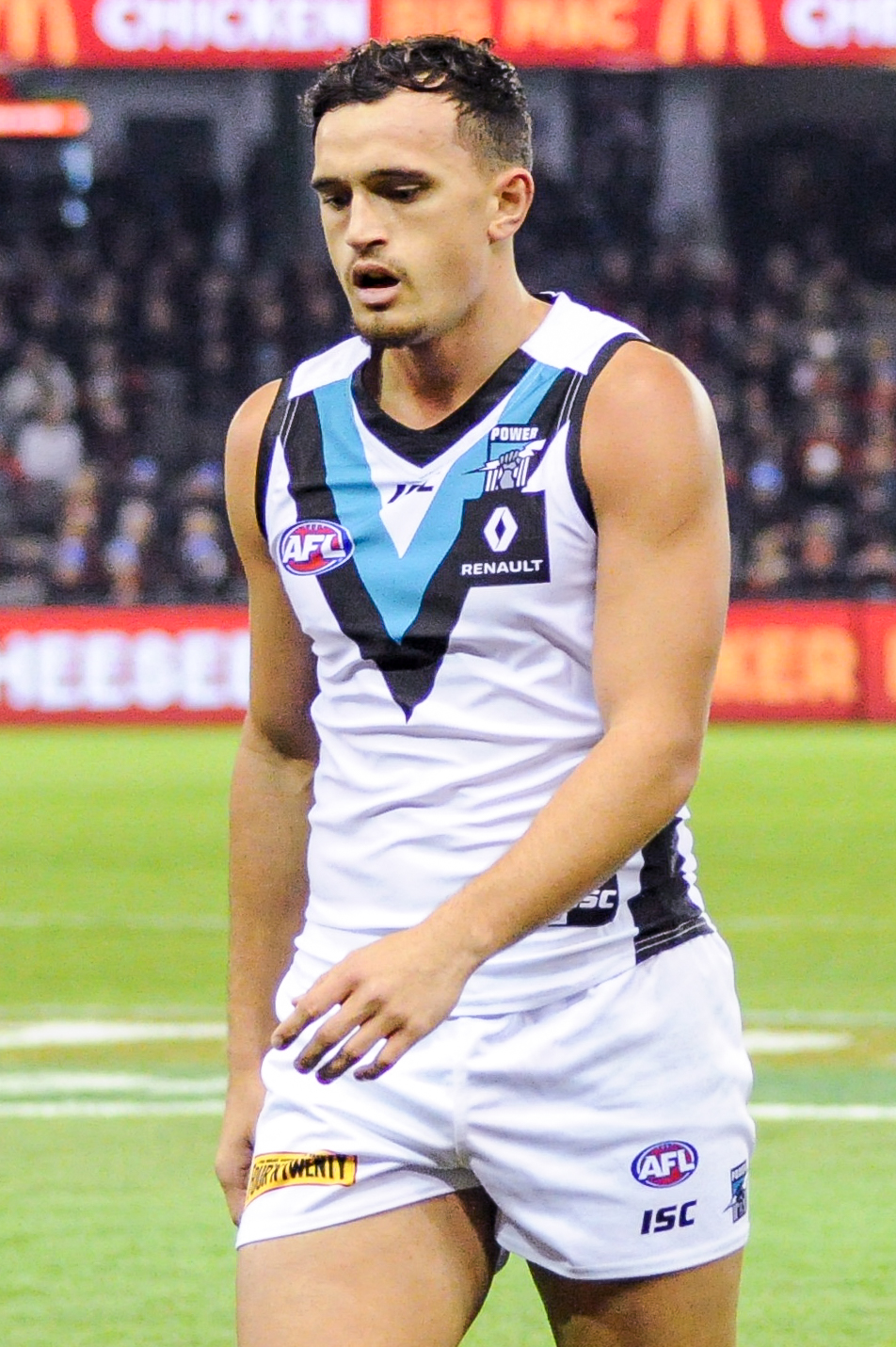
- Powell-Pepper playing for Port Adelaide in June 2017

Personal information
- Full name: Samuel Powell-Pepper
- Born: 8 January 1998 (age 28); Western Australia
- Original team: East Perth (WAFL)/Wesley College (PSA)
- Draft: No. 18, 2016 national draft
- Debut: Round 1, 2017, Sydney vs. Port Adelaide, at Sydney Cricket Ground
- Height: 187 cm (6 ft 2 in)
- Weight: 96 kg (212 lb)
- Position: Forward / midfielder

Club information
- Current club: Port Adelaide
- Number: 2

Playing career^{1}
Years	Club	Games (Goals)
2017–	Port Adelaide	158 (124)
- ^{1} Playing statistics correct to the end of the 2025 season.

Career highlights
- AFL Rising Star nominee (2017); 2× 22under22 team (2018, 2020); Gavin Wanganeen Medal (2017)

Samuel Powell-Pepper (born 8 January 1998) is a professional Australian rules footballer playing for the Port Adelaide Football Club in the Australian Football League (AFL).

== Early life ==
Powell-Pepper was born in Perth, the son of Maureen and Steven. His mother is Aboriginal and Torres Strait Islander and his father is Caucasian. He has two full siblings and two half-brothers. His parents separated when he was young and he lived with his father until he was eight, then spent periods with his paternal grandmother, his mother, and friends' families.

Powell-Pepper initially attended Mount Lawley Senior High School as an inaugural member of the school’s Aboriginal Excellence Program, before switching to Wesley College on an indigenous scholarship. He went to school with Quinton Narkle who is his second cousin. He also attended school with other future AFL players Shai Bolton and Cameron Zurhaar. He played junior football for the Mt Hawthorn Cardinals.

In 2016, Powell-Pepper made his senior debut for the East Perth Football Club during round 20 of the 2016 WAFL season going on to play all the remaining games for the year.

== AFL career ==
Powell-Pepper was drafted by the Port Adelaide Football Club with their second selection and eighteenth overall in the 2016 national draft. He made his AFL debut in Port Adelaide's twenty-eight point win against Sydney in the opening round of the 2017 season at the Sydney Cricket Ground. He was named that round's AFL Rising Star nominee after kicking two goals in the match, the first with his first kick in AFL football. In a game against Melbourne, he recorded 17 tackles, beating the club's previous record which was 16.

== Statistics ==
Updated to the end of the 2025 season.

Legend
G	Goals	K	Kicks	D	Disposals	T	Tackles
B	Behinds	H	Handballs	M	Marks

Season	Team	No.	Games	Totals							Averages (per game)							Votes
Season	Team	No.	Games	G	B	K	H	D	M	T	G	B	K	H	D	M	T	Votes
2017	Port Adelaide	2	22	16	14	182	193	375	57	114	0.7	0.6	8.3	8.8	17.0	2.6	5.2	1
2018	Port Adelaide	2	16	5	13	137	168	305	36	97	0.3	0.8	8.6	10.5	19.1	2.3	6.1	3
2019	Port Adelaide	2	19	10	18	187	171	358	50	92	0.5	0.9	9.8	9.0	18.8	2.6	4.8	1
2020 (Note: The 2020 season was played with 17 home-and-away matches per team (down from 22) and 16-minute quarters with time on (down from 20-minute quarters with time on) due to the impact of the COVID-19 pandemic.)	Port Adelaide	2	19	7	12	123	156	279	36	77	0.4	0.6	6.5	8.2	14.7	1.9	4.1	3
2021	Port Adelaide	2	16	10	8	115	104	219	39	61	0.6	0.5	7.2	6.5	13.7	2.4	3.8	0
2022	Port Adelaide	2	22	24	22	216	149	365	104	74	1.1	1.0	9.8	6.8	16.6	4.7	3.4	11
2023	Port Adelaide	2	25	31	31	202	141	343	64	78	1.2	1.2	8.1	5.6	13.7	2.6	3.1	2
2024	Port Adelaide	2	3	3	4	19	9	28	9	14	1.0	1.3	6.3	3.0	9.3	3.0	4.7	0
2025	Port Adelaide	2	16	18	18	118	116	234	62	44	1.1	1.1	7.4	7.3	14.6	3.9	2.8	2
Career			158	124	140	1299	1207	2506	457	651	0.8	0.9	8.2	7.6	15.9	2.9	4.1	23
