= 2016 AFL draft =

Draft for the Australian Football League

General information
- Dates: 25 November 2016; 28 November 2016
- Time: 7:00 pm AEDT (25 November); 4:00 pm AEDT (28 November)
- Location: Hordern Pavilion, Sydney, New South Wales
- Network: Fox Footy
- Sponsored by: National Australia Bank

Overview
- League: AFL
- First selection: Andrew McGrath (Essendon)

The 2016 AFL draft consisted of the various periods where the 18 clubs in the Australian Football League (AFL) could trade and recruit players following the completion of the 2016 AFL season. Additions to each club's playing list are not allowed at any other time during the year.

The key dates for the trading and drafting periods were:

- The free agency offer period; held between 7 October and 19 October. Three further free agency periods were held for delisted players, between 1 November and 8 November, 10 November to 18 November, and 26 November to 27 November,
- The trade period; held between 10 October and 20 October,
- The 2016 national draft; held on 25 November, at the Hordern Pavilion, which included live bidding for academy and father-son selections.
- The 2017 pre-season draft; which was to be held on 28 November, but was cancelled when all clubs declined to take part, and
- The 2017 rookie draft; which was held on 28 November.

== Player movements ==
=== Previous trades ===
The 2015 AFL draft included a new initiative whereby clubs could trade future picks; through this scheme, fourteen picks in the 2016 draft were traded prior to the commencement of the 2016 trade period:

Round	Original club	New club	How acquired	Ref
1	Collingwood	Greater Western Sydney	Adam Treloar trade	
1	Geelong	Greater Western Sydney	via Carlton (Lachie Henderson trade) on-traded to Greater Western Sydney for Lamb, Phillips, Plowman, Sumner	
1	Melbourne	Gold Coast	Pick swap	
2	Adelaide	Greater Western Sydney	Curtly Hampton trade	
2	Fremantle	Gold Coast	Pick swap	
2	Port Adelaide	Gold Coast	Charlie Dixon trade	
2	Richmond	Gold Coast	Charlie Dixon trade	
2	St Kilda	Brisbane Lions	via Collingwood (Nathan Freeman trade) on-traded to Brisbane Lions for James Aish	
3	Brisbane Lions	Geelong	Jarrad Jansen and Josh Walker trade	
3	North Melbourne	Brisbane Lions	Ryan Bastinac trade	
3	Western Bulldogs	Carlton	Pick swap	
4	Carlton	Western Bulldogs	Pick swap	
4	Sydney	Western Bulldogs	Michael Talia trade	
5	Greater Western Sydney	Geelong	Steve Johnson trade	

=== Trades ===
2016 AFL trade period
No.	Player(s)	Traded from	Traded to	Traded for	Ref
1	Cam McCarthy	Greater Western Sydney	Fremantle	Pick 3	
1	Pick 7	Greater Western Sydney	Fremantle	Pick 3	
1	Pick 34	Greater Western Sydney	Fremantle	Pick 3	
1	Pick 72	Greater Western Sydney	Fremantle	Pick 3	
2	Bradley Hill	Hawthorn	Fremantle	Pick 23	
3	Pick 2	Brisbane Lions	Greater Western Sydney	Pick 3	
3	Pick 31	Brisbane Lions	Greater Western Sydney	Pick 3	
3	Pick 51	Brisbane Lions	Greater Western Sydney	Pick 16	
3	Pick 60	Brisbane Lions	Greater Western Sydney	Pick 16	
4	Jack Steele	Greater Western Sydney	St Kilda	2017 second round pick (St Kilda)	
5	Sam Mitchell	Hawthorn	West Coast	Pick 52	
5	Pick 54	Hawthorn	West Coast	Pick 70	
5	Pick 72	Hawthorn	West Coast	Pick 88	
6	Tom Mitchell	Sydney	Hawthorn	Pick 14	
6	Pick 57	Sydney	Hawthorn	Pick 52	
7	Pick 10	St Kilda	Hawthorn	2017 first round pick (Hawthorn)	
7	Pick 10	St Kilda	Hawthorn	Pick 23	
7	Pick 68	St Kilda	Hawthorn	Pick 36	
8	Paul Ahern	Greater Western Sydney	North Melbourne	Pick 69	
9	Pearce Hanley	Brisbane Lions	Gold Coast	Pick 22	
9	Pick 19	Brisbane Lions	Port Adelaide	2017 first round pick (Port Adelaide)	
9	Pick 30	Gold Coast	Port Adelaide	Pick 67	
10	Jordan Lewis	Hawthorn	Melbourne	Pick 48	
10	Pick 57	Hawthorn	Melbourne	Pick 48	
10	Pick 68	Hawthorn	Melbourne	Pick 66	
11	Joel Hamling	Western Bulldogs	Fremantle	Pick 35	
11	Pick 40	Western Bulldogs	Fremantle	Pick 43	
11	Pick 63	Western Bulldogs	Fremantle	Pick 61	
12	Michael Hibberd	Essendon	Melbourne	Pick 29	
12	Pick 59	Essendon	Melbourne	Pick 68	
13	Dion Prestia	Gold Coast	Richmond	Pick 6	
13	Pick 24	Gold Coast	Richmond	2017 second round pick (Richmond)	
14	Toby Nankervis	Sydney	Richmond	Pick 46	
15	Jarrod Witts	Collingwood	Gold Coast	Pick 44	
15	Jarrod Witts	Collingwood	Gold Coast	Pick 62	
16	Pick 26	Gold Coast	Western Bulldogs	Pick 35	
16	Pick 80	Gold Coast	Western Bulldogs	Pick 43	
17	Nathan Hrovat	Western Bulldogs	North Melbourne	2017 third round pick (North Melbourne)	
17	2017 third round pick (Western Bulldogs)	Western Bulldogs	North Melbourne	2017 third round pick (North Melbourne)	
17	2017 fourth round pick (Western Bulldogs)	Western Bulldogs	North Melbourne	2017 fourth round pick (North Melbourne)	
18	Shane Kersten	Geelong	Fremantle	Pick 63	
19	Billie Smedts	Geelong	Carlton	Zach Tuohy	
19	Pick 63	Geelong	Carlton	Zach Tuohy	
19	2017 first round pick (Geelong)	Geelong	Carlton	2017 second round pick (Carlton)	
20	Josh Caddy	Geelong	Richmond	Pick 24	
20	Pick 56	Geelong	Richmond	Pick 64	
21	Pick 31	Greater Western Sydney	Sydney	Pick 39	
21	Pick 31	Greater Western Sydney	Sydney	Pick 52	
22	Jarryd Lyons	Adelaide	Gold Coast	Pick 43	
22	Pick 71	Adelaide	Gold Coast	Pick 67	
23	Pat McKenna	Greater Western Sydney	Melbourne	Pick 57	
23	Pick 51	Greater Western Sydney	Melbourne	Pick 57	
23	Pick 69	Greater Western Sydney	Melbourne	Pick 59	
24	Nathan Vardy	Geelong	West Coast	Pick 72	
25	Travis Cloke	Collingwood	Western Bulldogs	Pick 76	
26	James Stewart	Greater Western Sydney	Essendon	Pick 77	
27	Aaron Black	North Melbourne	Geelong	Pick 92	
28	Will Hoskin-Elliott	Greater Western Sydney	Collingwood	2017 second round pick (Collingwood)	
29	Jack Frost	Collingwood	Brisbane Lions	2017 third round pick (Brisbane Lions)	
29	Pick 76	Collingwood	Brisbane Lions	2017 third round pick (Brisbane Lions)	
29	2017 third round pick (Collingwood)	Collingwood	Brisbane Lions	2017 fourth round pick (Brisbane Lions)	
30	Lynden Dunn	Melbourne	Collingwood	Pick 47	
30	Pick 51	Melbourne	Collingwood	Pick 47	
31	Marley Williams	Collingwood	North Melbourne	Pick 105	
32	Koby Stevens	Western Bulldogs	St Kilda	Pick 50	
32	Pick 61	Western Bulldogs	St Kilda	Pick 50	
32	2017 fourth round pick (North Melbourne)	Western Bulldogs	St Kilda	2017 fifth round pick (St Kilda)	
33	Brett Deledio	Richmond	Greater Western Sydney	2017 first round pick (Geelong)	
33	Brett Deledio	Richmond	Greater Western Sydney	2017 third round pick (Greater Western Sydney)	
34	Caleb Marchbank	Greater Western Sydney	Carlton	Pick 45	
34	Jarrod Pickett	Greater Western Sydney	Carlton	Pick 58	
34	2017 second round pick (Greater Western Sydney)	Greater Western Sydney	Carlton	2017 first round pick (Geelong)	
35	Rhys Palmer	Greater Western Sydney	Carlton	Pick 135	
36	Pick 35	Gold Coast	Fremantle	Pick 73	
36	Pick 71	Gold Coast	Fremantle	Pick 73	
36	2017 fourth round pick (Gold Coast)	Gold Coast	Fremantle	2017 second round pick (Fremantle)	
37	Jaeger O'Meara	Gold Coast	Hawthorn	Pick 10	
37	Jaeger O'Meara	Gold Coast	Hawthorn	2017 second round pick (Hawthorn)	
38	Pick 9	Port Adelaide	Sydney	Pick 14	
38	Pick 19	Port Adelaide	Sydney	Pick 17	
38	Pick 49	Port Adelaide	Sydney	Pick 31	
39	Pick 48	Hawthorn	Carlton	2017 second round pick (Greater Western Sydney)	
39	Pick 66	Hawthorn	Carlton	2017 second round pick (Greater Western Sydney)	
39	Pick 70	Hawthorn	Carlton	2017 second round pick (Greater Western Sydney)	

Note

- The numbering of the draft picks in this list may be different to the agreed draft picks at the time of the trade, due to adjustments from either the insertion of free agency compensation draft picks or clubs exiting the draft before later rounds.

=== Free agency ===
2016 AFL free agency period signings
Player	Date	Free agent type	Former club	New club	Compensation	Ref
Ty Vickery	10 October 2016	Restricted	Richmond	Hawthorn	2nd round	
Daniel Wells	11 October 2016	Unrestricted	North Melbourne	Collingwood	2nd round	
Chris Mayne	12 October 2016	Unrestricted	Fremantle	Collingwood	2nd round	
Nathan Brown	16 October 2016	Restricted	Collingwood	St Kilda	None	
James Kelly	4 November 2016	Delisted	Essendon	Essendon	—N/a	
Matt Dea	4 November 2016	Delisted	Essendon	Essendon	—N/a	
Michael Barlow	8 November 2016	Delisted	Fremantle	Gold Coast	—N/a	
Ricky Henderson	8 November 2016	Delisted	Adelaide	Hawthorn	—N/a	
Josh Green	15 November 2016	Delisted	Brisbane Lions	Essendon	—N/a	

Note

- Due to James Kelly and Matt Dea being signed as top up players because of the 2012 Essendon supplements saga, they had to be delisted and then re-signed in order to stay on Essendon's list.

=== Retirements and delistings ===
List of 2016 AFL player changes

Name	Club	Date	Notes	Ref.
Damien Cavka	West Coast	25 January 2016	Retired due to ongoing foot injury, effective immediately	
Matthew Jaensch	Adelaide	26 February 2016	Retired due to no longer having a passion for playing professionally	
Shem-Kelvin Tatupu	Hawthorn	15 March 2016	Retired due to losing passion for the game	
Justin Clarke	Brisbane Lions	31 March 2016	Retired due to ongoing concussion, effective immediately	
Reece McKenzie	Richmond	30 June 2016	Retired due to mental illness, effective immediately	
Troy Chaplin	Richmond	19 July 2016	Retired, effective immediately	
Luke Goetz	Western Bulldogs	20 July 2016	Delisted	
Matthew Pavlich	Fremantle	26 July 2016	Retired, effective at the end of the season	
Andrew Walker	Carlton	2 August 2016	Retired, effective after round 20	
Ted Richards	Sydney	5 August 2016	Retired, effective at the end of the season	
Michael Jamison	Carlton	8 August 2016	Retired, effective immediately	
Xavier Ellis	West Coast	9 August 2016	Retired, effective immediately	
Trent West	Brisbane Lions	15 August 2016	Retired, effective at the end of the season	
Adam Cooney	Essendon	16 August 2016	Retired, effective after round 22	
Daniel Merrett	Brisbane Lions	16 August 2016	Retired, effective at the end of the season	
Mathew Stokes	Essendon	18 August 2016	Retired, effective after round 22	
Brent Macaffer	Collingwood	22 August 2016	Retired, effective at the end of the season	
Alan Toovey	Collingwood	22 August 2016	Retired, effective at the end of the season	
Dane Swan	Collingwood	23 August 2016	Retired, effective immediately	
Nick Dal Santo	North Melbourne	24 August 2016	Retired	
Michael Firrito	North Melbourne	24 August 2016	Retired	
Brent Harvey	North Melbourne	24 August 2016	Retired	
Drew Petrie	North Melbourne	24 August 2016	Delisted	
Jed Adcock	Western Bulldogs	24 August 2016	Retired, effective at the end of the season	
Jay Schulz	Port Adelaide	25 August 2016	Delisted	
Ryan Crowley	Essendon	27 August 2016	Delisted	
Matt Dea	Essendon	27 August 2016	Delisted	
Nathan Grima	Essendon	27 August 2016	Delisted	
Sam Grimley	Essendon	27 August 2016	Delisted	
Mark Jamar	Essendon	27 August 2016	Delisted	
James Kelly	Essendon	27 August 2016	Delisted	
Sam Michael	Essendon	27 August 2016	Delisted	
James Polkinghorne	Essendon	27 August 2016	Delisted	
Jonathan Simpkin	Essendon	27 August 2016	Delisted	
Cameron Wood	Carlton	30 August 2016	Retired	
Matthew Dick	Carlton	30 August 2016	Delisted	
Jayden Foster	Carlton	30 August 2016	Delisted	
John Butcher	Port Adelaide	30 August 2016	Delisted	
Sam Colquhoun	Port Adelaide	30 August 2016	Delisted	
Kane Mitchell	Port Adelaide	30 August 2016	Delisted	
Sean Hurley	Fremantle	30 August 2016	Delisted	
Alipate Carlile	Port Adelaide	31 August 2016	Retired	
Adam Marcon	Richmond	31 August 2016	Delisted	
Liam McBean	Richmond	31 August 2016	Delisted	
Tom Curren	St Kilda	31 August 2016	Delisted	
Luke Delaney	St Kilda	31 August 2016	Delisted	
Brenton Payne	St Kilda	31 August 2016	Delisted	
Josh Saunders	St Kilda	31 August 2016	Delisted	
Tom Keough	Gold Coast	1 September 2016	Delisted	
Luke Russell	Gold Coast	1 September 2016	Delisted	
Danny Stanley	Gold Coast	1 September 2016	Delisted	
Seb Tape	Gold Coast	1 September 2016	Delisted	
Tanner Smith	Fremantle	2 September 2016	Delisted	
James Gwilt	Essendon	2 September 2016	Delisted	
Nathan van Berlo	Adelaide	5 September 2016	Retired, effective immediately	
Hugh Beasley	Brisbane Lions	5 September 2016	Delisted	
Billy Evans	Brisbane Lions	5 September 2016	Delisted	
Josh McGuinness	Brisbane Lions	5 September 2016	Delisted	
Jackson Paine	Brisbane Lions	5 September 2016	Delisted	
Josh Watts	Brisbane Lions	5 September 2016	Delisted	
Anthony Morabito	Fremantle	6 September 2016	Delisted	
Tayte Pears	Essendon	9 September 2016	Retired	
Clem Smith	Carlton	9 September 2016	Delisted	
Patrick McGinnity	West Coast	12 September 2016	Delisted	
Jamie Bennell	West Coast	12 September 2016	Delisted	
Kane Lucas	West Coast	12 September 2016	Delisted	
Brant Colledge	West Coast	12 September 2016	Delisted	
Alec Waterman	West Coast	12 September 2016	Delisted	
Corey Adamson	West Coast	12 September 2016	Delisted	
Farren Ray	North Melbourne	14 September 2016	Retired	
Robin Nahas	North Melbourne	14 September 2016	Delisted	
Jason Ashby	Essendon	16 September 2016	Delisted	
Shaun Edwards	Essendon	19 September 2016	Delisted	
Tom Wallis	Essendon	20 September 2016	Delisted	
Tim Golds	Collingwood	21 September 2016	Delisted	
Matthew Goodyear	Collingwood	21 September 2016	Delisted	
Darrean Wyatt	Collingwood	21 September 2016	Delisted	
Luke Lowden	Adelaide	23 September 2016	Delisted	
Keenan Ramsey	Adelaide	23 September 2016	Delisted	
Zac Bates	Geelong	27 September 2016	Delisted	
Jock Cornell	Geelong	27 September 2016	Delisted	
Cameron Delaney	Geelong	27 September 2016	Delisted	
Padraig Lucey	Geelong	27 September 2016	Delisted	
Tom Read	Geelong	27 September 2016	Delisted	
Jack Grimes	Melbourne	27 September 2016	Delisted	
Matt Jones	Melbourne	27 September 2016	Delisted	
Dean Terlich	Melbourne	27 September 2016	Delisted	
Matt de Boer	Fremantle	4 October 2016	Delisted	
Josh Deluca	Fremantle	4 October 2016	Delisted	
Brady Grey	Fremantle	4 October 2016	Delisted	
Jack Hannath	Fremantle	4 October 2016	Delisted	
Tendai Mzungu	Fremantle	4 October 2016	Delisted	
Clancee Pearce	Fremantle	4 October 2016	Delisted	
Corey Enright	Geelong	5 October 2016	Retired	
Ben McGlynn	Sydney	6 October 2016	Retired	
Tom Derickx	Sydney	6 October 2016	Retired	
Kyle Galloway	Sydney	6 October 2016	Delisted	
Joel Patfull	Greater Western Sydney	12 October 2016	Retired	
Jimmy Bartel	Geelong	19 October 2016	Retired	
Chris Dawes	Melbourne	21 October 2016	Delisted	
Max King	Melbourne	21 October 2016	Delisted	
Viv Michie	Melbourne	21 October 2016	Delisted	
Ben Newton	Melbourne	21 October 2016	Delisted	
Michael Barlow	Fremantle	24 October 2016	Delisted	
Mitch Clark	Geelong	24 October 2016	Delisted	
Paul Stewart	Port Adelaide	24 October 2016	Delisted	
Josh Green	Brisbane Lions	25 October 2016	Delisted	
Andrejs Everitt	Carlton	25 October 2016	Delisted	
Andrew Gallucci	Carlton	25 October 2016	Delisted	
Billy Gowers	Carlton	25 October 2016	Delisted	
Jason Tutt	Carlton	25 October 2016	Delisted	
Dillon Viojo-Rainbow	Carlton	25 October 2016	Delisted	
Mark Whiley	Carlton	25 October 2016	Delisted	
Michael Luxford	Geelong	26 October 2016	Delisted	
Brad McKenzie	North Melbourne	26 October 2016	Delisted	
Joel Tippett	North Melbourne	26 October 2016	Delisted	
Yestin Eades	Essendon	26 October 2016	Delisted	
Nick Kommer	Essendon	26 October 2016	Delisted	
Alex Silvagni	Fremantle	26 October 2016	Delisted	
Xavier Richards	Sydney	27 October 2016	Delisted	
Jack Hiscox	Sydney	27 October 2016	Delisted	
Abe Davis	Sydney	27 October 2016	Delisted	
Nick Malceski	Gold Coast	27 October 2016	Retired	
Corey Gault	Collingwood	28 October 2016	Retired	
Jack Fitzpatrick	Hawthorn	28 October 2016	Delisted	
Lachlan Langford	Hawthorn	28 October 2016	Delisted	
Angus Litherland	Hawthorn	28 October 2016	Delisted	
Jermaine Miller-Lewis	Hawthorn	28 October 2016	Delisted	
Matt Spangher	Hawthorn	28 October 2016	Delisted	
Zac Webster	Hawthorn	28 October 2016	Delisted	
Alex Woodward	Hawthorn	28 October 2016	Delisted	
Keegan Brooksby	Gold Coast	28 October 2016	Delisted	
Clay Cameron	Gold Coast	28 October 2016	Delisted	
Cameron Loersch	Gold Coast	28 October 2016	Delisted	
Henry Schade	Gold Coast	28 October 2016	Delisted	
Courtenay Dempsey	Essendon	28 October 2016	Delisted	
Will Hams	Essendon	28 October 2016	Delisted	
Gach Nyuon	Essendon	28 October 2016	Delisted	
Will Minson	Western Bulldogs	28 October 2016	Delisted	
Josh Prudden	Western Bulldogs	28 October 2016	Delisted	
Tom Lee	St Kilda	28 October 2016	Delisted	
Brodie Murdoch	St Kilda	28 October 2016	Delisted	
Cameron Shenton	St Kilda	28 October 2016	Delisted	
Eli Templeton	St Kilda	28 October 2016	Delisted	
Andrew Moore	Richmond	28 October 2016	Delisted	
Cam O'Shea	Port Adelaide	30 October 2016	Delisted	
Mitch Grigg	Adelaide	31 October 2016	Delisted	
Ricky Henderson	Adelaide	31 October 2016	Delisted	
Sam Fisher	St Kilda	31 October 2016	Retired	
Mitch Brown	West Coast	31 October 2016	Delisted	
Fraser McInnes	West Coast	31 October 2016	Delisted	
Jake Barrett	Greater Western Sydney	2 November 2016	Delisted	
Jarrod Garlett	Gold Coast	8 November 2016	Delisted	
Shaun McKernan	Essendon	9 November 2016	Delisted	
Sam Shaw	Adelaide	9 November 2016	Retired due to ongoing concussion	
Jaden McGrath	Brisbane Lions	9 November 2016	Retired due to losing passion for the game	
Jonathon Marsh	Collingwood	9 November 2016	Retired	

== 2016 national draft ==
The Brisbane Lions received a priority pick at the end of the first round (pick 19) after a request by the club to the AFL commission was accepted. It was the first time a priority pick was given to a club since the rules regarding priority selections were changed in 2012. This pick was later on-traded to Port Adelaide as part of the Pearce Hanley trade to Gold Coast, before the Sydney Swans ended up with it by the trade deadline.

A change was made to the rules concerning academy and father-son selections which allowed clubs to begin the draft with only as many draft picks as it had empty positions on its playing list. This was intended to end the practice which had taken place the previous year in which clubs with academies had traded down the draft order to accumulate a large number of mid- and low-range draft picks specifically to use on academy bids.

Final draft order

^	Denotes player who has been inducted to the Australian Football Hall of Fame
*	Denotes player who has been a premiership player and been selected for at least one All-Australian team
^{+}	Denotes player who has been a premiership player at least once
^{x}	Denotes player who has been selected for at least one All-Australian team
^{#}	Denotes player who has never played in a VFL/AFL home and away season or finals game
^{~}	Denotes player who has been selected as Rising Star

Round	Pick	Player	Drafted to	Recruited from	League	Notes
1	1	Andrew McGrath	Essendon	Sandringham Dragons	TAC Cup	
1	2	Tim Taranto	Greater Western Sydney	Sandringham Dragons	TAC Cup	Traded from Brisbane Lions
1	3	Hugh McCluggage	Brisbane Lions	North Ballarat Rebels	TAC Cup	Traded from Greater Western Sydney; received from Fremantle
1	4	Ben Ainsworth	Gold Coast	Gippsland Power	TAC Cup	
1	5	Will Setterfield	Greater Western Sydney	Sandringham Dragons	TAC Cup	Academy player, Carlton's bid matched with picks 15 and 37.
1	6	Sam Petrevski-Seton	Carlton	Claremont	WAFL	
1	7	Jack Scrimshaw	Gold Coast	Sandringham Dragons	TAC Cup	Traded from Richmond
1	8	Griffin Logue	Fremantle	Swan Districts	WAFL	Traded from Greater Western Sydney; received from Collingwood
1	9	Will Brodie	Gold Coast	Murray Bushrangers	TAC Cup	Traded from Melbourne
1	10	Jack Bowes	Gold Coast	Cairns	AFL Cairns	Academy player, Sydney's bid matched with pick 11.
1	11	Oliver Florent	Sydney	Sandringham Dragons	TAC Cup	Traded from Port Adelaide
1	12	Jy Simpkin	North Melbourne	Murray Bushrangers	TAC Cup	
1	13	Daniel Venables	West Coast	Western Jets	TAC Cup	
1	14	Harry Perryman	Greater Western Sydney	Collingullie-Glenfield Park	RFNL	Academy player, Adelaide's bid matched with picks 38, 44 and 51.
1	15	Jordan Gallucci	Adelaide	Eastern Ranges	TAC Cup	
1	16	Todd Marshall	Port Adelaide	Murray Bushrangers	TAC Cup	Traded from Sydney; received from Hawthorn
1	17	Jarrod Berry	Brisbane Lions	North Ballarat Rebels	TAC Cup	Traded from Greater Western Sydney; received from Carlton; received from Geelong
1	18	Sam Powell-Pepper	Port Adelaide	East Perth	WAFL	Traded from Sydney
1	19	Tim English	Western Bulldogs	South Fremantle	WAFL	
1	20	Isaac Cumming	Greater Western Sydney	North Broken Hill	BHFL	Academy player, Sydney's bid matched with picks 52, 54, 55 and 56.
Priority	21	Will Hayward	Sydney	North Adelaide	SANFL	Traded from Port Adelaide; received from Brisbane Lions
2	22	Jordan Ridley	Essendon	Oakleigh Chargers	TAC Cup	
2	23	Alex Witherden	Brisbane Lions	Geelong Falcons	TAC Cup	
2	24	Cedric Cox	Brisbane Lions	North Ballarat Rebels	TAC Cup	Traded from Gold Coast; received from Fremantle
2	25	Ben Long	St Kilda	NT Thunder	NEAFL	Traded from Hawthorn; received from Fremantle; free agency compensation pick (Mayne)
2	26	Brandan Parfitt	Geelong	NT Thunder	NEAFL	Traded from Richmond; received from Gold Coast
2	27	Zac Fisher	Carlton	Perth	WAFL	
2	28	Patrick Lipinski	Western Bulldogs	Northern Knights	TAC Cup	Traded from Gold Coast; received from Richmond
2	29	Shai Bolton	Richmond	South Fremantle	WAFL	Free agency compensation pick (Vickery)
2	30	Sam McLarty	Collingwood	Oakleigh Chargers	TAC Cup	
2	31	Josh Begley	Essendon	Eastern Ranges	TAC Cup	Traded from Melbourne
2	32	Joe Atley	Port Adelaide	Bendigo Pioneers	TAC Cup	Traded from Gold Coast; received from Port Adelaide
2	33	Willem Drew	Port Adelaide	North Ballarat Rebels	TAC Cup	Traded from Sydney; received from Greater Western Sydney; received from Brisbane Lions; received from Collingwood; received from St Kilda
2	34	Declan Watson	North Melbourne	Aspley	NEAFL	Academy eligible, but the Brisbane Lions did not match the bid
2	35	Callum Brown	Collingwood	Eastern Ranges	TAC Cup	Father–son rule selection (son of Gavin Brown); North Melbourne's bid matched with pick 44.
2	36	Josh Williams	North Melbourne	Surfers Paradise	QAFL	Free agency compensation pick (Wells)
2	37	Josh Rotham	West Coast	West Perth	WAFL	
2	38	Sean Darcy	Fremantle	Geelong Falcons	TAC Cup	Traded from Gold Coast, received from Western Bulldogs; received from Fremantle; received from Greater Western Sydney; received from Adelaide
2	39	Josh Battle	St Kilda	Dandenong Stingrays	TAC Cup	Traded from Hawthorn
2	40	Tom Stewart	Geelong	Geelong	VFL	
2	41	Brennan Cox	Fremantle	Woodville-West Torrens	SANFL	Traded from Western Bulldogs
3	42	Kobe Mutch	Essendon	Bendigo Pioneers	TAC Cup	Academy eligible, but Greater Western Sydney did not match the bid
3	43	Esava Ratugolea	Geelong	Murray Bushrangers	TAC Cup	Traded from Brisbane Lions
3	44	Myles Poholke	Adelaide	Dandenong Stingrays	TAC Cup	Traded from Gold Coast; received from Western Bulldogs; received from Fremantle
3	45	Jack Maibaum	Sydney	Eastern Ranges	TAC Cup	Traded from Richmond
3	46	Mitch Hannan	Melbourne	Footscray	VFL	Traded from Collingwood
3	47	Harrison Macreadie	Carlton	Henty	HFL	Academy eligible, but Greater Western Sydney did not match the bid; traded from Hawthorn; received from Melbourne
3	48	Darcy Cameron	Sydney	Claremont	WAFL	Traded from Port Adelaide
3	49	Lewis Young	Western Bulldogs	Sturt	SANFL	Traded from St Kilda
3	50	Kayle Kirby	Collingwood	Bendigo Pioneers	TAC Cup	Traded from Melbourne; received from Greater Western Sydney; received from Brisbane Lions; received from North Melbourne
3	51	Elliott Himmelberg	Adelaide	Redland	NEAFL	
3	52	Willie Rioli	West Coast	Glenelg	SANFL	Traded from Hawthorn
3	53	Jack Graham	Richmond	North Adelaide	SANFL	Traded from Geelong
4	54	Lachlan Tiziani	Greater Western Sydney	Murray Bushrangers	TAC Cup	Academy player, traded from Melbourne; received from Essendon
4	55	Jacob Allison	Brisbane Lions	Aspley	NEAFL	Academy player
4	56	Ed Phillips	St Kilda	Oakleigh Chargers	TAC Cup	Traded from Western Bulldogs, received from Fremantle
4	57	Josh Daicos	Collingwood	Oakleigh Chargers	TAC Cup	Father–son rule selection (son of Peter Daicos); traded from Gold Coast
4	58	Matt de Boer	Greater Western Sydney	Fremantle	AFL	
4	59	Cameron Polson	Carlton	Sandringham Dragons	TAC Cup	Traded from Geelong; received from Fremantle; received from Western Bulldogs; received from Carlton
4	60	Quinton Narkle	Geelong	Perth	WAFL	Traded from Richmond
4	61	Tom Williamson	Carlton	North Ballarat Rebels	TAC Cup	Traded from Hawthorn; received from Melbourne
4	62	Matthew Signorello	Adelaide	Northern Knights	TAC Cup	Traded from Gold Coast; received from Port Adelaide
4	63	Dylan Clarke	Essendon	Eastern Ranges	TAC Cup	Traded from Melbourne; received Hawthorn; received from St Kilda
4	64	Dion Johnstone	Melbourne	Oakleigh Chargers	TAC Cup	Traded from Greater Western Sydney; received from North Melbourne
4	65	Pat Kerr	Carlton	Oakleigh Chargers	TAC Cup	Traded from Hawthorn; received from West Coast
4	66	Luke Ryan	Fremantle	Coburg	VFL	Traded from Gold Coast, received from Adelaide
4	67	Brad Scheer	Gold Coast	Palm Beach Currumbin	QAFL	Academy player
4	68	Timm House	Geelong	Geelong	VFL	Traded from West Coast; received from Hawthorn
4	69	Ryan Abbott	Geelong	Grovedale	GFL	
4	70	Fergus Greene	Western Bulldogs	Bendigo Pioneers	TAC Cup	Traded from Sydney
5	71	Corey Lyons	Brisbane Lions	Sandringham Dragons	TAC Cup	Traded from Collingwood, received from Western Bulldogs
5	72	Ryan Garthwaite	Richmond	Murray Bushrangers	TAC Cup	Academy eligible, but Greater Western Sydney did not match the bid
5	73	Nick Larkey	North Melbourne	Oakleigh Chargers	TAC Cup	
5	74	Harry Morrison	Hawthorn	Murray Bushrangers	TAC Cup	Traded from West Coast
5	75	Ben Davis	Adelaide	UNSW	Sydney AFL	Academy eligible, but Sydney did not match the bid
5	76	Mitchell Lewis	Hawthorn	Calder Cannons	TAC Cup	
6	77	Jake Waterman	West Coast	Claremont	WAFL	Father–son rule selection (son of Chris Waterman)

Notes

- Free agency compensation picks are additional selections awarded to teams based on their net loss of players during the free agency trade period.
- Academy players are local zone selections available to the four New South Wales and Queensland clubs. Both academy and father-son selections are subject to a bidding process, where the club with the family or academy connection must match any opposition club's bid with their next available selection.

=== Rookie elevations ===
Clubs were able to promote any player who was listed on their rookie list in 2016 to their 2017 primary playing list prior to the draft.

Player	Club	Ref.
Reilly O'Brien	Adelaide	
Archie Smith	Brisbane Lions	
Ciaran Byrne	Carlton	
Lachlan Keeffe	Collingwood	
Josh Smith	Collingwood	
Anthony McDonald-Tipungwuti	Essendon	
Conor McKenna	Essendon	
Tom Ruggles	Geelong	
Jesse Joyce	Gold Coast	
Kade Stewart	Hawthorn	
Josh Wagner	Melbourne	
Majak Daw	North Melbourne	
Braydon Preuss	North Melbourne	
Nathan Krakouer	Port Adelaide	
Jayden Short	Richmond	
Jason Holmes	St Kilda	
Tom Papley	Sydney	
Nic Newman	Sydney	
Harrison Marsh	Sydney	
Jordan Foote	Sydney	

== 2017 rookie draft ==
Round	Pick	Player	Drafted to	Recruited from	League	Notes
1	1	Sam Draper	Essendon	South Adelaide	SANFL	
1	2	Jake Barrett	Brisbane Lions	Greater Western Sydney	AFL	
1	3	Taylin Duman	Fremantle	Oakleigh Chargers	TAC Cup	
1	4	Keegan Brooksby	Gold Coast	Gold Coast	AFL	
1	5	Kym LeBois	Carlton	North Adelaide	SANFL	
1	6	Tyson Stengle	Richmond	Woodville-West Torrens	SANFL	
1	7	Mitch McCarthy	Collingwood	Dandenong Stingrays	TAC Cup	
1	8	Lachlan Filipovic	Melbourne	Sandringham Dragons	TAC Cup	
1	9	Peter Ladhams	Port Adelaide	Norwood	SANFL	
1	10	Rowan Marshall	St Kilda	North Ballarat	VFL	
1	11	Cameron Zurhaar	North Melbourne	East Fremantle	WAFL	
1	12	Thomas Gorter	West Coast	East Perth	WAFL	
1	13	Sam Shaw	Adelaide	Adelaide	AFL	Shaw retired on 9 November 2016, but was retained on the club's 2017 list to help with medical costs for concussion treatment.
1	14	Oliver Hanrahan	Hawthorn	St Kevin's College	APS	
1	15	Tendai Mzungu	Greater Western Sydney	Fremantle	AFL	
1	16	Jack Henry	Geelong	Geelong Falcons	TAC Cup	
1	17	Ben Ronke	Sydney	Calder Cannons	TAC Cup	
1	18	Nathan Mullenger-McHugh	Western Bulldogs	Eastern Ranges	TAC Cup	
2	19	Shaun McKernan	Essendon	Essendon	AFL	
2	20	Mitch Hinge	Brisbane Lions	Glenelg	SANFL	
2	21	Luke Strnadica	Fremantle	East Fremantle	WAFL	
2	22	Cameron Loersch	Gold Coast	Gold Coast	AFL	
2	23	Alex Silvagni	Carlton	Fremantle	AFL	
2	24	Henry Schade	Collingwood	Gold Coast	AFL	
2	25	Tim Smith	Melbourne	Casey	VFL	
2	26	Brett Eddy	Port Adelaide	South Adelaide	SANFL	
2	27	Passed	St Kilda			
2	28	Oscar Junker	North Melbourne	Western Jets	TAC Cup	
2	29	Drew Petrie	West Coast	North Melbourne	AFL	
2	30	Passed	Adelaide			
2	31	Jack Fitzpatrick	Hawthorn	Hawthorn	AFL	
2	32	Joel Patfull	Greater Western Sydney	Greater Western Sydney	AFL	Patfull retired on 12 October 2016, but was retained on GWS's 2017 list due to Total Player Payment obligations.
2	33	Zach Guthrie	Geelong	Calder Cannons	TAC Cup	
2	34	Robbie Fox	Sydney	Coburg	VFL	
2	35	Josh Prudden	Western Bulldogs	Western Bulldogs	AFL	
3	36	Yestin Eades	Essendon	Essendon	AFL	
3	37	Oscar McInerney	Brisbane Lions	Casey	VFL	
3	38	Brady Grey	Fremantle	Fremantle	AFL	
3	39	Andrew Gallucci	Carlton	Carlton	AFL	
3	40	Liam Mackie	Collingwood	Glenelg	SANFL	
3	41	Declan Keilty	Melbourne	Casey	VFL	
3	42	Jarrod Lienert	Port Adelaide	Sturt	SANFL	
3	43	Matthew Taylor	North Melbourne	Perth	WAFL	
3	44	Fraser McInnes	West Coast	West Coast	AFL	
3	45	Ben Jarman	Adelaide	North Adelaide	SANFL	Father–son rule selection (son of Darren Jarman)
3	46	James Cousins	Hawthorn	Murray Bushrangers	TAC Cup	
3	47	Passed	Greater Western Sydney			
3	48	Jamaine Jones	Geelong	North Ballarat Rebels	TAC Cup	
3	49	Shaun Edwards	Sydney	Essendon	AFL	
4	50	Josh Deluca	Fremantle	Fremantle	AFL	
4	51	Max Lynch	Collingwood	Murray Bushrangers	TAC Cup	
4	52	Passed	Greater Western Sydney			
4	53	Sam Simpson	Geelong	Geelong Falcons	TAC Cup	Father–son rule selection (son of Sean Simpson)
4	54	Toby Pink	Sydney	Glenelg	SANFL	
5	55	Passed	Sydney			

=== Category B rookie selections ===
During the trade period, clubs could nominate category B rookies to join their club.

Player	Club	Origin	Note	Ref.
Matt Eagles	Brisbane Lions	North Ballarat	Winner of The Recruit	
Blake Grewar	Brisbane Lions	Redland	Queensland zone selection	
Ciarán Sheehan	Carlton	Cork GAA, Carlton	International selection (Ireland)	
Ben McNiece	Essendon	Essendon (VFL)	Next Generation Academy zone selection (mother born in India)	
Mark O'Connor	Geelong	Kerry GAA	International selection (Ireland)	
Max Spencer	Gold Coast	Palm Beach Currumbin	Queensland zone selection	
Jake Stein	Greater Western Sydney	Athletics	3-year non-registered player (athletics)	
Zach Sproule	Greater Western Sydney	Murray Bushrangers	NSW zone selection	
Conor Nash	Hawthorn	Meath GAA	International selection (Ireland)	
Corey Maynard	Melbourne	Townsville Crocodiles (NBL)	3-year non-registered player (basketball)	
Emmanuel Irra	Port Adelaide	South Adelaide	Next Generation Academy zone selection (born in Uganda)	
Ray Connellan	St Kilda	Westmeath GAA	International selection (Ireland)	
Darragh Joyce	St Kilda	Kilkenny GAA	International selection (Ireland)	
Sam Fisher	Sydney	Canberra	NSW zone selection	
Tarir Bayok	West Coast	East Perth	Next Generation Academy zone selection (born in Sudan)	
Francis Watson	West Coast	Claremont	Next Generation Academy zone selection (Indigenous)	
Tristan Tweedie	Western Bulldogs	Eastern Ranges	Next Generation Academy zone selection (Indigenous)	

== See also ==
- 2016 AFL Women's draft
