= Alex Witherden =

Australian rules footballer

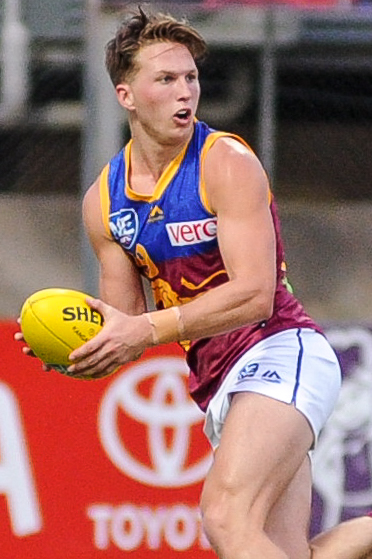
- Witherden playing for the Brisbane Lions reserves in April 2017

Personal information
- Full name: Alex Witherden
- Born: 10 September 1998 (age 28)
- Original team: Geelong Falcons (TAC Cup)/St Joseph’s
- Draft: No. 23, 2016 national draft
- Debut: Round 14, 2017, Brisbane Lions vs. Greater Western Sydney, at the Gabba
- Height: 188 cm (6 ft 2 in)
- Weight: 80 kg (176 lb)
- Position: Half-back flank

Playing career
Years	Club	Games (Goals)
2017–2020	Brisbane Lions	59 (5)
2021–2024	West Coast	62 (3)
Total		121 (8)

Career highlights
- 2× AFL Rising Star nominee: 2017, 2018; 22under22 team: 2018

Alex Witherden (born 10 September 1998) is a former professional Australian rules footballer who played for the Brisbane Lions and the West Coast Eagles in the Australian Football League (AFL).

== Early life ==
Witherden was a successful junior athlete in basketball and cricket but his biggest aspiration was to play in the AFL. He loved football so much that his mother forged his age in order to go to Auskick a year early. He regularly played football above his age group as a junior for Barwon Heads in the Bellarine Football League, mainly playing as a midfielder.

In 2009 as a 10 year old he played under-12s and under-14s for Barwon Heads then he just played under-14s in 2010. In 2011 he moved to St Joseph's Football & Netball Club where he played two seasons of under-14s. Alex moved up to under-16s for 2013 and in 2014 he was named in the Vic Country team for the Under-16 National Championships. Witherden had arthroscopes on both hips at the end of the 2014 season.

2015 was when Witherden made his debut for the Geelong Falcons in the TAC Cup as a bottom age player, he played 12 games and kicked 5 goals. He also played in the AFL Academy game on AFL Grand Final day, drawing strong praise from coach Brenton Sanderson.

Witherden's draft year started off strongly in 2016, he was named the captain of the Geelong College 1st XVIII football team after an impressive season in 2015. Witherden played two Academy games and two Falcons games where he averaged 23 disposals and five marks per game in the TAC Cup, playing mostly as a skilful defender. Playing for Geelong College in early May, Witherden was sick before the game so he was playing forward. Geelong College was losing by about 90 points when Witherden decided to put himself into the midfield for a centre bounce. He broke his leg in a tackle from fellow AFL prospect Tim Taranto who was playing for St Kevin's. Witherden's leg was in an awkward position when Taranto came down on it with his full body weight, Alex was in severe pain and had to be stretchered off the ground. He broke one of the bones in his right leg in four places, cracked another one and tore the syndesmotic ligaments which connect them. The injury meant Witherden would finish the most important year of junior football having played just two games of TAC Cup. He missed the Under-18 National Championships, the Under-18 All Stars match and was in doubt for the National Draft Combine, to which he was invited.

Witherden focused on his rehab, he rode an electric scooter around school as it was the best way to keep weight off his leg, he also hit the Geelong Falcons gym after dropping down to 75 kg during his injury, his weight improved to 80 kg and improved his diet, cutting down on his favourite McDonald's frozen Coke plus ate less bread. Where at one time he would have three or four sandwiches in his lunchbox, he then would opt for a chicken salad. He took advice during the setback from fellow draftee and friend Jy Simpkin, who broke his right leg a month earlier and Carlton player Darcy Lang who suffered a similar injury.

== AFL career ==
He was drafted by Brisbane with pick 23 in the 2016 national draft. He made his debut in the loss to Greater Western Sydney at the Gabba in round 14 of the 2017 season. After the thirty-one point loss to Richmond at Etihad Stadium in round 17, in which he recorded twenty-eight disposals and four tackles, he was the round nominee for the 2017 AFL Rising Star. In 2018 Witherden became the 11th player to receive a second AFL Rising Star nomination after a match against Hawthorn.

After a difficult 2020 season in which he struggled to break into Brisbane's best 22, Witherden was traded to West Coast on a two-year deal.

Witherden played 62 games for West Coast across four seasons, before being delisted at the end of the 2024 season.

== Statistics ==
Legend
G	Goals	K	Kicks	D	Disposals	T	Tackles
B	Behinds	H	Handballs	M	Marks

Season	Team	No.	Games	Totals							Averages (per game)							Votes
Season	Team	No.	Games	G	B	K	H	D	M	T	G	B	K	H	D	M	T	Votes
2017	Brisbane Lions	29	9	2	0	143	69	212	48	23	0.2	0.0	15.9	7.7	23.6	5.3	2.6	0
2018	Brisbane Lions	29	21	1	3	336	135	471	152	34	0.0	0.1	16.0	6.4	22.4	7.2	1.6	1
2019	Brisbane Lions	29	23	2	3	332	89	421	127	38	0.1	0.1	14.4	3.9	18.3	5.5	1.7	0
2020 (Note: The 2020 season was played with 17 home-and-away matches per team (down from 22) and 16-minute quarters with time on (down from 20-minute quarters with time on) due to the impact of the COVID-19 pandemic.)	Brisbane Lions	29	6	0	0	92	23	115	39	7	0.0	0.0	15.3	3.8	19.2	6.5	1.2	2
2021	West Coast	23	9	1	0	166	34	200	59	18	0.1	0.0	18.4	3.8	22.2	6.6	2.0	0
2022	West Coast	23	13	0	0	207	72	279	100	26	0.0	0.0	15.9	5.5	21.5	7.7	2.0	0
2023	West Coast	23	22	1	0	304	140	444	117	50	0.0	0.0	13.8	6.4	20.2	5.3	2.3	0
2024	West Coast	23	18	1	0	196	112	308	74	33	0.1	0.0	10.9	6.2	17.1	4.1	1.8	0
Career			121	8	6	1776	674	2450	716	229	0.1	0.0	14.7	5.6	20.2	5.9	1.9	3
