= David Cuningham =

Australian rules footballer

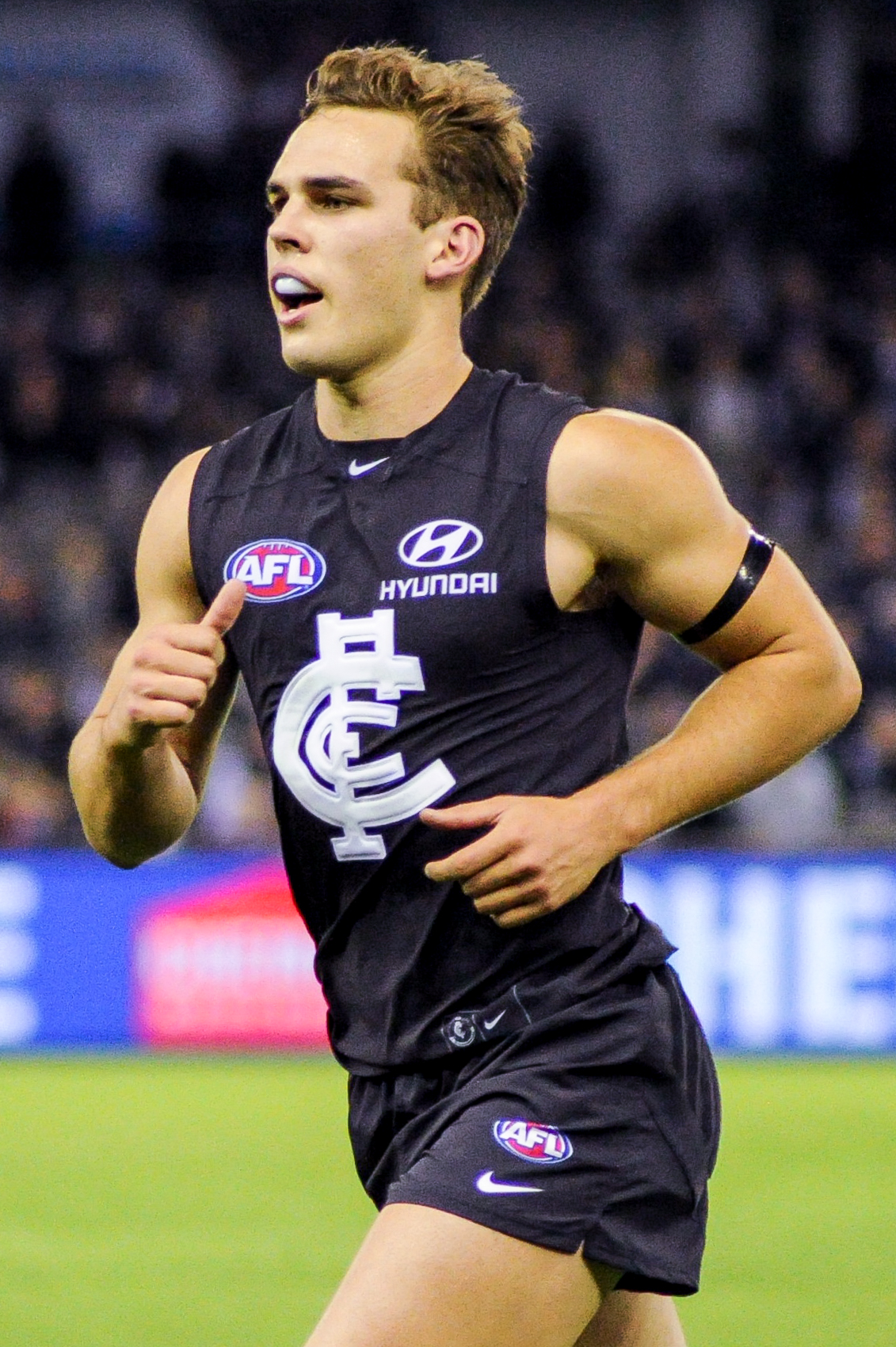
- Cuningham playing for Carlton in June 2017

Personal information
- Full name: David Cuningham
- Nickname: Cunners
- Born: 30 March 1997 (age 29)
- Original team: Oakleigh Chargers (TAC Cup)/Melbourne Grammar (APS)
- Draft: No. 23, 2015 national draft
- Debut: Round 21, 2016, Carlton vs. Brisbane Lions, at the Gabba
- Height: 188 cm (6 ft 2 in)
- Weight: 89 kg (196 lb)
- Position: Midfielder / half-forward

Playing career
| Years | Club | Games (Goals) |
| 2016–2024 | Carlton | 58 (30) |

Career highlights
- AFL Rising Star nominee: 2017

David Cuningham (born 30 March 1997) is a former Australian rules footballer who played for the Carlton Football Club in the Australian Football League (AFL).

== Early career ==
Cuningham grew up in Melbourne's eastern suburbs, he played junior football for Canterbury Cobras and Boroondara Hawks in the Yarra Junior Football League. He was educated at Melbourne Grammar School. He was drafted by the Carlton Football Club with their fourth selection and twenty-third overall in the 2015 national draft.

== AFL career ==
He made his debut in Round 21, 2016 against Brisbane Lions at the Gabba.

Cuningham received the AFL Rising Star nomination in round 12 of the 2017 AFL season kicking 2 goals in Carlton's one-point win over Greater Western Sydney. At the end of 2017 he signed a two-year contract extension. During 2019, he signed another contract extension to the end of 2022.

His opportunities at senior level were hampered by injury throughout this career, troubled by his hip in 2016, his knee in 2018 and 2019, his calf in 2020, and an anterior cruciate ligament rupture in 2021.

Cuningham was delisted at the end of the 2024 season.

== Statistics ==
Legend
| G | Goals | K | Kicks | D | Disposals | T | Tackles |
| B | Behinds | H | Handballs | M | Marks |

| Season | Team | No. | Games | Totals | | | | | | | Averages (per game) | | | | | | | Votes |
| Season | Team | No. | Games | G | B | K | H | D | M | T | G | B | K | H | D | M | T | Votes |
|---|---|---|---|---|---|---|---|---|---|---|---|---|---|---|---|---|---|---|
| 2016 | Carlton | 28 | 3 | 0 | 0 | 14 | 17 | 31 | 8 | 16 | 0.0 | 0.0 | 4.7 | 5.7 | 10.3 | 2.7 | 5.3 | 0 |
| 2017 | Carlton | 28 | 8 | 6 | 1 | 63 | 40 | 103 | 27 | 34 | 0.8 | 0.1 | 7.9 | 5.0 | 12.9 | 3.4 | 4.3 | 0 |
| 2018 | Carlton | 28 | 5 | 1 | 0 | 24 | 37 | 61 | 12 | 8 | 0.2 | 0.0 | 4.8 | 7.4 | 12.2 | 2.4 | 1.6 | 0 |
| 2019 | Carlton | 28 | 9 | 7 | 5 | 65 | 79 | 144 | 28 | 32 | 0.8 | 0.6 | 7.2 | 8.8 | 16.0 | 3.1 | 3.6 | 0 |
| 2020 (Note: The 2020 season was played with 17 home-and-away matches per team (down from 22) and 16-minute quarters with time on (down from 20-minute quarters with time on) due to the impact of the COVID-19 pandemic.) | Carlton | 28 | 12 | 6 | 6 | 72 | 66 | 138 | 32 | 32 | 0.5 | 0.5 | 6.0 | 5.5 | 11.5 | 2.7 | 2.7 | 3 |
| 2021 | Carlton | 28 | 4 | 3 | 2 | 26 | 28 | 54 | 9 | 6 | 0.8 | 0.5 | 6.5 | 7.0 | 13.5 | 2.3 | 1.5 | 0 |
| 2022 | Carlton | 28 | 0 | — | — | — | — | — | — | — | — | — | — | — | — | — | — | 0 |
| 2023 | Carlton | 28 | 12 | 6 | 4 | 64 | 102 | 166 | 26 | 45 | 0.5 | 0.3 | 5.3 | 8.5 | 13.8 | 2.2 | 3.8 | 0 |
| 2024 | Carlton | 28 | 5 | 1 | 2 | 18 | 21 | 39 | 7 | 10 | 0.2 | 0.4 | 3.6 | 4.2 | 7.8 | 1.4 | 2.0 | 0 |
| Career | | | 58 | 30 | 20 | 346 | 390 | 736 | 149 | 183 | 0.5 | 0.3 | 6.0 | 6.7 | 12.7 | 2.6 | 3.2 | 3 |
