= Quinton Narkle =

Australian rules footballer (born 1997)

Personal information
- Born: 3 December 1997 (age 28)
- Original team: Wesley College (PSA)/Perth(WAFL)
- Draft: Pick 60, 2016 national draft
- Debut: June 29, 2018, Geelong vs. Western Bulldogs, at Docklands Stadium
- Height: 182 cm (6 ft 0 in)
- Weight: 83 kg (183 lb)
- Position: Midfielder

Playing career
Years	Club	Games (Goals)
2017–2022	Geelong	41 (18)
2023–2024	Port Adelaide	16 (8)
2025	Fremantle	2 (1)
Total		59 (27)

Quinton Narkle (born 3 December 1997) is a former Australian rules footballer who played for the Geelong, Port Adelaide, and Fremantle Football Clubs in the Australian Football League (AFL).

== Football career ==
Narkle, from Western Australia, attended Wesley College and originally played for the colts team of West Australian Football League club Perth Demons. He played for his state at the AFL Under 18 Championships, averaging 16 disposals. Narkle was drafted by Geelong with pick 60 in the 2016 national draft. In June 2017, he ruptured his anterior cruciate ligament while training and did not return until May 2018. Narkle played six Victorian Football League matches before his debut. He made his AFL debut for Geelong in round 15 of the 2018 season against the Western Bulldogs at Docklands Stadium. Commenting on Narkle's debut performance, coach Chris Scott said "we thought he was outstanding".

Narkle was delisted by Geelong at the end of the 2022 season. After training with Richmond over the summer, he was overlooked for their last list spot and joined Essendon's VFL team. He was then redrafted by Port Adelaide in the 2023 AFL mid-season draft at pick 11.

After playing three games for Port during the remainder of the 2023 season, and 13 games in 2024, Narkle was again delisted at the end of the 2024 season. He was then selected by Fremantle after the 2024 draft in the Pre-season Supplemental Selection Period.

Narkle played his first match for Fremantle in Round 7 of the 2025 AFL season, during the Dockers annual Len Hall Tribute game against Adelaide at Optus Stadium.

On 19 August 2025, it was confirmed that Narkle has announced his retirement effective immediately where he would plan to relocate to Darwin, Northern Territory with his young family.

== Personal life ==
Narkle is an Indigenous Australian, distantly related to former Swan Districts, West Coast Eagles and St Kilda footballer Phil Narkle. Narkle is also second cousin with former teammate, Sam Powell-Pepper.

== Statistics ==
Legend
G	Goals	K	Kicks	D	Disposals	T	Tackles
B	Behinds	H	Handballs	M	Marks

Season	Team	No.	Games	Totals							Averages (per game)							Votes
Season	Team	No.	Games	G	B	K	H	D	M	T	G	B	K	H	D	M	T	Votes
2017	Geelong	19	0	—	—	—	—	—	—	—	—	—	—	—	—	—	—	0
2018	Geelong	19	6	5	2	31	42	73	13	14	0.8	0.3	5.2	7.0	12.2	2.2	2.3	0
2019	Geelong	19	6	5	4	59	44	103	14	18	0.8	0.7	9.8	7.3	17.2	2.3	3.0	0
2020 (Note: The 2020 season was played with 17 home-and-away matches per team (down from 22) and 16-minute quarters with time on (down from 20-minute quarters with time on) due to the impact of the COVID-19 pandemic.)	Geelong	19	5	0	1	27	30	57	9	18	0.0	0.2	5.4	6.0	11.4	1.8	3.6	0
2021	Geelong	19	16	4	4	86	129	215	37	25	0.3	0.3	5.4	8.1	13.4	2.3	1.6	2
2022	Geelong	19	8	4	3	40	28	68	21	8	0.5	0.4	5.0	3.5	8.5	2.6	1.0	0
2023	Port Adelaide	47	3	4	1	18	14	32	7	4	1.3	0.3	6.0	4.7	10.7	2.3	1.3	0
2024	Port Adelaide	42	13	4	10	74	20	94	41	14	0.3	0.8	5.7	1.5	7.2	3.2	1.1	0
2025	Fremantle	19	2	1	1	6	4	10	2	2	0.5	0.5	3.0	2.0	5.0	1.0	1.0	0
Career			59	27	26	341	311	652	144	103	0.5	0.4	5.8	5.3	11.1	2.4	1.7	2
