= Ryan Burton =

Australian rules footballer (born 1997)

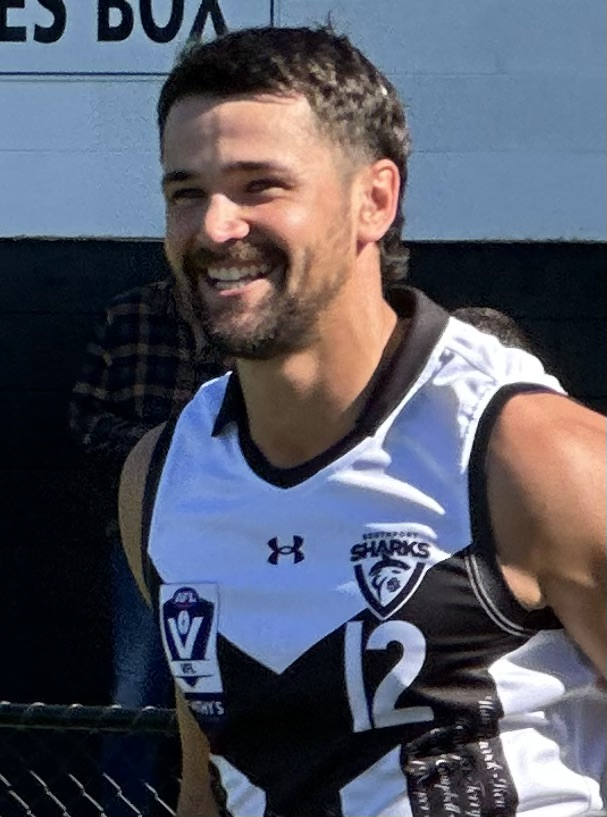
- Burton playing for Southport in 2026

Personal information
- Born: 31 January 1997 (age 29)
- Original team: North Adelaide(SANFL)/PHOS Camden
- Draft: No. 19, 2015 national draft
- Debut: Round 21, 2016, Hawthorn vs. North Melbourne, at Melbourne Cricket Ground
- Height: 191 cm (6 ft 3 in)
- Weight: 90 kg (198 lb)
- Position: Defender

Playing career
Years	Club	Games (Goals)
2016–2018	Hawthorn	47 (5)
2019–2025	Port Adelaide	115 (20)
Total		162 (25)

Career highlights
- 22under22 team: 2017

Ryan Donald Burton (born 31 January 1997) is a former Australian rules footballer who is currently a development coach at the Greater Western Sydney Giants. He previously played professionally for Hawthorn and Port Adelaide in the Australian Football League (AFL).

== Early life ==
Ryan Burton was raised in Adelaide, and attended Sacred Heart. He participated in the Auskick program at his primary school. He later played his junior football at PHOS Camden and Sacred Heart. In 2014, he played four games for North Adelaide in the SANFL, all at the age of 17. He was still young enough to play in the 2014 NAB AFL Under-18 Championships. He kicked five goals in a game for South Australia against Western Australia.

Late 2014 Burton broke his leg while playing football in an interschool match. He required surgery for the injury, resulting in orthopedic surgeon Matthew Liptak, a former Adelaide Crows player, inserting a metal plate and 10 screws into his leg. Burton spent 2015 in rehabilitation. Before he broke his leg, Burton was the state's hottest 2015 draft prospect.

== AFL career ==
=== Hawthorn (2016–2018) ===
He was drafted by the Hawthorn Football Club with their first selection and nineteenth overall in the 2015 national draft. He played two games early for Box Hill in the Victorian Football League (VFL) before having an operation to remove the screws and plate in his leg. He came back to play two more Games for Box Hill before getting a call up to play for Hawthorn.

He made his debut in round 21, 2016. He kicked a goal with his very first kick. Burton played four games in a row but he suffered a calf injury during the 2016 Qualifying Final versus the Geelong Cats, and his season ended there.

Entering into his second season, Burton changed from number 35 to the number 5 guernsey following Sam Mitchell’s move to West Coast at the end of the 2016 season. He earned a Rising Star nomination in round 2, 2017, in a 24 point loss to Adelaide at the MCG, with 26 possessions, nine marks and four tackles. On 17 July 2017 it was announced that Burton had signed a three-year contract extension to stay at Hawthorn until the end of 2020.

At the conclusion of the 2018 season and start of the trade period, it emerged that Hawthorn were seeking to trade Burton to Port Adelaide in order to facilitate the arrival of Chad Wingard. Burton, who was overseas on holiday at the time, was reportedly unhappy with how Hawthorn was treating the trade with him and especially the circumstances with him being a contracted player. Nonetheless, Burton saw the opportunity to return home to South Australia and play for his boyhood club. Burton was officially traded to the Port Adelaide on 17 October.

=== Port Adelaide (2019–2025) ===
Burton played 115 AFL matches for Port Adelaide over 7 seasons, before being delisted by the club at the conclusion of the 2025 season. In October 2025, it was reported that Burton could possibly join a third club, and that his manager was in talks with Carlton.

== Post-playing career ==
In 2026, Burton played for the Southport Sharks in the VFL, playing seven matches for the season. In October, he joined the Greater Western Sydney Giants as a development coach.

== Family ==
Burton is the son of dual North Adelaide premiership player Craig Burton. This enabled him to transfer from Glenelg to North Adelaide under the SANFL father son rule.

Burton is in a relationship with Brie Abernathy, who is the daughter of former Port Adelaide footballer Bruce Abernathy.

== Statistics ==
Legend
G	Goals	K	Kicks	D	Disposals	T	Tackles
B	Behinds	H	Handballs	M	Marks

Season	Team	No.	Games	Totals							Averages (per game)							Votes
Season	Team	No.	Games	G	B	K	H	D	M	T	G	B	K	H	D	M	T	Votes
2016	Hawthorn	35	4	1	2	30	11	41	15	7	0.3	0.5	7.5	2.8	10.3	3.8	1.8	0
2017	Hawthorn	5	20	4	1	268	158	426	114	58	0.2	0.1	13.4	7.9	21.3	5.7	2.9	2
2018	Hawthorn	5	23	0	5	245	144	389	100	39	0.0	0.2	10.7	6.3	16.9	4.3	1.7	0
2019	Port Adelaide	3	16	4	4	220	95	315	61	33	0.3	0.3	13.8	5.9	19.7	3.8	2.1	0
2020 (Note: The 2020 season was played with 17 home-and-away matches per team (down from 22) and 16-minute quarters with time on (down from 20-minute quarters with time on) due to the impact of the COVID-19 pandemic.)	Port Adelaide	3	8	0	1	74	27	101	30	8	0.0	0.1	9.3	3.4	12.6	3.8	1.0	0
2021	Port Adelaide	3	24	0	1	320	113	433	133	61	0.0	0.0	13.3	4.7	18.0	5.5	2.5	0
2022	Port Adelaide	3	22	4	4	348	99	447	115	43	0.2	0.2	15.8	4.5	20.3	5.2	2.0	0
2023	Port Adelaide	3	22	8	6	278	58	336	80	46	0.4	0.3	12.6	2.6	15.3	3.6	2.1	0
2024	Port Adelaide	3	15	3	4	207	61	268	66	23	0.2	0.3	13.8	4.1	17.9	4.4	1.5	0
2025	Port Adelaide	3	8	1	2	109	45	154	37	9	0.1	0.3	13.6	5.6	19.3	4.6	1.1	0
Career			162	25	30	2099	811	2910	751	327	0.2	0.2	13.0	5.0	18.0	4.6	2.0	2

== Honours and achievements ==
Team

- Minor premiership (Port Adelaide): 2020

Individual

- 22under22 team: 2017
- AFL Rising Star nominee: 2017

== See also ==
- List of first kick/first goal kickers in the Australian Football League
