= Steele Sidebottom =

Australian rules footballer

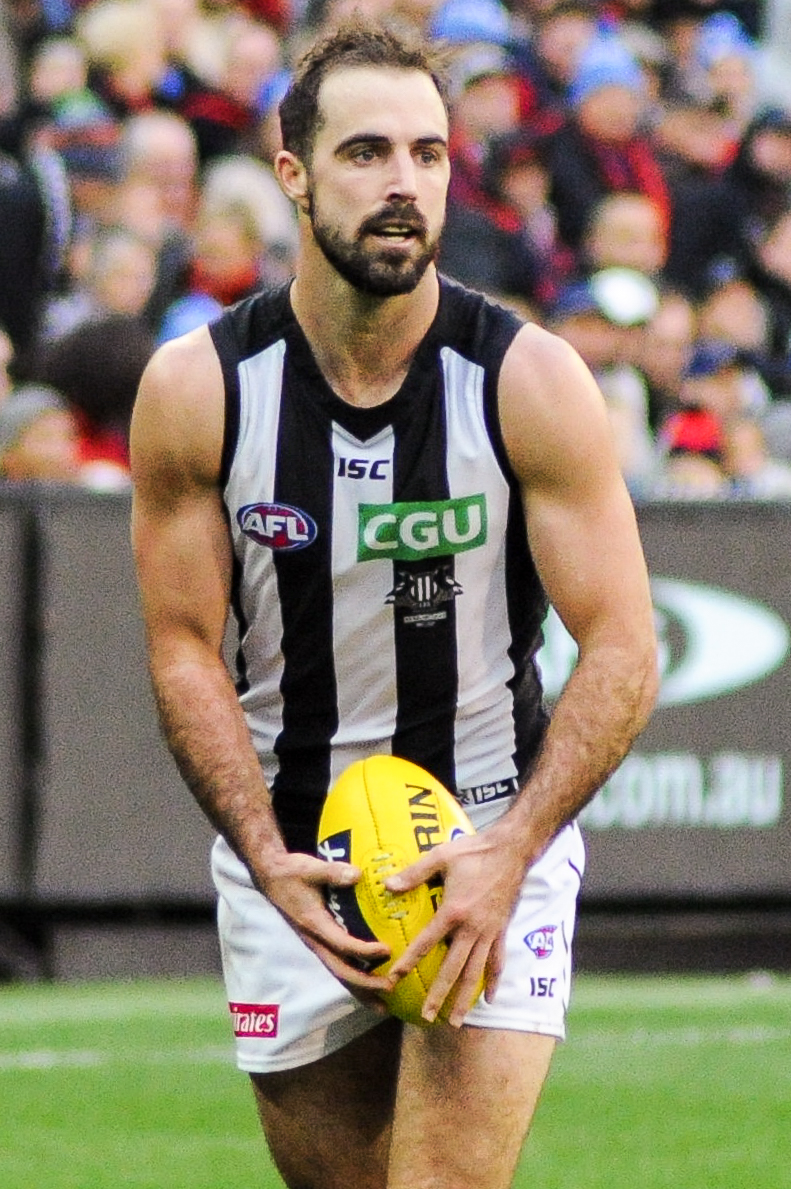
- Sidebottom playing for Collingwood in June 2017

Personal information
- Full name: Steele Robert Sidebottom
- Nicknames: Rusty, Steelo, BlueScope
- Born: 2 January 1991 (age 35); Tallygaroopna, Victoria
- Original teams: Congupna Football Club (Murray Football League); Murray Bushrangers (TAC Cup)
- Draft: No. 11, 2008 National Draft, Collingwood
- Height: 184 cm (6 ft 0 in)
- Weight: 86 kg (190 lb)
- Position: Midfielder

Playing career^{1}
Years	Club	Games (Goals)
2009–2026	Collingwood	375 (213)

Representative team honours
Years	Team	Games (Goals)
2020	Victoria	1 (0)
- ^{1} Playing statistics correct to the end of the 2026 season.

Career highlights
- 2× AFL premiership player: 2010, 2023; All-Australian team: 2018; 2× Copeland Trophy: 2017, 2018; Collingwood co-vice captain: 2015–2022; Gary Ayres Award: 2018; 2× Anzac Day Medal: 2016, 2025; 2× 22under22 team: 2012, 2013

Steele Robert Sidebottom (born 2 January 1991) is a former professional Australian rules football player who played for the Collingwood Football Club in the Australian Football League.

He made the All-Australian team in 2018 and is a two-time Copeland Trophy winner as Collingwood best and fairest.

Recruited from Congupna Football Club and the Murray Bushrangers, Sidebottom was selected by Collingwood with selection 11 in the 2008 AFL draft. As a bottom-ager, Sidebottom dominated the 2008 TAC Cup Grand Final earlier in the year with a 10 goal, 32 disposal best-on-ground performance. He was touted as a midfielder who was prolific in overhead marking as well as one-on-one contests. An AIS/AFL Academy graduate and Vic Country representative in 2008, Sidebottom also was selected in the All-Australian team following the 2008 AFL Under 18 Championships.

A mid/forward in youth, Sidebottom became a star as a pure inside/outside midfielder for Collingwood. He won the Copeland Trophy twice as the club's best and fairest in 2017 and 2018 as well as playing in the team's premierships in 2010 and 2023. Sidebottom was selected in the 2018 All-Australian team, the same year he finished second in the Brownlow Medal. He was the co-vice captain of Collingwood from 2015 until 2022. After retiring at the conclusion of the 2026 season, Sidebottom's games tally sits at 375, second all time for Collingwood, only behind Scott Pendlebury's 442, whom of which he played an AFL/VFL record 340 games alongside. This surpassed the tally of 307 set by Adelaide teammates Andrew McLeod and Tyson Edwards. They also played in 194 wins together, a figure only surpassed by Geelong pair Joel Selwood and Tom Hawkins' 217.

== Career ==
Sidebottom made his AFL debut vs St Kilda in Round 7, 2009, in which, Collingwood was defeated by St Kilda by 88 points. After facing losses in his first two AFL games, Sidebottom lost just 29 of his next 117 games.

In the 2009 semi-final against the Adelaide Crows, Collingwood had an impressive come-from-behind win after Adelaide led by 32 points in the 2nd quarter. This was Sidebottom's first real breakout performance, in which he notched up 25 disposals, 10 tackles and 6 inside 50s, playing an important role in the second half turn-around.

In 2010, Sidebottom played in all but one game for the Magpies, including both the drawn Grand Final and Grand Final replay. At 19 years and 273 days of age, he was the youngest member of Collingwood's 2010 Premiership-winning side.

On 6 October 2017, Sidebottom won his first Copeland Trophy as Collingwood best and fairest with 140 votes, one vote ahead of Taylor Adams.

In a season in which he claimed his first All-Australian blazer, Sidebottom finished in second place at the 2018 Brownlow Medal count with 24 votes, 4 less than winner and eventual teammate Tom Mitchell, both a career best placing and vote tally. He also won his second consecutive best and fairest, tying with Brodie Grundy on 203 votes.

In 2020, Sidebottom was handed a four match suspension for breaching the AFL's COVID-19 protocols, after he and teammate Lynden Dunn had shared an Uber together and visited several homes, with the night concluding in Sidebottom being driven home by police.

In 2023, Sidebottom played his 300th AFL game in round 11, a 105-70 win against North Melbourne, becoming just the fourth Collingwood player to reach the milestone. His match was cut short, as he injured his MCL in the first quarter and did not return to play until Round 18. After playing 8/9 games en route to that year's Grand Final, Sidebottom kicked a 55-metre bomb in the last quarter which ultimately sealed Collingwood's premiership victory. Alongside this goal, he finished the day with 20 disposals, 7 tackles and 7 score involvements.

On 13 August 2026, Sidebottom announced that he would retire at the end of the 2026 AFL season. His 375th and final game would be the first ever wildcard final match, in which Collingwood would lose by 3 points to the Western Bulldogs. Sidebottom finished the night with 8 disposals and 5 marks in 73% time on ground.

== Personal life ==
Sidebottom married long-time partner Alisha (née Edwards) in 2022, he credits Alisha for helping him transition from a "part-timer" to a truly professional athlete. They have three kids together - daughter Matilda (born 2020), as well as sons Ned (born 2024) and Beau (born 2025).

== Statistics ==
Legend
G	Goals	K	Kicks	D	Disposals	T	Tackles
B	Behinds	H	Handballs	M	Marks
#	Played in that season's premiership team

Season	Team	No.	Games	Totals							Averages (per game)							Votes
Season	Team	No.	Games	G	B	K	H	D	M	T	G	B	K	H	D	M	T	Votes
2009	Collingwood	22	11	3	3	82	85	167	42	44	0.3	0.3	7.5	7.7	15.2	3.8	4.0	0
2010^{#}	Collingwood	22	25	24	13	253	209	462	105	101	1.0	0.5	10.1	8.4	18.5	4.2	4.0	1
2011	Collingwood	22	25	25	13	275	214	489	128	107	1.0	0.5	11.0	8.6	19.6	5.1	4.3	4
2012	Collingwood	22	24	14	13	377	258	635	133	89	0.6	0.5	15.7	10.8	26.5	5.5	3.7	7
2013	Collingwood	22	23	19	10	361	194	555	120	77	0.8	0.4	15.7	8.4	24.1	5.2	3.3	7
2014	Collingwood	22	19	14	14	327	181	508	109	78	0.7	0.7	17.2	9.5	26.7	5.7	4.1	9
2015	Collingwood	22	16	7	8	251	186	437	85	53	0.4	0.5	15.7	11.6	27.3	5.3	3.3	9
2016	Collingwood	22	20	17	7	273	241	514	108	90	0.9	0.4	13.7	12.1	25.7	5.4	4.5	7
2017	Collingwood	22	22	16	9	344	256	600	115	93	0.7	0.4	15.6	11.6	27.3	5.2	4.2	14
2018	Collingwood	22	26	12	14	361	403	764	133	96	0.5	0.5	13.9	15.5	29.4	5.1	3.7	24
2019	Collingwood	22	23	10	7	339	253	592	141	84	0.4	0.3	14.7	11.0	25.7	6.1	3.7	7
2020 (Note: The 2020 season was played with 17 home-and-away matches per team (down from 22) and 16-minute quarters with time on (down from 20-minute quarters with time on) due to the impact of the COVID-19 pandemic.)	Collingwood	22	9	5	3	112	101	213	33	38	0.6	0.3	12.4	11.2	23.7	3.7	4.2	6
2021	Collingwood	22	21	8	5	272	228	500	114	62	0.4	0.2	13.0	10.9	23.8	5.4	3.0	0
2022	Collingwood	22	25	12	7	274	175	449	110	74	0.5	0.3	11.0	7.0	18.0	4.4	3.0	3
2023^{#}	Collingwood	22	20	4	2	257	160	417	85	72	0.2	0.1	12.9	8.0	20.9	4.3	3.6	3
2024	Collingwood	22	22	4	8	270	133	403	90	69	0.2	0.4	12.3	6.0	18.3	4.1	3.1	0
2025	Collingwood	22	23	15	10	284	204	488	97	90	0.7	0.4	12.3	8.9	21.2	4.2	3.9	11
2026	Collingwood	22	19	4	2	167	146	313	80	38	0.2	0.1	8.8	7.7	16.5	4.2	2.0	0
Career			373	213	148	4879	3627	8506	1828	1355	0.6	0.4	13.1	9.7	22.8	4.9	3.6	112

== Honours and achievements ==
Collingwood

- 2× AFL Premiership (Collingwood): 2010, 2023
- McClelland Trophy (Collingwood): 2010, 2011
- AFL Minor Premiership (Collingwood) 2010, 2011 2023
- NAB Cup (Collingwood) 2011

Individual

- All-Australian team: 2018
- 2× Copeland Trophy: 2017, 2018
- Collingwood co-vice captain: 2015–
- Gary Ayres Award: 2018
- 2× Anzac Day Medal: 2016, 2025
- 2× 22under22 team: 2012, 2013
