= 2018 Brownlow Medal =

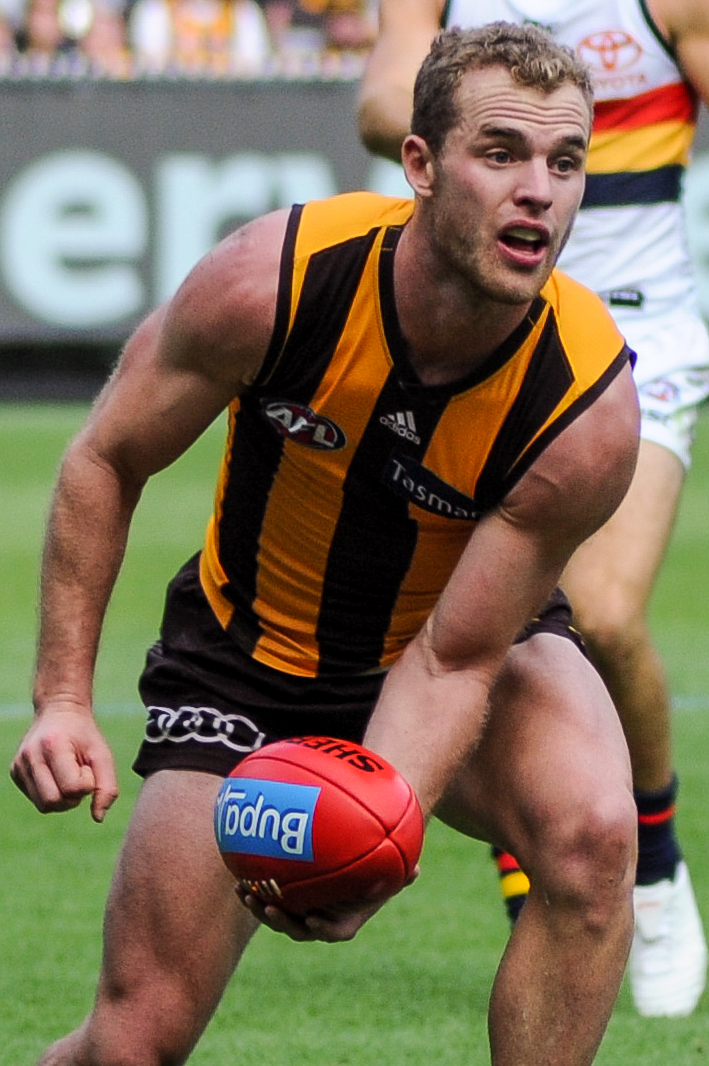
- 2018 Brownlow Medalist, Tom Mitchell
- Date: 24 September
- Location: Crown Palladium
- Hosted by: Bruce McAvaney
- Winner: Tom Mitchell (Hawthorn) (28 votes)

Television/radio coverage
- Network: Seven Network; Telstra

The 2018 Brownlow Medal was the 91st year the award was presented to the player adjudged the fairest and best player during the Australian Football League (AFL) home-and-away season. Tom Mitchell of the Hawthorn Football Club won the medal with 28 votes.

== Leading vote-getters ==
	Player	Votes
1st	Tom Mitchell (Hawthorn)	28
2nd	Steele Sidebottom (Collingwood)	24
3rd	Angus Brayshaw (Melbourne)	21
=4th	Patrick Cripps (Carlton)	20
=4th	Max Gawn (Melbourne)	20
=6th	Rory Laird (Adelaide)	19
=6th	Dustin Martin (Richmond)	19
=8th	Jack Steven (St Kilda)	18
=8th	Dayne Beams (Brisbane Lions)	18
=10th	Brodie Grundy (Collingwood)	17
=10th	Patrick Dangerfield (Geelong)	17

== Voting procedure ==
The three field umpires (those umpires who control the flow of the game, as opposed to goal or boundary umpires) confer after each match and award three votes, two votes, and one vote to the players they regard as the best, second-best and third-best in the match, respectively. The votes are kept secret until the awards night, and they are read and tallied on the evening.
