= Daniel Rich =

Australian rules footballer

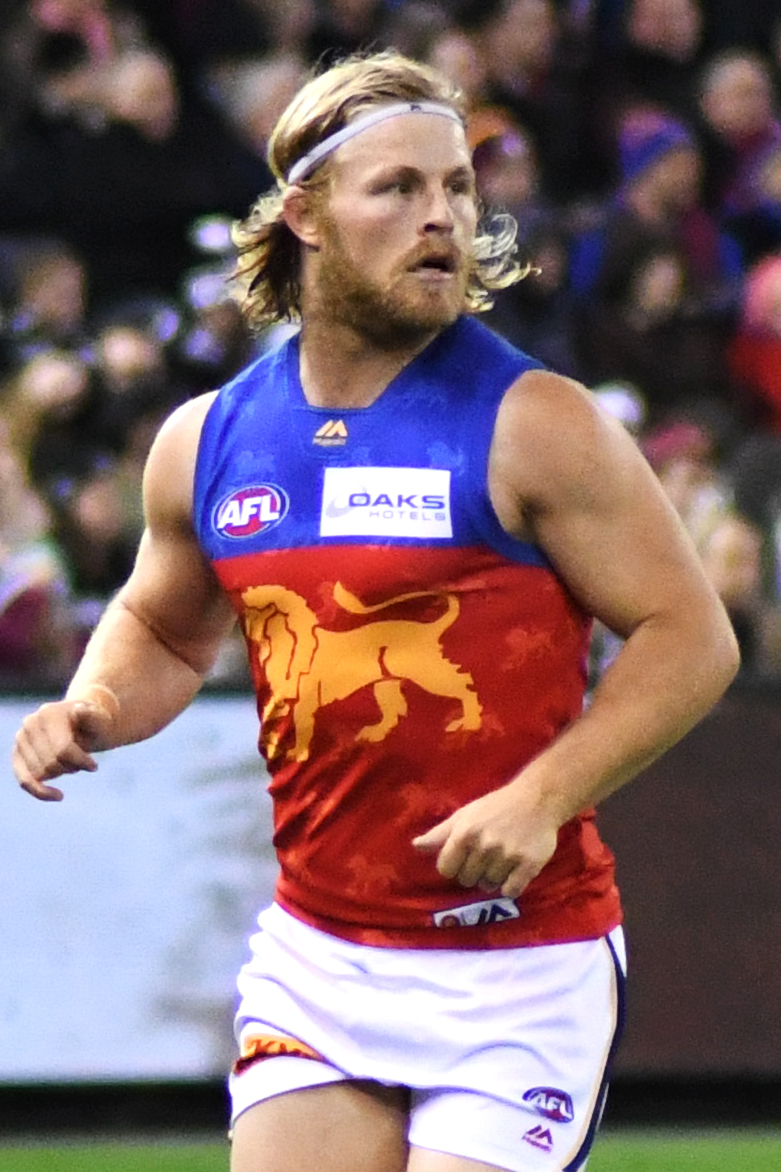
- Rich playing for Brisbane in August 2018

Personal information
- Full name: Daniel Gregory Rich
- Nicknames: Dan, Richy, Bam Bam
- Born: 7 June 1990 (age 36)
- Original team: Subiaco (WAFL)
- Draft: No. 7, 2008 national draft
- Height: 183 cm (6 ft 0 in)
- Weight: 95 kg (209 lb)
- Position: Defender

Club information
- Current club: Brisbane Lions
- Number: 10

Playing career^{1}
Years	Club	Games (Goals)
2009–2023	Brisbane Lions	275 (116)
- ^{1} Playing statistics correct to the end of the 2023 season.

Career highlights
- All-Australian: 2021; Ron Evans Medal: 2009; AFLPA Best First-Year Player: 2009; Michael Tuck Medal: 2013; Fox Footy Longest Kick winner: 2023; Signature

Daniel Gregory Rich (born 7 June 1990) is a former professional Australian rules footballer who played for the Brisbane Lions in the Australian Football League (AFL). He began his career in 2009, winning the Rising Star in his first year. After 275 AFL games and one All-Australian selection (in 2021), he retired in 2023. He now plays in the half Back line for Noosa Tigers in the QAFL for the 2025 season.

== Early life ==
Prior to being drafted by Brisbane, Rich had already amassed a considerable football résumé. This included under-18 selection for Western Australia in both 2007 and 2008, including selection for the All-Australian team both years, as well as playing in two senior premierships for Subiaco in the WAFL. Following strong performances at senior level, Rich was regarded by many observers as a potential top-two selection in the months leading up to the draft.

== AFL career ==
Rich made an impressive senior debut in Round 1, 2009, amassing 21 possessions and 4 tackles, a performance which garnered him the Rising Star nomination for Round 1. He was rewarded for an outstanding first-year season with the 2009 NAB Rising Star award, being only the second Rising Star winner to poll maximum votes from all 9 judges; he also created history by becoming the third consecutive player to be drafted at pick seven and win the award. The praise for Rich's debut season kept coming, this time coming from the players themselves, after winning the AFLPA award for Best First-Year Player by more than 400 votes.

Following a stellar first season, Rich added bulk to his frame over the 2010 pre-season and established himself as a key component of the Lions midfield in 2010. While he was consistently among the Lions top performers in the midfield, he particularly shone in the half-back line towards the tail end of the season in the Lions’ narrow loss to St Kilda in Round 15, against Melbourne in Round 18, and Essendon in Round 21. He led the Lions in inside-50s (93) and was second for tackles with 103, and had an impressive average of 19 disposals per game. He finished inside the top ten in the 2010 Merrett–Murray Medal, placing 8th with 24.5 votes.

Rich played his 100th AFL game against Geelong in Round 2, 2014, but he suffered a season-ending ACL injury in the loss to the Gold Coast Suns the following week.

Rich was selected for the 2021 All-Australian team in the half-back position. He was the only Lion to make the team in 2021.

In Round 13 of the 2023 season, after the Lions were shockingly upset by Hawthorn, fellow Lion Jack Gunston and Rich voluntarily stood themselves down from selection after being unhappy with their form.

On the 4th of September, 2023, Rich announced his retirement at the conclusion of the 2023 season, after a 275-game career.

Rich was not selected at AFL level again after he stood himself down after the Hawks game, meaning he was not a part of the Lions’s squad for the 2023 AFL Grand Final. This was the first time the club had made it to the grand final during Rich’s time at the club, which was seen by many in the wider AFL community as unfortunate timing due to Rich’s loyalty to the club during their time at the bottom of the ladder, but also reflective of his selfless and loyal attitude at the club. Prior to the aforementioned grand final, Rich won the 2023 edition of the Fox Footy Longest Kick, kicking a total distance of 69.5 metres (228 ft)—which is the second-longest kick in the competition's 8-year history—and winning $10,000.

Rich announced on the Kick Ons podcast, hosted by teammates Cameron Rayner and Hugh McCluggage, that he would remain at the Lions after his retirement, but he has yet to announce in what capacity that will be.

== Personal life ==
Rich was educated in Western Australia, attending secondary schooling at Sacred Heart College, Sorrento. He has two children, Xander and Indiana. He played junior football for Sorrento-Duncraig, part of the Subiaco junior district.

== Statistics ==
Legend
G	Goals	K	Kicks	D	Disposals	T	Tackles
B	Behinds	H	Handballs	M	Marks
†	Led the league for the season

Season	Team	No.	Games	Totals							Averages (per game)							Votes
Season	Team	No.	Games	G	B	K	H	D	M	T	G	B	K	H	D	M	T	Votes
2009	Brisbane Lions	10	24	14	17	245	170	415	71	106	0.6	0.7	10.2	7.1	17.3	3.0	4.4	6
2010	Brisbane Lions	10	22	6	14	237	189	426	61	103	0.3	0.6	10.8	8.6	19.4	2.8	4.7	2
2011	Brisbane Lions	10	16	14	12	198	109	307	42	76	0.9	0.8	12.4	6.8	19.2	2.6	4.8	0
2012	Brisbane Lions	10	20	20	13	269	165	434	73	65	1.0	0.7	13.5	8.3	21.7	3.7	3.3	8
2013	Brisbane Lions	10	16	13	9	166	130	296	27	45	0.8	0.6	10.4	8.1	18.5	1.7	2.8	5
2014	Brisbane Lions	10	3	0	1	24	23	47	11	8	0	0.3	8.0	7.7	15.7	3.7	2.7	0
2015	Brisbane Lions	10	21	9	8	240	168	408	57	67	0.4	0.4	11.4	8.0	19.4	2.7	3.2	3
2016	Brisbane Lions	10	21	17	8	256	156	412	67	93	0.8	0.4	12.2	7.4	19.6	3.2	4.4	0
2017	Brisbane Lions	10	22	8	11	322	147	469	81	35	0.4	0.5	14.6	6.7	21.3	3.7	1.6	4
2018	Brisbane Lions	10	18	1	4	219	133	352	68	42	0.0	0.2	12.1	7.3	19.5	3.7	2.3	0
2019	Brisbane Lions	10	24	4	4	432	108	540	137	48	0.1	0.1	18.0	4.5	22.5	5.7	2.0	0
2020 (Note: The 2020 season was played with 17 home-and-away matches per team (down from 22) and 16-minute quarters with time on (down from 20-minute quarters with time on) due to the impact of the COVID-19 pandemic.)	Brisbane Lions	10	15	4	2	218	39	257	74	19	0.2	0.1	14.5	2.6	17.1	4.9	1.2	2
2021	Brisbane Lions	10	24	3	10	514^{†}	110	624	137	42	0.1	0.4	21.4^{†}	4.6	26.0	5.7	1.8	6
2022	Brisbane Lions	10	22	1	3	404	104	508	99	35	0.0	0.1	18.4	4.7	23.1	4.5	1.6	0
2023	Brisbane Lions	10	7	2	0	113	24	137	38	2	0.3	0.0	16.1	3.4	19.6	5.4	0.3	1
Career			275	116	116	3857	1774	5631	1043	786	0.4	0.4	14.0	6.5	20.5	3.8	2.9	37

== Honours and achievements ==
Team

- NAB Cup (Brisbane Lions) 2013
- 2x WAFL Premiership Player (Subiaco) 2007, 2008

Individual

- All-Australian team: 2021
- AFL Rising Star Award: 2009
- AFLPA Best First-Year Player Award: 2009
- Michael Tuck Medal: 2013
- AFL Rising Star nominee: 2009 (round 1)
- Fox Footy Longest Kick winner: 2023
