= Tayte Pears =

Australian rules footballer

Personal information
- Full name: Tayte Pears
- Born: 24 March 1990 (age 36)
- Original team: East Perth (WAFL)
- Draft: No. 23, 2007 National Draft
- Height: 191 cm (6 ft 3 in)
- Weight: 93 kg (205 lb)
- Position: Defender

Playing career^{1}
| Years | Club | Games (Goals) |
| 2008–2016 | Essendon | 70 (3) |
- ^{1} Playing statistics correct to the end of 2016.

Career highlights
- 2009 AFL Rising Star nominee

Tayte Pears (born 24 March 1990) is a former professional Australian rules footballer who played as a tall defender for the Essendon Football Club in the Australian Football League (AFL). In his youth, Pears played as a forward, before shifting to the backline at the age of 16, where he spent his entire AFL career.

== AFL career ==
Pears was drafted by Essendon with pick 23 in the 2007 national draft and debuted in 2008. He played the role of a key position defender in his second season, taking on big dominant forwards such as Daniel Bradshaw, Jarryd Roughead and Justin Koschitzke. After playing on Brendan Fevola in round 13, 2009, he was the round nominee for the Rising Star.

Off-season surgery on a foot fracture that set back his return to senior football saw Pears’ bad run with injury continue in 2011. He played his first game of the year against North Melbourne in round 13, but saw his season further stifled with injury after breaking his lower leg and then straining his hamstring in the elimination final.

Injury continued to force him to sit on the sidelines in the years after, managing 23 games in the next four seasons. Then on 12 January 2016 Pears was named as one of 34 past and present Essendon players found guilty over their use of illegal supplements during the 2012 AFL season. As a result, Pears was suspended for two years, which, as a result of backdating, saw him suspended between January and November 2016, which meant he missed the entire 2016 AFL season. He did not return to the AFL after his suspension, announcing his retirement from the league on 8 September 2016 to pursue a career in firefighting.

== Statistics ==
Legend
| G | Goals | K | Kicks | D | Disposals | T | Tackles |
| B | Behinds | H | Handballs | M | Marks |

| Season | Team | No. | Games | Totals | | | | | | | Averages (per game) | | | | | | |
| Season | Team | No. | Games | G | B | K | H | D | M | T | G | B | K | H | D | M | T |
|---|---|---|---|---|---|---|---|---|---|---|---|---|---|---|---|---|---|
| 2008 | Essendon | 16 | 5 | 2 | 1 | 25 | 25 | 50 | 15 | 9 | 0.4 | 0.2 | 5.0 | 5.0 | 10.0 | 3.0 | 1.8 |
| 2009 | Essendon | 16 | 23 | 1 | 1 | 156 | 192 | 348 | 72 | 47 | 0.0 | 0.0 | 6.8 | 8.4 | 15.1 | 3.1 | 2.0 |
| 2010 | Essendon | 16 | 10 | 0 | 1 | 91 | 72 | 163 | 52 | 29 | 0.0 | 0.0 | 9.1 | 7.2 | 16.3 | 5.2 | 2.9 |
| 2011 | Essendon | 16 | 9 | 0 | 0 | 54 | 58 | 112 | 22 | 24 | 0.0 | 0.0 | 6.0 | 6.4 | 12.4 | 2.4 | 2.7 |
| 2012 | Essendon | 16 | 10 | 0 | 0 | 53 | 71 | 124 | 24 | 27 | 0.0 | 0.0 | 5.3 | 7.1 | 12.4 | 2.4 | 2.7 |
| 2013 | Essendon | 16 | 11 | 0 | 0 | 111 | 83 | 194 | 65 | 26 | 0.0 | 0.0 | 10.1 | 7.6 | 17.6 | 5.9 | 2.4 |
| 2014 | Essendon | 16 | 0 | — | — | — | — | — | — | — | — | — | — | — | — | — | — |
| 2015 | Essendon | 16 | 2 | 0 | 0 | 13 | 19 | 32 | 9 | 2 | 0.0 | 0.0 | 6.5 | 9.5 | 16.0 | 4.5 | 1.0 |
| 2016 | Essendon | 16 | 0 | — | — | — | — | — | — | — | — | — | — | — | — | — | — |
| Career | | | 70 | 3 | 3 | 503 | 520 | 1023 | 259 | 164 | 0.0 | 0.0 | 7.2 | 7.4 | 14.6 | 3.7 | 2.3 |
