= Drew Petrie =

Australian rules footballer (born 1982)

Personal information
- Full name: Drew Petrie
- Born: 15 October 1982 (age 44); Ballarat, Victoria, Australia
- Original teams: Ballarat Football Club; North Ballarat Rebels
- Draft: No. 23, 2000 national draft
- Height: 197 cm (6 ft 6 in)
- Weight: 101 kg (223 lb)
- Positions: Forward, ruckman

Playing career^{1}
Years	Club	Games (Goals)
2001–2016	North Melbourne	316 (428)
2017	West Coast	16 (16)
2017	East Perth	1 (0)
2019	West Coast (WAFL)	10 (0)
Total		343 (444)

International team honours^{2}
Years	Team	Games (Goals)
2008	Australia	2 (3)
- ^{1} Playing statistics correct to the end of 2017.^{2} Representative statistics correct as of 2008.

Career highlights
- 5× North Melbourne leading goalkicker: 2009, 2011, 2012, 2014, 2015; All-Australian team: 2011; Jason McCartney Medal: 2008; Inaugural Fox Footy Longest Kick winner: 2015

Drew Petrie (born 15 October 1982) is a former professional Australian rules footballer who played for the North Melbourne Football Club and the West Coast Eagles in the Australian Football League (AFL). He came out of retirement in 2019 to play for the West Coast Eagles in the Western Australian Football League (WAFL).

== AFL career ==
Petrie debuted in 2001 and played more than 300 games for North Melbourne Football Club. He played in a variety of roles for the Kangaroos including centre half-forward, defence and ruck. In a game against the Western Bulldogs in 2007 he helped inspire North Melbourne to a win in Glenn Archer's 300th match, kicking seven goals—six of them in the first quarter.

Petrie was selected by coach Mick Malthouse for Australia in the International Rules series against Ireland as a utility player. He was a key player during the second test at MCG, scoring two overs (three points each) in quick succession early in the last quarter. He added a goal (six points) in the final minute giving Australia some hope of snatching a win. In the end, however, Ireland won the series by five points (on aggregate).

Petrie was named vice-captain of North Melbourne at the start of the 2009 season and filled-in for the newly appointed captain, Brent Harvey, who missed half the season with an elbow injury. Petrie was North Melbourne's top goal scorer in 2009 with 27 goals and again in 2011 with 48.

After missing most of the 2010 season. In 2011, Petrie was selected in the All-Australian Team on the interchange.

Early in the season Petrie struggled to have the same impact as the previous year. However the forward was still finding ways to get on the scoreboard, kicking a respectable 12 goals in the first seven games. From that point he turned on an impressive feat of goal kicking form, managing 46 in the final 15 matches despite being used as a decoy on multiple occasions. Petrie kicked 23 goals between rounds 16 and 19 to temporarily lead the Coleman Medal. His final tally of 58 goals was the highest of his career and pushed him past 250 career goals.

Petrie was instrumental in North's 2014 elimination final defeat of arch rival Essendon by kicking the final 2 goals of the game to seal victory.

In August 2016, North Melbourne announced they would not renew Petrie's contract for the 2017 season. He was subsequently drafted by the West Coast Eagles in the 2017 rookie draft. Drew Petrie played the final game of his AFL career in the 2017 semi final, where he recorded one goal, seven disposals and five marks in a 67-point loss to Greater Western Sydney.

In 2019 a lack of squad players and a lack of tall forwards contributed to the West Coast Eagles requesting Drew come out of retirement to play for the WAFL team.

== Statistics ==
Legend
G	Goals	K	Kicks	D	Disposals	T	Tackles
B	Behinds	H	Handballs	M	Marks	H/O	Hit-outs

Season	Team	No.	Games	Totals								Averages (per game)								Votes
Season	Team	No.	Games	G	B	K	H	D	M	T	H/O	G	B	K	H	D	M	T	H/O	Votes
2001	Kangaroos	20	9	0	0	26	9	35	10	13	38	0.0	0.0	2.9	1.0	3.9	1.1	1.4	4.2	0
2002	Kangaroos	20	10	10	7	45	22	67	20	30	24	1.0	0.7	4.5	2.2	6.7	2.0	3.0	2.4	0
2003	Kangaroos	20	22	28	21	172	64	236	107	67	76	1.3	1.0	7.8	2.9	10.7	4.9	3.0	3.5	3
2004	Kangaroos	20	22	20	18	166	57	223	84	53	52	0.9	0.8	7.5	2.6	10.1	3.8	2.4	2.4	1
2005	Kangaroos	20	22	11	7	169	59	228	84	66	229	0.5	0.3	7.7	2.7	10.4	3.8	3.0	10.4	0
2006	Kangaroos	20	21	4	3	208	104	312	158	54	87	0.2	0.1	9.9	5.0	14.9	7.5	2.6	4.1	5
2007	Kangaroos	20	25	38	16	226	78	304	138	66	125	1.5	0.6	9.0	3.1	12.2	5.5	2.6	5.0	5
2008	North Melbourne	20	23	17	15	228	139	367	154	57	219	0.7	0.7	9.9	6.0	16.0	6.7	2.5	9.5	11
2009	North Melbourne	20	22	27	21	221	111	332	145	89	82	1.2	1.0	10.0	5.0	15.1	6.6	4.0	3.7	5
2010	North Melbourne	20	2	0	1	13	8	21	7	5	2	0.0	0.5	6.5	4.0	10.5	3.5	2.5	1.0	0
2011	North Melbourne	20	21	48	41	222	72	294	129	58	98	2.3	2.0	10.6	3.4	14.0	6.1	2.8	4.7	11
2012	North Melbourne	20	23	58	18	205	91	296	147	56	55	2.5	0.8	8.9	4.0	12.9	6.4	2.4	2.4	9
2013	North Melbourne	20	22	48	19	230	79	309	133	63	72	2.2	0.9	10.5	3.6	14.0	6.0	2.9	3.3	10
2014	North Melbourne	20	25	50	39	213	90	303	135	61	23	2.0	1.6	8.5	3.6	12.1	5.4	2.4	0.9	2
2015	North Melbourne	20	24	42	29	219	98	317	168	62	11	1.8	1.2	9.1	4.1	13.2	7.0	2.6	0.5	7
2016	North Melbourne	20	23	27	19	168	85	253	110	52	13	1.2	0.8	7.3	3.7	11.0	4.8	2.3	0.6	3
2017	West Coast	21	16	16	3	132	61	193	76	53	195	1.0	0.2	8.3	3.8	12.1	4.8	3.3	12.2	0
Career			332	444	277	2863	1227	4090	1805	905	1401	1.3	0.8	8.6	3.7	12.3	5.4	2.7	4.2	72
