= 2009 AFL Rising Star =

Australian rules football award

2009 NAB AFL Rising Star
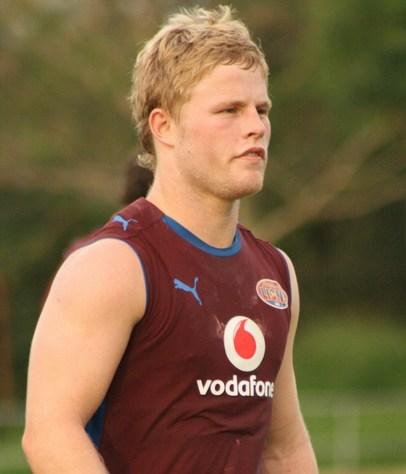
- Daniel Rich, winner of the 2009 AFL Rising Star award, during 2008
- Sponsored by: National Australia Bank
- Date: 2 September
- Country: Australia
- Ron Evans medallist: Daniel Rich (Brisbane Lions)

The NAB AFL Rising Star award is given annually to a stand out young player in the Australian Football League. The 2009 Ron Evans medal was won by Brisbane Lions player Daniel Rich.

== Eligibility ==
Every round, an Australian Football League rising star nomination is given to a stand out young player. To be eligible for the award, a player must be under 21 on 1 January of that year, have played 10 or fewer senior games and not been suspended during the season. At the end of the year, one of the 22 nominees is the winner of award.

== Nominations ==
| Round | Player | Club | Ref. |
|---|---|---|---|
| 1 | Daniel Rich | Brisbane Lions | |
| 2 | David Zaharakis | Essendon | |
| 3 | Patrick Dangerfield | Adelaide | |
| 4 | Jaxson Barham | Collingwood | |
| 5 | Garry Moss | Hawthorn | |
| 6 | Stephen Hill | Fremantle | |
| 7 | Jack Ziebell | North Melbourne | |
| 8 | Jarryn Geary | St Kilda | |
| 9 | Andy Otten | Adelaide | |
| 10 | Taylor Walker | Adelaide | |
| 11 | Brad Dick | Collingwood | |
| 12 | Aaron Joseph | Carlton | |
| 13 | Tayte Pears | Essendon | |
| 14 | Jack Grimes | Melbourne | |
| 15 | Liam Jurrah | Melbourne | |
| 16 | Chris Masten | West Coast | |
| 17 | Dayne Beams | Collingwood | |
| 18 | Callan Ward | Western Bulldogs | |
| 19 | Mitch Brown | West Coast | |
| 20 | Michael Hurley | Essendon | |
| 21 | Nick Suban | Fremantle | |
| 22 | Jesse White | Sydney | |

== Final voting ==
| | Player | Club | Votes |
|---|---|---|---|
| 1 | Daniel Rich | Brisbane Lions | 45 |
| 2 | Andy Otten | Adelaide | 30 |
| 3 | Tayte Pears | Essendon | 28 |
| 4 | Dayne Beams | Collingwood | 10 |
| 5 | Stephen Hill | Fremantle | 9 |
| 5 | Callan Ward | Western Bulldogs | 9 |
| 7 | Patrick Dangerfield | Adelaide | 4 |
Source: AFL Record Season Guide 2015
