= Fox Footy Longest Kick =

Annual kicking competition

Fox Footy Longest Kick, established by Fox Footy in 2015, is an annual kicking competition. Each year, ten or more players take turns to try to kick a Sherrin football as far as they can across the Yarra River, with the winner being the person who kicks the farthest. The competition takes place on the AFL Grand Final day each year. The reigning champion is Daniel Rich, who kicked a 69.5-metre (228 ft) torpedo punt on the day of the 2023 AFL Grand Final.

As of the completion of the 2023 edition, Bryce Gibbs' 72.3-metre (237 ft) kick from 2016 is the record, and nobody has ever cleared the river. Due to a revitalisation project at Birrarung Marr on the banks of the Yarra River, the 2024 edition did not go ahead.

== Procedure ==
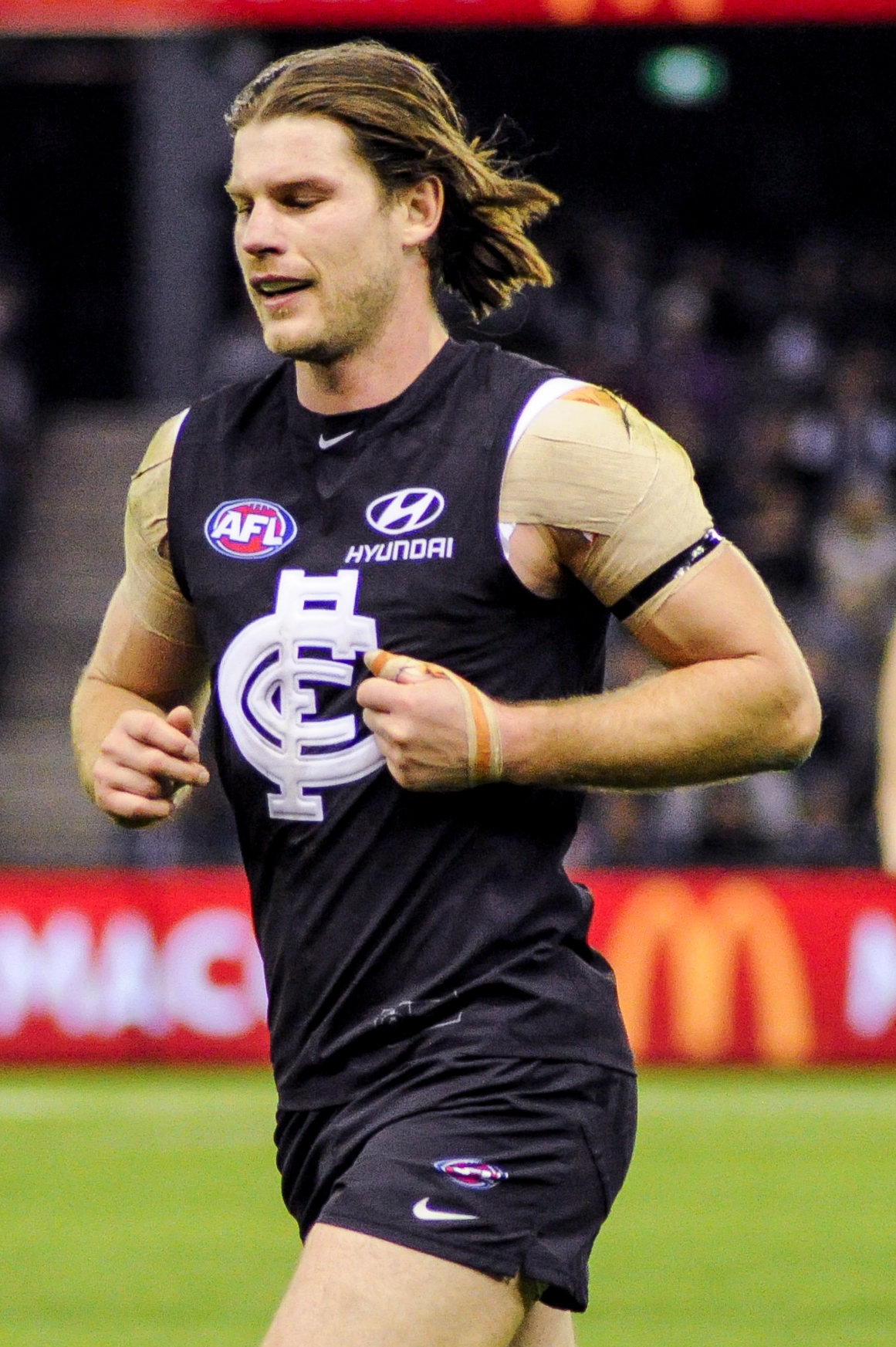
Bryce Gibbs, pictured here in 2017, holds the record for the longest-ever kick in the competition, kicking 72.3 metres (237.2 ft) to win 2016's edition

Each year, ten or more players (usually a combination of past and current AFL players, although sometimes AFLW players and potential draftees are among the line-up as a wildcard) compete to see who can kick the longest distance over the Yarra River. Usually, a torpedo punt is the type of kick used, as this kick is well known for being the longest kick in Australian rules football. Each player has two kicks in the first round, with each player taking one kick at a time and then rotating out sequentially.

The five players with the longest kicks make it through to the final round, where they have two more kicks in an attempt to improve their kicks. The player with the longest kick out of both rounds is declared the victor and wins A$10,000 and a year's possession of a custom perpetual trophy that features a football, grass, and a disembodied foot.

| Year | Winning Player | Distance |
|---|---|---|
| 2015 | Drew Petrie | 60.4 metres (198.2 ft) |
| 2016 | Bryce Gibbs | 72.3 metres (237.2 ft) |
| 2017 | Brendan Fevola | 66.1 metres (216.9 ft) |
| 2018 | Jack Gunston | 66.9 metres (219.5 ft) |
| 2019 | Clayton Oliver | 66.8 metres (219.2 ft) |
| 2021 | Jarryd Roughead | 59.0 metres (193.6 ft) |
| 2022 | Charlie Curnow | 62.9 metres (206.4 ft) |
| 2023 | Daniel Rich | 69.5 metres (228.0 ft) |

Notes:

a) The event was not held in 2020 due to the COVID-19 pandemic

b) The event was not held in 2024 due to a revitalisation project at Birrarung Marr

== See also ==
- List of AFL Grand Final pre-match performances
- AFL Grand Final Sprint
