= Dayne Beams =

Australian rules footballer

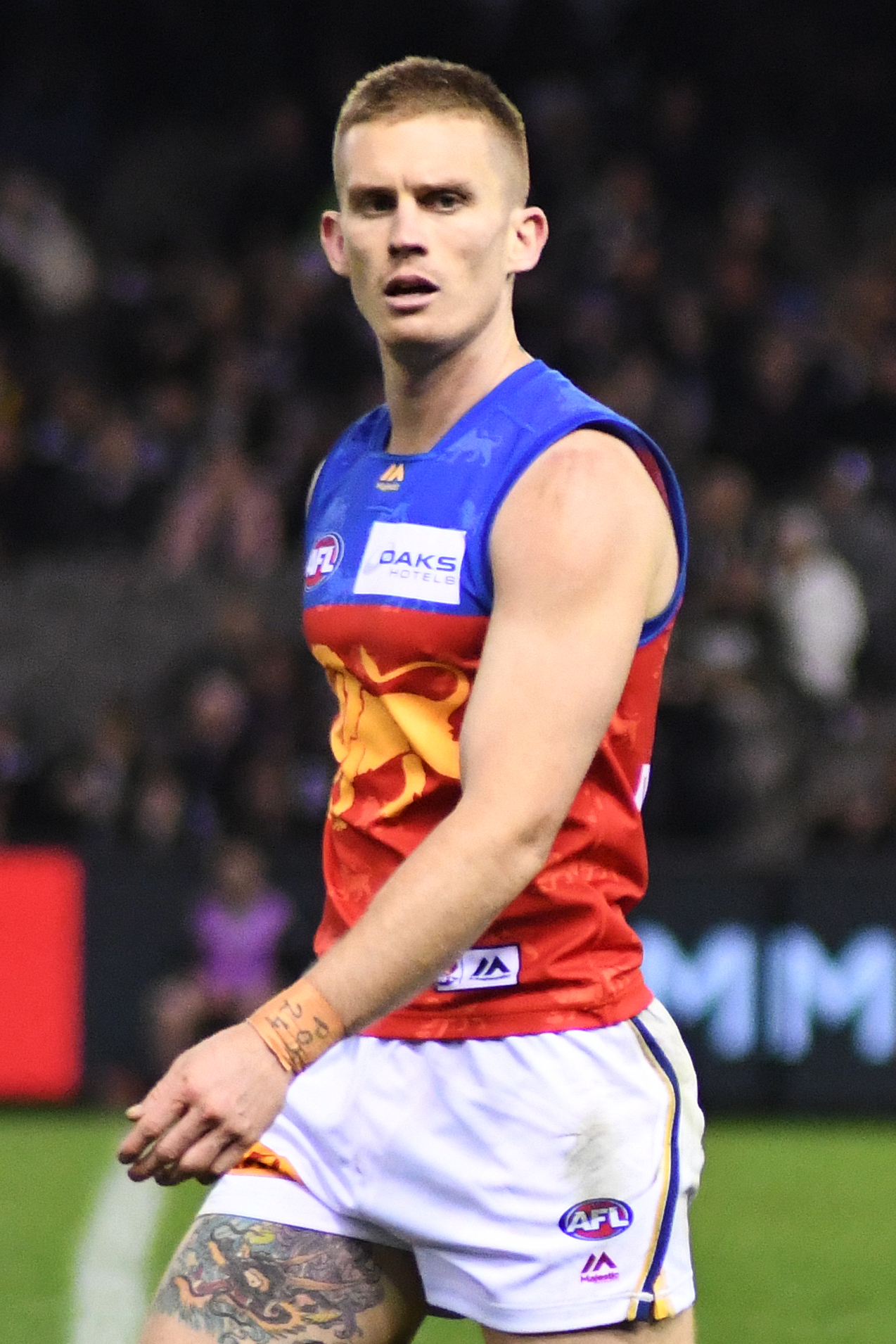
- Beams playing for Brisbane in August 2018

Personal information
- Full name: Dayne Beams
- Nicknames: Beama, Beamsy
- Born: 12 February 1990 (age 36); Yarrawonga, Victoria
- Original team: Southport (QAFL)
- Draft: No. 29, 2008 national draft
- Height: 187 cm (6 ft 2 in)
- Weight: 88 kg (194 lb)
- Position: Midfielder

Playing career^{1}
Years	Club	Games (Goals)
2009–2014	Collingwood	110 (118)
2015–2018	Brisbane Lions	58(49)
2019–2020	Collingwood	9(5)
Total		177 (172)
- ^{1} Playing statistics correct to the end of the 2019 season.

Career highlights
- AFL premiership player: 2010; All-Australian team: 2012; Merrett–Murray Medallist: 2015; Copeland Trophy: 2012; Brisbane Lions captain: 2017–2018; 3× Marcus Ashcroft Medal: 2016, 2017, 2018; 22under22 team: 2012; AFL Rising Star nominee: 2009

Dayne Beams (born 12 February 1990) is a former professional Australian rules footballer who played for the Collingwood Football Club in the Australian Football League (AFL). He also previously played for, and captained, the Brisbane Lions during the 2017 season, however he stepped down as captain during the 2018 season due to personal issues. He retired in October 2020 due to personal issues.

== Early life ==
Beams was born in Yarrawonga and moved with his family to the Gold Coast at four years of age. A talented junior footballer, he received a sports scholarship to attend Palm Beach Currumbin State High School in his teenage years and worked as a groundskeeper for the Southport Sharks. Outside of football, Beams was also a talented cricketer in his younger years.

Beams began playing football on the Gold Coast for the Mudgeeraba Saints at six years of age and would later switch to the Southport Australian Football Club, where he debuted for the senior team in 2007 at the age of 17. In 2008, he would solidify his spot in the Southport midfield as well as captaining the Queensland U18 team at the National Championships. Beams would go on to be a part of the QAFL senior premiership winning side later that year for Southport. He would kick an early Grand Final goal for Southport as they claimed an 8-point victory over Morningside at Carrara Stadium. In October 2008, Beams rejected a guaranteed three-year contract with the GC17 expansion team and instead opted to enter the 2008 AFL draft.

== AFL career ==
=== Collingwood (2009–2014) ===
Beams was selected by Collingwood with selection 29 in the 2008 AFL draft. A versatile midfielder who could defend and attack, Beams was a high possession winner who was balanced and composed when in close proximity to opponents. Beams was linked to the new Queensland based club in 2009, but signed an extension to his Collingwood contract to the end of the 2012 season.

Beams played three games in the NAB Cup kicking a goal in each game, including a super goal against Essendon. He made his AFL debut in round 2, when Dale Thomas was a late withdrawal from the team due to a virus.

Beams finished fourth in the NAB Rising Star 2009 after being nominated in round 17. He won the Harry Collier Trophy in 2009 as Collingwood's best first year player.

Beams had a breakout year in 2012. He averaged over 31 possessions a game, impressing in best-on-ground performances against Adelaide, West Coast and Sydney. His rise was most notably attributed to the long-term injury of midfielder Luke Ball in round 3. Beams led the entire AFL for handball receives and was third in the competition for disposals. He was also in contention for the 2012 Brownlow Medal along with teammates Scott Pendlebury and Dane Swan.

As a result of Beams' breakout 2012 season, he was awarded the 2012 3AW Player of the Year award, ahead of Essendon's Jobe Watson, Gold Coast's Gary Ablett Jr. and Hawthorn's Sam Mitchell.

To cap off the 2012 season, which saw Beams become one of the games' elite midfielders, he was selected in the 2012 All-Australian Team on a wing. Adding to this recognition, Beams finished the season winning the E.W. Copeland Trophy beating of 2011 winner Scott Pendlebury by 35 votes. Beams had an up and down 2013 season after niggling quad injuries. Beams finally made his AFL return in round 16, 2013 and averaged over 30 possessions for the remainder of the season.

=== Brisbane Lions (2015–2018) ===
At the end of the 2014 season, Beams asked to be traded to the Brisbane Lions in order to be closer to his ill father and also to play with his younger brother, Claye Beams. On 15 October 2014, Beams was officially traded to the Lions.

In 2015, he was the joint winner of the Merrett–Murray Medal as Brisbane's best and fairest, alongside Stefan Martin, Mitch Robinson and Dayne Zorko.

In early 2016, Beams was elevated to Brisbane's leadership group and given the vice captaincy alongside Daniel Merrett, Dayne Zorko, Daniel Rich and Pearce Hanley.

Prior to the 2017 season, Beams was announced as the captain of the Brisbane Lions. On 24 May 2017, it was announced that he would wear number 50 on his guernsey, rather than his usual 9, for the round 10 Sir Doug Nicholls Indigenous Round game against Collingwood. This was to commemorate the 50th anniversary of the 1967 referendum which allowed Indigenous Australians to be counted with the general population in the census.

Beams stepped down as the Brisbane captain, handing over to Dayne Zorko, in order to deal with the passing of his father, Phillip. Beams went on to have an outstanding 2018 season, averaging 29 disposals and obtaining over 30 disposals, a high of 40 against Carlton in round 16, in 10 of the games.

=== Collingwood (2019–2020) ===
At the end of the 2018 season, Beams indicated that he intended to see out his playing contract in Brisbane despite speculation during the season that he would seek a trade back to a Victorian club. Despite that, Beams later requested a trade back to Collingwood and was traded within the last half an hour of the 2018 AFL trade period.

After not playing a game in the 2020 season and battling a gambling and prescription drug addiction, Beams retired from the AFL.

== Outside AFL ==
=== Sexual assault complaint ===
In October 2010, Beams was involved in an allegation of sexual assault that occurred in the early hours of the morning after the 2010 AFL grand final replay. A woman made a complaint against Beams and two other men, saying she felt "compelled, but not forced" to have sex with Beams. Beams was not charged. In 2012 Beams gave evidence at the rape trial of one of the other men, who was found not guilty.

=== Big Brother VIP ===
In August 2021, Beams was announced as a contestant on the celebrity version of Big Brother Australia.

== Statistics ==
Statistics are correct to the end of the 2020 season

Legend
G	Goals	K	Kicks	D	Disposals	T	Tackles
B	Behinds	H	Handballs	M	Marks

Season	Team	No.	Games	Totals							Averages (per game)							Votes
Season	Team	No.	Games	G	B	K	H	D	M	T	G	B	K	H	D	M	T	Votes
2009	Collingwood	17	18	14	11	143	175	318	84	42	0.8	0.6	7.9	9.7	17.7	4.7	2.3	5
2010	Collingwood	17	25	26	32	255	255	510	107	75	1.0	1.3	10.2	10.2	20.4	4.3	3.0	2
2011	Collingwood	17	16	21	10	188	177	365	82	58	1.3	0.6	11.8	11.1	22.8	5.1	3.6	1
2012	Collingwood	17	24	28	16	380	361	741	108	101	1.2	0.7	15.8	15.0	30.9	4.5	4.2	19
2013	Collingwood	17	8	6	3	109	119	228	37	31	0.8	0.4	13.6	14.9	28.5	4.6	3.9	1
2014	Collingwood	17	19	23	16	278	238	516	68	100	1.2	0.8	14.6	12.5	27.2	3.6	5.3	16
2015	Brisbane Lions	9	16	10	11	232	219	451	72	67	0.6	0.7	14.5	13.7	28.2	4.5	4.2	9
2016	Brisbane Lions	9	2	1	1	27	21	48	7	5	0.5	0.5	13.5	10.5	24.0	3.5	2.5	0
2017	Brisbane Lions	9/50	19	20	11	276	238	514	86	79	1.1	0.6	14.5	12.5	27.1	4.5	4.2	17
2018	Brisbane Lions	9	21	18	13	330	282	612	114	62	0.9	0.6	15.7	13.4	29.1	5.4	3.0	18
2019	Collingwood	11	9	5	4	124	102	226	38	19	0.6	0.4	13.8	11.3	25.1	4.2	2.1	2
2020	Collingwood	11	0	—	—	—	—	—	—	—	—	—	—	—	—	—	—	
Career			177	172	128	2342	2187	4529	803	639	1.0	0.7	13.2	12.4	25.6	4.5	3.6	90
