= 2018 AFL season =

122nd season of the Australian Football League (AFL)

2018 AFL premiership season
- Date: 22 March – 29 September
- Teams: 18
- Premiers: West Coast; 4th premiership
- Runners-up: Collingwood (27th runners-up)
- Minor premiers: Richmond; 9th minor premiership
- Brownlow Medallist: Tom Mitchell (Hawthorn – 28 votes)
- Coleman Medallist: Jack Riewoldt (Richmond – 65 goals)

Attendance
- Matches played: 207
- Total attendance: 7,595,165 (36,692 per match)
- Highest (H&A): 91,440 (round 5, Collingwood v Essendon)
- Highest (finals): 100,022 (Grand Final, West Coast vs. Collingwood)

The 2018 AFL season was the 122nd season of the Australian Football League (AFL), the highest level senior men's Australian rules football competition in Australia, which was known as the Victorian Football League until 1989. The season featured eighteen clubs, ran from 22 March until 29 September, and comprised a 22-game home-and-away season followed by a finals series featuring the top eight clubs.

The premiership was won by the West Coast Eagles for the fourth time, after they defeated Collingwood by five points in the 2018 AFL Grand Final.

== Pre-season ==
The pre-season began with the 2018 AFLX competition. Played under modified AFLX rules, the game is played on a soccer-sized pitch over two ten minute halves by teams of seven players plus interchange players. It was the first of two AFLX pre-season competitions to be held featuring AFL players. The matches were played from 15–17 February 2018. The winners of the competition were Adelaide, Melbourne and Brisbane.

The pre-season series was then played, known as the 2018 JLT Community Series. The number of games was reduced compared to the previous season, with teams playing two games each. The games were stand-alone, with no overall winner of the series. Each team played two games, many at suburban or regional venues. All matches were televised live on Fox Footy as well as on the AFL Live app. The nine-point super goal for a goal kicked from beyond 50m was eliminated from the rules; it had featured in all pre-season competitions since 2003.

	Week 1
Saturday, 24 February (2:05 pm)	North Melbourne 11.5 (71)	def. by	Melbourne 19.10 (124)	Kingston Twin Ovals, Hobart (crowd: 1,957)	Report
Saturday, 24 February (4:35 pm)	Essendon 5.7 (37)	def. by	Richmond 19.10 (124)	Norm Minns Oval (crowd: 7,681)	Report
Sunday, 25 February (1:35 pm)	Adelaide 13.13 (91)	def.	Fremantle 12.9 (81)	Strathalbyn Oval, Strathalbyn (crowd: 6,398)	Report
Sunday, 25 February (3:35 pm)	West Coast 8.8 (56)	def.	Port Adelaide 8.6 (54)	Leederville Oval (crowd: 4,317)	Report

	Week 2
Wednesday, 28 February (7:10 pm)	Carlton 13.11 (89)	def.	St Kilda 9.13 (67)	Ikon Park (crowd: 8,098)	Report
Thursday, 1 March (7:10 pm)	Greater Western Sydney 14.12 (96)	def.	Collingwood 5.6 (36)	UNSW Canberra Oval (crowd: 6,642)	Report
Saturday, 3 March (2:05 pm)	Western Bulldogs 15.10 (100)	def.	Hawthorn 11.12 (78)	Mars Stadium (crowd: 4,565)	Report
Saturday, 3 March (3:35 pm)	Brisbane Lions 5.10 (40)	def. by	Sydney 14.11 (95)	Moreton Bay Central Sports Complex (crowd: 1,901)	Report
Sunday, 4 March (3:35 pm)	Gold Coast 12.13 (85)	def.	Geelong 3.11 (29)	Tony Ireland Stadium (crowd: 3,206)	Report

	Week 3
Wednesday, 7 March (7:05 pm)	Richmond 19.14 (128)	def.	North Melbourne 8.10 (58)	Ikon Park (crowd: 4,197)	Report
Thursday, 8 March (7:05 pm)	Melbourne 18.11 (119)	def.	St Kilda 14.9 (93)	Casey Fields (crowd: 4,567)	Report
Friday, 9 March (7:05 pm)	Sydney 12.10 (82)	def.	Greater Western Sydney 9.17 (71)	Blacktown International Sportspark (crowd: 1,980)	Report
Saturday, 10 March (1:05 pm)	Collingwood 16.17 (113)	def.	Western Bulldogs 12.8 (80)	Ted Summerton Reserve, Moe (crowd: 3,442)	Report
Saturday, 10 March (3:35 pm)	Port Adelaide 16.2 (98)	def.	Adelaide 11.6 (72)	Alberton Oval (crowd: 6,157)	Report
Saturday, 10 March (7:05 pm)	Hawthorn 13.19 (97)	def. by	Carlton 16.6 (102)	University of Tasmania Stadium (crowd: 5,405)	Report
Sunday, 11 March (1:05 pm)	Geelong 15.7 (97)	def. by	Essendon 15.11 (101)	Central Reserve, Colac (crowd: 9,115)	Report
Sunday, 11 March (3:05 pm)	Gold Coast 7.7 (49)	def.	Brisbane Lions 4.18 (42)	Fankhauser Reserve (crowd: 1,649)	Report
Sunday, 11 March (4:05 pm)	Fremantle 14.17 (101)	def.	West Coast 5.9 (39)	HBF Arena (crowd: 7,737)	Report

== Premiership season ==
=== Round 1 ===
	Round 1 (Opening Round)
Thursday, 22 March (7:25 pm)	Richmond 17.19 (121)	def.	Carlton 15.5 (95)	MCG (crowd: 90,151)	Report
Friday, 23 March (7:50 pm)	Essendon 14.15 (99)	def.	Adelaide 12.15 (87)	Etihad Stadium (crowd: 43,016)	Report
Saturday, 24 March (3:35 pm)	St Kilda 16.11 (107)	def.	Brisbane Lions 12.10 (82)	Etihad Stadium (crowd: 23,731)	Report
Saturday, 24 March (4:05 pm)	Port Adelaide 16.14 (110)	def.	Fremantle 9.6 (60)	Adelaide Oval (crowd: 38,324)	Report
Saturday, 24 March (6:25 pm)	Gold Coast 7.13 (55)	def.	North Melbourne 5.9 (39)	Cazalys Stadium (crowd: 3,722)	Report
Saturday, 24 March (7:25 pm)	Hawthorn 15.11 (101)	def.	Collingwood 9.13 (67)	MCG (crowd: 58,051)	Report
Sunday, 25 March (1:10 pm)	Greater Western Sydney 20.13 (133)	def.	Western Bulldogs 7.9 (51)	UNSW Canberra Oval (crowd: 10,454)	Report
Sunday, 25 March (3:20 pm)	Melbourne 13.16 (94)	def. by	Geelong 14.13 (97)	MCG (crowd: 54,112)	Report
Sunday, 25 March (4:20 pm)	West Coast 13.8 (86)	def. by	Sydney 18.7 (115)	Optus Stadium (crowd: 53,553)	Report
The West Coast vs. Sydney game was the first AFL premiership season game held at the newly-constructed Optus Stadium.; The crowd of 90,151 for the Richmond vs. Carlton game is the highest attendance for a match in round 1 in VFL/AFL history, breaking the previous record of 87,119 set in 1995.; Tom Mitchell (Hawthorn) recorded 54 disposals against Collingwood, the most ever recorded in any game, surpassing the record set by Greg Williams (Sydney) in 1989 and matched by Gary Ablett, Jr. (Gold Coast) in 2012. Mitchell's tally of 34 handballs was also an all time record.; The crowd of 3,722 for the Gold Coast vs. North Melbourne game was the lowest attendance for a home-and-away season match since round 9, 1992.; North Melbourne's score of 5.9 (39) was the lowest score conceded by Gold Coast in its history.; Every goal in the Gold Coast vs. North Melbourne game was kicked at the same end of the ground, the first time this had happened since 1977.; North Melbourne took only 21 marks during the same game, the lowest number recorded since records were kept in 1999.

=== Round 2 ===
	Round 2 (Easter)
Thursday, 29 March (7:20 pm)	Adelaide 18.10 (118)	def.	Richmond 12.10 (82)	Adelaide Oval (crowd: 49,743)	Report
Friday, 30 March (4:20 pm)	North Melbourne 13.17 (95)	def.	St Kilda 5.13 (43)	Etihad Stadium (crowd: 33,966)	Report
Saturday, 31 March (1:45 pm)	Carlton 9.13 (67)	def. by	Gold Coast 15.11 (101)	Etihad Stadium (crowd: 28,025)	Report
Saturday, 31 March (4:35 pm)	Collingwood 12.7 (79)	def. by	Greater Western Sydney 15.5 (95)	MCG (crowd: 30,941)	Report
Saturday, 31 March (6:25 pm)	Brisbane Lions 10.14 (74)	def. by	Melbourne 14.16 (100)	Gabba (crowd: 17,141)	Report
Saturday, 31 March (5:10 pm)	Fremantle 16.10 (106)	def.	Essendon 14.6 (90)	Optus Stadium (crowd: 49,021)	Report
Sunday, 1 April (3:20 pm)	Western Bulldogs 9.16 (70)	def. by	West Coast 18.13 (121)	Etihad Stadium (crowd: 22,868)	Report
Sunday, 1 April (4:40 pm)	Sydney 10.11 (71)	def. by	Port Adelaide 14.10 (94)	SCG (crowd: 34,636)	Report
Monday, 2 April (3:20 pm)	Geelong 18.9 (117)	def. by	Hawthorn 17.16 (118)	MCG (crowd: 73,189)	Report

=== Round 3 ===
	Round 3
Friday, 6 April (7:50 pm)	Carlton 11.10 (76)	def. by	Collingwood 16.4 (100)	MCG (crowd: 68,548)	Report
Saturday, 7 April (1:15 pm)	Port Adelaide 14.13 (97)	def.	Brisbane Lions 14.8 (92)	Adelaide Oval (crowd: 36,363)	Report
Saturday, 7 April (2:10 pm)	Melbourne 18.15 (123)	def.	North Melbourne 13.8 (86)	MCG (crowd: 35,518)	Report
Saturday, 7 April (2:35 pm)	Gold Coast 10.8 (68)	def. by	Fremantle 13.18 (96)	Optus Stadium (crowd: 33,388)	Report
Saturday, 7 April (7:25 pm)	Sydney 16.7 (103)	def.	Greater Western Sydney 12.15 (87)	SCG (crowd: 34,711)	Report
Saturday, 7 April (7:25 pm)	St Kilda 7.13 (55)	def. by	Adelaide 15.14 (104)	Etihad Stadium (crowd: 19,324)	Report
Sunday, 8 April (1:10 pm)	Richmond 15.12 (102)	def.	Hawthorn 13.11 (89)	MCG (crowd: 70,701)	Report
Sunday, 8 April (3:20 pm)	Western Bulldogs 14.20 (104)	def.	Essendon 12.11 (83)	Etihad Stadium (crowd: 40,499)	Report
Sunday, 8 April (2:40 pm)	West Coast 14.11 (95)	def.	Geelong 11.14 (80)	Optus Stadium (crowd: 54,535)	Report
Due to Metricon Stadium being used for the 2018 Commonwealth Games, the Gold Coast vs. Fremantle game was played at Optus Stadium in Perth, with Gold Coast as the home team. The crowd of 33,388 is the largest Gold Coast home crowd in the club's history.; Melbourne defeated North Melbourne for the first time since round 20, 2006, ending a 17-game losing streak against North Melbourne.

=== Round 4 ===
	Round 4
Friday, 13 April (7:20 pm)	Adelaide 9.4 (58)	def. by	Collingwood 16.10 (106)	Adelaide Oval (crowd: 45,495)	Report
Saturday, 14 April (1:45 pm)	Greater Western Sydney 11.16 (82)	def.	Fremantle 7.9 (51)	UNSW Canberra Oval (crowd: 11,356)	Report
Saturday, 14 April (2:10 pm)	Richmond 16.14 (110)	def.	Brisbane Lions 2.5 (17)	MCG (crowd: 32,870)	Report
Saturday, 14 April (4:35 pm)	Western Bulldogs 11.13 (79)	def. by	Sydney 13.8 (86)	Etihad Stadium (crowd: 28,058)	Report
Saturday, 14 April (7:25 pm)	North Melbourne 18.8 (116)	def.	Carlton 4.6 (30)	Blundstone Arena (crowd: 14,266)	Report
Saturday, 14 April (6:10 pm)	West Coast 21.13 (139)	def.	Gold Coast 9.5 (59)	Optus Stadium (crowd: 51,774)	Report
Sunday, 15 April (1:10 pm)	Essendon 16.10 (106)	def.	Port Adelaide 12.12 (84)	Etihad Stadium (crowd: 30,900)	Report
Sunday, 15 April (3:20 pm)	Hawthorn 18.7 (115)	def.	Melbourne 6.12 (48)	MCG (crowd: 41,973)	Report
Sunday, 15 April (4:40 pm)	Geelong 15.13 (103)	def.	St Kilda 7.14 (56)	GMHBA Stadium (crowd: 27,338)	Report
The Brisbane Lions' score of 2.5 (17) is its lowest score in club history and the lowest score by a team in any AFL game since Fremantle scored 1.7 (13) in round 15, 2009. It was also the lowest score at the MCG since 1962.; Carlton's score of 4.6 (30) is its lowest ever score against North Melbourne and its lowest score since round 9, 1995, in addition to also being the lowest ever score at Blundstone Arena.

=== Round 5 ===
	Round 5 (ANZAC Round)
Friday, 20 April (7:50 pm)	Sydney 10.15 (75)	def. by	Adelaide 12.13 (85)	SCG (crowd: 38,017)	Report
Saturday, 21 April (1:45 pm)	St Kilda 10.13 (73)	drew with	Greater Western Sydney 9.19 (73)	Etihad Stadium (crowd: 14,956)	Report
Saturday, 21 April (4:35 pm)	Carlton 10.9 (69)	def. by	West Coast 10.19 (79)	MCG (crowd: 27,900)	Report
Saturday, 21 April (7:10 pm)	Port Adelaide 7.8 (50)	def. by	Geelong 12.12 (84)	Adelaide Oval (crowd: 45,372)	Report
Saturday, 21 April (6:10 pm)	Fremantle 16.12 (108)	def.	Western Bulldogs 8.6 (54)	Optus Stadium (crowd: 43,056)	Report
Sunday, 22 April (3:20 pm)	North Melbourne 14.14 (98)	def.	Hawthorn 11.4 (70)	Etihad Stadium (crowd: 27,981)	Report
Sunday, 22 April (4:40 pm)	Brisbane Lions 10.11 (71)	def. by	Gold Coast 11.10 (76)	Gabba (crowd: 16,087)	Report
Tuesday, 24 April (7:25 pm)	Melbourne 8.8 (56)	def. by	Richmond 15.12 (102)	MCG (crowd: 77,071)	Report
Wednesday, 25 April (3:20 pm)	Collingwood 14.17 (101)	def.	Essendon 7.10 (52)	MCG (crowd: 91,440)	Report

=== Round 6 ===
	Round 6
Friday, 27 April (7:50 pm)	Western Bulldogs 11.14 (80)	def.	Carlton 8.11 (59)	Etihad Stadium (crowd: 33,915)	Report
Saturday, 28 April (1:45 pm)	Geelong 10.9 (69)	def. by	Sydney 12.14 (86)	GMHBA Stadium (crowd: 31,036)	Report
Saturday, 28 April (2:10 pm)	North Melbourne 10.9 (69)	def. by	Port Adelaide 15.12 (102)	Etihad Stadium (crowd: 17,617)	Report
Saturday, 28 April (4:35 pm)	Greater Western Sydney 10.17 (77)	def.	Brisbane Lions 5.13 (43)	Spotless Stadium (crowd: 10,046)	Report
Saturday, 28 April (7:25 pm)	Hawthorn 13.11 (89)	def.	St Kilda 7.12 (54)	University of Tasmania Stadium (crowd: 15,741)	Report
Saturday, 28 April (7:10 pm)	Adelaide 16.14 (110)	def.	Gold Coast 9.8 (62)	Adelaide Oval (crowd: 44,835)	Report
Sunday, 29 April (1:10 pm)	Essendon 10.12 (72)	def. by	Melbourne 16.12 (108)	Etihad Stadium (crowd: 35,964)	Report
Sunday, 29 April (3:20 pm)	Collingwood 10.10 (70)	def. by	Richmond 16.17 (113)	MCG (crowd: 72,157)	Report
Sunday, 29 April (2:40 pm)	Fremantle 12.9 (81)	def. by	West Coast 13.11 (89)	Optus Stadium (crowd: 56,521)	Report
Josh Kennedy (West Coast) kicked his 515th goal to surpass Peter Sumich as West Coast's all-time leading goalkicker.

=== Round 7 ===
	Round 7
Friday, 4 May (7:50 pm)	Geelong 14.9 (93)	def.	Greater Western Sydney 4.8 (32)	GMHBA Stadium (crowd: 25,079)	Report
Saturday, 5 May (1:45 pm)	Western Bulldogs 11.15 (81)	def.	Gold Coast 10.12 (72)	Mars Stadium (crowd: 6,833)	Report
Saturday, 5 May (2:10 pm)	Essendon 10.7 (67)	def. by	Hawthorn 13.12 (90)	MCG (crowd: 53,018)	Report
Saturday, 5 May (2:35 pm)	West Coast 16.6 (102)	def.	Port Adelaide 9.6 (60)	Optus Stadium (crowd: 50,516)	Report
Saturday, 5 May (7:25 pm)	Sydney 9.12 (66)	def. by	North Melbourne 9.14 (68)	SCG (crowd: 29,124)	Report
Saturday, 5 May (7:10 pm)	Adelaide 19.11 (125)	def.	Carlton 10.10 (70)	Adelaide Oval (crowd: 47,422)	Report
Sunday, 6 May (1:10 pm)	Richmond 15.20 (110)	def.	Fremantle 4.9 (33)	MCG (crowd: 43,240)	Report
Sunday, 6 May (3:20 pm)	St Kilda 9.13 (67)	def. by	Melbourne 16.10 (106)	Etihad Stadium (crowd: 25,496)	Report
Sunday, 6 May (4:40 pm)	Brisbane Lions 18.6 (114)	def. by	Collingwood 19.7 (121)	Gabba (crowd: 21,850)	Report

=== Round 8 ===
	Round 8
Friday, 11 May (7:50 pm)	Hawthorn 10.11 (71)	def. by	Sydney 12.7 (79)	MCG (crowd: 32,784)	Report
Saturday, 12 May (1:45 pm)	Greater Western Sydney 8.13 (61)	def. by	West Coast 12.14 (86)	Spotless Stadium (crowd: 9,253)	Report
Saturday, 12 May (2:10 pm)	Carlton 14.7 (91)	def.	Essendon 10.18 (78)	MCG (crowd: 44,669)	Report
Saturday, 12 May (4:35 pm)	Gold Coast 11.11 (77)	def. by	Melbourne 21.20 (146)	Gabba (crowd: 6,060)	Report
Saturday, 12 May (4:40 pm)	Port Adelaide 14.11 (95)	def.	Adelaide 14.6 (90)	Adelaide Oval (crowd: 50,967)	Report
Saturday, 12 May (7:25 pm)	Western Bulldogs 16.11 (107)	def.	Brisbane Lions 14.9 (93)	Etihad Stadium (crowd: 20,865)	Report
Saturday, 12 May (6:10 pm)	Fremantle 13.11 (89)	def.	St Kilda 8.11 (59)	Optus Stadium (crowd: 41,752)	Report
Sunday, 13 May (1:10 pm)	North Melbourne 11.6 (72)	def. by	Richmond 12.10 (82)	Etihad Stadium (crowd: 29,153)	Report
Sunday, 13 May (3:20 pm)	Collingwood 5.15 (45)	def. by	Geelong 9.12 (66)	MCG (crowd: 44,602)	Report
The crowd of 6,060 for the Gold Coast vs. Melbourne game, played in Brisbane away from Gold Coast’s normal home ground due to the ongoing restoration of Metricon Stadium after the Commonwealth Games, is the lowest attendance ever for a premiership match at the Gabba.

=== Round 9 ===
	Round 9
Friday, 18 May (7:20 pm)	Adelaide 9.9 (63)	def.	Western Bulldogs 2.14 (26)	Adelaide Oval (crowd: 39,407)	Report
Saturday, 19 May (1:45 pm)	North Melbourne 17.10 (112)	def.	Greater Western Sydney 9.15 (69)	Blundstone Arena (crowd: 7,194)	Report
Saturday, 19 May (1:15 pm)	Gold Coast 6.6 (42)	def. by	Port Adelaide 11.16 (82)	Jiangwan Stadium (crowd: 10,689)	Report
Saturday, 19 May (4:35 pm)	Essendon 12.12 (84)	def.	Geelong 7.8 (50)	MCG (crowd: 50,228)	Report
Saturday, 19 May (7:25 pm)	Sydney 17.9 (111)	def.	Fremantle 7.10 (52)	SCG (crowd: 27,481)	Report
Saturday, 19 May (7:25 pm)	St Kilda 10.12 (72)	def. by	Collingwood 15.10 (100)	Etihad Stadium (crowd: 33,994)	Report
Sunday, 20 May (1:10 pm)	Carlton 7.8 (50)	def. by	Melbourne 25.9 (159)	MCG (crowd: 44,142)	Report
Sunday, 20 May (3:20 pm)	Brisbane Lions 20.9 (129)	def.	Hawthorn 11.7 (73)	Gabba (crowd: 20,628)	Report
Sunday, 20 May (2:40 pm)	West Coast 20.10 (130)	def.	Richmond 12.11 (83)	Optus Stadium (crowd: 57,616)	Report
The Western Bulldogs' score of 2.14 (26) was the fewest goals kicked by the club in a match since round 12, 1965, and its lowest score since round 16, 1996.; Carlton suffered its worst ever defeat against Melbourne, losing by 109 points. It was Melbourne's greatest winning margin since round 21, 1993.; Lance Franklin became the second player to kick 300 goals for two different clubs (Hawthorn and Sydney), after Tony Lockett (St Kilda and Sydney).

=== Round 10 ===
	Round 10
Friday, 25 May (7:50 pm)	Collingwood 13.12 (90)	def.	Western Bulldogs 8.7 (55)	Etihad Stadium (crowd: 37,985)	Report
Saturday, 26 May (1:45 pm)	Richmond 15.15 (105)	def.	St Kilda 12.5 (77)	MCG (crowd: 48,850)	Report
Saturday, 26 May (4:35 pm)	Brisbane Lions 6.13 (49)	def. by	Sydney 10.7 (67)	Gabba (crowd: 18,702)	Report
Saturday, 26 May (7:25 pm)	Geelong 11.7 (73)	def.	Carlton 5.15 (45)	GMHBA Stadium (crowd: 31,090)	Report
Saturday, 26 May (7:25 pm)	Greater Western Sydney 8.12 (60)	def. by	Essendon 14.11 (95)	Spotless Stadium (crowd: 10,789)	Report
Sunday, 27 May (1:10 pm)	Hawthorn 9.6 (60)	def. by	West Coast 11.9 (75)	Etihad Stadium (crowd: 28,077)	Report
Sunday, 27 May (2:50 pm)	Melbourne 23.8 (146)	def.	Adelaide 8.7 (55)	TIO Traeger Park (crowd: 6,989)	Report
Sunday, 27 May (2:40 pm)	Fremantle 8.10 (58)	def. by	North Melbourne 12.14 (86)	Optus Stadium (crowd: 37,575)	Report
	Bye; Gold Coast, Port Adelaide
The Western Bulldogs' score of 0.4 (4) in the second half against Collingwood was the first time the club had been kept goalless in a half since round 12, 1991.

=== Round 11 ===
	Round 11 (Sir Doug Nicholls Round)
Friday, 1 June (7:50 pm)	Sydney 13.13 (91)	def.	Carlton 9.7 (61)	SCG (crowd: 27,351)	Report
Saturday, 2 June (1:45 pm)	Western Bulldogs 7.9 (51)	def. by	Melbourne 15.10 (100)	Etihad Stadium (crowd: 28,485)	Report
Saturday, 2 June (2:10 pm)	Hawthorn 9.10 (64)	def.	Port Adelaide 9.7 (61)	University of Tasmania Stadium (crowd: 13,007)	Report
Saturday, 2 June (4:35 pm)	Gold Coast 4.12 (36)	def. by	Geelong 17.19 (121)	Metricon Stadium (crowd: 17,490)	Report
Saturday, 2 June (7:25 pm)	Essendon 6.7 (43)	def. by	Richmond 17.12 (114)	MCG (crowd: 81,046)	Report
Saturday, 2 June (6:10 pm)	West Coast 16.5 (101)	def.	St Kilda 14.4 (88)	Optus Stadium (crowd: 54,188)	Report
Sunday, 3 June (1:10 pm)	North Melbourne 21.15 (141)	def.	Brisbane Lions 12.15 (87)	Etihad Stadium (crowd: 22,133)	Report
Sunday, 3 June (3:20 pm)	Collingwood 21.12 (138)	def.	Fremantle 12.5 (77)	MCG (crowd: 34,542)	Report
Sunday, 3 June (4:10 pm)	Adelaide 11.15 (81)	def. by	Greater Western Sydney 14.13 (97)	Adelaide Oval (crowd: 44,120)	Report

=== Round 12 ===
	Round 12
Friday, 8 June (7:20 pm)	Port Adelaide 10.12 (72)	def.	Richmond 8.10 (58)	Adelaide Oval (crowd: 39,936)	Report
Saturday, 9 June (1:45 pm)	Geelong 14.12 (96)	def.	North Melbourne 8.11 (59)	GMHBA Stadium (crowd: 31,265)	Report
Saturday, 9 June (4:35 pm)	Greater Western Sydney 20.14 (134)	def.	Gold Coast 4.2 (26)	Spotless Stadium (crowd: 7,131)	Report
Saturday, 9 June (7:25 pm)	St Kilda 7.13 (55)	def. by	Sydney 19.12 (126)	Etihad Stadium (crowd: 27,569)	Report
Sunday, 10 June (1:10 pm)	Brisbane Lions 8.14 (62)	def. by	Essendon 12.12 (84)	Gabba (crowd: 20,476)	Report
Sunday, 10 June (2:40 pm)	Fremantle 10.11 (71)	def.	Adelaide 9.14 (68)	Optus Stadium (crowd: 33,421)	Report
Monday, 11 June (3:20 pm)	Melbourne 14.7 (91)	def. by	Collingwood 20.13 (133)	MCG (crowd: 83,518)	Report
	Bye; Carlton, Hawthorn, West Coast, Western Bulldogs
Greater Western Sydney recorded a 108 point victory against Gold Coast, which was their biggest win in their history.; Gold Coast did not take a single mark inside its forward 50m arc during its loss to Greater Western Sydney, the first time this had occurred since the statistic was first kept in 1999.

=== Round 13 ===
	Round 13
Thursday, 14 June (7:20 pm)	Port Adelaide 20.12 (132)	def.	Western Bulldogs 11.9 (75)	Adelaide Oval (crowd: 26,137)	Report
Friday, 15 June (7:50 pm)	Sydney 10.12 (72)	def.	West Coast 7.15 (57)	SCG (crowd: 36,402)	Report
Saturday, 16 June (1:45 pm)	Carlton 6.10 (46)	def. by	Fremantle 15.13 (103)	Etihad Stadium (crowd: 21,430)	Report
Saturday, 16 June (4:35 pm)	Gold Coast 11.12 (78)	def. by	St Kilda 11.14 (80)	Metricon Stadium (crowd: 10,181)	Report
Saturday, 16 June (7:25 pm)	Hawthorn 12.16 (88)	def.	Adelaide 4.8 (32)	MCG (crowd: 26,693)	Report
Sunday, 17 June (3:20 pm)	Geelong 9.11 (65)	def. by	Richmond 12.11 (83)	MCG (crowd: 46,423)	Report
	Bye; Brisbane Lions, Collingwood, Essendon, Greater Western Sydney, Melbourne, North Melbourne

=== Round 14 ===
	Round 14
Thursday, 21 June (6:10 pm)	West Coast 6.16 (52)	def. by	Essendon 12.8 (80)	Optus Stadium (crowd: 51,409)	Report
Friday, 22 June (7:20 pm)	Port Adelaide 11.9 (75)	def.	Melbourne 9.11 (65)	Adelaide Oval (crowd: 40,751)	Report
Saturday, 23 June (1:45 pm)	Hawthorn 13.18 (96)	def.	Gold Coast 5.13 (43)	University of Tasmania Stadium (crowd: 9,007)	Report
Saturday, 23 June (4:35 pm)	Brisbane Lions 12.10 (82)	def. by	Greater Western Sydney 16.13 (109)	Gabba (crowd: 11,267)	Report
Saturday, 23 June (7:25 pm)	Western Bulldogs 11.9 (75)	def. by	North Melbourne 12.5 (77)	Etihad Stadium (crowd: 26,301)	Report
Sunday, 24 June (3:20 pm)	Collingwood 11.13 (79)	def.	Carlton 9.5 (59)	MCG (crowd: 53,706)	Report
	Bye; Adelaide, Fremantle, Geelong, Richmond, St Kilda, Sydney

=== Round 15 ===
	Round 15
Thursday, 28 June (7:20 pm)	Richmond 14.9 (93)	def.	Sydney 11.1 (67)	Etihad Stadium (crowd: 43,519)	Report
Friday, 29 June (7:50 pm)	Western Bulldogs 16.7 (103)	def.	Geelong 15.11 (101)	Etihad Stadium (crowd: 29,499)	Report
Saturday, 30 June (1:45 pm)	Carlton 10.9 (69)	def. by	Port Adelaide 13.12 (90)	MCG (crowd: 26,562)	Report
Saturday, 30 June (4:05 pm)	Adelaide 12.16 (88)	def.	West Coast 12.6 (78)	Adelaide Oval (crowd: 44,771)	Report
Saturday, 30 June (7:25 pm)	Gold Coast 8.12 (60)	def. by	Collingwood 14.15 (99)	Metricon Stadium (crowd: 13,637)	Report
Saturday, 30 June (7:25 pm)	Greater Western Sydney 13.17 (95)	def.	Hawthorn 13.6 (84)	Spotless Stadium (crowd: 10,866)	Report
Sunday, 1 July (1:10 pm)	Melbourne 18.9 (117)	def. by	St Kilda 18.11 (119)	MCG (crowd: 38,910)	Report
Sunday, 1 July (3:20 pm)	Essendon 19.11 (125)	def.	North Melbourne 16.12 (108)	Etihad Stadium (crowd: 45,580)	Report
Sunday, 1 July (2:40 pm)	Fremantle 9.10 (64)	def. by	Brisbane Lions 18.11 (119)	Optus Stadium (crowd: 41,674)	Report
Geelong's Harry Taylor had a chance to win the game after the siren against the Western Bulldogs, but missed to the left for a behind.

=== Round 16 ===
	Round 16
Thursday, 5 July (7:20 pm)	Sydney 9.5 (59)	def. by	Geelong 8.23 (71)	SCG (crowd: 34,363)	Report
Friday, 6 July (7:50 pm)	Richmond 15.13 (103)	def.	Adelaide 8.8 (56)	MCG (crowd: 54,934)	Report
Saturday, 7 July (1:45 pm)	Brisbane Lions 18.12 (120)	def.	Carlton 7.13 (55)	Gabba (crowd: 21,074)	Report
Saturday, 7 July (4:05 pm)	Port Adelaide 12.14 (86)	def.	St Kilda 7.8 (50)	Adelaide Oval (crowd: 36,253)	Report
Saturday, 7 July (7:25 pm)	Western Bulldogs 9.5 (59)	def. by	Hawthorn 19.8 (122)	Etihad Stadium (crowd: 35,320)	Report
Saturday, 7 July (7:10 pm)	Melbourne 13.24 (102)	def.	Fremantle 7.6 (48)	TIO Stadium (crowd: 8,689)	Report
Sunday, 8 July (1:10 pm)	North Melbourne 14.11 (95)	def.	Gold Coast 8.10 (58)	Etihad Stadium (crowd: 14,389)	Report
Sunday, 8 July (3:20 pm)	Essendon 9.8 (62)	def. by	Collingwood 12.6 (78)	MCG (crowd: 69,868)	Report
Sunday, 8 July (2:40 pm)	West Coast 13.8 (86)	def.	Greater Western Sydney 10.15 (75)	Optus Stadium (crowd: 52,105)	Report

=== Round 17 ===
	Round 17
Thursday, 12 July (7:20 pm)	Adelaide 16.16 (112)	def.	Geelong 14.13 (97)	Adelaide Oval (crowd: 46,095)	Report
Friday, 13 July (7:50 pm)	St Kilda 16.20 (116)	def.	Carlton 7.10 (52)	Etihad Stadium (crowd: 33,780)	Report
Saturday, 14 July (1:45 pm)	Hawthorn 9.11 (65)	def. by	Brisbane Lions 15.8 (98)	University of Tasmania Stadium (crowd: 12,557)	Report
Saturday, 14 July (4:35 pm)	Melbourne 18.11 (119)	def.	Western Bulldogs 10.9 (69)	MCG (crowd: 31,053)	Report
Saturday, 14 July (7:25 pm)	Gold Coast 6.15 (51)	def. by	Essendon 13.17 (95)	Metricon Stadium (crowd: 13,061)	Report
Saturday, 14 July (7:25 pm)	Greater Western Sydney 11.13 (79)	def.	Richmond 10.17 (77)	Spotless Stadium (crowd: 14,456)	Report
Sunday, 15 July (1:10 pm)	Collingwood 9.13 (67)	def. by	West Coast 15.12 (102)	MCG (crowd: 53,439)	Report
Sunday, 15 July (3:20 pm)	North Melbourne 15.8 (98)	def. by	Sydney 16.8 (104)	Etihad Stadium (crowd: 25,633)	Report
Sunday, 15 July (2:40 pm)	Fremantle 8.11 (59)	def.	Port Adelaide 7.8 (50)	Optus Stadium (crowd: 33,190)	Report
West Coast defeated Collingwood at the MCG for the first time since round 2, 1995, breaking a 10-game losing streak.

=== Round 18 ===
	Round 18
Friday, 20 July (7:50 pm)	St Kilda 8.9 (57)	def. by	Richmond 16.15 (111)	Etihad Stadium (crowd: 36,269)	Report
Saturday, 21 July (1:45 pm)	Collingwood 20.10 (130)	def.	North Melbourne 9.10 (64)	MCG (crowd: 50,393)	Report
Saturday, 21 July (2:10 pm)	Sydney 8.16 (64)	def. by	Gold Coast 12.16 (88)	SCG (crowd: 32,565)	Report
Saturday, 21 July (4:35 pm)	Essendon 13.21 (99)	def.	Fremantle 11.4 (70)	Etihad Stadium (crowd: 31,564)	Report
Saturday, 21 July (7:25 pm)	Brisbane Lions 13.10 (88)	def. by	Adelaide 13.15 (93)	Gabba (crowd: 20,475)	Report
Saturday, 21 July (7:25 pm)	Geelong 16.4 (100)	def.	Melbourne 14.14 (98)	GMHBA Stadium (crowd: 30,125)	Report
Sunday, 22 July (1:10 pm)	Carlton 7.10 (52)	def. by	Hawthorn 18.16 (124)	Etihad Stadium (crowd: 30,405)	Report
Sunday, 22 July (3:20 pm)	West Coast 14.16 (100)	def.	Western Bulldogs 6.10 (46)	Optus Stadium (crowd: 46,854)	Report
Sunday, 22 July (4:10 pm)	Port Adelaide 8.10 (58)	def. by	Greater Western Sydney 11.14 (80)	Adelaide Oval (crowd: 34,693)	Report
Zach Tuohy of Geelong kicked a goal after the final siren to defeat Melbourne.

=== Round 19 ===
	Round 19
Friday, 27 July (7:50 pm)	Essendon 15.19 (109)	def.	Sydney 10.6 (66)	Etihad Stadium (crowd: 42,251)	Report
Saturday, 28 July (1:45 pm)	Richmond 16.9 (105)	def.	Collingwood 12.5 (77)	MCG (crowd: 88,180)	Report
Saturday, 28 July (2:10 pm)	Geelong 18.12 (120)	def.	Brisbane Lions 11.12 (78)	GMHBA Stadium (crowd: 28,226)	Report
Saturday, 28 July (4:35 pm)	Greater Western Sydney 13.8 (86)	def.	St Kilda 8.13 (61)	Spotless Stadium (crowd: 12,014)	Report
Saturday, 28 July (7:25 pm)	Gold Coast 5.14 (44)	def. by	Carlton 12.7 (79)	Metricon Stadium (crowd: 10,776)	Report
Saturday, 28 July (7:10 pm)	Adelaide 10.17 (77)	def. by	Melbourne 13.12 (90)	Adelaide Oval (crowd: 45,880)	Report
Sunday, 29 July (1:10 pm)	North Melbourne 12.9 (81)	def.	West Coast 6.5 (41)	Blundstone Arena (crowd: 11,176)	Report
Sunday, 29 July (3:20 pm)	Western Bulldogs 5.4 (34)	def. by	Port Adelaide 11.12 (78)	Mars Stadium (crowd: 6,450)	Report
Sunday, 29 July (2:40 pm)	Fremantle 7.11 (53)	def. by	Hawthorn 17.10 (112)	Optus Stadium (crowd: 41,845)	Report
Richmond won their 18th consecutive match at the MCG, breaking the all time winning streak at the venue.

=== Round 20 ===
	Round 20
Friday, 3 August (7:50 pm)	Richmond 12.13 (85)	def.	Geelong 12.10 (82)	MCG (crowd: 67,054)	Report
Saturday, 4 August (1:45 pm)	Hawthorn 16.11 (107)	def.	Essendon 16.7 (103)	MCG (crowd: 68,857)	Report
Saturday, 4 August (2:10 pm)	Brisbane Lions 16.8 (104)	def. by	North Melbourne 16.11 (107)	Gabba (crowd: 18,395)	Report
Saturday, 4 August (4:05 pm)	Adelaide 13.18 (96)	def.	Port Adelaide 14.9 (93)	Adelaide Oval (crowd: 50,377)	Report
Saturday, 4 August (7:25 pm)	St Kilda 9.14 (68)	def. by	Western Bulldogs 15.13 (103)	Etihad Stadium (crowd: 20,748)	Report
Saturday, 4 August (7:25 pm)	Sydney 11.7 (73)	def.	Collingwood 10.11 (71)	SCG (crowd: 39,238)	Report
Sunday, 5 August (1:10 pm)	Carlton 7.4 (46)	def. by	Greater Western Sydney 23.13 (151)	Etihad Stadium (crowd: 16,697)	Report
Sunday, 5 August (3:20 pm)	Melbourne 21.17 (143)	def.	Gold Coast 7.5 (47)	MCG (crowd: 23,072)	Report
Sunday, 5 August (2:40 pm)	West Coast 21.16 (142)	def.	Fremantle 13.6 (84)	Optus Stadium (crowd: 57,375)	Report

=== Round 21 ===
	Round 21
Friday, 10 August (7:50 pm)	Essendon 18.14 (122)	def.	St Kilda 11.13 (79)	Etihad Stadium (crowd: 37,483)	Report
Saturday, 11 August (1:45 pm)	Hawthorn 10.11 (71)	def.	Geelong 8.12 (60)	MCG (crowd: 59,529)	Report
Saturday, 11 August (2:10 pm)	Gold Coast 7.9 (51)	def. by	Richmond 19.11 (125)	Metricon Stadium (crowd: 18,102)	Report
Saturday, 11 August (4:05 pm)	Port Adelaide 9.4 (58)	def. by	West Coast 9.8 (62)	Adelaide Oval (crowd: 32,534)	Report
Saturday, 11 August (7:25 pm)	Collingwood 14.20 (104)	def.	Brisbane Lions 11.7 (73)	Etihad Stadium (crowd: 33,390)	Report
Saturday, 11 August (7:25 pm)	Greater Western Sydney 15.16 (106)	def.	Adelaide 13.14 (92)	Manuka Oval (crowd: 13,249)	Report
Sunday, 12 August (1:10 pm)	North Melbourne 12.13 (85)	def. by	Western Bulldogs 13.14 (92)	Etihad Stadium (crowd: 27,031)	Report
Sunday, 12 August (3:20 pm)	Melbourne 10.18 (78)	def. by	Sydney 13.9 (87)	MCG (crowd: 51,424)	Report
Sunday, 12 August (2:40 pm)	Fremantle 15.11 (101)	def.	Carlton 10.12 (72)	Optus Stadium (crowd: 40,028)	Report
Jeremy McGovern (West Coast) kicked a goal after the final siren to defeat Port Adelaide.; The Western Bulldogs had three separate players, Lachie Hunter (44), Jack Macrae, Caleb Daniel (both 40) that each recorded 40 disposals or more in its win over North Melbourne, the first time a team had achieved this ever in a match.

=== Round 22 ===
	Round 22
Friday, 17 August (7:50 pm)	Richmond 12.9 (81)	def.	Essendon 11.7 (73)	MCG (crowd: 76,424)	Report
Saturday, 18 August (1:45 pm)	Collingwood 17.13 (115)	def.	Port Adelaide 10.4 (64)	MCG (crowd: 46,286)	Report
Saturday, 18 August (2:10 pm)	Geelong 24.14 (158)	def.	Fremantle 3.7 (25)	GMHBA Stadium (crowd: 24,507)	Report
Saturday, 18 August (4:35 pm)	Greater Western Sydney 8.12 (60)	def. by	Sydney 11.14 (80)	Spotless Stadium (crowd: 21,433)	Report
Saturday, 18 August (7:25 pm)	Gold Coast 11.8 (74)	def. by	Brisbane Lions 10.18 (78)	Metricon Stadium (crowd: 11,907)	Report
Saturday, 18 August (7:25 pm)	St Kilda 11.10 (76)	def. by	Hawthorn 12.8 (80)	Etihad Stadium (crowd: 24,795)	Report
Sunday, 19 August (1:10 pm)	Carlton 7.7 (49)	def. by	Western Bulldogs 10.6 (66)	Etihad Stadium (crowd: 24,143)	Report
Sunday, 19 August (1:20 pm)	West Coast 14.7 (91)	def. by	Melbourne 16.12 (108)	Optus Stadium (crowd: 55,824)	Report
Sunday, 19 August (4:10 pm)	Adelaide 12.14 (86)	def.	North Melbourne 11.11 (77)	Adelaide Oval (crowd: 41,444)	Report
Fremantle suffered its heaviest ever loss, losing by 133 points.; Matt Crouch (Adelaide) recorded 35 handballs against North Melbourne, the most ever recorded in any match.

=== Round 23 ===
	Round 23
Friday, 24 August (7:20 pm)	Port Adelaide 13.11 (89)	def. by	Essendon 17.9 (111)	Adelaide Oval (crowd: 39,168)	Report
Saturday, 25 August (1:45 pm)	Geelong 22.10 (142)	def.	Gold Coast 5.10 (40)	GMHBA Stadium (crowd: 28,004)	Report
Saturday, 25 August (2:10 pm)	Richmond 15.8 (98)	def.	Western Bulldogs 14.11 (95)	MCG (crowd: 56,998)	Report
Saturday, 25 August (2:35 pm)	Fremantle 9.13 (67)	def. by	Collingwood 11.10 (76)	Optus Stadium (crowd: 41,320)	Report
Saturday, 25 August (7:25 pm)	Carlton 8.13 (61)	def. by	Adelaide 26.9 (165)	Etihad Stadium (crowd: 17,000)	Report
Saturday, 25 August (7:25 pm)	Sydney 10.14 (74)	def. by	Hawthorn 12.11 (83)	SCG (crowd: 39,660)	Report
Sunday, 26 August (1:10 pm)	Brisbane Lions 11.6 (72)	def. by	West Coast 14.14 (98)	Gabba (crowd: 16,367)	Report
Sunday, 26 August (3:20 pm)	Melbourne 15.12 (102)	def.	Greater Western Sydney 8.9 (57)	MCG (crowd: 37,285)	Report
Sunday, 26 August (4:40 pm)	St Kilda 14.10 (94)	def. by	North Melbourne 17.15 (117)	Etihad Stadium (crowd: 19,866)	Report
Carlton suffered its worst ever defeat against Adelaide, losing by 104 points.

=== Season notes ===
- Carlton lost its first seven matches, the longest losing streak to start a season in the club's history.
- Carlton's total of two wins for the season was the club's fewest wins in a season since 1901.
- Melbourne qualified for the finals for the first time since 2006.

== Win/loss table ==
Team	1	2	3	4	5	6	7	8	9	10	11	12	13	14	15	16	17	18	19	20	21	22	23	F1	F2	F3	GF	Ladder
Adelaide	Ess; 12	**Rich**; **36**	StK; 49	**Coll**; **48**	Syd; 10	**GCS**; **48**	**Carl**; **55**	PA; 5	**WB**; **37**	Melb; 91	**GWS**; **16**	Frem; 3	Haw; 56	X	**WCE**; **10**	Rich; 47	**Geel**; **15**	BL; 5	**Melb**; **13**	**PA**; **3**	GWS; 14	**NM**; **9**	Carl; 104	X	X	X	X	12
Brisbane Lions	StK; 25	**Melb**; **26**	PA; 5	Rich; 93	**GCS**; **5**	GWS; 34	**Coll**; **7**	WB; 14	**Haw**; **56**	**Syd**; **18**	NM; 54	**Ess**; **22**	X	**GWS**; **27**	Frem; 55	**Carl**; **65**	Haw; 33	**Adel**; **5**	Geel; 42	**NM**; **3**	Coll; 31	GCS; 4	**WCE**; **26**	X	X	X	X	15
Carlton	Rich; 26	**GCS**; **34**	**Coll**; **24**	NM; 86	**WCE**; **10**	WB; 21	Adel; 55	**Ess**; **13**	**Melb**; **109**	Geel; 28	Syd; 30	X	**Frem**; **57**	Coll; 20	**PA**; **21**	BL; 65	StK; 64	**Haw**; **72**	GCS; 35	**GWS**; **105**	Frem; 29	**WB**; **17**	**Adel**; **104**	X	X	X	X	18
Collingwood	Haw; 34	**GWS**; **16**	Carl; 24	Adel; 48	**Ess**; **49**	**Rich**; **43**	BL; 7	**Geel**; **21**	StK; 28	**WB**; **35**	**Frem**; **61**	Melb; 42	X	**Carl**; **20**	GCS; 39	Ess; 16	**WCE**; **35**	**NM**; **66**	Rich; 28	Syd; 2	**BL**; **31**	**PA**; **51**	Frem; 9	WCE; 16	**GWS**; **10**	Rich; 39	WCE; 5	**3**
Essendon	**Adel**; **12**	Frem; 16	WB; 21	**PA**; **22**	Coll; 49	**Melb**; **36**	**Haw**; **23**	Carl; 13	**Geel**; **34**	GWS; 35	**Rich**; **71**	BL; 22	X	WCE; 28	**NM**; **17**	**Coll**; **16**	GCS; 44	**Frem**; **29**	**Syd**; **43**	Haw; 4	**StK**; **43**	Rich; 8	PA; 22	X	X	X	X	11
Fremantle	PA; 50	**Ess**; **16**	GCS; 28	GWS; 31	**WB**; **54**	**WCE**; **8**	Rich; 77	**StK**; **30**	Syd; 59	**NM**; **28**	Coll; 61	**Adel**; **3**	Carl; 57	X	**BL**; **55**	Melb; 54	**PA**; **9**	Ess; 29	**Haw**; **59**	WCE; 58	**Carl**; **29**	Geel; 133	**Coll**; **9**	X	X	X	X	14
Geelong	Melb; 3	**Haw**; **1**	WCE; 15	**StK**; **47**	PA; 34	**Syd**; **17**	**GWS**; **61**	Coll; 21	Ess; 34	**Carl**; **28**	GCS; 85	**NM**; **37**	**Rich**; **18**	X	WB; 2	Syd; 12	Adel; 15	**Melb**; **2**	**BL**; **42**	Rich; 3	Haw; 11	**Frem**; **133**	**GCS**; **102**	Melb; 29	X	X	X	**8**
Gold Coast	**NM**; **16**	Carl; 34	**Frem**; **28**	WCE; 80	BL; 5	Adel; 48	WB; 9	**Melb**; **69**	**PA**; **40**	X	**Geel**; **85**	GWS; 108	**StK**; **2**	Haw; 53	**Coll**; **39**	NM; 37	**Ess**; **44**	Syd; 24	**Carl**; **35**	Melb; 96	**Rich**; **74**	**BL**; **4**	Geel; 102	X	X	X	X	17
Greater Western Sydney	**WB**; **82**	Coll; 16	Syd; 16	**Frem**; **31**	StK; 0	**BL**; **34**	Geel; 61	**WCE**; **25**	NM; 43	**Ess**; **35**	Adel; 16	**GCS**; **108**	X	BL; 27	**Haw**; **11**	WCE; 11	**Rich**; **2**	PA; 22	**StK**; **25**	Carl; 105	**Adel**; **13**	**Syd**; **20**	Melb; 45	Syd; 49	Coll; 10	X	X	**7**
Hawthorn	**Coll**; **34**	Geel; 1	Rich; 13	**Melb**; **67**	NM; 28	**StK**; **35**	Ess; 23	**Syd**; **8**	BL; 56	**WCE**; **15**	**PA**; **3**	X	**Adel**; **56**	**GCS**; **53**	GWS; 11	WB; 63	**BL**; **33**	Carl; 72	Frem; 59	**Ess**; **4**	**Geel**; **11**	StK; 4	Syd; 9	Rich; 31	**Melb**; **33**	X	X	**4**
Melbourne	**Geel**; **3**	BL; 26	**NM**; **37**	Haw; 67	**Rich**; **46**	Ess; 36	StK; 39	GCS; 69	Carl; 109	**Adel**; **91**	WB; 49	**Coll**; **42**	X	PA; 10	**StK**; **2**	**Frem**; **54**	**WB**; **50**	Geel; 2	Adel; 13	**GCS**; **96**	**Syd**; **9**	WCE; 17	**GWS**; **45**	**Geel**; **29**	Haw; 33	WCE; 66	X	**5**
North Melbourne	GCS; 16	**StK**; **52**	Melb; 37	**Carl**; **86**	**Haw**; **28**	**PA**; **33**	Syd; 2	**Rich**; **10**	**GWS**; **43**	Frem; 28	**BL**; **54**	Geel; 37	X	WB; 2	Ess; 17	**GCS**; **37**	**Syd**; **6**	Coll; 66	**WCE**; **40**	BL; 3	**WB**; **7**	Adel; 9	StK; 23	X	X	X	X	9
Port Adelaide	**Frem**; **50**	Syd; 23	**BL**; **5**	Ess; 22	**Geel**; **34**	NM; 33	WCE; 42	**Adel**; **5**	GCS; 40	X	Haw; 3	**Rich**; **14**	**WB**; **57**	**Melb**; **10**	Carl; 21	**StK**; **36**	Frem; 9	**GWS**; **22**	WB; 44	Adel; 3	**WCE**; **4**	Coll; 51	**Ess**; **22**	X	X	X	X	10
Richmond	**Carl**; **26**	Adel; 36	**Haw**; **13**	**BL**; **93**	Melb; 46	Coll; 43	**Frem**; **77**	NM; 10	WCE; 47	**StK**; **28**	Ess; 71	PA; 14	Geel; 18	X	**Syd**; **26**	**Adel**; **47**	GWS; 2	StK; 54	**Coll**; **28**	**Geel**; **3**	GCS; 74	**Ess**; **8**	**WB**; **3**	**Haw**; **31**	X	**Coll**; **39**	X	**1**
St Kilda	**BL**; **25**	NM; 52	**Adel**; **49**	Geel; 47	**GWS**; **0**	Haw; 35	**Melb**; **39**	Frem; 30	**Coll**; **28**	Rich; 28	WCE; 13	**Syd**; **71**	GCS; 2	X	Melb; 2	PA; 36	**Carl**; **64**	**Rich**; **54**	GWS; 25	**WB**; **35**	Ess; 43	**Haw**; **4**	**NM**; **23**	X	X	X	X	16
Sydney	WCE; 29	**PA**; **23**	**GWS**; **16**	WB; 7	**Adel**; **10**	Geel; 17	**NM**; **2**	Haw; 8	**Frem**; **59**	BL; 18	**Carl**; **30**	StK; 71	**WCE**; **15**	X	Rich; 26	**Geel**; **12**	NM; 6	**GCS**; **24**	Ess; 43	**Coll**; **2**	Melb; 9	GWS; 20	**Haw**; **9**	**GWS**; **49**	X	X	X	**6**
West Coast	**Syd**; **29**	WB; 51	**Geel**; **15**	**GCS**; **80**	Carl; 10	Frem; 8	**PA**; **42**	GWS; 25	**Rich**; **47**	Haw; 15	**StK**; **13**	X	Syd; 15	**Ess**; **28**	Adel; 10	**GWS**; **11**	Coll; 35	**WB**; **54**	NM; 40	**Frem**; **58**	PA; 4	**Melb**; **17**	BL; 26	**Coll**; **16**	X	**Melb**; **66**	**Coll**; **5**	**2** **(P)**
Western Bulldogs	GWS; 82	**WCE**; **51**	**Ess**; **21**	**Syd**; **7**	Frem; 54	**Carl**; **21**	**GCS**; **9**	**BL**; **14**	Adel; 37	Coll; 35	**Melb**; **49**	X	PA; 57	**NM**; **2**	**Geel**; **2**	**Haw**; **63**	Melb; 50	WCE; 54	**PA**; **44**	StK; 35	NM; 7	Carl; 17	Rich; 3	X	X	X	X	13
Team	1	2	3	4	5	6	7	8	9	10	11	12	13	14	15	16	17	18	19	20	21	22	23	F1	F2	F3	GF	Ladder

+	Win	Qualified for finals
−	Loss	Eliminated

Bold – Home game
X – Bye
Opponent for round listed above margin

== Ladder ==
Pos	Team	Pld	W	L	D	PF	PA	PP	Pts	Qualification
1	Richmond	22	18	4	0	2143	1574	136.1	72	2018 finals
2	West Coast (P)	22	16	6	0	2012	1657	121.4	64	2018 finals
3	Collingwood	22	15	7	0	2046	1699	120.4	60	2018 finals
4	Hawthorn	22	15	7	0	1972	1642	120.1	60	2018 finals
5	Melbourne	22	14	8	0	2299	1749	131.4	56	2018 finals
6	Sydney	22	14	8	0	1822	1664	109.5	56	2018 finals
7	Greater Western Sydney	22	13	8	1	1898	1661	114.3	54	2018 finals
8	Geelong	22	13	9	0	2045	1554	131.6	52	2018 finals
9	North Melbourne	22	12	10	0	1950	1790	108.9	48	
10	Port Adelaide	22	12	10	0	1780	1654	107.6	48	
11	Essendon	22	12	10	0	1932	1838	105.1	48	
12	Adelaide	22	12	10	0	1941	1865	104.1	48	
13	Western Bulldogs	22	8	14	0	1575	2037	77.3	32	
14	Fremantle	22	8	14	0	1556	2041	76.2	32	
15	Brisbane Lions	22	5	17	0	1825	2049	89.1	20	
16	St Kilda	22	4	17	1	1606	2125	75.6	18	
17	Gold Coast	22	4	18	0	1308	2182	59.9	16	
18	Carlton	22	2	20	0	1353	2282	59.3	8	

Source: AFL
Rules for classification: 1) points; 2) percentage; 3) number of points for.
(P) Premiers

=== Ladder progression ===
- Numbers highlighted in green indicates the team finished the round inside the top 8.
- Numbers highlighted in blue indicates the team finished in first place on the ladder in that round.
- Numbers highlighted in red indicates the team finished in last place on the ladder in that round.
- Underlined numbers indicates the team had a bye during that round.
- Subscript numbers indicate ladder position at round's end.

	Team	1	2	3	4	5	6	7	8	9	10	11	12	13	14	15	16	17	18	19	20	21	22	23
1	Richmond	4_{7}	4_{12}	8_{9}	12_{3}	16_{1}	20_{1}	24_{1}	28_{1}	28_{2}	32_{2}	36_{2}	36_{2}	40_{1}	40_{1}	44_{1}	48_{1}	48_{1}	52_{1}	56_{1}	60_{1}	64_{1}	68_{1}	72_{1}
2	West Coast	0_{14}	4_{8}	8_{5}	12_{2}	16_{2}	20_{2}	24_{2}	28_{2}	32_{1}	36_{1}	40_{1}	40_{1}	40_{2}	40_{3}	40_{3}	44_{3}	48_{2}	52_{2}	52_{2}	56_{2}	60_{2}	60_{2}	64_{2}
3	Collingwood	0_{16}	0_{16}	4_{14}	8_{10}	12_{5}	12_{10}	16_{9}	16_{11}	20_{10}	24_{8}	28_{7}	32_{6}	32_{6}	36_{4}	40_{2}	44_{2}	44_{3}	48_{3}	48_{3}	48_{6}	52_{5}	56_{3}	60_{3}
4	Hawthorn	4_{3}	8_{4}	8_{8}	12_{4}	12_{7}	16_{4}	20_{4}	20_{5}	20_{9}	20_{10}	24_{10}	24_{11}	28_{9}	32_{9}	32_{10}	36_{8}	36_{10}	40_{8}	44_{7}	48_{5}	52_{4}	56_{4}	60_{4}
5	Melbourne	0_{10}	4_{6}	8_{4}	8_{12}	8_{14}	12_{12}	16_{10}	20_{6}	24_{3}	28_{3}	32_{3}	32_{5}	32_{4}	32_{6}	32_{7}	36_{6}	40_{6}	40_{7}	44_{6}	48_{4}	48_{7}	52_{7}	56_{5}
6	Sydney	4_{5}	4_{9}	8_{7}	12_{6}	12_{10}	16_{7}	16_{8}	20_{7}	24_{5}	28_{4}	32_{4}	36_{3}	40_{3}	40_{2}	40_{4}	40_{5}	44_{4}	44_{4}	44_{9}	48_{8}	52_{6}	56_{5}	56_{6}
7	Greater Western Sydney	4_{1}	8_{1}	8_{2}	12_{1}	14_{3}	18_{3}	18_{5}	18_{9}	18_{11}	18_{11}	22_{11}	26_{9}	26_{10}	30_{10}	34_{6}	34_{10}	38_{7}	42_{6}	46_{5}	50_{3}	54_{3}	54_{6}	54_{7}
8	Geelong	4_{9}	4_{10}	4_{12}	8_{8}	12_{6}	12_{9}	16_{6}	20_{3}	20_{8}	24_{6}	28_{5}	32_{4}	32_{5}	32_{7}	32_{8}	36_{7}	36_{8}	40_{8}	44_{8}	44_{9}	44_{9}	48_{8}	52_{8}
9	North Melbourne	0_{15}	4_{5}	4_{11}	8_{7}	12_{4}	12_{8}	16_{7}	16_{10}	20_{7}	24_{5}	28_{6}	28_{7}	28_{8}	32_{8}	32_{9}	36_{9}	36_{9}	36_{10}	40_{10}	44_{10}	44_{10}	44_{10}	48_{9}
10	Port Adelaide	4_{2}	8_{2}	12_{1}	12_{5}	12_{9}	16_{6}	16_{11}	20_{8}	24_{6}	24_{9}	24_{8}	28_{8}	32_{7}	36_{5}	40_{5}	44_{4}	44_{5}	44_{5}	48_{4}	48_{7}	48_{8}	48_{9}	48_{10}
11	Essendon	4_{8}	4_{11}	4_{13}	8_{11}	8_{13}	8_{14}	8_{15}	8_{15}	12_{14}	16_{12}	16_{12}	20_{12}	20_{13}	24_{12}	28_{12}	28_{12}	32_{12}	36_{11}	40_{11}	40_{11}	44_{11}	44_{11}	48_{11}
12	Adelaide	0_{11}	4_{7}	8_{3}	8_{9}	12_{8}	16_{5}	20_{3}	20_{4}	24_{4}	24_{7}	24_{9}	24_{10}	24_{11}	24_{11}	28_{11}	28_{11}	32_{11}	36_{12}	36_{12}	40_{12}	40_{12}	44_{12}	48_{12}
13	Western Bulldogs	0_{18}	0_{18}	4_{16}	4_{15}	4_{16}	8_{15}	12_{14}	16_{13}	16_{13}	16_{14}	16_{14}	16_{14}	16_{14}	16_{14}	20_{14}	20_{14}	20_{14}	20_{14}	20_{14}	24_{14}	28_{14}	32_{13}	32_{13}
14	Fremantle	0_{17}	4_{14}	8_{10}	8_{13}	12_{11}	12_{11}	12_{12}	16_{12}	16_{12}	16_{13}	16_{13}	20_{13}	24_{12}	24_{13}	24_{13}	24_{13}	28_{13}	28_{13}	28_{13}	28_{13}	32_{13}	32_{14}	32_{14}
15	Brisbane Lions	0_{13}	0_{15}	0_{17}	0_{17}	0_{17}	0_{17}	0_{17}	0_{18}	4_{17}	4_{17}	4_{17}	4_{17}	4_{17}	4_{17}	8_{17}	12_{16}	16_{16}	16_{16}	16_{16}	16_{16}	16_{16}	20_{15}	20_{15}
16	St Kilda	4_{6}	4_{13}	4_{15}	4_{16}	6_{15}	6_{16}	6_{16}	6_{16}	6_{16}	6_{16}	6_{16}	6_{16}	10_{16}	10_{16}	14_{15}	14_{15}	18_{15}	18_{15}	18_{15}	18_{15}	18_{16}	18_{16}	18_{16}
17	Gold Coast	4_{4}	8_{3}	8_{6}	8_{14}	12_{12}	12_{13}	12_{13}	12_{14}	12_{15}	12_{15}	12_{15}	12_{15}	12_{15}	12_{15}	12_{16}	12_{17}	12_{17}	16_{17}	16_{17}	16_{17}	16_{17}	16_{17}	16_{17}
18	Carlton	0_{12}	0_{17}	0_{18}	0_{18}	0_{18}	0_{18}	0_{18}	4_{17}	4_{18}	4_{18}	4_{18}	4_{18}	4_{18}	4_{18}	4_{18}	4_{18}	4_{18}	4_{18}	8_{18}	8_{18}	8_{18}	8_{18}	8_{18}

=== Positions of teams round by round ===
View source data.

== Finals series ==
Qualifying and elimination finals
Sep 6, MCG
1	Richmond	13.17 (95)
4	Hawthorn	9.10 (64)
Sep 7, MCG
5	Melbourne	10.15 (75)
8	Geelong	6.10 (46)
Sep 8, SCG
6	Sydney	4.6 (30)
7	Greater Western Sydney	10.19 (79)
Sep 8, Optus Stadium
2	West Coast	12.14 (86)
3	Collingwood	10.10 (70)

Semi-finals
Sep 14, MCG
Hawthorn	10.11 (71)
Melbourne	16.8 (104)
Sep 15, MCG
Collingwood	9.15 (69)
Greater Western Sydney	9.5 (59)

Preliminary finals
Sep 21, MCG
Richmond	8.10 (58)
Collingwood	15.7 (97)
Sep 22, Optus Stadium
West Coast	18.13 (121)
Melbourne	7.13 (55)

Grand final
29 Sep, MCG
West Coast	11.13 (79)
Collingwood	11.8 (74)

=== Week one ===
	Qualifying finals
QF1: Thursday, 6 September (7:20 pm)	Richmond 13.17 (95)	def.	Hawthorn 9.10 (64)	MCG (crowd: 91,446)	Report
QF2: Saturday, 8 September (6:10 pm)	West Coast 12.14 (86)	def.	Collingwood 10.10 (70)	Optus Stadium (crowd: 59,585)	Report

	Elimination finals
EF1: Friday, 7 September (7:50 pm)	Melbourne 10.15 (75)	def.	Geelong 6.10 (46)	MCG (crowd: 91,767)	Report
EF2: Saturday, 8 September (4:20 pm)	Sydney 4.6 (30)	def. by	Greater Western Sydney 10.19 (79)	SCG (crowd: 40,350)	Report
Sydney's score of 4.6 (30) was its lowest ever score at the SCG.; The crowd of 91,767 between Melbourne and Geelong was the highest crowd for a Melbourne game since the 2000 AFL Grand Final.

=== Week two ===
	Semi-finals
SF1: Friday, 14 September (7:50 pm)	Hawthorn 10.11 (71)	def. by	Melbourne 16.8 (104)	MCG (crowd: 90,152)	Report
SF2: Saturday, 15 September (7:25 pm)	Collingwood 9.15 (69)	def.	Greater Western Sydney 9.5 (59)	MCG (crowd: 72,504)	Report

=== Week three ===
	Preliminary finals
PF1: Friday, 21 September (7:50 pm)	Richmond 8.10 (58)	def. by	Collingwood 15.7 (97)	MCG (crowd: 94,959)	Report
PF2: Saturday, 22 September (1:20 pm)	West Coast 18.13 (121)	def.	Melbourne 7.13 (55)	Optus Stadium (crowd: 59,608)	Report
Melbourne became the first side since Richmond in the 1927 Grand Final to not score a goal in the first half of a final.; Collingwood's victory ended Richmond's record 22-game winning streak at the MCG, which dated back to round 13, 2017.

=== Week four ===
	Grand final
Saturday, 29 September (2:30 pm)	West Coast 11.13 (79)	def.	Collingwood 11.8 (74)	MCG (crowd: 100,022)	Report

=== Finals notes ===
- Melbourne qualified for a preliminary final for the first time since 2000, and qualified for the finals for the first time since 2006.
- Collingwood qualified for the grand final for the first time since 2011, and qualified for the finals for the first time since 2013.

== Attendances ==
=== By club ===
2018 AFL attendances
Club	Total	Games	Avg. per game	Home total	Home games	Home avg.
Adelaide	823,674	22	37,440	499,589	11	45,417
Brisbane Lions	476,224	22	21,647	202,462	11	18,406
Carlton	753,080	22	34,231	349,521	11	31,775
Collingwood	1,339,628	26	53,585	548,881	11	49,898
Essendon	1,026,731	22	46,670	520,918	11	47,356
Fremantle	791,299	22	35,968	459,403	11	41,764
Geelong	970,928	23	44,133	376,282	11	34,207
Gold Coast	410,735	22	18,670	149,013	11	13,547
Greater Western Sydney	552,949	24	26,510	131,047	11	11,913
Hawthorn	976,282	24	40,678	366,276	11	33,298
Melbourne	1,061,009	25	42,440	447,641	11	40,695
North Melbourne	569,722	22	25,896	230,539	11	20,958
Port Adelaide	740,728	22	33,669	420,498	11	38,227
Richmond	1,381,298	24	57,554	672,921	11	61,175
St Kilda	637,204	22	28,964	280,528	11	25,503
Sydney	789,860	23	34,342	373,548	11	33,959
West Coast	1,044,250	25	43,510	585,749	11	53,250
Western Bulldogs	642,959	22	29,225	279,093	11	25,372

=== By ground ===
2018 ground attendances
Ground	Total	Games	Avg. per game
Adelaide Arena at Jiangwan Stadium	10,689	1	10,689
Adelaide Oval	920,077	22	41,822
Blundstone Arena	32,636	3	10,879
Cazalys Stadium	3,722	1	3,722
Etihad Stadium	1,291,670	45	28,704
Gabba	208,522	12	17,377
GMHBA Stadium	256,670	9	28,519
Mars Stadium	13,283	2	6,642
MCG	2,853,179	50	57,064
Metricon Stadium	95,154	7	13,593
Optus Stadium	1,197,733	25	47,909
SCG	413,898	12	34,492
Spotless Stadium	95,988	8	11,999
TIO Stadium	8,689	1	8,689
TIO Traeger Park	6,989	1	6,989
University of Tasmania Stadium	50,312	4	12,578
UNSW Canberra Oval	35,059	3	11,686

== Awards ==
- The Brownlow Medal was awarded to Tom Mitchell of Hawthorn who polled 28 votes.
- The Coleman Medal was awarded to Jack Riewoldt of Richmond, who kicked 65 goals during the home and away season. It was the third time Riewoldt has won the award.
- The Ron Evans Medal was awarded to Jaidyn Stephenson of Collingwood, who received 52 votes.
- The Norm Smith Medal was awarded to Luke Shuey of West Coast.
- The AFL Goal of the Year was awarded to Jack Higgins of Richmond for his goal against Collingwood in round 19.
- The AFL Mark of the Year was awarded to Isaac Heeney of Sydney for his mark against Melbourne in round 21.
- The McClelland Trophy was awarded to Richmond for the first time since 1982.
- The wooden spoon was "awarded" to Carlton for the first time since 2015 after obtaining a club low two wins during the season.
- The AFL Players Association Awards:
  - The Leigh Matthews Trophy was awarded to Tom Mitchell of Hawthorn polling 773 votes ahead of Patrick Cripps who polled 529.
  - The Robert Rose Award was awarded to Callan Ward of Greater Western Sydney.
  - The best captain was awarded to Trent Cotchin of Richmond.
  - The best first year player was awarded to Tim Kelly of Geelong.
  - The 22under22 team captaincy was awarded to Marcus Bontempelli of the Western Bulldogs for the third year in a row.
- The AFL Coaches Association Awards:
  - The AFL Coaches Association Player of the Year Award was awarded to Max Gawn of Melbourne who received 97 votes ahead of Patrick Cripps who received 91.
  - The Gary Ayres Award for the best player in the finals series was awarded to Steele Sidebottom of Collingwood who polled 23 votes ahead of teammate Taylor Adams on 18.
  - The Allan Jeans Senior Coach of the Year Award was awarded to Collingwood coach Nathan Buckley.
  - The Assistant Coach of the Year Award was awarded to North Melbourne assistant Rhyce Shaw for the second year in a row.
  - The Lifetime Achievement Award was awarded to Alan Stewart for his contribution to football in South Australia.
  - The Best Young Player Award was awarded to Tom Stewart of Geelong who received 40 votes.
  - The Media Award was awarded to Gerard Whateley for the fifth consecutive year.
- The Jim Stynes Community Leadership Award was awarded to Neville Jetta of Melbourne.

=== Milestones ===
Name	Club	Milestone	Round	Ref.
Joel Selwood	Geelong	250 AFL games	Round 1	
Trent Cotchin	Richmond	200 AFL games	Round 2	
Mark LeCras	West Coast	200 AFL games	Round 4	
Sam Gilbert	St Kilda	200 AFL games	Round 6	
Callan Ward	Greater Western Sydney	200 AFL games	Round 8	
Nick Smith	Sydney	200 AFL games	Round 9	
Shaun Grigg	Richmond	200 AFL games	Round 10	
Todd Goldstein	North Melbourne	200 AFL games	Round 10	
Dan Hannebery	Sydney	200 AFL games	Round 11	
Nathan Jones	Melbourne	250 AFL games	Round 11	
Ryan Griffen	Greater Western Sydney	250 AFL games	Round 12	
Heath Grundy	Sydney	250 AFL games	Round 13	
Shaun Burgoyne	Hawthorn	350 AFL games	Round 13	
Kade Simpson	Carlton	300 AFL games	Round 15	
Stephen Hill	Fremantle	200 AFL games	Round 16	
Steele Sidebottom	Collingwood	200 AFL games	Round 16	
James Frawley	Hawthorn	200 AFL games	Round 17	
Lance Franklin	Sydney	900 AFL goals	Round 17	
Jordan Lewis	Melbourne	300 AFL games	Round 19	
Shaun Higgins	North Melbourne	200 AFL games	Round 19	
Bryce Gibbs	Adelaide	250 AFL games	Round 20	
David Mackay	Adelaide	200 AFL games	Round 21	
Dale Morris	Western Bulldogs	250 AFL games	Round 21	
Travis Varcoe	Collingwood	200 AFL games	Round 22	
Jack Riewoldt	Richmond	600 AFL goals	Round 23	

=== Coleman Medal ===
- Numbers highlighted in blue indicates the player led the Coleman Medal at the end of that round.
- Numbers underlined indicates the player did not play in that round.

	Player	1	2	3	4	5	6	7	8	9	10	11	12	13	14	15	16	17	18	19	20	21	22	23	Total
1	Jack Riewoldt	4_{4}	0_{4}	4_{8}	1_{9}	2_{11}	3_{14}	3_{17}	2_{19}	5_{24}	0_{24}	1_{25}	3_{28}	2_{30}	0_{30}	3_{33}	2_{35}	2_{37}	4_{41}	3_{44}	4_{48}	10_{58}	2_{60}	5_{65}	65
2	Ben Brown	0_{0}	6_{6}	4_{10}	5_{15}	4_{19}	4_{23}	1_{24}	2_{26}	5_{31}	2_{33}	2_{35}	0_{35}	0_{35}	5_{40}	2_{42}	4_{46}	4_{50}	2_{52}	1_{53}	1_{54}	4_{58}	0_{58}	3_{61}	61
3	Tom Hawkins	0_{0}	1_{1}	3_{4}	0_{4}	0_{4}	2_{6}	4_{10}	0_{10}	3_{13}	3_{16}	3_{19}	3_{22}	3_{25}	0_{25}	3_{28}	5_{33}	4_{37}	7_{44}	7_{51}	1_{52}	1_{53}	6_{59}	2_{61}	61
4	Lance Franklin	8_{8}	4_{12}	2_{14}	3_{17}	1_{18}	0_{18}	0_{18}	0_{18}	3_{21}	1_{22}	3_{25}	4_{29}	2_{31}	0_{31}	4_{35}	4_{39}	3_{42}	0_{42}	2_{44}	6_{50}	2_{52}	5_{57}	0_{57}	57
5	Luke Breust	4_{4}	0_{4}	3_{7}	4_{11}	5_{16}	3_{19}	1_{20}	3_{23}	0_{23}	0_{23}	1_{24}	0_{24}	1_{25}	2_{27}	3_{30}	6_{36}	0_{36}	5_{41}	4_{45}	3_{48}	2_{50}	2_{52}	1_{53}	53
6	Jack Gunston	2_{2}	2_{4}	0_{4}	2_{6}	2_{8}	3_{11}	1_{12}	5_{17}	4_{21}	0_{21}	0_{21}	0_{21}	1_{22}	3_{25}	0_{25}	4_{29}	2_{31}	2_{33}	2_{35}	5_{40}	2_{42}	4_{46}	2_{48}	51
6	Tom McDonald	0_{0}	0_{0}	0_{0}	0_{0}	0_{0}	2_{2}	2_{4}	5_{9}	4_{13}	2_{15}	4_{19}	6_{25}	0_{25}	3_{28}	1_{29}	1_{30}	3_{33}	4_{37}	3_{40}	0_{40}	2_{42}	3_{45}	3_{48}	51
8	Jesse Hogan	3_{3}	5_{8}	1_{9}	1_{10}	2_{12}	2_{14}	3_{17}	3_{20}	1_{21}	5_{26}	5_{31}	0_{31}	0_{31}	0_{31}	3_{34}	2_{36}	4_{40}	1_{41}	1_{42}	4_{46}	1_{47}	0_{47}	0_{47}	47
9	Josh Jenkins	2_{2}	5_{7}	1_{8}	0_{8}	3_{11}	0_{11}	3_{14}	1_{15}	1_{16}	1_{17}	1_{18}	2_{20}	1_{21}	0_{21}	2_{23}	3_{26}	2_{28}	2_{30}	0_{30}	3_{33}	3_{36}	3_{39}	7_{46}	46
10	Josh Caddy	3_{3}	3_{6}	0_{6}	1_{7}	0_{7}	4_{11}	1_{12}	4_{16}	1_{17}	6_{23}	4_{27}	0_{27}	1_{28}	0_{28}	1_{29}	2_{31}	1_{32}	2_{33}	1_{35}	0_{35}	4_{39}	4_{43}	1_{44}	44

=== Best and fairest ===
Club	Award name	Player
Adelaide	Malcolm Blight Medal	Rory Laird
Brisbane Lions	Merrett–Murray Medal	Dayne Zorko
Carlton	John Nicholls Medal	Patrick Cripps
Collingwood	Copeland Trophy	Steele Sidebottom & Brodie Grundy
Essendon	W. S. Crichton Medal	Devon Smith
Fremantle	Doig Medal	Lachie Neale
Geelong	Carji Greeves Medal	Mark Blicavs
Gold Coast	Club Champion	Jarrod Harbrow
Greater Western Sydney	Kevin Sheedy Medal	Lachie Whitfield
Hawthorn	Peter Crimmins Medal	Tom Mitchell
Melbourne	Keith 'Bluey' Truscott Trophy	Max Gawn
North Melbourne	Syd Barker Medal	Shaun Higgins
Port Adelaide	John Cahill Medal	Justin Westhoff
Richmond	Jack Dyer Medal	Jack Riewoldt
St Kilda	Trevor Barker Award	Jack Steven
Sydney	Bob Skilton Medal	Jake Lloyd
West Coast	John Worsfold Medal	Elliot Yeo
Western Bulldogs	Charles Sutton Medal	Lachie Hunter
Source: Foxsports

== Club leadership ==
Table of clubs' coaches and captains in the 2018 season
Club	Coach	Captain(s)	Ref.
Adelaide	Don Pyke	Taylor Walker	
Brisbane Lions	Chris Fagan	Dayne Beams (until 23 May)	
Brisbane Lions	Chris Fagan	Dayne Zorko (from 23 May)	
Carlton	Brendon Bolton	Marc Murphy	
Collingwood	Nathan Buckley	Scott Pendlebury	
Essendon	John Worsfold	Dyson Heppell	
Fremantle	Ross Lyon	Nat Fyfe	
Geelong	Chris Scott	Joel Selwood	
Gold Coast	Stuart Dew	Tom Lynch (until 2 August)	
Gold Coast	Stuart Dew	Steven May	
Greater Western Sydney	Leon Cameron	Phil Davis	
Greater Western Sydney	Leon Cameron	Callan Ward	
Hawthorn	Alastair Clarkson	Jarryd Roughead	
Melbourne	Simon Goodwin	Nathan Jones	
Melbourne	Simon Goodwin	Jack Viney	
North Melbourne	Brad Scott	Jack Ziebell	
Port Adelaide	Ken Hinkley	Travis Boak	
Richmond	Damien Hardwick	Trent Cotchin	
St Kilda	Alan Richardson	Jarryn Geary	
Sydney	John Longmire	Josh Kennedy	
West Coast	Adam Simpson	Shannon Hurn	
Western Bulldogs	Luke Beveridge	Easton Wood	

== Club membership ==
2018 AFL membership figures
Club	Members	Change from 2017	% Change from 2017
Adelaide	64,739	▲7,874	▲13.85%
Brisbane Lions	24,867	▲3,505	▲16.41%
Carlton	56,005	▲5,679	▲11.28%
Collingwood	75,507	▼372	▼0.49%
Essendon	79,319	▲11,551	▲17.04%
Fremantle	55,639	▲4,385	▲8.56%
Geelong	63,818	▲8,964	▲16.34%
Gold Coast	12,108	▲443	▲3.80%
Greater Western Sydney	25,243	▲4,299	▲20.53%
Hawthorn	80,302	▲4,639	▲6.13%
Melbourne	44,275	▲2,049	▲4.84%
North Melbourne	40,789	▲446	▲1.11%
Port Adelaide	54,386	▲2,257	▲4.33%
Richmond	100,726	▲28,057	▲38.61%
St Kilda	46,301	▲4,249	▲10.10%
Sydney	60,934	▲2,096	▲3.56%
West Coast	80,290	▲15,266	▲23.40%
Western Bulldogs	43,246	▼4,407	▼9.25%
Total	1,008,494	▲100,933	▲11.12%

== See also ==
- 2018 AFL Women's season
