= Tom Mitchell (Australian footballer) =

Australian rules footballer

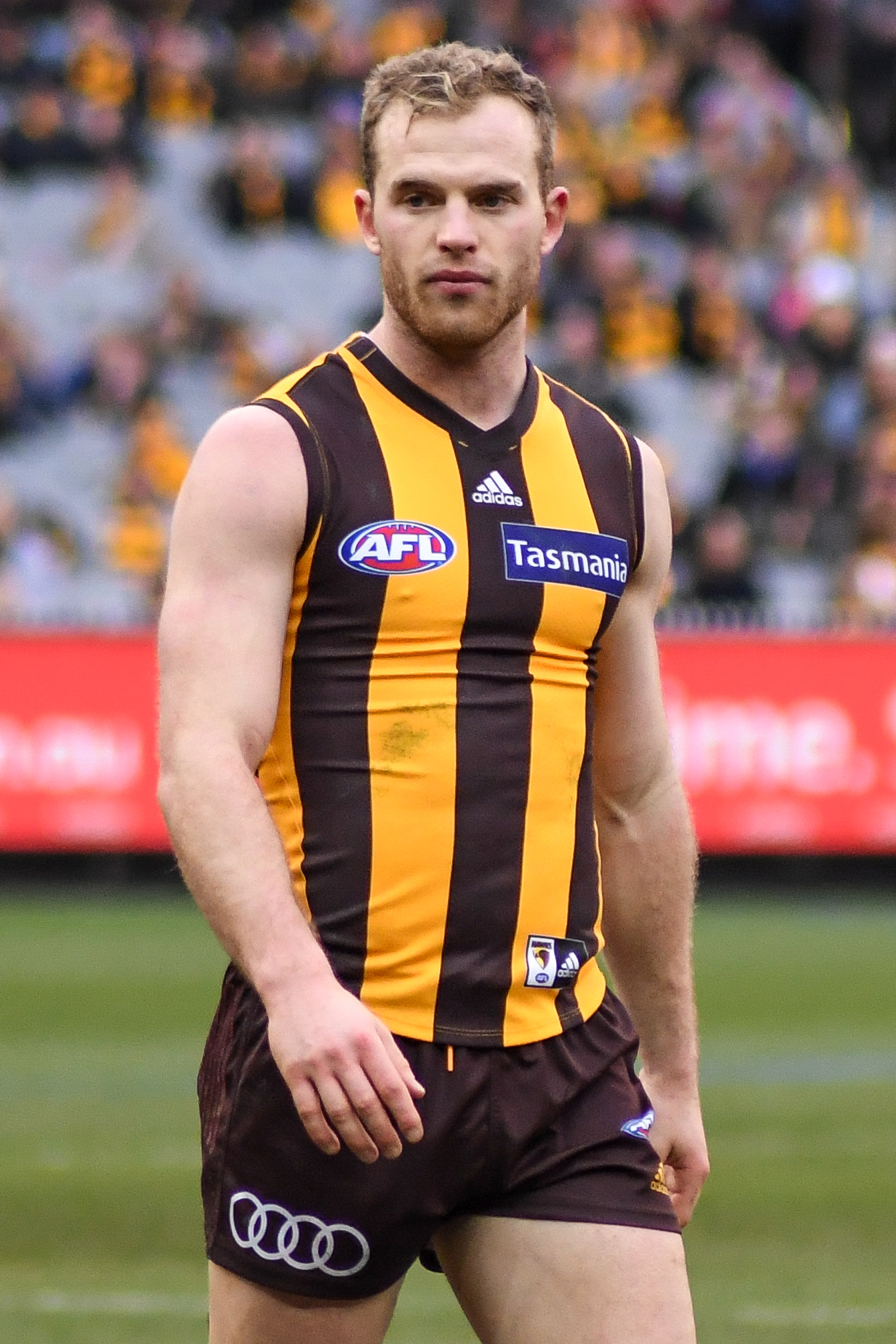
- Mitchell playing for Hawthorn in 2018

Personal information
- Full name: Thomas James Mitchell
- Nickname: Titch
- Born: 31 May 1993 (age 33)
- Original team: Claremont (WAFL)
- Draft: No. 21 (F/S), 2011 national draft
- Debut: Round 10, 2013, Sydney vs. Essendon, at the SCG
- Height: 182 cm (6 ft 0 in)
- Weight: 88 kg (194 lb)
- Position: Midfielder

Playing career
Years	Club	Games (Goals)
2012–2016	Sydney	65 (38)
2017–2022	Hawthorn	106 (38)
2023–2025	Collingwood	36 (8)
Total		207 (84)

Career highlights
- AFL premiership player: 2023; Brownlow Medal: 2018; Leigh Matthews Trophy: 2018; 2× All-Australian team: 2017, 2018; 3× Peter Crimmins Medal: 2017, 2018, 2021; AFL Rising Star nominee: 2013; Lou Richards Medal: 2018

Thomas James Mitchell (born 31 May 1993) is a former professional Australian rules footballer who played for the Sydney Swans , Hawthorn Football Club and Collingwood Football Club in the Australian Football League (AFL).

Mitchell while playing with Hawthorn won the Brownlow Medal as the league's best and fairest player in 2018 and set the record for the most disposals in a VFL/AFL match, accruing 54 in a game against Collingwood during that season. He would later join them in 2023, en route to winning the 2023 AFL Grand Final and his first AFL premiership.

== Personal life ==
Mitchell was born on 31 May 1993, the son of former Sydney, Collingwood and Carlton player Barry Mitchell. He grew up in the Melbourne suburb of Camberwell and attended Carey Baptist Grammar School before relocating to Perth at 15, where he completed his schooling at Hale School. He helped Hale to two victories in the Public Schools Association Alcock Cup competition.

He played juniors for Ashburton Redbacks alongside Jack Viney and Toby Greene.

== AFL career ==
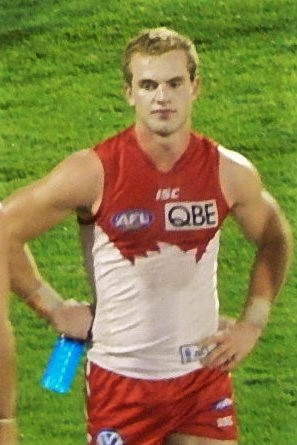
Mitchell playing for Sydney in 2013

=== Sydney (2012–2016) ===
Mitchell was drafted to Sydney with pick 21 in the 2011 AFL draft under the father–son rule. Mitchell experienced a number of injuries in 2012 and despite some good form in reserves games, was unable to break into the senior side that won the premiership.

Mitchell made his debut in round 10, 2013 against Essendon at the SCG. He received a 2013 AFL Rising Star nomination the following week for his round 11 performance against Adelaide. During round 9 of the 2014 season, Mitchell played in the Swans reserves team and had a record 64 disposals (23 contested, 41 uncontested) and kicked four goals.

At the conclusion of the 2016 season, Mitchell requested a trade from Sydney and was subsequently traded to Hawthorn in October.

=== Hawthorn (2017–2022) ===
In the 2017 season, Mitchell broke the VFL/AFL record for the most disposals in a home-and-away season in round 22 when he had his 749th possession, passing Wayne Richardson's mark set in 1971. Following a record-breaking home-and-away season, Mitchell was named in the All-Australian team for the first time. He was runner-up to Dustin Martin in the 2017 Brownlow Medal (Patrick Dangerfield polled more votes, but was ineligible due to suspension). Mitchell won his first Peter Crimmins Medal in that season.

On 24 March 2018, in Round 1 of the 2018 season, Mitchell set the record for the most disposals in an VFL/AFL game, amassing 54, also becoming the first player to have 50 or more disposals in more than one game. Mitchell had 50 possessions in Hawthorn's Round 15 loss to GWS later that year, becoming the first player to have more than one 50+ disposal game in a season as well as the first player to have three 50-disposal-plus games (with no other player having achieved multiple 50-disposal-plus games as of 2023. His 848 disposals in 2018 passed Matt Crouch's season record of 825, set in 2017.

Mitchell won the 2018 Brownlow Medal, the Peter Crimmins Medal, Leigh Matthews Trophy and the Lou Richards Medal. Mitchell became the first Hawthorn player to win the Leigh Matthews Trophy since Shane Crawford in 1999. On 11 January 2019, It was announced that Mitchell would miss the entire 2019 season after suffering a broken leg during a tackling drill at training.

=== Collingwood (2023–2025) ===
Mitchell was traded to Collingwood at the end of the 2022 AFL season. Mitchell's first season with Collingwood was a raging success with the club finishing the season on top of the ladder and Collingwood beating Brisbane in the 2023 AFL Grand Final with Mitchell finishing fourth in Norm Smith Medal voting after having 24 disposals, 7 clearances and a game high 13 tackles.

His last two seasons were marred by a series of injuries that restricted him from playing games. Mitchell was delisted at the end of the 2025 AFL season, after 3 seasons at Collingwood. He announced his official retirement in January 2026.

== Statistics ==
Legend
G	Goals	K	Kicks	D	Disposals	T	Tackles
B	Behinds	H	Handballs	M	Marks
#	Played in that season's premiership team	†	Led the league for the season	±	Won that season's Brownlow Medal

Season	Team	No.	Games	Totals							Averages (per game)							Votes
Season	Team	No.	Games	G	B	K	H	D	M	T	G	B	K	H	D	M	T	Votes
2012	Sydney	6	0	—	—	—	—	—	—	—	—	—	—	—	—	—	—	0
2013	Sydney	6	14	11	17	134	136	270	45	66	0.8	1.2	9.6	9.7	19.3	3.2	4.7	2
2014	Sydney	6	6	2	2	57	68	125	25	34	0.3	0.3	9.5	11.3	20.8	4.2	5.7	0
2015	Sydney	6	19	10	7	211	303	514	70	123	0.5	0.4	11.1	15.9	27.1	3.7	6.5	12
2016	Sydney	6	26	15	13	282	443	725	101	160	0.6	0.5	10.8	17.0	27.9	3.9	6.2	12
2017	Hawthorn	3	22	10	10	307	480	787	117	143	0.5	0.5	14.0	21.8	35.8^{†}	5.3	6.5	25
2018	Hawthorn	3	24	13	7	389	459	848^{†}	113	152	0.5	0.3	16.2	19.1	35.3	4.7	6.3	28^{±}
2019	Hawthorn	3	0	—	—	—	—	—	—	—	—	—	—	—	—	—	—	0
2020 (Note: The 2020 season was played with 17 home-and-away matches per team (down from 22) and 16-minute quarters with time on (down from 20-minute quarters with time on) due to the impact of the COVID-19 pandemic.)	Hawthorn	3	17	2	1	172	257	429	52	75	0.1	0.1	10.1	15.1	25.2	3.1	4.4	10
2021	Hawthorn	3	22	8	5	321	433	754	98	105	0.4	0.2	14.6	19.7^{†}	34.3	4.5	4.8	25
2022	Hawthorn	3	21	5	7	239	350	589	81	96	0.2	0.3	11.4	16.7	28.0	3.9	4.6	9
2023^{#}	Collingwood	6	26	7	1	250	400^{†}	650	79	157	0.3	0.0	9.6	15.4	25.0	3.0	6.0	12
2024	Collingwood	6	6	1	1	37	83	120	11	40	0.2	0.2	6.2	13.8	20.0	1.8	6.7	0
2025	Collingwood	6	4	0	1	32	61	93	17	24	0.0	0.3	8.0	15.3	23.3	4.3	6.0	0
Career			207	84	72	2431	3473	5904	809	1175	0.4	0.3	11.7	16.8	28.5	3.9	5.7	135

== Honours and achievements ==
Team

- AFL premiership player (Collingwood): 2023
- 2× McClelland Trophy (Sydney): 2014, 2016
- 3× AFL minor premiership: (Sydney) 2014, 2016, (Collingwood) 2023

Individual

- Brownlow Medal: 2018
- Leigh Matthews Trophy: 2018
- 2× All-Australian team: 2017, 2018
- 3× Peter Crimmins Medal: 2017, 2018, 2021
- Peter Crimmins Medal runner-up: 2020
- Lou Richards Medal: 2018
- Goodes-O'Loughlin Medal: 2016
- AFL Rising Star nominee: 2013
