= 2017 Melbourne Football Club season =

Melbourne Football Club
2017 season
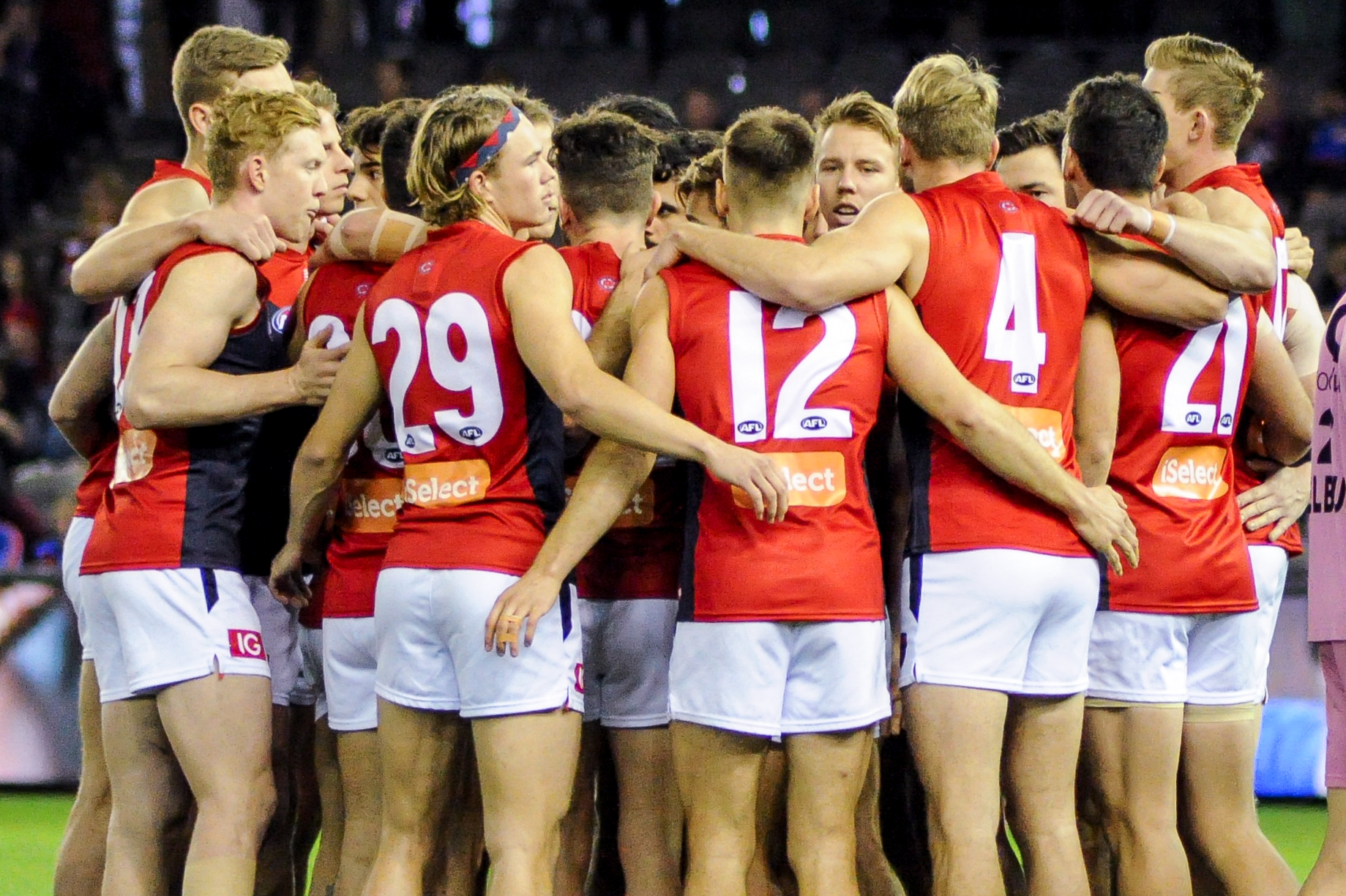
- Melbourne huddle during the round 13 match against the Western Bulldogs
- President: Glen Bartlett^{(4th season)}
- Coach: Simon Goodwin^{(1st season)}
- Captains: Nathan Jones^{(4th season)} Jack Viney^{(1st season)}
- Home grounds: MCG^{(100,024 capacity)}
- Pre-season: 2 wins, 1 loss
- AFL season: 9th
- Finals series: DNQ
- Leading goalkicker: Jeff Garlett^{(42 goals)}
- Highest home attendance: 70,926^{(round 12 vs. Collingwood)}
- Lowest home attendance: 5,072^{(round 10 vs. Gold Coast)}
- Average home attendance: 35694
- Club membership: 42,233^{(▲3,087 / ▲7.89%)}

The 2017 Melbourne Football Club season was the club's 118th year in the VFL/AFL since it began in 1897.

== Senior personnel ==
Simon Goodwin entered his first season as senior coach after taking over from departed coach, Paul Roos, as part of the succession plan. A restructure in the player development area saw the head of development, Brett Allison leave the club with the club electing not to renew his contract; former Geelong player and Essendon assistant coach, Matthew Egan was hired in September 2016 as the replacement for Allison. Former Port Adelaide and Richmond player, Troy Chaplin joined the club in a newly created role, the offensive coordinator, in his first year as an assistant coach after he retired during the 2016 season. The club secured two-time Geelong premiership player and former Geelong and Gold Coast development coach, Max Rooke as a development coach in November 2016. Glen Bartlett will continue in his role as club president, a role he has held since August 2013. Chief Executive Officer, Peter Jackson, will continue with the club after signing a contract extension to the end of the 2018 season.

== Fixture summary ==
After having a home game at Etihad Stadium every season since 2011, the club didn't have to play a home match at Etihad in 2017, which drew pleasure from both the club and fans alike. The team played its first seven matches in Victoria and then travelled to Adelaide to play Adelaide at Adelaide Oval in round eight; the final three matches of the season were played at the Melbourne Cricket Ground against non-finalists in 2016. The club again hosted Collingwood in the annual Queen's Birthday clash in round twelve and played Richmond in the Anzac Day eve match in round five; due to an ongoing sponsorship with Tourism NT, the club hosted two matches in the Northern Territory, the first was against Gold Coast at TIO Traeger Park in round ten and the second was at TIO Stadium against Adelaide in round seventeen. The club played its first Friday night match since the 2015 season and the second in total since the 2012 season, when they hosted Sydney at the Melbourne Cricket Ground in round fifteen. The club had the equal-most six day breaks with eight in total, including two back-to-back from rounds thirteen to fifteen.

In addition to the Friday night match, the club played eleven Saturday matches (five afternoons, three twilights, and three nights), eight Sunday matches (all afternoon matches) and two Monday matches (one afternoon and one night). Nine matches were broadcast on free-to-air on the Seven Network and thirteen were broadcast on pay TV on Fox Footy. The teams the club played twice were Adelaide, Carlton, Collingwood, North Melbourne and St Kilda, with Adelaide and North Melbourne the only teams finishing in the top eight in 2016. With the off-season recruitment of Hawthorn player, Jordan Lewis, both AFL Media and the Herald Sun noted the round seven match against Hawthorn as the "match to watch" for Melbourne's season. Analysis by Champion Data ranked the fixture difficulty as the eighth hardest out of the eighteen teams.

== 2017 list changes ==
=== 2016 trades ===
| Date | Trade gained | Traded from | Trade lost | Ref |
|---|---|---|---|---|
| 18 October | Jordan Lewis; Pick 57; Pick 68 | Hawthorn | Pick 48; Pick 66 | |
| 19 October | Michael Hibberd; Pick 59 | Essendon | Pick 29; Pick 68 | |
| 20 October | Pat McKenna; Pick 51; Pick 69 | Greater Western Sydney | Pick 57; Pick 59 | |
| 20 October | Pick 47 | Collingwood | Lynden Dunn; Pick 51 | |

=== Retirements and delistings ===
| Player | New club | League | Reason | Career games | Career goals | Ref |
|---|---|---|---|---|---|---|
| Chris Dawes | Sorrento | MPNFL | Delisted | 121 | 130 | |
| Jack Grimes | Hurstbridge | NFL | Delisted | 100 | 11 | |
| Matt Jones | South Croydon | EFL | Delisted | 61 | 10 | |
| Max King | South Croydon | EFL | Delisted | 0 | 0 | |
| Viv Michie | Collegians | VAFA | Delisted | 22 | 1 | |
| Ben Newton | focusing on knee rehab in 2017, planning to play in 2018 | | Delisted | 17 | 12 | |
| Dean Terlich | Norwood | SANFL | Delisted | 35 | 2 | |

=== National draft ===
| Round | Overall pick | Player | State | Position | Team from | League from | Ref |
|---|---|---|---|---|---|---|---|
| 3 | 46 | Mitch Hannan | VIC | Utility | Footscray | VFL | |
| 4 | 68 | Dion Johnstone | VIC | Forward | Oakleigh Chargers | TAC Cup | |

=== Rookie draft ===
| Round | Overall pick | Player | State | Position | Team from | League from | Ref |
|---|---|---|---|---|---|---|---|
| 1 | 8 | Lachlan Filipovic | VIC | Ruckman | Sandringham Dragons | TAC Cup | |
| 2 | 25 | Tim Smith | VIC | Forward | Casey | VFL | |
| 3 | 41 | Declan Keilty | VIC | Utility | Casey | VFL | |

== 2017 squad ==
Melbourne Football Club
| Senior list | | Rookie list | Coaching staff |
|---|---|---|---|
| 1 Jesse Hogan; 2 Nathan Jones (c); 3 Christian Salem; 4 Jack Watts; 5 Christian Petracca; 6 Jordan Lewis; 7 Jack Viney (c); 8 Heritier Lumumba (ret); 9 Jack Trengove; 10 Angus Brayshaw; 11 Max Gawn; 12 Dom Tyson; 13 Clayton Oliver; 14 Michael Hibberd; 15 Billy Stretch; 16 Dean Kent; 17 Sam Frost; 18 Jake Melksham; 19 Mitch Hannan; 20 Colin Garland | 21 Cameron Pedersen; 22 Aaron vandenBerg; 23 Bernie Vince; 24 Jay Kennedy Harris; 25 Tom McDonald; 26 Sam Weideman; 27 Liam Hulett; 28 Oscar McDonald; 29 Jayden Hunt; 30 Alex Neal-Bullen; 32 Tomas Bugg; 33 Jake Spencer; 34 Mitch King; 35 Ben Kennedy; 36 Jeff Garlett; 37 Dion Johnstone; 39 Neville Jetta; 40 Pat McKenna; 42 Josh Wagner; 43 James Harmes | 38 Tim Smith; 41 Mitch White; 44 Joel Smith (B); 45 Declan Keilty; 47 Lachlan Filipovic; 48 Corey Maynard (B) | Head coach: Simon Goodwin; Assistant coaches: Brendan McCartney (player/coach performance); Troy Chaplin (offensive coordinator); Jade Rawlings (defensive coordinatior); Ben Mathews (stoppages); Matthew Egan (head of development); Max Rooke (development); Justin Plapp (Casey VFL coach); Legend: (c) Captain(s); (vc) Vice-captain(s); Long-term injury list; (B) Category B rookie; (ret) Retired; Updated: 24 February 2017; Source(s): Players, Coaches |

== 2017 season ==
=== Pre-season ===
==== JLT Community Series ====
===== Week 1 =====
Round 1
Saturday, 18 February (4:40 pm) | Western Bulldogs | def. by | Melbourne | Whitten Oval (crowd: 7,581) | Report
0.2.0 (12); 1.6.3 (48); 1.8.4 (61); 2.9.14 (86) | Q1; Q2; Q3; Final | 0.4.2 (26); 0.8.3 (51); 0.12.5 (77); 0.14.8 (92) | Umpires: Williamson, Dalgleish, Rosebury, Margetts; Television broadcast: Fox Footy
Super goals: Cloke, Johannisen; Dahlhaus 2, Hunter 2, Cloke, Dale, Lynch, Daniel, McLean | Goals | Super goals: Nil; Hogan 4, Weideman 2, Petracca, Gawn, Viney, Bugg, Jones, Neal-Bullen, Brayshaw, Garlett
Dahlhaus, Hunter, Liberatore, McLean, Cloke, Murphy | Best | Hogan, Viney, Lewis, O. McDonald, Salem, Jones, Gawn
Roughead (right knee) | Injuries | Wagner (right ankle)
Nil | Reports | Nil

===== Week 2 =====
Round 2
Saturday, 25 February (2:05 pm) | Melbourne | def. | Carlton | Casey Fields (crowd: 7,256) | Report
0.5.4 (34); 0.9.5 (59); 0.12.10 (82); 0.17.14 (116) | Q1; Q2; Q3; Final | 0.1.2 (9); 0.3.5 (23); 0.7.6 (48); 0.9.8 (62) | Umpires: Schmitt, Ryan, McInerny, Glouftsis; Television broadcast: Fox Footy
Petracca 4, Hogan 3, vandenBerg 2, Viney 2, Gawn 2, Salem 2, Neal-Bullen, Kennedy Harris | Goals | Casboult 2, Pickett 2, Weitering, Thomas, LeBois, C. Curnow, Cuningham
Petracca, Hogan, Viney, Jones, Gawn, Salem, Vince | Best | Simpson, Gibbs, Marchbank, Kreuzer
Nil | Injuries | Gorringe (leg)
Nil | Reports | Nil

===== Week 3 =====
Round 3
Thursday, 9 March (5:50 pm) | West Coast | def. | Melbourne | Domain Stadium (crowd: 5,337) | Report
0.3.5 (23); 0.7.5 (47); 0.12.8 (80); 0.14.11 (95) | Q1; Q2; Q3; Final | 0.2.2 (14); 0.6.3 (39); 0.8.5 (53); 1.9.7 (70) | Umpires: Haussen, Dalgleish, Kamolins, Adams; Television broadcast: Fox Footy
Super goals: Nil; Kennedy 5, LeCras 2, Darling 2, Vardy 2, Priddis, Gaff, Hill | Goals | Super goals: Hunt; Spencer 3, Hogan 2, Brayshaw, Jones, Salem, Viney
Mitchell, Masten, Gaff, Vardy, Kennedy, Wellingham, LeCras | Best | Oliver, Hunt, Lewis, Spencer, Bugg, Salem
Nil | Injuries | Nil
Nil | Reports | Nil

=== Home and away season ===
==== Round 1 ====
Round 1
Saturday, 25 March (4:35 pm) | St Kilda | def. by | Melbourne | Etihad Stadium (crowd: 36,249) | Report
6.2 (38); 7.8 (50); 9.9 (63); 13.12 (90) | Q1; Q2; Q3; Final | 2.3 (15); 9.4 (58); 15.7 (97); 18.12 (120) | Umpires: Chamberlain, Fleer, Ryan; Television broadcast: Fox Footy
Riewoldt 5, Gresham 3, Billings, Armitage, Membrey, Lonie, Dunstan, Bruce | Goals | Garlett 3, Hogan 3, Hannan 2, Petracca 2, Stretch, Watts, Weideman, Jetta, Vince, Neal-Bullen, Brayshaw, Jones
Riewoldt, Gresham, Billings, Steven, Steele | Best | Oliver, Lewis, Gawn, Jones, Vince, Hogan, Jetta, Garlett
McCartin (hamstring tightness) replaced in selected side by Lonie, Riewoldt (knee) | Injuries | J. Smith (shoulder), Gawn (back)
Nil | Reports | Nil
Debut(s): Mitch Hannan, Joel Smith; Debut(s) for MFC: Jordan Lewis (Hawthorn), Jake Melksham (Essendon); Milestone(s): Mitch Hannan (1st AFL goal); Brownlow votes: Clayton Oliver (Melbourne) 3 votes, Nathan Jones (Melbourne) 2 votes, Max Gawn (Melbourne) 1 vote Record: 1 win, 0 losses, 0 draws (133.33%); Ladder position: 6th

==== Round 2 ====
Round 2
Sunday, 2 April (3:20 pm) | Melbourne | def. | Carlton | Melbourne Cricket Ground (crowd: 46,727) | Report
3.2 (20); 6.4 (40); 7.5 (47); 13.8 (86) | Q1; Q2; Q3; Final | 2.2 (14); 4.6 (30); 7.8 (50); 9.10 (60) | Umpires: Dalgleish, Meredith, Williamson; Television broadcast: Seven Network
Garlett 3, Watts 2, Weideman 2, Jones 2, Salem, Gawn, Petracca, Tyson | Goals | Wright 3, Casboult, E. Curnow, Murphy, Armfield, Petrevski-Seton, Pickett
Salem, Tyson, Oliver, Watts, Garlett, Jones, Harmes | Best | Wright, Murphy, Cripps, Docherty, Gibbs, E. Curnow
Brayshaw (cut eye) | Injuries | Thomas (right knee), Silvagni (corked thigh and ankle)
Nil | Reports | Nil
Brownlow votes: Christian Salem (Melbourne) 3 votes, Dom Tyson (Melbourne) 2 votes, Clayton Oliver (Melbourne) 1 vote Record: 2 wins, 0 losses, 0 draws (133.77%); Ladder position: 4th

==== Round 3 ====
Round 3
Saturday, 8 April (4:35 pm) | Geelong | def. | Melbourne | Etihad Stadium (crowd: 29,733) | Report
5.2 (32); 9.2 (56); 14.2 (86); 20.6 (126) | Q1; Q2; Q3; Final | 2.4 (14); 7.11 (53); 12.17 (89); 13.19 (97) | Umpires: Hosking, Ryan, Mollison; Television broadcast: Fox Footy
Hawkins 5, Menzel 4, Dangerfield 3, Blicavs 2, Motlop 2, McCarthy, J. Selwood, Smith, Parfitt | Goals | Kent 2, Watts 2, Petracca, T. Smith, Stretch, Hunt, Garlett, Neal-Bullen, Jetta, Hannan, Harmes
J. Selwood, Dangerfield, Menzel, Hawkins, Blicavs, Ruggles, Parfitt | Best | Jones, Hunt, Watts, Viney, Stretch, Neal-Bullen, Kent
J. Selwood (cut head), Hawkins (corked quad) | Injuries | Gawn (hamstring), Kent (cut head)
Nil | Reports | Nil
Debut(s): Tim Smith; Milestone(s): Tim Smith (1st AFL goal); Brownlow votes: Joel Selwood (Geelong) 3 votes, Patrick Dangerfield (Geelong) 2 votes, Jack Watts (Melbourne) 1 vote Record: 2 wins, 1 loss, 0 draws (108.21%); Ladder position: 8th

==== Round 4 ====
Round 4
Saturday, 15 April (1:45 pm) | Melbourne | def. by | Fremantle | Melbourne Cricket Ground (crowd: 27,829) | Report
2.5 (17); 9.7 (61); 9.10 (64); 15.14 (104) | Q1; Q2; Q3; Final | 3.2 (20); 6.4 (40); 13.8 (86); 16.10 (106) | Umpires: Stevic, Harris, Mitchell; Television broadcast: Fox Footy
Garlett 3, Harmes 2, Spencer 2, Petracca 2, Watts 2, Kent, Neal-Bullen, Salem, Viney | Goals | Neale 4, Mundy 3, McCarthy 2, Kersten, Fyfe, Balic, Walters, Crozier, S. Hill, Grey
Oliver, Tyson, Petracca, Garlett, Watts, Harmes | Best | Mundy, Sandilands, Fyfe, Weller, Neale, S. Hill
Nil | Injuries | S. Hill (corked thigh), Langdon (migraine)
Nil | Reports | Nil
Milestone(s): Jeff Garlett (150th AFL game); Brownlow votes: Lachie Neale (Fremantle) 3 votes, Nat Fyfe (Fremantle) 2 votes, David Mundy (Fremantle) 1 vote Record: 2 wins, 2 losses, 0 draws (105.44%); Ladder position: 8th

==== Round 5 ====
Round 5
Monday, 24 April (7:25 pm) | Richmond | def. | Melbourne | Melbourne Cricket Ground (crowd: 85,657) | Report
3.1 (19); 6.6 (42); 7.11 (53); 12.16 (88) | Q1; Q2; Q3; Final | 3.4 (22); 7.6 (48); 11.7 (73); 11.9 (75) | Umpires: Donlon, Fisher, Stevic; Television broadcast: Seven Network
Riewoldt 6, Castagna, Butler, Grigg, Rioli, Martin, Caddy | Goals | Hogan 3, Garlett 2, T. McDonald, Watts, Petracca, Salem, Hibberd, Hunt
Riewoldt, Nankervis, Martin, Houli, Grigg, Caddy, Cotchin | Best | Oliver, Hibberd, Hunt, Jones, Frost, Petracca
Nil | Injuries | Petracca (knee), Spencer (shoulder/knee), T. Smith (ribs), Viney (knee)
Nil | Reports | Nil
Debut(s) for MFC: Michael Hibberd (Essendon); Brownlow votes: Jack Riewoldt (Richmond) 3 votes, Toby Nankervis (Richmond) 2 votes, Dustin Martin (Richmond) 1 vote Record: 2 wins, 3 losses, 0 draws (101.69%); Ladder position: 10th

==== Round 6 ====
Round 6
Sunday, 30 April (1:10 pm) | Essendon | def. by | Melbourne | Etihad Stadium (crowd: 44,040) | Report
2.2 (14); 4.8 (32); 6.12 (48); 10.14 (74) | Q1; Q2; Q3; Final | 2.4 (16); 4.6 (30); 12.9 (81); 17.10 (112) | Umpires: Haussen, Nicholls, Hay; Television broadcast: Fox Footy
Fantasia 2, Hooker 2, Parish, McGrath, Daniher, McDonald-Tipungwuti, Colyer, Bellchambers | Goals | Petracca 4, Watts 4, Hannan 3, Garlett 3, T. McDonald, Pedersen, Lewis
Goddard, Hurley, Z. Merrett, McGrath, Gleeson | Best | T. McDonald, Petracca, Lewis, Oliver, Hibberd, Pedersen
Nil | Injuries | Nil
Nil | Reports | Nil
Milestone(s): Neville Jetta (100th AFL game); Brownlow votes: Tom McDonald (Melbourne) 3 votes, Jordan Lewis (Melbourne) 2 votes, Clayton Oliver (Melbourne) 1 vote Record: 3 wins, 3 losses, 0 draws (108.39%); Ladder position: 8th

==== Round 7 ====
Round 7
Sunday, 7 May (3:20 pm) | Melbourne | def. by | Hawthorn | Melbourne Cricket Ground (crowd: 38,693) | Report
1.1 (7); 4.2 (26); 11.6 (72); 14.7 (91) | Q1; Q2; Q3; Final | 5.4 (34); 8.7 (57); 11.7 (73); 14.10 (94) | Umpires: Kamolins, Ryan, Jeffery; Television broadcast: Seven Network
Garlett 3, Hogan 3, Hunt 2, Lewis 2, Pedersen, Viney, Jones, Watts | Goals | Roughead 4, McEvoy 2, Gunston 2, O'Brien 2, Breust, Langford, Burgoyne, Smith
Viney, Lewis, Frost, Oliver, Jones, Hibberd, Hogan | Best | McEvoy, Burgoyne, Roughead, Mitchell, Langford, O'Brien, Hardwick
Hunt (left shoulder) | Injuries | O'Meara (knee soreness) replaced in selected side by Langford, Birchall (right knee)
Nil | Reports | Nil
Brownlow votes: Jack Viney (Melbourne) 3 votes, Ben McEvoy (Hawthorn) 2 votes, Tom Mitchell (Hawthorn) 1 vote Record: 3 wins, 4 losses, 0 draws (106.70%); Ladder position: 10th

==== Round 8 ====
Round 8
Saturday, 13 May (7:10 pm) | Adelaide | def. by | Melbourne | Adelaide Oval (crowd: 47,882) | Report
1.4 (8); 6.7 (43); 7.8 (50); 9.12 (66) | Q1; Q2; Q3; Final | 2.2 (14); 5.3 (33); 12.5 (89); 17.5 (107) | Umpires: Kamolins, Fleer, Hundertmark, Ryan; Television broadcast: Fox Footy
Walker 2, Betts 2, Jenkins 2, Laird, Atkins, Smith | Goals | Pedersen 3, T. McDonald 2, Bugg 2, Jones 2, Garlett 2, Kent 2, Viney, Oliver, Petracca, Hannan
Laird, Jacobs, Atkins | Best | Viney, T. McDonald, Salem, Oliver, Vince, Petracca, Jones, Hibberd
Nil | Injuries | Hunt (concussion)
Nil | Reports | Nil
Milestone(s): Bernie Vince (200th AFL game); Brownlow votes: Jack Viney (Melbourne) 3 votes, Tom McDonald (Melbourne) 2 votes, Clayton Oliver (Melbourne) 1 vote Record: 4 wins, 4 losses, 0 draws (111.86%); Ladder position: 10th

==== Round 9 ====
Round 9
Sunday, 21 May (3:20 pm) | Melbourne | def. by | North Melbourne | Melbourne Cricket Ground (crowd: 33,218) | Report
2.5 (17); 8.7 (55); 9.9 (63); 13.12 (90) | Q1; Q2; Q3; Final | 6.7 (37); 8.9 (57); 12.13 (85); 15.14 (104) | Umpires: Nicholls, Hosking, Hay; Television broadcast: Seven Network
Hannan 3, Pedersen 2, Jones, Viney, Frost, Jetta, Oliver, Salem, Lewis, Kent | Goals | Brown 5, Wood 3, Garner 2, Cunnington, Ziebell, M. Williams, Higgins, McDonald
Hibberd, Tyson, T. McDonald, Jones, Hannan | Best | Brown, Cunnington, Turner, Goldstein, Thompson, Tarrant
Nil | Injuries | Cunnington (ankle/knee)
Nil | Reports | Nil
Brownlow votes: Ben Brown (North Melbourne) 3 votes, Ben Cunnington (North Melbourne) 2 votes, Michael Hibberd (Melbourne) 1 vote Record: 4 wins, 5 losses, 0 draws (108.62%); Ladder position: 11th

==== Round 10 ====
Round 10
Saturday, 27 May (4:35 pm) | Melbourne | def. | Gold Coast | TIO Traeger Park (crowd: 5,072) | Report
2.1 (13); 4.8 (32); 9.10 (64); 18.14 (122) | Q1; Q2; Q3; Final | 4.5 (29); 7.7 (49); 9.8 (62); 13.9 (87) | Umpires: Williamson, Jeffery, Glouftsis; Television broadcast: Fox Footy
Garlett 5, Jones 3, Harmes 3, Hannan 3, Tyson, Petracca, Neal-Bullen, Watts | Goals | Matera 3, Lynch 2, Wright 2, Barlow 2, Sexton, Lemmens, Kolodjashnij, Hall
Oliver, Jones, Hibberd, Lewis, Garlett, Melksham | Best | Hall, Swallow, Kolodjashnij, Leslie, Matera
Nil | Injuries | Nil
Nil | Reports | Nil
Milestone(s): Cameron Pedersen (50th MFC game); Brownlow votes: Nathan Jones (Melbourne) 3 votes, Jeff Garlett (Melbourne) 2 votes, Aaron Hall (Gold Coast) 1 vote Record: 5 wins, 5 losses, 0 draws (111.68%); Ladder position: 9th

==== Round 11 ====
| Round 11 |
| Bye; Melbourne |

==== Round 12 ====
Round 12
Monday, 12 June (3:20 pm) | Melbourne | def. | Collingwood | Melbourne Cricket Ground (crowd: 70,926) | Report
4.3 (21); 6.6 (42); 12.9 (81); 15.14 (104) | Q1; Q2; Q3; Final | 3.2 (20); 10.5 (65); 12.8 (80); 15.10 (100) | Umpires: Rosebury, Stephens, Ryan, Mollison; Television broadcast: Seven Network
Petracca 3, Watts 3, Garlett 2, Bugg 2, T. McDonald, Harmes, Pedersen, Melksham, Hannan | Goals | Greenwood 2, Sidebottom 2, Moore 2, Phillips 2, De Goey 2, Fasolo 2, Aish, Crocker, Treloar
Petracca, Jones, Viney, Hibberd, Watts, Hunt, Garlett | Best | Sidebottom, Grundy, Treloar, Howe, Maynard, Broomhead
Watts (hip) | Injuries | Nil
Nil | Reports | Nil
Brownlow votes: Steele Sidebottom (Collingwood) 3 votes, Christian Petracca (Melbourne) 2 votes, Brodie Grundy (Collingwood) 1 vote Record: 6 wins, 5 losses, 0 draws (110.91%); Ladder position: 6th

==== Round 13 ====
Round 13
Sunday, 18 June (3:20 pm) | Western Bulldogs | def. by | Melbourne | Etihad Stadium (crowd: 33,667) | Report
0.1 (1); 3.3 (21); 6.5 (41); 8.8 (56) | Q1; Q2; Q3; Final | 4.2 (26); 8.6 (54); 14.7 (91); 17.11 (113) | Umpires: Foot, Rosebury, Hosking, Findlay; Television broadcast: Fox Footy
Roughead, Bontempelli, Dickson, T. Boyd, Dahlhaus, Daniel, Picken, Liberatore | Goals | Watts 3, Bugg 2, Garlett 2, Hannan 2, T. McDonald 2, Melksham, Petracca, Tyson, Salem, Harmes, Neal-Bullen
Bontempelli, Hunter, Wallis, Liberatore, Daniel | Best | Hibberd, Oliver, Watts, T. McDonald, O. McDonald, Petracca, Garlett
Jong (knee) | Injuries | Jones (quad), Watts (hamstring)
Nil | Reports | Nil
Brownlow votes: Michael Hibberd (Melbourne) 3 votes, Tom McDonald (Melbourne) 2 votes, Oscar McDonald (Melbourne) 1 vote Record: 7 wins, 5 losses, 0 draws (115.73%); Ladder position: 5th

==== Round 14 ====
Round 14
Saturday, 24 June (5:40 pm) | West Coast | def. by | Melbourne | Domain Stadium (crowd: 36,622) | Report
2.5; 5.7; 11.10; 14.12 (96) | Q1; Q2; Q3; Final | 3.1; 6.6; 10.8; 15.9 (99) | Umpires: Mitchell, Rosebury, Stephens; Television broadcast: Seven Network
Petrie 4, McGovern 3, Hutchings 2, Hill 2, Karpany, Gaff, Sheed | Goals | T. McDonald 5, Neal-Bullen 2, Petracca, Stretch, Viney, Bugg, Harmes, Melksham, Hannan, Pedersen
Petrie, McGovern, Mitchell, Jetta, Sheed, Duggan, Vardy | Best | Viney, T. McDonald, Tyson, Lewis, Gawn, Pedersen, Oliver
Hurn (chest) | Injuries | Viney (shoulder)
Schofield (striking) | Reports | Nil
Milestones: Sam Frost (50th AFL game); Brownlow votes: Jack Viney (Melbourne) 3 votes, Tom McDonald (Melbourne) 2 votes, Dom Tyson (Melbourne) 1 vote Record: 8 wins, 5 losses, 0 draws (114.68%); Ladder position: 5th

==== Round 15 ====
Round 15
Friday, 30 June (7:50 pm) | Melbourne | def. by | Sydney | Melbourne Cricket Ground (crowd: 47,464) | Report
4.0 (24); 4.1 (25); 5.4 (34); 7.8 (50) | Q1; Q2; Q3; Final | 1.8 (14); 5.15 (45); 8.16 (64); 11.19 (85) | Umpires: Fisher, Stevic, McInerney; Television broadcast: Seven Network
T. McDonald 2, Petracca 2, Hannan, Hunt, Melksham | Goals | Franklin 4, Papley 2, Parker, Heeney, K. Jack, Reid, Lloyd
Hibberd, Vince, T. McDonald, Tyson, Jetta | Best | Parker, Kennedy, Lloyd, Jones, Franklin, Newman
Viney (foot) | Injuries | Mills (concussion), Jones (cut head)
Bugg (striking) | Reports | Nil
Brownlow votes: Luke Parker (Sydney) 3 votes, Lance Franklin (Sydney) 2 votes, Josh Kennedy (Sydney) 1 vote Record: 8 wins, 6 losses, 0 draws (110.84%); Ladder position: 6th

==== Round 16 ====
Round 16
Sunday, 9 July (3:20 pm) | Carlton | def. by | Melbourne | Melbourne Cricket Ground (crowd: 47,266) | Report
4.3 (27); 7.5 (47); 9.8 (62); 12.10 (82) | Q1; Q2; Q3; Final | 1.2 (8); 7.4 (46); 11.5 (71); 14.6 (90) | Umpires: Deboy, Williamson, Ryan; Television broadcast: Seven Network
Silvagni 3, C. Curnow 2, Wright 2, Murphy 2, Casboult, Kreuzer, Petrevski-Seton | Goals | T. McDonald 4, Garlett 3, Wagner 2, Neal-Bullen 2, Melksham, Hogan, Lewis
Kreuzer, Gibbs, Murphy, C. Curnow, Docherty, Casboult, Kerridge | Best | T. McDonald, Oliver, Neal-Bullen, Jetta, Petracca, Frost, Lewis
Cripps (leg), White (knee) | Injuries | Nil
Nil | Reports | Nil
Milestone(s): Josh Wagner (1st AFL goal); Brownlow votes: Kade Simpson (Carlton) 3 votes, Clayton Oliver (Melbourne) 2 votes, Marc Murphy (Carlton) 1 vote Record: 9 wins, 6 losses, 0 draws (110.77%); Ladder position: 5th

==== Round 17 ====
Round 17
Saturday, 15 July (7:10 pm) | Melbourne | def. by | Adelaide | TIO Stadium (crowd: 12,104) | Report
1.3 (9); 5.3 (33); 9.7 (61); 10.10 (70) | Q1; Q2; Q3; Final | 7.2 (44); 11.6 (72); 12.11 (83); 17.14 (116) | Umpires: Donlon, Rosebury, Ryan; Television broadcast: Seven Network
Melksham 3, Kent, Petracca, Neal-Bullen, Oliver, Gawn, Hunt, T. McDonald | Goals | Walker 4, Lynch 3, Mackay 2, McGovern 2, Betts 2, Knight, B. Crouch, Jacobs, Jenkins
Hibberd, Vince, Lewis, Kennedy Harris, Hunt, Neal-Bullen | Best | B. Crouch, Walker, Lynch, Laird, M.Crouch, Cameron
Kent (shoulder) | Injuries | Sloane (concussion), Lever (hamstring)
Vince (rough conduct) | Reports | Walker (striking)
Brownlow votes: Tom Lynch (Adelaide) 3 votes, Rory Laird (Adelaide) 2 votes, Brad Crouch (Adelaide) 1 vote Record: 9 wins, 7 losses, 0 draws (106.69%); Ladder position: 7th

==== Round 18 ====
Round 18
Saturday, 22 July (2:10 pm) | Melbourne | def. | Port Adelaide | Melbourne Cricket Ground (crowd: 27,068) | Report
4.4 (28); 8.8 (56); 11.8 (74); 13.10 (88) | Q1; Q2; Q3; Final | 0.3 (3); 3.6 (24); 6.10 (46); 9.11 (65) | Umpires: Donlon, Nicholls, Meredith; Television broadcast: Fox Footy
Hogan 3, Melksham 3, Garlett 2, Petracca 2, T. McDonald, Harmes, Hannan | Goals | Boak 4, Westhoff 2, Trengove, Wingard, Dixon
Hibberd, Tyson, Hogan, Hunt, Gawn, Viney, Jetta | Best | R. Gray, Boak, Ebert, Powell-Pepper, Wines, S. Gray
Gawn (ankle) | Injuries | Wingard (ankle), Broadbent (leg)
Nil | Reports | Nil
Milestone(s): Jack Watts (150th AFL game); Brownlow votes: Michael Hibberd (Melbourne) 3 votes, Travis Boak (Port Adelaide) 2 votes, Clayton Oliver (Melbourne) 1 vote Record: 10 wins, 7 losses, 0 draws (107.94%); Ladder position: 7th

==== Round 19 ====
Round 19
Saturday, 29 July (1:45 pm) | North Melbourne | def. | Melbourne | Blundstone Arena (crowd: 13,939) | Report
4.4 (28); 6.4 (40); 9.8 (62); 11.10 (76) | Q1; Q2; Q3; Final | 2.0 (12); 8.5 (53); 8.8 (56); 10.12 (72) | Umpires: Fisher, Harris, Pannell; Television broadcast: Fox Footy
Brown 4, Simpkin 2, Waite, Swallow, McDonald, Thompson, Higgins | Goals | Garlett 3, Melksham 2, T. McDonald 2, Oliver, Hogan, Hunt
Brown, Higgins, McDonald, Swallow, Ziebell | Best | Oliver, Gawn, Lewis, Garlett, Tyson
Waite (calf) | Injuries | Hogan (collarbone)
Nil | Reports | Nil
Brownlow votes: Clayton Oliver (Melbourne) 3 votes, Ben Brown (North Melbourne) 2 votes, Shaun Higgins (North Melbourne) 1 vote Record: 10 wins, 8 losses, 0 draws (107.30%); Ladder position: 7th

==== Round 20 ====
Round 20
Saturday, 5 August (1:45 pm) | Greater Western Sydney | def. | Melbourne | UNSW Canberra Oval (crowd: 14,274) | Report
8.6 (54); 10.7 (67); 13.12 (90); 14.13 (97) | Q1; Q2; Q3; Final | 3.0 (18); 5.1 (31); 7.1 (43); 10.2 (62) | Umpires: Chamberlain, Williamson, Ryan; Television broadcast: Fox Footy
Kelly 3, Johnson 2, Smith 2, Coniglio, Scully, Himmelberg, Shiel, Ward, Mumford, Deledio | Goals | Melksham 2, Neal-Bullen 2, Gawn, Tyson, T. McDonald, Pedersen, Watts, Maynard
Kelly, Ward, Coniglio, Scully, Shiel, Mumford, Williams | Best | Gawn, Lewis, Oliver, Hibberd, Vince
Nil | Injuries | Nil
Nil | Reports | Nil
Debut(s): Corey Maynard; Brownlow votes: Josh Kelly (Greater Western Sydney) 3 votes, Max Gawn (Melbourne) 2 votes, Callan Ward (Greater Western Sydney) 1 vote Record: 10 wins, 9 losses, 0 draws (104.78%); Ladder position: 10th

==== Round 21 ====
Round 21
Sunday, 13 August (1:10 pm) | Melbourne | def. | St Kilda | Melbourne Cricket Ground (crowd: 53,115) | Report
6.3 (39); 9.6 (60); 10.9 (69); 14.12 (96) | Q1; Q2; Q3; Final | 1.1 (7); 4.4 (28); 8.11 (59); 10.12 (72) | Umpires: Stephen, Chamberlain, Ryan; Television broadcast: Fox Footy
Harmes 3, Pedersen 2, Hannan 2, Melksham 2, Viney, Tyson, Gawn, Neal-Bullen, Garlett | Goals | Dunstan 2, Membrey 2, Sinclair 2, Bruce, Billings, Weller, Webster
Jones, Pedersen, Oliver, Harmes, Brayshaw, Lewis | Best | Steven, Dunstan, Billings, Ross, Steele, Longer, Carlisle, Geary
O. McDonald (ribs) | Injuries | Stevens (concussion/ear), Billings (eye)
Nil | Reports | Nil
Brownlow votes: Cameron Pedersen (Melbourne) 3 votes, Nathan Jones (Melbourne) 2 votes, Jack Billings (St Kilda) 1 vote Record: 11 wins, 9 losses, 0 draws (105.96%); Ladder position: 7th

==== Round 22 ====
Round 22
Sunday, 20 August (1:10 pm) | Melbourne | def. | Brisbane Lions | Melbourne Cricket Ground (crowd: 30,422) | Report
3.3 (21); 6.6 (42); 11.8 (74); 16.8 (104) | Q1; Q2; Q3; Final | 2.3 (15); 6.3 (39); 9.5 (59); 14.7 (91) | Umpires: Rosebury, Gavine, Mollison; Television broadcast: Fox Footy
Hogan 6, Pedersen 3, Garlett 2, Melksham, Vince, Petracca, Harmes, Brayshaw | Goals | D. Beams 3, Rockliff 2, Gardiner, Zorko, Hipwood, Barrett, Bastinac, Allison, Close, Walker, McCluggage
Hogan, Pedersen, Petracca, Jones, Oliver, Hibberd, Melksham | Best | D. Beams, Zorko, Bastinac, Taylor, Rockliff, Witherden
Nil | Injuries | D. Beams (head), C. Beams (head)
Nil | Reports | Nil
Milestone(s): Jesse Hogan (100th AFL goal, 50th AFL game); Brownlow votes: Jesse Hogan (Melbourne) 3 votes, Dayne Beams (Brisbane Lions) 2 votes, Cameron Pedersen (Melbourne) 1 vote Record: 12 wins, 9 losses, 0 draws (106.38%); Ladder position: 7th

==== Round 23 ====
Round 23
Saturday, 26 August (1:45 pm) | Collingwood | def. | Melbourne | Melbourne Cricket Ground (crowd: 51,223) | Report
6.5 (35); 9.6 (60); 12.10 (82); 14.15 (99) | Q1; Q2; Q3; Final | 1.3 (9); 4.8 (32); 9.10 (64); 12.11 (83) | Umpires: Rosebury, Deboy, Pannell; Television broadcast: Fox Footy
Elliott 3, Phillips 2, Cox 2, Hoskin-Elliott 2, Daicos, Grundy, Sidebottom, Broomhead, Adams | Goals | Melksham 3, Garlett 2, Neal-Bullen 2, Petracca 2, Watts, Hannan, Pedersen
Elliott, Adams, Hoskin-Elliott, Sidebottom, Treloar, Dunn, Maynard | Best | Oliver, Petracca, Lewis, Melksham, Watts
Sidebottom (hamstring) | Injuries | Hogan (hamstring)
Nil | Reports | Nil
Brownlow votes: Will Hoskin-Elliott (Collingwood) 3 votes, Taylor Adams (Collingwood) 2 votes, Jamie Elliott (Collingwood) 1 vote Record: 12 wins, 10 losses, 0 draws (105.22%); Ladder position: 9th

== Ladder ==
| Pos | Team | Pld | W | L | D | PF | PA | PP | Pts | Qualification |
|---|---|---|---|---|---|---|---|---|---|---|
| 1 | Adelaide | 22 | 15 | 6 | 1 | 2415 | 1776 | 136.0 | 62 | 2017 finals |
| 2 | Geelong | 22 | 15 | 6 | 1 | 2134 | 1818 | 117.4 | 62 | 2017 finals |
| 3 | Richmond (P) | 22 | 15 | 7 | 0 | 1992 | 1684 | 118.3 | 60 | 2017 finals |
| 4 | Greater Western Sydney | 22 | 14 | 6 | 2 | 2081 | 1812 | 114.8 | 60 | 2017 finals |
| 5 | Port Adelaide | 22 | 14 | 8 | 0 | 2168 | 1671 | 129.7 | 56 | 2017 finals |
| 6 | Sydney | 22 | 14 | 8 | 0 | 2093 | 1651 | 126.8 | 56 | 2017 finals |
| 7 | Essendon | 22 | 12 | 10 | 0 | 2135 | 2004 | 106.5 | 48 | 2017 finals |
| 8 | West Coast | 22 | 12 | 10 | 0 | 1964 | 1858 | 105.7 | 48 | 2017 finals |
| 9 | Melbourne | 22 | 12 | 10 | 0 | 2035 | 1934 | 105.2 | 48 | |
| 10 | Western Bulldogs | 22 | 11 | 11 | 0 | 1857 | 1913 | 97.1 | 44 | |
| 11 | St Kilda | 22 | 11 | 11 | 0 | 1925 | 1986 | 96.9 | 44 | |
| 12 | Hawthorn | 22 | 10 | 11 | 1 | 1864 | 2055 | 90.7 | 42 | |
| 13 | Collingwood | 22 | 9 | 12 | 1 | 1944 | 1963 | 99.0 | 38 | |
| 14 | Fremantle | 22 | 8 | 14 | 0 | 1607 | 2160 | 74.4 | 32 | |
| 15 | North Melbourne | 22 | 6 | 16 | 0 | 1983 | 2264 | 87.6 | 24 | |
| 16 | Carlton | 22 | 6 | 16 | 0 | 1594 | 2038 | 78.2 | 24 | |
| 17 | Gold Coast | 22 | 6 | 16 | 0 | 1756 | 2311 | 76.0 | 24 | |
| 18 | Brisbane Lions | 22 | 5 | 17 | 0 | 1877 | 2526 | 74.3 | 20 | |

Source: AFL
Rules for classification: 1) points; 2) percentage; 3) number of points for.
(P) Premiers

=== Ladder breakdown by opposition ===
| Opponent | Played | Won | Lost | Drew | Premiership points | Points for | Points against | Percentage (%) |
|---|---|---|---|---|---|---|---|---|
| Western Bulldogs | 1 | 1 | 0 | 0 | 4 | 113 | 56 | 201.89% |
| Essendon | 1 | 1 | 0 | 0 | 4 | 112 | 74 | 151.35% |
| Gold Coast | 1 | 1 | 0 | 0 | 4 | 122 | 87 | 140.23% |
| Port Adelaide | 1 | 1 | 0 | 0 | 4 | 88 | 65 | 135.38% |
| St Kilda | 2 | 2 | 0 | 0 | 8 | 216 | 162 | 133.33% |
| Carlton | 2 | 2 | 0 | 0 | 8 | 176 | 146 | 120.55% |
| Brisbane Lions | 1 | 0 | 1 | 0 | 4 | 104 | 91 | 114.29% |
| West Coast | 1 | 0 | 1 | 0 | 4 | 99 | 96 | 103.13% |
| Adelaide | 2 | 1 | 1 | 0 | 4 | 177 | 182 | 97.25% |
| Collingwood | 1 | 1 | 1 | 0 | 4 | 187 | 199 | 93.67% |
| Fremantle | 1 | 0 | 1 | 0 | 0 | 104 | 106 | 98.11% |
| Hawthorn | 1 | 0 | 1 | 0 | 0 | 91 | 94 | 96.81% |
| North Melbourne | 1 | 0 | 1 | 0 | 0 | 90 | 104 | 86.54% |
| Richmond | 1 | 0 | 1 | 0 | 0 | 75 | 88 | 85.23% |
| Geelong | 1 | 0 | 1 | 0 | 0 | 97 | 126 | 76.98% |
| Greater Western Sydney | 1 | 0 | 1 | 0 | 0 | 62 | 97 | 63.92% |
| Sydney | 1 | 0 | 1 | 0 | 0 | 50 | 85 | 58.82% |
| Total | 22 | 12 | 10 | 0 | 48 | 2035 | 2034 | 105.22% |

== Tribunal/Match Review Panel cases ==
| Player | Round | Charge category (level) | Verdict | Early plea | Result | Victim | Club | Ref(s) |
|---|---|---|---|---|---|---|---|---|
| Jesse Hogan | JLT Community Series | Making contact with umpire | Guilty | Yes | $1000 | Ben Ryan | —N/a | |
| Bernie Vince | Round 1 | Striking | Guilty | Yes | 1 match | Nathan Wright | St Kilda | |
| Jordan Lewis | Round 2 | Striking | Guilty | Yes | 3 matches | Patrick Cripps | Carlton | |
| Jesse Hogan | Round 2 | Striking | Guilty | Yes | 2 matches | Sam Rowe | Carlton | |
| Nathan Jones | Round 5 | Involved in a melee (third offence) | Guilty | Yes | $2500 | —N/a | Richmond | |
| Jack Viney | Round 5 | Involved in a melee (third offence) | Guilty | Yes | $2500 | —N/a | Richmond | |
| Bernie Vince | Round 8 | Making contact with umpire | Guilty | Yes | $1000 | Craig Fleer | —N/a | |
| Christian Salem | Round 9 | Striking | Guilty | Yes | 1 match | Shaun Higgins | North Melbourne | |
| Neville Jetta | Round 13 | Wrestling (first offence) | Guilty | Yes | $1000 | Jake Stringer | Western Bulldogs | |
| Tomas Bugg | Round 15 | Striking | Guilty | —N/a | 6 matches | Callum Mills | Sydney | |
| Bernie Vince | Round 17 | Striking | Guilty | Yes | 2 matches | Eddie Betts | Adelaide | |
| Bernie Vince | Round 17 | Forceful contact from front-on | Guilty | Yes | $1000 | Richard Douglas | Adelaide | |
| Bernie Vince | Round 22 | Striking | Guilty | Yes | $1500 | Dayne Beams | Brisbane Lions | |
| Jake Melksham | Round 22 | Misconduct | Guilty | Yes | $1000 | —N/a | —N/a | |

== Awards ==
=== Brownlow Medal tally ===
| Player | 3 vote games | 2 vote games | 1 vote games | Total votes |
|---|---|---|---|---|
| Clayton Oliver | 2 | 1 | 4 | 12 |
| Jack Viney | 3 | 0 | 0 | 9 |
| Tom McDonald | 1 | 3 | 0 | 9 |
| Michael Hibberd | 2 | 0 | 1 | 7 |
| Nathan Jones | 1 | 2 | 0 | 7 |
| Cameron Pedersen | 1 | 0 | 1 | 4 |
| Jesse Hogan | 1 | 0 | 0 | 3 |
| Christian Salem | 1 | 0 | 0 | 3 |
| Dom Tyson | 0 | 1 | 1 | 3 |
| Max Gawn | 0 | 1 | 1 | 3 |
| Jeff Garlett | 0 | 1 | 0 | 2 |
| Jordan Lewis | 0 | 1 | 0 | 2 |
| Christian Petracca | 0 | 1 | 0 | 2 |
| Oscar McDonald | 0 | 0 | 1 | 1 |
| Jack Watts | 0 | 0 | 1 | 1 |
| Total | 12 | 11 | 10 | 68 |

=== Keith 'Bluey' Truscott Medal tally (top 10) ===
| Position | Player | Votes |
|---|---|---|
| 1st | Clayton Oliver | 530 |
| 2nd | Jack Viney | 346 |
| =3rd | Nathan Jones | 327 |
| =3rd | Jordan Lewis | 327 |
| 5th | Neville Jetta | 321 |
| 6th | Michael Hibberd | 318 |
| 7th | Christian Petracca | 302 |
| 8th | Jeff Garlett | 284 |
| 9th | Tom McDonald | 278 |
| 10th | Dom Tyson | 275 |

Keith 'Bluey' Truscott Trophy – Clayton Oliver

Sid Anderson Memorial Trophy (second in the best and fairest) – Jack Viney

Ron Barassi Snr Memorial Trophy (third in the best and fairest) – Nathan Jones and Jordan Lewis

Ivor Warne-Smith Memorial Trophy (fourth in the best and fairest) – not awarded

Dick Taylor Memorial Trophy (fifth in the best and fairest) – Neville Jetta

Harold Ball Memorial Trophy (best young player) – Clayton Oliver

Troy Broadbridge Trophy (highest polling MFC player in the Casey best and fairest) – Jack Trengove

Ron Barassi Jnr. Leadership Award – Jack Viney

Ian Ridley Club Ambassador Award – Neville Jetta

Norm Smith Memorial Trophy (coach's award) – Neville Jetta

James McDonald Trophy (best team man) – Clayton Oliver

Leading goalkicker award – Jeff Garlett (42 goals)

== Women's team ==
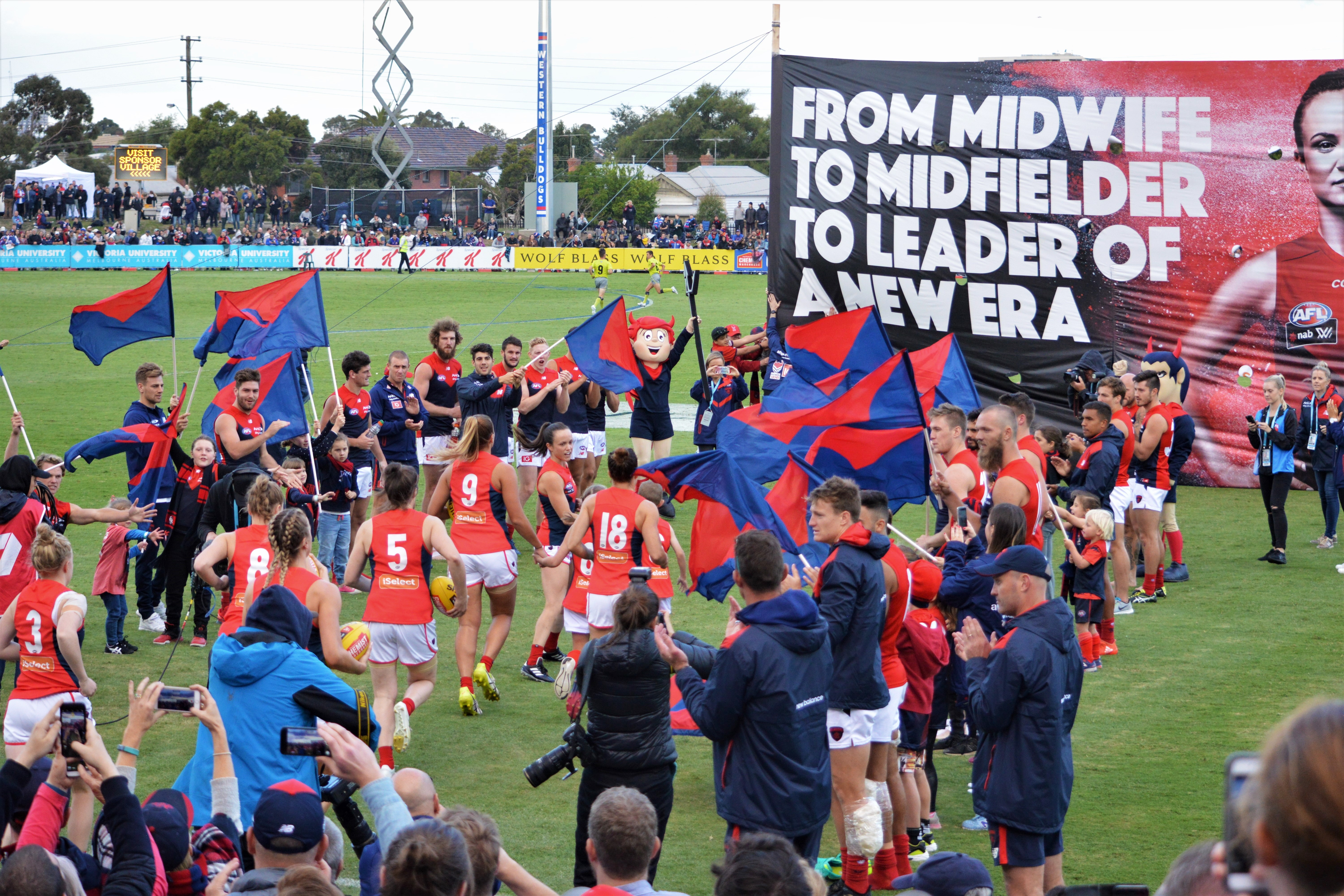
Melbourne's AFL Women's team running out for the round three match against the Western Bulldogs.

Melbourne Football Club (AFL Women's)
| Senior list | | Rookie list | Coaching staff |
|---|---|---|---|
| 1 Elise Strachan (IR); 2 Meg Downie; 3 Emma Humphries; 4 Karen Paxman; 5 Elise O'Dea (vc); 6 Daisy Pearce (c); 7 Deanna Berry; 8 Sarah Lampard; 9 Alyssa Mifsud; 10 Sarah Jolly; 11 Laura Duryea; 13 Katherine Smith; 14 Lily Mithen | 15 Lauren Pearce; 16 Aliesha Newman; 18 Melissa Hickey (vc); 19 Jasmine Grierson; 20 Shelley Scott; 22 Pepa Randall; 23 Stephanie De Bortoli; 24 Brooke Patterson; 25 Maddie Boyd; 28 Jessica Anderson; 30 Richelle Cranston; 36 Ainslie Kemp; 44 Mia-Rae Clifford | 21 Harriet Cordner; 35 Cat Phillips | Head coach: Mick Stinear; Assistant coaches: Shaun O'Loughlin; Sam Radford; Legend: (c) Captain(s); (vc) Vice-captain(s); Long-term injury list; (IR) Injury replacement; Updated: 14 February 2017; Source(s): Players, Coaches |

=== Fixture ===
==== Round 1 ====
Round 1
Sunday, 5 February (5:05 pm) | Melbourne | def. by | Brisbane | Casey Fields (crowd: 6,500) | Report
0.3 (3); 1.4 (10); 1.4 (10); 1.4 (10) | Q1; Q2; Q3; Final | 0.0 (0); 2.0 (12); 2.1 (13); 4.1 (25) | Television broadcast: Fox Footy
Grierson | Goals | McCarthy, Frederick-Traub, Campbell, Gibson
Paxman, O'Dea, Pearce, Duryea, Scott | Best | Virgo, Bates, Randall, Ashmore, Gibson
Nil | Injuries | Stanton (shoulder)
League best and fairest votes: Elise O'Dea (Melbourne) 3 votes, Kaitlyn Ashmore (Brisbane) 2 votes, Tayla Harris (Brisbane) 1 vote; Record: 0 wins, 1 loss, 0 draws (40.00%); Ladder position: 5th

==== Round 2 ====
Round 2
Saturday, 11 February (7:35 pm) | Collingwood | def. by | Melbourne | IKON Park (crowd: 6,916) | Report
3.0 (18); 4.1 (25); 4.1 (25); 4.1 (25) | Q1; Q2; Q3; Final | 1.0 (6); 1.0 (6); 5.1 (31); 7.2 (44) | Television broadcast: Seven Network
Edwards, Hope, Grant, Cameron | Goals | Phillips 2, Anderson, Paxman, Mifsud, Scott, Jolly
Barden, D'Arcy, Eva, Grant, Chiocci | Best | Paxman, Phillips, D. Pearce, O'Dea, Mithen
Nil | Injuries | Downie (concussion)
Nil | Reports | Nil
League best and fairest votes: Alyssa Mifsud (Melbourne) 3 votes, Steph Chiocci (Collingwood) 2 votes, Elise O'Dea (Melbourne) 1 vote; Record: 1 win, 1 loss, 0 draws (108.00%); Ladder position: 5th

==== Round 3 ====
Round 3
Saturday, 18 February (7:35 pm) | Western Bulldogs | def. by | Melbourne | Whitten Oval (crowd: 8,000) | Report
1.3 (9); 1.3 (9); 3.4 (22); 4.5 (29) | Q1; Q2; Q3; Final | 1.1 (7); 3.5 (23); 5.7 (37); 6.7 (43) | Television broadcast: Seven Network
McLeod, Wildes, Clarkson | Goals | Mifsud 3, Berry, Cordner, Hickey
Blackburn, Kearney, Scott, Wildes | Best | O'Dea, D. Pearce, Mifsud, Hickey, Paxman, Mithen
Nil | Injuries | L. Pearce (shin)
Nil | Reports | Nil
League best and fairest votes: Karen Paxman (Melbourne) 3 votes, Daisy Pearce (Melbourne) 2 votes, Ellie Blackburn (Western Bulldogs) 1 vote; Record: 2 wins, 1 loss, 0 draws (122.78%); Ladder position: 4th

==== Round 4 ====
Round 4
Saturday, 25 February (11:35 am) | Melbourne | def. | Carlton | Casey Fields (crowd: 3,965) | Report
0.1 (1); 3.2 (20); 5.6 (36); 6.6 (42) | Q1; Q2; Q3; Final | 0.1 (1); 2.3 (15); 2.5 (17); 5.6 (36) | Television broadcast: Fox Footy
Mifsud 2, O'Dea, Berry, Scott, Cranston | Goals | Ayre 2, Vescio, Sheirlaw, Jackobsson
D. Pearce, O'Dea, Paxman, Mithen, Mifsud | Best | S. Hosking, Exon, Vescio, Ayre
Paxman (hamstring), Scott (shoulder) | Injuries | Nil
O'Dea (rough conduct) | Reports | Nil
League best and fairest votes: Karen Paxman (Melbourne) 3 votes, Elise O'Dea (Melbourne) 2 votes, Bella Ayre (Carlton) 1 vote; Record: 3 wins, 1 loss, 0 draws (120.87%); Ladder position: 3rd

==== Round 5 ====
Round 5
Friday, 3 March (5:05 pm) | Greater Western Sydney | def. | Melbourne | Blacktown ISP Oval (crowd: 2,000) | Report
2.1 (13); 2.1 (13); 3.1 (19); 3.2 (20) | Q1; Q2; Q3; Final | 0.1 (1); 0.3 (3); 1.4 (10); 1.9 (15) | Television broadcast: Fox Footy
Barclay, Schmidt, Beeson | Goals | Phillips
Dal Pos, Swanson, Collier, Williams, Barclay | Best | Paxman, D. Pearce, Mithen
Nil | Injuries | Newman (corked)
Nil | Reports | Nil
League best and fairest votes: Jessica Dal Pos (Greater Western Sydney) 3 votes, Louise Stephenson (Greater Western Sydney) 2 votes, Karen Paxman (Melbourne) 1 vote; Record: 3 wins, 2 losses, 0 draws (114.07%); Ladder position: 4th

==== Round 6 ====
Round 6
Saturday, 11 March (5:40 pm) | Adelaide | def. by | Melbourne | TIO Stadium (crowd: 5,100) | Report
2.1 (13); 3.1 (19); 3.1 (19); 5.2 (32) | Q1; Q2; Q3; Final | 0.0 (0); 2.1 (13); 4.3 (27); 5.4 (34) | Television broadcast: Seven Network
Riley, Bevan, Randall, Gibson, Perkins | Goals | Berry, D. Pearce, Mifsud, Scott, Newman
Foley, Bevan, Randall, Radan, Phillips | Best | D. Pearce, Newman, Smith, Berry
Nil | Injuries | Nil
Nil | Reports | Nil
League best and fairest votes: Daisy Pearce (Melbourne) 3 votes, Erin Phillips (Adelaide) 2 votes, Courtney Cramey (Adelaide) 1 vote; Record: 4 wins, 2 losses, 0 draws (112.57%); Ladder position: 3rd

==== Round 7 ====
Round 7
Saturday, 18 March (4:35 pm) | Melbourne | def. | Fremantle | Casey Fields (crowd: 2,500 (est)) | Report
5.0 (30); 8.0 (48); 10.0 (60); 11.4 (70) | Q1; Q2; Q3; Final | 2.0 (12); 2.3 (15); 2.4 (16); 2.4 (16) | Television broadcast: Fox Footy
Berry 2, Mifsud 2, Scott 2, Phillips 2, Paxman, Newman, Humphries | Goals | Antonio, Houghton
Pearce, O'Dea, Mithen, Phillips, Grierson, Paxman, Humphries | Best | Hooker, Houghton, Lavell, Filocamo
Nil | Injuries | Angel (knee)
Nil | Reports | Nil
League best and fairest votes: Karen Paxman (Melbourne) 3 votes, Daisy Pearce (Melbourne) 2 votes, Elise O'Dea (Melbourne) 1 vote; Record: 5 wins, 2 losses, 0 draws (141.0%); Ladder position: 3rd

=== Ladder ===
| Pos | Team | Pld | W | L | D | PF | PA | PP | Pts | Qualification |
|---|---|---|---|---|---|---|---|---|---|---|
| 1 | Brisbane | 7 | 6 | 0 | 1 | 224 | 148 | 151.4 | 26 | Grand Final |
| 2 | Adelaide (P) | 7 | 5 | 2 | 0 | 291 | 185 | 157.3 | 20 | Grand Final |
| 3 | Melbourne | 7 | 5 | 2 | 0 | 258 | 183 | 141.0 | 20 | |
| 4 | Carlton | 7 | 3 | 3 | 1 | 261 | 232 | 112.5 | 14 | |
| 5 | Collingwood | 7 | 3 | 4 | 0 | 224 | 262 | 85.5 | 12 | |
| 6 | Western Bulldogs | 7 | 2 | 5 | 0 | 237 | 232 | 102.2 | 8 | |
| 7 | Fremantle | 7 | 1 | 5 | 1 | 191 | 298 | 64.1 | 6 | |
| 8 | Greater Western Sydney | 7 | 1 | 5 | 1 | 157 | 303 | 51.8 | 6 | |

Source: AFL.com.au
Rules for classification: 1) points; 2) percentage; 3) number of points for.
(P) Premiers

=== Tribunal and match review panel cases ===
| Player | Round | Charge category | Verdict | Early plea | Result | Victim | Club | Ref(s) |
|---|---|---|---|---|---|---|---|---|
| Richelle Cranston | Round 1 | Front-on contact | Guilty | Yes | 1 match | Jamie Stanton | Brisbane | |
| Elise O'Dea | Round 4 | Rough conduct | Not guilty | N/A | N/A | Sarah Hosking | Carlton | |
