= Emma Humphries =

Emma Humphries may refer to:

- Emma Humphries (Australian footballer) (born 1995), Australian rules footballer who played in the AFL Women's
- Emma Humphries (New Zealand footballer) (born 1986), association football player, coach, and administrator
