= Shaun Smith (Australian footballer) =

Australian rules footballer (born 1969)

Personal information
- Full name: Shaun Smith
- Born: 22 June 1969 (age 57)
- Original team: Ainslie / Werribee
- Height: 184 cm (6 ft 0 in)
- Weight: 90 kg (198 lb)

Playing career^{1}
Years	Club	Games (Goals)
1987–1992	North Melbourne	47 (38)
1995–1998	Melbourne	62 (96)
Total		109 (134)
- ^{1} Playing statistics correct to the end of 1998.

Career highlights
- Mark of the year 1996, Mark of the century

Shaun Smith (born 22 June 1969) is a former Australian rules footballer in the VFL/AFL.

Originally from the Ainslie Football Club in the Australian Capital Territory, but recruited from Werribee and debuting in the Victorian Football League in 1987, Smith is best known for his incredible leap and ability to take spectacular marks or speckies.

His high leaping play enabled him to hold down a key position whilst being only 184 cm and is sometimes compared to Russell Robertson.

Smith debuted with the North Melbourne Football Club in 1987 and was delisted due to a string of injuries at the end of 1992 after 47 games and 38 goals.

He played for Werribee in 1994, and had a dominant season there. He was one of the Association's leading goalkickers for the season, finished third in the J. J. Liston Trophy count, and continued his reputation for taking high marks. He was consequently recruited back to the AFL by Melbourne for the 1995 season.

By far Smith's most successful and consistent season was at the Melbourne Football Club in 1995.

His 1995 Mark of the Year, a chest mark over teammate Garry Lyon in the goal square against the Brisbane Bears at the Gabba, was named the Mark of the Century, superseding Gary Ablett Sr's famous, though controversial, mark a year earlier. In the same year, he managed an AFL-career-best 51 goals.

Injury plagued the rest of his career at the Demons until he was finally delisted in 1998, finishing his career at the Werribee Football Club in 2004.

Shaun's son Joel was signed by the Demons for the 2016 season as a Category B rookie under the father–son rule, and his daughter Amy is currently listed with North Melbourne in the AFLW, recruited in 2020 as the club's first father–daughter pick.
