= Tim Smith (Australian footballer) =

Australian rules footballer

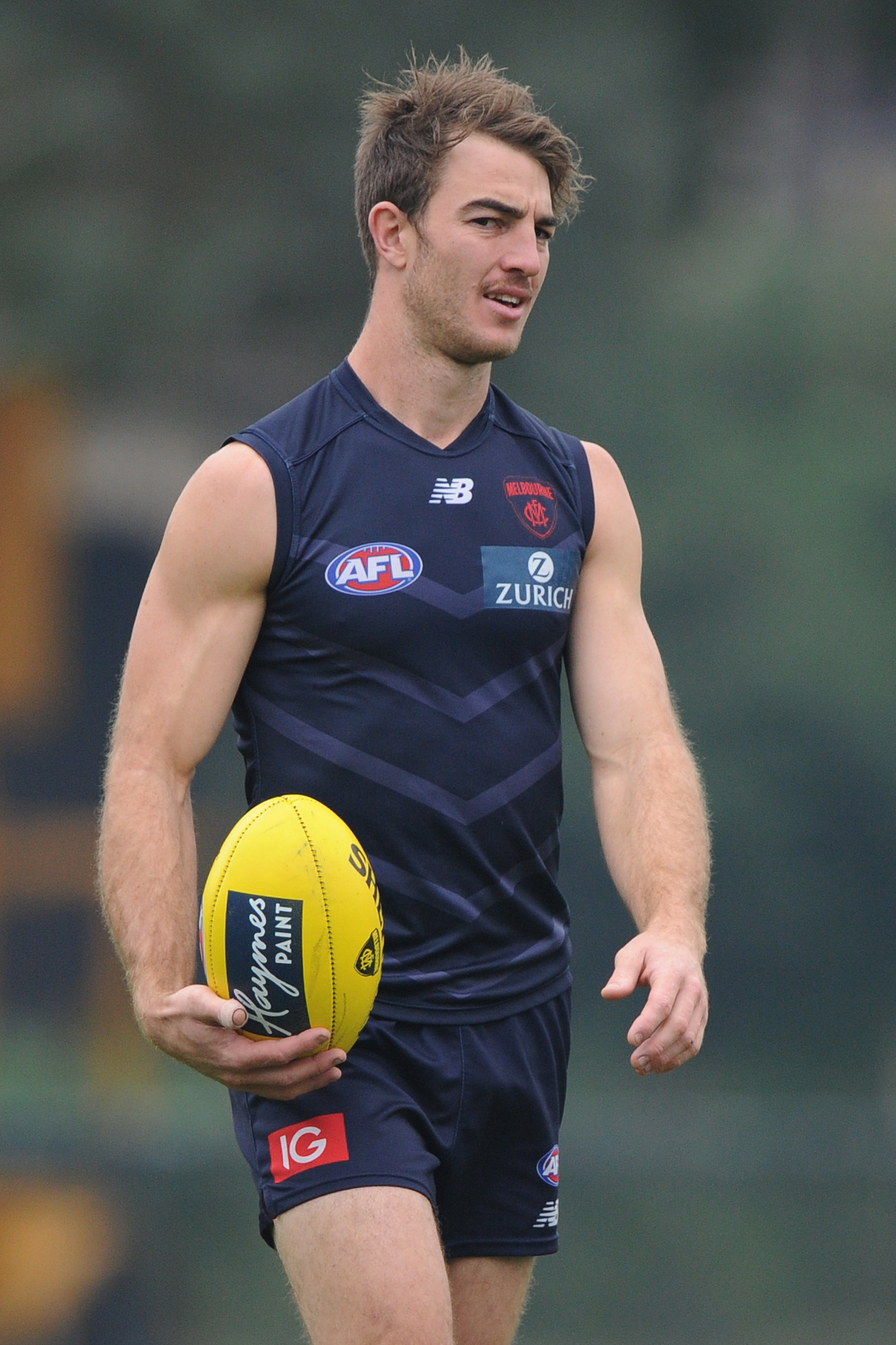
- Smith with Melbourne in April 2018

Personal information
- Full name: Timothy Smith
- Nickname: Bull
- Born: 20 February 1991 (age 35)
- Original team: Casey (VFL)
- Draft: No. 25, 2017 rookie draft
- Debut: Round 3, 2017, Melbourne vs. Geelong, at Etihad Stadium
- Height: 192 cm (6 ft 4 in)
- Weight: 95 kg (209 lb)
- Position: Forward

Club information
- Current club: Melbourne
- Number: 38

Playing career^{1}
Years	Club	Games (Goals)
2017–2019	Melbourne	13 (11)
- ^{1} Playing statistics correct to the end of 2019.

Timothy Smith (born 20 February 1991) is a former Australian rules footballer playing for the Melbourne Football Club in the Australian Football League (AFL). A forward, 1.92 metres (6 ft 4 in) tall and weighing 95 kilograms (209 lb), Smith plays primarily as the full-forward or centre half-forward. After spending five seasons with the Casey in the Victorian Football League, Dave Zennaro convinced him to take the next step in which he garnered team of the year honours and state representation, he was recruited by the Melbourne Football Club in the 2017 rookie draft and made his AFL debut in the 2017 season.

== Pre-AFL career ==
Playing with the Upper Ferntree Gully Football Club in the Eastern Football League, Smith won a senior premiership with the club at nineteen years of age, he then joined the Casey in the Victorian Football League (VFL) prior to the 2012 season. At the end of the 2015 season, experienced Casey players, Evan Panozza, Mitch Gent and Will Petropoulos left the club, and Smith consequently became the oldest player on the list at twenty-five years of age and the most experienced with fifty-two games. He was named the vice-captain for the 2016 season, and after playing as the key forward for a majority of his career at Casey, he played the 2016 season as a smaller forward due to Melbourne-listed players Chris Dawes, Liam Hulett and Sam Weideman featuring as the key forwards for the season. His new role saw him kick a career best thirty-one goals for the year and as a result, he became Casey's leading goalkicker and finished sixth overall in the league.

After playing nineteen matches for the year, he helped the club secure the minor premiership and his performance in the preliminary final—which garnered a game-high three goals—saw the club qualify for the grand final for the first time since 1999. Although Casey headed into the grand final as heavy favourites and he kicked three goals in the match, Casey ultimately lost the grand final to Footscray by thirty-one points at Etihad Stadium. His performances during the year led to state honours when he represented Victoria against South Australia and he was named as the centre half-forward in the VFL team of the year. At the conclusion of the season, he was considered a "roughie" to be recruited in the upcoming AFL draft by Cranbourne Leader journalist, Paul Amy, due to his breakout season in the VFL.

== AFL career ==
After his emergence for the Casey Scorpions in the VFL, Smith was recruited by the Melbourne Football Club (Casey's affiliate team) with their second selection and twenty-fifth overall in the 2017 rookie draft. He was predicted by AFL Media reporter, Dinny Navaratnam, as the draftee who would have the greatest impact at Melbourne for the 2017 season. After "impressing" in VFL pre-season matches, in which Casey-coach, Justin Plapp, said he was playing at an "exceptional level", he made his AFL debut in the twenty-nine point loss against Geelong at Etihad Stadium in round three, in which he kicked his first AFL goal. Smith retired at the conclusion of the 2019 season.

== Statistics ==
Statistics are correct to the end of the 2019 season

Legend
G	Goals	K	Kicks	D	Disposals	T	Tackles
B	Behinds	H	Handballs	M	Marks

Season	Team	No.	Games	Totals							Averages (per game)						
Season	Team	No.	Games	G	B	K	H	D	M	T	G	B	K	H	D	M	T
2017	Melbourne	38	2	1	2	7	3	10	3	6	0.5	1.0	3.5	1.5	5.0	1.5	3.0
2018	Melbourne	38	4	3	3	21	30	51	14	24	0.8	0.8	5.3	7.5	12.8	3.5	6.0
2019	Melbourne	38	7	7	6	42	32	74	24	19	1.0	0.9	6.0	4.6	10.6	3.4	2.7
Career			13	11	11	70	65	135	41	49	0.8	0.8	5.4	5.0	10.4	3.2	3.8
