= Mitch Hannan =

Australian rules footballer (born 1994)

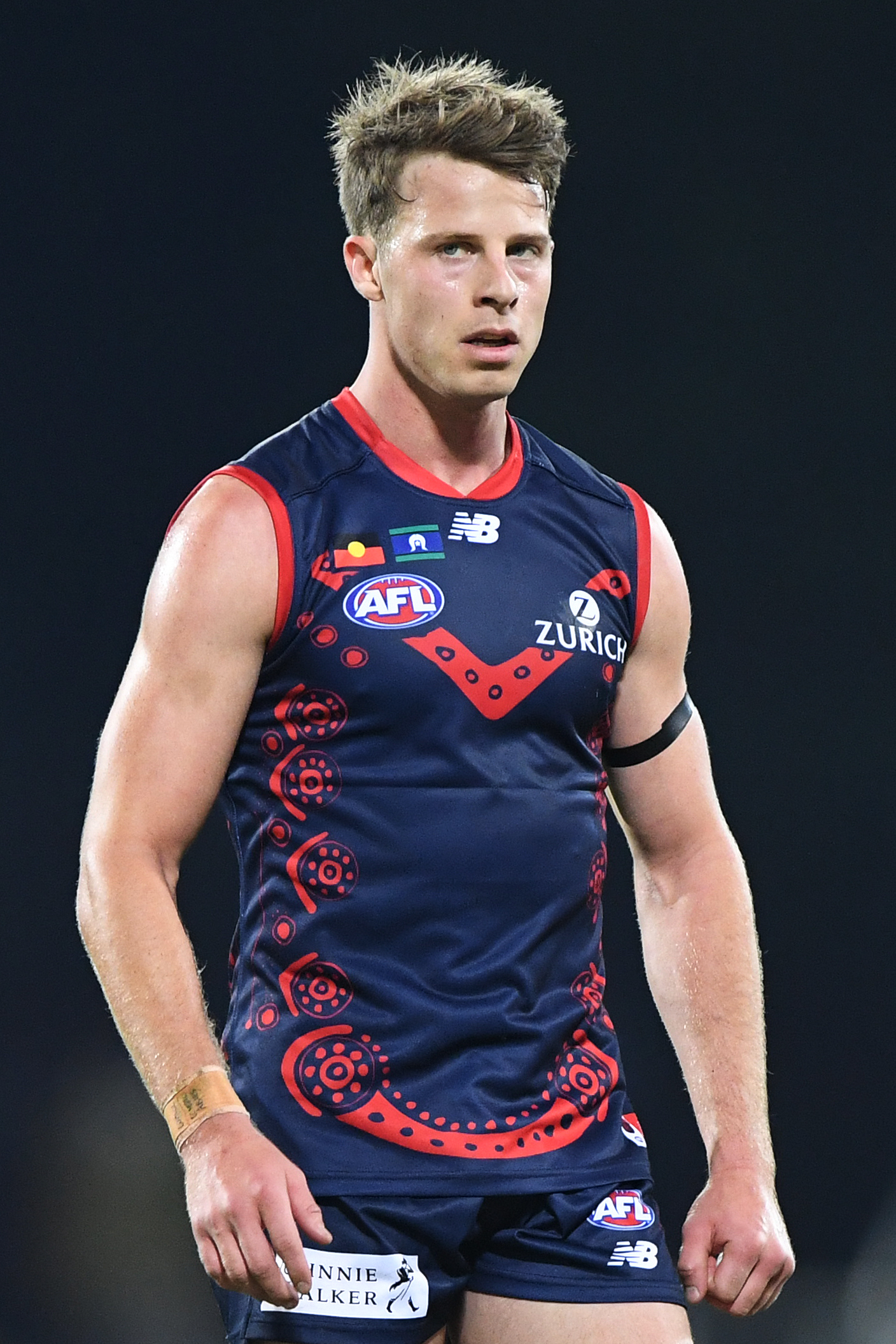
- Hannan playing for Melbourne in June 2019

Personal information
- Full name: Mitchell Hannan
- Nickname: The Shlong
- Born: 9 March 1994 (age 32)
- Original team: Footscray (VFL)
- Draft: No. #69 2016 national draft
- Debut: Round 1, 2017, Melbourne vs. St Kilda, at Etihad Stadium
- Height: 190 cm (6 ft 3 in)
- Weight: 87 kg (192 lb)
- Position: Forward

Playing career
Years	Club	Games (Goals)
2017–2020	Melbourne	50 (55)
2021–2023	Western Bulldogs	26 (19)
Total		76 (74)

Mitchell Hannan (born 9 March 1994) is a former professional Australian rules footballer who played for the Western Bulldogs and Melbourne in the Australian Football League (AFL), having been initially drafted to the Melbourne Football Club. A forward, 1.90 metres (6 ft 3 in) tall and weighing 87 kilograms (192 lb), Hannan has the ability to play as a forward and in the midfield. After failing to play in the TAC Cup as a junior, he joined the St Bernard's Football Club in the Victorian Amateur Football Association (VAFA) where he won a premiership and the best on ground in the 2015 VAFA Grand Final. The next year, he played with Footscray in the Victorian Football League (VFL) where he won his second premiership in as many years. His performances in the VAFA and VFL saw him recruited by the Melbourne Football Club in the 2016 AFL draft and he made his debut in the opening round of the 2017 season. He was a delisted at the end of the 2023 AFL Season.

== Pre-AFL career ==
Originally from Gisborne, Victoria, Hannan failed to make the Calder Cannons and Bendigo Pioneers sides in the TAC Cup before leaving his junior club, Woodend, to join the St Bernard's Football Club in the premier division of the Victorian Amateur Football Association (VAFA). He won a premiership with the club in 2015 and was named the best player on the ground in the grand final, winning the Jock Nelson Medal. He played four matches for Footscray in the Victorian Football League (VFL) in the same season, before playing solely for the club in the 2016 season. He rose to prominence during the season when he took a "ripping specky" during the opening round match against the Northern Blues, which was described as "Gary Moorcroft like", whereby Moorcroft's 2001 mark is considered one of the greatest VFL/AFL marks in history and the best by ABC journalist, Dean Bilton.

Playing fourteen matches for the season, his performances in the final month led to Footscray coach, Ashley Hansen, declaring he had the potential to be drafted to the AFL. He was pivotal in Footscray's semi final win against Essendon according to Maribyrnong Leader reporter, Tim Michell, where he kicked three goals in the final quarter and "came to life in the last term to inspire his side". He played in his second premiership in two years when Footscray defeated the Casey by thirty-three points at Etihad Stadium in the VFL Grand Final.

== AFL career ==
Hannan was recruited by the Melbourne Football Club with their first selection and forty-sixth overall in the 2016 national draft. A shoulder injury halted his pre-season and he was considered unlikely to make his debut early in the season. He did not feature in any matches during the JLT Community Series and despite this, he made his debut in the opening round of the 2017 season in the thirty point win against St Kilda at Etihad Stadium, in which he kicked two goals. He played the opening four matches before he was omitted for the round five match against Richmond at the Melbourne Cricket Ground, and missed just the one match, returning for the thirty-eight point win against Essendon at Etihad Stadium.

In his eighth AFL match, he kicked three goals and recorded fourteen disposals and five marks in the fourteen point loss to North Melbourne at the Melbourne Cricket Ground in round nine to be named in AFL Media's team of the week. He played every match until the round twenty game against Greater Western Sydney at UNSW Canberra Oval, before returning for the last three matches of the year to finish with twenty games in total in his debut season. At the end of the season, he was the Melbourne nominee for the AFL Players Association (AFLPA) best first year player award and finished fourteenth in Melbourne's best and fairest with 216 votes.

At the conclusion of the 2020 AFL season, Hannan was traded to the Western Bulldogs. He made his debut for the Bulldogs in the Round 7 match against Richmond. He made the grand final in his first year, but was beaten by his old team, Melbourne by 74 points.

== Statistics ==
Statistics are correct to the end of round 9, 2021

Legend
G	Goals	K	Kicks	D	Disposals	T	Tackles
B	Behinds	H	Handballs	M	Marks

Season	Team	No.	Games	Totals							Averages (per game)						
Season	Team	No.	Games	G	B	K	H	D	M	T	G	B	K	H	D	M	T
2017	Melbourne	19	20	22	10	138	110	248	49	60	1.1	0.5	6.9	5.5	12.4	2.5	3.0
2018	Melbourne	19	15	22	16	112	61	173	50	33	1.5	1.1	7.5	4.1	11.5	3.3	2.2
2019	Melbourne	19	6	4	1	32	29	61	18	8	0.7	0.2	5.3	4.8	10.2	3.0	1.3
2020 (Note: The 2020 season was played with 17 home-and-away matches per team (down from 22) and 16-minute quarters with time on (down from 20-minute quarters with time on) due to the impact of the COVID-19 pandemic.)	Melbourne	19	9	7	3	41	31	72	21	15	0.8	0.3	4.6	3.4	8.0	2.3	1.7
2021	Western Bulldogs	29	3	1	2	15	7	22	10	6	0.3	0.7	5.0	2.3	7.3	3.3	2.0
Career			53	56	32	338	238	576	148	122	1.1	0.6	6.4	4.5	10.9	2.8	2.3
