= Joel Smith (footballer, born 1996) =

Australian rules footballer

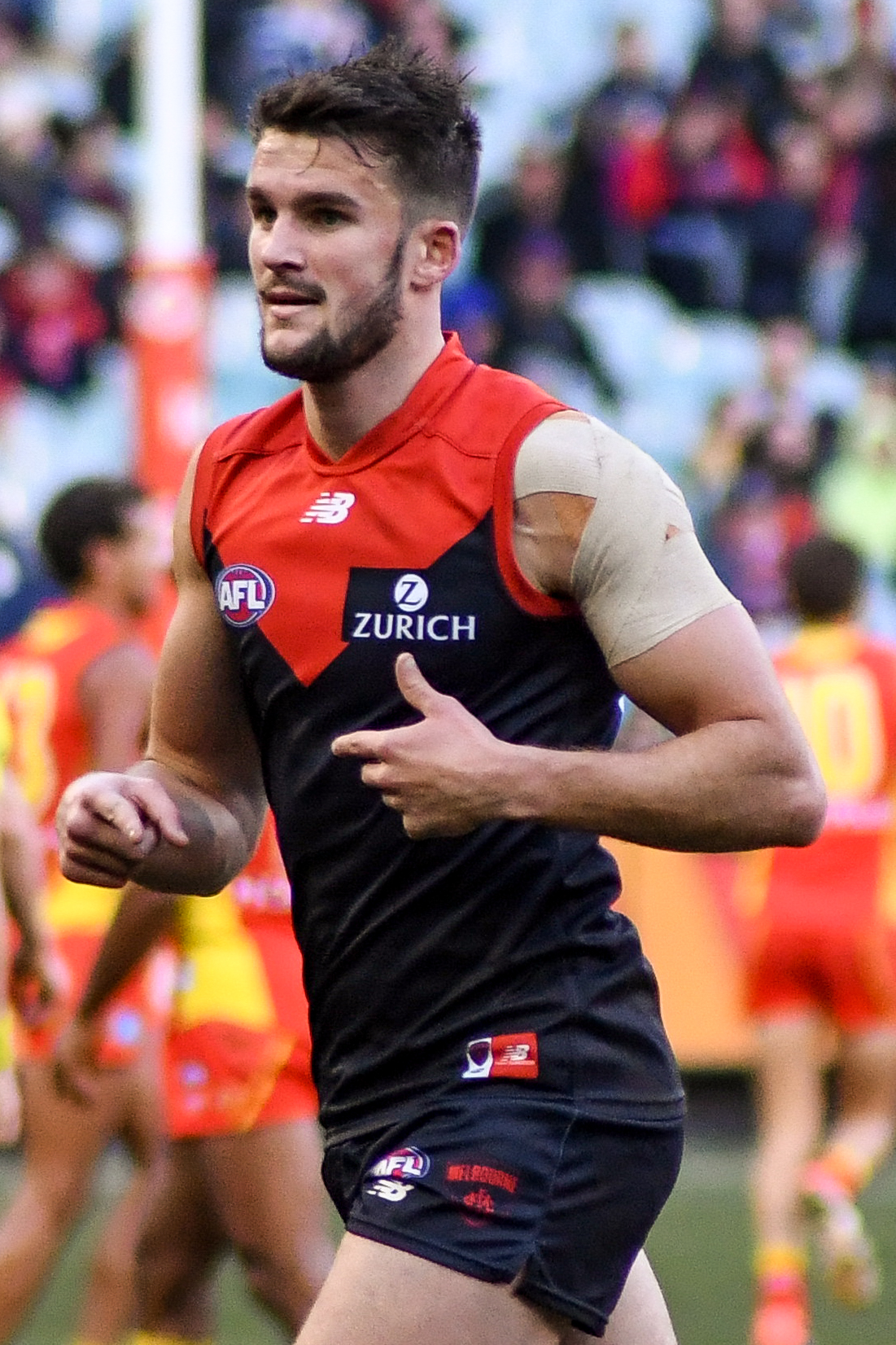
- Smith playing for Melbourne in August 2018

Personal information
- Full name: Joel Smith
- Born: 25 February 1996 (age 30)
- Original team: Maribyrnong Park (EDFL)
- Draft: No. 41, 2016 rookie draft
- Debut: Round 1, 2017, Melbourne vs. St Kilda, at Etihad Stadium
- Height: 191 cm (6 ft 3 in)
- Weight: 90 kg (198 lb)
- Positions: Forward, Defender

Playing career^{1}
Years	Club	Games (Goals)
2016–2024	Melbourne	42 (12)
- ^{1} Playing statistics correct to the end of 2024.

Career highlights
- VFL premiership player: 2022

Joel Smith (born 25 February 1996) is a former professional Australian rules footballer playing for the Melbourne Football Club in the Australian Football League (AFL). The son of former North Melbourne and Melbourne player Shaun Smith, he followed in his father's footsteps when he was recruited by Melbourne in 2015 as a category B rookie.

== Early life ==
Smith played Australian rules football with Taylors Lakes from the under-10 level, where he won two best and fairest awards, before moving to the Maribyrnong Park Football Club for the under-16 season. He then switched sports to basketball and had a successful career, representing Australia at under-19 level and playing with the Geelong Supercats in the South East Australian Basketball League in 2015.

== AFL career ==
Smith was signed by the Melbourne Football Club in October 2015 as a category B rookie and was eligible to join Melbourne's list immediately as he hadn't been registered in an Australian rules football competition for at least three years. He played his first match in the 2016 season in the Victorian Football League (VFL) Development League for Melbourne's affiliate team, the Casey Scorpions; after one match in the development league, he was promoted to the VFL seniors in a 56-point win over Collingwood at Olympic Park Oval in round two. After four matches in the VFL, he was sidelined for over two months due to a groin injury. After returning from injury to the VFL, he played the remainder of the season including the grand final loss against Footscray at Etihad Stadium.

Described as one of the standouts at training during the 2017 pre-season by AFL Media journalist Ben Guthrie, Smith played in the opening two matches of the JLT Community Series. He was forced to miss the week-three match against West Coast at Domain Stadium due to a toe injury. Despite the injury, he was promoted to the senior list in place of Mitch King, who was on the long-term injury list, and made his debut in a 30-point win against St Kilda at Etihad Stadium in the opening round of the season. During the first quarter, he dislocated his shoulder and was forced to miss the remainder of the match.

Smith was provisionally suspended in mid-October 2023 after a drug-test sample he provided after the Demons' win over Hawthorn in round 23 returned a positive result for cocaine. In February 2024, he was accused of trafficking cocaine and was set to face a minimum two-year suspension.

On 1 November 2024, Smith was delisted by the Melbourne Football Club after receiving a four-year and three month ban in connection with five Anti-Doping Violations. Smith’s suspension was agreed upon by the World Anti-Doping Agency (WADA), Sport Integrity Australia (SIA), and the AFL with Smith. Under the terms of the suspension, Smith is prohibited from participating in any sports that have adopted a World Anti-Doping Code compliant anti-doping policy until 9 January 2028.

== Statistics ==
Updated to the end of 2024.

Legend
G	Goals	K	Kicks	D	Disposals	T	Tackles
B	Behinds	H	Handballs	M	Marks

Season	Team	No.	Games	Totals							Averages (per game)						
Season	Team	No.	Games	G	B	K	H	D	M	T	G	B	K	H	D	M	T
2017	Melbourne	44	3	0	0	12	14	26	2	8	0.0	0.0	4.0	4.7	8.7	0.7	2.7
2018	Melbourne	44	8	1	2	46	48	94	29	31	0.1	0.3	5.8	6.0	11.8	3.6	3.9
2019	Melbourne	44	0	–	–	–	–	–	–	–	–	–	–	–	–	–	–
2020	Melbourne	44	7	0	0	23	15	38	9	10	0.0	0.0	3.3	2.1	5.4	1.3	1.4
2021	Melbourne	44	3	0	0	11	9	20	9	4	0.0	0.0	3.7	3.0	6.7	3.0	1.3
2022	Melbourne	44	7	0	0	30	18	48	14	12	0.0	0.0	4.3	2.6	6.9	2.0	1.7
2023	Melbourne	29	14	11	4	59	28	87	37	32	0.8	0.3	4.2	2.0	6.2	2.6	2.3
2024	Melbourne	29	Banned for the 2024 season														
Career			42	12	6	181	132	313	100	97	0.2	0.1	4.3	3.1	7.4	2.4	2.3
