= Aliesha Newman =

Australian rules footballer

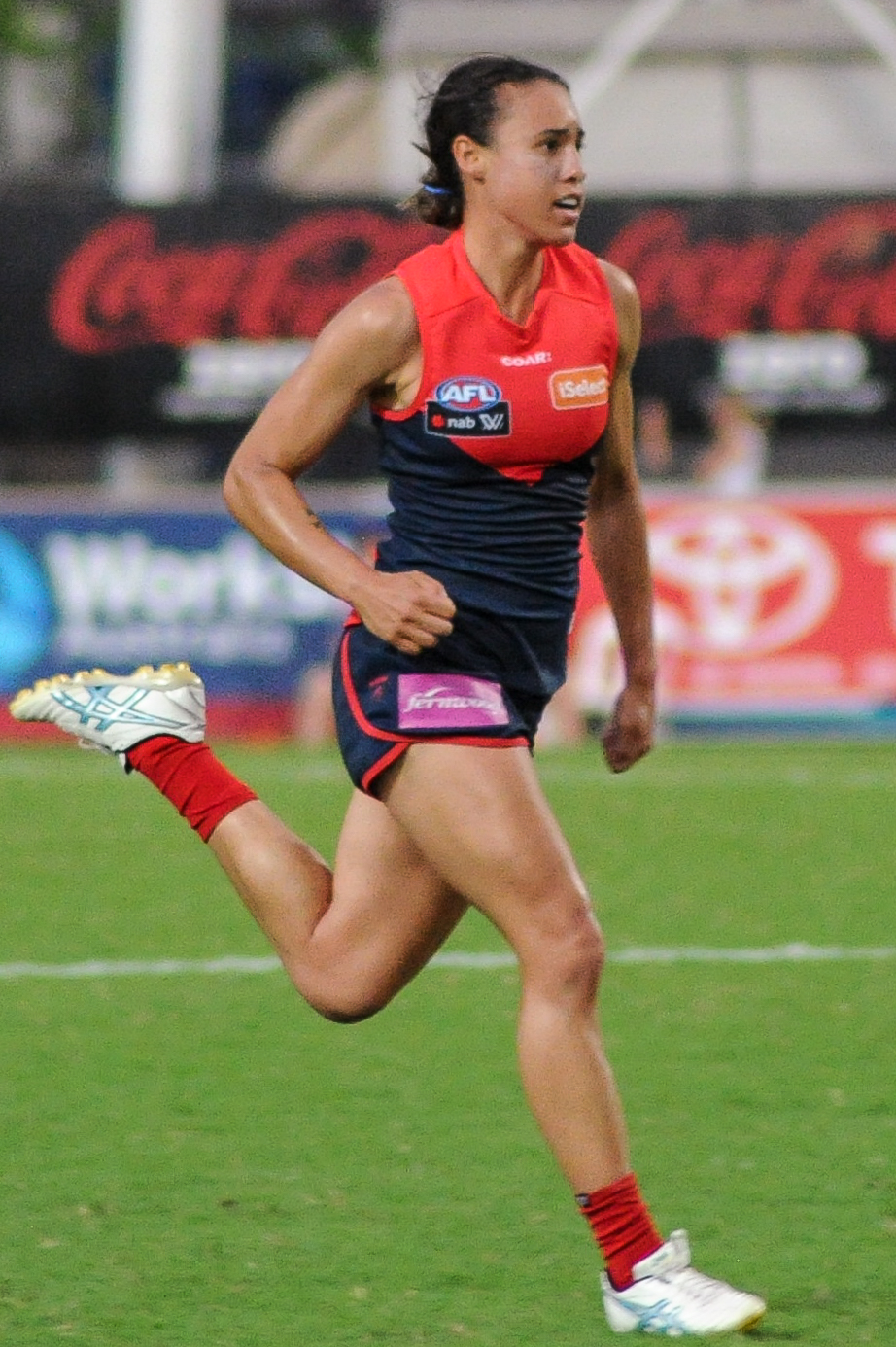
- Newman playing for Melbourne in March 2017

Personal information
- Full name: Aliesha Newman
- Born: 16 September 1995 (age 31); Sunshine, Victoria
- Original team: Wyndhamvale Falcons (WRFL)/Maribyrnong College
- Draft: Free Agent signing
- Debut: Round 1, 2017, Melbourne vs. Brisbane, at Casey Fields
- Height: 160 cm (5 ft 3 in)
- Weight: 58 kg (128 lb)
- Position: Forward

Club information
- Current club: Greater Western Sydney

Playing career^{1}
Years	Club	Games (Goals)
2017–2020	Melbourne	25 (11)
2021–2022 (S6)	Collingwood	14 (5)
2022 (S7)–2023	Sydney	19 (8)
2024–	Greater Western Sydney	0 (0)
Total		58 (24)
- ^{1} Playing statistics correct to the end of the 2023 season.

Career highlights
- Goal of the Year: 2018

Aliesha Newman (born 16 September 1995) is an Australian rules footballer playing for Greater Western Sydney in the AFL Women's (AFLW) competition. She has previously played for Melbourne, Collingwood, and Sydney.

== Early life and education ==
Newman was born in Sunshine, Victoria and is of Indigenous Australian descent.

Aliesha attended Cherry Crescent Pre-School in Braybrook, where she was a contemporary of future North Melbourne AFLW player Jasmine Garner. She later completed her primary education at Iramoo Primary School, before attending Werribee Secondary College and the Maribyrnong College Sports Academy.

During her school years despite being at Maribyrnong for Soccer, Newman festured in the Australian rules side, playing in a Victorian state championship side that was defeated in the final.

Junior sporting career

Newman began her sporting career in athletics with the Werribee Little Athletics Club. She was a member of a relay team alongside future Olympians Morgan Mitchell and Amy Cashin, as well as international model Vanessa Valladeres.

In addition to athletics, Newman played soccer and achieved notable success, winning a National Premier League (NPL) championship with Calder United.

Despite her later involvement in Australian rules football, Newman was initially discouraged from playing the sport. Her mother did not permit her to play due to concerns about her size. However, Newman filled in for three Under 12 matches with Wyndhamvale Football Club at the invitation of her friend Tori, without her mother's knowledge.Western Bulldog Naomi Ferres also featured in this side.

[https://www.sydneyswans.com.au/players/aflw/1459/aliesha-newman

== AFLW career ==
=== Melbourne ===
Newman was recruited by Melbourne as a free agent in October 2016. She made her debut in the fifteen point loss to Brisbane at Casey Fields in the opening round of the 2017 season. She missed the next three matches before returning for the round five match against Greater Western Sydney at Blacktown International Sportspark Oval. She played the remainder of the season to finish with four matches for the year. Melbourne signed Newman for the 2018 season during the trade period in May 2017. Newman was awarded Goal of the Year in 2018 for her goal in round 2 against Adelaide.

=== Collingwood ===
In August 2020, Newman was traded by Melbourne to Collingwood in a three-club deal which involved Richmond.

=== Sydney ===
In May 2022, Newman joined expansion club Sydney. The speedy small forward played 9 games for the club in the inaugural AFLW season as its most experienced player, becoming the first Indigenous AFLW player at each of her three clubs.

In round two of the 2023 season, Newman played her 50th AFLW game when she booted an equal career-high 3 goals against Geelong at North Sydney Oval. She continued to be a regular in the forward line, playing 10 games for the season including kicking a goal in each of the club's first two finals appearances. Newman also designed the Swans' first ever Indigenous Round guernsey unique to AFLW in 2023.

=== Greater Western Sydney ===
Ahead of the 2024 AFL Women's season, Newman was traded to cross-town club Greater Western Sydney along with an exchange of picks.

== Personal life ==
Newman is originally from Braybrook in Melbourne's western suburbs. She is the older sibling of Australian weightlifter Teagan Newman.

== Statistics ==
Statistics are correct to the end of the 2022 (S6) season.

Legend
G	Goals	K	Kicks	D	Disposals	T	Tackles
B	Behinds	H	Handballs	M	Marks

Season	Team	No.	Games	Totals							Averages (per game)							Votes
Season	Team	No.	Games	G	B	K	H	D	M	T	G	B	K	H	D	M	T	Votes
2017	Melbourne	16	4	2	2	15	7	22	6	4	0.5	0.5	3.8	1.8	5.5	1.5	1.0	0
2018	Melbourne	16	7	3	3	36	13	49	10	15	0.4	0.4	5.1	1.9	7.0	1.4	2.1	0
2019	Melbourne	16	7	6	5	43	32	75	16	12	0.9	0.7	6.1	4.6	10.7	2.3	1.7	0
2020	Melbourne	16	7	0	7	30	23	53	5	20	0.0	1.0	4.3	3.3	7.6	0.7	2.9	0
2021	Collingwood	16	7	3	4	26	12	38	7	5	0.4	0.6	3.7	1.7	5.4	1.0	0.7	3
2022 (S6)	Collingwood	16	7	2	1	32	9	41	10	7	0.3	0.1	4.6	1.3	5.9	1.4	1.0	0
Career			48	17	22	182	96	278	54	63	0.4	0.6	4.7	2.5	7.1	1.4	1.6	3
