= Hayley Wildes =

Australian rules footballer (born 1996)

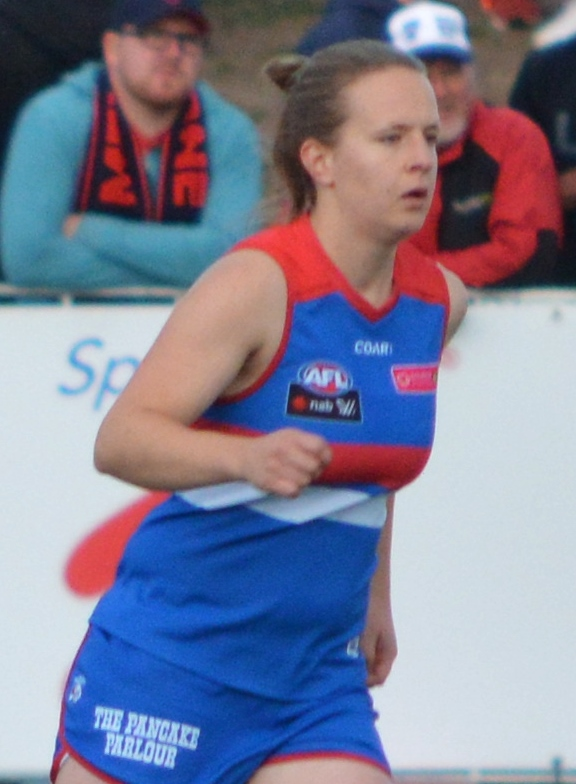
- Wildes playing for the Western Bulldogs in February 2017

Personal information
- Born: 10 September 1996 (age 30)
- Original teams: Cranbourne (VFL Women's) Lang Lang (Ellinbank & District Football League)
- Draft: No. 44, 2016 AFL Women's draft
- Debut: Round 1, 2017, Western Bulldogs vs. Fremantle, at VU Whitten Oval
- Height: 166 cm (5 ft 5 in)
- Position: Defender

Playing career^{1}
Years	Club	Games (Goals)
2017–2019	Western Bulldogs	15 (1)
- ^{1} Playing statistics correct to the end of the 2019 season.

Hayley Wildes (born 10 September 1996) is an Australian rules footballer who played for the Western Bulldogs in the AFL Women's competition. Wildes was drafted by the Western Bulldogs with their six selection and forty-fourth overall in the 2016 AFL Women's draft. She made her debut in the thirty-two point win against Fremantle at VU Whitten Oval in the opening round of the 2017 season. She played every match in her debut season to finish with seven games.
