= Alyssa Mifsud =

Australian rules footballer (born 1994)

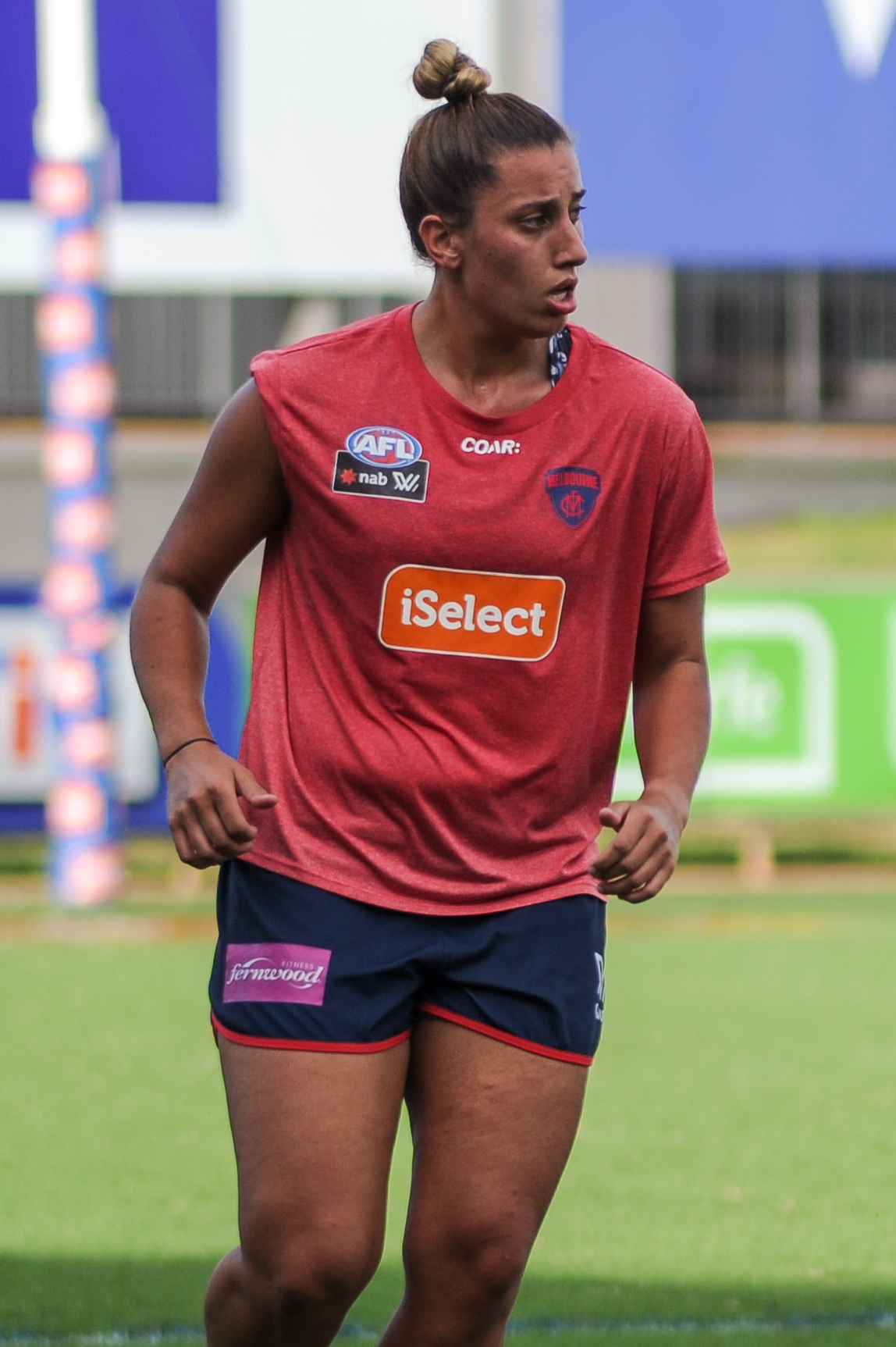
- Mifsud playing for Melbourne in January 2018

Personal information
- Born: 22 December 1994 (age 31)
- Original team: VU Western Spurs (VFL Women's)
- Draft: No. 40, 2016 AFL Women's draft
- Debut: Round 1, 2017, Melbourne vs. Brisbane, at Casey Fields
- Height: 184 cm (6 ft 0 in)
- Position: Forward

Playing career^{1}
Years	Club	Games (Goals)
2017–2018	Melbourne	9 (10)
- ^{1} Playing statistics correct to the end of the 2018 season.

Career highlights
- Melbourne Woman's leading goalkicker: 2017

Alyssa Mifsud (born 22 December 1994) is an Australian rules footballer who played for the Melbourne Football Club in the AFL Women's competition. She was drafted by Melbourne with their fifth selection and fortieth overall in the 2016 AFL Women's draft. She made her debut in the fifteen point loss to Brisbane at Casey Fields in the opening round of the 2017 season. She played every match in her debut season to finish with seven games, in addition to placing equal third in the league goalkicking with nine goals. Melbourne signed Mifsud for the 2018 season during the trade period in May 2017. She decided to step away from the club and pursue new ambitions by the end of 2018.

Mifsud now continues to play her footy in the Division 1 competition of the Northern Football Netball League with the VU Western Spurs where she began her career before playing in the AFLW competition. In 2019 she became a premiership player after a dominating performance against diamond creek. Mifsud has been selected as a Division 1 Allstar midfielder.
