= Jack Billings =

Australian rules footballer (born 1995)

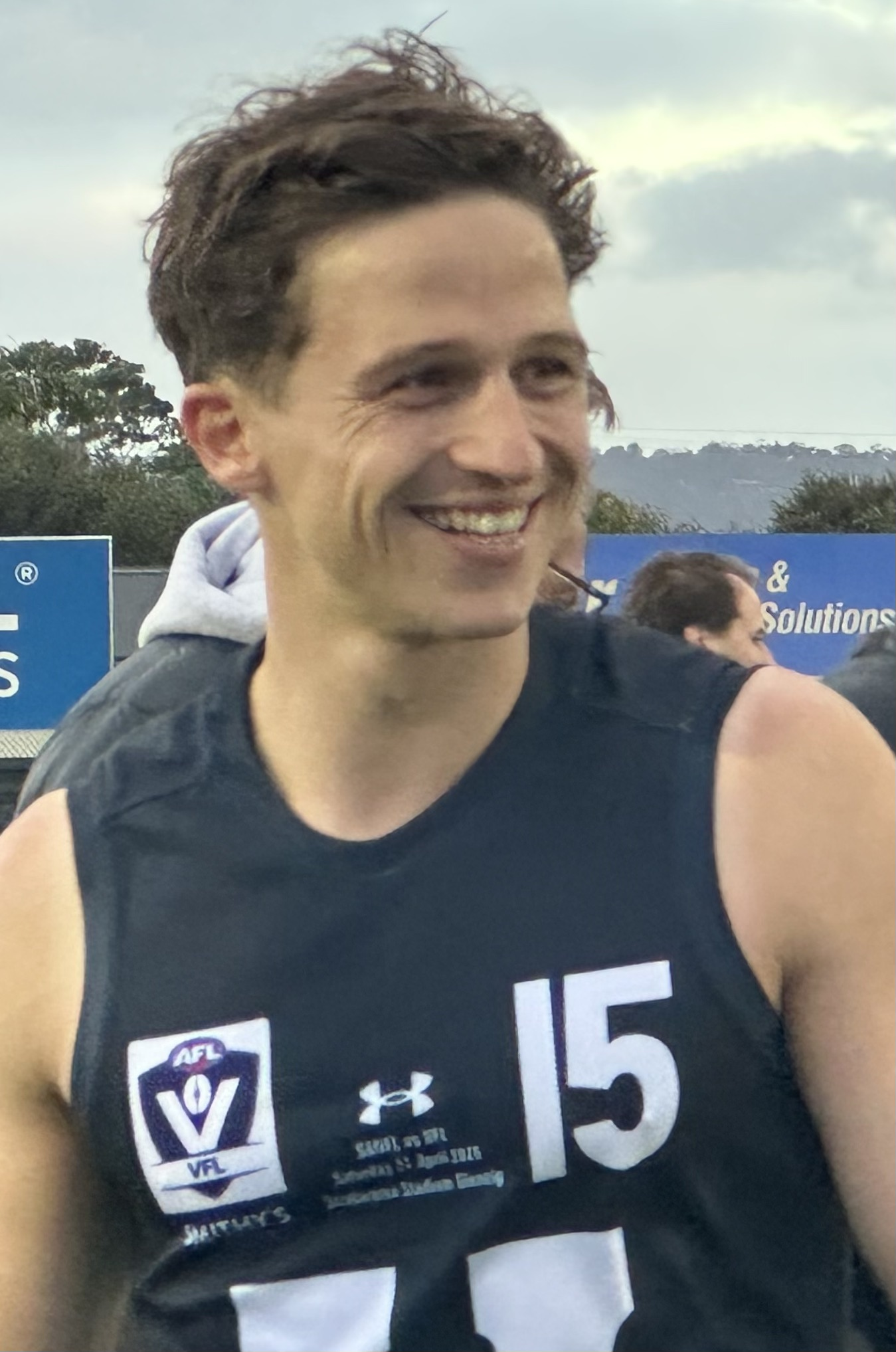
- Billings representing the VFL in 2026

Personal information
- Full name: Jack Billings
- Born: 18 August 1995 (age 31)
- Original team: Oakleigh Chargers (TAC Cup)/Scotch College (APS)/Kew Comets (YJFL)
- Draft: No. 3, 2013 national draft
- Height: 185 cm (6 ft 1 in)
- Weight: 82 kg (181 lb)
- Position: Midfielder / Forward

Playing career
Years	Club	Games (Goals)
2014–2023	St Kilda	155 (108)
2024–2025	Melbourne	17 (4)
Total		172 (112)

Career highlights
- 2014 AFL Rising Star nominee

Jack Billings (born 18 August 1995) is a former Australian rules footballer who played for St Kilda and Melbourne in the Australian Football League (AFL). Billings played TAC Cup with Oakleigh Chargers and played for Vic Metro in Under 18 Championships. Billings is a two-time Under 18 All-Australian after making the team as an underage player. He was taken by St Kilda with pick #3 in the 2013 National Draft.

== AFL career ==
=== St Kilda ===
Billings made his debut in Round 1 of the 2014 AFL season against Melbourne. He started as the substitute and had limited game time. After Round 1, Billings was dropped to the VFL for two weeks, kicking five goals for the Sandringham Zebras and was selected in the senior side the next week. In Round 14, 2014, against the West Coast Eagles, Billings kicked three goals and gathered 25 touches, earning that round's AFL Rising Star nomination.

Billings missed large parts of the 2015 and 2016 seasons with a shin injury and ankle injury respectively, but came back strong in the latter part of 2016 to poll votes in the club's best and fairest award in four of the last five games. Billings injured his hamstring in the 2022 pre season competition.

Billings played his 50th AFL game against Carlton in Round 8, 2017, managing 30 disposals, 12 marks and 5 goals. In August 2017, Billings signed a two-year contract extension, to remain at the club until the end of 2019.

After a slump in form in the first half of the 2018 season, Billings was dropped from St Kilda's senior team to their VFL affiliate Sandringham. In his first and only VFL game for 2018, Billings collected 53 disposals and was immediately recalled to the senior team.

Prior to the 2019 season, Billings was elevated to St Kilda's leadership group after teammate Dylan Roberton was sidelined with a heart condition. Billings played his 100th AFL game in Round 16, 2019 against North Melbourne and starred with 35 disposals. Billings finished 2019 in fourth place in St Kilda's best and fairest. Billings signed a contract extension with St Kilda in 2019, keeping him at the club until at least the end of 2021. He was a restricted free agent in 2021 but, despite speculation he would switch clubs, he signed a new deal.

Following a downturn in form and injury which led to him only playing 11 games in 2022 and 2023, he was traded to Melbourne after the 2023 AFL season.

=== Melbourne ===
Billings played 16 games in his first season at Melbourne, kicking 4 goals

Billings was delisted by Melbourne at the end of the 2025 AFL season, having played just 1 game for the year in round 3 against Gold Coast. Unusually, this was announced during the club's award ceremony, unlike the other delistings which were done prior.

== Personal life ==
Billings married Sarah Joyce on 22 December 2023.

Billings grew up in the Melbourne suburb of Kew and attended Scotch College. He played junior football for Kew Comets in the Yarra Junior Football League.

== Statistics ==
Legend
G	Goals	K	Kicks	D	Disposals	T	Tackles
B	Behinds	H	Handballs	M	Marks

Season	Team	No.	Games	Totals							Averages (per game)							Votes
Season	Team	No.	Games	G	B	K	H	D	M	T	G	B	K	H	D	M	T	Votes
2014	St Kilda	15	16	14	15	149	84	233	76	28	0.9	0.9	9.3	5.3	14.6	4.8	1.8	1
2015	St Kilda	15	9	7	6	100	83	183	40	28	0.8	0.7	11.1	9.2	20.3	4.4	3.1	2
2016	St Kilda	15	17	6	12	181	162	343	72	56	0.4	0.7	10.6	9.5	20.2	4.2	3.3	1
2017	St Kilda	15	22	23	36	254	254	508	122	69	1.0	1.6	11.5	11.5	23.1	5.5	3.1	11
2018	St Kilda	15	21	14	19	229	230	459	101	59	0.7	0.9	10.9	11.0	21.9	4.8	2.8	2
2019	St Kilda	15	22	13	10	316	250	566	132	65	0.6	0.5	14.4	11.4	25.7	6.0	3.0	11
2020 (Note: The 2020 season was played with 17 home-and-away matches per team (down from 22) and 16-minute quarters with time on (down from 20-minute quarters with time on) due to the impact of the COVID-19 pandemic.)	St Kilda	15	19	11	6	205	147	352	77	47	0.6	0.3	10.8	7.7	18.5	4.1	2.5	2
2021	St Kilda	15	18	14	14	218	143	361	113	35	0.8	0.8	12.1	7.9	20.1	6.3	1.9	2
2022	St Kilda	15	8	5	2	92	44	136	46	19	0.6	0.3	11.5	5.5	17.0	5.8	2.4	0
2023	St Kilda	15	3	1	3	22	23	45	13	6	0.3	1.0	7.3	7.7	15.0	4.3	2.0	0
2024	Melbourne	14	16	4	8	152	98	250	74	29	0.3	0.5	9.5	6.1	15.6	4.6	1.8	0
2025	Melbourne	14	1	0	0	5	9	14	2	2	0.0	0.0	5.0	9.0	14.0	2.0	2.0	0
Career			172	112	131	1923	1527	3450	868	443	0.7	0.8	11.2	8.9	20.1	5.0	2.6	32
