= Michael Hibberd =

Australian rules footballer (born 1990)

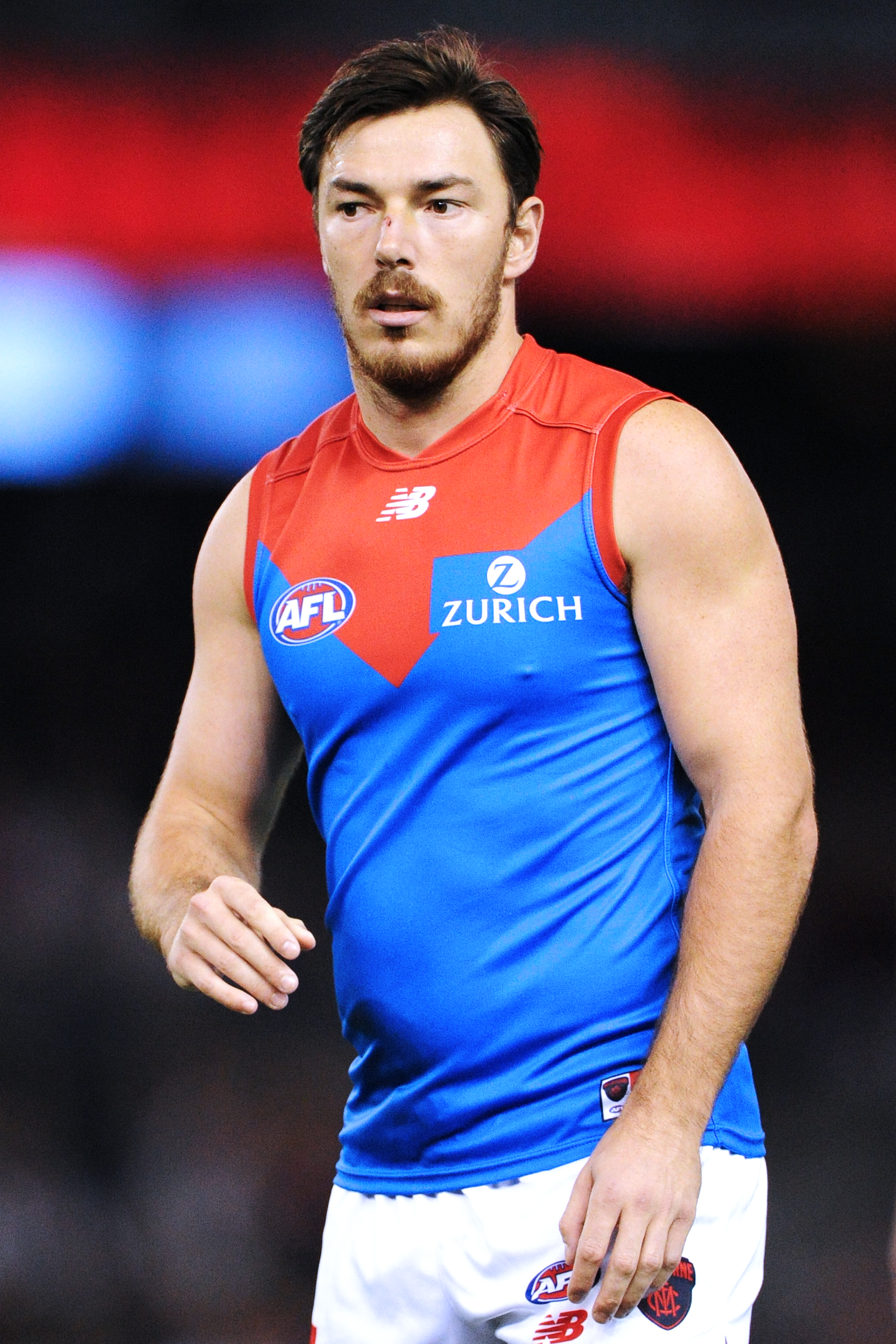
- Hibberd playing for Melbourne in April 2018

Personal information
- Full name: Michael George Hibberd
- Nickname: Pig
- Born: 3 January 1990 (age 36)
- Original team: Frankston (VFL)
- Draft: No. 4, 2011 pre-season draft
- Height: 187 cm (6 ft 2 in)
- Weight: 94 kg (207 lb)
- Position: Defender

Club information
- Current club: Melbourne
- Number: 14

Playing career^{1}
Years	Club	Games (Goals)
2011–2016	Essendon	84 (11)
2017–2023	Melbourne	113 (3)
Total		197 (14)

International team honours^{2}
Years	Team	Games (Goals)
2017	Australia	1 (0)
- ^{1} Playing statistics correct to the end of 2023.^{2} Representative statistics correct as of 2017.

Career highlights
- AFL premiership player: 2021; All-Australian team: 2017; Fothergill–Round–Mitchell Medal: 2010

Michael George Hibberd (born 3 January 1990) is a former professional Australian rules footballer who played for the Melbourne Football Club and Essendon Football Club in the Australian Football League (AFL). A defender, 1.87 metres (6 ft 2 in) tall and weighing 94 kilograms (207 lb), Hibberd plays primarily on the half-back flank. After spending the 2008 season with the Dandenong Stingrays in the TAC Cup, he missed out on selection in the 2008 AFL draft, which saw him spend two seasons in the Victorian Football League (VFL) with the Frankston Football Club. After winning Frankston's best and fairest and the Fothergill–Round Medal as the VFL's most promising young player in 2010, he was recruited by the Essendon Football Club with the fourth selection in the 2011 pre-season draft.

Hibberd made his AFL debut during the 2011 season and in the same year, he was forced to miss the second half of the year after a club-imposed suspension due to an assault charge. His next four years at the club saw him rewarded with the club rising star award and three top-ten finishes in the best and fairest count. After being suspended for the entire 2016 season due to his involvement in the Essendon supplements saga, he was traded to the Melbourne Football Club during the 2016 trade period. His first season with Melbourne saw him receive All-Australian honours and represent Australia in the International Rules Series.

== Early life ==
Originally from the small town of Somerville on the Mornington Peninsula, Hibberd played with the Dandenong Stingrays in the TAC Cup in 2008, where he managed to play only half the season due to a groin injury. He finished fifth in the best and fairest count and was awarded the Dandenong Stingrays coaches award. After being overlooked in the 2008 AFL draft, he joined the Frankston Football Club in the Victorian Football League (VFL). His first year at Frankston saw him finish fifth in the best and fairest and claim the best first year player award. In his second year at the club, his season was rewarded with the senior best and fairest award and the Fothergill–Round Medal as the VFL's most promising young player.

== AFL career ==
=== 2011–2012: Early career ===
Hibberd was drafted by the Essendon Football Club with their only selection and fourth overall in the 2011 pre-season draft. He made his AFL debut in the 139-point win against Gold Coast at Etihad Stadium in round six. He was omitted the next week for the match against West Coast, before returning in round eight in the thirty-six point win against Brisbane at the Gabba, where he recorded twenty-two disposals and was praised by then-Essendon coach, James Hird, in particular for his courage around the ball. Playing the next seven matches, he missed the round seventeen match against Adelaide at AAMI Stadium due to a hamstring injury.

After playing the first five matches for the 2012 season, he suffered a hamstring injury during the first quarter of the Anzac Day clash against Collingwood in round five, which forced him to miss six weeks of football. He made his return from injury through the Victorian Football League (VFL), playing for Essendon's affiliate team, Bendigo. After playing two matches in the VFL, he returned to the AFL side for the twenty-four point win against Fremantle at Patersons Stadium in round thirteen. He played the next three matches before injuring his quad in the fifty point win against Port Adelaide at AAMI Stadium in round sixteen. He missed three weeks due to the injury and returned to the side for the twenty-four point loss against North Melbourne at Etihad Stadium in round twenty. He played the remainder of the season, managing thirteen matches for the year and was rewarded with the club rising star award as the best young player. At the end of the year he changed guernsey numbers from 43 to 1.

=== 2013–2015: Emergence as a half-back flanker ===
The 2013 season saw Hibberd play every match of the year for the first time in his career. His performances during the season was described by The Age journalist, Rohan Connolly, as "the best football of his career" and he was named in Connolly's mid-season All-Australian team. His running off of half-back saw him compared to six time All-Australian, Corey Enright, by Rohan Connolly. After the announcement of the forty man squad for the 2013 All-Australian team, he was considered unlucky to miss out on selection by AFL Media journalist, Nick Bowen, and The Age journalist and former player, Matthew Lloyd. His improved season saw him finish fourth in the clubs best and fairest count.

Despite a hamstring injury during the 2014 NAB Challenge, Hibberd played the first fourteen matches of the year, before he was forced to miss the round sixteen match against Port Adelaide at the Adelaide Oval due to an ankle injury. He returned to the side two weeks later for the seven point win against the Western Bulldogs at Etihad Stadium in round eighteen, before succumbing to a hamstring injury the next week and missed two weeks. He returned from injury in the three point win against West Coast at Etihad Stadium in round twenty-one, where he was named the best player for Essendon by The Age and AFL Media. He played the remainder of the season, including his first final in the twelve point loss against North Melbourne at the Melbourne Cricket Ground in the second elimination final. His form in the first half of the year before his injuries was praised within the industry, with Herald Sun journalist, Sam Landsberger, claiming he was in All-Australian form and he signed a three-year contract with the club, tying him to the club until the end of the 2017 season. He played nineteen matches for the season and finished fourth in the best and fairest count for the second consecutive season.

Hibberd played every match for the 2015 season apart from the final round match against Collingwood due to a knee injury. After strong seasons in 2013 and 2014, he had a dip in form after spending more time in the midfield. Despite a drop in form, he managed a top-ten finish in the best and fairest, placing eighth and he was named in Essendon's best players six times during the season by AFL Media.

=== 2016–present: Suspension and move to Melbourne ===
Hibberd, along with 33 other Essendon players, was found guilty of using a banned performance-enhancing substance, thymosin beta-4, as part of Essendon's sports supplements program during the 2012 season. He and his teammates were initially found not guilty in March 2015 by the AFL Anti-Doping Tribunal, but a guilty verdict was returned in January 2016 after an appeal by the World Anti-Doping Agency. He was suspended for two years which, with backdating, ended in November 2016; as a result, he served approximately fourteen months of his suspension and missed the entire 2016 season. After speculation surrounding whether he would return to Essendon once his suspension was finished, he confirmed in August that he wanted to be traded to another club for a "fresh start" despite being contracted to Essendon until the end of 2017 and he nominated Melbourne as his preferred destination in September. He was officially traded to Melbourne in October.

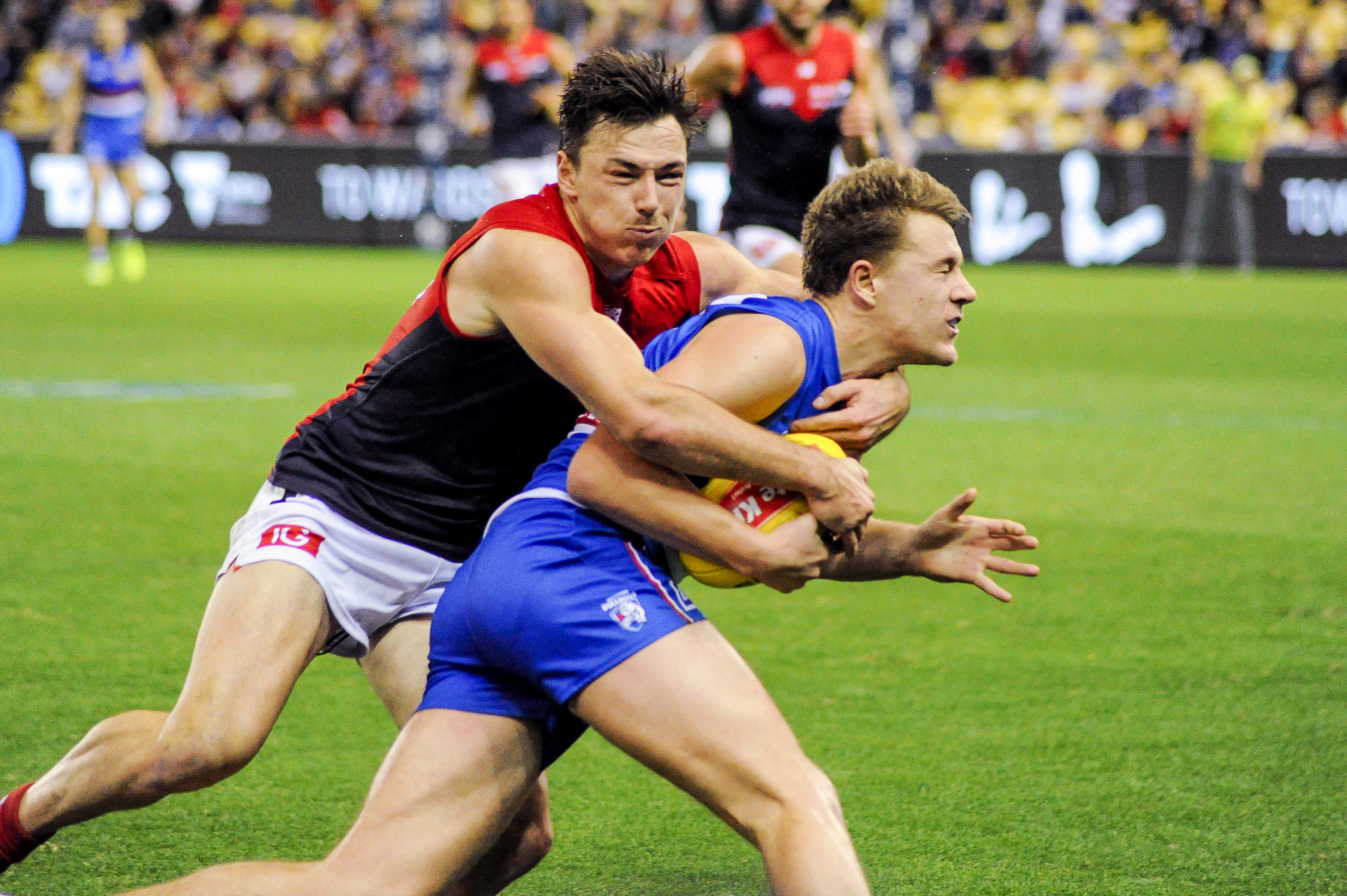
Hibberd tackling Jack Macrae in round 13, 2017.

After experiencing patella tendinitis in his knee during 2016, Hibberd was eased back into pre-season training. In addition to sustaining a hamstring injury which limited his training further and he was forced to miss the opening match of the 2017 JLT Community Series. He played his first match in Melbourne colours in Melbourne's second match of the JLT Community Series, which was a fifty-four point win against Carlton at Casey Fields. A few days later, he suffered an achilles injury at training, which forced him to miss five weeks of football. He returned to playing via the VFL with Melbourne's affiliate team, the Casey, in the round one clash against Williamstown at Burbank Oval, in which he recorded twenty-five disposals and was one of Casey's best players according to elite performance manager, Dave Misson. He spent just the one week in the VFL before making his debut for Melbourne in the Anzac Day eve match against Richmond at the Melbourne Cricket Ground in round five where he recorded twenty-seven disposals, eight rebound 50s, six marks and a goal. He was named Melbourne's best player by Herald Sun journalist, Sam Landsberger, and was named in AFL Media's team of the week.

He played every match for the remainder of the season to finish with eighteen games and averaged career-highs in disposals (27.4) and rebound 50s (6.8), the latter of which ranked second in the league; furthermore he averaged the highest metres gained per match (545.7) in the league. He was highly praised for his debut season with Melbourne with the Australian Associated Press' Michael Ramsey writing Hibberd was almost certainly Melbourne's most valuable addition. The Herald Sun's Rebecca Williams and AFL Media's Ben Guthrie furthered this notion by stating he had proven to be one of the top recruits in the league. In addition, The Age reporter, Anthony Colangelo, said Hibberd was one of "Melbourne's best and most important players in their charge up the ladder." His season was rewarded with his first All-Australian selection, where he was named in the back pocket, he was one of three Melbourne nominees for the Leigh Matthews Trophy, and was named in AFL Media's team of the week a further three times after his debut for Melbourne. Despite being one of the favourites to win the best and fairest at Melbourne, he ultimately finished sixth in the award. He received international honours at the end of the season when he represented Australia in the International Rules Series against Ireland in November.

== Assault charge ==
In August 2011, Hibbered was charged with assault after he punched and knocked a man out in Mornington on 31 July. He pleaded guilty to the charges in September and escaped conviction, but received a $2500 fine.

== Statistics ==
Updated to the end of the 2023 season.

Legend
G	Goals	K	Kicks	D	Disposals	T	Tackles
B	Behinds	H	Handballs	M	Marks

Season	Team	No.	Games	Totals							Averages (per game)							Votes
Season	Team	No.	Games	G	B	K	H	D	M	T	G	B	K	H	D	M	T	Votes
2011	Essendon	43	9	1	1	101	71	172	47	13	0.1	0.1	11.2	7.9	19.1	5.2	1.4	0
2012	Essendon	43	13	0	1	153	79	232	65	16	0.0	0.1	11.8	6.1	17.8	5.0	1.2	0
2013	Essendon	1	22	5	3	334	186	520	135	33	0.2	0.1	15.2	8.5	23.6	6.1	1.5	8
2014	Essendon	1	19	2	1	286	179	465	121	29	0.1	0.1	15.1	9.4	24.5	6.4	1.5	3
2015	Essendon	1	21	3	5	262	204	466	113	31	0.1	0.2	12.5	9.7	22.2	5.4	1.5	2
2016 (Note: Hibberd was unavailable to be selected for the entire 2016 season due to being one of the 34 players suspended as part of the Essendon Football Club supplements saga.)	Essendon	1	0	—	—	—	—	—	—	—	—	—	—	—	—	—	—	—
2017	Melbourne	14	18	1	1	305	188	493	97	23	0.1	0.1	17.0	10.4	27.4	5.4	1.3	7
2018	Melbourne	14	21	1	1	244	153	397	83	35	0.0	0.0	11.6	7.3	18.9	4.0	1.7	1
2019	Melbourne	14	19	0	2	197	127	324	75	29	0.0	0.1	10.4	6.7	17.1	4.0	1.5	0
2020 (Note: The 2020 season was played with 17 home-and-away matches per team (down from 22) and 16-minute quarters with time on (down from 20-minute quarters with time on) due to the impact of the COVID-19 pandemic.)	Melbourne	14	14	1	0	135	79	214	62	14	0.1	0.0	9.6	5.6	15.3	4.4	1.0	0
2021^{#}	Melbourne	14	17	0	0	127	100	227	58	35	0.0	0.0	7.5	5.9	13.4	3.4	2.1	0
2022	Melbourne	14	12	0	0	105	62	167	52	21	0.0	0.0	8.8	5.2	13.9	4.3	1.8	0
2023 (Note: 2023 statistics include two games in which Hibberd was substituted out of the game (round 4 & 7).)	Melbourne	14	12	0	0	83	50	133	36	11	0.0	0.0	6.9	4.2	11.1	3.0	0.9	0
Career			197	14	15	2332	1478	3810	944	290	0.1	0.1	11.8	7.5	19.3	4.8	1.5	21

== Honours and achievements ==
Team

- AFL premiership player (Melbourne): 2021
- McClelland Trophy (Melbourne): 2021

Individual

- All-Australian team: 2017
- Australia international rules football team: 2017
- Fothergill–Round–Mitchell Medal: 2010
