= Emma Humphries (Australian footballer) =

Australian rules footballer

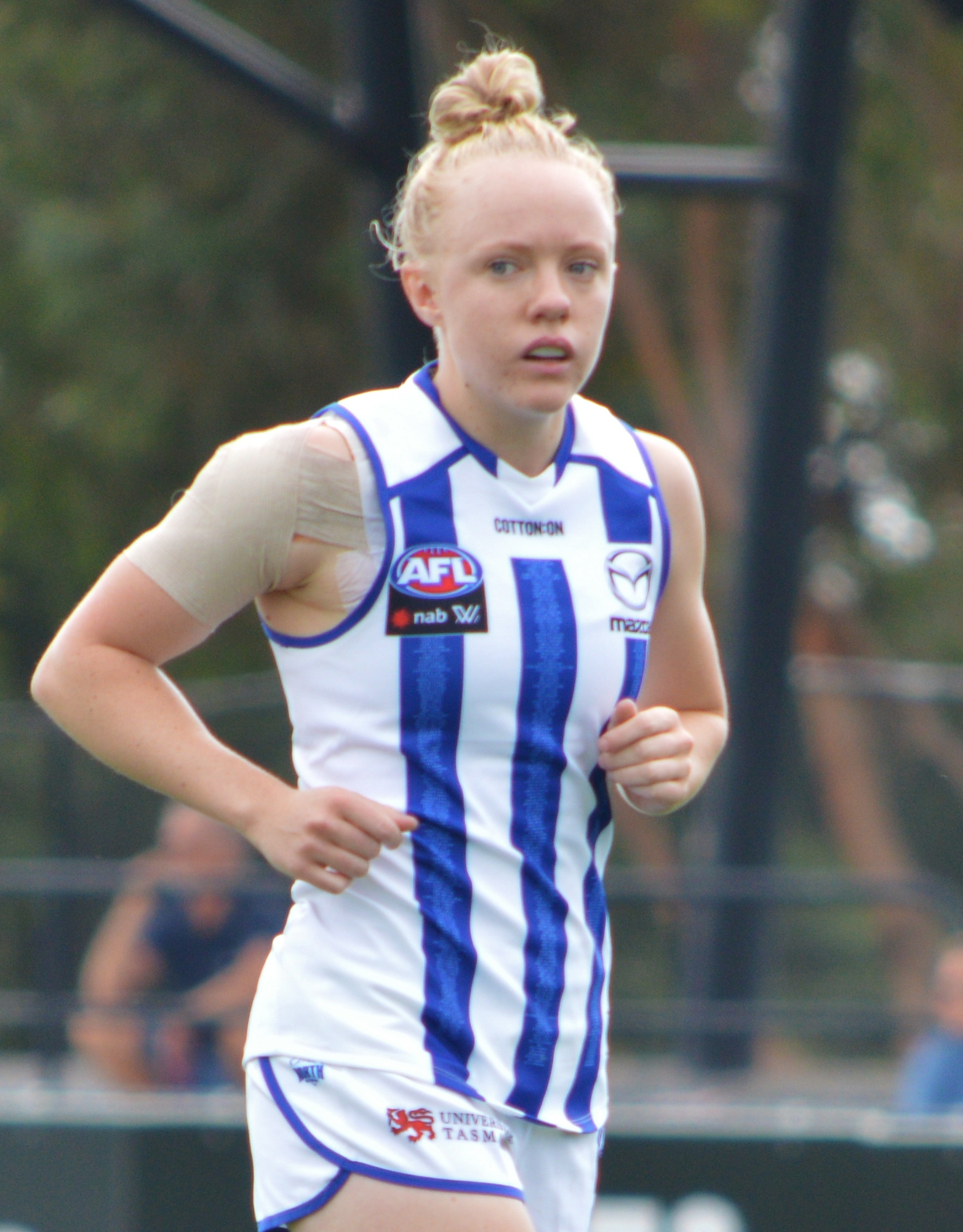
- Humphries with North Melbourne in January 2019

Personal information
- Born: 27 July 1995 (age 31)
- Original team: Burnie Dockers (TSL)
- Draft: No. 57, 2016 AFL Women's draft
- Debut: Round 1, 2017, Melbourne vs. Brisbane, at Casey Fields
- Height: 164 cm (5 ft 5 in)
- Position: Midfielder

Club information
- Current club: West Coast
- Number: 12

Playing career^{1}
Years	Club	Games (Goals)
2017–2018	Melbourne	10 (1)
2019–2020	North Melbourne	6 (0)
2022 (S7)–	West Coast	10 (2)
Total		26 (3)
- ^{1} Playing statistics correct to the end of 2022 season 7.

Emma Humphries (born 27 July 1995) is an Australian rules footballer who plays for West Coast in the AFL Women's (AFLW) competition. She has previously played for Melbourne and North Melbourne.

== AFLW career ==
=== Melbourne ===
Humphries was drafted by Melbourne with their eighth selection and fifty-seventh overall in the 2016 AFL Women's draft. She made her debut in the fifteen point loss to Brisbane at Casey Fields in the opening round of the 2017 season. She played every match in her debut season to finish with seven games. Melbourne signed Humphries for the 2018 season during the trade period in May 2017.

=== North Melbourne ===
In May 2018, Humphries was traded to North Melbourne.

At the end of the 2020 AFL women's season Humphries was delisted by North Melbourne.

=== West Coast ===
In June 2022, after a good season with Hawthorn in the VFL Women's league, Humphries was signed by West Coast as a priority player.
