= 2017 North Melbourne Football Club season =

Season summary

North Melbourne
2017 season
- President: Ben Buckley
- Coach: Brad Scott (8th season)
- Captains: Jack Ziebell (1st season)
- Home ground: Etihad Stadium (Capacity: 56,347); Blundstone Arena (Capacity: 19,500)
- Pre Season: 2 wins, 1 loss
- AFL season: 6-16 (15th)
- Best and Fairest: Shaun Higgins
- Leading goalkicker: Ben Brown (63)
- Highest home attendance: 42,814 vs. Western Bulldogs (Round 4)
- Lowest home attendance: 8,758 vs. Greater Western Sydney (Round 3)
- Average home attendance: 22,678 (▼5,493)
- Club membership: 40,343 (▼4,671)

The 2017 AFL season was the 92nd season in the Australian Football League (AFL) contested by the North Melbourne Football Club. The club finished in 15th place on the ladder after winning only six games.

== List changes ==
=== Retirements and delistings ===
Player	Date	Reason	Career games	Career goals	Ref.
Nick Dal Santo	24 August 2016	Retired	322	156	
Michael Firrito	24 August 2016	Retired	275	29	
Brent Harvey	24 August 2016	Retired	432	518	
Drew Petrie	24 August 2016	Delisted	316	428	
Farren Ray	14 September 2016	Retired	209	59	
Robin Nahas	14 September 2016	Delisted	117	135	
Brad McKenzie	26 October 2016	Delisted	37	6	
Joel Tippett	26 October 2016	Delisted	9	0	

=== Trades ===
Date	Gained	From	Lost	Ref.
17 October 2016	Paul Ahern	Greater Western Sydney	Pick 69	
20 October 2016	Nathan Hrovat	Western Bulldogs	2017 third-round pick	
20 October 2016	2017 third-round pick	Western Bulldogs	2017 third-round pick	
20 October 2016	2017 fourth-round pick	Western Bulldogs	2017 fourth-round pick	
20 October 2016	Pick 92	Geelong	Aaron Black	
20 October 2016	Marley Williams	Collingwood	Pick 105	

=== Free agency ===
==== Out ====
Player	Date	Free agent type	New club	Compensation	Ref.
Daniel Wells	11 November 2016	Unrestricted	Collingwood	2nd round	

=== National draft ===
Round	Pick	Player	Recruited from	League
1	12	Jy Simpkin	Murray Bushrangers	TAC Cup
2	34	Declan Watson	Aspley Football Club	NEAFL
2	36	Josh Williams	Surfers Paradise Australian Football Club	QAFL
5	75	Nick Larkey	Oakleigh Chargers	TAC Cup
Rookie elevation		Majak Daw	North Melbourne	AFL
Rookie elevation		Braydon Preuss	North Melbourne	AFL

=== Rookie draft ===
Round	Pick	Player	Recruited from	League
1	11	Cameron Zurhaar	East Fremantle Football Club	WAFL
2	28	Oscar Junker	Western Jets	TAC Cup
3	43	Matthew Taylor	Perth Football Club	WAFL

== Season summary ==
=== Pre-season ===
**Rd**	**Date and local time**	**Opponent**	**Scores** (North's scores indicated in **bold**)			**Venue**	**Attendance**	**Ref**
**Rd**	**Date and local time**	**Opponent**	**Home**	**Away**	**Result**	**Venue**	**Attendance**	**Ref**
1	Sunday, 19 February (2:05 pm)	Sydney	0.8.15 (63)	**0.9.11 (65)**	Won by 2 points	Coffs Harbour International Stadium (A)	3,040	
2	Sunday, 26 February (2:05 pm)	Hawthorn	**0.13.17 (95)**	0.11.8 (74)	Won by 21 points	Arden Street Oval (H)	3,981	
3	Friday, 10 March (5:50 pm)	Greater Western Sydney	2.15.17 (125)	**0.12.15 (87)**	Lost by 38 points	Manuka Oval (A)	3,997	

=== Home and away season ===
**Rd**	**Date and local time**	**Opponent**	**Scores** (North's scores indicated in **bold**)			**Venue**	**Attendance**	**Ladder** **position**	**Record**	**Ref.**
**Rd**	**Date and local time**	**Opponent**	Home	Away	Result	**Venue**	**Attendance**	**Ladder** **position**	**Record**	**Ref.**
1	Sunday, 26 March (1:10 pm)	West Coast	**13.15 (93)**	21.10 (136)	Lost by 43 points	Etihad Stadium (H)	21,997	15th	0–1	
2	Sunday, 2 April (1:10 pm)	Geelong	17.10 (112)	**17.9 (111)**	Lost by 1 point	Etihad Stadium (A)	30,917	12th	0–2	
3	Saturday, 8 April (1:45 pm)	Greater Western Sydney	**10.7 (67)**	15.19 (109)	Lost by 42 points	Blundstone Arena (H)	8,758	17th	0–3	
4	Friday, 14 April (4:20 pm)	Western Bulldogs	**12.14 (86)**	12.17 (89)	Lost by 3 points	Etihad Stadium (H)	42,814	17th	0–4	
5	Sunday, 22 April (1:10 pm)	Fremantle	9.13 (67)	**9.8 (62)**	Lost by 5 points	Domain Stadium (A)	33,319	17th	0–5	
6	Saturday, 29 April (7:25 pm)	Gold Coast	**16.11 (107)**	14.10 (94)	Won by 13 points	Etihad Stadium (H)	15,431	15th	1–5	
7	Sunday, 26 March (1:10 pm)	Adelaide	**22.13 (145)**	13.8 (86)	Won by 59 points	Blundstone Arena (H)	10,064	14th	2–5	
8	Sunday, 14 May (4:40 pm)	Sydney	**11.12 (78)**	18.12 (120)	Lost by 42 points	Etihad Stadium (H)	21,589	15th	2–6	
9	Sunday, 21 May (3:20 pm)	Melbourne	13.12 (90)	**15.14 (104)**	Won by 14 points	MCG (A)	33,218	14th	3–6	
10	Sunday, 28 May (3:20 pm)	Carlton	15.6 (96)	**17.11 (113)**	Won by 17 points	Etihad Stadium (A)	32,802	13th	4–6	
11	Saturday, 3 June (7:25 pm)	Richmond	**9.12 (66)**	14.17 (101)	Lost by 35 points	Etihad Stadium (H)	36,100	13th	4–7	
12	Bye							15th	4–7	
13	Friday, 16 June (6:10 pm)	St Kilda	**10.12 (72)**	12.17 (89)	Lost by 17 points	Etihad Stadium (H)	26,107	16th	4–8	
14	Saturday, 24 June (7:25 pm)	Western Bulldogs	15.17 (107)	**16.10 (106)**	Lost by 1 point	Etihad Stadium (A)	28,263	17th	4–9	
15	Saturday, 1 July (4:35 pm)	Gold Coast	18.10 (118)	**14.15 (99)**	Lost by 19 points	Metricon Stadium (A)	12,779	17th	4–10	
16	Sunday, 9 July (1:10 pm)	Fremantle	**12.10 (82)**	13.8 (86)	Lost by 4 points	Etihad Stadium (H)	19,267	17th	4–11	
17	Saturday, 15 July (1:40 pm)	Port Adelaide	19.13 (127)	**8.9 (57)**	Lost by 70 points	Adelaide Oval (A)	34,138	17th	4–12	
18	Saturday, 22 July (1:45 pm)	Essendon	20.12 (132)	**16.9 (105)**	Lost by 27 points	Etihad Stadium (A)	40,359	17th	4–13	
19	Saturday, 29 July (2:10 pm)	Melbourne	**11.10 (76)**	10.12 (72)	Won by 4 points	Blundstone Arena (H)	13,939	16th	5–13	
20	Saturday, 5 August (3:20 pm)	Collingwood	**7.15 (57)**	16.15 (111)	Lost by 54 points	Etihad Stadium (H)	33,394	16th	5–14	
21	Sunday, 13 August (7:25 pm)	Hawthorn	18.8 (116)	**14.5 (89)**	Lost by 27 points	University of Tasmania Stadium (A)	14,509	16th	5–15	
22	Sunday, 20 August (3:20 pm)	St Kilda	18.19 (127)	**12.6 (78)**	Lost by 49 points	Etihad Stadium (A)	29,162	17th	5–16	
23	Sunday, 27 August (2:10 pm)	Brisbane Lions	11.13 (79)	**19.16 (130)**	Won by 51 points	The Gabba (A)	15,416	15th	6–16	

==== Statistics ====
#	Player name	Games	G	B	K	H	D	M	T	H/O	G	B	K	H	D	M	T	H/O	Br
#	Player name	Totals									Averages (per game)								Br
3	Jed Anderson	5	3	2	28	28	56	8	24	0	0.6	0.4	5.6	5.6	11.2	1.6	4.8	0	0
18	Shaun Atley	22	11	11	185	200	385	76	57	0	0.5	0.5	8.4	9.1	17.5	3.5	2.6	0	0
50	Ben Brown	22	63	30	180	76	256	120	27	35	2.9	1.4	8.2	3.5	11.6	5.5	1.2	1.6	14
13	Ryan Clarke	15	6	4	127	170	297	56	31	0	0.4	0.3	8.5	11.3	19.8	3.7	2.1	0	0
10	Ben Cunnington	20	10	5	184	327	511	58	97	0	0.5	0.3	9.2	16.4	25.6	2.9	4.9	0	11
38	Majak Daw	7	4	3	28	20	48	17	23	112	0.6	0.4	4.0	2.9	6.9	2.4	3.3	16.0	0
14	Trent Dumont	19	7	3	191	200	391	46	83	0	0.4	0.2	10.1	10.5	20.6	2.4	4.4	0	0
24	Sam Durdin	8	1	4	58	32	90	32	14	0	0.1	0.5	7.3	4.0	11.3	4.0	1.8	0	0
27	Taylor Garner	18	16	8	153	133	286	80	61	0	0.9	0.4	8.5	7.4	15.9	4.4	3.4	0	0
43	Sam Gibson	22	5	9	245	241	486	100	71	0	0.2	0.4	11.1	11.0	22.1	4.5	3.2	0	1
22	Todd Goldstein	19	12	6	94	161	255	54	55	576	0.6	0.3	4.9	8.5	13.4	2.8	2.9	30.3	0
6	Lachlan Hansen	13	5	2	101	85	176	87	22	0	0.4	0.2	7.8	5.8	13.5	6.7	1.7	0	0
39	Mitchell Hibberd	4	0	0	18	29	47	10	8	0	0	0	4.5	7.3	11.8	2.5	2.0	0	0
4	Shaun Higgins	21	18	25	269	224	493	77	106	0	0.9	1.2	12.8	10.7	23.5	3.7	5.0	0	9
8	Nathan Hrovat	22	14	8	193	191	384	86	58	0	0.6	0.4	8.8	8.7	17.5	3.9	2.6	0	0
40	Nick Larkey	2	0	0	2	4	6	1	1	2	0	0	1.0	2.0	3.0	0.5	0.5	1.0	0
34	Jamie MacMillan	13	2	3	137	107	244	47	26	0	0.2	0.2	10.5	8.2	18.8	3.6	2.0	0	0
11	Luke McDonald	22	8	8	276	187	463	92	94	0	0.4	0.4	12.5	8.5	21.0	4.2	4.3	0	0
23	Ben McKay	1	0	0	2	7	9	1	3	3	0	0	2.0	7.0	9.0	1.0	3.0	3.0	0
42	Declan Mountford	12	3	2	78	99	177	38	46	0	0.3	0.2	6.5	8.3	14.8	3.2	3.8	0	0
17	Aaron Mullett	18	5	2	225	135	360	74	30	0	0.3	0.1	12.5	7.5	20	4.1	1.7	0	0
26	Daniel Nielson	7	0	0	33	28	61	24	8	0	0	0	4.7	4.0	8.7	3.4	1.1	0	0
31	Braydon Preuss	8	5	6	42	29	71	29	23	180	0.6	0.8	5.3	3.6	8.9	3.6	2.9	22.5	0
21	Jy Simpkin	13	9	5	72	69	141	35	31	0	0.7	0.4	5.5	5.3	10.8	2.7	2.4	0	0
9	Andrew Swallow	16	4	3	134	179	313	33	106	0	0.3	0.2	8.4	11.2	19.6	2.1	6.6	0	0
25	Robbie Tarrant	21	1	1	229	144	373	131	55	0	0	0	10.9	6.9	17.8	6.2	2.6	0	0
12	Lindsay Thomas	9	5	7	68	42	110	25	32	0	0.6	0.8	7.6	4.7	12.2	2.8	3.6	0	0
16	Scott Thompson	21	1	1	168	154	322	108	52	0	0	0	8.0	7.3	15.3	5.1	2.5	0	0
28	Kayne Turner	15	17	8	94	89	183	54	61	0	1.1	0.5	6.3	5.9	12.2	3.6	4.1	0	0
33	Ed Vickers-Willis	7	0	1	34	62	96	16	22	0	0	0.1	4.9	8.9	13.7	2.3	3.1	0	0
41	Corey Wagner	4	0	2	18	13	31	6	6	0	0	0.5	4.5	3.3	7.8	1.5	1.5	0	0
30	Jarrad Waite	10	22	18	96	45	141	49	25	5	2.2	1.8	9.6	4.5	14.1	4.9	2.5	0.5	3
36	Josh Williams	2	1	2	13	13	26	10	4	0	0.5	1.0	6.5	6.5	13.0	5.0	2.0	0	0
2	Marley Williams	13	3	0	94	133	227	31	27	0	0.2	0	7.2	10.2	17.5	2.4	2.1	0	0
32	Mason Wood	10	14	11	79	58	137	42	25	0	1.4	1.1	7.9	5.8	13.7	4.2	2.5	0	1
7	Jack Ziebell	19	13	6	262	160	422	66	110	0	0.7	0.3	13.8	8.4	22.2	3.5	5.8	0	1
44	Cameron Zurhaar	4	2	3	22	14	36	9	7	0	0.5	0.8	5.5	3.5	9.0	2.5	1.8	0	0

=== Ladder ===
Pos	Team	Pld	W	L	D	PF	PA	PP	Pts	Qualification
1	Adelaide	22	15	6	1	2415	1776	136.0	62	2017 finals
2	Geelong	22	15	6	1	2134	1818	117.4	62	2017 finals
3	Richmond (P)	22	15	7	0	1992	1684	118.3	60	2017 finals
4	Greater Western Sydney	22	14	6	2	2081	1812	114.8	60	2017 finals
5	Port Adelaide	22	14	8	0	2168	1671	129.7	56	2017 finals
6	Sydney	22	14	8	0	2093	1651	126.8	56	2017 finals
7	Essendon	22	12	10	0	2135	2004	106.5	48	2017 finals
8	West Coast	22	12	10	0	1964	1858	105.7	48	2017 finals
9	Melbourne	22	12	10	0	2035	1934	105.2	48	
10	Western Bulldogs	22	11	11	0	1857	1913	97.1	44	
11	St Kilda	22	11	11	0	1925	1986	96.9	44	
12	Hawthorn	22	10	11	1	1864	2055	90.7	42	
13	Collingwood	22	9	12	1	1944	1963	99.0	38	
14	Fremantle	22	8	14	0	1607	2160	74.4	32	
**15**	North Melbourne	**22**	**6**	**16**	**0**	**1983**	**2264**	**87.6**	24	
16	Carlton	22	6	16	0	1594	2038	78.2	24	
17	Gold Coast	22	6	16	0	1756	2311	76.0	24	
18	Brisbane Lions	22	5	17	0	1877	2526	74.3	20	

Source: AFL
Rules for classification: 1) points; 2) percentage; 3) number of points for.
(P) Premiers

== Honours ==
=== Syd Barker Medal ===
1. Shaun Higgins (217 votes)

2. Ben Cunnington (211 votes)

3. Ben Brown (209 votes)

4. Robbie Tarrant (204 votes)

5. Luke McDonald (192 votes)

6. Jack Ziebell (161 votes)

6. Sam Gibson (161 votes)

8. Taylor Garner (134 votes)

9. Scott Thompson (126 votes)

10. Shaun Atley (125 votes)

=== AFL Award Nominations ===
- Round 5 – 2017 AFL Mark of the Year nomination – Taylor Garner
- Round 7 – 2017 AFL Mark of the Year nomination – Kayne Turner
- Round 13 – 2017 AFL Mark of the Year nomination – Jack Ziebell
- Round 16 – 2017 AFL Mark of the Year nomination – Luke McDonald
- Round 16 – 2017 AFL Goal of the Year nomination – Shaun Higgins
- Round 18 – 2017 AFL Goal of the Year nomination – Jarrad Waite
- Round 19 – 2017 AFL Mark of the Year nomination – Ben Brown

=== Debuts ===
- Round 1 – Braydon Preuss – AFL Debut
- Round 1 – Declan Mountford – AFL Debut
- Round 1 – Jy Simpkin – AFL Debut
- Round 1 – Mitchell Hibberd – AFL Debut
- Round 1 – Marley Williams – North Melbourne Debut
- Round 1 – Nathan Hrovat – North Melbourne Debut
- Round 3 – Sam Durdin – AFL Debut
- Round 5 – Ed Vickers-Willis – AFL Debut
- Round 16 – Daniel Nielson – AFL Debut
- Round 17 – Cameron Zurhaar – AFL Debut
- Round 18 – Nick Larkey – AFL Debut
- Round 18 – Josh Williams – AFL Debut
- Round 23 – Ben McKay – AFL Debut

=== Milestones ===
- Round 3 – Jack Ziebell – 150 Games
- Round 4 – Lindsay Thomas – 200 Games
- Round 4 – Ben Brown – 100th Goal
- Round 6 – Ben Cunnington – 150 Games
- Round 17 – Robbie Tarrant – 100 Games
- Round 18 – Sam Gibson – 50th Goal
- Round 19 – Shaun Atley – 150 Games
- Round 19 – Shaun Higgins – 50 North Melbourne Games
- Round 19 – Ben Brown – 50th Goal in Season
- Round 20 – Jack Ziebell – 100th Goal
- Round 21 – Nathan Hrovat – 50 AFL Games
- Round 23 – Scott Thompson – 200 Games
- Round 23 – Ben Brown – 150th Goal
