= List of AFL debuts in 2017 =

The following is the list of players in the Australian Football League (AFL) who have either made their AFL debut or played for a new club during the 2017 AFL season.

== Summary ==
Summary of debuts in 2017
Club	AFL debuts	Change of club
Adelaide	4	2
Brisbane Lions	6	2
Carlton	7	4
Collingwood	3	5
Essendon	3	2
Fremantle	7	5
Geelong	8	2
Gold Coast	6	4
Greater Western Sydney	5	4
Hawthorn	5	4
Melbourne	4	3
North Melbourne	11	2
Port Adelaide	6	0
Richmond	5	3
St Kilda	3	4
Sydney	6	0
West Coast	2	3
Western Bulldogs	3	1
Total	94	50

== AFL debuts ==
Name	Club	Age at debut	Debut round	Notes
Sam Petrevski-Seton	Carlton	19 years, 33 days	1	Pick 6, 2016 national draft
Harrison Macreadie	Carlton	18 years, 346 days	1	Pick 47, 2016 national draft
Jarrod Pickett	Carlton	20 years, 217 days	1	Traded in 2016
Dan Butler	Richmond	20 years, 293 days	1	Pick 67, 2014 national draft
Mitch Hannan	Melbourne	23 years, 16 days	1	Pick 46, 2016 national draft
Joel Smith	Melbourne	21 years, 29 days	1	Pick 41, 2016 rookie draft, son of Shaun Smith
Sam Powell-Pepper	Port Adelaide	19 years, 77 days	1	Pick 18, 2016 national draft, round 1 2017 Rising Star nomination
Dan Houston	Port Adelaide	19 years, 317 days	1	Pick 45, 2016 rookie draft
Brett Eddy	Port Adelaide	27 years, 211 days	1	Pick 26, 2017 rookie draft
Oliver Florent	Sydney	18 years, 246 days	1	Pick 11, 2016 national draft
Ben Ainsworth	Gold Coast	19 years, 44 days	1	Pick 4, 2016 national draft
Jack Bowes	Gold Coast	19 years, 59 days	1	Pick 10, 2016 national draft (Academy player)
Andrew McGrath	Essendon	18 years, 296 days	1	Pick 1, 2016 national draft, round 4 2017 Rising Star nomination
Braydon Preuss	North Melbourne	21 years, 283 days	1	Pick 15, 2015 rookie draft
Declan Mountford	North Melbourne	20 years, 42 days	1	Pick 60, 2015 national draft
Jy Simpkin	North Melbourne	19 years, 21 days	1	Pick 12, 2016 national draft
Mitchell Hibberd	North Melbourne	20 years, 184 days	1	Pick 33, 2015 national draft
Tim Taranto	Greater Western Sydney	19 years, 58 days	1	Pick 2, 2016 national draft, round 8 2017 Rising Star nomination
Tom Stewart	Geelong	24 years, 11 days	1	Pick 40, 2016 national draft
Brandan Parfitt	Geelong	18 years, 333 days	1	Pick 26, 2016 national draft, round 3 2017 Rising Star nomination
Nic Newman	Sydney	24 years, 76 days	2	Pick 35, 2015 rookie draft
Will Hayward	Sydney	18 years, 156 days	2	Pick 21, 2016 national draft
Robbie Fox	Sydney	23 years, 349 days	2	Pick 34, 2017 rookie draft
Teia Miles	Hawthorn	20 years, 150 days	2	Pick 49, 2014 national draft, son of Geoff Miles
Jordan Dawson	Sydney	19 years, 363 days	3	Pick 56, 2016 national draft
Sam Durdin	North Melbourne	20 years, 306 days	3	Pick 16, 2014 national draft
James Parsons	Geelong	19 years, 361 days	3	Pick 27, 2016 rookie draft
Tim Smith	Melbourne	26 years, 48 days	3	Pick 25, 2017 rookie draft
Griffin Logue	Fremantle	18 years, 360 days	3	Pick 8, 2016 national draft
Harley Balic	Fremantle	20 years, 94 days	3	Pick 38, 2015 national draft
Hugh McCluggage	Brisbane Lions	19 years, 38 days	3	Pick 3, 2016 national draft
Jarrod Berry	Brisbane Lions	19 years, 64 days	3	Pick 17, 2016 national draft
Tom Williamson	Carlton	18 years, 118 days	3	Pick 61, 2016 national draft
Zac Fisher	Carlton	18 years, 304 days	4	Pick 27, 2016 national draft
Ben Long	St Kilda	19 years, 238 days	4	Pick 25, 2016 national draft
Cedric Cox	Brisbane Lions	19 years, 240 days	4	Pick 24, 2016 national draft
Aidyn Johnson	Port Adelaide	19 years, 172 days	5	Pick 45, 2015 national draft
Cameron Polson	Carlton	19 years, 42 days	5	Pick 59, 2016 national draft
Ed Vickers-Willis	North Melbourne	21 years, 25 days	5	Pick 36, 2014 national draft
Lewis Melican	Sydney	20 years, 169 days	5	Pick 52, 2015 rookie draft
Ben McNiece	Essendon	25 years, 34 days	5	2017 category B pre-rookie draft selection
Kurt Mutimer	West Coast	20 years, 50 days	6	Pick 57, 2015 national draft
Ivan Soldo	Richmond	21 years, 22 days	7	Pick 68, 2015 rookie draft
Brad Scheer	Gold Coast	18 years, 248 days	7	Pick 67, 2016 national draft (Academy player)
Daniel Lloyd	Greater Western Sydney	25 years, 85 days	8	Pick 26, 2016 rookie draft
Mark O'Connor	Geelong	20 years, 117 days	8	2017 category B (international) rookie draft selection
Shai Bolton	Richmond	18 years, 163 days	9	Pick 29, 2016 national draft, son of Darren Bolton
Harry Perryman	Greater Western Sydney	18 years, 152 days	9	Pick 14, 2016 national draft (Academy player)
Hugh Greenwood	Adelaide	25 years, 75 days	9	Pick 48, 2016 rookie draft (3-year non-registered player, via basketball)
Jordan Gallucci	Adelaide	19 years, 16 days	9	Pick 15, 2016 national draft
Jordan Cunico	Geelong	21 years, 18 days	10	Pick 59, 2014 national draft
James Cousins	Hawthorn	19 years, 69 days	10	Pick 46, 2017 rookie draft
Dallas Willsmore	Hawthorn	21 years, 362 days	10	Pick 17, 2014 rookie draft
Tim English	Western Bulldogs	19 years, 290 days	10	Pick 19, 2016 national draft
Will Brodie	Gold Coast	18 years, 277 days	10	Pick 9, 2016 national draft
Luke Ryan	Fremantle	21 years, 119 days	11	Pick 66, 2016 national draft
Jono Beech	Adelaide	26 years, 212 days	12	Pick 31, 2016 rookie draft
Brennan Cox	Fremantle	18 years, 301 days	12	Pick 41, 2016 national draft
Callum Brown	Collingwood	19 years, 47 days	12	Pick 35, 2016 national draft, son of Gavin Brown
Alex Witherden	Brisbane Lions	18 years, 287 days	14	Pick 23, 2016 national draft
Sean Darcy	Fremantle	19 years, 13 days	14	Pick 38, 2016 national draft
Josh Deluca	Fremantle	21 years, 45 days	14	Pick 68, 2014 national draft
Tyson Stengle	Richmond	18 years, 255 days	15	Pick 6, 2017 rookie draft
Wylie Buzza	Geelong	21 years, 121 days	15	Pick 69, 2015 national draft
Sam Simpson	Geelong	19 years, 18 days	15	Pick 53, 2017 rookie draft
Zach Guthrie	Geelong	19 years, 2 days	15	Pick 33, 2017 rookie draft
Jeremy Finlayson	Greater Western Sydney	21 years, 143 days	15	Pick 85, 2014 national draft, Academy player
Daniel Nielson	North Melbourne	21 years, 61 days	16	Pick 25, 2014 national draft
Ryan Nyhuis	Fremantle	20 years, 306 days	16	Pick 34, 2016 rookie draft
Joe Atley	Port Adelaide	18 years, 339 days	16	Pick 32, 2016 national draft
Josh Battle	St Kilda	18 years, 316 days	17	Pick 39, 2016 national draft
Cameron Zurhaar	North Melbourne	19 years, 55 days	17	Pick 11, 2017 rookie draft
Lewis Young	Western Bulldogs	18 years, 208 days	17	Pick 49, 2016 national draft
Alex Keath	Adelaide	25 years, 183 days	18	Pick 58, 2016 rookie draft
Josh Williams	North Melbourne	19 years, 41 days	18	Pick 36, 2016 national draft
Nick Larkey	North Melbourne	19 years, 47 days	18	Pick 73, 2016 national draft
Jack Scrimshaw	Gold Coast	18 years, 321 days	18	Pick 7, 2016 national draft
Conor Glass	Hawthorn	19 years, 297 days	18	Pick 62, 2016 rookie draft
Rowan Marshall	St Kilda	21 years, 240 days	18	Pick 10, 2017 rookie draft
Will Setterfield	Greater Western Sydney	19 years, 169 days	18	Pick 5, 2016 national draft, Academy player
Harry McKay	Carlton	19 years, 211 days	18	Pick 10, 2015 national draft
Max Spencer	Gold Coast	19 years, 298 days	19	2017 Queensland zone pre-rookie draft selection
Luke Partington	West Coast	20 years, 148 days	19	Pick 28, 2015 national draft
Jacob Allison	Brisbane Lions	19 years, 106 days	19	Pick 55, 2016 national draft
Sam Skinner	Brisbane Lions	20 years, 32 days	19	Pick 47, 2015 national draft
Corey Maynard	Melbourne	25 years, 302 days	20	2017 category B pre-rookie draft selection
Todd Marshall	Port Adelaide	18 years, 315 days	22	Pick 16, 2016 national draft
Josh Daicos	Collingwood	19 years, 266 days	22	Pick 57, 2016 national draft, son of Peter Daicos
Josh Begley	Essendon	19 years, 48 days	22	Pick 31, 2016 national draft
Jack Graham	Richmond	19 years, 177 days	22	Pick 53, 2016 national draft
Patrick Lipinski	Western Bulldogs	19 years, 40 days	23	Pick 28, 2016 national draft
Harry Morrison	Hawthorn	18 years, 286 days	23	Pick 74, 2016 national draft
Kayle Kirby	Collingwood	18 years, 304 days	23	Pick 50, 2016 national draft
Ben McKay	North Melbourne	19 years, 245 days	23	Pick 21, 2015 national draft

== Change of AFL club ==
Name	Club	Age at debut	Debut round	Former clubs	Recruiting method
Dion Prestia	Richmond	24 years, 162 days	1	Gold Coast	Traded in 2016
Josh Caddy	Richmond	24 years, 176 days	1	Gold Coast, Geelong	Traded in 2016
Billie Smedts	Carlton	24 years, 288 days	1	Geelong	Traded in 2016
Caleb Marchbank	Carlton	20 years, 106 days	1	Greater Western Sydney	Traded in 2016
Toby Nankervis	Richmond	22 years, 223 days	1	Sydney	Traded in 2016
Chris Mayne	Collingwood	28 years, 142 days	1	Fremantle	Free agent in 2016
Will Hoskin-Elliott	Collingwood	23 years, 203 days	1	Greater Western Sydney	Traded in 2016
Henry Schade	Collingwood	23 years, 167 days	1	Gold Coast	Pick 24, 2017 rookie draft
Travis Cloke	Western Bulldogs	30 years, 19 days	1	Collingwood	Traded in 2016
Nathan Brown	St Kilda	28 years, 98 days	1	Collingwood	Free agent in 2016
Jake Melksham	Melbourne	25 years, 208 days	1	Essendon	Traded in 2015
Jake Carlisle	St Kilda	25 years, 175 days	1	Essendon	Traded in 2015
Jack Steele	St Kilda	21 years, 102 days	1	Greater Western Sydney	Traded in 2016
Jordan Lewis	Melbourne	30 years, 335 days	1	Hawthorn	Traded in 2016
Pearce Hanley	Gold Coast	28 years, 130 days	1	Brisbane Lions	Traded in 2016
Michael Barlow	Gold Coast	29 years, 97 days	1	Fremantle	Delisted free agent in 2016
Jarryd Lyons	Gold Coast	24 years, 246 days	1	Adelaide	Traded in 2016
Jarrod Witts	Gold Coast	24 years, 193 days	1	Collingwood	Traded in 2016
Jake Barrett	Brisbane Lions	21 years, 137 days	1	Greater Western Sydney	Pick 2, 2017 rookie draft
Ty Vickery	Hawthorn	26 years, 298 days	1	Richmond	Free agent in 2016
Ricky Henderson	Hawthorn	28 years, 195 days	1	Adelaide	Delisted free agent in 2016
Josh Green	Essendon	24 years, 213 days	1	Brisbane Lions	Delisted free agent in 2016
Jaeger O'Meara	Hawthorn	23 years, 31 days	1	Gold Coast	Traded in 2016
Tom Mitchell	Hawthorn	23 years, 298 days	1	Sydney	Traded in 2016
Sam Mitchell	West Coast	34 years, 165 days	1	Hawthorn	Traded in 2016
Nathan Vardy	West Coast	25 years, 274 days	1	Geelong	Traded in 2016
Marley Williams	North Melbourne	23 years, 247 days	1	Collingwood	Traded in 2016
Nathan Hrovat	North Melbourne	22 years, 292 days	1	Western Bulldogs	Traded in 2016
Drew Petrie	West Coast	34 years, 162 days	1	North Melbourne	Pick 29, 2017 rookie draft
Tendai Mzungu	Greater Western Sydney	31 years, 27 days	1	Fremantle	Pick 15, 2017 rookie draft
Curtly Hampton	Adelaide	24 years, 16 days	1	Greater Western Sydney	Traded in 2015
Troy Menzel	Adelaide	22 years, 185 days	1	Carlton	Traded in 2015
Zach Tuohy	Geelong	27 years, 106 days	1	Carlton	Traded in 2016
Bradley Hill	Fremantle	23 years, 260 days	1	Hawthorn	Traded in 2016
Shane Kersten	Fremantle	24 years, 11 days	1	Geelong	Traded in 2016
Cam McCarthy	Fremantle	21 years, 359 days	1	Greater Western Sydney	Traded in 2016
Joel Hamling	Fremantle	23 years, 351 days	1	Western Bulldogs	Traded in 2016
Jack Frost	Brisbane Lions	25 years, 36 days	2	Collingwood	Traded in 2016
Aaron Black	Geelong	26 years, 145 days	5	North Melbourne	Traded in 2016
Michael Hibberd	Melbourne	27 years, 112 days	5	Essendon	Traded in 2016
Daniel Wells	Collingwood	32 years, 82 days	5	North Melbourne	Free agent in 2016
Koby Stevens	St Kilda	25 years, 315 days	6	West Coast, Western Bulldogs	Traded in 2016
Alex Silvagni	Carlton	29 years, 212 days	6	Fremantle	Pick 23, 2017 rookie draft
Lynden Dunn	Collingwood	29 years, 351 days	6	Melbourne	Traded in 2016
James Stewart	Essendon	23 years, 71 days	8	Greater Western Sydney	Traded in 2016
Matt de Boer	Greater Western Sydney	27 years, 72 days	9	Fremantle	Pick 58, 2016 national draft
Dawson Simpson	Greater Western Sydney	28 years, 163 days	19	Geelong	Free agent in 2015
Brett Deledio	Greater Western Sydney	30 years, 110 days	20	Richmond	Traded in 2016
Harley Bennell	Fremantle	24 years, 322 days	22	Gold Coast	Traded in 2015
