= 2017 Collingwood Football Club season =

Collingwood Football Club
2017 season
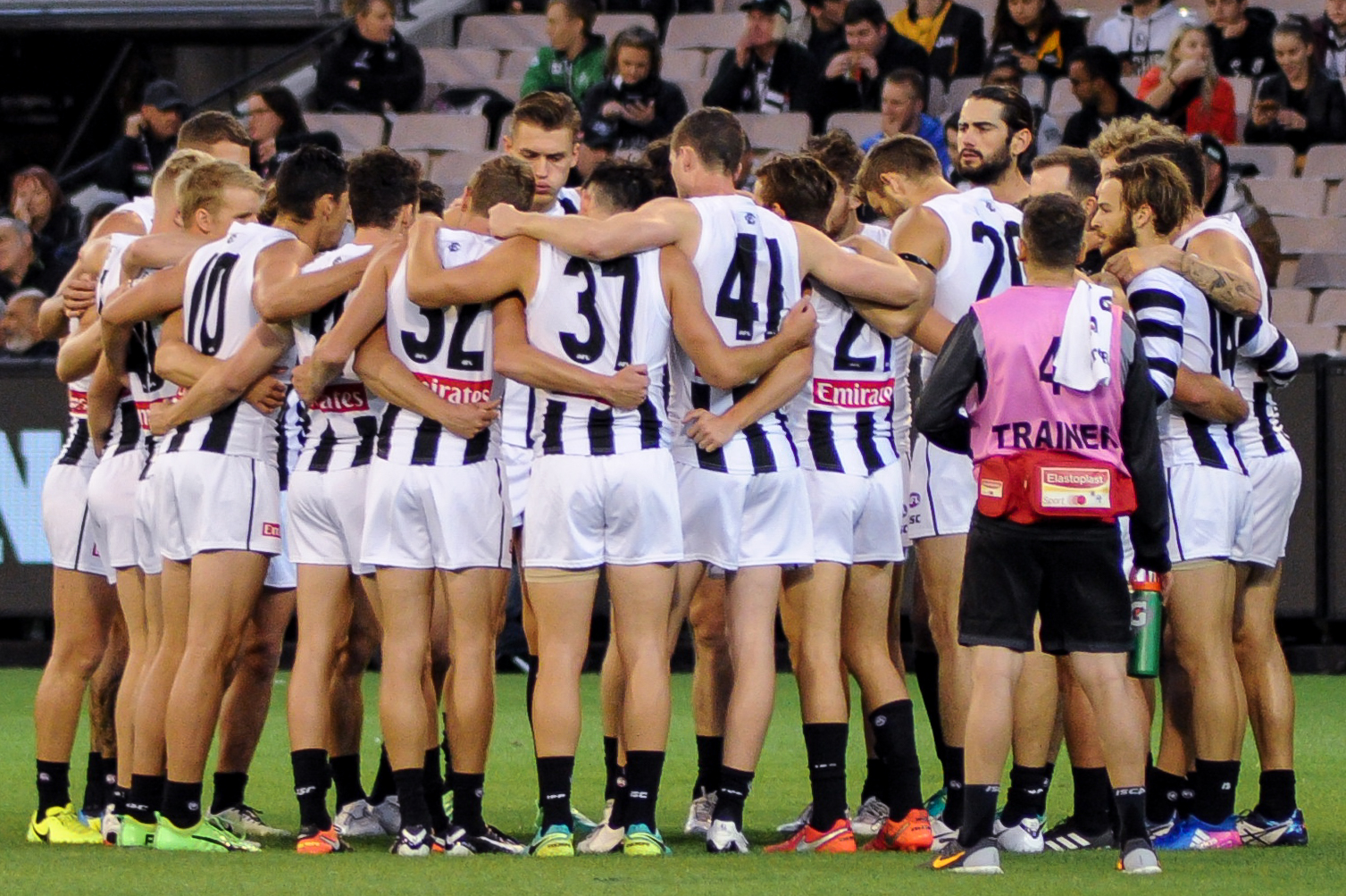
- Huddle during the round two match against Richmond
- President: Eddie McGuire
- Coach: Nathan Buckley (6th season)
- Captains: Scott Pendlebury (4th season)
- Home ground: The MCG
- Regular season: 13th
- Finals series: DNQ
- Best and Fairest: Steele Sidebottom
- Leading goalkicker: Jamie Elliott (34 goals)
- Highest home attendance: 70,279 vs. Carlton (Round 7)
- Lowest home attendance: 22,927 vs. West Coast (Round 18)
- Average home attendance: 46,878
- Club membership: 75,879

The 2017 Collingwood Football Club season was the club's 121st season of senior competition in the Australian Football League (AFL). The club also fielded its reserves team in the VFL, and a women's team in the inaugural AFL Women's competition.

== Squad ==
Players are listed by guernsey number, and 2017 statistics are for AFL regular season and finals series matches during the 2017 AFL season only. Career statistics include a player's complete AFL career, which, as a result, means that a player's debut and part or whole of their career statistics may be for another club. Statistics are correct as of Round 23 of the 2017 season (26 August 2017) and are taken from AFL Tables. Please note that this squad refers to AFL-listed players at the club. An additional 24 players not listed here are signed by the club as VFL-listed players, meaning they can only play for the club's seconds team.

| No. | Name | AFL debut | Games (2017) | Goals (2017) | Games (CFC) | Goals (CFC) | Games (AFL career) | Goals (AFL career) |
|---|---|---|---|---|---|---|---|---|
| 1 | Alex Fasolo | 2011 | 19 | 29 | 100 | 133 | 100 | 133 |
| 2 | Jordan De Goey | 2015 | 14 | 14 | 50 | 36 | 50 | 36 |
| 3 | Daniel Wells | 2003 (North Melbourne) | 10 | 11 | 10 | 11 | 253 | 161 |
| 4 | Brodie Grundy | 2013 | 20 | 4 | 82 | 27 | 82 | 27 |
| 5 | Jamie Elliott | 2012 | 17 | 34 | 89 | 138 | 89 | 138 |
| 6 | Tyson Goldsack | 2007 | 20 | 1 | 161 | 50 | 161 | 50 |
| 7 | Adam Treloar | 2012 (Greater Western Sydney) | 21 | 13 | 43 | 26 | 122 | 74 |
| 8 | Tom Langdon | 2014 | 11 | 0 | 57 | 2 | 57 | 2 |
| 9 | Jesse White | 2008 (Sydney) | 4 | 5 | 56 | 75 | 127 | 148 |
| 10 | Scott Pendlebury (c) | 2006 | 16 | 5 | 252 | 157 | 252 | 157 |
| 11 | Jarryd Blair | 2010 | 12 | 11 | 155 | 121 | 155 | 121 |
| 12 | Matthew Scharenberg | 2015 | 10 | 0 | 14 | 0 | 14 | 0 |
| 13 | Taylor Adams | 2012 (Greater Western Sydney) | 22 | 9 | 66 | 24 | 97 | 36 |
| 14 | James Aish | 2014 (Brisbane Lions) | 8 | 1 | 23 | 11 | 55 | 19 |
| 15 | Lynden Dunn | 2006 (Melbourne) | 17 | 1 | 17 | 1 | 182 | 98 |
| 16 | Chris Mayne | 2008 (Fremantle) | 3 | 2 | 3 | 2 | 175 | 198 |
| 17 | Callum Brown | 2017 | 5 | 1 | 5 | 1 | 5 | 1 |
| 18 | Travis Varcoe | 2007 (Geelong) | 8 | 2 | 47 | 18 | 185 | 148 |
| 19 | Levi Greenwood | 2009 (North Melbourne) | 16 | 7 | 45 | 29 | 119 | 55 |
| 20 | Ben Reid | 2007 | 15 | 14 | 136 | 51 | 136 | 51 |
| 21 | Tom Phillips | 2016 | 18 | 9 | 24 | 12 | 24 | 12 |
| 22 | Steele Sidebottom | 2009 | 22 | 16 | 185 | 139 | 185 | 139 |
| 23 | Lachlan Keeffe | 2011 | 0 | 0 | 40 | 7 | 40 | 7 |
| 24 | Josh Thomas | 2013 | 9 | 6 | 41 | 25 | 41 | 25 |
| 25 | Jack Crisp | 2012 (Brisbane Lions) | 22 | 6 | 66 | 31 | 84 | 41 |
| 26 | Josh Daicos | 2017 | 2 | 1 | 2 | 1 | 2 | 1 |
| 27 | Kayle Kirby | 2017 | 1 | 0 | 1 | 0 | 1 | 0 |
| 28 | Ben Sinclair | 2011 | 0 | 0 | 63 | 22 | 63 | 22 |
| 29 | Tim Broomhead | 2014 | 14 | 8 | 35 | 27 | 35 | 27 |
| 30 | Darcy Moore | 2015 | 21 | 25 | 47 | 58 | 47 | 58 |
| 31 | Jackson Ramsay | 2014 | 8 | 0 | 17 | 0 | 17 | 0 |
| 32 | Will Hoskin-Elliott | 2012 (Greater Western Sydney) | 22 | 18 | 22 | 18 | 74 | 60 |
| 33 | Rupert Wills | 2016 | 1 | 0 | 6 | 1 | 6 | 1 |
| 34 | Mitch McCarthy | **** | 0 | 0 | 0 | 0 | 0 | 0 |
| 35 | Sam McLarty | **** | 0 | 0 | 0 | 0 | 0 | 0 |
| 36 | Brayden Sier | **** | 0 | 0 | 0 | 0 | 0 | 0 |
| 37 | Brayden Maynard | 2015 | 22 | 6 | 51 | 12 | 51 | 12 |
| 38 | Jeremy Howe | 2011 (Melbourne) | 21 | 3 | 41 | 6 | 141 | 86 |
| 39 | Ben Crocker | 2016 | 3 | 3 | 13 | 13 | 13 | 13 |
| 40 | Josh Smith | 2016 | 13 | 2 | 31 | 6 | 31 | 6 |
| 41 | Henry Schade | 2015 (Gold Coast) | 8 | 1 | 8 | 1 | 28 | 1 |
| 43 | Adam Oxley | 2013 | 0 | 0 | 31 | 9 | 31 | 9 |
| 44 | Liam Mackie | **** | 0 | 0 | 0 | 0 | 0 | 0 |
| 45 | Max Lynch | **** | 0 | 0 | 0 | 0 | 0 | 0 |
| 46 | Mason Cox | 2016 | 9 | 10 | 20 | 27 | 20 | 27 |

=== Squad changes ===
==== In ====
| No. | Name | Position | Previous club | via |
|---|---|---|---|---|
| 3 | (Western Australia) Daniel Wells | Midfielder | North Melbourne | free agent |
| 16 | (Western Australia) Chris Mayne | Forward | Fremantle | free agent |
| 32 | (Victoria (state)) Will Hoskin-Elliott | Midfielder / Forward | Greater Western Sydney | trade |
| 15 | (Victoria (state)) Lynden Dunn | Defender | Melbourne | trade |
| 35 | (Victoria (state)) Sam McLarty | Defender | Oakleigh Chargers | AFL National Draft, second round (pick No. 30) |
| 17 | (Victoria (state)) Callum Brown | Midfielder | Eastern Ranges | AFL National Draft, second round (pick No. 35), Father–son rule selection - son of Gavin Brown |
| 27 | (Victoria (state)) Kayle Kirby | Forward | Bendigo Pioneers | AFL National Draft, third round (pick No. 50) |
| 26 | (Victoria (state)) Josh Daicos | Forward | Oakleigh Chargers | AFL National Draft, fourth round (pick No. 57), Father–son rule selection - son of Peter Daicos |
| 34 | (Victoria (state)) Mitch McCarthy | Ruck | Dandenong Stingrays | AFL Rookie Draft, first round (pick No. 7) |
| 41 | (Tasmania) Henry Schade | Defender | Gold Coast | AFL Rookie Draft, second round (pick No. 24) |
| 44 | (South Australia) Liam Mackie | Defender | Glenelg | AFL Rookie Draft, third round (pick No. 40) |
| 45 | (Victoria (state)) Max Lynch | Ruck | Murray Bushrangers | AFL Rookie Draft, fourth round (pick No. 51) |

==== Out ====
| No. | Name | Position | New Club | via |
|---|---|---|---|---|
| 27 | (Victoria (state)) Matthew Goodyear | Midfielder | | delisted |
| 41 | (Victoria (state)) Tim Golds | Defender | | delisted |
| 47 | (Victoria (state)) Darrean Wyatt | | | delisted |
| 16 | (Victoria (state)) Nathan Brown | Defender | St Kilda | free agent |
| 15 | (New South Wales) Jarrod Witts | Ruck | Gold Coast | trade |
| 32 | (Victoria (state)) Travis Cloke | Forward | Western Bulldogs | trade |
| 45 | (Victoria (state)) Jack Frost | Defender | Brisbane Lions | trade |
| 26 | (Western Australia) Marley Williams | Defender | North Melbourne | trade |
| 44 | (Western Australia) Corey Gault | Forward | | retired |
| 17 | (Western Australia) Jonathon Marsh | Defender | | retired |
| 9 | (Victoria (state)) Jesse White | Forward | | retired |

== AFL season ==
=== Pre-season matches ===
Collingwood's 2017 JLT Community Series fixtures
| Date and local time | Opponent | Scores^{[a]} | | | Venue | Attendance | Ref |
| Date and local time | Opponent | Home | Away | Result | Venue | Attendance | Ref |
|---|---|---|---|---|---|---|---|
| Thursday, 16 February (7:40 pm) | Essendon | 2.13.9 (105) | 0.14.10 (94) | Won by 11 points | Etihad Stadium [H] | 16,521 | |
| Saturday, 4 March (1:40 pm) | Fremantle | 1.11.12 (87) | 1.12.4 (85) | Lost by 2 points | Rushton Park [A] | 5,500 | |
| Saturday, 11 March (1:10 pm) | Richmond | 0.16.11 (107) | 1.15.15 (114) | Won by 7 points | Ted Summerton Reserve [A] | 5,701 | |

=== Regular season ===
Collingwood's 2017 AFL season fixtures
| Round | Date and local time | Opponent | Home | Away | Result | Venue | Attendance | Ladder position | Ref |
| Round | Date and local time | Opponent | Scores^{[a]} | | | Venue | Attendance | Ladder position | Ref |
|---|---|---|---|---|---|---|---|---|---|
| 1 | Friday, 24 March (7:50 pm) | Western Bulldogs | 12.14 (86) | 15.10 (100) | Lost by 14 points | MCG [H] | 66,254 | 11th | |
| 2 | Thursday, 30 March (7:20 pm) | Richmond | 14.15 (99) | 11.14 (80) | Lost by 19 points | MCG [A] | 58,236 | 11th | |
| 3 | Friday, 7 April (7:50 pm) | Sydney | 11.13 (79) | 11.14 (80) | Won by 1 point | SCG [A] | 35,310 | 12th | |
| 4 | Sunday, 16 April (3:20 pm) | St Kilda | 7.13 (55) | 9.15 (69) | Lost by 14 points | Etihad Stadium [H] | 36,650 | 13th | |
| 5 | Tuesday, 25 April (3:20 pm) | Essendon | 15.10 (100) | 11.16 (82) | Lost by 18 points | MCG [A] | 87,685 | 13th | |
| 6 | Sunday, 30 April (3:20 pm) | Geelong | 11.12 (78) | 15.17 (107) | Won by 29 points | MCG [A] | 46,457 | 12th | |
| 7 | Saturday, 6 May (2:10 pm) | Carlton | 8.8 (56) | 12.7 (79) | Lost by 23 points | MCG [H] | 70,279 | 15th | |
| 8 | Saturday, 13 May (4:35 pm) | Greater Western Sydney | 15.12 (102) | 15.9 (99) | Lost by 3 points | Spotless Stadium [A] | 11,360 | 17th | |
| 9 | Saturday, 20 May (7:25 pm) | Hawthorn | 13.12 (90) | 11.6 (72) | Won by 18 points | MCG [H] | 54,252 | 13th | |
| 10 | Sunday, 28 May (1:10 pm) | Brisbane Lions | 18.21 (129) | 13.6 (84) | Won by 45 points | MCG [H] | 32,750 | 12th | |
| 11 | Sunday, 4 June (2:40 pm) | Fremantle | 12.13 (85) | 15.15 (105) | Won by 20 points | Domain Stadium [A] | 34,259 | 10th | |
| 12 | Monday, 12 June (3:20 pm) | Melbourne | 15.14 (104) | 15.10 (100) | Lost by 4 points | MCG [A] | 70,926 | 11th | |
| 13 | Bye | | | | | | | 13th | |
| 14 | Saturday, 24 June (1:45 pm) | Port Adelaide | 9.8 (62) | 13.15 (93) | Lost by 31 points | MCG [H] | 36,622 | 13th | |
| 15 | Sunday, 2 July (3:20 pm) | Hawthorn | 18.10 (118) | 14.10 (94) | Lost by 24 points | MCG [A] | 56,593 | 15th | |
| 16 | Saturday, 8 July (2:10 pm) | Essendon | 12.8 (80) | 18.9 (117) | Lost by 37 points | MCG [H] | 63,537 | 15th | |
| 17 | Saturday, 15 July (4:35 pm) | Gold Coast | 13.10 (88) | 15.13 (103) | Won by 15 points | Metricon Stadium [A] | 17,275 | 14th | |
| 18 | Sunday, 23 July (3:20 pm) | West Coast | 13.15 (93) | 13.7 (85) | Won by 8 points | Etihad Stadium [H] | 22,927 | 13th | |
| 19 | Sunday, 30 July (3:20 pm) | Adelaide | 15.13 (103) | 16.7 (103) | Draw | MCG [H] | 33,269 | 13th | |
| 20 | Saturday, 5 August (7:25 pm) | North Melbourne | 7.15 (57) | 16.15 (111) | Won by 54 points | Etihad Stadium [A] | 33,994 | 12th | |
| 21 | Sunday, 13 August (4:10 pm) | Port Adelaide | 14.14 (98) | 10.11 (71) | Lost by 27 points | Adelaide Oval [A] | 37,533 | 13th | |
| 22 | Saturday, 19 August (2:10 pm) | Geelong | 9.5 (59) | 10.10 (70) | Lost by 11 points | MCG [H] | 47,889 | 13th | |
| 23 | Saturday, 26 August (1:45 pm) | Melbourne | 14.15 (99) | 12.11 (83) | Won by 16 points | MCG [H] | 51,223 | 13th | |

=== Ladder ===
| Pos | Team | Pld | W | L | D | PF | PA | PP | Pts | Qualification |
|---|---|---|---|---|---|---|---|---|---|---|
| 1 | Adelaide | 22 | 15 | 6 | 1 | 2415 | 1776 | 136.0 | 62 | 2017 finals |
| 2 | Geelong | 22 | 15 | 6 | 1 | 2134 | 1818 | 117.4 | 62 | 2017 finals |
| 3 | Richmond (P) | 22 | 15 | 7 | 0 | 1992 | 1684 | 118.3 | 60 | 2017 finals |
| 4 | Greater Western Sydney | 22 | 14 | 6 | 2 | 2081 | 1812 | 114.8 | 60 | 2017 finals |
| 5 | Port Adelaide | 22 | 14 | 8 | 0 | 2168 | 1671 | 129.7 | 56 | 2017 finals |
| 6 | Sydney | 22 | 14 | 8 | 0 | 2093 | 1651 | 126.8 | 56 | 2017 finals |
| 7 | Essendon | 22 | 12 | 10 | 0 | 2135 | 2004 | 106.5 | 48 | 2017 finals |
| 8 | West Coast | 22 | 12 | 10 | 0 | 1964 | 1858 | 105.7 | 48 | 2017 finals |
| 9 | Melbourne | 22 | 12 | 10 | 0 | 2035 | 1934 | 105.2 | 48 | |
| 10 | Western Bulldogs | 22 | 11 | 11 | 0 | 1857 | 1913 | 97.1 | 44 | |
| 11 | St Kilda | 22 | 11 | 11 | 0 | 1925 | 1986 | 96.9 | 44 | |
| 12 | Hawthorn | 22 | 10 | 11 | 1 | 1864 | 2055 | 90.7 | 42 | |
| 13 | Collingwood | 22 | 9 | 12 | 1 | 1944 | 1963 | 99.0 | 38 | |
| 14 | Fremantle | 22 | 8 | 14 | 0 | 1607 | 2160 | 74.4 | 32 | |
| 15 | North Melbourne | 22 | 6 | 16 | 0 | 1983 | 2264 | 87.6 | 24 | |
| 16 | Carlton | 22 | 6 | 16 | 0 | 1594 | 2038 | 78.2 | 24 | |
| 17 | Gold Coast | 22 | 6 | 16 | 0 | 1756 | 2311 | 76.0 | 24 | |
| 18 | Brisbane Lions | 22 | 5 | 17 | 0 | 1877 | 2526 | 74.3 | 20 | |

Source: AFL
Rules for classification: 1) points; 2) percentage; 3) number of points for.
(P) Premiers

=== Awards & Milestones ===
==== AFL Award Nominations ====
- Round 3 – 2017 AFL Goal of the Year nomination – Adam Treloar
- Round 8 – 2017 AFL Goal of the Year nomination – Steele Sidebottom
- Round 8 – 2017 AFL Mark of the Year nomination – Jeremy Howe
- Round 9 – 2017 AFL Rising Star nomination – Tom Phillips
- Round 11 – 2017 AFL Mark of the Year nomination – Jeremy Howe
- Round 12 – 2017 AFL Mark of the Year nomination – Jeremy Howe
- Round 14 – 2017 AFL Mark of the Year nomination – Brodie Grundy
- Round 23 – 2017 AFL Goal of the Year nomination – Jamie Elliott
- Round 23 – 2017 AFL Mark of the Year nomination – Jeremy Howe
- 2017 All-Australian team 40-man squad – Jeremy Howe, Adam Treloar

==== Club Awards ====
- E.W. Copeland Trophy – Steele Sidebottom
- R.T. Rush Trophy – Taylor Adams
- J.J. Joyce Trophy – Adam Treloar
- J.F. McHale Trophy – Jeremy Howe
- Jack Regan Trophy – Brodie Grundy
- Joseph Wren Memorial Trophy – Marty Hore
- Darren Millane Memorial Trophy – Tyson Goldsack
- Harry Collier Trophy – Callum Brown
- Gordon Coventry Trophy – Jamie Elliott

==== Milestones ====
- Round 1 – Will Hoskin-Elliott (Collingwood debut)
- Round 1 – Chris Mayne (Collingwood debut)
- Round 1 – Henry Schade (Collingwood debut)
- Round 1 – Tyson Goldsack (50 goals)
- Round 5 – Daniel Wells (Collingwood debut)
- Round 6 – Lynden Dunn (Collingwood debut)
- Round 6 – Taylor Adams (50 Collingwood games)
- Round 6 – Jack Crisp (50 Collingwood games)
- Round 6 – Will Hoskin-Elliott (50 AFL goals)
- Round 9 – Tyson Goldsack (150 games)
- Round 9 – James Aish (50 AFL games)
- Round 9 – Levi Greenwood (50 AFL goals)
- Round 12 – Callum Brown (AFL debut)
- Round 14 – Darcy Moore (50 goals)
- Round 15 – Scott Pendlebury (250 games)
- Round 16 – Collingwood's 2500th VFL/AFL game
- Round 16 – Tom Langdon (50 games)
- Round 17 – Daniel Wells (250 AFL games)
- Round 17 – Jarryd Blair (150 games)
- Round 21 – Alex Fasolo (100 games)
- Round 21 – Jordan De Goey (50 games)
- Round 21 – Ben Reid (50 goals)
- Round 22 – Josh Daicos (AFL debut)
- Round 22 – Brayden Maynard (50 games)
- Round 23 – Kayle Kirby (AFL debut)

== VFL season ==
=== Pre-season matches ===
Collingwood's 2017 VFL pre-season fixture
| Date and local time | Opponent | Home | Away | Result | Venue | Ref |
| Date and local time | Opponent | Scores^{[a]} | | | Venue | Ref |
|---|---|---|---|---|---|---|
| Saturday, 11 March (11:30 am) | Geelong | 10.10 (70) | 10.8 (68) | Won by 2 points | Holden Centre [H] | |
| Friday, 24 March (4:15 pm) | Footscray | 9.8 (62) | 17.8 (110) | Lost by 48 points | Holden Centre [H] | |
| Thursday, 30 March (4:00 pm) | Richmond | 20.10 (130) | 10.6 (66) | Lost by 64 points | Punt Road Oval [A] | |
| Saturday, 8 April (12:00 pm) | North Ballarat | 19.18 (132) | 5.8 (38) | Won by 94 points | Holden Centre [H] | |

=== Regular season ===
Collingwood's 2017 VFL season fixture
| Round | Date and local time | Opponent | Home | Away | Result | Venue | Ladder position | Ref |
| Round | Date and local time | Opponent | Scores^{[a]} | | | Venue | Ladder position | Ref |
|---|---|---|---|---|---|---|---|---|
| 1 | Saturday, 15 April (2:40 pm) | Coburg | 9.8 (62) | 9.10 (64) | Won by 2 points | Piranha Park [A] | 6th | |
| 2 | Sunday, 23 April (1:00 pm) | Essendon | 18.10 (118) | 5.8 (38) | Lost by 80 points | Windy Hill [A] | 11th | |
| 3 | Saturday, 29 April (2:00 pm) | Sandringham | 17.11 (113) | 12.21 (93) | Lost by 20 points | Trevor Barker Oval [A] | 12th | |
| 4 | Sunday, 7 May (1:00 pm) | Northern Blues | 6.10 (46) | 9.5 (59) | Lost by 13 points | Victoria Park [H] | 12th | |
| 5 | Saturday, 13 May (2:00 pm) | Werribee | 17.10 (112) | 15.11 (101) | Lost by 11 points | Wangaratta Showgrounds [A] | 12th | |
| 6 | Saturday, 20 May (3:45 pm) | Box Hill | 11.10 (76) | 16.6 (102) | Lost by 26 points | Holden Centre [H] | 12th | |
| 7 | Sunday, 4 June (12:00 pm) | Sandringham | 14.8 (92) | 11.12 (78) | Won by 14 points | Victoria Park [H] | 12th | |
| 8 | Saturday, 10 June (2:00 pm) | Casey | 15.12 (102) | 13.5 (83) | Lost by 19 points | Casey Fields [A] | 12th | |
| 9 | Bye | | | | | | 12th | |
| 10 | Saturday, 24 June (2:00 pm) | Port Melbourne | 13.9 (87) | 19.10 (124) | Won by 37 points | North Port Oval [A] | 12th | |
| 11 | Sunday, 2 July (11:45 am) | Footscray | 13.7 (85) | 12.8 (80) | Won by 5 points | Victoria Park [H] | 12th | |
| 12 | Saturday, 8 July (1:00 pm) | Geelong | 7.8 (50) | 11.10 (76) | Won by 26 points | Simonds Stadium [A] | 11th | |
| 13 | Saturday, 15 July (1:00 pm) | Williamstown | 10.10 (70) | 20.10 (120) | Lost by 60 points | Victoria Park [H] | 11th | |
| 14 | Sunday, 23 July (10:20 am) | Richmond | 16.6 (102) | 14.20 (104) | Won by 2 points | Punt Road Oval [A] | 11th | |
| 15 | Sunday, 30 July (11:45 am) | Essendon | 13.8 (86) | 15.10 (100) | Lost by 14 points | Victoria Park [H] | 11th | |
| 16 | Saturday, 5 August (3:45 pm) | Werribee | 11.4 (70) | 15.12 (102) | Won by 32 points | Etihad Stadium [A] | 10th | |
| 17 | Sunday, 13 August (1:00 pm) | North Ballarat | 19.14 (128) | 6.5 (41) | Won by 87 points | Victoria Park [H] | 8th | |
| 18 | Saturday, 19 August (10:45 am) | Geelong | 9.17 (71) | 11.10 (76) | Lost by 5 points | Holden Centre [H] | 8th | |
| 19 | Saturday, 26 August (10:45 am) | Port Melbourne | 8.11 (59) | 9.11 (65) | Lost by 6 points | Holden Centre [H] | 8th | |

=== Finals series ===
Collingwood's 2017 VFL finals series fixture
| Round | Date and local time | Opponent | Home | Away | Result | Venue | Ref |
| Round | Date and local time | Opponent | Scores^{[a]} | | | Venue | Ref |
|---|---|---|---|---|---|---|---|
| 1st Elimination Final | Saturday, 2 September (2:40 pm) | Richmond | 12.13 (85) | 11.7 (73) | Lost by 12 points | Fortburn Stadium [A] | |
Collingwood was eliminated from the 2017 VFL finals series

=== Ladder ===
| Pos | Team | Pld | W | L | D | PF | PA | PP | Pts |
|---|---|---|---|---|---|---|---|---|---|
| 1 | Williamstown | 18 | 14 | 4 | 0 | 1812 | 1144 | 158.4 | 56 |
| 2 | Box Hill Hawks | 18 | 13 | 4 | 1 | 1821 | 1435 | 126.9 | 54 |
| 3 | Port Melbourne | 18 | 12 | 5 | 1 | 1694 | 1231 | 137.6 | 50 |
| 4 | Casey Demons | 18 | 12 | 6 | 0 | 1417 | 1328 | 106.7 | 48 |
| 5 | Richmond | 18 | 11 | 7 | 0 | 1917 | 1348 | 142.2 | 44 |
| 6 | Essendon | 18 | 10 | 8 | 0 | 1653 | 1311 | 126.1 | 40 |
| 7 | Footscray | 18 | 10 | 8 | 0 | 1694 | 1391 | 121.8 | 40 |
| 8 | Collingwood | 18 | 8 | 10 | 0 | 1498 | 1547 | 96.8 | 32 |
| 9 | Northern Blues | 18 | 8 | 10 | 0 | 1368 | 1542 | 88.7 | 32 |
| 10 | Geelong | 18 | 8 | 10 | 0 | 1367 | 1575 | 86.8 | 32 |
| 11 | Sandringham | 18 | 8 | 10 | 0 | 1492 | 1744 | 85.6 | 32 |
| 12 | Werribee | 18 | 8 | 10 | 0 | 1445 | 1752 | 82.5 | 32 |
| 13 | Coburg | 18 | 2 | 16 | 0 | 1142 | 2032 | 56.2 | 8 |
| 14 | North Ballarat | 18 | 1 | 17 | 0 | 1084 | 2024 | 53.6 | 4 |

Updated to match(es) played on 27 August 2017. Source: SportsTG
Rules for classification: 1) points; 2) percentage; 3) number of points for.

== Women's season ==
=== Regular season ===
Collingwood's 2017 AFL Women's season fixture
| Round | Date and local time | Opponent | Home | Away | Result | Venue | Attendance | Ladder position | Ref |
| Round | Date and local time | Opponent | Scores^{[a]} | | | Venue | Attendance | Ladder position | Ref |
|---|---|---|---|---|---|---|---|---|---|
| 1 | Friday, 3 February (7:45 pm) | Carlton | 7.4 (46) | 1.5 (11) | Lost by 35 points | Ikon Park [A] | 24,568 | 8th | |
| 2 | Saturday, 11 February (7:40 pm) | Melbourne | 4.1 (25) | 7.2 (44) | Lost by 19 points | Ikon Park [H] | 6,916 | 8th | |
| 3 | Saturday, 18 February (3:35 pm) | Brisbane | 4.3 (27) | 3.5 (23) | Lost by 4 points | South Pine Sports Complex [A] | 5,500 | 8th | |
| 4 | Saturday, 25 February (7:10 pm) | Western Bulldogs | 3.7 (25) | 5.2 (32) | Won by 7 points | VU Whitten Oval [A] | 6,733 | 6th | |
| 5 | Saturday, 4 March (10:35 am) | Fremantle | 4.7 (31) | 5.2 (32) | Won by 1 point | Rushton Park [A] | 2,800 | 5th | |
| 6 | Sunday, 12 March (11:05 am) | Greater Western Sydney | 7.13 (55) | 3.1 (19) | Won by 36 points | Olympic Park Oval [H] | 2,700 | 5th | |
| 7 | Sunday, 19 March (1:35 pm) | Adelaide | 7.4 (46) | 10.10 (70) | Lost by 24 points | Olympic Park Oval [H] | 2,500 | 5th | |

=== Ladder ===
| Pos | Team | Pld | W | L | D | PF | PA | PP | Pts | Qualification |
|---|---|---|---|---|---|---|---|---|---|---|
| 1 | Brisbane | 7 | 6 | 0 | 1 | 224 | 148 | 151.4 | 26 | Grand Final |
| 2 | Adelaide (P) | 7 | 5 | 2 | 0 | 291 | 185 | 157.3 | 20 | Grand Final |
| 3 | Melbourne | 7 | 5 | 2 | 0 | 258 | 183 | 141.0 | 20 | |
| 4 | Carlton | 7 | 3 | 3 | 1 | 261 | 232 | 112.5 | 14 | |
| 5 | Collingwood | 7 | 3 | 4 | 0 | 224 | 262 | 85.5 | 12 | |
| 6 | Western Bulldogs | 7 | 2 | 5 | 0 | 237 | 232 | 102.2 | 8 | |
| 7 | Fremantle | 7 | 1 | 5 | 1 | 191 | 298 | 64.1 | 6 | |
| 8 | Greater Western Sydney | 7 | 1 | 5 | 1 | 157 | 303 | 51.8 | 6 | |

Source: AFL.com.au
Rules for classification: 1) points; 2) percentage; 3) number of points for.
(P) Premiers

=== Squad ===
Players are listed by guernsey number, and 2017 statistics are for AFL Women's regular season and finals series matches during the 2017 AFL Women's season only. Career statistics include a player's complete AFL Women's career, which, as a result, means that a player's debut and part or whole of their career statistics may be for another club. Statistics are correct as of Round 7 of the 2017 season (19 March 2017) and are taken from Australian Football.

| No. | Name | AFLW debut | Games (2017) | Goals (2017) | Games (CFC) | Goals (CFC) | Games (AFLW career) | Goals (AFLW career) |
|---|---|---|---|---|---|---|---|---|
| 1 | Caitlyn Edwards | 2017 | 7 | 2 | 7 | 2 | 7 | 2 |
| 2 | Alicia Eva | 2017 | 7 | 3 | 7 | 3 | 7 | 3 |
| 3 | Penny Cula-Reid | 2017 | 2 | 0 | 2 | 0 | 2 | 0 |
| 4 | Sarah D'Arcy | 2017 | 7 | 2 | 7 | 2 | 7 | 2 |
| 5 | Emma Grant | 2017 | 7 | 1 | 7 | 1 | 7 | 1 |
| 6 | Christina Bernardi | 2017 | 6 | 2 | 6 | 2 | 6 | 2 |
| 7 | Lauren Tesoriero | 2017 | 5 | 0 | 5 | 0 | 5 | 0 |
| 8 | Brittany Bonnici | 2017 | 7 | 0 | 7 | 0 | 7 | 0 |
| 9 | Melissa Kuys | 2017 | 6 | 0 | 6 | 0 | 6 | 0 |
| 10 | Kendra Heil | **** | 0 | 0 | 0 | 0 | 0 | 0 |
| 11 | Helen Roden | 2017 | 1 | 0 | 1 | 0 | 1 | 0 |
| 12 | Stacey Livingstone | 2017 | 7 | 0 | 7 | 0 | 7 | 0 |
| 17 | Steph Chiocci (c) | 2017 | 7 | 1 | 7 | 1 | 7 | 1 |
| 18 | Ruby Schleicher | 2017 | 5 | 0 | 5 | 0 | 5 | 0 |
| 19 | Lou Wotton | 2017 | 3 | 0 | 3 | 0 | 3 | 0 |
| 20 | Cecilia McIntosh | 2017 | 6 | 1 | 6 | 1 | 6 | 1 |
| 21 | Nicola Stevens | 2017 | 7 | 0 | 7 | 0 | 7 | 0 |
| 22 | Sophie Casey | 2017 | 5 | 1 | 5 | 1 | 5 | 1 |
| 23 | Moana Hope | 2017 | 7 | 7 | 7 | 7 | 7 | 7 |
| 24 | Kate Sheahan | 2017 | 1 | 0 | 1 | 0 | 1 | 0 |
| 25 | Meg Hutchins | 2017 | 7 | 0 | 7 | 0 | 7 | 0 |
| 26 | Tara Morgan | 2017 | 7 | 0 | 7 | 0 | 7 | 0 |
| 27 | Jess Cameron | 2017 | 7 | 6 | 7 | 6 | 7 | 6 |
| 31 | Georgia Walker | 2017 | 2 | 0 | 2 | 0 | 2 | 0 |
| 33 | Bree White | 2017 | 7 | 1 | 7 | 1 | 7 | 1 |
| 38 | Amelia Barden | 2017 | 7 | 0 | 7 | 0 | 7 | 0 |
| 43 | Jasmine Garner | 2017 | 7 | 5 | 7 | 5 | 7 | 5 |
| 60 | Emma King | 2017 | 7 | 0 | 7 | 0 | 7 | 0 |

=== League awards ===
- Rising Star nomination – Brittany Bonnici – Round 6

=== Club Awards ===
- Best and fairest – Nicola Stevens
- Leading goalkicker – Moana Hope (7 goals)

== Notes ==
Key

- H Home match.
- A Away match.

Notes

- **^{a}** Collingwood's scores are indicated in **bold** font.
