= Dan Nielson =

Dan Nielson may refer to:

- Daniel Nielson (born 1996), Australian rules footballer
- Dan Nielson (basketball) (born 1983), American basketball coach
