= 2017 AFL Mark of the Year =

- Date: 14 July 2017
- Location: Etihad Stadium
- Winner: Joe Daniher (Essendon)

The Australian Football League celebrates the best mark of the season through the annual Mark of the Year competition. In 2017, this is officially known as the Woolworths AFL Mark of the Year. Each round three marks are nominated and fans are able to vote online for their favourite. The winner was Essendon's Joe Daniher, which surprised many fans and media personal who expected Jeremy Howe of Collingwood to win the award for his screamer against Melbourne in round 12. Following the shock win, Collingwood's president Eddie McGuire said that the voting system for Mark of the Year needs an overhaul.

== Winners by round ==
Legend

| = Round's winning mark |

| Round | Nominees | Team | % of votes | Opposition | Ground |
|---|---|---|---|---|---|
1
| 1 | Charlie Cameron | Adelaide | 40.0% | Greater Western Sydney | Adelaide Oval |
| 1 | Toby Greene | Greater Western Sydney | 32.7% | Adelaide | Adelaide Oval |
| 1 | Daniel Rioli | Richmond | 27.3% | Carlton | MCG |
| 2 | Tom Boyd | Western Bulldogs | 40.9% | Sydney | Etihad Stadium |
| 2 | Ben Griffiths | Richmond | 17.0% | Collingwood | MCG |
| 2 | Paul Puopolo | Hawthorn | 42.1% | Adelaide | MCG |
| 3 | Dean Kent | Melbourne | 26.4% | Geelong | Etihad Stadium |
| 3 | Shane Kersten | Fremantle | 43.7% | Western Bulldogs | Domain Stadium |
| 3 | Callum Mills | Sydney | 29.8% | Collingwood | SCG |
| 4 | Hayden Crozier | Fremantle | 22.6% | Melbourne | MCG |
| 4 | Nat Fyfe | Fremantle | 56.7% | Melbourne | MCG |
| 4 | Dayne Zorko | Brisbane Lions | 20.6% | Richmond | Gabba |
5
| 5 | Taylor Garner | North Melbourne | 52.5% | Fremantle | Domain Stadium |
| 5 | Liam Picken | Western Bulldogs | 18.6% | Brisbane Lions | Etihad Stadium |
| 5 | Cyril Rioli | Hawthorn | 28.8% | West Coast | MCG |
| 6 | Jake Carlisle | St Kilda | 25.8% | Hawthorn | University of Tasmania Stadium |
| 6 | Joe Daniher | Essendon | 41.9% | Melbourne | Etihad Stadium |
| 6 | Matthew Kennedy | Greater Western Sydney | 32.3% | Western Bulldogs | UNSW Canberra Oval |
| 7 | Marcus Adams | Western Bulldogs | 25.2% | Richmond | Etihad Stadium |
| 7 | Kayne Turner | North Melbourne | 37.8% | Adelaide | Blundstone Arena |
| 7 | Justin Westhoff | Port Adelaide | 37.0% | West Coast | Adelaide Oval |
| 8 | Joe Daniher | Essendon | 30.3% | Geelong | MCG |
| 8 | Jeremy Howe | Collingwood | 13.0% | Greater Western Sydney | Spotless Stadium |
| 8 | Easton Wood | Western Bulldogs | 56.7% | West Coast | Domain Stadium |
9
| 9 | Charlie Cameron | Adelaide | 44.8% | Brisbane Lions | Gabba |
| 9 | Callum Sinclair | Sydney | 26.0% | St Kilda | Etihad Stadium |
| 9 | Sam Lloyd | Richmond | 29.3% | Greater Western Sydney | Spotless Stadium |
| 10 | Joel Selwood | Geelong | 35.0% | Port Adelaide | Simonds Stadium |
| 10 | Mitch Hannan | Melbourne | 38.0% | Gold Coast | TIO Traeger Park |
| 10 | Eric Hipwood | Brisbane Lions | 27.0% | Collingwood | MCG |
| 11 | Joe Daniher | Essendon | 17.0% | Greater Western Sydney | Spotless Stadium |
| 11 | Jeremy Howe | Collingwood | 10.8% | Fremantle | Domain Stadium |
| 11 | Jarman Impey | Port Adelaide | 72.2% | Hawthorn | Adelaide Oval |
| 12 | Jarryn Geary | St Kilda | 5.0% | Adelaide | Adelaide Oval |
| 12 | Jeremy Howe | Collingwood | 86.3% | Melbourne | MCG |
| 12 | Luke Parker | Sydney | 8.7% | Western Bulldogs | SCG |
| 13 | Zaine Cordy | Western Bulldogs | 13.6% | Melbourne | Etihad Stadium |
| 13 | Robbie Gray | Port Adelaide | 57.8% | Brisbane Lions | Adelaide Oval |
| 13 | Jack Ziebell | North Melbourne | 28.6% | St Kilda | Etihad Stadium |
14
| 14 | Patrick Cripps | Carlton | 53.6% | Richmond | MCG |
| 14 | Joe Daniher | Essendon | 18.0% | Sydney | SCG |
| 14 | Brodie Grundy | Collingwood | 28.4% | Port Adelaide | MCG |
| 15 | Shane Biggs | Western Bulldogs | 10.0% | West Coast | Etihad Stadium |
| 15 | Bryce Gibbs | Carlton | 54.8% | Adelaide | MCG |
| 15 | Jack Riewoldt | Richmond | 35.2% | Port Adelaide | Adelaide Oval |
| 16 | Luke McDonald | North Melbourne | 24.6% | Fremantle | Etihad Stadium |
| 16 | Mitch McGovern | Adelaide | 57.9% | Western Bulldogs | Adelaide Oval |
| 16 | Daniel McKenzie | St Kilda | 17.4% | Richmond | Etihad Stadium |
| 17 | Charlie Cameron | Adelaide | 16.1% | Melbourne | TIO Stadium |
| 17 | Joe Daniher | Essendon | 79.7% | St Kilda | Etihad Stadium |
| 17 | Jack Darling | West Coast | 4.2% | Fremantle | Domain Stadium |
| 18 | Levi Casboult | Carlton | 29.3% | Brisbane Lions | Gabba |
| 18 | Mitch McGovern | Adelaide | 37.7% | Geelong | Adelaide Oval |
| 18 | Dean Towers | Sydney | 33.1% | St Kilda | SCG |
| 19 | Ben Brown | North Melbourne | 13.3% | Melbourne | Blundstone Arena |
| 19 | Hayden Crozier | Fremantle | 27.1% | Greater Western Sydney | Spotless Stadium |
| 19 | Mitch McGovern | Adelaide | 59.7% | Collingwood | MCG |
| 20 | Dan Butler | Richmond | 20.4% | Hawthorn | MCG |
| 20 | Griffin Logue | Fremantle | 12.5% | Gold Coast | Domain Stadium |
| 20 | Jack Silvagni | Carlton | 67.1% | Essendon | MCG |
21
| 21 | Josh Bruce | St Kilda | 34.7% | Melbourne | MCG |
| 21 | James Harmes | Melbourne | 30.8% | St Kilda | MCG |
| 21 | Paddy Ryder | Port Adelaide | 34.5% | Collingwood | Adelaide Oval |
| 22 | Wylie Buzza | Geelong | 30.4% | Collingwood | MCG |
| 22 | Daniel McStay | Brisbane Lions | 45.7% | Melbourne | MCG |
| 22 | Liam Picken | Western Bulldogs | 23.9% | Port Adelaide | Mars Stadium |
| 23 | Jack Darling | West Coast | 20.5% | Adelaide | Domain Stadium |
| 23 | Michael Hibberd | Melbourne | 18.7% | Collingwood | MCG |
| 23 | Jeremy Howe | Collingwood | 60.8% | Melbourne | MCG |

== Finalists ==
| Round | Nominees | Team | % of votes | Opposition | Ground | Description |
|---|---|---|---|---|---|---|
| 12 | Jeremy Howe | Collingwood | 40.7% | Melbourne | MCG | High-flying Magpie with Queen's Birthday leap that might just be his best |
| 14 | Brodie Grundy | Collingwood | 6.6% | Port Adelaide | MCG | Pies ruckman takes his lead from teammate Jeremy Howe to produce a stunning grab |
| 17 | Joe Daniher | Essendon | 52.7% | St Kilda | Etihad Stadium | Former teammate provides a stepladder for The Joe Show's season highlight |
