= Nick Larkey =

Australian rules footballer (born 1998)

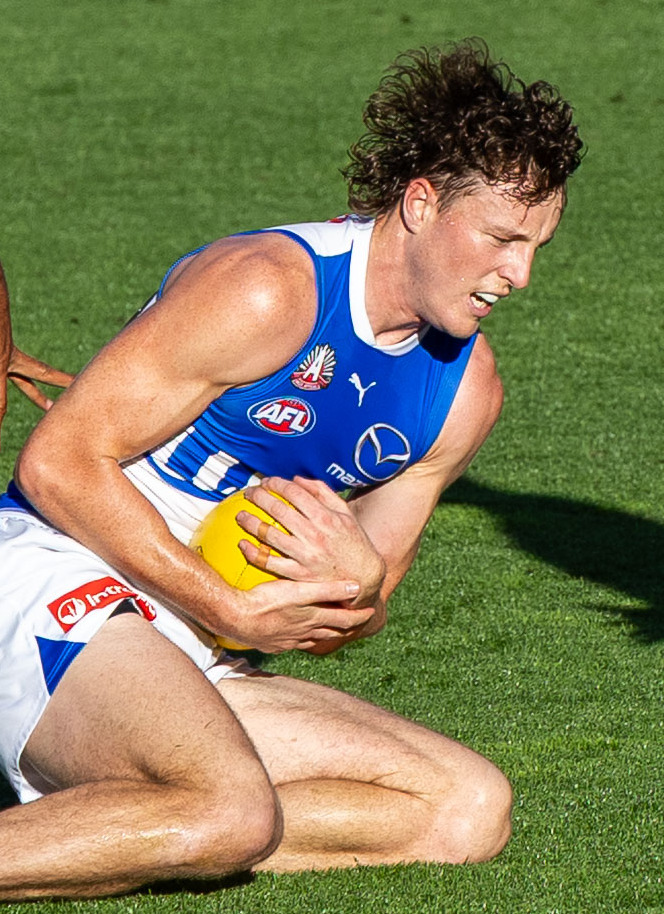
- Larkey in April 2025

Personal information
- Full name: Nick Larkey
- Nicknames: Souv, Souvlarkey
- Born: 6 June 1998 (age 28)
- Original team: Oakleigh Chargers (TAC Cup)
- Draft: No. 73, 2016 national draft
- Debut: Round 18, 2017, North Melbourne vs. Essendon, at Etihad Stadium
- Height: 198 cm (6 ft 6 in)
- Weight: 95 kg (209 lb)
- Position: Forward

Club information
- Current club: North Melbourne
- Number: 20

Playing career^{1}
Years	Club	Games (Goals)
2017–	North Melbourne	157 (323)
- ^{1} Playing statistics correct to the end of the 2026 season.

Career highlights
- North Melbourne captain: 2026–; All-Australian team: 2023; 6x North Melbourne leading goalkicker: 2021, 2022, 2023, 2024, 2025, 2026; NAB AFL Rising Star nominee: 2019; Frosty Miller Medal: 2018

Nick Larkey (born 6 June 1998) is a professional Australian rules footballer who plays for and captains the North Melbourne Football Club in the Australian Football League (AFL). He was drafted by North Melbourne with their fourth selection and seventy-third overall in the 2016 national draft. He made his debut against Essendon at Docklands Stadium in round eighteen of the 2017 season.

== AFL career ==
Larkey was selected by North Melbourne with pick 73 in the 2016 AFL draft. Prior he played junior football for Hawthorn Citizens and Kew Comets in the YJFL, before progressing to Oakleigh Chargers in the TAC Cup.

In 2018 Larkey won the VFL's leading goal-kicker award, the Jim 'Frosty' Miller Medal, after kicking 41 goals across 17 matches with the North Melbourne reserves team in that competition.

Larkey received a 2019 AFL Rising Star nomination in round 16 of the 2019 AFL season, for his five goal effort against St Kilda at Blundstone Arena.

In 2021, Larkey replaced Ben Brown as North’s key forward, playing 22 games that season and leading the team’s goal kicking tally with 42 goals. He followed that up with 38 goals in 2022 and 71 in 2023, putting him in the top three goalkickers for that year.

Larkey kicked a career high nine goals against the Gold Coast in the final round of 2023. His good form in that year was rewarded with a five-year contract extension to 2029.

Larkey was named in the All-Australian team in 2023.

In December 2025, Larkey was elected by his teammates to be the North Melbourne captain from the 2026 AFL season.

== Statistics ==
Updated to the end of round 22, 2026.

Legend
G	Goals	K	Kicks	D	Disposals	T	Tackles
B	Behinds	H	Handballs	M	Marks	H/O	Hit-outs

Season	Team	No.	Games	Totals								Averages (per game)								Votes
Season	Team	No.	Games	G	B	K	H	D	M	T	H/O	G	B	K	H	D	M	T	H/O	Votes
2017	North Melbourne	40	2	0	0	2	4	6	1	1	2	0.0	0.0	1.0	2.0	3.0	0.5	0.5	1.0	0
2018	North Melbourne	20	0	—	—	—	—	—	—	—	—	—	—	—	—	—	—	—	—	0
2019	North Melbourne	20	17	26	8	86	71	157	63	27	53	1.5	0.5	5.1	4.2	9.2	3.7	1.6	3.1	0
2020 (Note: The 2020 season was played with 17 home-and-away matches per team (down from 22) and 16-minute quarters with time on (down from 20-minute quarters with time on) due to the impact of the COVID-19 pandemic.)	North Melbourne	20	10	14	4	41	21	62	23	10	0	1.4	0.4	4.1	2.1	6.2	2.3	1.0	0.0	0
2021	North Melbourne	20	22	42	15	123	87	210	84	27	30	1.9	0.7	5.6	4.0	9.5	3.8	1.2	1.4	3
2022	North Melbourne	20	20	38	18	127	67	194	76	13	0	1.9	0.9	6.4	3.4	9.7	3.8	0.7	0.0	5
2023	North Melbourne	20	23	71	24	152	64	216	97	17	3	3.1	1.0	6.6	2.8	9.4	4.2	0.7	0.1	7
2024	North Melbourne	20	23	46	14	145	74	219	99	23	34	2.0	0.6	6.3	3.2	9.5	4.3	1.0	1.5	3
2025	North Melbourne	20	17	41	15	108	57	165	78	18	1	2.4	0.9	6.4	3.4	9.7	4.6	1.1	0.1	1
2026	North Melbourne	20	21	39	27	139	74	213	105	22	0	1.9	1.3	6.6	3.5	10.1	5.0	1.0	0.0	0
Career			155	317	125	923	519	1442	626	158	123	2.0	0.8	6.0	3.3	9.3	4.0	1.0	0.8	19
