= Ed Vickers-Willis =

Australian rules footballer

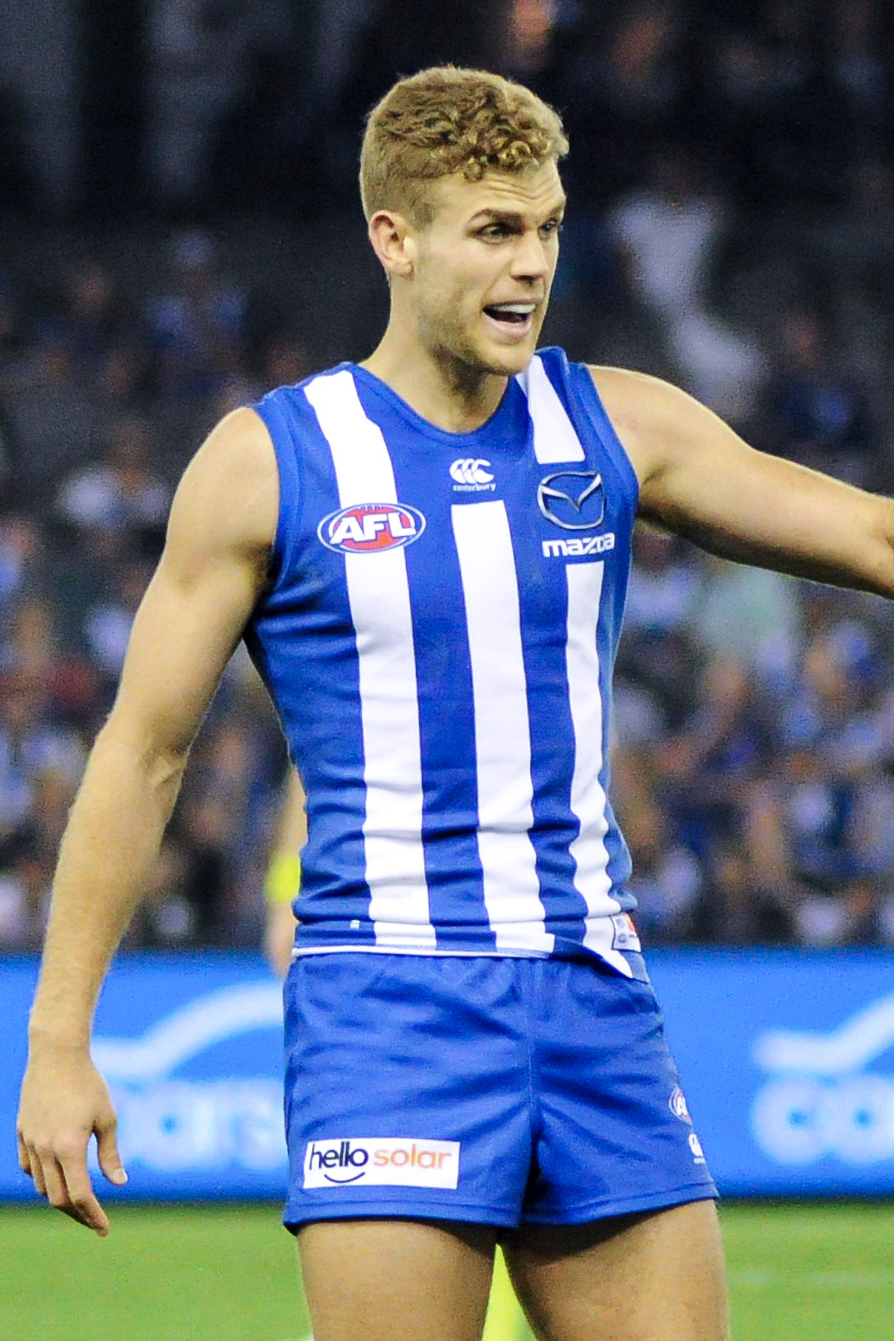
- Vickers-Willis playing for North Melbourne in April 2018

Personal information
- Full name: Ed Vickers-Willis
- Born: 28 March 1996 (age 30)
- Original team: Sandringham Dragons (TAC Cup)
- Draft: No. 36, 2014 national draft
- Debut: Round 5, 2017, North Melbourne vs. Fremantle, at Domain Stadium
- Height: 190 cm (6 ft 3 in)
- Weight: 86 kg (190 lb)
- Position: Defender

Playing career^{1}
Years	Club	Games (Goals)
2015–	North Melbourne	21 (0)
- ^{1} Playing statistics correct to the end of 2020.

Ed Vickers-Willis (born 28 March 1996) is a former professional Australian rules footballer who played for the North Melbourne Football Club in the Australian Football League (AFL). He was drafted by North Melbourne with their third selection and thirty-sixth overall in the 2014 national draft. Vickers-Willis attended Melbourne Grammar School and was also captain of the school in 2014. He made his debut in the five point loss against Fremantle at Domain Stadium in round five of the 2017 season.

After rupturing his posterior cruciate ligament in Round 7, 2018, Vickers-Willis returned to senior football in Round 1 2019 against Fremantle. This was Vickers-Willis’ only match of the 2019 season due to an anterior cruciate ligament injury sustained in the first quarter. He was delisted at the end of the 2020 season.

As of 2021, Vickers-Willis is a consultant at the Boston Consulting Group in Melbourne, Australia.
