= Declan Mountford =

Australian rules footballer

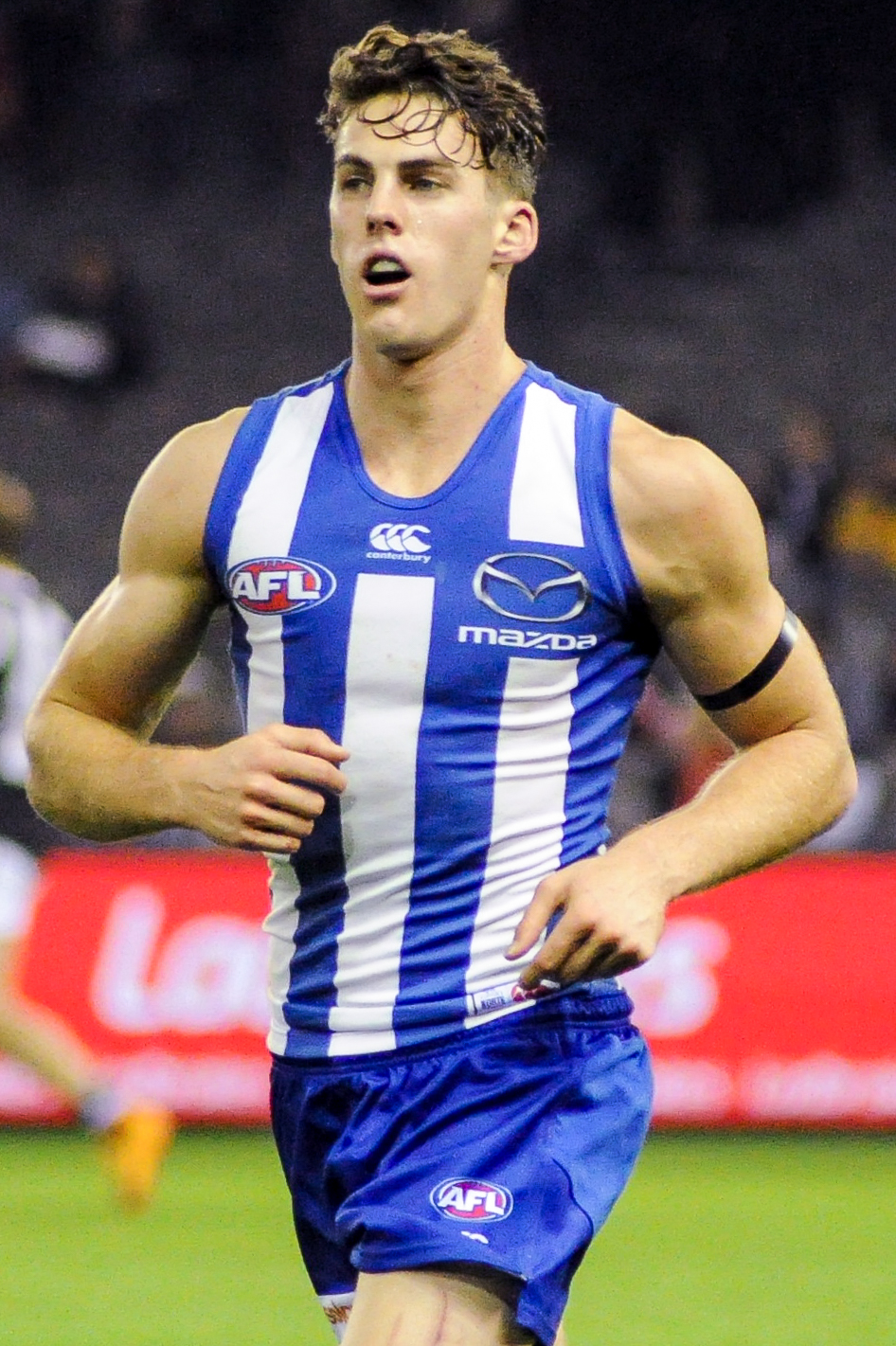
- Mountford playing for North Melbourne in June 2017

Personal information
- Full name: Declan Mountford
- Born: 13 February 1997 (age 29); Manypeaks, Western Australia
- Original team: Claremont (WAFL)
- Draft: No. 60, 2015 national draft
- Debut: Round 1, 2017, North Melbourne vs. West Coast, at Marvel Stadium
- Height: 181 cm (5 ft 11 in)
- Weight: 76 kg (168 lb)
- Position: Midfielder

Playing career^{1}
Years	Club	Games (Goals)
2016–2018	North Melbourne	12 (3)
2022	West Coast	2 (1)
Total		14 (4)
- ^{1} Playing statistics correct to the end of round 8 2022.

Declan Mountford (born 13 February 1997) is a professional Australian rules footballer who played for the North Melbourne Football Club and the West Coast Eagles Football Club in the Australian Football League (AFL) and is currently playing for Claremont Football Club in the West Australian Football League (WAFL). Mountford was born in the small town of Manypeaks in the Great Southern region of Western Australia. After playing colts and senior football at North Albany Football Club as well as five games in the NAB AFL Under-18 Championships, he moved to Perth playing for Claremont Football Club.

He was drafted by the North Melbourne Football Club with their fifth selection and sixtieth overall in the 2015 national draft. Following the draft Mountford played for Werribee Football Club, who are affiliated to North Melbourne, during the 2016 season in the Victorian Football League, as both a midfielder and as a tagger.

He made his AFL debut in the forty-three point loss against West Coast in the opening round of the 2017 season at Etihad Stadium.

He was delisted by North Melbourne at the end of the 2018 season and returned to Western Australia to play for Claremont. In 2021 he was appointed as the co-captain of Claremont and represented Western Australia in the interstate match against South Australia.

Mountford returned to the AFL for the West Coast Eagles in Round 2 of the 2022 season as part of the club's top-up list, after the club was hit by injuries and COVID-19 protocols. Mountford was entered into the squad after midfielder Jackson Nelson suffered a knee injury during a warm-up session, forcing West Coast coach Adam Simpson to call him up against his old side North Melbourne. He got another opportunity in round 8 against Brisbane. Mountford had 8 disposals as a medi-sub.
