= Kayne Turner =

Australian rules footballer

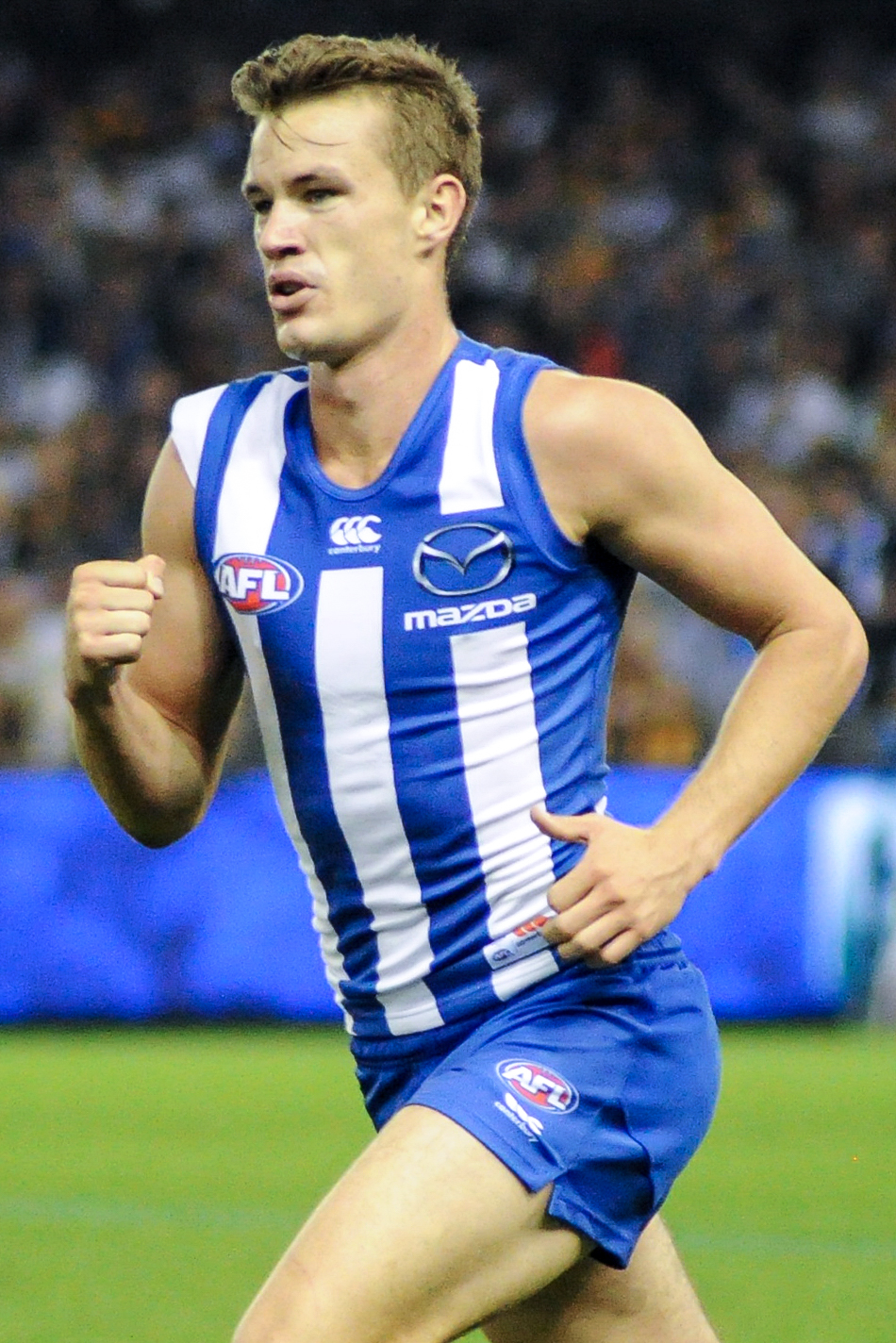
- Turner playing for North Melbourne in April 2018

Personal information
- Full name: Kayne Turner
- Born: 31 December 1995 (age 30)
- Original teams: Kiewa-Sandy Creek, Murray Bushrangers (TAC Cup)
- Draft: No. 25, 2014 rookie draft
- Height: 182 cm (6 ft 0 in)
- Weight: 78 kg (172 lb)
- Position: Midfielder

Playing career^{1}
Years	Club	Games (Goals)
2014–2023	North Melbourne	130 (61)
- ^{1} Playing statistics correct to the end of 2020.

Kayne Turner (born 31 December 1995) is a professional Australian rules footballer who played for the North Melbourne Football Club in the Australian Football League (AFL).

== Early life ==
Turner participated in the Auskick program at Wodonga Showgrounds in Wodonga, Victoria. He completed most of his secondary education at Tallangatta Secondary College in North East Victoria before finishing his Year 12 over two years at Maribyrnong Secondary College sports academy, while juggling his career as a full time athlete.

Turner played junior football for the Murray Bushrangers in the TAC Cup in 2013, as well as thirds and senior football for the Kiewa Sandy Creek football club in the Tallangatta & District Football League.

He was drafted to North Melbourne with pick 25 in the 2014 AFL rookie draft.

== AFL career ==
He was the youngest player on an AFL list during the 2014 AFL season.

Turner was delisted after nine seasons in the AFL in 2022, but was then re-drafted at number 39 in late 2022 in the AFL Rookie Draft, then was finally delisted from the North Melbourne Football Club in October 2023

Turner was signed by the Balwyn Football Club in November 2023 to play in the strong Eastern Football League in 2024.

== Personal life ==
On 22 May 2016, Turner was charged with drink driving after recording a blood alcohol content of 0.133 when pulled over by Victoria Police in Ryall Street, North Melbourne.
