= Kayle Kirby =

Australian rules footballer

Personal information
- Full name: Kayle Kirby
- Born: 26 October 1998 (age 28); Swan Hill
- Original team: Bendigo Pioneers (TAC Cup)
- Draft: No. 50, 2016 national draft
- Height: 182 cm (6 ft 0 in)
- Weight: 89 kg (196 lb)
- Position: Forward

Playing career
Years	Club	Games (Goals)
2017–2018	Collingwood	1 (0)

Kayle Kirby (born 26 October 1998) is a retired professional Australian rules footballer who played for the Collingwood Football Club in the Australian Football League (AFL) and the Collingwood reserves in the Victorian Football League (VFL). Kirby was forced to retire after discovering an "underlying heart condition" following his collapse during a practice match against the North Melbourne reserves.

== Early career ==
Hailing from Swan Hill, he played with the Tyntynder Football Club seniors side at the age of 16. He played for the Bendigo Pioneers in the TAC Cup for the 2015 and 2016 seasons, in which he kicked 32 goals in 2016. In 2016, he played the final two games for Richmond in the Victorian Football League where he kicked nine goals, including five on debut.

== AFL career ==
He was drafted by Collingwood with pick 50 in the 2016 AFL draft and made his debut against Melbourne at the Melbourne Cricket Ground in the final round of the 2017 season. Kirby's 43 goals in the club's reserves matches saw him place third in the league's goalkicking tally for the 2017 VFL season.

On 31 March 2018, Kirby collapsed during a VFL practice match at the Holden Centre. He was taken to hospital and it was discovered that he has an underlying heart condition. At the conclusion of the 2018 season, Kirby retired from professional AFL football.

== Statistics ==
Statistics are correct to the end of 2018 season

Legend
G	Goals	K	Kicks	D	Disposals	T	Tackles
B	Behinds	H	Handballs	M	Marks

Season	Team	No.	Games	Totals							Averages (per game)						
Season	Team	No.	Games	G	B	K	H	D	M	T	G	B	K	H	D	M	T
2017	Collingwood	27	1	0	1	3	1	4	2	5	0.0	1.0	3.0	1.0	4.0	2.0	5.0
2018	Collingwood	27	0	—	—	—	—	—	—	—	—	—	—	—	—	—	—
Career			1	0	1	3	1	4	2	5	0.0	1.0	3.0	1.0	4.0	2.0	5.0
