= Josh Williams (Australian footballer) =

Australian rules footballer

Personal information
- Full name: Josh Williams
- Born: 12 June 1998 (age 28)
- Original team: Hermit Park Tigers (AFLT)
- Draft: No. 36, 2016 national draft
- Debut: Round 18, 2017, North Melbourne vs. Essendon, at Etihad Stadium
- Height: 191 cm (6 ft 3 in)
- Weight: 80 kg (176 lb)
- Position: Midfielder/Forward

Playing career^{1}
Years	Club	Games (Goals)
2017–2018	North Melbourne	2 (1)
- ^{1} Playing statistics correct to the end of 2018.

Josh Williams (born 12 June 1998) is a former professional Australian rules footballer who played for the North Melbourne Football Club in the Australian Football League (AFL).

== Early life ==
Williams was raised in Townsville and played with the Hermit Park Tigers in the Townsville Australian Football League. He was identified as an AFL prospect and signed to the Gold Coast Suns Academy as a teenager.

He was drafted by North Melbourne with their third selection and thirty-sixth overall in the 2016 national draft. He made his debut in the twenty-seven point loss to Essendon at Etihad Stadium in round eighteen of the 2017 season as a late inclusion for Robbie Tarrant. He was delisted at the end of the 2018 season.

For 2019-20 he played for the Southport Sharks in the North East Australian Football League which later merged with the Victorian Football League from 2021 onwards.
