= Mitchell Hibberd =

Australian rules footballer (born 1996)

Personal information
- Full name: Mitchell Hibberd
- Born: 23 September 1996 (age 30)
- Original team: Clarence (TSL)
- Draft: No. 33, 2015 national draft
- Debut: Round 1, 2017, North Melbourne vs. West Coast, at Etihad Stadium
- Height: 190 cm (6 ft 3 in)
- Weight: 86 kg (190 lb)
- Position: Midfielder

Playing career^{1}
Years	Club	Games (Goals)
2016–2018	North Melbourne	4 (0)
2020	Essendon	5 (0)
Total		9 (0)
- ^{1} Playing statistics correct to the end of round 7, 2020.

Mitchell Hibberd (born 23 September 1996) is a professional Australian rules footballer who played for Australian Football League (AFL) clubs North Melbourne and Essendon, and Victorian Football League (VFL) club Williamstown.

== Early life ==
Hibberd is the son of Tasmanian business tycoon and ex Clarence Football Club legend Michael Hibberd. He was born and raised in Tasmania, and moved to Melbourne to play AFL football after being drafted in 2015.

== AFL career ==
Hibberd was drafted by the North Melbourne Football Club with pick 33 in the 2015 national draft. He made his debut against West Coast in the opening round of the 2017 season at Etihad Stadium. He was delisted by North Melbourne at the end of the 2018 AFL season.

Hibberd spent the 2019 season with Victorian Football League club Williamstown, where he was named in the VFL Team of the Year and led the club for votes in the J.J. Liston Trophy count. He was recruited by the Essendon Football Club in the 2019 Rookie draft. He played five games for Essendon in 2020 before being delisted in September 2020. He returned to Williamstown in 2021 wearing the number 2 jersey.

== Television career ==
In 2021, Hibberd appeared as a contestant on the third season of Nine Network's dating reality show Love Island Australia He and partner Tina Provis were crowned the winners during the final, broadcast on the 24th November 2021, taking home the $50,000 prize money between them. In 2022, Hibberd returned for the fourth season of Love Island Australia.
