= Braydon Preuss =

Australian rules footballer

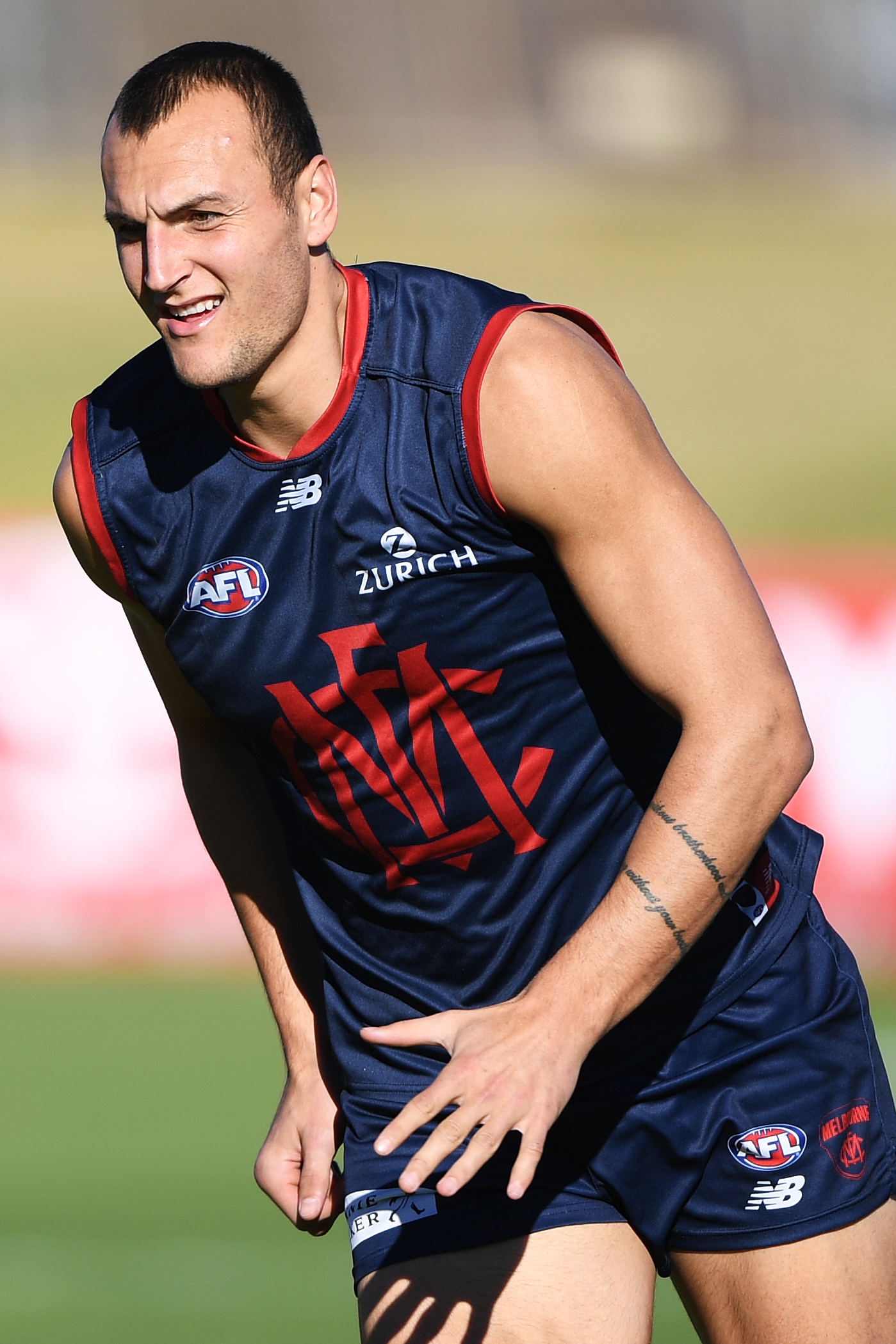
- Preuss in July 2019

Personal information
- Full name: Braydon Preuss
- Born: 16 June 1995 (age 31)
- Original team: Surfers Paradise (QAFL)
- Draft: No. 15, 2015 rookie draft
- Debut: Round 1, 2017, North Melbourne vs. West Coast, at Etihad Stadium
- Height: 206 cm (6 ft 9 in)
- Weight: 114 kg (251 lb)
- Position: Ruckman

Playing career
Years	Club	Games (Goals)
2015–2018	North Melbourne	8 (5)
2019–2020	Melbourne	10 (4)
2021–2024	Greater Western Sydney	10 (2)
Total		28 (11)

Braydon Preuss (born 16 June 1995) is a former professional Australian rules footballer who played for North Melbourne, Melbourne and Greater Western Sydney in the Australian Football League (AFL).

== Early life ==
Preuss was born and raised in Townsville, Queensland. He played rugby league until the age of 16 when friends convinced him to try Australian rules football. He began playing his junior football for Hermit Park in the local AFL Townsville competition before relocating to the Gold Coast and playing for Surfers Paradise in an attempt to increase his chances of being drafted. He was a member of the Gold Coast Suns Academy.

== AFL career ==
He was drafted by North Melbourne with their first selection and fifteenth overall in the 2015 rookie draft. He made his AFL debut in the forty-three point loss against West Coast in the opening round of the 2017 season at the Etihad Stadium.

At the conclusion of the 2018 season, Preuss was traded to Melbourne. However, after only 10 games for Melbourne in two years, Preuss requested a trade to Greater Western Sydney at the conclusion of the 2020 AFL season. He was traded to the Giants on 10 November for Pick 31.

Preuss played 10 games for the Giants over 4 seasons, before being delisted at the end of the 2024 AFL season.

Preuss signed for and made his debut for Williamstown in the 2026 VFL season.

== Statistics ==
Statistics are correct to the end of 2020

Legend
G	Goals	K	Kicks	D	Disposals	T	Tackles
B	Behinds	H	Handballs	M	Marks	H/O	Hit-outs

Season	Team	No.	Games	Totals								Averages (per game)							
Season	Team	No.	Games	G	B	K	H	D	M	T	H/O	G	B	K	H	D	M	T	H/O
2016	North Melbourne	31	0	—	—	—	—	—	—	—	—	—	—	—	—	—	—	—	—
2017	North Melbourne	31	8	5	6	42	29	71	29	23	180	0.6	0.8	5.3	3.6	8.9	3.6	2.9	22.5
2018	North Melbourne	31	0	—	—	—	—	—	—	—	—	—	—	—	—	—	—	—	—
2019	Melbourne	21	7	4	2	49	17	66	15	7	133	0.6	0.3	7.0	2.4	9.4	2.1	1.0	19.0
2020	Melbourne	21	3	—	—	16	6	22	7	—	—	—	—	—	—	—	—	—	—
Career			18	9	8	107	52	159	51	30	313	0.6	0.5	6.1	3.1	9.1	2.9	2.0	20.9
