= Ben Brown (footballer) =

Australian rules footballer (born 1992)

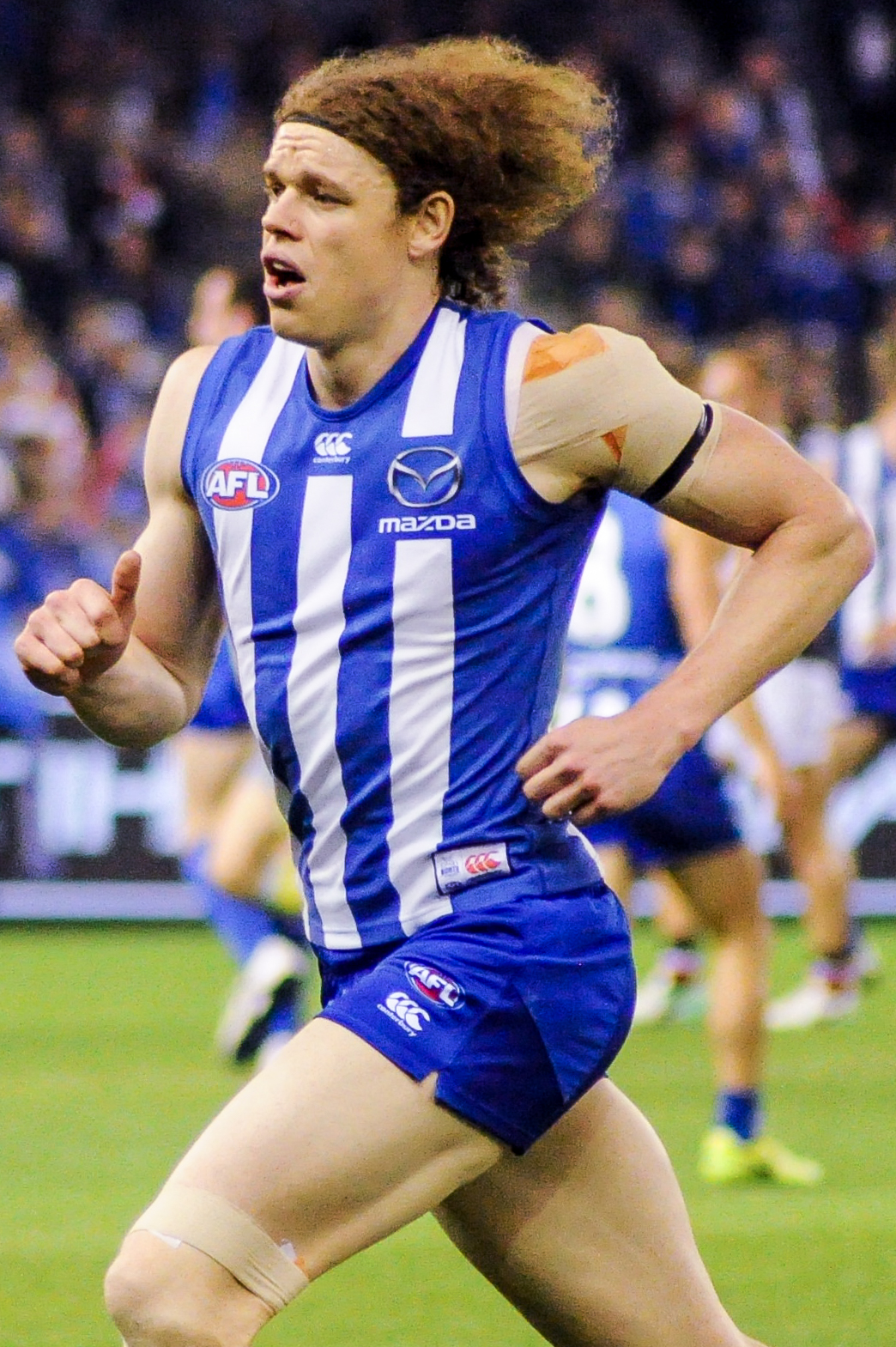
- Brown playing for North Melbourne in June 2017

Personal information
- Full name: Ben Brown
- Born: 20 November 1992 (age 33); Hobart, Tasmania
- Original team: Werribee (VFL)/Glenorchy (TSL)/Devonport
- Draft: No. 47, 2013 national draft
- Height: 200 cm (6 ft 7 in)
- Weight: 101 kg (223 lb)
- Position: Key forward / ruckman

Club information
- Current club: Melbourne
- Number: 50

Playing career
Years	Club	Games (Goals)
2014–2020	North Melbourne	130 (287)
2021–2024	Melbourne	45 (73)
Total		175 (360)

International team honours
Years	Team	Games (Goals)
2017	Australia	2 (2)

Career highlights
- AFL premiership player: 2021; 4x North Melbourne leading goalkicker: 2016–2019

Benjamin Brown (born 20 November 1992) is a former Australian rules footballer who played for the North Melbourne Football Club and Melbourne Football Club in the Australian Football League.

Brown was well known for his long run up and accurate set shots.

== AFL career ==
=== North Melbourne (2014–2020) ===
Brown played his junior football for Devonport Football Club, then played for Glenorchy Football Club in the Tasmanian State League before being selected 47th overall by North Melbourne in the 2013 national draft. After a development stint at then-Kangaroos affiliate Werribee in the VFL, Brown made his AFL debut in round 14, 2014 against Melbourne, kicking a goal and impressing coach Brad Scott enough to keep his spot the following week.

Brown went on to be an influential player in the North Melbourne team in the latter stages of the season, with strong performances in the finals series. He finished the 2014 season with 18 goals, improving in 2015 with 32 and once again in 2016 when he kicked 41 for the season and captured North Melbourne's leading goal kicker award for the first time.

In 2017, Brown kicked a career best 63 goals, allowing him to win North Melbourne's leading goal kicker award for the second straight year. Brown also finished third in the 2017 Coleman Medal behind Josh Kennedy (65) and Lance Franklin (69), with his form also paving the way to a spot in the preliminary 40-man All Australian squad. In 2018, Brown kicked 61 goals from 22 games, finishing second in the Coleman Medal behind Richmond’s Jack Riewoldt and once again being selected in the 40-man All-Australian team.

In round 22 of the 2019 season, Brown kicked a career high 10 goals in a 144–58 win over Port Adelaide. Brown became the first North Melbourne player to kick double-digit goals in a game since Wayne Carey did so back in 1999. He finished the 2019 season having kicked a career best 64 goals from 22 games, finishing second in the Coleman medal for a second year running behind Greater Western Sydney's Jeremy Cameron (67) and won the North Melbourne goal kicking award for the fourth year in a row. He again gained selection in the initial 40-man All-Australian team for the third year in a row but was again passed over for the final 22.

During the 2017, 2018 and 2019 home and away seasons Brown finished 3rd, 2nd and 2nd respectively in the Coleman Medal and kicked a combined total of 188 goals across 66 games, the most of any player in the AFL over that time period.

After a 2020 season hampered by injury in which he only played 9 games and kicked 8 goals, Brown was put up for trade by North Melbourne. He eventually requested a trade to Melbourne, and was traded on the final day of the 2020 trade period.

=== Melbourne (2021–2024) ===
After an injury-hampered start to the 2021 season, Brown became a mainstay of the Demons’ forward line in the second half of the year and throughout the Demons’ finals campaign. Brown scored three goals in Melbourne's 2021 AFL Grand Final win.

After a slew of injuries as well as undergoing knee surgery, Brown announced his retirement from football on 19 August 2024.

== Personal life ==
Brown is the grandson of footballer and politician Jim Manson and nephew of former Collingwood player James Manson. He was born in Hobart but grew up in Devonport.

Brown attended secondary school at St Brendan Shaw College in Devonport. He has since completed a Bachelor of Arts from Deakin University in Victoria.

Brown married Hester Mary MacKinnon on 14 October 2017, and they have two daughters.

Brown is a vegan, coeliac and an advocate for greater action on climate change.

== Statistics ==
Legend
G	Goals	K	Kicks	D	Disposals	T	Tackles
B	Behinds	H	Handballs	M	Marks

Season	Team	No.	Games	Totals							Averages (per game)							Votes
Season	Team	No.	Games	G	B	K	H	D	M	T	G	B	K	H	D	M	T	Votes
2014	North Melbourne	50	11	18	9	66	41	107	49	17	1.6	0.8	6.0	3.7	9.7	4.5	1.5	1
2015	North Melbourne	50	22	32	17	152	72	224	99	21	1.5	0.8	6.9	3.3	10.2	4.5	1.0	2
2016	North Melbourne	50	22	41	18	174	65	239	115	28	1.9	0.8	7.9	3.0	10.9	5.2	1.3	0
2017	North Melbourne	50	22	63	30	180	76	256	120	27	2.9	1.4	8.2	3.5	11.6	5.5	1.2	14
2018	North Melbourne	50	22	61	24	186	60	246	100	24	2.8	1.1	8.5	2.7	11.2	4.5	1.1	6
2019	North Melbourne	50	22	64	34	187	57	244	108	25	2.9	1.5	8.5	2.6	11.1	4.9	1.1	8
2020 (Note: The 2020 season was played with 17 home-and-away matches per team (down from 22) and 16-minute quarters with time on (down from 20-minute quarters with time on) due to the impact of the COVID-19 pandemic.)	North Melbourne	50	9	8	8	49	12	61	31	6	0.9	0.9	5.4	1.3	6.8	3.4	0.7	0
2021^{#}	Melbourne	50	13	25	13	102	24	126	69	20	1.9	1.0	7.8	1.8	9.7	5.3	1.5	0
2022	Melbourne	50	19	30	19	114	59	173	79	17	1.6	1.0	6.0	3.1	9.1	4.2	0.9	0
2023 (Note: 2023 statistics include one game in which Brown was substituted out of the game (round 3) and was replaced by Jake Melksham.)	Melbourne	50	7	11	4	44	22	66	26	6	1.6	0.6	6.3	3.1	9.4	3.7	0.9	1
2024	Melbourne	50	6	7	4	26	11	37	18	2	1.2	0.7	4.3	1.8	6.2	3.0	0.3	0
Career			175	360	180	1280	499	1779	814	193	2.1	1.0	7.3	2.9	10.2	4.7	1.1	32

== Honours and achievements ==
Team

- AFL premiership player (Melbourne): 2021
- McClelland Trophy (Melbourne): 2021

Individual

- 4× North Melbourne Leading Goalkicker: 2016, 2017, 2018, 2019
- Australia international rules football team: 2017
- Ian Ridley Memorial Trophy: 2021
