= Daniel Nielson =

Australian rules footballer

Personal information
- Full name: Daniel Nielson
- Born: 9 May 1996 (age 30)
- Original team: Eastern Ranges (TAC Cup)
- Draft: No. 25, 2014 national draft
- Debut: Round 16, 2017, North Melbourne vs. Fremantle, at Etihad Stadium
- Height: 194 cm (6 ft 4 in)
- Weight: 96 kg (212 lb)
- Position: Defender

Playing career^{1}
Years	Club	Games (Goals)
2015–2018	North Melbourne	7 (0)
- ^{1} Playing statistics correct to the end of 2018.

Daniel Nielson (born 9 May 1996) is a former professional Australian rules footballer who played for the North Melbourne Football Club in the Australian Football League (AFL). He was drafted by North Melbourne with their second selection and twenty-fifth overall in the 2014 national draft. He made his debut in the four point loss to Fremantle at Etihad Stadium in round sixteen of the 2017 season. Nielson is of German ancestry. He was delisted at the end of the 2018 season. Neilson played for VFL team Werribee in 2019.
