= Marley Williams =

Australian rules footballer

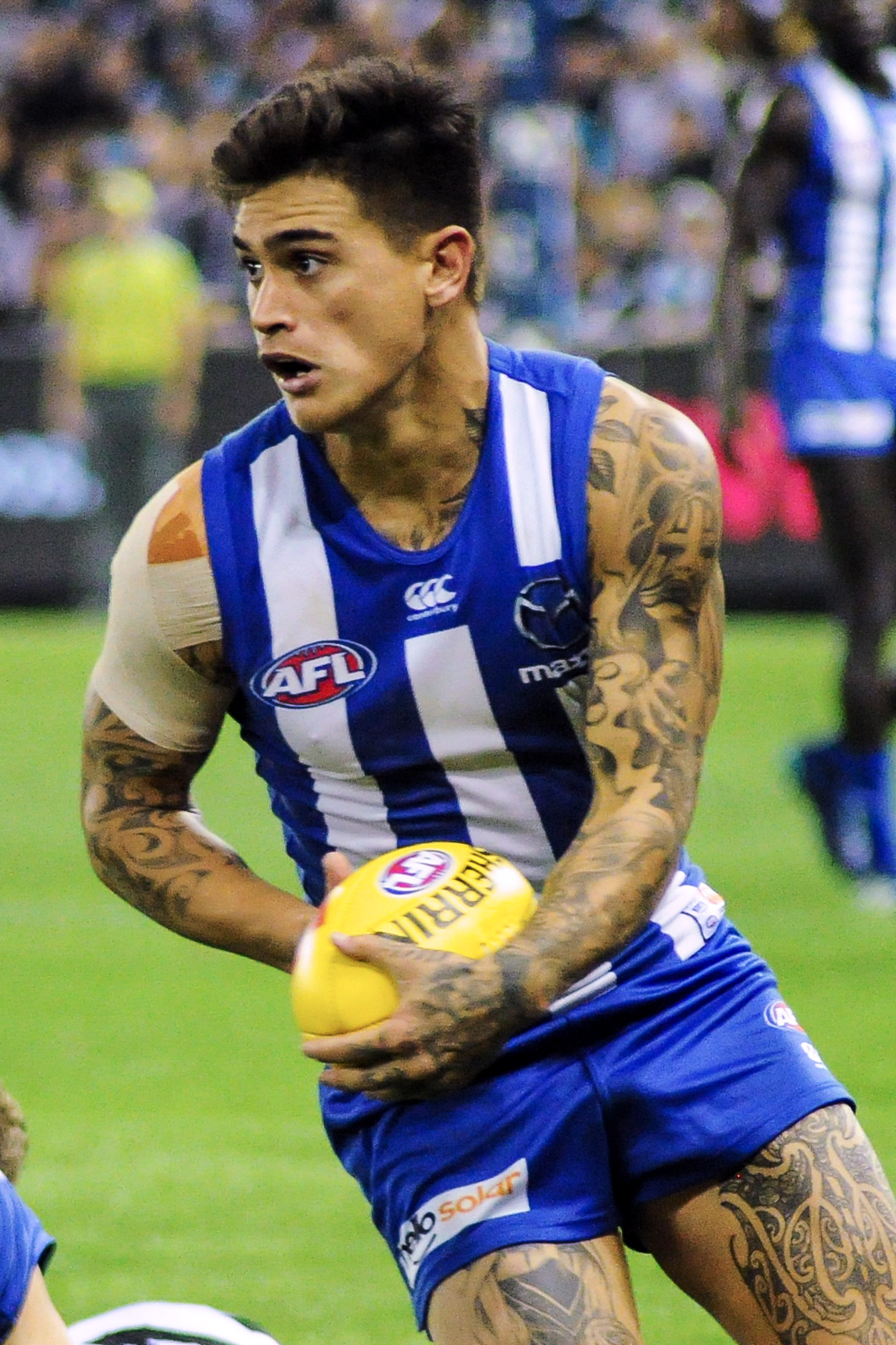
- Williams playing for North Melbourne in April 2018

Personal information
- Full name: Marley Williams
- Born: 22 July 1993 (age 33); Albany, Western Australia
- Original team: Claremont (WAFL)
- Draft: No. 35, 2012 rookie draft
- Height: 181 cm (5 ft 11 in)
- Weight: 83 kg (183 lb)
- Position: Defender

Club information
- Current club: North Melbourne
- Number: 2

Playing career^{1}
Years	Club	Games (Goals)
2012–2016	Collingwood	68 (6)
2017–2020	North Melbourne	57 (5)
Total		125 (11)
- ^{1} Playing statistics correct to the end of 2018.

Career highlights
- 2013 AFL Rising Star nominee

Marley Williams (born 22 July 1993) is a former professional Australian rules footballer who played for the North Melbourne Football Club and the Collingwood Football Club in the Australian Football League (AFL). He previously played for the Collingwood Football Club he was recruited by Collingwood in the 2012 Rookie Draft, with pick #35. Williams made his debut in Round 9, 2012, against Adelaide at Football Park.

Following the retirement of Ben Johnson in 2013, at the beginning of 2014 Johnson presented Williams with his number 26 guernsey, reenacting Gavin Brown's presentation of the guernsey to Johnson in 2001. At the conclusion of the 2016 season, he was traded to North Melbourne. On 5 July Williams extended his contract with North Melbourne until the end of the 2020 season.

Williams was delisted by North Melbourne at the end of the 2020 AFL season after a mass delisting by North Melbourne which saw 11 players cut from the team's list.

== Personal life ==
In February 2014, Williams was convicted of grievous bodily harm for breaking a man's jaw outside a nightclub in Albany, Western Australia. He was sentenced in April 2014 and was given a suspended sentence.

== Statistics ==
Statistics are correct to the end of the 2016 season

Legend
G	Goals	K	Kicks	D	Disposals	T	Tackles
B	Behinds	H	Handballs	M	Marks

Season	Team	No.	Games	Totals							Averages (per game)						
Season	Team	No.	Games	G	B	K	H	D	M	T	G	B	K	H	D	M	T
2012	Collingwood	46	6	1	0	52	21	73	16	18	0.2	0.0	8.7	3.5	12.2	2.7	3.0
2013	Collingwood	46	16	2	4	181	89	270	68	52	0.1	0.3	11.3	5.6	16.9	4.3	3.3
2014	Collingwood	26	15	1	3	174	88	262	58	33	0.1	0.2	11.6	5.9	17.5	3.9	2.2
2015	Collingwood	26	20	2	2	246	180	426	75	53	0.1	0.1	12.3	9.0	21.3	3.8	2.7
2016	Collingwood	26	11	0	0	88	83	171	34	22	0.0	0.0	8.0	7.5	15.5	3.1	2.0
Career			68	6	9	741	461	1202	251	178	0.1	0.1	10.9	6.8	17.7	3.7	2.6
